= Eisner Award for Best Coloring =

American comic book award

- Awarded for: Best Coloring for Comic Books
- Country: United States
- First award: 1992
- Most recent winner: Jordie Bellaire
- Website: www.comic-con.org/awards/eisner-awards-current-info

The Eisner Award for Best Coloring is an award for "creative achievement" in American comic books. It is awarded to a colorist. The award was named "Best Colorist" from 1992 until 1994.

== Winners and nominees ==
Year	Nominee	Titles	Ref.
1990s
1992	Steve Oliff	Batman: Legends of the Dark Knight (DC Comics), 2112 (Dark Horse Comics), Akira (Epic Comics)	
1992	Lovern Kindzierski	L.E.G.I.O.N. '91 (DC Comics), L.E.G.I.O.N. '92 (DC Comics)	
1992	Tom Luth	Groo the Wanderer (Epic Comics), Usagi Yojimbo Color Special #2 (Fantagraphics Books)	
1992	Cris Palomino	Uncle Scrooge (Disney), Disney Digests (Disney), The Jetsons (Harvey Comics)	
1992	Daniel Vozzo	The Sandman (DC Comics), Doom Patrol (DC Comics)	
1993	Steve Oliff/Olyoptics	Batman: Legends of the Dark Knight #28-#30 (DC Comics), Martian Manhunter: American Secrets (DC Comics), James Bond 007: Serpent's Tooth (Dark Horse Comics), Spawn (Image Comics)	
1993	Lovern Kindzierski/Digital Chameleon	Fairy Tales of Oscar Wilde (NBM Publishing), Batman: Sword of Azrael (DC Comics), L.E.G.I.O.N. '92 (DC Comics)	
1993	Richmond Lewis	Ironwolf: Fires of the Revolution (DC Comics)	
1993	Bernie Mireault	Grendel: War Child (Dark Horse Comics), The Jam: Urban Adventure (Tundra Publishing)	
1994	Steve Oliff and Reuben Rude (Olyoptics)	Spawn (Image Comics)	
1994	Joe Chiodo	WildC.A.T.S. (Image Comics), Deathblow (Image Comics)	
1994	Matt Hollingsworth	Aliens: Labyrinth (Dark Horse Comics), Aliens: Salvation (Dark Horse Comics), Creature from the Black Lagoon (Dark Horse Comics)	
1994	Joe Matt	Batman/Grendel (Comico/DC Comics)	
1994	Daniel Vozzo	The Sandman (DC Comics/Vertigo Comics), Shade, the Changing Man (DC Comics/Vertigo Comics)	
1994	Tom Ziuko	Hellblazer (DC Comics/Vertigo Comics)	
1995	Angus McKie	Martha Washington goes to War (Dark Horse Comics)	
1995	Peter Bagge/Mary Woodring	Hate (Fantagraphics Books)	
1995	Elizabeth Chadwick	Concrete: Killer Smile (Dark Horse Comics/Legend Comics)	
1995	Susan Daigle-Leach	Uncle Scrooge (Gladstone Publishing)	
1995	Chris Ware	Acme Novelty Library (Fantagraphics Books)	
1996	Chris Ware	Acme Novelty Library (Fantagraphics Books)	
1996	George Freeman	The X-Files (Topps Comics)	
1996	Claude Legris	The Big Guy and Rusty the Boy Robot (Dark Horse Comics/Legend Comics)	
1996	Angus McKie	Neil Gaiman's Teknophage (Tekno Comix), Martha Washington: Stranded in Space (Dark Horse Comics/Legend Comics)	
1996	Maurice Vellekoop	Stories in Drawn & Quarterly (Drawn & Quarterly)	
1997	Matt Hollingsworth	Preacher (DC Comics/Vertigo Comics), Death: The Time of Your Life (DC Comics/Vertigo Comics), Bloody Mary (DC Comics/Helix), Challengers of the Unknown (DC Comics)	
1997	Monica Bennett	Deathblow/Wolverine (WildStorm/Image Comics/Marvel Comics)	
1997	Jeromy Cox	Leave It to Chance (Homage Comics)	
1997	Patricia Mulvihill	Wonder Woman, (DC Comics), Firebrand (DC Comics), Batman and Captain America (DC Comics/Marvel Comics)	
1997	Daniel Vozzo	The Invisibles (DC Comics/Vertigo Comics), The Dreaming (DC Comics/Vertigo Comics), The Sandman (DC Comics/Vertigo Comics)	
1998	Chris Ware	Acme Novelty Library (Fantagraphics Books)	
1998	Laura Allred	Red Rocket 7 (Dark Horse Comics)	
1998	Jeromy Cox	Leave It to Chance (Homage Comics), Mage (Image Comics)	
1998	Sarah Dyer	Amy Racecar Color Special #1 (El Capitan Books)	
1998	Lovern Kindzierski	Elric: Stormbringer (Dark Horse Comics/Topps Comics), Dr. Strange: What Is It That Disturbs You, Stephen? (Marvel Comics)	
1998	Archer Prewitt	Sof' Boy and Friends (Drawn & Quarterly)	
1999	Lynn Varley	300 (Dark Horse Comics)	
1999	Bjarne Hansen	Superman for All Seasons (DC Comics)	
1999	Dave Kemp	Inhumans (Marvel Comics)	
1999	Liquid! (Christian Lichtner and Aron Lusen)	Battle Chasers (Cliffhanger/WildStorm/Image Comics)	
1999	Jonathan D. Smith	Fathom (Top Cow Productions/Image Comics)	
2000s
2000	Laura DuPuy	The Authority (DC Comics/WildStorm), Planetary (DC Comics/WildStorm)	
2000	Laura Allred	Madman Comics (Dark Horse Comics/Maverick), Happydale: Devils in the Desert (DC Comics/Vertigo Comics)	
2000	Angus McKie	Heart of Empire (Dark Horse Comics)	
2000	Kevin Nowlan	"Jack B. Quick" in Tomorrow Stories (America's Best Comics)	
2000	Chris Ware	Acme Novelty Library (Fantagraphics Books)	
2001	Chris Ware	Acme Novelty Library #14 (Fantagraphics Books)	
2001	Jeromy Cox	Promethea (America's Best Comics)	
2001	Lovern Kindzierski	Ring of the Nibelung (Dark Horse Comics/Maverick)	
2001	Patricia Mulvihill	100 Bullets (Vertigo Comics/DC Comics), Nightwing (DC Comics)	
2001	Lynn Varley	Sin City: Hell and Back (Dark Horse Comics/Maverick)	
2002	Laura DuPuy	Ruse (CrossGen), Ministry of Space (Image Comics)	
2002	Edgar Delgado/Studio F	Out There (DC Comics/WildStorm)	
2002	Patricia Mulvihill	Wonder Woman (DC Comics), 100 Bullets (Vertigo Comics/DC Comics)	
2002	José Villarrubia	Fantastic Four: 1234 (Marvel Comics)	
2002	Chris Ware	Acme Novelty Library #15 (Fantagraphics Books)	
2003	Dave Stewart	Hellboy: The Third Wish (Dark Horse Comics), The Amazing Screw-On Head (Dark Horse Comics), Star Wars: Empire (Dark Horse Comics), Human Target: Final Cut (DC Comics/Vertigo Comics), Doom Patrol (DC Comics/Vertigo Comics), Tom Strong (America's Best Comics, Captain America (Marvel Comics)	
2003	Jeromy Cox	Promethea (America's Best Comics), Leave It to Chance (Image Comics)	
2003	Matt Hollingsworth	Alias (Marvel Comics), Daredevil (Marvel Comics), The Filth #1-3 (DC Comics/Vertigo Comics), Batman: Nine Lives (DC Comics), Catwoman (DC Comics), Catwoman: Selina's Big Score (DC Comics)	
2003	Paul Hornschemeier	Forlorn Funnies (Absence of Ink)	
2003	Laura DuPuy Martin	Ruse (comics) (CrossGen)	
2003	Patricia Mulvihill	Gotham Girls (DC Comics), Wonder Woman (DC Comics), 100 Bullets (DC Comics/Vertigo Comics), Hellblazer Special: Lady Constantine (DC Comics/Vertigo Comics)	
2004	Patricia Mulvihill	Batman (DC Comics), Wonder Woman (DC Comics), 100 Bullets (Vertigo Comics/DC Comics)	
2004	Steven Griffin	Hawaiian Dick (Image Comics)	
2004	Matt Hollingsworth	Catwoman (DC Comics)	
2004	Paul Hornschemeier	Forlorn Funnies (Absence of Ink)	
2004	Jason Keith	El Cazador (CrossGen)	
2005	Dave Stewart	Daredevil (Marvel Comics), Ultimate X-Men (Marvel Comics), Ultimate Six (Marvel Comics), Captain America (Marvel Comics), Conan (Dark Horse Comics), BPRD (Dark Horse Comics), DC: The New Frontier (DC Comics)	
2005	Peter Doherty	Shaolin Cowboy (Burlyman Entertainment)	
2005	Steven Griffen	Hawaiian Dick: Last Resort (Image Comics)	
2005	Laura DePuy Martin	Astonishing X-Men (Marvel Comics), Ministry of Space (Image Comics), Planetary (WildStorm/DC Comics), I Am Legion: The Dancing Faun (Humanoids Publishing/DC Comics)	
2005	J.D. Mettler	Ex Machina (WildStorm/DC Comics)	
2006	Chris Ware	Acme Novelty Library #16 (Acme Novelty Library)	
2006	Jeromy Cox	Teen Titans (DC Comics), Otherworld (Vertigo Comics/DC Comics)	
2006	Steven Griffen	Hawaiian Dick: Last Resort (Image Comics)	
2006	Steve Hamaker	Bone: The Great Cow Race (Scholastic Graphix)	
2006	José Villarrubia	Desolation Jones (WildStorm/DC Comics)	
2007	Dave Stewart	BPRD (Dark Horse Comics), Conan (Dark Horse Comics), The Escapists (Dark Horse Comics), Hellboy (Dark Horse Comics), Action Comics (DC Comics), Batman/The Spirit (DC Comics), Superman (DC Comics)	
2007	Kristian Donaldson	Supermarket (IDW Publishing)	
2007	Hubert	The Left Bank Gang (Fantagraphics Books)	
2007	Lark Pien	American Born Chinese (First Second)	
2007	Chris Ware	Acme Novelty Library #17 (Acme Novelty Library)	
2008	Dave Stewart	BPRD (Dark Horse Comics), Buffy the Vampire Slayer (Dark Horse Comics), Cut (Dark Horse Comics), Hellboy (Dark Horse Comics), Lobster Johnson (Dark Horse Comics), The Umbrella Academy (Dark Horse Comics), The Spirit (DC Comics)	
2008	Jimmy Gownley	Amelia Rules! (Renaissance Press)	
2008	Steve Hamaker	Bone: Rock Jaw: Master of the Eastern Border (Scholastic Graphix), Bone: Old Man's Cave (Scholastic Graphix), Shazam! The Monster Society of Evil (DC Comics)	
2008	Richard Isanove	The Dark Tower: The Gunslinger Born (Marvel Comics)	
2008	Ronda Pattison	Atomic Robo (Red 5 Comics)	
2008	Alex Wald	Shaolin Cowboy (Burlyman Entertainment)	
2009	Dave Stewart	Abe Sapien: The Drowning (Dark Horse Comics), BPRD (Dark Horse Comics), The Goon (Dark Horse Comics), Hellboy (Dark Horse Comics), Solomon Kane (Dark Horse Comics), The Umbrella Academy (Dark Horse Comics), Body Bags (Image Comics), Captain America: White (Marvel Comics)	
2009	Steve Hamaker	Bone: Ghost Circles (Scholastic Graphix), Bone: Treasure Hunters (Scholastic Graphix)	
2009	Patricia Mulvihill	Joker (DC Comics), 100 Bullets (Vertigo Comics/DC Comics)	
2009	Val Staples	Criminal (Icon Comics), Incognito (Icon Comics)	
2009	Chris Ware	Acme Novelty Library #19 (Acme Novelty Library)	
2010s
2010	Dave Stewart	Abe Sapien (Dark Horse Comics), BPRD (Dark Horse Comics), The Goon (Dark Horse Comics), Hellboy (Dark Horse Comics), Solomon Kane (Dark Horse Comics), The Umbrella Academy (Dark Horse Comics), Zero Killer (Dark Horse Comics), Detective Comics (DC Comics), Northlanders (Vertigo Comics), Luna Park (Vertigo Comics)	
2010	Steve Hamaker	Bone: Crown of Horns (Scholastic Graphix), Little Mouse Gets Ready (Toon Books)	
2010	Laura Martin	The Rocketeer: The Complete Adventures (IDW Publishing), Thor (Marvel Comics), The Stand: American Nightmares (Marvel Comics)	
2010	David Mazzucchelli	Asterios Polyp (Pantheon Books)	
2010	Alex Sinclair	Blackest Night (DC Comics), Batman and Robin (DC Comics)	
2011	Dave Stewart	Hellboy (Dark Horse Comics), BPRD (Dark Horse Comics), Baltimore (Dark Horse Comics), Let Me In (Dark Horse Comics), Detective Comics (DC Comics), Neil Young’s Greendale (Vertigo Comics/DC Comics), Daytripper (Vertigo Comics/DC Comics), Joe the Barbarian (Vertigo Comics/DC Comics)	
2011	Jimmy Gownley	Amelia Rules!:True Things (Adults Don’t Want Kids to Know) (Atheneum/Simon & Schuster), Amelia Rules!: The Tweenage Guide to Not Being Unpopular (Atheneum/Simon & Schuster)	
2011	Metaphrog (Sandra Marrs and John Chalmers)	Louis: Night Salad (Metaphrog)	
2011	Hilary Sycamore	City of Spies (First Second Books), Resistance (First Second Books), Booth (First Second Books), Brain Camp (First Second Books), Solomon’s Thieves (First Second Books)	
2011	Chris Ware	Acme Novelty Library #20: Lint (Acme Novelty Library)	
2012	Laura Allred	iZOMBIE (Vertigo Comics/DC Comics), Madman All-New Giant-Size Super-Ginchy Special (Image Comics)	
2012	Bill Crabtree	The Sixth Gun (Oni Press)	
2012	Ian Herring and Ramón K. Pérez	Jim Henson's Tale of Sand (Archaia Entertainment)	
2012	Viktor Kalvachev	Blue Estate (Image Comics)	
2012	Cris Peter	Casanova: Avaritia (Icon Comics), Casanova: Gula (Icon Comics)	
2013	Dave Stewart	Batwoman (DC Comics), Fatale (Image Comics), BPRD (Dark Horse Comics), Conan the Barbarian (Dark Horse Comics), Hellboy in Hell (Dark Horse Comics), Lobster Johnson (Dark Horse Comics), The Massive (Dark Horse Comics)	
2013	Charles Burns	The Hive (Pantheon Books)	
2013	Colleen Coover	Bandette (MonkeyBrain Books)	
2013	Brandon Graham	Multiple Warheads (Image Comics)	
2013	Chris Ware	Building Stories (Pantheon Books)	
2014	Jordie Bellaire	The Manhattan Projects (Image Comics), Nowhere Men (Image Comics), Pretty Deadly (Image Comics), Zero (Image Comics), The Massive (Dark Horse Comics), Tom Strong (DC Comics), The X-Files Season 10 (IDW Publishing), Captain Marvel (Marvel Comics), Journey into Mystery (Marvel Comics), Numbercruncher (Titan Comics), Quantum and Woody (Valiant Comics)	
2014	Steve Hamaker	Mylo Xyloto (Bongo Comics), Strangers in Paradise 20th Anniversary Issue 1 (Abstract Studio), RASL (Cartoon Books)	
2014	Matt Hollingsworth	Hawkeye (Marvel Comics), Daredevil: End of Days (Marvel Comics), The Wake (DC Comics/Vertigo Comics)	
2014	Frank Martin	East of West (Image Comics)	
2014	Dave Stewart	Abe Sapien (Dark Horse Comics), Baltimore: The Infernal Train, BPRD: Hell on Earth (Dark Horse Comics), Conan the Barbarian (Dark Horse Comics), Hellboy in Hell (Dark Horse Comics), The Massive (Dark Horse Comics), The Shaolin Cowboy (Dark Horse Comics), Sledgehammer 44 (Dark Horse Comics)	
2015	Dave Stewart	Hellboy in Hell (Dark Horse Comics), BPRD (Dark Horse Comics), Abe Sapien (Dark Horse Comics), Baltimore (Dark Horse Comics), Lobster Johnson (Dark Horse Comics), Sir Edward Grey: Witchfinder (Dark Horse Comics), The Shaolin Cowboy (Dark Horse Comics), Aliens: Fire and Stone (Dark Horse Comics), DHP (Dark Horse Comics)	
2015	Laura Allred	Silver Surfer (Marvel Comics), Madman in Your Face 3D Special (Image Comics)	
2015	Nelson Daniel	Little Nemo: Return to Slumberland (IDW Publishing), Judge Dredd (IDW Publishing), Wild Blue Yonder (IDW Publishing)	
2015	Lovern Kindzierski	The Graveyard Book vols. 1-2 (Harper)	
2015	Matthew Petz	The Leg (Top Shelf Productions)	
2015	Matt Wilson	Adventures of Superman (DC Comics), The Wicked + The Divine (Image Comics), Daredevil (Marvel Comics), Thor (Marvel Comics)	
2016	Jordie Bellaire	The Autumnlands (Image Comics), Injection (Image Comics), Plutona (Image Comics), Pretty Deadly (Image Comics), The Surface (Image Comics), They’re Not Like Us (Image Comics), Zero (Image Comics), The X-Files (IDW Publishing), The Massive (Dark Horse Comics), Magneto (Marvel Comics), Vision (Marvel Comics)	
2016	Laura Allred	Lady Killer (Dark Horse Comics), Silver Surfer (Marvel Comics), Art Ops (Vertigo Comics/DC Comics)	
2016	Elizabeth Breitweiser	The Fade Out (Image Comics), Criminal Magazine (Image Comics), Outcast by Kirkman and Azaceta (Image Comics), Velvet (Image Comics)	
2016	John Rauch	The Beauty (Image Comics), Batman: Arkham Knight (DC Comics), Earth 2: Society (DC Comics), Runaways (Marvel Comics)	
2016	Dave Stewart	Abe Sapien (Dark Horse Comics), BPRD Hell on Earth (Dark Horse Comics), Fight Club 2 (Dark Horse Comics), Frankenstein Underground (Dark Horse Comics), Hellboy in Hell (Dark Horse Comics), Hellboy and the BPRD (Dark Horse Comics), The Sandman: Overture (Vertigo Comics/DC Comics), The Twilight Children (Vertigo Comics/DC Comics), Captain America: White (Marvel Comics), Space Dumplins (Scholastic Graphix)	
2017	Matt Wilson	Cry Havoc (Image Comics), Paper Girls (Image Comics), The Wicked + The Divine (Image Comics), Black Widow (Marvel Comics), The Mighty Thor (Marvel Comics), Star-Lord (Marvel Comics)	
2017	Jean-Francois Beaulieu	Green Valley (Image Comics/Skybound Entertainment)	
2017	Elizabeth Breitweiser	Criminal 10th Anniversary Special (Image Comics), Kill or Be Killed (Image Comics), Velvet (Image Comics), Outcast (Image Comics/Skybound Entertainment)	
2017	Sonny Liew	The Art of Charlie Chan Hock Chye (Pantheon Books)	
2017	Laura Martin	Wonder Woman (DC Comics), Ragnarök (IDW Publishing), Black Panther (Marvel Comics)	
2018	Emil Ferris	My Favorite Thing Is Monsters (Fantagraphics Books)	
2018	Mitch Gerads	Mister Miracle (DC Comics)	
2018	Ed Piskor	X-Men: Grand Design (Marvel Comics)	
2018	David Rubín	Ether (Dark Horse Comics), Black Hammer (Dark Horse Comics), Sherlock Frankenstein (Dark Horse Comics), Beowulf (Image Comics)	
2018	Dave Stewart	Black Hammer (Dark Horse Comics), BPRD: Devil You Know (Dark Horse Comics), Hellboy: Into the Silent Sea (Dark Horse Comics), Sherlock Frankenstein (Dark Horse Comics), Shaolin Cowboy (Dark Horse Comics), Maestros (Image Comics)	
2018	Rosemary Valero-O'Connell	What is Left (ShortBox)	
2019	Matt Wilson	Black Cloud (Image Comics), Paper Girls (Image Comics), The Wicked + The Divine (Image Comics), The Mighty Thor (Marvel Comics), Runaways (Marvel Comics)	
2019	Jordie Bellaire	Batgirl (DC Comics), Batman (DC Comics), Nameless City: The Divided Earth (First Second Books), Days of Hate (Image Comics), The Dead Hand (Image Comics), Head Lopper (Image Comics), Redlands (Image Comics), Shuri (Marvel Comics), Doctor Strange (Marvel Comics)	
2019	Tamra Bonvillain	Alien 3 (Dark Horse Comics), Batman (DC Comics), Doom Patrol (DC Comics), Moon Girl and Devil Dinosaur (Marvel Comics), Multiple Man (Marvel Comics)	
2019	Nathan Fairbairn	Batman (DC Comics), Batgirl (DC Comics), Birds of Prey (DC Comics), Wonder Woman: Earth One, vol. 2 (DC Comics), Die!Die!Die! (Image Comics)	
2019	Matt Hollingsworth	Batman: White Knight (DC Comics), Seven to Eternity (Image Comics), Wytches (Image Comics)	
2020s
2020	Dave Stewart	Black Hammer (Dark Horse Comics), B.P.R.D.: The Devil You Know (Dark Horse Comics), Hellboy and the BPRD (Dark Horse Comics), Gideon Falls (Image Comics), Silver Surfer Black (Marvel Comics), Spider-Man (Marvel Comics)	
2020	Lorena Alvarez	Hicotea (Nobrow Press)	
2020	Jean-Francois Beaulieu	Middlewest (Image Comics), Outpost Zero (Image Comics)	
2020	Matt Hollingsworth	Batman: Curse of the White Knight (DC Comics), Batman White Knight Presents Von Freeze (DC Comics), Little Bird (Image Comics), November (Image Comics)	
2020	Molly Mendoza	Skip (Nobrow Press)	
2021	Laura Allred	X-Ray Robot (Dark Horse Comics); Bowie: Stardust, Rayguns & Moonage Daydreams (Insight Editions)	
2021	Jean-Francois Beaulieu	Middlewest (Image Comics)	
2021	Gipi	One Story (Fantagraphics)	
2021	Marte Gracia	Empyre (Marvel Comics), X of Swords (Marvel Comics)	
2021	Dave Stewart	Promethee 13:13 (comiXology); Black Hammer (Dark Horse Comics); Gideon Falls (Image Comics); Spider-Man #4-5 (Marvel Comics)	
2021	Matt Wilson	Undiscovered Country (Image Comics); Fire Power (Image Comics/Skybound Entertainment); Thor (Marvel Comics)	
2022	Matt Wilson	Undiscovered Country (Image); Fire Power (Image Skybound); Eternals, Thor, Wolverine (Marvel); Jonna and the Unpossible Monsters (Oni)	
2022	Filipe Andrade/Inês Amaro	The Many Deaths of Laila Starr (BOOM! Studios)	
2022	Terry Dodson	Adventureman (Image Comics)	
2022	Katie O'Neill	The Tea Dragon Tapestry (Oni)	
2022	Jacob Phillips	Destroy All Monsters, Friend of the Devil (Image)	
2023	Jordie Bellaire	The Nice House on the Lake, Suicide Squad: Blaze (DC); Antman, Miracleman by Gaiman & Buckingham: The Silver Age (Marvel)	
2023	Jean-Francois Beaulieu	I Hate Fairyland 2022, Twig (Image)	
2023	Dave McCaig	The Incal: Psychoverse (Humanoids)	
2023	Jacob Phillips	Follow Me Down, The Ghost in You, That Texas Blood (Image)	
2023	Alex Ross and Josh Johnson	The Fantastic Four: Full Circle (Abrams ComicArts)	
2023	Diana Sousa	Critical Role: Vox Machina Origins, The Mighty Nein Origins: Yasha Nydoorin, The Mighty Nein Origins: Fjord Stone, and The Mighty Nein Origins: Caleb Widogast (Dark Horse)	
2024	Jordie Bellaire	Batman, Birds of Prey (DC); Dark Spaces: Hollywood Special (IDW)	
2024	Matt Hollingsworth	Captain America, Doctor Strange, Guardians of the Galaxy, Punisher (Marvel)	
2024	Lee Loughridge	Red Zone (AWA); Edgeworld, Grammaton Punch, Nostalgia (Comixology Originals); The Devil's Cut, Gone, Somna (DSTLRY); Star Trek (IDW); Killadelphia (Image); Hunt. Kill. Repeat. (Mad Cave)	
2024	Dave McCaig	The Sacrificers (Image), The Walking Dead Deluxe (Image Skybound)	
2024	Dean White	Conan the Barbarian (Titan Comics)	
2025	Jordie Bellaire	Absolute Wonder Woman, Birds of Prey, John Constantine, Hellblazer: Dead in America, The Nice House by the Sea (DC); The City Beneath Her Feet (DSTLRY); The Exorcism at 1600 Penn (IDW); W0rldtr33 (Image); G.I. Joe, Duke (Image Skybound)	
2025	Matheus Lopes	Batman & Robin: Year One (DC); Helen of Wyndhorn (Dark Horse)	
2025	Justin Prokowich	Jimi Hendrix: Purple Haze (Titan Comics)	
2025	Javier Rodríguez	Zatanna: Bring Down the House (DC)	
2025	Dave Stewart	Dawnrunner, Free Comic Book Day Comic 2024, The Serpent in the Garden, Hellboy, Hellboy and the BPRD, Paranoid Gardens, Shaolin Cowboy Cruel to Be Kin Silent but Deadly Edition (Dark Horse); Ultramega, Universal Monsters: Creature from the Black Lagoon Lives! (Image Skybound)	
2025	Quentin Zuttion	All Princesses Die Before Dawn (Abrams ComicArts); Beauty Salon (Europe Comics)	
2026	Jordie Bellaire	Absolute Wonder Woman, The Nice House by the Sea (DC); The Exorcism at 1600 Penn (IDW); Assorted Crisis Events, The Department of Truth, Exquisite Corpses, W0RLDTR33 (Image); GI Joe (Image/Skybound); EC Catacomb of Torment, EC Epitaphs from the Abyss (Oni Press)	
2026	Ninakupenda Gaillard	Chickenpox (Henry Holt Books for Young Readers)	
2026	Jesse Lonergan	Drome (23rd St. Books)	
2026	Matheus Lopes	Batman and Robin Year One (DC); The Seasons (Image)	
2026	Javier Rodríguez	Absolute Martian Manhunter (DC)	
2026	José Villarrubia	This Ink Runs Cold (Alan Spiegel Fine Arts); Ghostbox (Comixology Originals); Dracula Book 2: The Brides, The Witcher: The Bear and the Butterfly (Dark Horse); It Rhymes with Takei (Top Shelf)	

== Multiple awards and nominations ==
The following individuals have won Best Coloring or Best Colorist one or more times:

Colorist	Wins	Nominations
Dave Stewart	10	15
Jordie Bellaire	6	7
Chris Ware	4	11
Matt Wilson	3	5
Laura Allred	2	6
Laura DePuy/Laura Martin (Note: Nominated as "Laura DuPuy" in 2000 and 20002, "Laura DuPuy Martin" in 2003, and "Laura Martin" in 2010 and 2017.)	2	5
Steve Oliff/Olyoptics (Note: Nominated as "Steve Oliff" in 1992, "Steve Oliff/Olyoptics" in 1993, and "Steve Oliff and Reuben Rude (Olyoptics)" in 1994.)	2	3
Matt Hollingsworth	1	7
Patricia Mulvihill	1	6
Angus McKie	1	3
Lynn Varley	1	2
Emil Ferris	1	1
Reuben Rude (Note: Nominated as "Steve Oliff and Reuben Rude (Olyoptics)" in 1994)	1	1

The following individuals have received two or more nominations but never won Best Coloring or Best Colorist:

Colorist	Nominations
Jeromy Cox	5
Steve Hamaker	5
Lovern Kindzierski	5 (Note: Nominated as "Lovern Kindzierski/Digital Chameleon" in 1993)
Daniel Vozzo	3
Jean-Francois Beaulieu	3
José Villarrubia	3
Paul Hornschemeier	2
Steven Griffen	2
Jimmy Gownley	2
Elizabeth Breitweiser	2
Matheus Lopes	2
Javier Rodríguez	2

== See also ==
- Eisner Award for Best Publication for Early Readers
- Eisner Award for Best Academic/Scholarly Work
- Eisner Award for Best Writer
- Eisner Award for Best Cover Artist
- Eisner Award for Best Lettering
