= Old Man's Cave (book) =

1999 book by Jeff Smith

- First US edition cover
- Author: Jeff Smith
- Illustrator: Jeff Smith
- Cover artist: Jeff Smith; Elizabeth Lewis
- Language: English
- Series: Bone
- Genre: Fantasy, comedy
- Publisher: Cartoon Books, Scholastic
- Publication date: July 1, 1999 (black & white), 2007 (colour)
- Publication place: United States
- Media type: Hardback and paperback
- Pages: 128
- ISBN: 1-888963-04-2 (hardback); ISBN 1-888963-05-0 (paperback)
- OCLC: 42438963
- Preceded by: Rock Jaw: Master of the Eastern Border
- Followed by: Ghost Circles

Old Man's Cave is the sixth book in the Bone series. It collects issues 33-37 of Jeff Smith's self-published Bone comic book series. It marks the conclusion of the second part of the saga, entitled Solstice. The book was published by Cartoon Books in its original black-and-white form in 1999, and in color by Scholastic Press in 2007.

This book reveals more of the plotting between The Hooded One and the Lord of the Locusts, and follows the inhabitants of the valley as they pick up the pieces after the attacks by the Rat Creature army.

== Synopsis ==
=== Cranky Groundhog ===
Fone Bone is trying to climb a tree so he can see the whole valley while Smiley Bone is at the bottom to catch Fone Bone. A groundhog starts to complain that Smiley is in his hole. then Fone Bone falls into the groundhog's hole. Ted finds them and the groundhog gets scared about rumors going around that Fone Bone had killed Kingdok. Fone Bone is outraged by this, so he, Smiley, and Ted go to warn Thorn.

=== The Hollow Tree ===
The villagers are with Phoney Bone and Thorn, who save the other villagers before the rat creatures come. When they do come, they talk about "the one who bears the star". Euclid, still mad about Phoney's dragonslayer scheme, starts to threaten Phoney.

=== Dragons in the Earth ===
Thorn has left in the night in search of Fone Bone, while Phoney Bone and three of the villagers head for Old Man's Cave, where they are met by Gran'ma Ben and Lucius. Meanwhile, Fone and Smiley have made it down from the mountains. They are ambushed by Rat Creatures, but Thorn scares the Rat Creatures off.

Deep in the mountains, the Lord of the Locusts has doubts that "the one who bears the star" (Phoney Bone), with whom the Hooded One seems obsessed, is as powerful as the Hooded One believes, but allows the search for him to continue.

=== Protection Spell ===
Thorn, Fone, and Smiley lie low for a few days while planning an attack on The Hooded One. Thorn explains how she believes The Hooded One plans to use her and Phoney to speed the release of the Lord of the Locusts from the stone of the mountains. She also explains her mistrust of Gran'ma Ben - Thorn believes the tale of how her parents were betrayed by the nursemaid is a lie; she never had a nursemaid. Meanwhile, The Hooded One approaches Roque Ja and asks him to recapture the Bones.

At Old Man's Cave, the survivors of the Rat Creature attack are gathered, along with a large group of Veni Yan warriors. Gran'ma Ben tells Phoney Bone that the dragons' Queen, Mim, kept the Dreaming in balance until the Lord of the Locusts drove her insane, and the other dragons were forced to turn Mim to stone. The Hooded One, she tells him, wants to sacrifice him to free the Lord of the Locusts.

=== Wolf Call ===
Thorn returns to the farmhouse to collect her belongings. She plans to take on The Hooded One alone; but the Bones convince her to trust Gran'ma Ben, and the three set off for Old Man's Cave. Meanwhile, a patrol of villagers and Veni Yan warriors, led by Lucius Down, scout the area for Rat Creatures. Lucius comes across The Hooded One, who assumes the appearance of the woman killed along with Thorn's parents: alive and not looking a day older, to distract Lucius from the Rat Creatures' attack.

Later, at Old Man's Cave, with no word of Lucius Down and his scout party, Gran'ma Ben continues filling in Phoney on the history of the valley and the nature of the Dreaming. Soon after, Lucius' party arrives at the cave, many of them wounded, with a pack of Rat Creatures still in pursuit.

=== Blood Moon ===
Lucius Down relates to Gran'ma Ben that the Hooded One is her now-undead sister, Briar Harvestar. Gran'ma Ben tells him that despite pleading with the council of dragons at Deren Gard, they refused to get involved in the fight, meaning the valley folk must face her and her Rat Creature armies alone. The villagers argue over whether or not to hand Phoney Bone, "the one who bears the star", over to The Hooded One to appease her, and in the confusion Phoney slips away, leaving his star-bearing shirt behind. Gran'ma Ben goes after him, but Roque Ja attacks her. Thorn and Fone enter the fray, but she and Phoney are captured. Fone Bone, knocked senseless, sees in his dreams the Great Red Dragon, who hands him the royal medallion and orders him to save Thorn.

Some time later, at the ancient temple high in the mountains, The Hooded One prepares to sacrifice Phoney to the Lord of the Locusts. Phoney insists that there is a case of mistaken identity and that Briar has the wrong person, but she reveals a huge inflatable likeness of Phoney: the runaway balloon from his failed attempt to become Mayor of Boneville. With its fierce expression and the banner reading "Phoncible P. Bone will get you" (the end torn off; intact it read "...will get your vote", as Phoney explains), Briar took it as an omen that he would challenge her, and that she could sacrifice him to free the Lord of the Locusts. Gran'ma Ben confirms Briar's mistake, and the locusts that supported Briar's shriveled body leave her, as punishment by the Lord of the Locusts, and try to enter Thorn, but Fone Bone drives them away with the royal medallion, and Thorn then joins the others from the collapsing mountain temple.
