= Stupid, Stupid Rat Tails =

Comic book by Tom Sniegoski

Stupid, Stupid Rat Tales
- Cover of trade paperback

Publication information
- Publisher: Cartoon Books
- Format: mini-series
- Publication date: 1998-2000
- No. of issues: 3

Creative team
- Written by: Tom Sniegoski
- Artist(s): Jeff Smith, Stan Sakai

Tall Tales: The Adventures of Big Johnson Bone, Frontier Hero is a prequel to the Eisner Award-winning comic book Bone by Jeff Smith. It was initially published in 1998 as a three- issue mini-series before being collected in a trade paperback (ISBN 1-888963-06-9) in 2000.

Whereas the other spin-off, Rose, focuses on the valley people from the story, Stupid, Stupid Rat-Tails focuses on the formation of Boneville, the hometown of the Bones. The series is drawn but not written by Smith. The writer is Tom Sniegoski. The backup feature included in the trade paperback collection, Riblet, is written by Sniegoski and drawn by Usagi Yojimbo creator Stan Sakai. The series was yet again reprinted in the Scholastic collection Tall Tales, released in August 2010. The Riblet backup story was reprinted in Scholastic's More Tall Tales collection, published in September 2023.

== Plot ==
In the principal story, the Bones' culture hero, Big Johnson Bone, has suffered the disappearance of compatriot Gertie Bone, and is traveling with Mr. Pip: a cantankerous capuchin monkey. En route, Johnson and Pip are blown by a tornado into the valley of the earlier Bone comics, where they learn that the antagonist Rat Creatures are attacking every other inhabitant thereof. Accompanied by some local animals, and the miniature dragon Stillman, Johnson invades the Rat Creatures' territory to recover their hostages; but finds the latter imprisoned alive in the entrails of Tyson, the son of the Rat Creatures' Queen Maude. There, Johnson and his companions give Tyson indigestion, while Pip, Stillman, and the others are taken to Maude's dungeon. Stillman's fiery breath enables their escape, while Johnson's music prompts Tyson to disgorge him and the others. Trying to recapture them, Tyson severs his own tail, and Johnson severs Maude's to make a hat for himself. Thereafter Johnson and Pip establish a dry-goods store, which later becomes the center of Boneville. Upon their departure, Stillman is commended for protecting the animals by the Great Red Dragon of the earlier series, and Maude orders that all Rat Creatures be deprived of their tails annually, to compensate for the loss of her own.
