= Eyes of the Storm =

1996 comic book by Jeff Smith

- First US edition cover
- Author: Jeff Smith
- Illustrator: Jeff Smith
- Cover artist: Jeff Smith; David Reed (colourist)
- Language: English
- Series: Bone
- Genre: Fantasy, comedy
- Publisher: Cartoon Books
- Publication date: 1996
- Publication place: United States
- Media type: Hardback and paperback
- Pages: 184
- ISBN: 0-9636609-7-7 (hardback); ISBN 0-9636609-6-9 (paperback)
- OCLC: 50631231
- Preceded by: The Great Cow Race
- Followed by: The Dragonslayer

Eyes of the Storm is the third book in the Bone series. It collects issues 12-19 of Jeff Smith's Bone comic book series along with 5 previously unpublished story pages and 9 new illustrations. It marks the conclusion of the first part of the saga, titled "Vernal Equinox". The book was first published by Cartoon Books in its original black-and-white form in 1996. Paperback and hardback coloured editions were published in 2006 by Scholastic.

== Synopsis ==
=== Moby Bone ===
The Great Red Dragon interrupts Fone Bone's nightmare. The following day, Fone Bone asks him about the dream, and the Dragon hints that he entered the dream on purpose. Later, the Bone cousins are absorbed in rebuilding Grandma Ben's farm.

=== Double or Nothing ===
While Phoney, Smiley, and Lucius continue to Barrelhaven through the rain, Phoney wagers that he can better operate Lucius' tavern than can Lucius himself. When they arrive at the bar, the tavern goers immediately attack Phoney Bone and Smiley Bone, but Lucius objects, on grounds that their fiscal debts have been paid and that they earlier humiliated themselves by belief in Phoney's confidence trick. He then orders the bet to commence.

=== Mending Fences ===
When Gran'ma Ben apologizes to Bone for accusing him of causing trouble, Fone Bone shows her the map discovered in the initial book by Smiley, and she reveals that Thorn's parents were the monarchs of the realm throughout the generation-long war with the Rat Creatures, and that Thorn was moved from the palace during the "Nights of Lightning" (a series of surprise attacks by the Rat Creatures), to safety with the Dragons; but the escort party was betrayed by an accompanying nursemaid, and Thorn's parents killed. It is revealed that a dangerous, disembodied intelligence called the Lord of the Locusts has reawoken, and has the Hooded One under its command.

=== Dreams ===
Fone Bone attempts to comfort Thorn after Gran'ma Ben's revelations. At the tavern, Smiley Bone draws all the customers to the Bones' side of the bar by giving beer for no cost; but Phoney Bone stops him. The crowd are about to attack them, when Smiley Bone wishes that Fone Bone's dragon was there to protect them, and they demand what he means by this.

=== Things That Go Bump in the Night ===
Tales of a dragon draw the townsfolk to Phoney's side of the Barrelhaven bar, and Phoney proclaims himself a dragon slayer. A hooded stranger wearing a pendant with a royal crest visits the Barrelhaven, bringing Lucius news that a huge army of Rat Creatures is approaching. Gran'ma Ben, hearing the news from Lucius via Ted the bug, and fearing for Thorn's safety, presents Thorn with her old sword and shield and insists on departure.
