= Bone (comics) =

Comic book series by Jeff Smith

- Cover of Bone #1 (July 1991); This image was later used for the covers of Bone: Out from Boneville and Bone: Handbook.

Publication information
- Publisher: Cartoon Books (self-published); Image Comics (issues #21–27)
- Schedule: Every other month, with several delays
- Format: Limited series
- Genre: Fantasy, comedy
- Publication date: July 1991 – June 2004
- No. of issues: 55
- Main characters: The Bone cousins (Fone Bone, Phoney Bone & Smiley Bone); Thorn Harvestar; Gran'ma Ben; Lucius Down

Creative team
- Written by: Jeff Smith
- Artist: Jeff Smith
- Colorist(s): Steve Hamaker; Tom Gaadt

Bone is an American fantasy comic book limited series written and illustrated by Jeff Smith, originally serialized in 55 irregularly released issues from 1991 to 2004. The series is primarily self-published by Smith's company, Cartoon Books; it was also briefly published by Image Comics. The issues were collected into nine volumes, as well as a single omnibus volume. From 2005 to 2009, color editions of the original volumes were published by Scholastic's Graphix imprint. The series intertwines comedy and dark fantasy.

Bone has received critical acclaim from critics and audiences and numerous awards, among them ten Eisner Awards and eleven Harvey Awards.

== Plot ==
Bone follows the eponymous Bone cousins, who appear as white-skinned bone shaped cartoon humanoids: everyman Fone Bone, wealthy and self-serving Phoncible P. "Phoney" Bone, and simpleminded Smiley Bone. When Phoney mounts an ill-fated campaign for mayor, he is forced out of their hometown of Boneville, with Smiley and a reluctant Fone Bone following him. After the cousins find themselves in a desert, Smiley finds a hand-drawn map that they use to navigate their way across the fantasy landscape. The cousins are separated by a swarm of locusts and individually end up in a large valley, a journey made more difficult by the pursuing Rat Creatures.

Eventually, they reunite at the Barrelhaven tavern, where they are taken in by a girl named Thorn and her grandmother, "Gran'ma Ben". Fone Bone instantly develops a crush on Thorn and repeatedly attempts to express his love through poetry. As they stay longer in the Valley, they learn that it is under threat from the Rat Creatures, led by Kingdok, and the mysterious ”Hooded One" who serves an ancient evil known as the Lord of the Locusts. As Thorn learns that she and Gran'ma Ben are the only survivors of the Valley's royal family, the Bones are gradually drawn into the events around them, compelling them on a hero's journey to help free the Valley.

== Analysis ==
Bone has been described as genre-defying. Smith claims that the series was not originally written for an adolescent audience, though adolescents comprise its largest readership. Throughout its run, Bone shifts from a largely comical series to a more serious tone as the characters and setting develop. It is additionally said to have a "darker subtext about power and evil".

Smith made the decision to illustrate Bone in black-and-white, which critics speculate is so that he could maintain the clear lines that allow for exaggerated characters that contrast their subtle, detailed backgrounds.

The series is mainly set in the Valley, though Boneville is mentioned throughout. Boneville is never actually shown, but is implied to be technologically contemporary, while the Valley is depicted as medieval, inasmuch as its citizens employ a barter system, weapons, and modes of transportation similar to those of the Middle Ages, and Phoney persistently refers to the people of the Valley as "yokels".

== Publication history ==
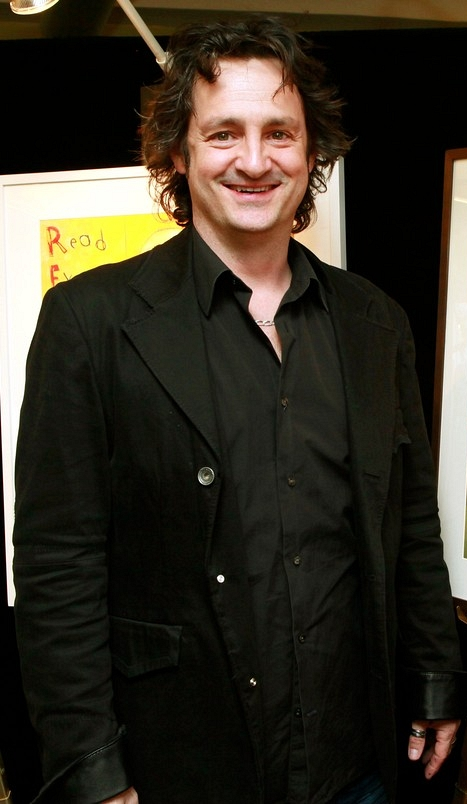
Jeff Smith, the creator of the series, posing in 2011 at an event in New York

Smith originated Bone as a sketch he drew as a child, resembling a telephone handset receiver. This original drawing, a frowning character with its mouth wide open, resembled characteristics of who would become the Bone cousins. When Smith was ten, he began creating comics featuring the characters.

The comics had many major influences throughout their creation. Smith mostly modeled Bone structurally around Mark Twain's Huckleberry Finn. He enjoyed how it "start(s) off very simple, almost like children's stories ... but as it goes on, it gets a little darker, and the themes become a little more sophisticated and more complex". Smith was also inspired by Carl Barks' character Scrooge McDuck. Smith said that he "always wanted Uncle Scrooge to go on a longer adventure. I thought, 'Man, if you could just get a comic book of that quality, the length of say, War and Peace, or The Odyssey or something, that would be something I would love to read, and even as a kid I looked everywhere for that book, that Uncle Scrooge story that was 1,100 pages long".

Other influences in this regard include the original Star Wars trilogy, J.R.R. Tolkien's The Lord of the Rings and the classic fairy tales and mythologies that inspired those works. Moby Dick, Smith's favorite book, is cited for its multi-layered narrative and symbolism, and numerous references to it are placed throughout Bone. Bone was also influenced by other comics, including Charles Schulz's Peanuts and Walt Kelly's Pogo.

While Smith attended the Ohio State University, he created a comic strip titled Thorn for the student newspaper, The Lantern, which included some of the characters who later featured in Bone.

After college, Smith and his friends produced animation work on commission in their studio, Character Builders Inc., but Smith eventually decided against an animation career. Seeking instead to develop a comic book series, and convinced by the successes of Frank Miller's The Dark Knight Returns and Art Spiegelman's Maus that a serious comic book with a beginning, middle and end structure was both artistically and commercially viable, Smith decided to produce Bone.

In 1991, Smith launched his company, Cartoon Books, to publish the series. Initially, Smith self-published the series, doing all of the work to produce and distribute the series through his business himself; this made it difficult for Smith to focus on writing and drawing the book, and as a result, he fell behind in his production. To solve this, he asked his wife, Vijaya Iyer, to resign from her job at a Silicon Valley startup company and serve as president of Cartoon Books, managing the business related to the series. Smith was able to refocus on his work on Bone, and sales improved. In 1995, Smith began briefly publishing Bone through Image Comics. Smith believed this would be a temporary arrangement, and to maintain the book's place in catalogs, the collected volumes remained under the Cartoon Books label. Bone ended with its 55th issue, dated June 2004. The back cover has, in place of the usual comic panel, a black-and-white photo of Smith in his studio drawing the last page on May 10 of that year.

=== Individual volumes ===
Collected volumes of Bone
Volume	Title	Original ed.	Colored ed.	Issues adapted
1	Out from Boneville	1995	2005	1–6
2	The Great Cow Race	1995	2005	7–11 (+13.5)
3	Eyes of the Storm	1996	2006	12–19
4	The Dragonslayer	1997	2006	20–27
5	Rock Jaw: Master of the Eastern Border	1998	2007	28–32
6	Old Man's Cave	1999	2007	33–37
7	Ghost Circles	2001	2008	38–43
8	Treasure Hunters	2002	2008	44–49
9	Crown of Horns	2004	2009	50–55

The series was initially collected, six issues at a time, in three volumes of The Collected Bone Adventures (1993-1995). These went out of print when Smith decided to collect the story arc acts instead. The Bone Reader (1996) was released concurrent with the switch to Image Comics to bring new readers up to speed and to collect issues #13 1/2 and 19 for early adopters.

Other books published in the color series but not part of the main storyline are the prequel Rose, illustrated by Charles Vess; the Bone Handbook; and the anthology books Tall Tales and More Tall Tales.

Selected excerpts from Bone were reprinted in Disney Adventures, first in 1994 and later in 1997 through 1998. The issues usually consisted of 7–9 pages a month and were colored. The pages were also censored to remove smoking and drinking references and any innuendo involving Thorn and Fone Bone. There was also an exclusive story for Disney Adventures by Smith, featuring Fone and Phoney following a "treasure map"; it was reprinted in The Bone Reader and Tall Tales.

The series was split into three-story arcs, each having two names, one being the original arc name, the other being the name used in the one volume edition, respectively as follows. The first arc lasted from issues #1–19 (volumes #1–3, June 1991 – August 1995) being named "Vernal Equinox", or "The Valley". It was the longest running arc (in terms of time) running for four years and one month. The main story in issue #13.5, "Up on the Roof", was reprinted as chapter six in The Great Cow Race collected edition, therefore making it part of "Vernal Equinox". The second arc was named "Solstice", or "Phoney Strikes Back". The arc lasted from issues #20–37 (volumes #4–6, October 1995 – August 1999). It is tied as the longest running arc in issues with the third arc (lasting 19 issues). The third arc, "Harvest" or "Friends & Enemies'", lasted from issues #38–55 (volumes #7–9, August 2000 – June 2004).

=== Color editions ===
In 2005, Scholastic, under its newly established Graphix imprint, began reissuing the nine individual volumes in full color by Steve Hamaker. In 2006, HarperCollins began publishing the full color editions for the UK market.

=== Omnibus edition ===
Cover art of Bone: The Complete Cartoon Epic in One Volume

An omnibus edition, compiling all 55 issues in one volume (ISBN 1-888963-14-X), was released originally by Cartoon Books imprint in a paperback volume. This release was intended to celebrate both the end of the series and the release of the full-color editions. First released in 2004 and promoted as only a limited print run being available, this edition has been reprinted several times since.

In addition to the paperback release, a signed limited edition hardcover release was issued. The deluxe hardcover featured gold embossed lettering on the cover, gilded edges, and a cloth ribbon bookmark. The end pages are printed with a map of The Valley and it comes with a full-color signed and numbered bookplate. This release originally sold for around $125 (USD) and was initially limited to 2,000 copies. The series has been reprinted 13 times, also featuring a signed limited edition of the 13th pressing version sold during November 2009.

The collection won the 2005 Eisner Award for Best Graphic Album-Reprint, and was listed at No. 3 in Time magazine's "Best Comix of 2004". Reviewer Andrew Arnold said of the collection, which was published at the conclusion of the monthly series: "As sweeping as the Lord of the Rings cycle, but much funnier ... Smith imbues even simple dialogue panels with animation. Now that it's finished Bone should join the ranks of Lord of the Rings and Harry Potter in the young adult pantheon".

=== Full-color omnibus edition ===
In November 2011, for its 20th anniversary, a full-color, omnibus edition was released. It includes a special section consisting of a cover gallery of the original comics, an illustrated timeline of Bone's 20-year history, and an essay by author Smith. A special edition was also released that included the book, a signed print by Jeff Smith, a Phoney Bone gold coin, three pewter bone figures of Fone Bone, Phoney Bone and Smiley Bone, a copy of The Cartoonist documentary DVD, and a miniature facsimile of the first issue, all held in a box decorated with an illustration of Fone Bone.

=== Related works ===
- Thorn: Tales from the Lantern: This comic strip was produced by Smith during college, featuring Thorn as the protagonist and Fone Bone and Phoney Bone as supporting characters. The strip was partially collected in a in the self-published paperback Thorn: Tales from the Lantern in 1983. It sold 1000 copies, and is currently out of print. A new, complete collection was published in 2024, following a successful Kickstarter campaign.
- Rose (with Charles Vess): tells the origins of Rose, Thorn, and Lucius.
- Stupid, Stupid Rat-tails: The Adventures of Big Johnson Bone, Frontier Hero (with Tom Sniegoski and Stan Sakai)
- Bone: Tall Tales: The story shows Smiley and Bartleby after the events in the main series. It features them telling tall tales to three Bone brothers (Ringo, Bingo and Todd). It is a repackaging of Stupid, Stupid Rat Tails, including a Disney Adventures short and new material. It was released on August 1, 2010. This spin-off mainly focuses on Big Johnson Bone's (ancestor to the Bone cousins) adventures, some time before the cousins' adventures in the Valley, though there is one short where Fone and Phoney follow a 'treasure map', which is later revealed as a joke by Thorn, who wanted the two to do the laundry. One story with Big Johnson Bone depicts his discovery of the Valley with his monkey, Mr. Pip. In Bone Vol. 7, Ghost Circles, Bartleby mentions that before Rat Creatures had "long, beautiful, hairless tails", which have to be cut off when the Rat Creature reaches one year of age, out of fear that they will be dragged away by their tails by a monster named Jekk. In Tall Tales, the Jekk is revealed to be Big Johnson Bone, who swung them around by their tails when they attacked him, and due to this (and the fact the Queen and her son had their tails removed by Big Johnson) they decided to cut their tails so they could never be used against them again. In this, some Royal Rat Creatures (in particular, Tyson, the queen’s son) grow to be quite large, possibly explaining Kingdok, the Rat Creature ruler, to be of such great size comparatively to the other Rat Creatures. The Red Dragon also appears in the story.
- Bone Handbook is a 128-page handbook that chronicles the series and is accompanied by sketches, interviews, etc. The book was released in February 2010.
- Bone: Quest for the Spark, a trilogy of illustrated prose novels, written by Tom Sniegoski, following the adventures of new Bones in their quest in the Valley. The first volume was released on February 1, 2011. A few of the characters from the original series are in the story, such as the Two Stupid Rat Creatures and Roderick the Raccoon, from the fifth trade paperback collection, Rock Jaw, Master of the Eastern Border. Thorn Harvestar and Gran'ma Ben are also in the trilogy. Though the Bone cousins are mentioned in passing, they are absent from the trilogy. Part II was released on February 1, 2012. The story continues from Part 1, putting the main characters against the Nacht, a dark creature that puts nearly everyone in the Valley to sleep. Part III was released on February 1, 2013.
- Smiley's Dream Book is a 2018 children's book that presumably takes place in Boneville after the series’ conclusion. In it, Smiley has a dream in which he meets several birds before waking up and walking around.(ISBN 9780545674775).
- Bone Adventures is a 2020 children's book that reprints Smiley's Dream Book and features a prequel story from the Bone cousin's childhood.(ISBN 9781338620672).(ISBN 9781338726381)
- Bone: More Tall Tales (2023) reprints in color the "Riblet" story by Tom Sniegoski & Stan Sakai from Bone #31–35, and the story from Coda, with additional new material.(ISBN 9781338726381)

=== Special one-shots ===
- Bone: Holiday Special ("Hero" Premiere Edition, 1993, Warrior Publications, 14 pages)

This was a Hero Premiere Edition bundled with Hero Illustrated magazine. It includes a short story where the Bone cousins celebrate Winter Solstice, and also a Jeff Smith interview and sketches. It is featured in the Crown of Horns collection and the final issue of the series.

- Bone No. 13 ½ (Jan 1995, Wizard, 28 pages)

This was a free comic book mail-in offer through Wizard magazine. As was also common with Wizard magazine comic offers, there was a special gold foil cover variant where the Bone title on the cover is embossed in gold foil. It came in a rigid mylar sleeve and a certificate of authenticity. There is a short story that fits in between No. 13 and 14 of the regular series, and is included in Bone Vol. 2: The Great Cow Race. This special also includes a Jeff Smith interview and sketches.

- Bone Sourcebook (1995, Image Comics, 16 pages with wrap-around cover)

This was a free promotional book given out at 1995 San Diego Comic-con and it also polybagged with Wizard magazine. This sourcebook was published to celebrate the move of the Bone series from self-publishing to Image Comics, where it stayed for only 7 issues before Jeff Smith took it back to self-publishing.

It includes an introduction by Jeff Smith & biography, character profiles, color poster by Jim Lee, story timeline, upcoming storyline, and shipping schedule.

- Bone No. 1 Tenth Anniversary Edition (2001, Cartoon Books)

To celebrate its 10-year anniversary, a special color edition of Bone No. 1 was released with a free collectible Fone Bone PVC figure and a full color Phoney Bone Gazillion dollar bill. This special edition included a new cover, a new afterword by Jeff Smith, and an illustrated eight-page commentary by comics historian R. C. Harvey, and the original artwork was digitally remastered in full color.

- Bone Coda (2016, Cartoon Books)

To celebrate its 25-year anniversary, Cartoon Books released Bone: Coda, a 120-page graphic novel that includes a 32-page short story featuring the Bone cousins returning to their home town of Boneville after the events of the last issue of Bone series, and the first print version of the e-book The BONE Companion by Stephen Weiner, illustrated with comic panels and photos.

== Characters ==
=== Main characters ===
- Fone Bone: The hero of the series, Fone Bone is the most courageous of the Bones but also the youngest. He and his cousin Smiley Bone help their other cousin Phoney Bone escape from Boneville after he upset the villagers, and get stuck in the Valley. He is passionate about his favorite book, Moby-Dick, and is the most level-headed and the smartest of the three Bone cousins. He has an unrequited crush on Thorn Harvestar. Fone Bone is very wary of his cousin Phoney's schemes, and always suspects him of something. The suspicion usually turns out right, and Fone is often angered by Phoney not seeming to care about the Valley (or the people in it), as Phoney constantly tries to leave to return to Boneville. After the Hooded One realizes Phoney Bone is not the person she needs to complete her ritual to revive Mim, the queen of the dragons, and realizes that Thorn is too powerful for her to control, she then seeks Fone, for in Ghost Circles, Vol. 7 of the series, it is revealed that Fone has the Locust inside him too, which likely came from either his encounter in Rock Jaw, Master of the Eastern Border, when he is knocked off a cliff, or in Old Man's Cave, when he rescues Thorn from the locusts by putting the Dragon Necklace on her. It is later taken out in Ghost Circles by Thorn, who takes it herself, because she was told to by her dead mother in a Ghost Circle. Fone remains unaware of this until Crown of Horns, when they try to destroy the locust by touching the sacred Crown of Horns. He saves the day by touching the Crown of Horns while holding Thorn's hand, who is incapacitated on the ground, stuck in Kingdok's jaws, whom she killed. There they are given a choice to live or die (there is a bright light, supposedly the afterlife/heaven); both choose 'live'. Thorn and Fone are both given pieces of the Crown of Horns as teeth which were knocked out in a fight with Tarsil's followers. The teeth apparently cause rapid healing of their injuries. His name is derived from Fonebone, the recurring surname that Don Martin gave to many of the characters that appeared in his Mad magazine strips. Wizard magazine ranked Fone Bone as the 28th-greatest comic book character of all time. IGN also ranked Fone Bone as the 60th-greatest comic book hero of all time, stating that "his good nature and his unrequited love for his ally Thorn make Fone the heart and soul of this fantastical book."
- Phoncible P. "Phoney" Bone: Manipulative and greedy, Phoney Bone is the eldest and least courageous of the Bones and he will do anything to get rich. Run out of Boneville by an angry mob of villagers after trying to run for mayor of Boneville, his greediness and selfishness make an enemy of anyone who crosses him in the Valley. Referred to by the Hooded One as "The One Who Bears The Star" (due to the star on the T-shirt he wears), Phoney is sought after by the Rat Creature army though he does not know why (later it is revealed that the Hooded One erroneously believed a giant balloon of Phoney used in his campaign for mayor of Boneville that fell in her lair to be an omen that Phoney could be used to fulfill her agenda, as the balloon, which originally featured the words “Phoney Bone will get your vote” and became “Phoney Bone will get you”.). Though he is selfish, he is very protective of his cousins when he needs to be and shows he really cares about them. For example, when he is approached by The Hooded One who proceeds to threaten Fone Bone, Phoncible becomes angry and warns The Hooded One to stay away from Fone. A monologue he delivers late in the series reveals that his greed and selfishness are the result of his having been forced to raise Fone and Smiley after they were orphaned, forcing him to resort to dirty schemes to provide for them. At the end of the series he finally displays a courageous side, as he fought the Pawans and the Rat Creatures along with Grand'ma Ben and her army, and he appeared to retreat from the final battle only to return with armed reinforcements; though they arrive too late he still claims to be a hero.
- Smiley Bone: The tallest of the Bones, the middle cousin and arguably the least intelligent, he plays a one-string instrument resembling a lute (but variously referred to throughout the series as a "banjo" or "guitar"). Smiley is often seen smoking a cigar, and often irritates characters with his simple-mindedness, even when seeking to help people, as when Lucius refers to Smiley's help as "torture" in The Great Cow Race. He takes kindly to a Rat Creature cub, whom he names Bartleby, and through his nurturing of Bartleby, depth of maturity is revealed in his character. When he and his cousins were children, Phoney made him steal pies off windowsills, because he was the tallest, and apparently they were poor to the point where they could not afford food. Phoney mentions that when he became rich, Smiley made him pay everyone back. Phoney Bone always employs Smiley in his scams, like in the cow race (The Great Cow Race). Sometimes Smiley shows a penchant for intelligence, as when, in Vol. 9 Crown of Horns, he devises a plan during the siege of Atheia. The plan is to feed the two stupid Rat Creatures (whom Smiley captured as they tried to infiltrate the city) quiche, then let them go "accidentally", so the Rat Creatures would tell their leaders that Atheia could withstand the siege, under the logic that if they could feed their prisoners quiche, they presumably have enough food to feed themselves making a siege hopeless. Later, he had aided Phoney in bringing armed reinforcements, though they arrived too late as the actions of the dragons ended the war. Though Smiley has his joyful and happy-go-lucky personality throughout the series, he also has his serious and sorrow moments while he had grown more mature when he first took care of Bartleby. At the later half of the series after Rock Jaw: Master of the Eastern Border, Smiley had shown more concern about the reality of the war in the Valley, as he maintained cautiousness for his friends in times of danger. Smiley is also fiercely protective of Bartleby; he refused to leave the cub behind despite Gran'ma Ben's strict orders and he went as far as to tackle a Venu guard to help Bartleby escape from an angry mob following an accidental exposure. Smiley later mourned Lucius and expressed sadness at leaving the Valley and saying goodbye to his friends and allies.

=== Valley characters ===
Thorn Harvestar
Seemingly a simple farm girl, it is soon revealed that she is heir to the throne of Atheia. She is also a "Veni-Yan-Cari" (the awakened one), one who can see into the "dreaming", a kind of parallel existence, or "spirit world". Thorn has excellent courage as well as fantastic powers, such as escaping through a landslide blindfolded, flying, and jumping a castle wall without injuring herself. In a sense she can do anything if she can "concentrate her dreaming". Fone Bone falls in love with her at their first meeting. She starts off sweet and innocent, but later in The Dragonslayer, when the seriousness and reality of everything dawns on her, she takes on a more mature and tougher personality.

Rose "Gran'ma" Ben (born Rose Harvestar)
Thorn's grandmother, a tough-as-nails farmer who races against cows on foot as a hobby, and always wins. An immensely strong person, it is revealed that she is the former Queen of Atheia who escaped to Barrelhaven with Lucius Down to protect and safeguard Thorn.

Lucius Down
A large, gruff, older man who is described as over seven feet tall and over 300 pounds. Lucius is so powerful he could scare even Euclid into submission. He runs the Barrelhaven Tavern, and is the foil for almost all of Phoney Bone's schemes. In the later books we find that Jonathan Oaks was like a son to him. He was previously Captain of the Queen's guard and it was hinted he had a history with Gran'ma Ben, only to reveal later that he had 'picked the wrong girl', instead falling in love with her sister, Briar, whose motive in the affair was to hurt Rose. He was later in love with Rose Harvestar. Before the Rat Creatures destroy his tavern, he relocates to Old Man's Cave, where he becomes Captain of an ill-equipped infantry of Barrelhaven farmers. After the volcano erupts, he leads the farmers and Veni Yan south, arriving in time for the battle on Sinner's Rock. When the Hooded One prepares to kill Rose, Lucius grabs onto her just as she is destroyed; the resulting surge in power kills Lucius. His body is later taken north and buried behind the rebuilt Barrelhaven Tavern.

The Great Red Dragon
The son of the great dragon Mim, The Great Red Dragon is often Fone Bone's last-minute savior. The Red Dragon appears when he is most needed. Gran'ma Ben does not trust him, regardless of how many times he has saved her or her friends from harm. The Great Red Dragon seems to be incredibly ancient. In a sequence that shows the land during the Dragons' reign, supposedly the beginning of time, the Great Red Dragon can be seen fighting Mim along with other dragons. As said in the prequel Stupid, Stupid Rat Tails, he is Mim's son and he was part of the group that trapped her in stone when the Valley was made. He took care of Thorn during the Great War while Rose searched for a place for them to hide. He is also seen at the end of Stupid, Stupid Rat Tails during the time of Boneville's founding by Big Johnson Bone. Fone Bone indicates that he has a baritone voice. The dragon itself does not appear to have a name, beyond "The Great Red Dragon". If he has one, it is unknown to anyone but himself.

Jonathan Oaks
A small, often outspoken villager who works for Lucius at the Barrelhaven, and views Lucius as a hero. He is saved from an ambush from the rat creatures in Old Man's Cave after being wounded severely. It is suggested in Ghost Circles that he ultimately does not survive his wounds.

Wendell
One of Lucius' tough "bar-room boys" and the tinsmith of Barrelhaven. Outspoken in the early issues (he and Euclid have more than once threatened to trounce Phoney Bone), he becomes more introverted once the reality of the war presents itself. He often changes sides and his mind. He goes from hating the Bones and stick-eaters (Veni-Yan warriors) to following them, then hating the Bones again (though he gets along with Fone Bone following the victory of the war). He seems to be a powerful ally to have in his village and is often followed by the villagers when he changes sides. Despite his skinny appearance, he is implied to be just as strong as Euclid.

Euclid
Along with Jonathan and Wendell, one of the "bar-room boys". He is depicted as very large and muscular, and often wishes to resort to physical force to solve problems. He is consumed by a ghost circle after the volcano explosion, but returns after Thorn destroys the ghost circles.

Rory
A third bar-room boy. Is almost always present near Wendell, Euclid, and Jonathan, but rarely speaks. None of his comments give much of a hint to his personality. It is implied that he is a total follower with little or no influence.

Ted
A helpful Acanalonia bivittata, or planthopper, who appears as a recurring supporting character. Often mistaken for a leaf, Ted is the first creature Fone Bone encounters when he enters the valley and the two become fast friends. He harbors a strange link to the Red Dragon and has an older brother who is several hundred times his size. He is able to perform magical enchantments and has the ability to detect Ghost Circles.

Miss Possum
A female opossum who is the mother to the three possum kids, she is likewise a caring, motherly figure to everyone in the valley. She often has something to give to Fone Bone when she sees him, such as sealing putty, which Fone mistakenly eats a little of.

The Possum Kids
Three young opossums with a thirst for adventure. They have a knack for getting into trouble which then Fone Bone saves them from, but they are resourceful and cunning, and play a significant part in Rock Jaw. The possums look suspiciously like Pogo the possum from Walt Kelly's comic strip.

=== Main antagonists ===
The Hooded One (Briar Harvestar)
Servant of the Lord of the Locusts, Kingdok's superior, and the main antagonist. It is implied that The Hooded One is a former Veni Yan warrior, as she wears a similar robe and hood. It is later revealed that the Hooded One is Briar Harvestar, the elder sister of Gran'ma Ben and the grand-aunt of Thorn. It is heavily implied that her antagonism is based on nothing more than jealousy of Rose, who was apparently her mom's favorite between the two and had the affection of Lucius. When the Rat Creatures invaded in the great war, she betrayed the Royal family by showing the Rat Creatures the secret escape passage Thorn had used to escape the palace. When the King, Thorn's father, learned of this betrayal, he cut her in half with an abandoned harvesting scythe, which the Hooded One now carries as a weapon that can now cut through steel and rock. Briar was possessed and resurrected by a swarm of locusts. She is killed when her master, the Lord of the Locusts, is destroyed. It is suggested by some of her actions throughout the storyline that being the servant of the Lord of the Locusts drove her insane. Despite this, she is shown to be intellectual, being an effective rabble-rouser and even converting several humans to her side. Additionally, her proficiency with a scythe is a major part of her character, as she is almost always seen with the scythe and can use it easily.

Kingdok
A giant rat creature, ruler of the horde of rat creatures and lackey of the Lord of the Locusts. Although he is ego-maniacal and cruel, he is prone to superstition and easily manipulated by The Hooded One. He carries a golden spiked club around with him, until Thorn cuts off his right arm. Roque Ja at one point attacks Kingdok and rips out his tongue, which he keeps as a trophy. A possible continuity error is that while Roque Ja is bragging about owning the tongue, Kingdok cannot speak, but later speaks clearly to the Hooded One; after that, he attempts to say "kill you", and it comes out "gill yoo", just as one would speak without a tongue. This may be an effect of the Hooded One's power; while the Hooded One is alive he can speak, but after she is destroyed he cannot. Afterwards, Kingdok spends most of his time lumbering about underground to reach the Crown of Horns. At the end of the novel, he faces Thorn before she can touch the Crown of Horns. Having been stripped of his authority, dignity, and physical health over the course of the series, he demands that Thorn face him in a life or death battle. He reveals that he had been the one to kill her parents by eating them, and proceeds to bite Thorn's leg when she tries to get around him. He dies when Thorn stabs him shortly thereafter. In the Bone Handbook, Jeff Smith says Kingdok's design (large body and legs, but small arms) was largely influenced by the anatomy of a tyrannosaurus rex.

Fone Bone's two rat creatures
Two rat creature soldiers, one blue, one brown, who have a particular interest in devouring the Bone cousins, and Fone Bone in particular. The two are rather incompetent, once deserting the army after their disobedience costs Kingdok his arm and later allying with the Bones briefly before returning to their own side. They address each other as "comrade". Fone Bone is the one who dubs the two "Stupid, Stupid Rat Creatures", most commonly when they are hanging off the side of a cliff. Occasionally other characters also refer to them as such. Fone Bone is also usually credited with coining the term "Rat Creatures" itself; however, he actually got the name from the possum kids. In Rat Creature tradition only royalty are allowed to have names, but in the spin-off novel series Quest for the Spark two young Bones gave them the names "Stinky" and "Smelly".
As it stands, the proper name of their species appears to be Hairy Men. Named after some incidents where one, or both, clearly emphasize their title, they in turn call Fone Bone "Small Mammal". In a running gag throughout the series, the brown rat creature often suggests cooking Fone Bone in a quiche. The other rat creature then flies into a rage, insisting that 'dainty pastry foods' are 'unfit for monsters', and that they should eat him in a stew—though he did once in a fit of anger declare an intention of eating Fone Bone raw, and on another occasion, when they were starving, told his comrade that he would not mind some of his home-made quiche. Later, Fone Bone himself delivered to the two some 'piping hot quiche' when he found them shivering in a bush after the Hooded One's defeat. They also have a major role in Quest for the Spark. The characters are also depicted as having a bad relationship with Kingdok, as he almost always berates them, often for unnecessary reasons.

=== Other characters ===
Bartleby
A purplish baby rat creature found by Fone Bone and adopted as a pet by Smiley Bone (who also gave him his name). After the Bones' first encounter with Roque Ja, Bartleby returns to the fold of the Rat Creatures, though is out of place there and returns to the Bones later after growing a little. He became a good friend to Smiley and when they left for Boneville, he went with them. Bartleby was named by Shaenon K. Garrity, for the title character in the short story "Bartleby, the Scrivener" by Herman Melville. Unlike the other Rat Creatures, Bartleby has round ears. He explains that the Rat Creatures are supposed to get their ears cropped and that he ran away before they could do that to him. Bartleby also explains that the first time he ran away from the Rat Creatures was after he got his tail chopped off. He states that all Rat Creatures are born with beautiful, long, hairless tails, but all the Rat Creature cubs have their tails chopped off around the time they turn one year old. This is due to their belief that a sort of boogie man named 'The Jekk' will drag them away in their sleep by their tails. In the prequel book Stupid, Stupid, Rat-Tails, we learn that the Bone cousins' forefather 'Big Johnson Bone' is the fabled boogie man they fear, having come to the Valley hundreds of years earlier and fighting the Rat Creatures by swinging them around by their tails. In a sequence depicting the land during the Dragons' rule, Rat Creatures with long tails can be seen in the distance.

Roque Ja (Rock Jaw)
A huge mountain lion and an adversary to Kingdok who views himself as neutral in the conflict between the humans and the Lord of the Locusts despite lopsided affiliations. He is the guardian of the Eastern Border. His personal views are that there is no such thing as "good" and "evil", only that power matters above all and that friendship and love are meaningless. He despises both Dragons and Rat Creatures but works for the Hooded One in exchange for land and spoils of war. His name is mispronounced as 'Rock Jaw' by the Bone cousins. His size also varies in the books, sometimes being smaller than Kingdok, but sometimes being large enough to fill a huge gap in the mountain side.

Roderick and the Orphans
Roderick is a young raccoon whose parents were killed and eaten by the two stupid rat creatures. He is the leader of a large group of orphaned animal children living in the mountains. Roderick is the only one named, and the complete group consists of a beaver, a boar, a second raccoon, two birds, a rabbit, a porcupine, a turtle, two snakes, a squirrel, and a chipmunk. Roderick the Raccoon is a main character in the Quest for the Spark, though he is now older and friends with Tom Elm, another main character in the trilogy.

King Agak
The new Rat Creature king in Quest for the Spark, who replaces Kingdok following the latter's death. Like Kingdok, he hates the two Stupid Rat Creatures. After the duo steal a dead squirrel from him, he becomes obsessed with revenge. Agak and his army are starving, and are convinced that they can cure their hunger by eating the Bones.

The Lord of the Locusts
The unseen dark lord who serves as the source of all conflict in the series. He is an evil, formless "nightmare" trapped inside a mountain, and appears in the form of a locust swarm to his henchmen and followers. He is powerless on his own, and relies on possessing others in order to accomplish his goals. He is even capable of reviving the dead, seen primarily with Briar. He is killed when Fone Bone and Thorn, bearing a piece of the Locust themselves in their souls, touched the Crown of Horns. He normally appears either as a formless mass, a bright light, a pair of eyes, a massive locust, or a swarm of locusts in a basic shape.

Mim
The benevolent queen of the dragons, considered to be the creator of the valley. She kept the world in balance by putting her tail into her mouth so that her body forms a circle, and perpetually spinning, until she was possessed by the Lord of the Locusts, turning her irrational and violent. The other dragons were forced to turn her to stone to seal the Lord of the Locusts. Her awakening was said to be the end of the world, but when the Lord of the Locusts was destroyed, an aged Mim returned to her function followed by all of the other Dragons besides the Great Red Dragon.

The Veni Yan ("stick-eaters")
A mysterious clan of hooded warriors, who respect dragons as the supreme rulers of the land. Distrusted by the townsfolk (who came up with the derogatory term "stick-eater") but trusted by Lucius, though often they do not trust him in return. They are loyal to the royal family even after Grandma Ben and Thorn went into exile and immediately recognizes Rose's authority upon her return to the capital. For much of the series, they serve as a channel of communication between the capital, Lucius, Grandma Ben, and Thorn.

Headmaster
The leader of the Venu and most powerful soldier. He is distinguished with a fur vest with bronze tokens. In the series, two appear. The first is the current one who has a feeling that the world is ending. The second one is retired in the city of Atheia and is the headmaster that appears in "Rose".

Tarsil
The ruthless leader of the Vedu. He is missing an arm and has a large scar down the length of his face, injuries he claims to have obtained while fighting dragons. He wears a large earring on one ear, and his beard in two separate parts each wrapped in a piece of cloth. He does not respect the monarchy of Aethia claiming that the throne is dead, even when Rose and Thorn return. He is killed by Briar in front of his own people, effectively ending his rule.

The Vedu
A separatist group of Veni Yan who are led by Tarsil. Although they wear similar hoods to the Veni Yan they are distinguishable by the eye on their hoods. The Vedu do not worship, or even respect, dragons, claiming that they have all gone into hiding or are uncaring enough to ignore their people. They have kept order in Atheia for much of the time that Rose and Thorn were in exile, and claim that things are better that way. However, some people disagree and continue to set out dragon shrines, which are forcibly removed by the Vedu.

== Reception ==
=== Critical praise ===
Bone had only six issues published when it was selected for "Palmer's Picks" by Tom Palmer Jr., who commented that "Smith's artwork is deceptively simple. He doesn't use much flash, yet he is a master of conveying gesture and body language for both humorous and dramatic effect". He also noted that "the series has only recently begun, yet it has been met with enormous amounts of critical praise from people ranging from Will Eisner to Peter David". Michael Arner from PopMatters.com was initially not impressed with the black and white artwork, and at first disappointed at the ending, hoping for a more conclusive dénouement. However, he ultimately praised the depth of the characterizations and Smith's ability to mix humor and adventure as perfect.

Bob's Comics Review described the work as "Tolkienesque" in its compulsive progression from a simple comic tale to a sprawling epic. Although critical of the earlier issues, the writer came to enjoy the range of writing "from slapstick (the cow race is a classic), to the scary yet hilarious rat creatures, to intimations of high fantasy". Smith's sense of timing was praised as well as the creator's use of the silent panel and "repeated scene with variations of movement or perspective". In 2004, Time critic Andrew Arnold called Bone "the best all-ages graphic novel yet published". In 2011, IGN ranked Bone 60th in the Top 100 comic book heroes.

=== Book ban controversy ===
In 2010, a Minnesota parent sought to have Bone banned from all elementary school libraries in the Rosemount-Apple Valley-Eagan School District, citing references in the work to smoking, drinking, and gambling. After a hearing, a school district committee voted 10 to 1 to keep the books on the shelves. Other challenges and controversies that cite racism and political viewpoint as main problems have led to Bone's placement on the 2013 ALA Banned Books List.

=== Awards ===
Bone has received numerous awards and nominations, among them ten Eisner Awards and eleven Harvey Awards.

- 1993 Russ Manning Award for Most Promising Newcomer
- 1993 Eisner Award for Best Humor Publication
- 1994 Eisner Award for Best Serialized Story: "The Great Cow Race"; Bone #7–11
- 1994 Eisner Award for Best Continuing Series
- 1994 Eisner Award for Best Writer/Artist: Jeff Smith
- 1994 Eisner Award for Best Humor Publication
- 1995 Eisner Award for Best Humor Publication
- 1995 Eisner Award for Best Writer/Artist: Humor: Jeff Smith
- 1995 Eisner Award for Best Continuing Series
- 1998 Eisner Award for Best Writer/Artist: Humor: Jeff Smith
- 2005 Eisner Award for Best Graphic Album: Reprint: Bone One Volume Edition
- 1994 Harvey Award for Best Cartoonist (Writer/Artist): Jeff Smith
- 1994 Harvey Award Special Award for Humor: Jeff Smith
- 1994 Harvey Award for Best Graphic Album of Previously Published Work: The Complete Bone Adventures; reissued in color as Bone: Out from Boneville (Scholastic Corporation)
- 1995 Harvey Award for Best Cartoonist (Writer/Artist): Jeff Smith
- 1996 Harvey Award for Best Cartoonist (Writer/Artist): Jeff Smith
- 1996: Alph-Art for Best Foreign Album at the Angoulême International Comics Festival for La Forêt sans retour, the first French volume of Bone.
- 1997 Harvey Award for Best Cartoonist (Writer/Artist): Jeff Smith
- 1999 Harvey Award for Best Cartoonist (Writer/Artist): Jeff Smith, for his body of work in 1998, including Bone
- 2000 Harvey Award for Best Cartoonist (Writer/Artist): Jeff Smith
- 2003 Harvey Award for Best Cartoonist (Writer/Artist): Jeff Smith
- 2005 Harvey Award for Best Cartoonist (Writer/Artist): Jeff Smith
- 2005 Harvey Award for Best Graphic Album of Previously Published Work: Bone: One Volume Edition

Nominations

- 1993 Eisner Award for Best Writer/Artist: Jeff Smith
- 1995 Eisner Award for Best Single Issue: Bone #16: "Eyes of the Storm"
- 1995 Eisner Award for Best Comics-Related Item: Bone figurine, sculpted by Jeff Smith and Randy Bowen
- 1996 Eisner Award for Best Title for Younger Readers
- 1998 Eisner Award for Best Continuing Series
- 1998 Eisner Award for Best Comics-Related Product: Bone Red Dragon cold-cast statue, sculpted by Randy Bowen, based on designs by Jeff Smith
- 1998 Eisner Award for Best Comics Publication for a Younger Audience
- 1999 Eisner Award for Best Comics-Related Product/Item: Phoney Bone inflatable
- 2003 Eisner Award for Best Graphic Album Reprint: Bone vol. 8: Treasure Hunters
- 2004 Eisner Award for Best Writer/Artist: Humor: Jeff Smith
- 2005 Eisner Award for Best Comics Publication for a Younger Audience
- 2006 Eisner Award for Best Coloring: Steve Hamaker, Bone: The Great Cow Race
- 2008 Eisner Award for Best Coloring: Steve Hamaker, Bone (vols. 5 and 6) and Shazam: Monster Society of Evil

== Other media ==
=== Canceled films and animated series ===
Numerous attempts have been made to adapt the books, all of which have failed to come to fruition. In the late 1990s, an attempt was made by Nickelodeon Movies to produce a film adaptation of Bone. Jeff Smith said in a 2003 interview that Nickelodeon wanted the Bone cousins to be voiced by child actors, and wanted the film's soundtrack to include pop songs by the likes of NSYNC and Britney Spears; Smith was critical of this proposal.

In March 2008, Warner Bros. Pictures bought the film rights to the series. Smith's website confirmed on March 13 that he had made a deal with Warner Bros. to adapt the Bone saga into a film series. Further information was given in July 2011, citing that "two scripts have already been written and rejected—a third is currently in the works and will most likely yield three separate, computer-animated, 3-D films". In January 2012, Patrick Sean Smith, the creator of TV series Greek, was hired to write an adaptation, and that P. J. Hogan was attached to direct the feature, to be produced by Lin Pictures and Animal Logic. In November 2016, Mark Osborne had been hired to direct the animated adaptation for Warner Animation Group. Osborne, along with Adam Kline, were set to write the film, which would have been the first in a planned trilogy.

In October 2019, the project was picked up by Netflix for an animated series after Warner's turnaround of the project. However, in April 2022, production on the series was canceled during a reorganization of Netflix Animation; following this, many animation studios contacted Smith to express "immediate interest" in the project. In response to the cancellation, Smith released a Bone comic strip parodying the recurring Peanuts gag of Lucy pulling away a football as Charlie Brown is about to kick it. The comic, featuring Phoney Bone and Fone Bone in place of Lucy and Charlie Brown respectively, poked fun at the repeated cancellation of an animated Bone project. As of February 2023, Netflix retains the rights to the series.

=== Action figures ===
In 1996, the toy manufacturer Resaurus released Series One of a Bone action figure line, featuring: Fone Bone with Rat Cub, Thorn, Smiley Bone, and Rat Creature. Five years later, a second line was released with Gran'ma Ben, Phoney Bone, The Hooded One, and a deluxe boxed set of Kingdok. Two exclusive figures were released through the toy and comic magazine Previews: Hooded One (glow in the dark), and Phoney Bone as Ahab. Most recently, in 2007, "Dark Horse Comics Presents" released a 5-inch-high (130 mm) statue of Fone Bone, which is limited to 750 pieces and to be sold through Wizard magazine.

=== Video games ===
In 2005, video game studio Telltale Games developed an episodic adventure game series based on the comic. While five episodes were planned, only two were ultimately released. The first episode, Bone: Out from Boneville, was released on September 15, 2005, and the second, The Great Cow Race, on April 12, 2006. Both were available in downloaded or boxed form on Telltale's website for Windows-based PCs. The games were also available via Steam, but were delisted following Telltale's closure.

== See also ==
- Indie comics
