= The Dragonslayer =

Book by Jeff Smith

- First US edition cover
- Author: Jeff Smith
- Illustrator: Jeff Smith
- Cover artist: Jeff Smith; David Reed (colourist); Elizabeth Lewis; Drew
- Language: English
- Series: Bone
- Genre: Fantasy, comedy
- Publisher: Cartoon Books
- Publication date: 1997
- Publication place: U.S.
- Media type: Hardback and paperback
- Pages: 176
- ISBN: 1-888963-01-8 (hardback); ISBN 1-888963-00-X (paperback)
- OCLC: 38290218
- Preceded by: Eyes of the Storm
- Followed by: Rock Jaw: Master of the Eastern Border

The Dragonslayer is the fourth book in the Bone series. It collects issues 20-27 of Jeff Smith's Bone comics. This volume marks the beginning of the second part of the Bone saga, entitled Solstice. The book was first published by Cartoon Books in its original black-and-white form in 1997. Paperback and hardback coloured editions were published in 2006 by Scholastic.

This volume follows the deepening hostilities in between the inhabitants of the valley and the Rat Creatures and their allies. Further secrets from Thorn's past are revealed, and Phoney Bone appoints himself the town dragon slayer. This one has a much darker character than the previous books, evidenced in part by moments such as the one in which Thorn cuts off Kingdok's arm.

== Synopsis ==
=== Business ===
Following the message that a Rat Creature army is crossing the Eastern border, Fone Bone, Thorn, and Gran'ma Ben travel off-road to Barrelhaven. En route, Gran'ma Ben suffers an attack of her "gitchy feeling" - a dizziness and her omen of impending trouble. At the Barrelhaven tavern itself, Phoney Bone's tales of dangerous dragons make his end of the bar the most popular. Lucius attempts to call off the bet, but Phoney declines.

=== Earth & Sky ===
After fending off their ambush, Gran'ma Ben captures one of the Two Stupid Rat Creatures and learns from him that the Rat Creatures are under orders to evacuate the valley. Kingdok attacks the party; but Thorn slices off Kingdok's right arm, whereupon Kingdok, in a haze of pain, identifies Ben and Thorn as the queen and crown princess of old, and retreats. Smiley Bone, hearing Fone Bone's cries of distress, rushes out with the townsfolk to look for him, but they only find the scene of the fight.

=== Council in the Dark ===
The two Rat Creatures find the senseless Kingdok and blame themselves for his wound. As Thorn dresses Gran'ma Ben's wounds, Ben reveals to Thorn that she is a Veni-Yan Cari: an individual empowered by innate control of "The Dreaming" (the subconscious mental existence of intelligent creatures), and therefore desired by the Hooded One. Angered that her past has been concealed from her, Thorn leaves for the Barrelhaven alone. Fone Bone makes to follow her, and Gran'ma Ben gives him her sword and a pendant bearing the royal crest, with instructions to show it to Lucius. The minute Fone Bone leaves, she runs into the woods. When Thorn and Fone Bone arrive at Barrelhaven, Phoney Bone has taken control of the town and barricaded the roads.

=== The Straggler ===
The Hooded One brings news to the Lord of the Locusts that the armies of Pawa in the South have joined their cause, and the kingdom of Atheia has fallen to them. At Barrelhaven, Phoney Bone has stockpiled many of the townspeople's goods in payment for his "protection". Late one night, Fone Bone finds a baby rat creature scrounging in the garbage. Staying at the inn that night, Thorn is once again visited by the Hooded One in her dreams; this time revealing its face like young Gran'ma Ben's. She is only saved when Fone Bone wakes her to tell her about the Rat Creature cub and presents it to her. Thorn becomes furious at the sight, remembering how her parents were killed by Kingdok and threatens to kill it if Fone Bone doesn't kick it out.

=== Deliver Us These Laws ===
Lucius Down, after searching for Gran'ma Ben for two days, returns to find the town barricaded, and orders the fences to be torn down; but the townsfolk, terrified of dragons, refuse him. In the barn, Smiley Bone adopts the Rat Creature cub as a pet. Fone Bone meets with Lucius, who fears that the Rat Creatures evacuating the valley could be a precursor to another sneak attack like the Nights of Lightning. Smiley is shocked to learn that Thorn is a princess. Meanwhile, the Hooded One addresses the Rat Creatures and men from Pawa and orders them to prepare for war.

=== The Midsummer Day's Plan ===
Phoney continues to press the townspeople for his “dragon slayer” fees. Meanwhile, Thorn decides to leave the town and return to the farmhouse. In the mountains enclosing the valley, the Rat Creature army and the Pawan's have massed under the instructions of the Hooded One, in preparation for an invasion.

=== The Turning ===
Fone Bone and Smiley sneak the Rat Creature cub out of the walled compound to release it, but when Smiley strays out of sight with the cub, Fone is forced to go after them. Thorn tries to return to the farmhouse, but she collapses with exhaustion on the way, where four Veni Yan monks return her sword, which she left at the Barrelhaven. In her dream, she meets the Great Red Dragon, who convinces her not to run away. The next morning, Phoney Bone rallies the townsfolk to carry him and his fees into the mountains where he tells them, he will capture and kill a dragon.

=== On the Dragon's Stair ===
Phoney and the townspeople reach the Dragon's Stair, a pass high in the mountains, where Phoney arranges a dragon trap; a ruse as part of his plan to make off for Boneville with his new wealth, but the plan becomes complicated when the Great Red Dragon deliberately walks into the trap, at the behest of Ted. The townspeople urge Phoney to kill the dragon, but just as he is about to reluctantly do so, Thorn stops him, and shows the townsfolk smoke from the Rat Creature army advancing toward Barrelhaven. A pack of Rat Creatures encounters the party. Thorn, with the four Veni Yan monks alongside her, drive the Rat Creatures back, and Phoney uses Thorn's sword to free the dragon. The dragon and Veni Yan monks chase the Rat Creatures away, and Thorn instructs the townsfolk to arm themselves, as they finally realize they are at war with the Rat Creatures.
