= The Great Cow Race =

1996 book by Jeff Smith

- First US edition cover
- Author: Jeff Smith
- Illustrator: Jeff Smith
- Cover artist: Jeff Smith; David Reed (colourist)
- Language: English
- Series: Bone
- Genre: Fantasy, comedy
- Publisher: Cartoon Books
- Publication date: 1996
- Publication place: U.S.
- Media type: Hardback and paperback
- Pages: 132
- ISBN: 0-9636609-8-5 (hardback); ISBN 0-9636609-5-0 (paperback)
- OCLC: 35142035
- Dewey Decimal: 741.5/973 20
- LC Class: PN6727.S546 B66 1995
- Preceded by: Out from Boneville
- Followed by: Eyes of the Storm

The Great Cow Race is the second book in the Bone series. It collects issues 7-11 of Jeff Smith's self-published Bone graphic novels, along with the short story "Up on the Roof" which was originally published in Wizard Presents: Bone 13½. The book was first published by Cartoon Books in its original black-and-white form in 1996. Paperback and hardback coloured editions were released in 2005 by Scholastic.

This volume focuses on Gran'ma Ben's annual race against the town's cows, and Phoney and Smiley Bone's attempts to fix the race. It also delves into the deepening mystery of Thorn's past, and the brooding unrest between the valley folk and the Rat Creature tribe, between whom there has been an uneasy treaty.

== Chapters ==
=== The Spring Fair ===
Thorn, Gran'ma Ben, and the Bone cousins attend the spring fair: an annual market and festival that culminates in the Great Cow Race, which Gran'ma Ben always wins. Fone Bone is driven to jealousy when Tom, a handsome honey seller, flirts with Thorn. Phoney and Smiley Bone continue their work at the Barrelhaven Tavern, with Phoney sowing seeds of disquiet about Gran'ma Ben's fitness to compete in order to cheat the residents of their goods.

=== The Cave ===
Phoney Bone arranges bets placed on his "Mystery Cow" (Smiley in disguise), intending that the latter purposely lose to justify Phoney's seizure of livestock placed at stake; whereas Thorn has a vivid dream of herself as a young child surrounded by dragons. She tells Fone Bone the dream is recurrent, and stimulated by her seeing his map, and records a childhood memory.

=== The Mystery Cow ===
When Lucius Down convinces the townsfolk the Bones are deceiving them, Phoney and Smiley stage a charade to convince people that the Mystery Cow is indeed real. Fone Bone's attempt to write a love poem to Thorn is interrupted by the Two Stupid Rat Creatures (introduced in the initial book).

=== The Great Cow Race ===
At the beginning of the race, Lucius bets his tavern on Gran'ma Ben, against the other bets placed on Smiley; and Phoney, in panic, joins Smiley in his cow costume, in hope of thus winning the race. When Gran'ma Ben tries to unmask the duo, they arouse a Rat Creature patrol, and the Two Stupid Rat Creatures pursue Fone Bone through the same encampment. This converts the race into a stampede of cows, Rat Creatures, and Bones; but Gran'ma Ben wins the race.

=== Lonesome Road ===
After the race, Phoney and Smiley are forced to work off their debts washing dishes at the Barrelhaven Tavern and repairing Gran'ma Ben's farm. Lucius and Ben discuss the situation, and conclude that the Bones are not to blame.

=== Up on the Roof ===
A vignette centering on Smiley Bone and Lucius Down as they fix the roof of the farm house, wherein Lucius becomes frustrated by Smiley's clumsiness, and Smiley reflects that his "village idiot" role has not changed since leaving Boneville.

== Video game ==
A video game adaptation of The Great Cow Race, Bone: The Great Cow Race, developed by Telltale Games, is available for the PC, and is a follow-up to their earlier Bone: Out from Boneville title.
