= Rock Jaw: Master of the Eastern Border =

1998 book by Jeff Smith

- First US edition cover
- Author: Jeff Smith
- Illustrator: Jeff Smith
- Cover artist: Jeff Smith; Elizabeth Lewis
- Language: English
- Series: Bone
- Genre: Fantasy, comedy
- Publisher: Cartoon Books
- Publication date: September 1, 1998
- Publication place: United States
- Media type: Hardback and paperback
- Pages: 128
- ISBN: 1-888963-02-6 (hardback); ISBN 1-888963-03-4 (paperback)
- OCLC: 41882709
- Preceded by: The Dragonslayer
- Followed by: Old Man's Cave

Rock Jaw: Master of the Eastern Border is the fifth book in the Bone series. It collects issues 28-32 of Jeff Smith's self-published Bone comic book series. The book was published by Cartoon Books in its original black-and-white form in 1998. Paperback and hardback coloured editions were published in February 2007 by Scholastic.

This book focuses on the journey of Fone Bone and Smiley Bone. They travel to the mountains to return a baby Rat Creature back to his own kind. On the way, they are interrupted by Roque Ja (whose name the Bones mispronounce as "Rock Jaw"), a giant and enigmatic mountain lion. They spend the rest of their journey teamed up with a band of orphans to escape Rock Jaw. On this adventure Fone Bone and Smiley Bone also have to escape Kingdok. Notably, it is the only book in the series to not feature the characters of Phoney Bone, Thorn Harvestar, Gran’ma Ben, and Lucius Down.

== Synopsis ==
=== Roque Ja ===
Fone Bone and Smiley enter the Eastern Mountains to set free the baby Rat Creature, whom Smiley names Bartleby, and accidentally encounter the two Stupid Rat Creatures. Escaping these, they encounter the eponymous giant mountain lion 'Rock Jaw', who explains the Hooded One fears "the one who bears the star" (Phoney Bone), whom it suspects of plotting against it.

=== The Orphans ===
Rock Jaw escorts Smiley and Fone higher into the mountains, followed by the opossum children who befriended the Bones in the initial volume. Knowing that Rock Jaw hates interlopers in his territory, the "possum kids" and their raccoon friend Roderick lure the two stupid Rat Creatures to distract Rock Jaw; but Roderick refuses to leave without his friends of other species, and Rock Jaw rejoins them.

=== Rat Creature Temple ===
The Bones and small animals escape into a tunnel in the mountainside, and emerge beside a deserted temple built apparently by Rat Creatures, where they speculate (after a story related by Roque Ja and other characters) that the valley was created by a war among dragons, and that the same war imprisoned the 'Lord of the Locusts', the story's antagonist. As the Bones continue towards the valley, they encounter the two stupid Rat Creatures; but all are pursued onto a ledge by the Rat Creatures' chief, Kingdok.

=== Ghost Circles ===
Trapped by Kingdok, the Bones and the Rat Creatures continue along a precarious cliff, and are later attacked by a swarm of locusts, whereupon Fone Bone falls onto a lower ledge and the locusts try to carry him away; but a medallion given by Gran'ma Ben scares the locusts away. As the locusts flee, Kingdok vanishes, having been an illusion generated by the locusts' magic.

=== Call of the Wild ===
The Rat Creatures, the Bones and their friends descend from the mountains, unaware that they are eavesdropped upon by Roque Ja. As they descend, the Rat Creatures reveal that the current unrest has only come about since the Hooded One arrived, bringing the locusts and strange dreams. At that moment, Roque Ja orders them back up the mountain. Before they can go far, the real Kingdok fights with Roque Ja, and the Bones escape (the two stupid rat creatures). Roderick, the possum kids, and the other orphans leave; the 'two stupids' and Bartleby rejoin the other Rat Creatures; the Rat Creatures carry the unconscious Kingdok away; and Fone Bone and Smiley Bone return to the valley.
