= Stan Sakai =

Japanese-American cartoonist and comic book creator

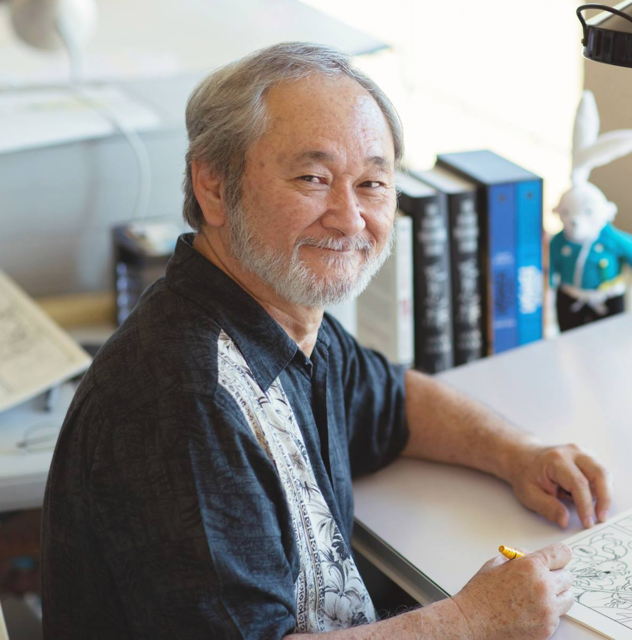
- Stan Sakai in his studio, 2015
- Born: Masahiko Sakai (坂井 雅彦); May 25, 1953 (age 73) Kyoto, Japan
- Areas: Artist, writer, and letterer.
- Notable works: Usagi Yojimbo

Stan Masahiko Sakai (坂井雅彦, Sakai Masahiko; born May 25, 1953) is a Japanese-born American cartoonist and comic book creator. He is best known as the creator of the comic series Usagi Yojimbo.

== Early life ==
Sakai was born Masahiko Sakai (坂井雅彦) in Kyoto, Japan, to Akio and Teruko Sakai. His father was a second-generation Japanese American from Hawaii, who was stationed in Japan with the U.S. occupation forces. Sakai and his family moved back to Hawaii when he was two years old, and Sakai was raised in the Kaimuki neighborhood of Honolulu. He studied Fine Arts (disciplines) at the University of Hawaii before continuing his training at the ArtCenter College of Design in Pasadena, California.

== Career ==
He began his career by lettering comic books (notably Groo the Wanderer by Sergio Aragonés and Mark Evanier) and wrote and illustrated The Adventures of Nilson Groundthumper and Hermy; a comic series with a medieval setting, influenced by Groo the Wanderer. The characters first appeared in Albedo Anthropomorphics #2 in 1984, and they were subsequently featured in issues of Critters, Grimjack, Amazing Heroes and Furrlough.

Sakai became famous with the creation of Usagi Yojimbo, the epic saga of Miyamoto Usagi, a samurai rabbit living in late-sixteenth and early-seventeenth-century Japan. First published in 1984, the comic continues to this day, with Sakai as the lone author and nearly sole artist (Tom Luth serves as the main colorist on the series, and Sergio Aragonés has made two small contributions to the series: the story "Broken Ritual" (Usagi Yojimbo vol. 1, issue 33, published by Fantagraphics) is based on an idea by Aragonés, and he served as a guest inker for the black-and-white version of the story "Return to Adachi Plain", from Usagi Yojimbo vol. 3, issue 10, published by Dark Horse, and reprinted in the collection Seasons.). Sakai also created a futuristic spinoff series Space Usagi. His favorite movie is Satomi Hakkenden (1959). The Japanese American National Museum in Los Angeles's Little Tokyo presented an exhibit entitled "Year of the Rabbit: Stan Sakai's Usagi Yojimbo" from July 9 through October 30, 2011.

Sakai wrote and illustrated the story "I'm Not in Springfield Anymore!" for Bart Simpson's Treehouse of Horror #7 and illustrated the back cover of Treehouse of Horror #6.

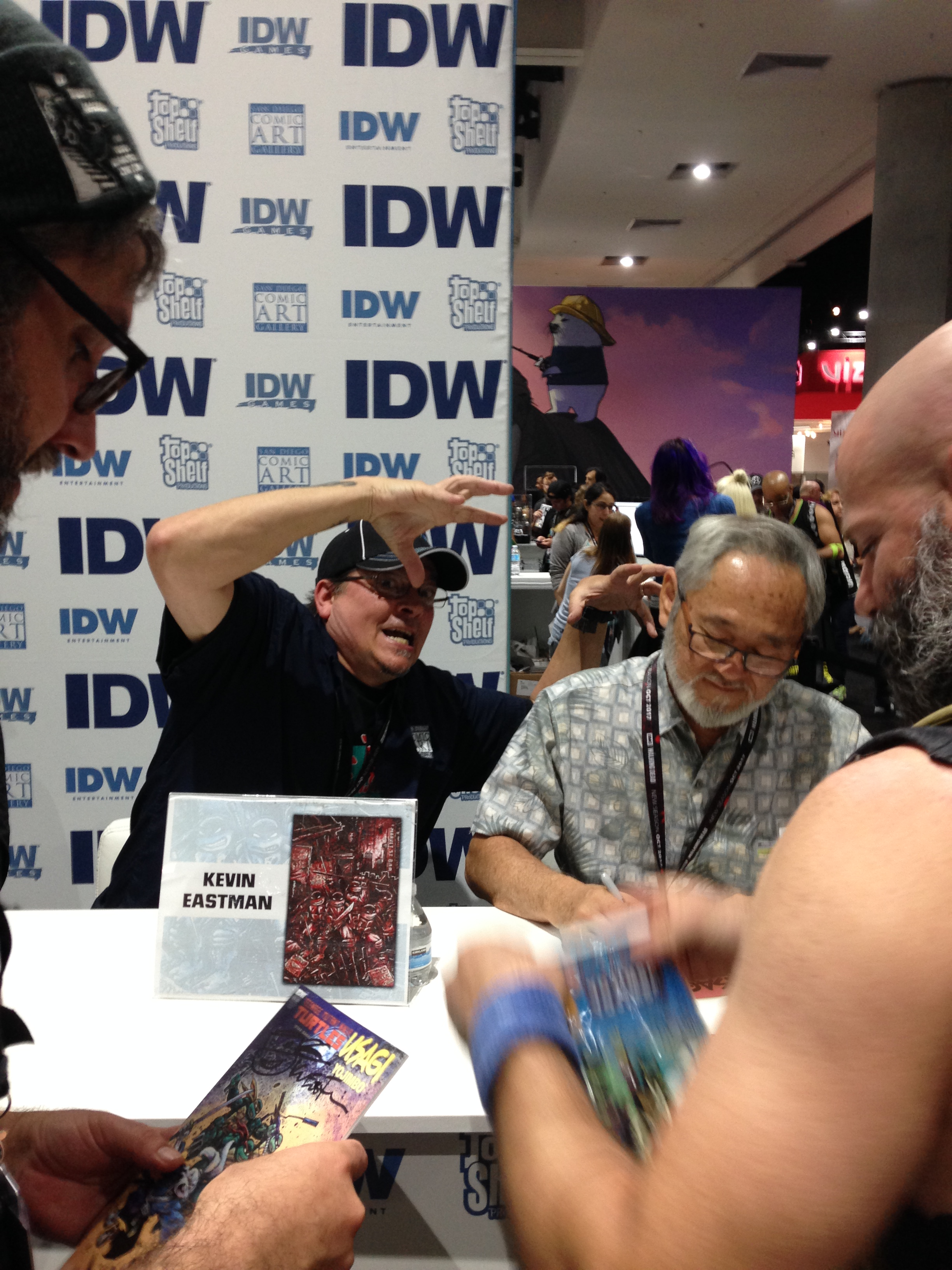
Stan Sakai with Kevin Eastman (Co-creator of TMNT) at San Diego Comic-Con in 2017

Sakai was the artist for Riblet, the back-up feature in the Bone spinoff miniseries and trade paperback, Stupid, Stupid Rat Tails.

In 2013, Sakai illustrated the limited comic book series 47 Ronin, an adaptation of the famed story of the 47 Ronin written by Dark Horse Comics Publisher Mike Richardson and with Lone Wolf and Cub writer Kazuo Koike as an editorial consultant.

The seventh episode of the 2012 Teenage Mutant Ninja Turtles animated series' fifth season, "Yojimbo", was written by Sakai and features Miyamoto Usagi, who has appeared in a few TMNT shows to date.

In 2020, it was announced that Sakai would serve as an executive producer on the then-upcoming Netflix original animated series Samurai Rabbit: The Usagi Chronicles, which is based on Usagi Yojimbo.

In April 2022, Sakai was reported among the more than three dozen comics creators who contributed to Operation USA's benefit anthology book, Comics for Ukraine: Sunflower Seeds, a project spearheaded by IDW Publishing Special Projects Editor Scott Dunbier, whose profits would be donated to relief efforts for Ukrainian refugees resulting from the February 2022 Russian invasion of Ukraine. Sakai's contribution is an original Usagi Yojimbo story in which the main character comes to the aid of refugees fleeing the invasion of their land by a warlord, themes that speak to the events in Ukraine.

In July 2025, during that year's San Diego Comic-Con, collectible company Thrilljoy collaborated with Sakai under their PIX! line in order to create an artist series figure of their mascot, Bloo. It released on their website as a pre-order during the convention and was only available for 48 hours. The company later released a figure of Usagi Yojimbo and a cherry blossom variation of the Sakai Bloo.

== Awards ==
- 1990 Parents' Choice Award for "Skillful weaving of facts and legends into his work"
- 1991 Inkpot Award from San Diego Comic-Con for "Lifetime Achievement in the Field of Cartooning"
- 1996 Eisner Award for "Best Letterer" (Groo and Usagi Yojimbo)
- 1996 Eisner Award for "Talent Deserving of Wider Recognition" (Usagi Yojimbo)
- 1999 Eisner Award for "Best Serialized Story" (Usagi Yojimbo "Grasscutter")
- 1999 Haxtur Award for "Best Short Story [in Spain]" (Usagi Yojimbo "Noodles" [Spanish Edition])
- 2000 Haxtur Award for "Best Script [in Spain]" (Usagi Yojimbo's "Grasscutter" [Spanish Edition])
- 2001 Ursa Major Award for "Best Anthropomorphic Comic Book or Strip"
- 2002 National Cartoonists Society Comic Book Division Awards (Usagi Yojimbo)
- 2002 Ursa Major Award for "Best Anthropomorphic Comic Book or Strip"
- 2003 Ursa Major Award for "Best Anthropomorphic Comic Book"
- 2003 La Plumilla de Plata (Silver Inkpen Award) in Mexico for his lifetime achievements and contributions to comic books.
- 2004 Ursa Major Award for "Best Anthropomorphic Other Literary Work" (The Art of Usagi Yojimbo) and "Best Anthropomorphic Comic Book" (Usagi Yojimbo)
- 2005 Ursa Major Award for "Best Anthropomorphic Comic Book" (Usagi Yojimbo)
- 2007 Harvey Award for "Best Letterer"
- 2011 Cultural Ambassador Award
- 2012 Eisner Award for "Best Lettering" (Usagi Yojimbo)
- 2014 Inkwell Award for The All-in-One Award (47 Ronin, DHP, and Mouse Guard)
- 2015 Eisner Award for "Best Lettering" (Usagi Yojimbo)
- 2016 Harvey Award for "Best Cartoonist" (Usagi Yojimbo)
- 2018 Eisner Award for "Best Lettering" (Usagi Yojimbo)
- 2020 Eisner Award for "Best Archival Collection/Project" (Usagi Yojimbo)
- 2020 Eisner Award for "Best Lettering"
- 2020 Ringo Award for "Best Cartoonist" (Usagi Yojimbo)
- 2020 Ringo Award for "Best Presentation" (Grasscutter Artist Select)
- 2020 Ringo Award for "Best Single Issue or Story" (Usagi Yojimbo #6)

From 1993 through 2005, Stan Sakai has received twenty-one Eisner Award nominations. He has also been nominated for the Comics Buyer's Guide Award for Favorite Writer in 1999 and 2000. In 2020, Sakai was inducted into the Eisner Award Hall of Fame.

== Bibliography ==
=== Other works ===
- 47 Ronin (2014, Dark Horse) – collects #1–5, story by Mike Richardson, colors by Lovern Kindzierski, and letters by L. Lois Buhalis and Tom Orzechowski
- Deadpool: Black, White & Blood #3 - back-up story
- Flash Gordon Adventures: Carrot of DOOM! (2025, Papercutz) - back-up story from Flash Gordon Adventures! Volume Two
- More Stupid Tales (2024, Cartoon Books) - collects Riblet, previously included as a back-up strip across 1997 and 1998 issues of Jeff Smith's Bone.
- Rocketeer Adventures: A Dream Of Flying (2012, IDW) - back-up story from Rocketeer Adventures (vol 2) #1
- Strange Tales #3 (2009, Marvel) - back-up story featuring the Hulk
- The Adventures of Nilson Groundthumper and Hermy (2014, Dark Horse) – collect stories from Albedo Anthropomorphics #1 and #5; Critters Special #1; Critters #5, 16, and 27; Usagi Yojimbo (vol. 1) #19; Usagi Yojimbo Color Special #1–3; Usagi Yojimbo (vol. 2) #9; and Dark Horse Presents (vol. 2) #30; colors by Ryan Hill and Tom Luth
- Fantastic Four (2025) #11 - back-up story [released May 2026]

=== Variant Covers ===
Sakai has produced a number of covers for comic strips he did not write or illustrate. These are often variant covers, meaning they are not the main cover and often have a lower print run.

1989

- The Adolescent Radioactive Black Belt Hamsters Massacre The Japanese Invasion One-Shot - main cover

1994

- Ninja High School Yearbook #6 - main cover

1996

- The Comics Journal #192 - magazine, main cover, featuring Usagi Yojimbo

1997

- Furrlough #50 - main cover

2000

- In The Zone One-Shot - main cover, featuring Usagi Yojimbo

2009

- Strange Tales #3 - main cover, also interior story

2014

- Rocket Racoon #2
- The Witcher #1

2015

- Star Wars #1

2016

- Betty & Veronica #1
- Kong of Skull Island #2

2017

- Jim Henson's Storyteller: Fairies #1

2018

- Garfield: Homecoming #1

2019

- Radically Rearranged Ronin Ragdolls One-Shot - featuring Usagi Yojimbo
- Ragnarok: Breaking Of Hellheim #1
- Star Wars Adventures: Annual 2019

2021

- Deadpool: Black, White & Blood #3 - also interior story
- Demon Days: Mariko #1
- King Conan #1
- Venom #1

2022

- Marvel Voices: Identity #1
- Moon Knight: Black, White & Blood #1
- Predator #4
- Shaolin Cowboy: Cruel To Be Kin #3
- Sonic The Hedgehog: Tails' 30th Anniversary Special One-Shot
- TMNT: The Last Ronin #5
- X Lives of Wolverine #4

2024

- Cult of the Lamb #1 - with Julie Sakai
- Hellverine #3
- Kid Venom #2
- Mighty Morphin' Power Rangers / Power Rangers One-Shot - featuring Usagi Yojimbo
- Star Wars Visions: Peach Momoko One-Shot
- Star Wars Visions: The Ronin & The Droid One-Shot
- TMNT: The Last Ronin II #1
- TMNT / Usagi Yojimbo: Saturday Morning Adventures - Cover D
- TMNT / Usagi Yojimbo: Saturday Morning Adventures - Dogu Productions Exclusive, with Julie Sakai
- Turtles Of Greyskull #1

2025

- I Hate Fairyland #44
- Marvel Rivals: Ignite #1
- Sai: Dimension Rivals #1
- Ultimate X-Men #15

2026

- Powers 25 #6 - featuring Usagi Yojimbo
- Teenage Mutant Ninja Turtles #300
- Usagi Yojimbo: Kaito '84 - Issues 1-5 Cover Bs

=== Lettering ===
- 47 Ronin - all issues
- Sergio Aragones' Blair Which? - one-shot
- Flash Gordon Adventures - the short story Carrots of DOOM! only
- Groo The Wanderer - all issues and specials
- Riblet - back-up story within the pages of Jeff Smith's Bone
- Rocketeer Adventures - the short story A Dream Of Flying only
- Space Circus - all issues
- The Adventures of Nilson Groundthumper and Hermy
- The Amazing Spider-Man Sunday Newspaper Strips
- The Mighty Magnor - all issues
- Usagi Yojimbo - all issues and specials, excluding Chibi Usagi and Usagi Yojimbo: Kaito '84

=== Trading Cards ===
Sakai has released trading cards featuring Usagi Yojimbo.

- SDCC 2024 Set - Illustrated by Stan Sakai, Julie Sakai & Mitsuhiro Arito
- SDCC 2025 Set - Illustrated by Stan Sakai
- Magic The Gathering x TMNT: Secret Lair Featuring Stan Sakai [Released 2026]
