= Ghost Circles =

2001 book by Jeff Smith

- First US edition cover
- Author: Jeff Smith
- Illustrator: Jeff Smith
- Cover artist: Jeff Smith; Elizabeth Lewis (colourist)
- Language: English
- Series: Bone
- Genre: Fantasy, comedy
- Publisher: Cartoon Books
- Publication date: August 15, 2001
- Publication place: United States
- Media type: Hardback and paperback
- Pages: 184
- ISBN: 1-888963-08-5 (hardback); ISBN 1-888963-09-3 (paperback); ISBN 0-439-70634-3 (paperback)scholastic
- OCLC: 47704024
- Preceded by: Old Man's Cave
- Followed by: Treasure Hunters

Ghost Circles is the seventh book in the Bone series. It collects issues 38-43 of Jeff Smith's self-published Bone comic book series and marks the beginning of the third and final part of the saga, entitled Harvest. The book was published by Cartoon Books in black-and-white in 2001 and in color by Scholastic Press in 2008.

== Synopsis ==
=== End Times ===
At the besieged fortress of Old Man's Cave, the Headmaster of the Veni Yan summons Wendell, the village tinsmith, and explains that the current unrest is not the fault of the Bones. Thorn, he explains, may be sought by the Hooded One. The mountain erupts as the Lord of the Locusts stirs beneath it, and the armies massed outside the fortress begin their attack. The Lord of the Locust resurrects his servant Briar, and sends her to "seek out our missing powers and return them to us". The Bones, Thorn, and Gran'ma Ben flee the collapsing mountain, pursued by Kingdok. As they descend through the tunnel discovered in a previous volume, Fone warns everyone of possible hallucinations; and indeed, Fone and Phoney become costumed as Ishmael and Captain Ahab. Upon leaving the tunnel, they find the valley covered in ash and every tree flattened.

=== The Promise ===
Thorn leads the party across the valley, as the only one who can see and avoid the 'Ghost Circles': invisible pockets of unreality wherein nothing can live, and that separate the intact valley from the illusory wasteland. She and Fone brush the periphery of one, and are momentarily transported back into the forest as it stood before the devastation of the valley. Thorn explains that she can survive it, and even undo the spell, because she retains a piece torn from the Lord of the Locusts' soul.

=== Darker Truths ===
Thorn and Gran'ma Ben remain undecided whether to return to Old Man's Cave or press on to the old capital city of Atheia, but a troop of Rat Creatures blocks the route to Old Man's Cave. A scouting party of Rat Creatures discovers their camp and Thorn and Fone are separated from the others. As Ben fights off the Rat Creatures, her companions are rejoined by Bartleby (Smiley's tame Rat Creature cub). Thorn and Fone discover Briar leading the Rat Creatures to them. She reveals to Fone Bone that he too has a piece of the Lord of the Locusts' soul (a result of his and Thorn's stumbling into the Ghost Circle), thus making Fone her new target as he is deemed a weaker partner for another ritual. Briar is about to kill Thorn, who is no longer necessary to her plans when Smiley and Bartleby come to the rescue.

=== Snap! Crackle! Pop! ===
Pursued by the Rat Creatures, the protagonists lure them into a massive field of Ghost Circles. At Old Man's Cave, Wendell hears the report that the villagers found Lucius Down alive. Wendell tells Lucius that his protégé Jonathan Oaks is alive, but Lucius deduces by the look on Wendell's face that Jonathan has died of his injuries. The Headmaster of the Veni Yan then asks Lucius where Gran'ma Ben and Thorn are, and Lucius believes them en route to Atheia, but the Headmaster distrusts him.

=== The Root Cellar ===
Bartleby warns Thorn's party that Smiley Bone has collapsed in hunger; Phoney Bone asks Thorn for food but hears that all outside the Ghost Circles is destroyed. She and Fone Bone, therefore, enter a Ghost Circle, and thence the root cellar of a farmer's family, where they obtain apples. Here, they hear voices of the farmer's family pleading for help and telling her there is a message from her mother, to "seek out the Crown of Horns" and to take the piece of the Locust from Fone Bone. Thorn does so, and withdraws herself, Fone, and the apples from the Circle. At Old Man's Cave, Wendell hears from Lucius that the latter was Briar and Rose's bodyguard in his youth but mistakenly became enamored of Briar. Wendell tells him that Euclid has been missing since the volcano erupted, and Lucius decides that they all go to Atheia together.

=== Prayer Stones ===
With the piece of the Locust inside her, Thorn grows rapidly weaker. With Phoney and Gran'ma Ben carrying Thorn, the party continues through the Dragons' burial grounds of Tanen Gard, and Thorn is revived by the sacrality thereof. They soon reach the ridge and find the valley beyond clear of the devastation of the Ghost Circles. The presence of Prayer Stones (idols left by Athenians for the Dragons) shows that the Old Kingdom is still alive. As they continue towards the city of Atheia, a lone Locust is seen on one of the prayer stones. At Old Man's Cave the villagers demand of the Veni Yan that they release Lucius and allow an exodus to Atheia. The Veni Yan initially try to stop them, but Lucius convinces them to accompany his party.
