= Bone: The Great Cow Race =

2006 video game

- Developer: Telltale Games
- Publisher: Telltale Games
- Designers: Dave Grossman; Heather Logas
- Composer: Jared Emerson-Johnson
- Engine: Telltale Tool
- Platform: Microsoft Windows
- Release: Windows; NA: April 12, 2006; EU: May 18, 2007; Steam; NA: June 17, 2008
- Genre: Adventure
- Mode: Single-player

Bone: The Great Cow Race is an adventure game by Telltale Games, the second episode of the Bone video game series. It was released in April 2006 after approximately seven months of production. It is based on the second volume of the Bone comic series by Jeff Smith and follows the adventures of cousins Fone Bone, Phoney Bone, and Smiley Bone.

== Plot ==
Bone: The Great Cow Race screenshot, where Phoney Bone (left) is with a cow

The game starts up where Bone: Out from Boneville left off, with the Bone cousins' arrival in Barrel Haven just in time for the Spring Fair and annual Cow Race. In this third-person game, the player gets to control all three Bone cousins (using a technique similar to the one employed in the LucasArts adventure game Day of the Tentacle). Fone Bone, smitten with the lovely Thorn, must find a way to impress her. Phoney Bone cooks up a scheme to swindle the townspeople out of their hard-earned eggs during the Cow Race, and enlists help from his happy-go-lucky cousin Smiley. Little do they know, the Rat Creatures are lurking nearby. Eventually, the Rat Creatures chase Fone on the race, and Phoney has no choice but to reveal his plan, as the Rat Creatures are gaining on them. In the end, Phoney is punished for his crimes.

== Reception ==
Reception

Aggregate scores
Aggregator	Score
GameRankings	77.68%
Metacritic	76/100

Review scores
Publication	Score
1Up.com	C
Adventure Gamers	4/5
Eurogamer	7/10
GamesRadar+	4/5
GameZone	7.5/10
IGN	8.6/10
PC Format	78%
PC Gamer (UK)	55%
PC Gamer (US)	85%
PC Zone	67%
The A.V. Club	B

The game was met with a more positive reception than the first title in the series, Bone: Out from Boneville. GameRankings gave it a score of 77.68%, while Metacritic gave it 76 out of 100.

Comic Book Resources gave it a positive review and called it "a nostalgic romp". GamesRadar gave it a score of four stars out of five and said that the game "boasts pretty, well-animated visuals, excellent voice-acting and a great musical score, especially for an indie title. It's still a little short and none too replayable, but it's a fun little quest while it lasts". PC Zone gave it 67% and called it "a cheaper, slightly longer and certainly more rewarding slice of saccharine silliness than before. Still not perfect, but very, very cute".
