= Crown of Horns (comic) =

2004 book by Jeff Smith

- First US edition cover
- Author: Jeff Smith
- Illustrator: Jeff Smith
- Cover artist: Jeff Smith; Steve Hamaker (colourist)
- Language: English
- Series: Bone
- Genre: Fantasy, comedy
- Publisher: Cartoon Books
- Publication date: June 2004
- Publication place: United States
- Media type: Hardback and paperback
- Pages: 184
- ISBN: 1-888963-15-8
- OCLC: 416123389
- Preceded by: Treasure Hunters

Crown of Horns is the ninth and final book in the Bone series. It collects issues 50-55 of Jeff Smith's self-published Bone comic book series. The book was published by Cartoon Books in 2004. The color version was published by Scholastic Press and released on January 21, 2009.

== Synopsis ==
=== The Dungeon and the Parapet ===
The chapter starts with Thorn's dream of Briar, Queen Lunaria, and Lunaria's husband the king at Dragon's Stair, where Thorn is given to her grandmother, Rose Harvestar/Gran'ma Ben, who delivers her to the Great Red Dragon; almost at the same moment, Thorn's parents are killed. Thorn rides the dragon underground into the cavern containing a bright light. The Great Red Dragon asks Thorn to look into the light, whereupon she mentions a frozen waterfall. After trying to see past this, she sees her mother, who asks her to seek the Crown of Horns. Thorn then wakes, and readers learn that Tarsil's soldiers had beaten and imprisoned Thorn and Fone Bone; each losing a tooth in the process. Meanwhile, Gran'ma Ben, on the city walls, throws an interfering Vedu off the wall and two Veni-Yan monks immediately recognize her and re-enter her service. Briar's army arrives at the main gate and Tarsil defies them. In their conversation, Tarsil reveals his facial injures, received from fighting dragons, to Briar, who responds by making her face an image of his former appearance and cuts him into two halves (possibly a reference to the manner of her own death), and declares the attack. Gran'ma Ben immediately takes charge of the city's army and orders the defense. In the dungeon, Fone Bone hears the fight and shouts for the guard; but learns that Smiley and Phoney are in the next cell, while all the guards have all gone to fight. At the wall, Gran'ma Ben oppose the invading hordes of Pawa soldiers and Rat Creatures when the Venu warn her of an attack on the weaker left flank, whereupon she orders them there as reinforcements. She is then pinned down by Pawan soldiers. Thorn tries to break the iron bars imprisoning herself and her friends, but fails. Fone mentions that in using the Crown of Horns, Thorn might destroy both the Locust and herself; whereupon she promises not to use the Crown of Horns. Taneal, a prophetess-like child featured in the previous collection, brings them a hammer by which to break their shackles while she tries to break the bars of their cell. Her brother then frees Phoney and Smiley. Tarsil's soldiers gather, causing Taneal to hide. When they have gone, Taneal, her brother, Phoney, and Smiley find Thorn comatose as a result of overwhelming visions. As Smiley tries to break the bars, Taneal tells the others that Tarsil was killed and Gran'ma Ben is getting overwhelmed by the Pawa soldiers. Hearing this, Thorn awakes and manages to break out of the cell with her bare hands. On the wall, the dream masters use illusions to scare off the Rat Creatures and the Pawas from climbing over the wall. Thorn, Fone Bone, Phoney, and Smiley rejoin Gran'ma Ben. They watch as the attacking army retreats, and Thorn reveals that ghost circles are surrounding the city.

=== Mim ===
This chapter is a short story of 5 pages, taking place in Thorn's dream, wherein the Red Dragon then tells the story of the Queen of Dragons, Mim, wherein she was subject to demonic possession by the Lord of the Locust. This caused a battle that generated the valley that forms the story's setting.

=== Gaps ===
Gran'ma Ben, Thorn, and the Bones climb a tower, where Thorn may locate the "ghost circles" surrounding the city. Thorn perceives Roque Ja in the hills, and then has sudden visions of the valley exploding, and of the Lord of the Locusts. While the others tend to Thorn, Phoney and Smiley open the well where the city's treasure is hidden, thinking to take the treasure and escape. Thorn's visions tell her that the Lord of the Locusts has re-inhabited Mim, Queen of the Dragons, in whose form he is approaching the city. Phoney and Smiley return to the city's gate with their hay cart (having Smiley's Rat Creature Bartleby and the treasure hidden in the hay), when the farmer who had formerly lost the cart, knocks it over. Bartleby, Phoney, and Smiley climb the ladder (which accidentally knocks out the farmer) Fone and Thorn are descending, where Phoney expresses his disappointment at having lost the treasure. Hearing the words from the arguing Fone and Phoney, Thorn asks Phoney the location of the Crown of Horns, who deduces it is in the sacred burial grounds of the dragons. Thorn leaves the group to search for the Crown of Horns and Fone, refusing to leave with Phoney and determined to protect Thorn, follows her with Bartleby's help.

=== Escape from the City ===
When Fone Bone looks for Thorn on Bartleby's back, they see her as she hides from the invaders in ghost circles. To find Thorn while themselves hidden from the Rat Creatures, Fone hides underneath Bartleby, clinging to his stomach fur (suggesting the trick used by Odysseus to conceal his men from Polyphemus). Beyond the Rat Creatures' location, they encounter Thorn as she emerges from a ghost circle. All three climb the mountains. At the city, the Pawans ram the gates, until Rose orders a sortie. Smiley captures the two stupid Rat Creatures who pursue the Bone cousins throughout the series. Fone and Thorn sneak past Roque Ja to reach the dragons' graveyard; Roque Ja sees them, but lets them pass unharmed. Thorn alone faces an army of their enemies and flies over them, forcing Fone Bone to hide under Bartleby again. They continue to the dragons' graveyard, which Bartleby refuses to enter out of fear of the fury of the dragons.

=== Chamber of Horns ===
Smiley has the idea that if he bakes large quantities of quiche for the two Rat Creatures, they will think that the siege will fail. Phoney and Rose are in a tunnel at Briar's hideout, where they might capture Briar by surprise. Fone descends into the dragon's graveyard, and perceives the Rat Creatures in pursuit. Thorn reaches the Crown, whereupon the Rat Creatures' chieftain Kingdok orders Thorn to kill him, so as to free him from the Lord of the Locust. He even attempts to provoke her by revealing that he was the one who ate Thorn's parents while they were still alive. When Thorn refuses, Kingdok holds her leg in his teeth, and she kills him, but fails to escape. Fone Bone attempts to touch the Crown of Horns himself, but because Thorn took the piece of the locust out from him earlier, nothing happens. Briar strikes down Rose, and is about to kill Rose when Lucius grabs her; simultaneously, Fone takes Thorn's hand and touches the Crown of Horns again, allowing Thorn's piece of the Locust to touch the Crown. This kills Briar, Lucius, and the Lord of the Locust. All of the other dragons awaken and are angry at Fone Bone and Thorn for trespassing and violating the Crown of Horns. However, the Red Dragon rescues Fone and Thorn from his compatriots.

=== Homecoming ===
With Briar and the Lord of the Locust dead and the opposing army slowly being decimated, the capital declares victory. Ted tells the Red Dragon to help Gran'ma against the surviving enemy. The dragon makes short work of them, but an out-of-control Mim is approaching. The other dragons burst out of the earth and envelope Mim, and return to Tanen Gard with her. The capital restores the rule of the royal family and dragons and Bone and Thorn are each given new teeth made from the same material the Crown of Horns is made of, but at Thorn's coronation, Fone Bone questions whether to return to Boneville or to stay in the Valley with Thorn. As the Bone cousins, Thorn, and Gran'ma Ben leave for Barrelhaven to bury Lucius, Phoney is given the hay wagon he lost earlier in the volume, with all of the hidden treasure still in it. After Lucius' burial, Phoney and Fone find that the winter's snow has prevented their leaving the valley, so they stay until the snow melts.

=== Solstice ===
The chapter is a story originally featured in the Bone Holiday Special, and show the Bone cousins, Gran'ma Ben, and Thorn celebrating a "Winter Solstice". As they dance and play instruments, Fone presents the two stupid Rat Creatures with a quiche made by himself.

=== River Crossing ===
After winter, Fone Bone decides to return to Boneville. The Great Red Dragon guides them to the Dragon's Stair. Fone Bone says goodbye to Gran'ma, to the Red Dragon, to the insect Ted, and to Thorn. Before Fone, Smiley, Phoney, and Bartleby leave on their wagon, Phoney discovers that Smiley has exchanged the treasure for the small cakes of stale bread he prefers. Gran'ma gives Phoney some gold coins, which Smiley had stamped with Phoney's image on the latter's orders, arguing that no one wants them (except Phoney himself). As the Bones and Bartleby enter the desert, Phoney Bone claims to despise the bread cakes, to which Smiley replies that he will grow to like them (since it is the only food they have for the journey). Phoney asks for one; at this, Smiley asks to be given a gold coin as payment. When Phoney refuses, Fone insists. This parallels the joke sequence in Out from Boneville, wherein they had similarly discussed a dollar.
