= Rose (comics) =

Comic by Jeff Smith

- Cover of trade paperback

Publication information
- Publisher: Cartoon Books
- Format: Limited series
- Publication date: 2000-2002
- No. of issues: 3

Creative team
- Written by: Jeff Smith
- Artist(s): Charles Vess

Rose is an American comics miniseries, the prequel to the comic book Bone. It was written by Bone creator Jeff Smith and illustrated by Charles Vess, who earned an Eisner nomination for his work on it. The story was originally published as a three-issue miniseries and was later included in both trade paperback and hardcover collections. It takes place when Rose Harvestar was a young woman, before her rise to the Atheian throne.

== Plot ==
The prologue tells the story of how the world was created by a powerful dragon named Mim, who maintained peace and created powerful dreams. She was possessed by the powerful Lord of the Locusts, driving her mad and leading the other dragons to seal her, as well as the Lord of the Locusts, away in stone.

Rose, the youngest of the two sisters, is being trained to be a Veni-Yan-Cari (an "Awakened One"). Her mastery of the Dreaming Arts, a talent possessed by nearly everyone in her family except her older sister Briar, is renowned throughout the Valley. She sets off for Old Man's Cave to take her final exam with Briar, Lucius, the Captain of the Guards, and her two dogs, whom Rose can understand and talk to. It is clear that Rose is falling for Lucius and that he reciprocates her feelings, but he behaves oddly around Briar. The Red Dragon appears and meets with the headmaster to alert him that the River Dragon has gone rogue. On the way, Rose gets her "gitchy feeling" (a manifestation of her dreaming arts), alerting her that something is wrong. She then dreams about freeing a dragon from a river.

The next day, Rose encounters the Red Dragon, who orders her to go to her headmaster. On the way, she is attacked by locusts and then by Balsaad, the River Dragon she freed in her dream. She cuts off his hand, but it suddenly reattaches. Balsaad flees and Rose describes the ordeal and her dream to Briar, who asks her to not tell the Order about it. Rose goes after Balsaad once more and is told by the Red Dragon how to defeat it – at a price. She must take Balsaad to the river where she freed it, kill him, and then kill the next living thing she sees. Meanwhile, Lucius then leads the Veni-Yan-Cari in battle with the rat creatures, who are being led by a mysterious new master to take back the valley.

As Rose leads Balsaad back to the river, she is knocked out and has a dream. It is revealed that Briar is Balsaad's new master and the one who led the rat creatures to the valley. The Lord of the Locusts has discovered Briar's hidden hatred of her sister, inspired by jealousy of the powers Briar would never have as a dreamer and future queen, and has taken advantage of it through her dreams. Rose is about to be killed by the Lord of the Locusts, but Briar stops him, as she wants to be the one to kill her. She then wakes up and kills Balsaad by chopping him up and his body parts are washed away by the river's current, and then Briar appears at almost the same time as one of her dogs. She has aged as punishment for defying the Locust King and begs Rose not to kill her, thus Rose kills her dog rather than Briar. She brings Briar back to the valley and bursts into tears when her other dog asks where its companion is. Later, the people of the valley cheer her victory while the Red Dragon looks on disapprovingly.

== Characters ==
Rose, Briar, Mim, the Lord of the Locusts, and Lucius Down, the bartender at the Barrelhaven Tavern in the original series, have significant roles. The Rat Creatures, monsters for which Bone is well known, also make an appearance, though the ones that have individual personalities in Bone do not appear in Rose. The Veni-Yan, a benevolent religious order, makes an appearance while the Great Red Dragon also does the same. The only characters in Rose that do not appear in Bone are Rose's two talking dogs, whom only she can understand.
