= Jeff Smith (cartoonist) =

American cartoonist (born 1960)

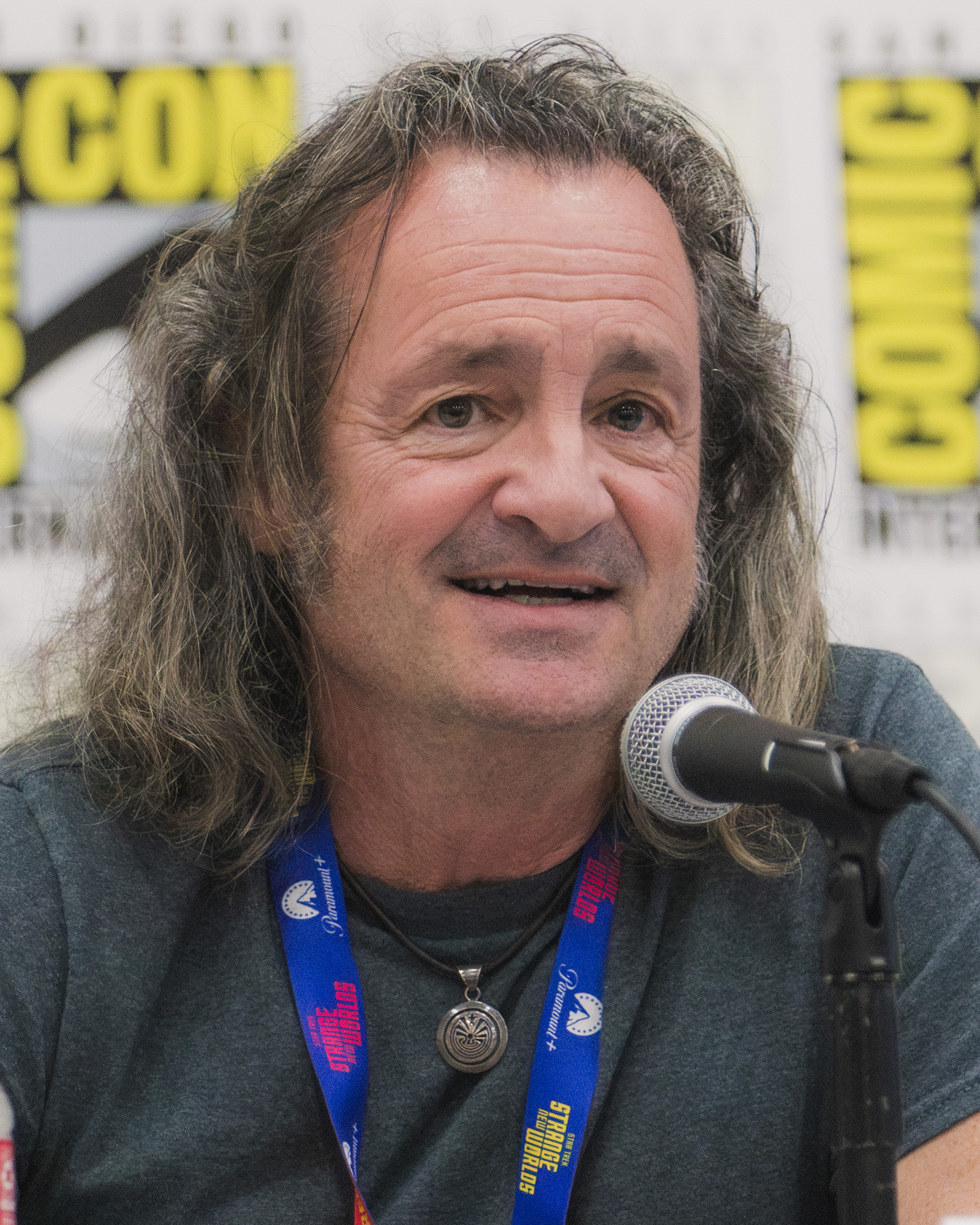
- Smith in 2026
- Born: February 27, 1960 (age 66) McKees Rocks, Pennsylvania, U.S.
- Area: Cartoonist
- Notable works: Bone, Shazam! The Monster Society of Evil, RASL, Tüki Save the Humans
- Awards: 2 National Cartoonists Society Comic Book Awards; 11 Harvey Awards; 10 Eisner Awards

Jeff Smith (born February 27, 1960) is an American cartoonist. He is best known as the creator of the self-published comic book series Bone.

He has received numerous Eisner Awards and Harvey Awards for his work, and in 2026 was nominated for the Eisner Awards Hall of Fame.

== Early life ==
Smith was born on February 27, 1960, in McKees Rocks, Pennsylvania, a suburb of Pittsburgh. His parents are William Earl Smith and Barbara Goodsell. He grew up in Columbus, Ohio.

Smith learned about cartooning through comic strips, comic books, and animated TV shows. The strip he found to be the most entertaining was Charles M. Schulz's Peanuts. His father read it to him every Sunday, and it inspired him to learn to read. Smith was also inspired by Scrooge McDuck creator Carl Barks, whom Smith calls a "natural comic genius" for his ability to move characters effectively from panel to panel, and for their expressiveness. Alluding to the influence of Barks on Bone, Smith commented, "I always wanted Uncle Scrooge to go on a longer adventure. I thought, 'Man, if you could just get a comic book of that quality, the length of say, War and Peace, or The Odyssey or something, that would be something I would love to read, and even as a kid I looked everywhere for that book, that Uncle Scrooge story that was 1,100 pages long." Another seminal influence was the television program The Pogo Special Birthday Special, which Smith saw at age nine. The show was created by Walt Kelly and Chuck Jones, whom Smith later called "two of my most favorite people". The day after that program aired, a girl brought her father's Pogo book to school and gave it to Smith, who says it "changed comics" for him. Smith keeps that book on a table next to his drawing board to this day, and refers to Kelly as his "biggest influence in writing comics".

Smith has cited Moby Dick as his favorite book, citing its multi-layered narrative and symbolism, and placed numerous references to it in Bone. He has also cited Huckleberry Finn as a story after which he attempted to pattern Bone structurally, explaining, "the kinds of stories I’m drawn to, like Huckleberry Finn, are the ones that start off very simple, almost like children’s stories...but as it goes on, it gets a little darker, and the themes become a little more sophisticated and more complex—and those are really the kinds of stories that just get me going." Other influences in this regard include the original Star Wars trilogy, J.R.R. Tolkien's The Lord of the Rings and the classic fairy tales and mythologies that inspired those works.

Smith says the earliest forerunner drawings of what later became Bone and his cousins occurred when he was about five, and sitting in his living room drawing, and he drew what looked like an old C-shaped telephone handset receiver, which emerged as a frowning character with its mouth wide open. Elements of that character and its demeanor found their way into the character Phoney Bone, the upset cousin to Bone. His name is derived from Fonebone, the generic surname that Don Martin gave to many of the characters that appeared in his Mad magazine strips. Smith began to create comics with the Bone characters as early as 1970.

Smith graduated in 1978 from Worthington High School in Worthington, Ohio, a suburb of Columbus, where he was a classmate of Jim Kammerud. Later on, in 1986, Smith and Kammerud co-founded Character Builders, an animation studio in Columbus where Smith worked until 1992. After high school, Smith attended the Ohio State University, and while there he created a comic strip called Thorn for the student newspaper, The Lantern, which included some of the characters who later featured in the Bone series. He also studied animation.

== Career ==
In 1986, Smith left Ohio State University without graduating and co-founded Character Builders Inc. with Jim Kammerud and Marty Fuller. Their first paid job was producing a 60-second animated opening for the TV series Super Safari with Jack Hanna. Other jobs followed for clients such as White Castle, sequences in films that the studio was given when other studios fell behind, and a claymation project that they were given following the rise in popularity of The California Raisins. Initial budgets were restrictive for the studio, which required the animators to be resourceful in order to meet their deadlines. Smith sometimes did the voice work as well as the animation on certain projects, and the animators sometimes had family members come in on some evenings to paint animation cells. Though Smith found the projects exciting, he realized that it was not the type of cartooning he wanted to do, which was complicated by periods in which the studio had no work. It was during one of these slow periods that Smith reconsidered his career. Drawn to the idea that he could produce his own animated-type story but in the comics medium, and convinced by Frank Miller's The Dark Knight Returns, Art Spiegelman's Maus and Alan Moore's Watchmen that a serious comic book with a beginning, middle and end structure was both artistically and commercially viable, Smith decided to produce Bone.

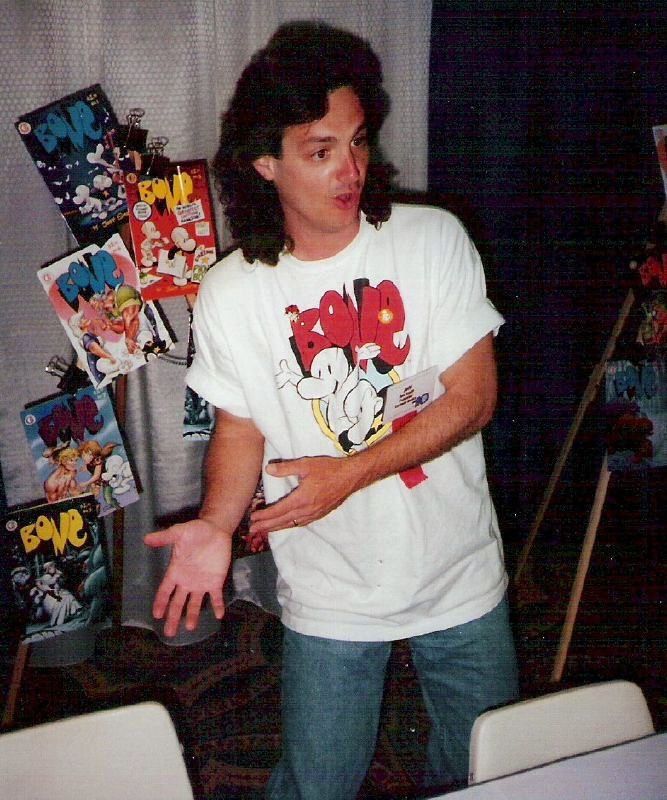
Smith in 1991

In 1991, Smith launched his company, Cartoon Books, in order to publish the series. Initially, Smith self-published the book, which meant that he did all the work required to both produce and distribute the series as a business, including answering letters, doing all the graphics and lettering (which he did by hand), sending the artwork to the printer, handling orders and bookkeeping. This made it difficult to focus on writing and drawing the book, and as a result, he fell behind in his production. To remedy this, he asked his wife, Vijaya, to quit her lucrative job at a Silicon Valley startup company in order to run the business side of Bone as the President of Cartoon Books. As a result, Smith was able to refocus on drawing, and sales improved. Smith published 55 issues of the Bone comic book between 1991 and 2004. The black and white comic book proved extraordinarily successful in terms of both critical response and sales. It has since been collected in a number of trade paperback and hardback collections, including a series of nine books that collect all 55 issues, originally published by Cartoon Books in black and white, and later reissued in color by the Graphix imprint of Scholastic. In 2004, when Cartoon Books released a "mammoth" one-volume black and white collection of the entire nine-volume series, Time critic Andrew Arnold called Bone "the best all-ages graphic novel yet published".

In 1994 Smith created an original cover for Dan DeBono's Indy: The Independent Comic Guide (issue 13), and was interviewed to help to promote his and other alternative comics. Two additional volumes, Stupid, Stupid Rat Tails and Rose, collect a number of Bone prequel comics created by Smith and his collaborators.

In 1995 French publisher Delcourt acquired the rights to translate Bone into French. The translator of the first four French volumes was Alain Ayroles who would be inspired by Smith's storytelling and go on to write the successful Garulfo series, among others.

In 2003, Smith began work for DC Comics on a miniseries starring Captain Marvel, a superhero of which Smith is a fan. The series, entitled Shazam! The Monster Society of Evil, was published in four prestige format issues in 2007, and later collected into a hardcover edition.

In 2007, Fantagraphics Books named Smith as the designer for an upcoming series of books collecting the complete run of Walt Kelly's Pogo. He also designed the cover art for Say Anything's album In Defense of the Genre.

Smith released the first issue of RASL, "a stark, sci-fi series about a dimension-jumping art thief with personal problems", in February, 2008. A six-page preview was shown on the 2007 San Diego Comic-Con. Originally intending RASL to be released in an oversized format, Smith consulted with retailers who unanimously cautioned him against the unconventional size. Smith later self-published RASL as a standard-sized, ad-free, black and white comic book. The first trade paperback, titled The Drift, was published in the oversized format Smith had originally intended..

Smith's art was featured in a pair of museum shows in Columbus in mid-2008: "Jeff Smith: Bone and Beyond" at the Wexner Center for the Arts, and "Jeff Smith: Before Bone" at the Cartoon Research Library of Ohio State University. The exhibits were featured in a segment on the PBS news program The NewsHour with Jim Lehrer on July 21, 2008.

In 2009, Smith was featured in The Cartoonist: Jeff Smith, BONE, and the Changing Face of Comics, a documentary film on his life and work.

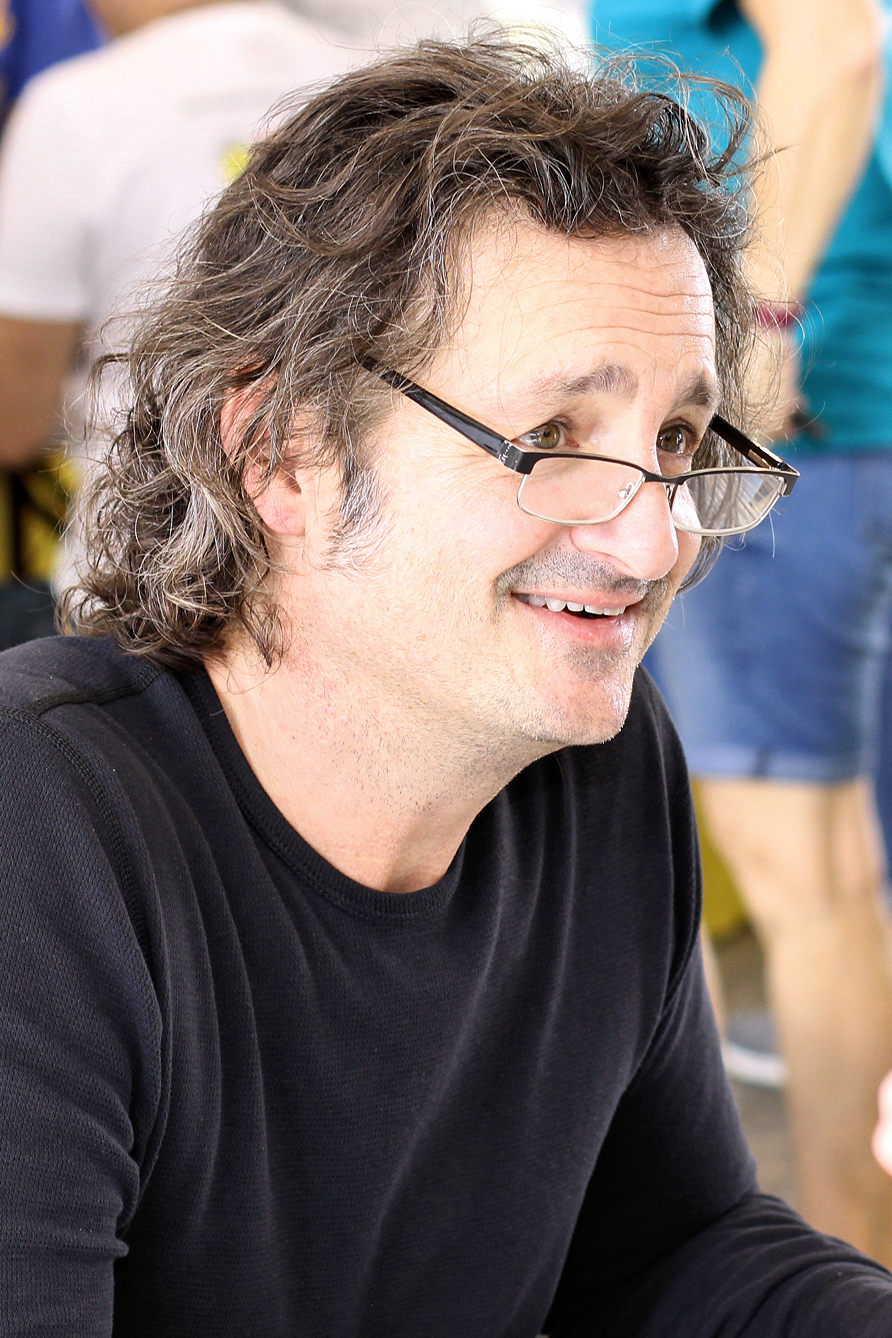
Smith at the 2018 Texas Book Festival

In September that same year, Toon Books, the children's book line launched by cartoonist Art Spiegelman and New Yorker art editor Françoise Mouly, released Little Mouse Gets Ready, a 32-page children's graphic novel written by Smith and aimed at very young "emerging readers". In a February 2009 Newsarama interview, Smith noted that the book featured another character Smith created in his childhood, "a little gray mouse with a little red vest".

In March 2013, Smith said his next project would be a webcomic series called Tüki: Save the Humans, which tells the story of the first human to leave Africa. The web publication began in November 2013 and the print version was first released in July 2014. The fourth issue was delayed due to a hand injury, sustained by Smith, but after its release in February 2016 the series was put on hiatus in June 2016 due to the need to rework the strip. The project was later reworked as a series of graphic novels. In 2021, Smith launched a Kickstarter campaign for Tuki: Fight for Fire and Tuki: Fight for Family; the first volume reached the book trade later that year.

From 2013 to 2018, Smith served on the board of the Comic Book Legal Defense Fund, a non-profit organization founded in 1986 chartered to protect the First Amendment rights of the comics community.

Smith helped found the annual Cartoon Crossroads Columbus festival, which debuted in 2015. He serves as artistic director of the convention.

In 2018, Scholastic published Smiley's Dream Book, Smith's picture book featuring Smiley Bone. Smith returned to the Bone setting in 2023 with More Tall Tales, written with Tom Sniegoski and illustrated by Smith, Stan Sakai, Katie Cook, Matt Smith, and Scott Brown..

In 2024, Cartoon Books published Thorn: The Complete Proto-Bone College Strips 1982 - 1986, and Other Early Drawings, a collection of Smith's university newspaper strip.

== Personal life ==
Smith lives in Columbus, Ohio, with his wife and business manager, Vijaya Iyer.

On August 13, 2023, Smith suffered a cardiac arrest. As a result, the remainder of his book tour was cancelled.

== Awards and accolades ==
For his work on Bone, Smith has received numerous awards, among them ten Eisner Awards and eleven Harvey Awards. In 1995 and 1996 he won the National Cartoonists Society's award for Comic Books.

In 2022 Tuki: Fight for Fire was included in the American Library Association's list of the Best Graphic Novels for Adults Reading List.

=== Eisner Awards ===
- 1993 Eisner Award for Best Humor Publication
- 1994 Eisner Award for Best Serialized Story (for "The Great Cow Race"; Bone #8-10)
- 1994 Eisner Award for Best Continuing Series
- 1994 Eisner Award for Best Writer/Artist
- 1994 Eisner Award for Best Humor Publication
- 1995 Eisner Award for Best Humor Publication
- 1995 Eisner Award for Best Writer/Artist—Humor
- 1995 Eisner Award for Best Continuing Series
- 1998 Eisner Award for Best Writer/Artist: Humor
- 2005 Eisner Award for Best Graphic Album: Reprint (for Bone One Volume Edition)
- 2014 Eisner Award for Best Graphic Album: Reprint (for RASL)

=== Harvey Awards ===
- 1994 Harvey Award for Best Cartoonist (Writer/Artist)
- 1994 Harvey Award Special Award for Humor
- 1994 Harvey Award for Best Graphic Album of Previously Published Work (for The Complete Bone Adventures. Reissued in color as Bone: Out from Boneville; [Scholastic Corporation])
- 1995 Harvey Award for Best Cartoonist (Writer/Artist)
- 1996 Harvey Award for Best Cartoonist (Writer/Artist)
- 1997 Harvey Award for Best Cartoonist (Writer/Artist)
- 1999 Harvey Award for Best Cartoonist (Writer/Artist), for his body of work in 1998, including Bone
- 2000 Harvey Award for Best Cartoonist (Writer/Artist)
- 2003 Harvey Award for Best Cartoonist (Writer/Artist)
- 2005 Harvey Award for Best Cartoonist (Writer/Artist)
- 2005 Harvey Award for Best Graphic Album of Previously Published Work: Bone: One Volume Edition

=== Nominations ===
- 1993 Eisner Award for Best Writer/Artist
- 1995 Eisner Award for Best Single Issue (for Bone #16: "Eyes of the Storm")
- 1995 Eisner Award for Best Comics-Related Item (for Bone figurine, shared with Randy Bowen)
- 1996 Eisner Award for Best Title for Younger Readers
- 1998 Eisner Award for Best Continuing Series
- 1998 Eisner Award for Best Comics-Related Product (for Bone Red Dragon cold-cast statue, shared with Randy Bowen)
- 1998 Eisner Award for Best Comics Publication for a Younger Audience
- 1999 Eisner Award for Best Comics-Related Product/Item (for Phoney Bone inflatable)
- 2003 Eisner Award for Best Graphic Album Reprint (for Bone vol. 8: Treasure Hunters)
- 2004 Eisner Award for Best Writer/Artist
- 2005 Eisner Award for Best Comics Publication for a Younger Audience
- 2026 Eisner Award Hall of Fame Nominee
