= Eisner Award for Best Graphic Album — Reprint =

American comic book award

- Country: United States
- First award: 1991
- Most recent winner: Superman's Pal Jimmy Olsen: The Deluxe Edition
- Website: www.comic-con.org/awards/eisner-awards/

The Eisner Award for Best Graphic Album — Reprint is an award for "creative achievement" in American comic books. It has been given out every year since 1991.

== Winners and nominees ==
Year	Title	Creators	Publisher	Ref.
1990s
1991	Sandman: The Doll's House	Neil Gaiman and various artists	DC	
1992	Maus II	Art Spiegelman	Pantheon Books	
1992	Give Me Liberty	Frank Miller and Dave Gibbons		
1992	Groo Chronicles	Mark Evanier and Sergio Aragones	Graphitti	
1992	Love and Rockets, Book 9: Flies On the Ceiling	Jaime Hernández and Gilbert Hernández	Fantagraphics	
1992	Sandman: Dream Country	Neil Gaiman, Charles Vess, Colleen Doran, Kelly Jones, and Malcolm Jones III	DC	
1993	Sin City	Frank Miller	Dark Horse	
1993	Brat Pack	Rick Veitch	King Hell/Tundra	
1993	Jaka's Story	Dave Sim and Gerhard	Aardvark-Vanaheim	
1993	Peep Show!	Joe Matt	Kitchen Sink	
1993	Sandman: Season of Mists	Neil Gaiman and various artists	DC	
1994	Cerebus: Flight (Mothers and Daughters, Book 1)	Dave Sim and Gerhard	Aardvark-Vanaheim	
1994	Best of Drawn & Quarterly	Chris Oliveros, Marina Lesenko, and Steve Salomos (editor)	Drawn & Quarterly	
1994	Blood Club	Charles Burns	Kitchen Sink	
1994	Complete Bojeffries Saga	Alan Moore and Steve Parkhouse	Kitchen Sink	
1994	R. Crumb Draws the Blues	Robert Crumb	Last Gasp	
1995	Hellboy: Seeds of Destruction	Mike Mignola	Dark Horse	
1995	Andrew Vachss' Hard Looks Book I	Jerry Prosser (editor)	Dark Horse	
1995	The Collected Strangers in Paradise	Terry Moore	Abstract Studio	
1995	The Complete Concrete	Paul Chadwick	Dark Horse	
1995	Love and Rockets 12: Poison River	Gilbert Hernández	Fantagraphics	
1996	The Tale of One Bad Rat	Bryan Talbot	Dark Horse	
1996	Concrete: Killer Smile	Paul Chadwick	Dark Horse	
1996	Pussey!	Dan Clowes	Fantagraphics	
1996	Sandman Mystery Theatre: The Tarantula	Matt Wagner and Guy Davis	DC/Vertigo	
1996	32 Stories	Adrian Tomine	Drawn & Quarterly	
1997	Stray Bullets: Innocence of Nihilism	David Lapham	El Capitan	
1997	Daddy's Girl	Debbie Drechsler	Fantagraphics	
1997	It's a Good Life, If You Don't Weaken	Seth	Drawn & Quarterly	
1997	Kurt Busiek's Astro City: Life in the Big City	Kurt Busiek and Brent Anderson	Jukebox Productions/Homage)	
1997	Mr. Monster: Origins	Michael T. Gilbert	Graphitti Designs	
1997	Sandman: The Wake	Neil Gaiman, Michael Zulli, Jon J. Muth, Charles Vess	DC/Vertigo	
1998	Sin City: That Yellow Bastard	Frank Miller	Dark Horse	
1998	Age of Reptiles: The Hunt	Ricardo Delgado	Dark Horse	
1998	Ghost World	Dan Clowes	Fantagraphics	
1998	The System	Peter Kuper	DC/Vertigo	
1998	Terminal City	Dean Motter and Michael Lark	DC/Vertigo	
1999	Batman: The Long Halloween	Jeph Loeb and Tim Sale	DC	
1999	Cages	Dave McKean	Kitchen Sink	
1999	Caricature	Dan Clowes	Fantagraphics	
1999	Hellboy: The Chained Coffin and Others	Mike Mignola	Dark Horse	
1999	Booze, Broads, and Bullets	Frank Miller	Dark Horse	
2000s
2000	From Hell	Alan Moore and Eddie Campbell	Eddie Campbell Comics	
2000	Geisha	Andi Watson	Oni	
2000	Land of Nod Rockabye Book	Jay Stephens	Dark Horse	
2000	300	Frank Miller and Lynn Varley	Dark Horse	
2000	Whiteout	Greg Rucka and Steve Lieber	Oni	
2001	Jimmy Corrigan	Chris Ware	Pantheon	
2001	Clan Apis	Jay Hosler	Active Synapse	
2001	The Collected Hutch Owen, Vol. 1	Tom Hart	Top Shelf	
2001	Dear Julia	Brian Biggs	Top Shelf	
2001	Julius Knipl: The Beauty Supply District	Ben Katchor	Pantheon	
2001	Mirror, Window	Jessica Abel	Fantagraphics	
2002	Batman: Dark Victory	Jeph Loeb and Tim Sale	DC	
2002	Berlin: City of Stones	Jason Lutes	Drawn & Quarterly	
2002	Box Office Poison	Alex Robinson	Top Shelf	
2002	Scatterbrain	Phil Amara and Scott Allie	Dark Horse Maverick	
2002	Stray Bullets: Other People	David Lapham	El Capitan	
2003	Batman: Black and White, vol. 2	Mark Chiarello and Nick J. Napolitano (editors)	DC	
2003	After the Snooter	Eddie Campbell	Eddie Campbell Books	
2003	Beg the Question	Bob Fingerman	Fantagraphics	
2003	Bone Vol. 8: Treasure Hunters	Jeff Smith	Cartoon Books	
2003	Boulevard of Broken Dreams	Kim Deitch	Pantheon	
2003	Fair Weather	Joe Matt	Drawn & Quarterly	
2004	Batman Adventures: Dangerous Dames and Demons	Paul Dini, Bruce Timm, and others	DC	
2004	The Frank Book	Jim Woodring	Fantagraphics	
2004	Louis Riel: A Comic-Strip Biography	Chester Brown	Drawn & Quarterly	
2004	The P. Craig Russell Library of Opera Adaptations, vols. 1 & 2	P. Craig Russell	NBM	
2004	Palomar: The Heartbreak Soup Stories	Gilbert Hernández	Fantagraphics	
2004	Quimby the Mouse	Chris Ware	Fantagraphics	
2005	Bone One Volume Edition	Jeff Smith	Cartoon Books	
2005	Age of Bronze: Sacrifice	Eric Shanower	Image	
2005	The Book of Ballads	Charles Vess, et al.	Tor	
2005	Clyde Fans	Seth	Drawn & Quarterly	
2005	In the Shadow of No Towers	Art Spiegelman	Pantheon	
2005	Locas	Jaime Hernández	Fantagraphics	
2006	Black Hole	Charles Burns	Pantheon	
2006	Acme Novelty Library Annual Report to Shareholders	Chris Ware	Pantheon	
2006	Feast of the Seven Fishes	Robert Tinnell, Ed Piskor, and Alex Saviuk	Allegheny Image Factory	
2006	Ice Haven	Dan Clowes	Pantheon	
2006	War's End	Joe Sacco	Drawn & Quarterly	
2007	Absolute DC: The New Frontier	Darwyn Cooke	DC	
2007	Castle Waiting	Linda Medley	Fantagraphics	
2007	Mom's Cancer	Brian Fies	Abrams	
2007	Shadowland	Kim Deitch	Fantagraphics	
2007	Truth Serum	Jon Adams	City Cyclops	
2008	Mouse Guard: Fall 1152	David Petersen	Archaia	
2008	Agents of Atlas Hardcover	Jeff Parker, Leonard Kirk, and Kris Justice	Marvel	
2008	Godland Celestial Edition	Joe Casey and Tom Scioli	Image	
2008	James Sturm's America: God, Gold, and Golems	James Sturm	Drawn & Quarterly	
2008	Super Spy	Matt Kindt	Top Shelf	
2009	Hellboy Library Edition, vols. 1 and 2	Mike Mignola	Dark Horse	
2009	Berlin Book 2: City of Smoke	Jason Lutes	Drawn & Quarterly	
2009	Sam & Max Surfin’ the Highway Anniversary Edition HC	Steve Purcell	Telltale Games	
2009	Skyscrapers of the Midwest	Joshua W. Cotter	AdHouse	
2009	The Umbrella Academy, vol. 1: Apocalypse Suite Deluxe Edition	Gerard Way and Gabriel Bá	Dark Horse	
2010s
2010	Absolute Justice	Alex Ross, Jim Krueger, and Doug Braithewaite	DC	
2010	A.D.: New Orleans After the Deluge	Josh Neufeld	Pantheon	
2010	Alec: The Years Have Pants	Eddie Campbell	Top Shelf	
2010	Essex County Collected	Jeff Lemire	Top Shelf	
2010	Map of My Heart: The Best of King-Cat Comics & Stories, 1996–200	John Porcellino	Drawn & Quarterly	
2011	Wednesday Comics	Mark Chiarello (editor)	DC	
2011	The Amazing Screw-on Head and Other Curious Objects	Mike Mignola	Dark Horse	
2011	Beasts of Burden: Animal Rites	Evan Dorkin and Jill Thompson	Dark Horse	
2011	Motel Art Improvement Service	Jason Little	Dark Horse	
2011	The Simpsons/Futurama Crossover Crisis	Ian Boothby, James Lloyd, and Steve Steere Jr.	Abrams Comicarts	
2011	Tumor	Joshua Hale Fialkov and Noel Tuazon	Archaia	
2012	Richard Stark’s Parker: The Martini Edition	Darwyn Cooke	IDW	
2012	Big Questions	Anders Nilsen	Drawn & Quarterly	
2012	The Death Ray	Dan Clowes	Drawn & Quarterly	
2012	WE3: The Deluxe Edition	Grant Morrison and Frank Quitely	Vertigo/DC	
2012	Zahra's Paradise	Amir and Khalil	First Second	
2013	King City	Brandon Graham	TokyoPop/Image	
2013	Cruisin' with the Hound	Spain	Fantagraphics	
2013	Ed the Happy Clowm	Chester Brown	Drawn & Quarterly	
2013	Everything Together: Collected Stories	Sammy Harkham	PictureBox	
2013	Heads or Tails	Lilli Carre	Fantagraphics	
2013	Sailor Twain, or The Mermaid in the Hudson	Mark Siegel	First Second	
2014	RASL	Jeff Smith	Cartoon Books	
2014	The Creep	John Arcudi and Jonathan Case	Dark Horse	
2014	Hand-Drying in America and Other Stories	Ben Katchor	Pantheon	
2014	Heck	Zander Cannon	Top Shelf	
2014	Julio’s Day	Gilbert Hernández	Fantagraphics	
2014	Solo: The Deluxe Edition	Mark Chiarello (editor)	DC	
2015	Through the Woods	E. M. Carroll	McElderry Books	
2015	Dave Dorman’s Wasted Lands Omnibus	Dave Dorman	Magnetic Press	
2015	How to Be Happy	Eleanor Davis	Fantagraphics	
2015	Jim	Jim Woodring	Fantagraphics	
2015	Sock Monkey Treasury	Tony Millionaire	Fantagraphics	
2016	Nimona	ND Stevenson	Harper Teen	
2016	Angry Youth Comics	Johnny Ryan	Fantagraphics	
2016	Roses in December: A Story of Love and Alzheimer’s	Tom Batiuk and Chuck Ayers	Kent State University Press	
2016	The Less Than Epic Adventures of TJ and Amal Omnibus	E. K. Weaver	Iron Circus Comics	
2016	Soldier’s Heart: The Campaign to Understand My WWII Veteran Father	Carol Tyler	Fantagraphics	
2017	Demon	Jason Shiga	First Second	
2017	Incomplete Works	Dylan Horrocks	Alternative	
2017	Last Look	Charles Burns	Pantheon	
2017	Meat Cake Bible	Dame Darcy	Fantagraphics	
2017	Megg and Mog in Amsterdam and Other Stories	Simon Hanselmann	Fantagraphics	
2017	She’s Not into Poetry	Tom Hart	Alternative	
2018	Boundless	Jillian Tamaki	Drawn & Quarterly	
2018	Fantagraphics Studio Edition: Black Hole by Charles Burns	Charles Burns, edited by Eric Reynolds	Fantagraphics	
2018	Small Favors: The Definitive Girly Porno Collection	Colleen Coover	Oni/Limerence	
2018	Sticks Angelica, Folk Hero	Michael DeForge	Drawn & Quarterly	
2018	Unreal City	D. J. Bryant	Fantagraphics	
2019	The Vision hardcover	Tom King, Gabriel Hernandez Walta, and Michael Walsh	Marvel	
2019	Berlin	Jason Lutes	Drawn & Quarterly	
2019	Girl Town	Carolyn Nowak	Top Shelf/IDW	
2019	Upgrade Soul	Ezra Claytan Daniels	Lion Forge	
2019	Young Frances	Hartley Lin	AdHouse Books	
2020s
2020	LaGuardia	Nnedi Okorafor and Tana Ford	Berger Books/Dark Horse	
2020	Bad Weekend	Ed Brubaker and Sean Phillips	Image	
2020	Clyde Fans	Seth	Drawn & Quarterly	
2020	Cover, vol. 1	Brian Michael Bendis and David Mack	DC/Jinxworld	
2020	Glenn Ganges: The River at Night	Kevin Huizenga	Drawn & Quarterly	
2020	Rusty Brown	Chris Ware	Pantheon	
2021	Seeds and Stems	Simon Hanselmann	Fantagraphics	
2021	Black Hammer Library Edition, vol. 2	Jeff Lemire, Dean Ormstom, Emi Lenox, and Rich Tommaso	Dark Horse	
2021	Criminal Deluxe Edition, vol. 3	Ed Brubaker and Sean Phillips	Image	
2021	Eight-Lane Runaways	Henry McCausland	Fantagraphics	
2021	Fante Bukowski: The Complete Works	Noah Van Sciver	Fantagraphics	
2021	Herobear and the Kid: The Heritage	Mike Kunkel	Astonish Factory	
2022	The Complete American Gods	Neil Gaiman, P. Craig Russell, and Scott Hampton	Dark Horse	
2022	Locke & Key: Keyhouse Compendium	Joe Hill and Gabriel Rodríguez	IDW	
2022	Middlewest: The Complete Tale	Skottie Young and Jorge Corona	Image	
2022	Rick and Morty vs. Dungeons and Dragons Deluxe Edition	Patrick Rothfuss, Jim Zub, and Troy Little	Oni	
2022	The True Lives of the Fabulous Killjoys: California Deluxe Edition	Gerard Way, Shaun Simon, and Becky Cloonan	Dark Horse	
2023	Parker: The Martini Edition—Last Call	Richard Stark, Darwyn Cooke, Ed Brubaker, and Sean Phillips	IDW	
2023	Days of Sand	Aimée de Jongh, translation by Christopher Bradley	SelfMadeHero	
2023	Geneviève Castrée: Complete Works	Geneviève Castrée, translation by Phil Elverum and Aleshia Jensen	Drawn & Quarterly	
2023	Mazebook Dark Horse Direct Edition	Jeff Lemire	Dark Horse	
2023	One Beautiful Spring Day	Jim Woodring	Fantagraphics	
2023	Super Spy Deluxe Edition	Matt Kindt	Dark Horse	
2024	Hip Hop Family Tree: The Omnibus	Ed Piskor	Fantagraphics	
2024	Wonder Woman Historia: The Amazons	Kelly Sue DeConnick, Phil Jimenez, Gene Ha, and Nicola Scott	DC	
2024	Doctor Strange: Fall Sunrise Treasury Edition	Tradd Moore	Marvel	
2024	The Good Asian	Pornsak Pichetshote and Alexandre Tefenkgi	Image	
2024	Orange Complete Series Box Set	Ichigo Takano, translated by Amber Tamosaitis	Seven Seas	
2025	The One Hand and The Six Fingers	Ram V, Dan Watters, Laurence Campbell, and Sumit Kumar	Image	
2025	Breaking the Chain: The Guard Dog Story	Patrick McDonnell	Abrams ComicArts	
2025	Lackadaisy, vols. 1–2	Tracy J. Butler	Iron Circus	
2025	Rescue Party: A Graphic Anthology of COVID Lockdown	Gabe Fowler (editor)	Pantheon	
2025	Seattle Samurai: A Cartoonist’s Perspective of the Japanese American Experience	Kelly Goto and Sam Goto	Chin Music Press	
2025	UM Volume One	buttercup	Radiator Comics	
2026	Superman's Pal, Jimmy Olsen: The Deluxe Edition	Matt Fraction and Steve Lieber	DC	
2026	Beneath the Trees Where Nobody Sees: Storybook Edition	Patrick Horvath	IDW Publishing	
2026	Ginseng Roots: A Memoir	Craig Thompson	Pantheon	
2026	Goes Like This	Jordan Crane	Fantagraphics	
2026	Tongues	Anders Nilsen	Pantheon	
