= Harvey Award for Book of the Year =

American literary award

Book of the Year
- Country: United States
- First award: 2018

The Harvey Award for Book of the Year, established in 2018 as part of the Harvey Awards, is an annual American award for comics and graphic novels. Per the Harvey Awards website, the award honors the "best long-form graphic novel or collection that demonstrating excellence in writing, art or cartooning showcasing great representation of the form."

In 2018, the Harvey Awards were revamped into six categories, recognizing works as opposed to individual creators as in previous years.

== Winner and nominees ==
Book of the Year Award nominees, 2018–present
Year	Title	Author	Publisher	Result	Ref.
2018	Monstress	Marjorie Liu and Sana Takeda	Image Comics	Winner	
2018	Black Hammer: Secret Origins	Jeff Lemire, Dean Ormston and Dave Stewart	Black Horse	Finalist	
2018	Boundless	Jillian Tamaki	Drawn and Quarterly	Finalist	
2018	Everything is Flammable	Gabrielle Bell	Uncivilized Books	Finalist	
2018	Hostage	Guy Delisle	Drawn and Quarterly	Finalist	
2018	Kindred	Octavia E. Butler, adapted by Damian Duffy and illustrated by John Jennings	Abrams ComicArts	Finalist	
2018	Lighter Than My Shadow	Katie Green	Lion Forge	Finalist	
2018	My Favorite Thing is Monsters	Emil Ferris	Fantagraphics	Finalist	
2018	Roughneck	Jeff Lemire	Gallery 13	Finalist	
2018	Shade the Changing Girl	Cecil Castellucci and Marley Zarcone	DC Comics	Finalist	
2018	Spinning	Tillie Walden	First Second	Finalist	
2018	The Best We Could Do	Thi Bui	Abrams Books	Finalist	
2018	The Customer is Always Wrong	Mimi Pond	Drawn and Quarterly	Finalist	
2018	The Best We Could Do	Mark Russell and Steve Pugh	DC Comics	Finalist	
2018	The Prince and the Dressmaker	Jen Wang	First Second	Finalist	
2019	Hey Kiddo	Jarrett J. Krosoczka	Scholastic Graphix	Winner	
2019	Belonging: A German Reckons with History and Home	Nora Krug	Scribner	Finalist	
2019	Berlin	Jason Lutes	Drawn & Quarterly	Finalist	
2019	BTTM FDRS	Ezra Claytan Daniels and Ben Passmore	Fantagraphics	Finalist	
2019	Kid Gloves	Lucy Knisley	First Second	Finalist	
2019	Laura Dean Keeps Breaking Up With Me	Mariko Tamaki and Rosemary Valero-O'Connell	First Second	Finalist	
2019	My Heroes Have Always Been Junkies	Ed Brubaker and Sean Phillips	Image	Finalist	
2019	On a Sunbeam	Tillie Walden	First Second	Finalist	
2019	Upgrade Soul	Ezra Claytan Daniels	Lion Forge	Finalist	
2019	When I Arrived at the Castle	E.M. Carroll	Koyama Press	Finalist	
2020	Dragon Hoops	Gene Luen Yang	First Second Books	Winner	
2020	Are You Listening?	Tillie Walden	First Second	Finalist	
2020	Grass	Keum Suk Gendry-Kim	Drawn and Quarterly	Finalist	
2020	The Hard Tomorrow	Eleanor Davis	Drawn and Quarterly	Finalist	
2020	Invisible Kingdom Vol. 1	G. Willow Wilson and Christian Ward	Dark Horse Books/Berger Books	Finalist	
2020	Little Bird: The Fight for Elder's Hope	Darcy Van Poelgeest and Ian Bertram	Image Comics	Finalist	
2020	Making Comics	Lynda Barry	Drawn and Quarterly	Finalist	
2020	Reincarnation Stories	Kim Deitch	Fantagraphics	Finalist	
2020	Rusty Brown	Chris Ware	Pantheon Graphic Library	Finalist	
2020	Something is Killing the Children Vol. 1	James Tynion IV and Werther Dell'Edera	BOOM! Studios	Finalist	
2021	The Magic Fish	Trung Le Nguyen	Random House	Winner	
2021	The Book Tour	Andi Watson	Top Sheld Productions	Finalist	
2021	Cyclopedia Exotica	Aminder Dhaliwal	Drawn & Quarterly	Finalist	
2021	Department of Truth, Vol 1: The End Of The World	James Tynion IV, Martin Simmonds	Image Comics	Finalist	
2021	Heaven No Hell	Michael DeForge	Drawn & Quarterly	Finalist	
2021	Kent State: Four Dead in Ohio	Derf Backderf	Abrams	Finalist	
2021	Monsters	Barry Windsor-Smith	Fantagraphics	Finalist	
2021	Stone Fruit	Lee Lai	Fantgraphics	Finalist	
2021	Superman's Pal Jimmy Olsen: Who Killed Jimmy Olsen?	Matt Fraction and Steve Lieber	DC Comics	Finalist	
2021	Save It For Later: Promises, Protest and Parenthood	Nate Powell	Abrams	Finalist	
2022	The Good Asian, Vol. 1	Pornsak Pichetshote and Alexandre Tefenkgi	Image Comics	Winner	
2022	Ballad for Sophie	Filipe Melo and Juan Cavia	Top Shelf Productions	Finalist	
2022	Crisis Zone	Simon Hanselmann	Fantagraphics	Finalist	
2022	Department of Truth, Vol 3: Free Country	James Tynion IV, Jorge Fornes, David Romero, John J. Pearson, Tyler Boss, Elsa Charretier and Alison Sampson	Image Comics	Finalist	
2022	Far Sector	N. K. Jemisin and Jamal Campbell	DC Comics	Finalist	
2022	The Many Deaths of Laila Starr	Ram V, Filipe Andrade, and Ines Amaro	BOOM! Studios	Finalist	
2022	Lightfall Book 2: Shadow of the Bird	Tim Probert	HarperAlley	Finalist	
2022	The Nice House on the Lake	James Tynion IV and Alvaro Martinez Bueno	DC Comics	Finalist	
2022	Run: Book One	John Lewis, Andrew Aydin, L. Fury and Nate Powell	Abrams Books	Finalist	
2022	Sisters of the Mist	Marlyn Spaaij	Flying Eye Books	Finalist	
2023	Ducks: Two Years in the Oil Sands	Kate Beaton	Drawn & Quarterly	Winner	
2023	Acting Class	Nick Drnaso	Drawn and Quarterly	Finalist	
2023	Follow Me Down: A Reckless Book	Ed Brubaker, Sean Phillips and Jacob Phillips	Image Comics	Finalist	
2023	Girl Juice	Benji Nate	Drawn and Quarterly	Finalist	
2023	It's Lonely at the Centre of the Earth	Zoe Thorogood	Image Comics	Finalist	
2023	Little Monsters Vol. 1	Jeff Lemire and Dustin Nguyen	Image Comics	Finalist	
2023	The Man in the McIntosh Suit	Rina Ayuyang	Drawn and Quarterly	Finalist	
2023	Mimosa	Archie Bongiovanni	Abrams ComicArts/Surely	Finalist	
2023	Public Domain Vol. 1	Chip Zdarsky	Image Comics	Finalist	
2023	Who Will Make The Pancakes	Megan Kelso	Fantagraphics	Finalist	
2024	Roaming	Jillian Tamaki and Mariko Tamaki	Drawn & Quarterly	Winner	
2024	Monica	Daniel Clowes	Fantagraphics	Finalist	
2024	A Guest in the House	E.M. Carroll	Macmillan Publishers	Finalist	
2024	My Favorite Thing is Monsters Vol. 2	Emil Ferris	Fantagraphics	Finalist	
2024	Shubeik Lubeik	Deena Mohamed	Penguin Random House	Finalist	
2024	Watership Down Graphic Novel	James Sturm and Joe Sutphin, based on the novel by Richard Adams	Penguin Random House	Finalist	
2024	Tender	Beth Hetland	Fantagraphics	Finalist	
2024	Lunar New Year Love Story	Gene Luen Yang and LeUyen Pham	Macmillan Publishers	Finalist	
2024	Love Everlasting	Tom King and Elsa Charretier	Image	Finalist	
2024	Where the Body Was	Ed Brubaker and Sean Philips	Image	Finalist	
2024	Radiant Black Vol. 5	Kyle Higgins, Joe Clark, Eduardo Ferigato, and Marcelo Costa	Image	Finalist	
2025	Beneath the Trees Where Nobody Sees	Patrick Horvath	IDW Publishing	Winner	
2025	Final Cut	Charles Burns	Pantheon	Finalist	
2025	Ultimate Spider-Man Vol. 1	Jonathan Hickman and Marco Checchetto	Marvel Comics	Finalist	
2025	Helen of Wyndhorn	Tom King and Bilquis Evely	IDW Publishing	Finalist	
2025	Precious Metal: From the World of Little Bird	Darcy Van Poelgeest and Ian Bertram	Image Comics	Finalist	
2026	Absolute Batman Vol. 1: The Zoo	Scott Snyder and Nick Dragotta	DC	Winner	
2026	Absolute Martian Manhunter Vol. 1: Martian Vision	Deniz Camp and Javier Rodriguez	DC	Finalist	
2026	Black Arms to Hold You Up: A History of Black Resistance	Ben Passmore	Pantheon	Finalist	
2026	Cannon	Lee Lai	Drawn & Quarterly	Finalist	
2026	Drome	Jesse Lonergan	23rd Street Books/Macmillan	Finalist	
2026	The Ephemerata: Shaping the Exquisite Nature of Grief	Carol Tyler	Fantagraphics	Finalist	
2026	A Garden of Spheres	Linnea Sterte	Peow2	Finalist	
2026	More Weight: A Salem Story	Ben Wickey	Top Shelf/IDW	Finalist	
2026	The Once and Future Riot	Joe Sacco	Metropolitan/Holt	Finalist	
2026	The Weight	Melissa Mendes	Drawn & Quarterly	Finalist	
