= Eisner Award for Best New Series =

American comic book award

Eisner Award for Best Limited Series
- Awarded for: Best New Series
- Country: United States
- First award: 1988
- Most recent winner: Assorted Crisis Events, by Deniz Camp and Eric Zawadski
- Website: www.comic-con.org/awards/eisner-awards/

The Eisner Award for Best New Series is an award for "creative achievement" in American comic books. First distributed in 1988 and 1989, it has been given out every year since 1995, expect for 2012.

== Winners and nominees ==
Year	Title	Creators	Publisher	Ref.
1980s
1988	Concrete	Paul Chadwick	Dark Horse	
1988	The American	Mark Verheiden, Chris Warner and Art Nichols	Dark Horse	
1988	Eddy Current	Ted McKeever	Mad Dog Graphics	
1989	Kings In Disguise	James Vance and Dan Burr	Kitchen Sink	
1989	Animal Man	Grant Morrison, Chas Truog and Doug Hazlewood	DC	
1989	Excalibur	Chris Claremont, Alan Davis and Paul Neary	Marvel	
1989	Maze Agency	Mike W. Barr, Adam Hughes and Rick Magyar	Comico	
1989	V For Vendetta	Alan Moore and David Lloyd	DC	
1990s
1990	There was no Eisner Award ceremony, or awards distributed, in 1990, due to widespread balloting mix-ups.			
1991-1995	The Eisner Award for Best New Series was not given these years			
1995	Too Much Coffee Man	Shannon Wheeler	Adhesive	
1995	Don Simpson's Bizarre Heroes	Don Simpson	Fiasco	
1995	Roarin' Rick's Rare Bit Fiends	Rick Veitch	King Hell	
1995	S. R. Bissette's Tyrant	Stephen R. Bissette	Spiderbaby Graphix	
1995	THB	Paul Pope	Horse Press	
1996	Kurt Busiek's Astro City	Kurt Busiek and Brent Anderson	Jukebox Productions/Image	
1996	Black Hole	Charles Burns	Kitchen Sink	
1996	The Book of Ballads and Sagas	Charles Vess and others	Green Man Press	
1996	Optic Nerve	Adrian Tomine	Drawn & Quarterly	
1996	Preacher	Garth Ennis and Steve Dillon	DC/Vertigo	
1996	Stray Bullets	David Lapham	El Capitan	
1997	Leave It to Chance	James Robinson and Paul Smith	Homage	
1997	Barry Windsor-Smith: Storyteller	Barry Windsor-Smith	Dark Horse	
1997	Coventry	Bill Willingham	Fantagraphics	
1997	Nowhere	Debbie Drechsler	Drawn & Quarterly	
1997	The Wretch	Phillip Hester and others	Caliber	
1998	Castle Waiting	Linda Medley	Olio	
1998	Lost Stories	John Riley, Garrett Berner, and Dave Sharpe	Creative Frontiers	
1998	Soulwind	C. Scott Morse	Image	
1998	Squee!	Jhonen Vasquez	Slave Labor	
1998	A Touch of Silver	Jim Valentino	Image	
1999	Inhumans	Paul Jenkins and Jae Lee	Marvel	
1999	Age of Bronze	Eric Shanower	Image	
1999	Colonia	Jeff Nicholson	Colonia Press	
1999	Lenore	Roman Dirge	Slave Labor	
1999	Young Justice	Peter David, Todd Nauck, and Lary Stucker	DC	
2000s
2000	Top Ten	Alan Moore, Gene Ha, and Zander Cannon	ABC	
2000	Louis Riel	Chester Brown	Drawn & Quarterly	
2000	100 Bullets	Brian Azzarello and Eduardo Risso	DC/Vertigo	
2000	Planetary	Warren Ellis and John Cassaday	DC/Wildstorm	
2000	Promethea	Alan Moore, J. H. Williams III, and Mick Gray	ABC	
2001	Powers	Brian Michael Bendis and Michael Avon Oeming	Image	
2001	Eagle	Kaiji Kawaguchi	Viz	
2001	Lucifer	Mike Carey and others	Vertigo/DC	
2001	The Red Star	Christian Gossett and Team Red Star	Image	
2002	Queen & Country	Greg Rucka and Steve Rolston	Oni	
2002	Private Beach	David Hahn	Slave Labor	
2002	Ruse	Mark Waid, Butch Guice, and Michael Perkins	CrossGen	
2002	The Sandwalk Adventures	Jay Hosler	Active Synapse	
2002	True Story, Swear to God	Tom Beland	Clib's Boy Comics	
2003	Fables	Bill Willingham, Lan Medina, Mark Buckingham, and Steve Leialoha	DC/Vertigo	
2003	Forlorn Funnies	Paul Hornschemeier	Absence of Ink	
2003	Gotham Central	Ed Brubaker, Greg Rucka, and Michael Lark	DC	
2003	Nowhere Girl	Justine Shaw	nowheregirl.com	
2003	Y: The Last Man	Brian K. Vaughan, Pia Guerra, and Jose Marzan	DC/Vertigo	
2004	Plastic Man	Kyle Baker	DC	
2004	El Cazador	Chuck Dixon and Steve Epting	CrossGen	
2004	Invincible	Robert Kirkman and Cory Walker	Image	
2004	The Losers	Andy Diggle and Jock	Vertigo/DC	
2004	Sleeper	Ed Brubaker and Sean Phillips	WildStorm/DC	
2004	The Walking Dead	Robert Kirkman and Tony Moore	Image	
2005	Ex Machina	Brian K. Vaughan, Tony Harris, and Tom Fesiter	WildStorm/DC	
2005	Astonishing X-Men	Joss Whedon and John Cassaday	Marvel	
2005	Doc Frankenstein	The Wachowskis and Steve Skroce	Burlyman	
2005	The Shaolin Cowboy	Geof Darrow	Burlyman	
2006	All Star Superman	Grant Morrison and Frank Quitely	DC	
2006	Desolation Jones	Warren Ellis and J. H. Williams III	WildStorm/DC	
2006	Fell	Warren Ellis and Ben Templesmith	Image	
2006	Rocketo	Frank Espinosa	Speakeasy	
2006	Young Avengers	Allan Heinberg, Jim Cheung, and John Dell	Marvel	
2007	Criminal	Ed Brubaker and Sean Phillips	Marvel Icon	
2007	East Coast Rising	Becky Cloonan	Tokyopop	
2007	Gumby	Bob Burden and Rick Geary	Wildcard	
2007	Jack of Fables	Bill Willingham, Matthew Sturges, Tony Akins, and Andrew Pepoy	Vertigo/DC	
2007	The Lone Ranger	Brett Matthews and Sergio Cariello	Dynamite	
2008	Buffy the Vampire Slayer, Season 8	Joss Whedon, Brian K. Vaughan, Georges Jeanty, and Andy Owens	Dark Horse	
2008	Immortal Iron Fist	Ed Brubaker, Matt Fraction, David Aja, and others	Marvel	
2008	Johnny Hiro	Fred Chao	AdHouse	
2008	The Infinite Horizon	Gerry Duggan and Phil Noto	Image	
2008	Scalped	Jason Aaron and R. M. Guera	Vertigo/DC	
2009	Invincible Iron Man	Matt Fraction and Salvador Larocca	Marvel	
2009	Air	G. Willow Wilson and M. K. Perker	Vertigo/DC	
2009	Echo	Terry Moore	Abstract Studio	
2009	Madame Xanadu	Matt Wagner, Amy Reeder Hadley, and Richard Friend	Vertigo/DC	
2009	Unknown Soldier	Joshua Dysart and Alberto Ponticelli	Vertigo/DC	
2010s
2010	Chew	John Layman and Rob Guillory	Image	
2010	Do Androids Dream of Electric Sheep?	Philip K. Dick, art by Tony Parker	BOOM	
2010	Ireedeemable	Mark Waid and Peter Krause	BOOM	
2010	Sweet Tooth	Jeff Lemire	Vertigo/DC	
2010	The Unwritten	Mike Carey and Peter Gross	Vertigo/DC	
2011	American Vampire	Scott Snyder, Stephen King, and Rafael Albuquerque	Vertigo/DC	
2011	iZombie	Chris Roberson and Michael Allred	Vertigo/DC	
2011	Marineman	Ian Churchill	Image	
2011	Morning Glories	Nick Spencer and Joe Eisma	Shadowline/Image	
2011	Superboy	Jeff Lemire and Pier Gallo	DC	
2012	The Eisner Award for Best New Series was not given this year			
2013	Saga	Brian K. Vaughan and Fiona Staples	Image	
2013	Adventure Time	Ryan North, Shelli Paroline, and Braden Lamb	kaboom!	
2013	Bandette	Paul Tobin and Colleen Coove	Monkeybrain	
2013	Fatale	Ed Brubaker and Sean Phillips	Image	
2013	Hawkeye	Matt Fraction and David Aja	Marvel	
2014	Sex Criminals	Matt Fraction and Chip Zdarsky	Image	
2014	High Crimes	Christopher Sebela and Ibrahim Moustafa	Monkeybrain	
2014	Lazarus	Greg Rucka and Michael Lark	Image	
2014	Rat Queens	Kurtis J. Wiebe and Roc Upchurch	Image/Shadowline	
2014	Watson and Holmes	Karl Bollers, Rick Leonardi, Paul Mendoza et al.	New Paradigm Studio	
2015	Lumberjanes	Shannon Watters, Grace Ellis, ND Stevenson, and Gus Allen	BOOM! Box	
2015	The Fade Out	Ed Brubaker and Sean Phillips	Image	
2015	Ms. Marvel	G. Willow Wilson and Adrian Alphon	Marvel	
2015	Rocket Raccoon	Skottie Young	Marvel	
2015	The Wicked + The Divine	Kieron Gillen and Jamie McKelvie	Image	
2016	Paper Girls	Brian K. Vaughan and Cliff Chiang	Image	
2016	Bitch Planet	Kelly Sue DeConnick and Valentine De Landro	Image	
2016	Harrow County	Cullen Bunn and Tyler Crook	Dark Horse	
2016	Kaijumax	Zander Cannon	Oni	
2016	Monstress	Marjorie Liu and Sana Takeda	Image	
2016	The Unbeatable Squirrel Girl	Ryan North and Erica Henderson	Marvel	
2017	Black Hammer	Jeff Lemire and Dean Ormston	Dark Horse	
2017	Clean Room	Gail Simone and Jon Davis-Hunt	Vertigo/DC	
2017	Deathstroke: Rebirth	Christopher Priest, Carlo Pagulayan, et al.	DC	
2017	Faith	Jody Houser, Pere Pérez, and Marguerite Sauvage	Valiant	
2017	Mockingbird	Chelsea Cain and Kate Niemczyk	Marvel	
2018	Black Bolt	Saladin Ahmed and Christian Ward	Marvel	
2018	Grass Kings	Matt Kindt and Tyler Jenkins	BOOM! Studios	
2018	Maestros	Steve Skroce	Image	
2018	Redlands	Jordie Bellaire and Vanesa Del Rey	Image	
2018	Royal City	Jeff Lemire	Image	
2019	Gideon Falls	Jeff Lemire and Andrea Sorrentino	Image	
2019	Bitter Root	David F. Walker, Chuck Brown, and Sanford Green	Image	
2019	Crowded	Christopher Sebela, Ro Stein, and Ted Brandt	Image	
2019	Isola	Brenden Fletcher and Karl Kerschl	Image	
2019	Man-Eaters	Chelsea Cain and Kate Niemczyk	Image	
2019	Skyward	Joe Henderson and Lee Garbett	Image	
2020s
2020	Invisible Kingdom	G. Willow Wilson and Christian Ward	Berger Books/Dark Horse	
2020	Doctor Doom	Christopher Cantwell and Salvador Larocca	Marvel	
2020	Once & Future	Kieron Gillen and Dan Mora	BOOM! Studios	
2020	Something Is Killing the Children	James Tynion IV and Werther Dell’Edera	BOOM! Studios	
2020	Undiscovered Country	Scott Snyder, Charles Soule, Giuseppe Camuncoli, and Daniele Orlandini	Image	
2021	Black Widow	Kelly Thompson and Elena Casagrande	Marvel	
2021	Crossover	Donny Cates and Geoff Shaw	Image	
2021	The Department of Truth	James Tynion IV and Martin Simmonds	Image	
2021	Killadelphia	Rodney Barnes and Jason Shawn Alexander	Image	
2021	We Only Find Them When They’re Dead	Al Ewing and Simone Di Meo	BOOM! Studios	
2022	The Nice House on the Lake	James Tynion IV and Álvaro Martínez Bueno	DC Black Label	
2022	The Human Target	Tom King and Greg Smallwood	DC	
2022	Not All Robots	Mark Russell and Mike Deodato Jr.	AWA Upshot	
2022	Radiant Black	Kyle Higgins and Marcelo Costa	Image	
2022	Ultramega	James Harren	Image Skybound	
2023	Public Domain	Chip Zdarsky	Image	
2023	The Atonement Bell	Jim Ousley and Tyler B. Ruff	Red 5	
2023	Love Everlasting	Tom King and Elsa Charretier	Image	
2023	Star Trek	Collin Kelly, Jackson Lanzing, and Ramon Rosanas	IDW	
2023	Traveling to Mars	Mark Russell and Roberto Meli	Ablaze	
2024	Somna: A Bedtime Story	Becky Cloonan and Tula Lotay	DSTLRY	
2024	Beneath the Trees Where Nobody Sees	Patrick Horvath	IDW	
2024	Black Cloak	Kelly Thompson and Meredith McClaren	Image	
2024	Local Man	Tim Seeley and Tony Fleecs	Image	
2024	Phantom Road	Jeff Lemire and Gabriel Hernández Walta	Image	
2025	Absolute Wonder Woman	Kelly Thompson and Hayden Sherman	DC	
2025	Absolute Batman	Scott Snyder and Nick Dragotta	DC	
2025	Minor Arcana	Jeff Lemire	BOOM! Studios	
2025	The Pedestrian	Joey Esposito and Sean Von Gorman	Magma Comix	
2025	The Power Fantasy	Kieron Gillen and Caspar Wijngaard	Image	
2025	Uncanny Valley	Tony Fleecs and Dave Wachter	BOOM! Studios	
2026	Assorted Crisis Events	Deniz Camp and Eric Zawadzki	Image	
2026	Batman Vol. 4	Matt Fraction and Jorge Jiménez	DC	
2026	Black Cat	G. Willow Wilson and Gleb Melnikov	Marvel	
2026	Exquisite Corpses	James Tynion IV, Michael Walsh, Pornsak Pichetshote, and others	Image	
2026	Ghost Pepper	Ludo Lullabi	Image	
2026	Temporal	Stephanie Williams and Asiah Fulmore	Mad Cave	
