= Ezra Claytan Daniels =

American graphic novelist and screenwriter

- Writing career
- Notable works: Upgrade Soul, BTTM FDRS
- Website: www.ezracdaniels.com

Ezra Claytan Daniels is an American comic book and television writer and artist. He is notable for the graphic novels Upgrade Soul, which won the Dwayne McDuffie Award for Diversity in Comics, and BTTM FDRS (with Ben Passmore), as well as his work on Doom Patrol, Night Sky, and Severance.

== Career ==
=== Graphic novels ===
==== Upgrade Soul ====
Upgrade Soul was originally serialized digitally as an IOS app before being published as a graphic novel by Lion Forge in 2018. It follows Hank and Molly Nonnar, an elderly couple who undergo an experiment procedure intended to restore their youth. However, the experiment instead results in a pair of clones of Hank and Molly, who have substantial physical disfigurements but are smarter and healthier than the originals, who attempt to coexist who along with them. The book won the 2017 Dwayne McDuffie Award for Diversity in Comics, and was nominated for the 2019 Harvey Award for Book of the Year and Eisner Award for Best Graphic Album — Reprint. The original app was designed by Eric Loyer.

In 2022, Upgrade Soul was adapted into a five-episode audio drama on Audible, starring Wendell Pierce, Marcia Gay Harden, and Phil LaMarr. The drama was named the 2022 Audible's Sci-Fi Audiobook of the Year.

A film based on Upgrade Soul is in development.

==== BTTM FDRS ====
BTTM FDRS (pronounced “bottomfeeders”) is a 2018 graphic novel collaboration with Ben Passmore, published by Fantagraphics. An Afrofuturist work, it follows Darla, a young new resident in Bottomyards, a community who faces strange biological monsters in a satire of gentrification.

==== Mama Came Callin' ====
Mama Came Callin' is a 2026 graphic novel illustrated by Camilla Sucre. It follow Kirah, a biracial woman whose white father was accused of being the Gator Man, a serial killer wearing an alligator mask who murdered Kirah's Black mother. When the Gator Man returns, Kirah is forced to confront her past.

=== Screenwriting ===
Daniels wrote the three episodes for Doom Patrol, including co-writing the series finale, "Done Patrol".

Daniels has upcoming writing credits for the third season of Severance and Shifter, a science fiction series by Hulu based on the graphic novel by Koren Shadmi. He is also the screenplay writer for Jordan Peele's in-development The People Under the Stairs reboot, having previously contributed to Peele's anthology Out There Screaming.

== Personal life ==
Daniels previously worked at a trial graphics company.

== Publications ==
- Daniels, Ezra Claytan (September 18, 2018). Upgrade Soul. Oni Press. ISBN 978-1549302923.
- Daniels, Ezra Claytan; Passmore, Ben (June 25, 2019). BTTM FDRS. Fantagraphics. ISBN 978-1683962069.
- Daniels, Ezra Claytan (October 3, 2023). "Pressure". Out There Screaming: An Anthology of New Black Horror. Edited by Jordan Peele. Random House. ISBN 978-0593243794.
- Daniels, Ezra Claytan (February 3, 2026). Mama Came Callin'. Illustrated by Camilla Sucre. William Morrow Paperbacks. ISBN 978-0063239562.

== Filmography ==
Year	Title	Notes
2014	The Gold Chain	Co-written with Adebukola Bodunrin
2021	Horror Noire	
2022	Night Sky	"Dear Franklin", co-written with Anne-Marie Hess
2021-2023	Doom Patrol	3 episodes (Note: Specifically "Bird Patrol", "Hope Patrol", and "Done Patrol", with "Done Patrol" being co-written with Shoshana Sachi)
Upcoming	Severance	Season 3
Upcoming	Shifter	
Upcoming	The People Under the Stairs reboot	

== Accolades ==
Year	Title	Award/Honor	Result	Ref.
2017	Upgrade Soul	Dwayne McDuffie Award for Diversity in Comics	Won	
2019	Upgrade Soul	Igntaz Award for Outstanding Artist	Nominated	
2019	Upgrade Soul	Igntaz Award for Outstanding Graphic Novel	Nominated	
2019	Upgrade Soul	Eisner Award for Best Graphic Album — Reprint	Nominated	
2019	Upgrade Soul	Harvey Award for Book of the Year	Nominated	
2019	Upgrade Soul	Ringo Award for Best Original Graphic Novel	Nominated	
2019	BTTM FDRS	Harvey Award for Book of the Year	Nominated	
2020	BTTM FDRS	Ringo Award for Best Original Graphic Novel	Nominated	
2020	BTTM FDRS	Igntaz Award for Outstanding Story	Nominated	
