= Upgrade Soul =

Graphic novel by Ezra Claytan Daniels

- Date: September 18, 2018
- Publisher: Lion Forge

Creative team
- Creator: Ezra Claytan Daniels
- ISBN: 978-1549302923

Upgrade Soul is a science fiction webcomic and graphic novel by Ezra Claytan Daniels. It follows an elderly couple who are confronted with clones of themselves after undertaking an experiment meant to restore their youth. Originally serialized digitally as an iOS app, it was rereleased as a print volume by Lion Forge in 2018.

== Plot ==
Hank Nonnar, the wealthy heir to a popular superhero franchise created by his father, and Molly Teel, a geneticist, are an elderly couple who are discontent with the legacies and aging bodies. On their 45th year of marriage, they elect to become the first human subjects for "Upgrade Soul", an experimental procedure meant to make themselves young again lead by researcher Kenton Kallose. The experiment goes wrong and stopped halfway through, leaving Hank and Molly weakened but alive, but also resulting in the creation of a pair of clones of Hank and Molly, whose appearances were radically altered by the procedure, including yellow skin, fishlike eyes, and large and earless bald heads, but have intellectual and physical capabilities that far exceed the originals. The clones, who take the names Henry and Manuela, develop distinct personalities from the original Hank and Molly despite sharing their memories, and Henry falls for Kallose's disabled sister Lina, who seeks freedom from her overbearing brother. While the originals and clones initially try to settle into an uneasy coexistence, they come to the realization that only one version of each person can live.

== Release ==
Upgrade Soul was originally serialized digitally as an iOS app designed by Eric Loyer starting in 2012.

In September 2018, Lion Forge republished the work as a print graphic novel.

In 2019, an updated version of the app was released, alongside a vinyl soundtrack by For Practically Everyone Records.

== Reception ==
Upgrade Soul received widespread positive reception upon its release. Leonard Pierce of The Comics Journal called the book "one of the rare works that yields deeper meaning each time it’s revisited, and where not a single panel of narrative is wasted." Rebecca Burke of Broken Frontier emphasized the work's philosophical nature and theme of identity in the narrative, while also noting how it addressed the topic of racism with an executive attempting to convince Hank to have a non-Black actor cast as his father's superhero.

Paste Magazine listed it as its #1 Sci-fi and Fantasy Comic of 2018, citing its themes of "mortality, aging, identity and the fundamental sense of self."

The book was included in several best comics or graphic novels of 2018 lists, including that of The Beat, Vulture, Publishers Weekly, and Library Journal.

== Accolades ==
Year	Award/Honor	Result	Ref.
2017	Dwayne McDuffie Award for Diversity in Comics	Won	
2019	Ignatz Awards for Outstanding Artist	Nominated	
2019	Igntaz Award for Outstanding Graphic Novel	Nominated	
2019	Eisner Award for Best Graphic Album — Reprint	Nominated	
2019	Harvey Award for Book of the Year	Nominated	
2019	Ringo Award for Best Original Graphic Novel	Nominated	

== Audio drama ==
In 2022, a five-episode audio drama was released based on the series by Audible. The drama starred Wendell Pierce, Marcia Gay Harden, and Phil LaMarr, and was named the 2022 Audible's Sci-Fi Audiobook of the Year.

== Film adaption ==
In 2018, a planned film adaption was announced.
