= Lighter Than My Shadow =

Graphic memoir by Katie Green

- Date: October 3, 2013 (UK); October 3, 2017 (US)
- Publisher: Jonathan Cape (UK); Lion Forge Comics (US)

Creative team
- Creator: Katie Green
- ISBN: 978-0224090988; 978-1941302415

Lighter Than My Shadow is a graphic memoir by Katie Green. It details Green’s experience with and recovery from anorexia. It was originally published in the United Kingdom in 2013, later being released in the United States in 2017.

== Summary ==
The book covers Green's history with her eating disorder, which started as issues with picky eating and rituals around food before evolving into anorexia when she was a teenager and continuing into her college years. It also deals with her abusive relationship with her therapist Jake, who initially seems to help her but is later revealed to have been molesting her.

== Reception ==
Both School Library Journal and Foreword Reviews gave Lighter Than My Shadow a starred review. Publishers Weekly stated that the book "never sugarcoats the difficult and ongoing nature of recovery," and noted the art's use of symbolic imagery such as black clouds representing Green's illness.

James Smart of The Guardian positively commented how the serious subject matter of Lighter Than My Shadow contrasted with the artstyle, and said that the book was at times "grimly repetitive" but overall "gripping."

Andy Oliver of Broken Frontier described the book as a "tour-de-force of graphic storytelling."

=== Accolades ===
Awards and honors
Year	Award	Result	Ref.
2018	Harvey Award for Book of the Year	Shortlisted	
2018	YALSA Award for Excellence in Nonfiction	Longlisted	
2018	Great Graphic Novels for Teens	Top Ten	
