= Killadelphia (comics) =

Image Comics series started in 2019

Publication information
- Publisher: Image Comics
- Schedule: Monthly
- Format: Miniseries

Creative team
- Written by: Rodney Barnes
- Artist: Jason Shawn Alexander

Killadephia is an urban vampire series written by Rodney Barnes with art by Jason Shawn Alexander, published starting in 2019 by Image Comics. The series follows a small-town beat cop who returns home to bury his murdered father and discovers that Vampires have always been present in the city.

Existing characters Spawn and Savage Dragon appear as part of the series.

== Reception ==
The series was nominated for the 2021 Eisner Award for Best New Series.

Jordan Peele cited it as "Killadelphia is the stunning and fresh horror fable I've been craving."
