= Josh Pettinger =

English cartoonist

- Born: Isle of Wight, England
- Area: Cartoonist
- Notable works: Goiter, Tedward
- Awards: Angoulême International Comics Festival Official Selection (2024)

Josh Pettinger is an English cartoonist and comic book artist based in the United States. He is best known as the creator of the indie comic book series Goiter and the character Tedward.

== Early life ==
Pettinger grew up on the Isle of Wight in England. He developed an interest in drawing at an early age and went on to study animation at university in London. While in London, he discovered American independent alternative comics, which prompted a pivot from animation toward comic book production.

== Career ==
After completing his studies, Pettinger relocated to Chicago, where he began writing and self-publishing Goiter, an ongoing anthology comic series characterized by dark humor and surreal social satire. He later relocated to Philadelphia and San Francisco.

In 2024, the French release of Goiter was named an Official Selection at the Angoulême International Comics Festival. Pettinger has also collaborated with cartoonist Simon Hanselmann on projects within the Megg, Mogg & Owl universe, including the Werewolf Jones & Sons Summer Fun Annual.

== Bibliography ==
=== Series and Collections ===
- Goiter (2024, Floating World Comics, ISBN 1942801637)
- Tedward (2025, Fantagraphics, ISBN 9798875000539)
  - Collects self-published comics Power Wash (2022), Tedward Classic Movies (2023), Warm Television (2023), Best Regards (2023), and Tracy Island (2024)
- Pleasure Beach #1-3 (2025–present), ongoing self-published comic series
- Work Release: A Tedward Classic Movie (2026, self-published)

=== Collaborations ===
- Werewolf Jones & Sons Summer Fun Annual (2022, with Simon Hanselmann)
- Werewolf Jones & Sons Autumnal Grievance Spectacular (2022, with Simon Hanselmann)
- Werewolf Jones & Sons Deluxe Summer Fun Annual (2023, with Simon Hanselmann, Fantagraphics, ISBN 9781683967712)
- Quality Pictures (2023, anthology edited with Simon Hanselmann)
- Now: The New Comics Anthology #13 (2024, Fantagraphics, contributed short story, ISBN 9781683969631)

== Accolades ==
- 2024: Angoulême International Comics Festival – Official Selection (for Goiter)
