= RASL =

2013 graphic novel written by Jeff Smith

- Cover of the first issue.

Publication information
- Publisher: Cartoon Books (self-published)
- Schedule: Bimonthly, originally 3 issues annually, typically delayed
- Format: Limited series
- Genre: SciFi, Noir
- Publication date: February 2008 – August 2012
- No. of issues: 15
- Main character(s): RASL; Miles Riley; Maya Riley

Creative team
- Created by: Jeff Smith
- Written by: Jeff Smith
- Artist: Jeff Smith

Collected editions
- Volume 1: The Drift: ISBN 978-1-888963-20-5
- Volume 2: Fire of St. George: ISBN 9781888963229
- Volume 3: Romance at the Speed of Light: ISBN 9781888963335
- Volume 4: The Lost Journals of Nikola Tesla: ISBN 978-1-888-96332-8
- RASL color collected edition: ISBN 978-1-888963-37-3

RASL is a science fiction noir comic book series written and illustrated by Jeff Smith, originally self-published by Cartoon Books in 15 issues between 2008 and 2012. The story follows RASL (Dr. Robert Joseph Johnson), an art thief who jumps to parallel universes in attempts to steal famous paintings, whose activity attract the attention of a government organization.

RASL draws influences from real-life events, people, and places, including Nikola Tesla, Southwestern Native American culture, and hardboiled crime fiction. The book's central storyline is narrated extensively through the protagonist's thoughts, aided by the use of flashbacks to tell the story of his past. Smith's art style is high-contrast black-and-white, and is notably more detailed and "human" than his previous work Bone.

RASL originally appeared in serial form in an independently published black-and-white comic book published from 2008 to 2012.

== Development ==
Jeff Smith has stated that RASL came from a desire to do something completely different from his previous work Bone. He came up with the idea in 1999 during the process of inking Bone, inspired by his thoughts of how films like Blade Runner and the Bourne film series could come together. Smith then talked to cartoonists Paul Pope and Frank Miller about the idea and gained support. Smith postponed his idea on RASL as to complete Bone, and came back to it in 2007. He developed an idea of how the story would end and what would happen but needed to organize it into a full-fledged story. He flew out to Arizona, as he knew the story would be set in the desert. He found the quiet and heat helped him develop his ideas for the story and characters. Smith was also interested in the visual aspects of film noir, such as intense angles, heavy shadows, and a sense of discomfort. He then spent a year researching the latest in the theories of physics, M-theory, and string theory from the work of Brian Greene, Stephen Hawking, and Carl Sagan to get a feel of what scientists believe is happening with parallel worlds. In a 2014 interview with Planète BD, Smith cited Dashiell Hammett and Raymond Chandler as influences on the series' hardboiled detective fiction elements. He also discussed the difficulty of writing within the genre's limited narrative perspective, while incorporating scientific research as well as conspiracy theories surrounding Nikola Tesla.

== Publication history ==
Self-published through Smith's publishing company Cartoon Books, the first issue of RASL was released in February 2008. Originally planned for three issues a year at 32 pages, the format was changed as of issue #5 to 24 pages (22 pages of comics, and a two-page letter column titled "RASLetters") for less wait in between. Issue #6 was delayed for an extensively long time, from October 2009 to January 2010. According to creator Jeff Smith's blog, the series was to go bimonthly with issue #7.

Earlier in the series' production, it was unclear whether RASL was supposed to be a limited series or a standard ongoing series. In response to a fan's post on Smith's Facebook page on August 1, 2010, he commented: "I'm not sure how many issues there will be exactly, but you'll probably only have to be collecting RASL for about two more years", confirming that it was in fact an ongoing series, and that Smith estimated the series to end somewhere between 2012 and 2013. Smith hinted in the "RASLetters" section of issue #10 that either issue #15 or #16 would be the final issue of the series. Ultimately, the series ended with issue #15 in August 2012.

=== Release dates ===
- Issue #1 - February 27, 2008
- Issue #2 - June 18, 2008
- Issue #3 - October 15, 2008
- Issue #4 - April 29, 2009
- Issue #5 - July 15, 2009
- Issue #6 - January 20, 2010
- Issue #7 - March 31, 2010
- Issue #8 - July 20, 2010
- Issue #9 - November 24, 2010
- Issue #10 - April 20, 2011
- Issue #11 - July 6, 2011
- Issue #12 - October 25, 2011
- Issue #13 - February 2012
- Issue #14 - May 30, 2012
- Issue #15 - August 1, 2012

== Plot synopsis ==
The following synopses are cited directly from the collected editions of RASL, respectively.

=== Chapter 1 – The Drift ===
RASL, a dimension-jumping art thief with a tattoo of a woman's name (Maya) on his left arm, wanders in a desert, battered and bloody. He recollects his memories on a job where he steals the Picasso painting The Old Guitarist. After tagging the location of the painting, RASL escapes from the police by using an immersion suit (resembling 4 airplane turbines strapped to his shoulders and legs and an African mask) to enter "The Drift", a place where he is able to travel to other dimensions.

He comes to a seemingly regular world and hides his suit, then visits a bar. While looking through the songs on the jukebox, he notices that Bob Dylan's Blonde on Blonde album is instead credited to Robert Zimmerman, and realizes he is in the wrong place. An assassin with a lizard-like face comes in and shoots at RASL; as he escapes, his painting is shot.

The assassin chases RASL, but he beats and disarms the man. He finds no I.D. and is startled to see a small rectangle block in the man's wrist. Hearing sirens, he decides to go find a quiet place to meditate for a couple of hours (to be put in a more zen-like state of purity so he may enter the Drift again). He muses that someone would "figure it out eventually" and that "It's never too late to fix it".

=== Chapter 2 – Annie ===
RASL returns to the real world and visits his client, a prostitute named Annie, at her house. She notices RASL is in bad shape, and asks if he was "time traveling again". He corrects her by explaining that he jumps dimensions using "thermo-magnetic engines to bend the space" around him. Annie notices the painting was shot in the foot and she can never show it to anyone. RASL asks if Annie has seen the lizard face assassin, mentioning he was from "The Compound". It is revealed that under the assassin's wrist was a security chip. She has not seen the man. RASL is frustrated that "they" are unable to control him, so they sent an assassin.

Annie shows him a medallion depicting "The Man in the Maze" (a nickname for the I'itoi) which represents the journey of life and its turning points. RASL thinks about how while he is in the void, there are portals, and he goes through the one he sees. Annie believes that worlds also choose him. Later, the two have sex and fall asleep. RASL wakes up later worried that he might be in the wrong place, and RASL decides to go out and drink.

He returns later to find that Annie has been murdered. RASL knows he must go after the assassin and gets his jeep. As he drives past The Compound he recalls when he first played with magnets and learned Maxwell's equations to make his immersion suit. He asserts that "nothing is certain in the world of quantum physics". He gives an example of this by stating how electrons are not able to be pinned down in an atom. He narrates: "I can't remember where I heard the theory that these particles were actually leaking into other dimensions. But I can remember the first time I followed one". He then burns the Picasso painting and uses his immersion suit to enter The Drift.

=== Chapter 3 – Maya ===
RASL re-enters the world where "Dylan isn't Dylan" and, with his jeep gone, he walks into town. At a bus stop he sees the Man in the Maze symbol used as an ad for a Maze of Life exhibit for a museum. He meets a shady character who introduces himself as "The President of the Street" and pays him 40 dollars for his help in finding a vehicle. Soon after, RASL begins his drive to the museum (during this we learn that he counts while drifting so he can focus and not black out). Blacking out is how he came to the current dimension the first time. Assuming Annie's killer is following him, he wonders how he got the technology but admits it wouldn't be hard to master, but he mentions that two people saw his (RASL's) complete designs, and that one of them is dead.

The story flashes back to when he worked for The Compound (a military base). He works with a man named Miles and his wife Maya. RASL's name is revealed to be Robert, and that he and his partners are working on a "St. George Array" (based on ideas by Nikola Tesla). According to Miles it's an anti weapon which serves as a barrier against missiles. RASL feels reluctant going through with the plans, but Miles points out that in the past he supported Robert's teleportation suits (t-suits). At this time, however, they do not function properly. The phone rings and Miles answers the call and tells them the project has now been green-lit and the budget doubled. While he gets a bottle of champagne Maya kisses RASL saying "Even if you could leave him, I know you can't leave me" (indicating an affair between them). Maya tells Miles Robert won't back out, leaving Robert himself unsure of the future.

In the museum he meets the curator who looks exactly like Maya who in this dimension doesn't know him (instead her name is Uma Giles). After showing her the silver medallion to examine she says it looks like Hopi silverwork, though his “friend” (Annie) was part Pima. He leaves the museum shortly after making plans to meet her again, reeling from the experience. He decides to visit Annie's house. As RASL is about to leave (after watching a client walk out of her house), the assassin with the lizard like face pulls up in a car to come kill her. RASL enters and sees the man has her hostage and greets him by his first name telling him: "You have something that belongs to us and we want it back".

RASL takes the gun and points it at the assassin but is startled when the assassin says that there are infinitely many different Annie's but only one of he and Robert. A brutal fight ensues while Annie picks up the gun and aims it at both of them. The assassin runs outside while RASL makes sure Annie is ok. Outside, the assassin (with his own immersion suit) enters The Drift. RASL prepares to do the same telling Annie to get to safety. She asks where he is going, to which he replies "After him!" He enters the Drift, leaving this dimension's Annie with the gun, in awe and bewildered.

=== Chapter 4 – Opening Doors ===
The story opens with RASL declaring himself a liar, in a world filled with liars. And that even a liar can find it difficult to tell what is truth and what is legend. During this, a boat spots a life raft holding a dead (and possibly mutated) sailor. It is learned that this is 6 days prior to the Philadelphia Experiment, which is narrated as follows:

In September 1943, a military convoy is leaving from Casablanca bound for Norfolk Virginia via the Atlantic (waters patrolled by German submarines in this era). As the ships pass within 100 miles from Bermuda, an immense flash is seen on the horizon, followed by the muffled sounds of depth charges. A distress call is picked up yet no ships or German subs are seen. 2 days pass and the calls and noises persist. The next day, the dead sailor is found. On the sixth night, a loud succession of explosions is heard and an unknown ship is seen with its stern on fire. Alarm is issued and the traveling boat goes to rescue the other. As they approach, it is gone and not seen nor detected on radar. Going further, the sailors look down into a trench in the shape of a hull. A loud pop of electricity is heard and the sailors look shocked at what is described as "a man-made horror/a travesty of nature". RASL narrates that this incident is the beginning of a series of lies that leads to the current point in his story. A quiet barrio in Tucson.

Re-emerging from the Drift once more in a new dimension with the assassin, another brutal fight ensues at night in the street in a suburb area. The assassin draws his gun and points it at RASL, warning him to stay put. He looks at RASL, stating he looks nothing like his picture (addressing him by his full name, Robert Joseph Johnson). He notices drifting is killing him. The assassin asks if RASL came to "return the stolen property", but RASL has come only because of Annie's murder. The assassin warns RASL that he is meddling with forces he can't control, and that none of the worlds RASL visits are real, which is why he has never met himself. The assassin then reveals his name as Sal, that he is working for the Compound, and that they believe RASL has 2 journals stolen from the navy. He offers a truce for the journals in exchange for not killing RASL's "girlfriends" for 48 hours. RASL tries to make a grab for him but falls on the street, as Sal teleports away. Suddenly, he notices a very eerie and silent little girl who disappears quickly.

He goes to a nearby bar to drink and collect his thoughts. We learn through this that Nikola Tesla was working on magnetic fields for ships to detect German ships and repel mines during World War I. The assistant secretary of the navy at the time is Franklin Delano Roosevelt. FDR becomes president and discusses the magnetic project with Albert Einstein during the period of the Manhattan Project during World War II. RASL had seen the data of a full-scale test in which a ship blinked in and out of existence several times over 6 days; the experiment had horrific results, making the navy want to "close that door". However, RASL says he opened it again 2 years ago.

He walks out of the bar and sees the eerie girl again, who slaps the ground where he appeared and points to Annie's house. Unsure of what to make of this, RASL puts on his suit and returns once more to the dimension with no Bob Dylan. Checking on Annie, he is worried she doesn't know who he is. She addresses him as Robert, assures him and kisses him. As they do this, RASL slowly shuts the door of her house.

=== Chapter 5 – Uma ===
The story continues the morning after Annie and RASL have sex with Annie expressing her disbelief and amazement at RASL's explanation of his drifting technology. His first test was done in a desert of Arizona (where the story takes place) and it took 3 days to realize he was on another world. Knowing that this dimension's Annie saw the suit, Robert plans to leave to pull a new heist to get money while Annie can go somewhere safe. Annie questions RASL about her alternate versions RASL has seen or slept with. Asking why RASL wants to be with her, he simply says it is because they both are there. Keeping in mind that he destroyed The Compound's multibillion-dollar weapons division, he plans to not give the journals to them. Rob leaves, bloody and hurt from Drifting and has a short black out before and during driving.

During the second blackout the story flashes back to Robert coming back in the lab looking ill (the mask of his immersion suit is seen hanging on the wall amongst other objects). RASL confesses that he tested a t-suit, that it worked, and expresses his want to postpone the St. George Array test (and shut down the Tesla Division) to analyze the calculations of his trip. Miles expresses his frustration and wonders if anything has to do with Robert and Maya's trip to Wright-Patterson Air Force Base in Dayton, Ohio. Afterward, Miles picks up the phone and tells RASL to stick to a story, and that the head of security is arriving.

After the blackout, he pulls over and starts walking and sees the strange girl from Chapter 4 holding hands with a woman on the sidewalk (this is the second world he has seen her). Shortly, Maya (the Uma version) drives up to give him a ride to the museum to get his necklace (which Annie gave him). She offers him a private tour. During the drive, the story flashes back to Robert and Maya having sex during the Wright Patt trip (confirming Miles' suspicions). Maya confesses she wishes to be with Robert all the time. They discuss their schedule which includes a research meeting and another meeting with H.A.A.R.P. to discuss Maya's bio-theories on low frequencies. RASL plans to go to the archives to check out U.F.O. conspiracies.

The story returns to RASL staring at Maya as she gives a tour, and notices he isn't listening, smiling seductively. The story then flashes back to when RASL meets Alvin Bester, a man who works in the archives. He tells RASL of his reputation he's been building and also reminds him of his desire to shut down the Tesla Division. Bester gives RASL Nikola Tesla's 2 missing journals. RASL has a look of shock and fright upon reading one of the journals. The story flashes back to Maya and RASL embraced, kissing in the museum.

=== Chapter 6 – The Mad Scientist ===
The story continues after the date with Maya with RASL reflecting on his and Miles' fascination with the life of Nikola Tesla and his "electrification" of the world. His exposition includes Tesla's relationship and rivalry with Thomas Edison, which leads into a further explanation of the war of the currents. Halfway through this, RASL is seen breaking into a parallel version of the penthouse from Chapter 1 to obtain a new Old Guitarist painting.

He continues his story of Tesla by emphasizing that he felt electricity was a life force, and made plans to create wireless energy transmissions in a laboratory in the Colorado Rockies. The story then goes back to RASL to show that his job was successful as he receives pay from the owner of a casino (who allows RASL to go and enjoy it). The story jumps back into a further narration of Tesla's competition, specifically Guglielmo Marconi. Meanwhile, the company which Tesla and his partner George Westinghouse ran was in financial trouble, but Tesla temporarily saved it. The story goes to the present in the real world to a scene where RASL brings the painting to his friend Pauly in a casino office. Pauly gives RASL a free pass to enjoy the casino. RASL continues his recollection of Tesla.

Ultimately the residents in the area of Tesla's lab grew tired of the thunder being emitted, and he left to go meet J.P. Morgan. After working for Morgan, he is abandoned for Marconi (being that he became the first to transmit signals over the Atlantic Ocean). RASL for a moment sympathizes with Tesla but lets his story serve as a cautionary tale as he sits at a poker table with a drink. Sal approaches him from behind to confront him, questioning him as to why he does not have the journals. After realizing the casino set him up (because security isn't called to his aid), RASL tries to fight Sal drunk, but is smashed over the head with the butt of his gun.

=== Chapter 7 – Brighter Than the Sun ===
The story continues with RASL narrating The Tunguska Event, expressing his belief that Nikola Tesla's attempt at putting his world system on line was the cause. The story then flashes back to The Compound. Robert and Miles' friendship has fallen apart with Robert having left the St. George project but persistent in advising Miles not to test the weapon. Miles is skeptical at RASL's warnings, seeing that he had, without authorization, taken the t-suit and accidentally discovered other worlds. During an exchange, RASL reveals his knowledge of the existence of Tesla's journals. Miles, infuriated that RASL had kept them secret, throws a laptop through a window, ranting in an almost madness-driven manner. Maya comes in worried to break up the fight, to which Miles (reading Robert and Maya's faces) realizes their affair. RASL is taken out of the building by security, stating that after seven years of research, his time at The Compound was done. Three days before the St. George test, however, Robert returns to take his t-suit and drifts, conscious of it for the first time (and jamming the array in the process). Because of the electromagnetic effects drifting and a guilty conscience, RASL develops a drinking habit.

He wakes up in the present after the confrontation with Sal in the casino office from Chapter 6 (located in Las Vegas). Present in the room is Sal, along with Kalani Adams, the security head of the compound. Sal's full name is revealed as Salvador Crow, and that he has undergone training under the authority of The Department of Homeland Security. Also, he is part of a "watchdog group" created by the Patriot Act. In conversation with Kalani, it is learned the department considers the new worlds (if real) a potential security risk. RASL expresses that they are real, to which Sal is disgusted by the thought of considering that so. The St. George array is being rebuilt. RASL reveals his t-suit works because energy is shared in all the universes and that energy is transferred. In addition he states the barrier is thin and trying to create the St. George weapon is ill-advised, because an energy gusher could be opened up causing devastating consequences. Choosing to see this as a way to convince RASL to bring her the journals, Kalani offers an ultimatum to bring them in 24 hours or be locked away.

RASL is taken away by Sal and tossed out on the edge of town, telling him that he is still seeking out Annie. RASL's narration of the past is further revealed as he states that three days after jamming the weapon, he drifted back to Tucson and rented a jeep, knowledgeable of where he hid the journals. After driving out of town, he recalls seeing a flash in the mirror, and witnesses (along with other drivers who had gotten out of their cars) a devastating explosion from The Compound. The story flashes back to the present one last time with RASL standing in the desert where Sal left him, with the eerie girl he'd met earlier right behind him.

=== Chapter 8 – Romance at the Speed of Light ===
The story picks up right from the end of the last chapter with RASL reflecting back on his motto, "It's never too late to fix it". He thinks back to a warning that Annie gave him - that he is an addictive personality and would run back to Maya, even if her motives seemed suspect. A flash to a new scene is seen in which Robert breaks off the affair with Maya (much to her dismay), then jumps to RASL watching the news after the explosion at the Compound (talked about at the end of Chapter 7). The entire team which includes Miles is rescued, but not Maya. RASL gets a tattoo in her memory. Two years later in the present, RASL realizes that the eerie little girl is standing behind him.

RASL tries to communicate with the girl and see if she followed him from a parallel universe, but she motions for RASL to take off his jacket, and then crosses out Maya's name on his arm (to RASL's confusion). She then draws a diagram in the dirt which shocks RASL, as he backs away he bumps into The President of the Street, who recognizes RASL from their last meet (in Chapter 3) despite them not being in the world in which they met. RASL asks if the man knows who the little girl is, and he states that she is God.

=== Chapter 9 – The Warning ===
RASL contemplates God, existence and the origins of the universe through various Native American myths and stories. Included is a visual reference to the Man in the Maze who is described as "Elder Brother". RASL walks in the desert to town, along with The President of the Streets and the little girl (who he claims that she is a God). The President is recalling a story of how he saw a UFO when RASL stops momentarily to question the man's claim of the little girl being God. When The President makes references to Nikola Tesla and his downfall, RASL suddenly takes hold of the man angrily, and the little girl calms him down.

RASL explains to her that the drawing she made in the sand in the previous chapter is from Tesla's journals. The diagram/drawing makes reference to his Unified Field Theory which explains the ideas of dimensions and universes overlapping, along with shared energy. RASL explains that in order to tap into those dimensions, high frequencies of energy are needed, which would crack a hole in reality itself (which he states is what happened in The Philadelphia Experiment). He also worries that that is exactly what will happen if the St. George array is activated.

RASL decides to go and get Annie like he planned (after he'd side-tracked in Las Vegas in Chapter 6) and The President and the girl seem to vanish. RASL goes to a parking garage to pick up his Jeep and finds a figure going through his trunk, dressed in a T-Suit. He chases the figure, and is positive it isn't Sal (because of the person's dexterity and height). He almost catches the figure but they drift out of his reach with the T-Suit engines. RASL muses that he'll have to keep his Jeep locked up.

== Characters ==
Dr. Robert Joseph Johnson/"RASL"
The main character of the series.

Salvador "Sal" Crow/"The Lizard-Faced Man"
An assassin working for The Compound who tried to kill RASL, which sets the initial present story in motion.

Annie
A sex worker and somewhat of a girlfriend of RASL. She seemed to have some knowledge of the Compound and held a relationship with RASL (providing spiritual guidance for him at one point). She is killed in the real world, but an Annie from the world with no Bob Dylan is saved but left bewildered at the events of what happened. She is later visited again by RASL and now knows of his technology and identity. RASL made plans for her to leave her home should he not return at a certain point from pulling a new heist. She is part Pima.

Miles Riley
A scientist and childhood friend whom RASL worked with in the past (appearing in flashbacks) who helped work to make a St. George Array, and was frustrated at RASL's reluctance to go through with the project. From the flashbacks it could be inferred that he and RASL had frequent disagreements because of this. It is revealed in Chapter 7 that Miles was caught in an explosion after attempting to go through with the St. George Array test without the proper equipment and knowledge to do so, resulting in a blast which destroyed the building. Chapter 8, however, reveals that he was apparently found, though his condition was left a mystery.

Maya Riley
Miles' wife whom RASL was having an affair with at the time he was working with them. She appears in a flashback with Miles in Chapter 3 and again in Chapter 5 where she and RASL are on a trip to Wright-Patt. An alternate version exists whose name is Uma Giles working as a museum curator, to whom RASL visits again on a date. She was also caught in the St George's explosion, but no trace was found of her.

"The Spooky Little Girl"
A nameless, eerie little girl that RASL begins to notice following him beginning in Chapter 4. She is short, wide-eyed, and wears rather ragged clothes and has a fearful and almost mindless expression on her face most times. In Chapter 8, The President of the Street says that she is God.

"The President of the Street"
A homeless, shady character who appeared in Chapter 3 (only in the collection The Drift, not the individual issue). He is characterized by his knowledge of the streets, as his name suggests, and accepts money to do favors for people. He reappears in Chapter 8, recognizing RASL (though this time, it is in a different world) and seems to be friends with The Spooky Little Girl, stating that she is God.

== Reception ==
Reviewers have praised the graphic novel as tightly written and ambitious, its art distinct, emotional and noir aspects as tense. However, troubling portrayal of women and their unchanged positions as noir caricatures is also singled out.

In 2014, RASL won the Eisner Award for Best Graphic Album - Reprint, for the collected edition published by Cartoon Books.

== Collected editions ==
RASL has been collected into the following oversized (10" by 12") trade paperbacks:

#	Title	Release date	Collected material	ISBN
1	The Drift	January 7, 2009	RASL #1–3	978-1-888-96320-5
2	The Fire of St. George	April 28, 2010	RASL #4–7	978-1-888-96322-9
3	Romance at the Speed of Light	November 30, 2011	RASL #8–11	978-1-888-96333-5
4	The Lost Journals of Nikola Tesla	August 14, 2012	RASL #12–15	978-1-888-96332-8

The collection of The Drift has been released in a hardcover edition (ISBN 978-1888963212), limited to 3000 copies. The collection of The Drift also features extra story pages along with bonus material.

The series is also being released in "Pocket Book" format (measuring 8.9 by 6.4 by 0.6 inches). Due to the release of these, the previous oversized collected editions were renamed the RASL Giant Artist Editions. It has been confirmed that despite the release of the pocket books, the RASL Giant Artist Editions will be kept in print and continued. Smith said in the RASLetters of Issue #10 that there would be either one or two more RASL Giant Artist Editions (if one, then the one would contain more pages than usual, while if two, they may contain less pages than usual), while there will be one more RASL Pocket Book Edition:

#	Title	Release date	Collected material	ISBN
1	Pocket Book One	November 1, 2010	RASL #1–7	978-1-888-96324-3

The entire series was colored by Steve Hamaker and collected as a single 472 page hardcover in September 2013 (ISBN 978-1-888963-37-3). In a 2013 interview with The Comics Journal, Smith explained that he considered the color edition the definitive version because of the lighting effects achieved.

== Film adaptation ==
In March 2011, RASL has been optioned for a film by Lionel Wigram.
