= Beneath the Trees Where Nobody Sees: Rite of Spring =

2025 comic book by Patrick Horvath

Beneath The Trees Where Nobody Sees: Rite of Spring
- No. of issues: 6
- Publisher: IDW Publishing

Creative team
- Letterer: Hassan Otsmane-Elhaou
- Creator: Patrick Horvath
- ISBN: 979-8887243849

Chronology
- Preceded by: Beneath the Trees Where Nobody Sees

Beneath the Trees Where Nobody Sees: Rite of Spring is a six-issue comic book miniseries by Patrick Horvath. It is the sequel to his 2024 series Beneath the Trees Where Nobody Sees, taking place eight years later in the 1990s, and has Sam confront Monica Brewer, the sister of one of her victims, luring her to her town as part of a plot to reveal her true nature to the world.

== Plot ==
In 1994, life in Woodbrook, VT has been mostly peaceful since local mouse resident Nigel Albright murdered his mother and their neighbors. But he was also secretly framed by a brown bear and serial killer named Samantha "Sam" Strong to cover up her own crimes. Sam now only murders sporadically to avoid getting herself exposed on the internet and stores her latest victims' remains in the American factories that have been abandoned due to companies moving production to China. A turtle resident named Bertie learns that the murders are the first things to show up when Woodbrook is searched online.

Meanwhile, a duck named Monica Brewer has been searching for her younger brother, Daniel, unaware that he was killed by Sam. Monica has been living and working the past eight years in the same city where Daniel was last seen, and had given her telephone number to the local authorities to call her if they find him. She frequently searches on the internet for clues to her brother's whereabouts and one night receives a message telling to travel to Woodbrook. Borrowing her dog friend and coworker George's car, Monica drives to Woodbrook.

Woodbrook's bloodhound Sheriff Patterson gives Monica a jacket that belonged to Daniel, but tells her the police lack the budget needed to scour the whole forest for the rest of her brother's remains. Monica then meets Sam, who reveals she is the one who has invited Monica to Woodbrook. When Sam offers to help Monica, the duck accepts the offer unaware of the brown bear's murderous side. Recent land development has caused local wildlife to enter the village, prompting the police to euthanize a wild bear to stop it from hurting anyone.

At the library, Monica reads news reports about Nigel and Sam, and a patron tells her to ask Sam's mole assistant Lewis Burrow. The Burrow family has been trying to move on since its patriarch Charlie's death at the hands of Nigel: Wendy is in university; Lewis is still in school and works part-time for Sam; their mother, Pauline, has been depressed and her prescription abuse has caused her to perform so poorly at her job that her employer has threatened to fire her the next time she is late or absent.

A flashback reveals that Sam started murdering since graduating from university. And although she usually murders outsiders, among Sam's first victims were her own parents, who were the previous owners of the hardware store; Sam lied that her parents retired to Florida and she took over the family business.

Lewis answers Monica's questions about Sam, to whom is grateful for all the brown bear has done for the Burrow family. Sam gives Monica a tour of Woodbrook and tells her that the clues to Daniel's remains are in a box left by Nigel. The Albright family's house is now inhabited by a koala family consisting of Michael, his wife Carol, and their baby Ricky. Sam has Monica pretend to be a county office employee and the duck tricks the koalas into letting her in their home while Sam waits outside. Monica discovers Nigel's box in the baby's room and sends Michael tumbling down the stairs after the koalas accuse her of hiding drugs. The box contains maps of the forest and Sam and Monica go there with a metal detector. However, Monica discovers via pencil shading Sam's name and drives away with the evidence after realizing Sam murdered Daniel. Sam gets into her own car and chases after Monica, only to be injured by Pauline, who has been driving under the influence of her prescription to avoid getting fired.

The next day, the police and Monica confront Sam. Before the police could arrest Sam, however, she reveals that she had rigged Woodbrook with concealed guns and flammable gas in case she gets exposed. Across the town, the police and several civilians get killed as Sam knocks Monica unconscious and ties her up in the back of the hardware store.

Sam then sets the building on fire and leaves Monica to burn to death. She then kills her owl neighbor, Howard Gherkins, (Note: Howard's pig wife, Cherry, was killed by Nigel in the previous graphic novel) to steal his car. Lewis tearfully confronts Sam over her crimes before he reunites with his family while Bertie rescues the elderly inhabitants of the local retirement center. As the survivors of Sam's rampage evacuate, she flees Woodbrook and gains many fans.

== Release ==
The first issue was released on July 9, 2025. A hardcover containing all six issues was announced in March 2026.

== Reception ==
The series received largely positive reception. David Brooke of AIPT Comics reviewed the series. For the final issue, he praised the contrast between Samantha's brutality and the townsfolk's willingness to help each other, but found Monica's final fate to be unsatisfying. Ricardo Serrano Denis of The Beat praised the first issue, comparing it to Blacksad and describing it as a different, "uglier and more fatalistic" follow-up to the original series. Comic Book Club remarked on how the first issue largely excludes Samantha in favor of building up new protagonist Monica.

The series was nominated for the 2026 Eisner Award for Best Limited Series. Additionally, letterer Hassan Otsmane-Elhaou won the 2026 Eisner Award for Best Lettering in part for his work on the miniseries.
