= Polarity (company) =

American media company (2018–present)

Polarity LTD
- Industry: Media
- Founded: 2018
- Founder: David Steward, II
- Headquarters: St. Louis, Missouri, and Portland, Oregon, United States
- Key people: David Steward II (CEO); Edward Hamati (President)
- Products: Illustrated Syndicate; The Lion Forge LLC; Neon Metropolis; Oni Press
- Number of employees: 19
- Website: polarityltd.com

Polarity LTD is an American media company founded in 2018 by David Steward II. In 2019, it became the parent company of Oni–Lion Forge Publishing Group which was created by the merger/acquisition of comic book publishers The Lion Forge LLC and Oni Press. The company also owns the music label Neon Metropolis and formerly owned the comics magazine The Beat.

Its name conveys opposing forces and a global perspective to build a captivating range of assets. As a media company, Polarity is focused on investing in, and distributing new content to the global marketplace.

== History ==
In 2018, David Steward II, co-founder of Lion Forge Comics, founded the media company Polarity "to help develop Lion Forge characters outside comics". OPB reported that Lion Forge "quietly rolled out" Polarity "as a holding company and investment platform for animation and other pop culture content products".

On May 8, 2019, Oni Press announced a merger with Lion Forge Comics with the merger negotiated by Polarity. Newsarama reported that "in March 2019, Oni was the 10th ranked publisher on Diamond's Direct Market market share chart with 0.74% in dollar share and 9th in unit share with 0.64%. Lion Forge was not ranked in the top 10". The two companies merged into the Oni–Lion Forge Publishing Group (OLFPG) and became a subsidiary of Polarity. Oni Press and Lion Forge remained as imprint labels. Publishers Weekly reported that "Polarity president Ed Hamati oversaw the merger as well as the consolidation of companies under Polarity. Polarity will manage a newly constituted roster of pop culture content companies that include Lion Forge Animation, the Neon Metropolis music label, and comics news and culture website The Beat". Joe Nozemack stepped down as president of Oni Press and, per Polarity, "moved into an unspecified 'board and advisory' role"; James Lucas Jones remained as publisher and became president of OLFPG. Multiple layoffs due to the merger were also reported.

Asher Elbein, for The Daily Beast, reported that the layoffs included queer women, women of color, and employees who "had accessibility requests or accommodations with Oni under the Americans with Disabilities Act". Elbein wrote that "at a time when indie comics companies like Oni have publicly committed to inclusivity, the fallout from the merger has been particularly ugly, and has provoked greater scrutiny of the Portland-based companies' workplace practices". Karama Horne, for SyFy Wire, commented that "not only were the layoffs swift and seemingly unexpected, but it also seemed as if the majority of those let go are women and people of color. In the current social climate, the optics are not the best, but then again, Lion Forge boasts a higher percentage of women, minorities, and LGBTQ artists, staff, and even characters compared to other profitable indie comics publishers in the industry". Steward II said to Horne: "I think a lot of people have read into the situation the wrong way. [...] But there are things that we have to do, unfortunately, from a business standpoint to make sure that the organization stays healthy and that we're able to continue to keep on our mission going forward".

In 2020, Heidi MacDonald regained ownership of The Beat – Lion Forge had purchased the New York City-based comic journalism website from MacDonald in 2017 and it later became an asset of Polarity.

In July 2021, Polarity and its subsidiary Lion Forge Animation signed with Activist Artists Management; the animation studio had previously produced the Oscar-winning short Hair Love. In September 2021, multiple lobbyists "cut ties" with Polarity when they also announced that they were "no longer working for" David Steward, founder of World Wide Technology and father of Steward II.

On June 29, 2022, it was revealed that Jones and Charlie Chu, vice president of creative & business development at OLFPG, were fired by Polarity. On July 14, both ICv2 and The Beat reported that a staff purge continued with OLFPG laying off "some of the most prominent members of its staff, including senior VP of sales and marketing Alex Segura, sales manager Henry Barajas, and senior editor Amanda Meadows" and editor Jasmine Amiri. The Beat commented that this was "the biggest public bloodbath in comics since DC Comics' layoffs last year". CBR stated that "many notable comics industry professionals made their thoughts about the layoffs known on social media, particularly in reference to OLFPG's parent company, Polarity.".

== Assets ==
=== Current ===
- Illustrated Syndicate
- Neon Metropolis
- Lion Forge Animation
- Oni-Lion Forge Publishing Group (OLFPG)
  - The Lion Forge, LLC
    - Lion Forge Comics
      - Caracal
      - Catalyst Prime
      - CubHouse
      - Magnetic Press
      - Quillon
      - Roar
    - Lion Forge Labs
  - Oni Press
    - EC Comics
    - Limerence Press

=== Former ===
- The Beat (2018 – 2020)
