= Beneath the Trees Where Nobody Sees =

2024 comic book by Patrick Horvath

Beneath The Trees Where Nobody Sees
- No. of issues: 6
- Publisher: IDW Publishing

Creative team
- Letterer: Hassan Otsmane-Elhaou
- Creator: Patrick Horvath
- ISBN: 9798887241081

Chronology
- Followed by: Beneath the Trees Where Nobody Sees: Rite of Spring

Beneath the Trees Where Nobody Sees is a six-issue comic book miniseries by Patrick Horvath published in 2024 by IDW Publishing. It won the 2025 Harvey Book of the Year Award and was nominated for the 2024 Eisner Award for Best New Series and Bram Stoker Award for Best Graphic Novel. A six-issue sequel series titled Beneath the Trees Where Nobody Sees: Rite of Spring was published in 2025 and 2026.

== Plot ==
In an alternative version of 1986, Earth is inhabited by both normal animals and anthropomorphic animals in the place of humans.

In the town of Woodbrook, Vermont, a brown bear named Samantha "Sam" Strong lives a double life as an upstanding hardware store owner and a serial killer. To avoid detection, she only murders outsiders. Sam leaves Woodbrook to hunt down her victims under the illusion of "appointments." When Sam finds a target, she tricks them into helping her fix her car before knocking them unconscious with sleeping gas. She then stuffs her victim into her car before driving into the forest. There, Sam kills her victims while they remain unconscious before slicing their bodies into pieces and sealing the body parts in paint cans. Sam then buries the paint cans underground before going home to Woodbrook.

Sam keeps her murderous side a secret from her friends: Charlie Burrow the mole who works as her assistant and has a wife named Pauline and two children named Wendy and Lewis; and Lola Albright, an elderly mouse who invites Sam for tea and dinner and whose only son, Nigel, has returned from university to look after her.

One day, Woodbrook's residents are preparing for their town's bicentennial celebrations which include a parade. The parade starts off fine, but gets cancelled when the mast of the ship float Bertie the turtle is riding on reveals the nailed disemboweled corpse of Martin, a goat implied to be suffering from dementia.

At a town meeting, bloodhound Sheriff Patterson promises his neighbors a thorough investigation, but a rude pig named Cherry Gherkins is adamant Bertie killed Martin. One night after bidding her owl husband, Howard, goodbye, Cherry goes out jogging, only to be chased and murdered. The next morning, Cherry's head is found stuck on a mop in the local elementary school's hallway.

The murders make headlines and cause the villagers to become paranoid and suspicious of each other. Sam decides to hunt down the murderer out of fear of having her own crimes exposed. She first suspects the cat butcher, Melody Davis, as she had been with Bertie before the parade started; Melody is also allergic to lavender, the flowers that had adorned Bertie's parade float. Sam sneaks into Melody's house and finds life-sized cat masks and a life-sized doll in Melody's bed. When Melody appears, she swears she is innocent and reveals she had made the masks and the doll to cope with her husband Frank's death.

At Martin's funeral, his friends and neighbors show up to pay their respects. As Sam listens to the preacher's sermon, she notices Nigel having an allergic reaction to a mourner's lavender perfume and realizes he is the killer. Days after the funeral, Sam confronts Nigel and he confesses to having known her double life and killed their neighbors to be friends with her. Sam angrily rejects Nigel's offer of friendship and orders him to stop following her.

Nigel gets back at Sam by killing Charlie and placing his head, as well as the paint cans containing her victims' body parts, in her hardware store. Framed for Nigel's crimes, Sam goes on the run and leaves Woodbrook. After witnessing a wild bear defend its kill from a rival and also killing it, Sam decides to make Nigel pay. She secretly returns to her hardware store and prepares to confront Nigel. Sam then goes to the Albrights' house to only find Lola. Lola reveals she has known about Nigel's and Sam's crimes, but has kept silent so as not to lose both her son and her friend. Sam, however, stabs Lola to death and when Nigel comes home, Sam injects him with curare, injures herself, and shoots him in the head.

Sam lies to the others that Nigel had tried to silence her and his mother, killing Lola and getting himself shot in a struggle over the gun. The police apologize to Sam and she gets off scot-free. Ultimately, she decides to take a break from serial killing.

== Publication history ==
In 2024, a 10-page prequel one-shot called Beneath the Trees Where Nobody Sees: Präludium was exclusively released at San Diego Comic-Con 2024.

In April 2025, Webtoon and IDW Publishing partnered to release the comic in the form of an vertical scroll webcomic on Webtoon's site.

Samantha Strong appears in DC K.O.: Boss Battle, a crossover issue published as part of the DC Comics storyline DC K.O..

An Artist's Edition containing the original series and Präludium was announced in January 2026 and will be released in July 2026.

A Halloween special was announced in June 2026 to be released in October of that year, featuring guest writers and artists including Che Grayson and James Tynion IV.

A third and final series, The Summer and The Fall, was announced at the 2026 San Diego Comic-Con, with the first issue planned to release in February 2027.

== Development ==
In an interview with The Beat, Horvath stated that Richard Scarry's Busytown was an inspiration for the work.

== Reception ==
The series was reviewed positively by Publishers Weekly, noting the contrast between the painted "children's book"-style artwork and gory subject matter. Zack Quaintance of The Beat also positively received the series, highlighting the fifth issue as a "unique take on how a monster lives and why, as well as gives chilling insight into what it must feel like to be so violent and evil" David Brooke of AIPT Comics gave the first issue a 10/10, with the site positively reviewing subsequent issues as well.

Year	Award/Honor	Result	Ref.
2026	Eisner Award for Best Graphic Album — Reprint (Storybook Edition)	Nominated	
2026	Sophie Castille Award - for Brazilian Portuguese translation Hoje É Um Belo Dia Para Matar by Érico Assis	Semifinalist	
2025	Harvey Award - Book of the Year Award	Won	
2024	American Library Association - Best Graphic Novels for Adults Top Ten	Included	
2024	Bram Stoker Award for Best Graphic Novel	Nominated	
2024	Eisner Award for Best New Series	Nominated	

Letterer Hassan Otsmane-Elhaou won the 2024 Eisner Award for Best Lettering in part for his work on the original series as well as the 2026 edition of the award for in part for his work on Rite of Spring.
