= Oni Press =

American comic book and graphic novel publisher

- Founded: 1997; 29 years ago
- Founder: Bob Schreck and Joe Nozemack
- Country of origin: United States
- Headquarters location: Portland, Oregon
- Distribution: Lunar Distribution; Diamond Comic Distributors; Simon & Schuster
- Publication types: Comics; Graphic novels
- Imprints: Limerence Press
- Owner: Polarity
- Official website: onipress.com

Oni Press is an American independent comic book and graphic novel publisher based in Portland, Oregon, best known for publishing such series as Scott Pilgrim and Rick and Morty. In 2019, it became an imprint label following the company's merger with Lion Forge Comics. The merged company, Oni–Lion Forge Publishing Group (OLFPG), is owned by Polarity. Oni Press has remained the "predominant name used for publishing comics" by OLFPG.

== Overview ==
The company name derives from oni, the word for the ogre demons popular in Japanese folklore.

Oni Press used the term "real mainstream," coined by Stephen L. Holland of the UK comic shop Page 45, to suggest that the subject matter it publishes is more in line with the popular genres of other media, such as thrillers, romances and realistic drama. For the most part, Oni Press avoids publishing superhero titles, unless interesting creators approach these concepts from an unusual angle. However, at one point, Rich Johnston of All The Rage reported that Oni Press and Marvel Comics were creating a publishing deal for Oni creators to work on Marvel superhero characters, but the deal fell apart.

Oni Press publishes few comic books on an ongoing monthly basis - Marc Guggenheim's Resurrection, Antony Johnston and Christopher Mitten's Wasteland and Brian Hurrt and Cullen Bunn's Sixth Gun. Greg Rucka's Queen & Country was published monthly from 2001 to 2007. Most of its titles are either irregular recurring miniseries, often published in four to six monthly installments, or original graphic novels.

Oni Press material initially released as comic books is usually later collected into trade paperbacks. They have published well over 100 titles, with multiple books undergoing reprints due to sustained popularity. Several of their books have won the Eisner Award including: Bryan Lee O'Malley's Scott Pilgrim, Rick Spear and Chuck BB's Black Metal, Hope Larson's Grey Horses, and Greg Rucka's Whiteout: Melt and Queen & Country, with many more receiving nominations.

== History ==
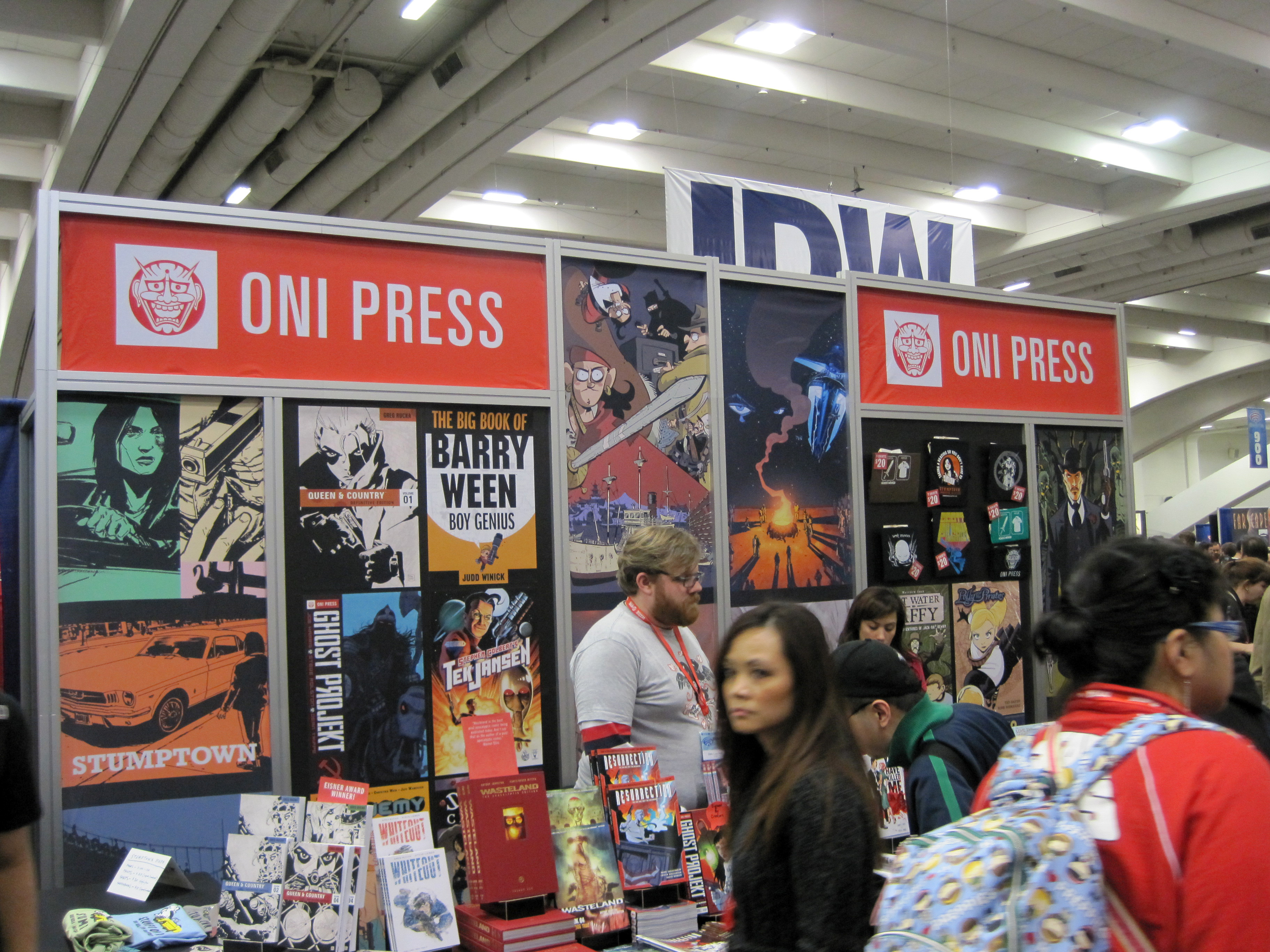
Oni Press booth, WonderCon 2010

It was founded in 1997 by Bob Schreck and Joe Nozemack with the goal of publishing comics and graphic novels they would want to read. Unsatisfied with the material that was dominating the industry, they believed firmly that sequential art could be used to tell virtually any story. Schreck left the company in 1999, leaving Oni Press owned by Nozemack and Jamie S. Rich. In 2004, Rich left the company; Oni Press was then owned by Nozemack, James Lucas Jones, and Charlie Chu.

Oni Press had a film and television production unit, Closed on Mondays, headed by Eric Gitter and located in Los Angeles, California. However, in 2015, because of creative differences originating from the geographical distance between offices, Oni and Gitter parted ways, and Oni established a new film and production arm, Oni Entertainment.

In 2016, the publisher launched Limerence Press, an imprint for erotic and sex-education comics, "focused on positive, diverse, and approachable stories that reflect a wide variety of emotional and intimate experiences".

Oni Press underwent a reorganization in January 2018, with Nozemack acting as founder and chief financial officer, Jones as publisher, Chu as vice president of creative & business development. and other staff also promoted. In January 2019, Sarah Gaydos was promoted to editor in chief. In March 2019, Oni was the 9th or 10th ranked publisher on Diamond's Direct Market market share chart, by unit share or dollar share.

=== Merger ===
In May 2019, Oni Press merged with Lion Forge Comics, becoming Oni–Lion Forge Publishing Group (OLFPG), a subsidiary of Polarity. Nozemack stepped down as president in an advisory role. Jones remained as publisher and president, and Chu remained as vice president of creative & business development. Multiple layoffs due to the merger were also reported. The company began emphasizing the Oni brand, with the Lion Forge name becoming "largely dormant". In June 2021, Gaydos stepped down as editor-in-chief. Jones became interim editor-in-chief. In June 2022, Jones stated that "OLFPG has a staff of roughly 30 and expects to add more" and that it "plans to publish 40 original graphic novels in 2022 (60, counting books delayed by supply chain issues), in addition to an extensive list of periodical comics," with Simon & Schuster as their book distributor.

Following the merger with Lion Forge, which had published the memoir Gender Queer by Maia Kobabe, the company became involved in controversy and legal actions involving the book. In June 2022, Virginian politicians Tim Anderson and Tommy Altman sued Kobabe and OLFPG over Gender Queer under state law, alleging that the graphic novel was "obscene for unrestricted viewing by minors". OLFPG filed a "Demurrer and Motion to Dismiss" which arguing the plaintiffs misrepresent the nature of the book and further lacks standing to sue.

In June 2022, Jones and Chu were fired by Polarity, followed by publicity director Tara Lehmann leaving the company. In July, the company laid off senior VP of sales and marketing Alex Segura, sales manager Henry Barajas, senior editor Amanda Meadows, and editor Jasmine Amiri. Senior vice president of games and operations Steve Ellis and associate publisher Michelle Nguyen remained with the company. Additionally, Oni Press cancelled both their floor space and their panels at the upcoming San Diego Comic-Con. Also in July 2022, Christina "Steenz" Stewart – an Oni freelancer and former Lion Forge editor – alleged on social media that Oni Press wasn't paying creators their royalties, with several Oni creators responding with similar complaints.

In December 2022, Hunter Gorinson was appointed publisher and president of OLFPG. Sierra Hahn was then named the company's new editor-in-chief in February 2023.
