= The Sandwalk Adventures =

Graphic novel by Jay Hosler

- The Sandwalk Adventures (hardback edition)

Publication information
- Publisher: Active Synapse

Creative team
- Created by: Jay Hosler
- Written by: Jay Hosler
- Artist(s): Jay Hosler

The Sandwalk Adventures is a graphic novel created by Assistant Professor of Biology at Juniata College, Jay Hosler. It was originally published in 2001 as five comic books, and republished as into a single graphic novel in 2003. The Sandwalk Adventures is the tale of follicle mites living in the left eyebrow of Charles Darwin himself. The mites believe Darwin to be a god, one of their creation myths handed down from generation to generation, and he has to set them straight about that and other mite fables. A humorous series of illustrated lessons in natural selection and evolution ensues.

== Reception ==
The Sandwalk Adventures was nominated for an Eisner Award in 2002.
