= Treasure Hunters (comic) =

2002 book by Jeff Smith

- First US edition cover
- Author: Jeff Smith
- Illustrator: Jeff Smith
- Cover artist: Jeff Smith; Steve Hamaker
- Language: English
- Series: Bone
- Genre: Fantasy, comedy
- Publisher: Cartoon Books
- Publication date: November 6, 2002
- Publication place: United States
- Media type: Hardback and paperback
- Pages: 144
- ISBN: 1-888963-12-3 (hardback); ISBN 1-888963-13-1 (paperback)
- OCLC: 50874646
- Preceded by: Ghost Circles
- Followed by: Crown of Horns

Treasure Hunters is the eighth book in the Bone series. It collects issues 44-49 of Jeff Smith's self-published Bone comic book series. The book was published by Cartoon Books in 2002 and in color by Scholastic Press in 2008.

This volume follows life in the old capital of Atheia as the inhabitants of the valley take shelter from the Ghost Circles and the Rat Creature armies, and as the growing unrest threatens to reveal Thorn's identity to her enemies. Meanwhile, Phoney Bone comes up with a scheme to mint his own coins.

== Synopsis ==
=== The Gate of Atheia ===
Thorn, the Bone cousins, and Gran'ma Ben reach Atheia at last, and find the city crammed with refugees. A young girl named Taneal gives Thorn a tiny prayer stone. Phoney and Smiley sneak Bartleby into the city in a hay wagon stolen from an innocent farmer. Later, Gran'ma Ben takes Thorn and the Bones to meet her teacher, who runs a rooftop kitchen in the city.

=== The Cold Spot ===
The Teacher tells them that the inner council who once watched over the city has been replaced with a group calling themselves the Vedu (the "Order of the Dreaming Eye"), who oppose the Dragons and anyone who associates with them. The Teacher examines Taneal's prayer stone, noting it is engraved with the name of Lunaria (Thorn's mother). The shadow of Briar appears around Fone Bone, beckoning Thorn, and it takes the strength of everyone to hold her back. The Teacher warns that Thorn will be at risk in her dreams, and must therefore be kept awake. In the Eastern mountains, the real Briar plots with the Lord of the Locusts to attack Atheia. The human warriors of Pawa have joined forces with the Rat Creatures, forming an army larger and stronger than ever, and confident in the knowledge that the Dragons no longer defend the Old Kingdom. Meanwhile, Kingdok lurks in a tunnel.

=== Pals ===
At the barn, Smiley has brought Bartleby some breakfast. The remaining Bone cousins go through the town, but Phoney decides to stop in the marketplace to see what the locals are using for currency.

=== To Be or Not to Bee ===
In the Atheian marketplace, Phoney and Fone Bone fight with a ferocious giant bee, and the merchants thank the Bones for chasing the bee off, explaining that he and other bees terrorize the marketplace (in anger at the merchants for selling water rations to the bees at inflated prices). They offer the Bones gold to keep the bees away. Meanwhile, Gran'ma Ben and the Teacher have kept Thorn awake, and the Teacher explains that Tarsil, commander of the Royal Guard, has blamed the Dragons for the appearance of the Ghost Circles and ordered his soldiers to destroy Dragon shrines and all the Dragons' allies.

=== Moonwort ===
Word reaches the Royal Guard that Thorn and Ben are in the city, and they conduct a search for them. Tarsil himself meets with the head of the city's merchants' guild to discuss the embargo the Royal Guard has imposed. Word soon reaches him of the presence of the crown princess Thorn, and he orders his men to put her to death. Ted the bug brings Thorn word that Lucius and the others are still alive, and will reach Atheia in two days' time, but Briar and her army will arrive sooner. Gran'ma Ben tells Ted to carry a message back to Lucius and his army, planning to trap Briar, the Pawans, and the Rat Creatures in a pincer movement. That night, Thorn, Ben, and the resistance hold a rooftop meeting to plan for the forthcoming conflict, and to discuss Tarsil's oppression of Dragon lore; but the meeting is cut short when Fone Bone warns everyone of the Royal Guard.

=== The Crown of Horns ===
Hiding from the search party, another of Ben's former Teachers tells Thorn that she will soon be tested, and suggests taking her from Atheia. Fone Bone loses his temper at this and reveals his and Thorn's journey inside a Ghost Circle. Thorn confirms the story, adding that the spirit of her mother told her to seek the Crown of Horns. The Headmaster warns Thorn against finding it, predicting that if she, with a piece of the Locust inside her, were to come into contact with the Crown, it could destroy all existence. Meanwhile, Phoney Bone has found the city's treasury, and sneaks out with Smiley to raid it. They are caught by the Royal Guard, but as they are about to arrest the Bones, the bees quarrel with the merchants again. Gran'ma Ben rushes to stop the fight, but the Bones are arrested and imprisoned. At the city wall, Thorn reveals her presence to one of the Royal Guard when he assaults Taneal for setting up a Dragon shrine. He soon returns with Tarsil and a squadron to arrest her; and Briar and her vast army of Rat Creatures and Pawans have arrived at the city's gates.
