= Ben Passmore =

American comics artist and cartoonist

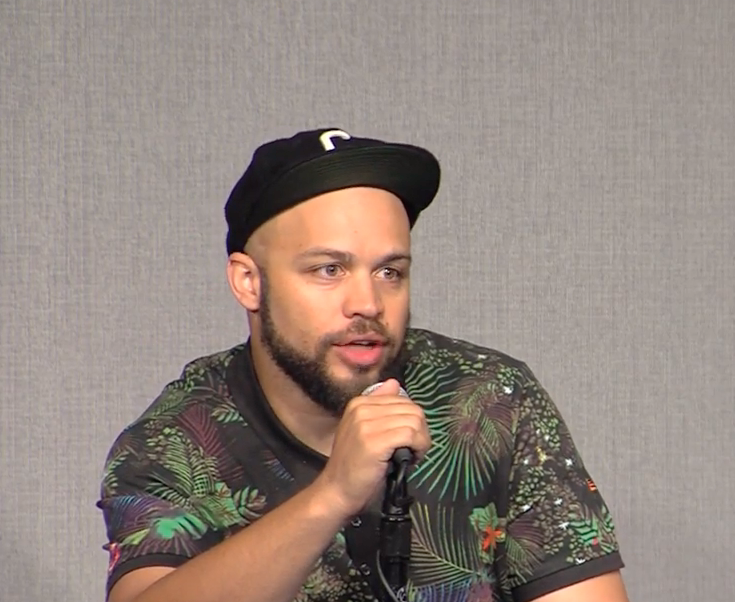
- Ben Passmore speaking at the Small Press Expo in November 2019
- Born: 1983 (age 42–43) Great Barrington, Massachusetts, U.S.
- Areas: Cartoonist, Artist
- Notable works: Your Black Friend
- Awards: Ignatz Award, 2017; Eisner Award, 2021

Ben Passmore (born 1983) is an American comics artist and political cartoonist.

== Early life ==
Born and raised in Great Barrington, Massachusetts, Passmore attended art school at Savannah College of Art and Design where he majored in comics with a minor in illustration.

== Career ==
Passmore's works, ranging from the fantastical to the autobiographical, contain social commentary on politics, activism, white supremacy, the United States, sports, and the experience of black Americans. He was a frequent contributor to the comics publication The Nib.

His book Your Black Friend was originally self-published in 2016 and then reissued by Silver Sprocket in 2018. The book is a collection of short vignettes offering the experiences of a black man in a world of white people. Your Black Friend was inspired by Black Skin, White Masks, Frantz Fanon's 1952 book about the impacts of racism. The book has been compared to the Jimbo comic strip by Gary Panter. Passmore's book won the 2017 Ignatz Award for Outstanding Comic, received an Eisner Award nomination that year for Best Single-Issue, and was featured on NPR's list of 100 favorite comics and graphic novels. The work has been adapted into a short animated film.

== Publications ==
- Your Black Friend (self-published, 2016; reissued by Silver Sprocket, 2018)
- DAYGLOAYHOLE was written while Passmore lived in New Orleans. It is a quarterly webcomics series published in 2017 and 2018 by Silver Sprocket Bicycle Club. It follows two characters, including Passmore as himself, wandering around a post-apocalyptic New Orleans. It was nominated for an Ignatz Award for Outstanding Series in 2019.
- BTTM FDRS, published with Ezra Claytan Daniels in February 2019 by Fantagraphics Books. The publisher describes the book as an "Afrofuturist horror-comedy about gentrification, hip hop, and cultural appropriation." It was named one of the best books of 2019 by Hyperallergic magazine, the Chicago Public Library, and the New York Public Library, and was nominated for both Eisner and Harvey awards. It's currently in development as a feature film.
- Sports is Hell, published by Koyama Press in February 2020. The book is a satire about the breakout of a violent revolution during the Super Bowl, using football to explore themes of racism, resistance, white supremacy, allyship, identity, and alienation. It won the Eisner Award for Best Single Issue/One Shot in 2021. The book appears on The 100 Best Comics of the Decade List created by The Beat.
- Black Arms to Hold You Up, published by Pantheon Books on October 7, 2025. A fictionalized version of Passmore and an invented revolutionary father traverse a history of black armed struggle. This heavily-researched and citational work draws on figures and movements including Robert Charles, The UNIA, Robert F. Williams, The Republic of New Afrika, Assata Shakur, MOVE, Sanyika Shakur, and Micah Xavier Johnson. It won a 2026 Eisner Award for Best Reality-Based Work.
