= Crisis Zone (graphic novel) =

2021 work by Simon Hanselmann

- Date: August 17, 2021
- Page count: 292 pages
- Publisher: Fantagraphics
- ISBN: 9781683964445

Crisis Zone is a graphic novel created by Simon Hanselmann, featuring the characters from his Megg, Mogg, & Owl series as they deal with the events of the COVID-19 pandemic. It exists in a separate timeline to the main Megg, Mogg, & Owl series. The series was originally serially published on Instagram during 2020 before being released as a graphic novel with additional material in 2021.

== Critical reception ==
Crisis Zone received highly positive reviews from critics. In The New York Times, Ed Park said that it was "the first great work of pandemic fiction". Jack Chelgren in the Los Angeles Review of Books called it "a sensitive, sometimes funny, sometimes disturbing account of [2020]", though felt that "some of the more extreme displays of bad politics in Crisis Zone lose their satirical edge by replicating the same narrow-mindedness the book seems to want to critique". Reviewing the original Instagram release for SOLRAD in 2020, Lane Yates called the comic "perfectly captivating to engage with and to be engaged with".
