= Clan Apis =

Graphic novel by Jay Hosler

- Clan Apis (hardback edition)

Publication information
- Publisher: Active Synapse

Creative team
- Created by: Jay Hosler
- Written by: Jay Hosler
- Artist: Jay Hosler

Clan Apis, also known as The Way of the Hive: A Honey Bee's Story, is a graphic novel created by then Assistant Professor (now Full Professor) of Biology at Juniata College, Jay Hosler. It was originally published by Active Synapse in 1998 as five comic books, and as a single graphic novel in 2000. The novel follows the life story of a honey bee named Nyuki learning about her purpose in the vast world of insects.

== Plot ==
Nyuki begins her life as a honey bee larva. Taken care of by another older bee named Dvorah within the bee hive, she tells her a fictional myth about the ”World Flower”, how the universe came into existence from the pollen grains of a cosmic flower. She continues to explain the evolution of life on Earth and how insects fulfilled many niches, including the honey bee's role as a pollinator. The bees' ever-changing roles as they get older (such as Dvorah's role from cleaning empty brood cells to capping them) makes Nyuki curious, but is scared by having to undergo metamorphosis alone. She is reassured that every bee has to go through with it and after completing it they will never feel alone again.

Finally finishing her metamorphosis into a grown honey bee, she believes that she is special but is called a "goofball" by other bees whom mentions that every bee in the hive underwent the same process. Dvorah reunites with her once again and plans to join the bee swarm to a new site. Interrupted by the swarm stampede, they meet the queen bee Hachi. Nyuki curiously asks why she has a large abdomen and Hachi explains her role as both "slave and sovereign", where she needs to tirelessly lay eggs and control her workers with pheromones. She plans to leave immediately as the sounds of piping from queen brood cells begin.

Queen Hachi begins the task of sending scouts to find a suitable place for a newly built bee hive. Dvorah decides to join the search and advises the inexperienced Nyuki to stay put. While waiting, she is surprised by a drone bee named Zambur going around greeting everyone. She flies off on her own after tirelessly waiting around to find the best spot and lands on a tree branch. A mantis hiding in the tree leaves attempts to catch her but she nearly escapes. Now lost from the swarm cluster, she lands on a flower to think but is caught by a camouflaged crab spider named Thom. A dung beetle named Sisyphus passes by and accidentally knocks Nyuki off the flower with his dung ball, saving her from being consumed. He is willing to help her get back to the swarm. On their travel, Sisyphus explains to her how each insect species has their own purpose and lifestyle, such as Nyuki's role as a bee. They say their goodbyes once they find the swarm and she meets up with a worried Dvorah, who was about to head to the new hive.

A honey bee from a different group is halted from entering the newly built hive. After she kills one of the guarding bees, they retaliate by surrounding and killing her with heat. Meanwhile, Nyuki is tasked to work on constructing honeycombs with other honey bees named Ari and Bij while constantly talking about the wonders of comb construction. Zambur comes across her again and asks for some honey. She wonders why and he explains his purpose as a drone bee, to mate with a queen and die afterwards. She is baffled but he gladly accepts this role.

Dvorah suggests that she should be a forager, but she refuses due to her previous experience on the outside. As they were arguing, a woodpecker begins drilling into the hive. Dvorah heads outside while Nyuki tries to comfort the bee larvae in their cells. Dvorah targets the woodpecker's eye as a weak point and strikes with her stinger but as a result is mortally wounded. Nyuki, refusing to let her go by an undertaker bee, brings her outside herself. Dvorah tells her one last story about a leaf she saw eventually blown off of a branch, falling onto a stream, and gliding along the top of it to tell her to stop hiding from the world and her life.

Time passes, and Nyuki is now an older bee teaching other younger bees techniques like the waggle dance. She makes friends with another honey bee named Melissa who becomes more reluctant to letting her continue foraging. Nyuki frequently gathers the nectar from a flower named Bloomington and tells sedentary jokes to it. During her last foraging trip, her wings give out and she lands far away from the hive. She crawls all the way to Bloomington and it realizes she is dying. Sisyphus hear its cry for help and finds her again under it. She retells one of Dvorah's "World Flower" stories rewarding bees in the afterlife where they will never need to work ever again and just socialize on its grand stem. She bases her big plan off this story by enriching herself into the soil for Bloomington so next spring Melissa can bring back its nectar back to the hive. They understood her intentions and mourn for her death.

Next spring, Bloomington sprouts back up again and awaits only for Melissa to arrive to offer its nectar. It tells her how Nyuki wanted to return home as a full load of nectar. Melissa happily understands and brings the nectar back to the hive.

== Reception ==
Popular Science called it "absolutely wonderful" and a "beautiful story", with a "delightful cast". Modern Farmer stated that it was "one of the better graphic novels we’ve ever read, period", commending Hosler's linework and composition and noting the novel's "surprisingly touching plot"; similarly, Discover observed its "moving conclusion".

== Awards ==
Xeric Award (1998)
