= Jay Hosler =

American entomologist, author, and illustrator

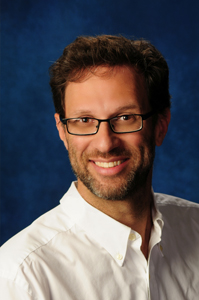
- Jay Hosler
- Born: Jay Scott Hosler
- Occupations: Full Professor of Biology at Juniata College, Author, illustrator
- Writing career
- Notable works: Clan Apis, The Sandwalk Adventures, Optical Allusions The Last of the Sandwalkers

Jay Hosler is the author and illustrator of science-oriented comics. He is best known for his graphic novels Clan Apis, The Sandwalk Adventures, and Optical Allusions. Clan Apis, a Xeric Foundation Award winner, follows the life of a honey bee named Nyuki; the story conveys factual information about honey bees in a humorous fashion as Nyuki learns about each new stage of her life. The Sandwalk Adventures, an Eisner Award nominee, follows a conversation about evolution between Charles Darwin and a follicle mite living in his left eyebrow. Optical Allusions, funded in part by a National Science Foundation grant, explains the evolution of the eye and vision by following the story of Wrinkles the Wonderbrain. Hosler is also an entomologist and David K Goodman '74 Professor of Biology at Juniata College.

== Biography ==
Hosler grew up in Huntington, Indiana and is a 1989 graduate of DePauw University. He received a Ph.D. in Biological Sciences at the University of Notre Dame in Indiana in 1995, and was a postdoctoral fellow at the Ohio State University's Rothenbuhler Honey Bee Research Laboratory.

Hosler was not formally trained in art, but grew up reading comics and says he "was always a doodler". He drew comic strips for the student newspaper when he was at DePauw, and was paid for a daily comic strip in the student paper when he was at Notre Dame. He first mixed his interests in science and cartooning with his 1997 publication Cow-Boy.

As an associate professor at Juniata College, Hosler has brought his interests in comics and teaching together in several ways. In addition to creating Clan Apis and The Sandwalk Adventures, Hosler was awarded a grant from the National Science Foundation to create a hybrid of comics and traditional textbook covering the evolution of vision and sensory biology, Optical Allusions. "Student performance ratings in science in secondary education are dropping at an alarming rate, so clearly something isn't working well in the classroom," Hosler says. "We can't be afraid to try something radical to change how students learn." Hosler has also team-taught (with a historian) a course on "Comics and Culture".

He and his wife Lisa have two sons, Maxwell Scott and Jack DeMoss.

== Influences ==
Hosler cites Steve Ditko, Stan Lee and Jack Kirby as early influences that drew him to comics. He also cites Gary Larson, Bill Watterson, Jeff Smith, Linda Medley, and Larry Marder as later influences.

== Bibliography ==
=== Graphic novels ===
- Clan Apis, published by Active Synapse, 2000
- The Sandwalk Adventures, published by Active Synapse, 2003
- Optical Allusions, published by Active Synapse, 2008
- Evolution. (art by Kevin Cannon and Zander Cannon) Hill and Wang, ISBN 978-0-8090-9476-9, 2011
- Last of the Sandwalkers published by First Second, 2015
- The Way of the Hive: A Honey Bee's Story, published by HarperAlley, 2021
- Santiago!: Santiago Ramón y Cajal!Artist, Scientist, Troublemaker, published by Margaret Ferguson Books, 2022

=== Comics ===
- Cow-Boy #1, Active Synapse, 1997
- "The Conundrum of the Killer Coronavirus" in the Emerging Diseases issues of Your World: Biotechnology and You (14.1), 2004
- "The Diabolical Dr. Nonono" in AWIS Magazine, 2004
- illustrated 6 pages in Suspended in Language by Jim Ottaviani and Leland Purvis, G. T. Labs, ISBN 978-0-9660106-5-7, 2004

=== Scientific Publications ===
- Hosler, Jay S., Buxton, Kristi L. and Smith, Brian H. (2000). Impairment of Olfactory Discrimination by Blockade of GABA and Nitric Oxide Activity in the Honey Bee Antennal Lobe. Behavioral Neuroscience 114 No. 3 pg. 514–525
- Hosler, Jay S. and Smith, Brian H. (2000). Blocking and the detection of odor components in blends. Journal of Experimental Biology 203, 2797–2806
- Chandra, S., Hosler, J. S. and Smith, B. H. (2000). Heritable variation for latent inhibition and its correlation to reversal learning in the honey bee, Apis mellifera. Journal of Comparative Psychology 114, No.1, 86–97.
- Hosler, J. S., Burns J. E., and Esch H. E. (2000). Flight Muscle Resting Potential and Species-Specific Differences in Insect Chill-Coma. Journal of Insect Physiology 45 No.5 pg. 621–627
