= Lion Forge Comics =

American comic book publisher

- Company logo
- Parent company: Polarity
- Founded: 2011; 15 years ago
- Founder: David Steward II; Carl Reed
- Defunct: 2019; 7 years ago (publishing duties transferred to Oni Press)
- Country of origin: United States
- Headquarters location: St. Louis; Portland
- Distribution: Diamond Book Distributors (books)
- Publication types: Comics
- Imprints: Caracal; CubHouse; Quillon; Roar Comics
- Owner: Polarity
- Official website: Lion Forge Entertainment

Lion Forge Comics was an American comic book publisher founded in 2011 by David Steward II and Carl Reed. The company published works by a range of creators and focused on storytelling influenced by specific cultures and ethnics. In 2019, it became an imprint label following the company's merger with Oni Press. The merged company, Oni–Lion Forge Publishing Group, is owned by Polarity. As of 2022, the Lion Forge name is largely dormant in its original role as a comic book publisher, with Oni Press handling the publishing. However, Lion Forge is still used as a brand name for other divisions, such as Lion Forge Entertainment, which was founded by Steward II in 2019 and follows a similar focus on diverse narratives.

== Company history ==
=== Lion Forge ===
Lion Forge Comics was founded in 2011 by David Steward II and Carl Reed to give ethnically diverse creators an outlet to create ethnically diverse characters. The company began as a digital publisher but experimented with print comics when digital sales began to plateau industry wide. Initially, Lion Forge worked on developing their own original properties. However, the company picked up NBCUniversal 1980s properties Airwolf, Knight Rider, Miami Vice, Punky Brewster, and Saved by the Bell. In 2012, the company launched its initial titles, and followed that up with American Greetings properties Care Bears, Madballs, and Packages from Planet X.

By 2014, Lion Forge had staff in New York and Los Angeles in addition to its headquarters in St. Louis. In mid 2014, the company announced a children's line, Roar Comics, would launch with six titles. They also announced IDW Publishing would publish and distribute print version of their comic books.

In July 2016, general counsel Geoff Gerber was promoted to president taking over from founder David Steward, who was named founder/publisher. Plus, additional editors and sale and marketing staff were also hired.

It expanded its print line in the Fall of 2016 with the CubHouse imprint for grades pre-K through 12, splitting that age group off from Roar Comics. Both lines would be under Andrea Colvin as senior editor. By late 2017, it had grown to 30 employees located in St Louis, Chicago, and New York City, with many employees remote working, and with Geoff Gerber as the company president. On Free Comic Book Day 2016, May 6, Lion Forge launched its superhero universe line, Catalyst Prime, under senior editor Joe Illidge with a single issue.

The company began to grow through acquisitions in 2016. In early October 2016 it purchased Magnetic Press, renaming it as Magnetic Collection. In October 2017, it purchased the New York City-based comic journalism site Comics Beat. Steward created a subsidiary called Syndicated Comics to control assets and content generated by Comics Beat.

In 2018, Steward II founded Polarity, a media company intended to develop Lion Forge characters outside of comics, as well as serve as a holding company and investment platform for animation and other pop culture content.

In February 2018, Lion Forge Comics indicated that it would enter the picture book market with a line under its CubHouse imprint that would hit the stands in May with two original picture books. In May 2018, Lion Forge announced its middle reader imprint, Caracal, with its first titles to hit the stand in late 2018. Lion Forge announced in June 2018 the Quillion imprint for tabletop gaming inspired stories to debut in September 2018.

In November 2018, after a year of rapid expansion in staff and focus, the company laid off twelve out of approximately sixty employees primarily in editorial, in a restructuring move.

=== Oni–Lion Forge Publishing Group ===
On May 8, 2019, Oni Press announced a merger with Lion Forge Comics with the merger negotiated by Polarity. Newsarama reported that "in March 2019, Oni was the 10th ranked publisher on Diamond's Direct Market market share chart with 0.74% in dollar share and 9th in unit share with 0.64%. Lion Forge was not ranked in the top 10". The two companies merged into the Oni–Lion Forge Publishing Group (OLFPG) and became a subsidiary of Polarity. Oni Press and Lion Forge remained as imprint labels. All editorial, marketing, and production operations were moved to Portland – where Oni Press was headquartered – from St. Louis, where Lion Forge was headquartered. Joe Nozemack stepped down as president of Oni Press and, per Polarity, "moved into an unspecified 'board and advisory' role"; James Lucas Jones, of Oni Press, remained as publisher and became president of OLFPG. Multiple layoffs due to the merger were also reported. OPB reported that "Lion Forge cut ties with editor-in-chief Andrea Colvin, associate editor Christina "Steenz" Stewart, editor Jasmine Amiri, senior editor Amanda Meadows and Kayla Tan, a production and logistics coordinator".

Asher Elbein of The Daily Beast reported that the layoffs included queer women, women of color, and employees who had requested accommodations under the Americans with Disabilities Act. Elbein noted that the layoffs raised concerns about workplace practices at Oni–Lion Forge, particularly given the company's public commitment to inclusivity. Karama Horne of SyFy Wire observed that many of those affected appeared to be women and people of color, commenting on the broader implications in the comics industry. In response, David Steward II stated that the layoffs were a business decision necessary to maintain the company's stability and mission.

The company now operates under the Oni–Lion Forge Publishing Group (OLFPG) name for business matters. However, Oni Press has become the primary name used for comic book publishing, while the Lion Forge name remains largely dormant, with Oni Press (as OLFPG) handling publishing operations. In June 2021, Sarah Gaydos stepped down as editor-in-chief; Jones became interim editor-in-chief.

On June 29, 2022, it was revealed that Jones and Charlie Chu, vice president of creative & business development, were fired by Polarity. On July 14, The Beat reported that a staff purge continued with the company laying off some of the most prominent members of its staff, including senior VP of sales and marketing Alex Segura, sales manager Henry Barajas, and senior editor Amanda Meadows and editor Jasmine Amiri.

== Lines ==
Lion Forge had several imprints aimed at different demographics. CubHouse was Lion Forge Comics’ imprint for children ages 8 and under. It publishes graphic novels and picture books. The imprint's first picture books released in May 2018 were Oothar the Blue by author-illustrator Brandon Reese and This Is a Taco! by Andrew Cangelose, illustrated by Josh Shipley. The Caracal imprint focuses on material for audiences aged 8–12. The first title under the imprint was released in late 2018. Young adults and teens are targeted by the Roar Comics imprint. Some of its tiles include Lighter Than My Shadow and The Castoffs. The imprint was founded in 2014 with six titles, Care Bears, Punky Brewster, Saved by the Bell and original comics such as Roboy, Crystal Cadets and MER. Fans of role playing games are the intended audience for the Quillon imprint, which releases comics inspired by tabletop role playing games. The first title, Rolled & Told, was released in September 2018. Each issue includes a ready-to-play adventure.

=== Catalyst Prime ===
Joe Illidge, who began his career at the minority-focused comic publisher Milestone Media in 1993, was hired as Senior Editor to oversee the superhero imprint Catalyst Prime in June 2016. In 2017, he told the Washington Post he wanted to focus on diverse characters and creators, but that he did not want the line to be defined by that focus. In a listicle of the best Black comics for the Stillwater News-Press, Lawrence Ware praised this line for "its dedication to authentic, three-dimensional portrayals of the lead characters".

Comics in this line are set in a shared universe where superpowers are triggered by events following an asteroid approaching Earth. The initial seven ongoing series in the imprint are Noble, Accell, Superb, Incidentals, Asthonisher, Kino and Summit. The next two series were Quincredible and the crossover event Seven Days.

=== Magnetic Collection ===
Lion Forge acquired Magnetic Press in October 2016 and renamed it the Magnetic Collection. The collection is a cross-imprint brand line of curated material. Mike Kennedy, Magnetic Press Publisher and President, moved over with the purchase as Creative Director of the Magnetic Collection. Some of these titles are A Glance Backward, Doomboy, the Love trilogy, Warship Jolly Roger and Wasted Lands Omnibus.

== Lion Forge Entertainment ==
Lion Forge Entertainment (LFE) is an American entertainment company founded in 2019 by David Steward II and based in Los Angeles, California. A division of Polarity, the company develops and produces live-action and animated films, television series, and consumer products. LFE works with intellectual properties from Lion Forge Comics and also creates original content. Its animated productions are released under the Lion Forge Animation label.

The company’s first project, Hair Love, was released in 2019 alongside The Angry Birds Movie 2 in theaters. The short film received positive critical recognition and won the Academy Award for Best Animated Short Film in 2020.
