= Simon Hanselmann =

Tasmanian-born cartoonist

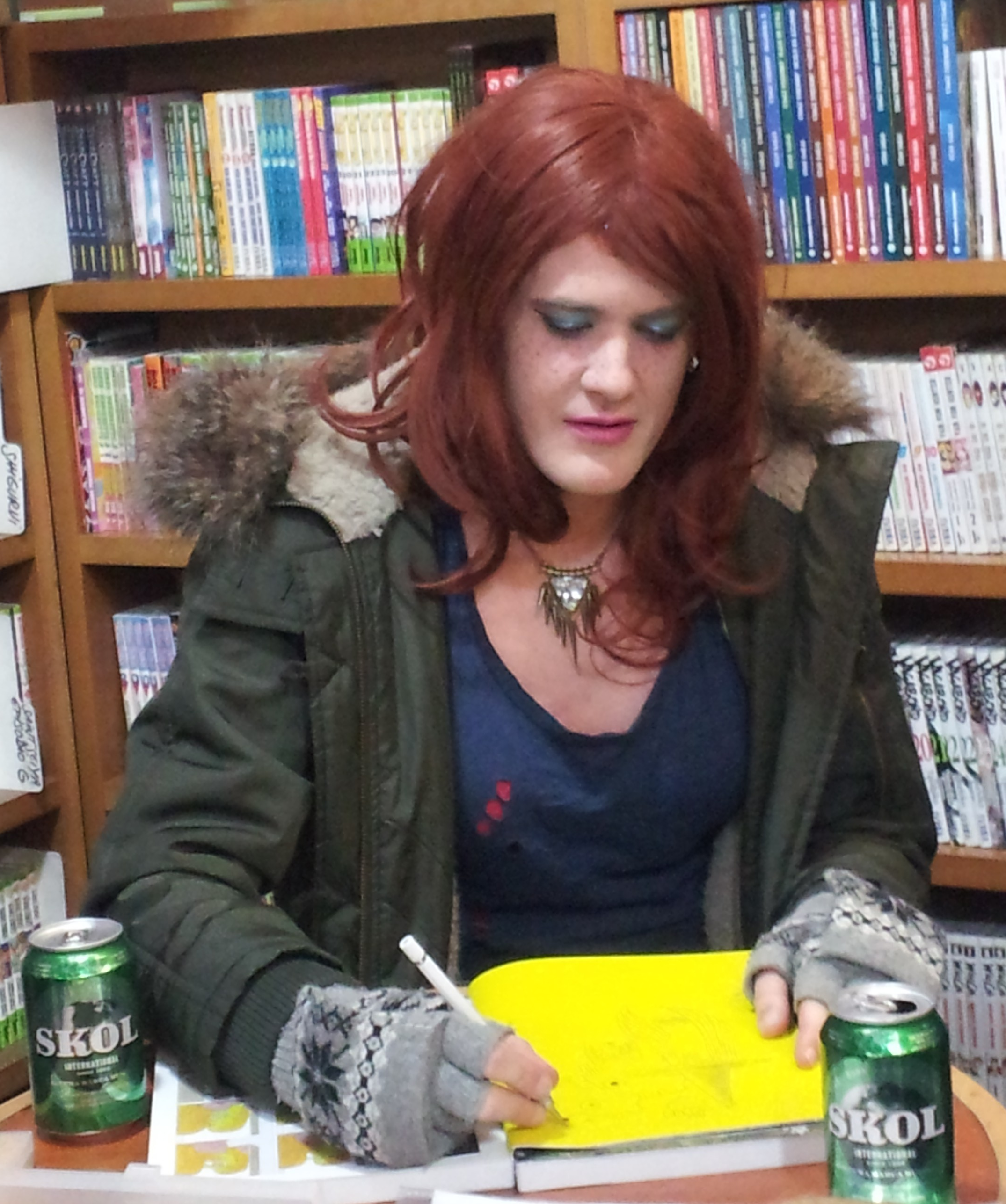
- Hanselmann holding the comic book Bad Gateway
- Born: 1981 Launceston, Tasmania, Australia
- Area: Cartoonist

Simon Hanselmann (born 1981) is an Australian-born cartoonist best known for his Megg, Mogg, and Owl series. Hanselmann has been nominated four times for an Ignatz Award, four times for an Eisner Award (winning twice), two times for the Harvey Award and won Best Series at Angouleme 2018.

== Early and personal life ==
Hanselmann was born in 1981, in Launceston, Tasmania, where he was raised by his heroin-addicted mother alone. Despite their circumstances, Hanselmann declares his mother did "a really fucking amazing job" wherein she provided him with a "lot of toys and shit. Lots of books" and a safe home environment. A self-proclaimed "awkward nerd" Hanselmann grew up deeply interested in secondhand bookshops and comics. By age eight, Hanselmann began self-publishing his own booklets.

By age 20, Hanselmann left home. In early 2008, he moved to mainland Australia, a year later he moved to London for two years. As of 2022, he lives in California with his wife and daughter. Hanselmann is gender fluid.

== Career ==
Hanselmann's work is reflective of the people he has known and the experiences he has had. He compares his work to the like of Todd Solondz, Peter Bagge, and The Simpsons. He recounts being inspired by the drawing styles of Paper Rad and Fort Thunder. His goal for his own creations is to create characters that feel like real people with room for growth.

As of 2016, Hanselmann's Megg, Mogg, and Owl comics are published in 13 languages internationally.

Although the title characters are a witch and a cat, like the popular 1970s children's book heroes Meg and Mog, "they are emphatically not the same". In Hanselmann's stories, the pair are "depressed drug users struggling with life", and are usually accompanied by two other regular characters, the uptight Owl and the highly volatile Werewolf Jones. Hanselmann's creation of these characters began in an accidental manner when he needed a fun outlet from his work on his graphic novel.

Hanselmann's primary English-language publisher is Fantagraphics Books.

In March 2020, he began serializing a pandemic-themed serial, Crisis Zone, on his Instagram.

In October 2022, Megg, Mogg & Owl made their animated debut in the anthology film The Paloni Show! Halloween Special! for Hulu produced by Justin Roiland. The short is titled Megahex, Devil’s Night, and featured the voices of Emma Chamberlain as Megg, Macaulay Culkin as Mogg, Dave Foley as Owl, and Jon Glaser as Werewolf Jones.

== Awards ==
=== Nominations ===
- 2013 Ignatz Award for Outstanding Comic for St. Owl's Bay
- 2014 Ignatz Award for Outstanding Story for "Jobs" from Life Zone
- 2016 in selection at Angoulême festival BD for "Magical Ecstacy Trip"
- 2016 Ignatz Award for Best Series and Best Story for Amsterdam
- 2017 in selection at Angoulême festival BD for "Megg & Mogg in Amsterdam"
- 2017 Eisner Award for Best Short Story for "The Comics Wedding of the Century"
- 2017 Eisner Award for Best Graphic Album Reprint for "Megg & Mogg in Amsterdam"
- 2018 Angoulême International Comics Festival Award for "Best Series"

=== Wins ===
- 2021 Eisner Award for Best Webcomic for Crisis Zone
- 2021 Eisner Award for Best Graphic Album: Reprint for Seeds and Stems

== Bibliography ==
=== Minicomics, webcomics, and anthology contributions ===
- Girl Mountain (2005-2010), unpublished graphic novel, serialized on Patreon in 2026
- Megahex Megg and Mogg Special (2009), edition of 50, self-published zine
- Fiddler's Green (2011), unpublished comic adaptation of he 1967 novella by Richard McKenna, serialized on Patreon in 2026
- Lingerie Witches (2012), self-published zine, edition of 30, reprinted in 2025 and 2026
- Life Zone (2013), Space Face Books, ISBN 978-0983800545
- St. Owl's Bay (2013), broadsheet newspaper, published by Floating World Comics
- Mould Map 3 (2014), two-page strip, published by Landfill Editions
- Megg, Mogg, & Owl (2014–ongoing), weekly comic, published online by Vice
- Werewolf Jones School of Rock (2014), four-page comic in Spring 2014 issue of the Pitchfork Review
- Werewolf Jones and Sons #1 (2015), with HTMLflowers, self-published
- Worst Behavior (2015), Pigeon Press, ISBN 978-1935443117
- Dome (2016), three-page strip, published by Lagon Revue and Breakdown Press
- Winter Trauma (2016), self-published minicomic
- Drone (2016), edition of 400, self-published minicomic
- Minihex (2016), published by Fantagraphics
- Landscape (2016), self-published minicomic
- Gouffre (2017), 10 page strip, published by Lagon Revue
- Portrait (2017), edition of 400, self-published minicomic
- Hard Rubbish (2017), 12 pages, edition of 300, self-published minicomic
- Innessential Garbage (2017), published by Fantagraphics
- WOTW (2017), 16 pages, edition of 500, self-published minicomic
- XMP-165 (2017), 28 pages, edition of 500, self-published magazine
- Performance (2017),16 pages, 3000 copies, broadsheet newspaper, published by Floating World
- Lucidity (2017), 44 pages, edition of 550, self-published minicomic
- Werewolf Jones and Sons #2 (2017), with HTMLflowers; 24 pages, edition of 500, self-published
- Romance (2017), 12 pages, edition of 600, self-published minicomic
- Apartments (2018), 24 pages, edition of 600, self-published minicomic
- Entertainment (2018), 24 pages, edition of 600, self-published minicomic
- Megg, Mogg, & Penguins (2018), with Nick Thorburn, 16 pages, edition of 700, self-published minicomic
- Decade (2018), 60 pages, edition of 750, signed and numbered self-published minicomic
- Doujinshi (2018/2024 reprint) – Self-published/bootlegged Megg & Mogg doujinshi limited run
- Exclusivity (2019), 12 pages, Chance Press, edition of 15, included with a deluxe edition of Bad Gateway with hand-painted slipcase
- Wedding Crashers (2019), one-page comic in Kramers Ergot #10
- Knife Crime (July 2019), 36 pages, self-published minicomic
- Werewolf Jones and Sons #3 (2019), with HTMLflowers, 28 pages, edition of 500, self-published minicomic
- Megahex 2020 Winter Trauma Annual (December 2019), 52 pages, edition of 700, self-published minicomic
- Below Ambition (2020), 36 pages, edition of 900, self-published minicomic
- Werewolf Jones & Sons Summer Fun Annual (2022), with Josh Pettinger, 40 pages, self-published comic
- Werewolf Jones & Sons Autumnal Grievance Spectacular (2022), with Josh Pettinger, edition of 800
- You Will Own Nothing and You Will Be Happy #1-4 (2023-present), self-published series
- Quality Pictures (2023), 52 pages, edition of 800 - an anthology edited by Hanselmann and Josh Pettinger produced for Short Run Seattle 2023
- The Werewolf Jones Guide To Parenting (2023), with Josh Pettinger, edition of 2000, booklet included with pre-order of The Werewolf Jones & Sons Deluxe Summer Fun Annual
- Werewolf Jones and Sons Summer Camp Flier (2025), included with webstore orders
- Boys in Prison (2025), 36 pages, self-published minicomic
- Being Alive (2026), self-published minicomic
- Truth Zone 2026 Digest (2026), 72 pages, self-published minicomic

=== Books ===
- Megahex (2014), Fantagraphics Books, ISBN 978-1606997437
- Megg & Mogg in Amsterdam (And Other Stories) (2016), Fantagraphics Books, ISBN 978-1606998793
  - Includes "St. Owl's Bay" and more
- One More Year (2017), Fantagraphics Books, ISBN 978-1-60699-997-4
  - Portions of this collection previously appeared as/in "Life Zone," "Worst Behaviour," "Dome," "Drone," on Vice.com, and in self-published minis
- Bad Gateway (2019), Fantagraphics Books, ISBN 978-1-68396-207-6
- Seeds and Stems (2020), Fantagraphics Books, ISBN 978-1-68396-309-7
  - Collects zines, self-published comics, and anthology contributions including "Performance," "Megg, Mog & Penguins," "Megahex 2020 Winter Trauma Annual," "Drone," "Apartments," "Lucidity," "XMP-165," "Hard Rubbish," "Landscape," "Knife Crime," "Entertainment," "Werewolf Jones & Sons" issues 2 and 3, "Romance," and others
- Crisis Zone (2021), Fantagraphics Books, ISBN 978-1-68396-444-5
- Below Ambition (2022), Fantagraphics Books, ISBN 978-1-68396-549-7
  - Portions originally appeared in different form in the 2020 zine also titled Below Ambition
- Werewolf Jones & Sons Deluxe Summer Fun Annual (2023), Fantagraphics Books, ISBN 978-1-68396-771-2, with Josh Pettinger
- Hypnotic Midday Movie: The Art of Simon Hanselmann (2023), Mansion Press, ISBN 978-2-49264-619-5
- Megahex Perfect Edition: Volume One (2027), Fantagraphics Books, ISBN 9798875002274
