= Patrick Horvath =

American film director

- Occupations: artist, director, film producer, writer

Patrick Horvath is an American film producer, writer, director, and the author and illustrator of the IDW horror graphic novel Beneath the Trees Where Nobody Sees and its sequel, Beneath the Trees Where Nobody Sees: Rite of Spring.

Horvarth's films include Entrance, The Pact 2, and Southbound.

== Bibliography ==
Title	Year of Publication	Publisher	Notes
Beneath the Trees Where Nobody Sees	2024	IDW Publishing	In the fictional town of Woodbrook, VT in the year 1986, a serial killer brown bear named Samantha Strong secretly commits murders outside of her hometown and buries her victims in the woods to avoid suspicion. When Woodbrook locals start getting killed in gruesome ways, Sam does her own investigating to catch the perpetrator and prevent her secret double life becoming public knowledge.
Beneath the Trees Where Nobody Sees: Rite of Spring	2025-2026	IDW Publishing	In 1994, a white duck named Monica Brewer has spent eight years searching for her brother, Daniel. When she receives a tip via an online chat room to come to Woodbrook, VT, Monica seizes the opportunity. Upon arriving in Woodbrook, Monica is greeted by Samantha Strong, who has sent the message. Seeking closure, Monica enlists Sam's help, unaware of the brown bear's murderous nature and responsibility for Daniel's death.

== Filmography ==
Film	Year	Director	Producer	Writer	Notes
Die-ner (Get It?)	2009	Yes	No	Yes	
Entrance	2012	Yes	Yes	Yes	
The Pact 2	2014	Yes	No	Yes	
Southbound	2016	Yes	Yes	Yes	"Jailbreak" segment
