= Eisner Award for Best Writer/Artist =

American comic book award

- Awarded for: Best Writer/Artist
- Country: United States
- First award: 1993
- Most recent winner: Jamal Campbell
- Website: www.comic-con.org/awards/eisner-awards/

The Eisner Award for Best Writer/Artist is an award for "creative achievement" in American comic books. It has been given out every year since 1993.

== History and Name Change ==
From the creation of the Eisner Awards in 1988 to 1992 an award titled "Best Writer/Artist (Team or Individual)" was presented. In 1993 this was split into "Best Writer/Artist" (which continues to present) and "Best Writer-Artist Team" (which was only awarded once). In 1996 the award was renamed to "Best Writer/Artist Drama" and a separate award for "Best Writer/Artist Humor" was created. In 1999 the award was changed back to "Best Writer/Artist." The award for "Best Writer/Artist—Humor" was presented until 2008. The award for Best Writer/Artist—Nonfiction was given out once, in 2010.

== Winners and nominees ==
| Year | Nominees | Titles | Ref. |
|---|---|---|---|
| 1993 | Frank Miller | "Sin City" in Dark Horse Presents (Dark Horse Comics) | |
| 1993 | Michael D. Allred | Madman (Tundra Publishing) | |
| 1993 | Peter Bagge | Hate (Fantagraphics) | |
| 1993 | Eddie Campbell | Deadface (Dark Horse Comics), The Eyeball Kid (Dark Horse Comics) | |
| 1993 | Dan Clowes | Eightball (Fantagraphics) | |
| 1993 | Roberta Gregory | Naughty Bits (Fantagraphics) | |
| 1993 | Mark Schultz | Xenozoic Tales (Kitchen Sink Press) | |
| 1993 | Jeff Smith | Bone (Cartoon Books) | |
| 1993 | Bryan Talbot | "Mask" in Batman: Legends of the Dark Knight (DC Comics) | |
| 1993 | Matt Wagner | "Faces" in Batman: Legends of the Dark Knight (DC Comics) | |
| 1994 | Jeff Smith | Bone (Cartoon Books) | |
| 1994 | Phil Foglio | XXXenophile (Palliard Press) | |
| 1994 | Roberta Gregory | Naughty Bits (Fantagraphics) | |
| 1994 | Stan Sakai | Usagi Yojimbo (Fantagraphics/Mirage Studios) | |
| 1994 | William Van Horn | Walt Disney's Comics and Stories (Gladstone Publishing) and Donald Duck Adventures (Gladstone Publishing) | |
| 1995 | Mike Mignola | Hellboy: Seed of Destruction (Dark Horse Comics/Legend Comics) | |
| 1995 | Paul Chadwick | Concrete: Killer Smile (Dark Horse Comics/Legend Comics) | |
| 1995 | Jason Lutes | Jar of Fools (Penny Dreadful Press) | |
| 1995 | Terry Moore | Strangers in Paradise (Abstract Studio) | |
| 1995 | Bryan Talbot | The Tale of One Bad Rat (Dark Horse Comics) | |
| 1996 (Note: From 1996 to 1998 the award was renamed to "Best Writer/Artist Drama.") | David Lapham | Stray Bullets (El Capitán Books) | |
| 1996 | Charles Burns | Black Hole (Kitchen Sink Press) | |
| 1996 | Howard Cruse | Stuck Rubber Baby (Paradox Press) | |
| 1996 | Will Eisner | Dropsie Avenue: The Neighborhood (Kitchen Sink Press) | |
| 1996 | Joe Sacco | Palestine (Fantagraphics) | |
| 1996 | Osamu Tezuka | Adolf: A Tale of the Twentieth Century (Cadence Books) | |
| 1997 | Mike Mignola | Hellboy: Wake the Devil (Dark Horse Comics/Legend Comics) | |
| 1997 | Paul Grist | Kane (Dancing Elephant Press) | |
| 1997 | Joe Kubert | Fax from Sarajevo (Dark Horse Comics) | |
| 1997 | Stan Sakai | Usagi Yojimbo (Dark Horse Comics) | |
| 1997 | Osamu Tezuka | Adolf graphic novel series(Cadence Books) | |
| 1998 | Mike Mignola | Hellboy: Almost Colossus, Hellboy Christmas Special, Hellboy Junior Halloween Special (Dark Horse Comics) | |
| 1998 | Dan Clowes | Eightball (Fantagraphics) | |
| 1998 | Rick Geary | The Borden Tragedy (NBM Publishing) | |
| 1998 | Vittorio Giardino | A Jew in Communist Prague (NBM Publishing) | |
| 1998 | David Lapham | Stray Bullets, Amy Racecar Color Special #1 (El Capitán Books) | |
| 1998 | Jason Lutes | Berlin (Black Eye Productions) | |
| 1998 | Linda Medley | Castle Waiting (Olio Press) | |
| 1999 | Frank Miller | 300 (Dark Horse Comics) | |
| 1999 | Alan Davis | JLA: The Nail (DC Comics) | |
| 1999 | Will Eisner | A Family Matter (Kitchen Sink Press) | |
| 1999 | David Lapham | Stray Bullets (El Capitán Books) | |
| 1999 | Stan Sakai | Usagi Yojimbo (Dark Horse Comics) | |
2000s
| 2000 | Dan Clowes | Eightball (Fantagraphics) | |
| 2000 | André Juillard | After the Rain (NBM Publishing) | |
| 2000 | David Lapham | Stray Bullets, Amy Racecar Special #2 (El Capitán Books) | |
| 2000 | Bryan Talbot | Heart of Empire (Dark Horse Comics) | |
| 2000 | Chris Ware | Acme Novelty Library (Fantagraphics) | |
| 2001 | Eric Shanower | Age of Bronze (Image Comics) | |
| 2001 | Kaiji Kawaguchi | Eagle: The Making of an Asian-American President (Viz Media) | |
| 2001 | Jason Lutes | Berlin (Drawn & Quarterly) | |
| 2001 | Joe Sacco | Safe Area Goražde (Fantagraphics) | |
| 2001 | Yslaire | From Cloud 99: Memories, Part I (Humanoids Publishing) | |
| 2002 | Dan Clowes | Eightball (Fantagraphics) | |
| 2002 | Jessica Abel | La Perdida (Fantagraphics) | |
| 2002 | Carla Speed McNeil | Finder (Lightspeed Press) | |
| 2002 | James Sturm | The Golem's Mighty Swing (Drawn & Quarterly) | |
| 2002 | Adrian Tomine | Optic Nerve (Drawn & Quarterly) | |
| 2003 | Eric Shanower | Age of Bronze (Image Comics) | |
| 2003 | Jessica Abel | La Perdida (Fantagraphics) | |
| 2003 | Patrick Atangan | The Yellow Jar (NBM Publishing) | |
| 2003 | Lynda Barry | One! Hundred! Demons! (Sasquatch Books) | |
| 2003 | Carla Speed McNeil | Finder (Lightspeed Press) | |
| 2004 | Craig Thompson | Blankets (Top Shelf Productions) | |
| 2004 | Jaime Hernández | Love and Rockets (Fantagraphics) | |
| 2004 | Paul Hornschemeier | Forlorn Funnies (Absence of Ink) | |
| 2004 | Takehiko Inoue | Vagabond (Viz Media) | |
| 2004 | Paul Pope | Giant THB v.2 #1 (Horse Press) | |
| 2005 | Paul Chadwick | Concrete: The Human Dilemma (Dark Horse Comics) | |
| 2005 | Dan Clowes | Eightball (Fantagraphics) | |
| 2005 | David Lapham | Stray Bullets (El Capitán Books) | |
| 2005 | Stan Sakai | Usagi Yojimbo (Dark Horse Comics) | |
| 2005 | Adrian Tomine | Optic Nerve #9 (Drawn & Quarterly) | |
| 2006 | Geof Darrow | Shaolin Cowboy (Burlyman Entertainment) | |
| 2006 | Guy Delisle | Pyongyang: A Journey in North Korea (Drawn & Quarterly) | |
| 2006 | Eric Shanower | Age of Bronze (Image Comics) | |
| 2006 | Adrian Tomine | Optic Nerve #10 (Drawn & Quarterly) | |
| 2006 | Chris Ware | Acme Novelty Library #16 (Acme Novelty Library) | |
| 2007 | Paul Pope | Batman: Year 100 (DC Comics) | |
| 2007 | Alison Bechdel | Fun Home (Houghton Mifflin) | |
| 2007 | Renée French | The Ticking (Top Shelf Productions) | |
| 2007 | Gilbert Hernández | Love and Rockets, New Tales of Old Palomar (Fantagraphics), Sloth (Vertigo Comics/DC Comics) | |
| 2007 | Joann Sfar | Klezmer, Vampire Loves (First Second Books) | |
| 2008 | Chris Ware | Acme Novelty Library #18 (Acme Novelty Library) | |
| 2008 | Jeff Lemire | Essex County: Tales from the Farm, Essex County:Ghost Stories (Top Shelf Productions) | |
| 2008 | Rutu Modan | Exit Wounds (Drawn & Quarterly) | |
| 2008 | Shaun Tan | The Arrival (Arthur A. Levine/Scholastic) | |
| 2008 | Fumi Yoshinaga | Flower of Life (Digital Manga Publishing), The Moon and the Sandals (Digital Manga Publishing) | |
| 2009 | Chris Ware | Acme Novelty Library (Acme Novelty Library) | |
| 2009 | Rick Geary | A Treasury of XXth Century Murder: The Lindbergh Child (NBM Publishing), J. Edgar Hoover: A Graphic Biography (Hill & Wang) | |
| 2009 | Emmanuel Guibert | Alan's War (First Second Books) | |
| 2009 | Jason Lutes | Berlin (Drawn & Quarterly) | |
| 2009 | Cyril Pedrosa | Three Shadows (First Second Books) | |
| 2009 | Nate Powell | Swallow Me Whole (Top Shelf Productions) | |
2010s
| 2010 | David Mazzucchelli | Asterios Polyp (Pantheon Books) | |
| 2010 | Darwyn Cooke | Richard Stark's Parker: The Hunter (IDW Publishing) | |
| 2010 | R. Crumb | The Book of Genesis Illustrated (W. W. Norton & Company) | |
| 2010 | Terry Moore | Echo (Abstract Studio) | |
| 2010 | Naoki Urasawa | 20th Century Boys (Viz Media), Pluto: Urasawa x Tezuka (Viz Media) | |
| 2011 | Darwyn Cooke | Richard Stark's Parker: The Outfit (IDW Publishing) | |
| 2011 | Daniel Clowes | Wilson (Drawn & Quarterly) | |
| 2011 | Joe Kubert | Dong Xoai, Vietnam 1965 (DC Comics) | |
| 2011 | Terry Moore | Echo (Abstract Studio) | |
| 2011 | James Sturm | Market Day (Drawn & Quarterly) | |
| 2011 | Naoki Urasawa | 20th Century Boys (Viz Media) | |
| 2012 | Craig Thompson | Habibi (Pantheon Books) | |
| 2012 | Rick Geary | The Lives of Sacco and Vanzetti (NBM Publishing) | |
| 2012 | Terry Moore | Rachel Rising (Abstract Studio) | |
| 2012 | Sarah Oleksyk | Ivy (Oni Press) | |
| 2012 | Jim Woodring | Congress of the Animals (Fantagraphics), "Harvest of Fear" in "The Simpson's Treehouse of Horror" #17, (Bongo Comics) | |
| 2013 | Chris Ware | Building Stories (Pantheon Books) | |
| 2013 | Charles Burns | The Hive (Pantheon Books) | |
| 2013 | Gilbert Hernández | Love and Rockets New Stories, vol. 5 (Fantagraphics) | |
| 2013 | Jaime Hernández | Love and Rockets New Stories, vol. 5 (Fantagraphics) | |
| 2013 | Luke Pearson | Hilda and the Midnight Giant (Nobrow Press), Everything We Miss (Nobrow Press) | |
| 2013 | C. Tyler | You'll Never Know, Book 3: A Soldier's Heart (Fantagraphics) | |
| 2014 | Jaime Hernández | Love and Rockets New Stories #6 (Fantagraphics) | |
| 2014 | Isabel Greenberg | The Encyclopedia of Early Earth (Little, Brown and Company) | |
| 2014 | Terry Moore | Rachel Rising (Abstract Studio) | |
| 2014 | Luke Pearson | Hilda and the Bird Parade (Nobrow Press) | |
| 2014 | Matt Phelan | Bluffton: My Summers with Buster (Candlewick Press) | |
| 2014 | Judith Vanistendael | When David Lost His Voice (SelfMadeHero) | |
| 2015 | Raina Telgemeier | Sisters (Graphix/Scholastic) | |
| 2015 | Sergio Aragonés | Sergio Aragonés Funnies (Bongo Comics), Groo vs. Conan (Dark Horse Comics) | |
| 2015 | Charles Burns | Sugar Skull (Pantheon Books) | |
| 2015 | Stephen Collins | The Giant Beard That Was Evil (Picador) | |
| 2015 | Richard McGuire | Here (Pantheon Books) | |
| 2015 | Stan Sakai | Usagi Yojimbo: Senso (Dark Horse Comics), Usagi Yojimbo Color Special: The Artist (Dark Horse Comics) | |
| 2016 | Bill Griffith | Invisible Ink: My Mother's Secret Love Affair with a Famous Cartoonist (Fantagraphics) | |
| 2016 | Nathan Hale | Nathan Hale's Hazardous Tales: The Underground Abductor (Abrams ComicArts) | |
| 2016 | Sydney Padua | The Thrilling Adventures of Lovelace and Babbage (Pantheon Books) | |
| 2016 | Ed Piskor | Hip Hop Family Tree, vol. 3 (Fantagraphics) | |
| 2016 | Noah Van Sciver | Fante Bukowski (Fantagraphics), Saint Cole (Fantagraphics) | |
| 2017 | Sonny Liew | The Art of Charlie Chan Hock Chye (Pantheon Books) | |
| 2017 | Jessica Abel | Trish Trash: Rollergirl of Mars (Papercutz/Super Genius) | |
| 2017 | Box Brown | Tetris: The Games People Play (First Second Books) | |
| 2017 | Tom Gauld | Mooncop (Drawn & Quarterly) | |
| 2017 | Tom Hart | Rosalie Lightning: A Graphic Memoir (St. Martin's Press) | |
| 2018 | Emil Ferris | My Favorite Thing Is Monsters (Fantagraphics) | |
| 2018 | Lorena Alvarez | Nightlights (Nobrow Press) | |
| 2018 | Chabouté | Moby Dick (Dark Horse Comics), Alone (Gallery 13/Simon & Schuster), The Park Bench (Gallery 13/Simon & Schuster) | |
| 2018 | Cathy Malkasian | Eartha (Fantagraphics) | |
| 2018 | Jiro Taniguchi | Furari (Fanfare/Ponent Mon), Louis Vuitton Travel Guide: Venice (Fanfare/Ponent Mon) | |
| 2019 | Jen Wang | The Prince and the Dressmaker (First Second Books) | |
| 2019 | Sophie Campbell | Wet Moon (Oni Press) | |
| 2019 | Nick Drnaso | Sabrina (Drawn & Quarterly) | |
| 2019 | David Lapham | Lodger (Black Crown/IDW Publishing), Stray Bullets (Image Comics) | |
| 2019 | Nate Powell | Come Again (Top Shelf Productions/IDW Publishing) | |
| 2019 | Tony Sandoval | Watersnakes (Magnetic Press/Lion Forge Comics) | |
2020s
| 2020 | Raina Telgemeier | Guts (Scholastic Graphix) | |
| 2020 | Nina Bunjevac | Bezimena (Fantagraphics) | |
| 2020 | Mira Jacob | Good Talk (Random House), “The Menopause” in The Believer, June 1, 2019 | |
| 2020 | Keum Suk Gendry-Kim | Grass (Drawn & Quarterly) | |
| 2020 | James Stokoe | Sobek (ShortBox) | |
| 2020 | Tillie Walden | Are You Listening? (First Second Books/Macmillan Publishers) | |
| 2021 | Junji Ito | Remina (Viz Media), Venus in the Blind Spot (Viz Media) | |
| 2021 | Pascal Jousselin | Mister Invincible: Local Hero (Magnetic Press) | |
| 2021 | Trung Le Nguyen | The Magic Fish (Random House Graphic) | |
| 2021 | Craig Thompson | Ginseng Roots (Uncivilized Books) | |
| 2021 | Adrian Tomine | The Loneliness of the Long-Distance Cartoonist (Drawn & Quarterly) | |
| 2021 | Gene Luen Yang | Dragon Hoops (First Second Books/Macmillan Publishers) | |
| 2022 | Barry Windsor-Smith | Monsters (Fantagraphics) | |
| 2022 | Alison Bechdel | The Secret to Superhuman Strength (Mariner Books) | |
| 2022 | Junji Ito | Deserter: Junji Ito Story Collection (Viz Media), Lovesickness: Junji Ito Story Collection (Viz Media), Sensor (Viz Media) | |
| 2022 | Daniel Warren Johnson | "Generations" in Superman: Red and Blue (DC Comics), Beta Ray Bill (Marvel Comics) | |
| 2022 | Will McPhail | In: A Graphic Novel (Mariner Books) | |
| 2023 | Kate Beaton | Ducks: Two Years in the Oil Sands (Drawn & Quarterly) | |
| 2023 | Sarah Andersen | Cryptid Club (Andrews McMeel Publishing) | |
| 2023 | Espé | The Pass (Graphic Mundi/Penn State University Press) | |
| 2023 | Junji Ito | Black Paradox (Viz Media), The Liminal Zone (Viz Media) | |
| 2023 | Zoe Thorogood | It's Lonely at the Centre of the Earth (Image Comics) | |
| 2024 | Daniel Warren Johnson | Transformers (Image Comics/Skybound Entertainment) | |
| 2024 | Emily Carroll | A Guest in the House (First Second Books/Macmillan Publishers) | |
| 2024 | Bill Griffith | Three Rocks: The Story of Ernie Bushmiller: The Man Who Created Nancy (Abrams ComicArts) | |
| 2024 | Mokumokuren | The Summer Hikaru Died, vol. 1 (Yen Press) | |
| 2024 | Zoe Thorogood | Hack/Slash: Back To School (Image Comics) | |
| 2024 | Tillie Walden | Clementine Book Two (Image Comics/Skybound Entertainment) | |
| 2025 | Charles Burns | Kommix (Fantagraphics), Final Cut, (Pantheon Books, Unwholesome Love (Partners & Son) | |
| 2025 | Emil Ferris | My Favorite Thing Is Monsters Book Two (Fantagraphics) | |
| 2025 | Jon Macy | Djuna: The Extraordinary Life of Djuna Barnes (Street Noise Books) | |
| 2025 | Paco Roca | Return to Eden (Fantagraphics) | |
| 2025 | Olivier Schrauwen | Sunday (Fantagraphics) | |
| 2026 | Jamal Campbell | Zatanna (DC) | |
| 2026 | Juni Ba | The Boy Wonder (DC); The Fable of Erkling Woods (Goats Flying Press); Monkey Meat Summer Batch (Image) | |
| 2026 | Jesse Lonergan | Drome (23rd St. Books) | |
| 2026 | Chang Sheng | Yan, vols. 1–2 (Titan Manga) | |
| 2026 | Linnea Sterte | A Garden of Spheres (Peow2) | |
| 2026 | Kazumi Yamashita | Land, vol. 1 (Yen Press) | |

== Best Writer/Artist–Nonfiction ==
The Eisner Award for Best Writer/Artist—Nonfiction was an award for "creative achievement" in American comic books. It was only given out once, in 2010.

| Year | Nominees | Titles | Ref. |
|---|---|---|---|
| 2010 | Joe Sacco | Footnotes in Gaza (Metropolitan Books/Henry Holt and Company) | |
| 2010 | Reinhard Kleist | Johnny Cash: I See a Darkness (Abrams ComicArts) | |
| 2010 | Willy Linthout | Years of the Elephant (Fanfare/Ponent Mon) | |
| 2010 | David Small | Stitches (W. W. Norton & Company) | |
| 2010 | Carol Tyler | You’ll Never Know: A Good and Decent Man (Fantagraphics) | |
