= Emil Ferris =

American-Lebanese writer, cartoonist, and designer

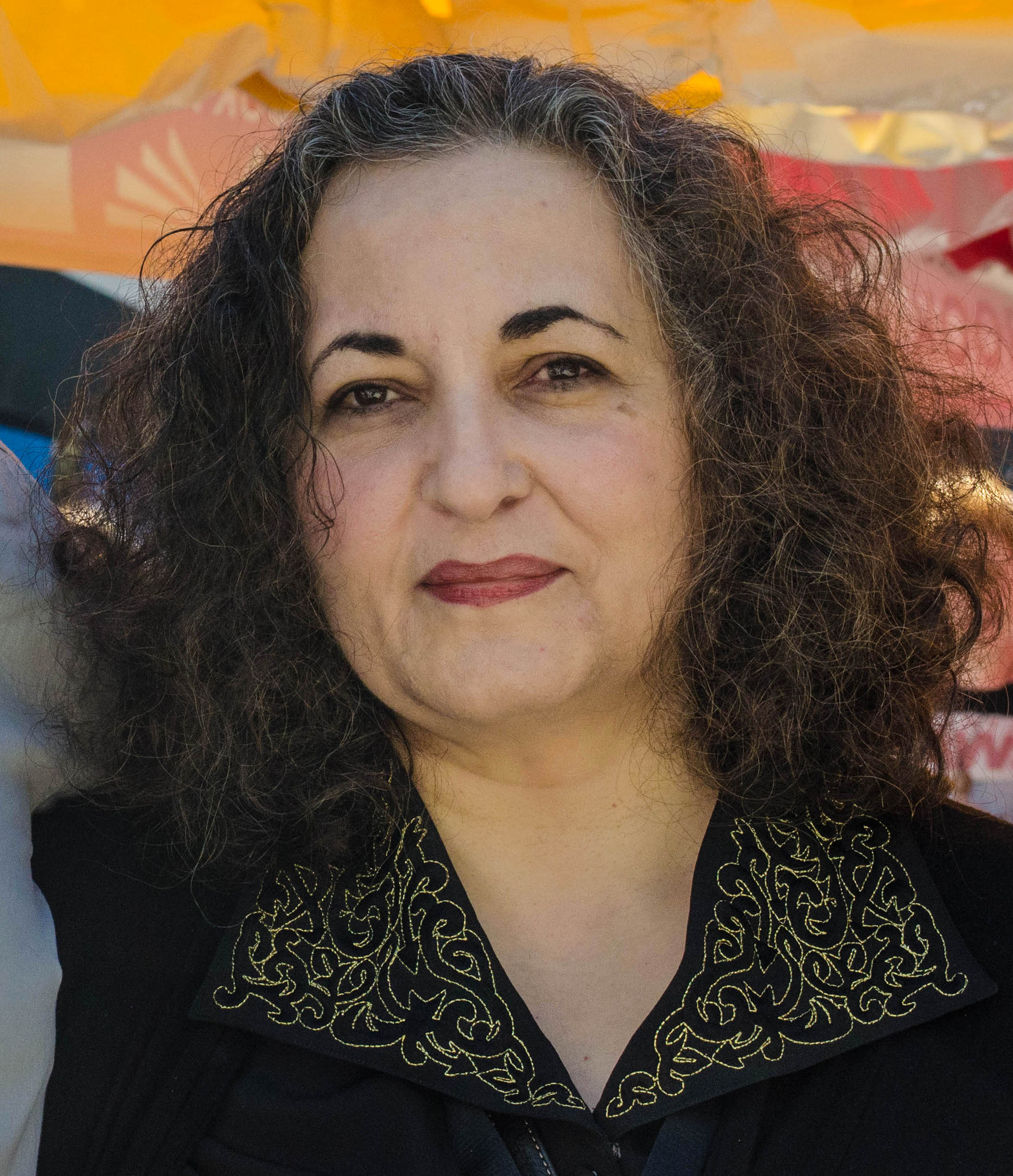
- Ferris at Miami Book Fair 2016
- Born: 1962 (age 63–64); Chicago, Illinois
- Education: School of the Art Institute of Chicago (SAIC) (BFA, MFA)
- Known for: Graphic novels, writing
- Notable work: My Favorite Thing Is Monsters

Emil Ferris (born 1962) is an American writer, cartoonist, and designer. Ferris debuted in publishing with her 2017 graphic novel My Favorite Thing Is Monsters, which was praised as a "masterpiece" and one of the best comics by a new author.

== Biography ==
Emil Ferris was born to Eleanor Spiess-Ferris and Mike Ferris on Chicago's South Side and grew up in the North Side's Uptown neighborhood. Her parents are artists who met at the School of the Art Institute of Chicago, and she would often visit the Art Institute of Chicago with them.

Ferris traces her Hispanic lineage from Indigenous Mexico to Spain, German, French, Irish emigres, and Sephardic Jewish descent from her mother's side and is also of Lebanese descent from her father's side.

Ferris' mother took diethylstilbestrol when pregnant, leading Ferris to say she was biologically male but transformed to female in utero, and she therefore identifies with others who have gender dysphoria. Ferris identified early in her life as a lesbian but later on came to see herself as bisexual.

She was sexually abused as a child, which she says negatively affected her ability to draw in a cartoon style for many years.

This was the '60s. I watched protests being broken up by the police. I saw bigotry. It made me think about our own inner monstrousness.

— Emil Ferris

Ferris was obsessed with monsters as a child, eagerly looking forward to Creature Features on Saturday nights, which had monsters she would weep for. Ferris had scoliosis, and to get attention on the playground, she told horror stories. Ferris has discussed how she saw herself as a child: observing the oppressive social role her beautiful mother, as well as other humans, had to play.

As a child, Ferris was part of a theatrical troupe near the Graceland Cemetery — which she visited, hoping to find monsters or a ghost. Ferris gained an understanding of World War II by talking to Holocaust survivors who lived in the neighborhood of Rogers Park, which she had moved to. She would visit the owner of a gallery who had an identification number tattoo, as well as elderly survivors, forming a connection between their experiences and monsters.

In 2001, when she was 40, Ferris contracted West Nile fever from a mosquito bite. Three weeks after going to the hospital, she was paralyzed from the waist down and lost movement in her right hand. She eventually regained motor functionality and returned to working and drawing, receiving a MFA in creative writing from the School of the Art Institute of Chicago.

== Artistic influences ==
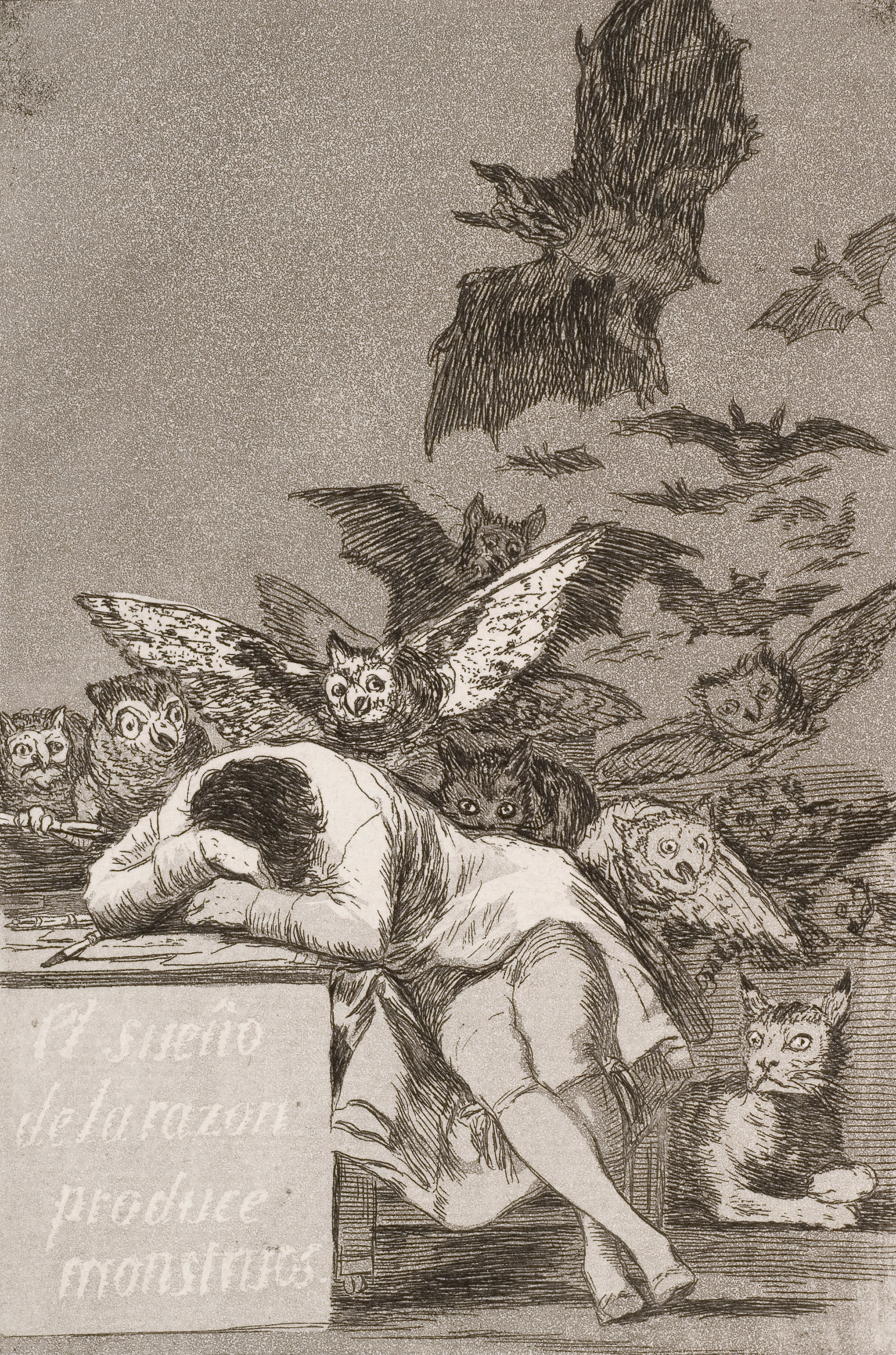
Francisco Goya was a childhood influence on Ferris. Pictured is his etching, The Sleep of Reason Produces Monsters.

In terms of artistic influences, Ferris was exposed to the works of Francisco Goya and Honoré Daumier as a child, as well as Collier's illustrated Dickens. Cartoonists who were inspirations for her include Robert Crumb, Alison Bechdel, and Art Spiegelman. She has also cited horror film posters and stories from EC Comics as ideas for the mock covers she drew in My Favorite Thing is Monsters.

== Career ==
Ferris discussing My Favorite Thing Is Monsters with Michael Cavna at Small Press Expo 2017

Ferris worked as a freelance illustrator and toy designer for clients such as McDonald's and Takara Tomy before becoming an author.

While recovering from the paralysis caused by West Nile fever, Ferris worked on her graphic novel. My Favorite Thing Is Monsters tells the story of Karen Reyes, a 10-year-old girl and fan of monster movies (like Ferris herself) who, growing up amidst the social tensions of 1960s Chicago, investigates the death of her upstairs neighbor. The book is written and drawn in the form of Reyes' diary notebook, with crosshatched artwork drawn with a ballpoint pen.

The 400-page My Favorite Thing is Monsters (volume one) was released in 2017 by Fantagraphics, receiving praise from authors like Art Spiegelman, Alison Bechdel, and Chris Ware; it was regarded as one of the best comics of 2017. My Favorite Thing is Monsters volume two was released on May 24, 2024.

In April 2022, Ferris was reported among the more than three dozen comics creators who contributed to Operation USA's benefit anthology book, Comics for Ukraine: Sunflower Seeds, a project spearheaded by editor Scott Dunbier, whose profits would be donated to relief efforts for Ukrainian refugees resulting from the February 2022 Russian invasion of Ukraine.

== Personal life ==
When Ferris contracted West Nile virus at age 40, she was the single mother of a six-year-old daughter named Ruby.

== Awards ==
- 2017 Ignatz Award for Outstanding Graphic Novel for My Favorite Thing Is Monsters
- 2017 Ignatz Award for Outstanding Artist
- 2017 National Cartoonists Society Silver Reuben Graphic Novels Award for My Favorite Thing Is Monsters
- 2018 Eisner Award for Best Writer/Artist
- 2018 Eisner Award for Best Graphic Album—New for My Favorite Thing Is Monsters
- 2018 Lambda Literary Award for LGBTQ Graphic Novel for My Favorite Thing Is Monsters
- 2018 Lynd Ward Prize for best graphic novel of the year for My Favorite Thing Is Monsters
- 2018 Ringo Award for Best Original Graphic Novel for My Favorite Thing Is Monsters
- 2019 Grand prix de la critique ACBD
- 2019 Fauve d'or at FIBD 2019
- 2019 Premi a la millor obra estrangera (Best Foreign Work) at the 37th Edition of Saló del Còmic de Barcelona for My Favorite Thing Is Monsters.
- 2020 Eisner Award for Best Single Issue/One-Shot for Our Favorite Thing Is My Favorite Thing Is Monsters: Free Comic Book Day 2019
- 2020 Eisner Award for Best Anthology for Drawing Power: Women's Stories of Sexual Violence, Harassment, and Survival: A Comics Anthology
- 2020 Prêmio Grampo Ouro (Gold) for Minha Coisa Favorita É Monstro (My Favorite Thing Is Monsters)
- 2024 Eisner Award for Best Anthology for Comics for Ukraine
- 2025 Whiting Award in Fiction
- 2025, Inkpot Award
