= Brian Biggs =

American children's book author and illustrator

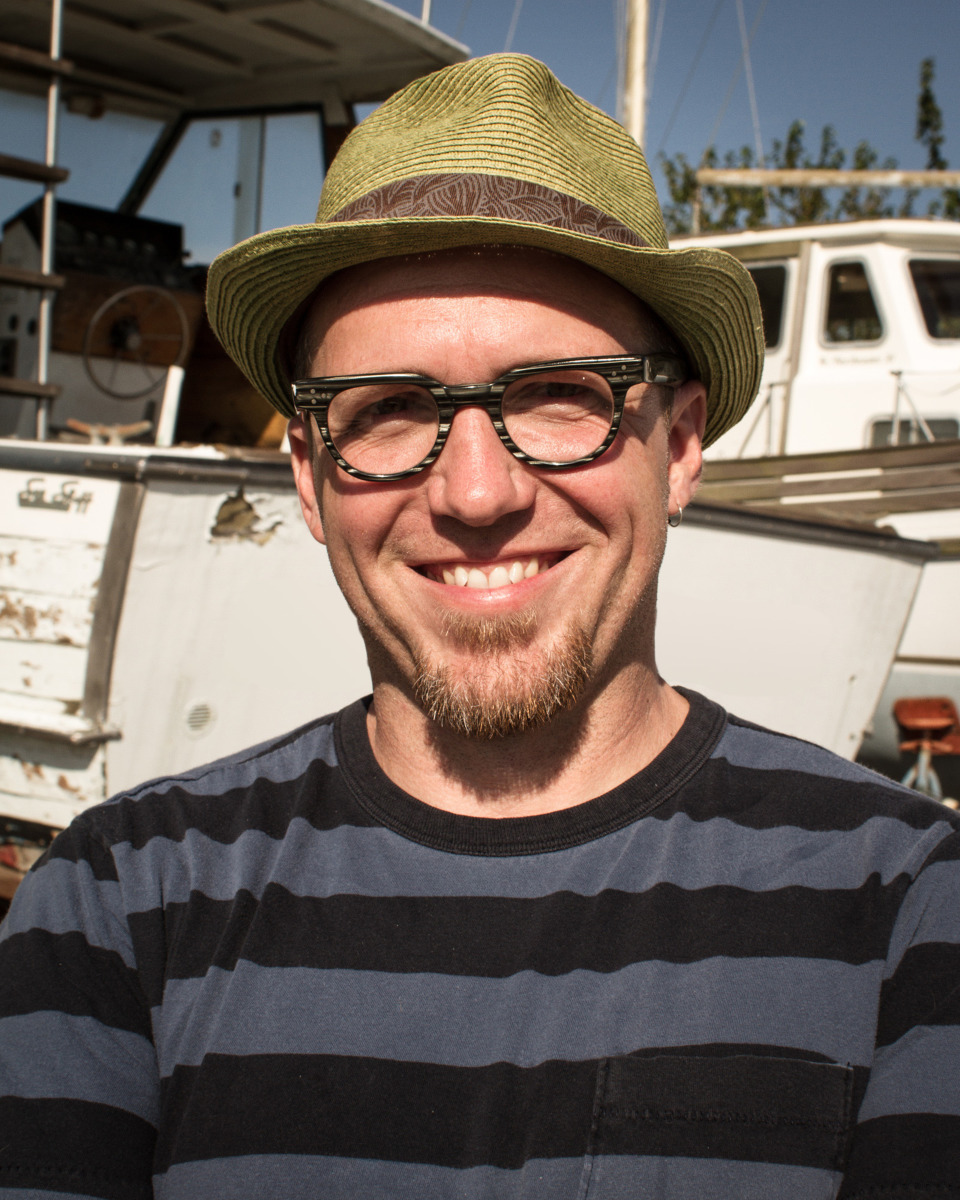
- Biggs in 2013
- Born: Brian Michael Biggs; March 9, 1968 (age 58); Little Rock, Arkansas
- Website: mrbiggs.com

Brian Biggs (born March 9, 1968, in Little Rock, Arkansas) is a children's book author and illustrator. He has been published by HarperCollins and Random House, among others, and has illustrated two Little Golden Books.

== Early work ==
Brian Biggs got his start as a cartoonist for the North Texas Daily, the school newspaper of the North Texas State University. His comic, Roommates, ran until his transfer to Parsons. Then, in the 1990s, Biggs began to draw comic books, often as a part of the 90's underground comix scene. Notable works from this period include Frederick and Eloise (1999), published by Fantagraphics, and Dear Julia (1996–97), published by Black Eye Productions. Dear Julia was later made into a short film directed by Isaac E. Gozin.

== Children's books ==
The cover of Everything Goes: On Land, showing his distinctive style.

Brian Biggs later began to illustrate for small projects, and eventually illustrated a children's book series, Shredderman, written by Wendelin Van Draanen in 2004–05, which was turned into the Nickelodeon TV film Shredderman Rules. The success of Shredderman led him to do more books, such as the Roscoe Riley Rules book series and Brownie & Pearl, written by Cynthia Rylant. He became known for his distinctive style, with thick, rough outlines and his bright digital coloring.

He has recently written and illustrated his own book series, titled Everything Goes, and is currently the illustrator of Jon Scieszka's book series Frank Einstein. In 2016, the first books of his Tinyville Town series were published.

== Personal life ==
In 1987, Brian Biggs attended North Texas State University, later transferring to the Parsons School of Design. He moved to San Francisco in 1993. He has lived and worked in Philadelphia since 1999.

== Books ==
- Dear Julia, 1996 (Graphic Novel) Black Eye Productions, ISBN 1-891830-12-0
- Frederick & Eloise: A Love Story 1997 (Graphic Novel) Fantagraphics, ISBN 1-56097-096-0
- Un Mode de Transport, 2004 (Book [French]) Éditions du Rouergue, ISBN 2-84156-471-1
- Shredderman series, written by Wendelin Van Draanen—2004-2006 (Children's Novel) Knopf, ISBN 0-375-82351-4, ISBN 0-375-82352-2, ISBN 0-375-82353-0, ISBN 0-375-82354-9
- Goofball Malone series, written by Stephen Mooser (Children's Book) Grosset & Dunlap, ISBN 0-448-43893-3, ISBN 0-448-43894-1
- One Beastly Beast: Two Aliens, Three Inventors, Four Fantastic Tales written by Garth Nix—2007 (Children's Short Story Collection) HarperCollins, ISBN 0-06-084320-9
- Camp Out!: The Ultimate Kids' Guide written by Lynn Brunelle—2007 (Children's Guidebook) Workman Publishing, ISBN 0-7611-4122-7
- Beastly Rhymes to Read After Dark written by Judy Sierra—2008 (Children's Poems) Knopf, ISBN 0-375-83747-7
- Wendelin Van Draanen (24 December 2008). Shredderman: Meet the Gecko. Random House Children's Books. pp. 1–. ISBN 978-0-307-55967-8.
- Everything Goes: Blue Bus, Red Balloon: A Book of Colors, HarperCollins, 2013, ISBN 9780061958144
- Everything Goes: On Land. HarperCollins. 13 September 2011. ISBN 978-0-06-195809-0.
- Everything Goes: By Sea, HarperCollins, 2013, ISBN 9780061958113
- the SPACE WALK, Dial Books for Young Readers, 2019, ISBN 978-0-525-55337-3
