= Christophe Chabouté =

French comics artist

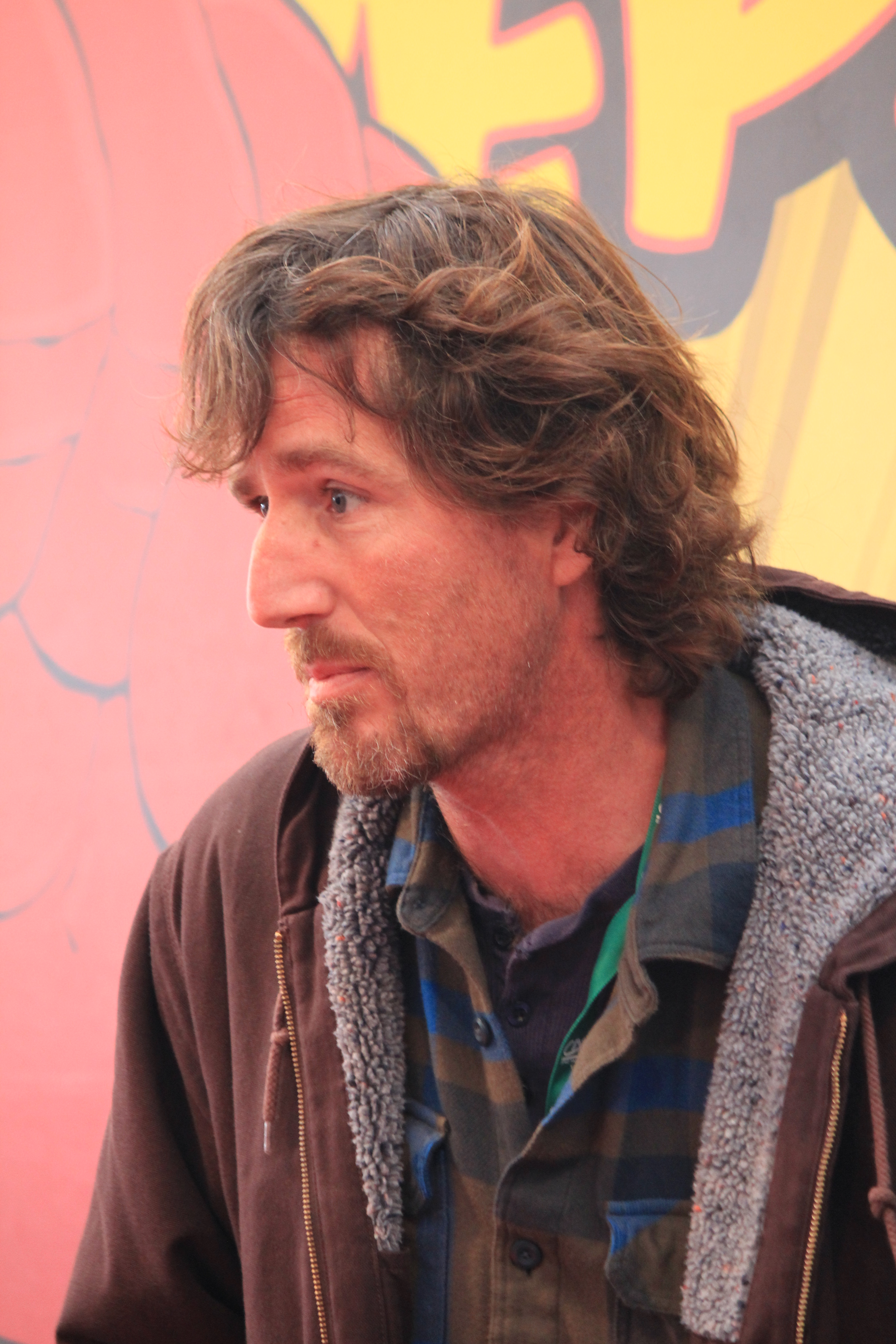
- Christophe Chabouté at Saint-Malo for Quai des Bulles 2012.
- Born: 8 February 1967 (age 59)
- Occupation: Comic book artist

Christophe Chabouté (born 8 February 1967) is a French comics artist.

== Biography ==
Chabouté was born on February 8, 1967; he is of Alsatian heritage. Chabouté attended Fine Arts courses in Angoulême and Strasbourg. The publishing house Vents d'Ouest published his first pieces in 1993 in Les Récits, a collective album about Arthur Rimbaud. But Chabouté became best known in 1998 by publishing Sorcières by Éditions du Téméraire (awarded at the Illzach Festival) and Quelques jours d'été by Editions Paquet (Alph'Art Coup de Coeur Festival Angoulême). He has also illustrated novels for young people. His work Alone (French: Tout seul), which is translated into English by Ivanka Hahnenberger, is considered his masterpiece.

== Works ==
=== Albums ===
- Sorcières, Le Téméraire, 1998 (rééd. Vents d'Ouest, 2001)
- Quelques jours d'été, éditions Paquet, 1998 (rééd. 1999 & 2004)
- Zoé, collection Intégra, Vents d'Ouest, 1999
- Pleine lune, collection Intégra, Vents d'Ouest, 2000
- Un îlot de bonheur, Paquet, 2001
- La bête, collection Intégra, Vents d'Ouest, 2002
- Purgatoire, collection Equinoxe, Vents d'Ouest
1. Livre 1, 2003
2. Livre 2, 2004
3. Livre 3, 2005
- Henri Désiré Landru, collection Intégra, Vents d'Ouest, 2006
- To Build a Fire (Construire un feu), collection Equinoxe, Vents d'Ouest, 2007 – After the 1907 short story by Jack London – Prix Cognac du Meilleur Album "One Shot" 2008
- Alone (Tout seul), Vents d'Ouest, 2008 – (Sélection officielle du Festival d'Angoulême 2009)
- Terre-Neuvas, collection Intégra, Vents d'Ouest, 2009
- Fables Amères, De Tout Petits Riens, Vents d'Ouest, 2010
- Princesses aussi vont au petit coin (Les), Vents d'Ouest, 2011
- The Park Bench (Un peu de bois et d'acier), Vents d'Ouest, 2012
- Moby Dick, Vents d'Ouest – After the 1851 novel by Herman Melville
1. Livre Premier, 2014
2. Livre Second, 2014
- Fables amères, Détails futiles, Vents d'Ouest, 2019
- Yellow Cab, Vents d'Ouest, 2021 – After the book by Benoît Cohen
- Musée, Vents d'Ouest and Musée d'Orsay, 2023
- Plus loin qu'ailleurs, Vents d'Ouest, 2025

=== Illustrations ===
- La chute du corbeau, écrit par Jean-Charles Bernardini, Mango Jeunesse, coll Le cercle magique, 2003

== Adaptations ==
The Park Bench was adapted into a silent black and white 45-minutes film directed by Antonin Le Guay (Sandgate Productions) in 2014. It was partly funded through the crowdfunding platform Kiss Kiss Bank Bank from 2 to 27 June 2014. The funding ended on 134%.

The French music group L'Étrange K and the association Scènes occupation signed in April 2016 an adaptation of the same Chabouté comic strip in "BD-concert" (diffusion of the comic book accompanied by live music).

== Awards ==
- 1999: Alph-Art coup de cœur at festival d'Angoulême for Quelques jours d'été
- 2002: Special mention of the Angoulême jury for Un îlot de bonheur
- 2006: Grand Prix RTL de la bande dessinée for Henri Désiré Landru
- 2010: Prix de la BD polar Expérience - Evene à l'occasion du festival Quais du Polar de Lyon for Terre-Neuvas

== Annexes ==
=== Bibliography ===
- Gaumer, Patrick (2010). "Chabouté, Christophe". Dictionnaire mondial de la BD (in French). Paris: Larousse. pp. 162–163. ISBN 9782035843319.

=== External links ===
- Unofficial site
