= My Favorite Thing Is Monsters =

2017 graphic novel by Emil Ferris

- Cover of volume one
- Date: February 14, 2017 (volume one); May 28, 2024 (volume two)
- Publisher: Fantagraphics

Creative team
- Creator: Emil Ferris

My Favorite Thing Is Monsters is a two-volume debut graphic novel by American writer Emil Ferris. It portrays a young girl named Karen Reyes investigating the death of her neighbor in 1960s Chicago. Ferris started working on the novel after contracting West Nile virus and becoming paralyzed at age forty. She attended the School of the Art Institute of Chicago for writing and began the graphic novel to help her recover in 2010, taking six years to create 700 pages. The work draws on Ferris's childhood growing up in Chicago and her love of monsters and horror media. The process of creating the book was difficult, with Ferris working long hours, living frugally, and encountering publishing setbacks, such as a cancelation by one publisher and the temporary seizure of the first volume's printing at the Panama Canal.

The first volume was published by Fantagraphics on February 14, 2017. The work won the 2017 Ignatz Award for Outstanding Graphic Novel and two 2018 Eisner Awards, and it was nominated for a 2018 Hugo Award. The French edition won the ACBD's Prix de la critique and the Fauve D'Or at the 2019 Angoulême International Comics Festival. My Favorite Thing Is Monsters has received critical acclaim and is considered by many critics to be one of the best graphic novels of 2017.

A related comic that Ferris created for Free Comic Book Day won the 2020 Eisner Award for "Best Single Issue/One-Shot".

The second volume was published in May 2024 by Fantagraphics. In April 2023, Pantheon Books acquired an upcoming prequel titled Records of the Damned.

== Plot ==
=== Volume 1 ===
It is 1968, and 10-year-old Karen Reyes, who lives in Chicago, is a smart and imaginative girl fascinated by monsters, art, and her family. Her mother is a steadfast single parent, and her brother Deeze introduces her to art and horror, though he has a troubled, volatile personality.

Karen investigates the recent suicidal death of her upstairs neighbor, Anka Silverberg, a Holocaust survivor, who she suspects was murdered. Karen adopts a detective persona, observing adults and neighbors to uncover the truth. Her investigation reveals Deeze's dark secret: he killed Anka in a jealous outburst. This revelation leads Karen to confess her own truth about being queer, and despite their hardships, Karen and Deeze support each other.

The novel interweaves Karen's personal story with Anka's haunting history of abuse, survival through Nazi Germany, and post-war trauma. It also explores themes of identity, family, societal issues of the 1960s, and the imaginative refuge Karen finds in monsters and art.

=== Volume 2 ===
Karen continues her investigation, uncovering new and darker aspects of Anka's past, including heroic acts during Nazi Germany revealed through a discovered cassette tape.

Karen additionally grapples with her queer identity, the devastating loss of her mother, and the increasingly troubling behavior and secrets of her brother Deeze. The narrative expands to include new characters, such as Karen's school friend Shelley, with whom she explores her sexuality and the turbulent world around them. The political backdrop is showcased with such scenes as a protest in Grant Park, where Karen encounters police brutality, and social issues such as racism, corruption, and activism are woven into the story.

== Production ==
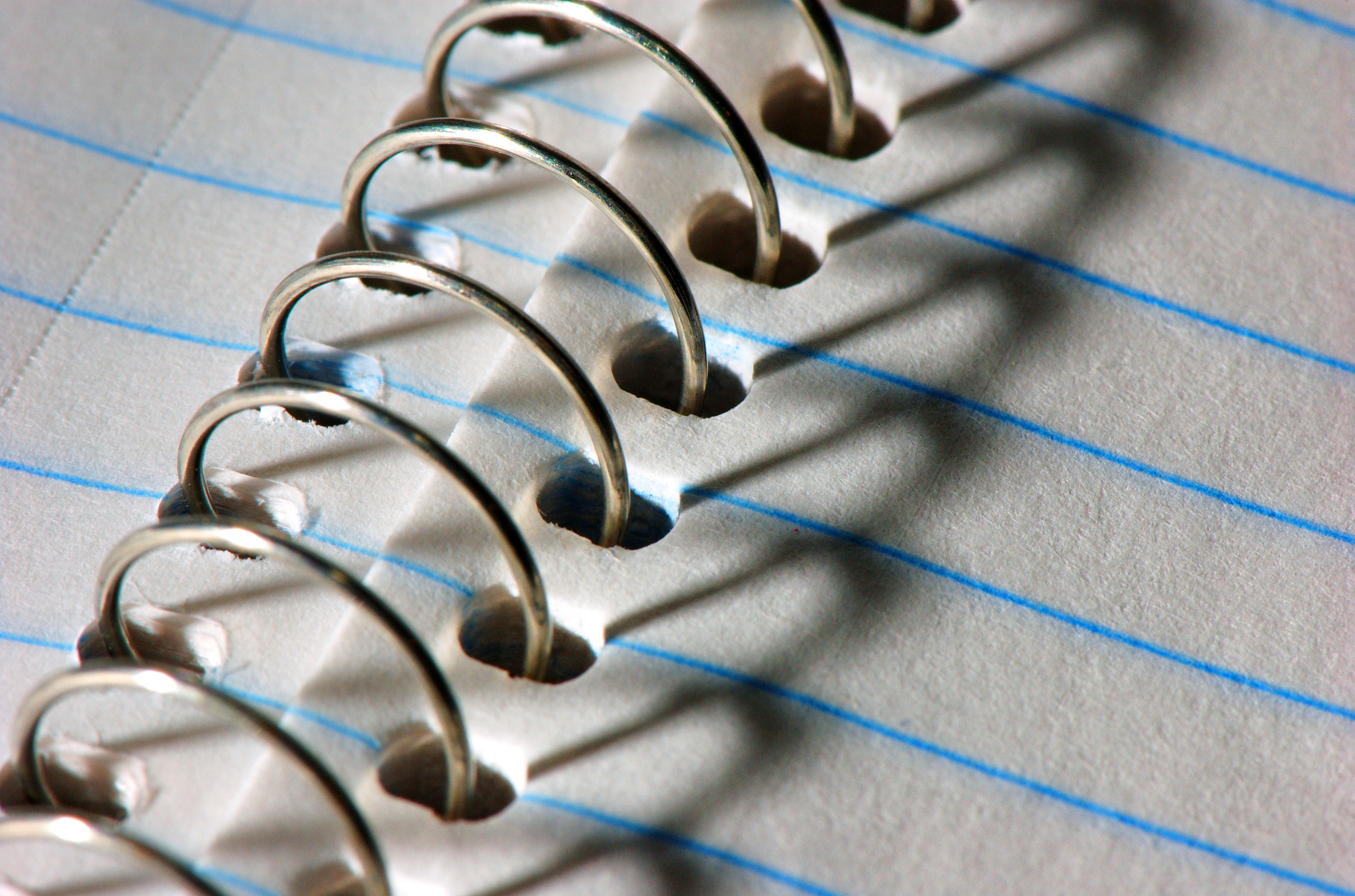
The graphic novel is presented as a personal diary in a lined spiral notebook.

Prior to working in comics, Ferris was a freelance illustrator and toy designer. After contracting West Nile virus at age forty in 2002, Ferris became paralyzed from the waist down and lost the use of her right hand, preventing her from drawing and doing freelance work. The origin for My Favorite Thing Is Monsters was a screenplay Ferris wrote of "a werewolf lesbian girl being enfolded into the protective arms of a Frankenstein trans kid". The theme of two outsiders was then carried over to a short story she wrote in 2004. While attending the School of the Art Institute of Chicago for an M.F.A. in creative writing, Ferris taught herself drawing again and began work on My Favorite Thing Is Monsters to recover. Starting in 2010, it took Ferris six years to complete the manuscript. Her thesis formed the first 24 pages of the graphic novel and secured her a publisher. Ferris often worked sixteen-hour days and lived very frugally while working on the graphic novel. She averaged a rate of around a page every two days. Ferris has said that the process required effort to manipulate her drawing hand properly, which, even after recovery, did not regain the same dexterity.

My Favorite Thing Is Monsters was mainly drawn using a Bic ballpoint pen and the text was written with Paper Mate's felt tip Flair pen. As drawing directly on notebook paper made corrections difficult, Ferris used a drawing layer over a notebook layer. Ferris did not use outlines while drawing, instead letting images that were evoked collect visually in her head. The presentation of the graphic novel as a spiral-bound diary was an autobiographical aspect, with Ferris's classmates always passing around her notebooks. Ferris eschewed panels because she felt that she needed creative freedom and that readers needed a visually dense experience.

== Influences ==
This was the '60s. I watched protests being broken up by the police. I saw bigotry. It made me think about our own inner monstrousness.

— Emil Ferris

Ferris in September 2018 at Festival America in France, presenting My Favorite Thing Is Monsters on the occasion of the publication of its French translation.

Many aspects of the graphic novel are inspired by Ferris's childhood. The author was obsessed with monsters as a child, eagerly looking forward to Creature Features on Saturday nights, which had monsters she would weep for. Ferris had scoliosis, and to get attention on the playground, she told horror stories. The protagonist, Karen's, portrayal as a werewolf reflects how Ferris saw herself as a child—observing the oppressive social role her beautiful mother, as well as other humans, had to play. The graphic novel is set in Chicago during the late 1960s, and Ferris grew up in Chicago's Uptown neighborhood. Her parents were both artists, and she would often visit the Art Institute of Chicago, which is featured in the graphic novel, with them. As a child, Ferris was part of a theatrical troupe near the Graceland Cemetery—which she visited, hoping to find monsters or a ghost—and the graphic novel includes the Eternal Silence sculpture from the cemetery. Ferris gained an understanding of World War II by talking to Holocaust survivors who lived in the neighborhood of Rogers Park, which she had moved to. She would visit the owner of a gallery who had an identification number tattoo, as well as to elderly survivors, forming a connection between their experiences and monsters.

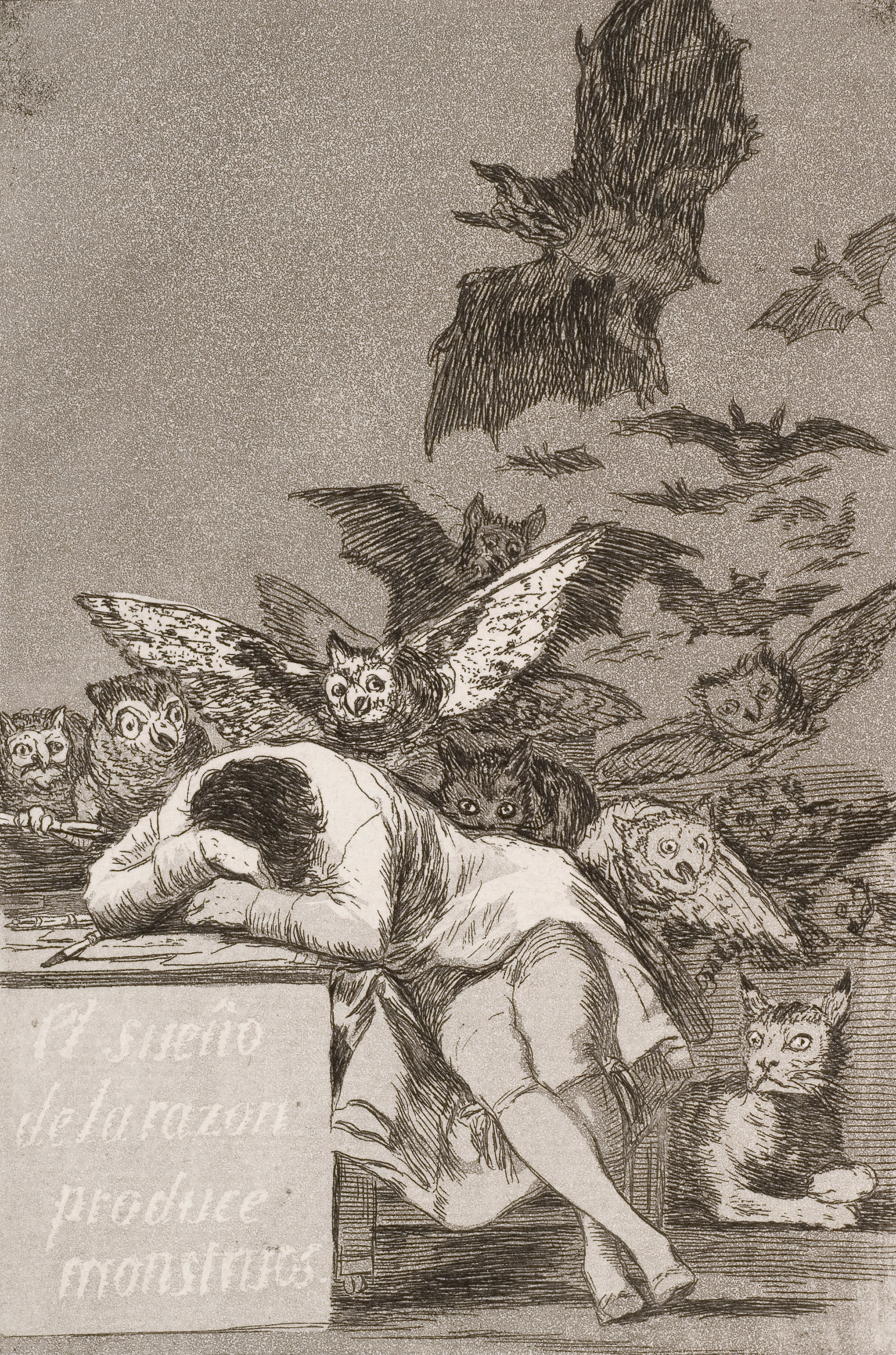
Francisco Goya was a childhood influence on Ferris. Pictured is his etching, The Sleep of Reason Produces Monsters.

In terms of artistic influences, Ferris was exposed to the works of Francisco Goya and Honoré Daumier as a child, as well as Collier's illustrated Dickens. The latter's "articulated and atmospheric" drawings were an experience that Ferris wanted to replicate. Cartoonists who were inspirations for her include Robert Crumb, Alison Bechdel, and Art Spiegelman. She has also cited horror film posters and stories from EC Comics as ideas for the mock covers.

== Publication ==
While halfway through work on My Favorite Thing Is Monsters, Ferris had to find a new publisher when the first one, Other Press, said the book was too long and that they could not properly market it. After receiving 48 rejections for 50 submissions, the graphic novel was picked up by Fantagraphics. The work was originally over 700 pages, but Fantagraphics split it into two volumes to keep the price reasonable. Publication was set for October 31, 2016, to coincide with Halloween. In October, the ship containing the print run of the graphic novel—10,000 copies—was seized at the Panama Canal due to the freight company, Hanjin Shipping, having gone bankrupt. While the ship was released by the Panamanian government later that month, publication was still delayed due to the media campaign being pushed to February 2017, in anticipation of a required reprint. The first volume was published by Fantagraphics on February 14, 2017. In March 2017, the graphic novel received a second print run of 30,000 copies, the largest second printing Fantagraphics had ever done. In March 2017, Sony Pictures won an auction for the film rights to the work, with Amasia Entertainment's Bradley Gallo and Michael Helfant producing. Sam Mendes was in early talks to possibly direct.

On November 3, 2016, in order to raise funds for the second volume of the graphic novel and a new computer, Ferris ran a crowdfunding campaign on GoFundMe, raising $11,000. The second volume was originally slated for an October 2017 release. The novel has also been published in France by Monsieur Toussaint Louverture, in Canada by Éditions Alto, in Italy by Bao Publishing, in Spain by Reservoir Books, and in Germany by Panini. The French version received a limited print run as a hardcover edition by its original publisher.

For Free Comic Book Day on May 5, 2019, Ferris created Our Favorite Thing Is My Favorite Thing Is Monsters. It contained an original sixteen-page monster story as well as the autobiographical "The Bite That Changed My Life" and "How to Draw a Monster".

== Reception ==
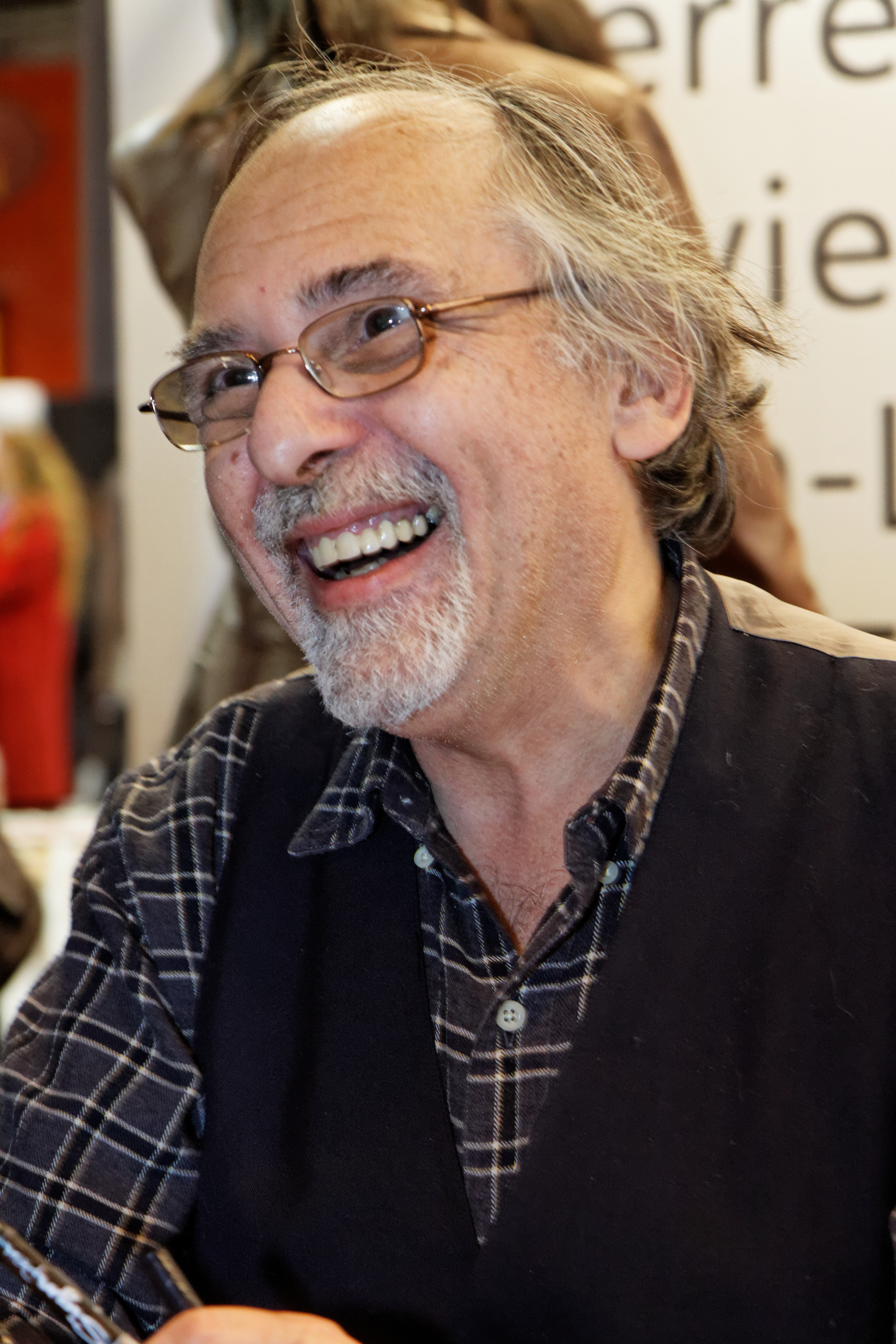
Art Spiegelman, author of Maus, has praised the graphic novel. When Spiegelman—whom Ferris has cited as an influence—told Ferris that he loved it, she "started crying like a big dumb baby".

My Favorite Thing Is Monsters has been critically acclaimed. Reviewers for the graphic novel have noted the quality of Ferris's artwork and writing compared to her inexperience in comics publishing. Douglas Wolk of The New York Times said that Ferris has a "portraitist's skill with tiny subtleties of expression and lighting and a New Objectivist's eye for the raw grotesquerie of bodies and their surroundings". The graphic novel has also been received positively by other notable comics artists. Art Spiegelman told The New York Times that Ferris is "one of the most important comics artists of our time" and that she "uses the sketchbook idea as a way to change the grammar and syntax of the comics page". The cover of the novel features praise from Chris Ware and Alison Bechdel.

Paul Tumey of The Comics Journal compared the cross-hatching used to "both vividly delineate detailed forms and evoke a wide palette of emotion" to the work of Robert Crumb and likened the graphic novel to a patchwork quilt he owns, calling it "weird, unique, [and] lovingly crafted from caring and devotion". Oliver Sava of The A.V. Club called it a masterpiece, saying that it stands out against contemporary graphic novels with its "visual splendor, narrative ingenuity, and emotional impact", concluding that "Ferris immediately establishes herself as one of the most exciting, provocative talents in the comics industry". John Powers of NPR said that "for all its stylistic tour-de-forciness, My Favorite Thing Is Monsters is filled with emotion", finding that "every page feels like it's been secreted from the very core of [Ferris's] being".

My Favorite Thing Is Monsters has charted on the Publishers Weekly graphic novel bestseller list. The work garnered three nominations at the 2017 Ignatz Awards—Outstanding Artist, Outstanding Graphic Novel, and Outstanding Story—winning Outstanding Artist and Outstanding Graphic Novel. The novel was nominated for five 2018 Eisner Awards: Best Graphic Album–New, Best Writer/Artist, Best Coloring, Best Lettering, and Best Publication Design. It won Best Graphic Album–New, Best Writer/Artist, and Best Coloring. It was also nominated for a Hugo Award for Best Graphic Story in 2018. The work won a Division Award from the National Cartoonists Society for Graphic Novels. It also won in the category LGBTQ Graphic Novel at the 30th Lambda Literary Awards in 2018. The French edition won the ACBD's Prix de la critique 2019 as well as the Fauve D'Or at the 2019 Angoulême International Comics Festival. The graphic novel has been considered by many critics as one of the best of 2017, including at The New York Times, Publishers Weekly, Comic Book Resources, The A.V. Club, and The Comics Journal. In a tabulation of 136 "Best Comics of 2017" lists, My Favorite Thing Is Monsters received the most mentions.

Ferris's freebie for Free Comic Book Day, Our Favorite Thing Is My Favorite Thing Is Monsters, won the 2020 Eisner Award for "Best Single Issue/One-Shot".
