= Eleanor Spiess-Ferris =

American painter

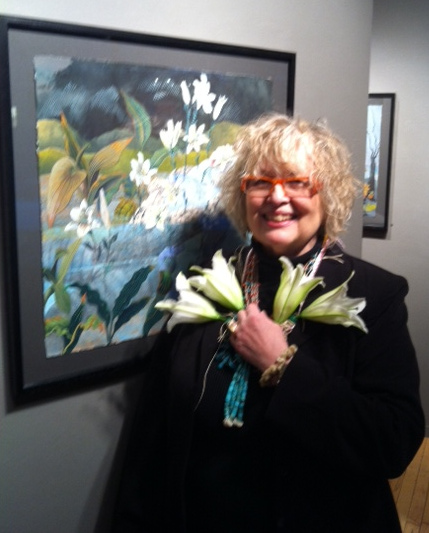
- Spiess-Ferris, 2012
- Born: Eleanor Spiess; July 3, 1941 (age 85); Las Vegas, New Mexico, U.S.
- Education: University of New Mexico (BFA); School of the Art Institute of Chicago (MFA)
- Movement: Symbolist
- Spouse: Mike Ferris (m. 1962; died 2000)
- Children: 2, Michael Ferris and Emil Ferris
- Website: eleanorspiess-ferris.com

Eleanor Spiess-Ferris (born July 3, 1941) is an American symbolist painter cited as a significant surrealist, narrative figurative and feminist artist. Her numerous visual works display powerful influences of the Spanish and Native American cultures of Northern New Mexico, where she grew up. They often reference Penitentes (New Mexico), retablos, Kachinas and Native American fetishes and frequently incorporate themes of feminist spirituality, Indo-European mythology and personal memory.

== Life ==
Spiess-Ferris was born on July 3, 1941, in Las Vegas, New Mexico and raised on a small farm there. Her mother, Harriette, descended from early Spanish settlers in the territory. Her father, Waldo Spiess, was an attorney of German/Irish/Mexican heritage who became Chief Justice of the New Mexico Appellate Court. She earned her BFA at the University of New Mexico and attended the Chicago Art Institute. She married Chicago artist and toy designer Mike Ferris (1938– 2000) in 1962. They had two children, artist Emil Ferris and Michael Ferris Jr., a New York sculptor married to New York artist Rosemarie Fiore. She and her husband lived briefly in Albuquerque and returned to Chicago in the late 1960s.

== Work ==
Spiess-Ferris has created a large body of widely shown works in oil, gouache and Conté crayon over a span of more than four decades, and have included ceramics in her later period. She populates her visual landscapes with human forms – often women, often truncated or morphed – integrated with vividly rendered, precise images of animals, plants and natural phenomena.

Her works evoke and blend mythological, spiritual, psychological, environmental and feminist themes in dreamlike contexts. She draws deeply on her childhood in the high country of northern New Mexico – its landscape and ethnic cultures – where, as youngest of four siblings, she spent much of her playtime alone, exploring her parents’ overgrown apple and plum orchard, observing transformative cycles of life. She plays with the ideas of Symbolist art by morphing figures of women into roots, trees, leaves and birds, yet diverts from them, keeping her figures subconsciously distant, always in the process of formation and evolution.

Her work integrates elements of surrealism, symbolism and expressionism and cites Hieronymus Bosch, Paul Delvaux and James Ensor among disparate artists who have influenced her artistic development. Spiess-Ferris has also produced poetry and short fiction much in the same surrealist-narrative vein as her visual art.

Spiess-Ferris is a Figure Painting and Drawing instructor on the faculty of The Art Center of Evanston Illinois.

== Awards ==
Spiess-Ferris has received numerous major art awards and citations including Artist-in-Residence grants at Anchor Graphics and Paper Press, Chicago, Illinois Arts Council Fellowship Grant and a Vielehr Award from Art Institute of Chicago.

== Major exhibitions ==
- 2014: "Inside the Outside Imagism," Chicago Hyde Park Art Center
- 2013: “Fecundity,” Packer Schopf Gallery
- 2012: “Ophelia’s Gardens” Printworks, Chicago, “Ophelia’s Garden, JRB Gallery, Oklahoma City.
- 2011: “Shallow Waters,” Augustana College, Sioux Falls, South Dakota
- 2010: Elgin Community College, Safety-Kleen Gallery One, Elgin, Illinois - Sketches, Orchards & Dark Ponds – Catalog – essay by Ed Krantz. “Paintings of a Suffering Planet” – Western Illinois University, Macomb, Ill.
- 2009: “Sorrows of Swans” – Printworks Gallery, Chicago, Illinois, Gouache on Paper. “Sorrows of Swans” – Chicago Cultural Center, Mich. Ave. Gallery, Chicago, Oils on Linen, “Sorrows of Swans. Elmhurst College, Elmhurst, Illinois, Sorrows of Swans – Catalog - essay by James Yood
- 2006: “Water and Other Wise” – Packer Gallery, Chicago, Illinois. “The Magpie Chronicles” – Robert T. Wright community Gallery of Art, College of Lake County, Grayslake, Illinois The Magpie Chronicles – Catalog – essay by Garrett Holg
- 2002: “Regeneration” – Zaks Gallery, Chicago, Illinois
- 1999: “New Works” – Zaks Gallery, Chicago, Illinois
- 1996: “The Goddess Series” – Shircliff Gallery of Art, Vincennes University, Vincennes, Indiana
- 1994: “Works on Paper” – Zaks Gallery, Chicago, Illinois
- 1992: “The Goddess Series” – Kalamazoo Institute of Arts, Kalamazoo, Michigan, “Eleanor Spiess-Ferris: An Artist’s Journey” - University of Wisconsin at Green Bay, Green Bay, Wisconsin. “Eleanor Spiess-Ferris: An Artist’s Journey” – Charles Wustum Museum – Racine, Wisconsin . "Eleanor Spiess-Ferris: an Artist’s Journey" – Catalog – essay by Estella Lauter
- 1990: “New Works” – Zaks Gallery, Chicago, Illinois
- 1989: Kansas City Artists Coalition, Kansas City, Missouri. University of Wisconsin at La Crosse, La Crosse, Wisconsin
- 1987: “Beamish Mummery” – Chicago Cultural center, Chicago, Ill
- 1984: “New Works, Eleanor Spiess-Ferris” – van Stratten Gallery, Chicago, Illinois
