= The Jurassic League =

Limited comic book series by Daniel Warren Johnson and Juan Gedeon

- Cover of The Jurassic League #1 (May 2022). Art by Daniel Warren Johnson.

Publication information
- Publisher: DC Comics
- Schedule: Monthly
- Format: Limited series
- Genre: Prehistoric; Superhero
- Publication date: May – October 2022
- No. of issues: 6
- Main character: Jurassic League

Creative team
- Written by: Daniel Warren Johnson; Juan Gedeon
- Artist(s): Juan Gedeon; Rafael Garres; Jon Mikel

The Jurassic League, often simply referred to as Jurassic League, is an American comic book published by DC Comics. The six-issue limited series, co-written by Daniel Warren Johnson and Juan Gedeon and illustrated by Gedeon, began publication on May 10, 2022.

An animated film based on the comic is in development at DC Studios.

== Premise ==
The Jurassic League presents a prehistoric version of Earth from an alternate reality where the heroes and villains of DC are anthropomorphic dinosaurs.

== Production ==
=== Development ===
According to Daniel Warren Johnson and Juan Gedeon, the authors of The Jurassic League, the series' unusual concept came from their shared interest in classic franchises starring dinosaurs and anthropomorphic creatures, with Johnson commenting: "I dig the Justice League, but I dig them more as dinosaurs. It's been an absolute pleasure to join Juan Gedeon in creating a new world for DC, complete with dinos, cavemen, and extinction level events". DC Senior Editor Katie Kubert said she was thrilled when Johnson and Gedeon came to her with the idea for the comic book, as Kubert, in her own words, "knew we had something truly special".

=== Design ===
Regarding the redesign of DC characters from humanoid beings to dinosaurs, Gedeon explained: "I wanted each dino to be recognized immediately as the hero they represent. So I tried to pick a dino that captured the essence of their human counterpart to use as base". For example, he and Johnson decided to turn Wonder Woman into a Triceratops, as they considered it to have an "athletic" physique that would fit with Wonder Woman's; in Superman's case, they chose a Brachiosaurus, as it was a herbivore that seemed harmless, but solid and strong at the same time, akin to the hero's image; and for Batman, the duo intended to change him into a "carnivorous dino", and Allosaurus felt right as it had horns that resembled Batman's cowl ears. Another reason for this choice is that using a bigger dinosaur, like Tyrannosaurus, would make Batman look too powerful, a notion that Johnson and Gedeon opposed themselves, with both taking into account the fact that Batman has no super powers.

=== Influences ===
As inspiration for The Jurassic League, Johnson and Gedeon cited several points of influence for the creation of the series, such as Age of Reptiles, Primal, Primal Rage, Street Sharks, Teenage Mutant Ninja Turtles, and James Groman's horror-inspired sculptures. The version of the Joker seen in The Jurassic League, who is a Dilophosaurus in this continuity, was modeled after the portrayal of Heath Ledger in the 2008 film The Dark Knight and the character Vertigo from Primal Rage, with Johnson and Gedeon wanting this particular iteration of the Joker to be "crazy, sneaky, colorful, unpredictable, dangerous and cool, but kinda disgusting to some degree".

== Publication ==
The Jurassic League was co-written by Daniel Warren Johnson and Juan Gedeon, the latter of whom also handled the interior artwork for the comic book, while the former designed the front covers for all its six issues. The limited series was officially announced by DC Comics on February 3, 2022. The six issues of The Jurassic League are released by DC at monthly intervals, with the first being published on May 10, 2022.

The Jurassic League appear in Batman: The Brave and the Bold issue #14, released on June 25, 2024, written by Mark Russell and with Jon Mikel handling the artwork.

=== Issues ===
Issue	Publication date	Ref.
#1	May 10, 2022	
#2	June 14, 2022	
#3	July 19, 2022	
#4	August 10, 2022	
#5	September 13, 2022	
#6	October 11, 2022	

== Reception ==
Following the announcement of The Jurassic League, the series was met with a highly positive response from the general public, who expressed their approval and enthusiasm for the comic book on social media in general.

== In other media ==
An animated film based on The Jurassic League was revealed to be in development at DC Studios and Warner Bros. Animation in February 2024, with James Gunn and Peter Safran producing and Brian Lynch writing the script.

== See also ==
- Dinosaurs for Hire, a comic book series with a similar premise.
