= Daniel Warren Johnson =

Comic book artist and writer

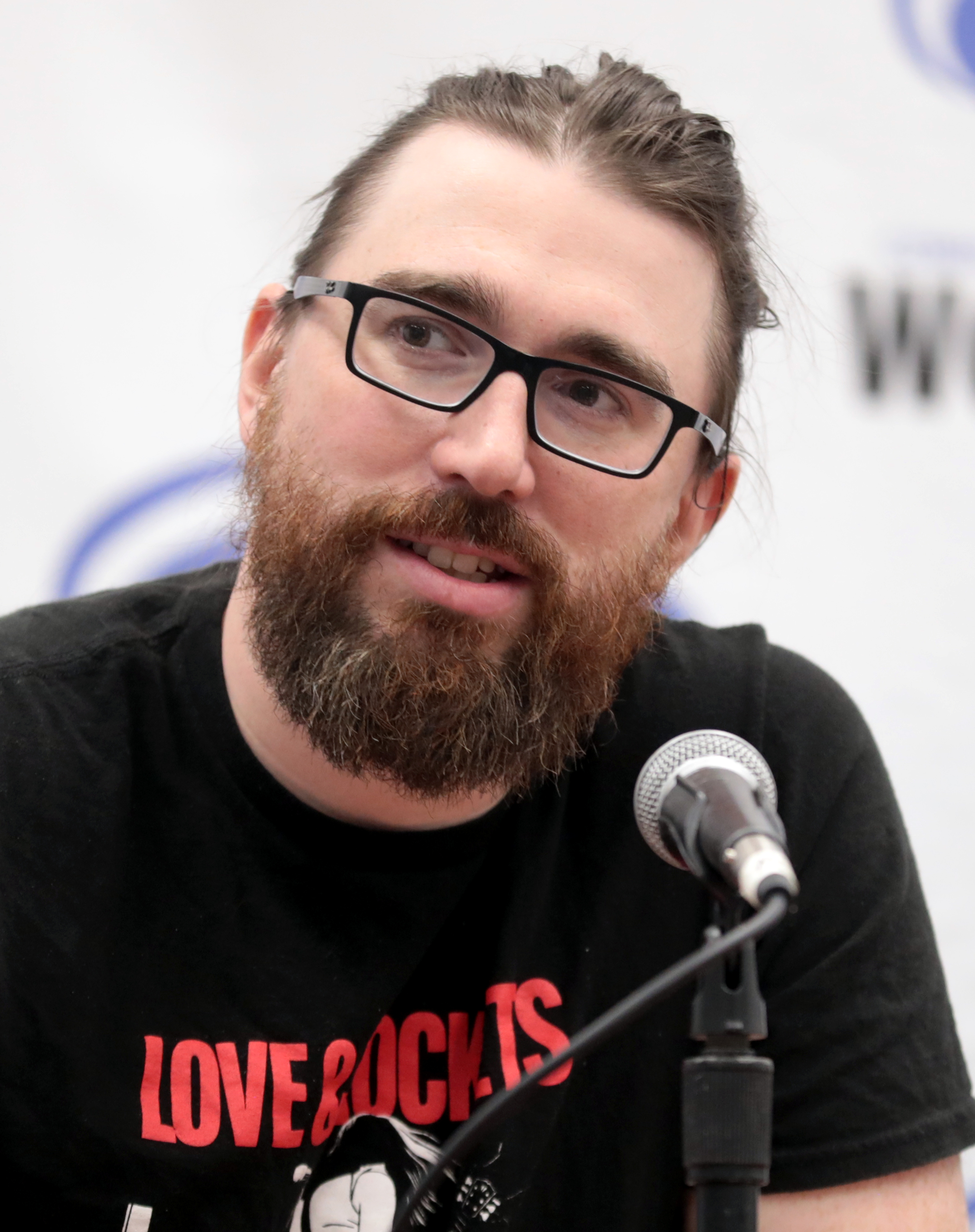
- Johnson at the 2023 WonderCon
- Born: March 1987 (age 39) Massachusetts, U.S.
- Areas: Writer, Artist
- Awards: ComicBook.com Golden Issues Award for Best Artist (2021); Eisner Award for Best Limited Series (2022); Eisner Award for Best Publication for Teens (2023); Eisner Award for Best Continuing Series (2024); Eisner Award for Best Writer/Artist (2024)

Daniel Warren Johnson (born March 1987) is an American comic book artist and writer based in Chicago. He has worked on comics with Image, Marvel, and DC. He also collaborated with colorist Mike Spicer beginning with Extremity. The duo also worked together on the Wonder Woman: Dead Earth and Beta Ray Bill: Argent Star mini-series. He followed that with a solo project, Do A Powerbomb in 2022. His works have been published in five languages.

He received the ComicBook.com Golden Issues Award for Best Artist in 2021. He was selected for his ability to illustrate fights and his empathy. He was nominated for IGN's Best Comic Book Artist of 2020 award for his powerful fight scenes in Wonder Woman: Dead Earth. He was subsequently been noticed for his work in Do a Powerbomb. In 2022, he was nominated for Best Limited Series by the Eisner Awards. In 2023, he won Best Publication for Teens for the series. In 2024, his work on Transformers earned two more Eisner Awards for Best Continuing Series and Best Writer/Artist.

== Early life ==
Originally from Massachusetts, Johnson has stated that his introduction to comic books was Bill Watterson's Calvin and Hobbes. He has explained that he had a sheltered childhood, and wasn't allowed to read certain comics or watch certain cartoons as a child. Reading these stories inspired Johnson to start drawing. Johnson was homeschooled beginning in third grade and continuing until twelfth. He was tutored by a woman named Rosetta at a local art center, who he credits as being influential for his career. Johnson went to college in Chicago to get a degree in teaching, before changing paths and getting a job as a patient transporter at a hospital. At his job at the hospital, Johnson would occasionally draw portraits of patients. After returning to teaching, Johnson's wife Rachel encouraged him to pursue a career in art.

== Career ==
Daniel Warren Johnson gained popularity through his first major web-comic Space Mullet that began in 2012 and ran until 2017. In 2014 Johnson collaborated with Donny Cates on the Dark Horse Comics published The Ghost Fleet. Continuing his partnership with Dark Horse Space Mullet was printed and published in a trade paperback from the publisher in 2016. In 2015 Johnson pitched his creator-owned series Extremity for Image Comics and Skybound Entertainment, and the series began coming out in 2017. his work for which was nominated for an Eisner Award for best limited series. Extremity also marks the beginning of the collaboration between Johnson and colorist Mike Spicer. Johnson has stated that Extremity was a series that he wanted to feel like he was taking seriously, unlike Space Mullet before it. Johnson has discussed that he met with some Hollywood studio executives to discuss making Extremity into a movie, but these discussions went nowhere due to the high budget an adaptation would require.

Following the completion of Extremity, Johnson moved to his next creator-owned project, Murder Falcon. In the collected edition, Johnson shares a personal story at the start describing the comic's encapsulation of all the things that Johnson appreciates and holds dear, while also telling a story about being brave during the hardest times in life. The pair then went to DC Comics to work on their DC Black Label mini-series Wonder Woman: Dead Earth published from December 2019 to August 2020. The story is an alternate universe tale starring Wonder Woman in a post-apocalyptic world where nightmarish monsters roam the Earth. After the completion of Dead Earth, Spicer and Johnson went to Marvel Comics to collaborate of the mini-series Beta Ray Bill: Argent Star which ran from March to July in 2021.

The duo then returned to creator-owned work at Image Comics with Do a Powerbomb beginning in June 2022 and finishing in December of the same year. In June 2023, it was announced that Johnson and Spicer would be working on the Transformers ongoing series being developed at Skybound Entertainment. Johnson served as writer on the first 24 issues of the series, as well as being the principal artist on the first 6 issues. In June 2024, it was announced that Johnson would be writing a new series for Image, The Moon Is Following Us, with Johnson and Riley Rossmo sharing art duties and Mike Spicer coloring. The first issue was released September 2024. As of October 2023, Johnson was also working on another indie project, one that he will write and draw and is described as "an epic sci-fi fantasy that is a love letter to his wife and daughter". In July 2026 that project was revealed as Chainkata. The series, which Johnson has been working on since 2017, follow Luma, chainsaw-wielding warrior queen, seeking out an unknown power in the vastness of space. The first issue will debut in November 2026.

Comic	Publisher	Issues	Year
Space Mullet	Self-published (later by Dark Horse and Image)	8	2012–2017
The Ghost Fleet	Dark Horse Comics (written by Donny Cates)	8	2014
Alabaster: The Good, the Bad, and the Bird	Dark Horse Comics (written by Caitlin R. Kiernan)	5	2015–2016
Extremity	Image Comics	12	2017–2018
Murder Falcon	Image Comics	8	2018–2019
Wonder Woman: Dead Earth	DC Comics	4	2019–2020
Beta Ray Bill: Argent Star	Marvel Comics	5	2021
Do A Powerbomb	Image Comics	7	2022
The Jurassic League	DC Comics (art by Juan Gedeon)	6	2022
Transformers	Image Comics (art by Jorge Corona and Jason Howard) (Skybound Imprint)	24	2023–2025
The Moon is Following Us	Image Comics (art by Riley Rossmo)	10	2024–2025

In addition to receiving the Comic book.com Golden Issues Award for Best Artist in 2021, he has also received an award from the Ohio Digital Library. In 2022, he received a nomination for Best Limited Series by the Eisner Awards. He went on to win three Eisner Awards: Best Publication for Teens in 2023 for Do a Powerbomb, as well as Best Writer/Artist and Best Continuing Series for Transformers. His works have been published in six languages.

== Bibliography ==
=== As writer ===
==== DC Comics ====
- DC's Zatannic Panic! #1

==== Marvel Comics ====
- Fantastic Four Fanfare #4
- Hulk #8

=== As artist ===
- Sinestro Annual #1

=== As writer and artist ===
- Absolute Batman Annual #1
- Batman: Black and White #4
- Dark Nights: Death Metal – Legends of the Dark Knights #1
- Deadpool: Black, White & Blood #2
- Star Wars: Darth Vader – Black, White & Red #3
- Superman: Red and Blue #5
- Wolverine (Vol. 8) #8
- Wonder Woman : Dead Earth
- Murder Falcons
- Beta Ray Bill

=== Cover work ===
- 2020 iWolverine #2 (Variant Cover)
- Absolute Batman #2 (Cover B)
- Alien Annual #1 (Variant Cover)
- Batman & The Joker: The Deadly Duo #5 (Cover F)
- Batman '89: Echoes #2 (Cover B)
- Batman: One Bad Day – Bane #1 (Cover D)
- Cable #155-159
- Daredevil: Cold Day in Hell #3 (Variant Cover)
- DC K.O. #1-3 (Variant Covers)
- Demon Wars: Down in Flames #1 (Variant Cover)
- The Despicable Deadpool #294 (Variant Cover)
- Doctor Strange: Fall Sunrise #1 (Variant Cover)
- The Flash #756 (Variant Cover)
- Future State: Robin Eternal #1-2 (Variant Covers)
- G.I. Joe #6 (Cover F)
- The Immortal She-Hulk #1 (Variant Cover)
- Justice League: Endless Winter #1-2 (Cover B)
- Legends of the Dark Knight #7 (Cover C)
- Peacemaker Tries Hard! #5 (Cover B)
- Star Trek: Day of Blood #1 (Cover G and H)
- Star Trek: Waypoint #3
- Star Wars: DJ – Most Wanted #1 (Variant Cover)
- Wesley Dodds: The Sandman #2 (Cover B)
