= Musée =

2023 comic book by Christophe Chabouté

- Page count: 192 pages
- Publisher: Vents d'Ouest

Creative team
- Creator: Christophe Chabouté

Original publication
- Date of publication: 19 April 2023
- Language: French
- ISBN: 9782749309774

Musée (lit. 'Museum') is a 2023 French comic book by Christophe Chabouté. It is set at the Musée d'Orsay in Paris and portrays how different people view the collection during the day, and how the paintings and sculptures come to life at night and discuss the museum visitors they have seen. Vents d'Ouest published the book on 19 April 2023.

Léa Compère of Planète BD called the book "superbly illustrated" and praised how it uses subtlety and humour to raise questions about people's relationship to artworks. It was awarded RTL's Grand prix RTL de la bande dessinée.
