= Jar of Fools =

American comic strip by Jason Lutes

- Cover art for the 2003 Drawn & Quarterly edition of Jar of Fools.

Publication information
- Publisher: Drawn & Quarterly
- Schedule: Weekly
- Format: Comic strip, then collected graphic novel
- Main character(s): Erich Weiss; Esther O'Dea; Al "The Great" Flosso

Creative team
- Written by: Jason Lutes

Jar of Fools is a once-weekly comic strip by Jason Lutes that was compiled, first into a two-part anthology, and then a graphic novel. The work has received praise from The New York Times Book Review, Spin, Wired, and acclaimed comics creator Chris Ware.

Jar of Fools is the story of a tormented magician named Ernie Weiss (likely based on Harry Houdini, whose name was originally Ehrich Weiss). His brother, Howard, has died and he has become estranged from his girlfriend, Esther O'Dea. The story of the comic retells Ernie's struggles to get himself back on track and find himself, in part through the guidance of Al Flosso (likely also based on a real magician of the same name).

The strip first ran weekly in The Stranger, a weekly Seattle alternative newspaper. Lutes self-published a collection of strips at first (as Penny Dreadful Press in 1994), then in 1996 Black Eye Productions released the series in a two-part collected graphic novel. The book was later published by Drawn & Quarterly in 2003, where Lutes also released his Berlin series.

Jar of Fools was one of Lutes's first mainstream successes, earning him praise from many publications. Chris Ware, one of the most popular alternative comics writers, said of Jar of Fools: "Reading Jar of Fools is like getting a slow motion punch in the face. There's plenty of time to get out of the way, but something compels you to wait and find out if it's actually going to hurt as much when it hits. And, of course, it does". Will Shetterly and Emma Bull picked Jar as one of the two best graphic novels of 1994, describing it as "an astonishingly mature work".

The success of Jar of Fools came as something of a surprise to Lutes. On that subject he says: "I think it was well-received partly because I set out specifically to tell a story that could be picked up and read by people who did not usually read comics, and partly because the reader could in some way participate in the same process of discovery I went through in its creation".
