= Mira Jacob =

American writer

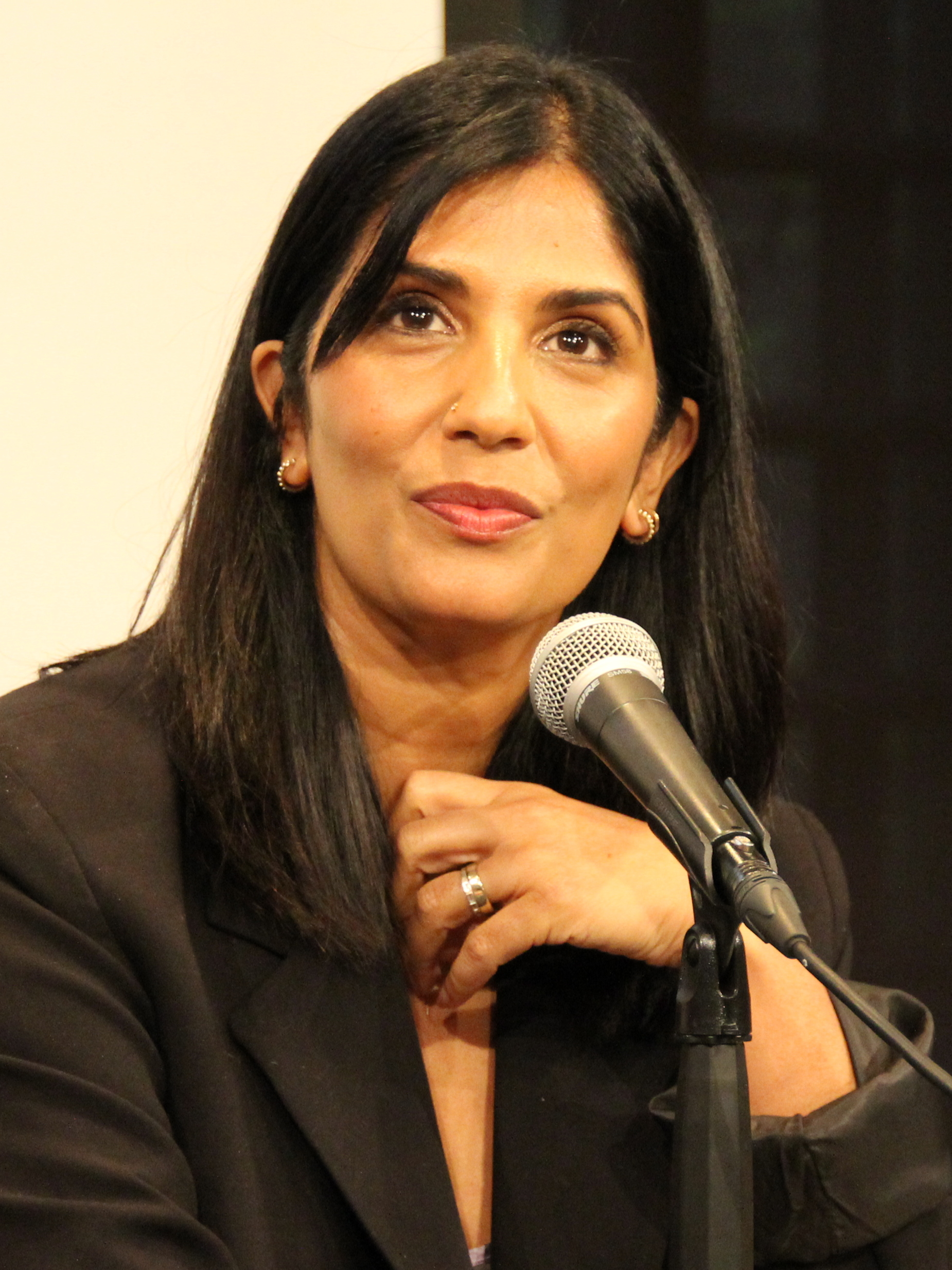
- Jacob in 2024
- Born: January 5, 1973 (age 53); Albuquerque, New Mexico, U.S.
- Education: Oberlin College (BA); The New School for Social Research (MFA)
- Occupation: Writer
- Spouse: Jed Rothstein
- Children: 1
- Writing career
- Notable works: The Sleepwalker's Guide to Dancing; Good Talk: A Memoir in Conversations ' ' The Ultrasound' '
- Website: mirajacob.com

Mira Jacob (born January 5, 1973, in Albuquerque, New Mexico) is an American writer. She is the author of The Sleepwalker's Guide to Dancing (2014), a novel about a patriarch who starts talking to ghosts, and Good Talk (2019), a graphic memoir.

== Early and personal life ==
Jacob was born and raised in New Mexico to Indian Malayali parents who immigrated from Kerala, India in 1968, the same year they were wed in an arranged marriage. Because there were so few Indian Americans in New Mexico, people often assumed she was Native American, she told Kirkus: "They all thought we were Hopi or Apache or Mexican." When Jacob was 20, her parents fell in love, she wrote in an essay for Vogue. Jacob wrote that their renewed relationship allowed her to form her own romantic relationship with filmmaker Jed Rothstein, whom she later married.

She now lives in Brooklyn with Rothstein and their son.

== Education and career ==
Jacob earned her BA from Oberlin College in 1996. She earned her MFA from the New School for Social Research.

Jacob is the founder of Pete's Reading Series, a reading series in Brooklyn. She is the author of The Sleepwalker's Guide to Dancing, a novel about a patriarch who starts talking to ghosts, and how his seeing spirits affects his family. The Sleepwalker's Guide to Dancing took Jacob 10 years to complete, during which time her father became sick and died. After his death, Jacob rewrote much of the book with the father character as her own father.

Jacob's second book, Good Talk, is a graphic memoir published in 2019. Good Talk was shortlisted for the National Book Critics Circle Award, long-listed for the PEN Open Book Award, and named a New York Times Notable Book. It was selected as a best book of the year by Time, Esquire, Publishers Weekly, and Library Journal. The memoir is currently in development as a television series with Film 44.

== Works ==
- The Sleepwalker's Guide to Dancing. A&C Black. 3 July 2014. ISBN 978-1-4088-4116-7.
  - Die Aufforderung des Schlafwandlers zum Tanz. Bastei Entertainment. 12 March 2015. ISBN 978-3-7325-0591-3.
- Good Talk: A Memoir in Conversations. Bloomsbury Publishing. 2019. ISBN 9781408880173.
