= The Park Bench (comic book) =

2012 comic book by Christophe Chabouté

The Park Bench (Un peu de bois et d'acier)
- Page count: 336 pages
- Publisher: Vents d'Ouest

Creative team
- Writer: Christophe Chabouté
- Artist: Christophe Chabouté

Original publication
- Date of publication: 12 September 2012
- Language: French
- ISBN: 9782749306551

Translation
- Publisher: Faber & Faber
- Date: 6 July 2017
- ISBN: 9780571332304

The Park Bench (French: Un peu de bois et d'acier, lit. 'A Little Bit of Wood and Steel') is a 2012 French comic book by Christophe Chabouté. It centres on a park bench and shows fragments of the lives of the people who pass by it. It is in black-and-white and almost entirely without text.

ActuaBD called it "a true tale of the ordinary" where "Chabouté infuses these banal or extravagant encounters with a touch of magic".

It was the basis for the French 45-minute film A Little Bit of Wood and Steel directed by Antoine Laurens, which was released in 2014.
