= Alone (comic book) =

2008 comic book by Christophe Chabouté

Alone (Tout seul)
- Page count: 376 pages
- Publisher: Vents d'Ouest

Creative team
- Writer: Christophe Chabouté
- Artist: Christophe Chabouté

Original publication
- Date of publication: 17 September 2008
- Language: French
- ISBN: 9782749304298

Translation
- Publisher: Faber & Faber
- Date: 3 May 2018
- ISBN: 9780571332441
- Translator: Ivanka Hahnenberger

Alone (French: Tout seul) is a 2008 French comic book by Christophe Chabouté. It is set at an isolated lighthouse, occupied by a deformed man who never has left the tiny, rocky island it is situated on, when a new deckhand for the fisherman who provides food to the lighthouse begins to interact with its inhabitant.

It was the basis for the 15-minute short film Alone directed by Antoine Laurens, released in 2018.
