= Jason Lutes =

American comics creator (born 1967)

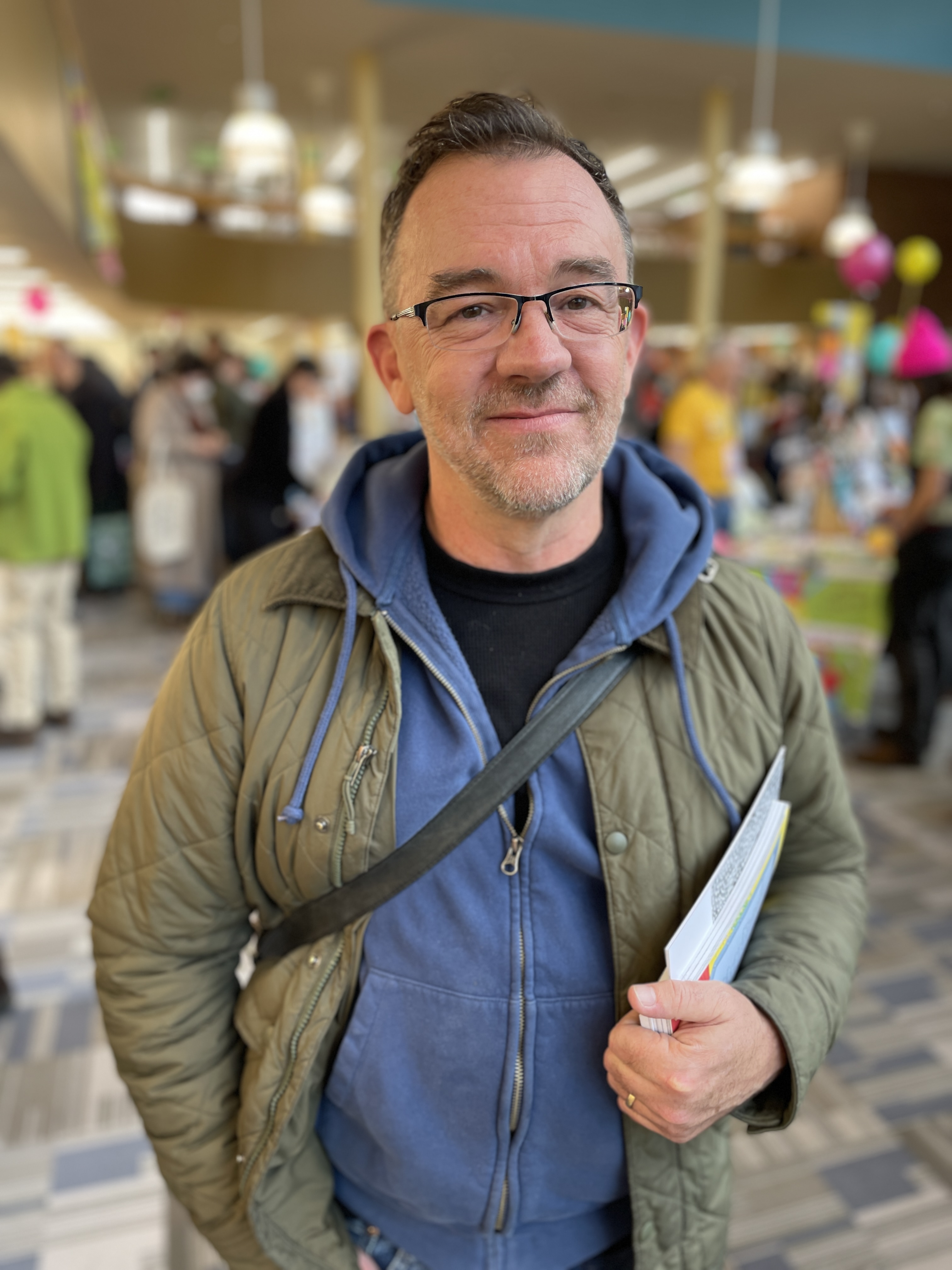
- Jason Lutes
- Born: December 7, 1967 (age 58) New Jersey, US
- Areas: Cartoonist, Writer
- Notable works: Jar of Fools; Berlin
- Awards: Xeric Award, 1993; Inkpot Award, 2018; Vermont Book Award, 2019

Jason Lutes (born December 7, 1967) is an American comics creator. His work is mainly historical fiction, but he also works in traditional fiction. He is best-known for his Berlin series, which he wrote and drew over 22 years. He has also written a handful of other graphic novels, as well as many short pieces for anthologies and compilations. He now teaches comics at the Center for Cartoon Studies.

== Biography ==
Lutes was born in New Jersey, but his family soon relocated to Missoula, Montana. In his early years, Lutes liked superhero comics, but a trip to France exposed him to European comics like The Adventures of Tintin and Asterix, which he says greatly affected his style of drawing.

Lutes went to college at the Rhode Island School of Design, graduating with a Bachelor of Fine Arts in 1991. He moved to Seattle after graduation, where he found work for the alternative comics publisher Fantagraphics, and eventually became art director of the alternative weekly The Stranger.

During this period, Lutes began writing and self-publishing his own comic work with Penny Dreadful Press. In 1993 Lutes began serializing a strip for The Stranger, which was collected in 1996 in the critically acclaimed graphic novel Jar of Fools. After two years of research, in 1996 Lutes embarked on the ambitious comic book series Berlin, an ongoing 22-chapter story set in the twilight years of Germany's Weimar Republic. When Berlin's original publisher Black Eye Productions closed in 1998, Drawn & Quarterly took over the series.

Lutes subsequently moved to Asheville, North Carolina, in October 2002; this move forms the subject of his autobiographical Rules to Live By, collected in AutobioGraphix by Dark Horse Comics.

In 2007, Hyperion published the graphic novel Houdini: The Handcuff King, written by Lutes and illustrated by Nick Bertozzi.

Starting in the spring of 2008, he became part of the faculty of the Center for Cartoon Studies; he is now an adjunct professor there.

=== Personal life ===
Lutes has two sons, Clem (born 2006) and Max, with his partner Becka Warren.

== Bibliography ==
Lutes has published work in a variety of forms.

=== Series ===
- Jar of Fools (1994)
- Berlin (1996–2018, ISBN 978-1770463264)
  - Berlin Book One: City of Stones (2000, ISBN 1-896597-29-7)
  - Berlin Book Two: City of Smoke (2008, ISBN 978-1-897299-53-1)
  - Berlin Book Three: City of Light (2018, ISBN 978-1-896597-29-4)

=== Children's series ===
- “The Secret Three” (with Jake Austen, in Nickelodeon Magazine, 1997–1999)
- “Sam Shade” (with Paul Karasik, in Nickelodeon Magazine, 2002–2005)

=== Graphic novels ===
- The Fall (with Ed Brubaker) (2001)
- Houdini: The Handcuff King (words; pictures by Nick Bertozzi, 2007) ISBN 978-0-78683902-5 (2007, Hyperion), ISBN 978-0-78683903-2 (2008, Disney–Hyperion)

=== Short work ===
- (inks) Rock & Roll High School #1–2 (with Bob Fingerman and Shane Oakley) (Roger Corman's Cosmic Comics, 1995)
- “Side Trip” (in Dark Horse Presents #125, pp. 23–28, 1997)
- “Late Summer Sun” (in Drawn & Quarterly: A Picture Story Book (Volume 2, number 6), pp. 31–38, 1997 June, ISBN 1-896597-09-2)
- “We Three Things” (pictures only, script by Peter Gross; in Vertigo, The Books of Magic, Winter's Edge #2, pp. 35–42, 1998)
- “Rules to Live By” (in AutobioGraphix, by Dark Horse Comics, 2003).
- “Small Explosions” (in Rosetta #2, 2004)

=== Illustrations ===
Troubled by the Fire, by Laura Veirs

Occasional illustrations:

- Album cover for Troubled by the Fire (2003), Laura Veirs
- Illustrations for "How Did Economists Get It So Wrong?", Paul Krugman, The New York Times.

=== Unpublished work ===
Unpublished work includes:

- 1-page biography of J. R. R. Tolkien for The Stranger (1997)
- "Which Witch is Witch?", 3-page story for "Sam Shade" in Nickelodeon Magazine, written by Paul Karasik (2003)
- short Charles Atlas parody for The Stranger (2004)

=== Other work ===
Lutes has done some game work, such as unit portraits for the open-source video game Battle for Wesnoth (2006), a map for Dominions 3: The Awakening (2006), and website illustration for City of Heroes (2005).
