= Black Eye Productions =

Defunct Canadian comic book publisher

Black Eye Books
- Industry: Comics
- Predecessor: Black Eye Productions
- Founded: 1992
- Founder: Michel Vrana
- Headquarters: Toronto, Ontario, Canada
- Website: www.blackeye.ca

Black Eye Books (formerly called Black Eye Productions) is a small but influential Canadian comic book publishing company founded by Michel Vrana. Under the auspices of Vrana, Black Eye was known as a publisher of artfully designed alternative comics and graphic novels, most of whose cartoonists have gone on to successful careers with fellow Canadian publisher Drawn & Quarterly. For several years, Vrana acted as Drawn & Quarterly's exclusive outside design consultant. In 2019 the company was relaunched as a micro-press with a focus on using crowdfunding to bring projects to fruition.

== History ==
Vrana's first worked with publisher Tragedy Strikes Press, which operated out of Guelph, Ontario, from 1991–1993. Comics published by Tragedy Strikes Press included Nick Craine's The Cheeseheads, the anthology series Reactor Girl, Jay Stephens' Sin, Carol Swain's Way Out Strips, and the first issue of Dylan Horrocks' Pickle. Sin and Pickle were picked up by Black Eye Books; Way Out Strips was picked up by Fantagraphics.

Black Eye acted as a comic book publisher from 1992 to 1998, when Vrana transitioned the business to graphic design studio. In 2019, Vrana relaunched Black Eye Books to publish the previously cancelled 11th issue of Pickle, by Dylan Horrocks. This was followed by the publication of Dejects, by Jay Stephens, the first full-colour publication from Black Eye. From 2010-2024, Black Eye Books published Jay Stephens’ horror series Dwellings. Other publications since 2019 include the collected Dishman by John MacLeod, That Distant Fire by JR Hughto and Curt Merlo, Assorted Baggage by Matthew Daley, and a box set of James Kochalka books: Elf Cat is Famous, Moon Book Prototype, and Duck Fighter.

== Publications ==
=== Ongoing titles and limited series ===
- Atomic City Tales vol. 1 (Jay Stephens, 1994–1995)
- Berlin (Jason Lutes, 1996–1998)
- Dear Julia (Brian Biggs, 4 issues, 1996-1997)
- The Land of Nod vol. 1 (Jay Stephens, 1996–1997)
- Pickle (Dylan Horrocks, 1992-1997, 2019)
- The Sands (Tom Hart, 1996–1997)
- Sin Comics (Jay Stephens, 1993–1994)
- Sputnik (anthology, 1993–1994)
- Dwellings (Jay Stephens, 2010–2024)

=== Graphic novels and trade paperbacks ===
- Atomic City Tales (Jay Stephens, 1994)
- Black Candy (Matt Madden, 1998) ISBN 978-0-9698874-6-1
- A Complete Lowlife (Ed Brubaker, 1997)
- Dance Me Outside: The Illustrated Screenplay (Nick Craine, 1994) ISBN 978-0-9698874-0-9
- Dejects (Jay Stephens, 2019) ISBN 978-1-9991635-0-1
- Hicksville (Dylan Horrocks, 1998)
- Human Remains (Darren Raye & Sean Scoffield, 1994)
- Jar of Fools (Jason Lutes, 1995)
- The Land of Nod Treasury (Jay Stephens, 1994)
- The Sands: a Picture Story (Tom Hart, 1998) ISBN 978-0-9698874-8-5

== Cartoonists associated with Black Eye ==
- Brian Biggs
- Ed Brubaker
- Nick Craine
- Tom Hart
- Dylan Horrocks
- Jason Lutes
- Matt Madden
- Darren Raye
- Sean Scoffield
- Jay Stephens
- James Kochalka
