= Berlin (comics) =

Comic book series created by Jason Lutes

Berlin: City of Stones
- Cover of Berlin: City of Stones (Book One)

Publication information
- Publisher: Black Eye Productions, Drawn & Quarterly
- Schedule: Irregular
- Format: Limited series
- Genre: Historical
- Publication date: April 1996 – March 2018
- No. of issues: 22

Creative team
- Written by: Jason Lutes
- Artist: Jason Lutes

Collected editions
- Book One: City of Stones: ISBN 1-896597-29-7
- Book Two: City of Smoke: ISBN 978-1-897299-53-1
- Book Three: City of Light: ISBN 978-1-896597-29-4

Berlin is a comic book series by Jason Lutes, published by Black Eye Productions and then Drawn & Quarterly. Planned as a series of 24 magazines, since reduced to 22, then re-released in book form, it describes life in Berlin from 1928 to 1933, during the decline of the Weimar Republic.

Taking 22 years to complete, it has been described as Lutes's magnum opus. Lutes was awarded the Inkpot Award in 2018, coinciding with the completion of the work, and Berlin itself was awarded the Vermont Book Award in 2019.

== Plot ==
=== Book One ===
The first eight issues were compiled into a book titled Berlin: City of Stones, published in 2000. It starts with Marthe Müller, an art student, arriving in Berlin. One story arc details the start of her life in Berlin, focusing on her relationship to journalist Kurt Severing. A second storyline describes a working-class family which breaks up due to differing political views, the mother, Gudrun, eventually joining the communists with her daughters Elga and Silvia, while the father takes his son Heinz to the Nazis. The book ends with the massacre of 1 May 1929, the International Workers' Day (known in German as Blutmai).

=== Book Two ===
Issues 9–16 have been compiled into Berlin Book Two: City of Smoke, published in 2008. In this second volume, the relationship between Marthe and Kurt disintegrates, partly due to the influence of Kurt's former lover, the socialite Margarethe. Marthe develops a lesbian relationship with her fellow art student Anna. Gudrun's daughter Silvia struggles to survive in the streets of Berlin, partly with the help of a Jewish junk collector. Another major subplot involves a group of African-American jazz musicians who perform at a Berlin nightclub, but slowly begin to believe they are being ripped-off by their local manager. The volume concludes with the electoral victory of the Nazi Party in September 1930.

=== Book Three ===
The final volume was published by Drawn and Quarterly in 2018, and comprises issues 17–22. The title of this final part is Berlin: City of Light.

With the Nazi party now in power, the tensions between the factions erupt all over the country. The Communists prepare themselves for being attacked by the police and the followers of Hitler. Marthe and Anne are now living together, while Severing plunges into depression after his editor is arrested by the government. As the situation around them becomes increasingly violent, the characters slowly give up trying to change their own destiny and start planning for the future.

== Collected editions ==
The series has been collected into trade paperback:

- Berlin: City of Stones (collects Berlin #1–8, Drawn & Quarterly, 1 June 2000, ISBN 1-896597-29-7)
- Berlin: City of Smoke (collects Berlin #9–16, Drawn & Quarterly, 19 August 2008, ISBN 978-1-897299-53-1)
- Berlin Book Three: City of Light (collects Berlin #17-22, Drawn & Quarterly, 4 September 2018, ISBN 978-1770463271)

...and into a single hardcover, ISBN 978-1770463264

The first two collected volumes had more than 100,000 copies printed, while the hardcover edition had a first run of 20,000 copies.

== Reviews ==
- Rolling Stone listed the series at #48 in their list of "50 Best Non-Superhero Graphic Novels".
- Boxer, Sarah (March 7–20, 2019). "Berlin before the storm". The New York Review of Books. 66 (4): 31–32.

== Tributes ==
In homage to Lutes's work, 157 cartoonists (primarily past and present students at the Center for Cartoon Studies) organized a "Secret Berlin Project": they recreated the first six chapters of Berlin, each drawing a page in their own style, and presented it to Lutes at an event at CCS in May 2018.

== Historical references ==
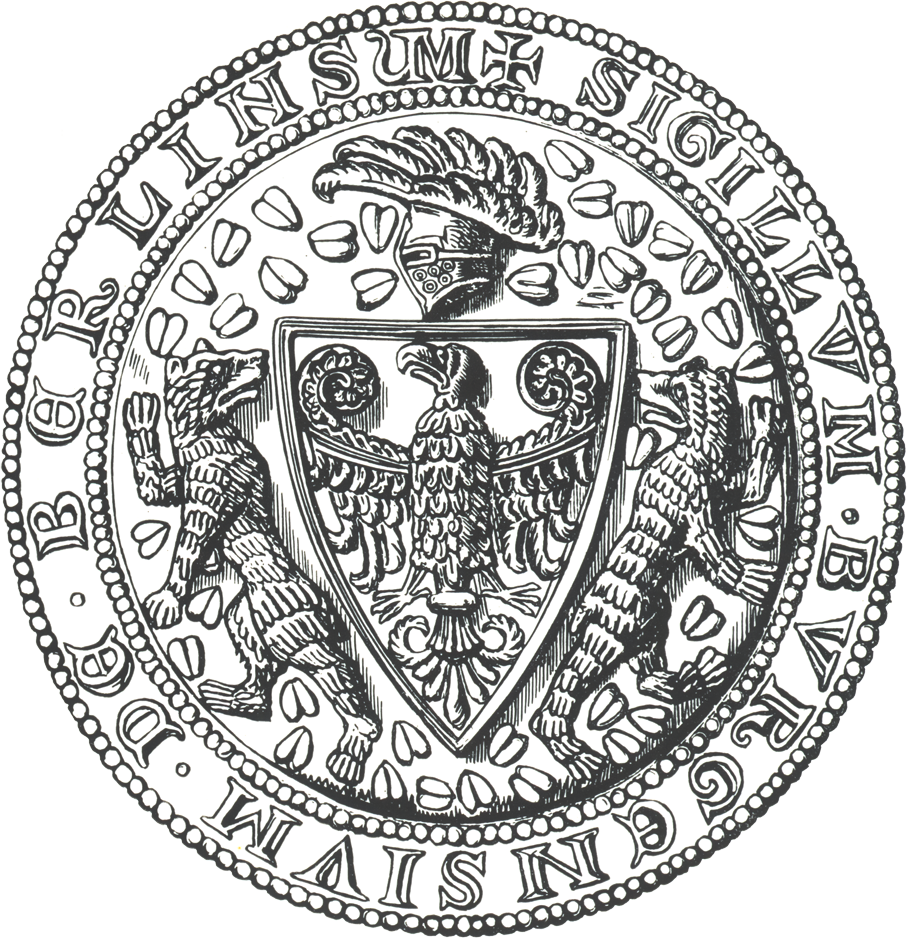
Guild Seal of Berlin, 1280, which closes the book.

Berlin features a number of historical events, organizations, and figures, listed in end materials.

The book ends with a contemporary (2017) photograph of Potsdamer Platz, (Note: The blue pipe across the right page is to remove water during construction; these are found across Berlin.) echoing the drawing on page 18 of the place in 1928, and then with the coat of arms of Berlin from 1280.

Paragraph 175 (section of the German Criminal Code making homosexuality illegal) is mentioned on page 453, and elaborated in endnotes.

Organizations:

- A-I-Z: Arbeiter-Illustrierte-Zeitung (The Workers Pictorial Newspaper)
- Die Weltbühne (The World Stage), weekly magazine for which Kurt writes.
- Hitler Jugend (Hitler Youth)
- KJVD: Kommunistischer Jugendverband Deutschlands (Young Communist League of Germany)
- KPD: Kommunistische Partei Deutschlands (Communist Party of Germany)
- NSDAP: Nationalsozialistische Deutsche Arbeiterpartei (National Socialist German Workers' Party, Nazi Party)
- Schutzpolizei ("Schupo", Protection Police)
- SA: Sturmabteilung (Storm Detachment, "stormtroopers", "brownshirts")

Historical figures (in order of appearance): Joachim Ringelnatz, Carl von Ossietzky, Ernst Thälmann, Joseph Goebbels, Josephine Baker, Horst Wessel, and Adolf Hitler.

Other terms used include Gauleiter (roughly "Shire leader").
