= List of American films of 2012 =

This is a list of American films released in 2012.

== Box office ==
The highest-grossing American films released in 2012, by domestic box office gross revenue, are as follows:

Highest-grossing films of 2012
Rank	Title	Distributor	Domestic gross
1	The Avengers	Disney	$623,357,910
2	The Dark Knight Rises	Warner Bros.	$448,139,099
3	The Hunger Games	Lionsgate	$408,010,692
4	Skyfall	Sony	$304,360,277
5	The Hobbit: An Unexpected Journey	Warner Bros.	$303,003,568
6	The Twilight Saga: Breaking Dawn – Part 2	Lionsgate	$292,324,737
7	The Amazing Spider-Man	Sony	$262,030,663
8	Brave	Disney	$237,283,207
9	Ted	Universal	$218,815,487
10	Madagascar 3: Europe's Most Wanted	Paramount	$216,391,482

== January–March ==
Opening		Title	Production Company	Cast and crew	Ref.
J A N U A R Y	6	The Devil Inside	Paramount Pictures / Insurge Pictures	William Brent Bell (director/screenplay); Matthew Peterman (screenplay); Suzan Crowley, Fernanda Andrade, Simon Quarterman, Evan Helmuth, Bonnie Morgan, John Prosky, Ionut Grama, Brian Johnson	
J A N U A R Y	6	Beneath the Darkness	Sunset Pictures	Martin Guigui (director); Bruce Wilkinson (screenplay); Dennis Quaid, Tony Oller, Aimee Teegarden, Stephen Lunsford, Devon Werkheiser, Brett Cullen	
J A N U A R Y	13	Contraband	Universal Pictures / Relativity Media / Working Title Films	Baltasar Kormákur (director); Aaron Guzikowski (screenplay); Mark Wahlberg, Kate Beckinsale, Ben Foster, Giovanni Ribisi, Lukas Haas, Caleb Landry Jones, J.K. Simmons, Diego Luna, Robert Wahlberg, Jaqueline Fleming, William Lucking, David O'Hara, Kirk Bovill, Ólafur Darri Ólafsson, Jason Mitchell, Michael Beasley, Lucky Johnson, Viktor Hernandez	
J A N U A R Y	13	Joyful Noise	Warner Bros. Pictures / Alcon Entertainment	Todd Graff (director/screenplay); Queen Latifah, Dolly Parton, Kris Kristofferson, Jeremy Jordan, Keke Palmer, Dexter Darden, Courtney B. Vance, Jesse L. Martin, Andy Karl, DeQuina Moore, Francis Jue, Shameik Moore, Kirk Franklin, Karen Peck, Chloe Bailey, Paul Woolfolk	
J A N U A R Y	13	Beauty and the Beast 3D	Walt Disney Pictures / Walt Disney Animation Studios	Gary Trousdale, Kirk Wise (directors); Linda Woolverton (screenplay); Paige O'Hara, Robby Benson, Richard White, Jerry Orbach, David Ogden Stiers, Angela Lansbury, Bradley Pierce, Rex Everhart, Jesse Corti, Hal Smith, Jo Anne Worley, Mary Kay Bergman, Brian Cummings, Alvin Epstein, Tony Jay, Kimmy Robertson, Kath Soucie, Frank Welker, Jack Angel, Bruce Adler, Vanna Bonta, Liz Callaway, Philip L. Clarke, Jennifer Darling, Bill Farmer, Sherry Lynn, Caroline Peyton, Patrick Pinney, Phil Proctor, Gordon Stanley, Alec Murphy, Mickie McGowan, Scott Barnes, Maureen Brennan, Margery Daley	
J A N U A R Y	13	The Divide	Anchor Bay Films	Xavier Gens (director); Karl Mueller, Eron Sheean (screenplay); Lauren German, Michael Biehn, Milo Ventimiglia, Courtney B. Vance, Ivan Gonzalez, Michael Eklund, Abbey Thickson, Ashton Holmes, Rosanna Arquette	
J A N U A R Y	13	Don't Go in the Woods	Tribeca Film	Vincent D'Onofrio (director); Sam Bisbee, Joe Vinciguerra (screenplays)	
J A N U A R Y	13	Sing Your Song	S2BN Films	Susanne Rostock (director); Harry Belafonte	
J A N U A R Y	20	Haywire	Relativity Media	Steven Soderbergh (director); Lem Dobbs (screenplay); Gina Carano, Channing Tatum, Michael Angarano, Ewan McGregor, Michael Fassbender, Bill Paxton, Michael Douglas, Antonio Banderas, Mathieu Kassovitz, Anthony Brandon Wong, J.J. Perry, Aaron Cohen, Eddie J. Fernandez, Tim Connolly, Maximino Arciniega, Natascha Berg	
J A N U A R Y	20	Red Tails	20th Century Fox / Lucasfilm	Anthony Hemingway (director); John Ridley (screenplay); Cuba Gooding Jr., Nate Parker, David Oyelowo, Daniela Ruah, Terrence Howard, Tristan Wilds, Ne-Yo, Elijah Kelley, Marcus T. Paulk, Leslie Odom Jr., Michael B. Jordan, Method Man, Bryan Cranston, Kevin Phillips, Andre Royo, Lee Tergesen, Gerald McRaney, Robert Kazinsky, Josh Dallas, Aml Ameen, Rupert Penry-Jones	
J A N U A R Y	20	Underworld: Awakening	Screen Gems / Lakeshore Entertainment / Sketch Films	Måns Mårlind, Bjorn Stein (directors); Len Wiseman, John Hlavin, Allison Burnett, J. Michael Straczynski (screenplay); Kate Beckinsale, Theo James, India Eisley, Michael Ealy, Stephen Rea, Charles Dance, Sandrine Holt, Wes Bentley, Christian Tessier, Kurt Max Runte, Kris Holden-Ried, Catlin Adams, Jacob Blair	
J A N U A R Y	20	Coriolanus	The Weinstein Company / Hermetof Pictures / BBC Films / Lonely Dragon	Ralph Fiennes (director); John Logan (screenplay); Ralph Fiennes, Gerard Butler, Vanessa Redgrave, Brian Cox, Jessica Chastain, James Nesbitt, John Kani, Paul Jesson, Lubna Azabal, Ashraf Barhom, Dragan Mićanović, Slavko Štimac, Jon Snow, Slobodan Ninković, David Yelland, Nikki Amuka-Bird, Mona Hammond	
J A N U A R Y	20	W.E.	The Weinstein Company	Madonna (director/screenplay); Alek Keshishian (screenplay); Abbie Cornish, Oscar Isaac, James D'Arcy, Andrea Riseborough, Natalie Dormer, Richard Coyle, James Fox, Laurence Fox, David Harbour, Judy Parfitt, Haluk Bilginer, Geoffrey Palmer, Douglas Reith, Katie McGrath	
J A N U A R Y	27	The Grey	Open Road Films / LD Entertainment	Joe Carnahan (director/screenplay); Ian MacKenzie Jeffers (screenplay); Liam Neeson, Frank Grillo, Dermot Mulroney, Dallas Roberts, Joe Anderson, Nonso Anozie, James Badge Dale, Ben Bray, Greg Nicotero, Jacob Blair, Anne Openshaw	
J A N U A R Y	27	Man on a Ledge	Summit Entertainment	Asger Leth (director); Pablo Fenjves, Erich Hoeber, Jon Hoeber (screenplay); Sam Worthington, Elizabeth Banks, Jamie Bell, Anthony Mackie, Ed Burns, Titus Welliver, Genesis Rodriguez, Kyra Sedgwick, Ed Harris, Felix Solis, William Sadler, Pooja Kumar	
J A N U A R Y	27	One for the Money	Lionsgate / Lakeshore Entertainment / Sidney Kimmel Entertainment	Julie Anne Robinson (director); Karen Ray, Stacy Sherman, Liz Brixius (screenplay); Katherine Heigl, Debbie Reynolds, Jason O'Mara, Daniel Sunjata, Sherri Shepherd, Fisher Stevens, Patrick Fischler, John Leguizamo, Debra Monk, Nate Mooney, Ryan Michelle Bathe, Leonardo Nam, Annie Parisse, Danny Mastrogiorgio, Louis Mustillo, Joshua Elijah Reese, Olga Merediz	
J A N U A R Y	31	Treasure Buddies	Walt Disney Studios Home Entertainment / Key Pix Productions	Robert Vince (director/screenplay); Anna McRoberts (screenplay); Richard Riehle, Mason Cook, Adam Alexi-Malle, Lochlyn Munro, Mo Gallini, Christopher Maleki, Edward Herrmann, Skyler Gisondo, G. Hannelius, Ty Panitz, Tucker Albrizzi, Tim Conway, Ryan Stiles, Elaine Hendrix, Maulik Pancholy, Kaitlyn Maher, Bonnie Somerville, Ellie Harvie, Ranya Jaber, Anna Primiani, Charles Henry Wyson, Aidan Gemme, Tygh Runyan	
F E B R U A R Y	3	Big Miracle	Universal Pictures / Working Title Films	Ken Kwapis (director); Jack Amiel, Michael Begler (screenplay); John Krasinski, Drew Barrymore, Kristen Bell, Tim Blake Nelson, Dermot Mulroney, Ted Danson, Vinessa Shaw, Stephen Root, Kathy Baker, Rob Riggle, Michael Gaston, James LeGros, Mark Ivanir, Stefan Kapicic, Andrew Daly, Jonathan Slavin, Gregory Jbara, John Michael Higgins, Sarah Palin	
F E B R U A R Y	3	Chronicle	20th Century Fox / Davis Entertainment	Josh Trank (director/screenplay); Max Landis (screenplay); Dane DeHaan, Michael B. Jordan, Alex Russell, Michael Kelly, Ashley Hinshaw, Anna Wood, Crystal-Donna Roberts, Bo Petersen, Rudi Malcolm, Luke Tyler, Adrian Collins, Grant Powell, Armand Aucamp, Nicole Bailey	
F E B R U A R Y	3	The Woman in Black	CBS Films / Cross Creek Pictures	James Watkins (director); Jane Goldman (screenplay); Daniel Radcliffe, Ciarán Hinds, Janet McTeer, Liz White, Alisa Khazanova, Tim McMullan, Roger Allam, Daniel Cerqueira, Shaun Dooley, Mary Stockley, Cathy Sara, David Burke, Victor McGuire, Lucy May Barker, Jessica Raine, Sophie Stuckey	
F E B R U A R Y	10	Journey 2: The Mysterious Island	Warner Bros. Pictures / New Line Cinema / Walden Media	Brad Peyton (director); Mark Gunn, Brian Gunn (screenplay); Dwayne Johnson, Michael Caine, Josh Hutcherson, Vanessa Hudgens, Luis Guzmán, Kristin Davis, Branscombe Richmond	
F E B R U A R Y	10	Safe House	Universal Pictures / Relativity Media	Daniel Espinosa (director); David Guggenheim (screenplay); Denzel Washington, Ryan Reynolds, Sam Shepard, Robert Patrick, Liam Cunningham, Brendan Gleeson, Vera Farmiga, Fares Fares, Nora Arnezeder, Joel Kinnaman, Rubén Blades	
F E B R U A R Y	10	The Vow	Screen Gems / Spyglass Entertainment	Michael Sucsy (director); Abby Kohn, Marc Silverstein, Jason Katims (screenplay); Rachel McAdams, Channing Tatum, Scott Speedman, Jessica Lange, Sam Neill, Jessica McNamee, Wendy Crewson, Tatiana Maslany, Lucas Bryant, Joey Klein, Joe Cobden, Jeananne Goossen, Dillon Casey, Shannon Barnett, Britt Irvin, Sarah Carter, Rachel Skarsten, Lindsay Ames, Kristina Pešić	
F E B R U A R Y	10	Star Wars: Episode I – The Phantom Menace 3D	20th Century Fox / Lucasfilm	George Lucas (director/screenplay); Liam Neeson, Ewan McGregor, Natalie Portman, Jake Lloyd, Ahmed Best, Pernilla August, Ian McDiarmid, Anthony Daniels, Kenny Baker, Frank Oz, Ray Park, Silas Carson, Sofia Coppola, Keira Knightley, Samuel L. Jackson, Oliver Ford Davies, Hugh Quarshie, Terence Stamp, Brian Blessed, Andy Secombe, Lewis MacLeod, Warwick Davis, Steve Speirs, Jerome St. John Blake, Alan Ruscoe, Ralph Brown, Celia Imrie, Benedict Taylor, Clarence Smith, Dominic West, Cristina da Silva, Liz Wilson, Bronagh Gallagher, Greg Proops, Scott Capurro, Mark Coulier, Lindsay Duncan, Peter Serafinowicz, James Taylor, Richard Armitage, Ben Burtt, Doug Chiang, Rob Coleman, Roman Coppola, Sean Cronin, Sally Hawkins, John Knoll, Rick McCallum, Lorne Peterson, Christopher Scarabosio, Christian Simpson, Scott Squires, Matthew Wood	
F E B R U A R Y	10	Exit Strategy	Ask Around Entertainment / The Film Group	Michael Whitton (director); Jameel Saleem (screenplay);	
F E B R U A R Y	10	Rampart	Millennium Entertainment	Oren Moverman (director); James Ellroy (screenplay); Woody Harrelson, Ben Foster, Robin Wright, Sigourney Weaver, Steve Buscemi, Anne Heche, Cynthia Nixon, Ice Cube, Brie Larson, Ned Beatty, Don Creech, Jon Bernthal, Jon Foster, Robert Ray Wisdom, Audra McDonald	
F E B R U A R Y	17	Ghost Rider: Spirit of Vengeance	Columbia Pictures / Hyde Park Entertainment / Imagination Adu Dhabi / Crystal Sky / Marvel Knights	Mark Neveldine, Brian Taylor (directors); Scott Dimple, Seth Hoffman, David Goyer (screenplay); Nicolas Cage, Idris Elba, Fergus Riordan, Ciarán Hinds, Violante Placido, Johnny Whitworth, Christopher Lambert, Anthony Stewart Head, Jacek Koman, Vincent Regan, Spencer Wilding	
F E B R U A R Y	17	This Means War	20th Century Fox / Overbrook Entertainment	McG (director); Timothy Dowling, Simon Kinberg (screenplay); Tom Hardy, Chris Pine, Reese Witherspoon, Chelsea Handler, Til Schweiger, Abigail Spencer, Warren Christie, John Paul Ruttan, Angela Bassett, Rosemary Harris, Jenny Slate, Michael Papajohn, Rebel Wilson, David Koechner	
F E B R U A R Y	18	The Cohasset Snuff Film	Found TV / MVD Entertainment Group	Edward Payson (director/screenplay); Darnell J. Taylor (screenplay); Stephen Wu, Kelly Marie Tran, Maria Olsen	
F E B R U A R Y	24	Act of Valor	Relativity Media	"Mouse" McCoy, Scott Waugh (directors); Kurt Johnstad (screenplay); Active Duty Navy SEALs, Roselyn Sánchez, Alex Veadov, Jason Cottle, Nestor Serrano, Derrick Van Orden, Rorke Denver, Emilio Rivera, Ernie Reyes Jr., Keo Woolford, Thomas Rosales Jr., Antoni Corone	
F E B R U A R Y	24	Gone	Summit Entertainment / Lakeshore Entertainment / Sidney Kimmel Entertainment	Heitor Dhalia (director); Allison Burnett (screenplay); Amanda Seyfried, Jennifer Carpenter, Sebastian Stan, Wes Bentley, Michael Paré, Daniel Sunjata, Nick Searcy, Socratis Otto, Emily Wickersham, Joel David Moore, Katherine Moennig, Ted Rooney, Jeanine Jackson, Hunter Parrish	
F E B R U A R Y	24	Good Deeds	Lionsgate / Tyler Perry Studios	Tyler Perry (director/screenplay); Tyler Perry, Thandie Newton, Rebecca Romijn, Brian J. White, Jamie Kennedy, Eddie Cibrian, Jordenn Thompson, Beverly Johnson, Phylicia Rashad, Gabrielle Union	
F E B R U A R Y	24	Wanderlust	Universal Pictures / Relativity Media	David Wain (director/screenplay); Ken Marino (screenplay); Paul Rudd, Jennifer Aniston, Malin Åkerman, Justin Theroux, Ken Marino, Lauren Ambrose, Joe Lo Truglio, Kerri Kenney-Silver, Kathryn Hahn, Alan Alda, Jessica St. Clair, Jordan Peele, Michaela Watkins, Linda Lavin, Ray Liotta, Keegan-Michael Key, David Wain, Michael Ian Black, Michael Showalter	
M A R C H	2	Dr. Seuss' The Lorax	Universal Pictures / Illumination Entertainment	Chris Renaud, Kyle Balda (directors); Cinco Paul and Ken Daurio (screenplay); Danny DeVito, Zac Efron, Taylor Swift, Ed Helms, Rob Riggle, Betty White, Jenny Slate, Nasim Pedrad, Stephen Tobolowsky, Elmarie Wendel, Danny Cooksey, Chris Renaud, Joel Swetow, Michael Beattie, Dave Mitchell, Jack Angel, Bob Bergen, John Cygan, Debi Derryberry, Bill Farmer, Jess Harnell, Sherry Lynn, Danny Mann, Mona Marshall, Laraine Newman, Jan Rabson, Jim Ward, Dan Navarro, Mickie McGowan, Dempsey Pappion, Claira Nicole Titman, Monique Donnelly, Edie Lehmann Boddicker, Fletcher Sheridan	
M A R C H	2	Project X	Warner Bros. Pictures / Silver Pictures / Green Hat Films	Nima Nourizadeh (director); Matt Drake, Michael Bacall (screenplay); Miles Teller, Oliver Cooper, Jonathan Daniel Brown, Kirby Bliss Blanton, Thomas Mann, Alexis Knapp, Martin Klebba, Rick Shapiro, Caitlin Dulany, Peter Mackenzie, Nichole Bloom, Jesse Marco, Jillian Reynolds, Jimmy Kimmel	
M A R C H	2	Being Flynn	Focus Features	Paul Weitz (director/screenplay); Robert De Niro, Paul Dano, Olivia Thirlby, Lili Taylor, Wes Studi, Julianne Moore, Dale Dickey, Victor Rasuk, Katherine Waterston, Billy Wirth	
M A R C H	2	Tim and Eric's Billion Dollar Movie	Magnet Releasing	Tim Heidecker, Eric Wareheim (director/screenplay); Tim Heidecker, Eric Wareheim, Will Ferrell, Zach Galifianakis, John C. Reilly, Robert Loggia, Jeff Goldblum, Will Forte, William Atherton, Erica Durance, Ray Wise, Twink Caplan, Bob Odenkirk, Palmer Scott, Todd Wagner, Mark Cuban, Michael Gross, A.D. Miles, Ron Lynch, Robert Axelrod, David Liebe Hart, Michael Q. Schmidt, Doug Lussenhop	
M A R C H	9	John Carter	Walt Disney Pictures	Andrew Stanton (director/screenplay); Mark Andrews, Michael Chabon (screenplay); Taylor Kitsch, Lynn Collins, Samantha Morton, Mark Strong, Ciarán Hinds, Dominic West, James Purefoy, Willem Dafoe, Thomas Haden Church, Bryan Cranston, Daryl Sabara, Polly Walker, David Schwimmer, Jon Favreau, Don Stark, Nicholas Woodeson, Art Malik	
M A R C H	9	Silent House	Open Road Films / LD Entertainment	Chris Kentis (director); Laura Lau (director/screenplay); Elizabeth Olsen, Adam Trese, Eric Sheffer Stevens, Julia Taylor Ross, Haley Murphy, Adam Barnett	
M A R C H	9	A Thousand Words	Paramount Pictures / DreamWorks Pictures	Brian Robbins (director); Steve Koren (screenplay); Eddie Murphy, Kerry Washington, Cliff Curtis, Clark Duke, Allison Janney, Ruby Dee, John Witherspoon, Emanuel Ragsdale, Justina Machado, Steve Little, Jack McBrayer, Kayla Blake, Lennie Loftin, Alain Chabat, Ted Kennedy	
M A R C H	9	Friends with Kids	Lionsgate / Roadside Attractions	Jennifer Westfeldt (director/screenplay); Adam Scott, Jennifer Westfeldt, Jon Hamm, Kristen Wiig, Maya Rudolph, Chris O'Dowd, Megan Fox, Edward Burns, Lee Bryant, Kelly Bishop, Cotter Smith, Ilana Levine, Brian d'Arcy James, John Lutz, Derek Cecil	
M A R C H	9	Jiro Dreams of Sushi	Magnolia Pictures	David Gelb (director)	
M A R C H	10	Game Change	HBO Films / Playtone	Jay Roach (director); Danny Strong (screenplay); Julianne Moore, Woody Harrelson, Ed Harris, Peter MacNicol, Jamey Sheridan, Sarah Paulson, Ron Livingston, David Barry Gray, Larry Sullivan, Melissa Farman, Kevin Bigley, Brian d'Arcy James, Bruce Altman, Colby French, John Rothman, Sandy Bainum, Tiffany Thornton, Alex Hyde-White, Justin Gaston, Austin Pendleton, Spencer Garrett, Brian Howe, Ron Perkins, Brittany Underwood, Jenna Stern, Sidney Blackmer, Rain Pryor, Ashlie Atkinson, Mark Halperin, John Heilemann, Barack Obama, Joe Biden, Anderson Cooper, Katie Couric, Wolf Blitzer, Candy Crowley, Charles Gibson, John King, Sean Hannity, Pat Buchanan, Jack Cafferty, Susan Collins, John Edwards, Tina Fey, Amy Poehler, Newt Gingrich, Paris Hilton, Kay Bailey Hutchison, Linda Lingle, Rachel Maddow, Lawrence O'Donnell, Keith Olbermann, Britney Spears, Brian Williams, Fareed Zakaria	
M A R C H	16	21 Jump Street	Columbia Pictures / Metro-Goldwyn-Mayer / Relativity Media / Original Film	Phil Lord, Chris Miller (directors/screenplay); Michael Bacall (screenplay); Jonah Hill, Channing Tatum, Ice Cube, Brie Larson, Rob Riggle, DeRay Davis, Dave Franco, Jake Johnson, Johnny Simmons, Johnny Pemberton, Dakota Johnson, Ellie Kemper, Johnny Depp, Chris Parnell, Nick Offerman, Holly Robinson Peete, Justin Hires, Lindsey Broad, Caroline Aaron, Joe Chrest, Rye Rye, Spencer Boldman, Luis Da Silva, Peter DeLuise	
M A R C H	16	Casa de Mi Padre	Pantelion Films / Lionsgate	Matt Piedmont (director); Andrew Steele (screenplay); Will Ferrell, Gael García Bernal, Diego Luna, Nick Offerman, Génesis Rodríguez, Efren Ramirez, Adrian Martinez, Pedro Armendáriz Jr., Sandra Echeverría, Alejandro Patino, Dan Haggerty, José Luis Rodríguez, Patty Guggenheim, Molly Shannon, Thomas Rosales Jr., Christina Aguilera	
M A R C H	16	Jeff, Who Lives at Home	Paramount Vantage / Indian Paintbrush	Mark Duplass, Jay Duplass (directors/screenplay); Jason Segel, Ed Helms, Judy Greer, Susan Sarandon, Evan Ross, Rae Dawn Chong, Steve Zissis, Raion Hill, Lance E. Nichols, Carol Sutton, Joe Chrest, Katie Aselton, J.D. Evermore, Matt Malloy, Jennifer Lafleur	
M A R C H	23	The Hunger Games	Lionsgate	Gary Ross (director/screenplay); Suzanne Collins, Billy Ray (screenplay); Jennifer Lawrence, Josh Hutcherson, Liam Hemsworth, Woody Harrelson, Elizabeth Banks, Lenny Kravitz, Stanley Tucci, Donald Sutherland, Wes Bentley, Toby Jones, Alexander Ludwig, Isabelle Fuhrman, Amandla Stenberg, Jacqueline Emerson, Jack Quaid, Leven Rambin, Dayo Okeniyi, Willow Shields, Paula Malcomson, Kimiko Gelman, Nelson Ascencio, Latarsha Rose, Ian Nelson, Mackenzie Lintz, Annie Thurman, Rhoda Griffis, Jackie Evancho, Tucker Gates, Tara Macken, Taylor John Smith	
M A R C H	30	Mirror Mirror	Relativity Media	Tarsem Singh (director); Jason Keller, Melisa Wallack (screenplay); Lily Collins, Julia Roberts, Armie Hammer, Nathan Lane, Robert Emms, Mare Winningham, Michael Lerner, Mark Povinelli, Jordan Prentice, Danny Woodburn, Sebastian Saraceno, Ronald Lee Clark, Martin Klebba, Joey Gnoffo, Sean Bean, Frank Welker	
M A R C H	30	Wrath of the Titans	Warner Bros. Pictures / Legendary Pictures	Jonathan Liebesman (director); Dan Mazeau, David Leslie Johnson (screenplay); Sam Worthington, Liam Neeson, Ralph Fiennes, Édgar Ramírez, Rosamund Pike, Danny Huston, Bill Nighy, Toby Kebbell, Lily James	
M A R C H	30	Goon	Magnet Releasing	Michael Dowse (director); Jay Baruchel, Evan Goldberg (screenplay); Seann William Scott, Jay Baruchel, Liev Schreiber, Alison Pill, Marc-André Grondin	

== April–June ==
Opening		Title	Production Company	Cast and crew	Ref.
A P R I L	4	Titanic 3D	Paramount Pictures / 20th Century Fox / Lightstorm Entertainment	James Cameron (director/screenplay); Leonardo DiCaprio, Kate Winslet, Billy Zane, Kathy Bates, Francis Fisher, Gloria Stuart, Bill Paxton, Bernard Hill, David Warner, Victor Garber, Jonathan Hyde, Eric Braeden, Bernard Fox, Suzy Amis, Danny Nucci, Ioan Gruffudd, Michael Ensign, Simon Crane, Jason Barry, Mark Lindsay Chapman, Ewan Stewart, Jonathan Phillips, James Lancaster, Elsa Raven, Martin Jarvis, Rosalind Ayres, Paul Brightwell, Gregory Cooke, Craig Kelly, Liam Tuohy, Terry Forrestal, Anatoly Sagalevich, Edward Kamuda, Jonathan Evans-Jones, Lewis Abernathy, Edward Fletcher, Lew Palter, Rochelle Rose, Scott G. Anderson, Martin East, Anders Falk, Nicholas Cascone, Karen Kamuda	
A P R I L	6	American Reunion	Universal Pictures / Relativity Media	Jon Hurwitz, Hayden Schlossberg (directors/screenplay); Jason Biggs, Alyson Hannigan, Chris Klein, Thomas Ian Nicholas, Tara Reid, Seann William Scott, Mena Suvari, Eddie Kaye Thomas, Natasha Lyonne, Shannon Elizabeth, Eugene Levy, Jennifer Coolidge, John Cho, Dania Ramirez, Katrina Bowden, Jay Harrington, Ali Cobrin, Chuck Hittinger, Chris Owen, Justin Isfeld, Charlene Amoia, Neil Patrick Harris, Molly Cheek, Rebecca De Mornay	
A P R I L	6	Comic-Con Episode IV: A Fan's Hope	Wrekin Hill Entertainment	Morgan Spurlock (director/screenplay); Jeremy Chilnick (screenplay); Skip Harvey, Eric Henson, Chuck Rozanski, James Darling, Se Young Kang	
A P R I L	6	Damsels in Distress	Sony Pictures Classics	Whit Stillman (director/screenplay); Greta Gerwig, Adam Brody, Analeigh Tipton, Megalyn Echikunwoke, Carrie MacLemore, Hugo Becker, Billy Magnussen, Ryan Metcalf, Jermaine Crawford, Aubrey Plaza	
A P R I L	13	The Cabin in the Woods	Lionsgate / Mutant Enemy Productions	Drew Goddard (director/screenplay); Joss Whedon (screenplay); Richard Jenkins, Bradley Whitford, Jesse Williams, Chris Hemsworth, Kristen Connolly, Anna Hutchison, Fran Kranz, Brian J. White, Amy Acker, Tim DeZarn, Tom Lenk, Dan Payne, Jodelle Ferland, Dan Shea, Rukiya Bernard, Peter Kelamis, Adrian Holmes, Chelah Horsdal, Terry Chen, Heather Doerksen, Patrick Sabongui, Ellie Harvie, Sigourney Weaver, Terry Notary	
A P R I L	13	Detention	Detention Films	Joseph Kahn (director/screenplay); Mark Palermo (screenplay); Josh Hutcherson, Shanley Caswell, Spencer Locke, Dane Cook	
A P R I L	13	The Three Stooges	20th Century Fox	Bobby Farrelly, Peter Farrelly (directors/screenplay); Mike Cerrone (screenplay); Chris Diamantopoulos, Sean Hayes, Will Sasso, Jane Lynch, Larry David, Stephen Collins, Sofía Vergara, Jennifer Hudson, Craig Bierko, Kirby Heyborne, Emy Coligado, Avalon Robbins, Max Charles, Brian Doyle-Murray, Lin Shaye, Carly Craig, Kate Upton, Marianne Leone, Robert Capron, Skyler Gisondo, Isaiah Mustafa, Nicole "Snooki" Polizzi, Mike "The Situation" Sorrentino, Jennifer "JWoww" Farley, Ronnie Ortiz-Magro, Sammi "Sweetheart" Giancola, Dwight Howard, Antonio Sabàto Jr., Lance Chantiles-Wertz	
A P R I L	20	Chimpanzee	Disneynature	Alastair Fothergill, Mark Linfield (directors); Tim Allen (narrator)	
A P R I L	20	The Lucky One	Warner Bros. Pictures / Village Roadshow Pictures	Scott Hicks (director); Will Fetters (screenplay); Zac Efron, Taylor Schilling, Jay R. Ferguson, Riley Thomas Stewart, Adam LeFevre, Blythe Danner	
A P R I L	20	Think Like a Man	Screen Gems / Rainforest Films	Tim Story (director); Keith Merryman, David A. Newman (screenplay); Kevin Hart, Michael Ealy, Taraji P. Henson, Jerry Ferrara, Meagan Good, Regina Hall, Terrence J, Jenifer Lewis, Romany Malco, Gary Owen, Gabrielle Union, Steve Harvey, Wendy Williams, Chris Brown, Keri Hilson, La La Anthony, Morris Chestnut, Arielle Kebbel, Kelly Rowland, Sherri Shepherd, Tika Sumpter, Tony Rock, Luenell, Jessica Camacho, Matt Colton, J. Anthony Brown, Matt Barnes, Shannon Brown, Rasual Butler, Darren Collison, Lisa Leslie, Metta World Peace	
A P R I L	20	Darling Companion	Sony Pictures Classics	Lawrence Kasdan (director/screenplay); Meg Kasdan (screenplay); Kevin Kline, Diane Keaton, Richard Jenkins, Elisabeth Moss, Mark Duplass, Dianne Wiest, Sam Shepard, Ayelet Zurer, Jay Ali	
A P R I L	20	Jesus Henry Christ	Entertainment One Films	Dennis Lee (director/screenplay); Toni Collette, Michael Sheen, Jason Spevack, Samantha Weinstein	
A P R I L	20	Marley	Magnolia Pictures	Kevin Macdonald (director); Bob Marley	
A P R I L	27	The Five-Year Engagement	Universal Pictures / Relativity Media	Nicholas Stoller (director/screenplay); Jason Segel (screenplay); Jason Segel, Emily Blunt, Chris Pratt, Alison Brie, Rhys Ifans, Mimi Kennedy, David Paymer, Jacki Weaver, Jim Piddock, Jane Carr, Michael Ensign, Mindy Kaling, Adam Campbell, Kevin Hart, Randall Park, Brian Posehn, Chris Parnell, Lauren Weedman, Tracee Chimo, Dakota Johnson, Tim Heidecker, Kumail Nanjiani, Gerry Bednob, Molly Shannon, Da'Vone McDonald	
A P R I L	27	The Pirates! In an Adventure with Scientists!	Columbia Pictures / Sony Pictures Animation / Aardman Animations	Peter Lord, Jeff Newitt (directors); Gideon Defoe (screenplay); Hugh Grant, Salma Hayek, Jeremy Piven, Imelda Staunton, David Tennant, Martin Freeman, Lenny Henry, Brendan Gleeson, Brian Blessed, Anton Yelchin, Ashley Jensen, Al Roker, Mike Cooper, David Schneider	
A P R I L	27	The Raven	Relativity Media	James McTeigue (director); Ben Livingston, Hannah Shakespeare (screenplay); John Cusack, Alice Eve, Luke Evans, Brendan Gleeson, Oliver Jackson-Cohen, Jimmy Yuill, Kevin McNally, Sam Hazeldine, Pam Ferris, John Warnaby, Brendan Coyle	
A P R I L	27	Safe	Lionsgate	Boaz Yakin (director/screenplay); Jason Statham, Catherine Chan, Chris Sarandon, Anson Mount, Robert John Burke, James Hong, Reggie Lee, Sándor Técsy, Joseph Sikora, Danny Hoch, Matt O'Toole	
A P R I L	27	Sound of My Voice	Fox Searchlight Pictures	Zal Batmanglij (director/screenplay); Brit Marling, Christopher Denham, Nicole Vicius, Avery Pohl	
M A Y	4	The Avengers	Marvel Studios	Joss Whedon (director/screenplay); Robert Downey Jr., Chris Evans, Mark Ruffalo, Chris Hemsworth, Scarlett Johansson, Jeremy Renner, Tom Hiddleston, Stellan Skarsgård, Samuel L. Jackson, Clark Gregg, Cobie Smulders, Gwyneth Paltrow, Paul Bettany, Alexis Denisof, Tina Benko, Jerzy Skolimowski, Powers Boothe, Jenny Agutter, Donald Li, Warren Kole, Alicia Sixtos, Jesse Garcia, Maximiliano Hernández, Kenneth Tigar, Walter Perez, Harry Dean Stanton, Josh Cowdery, Ashley Johnson, Robert Clohessy, Enver Gjokaj, Robin Swoboda, Jamie McShane, Romy Rosemont, James Eckhouse, Stan Lee, Pat Kiernan, Thomas Roberts, Damion Poitier, Lou Ferrigno, Jillian Morgese, Jimmy Star, Colin Strause	
M A Y	4	First Position	IFC Films	Bess Kargman (director)	
M A Y	11	Dark Shadows	Warner Bros. Pictures / Village Roadshow Pictures	Tim Burton (director); Seth Grahame-Smith (screenplay); Johnny Depp, Michelle Pfeiffer, Helena Bonham Carter, Eva Green, Jackie Earle Haley, Bella Heathcote, Chloë Grace Moretz, Jonny Lee Miller, Gulliver McGrath, Christopher Lee, Alice Cooper, William Hope, Ivan Kaye, Raffey Cassidy, Ray Shirley, Susanna Cappellaro, Guy Flanagan, Sophie Kennedy Clark, Hannah Murray, Shane Rimmer, Jonathan Frid, Lara Parker, David Selby, Kathryn Leigh Scott	
M A Y	16	The Dictator	Paramount Pictures / Four By Two Films	Larry Charles (director); Sacha Baron Cohen, Alec Berg, Jeff Schaffer, David Mandel (screenplay); Sacha Baron Cohen, Ben Kingsley, Anna Faris, Megan Fox, John C. Reilly, J.B. Smoove, Jason Mantzoukas, Bobby Lee, Sayed Badreya, Adeel Akhtar, Fred Armisen, Edward Norton, Adam LeFevre, Busty Heart, Chris Elliott, Garry Shandling, Chris Parnell, Aasif Mandvi, Rizwan Manji, Horatio Sanz, Fred Melamed, Joey Slotnick, Jessica St. Clair, Kathryn Hahn, Anna Katarina, Kevin Corrigan, Sondra James, Jon Glaser, Nasim Pedrad	
M A Y	18	Battleship	Universal Pictures / Hasbro Studios / Bluegrass Films / Film 44	Peter Berg (director); Jon Hoeber, Erich Hoeber (screenplay); Alexander Skarsgård, Taylor Kitsch, Brooklyn Decker, Rihanna, Liam Neeson, Asano Tadanobu, Peter MacNicol, Hamish Linklater, Jesse Plemons, Jerry Ferrara, Robin Atkin Downes, John Tui, Gregory D. Gadson, Adam Godley, Stephen Bishop, Josh Pence, Rami Malek, Louis Lombardi, Gary Grubbs, Peter Berg, Bill Stinchcomb, Joe Chrest, Billy Slaughter, Griff Furst, Michelle Arthur, Jackie Johnson, Zach Selwyn, Ray Mabus, John Bell, Adrian Bellani	
M A Y	18	What to Expect When You're Expecting	Lionsgate / Alcon Entertainment / Phoenix Pictures	Kirk Jones (director); Heather Hach, Shauna Cross (screenplay); Cameron Diaz, Jennifer Lopez, Brooklyn Decker, Elizabeth Banks, Anna Kendrick, Chace Crawford, Matthew Morrison, Dennis Quaid, Chris Rock, Rodrigo Santoro, Ben Falcone, Joe Manganiello, Thomas Lennon, Rob Huebel, Amir Talai, Rebel Wilson, Wendi McLendon-Covey, Dwyane Wade, Whitney Port, Megan Mullally, Kim Fields, Jesse Burch, Mimi Gianopulos, Genesis Rodriguez	
M A Y	18	Crooked Arrows	Freestyle Releasing	Steve Rash (director); Todd Baird, Brad Riddell (screenplay); Brandon Routh, Gil Birmingham	
M A Y	18	Entrance	IFC Midnight	Patrick Horvath, Dallas Hallam (director); Suziey Block	
M A Y	18	Lovely Molly	Image Entertainment	Eduardo Sánchez (director); Gretchen Lodge, Johnny Lewis, Alexandra Holden, Lauren Lakis	
M A Y	18	Virginia	Entertainment One	Dustin Lance Black (director/screenplay); Jennifer Connelly, Ed Harris, Emma Roberts, Amy Madigan, Harrison Gilbertson	
M A Y	25	Chernobyl Diaries	Warner Bros. Pictures / Alcon Entertainment / FilmNation Entertainment / Oren Peli/Brian Witten Pictures	Bradley Parker (director); Oren Peli, Carey Van Dyke, Steve Van Dyke (screenplay); Jonathan Sadowski, Devin Kelley, Jesse McCartney, Olivia Taylor Dudley, Nathan Phillips, Ingrid Bolsø Berdal, Dimitri Diatchenko, Miloš Timotijević, Alex Feldman, Kristof Konrad, Pasha D. Lychnikoff	
M A Y	25	Men in Black 3	Columbia Pictures / P+M Image Nation / Amblin Entertainment	Barry Sonnenfeld (director); Etan Cohen, David Koepp, Jeff Nathanson, Michael Soccio (screenplay); Will Smith, Tommy Lee Jones, Josh Brolin, Jemaine Clement, Emma Thompson, Alice Eve, Michael Stuhlbarg, Nicole Scherzinger, David Rasche, Mike Colter, Michael Chernus, Keone Young, Bill Hader, Lenny Venito, David Pittu, Lanny Flaherty, Barry Sonnenfeld, Justin Bieber, Lady Gaga, Yao Ming, Tim Burton, Rick Baker, Will Arnett, Kevin Covais, Bill Gates, Jada Pinkett Smith, Tony Shalhoub, Howard Stern, Rip Torn, Bo Welch, Steve Witting, Tim Blaney, Brad Abrell, Thom Fountain, Carl J. Johnson	
M A Y	25	Moonrise Kingdom	Focus Features	Wes Anderson (director/screenplay); Roman Coppola (screenplay); Jared Gilman, Kara Hayward, Bruce Willis, Edward Norton, Bill Murray, Frances McDormand, Jason Schwartzman, Tilda Swinton, Larry Pine, Marianna Bassham, Neal Huff, Eric Chase Anderson, Harvey Keitel, Bob Balaban	
M A Y	28	Hemingway & Gellhorn	HBO Films	Philip Kaufman (director); Jerry Stahl, Barbara Turner (screenplay); Nicole Kidman, Clive Owen, David Strathairn, Molly Parker, Parker Posey, Rodrigo Santoro, Mark Pellegrino, Peter Coyote, Lars Ulrich, Robert Duvall, Tony Shalhoub, Jeffrey Jones, Santiago Cabrera, Diane Baker, Steven Wiig, Keone Young, Joan Chen, Ivonne Coll, Saverio Guerra, Remy Auberjonois, Anthony Brandon Wong, Geoff Callan, Bubba Lewis, Brooke Adams, Monica Barbaro, Hélène Cardona, Connie Nielsen, Leonard Apeltsin, Aitor Inarra, Malcolm Brownson	
J U N E	1	Snow White and the Huntsman	Universal Pictures / Roth Films	Rupert Sanders (director); Evan Daugherty, Hossein Amini, John Lee Hancock (screenplay); Charlize Theron, Kristen Stewart, Chris Hemsworth, Sam Spruell, Ian McShane, Bob Hoskins, Ray Winstone, Eddie Marsan, Sam Claflin, Nick Frost, Toby Jones, Brian Gleeson, Vincent Regan, Raffey Cassidy, Lily Cole, Noah Huntley, Liberty Ross, Chris Obi, Rachael Stirling, Hattie Gotobed, Greg Hicks, Peter Ferdinando, Anastasia Hille, Matt Berry, Johnny Harris, Izzy Meikle-Small	
J U N E	1	Piranha 3DD	Dimension Films	John Gulager (director); Patrick Melton, Marcus Dunstan (screenplay); Danielle Panabaker, Matt Bush, Chris Zylka, David Koechner, Meagan Tandy, Paul James Jordan, Jean-Luc Bilodeau, Héctor Jiménez, Adrian Martinez, Clu Gulager, Gary Busey, Katrina Bowden, Christopher Lloyd, Ving Rhames, Paul Scheer, David Hasselhoff	
J U N E	8	Madagascar 3: Europe's Most Wanted	Paramount Pictures / DreamWorks Animation	Eric Darnell (director/screenplay); Tom McGrath, Conrad Vernon (directors); Noah Baumbach (screenplay); Ben Stiller, Chris Rock, David Schwimmer, Jada Pinkett Smith, Sacha Baron Cohen, Cedric the Entertainer, Andy Richter, Tom McGrath, Frances McDormand, Jessica Chastain, Martin Short, Bryan Cranston, Chris Miller, Christopher Knights, John DiMaggio, Frank Welker, Paz Vega, Conrad Vernon, Vinnie Jones, Steve Jones, Nick Fletcher, Eric Darnell, Dan O'Connor, Danny Jacobs	
J U N E	8	Prometheus	20th Century Fox / Dune Entertainment / Scott Free Productions	Ridley Scott (director); Damon Lindelof, Jon Spaihts (screenplay); Noomi Rapace, Michael Fassbender, Charlize Theron, Idris Elba, Guy Pearce, Logan Marshall-Green, Sean Harris, Rafe Spall, Kate Dickie, Emun Elliott, Benedict Wong, Patrick Wilson, Ian Whyte	
J U N E	8	Lola Versus	Fox Searchlight Pictures	Daryl Wein (director/screenplay); Zoe Lister-Jones (screenplay); Greta Gerwig, Joel Kinnaman, Zoe Lister-Jones, Hamish Linklater, Bill Pullman, Ebon Moss-Bachrach, Jay Pharoah, Debra Winger, Cheyenne Jackson, Parisa Fitz-Henley, Maria Dizzia	
J U N E	8	Safety Not Guaranteed	FilmDistrict	Colin Trevorrow (director/screenplay); Derek Connolly (screenplay); Aubrey Plaza, Mark Duplass, Jake Johnson, Kristen Bell, Jenica Bergere, Jeff Garlin, Karan Soni, Lynn Shelton, Mary Lynn Rajskub, William Hall Jr.	
J U N E	15	Rock of Ages	Warner Bros. Pictures / New Line Cinema	Adam Shankman (director); Justin Theroux, Allan Loeb, Chris D'Arienzo (screenplay); Julianne Hough, Diego Boneta, Tom Cruise, Alec Baldwin, Russell Brand, Paul Giamatti, Catherine Zeta-Jones, Malin Åkerman, Mary J. Blige, Bryan Cranston, Will Forte, Dan Finnerty, Kevin Nash, Jeff Chase, Constantine Maroulis, Kevin Cronin, Sebastian Bach, Debbie Gibson, Nuno Bettencourt, Joel Hoekstra, Eli Roth, T.J. Miller	
J U N E	15	That's My Boy	Columbia Pictures / Relativity Media / Happy Madison Productions	Sean Anders (director); David Caspe (screenplay); Adam Sandler, Andy Samberg, Leighton Meester, Vanilla Ice, Tony Orlando, Will Forte, Milo Ventimiglia, Susan Sarandon, James Caan, Blake Clark, Meagen Fay, Rachel Dratch, Nick Swardson, Peggy Stewart, Luenell, Ciara, Ana Gasteyer, Eva Amurri Martino, Todd Bridges, Dan Patrick, Rex Ryan, Jackie Sandler, Erin Andrews, Peter Dante, Alan Thicke, Ian Ziering, Colin Quinn, Baron Davis, Dennis Dugan	
J U N E	15	Your Sister's Sister	IFC Films	Lynn Shelton (director/screenplay); Emily Blunt, Rosemarie DeWitt, Mark Duplass	
J U N E	20	Kumaré	Kino Lorber	Vikram Gandhi (director); Vikram Gandhi	
J U N E	22	Abraham Lincoln: Vampire Hunter	20th Century Fox / Dune Entertainment	Timur Bekmambetov (director); Seth Grahame-Smith (screenplay); Benjamin Walker, Dominic Cooper, Anthony Mackie, Mary Elizabeth Winstead, Rufus Sewell, Marton Csokas, Jimmi Simpson, Joseph Mawle, Robin McLeavy, Erin Wasson, John Rothman, Jaqueline Fleming, Alan Tudyk, Cameron M. Brown, Frank Brennan	
J U N E	22	Brave	Walt Disney Pictures / Pixar Animation Studios	Mark Andrews, Brenda Chapman, Steve Purcell (directors/screenplay); Irene Mecchi (screenplay); Kelly Macdonald, Julie Walters, Billy Connolly, Emma Thompson, Kevin McKidd, Craig Ferguson, Robbie Coltrane, Steve Purcell, Patrick Doyle, John Ratzenberger, Steven Cree, Sally Kinghorn, Eilidh Fraser, Callum O'Neill, Peigi Barker	
J U N E	22	Seeking a Friend for the End of the World	Focus Features / Mandate Pictures / Indian Paintbrush	Lorene Scafaria (director/screenplay); Steve Carell, Keira Knightley, Connie Britton, Adam Brody, Derek Luke, Melanie Lynskey, William Petersen, Tonita Castro, Mark Moses, Patton Oswalt, Rob Corddry, Rob Huebel, Gillian Jacobs, T.J. Miller, Amy Schumer, Jim O'Heir, Martin Sheen, Nancy Carell, Roger Aaron Brown	
J U N E	22	The Invisible War	Docurama Films	Kirby Dick (director/screenplay);	
J U N E	22	To Rome with Love	Sony Pictures Classics	Woody Allen (director/screenplay); Alec Baldwin, Roberto Benigni, Penélope Cruz, Jesse Eisenberg, Greta Gerwig, Elliot Page, Judy Davis, Alison Pill, Fabio Armiliato, Alessandra Mastronardi, Simona Caparrini, Ornella Muti, Antonio Albanese, Riccardo Scamarcio, Roberto Della Casa, Giuliano Gemma, Lino Guanciale, Flavio Parenti, Alessandro Tiberi, Monica Nappo, Cecilia Capriotti, Marta Zoffoli, Cristiana Palazzoni	
J U N E	27	Beasts of the Southern Wild	Fox Searchlight Pictures	Benh Zeitlin (director/screenplay); Lucy Alibar (screenplay); Quvenzhané Wallis, Dwight Henry	
J U N E	29	Madea's Witness Protection	Lionsgate / Tyler Perry Studios	Tyler Perry (director/screenplay); Tyler Perry, Eugene Levy, Doris Roberts, Tom Arnold, Denise Richards, Danielle Campbell, Romeo, John Amos, Marla Gibbs, Charlie Sheen	
J U N E	29	Magic Mike	Warner Bros. Pictures	Steven Soderbergh (director); Reid Carolin (screenplay); Channing Tatum, Alex Pettyfer, Matthew McConaughey, Matt Bomer, Riley Keough, Cody Horn, Joe Manganiello, Olivia Munn, Adam Rodriguez, Kevin Nash, Gabriel Iglesias, Mircea Monroe, Camryn Grimes, Wendi McLendon-Covey, Martin Villeneuve, Michael Roark, Betsy Brandt	
J U N E	29	Ted	Universal Pictures / Media Rights Capital / Bluegrass Films / Fuzzy Door Productions	Seth MacFarlane (director/screenplay); Alec Sulkin, Wellesley Wild (screenplay); Mark Wahlberg, Mila Kunis, Seth MacFarlane, Giovanni Ribisi, Joel McHale, Patrick Warburton, Jessica Stroup, Laura Vandervoort, Aedin Mincks, Matt Walsh, Jessica Barth, Bill Smitrovich, Alex Borstein, Ralph Garman, Sam J. Jones, Ryan Reynolds, Norah Jones, Tom Skerritt, Mike Henry, Robert Wu, Ted Danson, Patrick Stewart, Tara Strong	
J U N E	29	People Like Us	Touchstone Pictures / DreamWorks Pictures / Reliance Entertainment / K/O Paper Products	Alex Kurtzman (director/screenplay); Roberto Orci, Jody Lambert (screenplay); Chris Pine, Elizabeth Banks, Michelle Pfeiffer, Olivia Wilde, Mark Duplass, Jon Favreau, Michael Hall D'Addario, Philip Baker Hall	

== July–September ==
Opening		Title	Production Company	Cast and crew	Ref.
J U L Y	3	The Amazing Spider-Man	Columbia Pictures / Marvel Entertainment	Marc Webb (director); James Vanderbilt, Alvin Sargent, Steve Kloves (screenplay); Andrew Garfield, Emma Stone, Max Charles, Martin Sheen, Sally Field, Campbell Scott, Rhys Ifans, Chris Zylka, Denis Leary, Irrfan Khan, Embeth Davidtz, Hannah Marks, Kelsey Chow, C. Thomas Howell, Stan Lee, Michael Massee, Michael Papajohn, Skyler Gisondo, Kari Coleman, Leif Gantvoort, Michael Barra, Tom Waite, Charlie DePew, Jacob Rodier	
J U L Y	5	Katy Perry: Part of Me 3D	Paramount Pictures / Insurge Pictures / MTV Films / Imagine Entertainment / Perry Productions	Dan Cutforth, Jane Lipsetz (directors); Katy Perry	
J U L Y	6	Savages	Universal Pictures / Relativity Media	Oliver Stone (director/screenplay); Don Winslow, Shane Salerno (screenplay); Taylor Kitsch, Blake Lively, Aaron Johnson, John Travolta, Benicio del Toro, Salma Hayek, Emile Hirsch, Demián Bichir, Sandra Echeverría, Joaquín Cosío, Mía Maestro, Shea Whigham, Joel David Moore, Leonard Roberts, Trevor Donovan, Ralph Echemendia, Jake McLaughlin, Sean Stone, Ali Wong	
J U L Y	6	Collaborator	Tribeca Film	Martin Donovan (director/screenplay); Martin Donovan, David Morse, Olivia Williams, Katherine Helmond	
J U L Y	13	Ice Age: Continental Drift	20th Century Fox / Blue Sky Studios	Steve Martino, Mike Thurmeier (directors); Michael Berg, Jason Fuchs (screenplay); Ray Romano, John Leguizamo, Denis Leary, Nicki Minaj, Drake, Jennifer Lopez, Queen Latifah, Seann William Scott, Josh Peck, Chris Wedge, Peter Dinklage, Wanda Sykes, Josh Gad, Keke Palmer, Nick Frost, Aziz Ansari, Ben Gleib, Alan Tudyk, Ester Dean, Kunal Nayyar, Rebel Wilson, Eddie "Piolín" Sotelo, Joy Behar, Alain Chabat, Heather Morris, Karen Disher, Patrick Stewart, Simon Pegg, Edita Brychta, Aimée Castle, Jim Conroy, Daniel Flaherty, Marieve Herington, Jason Harris, Selenis Leyva, Bill Lobley, Chris Phillips, Tara Sands, Keith Silverstein, Randall Thom, Corwin Tuggles, Tashiana Washington	
J U L Y	13	The Imposter	The Indomina Group	Bart Layton (director); Frédéric Bourdin	
J U L Y	20	The Dark Knight Rises	Warner Bros. Pictures / Legendary Pictures / DC Entertainment / Syncopy Inc.	Christopher Nolan (director/screenplay); Jonathan Nolan (screenplay); Christian Bale, Michael Caine, Gary Oldman, Anne Hathaway, Tom Hardy, Marion Cotillard, Joseph Gordon-Levitt, Morgan Freeman, Matthew Modine, Ben Mendelsohn, Burn Gorman, Alon Abutbul, Juno Temple, Daniel Sunjata, Chris Ellis, Brett Cullen, Liam Neeson, Cillian Murphy, John Nolan, Josh Pence, Nestor Carbonell, Aidan Gillen, Rob Brown, Desmond Harrington, Josh Stewart, Christopher Judge, Noel Gugliemi, Tom Conti, William Devane, Ben Roethlisberger, Hines Ward, Troy Polamalu, Willie Colon, Maurkice Pouncey, Mike Wallace, Heath Miller, Aaron Smith, Ryan Clark, James Farrior, LaMarr Woodley, Casey Hampton, Bill Cowher, Luke Ravenstahl, United States Senator Patrick Leahy, Thomas Lennon, India Wadsworth, Aliash Tepina, Reggie Lee, Duane Henry, James Harvey Ward, Trevor White, Fredric Lehne, Jay Benedict, Will Estes, David Dayan Fisher, Glen Powell, Brent Briscoe, Oliver Cotton, Mark Killeen, Sarah Goldberg, John Macmillan, Robert Ray Wisdom, Ronnie Gene Blevins, John Hollingworth, Ian Bohen, Uri Gavriel, Aramis Knight, Joey King, David Gyasi, Joshua Elijah Reese, Tomas Arana, Peter Holden, David Monahan, Jillian Armenante, Wade Williams, Jake Canuso, Daniel Newman, Massi Furlan, Warren Brown, Michael Papajohn	
J U L Y	20	The Queen of Versailles	Magnolia Pictures	Lauren Greenfield (director); David A. Siegel, Jackie Siegel	
J U L Y	25	Ruby Sparks	Fox Searchlight Pictures	Jonathan Dayton, Valerie Faris (directors); Zoe Kazan (screenplay); Paul Dano, Zoe Kazan, Annette Bening, Antonio Banderas, Steve Coogan, Elliott Gould, Chris Messina, Deborah Ann Woll, Aasif Mandvi, Toni Trucks, Alia Shawkat, Wallace Langham, Michael Berry Jr.	
J U L Y	27	Step Up Revolution	Summit Entertainment	Scott Speer (director); Amanda Brody (screenplay); Ryan Guzman, Kathryn McCormick, Misha Gabriel, Peter Gallagher, Stephen "tWitch" Boss, Tommy Dewey, Cleopatra Coleman, Megan Boone, Adam Sevani, Chadd "Madd Chadd" Smith, Celestina Aladekoba, Natali Reznick, Mia Michaels	
J U L Y	27	The Watch	20th Century Fox / Dune Entertainment / 21 Laps Entertainment	Akiva Schaffer (director); Jared Stern, Seth Rogen, Evan Goldberg (screenplay); Ben Stiller, Vince Vaughn, Rosemarie DeWitt, Jonah Hill, Richard Ayoade, Will Forte, Billy Crudup, Erin Moriarty, Nicholas Braun, Mel Rodriguez, Doug Jones, R. Lee Ermey, Akiva Schaffer, Andy Samberg, Jorma Taccone, Patricia French, Joseph A. Nunez	
J U L Y	27	Ai Weiwei: Never Sorry	Sundance Selects	Alison Klayman (director/screenplay); Danqing Chen, Ying Gao, Changwei Gu	
J U L Y	27	Killer Joe	LD Distribution	William Friedkin (director); Tracy Letts (screenplay); Matthew McConaughey, Emile Hirsch, Juno Temple, Thomas Haden Church, Gina Gershon, Marc Macaulay	
J U L Y	27	Searching for Sugar Man	Sony Pictures Classics	Malik Bendjelloul (director); Rodriguez	
A U G U S T	3	Diary of a Wimpy Kid: Dog Days	20th Century Fox / Fox 2000 Pictures	David Bowers (director); Maya Forbes, Wallace Wolodarsky (screenplay); Zachary Gordon, Robert Capron, Rachael Harris, Devon Bostick, Steve Zahn, Peyton List, Grayson Russell, Karan Brar, Laine MacNeil, Melissa Roxburgh, Connor & Owen Fielding, Alfred E. Humphreys, Terence Kelly, Tom Stevens, Andrew McNee, Dalila Bela, Elise Gatien, Frank C. Turner, Jeff Kinney, Bryce Hodgson, Brownen Smith, Philip Maurice Hayes, Latonya Williams, Nicole Fraissinet, John Shaw, Doug Abrahams, Amitai Marmorstein	
A U G U S T	3	Total Recall	Columbia Pictures / Relativity Media / Original Film	Len Wiseman (director); Kurt Wimmer, Mark Bomback (screenplay); Colin Farrell, Kate Beckinsale, Jessica Biel, Bryan Cranston, Bill Nighy, John Cho, Ethan Hawke, Bokeem Woodbine, Will Yun Lee, Dylan Smith	
A U G U S T	3	Celeste and Jesse Forever	Sony Pictures Classics	Lee Toland Krieger (director); Rashida Jones, Will McCormack (screenplay); Rashida Jones, Andy Samberg, Elijah Wood, Ari Graynor, Will McCormack, Emma Roberts, Eric Christian Olsen, Chris Messina, Rich Sommer, Chris D'Elia, Rafi Gavron, Matthew Del Negro, Kris Pino, Janel Parrish, Rebecca Dayan	
A U G U S T	8	Hope Springs	Columbia Pictures / Mandate Pictures / Escape Artists / Metro-Goldwyn-Mayer	David Frankel (director); Vanessa Taylor (screenplay); Meryl Streep, Tommy Lee Jones, Steve Carell, Mimi Rogers, Elisabeth Shue, Jean Smart, Brett Rice, Damian Young, Ben Rappaport, Marin Ireland, Becky Ann Baker	
A U G U S T	10	The Bourne Legacy	Universal Pictures / Relativity Media / The Kennedy/Marshall Company	Tony Gilroy (director/screenplay); Dan Gilroy (screenplay); Jeremy Renner, Rachel Weisz, Edward Norton, Oscar Isaac, Joan Allen, Albert Finney, Stacy Keach, Scott Glenn, David Strathairn, Donna Murphy, Elizabeth Marvel, Željko Ivanek, Corey Stoll, Michael Papajohn, Dennis Boutsikaris, Michael Chernus, Shane Jacobson, John Douglas Thompson, Louis Ozawa Changchien, David Wilson Barnes, Neil Brooks Cunningham, Corey Johnson, Michael Berresse, John Arcilla, Lou Veloso, Karen Pittman	
A U G U S T	10	The Campaign	Warner Bros. Pictures / Gary Sanchez Productions	Jay Roach (director); Chris Henchy, Shawn Harwell (screenplay); Will Ferrell, Zach Galifianakis, Jason Sudeikis, Katherine LaNasa, Dylan McDermott, John Lithgow, Dan Aykroyd, Brian Cox, P.J. Byrne, Sarah Baker, Madison Wolfe, Billy Slaughter, Taryn Terrell, Karen Maruyama, Josh Lawson, Thomas Middleditch, Steve Tom, John Goodman, The Miz	
A U G U S T	15	The Odd Life of Timothy Green	Walt Disney Pictures	Peter Hedges (director/screenplay); Jennifer Garner, Joel Edgerton, CJ Adams, Ron Livingston, Dianne Wiest, Odeya Rush, Rosemarie DeWitt, Lin-Manuel Miranda, M. Emmet Walsh, Lois Smith, Common, David Morse, Shohreh Aghdashloo, Tim Guinee, James Rebhorn, Michael Arden, Rhoda Griffis	
A U G U S T	17	The Expendables 2	Lionsgate / Millennium Films / Nu Image	Simon West (director), Sylvester Stallone, Richard Wenk (screenplay); Sylvester Stallone, Jason Statham, Jet Li, Dolph Lundgren, Chuck Norris, Jean-Claude Van Damme, Bruce Willis, Arnold Schwarzenegger, Terry Crews, Randy Couture, Liam Hemsworth, Scott Adkins, Yu Nan, Charisma Carpenter, Amanda Ooms, Nikolette Noel, Lyubomir Simeonov,	
A U G U S T	17	ParaNorman	Focus Features / Laika	Chris Butler (director/screenplay); Sam Fell (director); Kodi Smit-McPhee, Tucker Albrizzi, Anna Kendrick, Casey Affleck, Christopher Mintz-Plasse, Leslie Mann, Jeff Garlin, Elaine Stritch, Bernard Hill, John Goodman, Jodelle Ferland, Tempestt Bledsoe, Alex Borstein, Jack Blessing, Michael Corbett, Nicholas Guest, Emily Hahn, Bridget Hoffman, Alicia Lagano, Scott Menville, Ariel Winter, Jeremy Shada, Kirk Baily, Jacob Bertrand, Cam Clarke, Lara Cody, Denise Faye, Eddie Frierson, Rif Hutton, Edie Mirman	
A U G U S T	17	Sparkle	TriStar Pictures / Stage 6 Films	Salim Akil (director); Mara Brock Akil (screenplay); Jordin Sparks, Whitney Houston, Derek Luke, Mike Epps, Carmen Ejogo, Tika Sumpter, Omari Hardwick, CeeLo Green, Curtis Armstrong, Terrence J, Tamela Mann, Michael Beach, Brely Evans, Kem L. Owens, Goapele, Fatima Robinson	
A U G U S T	17	Compliance	Magnolia Pictures	Craig Zobel (director/screenplay); Ann Dowd, Dreama Walker, Pat Healy, Bill Camp, Ashlie Atkinson, Phillip Ettinger	
A U G U S T	17	Cosmopolis	Entertainment One	David Cronenberg (director/screenplay); Robert Pattinson, Juliette Binoche, Sarah Gadon, Mathieu Amalric, Jay Baruchel, Kevin Durand, K'naan, Emily Hampshire, Samantha Morton, Paul Giamatti, Bob Bainborough, Philip Nozuka, Patricia McKenzie, Abdul Ayoola, Zeljko Kecojevic	
A U G U S T	17	Robot & Frank	Samuel Goldwyn Films	Jake Schreier (director); Christopher Ford (screenplay); Frank Langella, Susan Sarandon, James Marsden, Liv Tyler, Peter Sarsgaard, Jeremy Sisto, Jeremy Strong, Katherine Waterston, Ana Gasteyer	
A U G U S T	21	Community Service: The Movie	Rusty Nail Productions	Joseph Patrick Kelly (director/screenplay)	
A U G U S T	22	Hit and Run	Open Road Films	Dax Shepard (director/screenplay); David Palmer (director); Dax Shepard, Kristen Bell, Bradley Cooper, Tom Arnold, Kristin Chenoweth, Beau Bridges, David Koechner, Joy Bryant, Ryan Hansen, Jason Bateman, Sean Hayes, Michael Rosenbaum	
A U G U S T	24	The Apparition	Warner Bros. Pictures / Dark Castle Entertainment / Studio Babelsberg	Todd Lincoln (director/screenplay); Ashley Greene, Sebastian Stan, Tom Felton, Julianna Guill, Rick Gomez, Luke Pasqualino, Tim Williams, Anna Clark, Marti Matulis, John Grady, Suzanne Ford	
A U G U S T	24	It's Such a Beautiful Day	Cinemad Presents	Don Hertzfeldt (director/screenplay)	
A U G U S T	24	Premium Rush	Columbia Pictures	David Koepp (director/screenplay); John Kamps (screenplay); Joseph Gordon-Levitt, Michael Shannon, Dania Ramirez, Wolé Parks, Jamie Chung, Aasif Mandvi, Ashley Austin Morris, Henry O, Brian Koppelman, Anthony Chisholm, Lauren Ashley Carter, Aaron Tveit, Wai Ching Ho, Christopher Place, Boyce Wong, Kevin Bolger, BoJun Wang, Sean Kennedy, Kym Perfetto, Darlene Violette, Mario D'Leon, Djani Johnson	
A U G U S T	29	Lawless	The Weinstein Company / Benaroya Pictures / Red Wagon Entertainment / Annapurna Pictures	John Hillcoat (director); Nick Cave (screenplay); Shia LaBeouf, Tom Hardy, Jason Clarke, Guy Pearce, Gary Oldman, Mia Wasikowska, Jessica Chastain, Dane DeHaan, Chris McGarry, Lew Temple, Bill Camp, Noah Taylor, Tim Tolin, Marcus Hester, Alex Van	
A U G U S T	29	The Oogieloves in the Big Balloon Adventure	Romar 41	Matthew Diamond (director); Scott Stabile (screenplay); Toni Braxton, Cloris Leachman, Christopher Lloyd, Chazz Palminteri, Cary Elwes, Jaime Pressly	
A U G U S T	31	The Possession	Lionsgate / Ghost House Pictures	Ole Bornedal (director); Juliet Snowden, Stiles White (screenplay); Jeffrey Dean Morgan, Kyra Sedgwick, Madison Davenport, Natasha Calis, Grant Show, Matisyahu, Jay Brazeau, Quinn Lord	
A U G U S T	31	For a Good Time, Call...	Focus Features	Jamie Travis (director); Katie Anne Naylon, Lauren Anne Miller (screenplay); Ari Graynor, Seth Rogen, Lauren Anne Miller, Justin Long, Mark Webber, James Wolk, Sugar Lyn Beard, Mimi Rogers, Don McManus, Nia Vardalos, Kevin Smith, Martha MacIsaac, Ken Marino	
S E P T E M B E R	7	The Cold Light of Day	Summit Entertainment / Intrepid Pictures	Mabrouk El Mechri (director); John Petro, Scott Wiper (screenplay); Henry Cavill, Bruce Willis, Sigourney Weaver, Verónica Echegui, Roschdy Zem, Óscar Jaenada, Joseph Mawle, Caroline Goodall, Rafi Gavron, Emma Hamilton, Michael Budd, Jim Piddock, Paloma Bloyd, Colm Meaney, Lolo Herrero, Mark Ullod, Alex Amaral	
S E P T E M B E R	7	The Words	CBS Films	Brian Klugman, Lee Sternthal (directors/screenplay); Bradley Cooper, Jeremy Irons, Zoe Saldaña, Dennis Quaid, Olivia Wilde, Ben Barnes, J.K. Simmons, John Hannah, Nora Arnezeder, Željko Ivanek, Michael McKean, Ron Rifkin, Brian Klugman, Liz Stauber, Lee Sternthal	
S E P T E M B E R	7	Raiders of the Lost Ark: The IMAX Experience	Paramount Pictures / Lucasfilm	Steven Spielberg (director); Lawrence Kasdan (screenplay); Harrison Ford, John Rhys-Davies, Karen Allen, Paul Freeman, Alfred Molina, Denholm Elliott, Ronald Lacey, Wolf Kahler, Anthony Higgins, Vic Tablian, Don Fellows, Fred Sorenson, William Hootkins, George Harris, Frank Marshall, Pat Roach, Terry Richards	
S E P T E M B E R	7	Anna Karenina	Focus Features	Joe Wright (director); Tom Stoppard (screenplay); Keira Knightley, Jude Law, Aaron Johnson, Kelly Macdonald, Matthew Macfadyen, Olivia Williams, Emily Watson, Alicia Vikander, Ruth Wilson, Domhnall Gleeson, Michelle Dockery, Raphaël Personnaz, David Wilmot, Emerald Fennell, Tannishtha Chatterjee, Pip Torrens, Susanne Lothar, Alexandra Roach, Holliday Grainger, Cara Delevingne, Bill Skarsgård, Shirley Henderson, Steve Evets, John Bradley, Vicky McClure	
S E P T E M B E R	7	Detropia	Roco Films / ITVS	Heidi Ewing, Rachel Grady (directors)	
S E P T E M B E R	14	Resident Evil: Retribution	Screen Gems / Davis Films / Impact Pictures / Constantin Film	Paul W. S. Anderson (director/screenplay); Milla Jovovich, Sienna Guillory, Colin Salmon, Boris Kodjoe, Michelle Rodriguez, Shawn Roberts, Johann Urb, Kevin Durand, Li Bingbing, Oded Fehr, Aryana Engineer, Mika Nakashima, Megan Charpentier	
S E P T E M B E R	14	Finding Nemo 3D	Walt Disney Pictures / Pixar Animation Studios	Andrew Stanton (director/screenplay); Lee Unkrich (director); Bob Peterson, David Reynolds (screenplay); Alexander Gould, Albert Brooks, Ellen DeGeneres, Willem Dafoe, Barry Humphries, Eric Bana, Bruce Spence, Allison Janney, Elizabeth Perkins, Geoffrey Rush, Brad Garrett, Austin Pendleton, Stephen Root, Vicki Lewis, Joe Ranft, Bill Hunter, Andrew Stanton, Nicholas Bird, Bob Peterson, Erik Per Sullivan, John Ratzenberger, Carlos Alazraqui, Jack Angel, Bob Bergen, Susan Blu, Jane Carr, Jennifer Darling, Paul Eiding, Jessie Flower, Bradley Trevor Greive, Jess Harnell, Sherry Lynn, Danny Mann, Mickie McGowan, Marc John Jefferies, Laura Marano, Vanessa Marano, Laraine Newman, Jeff Pidgeon, Phil Proctor, Jan Rabson, Daryl Sabara, Eve Sabara, David Ian Salter, Eliza Schneider, Lee Unkrich, James Kevin Ward, Kali Whitehurst	
S E P T E M B E R	14	Arbitrage	Lionsgate / Roadside Attractions	Nicholas Jarecki (director/screenplay); Richard Gere, Susan Sarandon, Tim Roth, Brit Marling, Laetitia Casta, Nate Parker, Stuart Margolin, Chris Eigeman, Graydon Carter, Bruce Altman	
S E P T E M B E R	14	The Master	The Weinstein Company / Annapurna Pictures	Paul Thomas Anderson (director/screenplay); Joaquin Phoenix, Philip Seymour Hoffman, Amy Adams, Laura Dern, Ambyr Childers, Rami Malek, Jesse Plemons, Kevin J. O'Connor, Christopher Evan Welch, Madisen Beaty, Lena Endre, Amy Ferguson, Patty McCormack, Jillian Bell, Joshua Close, Fiona Dourif, David Warshofsky, Steven Wiig, W. Earl Brown	
S E P T E M B E R	14	Stolen	Millennium Films	Simon West (director); David Guggenheim (screenplay); Nicolas Cage, Malin Åkerman, Josh Lucas, Danny Huston	
S E P T E M B E R	21	Dredd	Lionsgate / Reliance Entertainment	Pete Travis (director); Alex Garland (screenplay); Karl Urban, Olivia Thirlby, Lena Headey, Wood Harris, Domhnall Gleeson, DeObia Oparei, Francis Chouler, Rakie Ayola, Langley Kirkwood, Jason Cope, Warrick Grier, Daniel Hadebe	
S E P T E M B E R	21	Dungeons & Dragons 3: The Book of Vile Darkness	Syfy / Hasbro Entertainment		
S E P T E M B E R	21	End of Watch	Open Road Films / Exclusive Media / Emmett/Furla Films	David Ayer (director/screenplay); Jake Gyllenhaal, Michael Peña, Anna Kendrick, Natalie Martinez, America Ferrera, Frank Grillo, Cody Horn, David Harbour, Kristy Wu, Cle Shaheed Sloan, Shondrella Avery, Maurice Compte, Flakiss, Richard Cabral, Jaime Fitzsimons, Diamonique	
S E P T E M B E R	21	House at the End of the Street	Relativity Media / Rogue Pictures / FilmNation Entertainment / A Bigger Boat	Mark Tonderai (director); David Loucka (screenplay); Jennifer Lawrence, Elisabeth Shue, Max Thieriot, Gil Bellows, Nolan Gerard Funk, Allie MacDonald, Jordan Hayes, Eva Link, Grace Tucker-Duguay, Krista Bridges, John Healy, Bobby Osborne	
S E P T E M B E R	21	Trouble with the Curve	Warner Bros. Pictures	Robert Lorenz (director); Randy Brown (screenplay); Clint Eastwood, Amy Adams, Matthew Lillard, Justin Timberlake, John Goodman, Robert Patrick, Scott Eastwood, Matt Bush, Jack Gilpin, Ed Lauter, Chelcie Ross, George Wyner, Bob Gunton, Tom Dreesen, Raymond Anthony Thomas, James Patrick Freetly, Joe Massingill, Jay Galloway, Sammy Blue	
S E P T E M B E R	21	Head Games	Variance Films	Steve James (director); Christopher Nowinski, Bob Costas, Keith Primeau	
S E P T E M B E R	21	The Perks of Being a Wallflower	Summit Entertainment	Stephen Chbosky (director/screenplay); Emma Watson, Logan Lerman, Mae Whitman, Nina Dobrev, Johnny Simmons, Dylan McDermott, Paul Rudd, Ezra Miller, Kate Walsh, Erin Wilhelmi, Adam Hagenbuch, Melanie Lynskey, Joan Cusack, Zane Holtz, Reece Thompson, Nicholas Braun, Landon Pigg, Tom Savini, Julia Garner	
S E P T E M B E R	27	Magical Mystery Tour	Omniverse Vision / Apple Corps / BBC	Bernard Knowles, The Beatles (directors); The Beatles (screenplay); John, Paul, George, and Ringo, Jessie Robins, Vivian Stanshall, Victor Spinetti, Mal Evans, Ivor Cutler, Derek Royle	
S E P T E M B E R	28	Hotel Transylvania	Columbia Pictures / Sony Pictures Animation	Genndy Tartakovsky (director); Don Rhymer (screenplay); Adam Sandler, Andy Samberg, Selena Gomez, Kevin James, Fran Drescher, Steve Buscemi, Molly Shannon, David Spade, CeeLo Green, Jon Lovitz, Luenell, Chris Parnell, Brian George, Brian Stack, Jackie Sandler, Sadie Sandler, Robert Smigel, Rob Riggle, Paul Brittain, Jim Wise, Brian McCann, Rose Abdoo, Kirk Baily, Dana L. Belben, Corey Burton, Cam Clarke, Michael Corbett, Allen Covert, Doug Dale, Collin Dean, Eddie Frierson, Bridget Hoffman, Rif Hutton, Tom Kenny, Scott Menville, Edie Mirman, Sunny Sandler, Katie Silverman, Sarah Thyre, Maddie Taylor	
S E P T E M B E R	28	Looper	TriStar Pictures / FilmDistrict	Rian Johnson (director/screenplay); Joseph Gordon-Levitt, Bruce Willis, Emily Blunt, Paul Dano, Noah Segan, Jeff Daniels, Piper Perabo, Pierce Gagnon, Summer Qing, Tracie Thoms, Garret Dillahunt, Nick Gomez	
S E P T E M B E R	28	Won't Back Down	20th Century Fox / Walden Media	Daniel Barnz (director/screenplay); Brin Hill (screenplay); Viola Davis, Maggie Gyllenhaal, Holly Hunter, Ving Rhames, Rosie Perez, Oscar Isaac, Lance Reddick, Marianne Jean-Baptiste, Bill Nunn, Emily Alyn Lind, Dante Brown, Liza Colón-Zayas, Ned Eisenberg	
S E P T E M B E R	28	The Waiting Room	International Film Circuit	Peter Nicks (director);	

== October–December ==
Opening		Title	Production Company	Cast and crew	Ref.
O C T O B E R	5	Frankenweenie	Walt Disney Pictures	Tim Burton (director); John August (screenplay); Catherine O'Hara, Martin Short, Martin Landau, Charlie Tahan, Atticus Shaffer, Winona Ryder, Robert Capron, James Hiroyuki Liao, Conchata Ferrell, Michael Welch, Christopher Lee, Tom Kenny, Dee Bradley Baker, Jeff Bennett, Frank Welker, Melissa Stribling, Jon Donahue	
O C T O B E R	5	Pitch Perfect	Universal Pictures / Gold Circle Films	Jason Moore (director); Kay Cannon, Jeff Roda (screenplay); Anna Kendrick, Anna Camp, Rebel Wilson, Adam DeVine, Alexis Knapp, Brittany Snow, Freddie Stroma, Skylar Astin, Ester Dean, Hana Mae Lee, Ben Platt, Utkarsh Ambudkar, John Michael Higgins, Elizabeth Banks, Kelley Alice Jakle, Shelley Regner, David Del Rio, John Benjamin Hickey, Joe Lo Truglio, Har Mar Superstar, Jason Jones, Donald Faison, Christopher Mintz-Plasse	
O C T O B E R	5	The Oranges	ATO Pictures	Julian Farino (director); Ian Helfer, Jay Reiss (screenplay); Hugh Laurie, Leighton Meester, Catherine Keener, Adam Brody, Alia Shawkat, Oliver Platt, Allison Janney	
O C T O B E R	5	The Paperboy	Millennium Films	Lee Daniels (director/screenplay); Zac Efron, Matthew McConaughey, Nicole Kidman, John Cusack, David Oyelowo, Scott Glenn, Macy Gray, Ned Bellamy, Nealla Gordon	
O C T O B E R	12	Argo	Warner Bros. Pictures / GK Films	Ben Affleck (director); Chris Terrio (screenplay); Ben Affleck, John Goodman, Alan Arkin, Bryan Cranston, Victor Garber, Tate Donovan, Clea DuVall, Christopher Denham, Scoot McNairy, Kerry Bishé, Rory Cochrane, Kyle Chandler, Chris Messina, Željko Ivanek, Titus Welliver, Bob Gunton, Richard Kind, Richard Dillane, Omid Abtahi, Sheila Vand, Keith Szarabajka, Michael Parks, Taylor Schilling, Barry Livingston, Adrienne Barbeau, Tom Lenk, Nelson Franklin, Mark Rhino Smith, Philip Baker Hall, Mike Wallace	
O C T O B E R	12	Here Comes the Boom	Columbia Pictures	Frank Coraci (director); Allan Loeb, Kevin James (screenplay); Kevin James, Salma Hayek, Henry Winkler, Joe Rogan, Greg Germann, Gary Valentine, Jake Zyrus, Bas Rutten, Nikki Tyler-Flynn, Reggie Lee, Jason Miller, Mark Muñoz, Melissa Peterman, Shelly Desai, Bruce Buffer, Krzysztof Soszynski, Satoshi Ishii, Mark DellaGrotte, Herb Dean, Arianny Celeste, Mookie Barker, Mike Goldberg, Wanderlei Silva, Chael Sonnen, Jacob "Stitch" Duran, Melchor Menor, Lenny Clarke	
O C T O B E R	12	Seven Psychopaths	CBS Films	Martin McDonagh (director/screenplay); Colin Farrell, Sam Rockwell, Woody Harrelson, Christopher Walken, Tom Waits, Abbie Cornish, Olga Kurylenko, Željko Ivanek, Harry Dean Stanton, Brendan Sexton III, Amanda Warren, Christine Marzano, Kevin Corrigan, Gabourey Sidibe, Michael Pitt, Michael Stuhlbarg, Helena Mattsson, Long Nguyen, Linda Bright Clay	
O C T O B E R	12	Sinister	Summit Entertainment / Alliance Films / BH Productions	Scott Derrickson (director/screenplay); C. Robert Cargill (screenplay); Ethan Hawke, Juliet Rylance, Fred Dalton Thompson, Vincent D'Onofrio, James Ransone, Clare Foley, Cameron Ocasio, Michael Hall D'Addario, Nick King	
O C T O B E R	12	3,2,1... Frankie Go Boom	Variance Films	Jordan Roberts (director/screenplay); Charlie Hunnam, Chris O'Dowd, Lizzy Caplan, Nora Dunn, Whitney Cummings, Ron Perlman, Chris Noth	
O C T O B E R	12	Nobody Walks	Magnolia Pictures	Ry Russo-Young (director/screenplay), Lena Dunham (screenplay); John Krasinski, Olivia Thirlby, Rosemarie DeWitt, India Ennenga, Justin Kirk	
O C T O B E R	12	Smashed	Sony Pictures Classics	James Ponsoldt (director/screenplay); Susan Burke (screenplay); Mary Elizabeth Winstead, Aaron Paul, Octavia Spencer, Nick Offerman, Megan Mullally, Mary Kay Place, Kyle Gallner, Bree Turner, Mackenzie Davis, Richmond Arquette, Natalie Dreyfuss, Brad Carter	
O C T O B E R	12	Smiley	Fever Productions LLC / MIJ Productions	Michael Gallagher (director/screenplay); Glasgow Phillips (screenplay); Caitlin Gerard, Melanie Papalia, Andrew James Allen, Liza Weil, Toby Turner, Roger Bart, Keith David, Jason Horton, Shane Dawson	
O C T O B E R	19	Alex Cross	Summit Entertainment	Rob Cohen (director); James Patterson, Kerry Williamson, Marc Moss (screenplay); Tyler Perry, Matthew Fox, Rachel Nichols, Edward Burns, Jean Reno, Giancarlo Esposito, Carmen Ejogo, Cicely Tyson, John C. McGinley, Werner Daehn, Yara Shahidi, Sayeed Shahidi, Stephanie Jacobsen, Ingo Rademacher, Bonnie Bentley, Simenona Martinez	
O C T O B E R	19	Paranormal Activity 4	Paramount Pictures	Ariel Schulman, Henry Joost (directors); Zack Estrin (screenplay); Kathryn Newton, Matt Shively, Stephen Dunham, Alexondra Lee, Katie Featherston, Alisha Boe, Frank Welker, Aiden Lovekamp, Brady Allen	
O C T O B E R	19	The Sessions	Fox Searchlight Pictures	Ben Lewin (director/screenplay); John Hawkes, Helen Hunt, William H. Macy, Moon Bloodgood, Annika Marks, Adam Arkin, Rhea Perlman, W. Earl Brown, Robin Weigert, Blake Lindsley, Rusty Schwimmer	
O C T O B E R	26	Chasing Mavericks	20th Century Fox / Walden Media	Curtis Hanson, Michael Apted (directors); Kario Salem (screenplay); Gerard Butler, Jonny Weston, Elisabeth Shue, Abigail Spencer, Leven Rambin, Greg Long, Peter Mel, Taylor Handley, Harley Graham, Scott Eastwood	
O C T O B E R	26	Cloud Atlas	Warner Bros. Pictures	Tom Tykwer, Lilly Wachowski, Lana Wachowski (directors/screenplay); Tom Hanks, Jim Sturgess, David Gyasi, Jim Broadbent, Ben Whishaw, Halle Berry, Hugh Grant, Doona Bae, Hugo Weaving, Susan Sarandon, Keith David, James D'Arcy, Zhou Xun, Robert Fyfe, Martin Wuttke, Andrew Havill, Alistair Petrie, Sylvestra Le Touzel, Brody Nicholas Lee, David Mitchell	
O C T O B E R	26	Fun Size	Paramount Pictures / Nickelodeon Movies	Josh Schwartz (director); Max Werner (screenplay); Victoria Justice, Jane Levy, Thomas McDonell, Thomas Mann, Chelsea Handler, Thomas Middleditch, Jackson Nicoll, Osric Chau, Riki Lindhome, Johnny Knoxville, Josh Pence, Ana Gasteyer, Kerri Kenney-Silver, Holmes Osborne, Peter "Navy" Tuiasosopo, Willam Belli, Abby Elliott, Patrick de Ledebur, James Pumphrey, Annie Fitzpatrick	
N O V E M B E R	2	Flight	Paramount Pictures / P+M Image Nation / ImageMovers	Robert Zemeckis (director); John Gatins (screenplay); Denzel Washington, Don Cheadle, Kelly Reilly, John Goodman, Bruce Greenwood, Melissa Leo, Tamara Tunie, Nadine Velazquez, Brian Geraghty, Peter Gerety, Garcelle Beauvais, James Badge Dale, Piers Morgan, E. Roger Mitchell, Randy Thom, Hal Williams, Kwesi Boakye	
N O V E M B E R	2	The Man with the Iron Fists	Universal Pictures	RZA (director/screenplay); Eli Roth (screenplay); Russell Crowe, Lucy Liu, Dave Bautista, RZA, Byron Mann, Cung Le, Rick Yune, Jamie Chung, Pam Grier, Osric Chau, MC Jin, Daniel Wu, Andrew Lin, Grace Huang, Eli Roth, Chen Kuan-tai, Bryan Leung, Zhu Zhu, Terence Yin, Gordon Liu, Telly Liu, Xue Jing Yao	
N O V E M B E R	2	Wreck-It Ralph	Walt Disney Pictures / Walt Disney Animation Studios	Rich Moore (director); Jennifer Lee, Phil Johnston (screenplay); John C. Reilly, Sarah Silverman, Jack McBrayer, Jane Lynch, Alan Tudyk, Mindy Kaling, Joe Lo Truglio, Ed O'Neill, Dennis Haysbert, Adam Carolla, Horatio Sanz, Rich Moore, Edie McClurg, Raymond S. Persi, Jess Harnell, Rachael Harris, Skylar Astin, Katie Lowes, Jamie Elman, Phil Johnston, Stefanie Scott, John DiMaggio, Brian Kesinger, Martin Jarvis, Brandon Scott, Maurice LaMarche, Roger Craig Smith, Reuben Langdon, Kyle Hebert, Ava Acres, Isabella Acres, Bob Bergen, David Boat, Jim Cummings, E.G. Daily, Debi Derryberry, Sandy Fox, Eddie Frierson, Emily Hahn, Jennifer Hale, Lauren MacMullan, Mona Marshall, Scott Menville, Laraine Newman, Paul Pape, Kath Soucie, April Stewart, Fred Tatasciore, Nick Grimshaw	
N O V E M B E R	2	The Bay	Lionsgate / Roadside Attractions / Alliance Films	Barry Levinson (director); Michael Wallach (screenplay); Will Rogers, Kristen Connolly, Kether Donohue, Frank Deal, Stephen Nunken, Christopher Denham, Nansi Aluka	
N O V E M B E R	2	The Details	The Weinstein Company	Jacob Aaron Estes (director/screenplay); Tobey Maguire, Elizabeth Banks, Dennis Haysbert, Ray Liotta, Kerry Washington, Laura Linney, Jonah Hill	
N O V E M B E R	2	A Late Quartet	Entertainment One	Yaron Zilberman (director/screenplay); Seth Grossman (screenplay); Philip Seymour Hoffman, Catherine Keener, Christopher Walken, Imogen Poots, Mark Ivanir, Anne Sofie von Otter, Madhur Jaffrey, Liraz Charhi, Wallace Shawn, Nina Lee	
N O V E M B E R	6	Fire with Fire	Lionsgate	David Barrett (director); Tom O'Connor (screenplay); Josh Duhamel, Bruce Willis, Vincent D'Onofrio, Rosario Dawson, Nnamdi Asomugha	
N O V E M B E R	9	Skyfall	Metro-Goldwyn-Mayer / Columbia Pictures	Sam Mendes (director); Neal Purvis and Robert Wade, John Logan (screenplay); Daniel Craig, Ralph Fiennes, Judi Dench, Bérénice Marlohe, Naomie Harris, Javier Bardem, Ben Whishaw, Albert Finney, Rory Kinnear, Ola Rapace, Helen McCrory	
N O V E M B E R	9	Starlet	Music Box Films	Sean Baker (director/screenplay); Chris Bergoch (screenplay); Dree Hemingway, Besedka Johnson, Stella Maeve, James Ransone, Karren Karagulian	
N O V E M B E R	16	The Twilight Saga: Breaking Dawn – Part 2	Summit Entertainment	Bill Condon (director); Melissa Rosenberg (screenplay); Kristen Stewart, Robert Pattinson, Michael Sheen, Mackenzie Foy, Billy Burke, Ashley Greene, Taylor Lautner, Peter Facinelli, Elizabeth Reaser, Jackson Rathbone, Nikki Reed, Kellan Lutz, Cameron Bright, Lee Pace, Dakota Fanning, Mia Maestro, Maggie Grace, Christian Camargo, Rami Malek, Daniel Cudmore, Christopher Heyerdahl, Jamie Campbell Bower, Noel Fisher, Wendell Pierce, Casey LaBow, MyAnna Buring, Joe Anderson, Angela Sarafyan, Booboo Stewart, Judith Shekoni, Charlie Bewley, J.D. Pardo, Julia Jones, Lateef Crowder, Toni Trucks, Andrea Gabriel, Chaske Spencer, Omar Metwally, Valorie Curry, Guri Weinberg, Lisa Howard, Patrick Brennan, Amadou Ly	
N O V E M B E R	16	Chasing Ice	National Geographic	Jeff Orlowski (director)	
N O V E M B E R	16	Lincoln	Touchstone Pictures / DreamWorks Pictures / 20th Century Fox / Reliance Entertainment / Participant Media / Amblin Entertainment / The Kennedy/Marshall Company	Steven Spielberg (director); Tony Kushner (screenplay); Daniel Day-Lewis, David Strathairn, Hal Holbrook, Sally Field, Joseph Gordon-Levitt, James Spader, John Hawkes, Tim Blake Nelson, Jared Harris, Tommy Lee Jones, David Oyelowo, Jackie Earle Haley, Dane DeHaan, Lee Pace, Julie White, Walton Goggins, David Costabile, Lukas Haas, Adam Driver, Michael Stuhlbarg, Gulliver McGrath, Elizabeth Marvel, S. Epatha Merkerson, Gloria Reuben, Stephen McKinley Henderson, Bill Camp, Colman Domingo, Bruce McGill, Joseph Cross, Jeremy Strong, Grainger Hines, Dakin Matthews, Peter McRobbie, Bill Raymond, Stephen Spinella, Boris McGiver, David Warshofsky, Raynor Scheine, Christopher Evan Welch, Wayne Duvall, Gregory Itzin	
N O V E M B E R	16	Silver Linings Playbook	The Weinstein Company	David O. Russell (director/screenplay); Bradley Cooper, Jennifer Lawrence, Robert De Niro, Jacki Weaver, John Ortiz, Julia Stiles, Anupam Kher, Chris Tucker, Shea Whigham, Dash Mihok, Paul Herman, Philip Chorba, Brea Bee, Cheryl Williams, Patrick McDade, Matthew Russell, Patsy Meck	
N O V E M B E R	20	Santa Paws 2: The Santa Pups	Walt Disney Studios Home Entertainment / Key Pix Productions	Robert Vince (director/screenplay); Anna McRoberts, Philip Fracassi (screenplay); Cheryl Ladd, George Newbern, Pat Finn, Danny Woodburn, Obba Babatundé, Paul Rae, Jennifer Elise Cox, Audrey Wasilewski, Ali Hillis, Ted Rooney, Bill Chott, Jay Brazeau, Jed Rees, Kaitlyn Maher, Richard Kind, Diedrich Bader, Chris Coppola, Tom Everett Scott, Bonnie Somerville, Josh Flitter, Trevor Wright, G. Hannelius, Marlowe Peyton, Mikey Post, Josh Feldman, Brian T. Finney, Tatiana Gudegast, Aidan Gemme	
N O V E M B E R	21	Life of Pi	20th Century Fox	Ang Lee (director); David Magee (screenplay); Suraj Sharma, Ayush Tandon, Irrfan Khan, Gérard Depardieu, Rafe Spall, Tabu, Adil Hussain, Andrea Di Stefano, Wang Po-chieh, Jag Huang, Mythili Prakash, Ayan Khan, Mohamed Abbas Khaleeli, Vibish Sivakumar, Shravanthi Sainath, Raj Patel, Hadiqa Hamid, Elie Alouf, Gautam Belur	
N O V E M B E R	21	Red Dawn	FilmDistrict / Open Road Films	Dan Bradley (director); Carl Ellsworth, Jeremy Passmore, Vincent Newman, Tony Gilroy (screenplay); Will Yun Lee, Chris Hemsworth, Josh Peck, Adrianne Palicki, Josh Hutcherson, Isabel Lucas, Connor Cruise, Jeffrey Dean Morgan, Alyssa Diaz, Brett Cullen, Edwin Hodge, Julian Alcarez, Michael Beach, Matt Gerald, Kenneth Choi	
N O V E M B E R	21	Rise of the Guardians	Paramount Pictures / DreamWorks Animation	Peter Ramsey (director); David Lindsay-Abaire (screenplay); Chris Pine, Alec Baldwin, Hugh Jackman, Isla Fisher, Jude Law, Dakota Goyo, Jacob Bertrand, Georgie Grieve, Dominique Grund, Olivia Mattingly, Ryan Crego, Peter Ramsey, April Lawrence	
N O V E M B E R	23	Hitchcock	Fox Searchlight Pictures / The Montecito Picture Company	Sacha Gervasi (director); John McLaughlin (screenplay); Anthony Hopkins, Helen Mirren, Michael Wincott, Scarlett Johansson, Jessica Biel, James D'Arcy, Toni Collette, Kurtwood Smith, Danny Huston, Michael Stuhlbarg, Richard Portnow, Ralph Macchio, Wallace Langham, Paul Schackman, Richard Chassler, Josh Yeo	
N O V E M B E R	30	The Collection	LD Entertainment	Marcus Dunstan (director); Marcus Dunstan, Patrick Melton (screenplay); Josh Stewart, Emma Fitzpatrick	
N O V E M B E R	30	Killing Them Softly	The Weinstein Company / Plan B Entertainment / Annapurna Pictures	Andrew Dominik (director/screenplay); Brad Pitt, Vincent Curatola, Scoot McNairy, Ben Mendelsohn, Ray Liotta, Richard Jenkins, James Gandolfini, Trevor Long, Max Casella, Sam Shepard, Slaine	
D E C E M B E R	7	Playing for Keeps	FilmDistrict / Open Road Films	Gabriele Muccino (director); Robbie Fox (screenplay); Gerard Butler, Uma Thurman, Jessica Biel, Dennis Quaid, Noah Lomax, James Tupper, Judy Greer, Catherine Zeta-Jones	
D E C E M B E R	7	Bad Kids Go to Hell	Eagle Films/Phase 4 Films	Matthew Spradlin (director); Amanda Alch, Marc Donato, Augie Duke, Roger Edwards, Ali Faulkner, Cameron Deane Stewart, Ben Browder, Judd Nelson	
D E C E M B E R	7	Deadfall	Magnolia Pictures	Stefan Ruzowitzky (director); Zach Dean (screenplay); Eric Bana, Olivia Wilde, Charlie Hunnam, Sissy Spacek, Kris Kristofferson	
D E C E M B E R	7	The Fitzgerald Family Christmas	Tribeca Film	Edward Burns (director/produced/written); Kerry Bishé, Edward Burns, Heather Burns, Marsha Dietlein, Caitlin FitzGerald, Anita Gillette, Tom Guiry, Ed Lauter, Michael McGlone, Noah Emmerich, Connie Britton	
D E C E M B E R	7	Hyde Park on Hudson	Focus Features	Roger Michell (director); Richard Nelson (screenplay); Bill Murray, Laura Linney, Olivia Williams, Samuel West, Olivia Colman, Elizabeth Wilson, Elizabeth Marvel, Eleanor Bron, Andrew Havill, Martin McDougall	
D E C E M B E R	7	Lay the Favorite	The Weinstein Company	Stephen Frears (director); D.V. DeVincentis (screenplay); Bruce Willis, Rebecca Hall, Catherine Zeta-Jones, Joshua Jackson, Vince Vaughn, Laura Prepon, John Carroll Lynch, Corbin Bernsen, Frank Grillo	
D E C E M B E R	14	The Hobbit: An Unexpected Journey	Warner Bros. Pictures / New Line Cinema / Metro-Goldwyn-Mayer	Peter Jackson (director/screenplay); Fran Walsh, Philippa Boyens, Guillermo del Toro (screenplay); Martin Freeman, Ian McKellen, Richard Armitage, James Nesbitt, Ken Stott, Cate Blanchett, Ian Holm, Christopher Lee, Hugo Weaving, Elijah Wood, Andy Serkis, Graham McTavish, Aidan Turner, Dean O'Gorman, Mark Hadlow, Jed Brophy, Adam Brown, John Callen, Peter Hambleton, William Kircher, Stephen Hunter, Sylvester McCoy, Manu Bennett, Barry Humphries, Conan Stevens, John Rawls, Bret McKenzie, Kiran Shah, Jeffrey Thomas, Benedict Cumberbatch, Peter Jackson, Jabez Olssen, Luke Evans, Dan Hennah, Jarred Blakiston, Robert Kazinsky, Terry Notary, Shane Rangi, Stephen Ure, Michael Mizrahi	
D E C E M B E R	19	The Guilt Trip	Paramount Pictures / Skydance Productions	Anne Fletcher (director); Dan Fogelman (screenplay); Barbra Streisand, Seth Rogen, Brett Cullen, Adam Scott, Ari Graynor, Casey Wilson, Colin Hanks, Yvonne Strahovski, Jeff Kober, Miriam Margolyes, Kathy Najimy, Dale Dickey, Nora Dunn, Brandon Keener, Danny Pudi, Rick Gonzalez, Zabryna Guevara, Robert Curtis Brown, Tom Virtue, Steve Tom, Creed Bratton, Michael Cassidy, Eddie Shin, Amanda Walsh	
D E C E M B E R	19	Monsters, Inc. 3D	Walt Disney Pictures / Pixar Animation Studios	Pete Docter, Lee Unkrich, David Silverman (directors); Andrew Stanton, Daniel Gerson (screenplay); John Goodman, Billy Crystal, Mary Gibbs, Steve Buscemi, James Coburn, Jennifer Tilly, Frank Oz, Bob Peterson, John Ratzenberger, Dan Gerson, Steve Susskind, Bonnie Hunt, Jeff Pidgeon, Samuel Lord Black, Jack Angel, Bob Bergen, Rodger Bumpass, Gino Conforti, Jennifer Darling, Patti Deutsch, Bobby Edner, Paul Eiding, Bill Farmer, Pat Fraley, Teresa Ganzel, Marc John Jefferies, Sherry Lynn, Danny Mann, Mona Marshall, Mickie McGowan, Laraine Newman, Kay Panabaker, Phil Proctor, Guido Quaroni, Jan Rabson, Joe Ranft, David Silverman, Jim Thornton, Lee Unkrich, Greg Berg, Donald Fullilove, Jacques Marin, Patrick Pinney, Wallace Shawn, Patty Wirtz	
D E C E M B E R	19	Zero Dark Thirty	Columbia Pictures / Annapurna Pictures	Kathryn Bigelow (director); Mark Boal (screenplay); Jessica Chastain, Chris Pratt, Joel Edgerton, Kyle Chandler, Jason Clarke, Mark Strong, Jennifer Ehle, James Gandolfini, Harold Perrineau, Mark Duplass, Fredric Lehne, John Barrowman, Jessie Collins, Édgar Ramírez, Fares Fares, Scott Adkins, Jeremy Strong, Callan Mulvey, Taylor Kinney, Mike Colter, Frank Grillo, Christopher Stanley, Stephen Dillane, Mark Valley, John Schwab, Reda Kateb, Homayoun Ershadi, Yoav Levi, Ricky Sekhon	
D E C E M B E R	21	Cirque du Soleil: Worlds Away	Paramount Pictures	Andrew Adamson (director/screenplay); Erica Linz, Igor Zaripov, John Clarke	
D E C E M B E R	21	Jack Reacher	Paramount Pictures / Skydance Productions	Christopher McQuarrie (director/screenplay); Josh Olson (screenplay); Tom Cruise, Rosamund Pike, David Oyelowo, Richard Jenkins, Alexia Fast, Werner Herzog, Robert Duvall, Jai Courtney, Joseph Sikora, Michael Raymond-James, Josh Helman, James Martin Kelly, Nicole Forester, Scott A. Martin	
D E C E M B E R	21	This Is 40	Universal Pictures	Judd Apatow (director/screenplay); Paul Rudd, Leslie Mann, Maude Apatow, Iris Apatow, Graham Parker, Megan Fox, Charlyne Yi, Albert Brooks, John Lithgow, Jason Segel, Chris O'Dowd, Melissa McCarthy, Tim Bagley, Ryan Lee, Lena Dunham, Robert Smigel, Annie Mumolo, Joanne Baron, Ava Sambora, Michael Ian Black, Bill Hader, Billie Joe Armstrong, Ryan Adams, Tom Freund, Bob Andrews, Brinsley Schwarz, Martin Belmont, Andrew Bodnar, Steve Goulding, Scott Hartnell, Ian Laperrière, James van Riemsdyk, Matt Carle	
D E C E M B E R	21	Not Fade Away	Paramount Vantage	David Chase (director/screenplay); Brad Garrett, James Gandolfini, Bella Heathcote, Christopher McDonald, Molly Price, Lisa Lampanelli, John Magaro, Jack Huston, Will Brill, Isiah Whitlock Jr., Dominique McElligott, Meg Guzulescu, Gerard Canonico, Louis Mustillo, Robert Funaro, Justine Lupe, Lucie Pohl, Alfie Stewart, Dominic Sherwood, Julia Garner, Jay Weinberg, Charlie Plummer, Bob Bandiera, Levi Wilson	
D E C E M B E R	25	Django Unchained	The Weinstein Company	Quentin Tarantino (director/screenplay); Christoph Waltz, Jamie Foxx, Leonardo DiCaprio, Samuel L. Jackson, Bruce Dern, Russ Tamblyn, James Remar, Dennis Christopher, James Russo, Don Stroud, Tom Wopat, M.C. Gainey, Robert Carradine, Ted Neeley, Tom Savini, Michael Parks, Quentin Tarantino, Don Johnson, Jonah Hill, Walton Goggins, David Steen, Dana Gourrier, Laura Cayouette, Ato Essandoh, Sammi Rotibi, Franco Nero, Omar J. Dorsey, Cooper Huckabee, Lee Horsley, Rex Linn, Misty Upham, Danièle Watts, Amber Tamblyn, Zoë Bell, Michael Bowen, Jake Garber, James Parks, Jacky Ido, John Jarratt	
D E C E M B E R	25	Les Misérables	Universal Pictures / Relativity Media / Camack International / Working Title Films	Tom Hooper (director); William Nicholson, Alain Boublil, Claude-Michel Schönberg, Herbert Kretzmer (screenplay); Hugh Jackman, Russell Crowe, Eddie Redmayne, Colm Wilkinson, Anne Hathaway, Amanda Seyfried, Samantha Barks, Isabelle Allen, Aaron Tveit, Helena Bonham Carter, Sacha Baron Cohen, Daniel Huttlestone, Frances Ruffelle, Hadley Fraser, Gina Beck, Michael Jibson, Bertie Carvel, Stephen Tate, George Blagden, Killian Donnelly, Fra Fee, Alistair Brammer, Hugh Skinner, Iwan Lewis, Julian Bleach, Kate Fleetwood, Hannah Waddingham, Daniel Evans, Kerry Ellis	
D E C E M B E R	25	Parental Guidance	20th Century Fox / Walden Media / Chernin Entertainment	Andy Fickman (director); Joe Syracuse, Lisa Addario, Lowell Ganz, Babaloo Mandel (screenplay); Billy Crystal, Bette Midler, Marisa Tomei, Tom Everett Scott, Bailee Madison, Joshua Rush, Kyle Harrison Breitkopf, Gedde Watanabe, Rhoda Griffis, Jennifer Crystal Foley, Tony Hawk, Steve Levy, Linda Cohn	
D E C E M B E R	25	West of Memphis	Sony Pictures Classics	Amy J. Berg (director); West Memphis Three	
D E C E M B E R	28	Promised Land	Focus Features / Participant Media / Imagenation Abu Dhabi	Gus Van Sant (director); Matt Damon, John Krasinski (screenplay); Matt Damon, John Krasinski, Rosemarie DeWitt, Frances McDormand, Scoot McNairy, Titus Welliver, Terry Kinney, Tim Guinee, Lucas Black, Hal Holbrook	

== See also ==
- 2012 in American television
- 2012 in the United States
