= Community service (disambiguation) =

Community service is unpaid work performed by a person or group of people for the benefit and betterment of their community.

Community Service may also refer to:

- Community Service (album), a 2002 album by The Crystal Method
- Community Service II, a 2005 album by The Crystal Method
- "Community Service" (Law & Order: UK), a 2009 television episode
- "Community Service" (PEN15), a 2019 television episode
- Community Service: The Movie, a 2012 slasher film
