= The Condemned 2 =

- Theatrical release poster
- Directed by: Roel Reiné
- Written by: Alan B. McElroy
- Produced by: Michael J. Luisi
- Starring: Randy Orton; Eric Roberts; Wes Studi; Steven Michael Quezada
- Cinematography: Roel Reiné
- Edited by: Radu Ion
- Music by: Trevor Morris; Ted Reedy
- Production company: WWE Studios
- Distributed by: Lionsgate
- Release date: November 6, 2015
- Running time: 90 minutes
- Country: United States
- Language: English

The Condemned 2 (also known as The Condemned 2: Desert Prey) is a 2015 American action film directed by Roel Reiné and released by WWE Studios. The film stars Randy Orton, Eric Roberts and Wes Studi. It is the stand-alone sequel to the 2007 action film The Condemned starring Stone Cold Steve Austin. It was distributed via a limited release in the United States and to video on demand on November 6, 2015.

== Plot ==
Similar to the first movie, the protagonist ex-bounty hunter Will (Randy Orton) finds himself in a game of death with several other contestants and is forced to rely on his skills and wits to survive.

== Cast ==
- Randy Orton as Will Tanner
- Eric Roberts as Frank Tanner
- Wes Studi as Cyrus Merrick
- Steven Michael Quezada as Raul Bacarro
- Bill Stinchcomb as Harrigan
- Alex Knight as Cooper
- Dylan Kenin as Travis
- Michael Sheets as James Lange
- Morse Bicknell as Ryan Michaels
- Mark Siversten as Sheriff Eric Ross
- Merritt Glover as Deputy #1
- Matthew Page as Deputy #2
- Stafford Douglas as Hacker Rolf
- Esodie Geiger as Judge H. Onorable
- Audrey Walters as Ada Carlos Gomez
- Monique Candelaria as Danielle Hill
- Jesi Raelyn Rael as Lena
- Sonia Maslovskaya as Alexi

== Production ==
On November 4, 2014, Randy Orton took time off from WWE television. New Mexico Film Office Director Nick Maniatis announced on November 12, 2014 that The Condemned 2, produced by WWE Studios and Lions Gate Films would begin principal photography in New Mexico.

The film was shot in Albuquerque and Zia Pueblo, New Mexico, from November 14 until December 15, 2014. The first official trailer for the film was released September 29, 2015, with the film set to release in limited cinemas across the US and direct to video on November 6 of that same year. It received a Blue-Ray release on January 19, 2016.

== Reception ==
Dennis Harvey of Variety described it as "a belated, barely related sequel generic enough to make the eminently forgettable 2007 original look like an oasis of cinematic personality".
