= Die-ner (Get It?) =

- Directed by: Patrick Horvath
- Written by: Patrick Horvath
- Produced by: David Cummings; Mark Johnson; Seth Allen Martin
- Starring: Joshua Grote; Liesel Kopp; Parker Quinn; Maria Olsen; Larry Purtell; Daniel Schweiger; Jorge Motalvo
- Cinematography: Jonathan Rigattieri
- Edited by: David Fishel
- Music by: Attack Bird
- Distributed by: Osiris Entertainment
- Release date: October 17, 2009
- Running time: 75 minutes
- Country: United States
- Language: English

Die-ner (Get It?) (also known as Kentucky Fried Zombies) is a 2009 American zombie comedy directed and written by Patrick Horvath. It stars Joshua Grote as a serial killer who must contend with his victims as they rise from the dead during a zombie apocalypse. Liesel Kopp and Parker Quinn play a quarreling couple he takes hostage.

== Plot ==
Ken arrives in a small diner and makes small talk with the waitress, Rose. After listening to Rose's story, Ken reveals that he's a serial killer, and he quickly kills her and the cook, Fred. Ken cleans up and hides the bodies, but before he can leave the diner, he hears Kathy and Rob, an unhappily married couple, pulling in. Ken decides to bide his time and wait for an opening, and he pretends to be employed at the diner. As Ken prepares to strike, the local sheriff, Duke, appears. Frustrated by all the interruptions and questions, Ken attempts to bluff his way past Duke, but Fred and Rose stumble out of the storage room and leave Duke satisfied. Not sure what to make of the situation, Ken plays along. When the zombies attack Duke, Ken takes Kathy and Rob hostage, tapes down all the zombies, and decides to wait out the zombie attack. After he dies from his wounds, Duke comes back as a zombie, and they tape him down, too. Kathy and Rob attempt to deal with Ken, the zombies, and Jesse, Duke's talkative deputy, who shows up trying to find out Duke's fate. Eventually, Rob is killed by the zombies, and Jesse, who is torn apart by the zombies, kills Kathy, who is also torn apart by the zombies, including a zombified Rob. Ken attempts to escape from the diner, but he is captured by the zombies and torn apart before he can make it to safety.

== Cast ==
- Joshua Grote as Ken
- Liesel Kopp as Kathy
- Parker Quinn as Rob
- Maria Olsen as Rose
- Larry Purtell as Duke
- Daniel Schweiger as Jesse
- Jorge Montalvo as Fred

== Production ==
The film was shot in nine days. Fellow filmmaker Dallas Hallam served as assistant director. The two later co-directed Entrance.

== Release ==
Die-ner played at the Big Bear Lake International Film Festival on October 17, 2009, and at the Hollywood Film Festival on October 24, 2009. On October 31, 2009, it played at the South African Horrorfest, where Maria Olsen won the Best Supporting Female award. It was released on DVD on August 24, 2010.

== Reception ==
In The Zombie Movie Encyclopedia, academic Peter Dendle called the title "cheesy beyond comprehension" but wrote that the title "belies a wry, offbeat script, some solid performances, and some hilarious zombie moments." In a positive review, Scifi Pulse called the film "compelling, introspective and, at times, claustrophobic". Bruce Kooken of HorrorNews.net also criticized the title but stated that the comedic elements and character development make it an entertaining film.
