= Maria Olsen =

South African film producer and actress

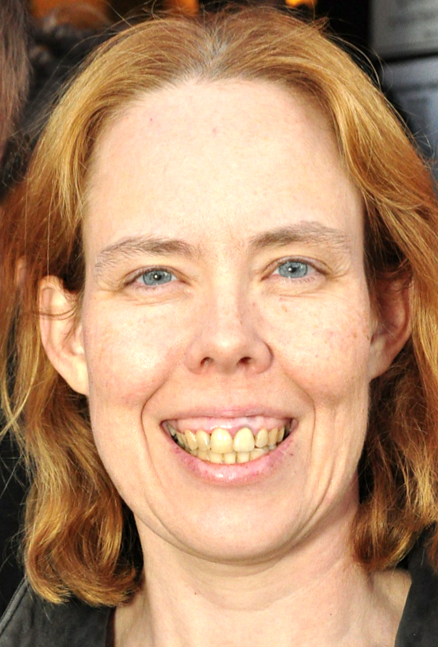
- Olsen in 2010
- Born: July 22, 1966 (age 59); East London, Eastern Cape, South Africa
- Occupations: Actress; film producer
- Years active: 2005–present

Maria Olsen (born July 22, 1966) is a South African film producer and actress known for her many roles in horror films. These include Paranormal Activity 3, The Lords of Salem, Gore Orphanage, and Starry Eyes. Non-horror roles include Percy Jackson & the Olympians: The Lightning Thief.

== Early life ==
Olsen was born on July 22, 1966, in East London, Eastern Cape, South Africa.

== Career ==
Olsen has appeared in over 100 roles since 2005. Many of these are supporting roles, which she credits as allowing her to work on more projects than actors who focus primarily on leading roles. She says her favorite roles have been in African Gothic, Percy Jackson, Die-ner (Get It?), The Haunting of Whaley House, and Live-In Fear, which was the first film she produced.

In 2011, she founded the production company MOnsterworks66.

In 2018, Olsen starred in, "The Exorcist: Forbidden Screening," a 4D theater attraction at Warner Bros. "Horror Made Here: A Festival of Frights." The attraction took place inside the Midwest St. Church on the Warner Brothers backlot, and Olsen played the role of the host of the horror attraction, based on the 1973 film, The Exorcist.

== Filmography ==
=== Film ===
Year	Title	Role	Notes
2009	Die-ner (Get It?)	Rose	
2010	Percy Jackson & the Olympians: The Lightning Thief	Mrs. Dodds/Fury	
2011	Vile	Woman on TV	
2011	Paranormal Activity 3	Creepy Lady	
2012	The Lords of Salem	Dream Sequence Woman	Uncredited
2012	The Cohasset Snuff Film	Melissa Wick	Uncredited
2014	Bunnyman 2	Bus Driver	
2014	Trophy Heads	Mom	
2014	Starry Eyes	The Casting Director	
2015	Southbound	Sandy	
2015	Paranormal Activity: The Ghost Dimension	Coven Woman	Uncredited
2016	Fear, Inc.	Bartender	
2017	The Covenant	Molly Hanning	
2019	I Spit on Your Grave: Deja Vu	Becky Stillman	Main role
2020	There's No Such Thing as Vampires	Sigfreda	
2021	The Resort	Book Store Ghost	
2022	Moon Garden	Princess	
2023	Ronald's Little Factory	Sister Hissem	
2023	Beneath Us All	Janelle Gibbs	

== Personal life ==
Olsen came to America in January 2005. Her hobbies include reading and knitting. She is out as a lesbian.
