= Gore Orphanage (film) =

- Directed by: Emily Lapisardi
- Written by: Cody Knotts; Emily Lapisardi
- Produced by: Kirk Holman; Cody Knotts; Vince Ruffalo
- Starring: Maria Olsen; Bill Townsend; Emma Smith; Keri Maletto
- Cinematography: Nicholas Carrington
- Music by: Benjamin Cornelius-Bates
- Production company: Principalities of Darkness
- Release dates: July 11, 2015 (premiere); July 21, 2015 (Amazon)
- Running time: 90 minutes
- Country: United States
- Language: English

Gore Orphanage is a 2015 independent horror film and the directorial debut of Emily Lapisardi, who co-wrote the film with Cody Knotts. The film premiered at the Sandusky State Theater on July 11, 2015 and was released as a streaming video through Amazon on July 21. The film was inspired by the urban legend by the same name in Vermilion, Ohio.

Filming took place in a classic revival mansion in Scottdale, Pennsylvania. Lapisardi and Knotts were inspired to create the film after researching the legend of the Gore Orphanage and wondering why it hadn't been adapted into a film. In February 2015 Gore Orphanage was named the most anticipated film of 2015 in the Horror Society Awards, which is judged based on reader votes.

== Synopsis ==
Nellie (Emma Smith) is a young orphan who has arrived at an orphanage run by Mrs. Pryor (Maria Olsen), a cruel woman who only sees the facility as a way to earn money. To make matters worse, the orphanage's maintenance man (Bill Townsend) appears to be even more depraved than she is. However, not all is bad, as Nellie is able to make a few friends, including Miss Lillian (Keri Maletto), who helps run the orphanage.As her stay lengthens, Nellie begins to realize that she may not leave the orphanage alive.

== Cast ==
- Maria Olsen as Mrs. Pryor
- Bill Townsend as Ernst
- Emma Smith a Nellie
- Keri Maletto as Miss Lillian
- Nora Hoyle as Esther
- Brandon Mangin Jr. as Buddy
- Rick Montgomery Jr. as Ted
- Jeremy Kaluza as Harmon
- Sharyn Kmieciak as Elderly Nellie
- Nick LaMantia as Schoolboy Rowe
- Ryan Nogy as Anna
- William Sutherland IV as Ralph
- Samantha Ziglear as Irene
- Lakyn Campbell as Amber

== Reception ==
Dread Central's review stated, "Flashes of brilliance from Lapisardi are observed with a few scenes where the kids were allowed to be kids when the evil Mrs. Pryor stepped away from the sightline, and how their happiness went swirling down the hopper when she returned – something so simply shot can result in a great scene of filmmaking, I don’t care how much (or how little) dough is dumped into the project. Alas, what could have been transformed into a straight-up mental twister of a thriller slides down that slippery crap-slope into useless violence in the hopes of reeling in the crowd, and that’s where I almost tuned out."
