= Bunnyman (film) =

2011 film by Carl Lindberg

- DVD released by Osiris Entertainment
- Directed by: Carl Lindbergh
- Written by: Carl Lindbergh
- Produced by: Carl Lindbergh
- Starring: Cheryl Texiera; Matthew Albrecht; Alaina Gianci
- Cinematography: Soraya Selene
- Edited by: Carl Lindbergh
- Music by: Peter Scartabello
- Distributed by: Osiris Entertainment
- Release date: 2011
- Running time: 85 minutes
- Country: United States

Bunnyman (also known as The Bunnyman Massacre in the United Kingdom) is a 2011 American independent slasher film written, directed and produced by Carl Lindbergh.

The film spawned two sequels, Bunnyman 2 released in 2014, and Bunnyman Vengeance which was released on October 20, 2017 on VOD, and November 21st on Blu-ray and DVD.

== Plot ==
The film opens to a snuff film, consisting of 8 mm footage of a handcuffed woman being stabbed to death. The film then switches to six friends—Rachel, John, Tiffany, Mike, Jennifer and Jack—who are driving through a desolate area. They find themselves being harassed by a truck, driven by a man in a rabbit costume who refuses to show himself or communicate with them. He forces them to pull over and parks behind them. After an indeterminate length of time, the costumed man drives away and kills a woman he was holding captive by ripping her in half with chains attached to his truck.

Eventually, the Bunnyman returns and causes the group's car to crash, killing Jack a short while later when he rams the vehicle from behind as Jack is working underneath it. The remaining five proceed to travel on foot, encountering a deranged hillbilly, a woman called Melissa, and a man who advises them to seek shelter in a supposedly abandoned cabin nearby, saying they will return for them after a trip to the hospital. In reality, the two are disposing of the bodies of some of the Bunnyman's victims. En route to the cabin, Mike and Jennifer spot the Bunnyman butchering bodies and he kills the latter with a chainsaw.

Chased to the cabin which belongs to the Bunnyman, the group loses two more members when Mike is killed with a chainsaw, and Tiffany is captured and tortured to death by the Bunnyman and his demented, hunchbacked accomplice, Pops. After the Bunnyman hacks Tiffany's body to pieces and sits down to eat her flesh with Pops and Melissa, the remaining two travelers, Rachel and John, are captured while trying to get Melissa's car keys. As Melissa prepares to murder a bound Rachel, John manages to free himself from his restraints, kills Melissa, and takes her keys and car.

As John and Rachel flee, the Bunnyman gives chase in his truck. Concocting a plan the two pull over and John exits the vehicle carrying an unmoving Rachel who he offers to the Bunnyman. The Bunnyman hesitantly takes Rachel and places her in the cab of his truck, where she springs to life and stabs him in the neck with a pair of scissors, wounding him, and she kicks him out onto the road and driving away after John gets into the truck. As Rachel laments "We're going to need a lot of therapy" the wounded Bunnyman is shown walking off into the sunset. The credits then roll, alongside more 8mm footage depicting what appears to be the young Bunnyman and his family.

== Cast ==
- Cheryl Texiera as Rachel
- Matthew Phillips as John / Bunnyman
- Matthew Stiller as Mike / Bunnyman
- Alaina Agianci as Tiffany
- Veronica Wylie as Jennifer
- Scott Kuza as Jack / Pops
- David Scott as Joe
- Lucia Sullivan as Melissa
- Joseph Darden as Jacob
- Joshua Lang as Bunnyman / Bunnyman Victim / Truck Driver
- Carl Lindbergh as Bunnyman
- Rebecca Scott as Bunnyman Victim
- Karen Brown Cronin as Bunnyman Victim
- Andrew Chavez as Victim
- Shelby Stingley as Bunnyman Victim

== Reception ==
A score of one out of five was awarded by Vegan Voorhees, which described the film as "idiotic" and concluded the review with, "Despite director/writer/producer/actor Lindbergh's impressive enough camera work and production polish, everything that happens in Bunnyman happens wrong. Like a bitter, out of date Easter egg, it's shiny and pretty on the outside and sickening under the foil". 28 Days Later Analysis called Bunnyman an incompetent and frustrating mess, gave it a "generous" three out of ten, and wrote "atrocious acting, zero character development, no tension, zero sense of pacing, poorly written, continuity errors abound, audio problems, ADR and dubbing, poorly written characters, forced tension, meandering story, etc." Gorepress also gave an overwhelmingly negative critique, stating "The Bunnyman Massacre is literally the worst film I've seen in years. Decades, even. Why? Well – simply put – because it's appallingly made on every single level".

Andy Breslow wrote about Grindhouse Edition of the film as: "Bunnyman: Grindhouse Edition is a fun little romp into exploitation territory…when it isn't getting in its own way".

Bethany Rose of Influx magazine said that "Writer/director Carl Lindbergh actually creates a new villain to entertain audiences".

Horror News Network said that "The Bunnyman Massacre is better for what it wants to be and the imagery it leaves behind with its title character. Other than that, it is another forgettable entry into low budget independent horror".
