= Katie Silverman =

American actress (born 2005)

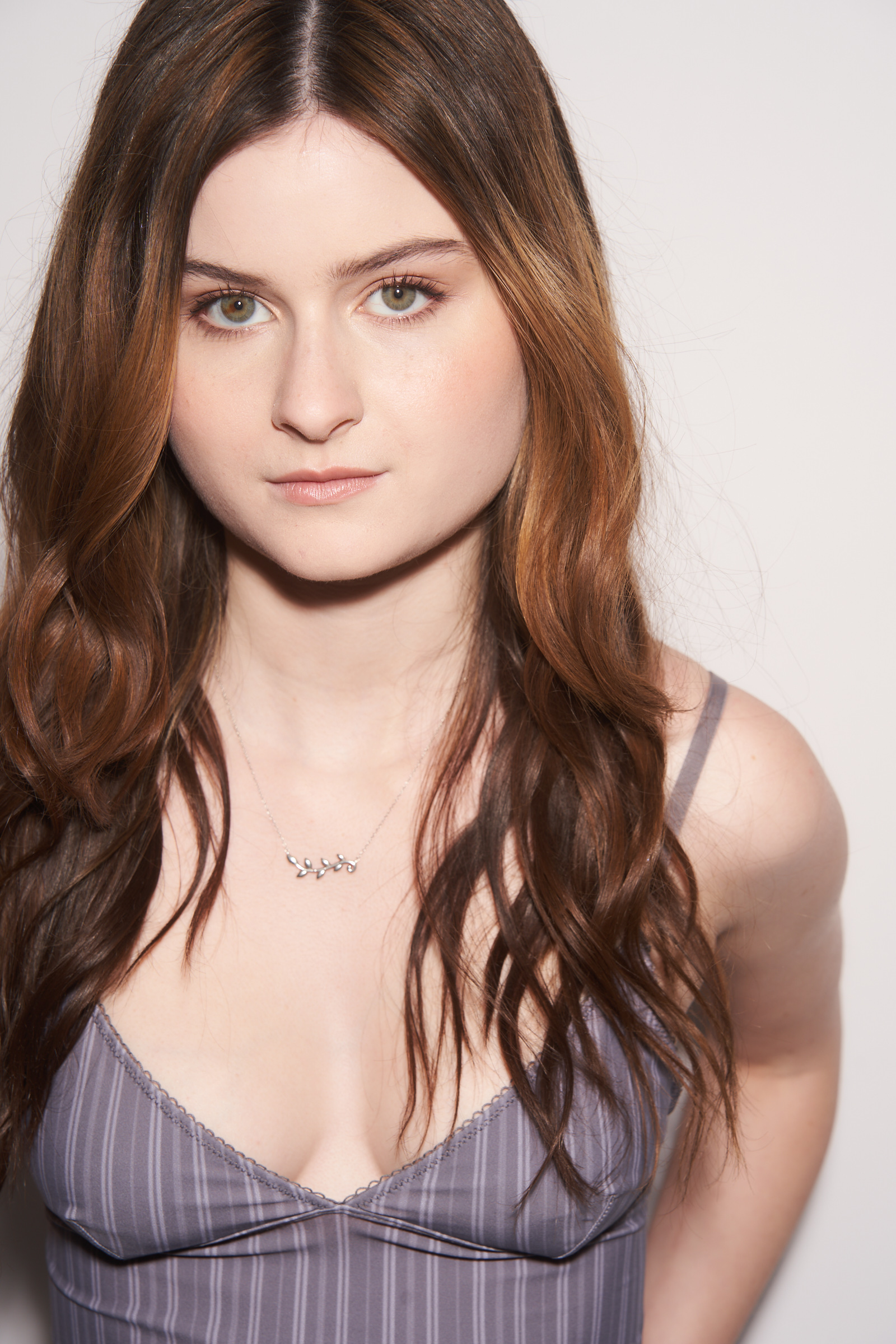
- Born: February 8, 2005 (age 21); Los Angeles, California, U.S.
- Occupation: Actress/ Singer/ Musician/ Songwriter
- Years active: 2010–present
- Website: https://www.katiesilverman.com https://www.queenanneband.com

Katherine "Katie" Silverman (born February 8, 2005) is an American actress and lead singer/songwriter in the indie pop duo band Queen Anne. Known at a young age for portraying the young Jacqueline Bouvier in Michael Wilson's production of Grey Gardens at the Ahmanson Theatre in Los Angeles, California. she has also appeared in multiple feature films and has had recurring roles as Young Jess on Fox's New Girl, Young Penny on ABC's Happy Endings, and Stevie on Hulu's PEN15.

== Life and career ==
Silverman has a sister Ashley, who is also an actress. Silverman attended The Buckley School in Sherman Oaks, California, where she made the National Honor Society and was valedictorian. Silverman was accepted into Harvard University as a member of the Class of 2027. She is co-captain of Harvard's long form improvisation comedy troupe, Three Letter Acronym.

== Filmography ==
=== Film ===
Year	Title	Role	Notes
2013	Walking With Dinosaurs	Dinosaur ID Card	
2013	Frozen	Additional Voices	
2013	Despicable Me 2	Additional Voices	
2014	Styria	Young Lara	
2014	Rawhead & Bloodybones short	Lily	
2015	Tales of Halloween	Young Alice	
2017	Vikes	Wanda	
2017	You Are One Of Them AFI short	Young Jenny	
2023	The Exorcists	Huxley	
2025	Ed Kemper	Mary Ann	
2027	Play The Game		

=== Television ===
Year	Title	Role	Notes
2010	Pretty Little Liars	Young Aria	Episode: "Through Many Dangers, Toils and Snares"
2011	Private Practice	Young Amelia	Episode: "Who We Are"
2012	Happy Endings	Young Penny	2 Episodes
2012-2013	General Hospital	Libby	2 Episodes
2014	How I Met Your Mother	Young Penny Mosby	Episode: "Rally"
2014	Tim & Eric's Bedtime Stories	Katie	Episode "Hole"
2015	Grey's Anatomy	Young Amelia	Episode "Could We Start Again, Please?"
2015	Child Genius	Herself	4 Episodes
2014–2016	New Girl	Young Jess	2 Episodes
2016	Childrens Hospital	Sally	Episode ""The Show You Watch"
2016	Last Week Tonight with John Oliver	911 Kid #3	Episode "Scientific Studies"
2019	PEN15	Stevie	3 Episodes
2023	Mayans M.C.	Liv	2 Episodes
2024	Ted	Amanda	1 Episode
2026	High Potential	Christine	1 Episode

=== Theater ===
Selected credits

Year	Title	Role	Venue	Company	Notes
2017	Grey Gardens	Jackie Bouvier	Ahmanson Theater: May 22 – Aug 22, 2017	Ahmanson Theatre	
2023	Nicky & The Angels	Angie Romano	The Broadwater Second Stage(FringeLA): July, 2023	Hollywood Fringe Festival	
2024	The Pitch	Michelle	The Odyssey Theatre : June 14 – August 1, 2024	The Odyssey Theatre Ensemble	
2025	The Scottish Improv Show	Lady Macbeth	Loeb Experimental Theater : October 23-26, 2025	Harvard Radcliffe Dramatic Club	

== Awards and nominations ==
Year	Award	Category	Work	Result	Ref
2014	Young Artist Award	Best Performance in a Short Film - Leading Young Actress (10 and Under)	Rawhead and Bloodybones	Nominated	
2017	Young Entertainer Awards	Best Young Actress Performance in Live Theatre	Grey Gardens	Won	
2024	Young Entertainer Awards	Best Leading Young Actress - Feature Film	The Exorcists	Won	
