= Bunnyman 2 =

2014 American slasher film

- Film poster
- Directed by: Carl Lindbergh
- Written by: Carl Lindbergh
- Produced by: Carl Lindbergh
- Starring: David Scott; Joshua Lang; Julianne Dowler
- Cinematography: Soraya Sélène
- Edited by: Carl Lindbergh
- Music by: Peter Scartabello
- Release date: April 18, 2014
- Running time: 102 minutes
- Country: United States
- Language: English

Bunnyman 2 (known as The Bunnyman Resurrection in the UK) is a 2014 American independent slasher film written, produced, edited and directed by Carl Lindbergh. It is a sequel to 2011 film Bunnyman by the same director. The plot revolves around a psychopath who dresses in a bunny suit and typically uses a chainsaw to murder people along with his family.

The film is also known as The Bunnyman Massacre (a title sometimes also used for the first film.)

== Synopsis ==
The film opens with the Bunnyman murdering some campers, after which he puts up a sign advertising his friend Joe's general store. This sign later successfully attracts the attention of a group of four hikers while they are out in the forest. Two of them stay behind while their friends, Sarah and Lauren, continue on to the store - the two remaining behind are then slaughtered by the Bunnyman. When they reach the store Joe captures the two women and strikes a bargain with Sarah: he will spare their lives if Sarah lures more victims to Joe. She does as they ask and are released, only for Bunnyman to recapture them shortly thereafter. Meanwhile, the disappearances have piqued the curiosity of local lawman Sheriff Baxter, who is suspicious of Joe after some brief questioning.

Joe and the Bunnyman then proceed to slaughter all of their captured victims, save for Lauren and Sarah, who manage to escape during the carnage. They are discovered by Sheriff Baxter, who hides them in his truck. He then confronts Joe, who overcomes and kills the Sheriff - but not before the other man manages to mortally wound him. Lauren and Sarah are discovered by the Bunnyman. Both women die in the resulting chaos; Lauren is killed by the Bunnyman while Sarah chooses to shoot herself in the head out of fear of a far more gruesome death. The film ends with Bunnyman discovering his dying friend Joe, killing him before wandering off into the woods.

== Cast ==
- Joshua Lang as Bunnyman
- David Scott as Joe
- Julianne Dowler as Sarah
- Jennifer June Ross as Lauren
- Heather Daley as Robin
- Marshal Hilton as Sheriff Clint Baxter

== Production ==
Plans to create a sequel were first announced in 2011, under the working title of Bunnyman 2. Production on the film continued and in 2013 the name was changed to The Bunnyman Massacre.

In an interview with LA Horror, Lindbergh stated that he did not want the film to be seen as campy or cheesy and that he saw it as a "“unique” approach to something very bizarre, almost surreal in a way like a David Lynch film." Cinematic influences on the film included the Friday the 13th film series and Terrence Malick's The Tree of Life. While creating the film Lindbergh tried placing the titular Bunnyman character in new locations such as a circus, however chose to retain the rural, forest setting as the character worked better in those environments.

== Release ==
Bunnyman 2 was released to video on demand and DVD on August 12, 2014.

== Reception ==
Time Out called the acting catastrophic and the production incoherent. A review in Starburst concluded, "As the film progresses, there are some interesting moral dilemmas for the heroines of the piece, but it’s all too late to stop the film really standing out from the low-budget horror pack. For a film that does have some decent moments, it’s just a shame that its central rabbit lacks any sort of sinister kick." Other reviews were mostly negative.

== Sequel ==
The third film in the series is titled Bunnyman Vengeance which was released on October 20, 2017, on video on demand and November 21, 2017, on Blu-ray and DVD.
