= The Cohasset Snuff Film =

2012 horror film by Edward Payson

- Film poster
- Directed by: Edward Payson
- Written by: Edward Payson; Darnell J. Taylor
- Produced by: Edward Payson
- Starring: Stephen Wu; Kelly Marie Tran; Maria Olsen
- Cinematography: Kevin A. McCarthy
- Edited by: Gene Shaw
- Music by: Atlas Mason
- Production company: MVD Entertainment Group
- Distributed by: Found TV
- Release date: February 18, 2012
- Running time: 85 minutes
- Country: United States
- Language: English

The Cohasset Snuff Film is a 2012 American found footage horror film directed by Edward Payson.

== Plot ==
The film takes place in Cohasset, Massachusetts and chronicles the exploits of 17-year-old Collin Mason, a vlogger who goes on to record himself murdering three of his classmates, before uploading the footage to the internet using BitTorrent.

== Cast ==
- Stephen Wu as Collin Mason
- Kelly Marie Tran as Christine Chan
- Maria Olsen as Melissa Wick

== Reception ==
The Cohasset Snuff Film received primarily negative reviews, criticizing the camerawork and underwhelming special effects.

== See also ==
- List of films featuring psychopaths and sociopaths
