= Bill Stinchcomb =

American actor (born 1963)

- Born: June 21, 1963 (age 62); Sarasota, Florida, U.S.
- Occupations: Film and Television Actor
- Years active: 2007–present
- Height: 6 ft 3 in (191 cm)

Bill Stinchcomb (born June 21, 1963) is an American actor. He is known for his roles in films The Chaperone (2011), Battleship (2012) and The Condemned 2 (2015).

== Early life and education ==
Stinchcomb was raised in Sarasota, Florida. He started acting after a casting director approached him while shopping in Target with his children in Shreveport, Louisiana. He has been actively pursuing the dream ever since. Stinchcomb is a retired United States Air Force B-52 pilot and combat veteran of Operation Iraqi Freedom and Operation Enduring Freedom. When not acting, Stinchcomb is a 767 Captain for Delta Air Lines, based in NYC.

== Career ==
Stinchcomb started acting after being approached by a casting director while shopping with his children in Shreveport, Louisiana. His first principal role was in the 2008 release "Private Valentine". He retired from the USAF Reserves after 20 years of service.

As a B-52 Aircraft Commander, he saw combat in both Operation Iraqi Freedom and Operation Enduring Freedom. When not acting, he works as a 767 Captain for a major airline in NYC. Believing "acting class is my batting practice", he studies whenever and wherever he can.

== Filmography ==
Year	Film	Role	Notes
2015	The Last Word	Prison Guard	(post-production)
2015	Symphony of the Universe	Guard #4	(post-production)
2015	Bandito (Short)	Driver	
2015	Halt and Catch Fire	Bartender	Season 2, Episode 1
2014	Sacrifice	Coach Wolden	
2014	The Town That Dreaded Sundown	Mr. Holland	
2014	The Road (Short)	The Driver	
2013	190 Proof (Short)	The Newcomer	
2013	2 Guns	Uniformed Border Agent	
2013	Olympus Has Fallen	Watch Officer	
2013	Legend of Love	Charlie	
2012	This Is a Microphone (Short)	Sergeant	
2012	Unconditional	White leader	
2012	Fire with Fire	Motel Cop #1	
2012	Dallas	Ace / Security #1	Season 1, Episode 1 & 6
2012	Breakout Kings	Alan Simpkins	Season 2, Episode 7
2012	Battleship	Marine Commandant	
2011	Treme	Contractor	Season 2, Episode 2
2011	The Chaperone	Sergeant	
2010	A Light in the Darkness: Part One (Short)	Zalem	
2008	Private Valentine: Blonde & Dangerous	Station Sergeant	
2008	True Blood	Paramedic	Season 1, Episode 7
2008	W.	Secret Service Agent (uncredited)	
2008	My Spy	Officer Jerry (uncredited)	
2008	Harold & Kumar Escape from Guantanamo Bay	Homeland Security Agent (uncredited)	
2008	Mad Money	Cop (uncredited)	
2007	The Great Debaters	Lynch Mob (uncredited)	
2007	Cleaner	Detective (uncredited)	
2007	Ruffian	Bartender	(TV Movie)
