= Community Service: The Movie =

Community Service The Movie
- Film poster
- Directed by: Joseph Patrick Kelly
- Written by: Joseph Patrick Kelly, David Berry
- Starring: Christopher Woods, William Meyers, Joseph P. Kelly
- Cinematography: Don Grimble, Ben Struble
- Edited by: Joseph P. Kelly, Franklin Kielar, Korey L. Owens
- Music by: John Centrone
- Production company: Rusty Nail Productions
- Release date: July 21, 2012
- Running time: 72 minutes
- Country: United States
- Language: English

Community Service The Movie is a 2012 American slasher film written and directed by Joseph Patrick Kelly, and is his feature film directorial debut. The movie was released on July 21, 2012, and stars Chris Woods Marlins as a community service officer dealing with an escaped serial killer with post-traumatic stress disorder. The project was begun while the filmmaker was in college, and serves as a prequel to Bloody Island, which had a projected release date of 2016.

== Synopsis ==
Years ago Billy Fouls (William Meyer) was teased and tormented to the point where he had to be committed to a psychiatric center. Now an adult, Billy decides to break out of the center after hearing that one of his bullies, Bob (Christopher Woods), is now a community service officer and will be holding a program at a campground located very near to his institution. Eager to exact his revenge, Billy escapes and begins to plan a series of bloody murders.

== Cast ==
- Christopher Woods as Officer Bob Butterfield
- William Meyer as Billy Fouls
- Joseph P. Kelly as Adam
- Iliana Garcia as Danelia
- Caitlin Kenyon as Kim
- Hope Tomaselli as Paige
- Renell Edwards as Smith
- Marissa Mynter as Molly
- Daniel Trinh as Dakota
- Tristan MacAvery as Officer Jim Springfield

== Recognition ==
=== Awards and nominations ===
- 2012: won Best Grindhouse Film at Buffalo Niagara Film Festival
- 2012: nominated for Best Feature at New Orleans Film Festival
- 2013: won Excellence in the Art of Filmmaking at Palm Beach International Film Festival
