= List of Eisner Award winners =

The following is a list of winners of the Eisner Award, sorted by category.

The Eisner Awards have been presented since 1988, but there were no Eisner Awards in 1990 due to balloting mix-ups. The awards ceremony has been held at San Diego Comic-Con since 1991.

== People ==
=== Best Writer ===
Year	Winner(s)	Works	Publisher(s)
1988	Alan Moore	Watchmen	DC
1989	Alan Moore	Batman: The Killing Joke	DC
1991	Neil Gaiman	Sandman	DC
1992	Neil Gaiman	Sandman; The Books of Magic; Miracleman	DC; DC; Eclipse
1993	Neil Gaiman	Sandman; Miracleman	DC; Eclipse
1994	Neil Gaiman	Sandman	DC
1995	Alan Moore	From Hell	Kitchen Sink
1996	Alan Moore	From Hell	Kitchen Sink
1997	Alan Moore	From Hell; Supreme	Kitchen Sink; Maximum Press
1998	Garth Ennis	Hitman; Preacher; The Unknown Soldier; Blood Mary: Lady Liberty	DC; DC/Vertigo; DC/Helix
1999	Kurt Busiek	Kurt Busiek's Astro City; Avengers	Homage/WildStorm/Image; Marvel
2000	Alan Moore	The League of Extraordinary Gentlemen; Promethea; Tom Strong; Tomorrow Stories; Top 10	ABC
2001	Alan Moore	The League of Extraordinary Gentlemen; Promethea; Tom Strong; Tomorrow Stories; Top 10	ABC
2002	Brian Michael Bendis	Powers; Alias; Daredevil; Ultimate Spider-Man	Image; Marvel; Marvel; Marvel
2003	Brian Michael Bendis	Powers; Alias; Daredevil; Ultimate Spider-Man	Image; Marvel; Marvel; Marvel
2004	Alan Moore	The League of Extraordinary Gentlemen; Promethea; Smax; Tom Strong; Tom Strong's Terrific Tales	ABC
2005	Brian K. Vaughan	Y: The Last Man; Ex Machina; Runaways; Ultimate X-Men	Vertigo/DC; WildStorm/DC; Marvel; Marvel
2006	Alan Moore	Promethea; Top 10: The Forty-Niners	ABC
2007	Ed Brubaker	Captain America; Criminal; Daredevil	Marvel; Marvel; Marvel
2008	Ed Brubaker	Captain America; Criminal; Daredevil; Immortal Iron Fist	Marvel; Marvel; Marvel; Marvel
2009	Bill Willingham	Fables; House of Mystery	Vertigo/DC; Vertigo/DC
2010	Ed Brubaker	Captain America; Daredevil; The Marvels Project; Criminal; Incognito	Marvel; Marvel; Marvel; Marvel; Marvel
2011	Joe Hill	Locke & Key	IDW
2012	Mark Waid	Irredeemable; Incorruptible; Daredevil	Boom!; Boom!; Marvel
2013	Brian K. Vaughan	Saga	Image
2014	Brian K. Vaughan	Saga	Image
2015	Gene Luen Yang	Avatar: The Last Airbender; The Shadow Hero	Dark Horse; First Second
2016	Jason Aaron	Doctor Strange; Men of Wrath; Thor; Star Wars; Southern Bastards	Marvel; Marvel; Marvel; Marvel; Image
2017	Brian K. Vaughan	Paper Girls; Saga; We Stand On Guard	Image
2018	Tom King | Marjorie Liu (tie)	Batman; Batman Annual #2; Batman/Elmer Fudd Special #1; Mister Miracle | Monstress	DC; DC; DC; DC; Image
2019	Tom King	Batman, Mister Miracle, Heroes in Crisis, Swamp Thing Winter Special	DC; DC; DC; DC
2020	Mariko Tamaki	Harley Quinn: Breaking Glass; Laura Dean Keeps Breaking Up with Me (First Second/Macmillan)	DC; First Second/Macmillan
2021	James Tynion IV	Something Is Killing the Children; Wynd; Batman; The Department of Truth; Razorblades	Boom!; Boom!; DC; Image; Tiny Onion
2022	James Tynion IV	House of Slaughter; Something Is Killing the Children; Wynd; The Nice House on the Lake; The Joker; Batman; DC Pride 2021; The Department of Truth; Blue Book; Razorblades;	Boom!; Boom!; Boom!; DC; DC; DC; DC; Image; Tiny Onion; Tiny Onion
2023	James Tynion IV	House of Slaughter; Something Is Killing the Children; Wynd; The Nice House on the Lake; The Sandman Universe: Nightmare Country; The Closet;The Department of Truth	Boom!; Boom!; Boom!; DC; DC; DC; Image; Image
2024	Mariko Tamaki	Roaming	Drawn & Quarterly
2025	Gene Luen Yang	Lunar New Year Love Story	First Second/Macmillan
2026	Mariko Tamaki	This Place Kills Me	Abrams Fanfare

=== Best Writer/Artist ===
Year	Winner(s)	Works	Publisher(s)
1988	Alan Moore and Dave Gibbons	Watchmen	DC
1989	Paul Chadwick	Concrete	Dark Horse
1991	Frank Miller and Geof Darrow	Hard Boiled	Dark Horse
1992	Peter David and Dale Keown	The Incredible Hulk	Marvel
1993	Frank Miller	Sin City	Dark Horse
1993	Mike Baron and Steve Rude	Nexus: The Origin	Dark Horse
1994	Jeff Smith	Bone	Cartoon Books
1995	Mike Mignola and John Byrne	Hellboy: Seed of Destruction	Dark Horse/Legend
1996	David Lapham	Stray Bullets	El Capitan Books
2009	Chris Ware	Acme Novelty Library	Acme
2010	David Mazzucchelli	Asterios Polyp	Pantheon
2011	Darwyn Cooke	Richard Stark's Parker: The Outfit	IDW
2012	Craig Thompson	Habibi	Pantheon
2013	Chris Ware	Building Stories	Pantheon
2014	Jaime Hernandez	Love and Rockets New Stories #6	Fantagraphics
2015	Raina Telgemeier	Sisters	Scholastic Graphix
2016	Bill Griffith	Invisible Ink: My Mother's Secret Love Affair with Famous Cartoonist	Fantagraphics
2017	Sonny Liew	The Art of Charlie Chan Hock Chye	Pantheon
2018	Emil Ferris	My Favorite Thing is Monsters	Fantagraphics
2019	Jen Wang	The Prince and the Dressmaker	First Second
2020	Raina Telgemeier	Guts	Scholastic Graphix
2021	Junji Ito	Remina, Venus in the Blind Spot	VIZ Media
2022	Barry Windsor-Smith	Monsters	Fantagraphics
2023	Kate Beaton	Ducks: Two Years in the Oil Sands	Drawn & Quarterly
2024	Daniel Warren Johnson	Transformers	Image Skybound
2025	Charles Burns	Kommix; Final Cut; Unwholesome Love	Fantagraphics; Pantheon; co-published with Partners & Son
2026	Jamal Campbell	Zatanna	DC

=== Best Writer/Artist: Drama ===
Caption
Year	Winner(s)	Works	Publishers
1997	Mike Mignola	Hellboy: Wake the Devil	Dark Horse/Legend
1998	Mike Mignola	Hellboy: Almost Colossus; Hellboy Christmas Special; Hellboy Junior Halloween Special	Dark Horse
1999	Frank Miller	300	Dark Horse
2000	Daniel Clowes	Eightball	Fantagraphics
2001	Eric Shanower	Age of Bronze	Image
2002	Daniel Clowes	Eightball	Fantagraphics
2003	Eric Shanower	Age of Bronze	Image
2004	Craig Thompson	Blankets	Top Shelf
2005	Paul Chadwick	Concrete: The Human Dilemma	Dark Horse
2006	Geoff Darrow	Shaolin Cowboy	Burlyman
2007	Paul Pope	Batman: Year 100	DC
2008	Chris Ware	Acme Novelty Library #18	Self-published

=== Best Writer/Artist-Humor ===
Year	Winner(s)	Works	Publishers
1995	Jeff Smith	Bone	Cartoon Books
1996	Sergio Aragonés	Groo	Image Comics
1997	Don Rosa	Walt Disney's Comics & Stories, Uncle Scrooge	Egmont
1998	Jeff Smith	Bone	Cartoon Books
1999	Kyle Baker	You Are Here	DC/Vertigo
2000	Kyle Baker	Die at Midnight "Letitia Lerner, Superman's Babysitter" in Elseworlds 80-Page Giant	Vertigo DC
2001	Tony Millionaire	Maakies; Sock Monkey	Fantagraphics
2002	Evan Dorkin	Dork!	Slave Labor
2003	Tony Millionaire	House at Maakies Corner	Fantagraphics
2004	Kyle Baker	Plastic Man; The New Baker	Kyle Baker Publishing
2005	Kyle Baker	Plastic Man; Kyle Baker Cartoonist	Kyle Baker Publishing
2006	Kyle Baker	Plastic Man; The Bakers	Kyle Baker Publishing
2007	Tony Millionaire	Billy Hazelnuts; Sock Monkey: The Inches Incident	Fantagraphics
2008	Eric Powell	The Goon	Dark Horse

=== Best Writer/Artist–Nonfiction ===
- 2010 Joe Sacco, Footnotes in Gaza (Metropolitan/Holt)

=== Best Painter/Digital Artist ===
This award was previously known as "Best Painter" from 1993 to 1999, as "Best Painter/Multimedia Artist" from 2000 to 2019 and as Best Painter/Multimedia Artist (interior art) as of 2023.

- 1993 Dave Dorman, Aliens: Tribes (Dark Horse)
- 1994 Alex Ross, Marvels (Marvel)
- 1995 Jon J. Muth, The Mystery Play (DC/Vertigo)
- 1996 John Bolton, Batman: Man-Bat (DC)
- 1997 Alex Ross, Kingdom Come (DC)
- 1998 Alex Ross, Uncle Sam (DC/Vertigo)
- 1999 Alex Ross, Superman: Peace on Earth (DC)
- 2000 Alex Ross, Batman: War on Crime (DC)
- 2001 Jill Thompson, Scary Godmother (Sirius)
- 2002 Charles Vess, Rose (Cartoon Books)
- 2003 George Pratt, Wolverine: Netsuke (Marvel)
- 2004 Jill Thompson, "Stray", in The Dark Horse Book of Hauntings (Dark Horse)
- 2005 Teddy Kristiansen, It's a Bird... (Vertigo/DC)
- 2006 José Ladrönn, Hip Flask: Mystery City (Active Images)
- 2007 Jill Thompson, "A Dog and His Boy" in The Dark Horse Book of Monsters; "Love Triangle" in Sexy Chix (Dark Horse); "Fair Division", in Fables: 1001 Nights of Snowfall (Vertigo/DC)
- 2008 Eric Powell, The Goon: Chinatown (Dark Horse)
- 2009 Jill Thompson, Magic Trixie, Magic Trixie Sleeps Over (HarperCollins Children's Books)
- 2010 Jill Thompson, Beasts of Burden (Dark Horse); Magic Trixie and the Dragon (HarperCollins Children's Books)
- 2011 Juanjo Guarnido, Blacksad (Dark Horse)
- 2013 Juanjo Guarnido, Blacksad (Dark Horse)
- 2014 Fiona Staples, Saga (Image)
- 2015 J.H. Williams III, The Sandman: Overture (Vertigo/DC)
- 2016 Dustin Nguyen, Descender (Image)
- 2017 Jill Thompson, Wonder Woman: The True Amazon (DC); Beasts of Burden: What the Cat Dragged In (Dark Horse)
- 2018 Sana Takeda, Monstress (Image)
- 2019 Dustin Nguyen, Descender (Image)
- 2020 Christian Ward, Invisible Kingdom (Berger Books/Dark Horse)
- 2021 Anand RK/John Pearson, Blue in Green (Image)
- 2022 Sana Takeda, Monstress (Image)
- 2023 Sana Takeda, The Night Eaters: She Eats the Night (Abrams ComicArts); Monstress (Image)
- 2024 Sana Takeda, The Night Eaters: Her Little Reapers (Abrams ComicArts); Monstress (Image)
- 2025 Eduardo Risso, The Blood Brothers Mother (DSTLRY)
- 2026 Martin Simmonds, The Department of Truth (Image)

=== Best Artist ===
- 1988 Steve Rude, Nexus (First)
- 1989 Brian Bolland, Batman: The Killing Joke (DC)
- 1991 Steve Rude
- 1992 Simon Bisley, Batman: Judgement on Gotham (DC)

=== Best Penciller ===
- 1993 Steve Rude, Nexus: The Origin (Dark Horse)
- 1997 Steve Rude, Nexus: Executioner's Song (Dark Horse) - Best Penciller

=== Best Inker ===
- 1991 Al Williamson
- 1992 Adam Kubert, Batman Versus Predator (DC and Dark Horse)
- 1993 Kevin Nowlan, Batman: Sword of Azrael (DC)
- 1997 Al Williamson, Spider-Man, Untold Tales of Spider-Man #17-18 (Marvel)

=== Penciller/Inker or Penciller/Inker Team ===
- 1993
  - Frank Miller, Sin City, Dark Horse Presents (Dark Horse) - Best Penciller/Inker, Black & White Publication
  - P. Craig Russell, Fairy Tales of Oscar Wilde (NBM); Robin 3000; Legends of the Dark Knight: Hothouse (DC) - Best Penciller/Inker, Color Publication
- 1994 P. Craig Russell, The Sandman #50 (DC)
- 1995 Dave Gibbons, Martha Washington goes to War (Dark Horse)
- 1996 Geof Darrow, The Big Guy and Rusty the Boy Robot (Dark Horse/Legend)
- 1997 Charles Vess, Book of Ballads and Sagas (Green Man Press); Sandman #75 (DC/Vertigo)
- 1998 P. Craig Russell, Elric: Stormbringer (Dark Horse/Topps); Dr. Strange: What Is It That Disturbs You, Stephen? (Marvel)
- 1999 Tim Sale, Superman for All Seasons (DC); Grendel Black, White, and Red #1 (Dark Horse)
- 2000 Kevin Nowlan, "Jack B. Quick", Tomorrow Stories (ABC)
- 2001 P. Craig Russell, Ring of the Nibelung (Dark Horse/Maverick)
- 2002 Eduardo Risso, 100 Bullets (DC/Vertigo)
- 2003 Kevin O'Neill, The League of Extraordinary Gentlemen (ABC)
- 2004 John Cassaday, Planetary, Planetary/Batman: Night on Earth (WildStorm/DC); Hellboy Weird Tales (Dark Horse)
- 2005 (tie)
  - John Cassaday, Astonishing X-Men (Marvel); Planetary (WildStorm/DC); I Am Legion: The Dancing Faun (Humanoids/DC)
  - Frank Quitely, We3 (Vertigo/DC)
- 2006 John Cassaday, Astonishing X-Men (Marvel); Planetary (WildStorm/DC)
- 2007 Mark Buckingham/Steve Leialoha, Fables (Vertigo/DC)
- 2008 Pia Guerra/Jose Marzan, Jr., Y: The Last Man (Vertigo/DC)
- 2009 Guy Davis, BPRD (Dark Horse)
- 2010 J. H. Williams III, Detective Comics (DC)
- 2011 Skottie Young for The Marvelous Land of Oz
- 2012 Ramón K. Pérez, Jim Henson's Tale of Sand (Archaia)
- 2013 (tie)
  - David Aja, Hawkeye (Marvel)
  - Chris Samnee, Daredevil (Marvel); Rocketeer: Cargo of Doom (IDW)
- 2014 Sean Murphy, The Wake (DC/Vertigo)
- 2015 Fiona Staples, Saga (Image)
- 2016 Cliff Chiang, Paper Girls (Image)
- 2017 Fiona Staples, Saga (Image)
- 2018 Mitch Gerads, Mister Miracle (DC)
- 2019 Mitch Gerads, Mister Miracle (DC)
- 2020 Rosemary Valero-O'Connell, Laura Dean Keeps Breaking Up with Me (First Second/Macmillan)
- 2021 Michael Allred, Bowie: Stardust, Rayguns & Moonage Daydreams (Insight Editions)
- 2022 Phil Jimenez, Wonder Woman Historia: The Amazons (DC)
- 2023 Greg Smallwood, The Human Target (DC)
- 2024 Jillian Tamaki, Roaming (Drawn & Quarterly)
- 2025 Bilquis Evely, Helen of Wyndhorn (Dark Horse)
- 2026 Javier Rodriguez, Absolute Martian Manhunter (DC)

=== Best Art Team ===
- 1988 Steve Rude, Willie Blyberg and Ken Steacy, Space Ghost Special (Comico)
- 1989 Alan Davis and Paul Neary, Excalibur (Marvel)

=== Best Colorist/Coloring ===
- 1992 Steve Oliff, Legends of the Dark Knight (DC), 2112 (Dark Horse), and Akira (Marvel)
- 1993 Steve Oliff/Olyoptics, Legends of the Dark Knight #28-#30, Martian Manhunter: American Secrets (DC); James Bond 007: Serpent's Tooth (Dark Horse); Spawn (Image)
- 1994 Steve Oliff and Rueben Rude/Olyoptics, Spawn (Image)
- 1995 Angus McKie, Martha Washington goes to War (Dark Horse)
- 1996 Chris Ware, The Acme Novelty Library (Fantagraphics)
- 1997 Matt Hollingsworth, Preacher; Death: The Time of Your Life (DC/Vertigo); Bloody Mary (DC/Helix); Challengers of the Unknown (DC)
- 1998 Chris Ware, The Acme Novelty Library (Fantagraphics)
- 1999 Lynn Varley, 300 (Dark Horse)
- 2000 Laura DePuy, The Authority; Planetary (DC/Wildstorm)
- 2001 Chris Ware, Acme Novelty Library #14 (Fantagraphics)
- 2002 Laura DePuy, Ruse (CrossGen), Ministry of Space (Image)
- 2003 Dave Stewart, Hellboy: The Third Wish, The Amazing Screw-On Head, Star Wars: Empire (Dark Horse); Human Target: Final Cut, Doom Patrol (DC/Vertigo); Tom Strong (ABC); Captain America (Marvel)
- 2004 Patricia Mulvihill, Batman, Wonder Woman (DC), 100 Bullets (Vertigo/DC)
- 2005 Dave Stewart, Daredevil, Ultimate X-Men, Ultimate Six, Captain America (Marvel); Conan, BPRD (Dark Horse); DC: The New Frontier (DC)
- 2006 Chris Ware, The Acme Novelty Library #16 (Acme Novelty)
- 2007 Dave Stewart, BPRD, Conan, The Escapists, Hellboy (Dark Horse); Action Comics, Batman/The Spirit, Superman (DC)
- 2008 Dave Stewart, BPRD, Buffy the Vampire Slayer, Cut, Hellboy, Lobster Johnson, The Umbrella Academy (Dark Horse); The Spirit (DC)
- 2009 Dave Stewart, Abe Sapien: The Drowning, BPRD, The Goon, Hellboy, Solomon Kane, The Umbrella Academy (Dark Horse); Body Bags (Image); Captain America: White (Marvel)
- 2010 Dave Stewart, Abe Sapien, BPRD, The Goon, Hellboy, Solomon Kane, The Umbrella Academy, Zero Killer (Dark Horse); Detective Comics (DC); Luna Park (Vertigo)
- 2011 Dave Stewart, Hellboy, BPRD, Baltimore, Let Me In (Dark Horse); Detective Comics (DC); Neil Young's Greendale, Daytripper, Joe the Barbarian (Vertigo/DC)
- 2012 Laura Allred, iZombie (Vertigo/DC); Madman All-New Giant-Size Super-Ginchy Special (Image)
- 2013 Dave Stewart, Batwoman (DC); Fatale (Image); BPRD, Conan the Barbarian, Hellboy in Hell, Lobster Johnson, The Massive (Dark Horse)
- 2014 Jordie Bellaire, The Manhattan Projects, Nowhere Men, Pretty Deadly, Zero (Image); The Massive (Dark Horse); Tom Strong (DC); X-Files Season 10 (IDW); Captain Marvel, Journey into Mystery (Marvel); Numbercruncher (Titan); Quantum and Woody (Valiant)
- 2015 Dave Stewart, Hellboy in Hell, BPRD, Abe Sapien, Baltimore, Lobster Johnson, Witchfinder, Shaolin Cowboy, Aliens: Fire and Stone, Dark Horse Presents (Dark Horse)
- 2016 Jordie Bellaire, The Autumnlands, Injection, Plutona, Pretty Deadly, The Surface, They're Not Like Us, Zero (Image), The X-Files (IDW), The Massive (Dark Horse), Magneto, Vision (Marvel)
- 2017 Matt Wilson, Cry Havoc, Paper Girls, The Wicked + The Divine (Image); Black Widow, The Mighty Thor, Star-Lord (Marvel)
- 2018 Emil Ferris, My Favorite Thing Is Monsters (Fantagraphics)
- 2019 Matt Wilson, Black Cloud, Paper Girls, The Wicked + The Divine (Image); The Mighty Thor, Runaways (Marvel)
- 2020 Dave Stewart, Black Hammer, B.P.R.D.: The Devil You Know, Hellboy and the BPRD (Dark Horse); Gideon Falls (Image); Silver Surfer Black, Spider-Man (Marvel)
- 2021 Laura Allred, X-Ray Robot (Dark Horse); Bowie: Stardust, Rayguns & Moonage Daydreams (Insight Editions)
- 2022 Matt Wilson, Undiscovered Country (Image); Fire Power (Image Skybound); Eternals, Thor, Wolverine (Marvel); Jonna and the Unpossible Monsters (Oni)
- 2023 Jordie Bellaire, The Nice House on the Lake, Suicide Squad: Blaze (DC); Antman, Miracleman by Gaiman & Buckingham: The Silver Age (Marvel)
- 2024 Jordie Bellaire, Batman, Birds of Prey (DC); Dark Spaces: Hollywood Special (IDW)
- 2025 Jordie Bellaire, Absolute Wonder Woman, Birds of Prey, John Constantine, Hellblazer: Dead in America, The Nice House by the Sea (DC); The City Beneath Her Feet (DSTLRY); The Exorcism at 1600 Penn (IDW); W0rldtr33 (Image); G.I. Joe, Duke (Image Skybound)
- 2026 Jordie Bellaire, Absolute Wonder Woman, The Nice House by the Sea (DC); The Exorcism at 1600 Penn (IDW); Assorted Crisis Events, The Department of Truth, Exquisite Corpses, W0RLDTR33 (Image); GI Joe (Image/Skybound); EC Catacomb of Torment, EC Epitaphs from the Abyss (Oni Press)

=== Best Letterer/Lettering ===
- 1993 Todd Klein, The Sandman, The Demon (DC)
- 1994 Todd Klein, Sandman (DC)
- 1995 Todd Klein, Batman Versus Predator II (DC/Dark Horse); The Demon (DC), Sandman (DC/Vertigo); Uncle Scrooge (Gladstone)
- 1996 Stan Sakai, Groo (Image); Usagi Yojimbo (Mirage)
- 1997 Todd Klein, Sandman; Death: The Time of Your Life, House of Secrets, The Dreaming (DC/Vertigo); Batman, The Spectre, Kingdom Come (DC)
- 1998 Todd Klein, Batman, Batman: Poison Ivy (DC); The Dreaming, House of Secrets, The Invisibles, Uncle Sam (DC/Vertigo); Uncle Scrooge Adventures (Gladstone); Castle Waiting (Olio)
- 1999 Todd Klein, Castle Waiting (Olio); House of Secrets, The Invisibles, The Dreaming (DC/Vertigo)
- 2000 Todd Klein, Promethea, Tom Strong, Tomorrow Stories, Top 10 (ABC); The Dreaming, Gifts of the Night, The Invisibles, Sandman Presents: Lucifer (DC/Vertigo)
- 2001 Todd Klein, Promethea, Tom Strong, Tomorrow Stories, Top 10 (ABC); The Invisibles, The Dreaming (DC/Vertigo); Castle Waiting (Cartoon Books)
- 2002 Todd Klein, Promethea, Tom Strong, Tomorrow Stories, Top 10, Greyshirt (ABC); Sandman Presents: Everything You Always Wanted to Know About Dreams But Were Afraid to Ask (DC/Vertigo); Detective Comics, The Dark Knight Strikes Again (DC); Castle Waiting (Olio); Universe X (Marvel)
- 2003 Todd Klein, The Dark Knight Strikes Again, Detective Comics, Wonder Woman: The Hiketeia (DC); Fables, Human Target: Final Cut (DC/Vertigo); Promethea, Tom Strong (ABC); Castle Waiting (Olio)
- 2004 Todd Klein, Detective Comics (DC); Fables, Sandman: Endless Nights (Vertigo/DC); Tom Strong, Promethea (ABC); Marvel 1602 (Marvel)
- 2005 Todd Klein, Promethea, Tom Strong, Tom Strong's Terrific Tales (ABC); Wonder Woman (DC); Books of Magick: Life During Wartime, Fables, WE3 (Vertigo/DC); Creatures of the Night (Dark Horse)
- 2006 Todd Klein, Wonder Woman, Justice, Seven Soldiers #0 (DC); Desolation Jones (Wildstorm/DC); Promethea, Tomorrow Stores Special, Top 10: The 49ers (ABC); Fables (Vertigo); 1602: New World (Marvel)
- 2007 Todd Klein, Fables, Jack of Fables, Fables: 1001 Nights of Snowfall; Pride of Baghdad, Testament (Vertigo/DC); 1602: Fantastick Four, Eternals (Marvel); Lost Girls (Top Shelf)
- 2008 Todd Klein, Justice, Simon Dark (DC); Fables, Jack of Fables, Crossing Midnight (Vertigo/DC); The League of Extraordinary Gentlemen: The Black Dossier (WildStorm/DC); Nexus (Rude Dude)
- 2009 Chris Ware, Acme Novelty Library #19 (Acme)
- 2010 David Mazzucchelli, Asterios Polyp (Pantheon)
- 2011 Todd Klein, Fables, The Unwritten, Joe the Barbarian, iZombie (Vertigo/DC); Tom Strong and the Robots of Doom (WildStorm/DC); S.H.I.E.L.D. (Marvel); Driver for the Dead (Radical)
- 2012 Stan Sakai, Usagi Yojimbo (Dark Horse)
- 2013 Chris Ware, Building Stories (Pantheon)
- 2014 Darwyn Cooke, Richard Stark's Parker: Slayground (IDW)
- 2015 Stan Sakai, Usagi Yojimbo: Senso, Usagi Yojimbo Color Special: The Artist (Dark Horse)
- 2016 Derf Backderf, Trashed (Abrams)
- 2017 Todd Klein, Clean Room, Dark Night, Lucifer (Vertigo/DC); Black Hammer (Dark Horse)
- 2018 Stan Sakai, Usagi Yojimbo, Groo: Slay of the Gods (Dark Horse)
- 2019 Todd Klein, Black Hammer: Age of Doom, Neil Gaiman's A Study in Emerald (Dark Horse); Batman: White Knight (DC); Eternity Girl, Books of Magic (Vertigo/DC); The League of Extraordinary Gentlemen: The Tempest (Top Shelf/IDW)
- 2020 Stan Sakai, Usagi Yojimbo (IDW)
- 2021 Stan Sakai, Usagi Yojimbo (IDW)
- 2022 Barry Windsor-Smith, Monsters (Fantagraphics)
- 2023 Stan Sakai, Usagi Yojimbo (IDW)
- 2024 Hassan Otsmane-Elhaou, The Unlikely Story of Felix and Macabber, The Witcher: Wild Animals, and others (Dark Horse); Batman: City of Madness, The Flash, Poison Ivy, and others (DC); Black Cat Social Club (Humanoids); Beneath the Trees Where Nobody Sees (IDW); The Cull, What's the Furthest Place from Here? (Image); and others
- 2025 Clayton Cowles, Animal Pound (BOOM! Studios); FML, Helen of Wyndhorn (Dark Horse); Absolute Batman, Batman, Batman & Robin: Year One, Birds of Prey, Jenny Sparks, Wonder Woman (DC); Strange Academy, Venom (Marvel)
- 2026 Hassan Otsmane-Elhaou, Ill Vacation, Stillman (Comixology Originals); Absolute Martian Manhunter, Challengers of the Unknown, DC K.O., The Flash, Green Arrow, Poison Ivy (DC); Beneath the Trees Where Nobody Sees, The Exorcism at 1600 Penn, Starship Godzilla, (IDW); Author Immortal (Image); Our-Soot-Stained Heart (Mad Cave)

=== Best Cover Artist ===
- 1992 Brian Bolland, Animal Man (DC)
- 1993 Brian Bolland, Animal Man; Wonder Woman (DC)
- 1994 Brian Bolland, Animal Man; Wonder Woman (DC)
- 1995 Glenn Fabry, Hellblazer (DC/Vertigo)
- 1996 Alex Ross, Kurt Busiek's Astro City (Jukebox Productions/Image)
- 1997 Alex Ross, Kingdom Come (DC); Kurt Busiek's Astro City (Jukebox Productions/Homage)
- 1998 Alex Ross, Kurt Busiek's Astro City (Jukebox Productions/Homage); Uncle Sam (DC/Vertigo)
- 1999 Brian Bolland, The Invisibles (DC/Vertigo)
- 2000 Alex Ross, Batman: No Man's Land; Batman: Harley Quinn; Batman: War on Crime (DC); Kurt Busiek's Astro City (Homage/Wildstorm/DC); ABC alternate #1 covers
- 2001 Brian Bolland, Batman: Gotham Knights; The Flash (DC); The Invisibles (DC/Vertigo)
- 2002 Dave Johnson, Detective Comics (DC); 100 Bullets (DC/Vertigo)
- 2003 Adam Hughes, Wonder Woman (DC)
- 2004 James Jean, Fables (Vertigo/DC); Batgirl (DC)
- 2005 James Jean, Fables (Vertigo/DC); Green Arrow, Batgirl (DC)
- 2006 James Jean, Fables (Vertigo/DC); Runaways (Marvel)
- 2007 James Jean, Fables, Jack of Fables, Fables: 1001 Nights of Snowfall (Vertigo/DC)
- 2008 James Jean, Fables (Vertigo/DC); The Umbrella Academy (Dark Horse); Process Recess 2, Superior Showcase 2 (AdHouse)
- 2009 James Jean, Fables (Vertigo/DC); The Umbrella Academy (Dark Horse)
- 2010 J.H. Williams III, Detective Comics (DC)
- 2011 Mike Mignola, Baltimore: The Plague Ships
- 2012 Francesco Francavilla, Black Panther (Marvel); Lone Ranger, Lone Ranger/Zorro, Dark Shadows, Warlord of Mars (Dynamite); Archie Meets Kiss (Archie)
- 2013 David Aja, Hawkeye (Marvel)
- 2014 David Aja, Hawkeye (Marvel)
- 2015 Darwyn Cooke, DC Comics Darwyn Cooke Month Variant Covers (DC)
- 2016 David Aja, Hawkeye, Karnak, Scarlet Witch (Marvel)
- 2017 Fiona Staples, Saga (Image)
- 2018 Sana Takeda, Monstress (Image)
- 2019 Jen Bartel, Blackbird (Image); Submerged (Vault)
- 2020 Emma Ríos, Pretty Deadly (Image)
- 2021 Peach Momoko, Buffy the Vampire Slayer #19, Mighty Morphin #2, Something Is Killing the Children #12, Power Rangers #1 (BOOM! Studios); DIE!namite, Vampirella (Dynamite); The Crow: Lethe (IDW); Marvel Cover Variants (Marvel)
- 2022 Jen Bartel, Future State Immortal Wonder Woman #1 & 2, Wonder Woman Black & Gold #1, Wonder Woman 80th Anniversary (DC); Women's History Month variant covers (Marvel)
- 2023 Bruno Redondo, Nightwing (DC)
- 2024 Peach Momoko, Demon Wars: Scarlet Sin, various alternate covers (Marvel)
- 2025 Tula Lotay, Helen of Wyndhorn #1, Count Crowley: Mediocre Midnight Monster Hunter #3, Dawnrunner #1, Barnstormers TPB (Dark Horse); Somna and other titles (DSTLRY); The Horizon Experiment (Image)
- 2026 Javier Rodriguez, Absolute Martian Manhunter, Batman & Robin: Year One #7, The New Gods #8 (DC)

=== Talent Deserving of Wider Recognition ===
- 1995 Evan Dorkin (Milk and Cheese, Hectic Planet, Dork, Instant Piano)
- 1996 Stan Sakai (Usagi Yojimbo)
- 1997 Ricardo Delgado (Age of Reptiles)
- 1998 Linda Medley (Castle Waiting)
- 1999 Brian Michael Bendis (Jinx, Goldfish, Torso)
- 2000 Tony Millionaire (Sock Monkey)
- 2001 Alex Robinson (Box Office Poison)
- 2002 Dylan Horrocks (Hicksville, Atlas)
- 2003 Jason Shiga, Fleep (Sparkplug Comics)
- 2004 Derek Kirk Kim (Same Difference & Other Stories)
- 2005 Sean McKeever (The Waiting Place, Mary Jane, Inhumans, Sentinel)
- 2006 Aaron Renier (Spiral-Bound)

=== Special Recognition ===
- 2007 Hope Larson (Gray Horses, Oni)
- 2008 Chuck BB, Black Metal (artist, Oni)

=== Best Editor ===
- 1992 Karen Berger, The Sandman; Shade: the Changing Man; Kid Eternity; Books of Magic (DC)
- 1993 Archie Goodwin, Legends of the Dark Knight; Batman: Sword of Azrael; Deadman: Exorcism (DC)
- 1994 (tie)
  - Karen Berger, The Sandman (DC)
  - Mike Carlin, for the Superman titles: Action Comics; Superman; Superman: The Man Steel, Adventures of Superman (DC)
- 1995 Karen Berger, The Sandman; Sandman Mystery Theatre (DC/Vertigo)
- 1996 (tie)
  - Stuart Moore, Swamp Thing; The Invisibles; Preacher (DC/Vertigo)
  - Bronwyn Carlton, Big Book of Weirdos; Big Book of Conspiracies; Brooklyn Dreams; Stuck Rubber Baby (Paradox Press)
- 1997 Dan Raspler, Kingdom Come; Hitman; The Spectre; Sergio Aragonés Destroys the DC Universe (DC)

== Works ==
=== Best Single Issue/One-Shot ===
- 1988 Gumby Summer Fun Special #1, by Bob Burden and Art Adams (Comico)
- 1989 Kings in Disguise #1, by James Vance and Dan Burr (Kitchen Sink)
- 1991 Concrete Celebrates Earth Day, by Paul Chadwick, Charles Vess and Jean Giraud (also known as Moebius) (Dark Horse Comics)
- 1992 Sandman #22–28, by Neil Gaiman and various artists (DC)
- 1993 Nexus: The Origin by Mike Baron and Steve Rude (Dark Horse)
- 1994 Batman Adventures: Mad Love, by Paul Dini and Bruce Timm (DC)
- 1995 Batman Adventures Holiday Special by Paul Dini, Bruce Timm, Ronnie del Carmen, and others (DC)
- 1996 Kurt Busiek's Astro City #4: "Safeguards", by Kurt Busiek and Brent Anderson (Jukebox Productions/Image)
- 1997 Kurt Busiek's Astro City, vol. 2, #1: "Welcome to Astro City", Kurt Busiek, Brent Anderson, and Will Blyberg (Jukebox Productions/Homage)
- 1998 Kurt Busiek's Astro City vol. 2 #10: "Show 'Em All", Kurt Busiek, Brent Anderson, and Will Blyberg (Jukebox Productions/Homage)
- 1999 Hitman #34: "Of Thee I Sing", by Garth Ennis, John McCrea, and Garry Leach (DC)
- 2000 Tom Strong #1: "How Tom Strong Got Started", by Alan Moore, Chris Sprouse, and Al Gordon (ABC)
- 2001 Promethea #10: "Sex, Stars, and Serpents", by Alan Moore, J.H. Williams III, and Mick Gray (ABC)
- 2002 Eightball #22, by Daniel Clowes (Fantagraphics)
- 2003 The Stuff of Dreams, by Kim Deitch (Fantagraphics)
- 2004 (tie)
  - Conan The Legend #0, by Kurt Busiek and Cary Nord (Dark Horse)
  - The Goon #1, by Eric Powell (Dark Horse)
- 2005 Eightball #23: "The Death Ray" by Daniel Clowes (Fantagraphics)
- 2006 Solo #5 by Darwyn Cooke (DC)
- 2007 Batman/The Spirit #1 by Jeph Loeb and Darwyn Cooke (DC)
- 2008 Justice League of America #11: "Walls" by Brad Meltzer and Gene Ha (DC)
- 2009 No Award Given
- 2010 Captain America #601: "Red, White, and Blue-Blood" by Ed Brubaker and Gene Colan (Marvel)
- 2011 Hellboy: Double Feature of Evil, by Mike Mignola, and Richard Corben
- 2012 Daredevil #7, by Mark Waid, Paolo Rivera, and Joe Rivera (Marvel)
- 2013 The Mire, by Becky Cloonan (self-published)
- 2014 Hawkeye #11: "Pizza Is My Business," by Matt Fraction and David Aja (Marvel)
- 2015 Beasts of Burden: Hunters and Gatherers, by Evan Dorkin and Jill Thompson (Dark Horse)
- 2016 Silver Surfer #11: "Never After", by Dan Slott and Michael Allred (Marvel)
- 2017 Beasts of Burden: What the Cat Dragged In, by Evan Dorkin, Sarah Dyer and Jill Thompson (Dark Horse)
- 2018 Hellboy: Krampusnacht, by Mike Mignola and Adam Hughes (Dark Horse)
- 2019 Peter Parker: The Spectacular Spider-Man #310, by Chip Zdarsky (Marvel)
- 2020 Our Favorite Thing is My Favorite Thing is Monsters, by Emil Ferris (Fantagraphics)
- 2021 Sports Is Hell, by Ben Passmore (Koyama Press)
- 2022 Wonder Woman Historia: The Amazons, by Kelly Sue DeConnick and Phil Jimenez (DC)
- 2023 Batman: One Bad Day: The Riddler, by Tom King and Mitch Gerads (DC)
- 2024 Nightwing #105, by Tom Taylor and Bruno Redondo (DC)
- 2025 The War on Gaza by Joe Sacco (Fantagraphics)
- 2026 Absolute Batman 2025 Annual #1, by Daniel Warren Johnson, James Harren, and Meredith McClaren (DC)

=== Best Short Story ===
- 1993 "Two Cities", by Mark Schultz, in Xenozoic Tales #12 (Kitchen Sink)
- 1994 "The Amazing Colossal Homer", in Simpsons #1 (Bongo)
- 1995 "The Babe Wore Red", by Frank Miller, in Sin City: The Babe Wore Red and Other Stories (Dark Horse/Legend)
- 1996 "The Eltingville Comic-Book, Science-Fiction, Fantasy, Horror, and Role-Playing Club in Bring Me the Head of Boba Fett" by Evan Dorkin, in Instant Piano #3 (Dark Horse)
- 1997 "Heroes", Archie Goodwin and Gary Gianni, in Batman: Black & White #4 (DC)
- 1998 "The Eltingville Comic Book, Science-Fiction, Fantasy, Horror and Role-Playing Club In: The Marathon Men", Evan Dorkin, in Dork! #4 (Slave Labor)
- 1999 "Devil's Advocate", by Matt Wagner and Tim Sale, in Grendel: Black, White, and Red #1 (Dark Horse)
- 2000 "Letitia Lerner, Superman's Babysitter", by Kyle Baker, in Elseworlds 80-Page Giant (DC)
- 2001 "The Gorilla Suit", by Sergio Aragonés, in Streetwise (TwoMorrows)
- 2002 "The Eltingville Club in 'The Intervention", by Evan Dorkin, in Dork! #9 (Slave Labor)
- 2003 "The Magician and the Snake", by Katie Mignola and Mike Mignola, in Dark Horse Maverick: Happy Endings (Dark Horse)
- 2004 "Death", by Neil Gaiman and P. Craig Russell, in The Sandman: Endless Nights (Vertigo/DC)
- 2005 "Unfamiliar", by Evan Dorkin and Jill Thompson, in The Dark Horse Book of Witchcraft (Dark Horse Books)
- 2006 "Teenaged Sidekick", by Paul Pope, in Solo #3 (DC)
- 2007 "A Frog's Eye View", by Bill Willingham and James Jean, in Fables: 1001 Nights of Snowfall (Vertigo/DC)
- 2008 "Mr. Wonderful", by Dan Clowes, serialized in New York Times Sunday Magazine
- 2009 "Murder He Wrote," by Ian Boothby, Nina Matsumoto and Andrew Pepoy, in The Simpsons' Treehouse of Horror #14 (Bongo Comics)
- 2010 "Urgent Request," by Gene Luen Yang and Derek Kirk Kim, in The Eternal Smile (First Second)
- 2011 "Post Mortem", by Greg Rucka and Michael Lark, in I Am an Avenger #2 (Marvel)
- 2012 "The Seventh", by Darwyn Cooke, in Richard Stark's Parker: The Martini Edition (IDW)
- 2013 "Moon 1969: The True Story of the 1969 Moon Launch", by Michael Kupperman, in Tales Designed to Thrizzle #8 (Fantagraphics)
- 2014 "Untitled", by Gilbert Hernandez, in Love and Rockets: New Stories #6 (Fantagraphics)
- 2015 "When the Darkness Presses", by Emily Caroll (Self-published)
- 2016 "Killing and Dying", by Adrian Tomine, in Optic Nerve #14 (Drawn & Quarterly)
- 2017 "Good Boy", by Tom King and David Finch, in Batman Annual #1 (DC)
- 2018 "A Life in Comics: The Graphic Adventures of Karen Green", by Nick Sousanis, in Columbia Magazine
- 2019 "The Talk of the Saints", by Tom King and Jason Fabok, in Swamp Thing Winter Special (DC)
- 2020 "Hot Comb", by Ebony Flowers, in Hot Comb (Drawn & Quarterly)
- 2021 "When the Menopausal Carnival Comes to Town", by Mimi Pond, in Menopause: A Comic Treatment (Graphic Medicine/Pennsylvania State University Press)
- 2022 "Funeral in Foam", by Casey Gilly and Raina Telgemeier, in You Died: An Anthology of the Afterlife (Iron Circus)
- 2023 "Finding Batman", by Kevin Conroy and J. Bone in DC Pride 2022 (DC)
- 2024 “The Kelpie,” by Becky Cloonan, in Four Gathered on Christmas Eve (Dark Horse)
- 2026 “Blood Harvest,” in Brain Damage, by Shintaro Kago, translated by Zack Davisson (Fantagraphics)

=== Best Serialized Story ===
- 1993 "From Hell" by Alan Moore and Eddie Campbell in Taboo (SpiderBaby Graphix/Tundra)
- 1994 "The Great Cow Race", Bone #7-11, by Jeff Smith (Cartoon Books)
- 1995 "The Life and Times of Scrooge McDuck", by Don Rosa, Uncle Scrooge #285–296 (Gladstone)
- 1996 Strangers in Paradise #1–8: "I Dream of You", by Terry Moore (Abstract Studios)
- 1997 Starman #20–23: "Sand and Stars", James Robinson, Tony Harris, Guy Davis, and Wade von Grawbadger (DC)
- 1998 Kurt Busiek's Astro City #4–9: "Confession", Kurt Busiek, Brent Anderson, and Will Blyberg (Jukebox Productions/Homage)
- 1999 Usagi Yojimbo #13–22: "Grasscutter", by Stan Sakai (Dark Horse)
- 2000 Tom Strong #4–7, by Alan Moore, Chris Sprouse, Al Gordon, and guest artists (ABC)
- 2001 100 Bullets #15–18: "Hang Up on the Hang Low", by Brian Azzarello and Eduardo Risso (DC/Vertigo)
- 2002 The Amazing Spider-Man #30–35: "Coming Home", by J. Michael Straczynski, John Romita, Jr., and Scott Hanna (Marvel)
- 2003 Fables #1–5: "Legends in Exile", by Bill Willingham, Lan Medina, and Steve Leialoha (DC/Vertigo)
- 2004 Gotham Central #6–10: "Half a Life", by Greg Rucka and Michael Lark (DC)
- 2005 Fables #19–27: "March of the Wooden Soldiers," by Bill Willingham, Mark Buckingham, and Steve Leialoha (Vertigo/DC)
- 2006 Fables #36–38, 40–41: "Return to the Homelands," by Bill Willingham, Mark Buckingham, and Steve Leialoha (Vertigo/DC)

=== Best Black-and-White Series ===
- 1988 Concrete, by Paul Chadwick (Dark Horse)
- 1989 Concrete, by Paul Chadwick (Dark Horse)
- 1991 Xenozoic Tales, by Mark Schultz (Kitchen Sink)

=== Best Continuing Series ===
- 1988 Concrete, by Paul Chadwick (Dark Horse)
- 1989 Concrete, by Paul Chadwick (Dark Horse)
- 1991 Sandman, by Neil Gaiman and various artists (DC/Vertigo)
- 1992 Sandman, by Neil Gaiman and various artists (DC/Vertigo)
- 1993 Sandman, by Neil Gaiman and various artists (DC/Vertigo)
- 1994 Bone, by Jeff Smith (Cartoon Books)
- 1995 Bone, by Jeff Smith (Cartoon Books)
- 1996 Acme Novelty Library, by Chris Ware (Fantagraphics)
- 1997 Kurt Busiek's Astro City, Kurt Busiek, Brent Anderson, and Will Blyberg (Jukebox Productions/Homage)
- 1998 Kurt Busiek's Astro City, Kurt Busiek, Brent Anderson, and Will Blyberg (Jukebox Productions/Homage)
- 1999 Preacher, by Garth Ennis and Steve Dillon (DC/Vertigo)
- 2000 Acme Novelty Library, by Chris Ware (Fantagraphics)
- 2001 Top 10, by Alan Moore, Gene Ha, and Zander Cannon (ABC)
- 2002 100 Bullets, by Brian Azzarello and Eduardo Risso (DC/Vertigo)
- 2003 Daredevil, by Brian Michael Bendis and Alex Maleev (Marvel)
- 2004 100 Bullets, by Brian Azzarello and Eduardo Risso (DC/Vertigo)
- 2005 The Goon, by Eric Powell (Dark Horse)
- 2006 Astonishing X-Men, by Joss Whedon and John Cassaday (Marvel)
- 2007 All-Star Superman, by Grant Morrison and Frank Quitely (DC)
- 2008 Y: The Last Man, by Brian K. Vaughan, Pia Guerra, and Jose Marzan, Jr. (DC/Vertigo)
- 2009 All-Star Superman, by Grant Morrison and Frank Quitely (DC)
- 2010 The Walking Dead, by Robert Kirkman and Charles Adlard (Image)
- 2011 Chew (Just Desserts and Flambé), by John Layman and Rob Guillory (Image)
- 2012 Daredevil, by Mark Waid, Marcos Martin, Paolo Rivera, and Joe Rivera (Marvel)
- 2013 Saga, by Brian K. Vaughan and Fiona Staples (Image)
- 2014 Saga, by Brian K. Vaughan and Fiona Staples (Image)
- 2015 Saga, by Brian K. Vaughan and Fiona Staples (Image)
- 2016 Southern Bastards, by Jason Aaron and Jason Latour (Image)
- 2017 Saga, by Brian K. Vaughan and Fiona Staples (Image)
- 2018 Monstress, by Marjorie Liu and Sana Takeda (Image)
- 2019 Giant Days, by John Allison, Max Sarin and Julia Madrigal (BOOM! Box)
- 2020 Bitter Root, by David Walker, Chuck Brown and Sanford Greene (Image)
- 2021 Usagi Yojimbo, by Stan Sakai (IDW)
- 2022 (tie)
  - Bitter Root, by David F. Walker, Chuck Brown, and Sanford Greene (Image);
  - Something Is Killing the Children, by James Tynion IV and Werther Dell’Edera (BOOM! Studios)
- 2023 Nightwing, by Tom Taylor and Bruno Redondo (DC)
- 2024 Transformers, by Daniel Warren Johnson (Image Skybound)
- 2025 Santos Sisters by Greg & Fake, Graham Smith, Dave Landsberger, and Marc Koprinarov (Floating World)
- 2026 Absolute Batman, by Scott Snyder, Nick Dragotta, and others (DC)

=== Best Finite Series/Limited Series ===
- 1988 Watchmen, by Alan Moore and Dave Gibbons (DC)
- 1989 Silver Surfer, by Stan Lee and Jean "Moebius" Giraud (Marvel)
- 1991 Give Me Liberty, by Frank Miller and Dave Gibbons (Dark Horse)
- 1992 Concrete: Fragile Creature, by Paul Chadwick (Dark Horse)
- 1993 Grendel: War Child, by Matt Wagner and Patrick McEown (Dark Horse)
- 1994 Marvels, by Kurt Busiek and Alex Ross (Marvel)
- 1995 Sin City: A Dame to Kill For, by Frank Miller (Dark Horse/Legend)
- 1996 Sin City: The Big Fat Kill, by Frank Miller (Dark Horse/Legend)
- 1997 Kingdom Come, Mark Waid and Alex Ross (DC)
- 1998 Batman: The Long Halloween, Jeph Loeb and Tim Sale (DC)
- 1999 300, by Frank Miller and Lynn Varley (Dark Horse)
- 2000 Whiteout: Melt, by Greg Rucka and Steve Lieber (Oni)
- 2001 Der Ring des Nibelungen (The Ring of the Nibelung), by P. Craig Russell, with Patrick Mason (Dark Horse/Maverick)
- 2002 Hellboy: Conqueror Worm, by Mike Mignola (Dark Horse/Maverick)
- 2003 The League of Extraordinary Gentlemen, Volume II, by Alan Moore and Kevin O'Neill (ABC)
- 2004 Fantastic Four: Unstable Molecules, by James Sturm and Guy Davis (Marvel)
- 2005 DC: The New Frontier, by Darwyn Cooke (DC)
- 2006 Seven Soldiers, by Grant Morrison and various artists (DC)
- 2007 Batman: Year 100, by Paul Pope (DC)
- 2008 The Umbrella Academy: Apocalypse Suite by Gerard Way and Gabriel Bá (Dark Horse)
- 2009 Hellboy: The Crooked Man, by Mike Mignola and Richard Corben (Dark Horse)

=== Best Limited Series or Story Arc ===
- 2010 The Wonderful Wizard of Oz, by Eric Shanower and Skottie Young (Marvel)
- 2011 Daytripper, by Fábio Moon, Gabriel Bá (Vertigo/DC)
- 2012 Criminal: The Last of the Innocent, by Ed Brubaker and Sean Phillips (Marvel Icon)
- 2013 No award given
- 2014 The Wake, by Scott Snyder and Sean Murphy (Vertigo/DC)
- 2015 Little Nemo: Return to Slumberland, by Eric Shanower and Gabriel Rodriguez (IDW)
- 2016 The Fade Out, by Ed Brubaker and Sean Phillips (Image)
- 2017 The Vision, by Tom King and Gabriel Hernández Walta (Marvel)
- 2018 Black Panther: World of Wakanda, by Roxane Gay, Ta-Nehisi Coates, and Alitha E. Martinez (Marvel)
- 2019 Mister Miracle, by Tom King and Mitch Gerads (DC)
- 2020 Little Bird by Darcy Van Poelgeest and Ian Bertram (Image)
- 2021 Superman's Pal Jimmy Olsen, by Matt Fraction and Steve Lieber (DC)
- 2022 The Good Asian, by Pornsak Pichetshote and Alexandre Tefenkgi (Image)
- 2023 The Human Target, by Tom King and Greg Smallwood (DC)
- 2024 PeePee PooPoo, by Caroline Cash (Silver Sprocket)
- 2025 Zatanna: Bring Down the House by Mariko Tamaki and Javier Rodriguez (DC)
- 2026 Absolute Martian Manhunter, by Deniz Camp and Javier Rodriguez (DC)

=== Best New Series ===
- 1988 Concrete, by Paul Chadwick (Dark Horse)
- 1989 Kings In Disguise, by James Vance and Dan Burr (Kitchen Sink)
- 1995 Too Much Coffee Man, by Shannon Wheeler (Adhesive)
- 1996 Kurt Busiek's Astro City, by Kurt Busiek and Brent Anderson (Jukebox Productions/Image Comics|Image)
- 1997 Leave It to Chance, by James Robinson and Paul Smith (Homage)
- 1998 Castle Waiting, by Linda Medley (Olio)
- 1999 Inhumans, by Paul Jenkins and Jae Lee (Marvel)
- 2000 Top 10, by Alan Moore, Gene Ha, and Zander Cannon (ABC)
- 2001 Powers, by Brian Michael Bendis and Michael Avon Oeming (Image)
- 2002 Queen & Country, by Greg Rucka and Steve Rolston (Oni)
- 2003 Fables, by Bill Willingham, Lan Medina, Mark Buckingham, and Steve Leialoha (DC/Vertigo)
- 2004 Plastic Man, by Kyle Baker (DC)
- 2005 Ex Machina, by Brian K. Vaughan, Tony Harris, and Tom Feister (WildStorm/DC)
- 2006 All-Star Superman, by Grant Morrison and Frank Quitely (DC)
- 2007 Criminal, by Ed Brubaker and Sean Phillips (Marvel Icon)
- 2008 Buffy the Vampire Slayer Season Eight, by Joss Whedon, Brian K. Vaughan, Georges Jeanty, and Andy Owens (Dark Horse)
- 2009 The Invincible Iron Man, by Matt Fraction and Salvador Larroca (Marvel)
- 2010 Chew (Taster's Choice and International Flavor), by John Layman and Rob Guillory (Image)
- 2011 American Vampire, by Scott Snyder, Stephen King, Rafael Albuquerque (Vertigo/DC)
- 2013 Saga, by Brian K. Vaughan and Fiona Staples (Image)
- 2014 Sex Criminals (One Weird Trick), by Matt Fraction and Chip Zdarsky (Image)
- 2015 Lumberjanes, by Shannon Watters, Grace Ellis, ND Stevenson, and Gus Allen (BOOM! Box)
- 2016 Paper Girls, by Brian K. Vaughan and Cliff Chiang (Image)
- 2017 Black Hammer, by Jeff Lemire and Dean Ormston (Dark Horse)
- 2018 Black Bolt, by Saladin Ahmed and Christian Ward (Marvel)
- 2019 Gideon Falls, by Jeff Lemire and Andrea Sorrentino (Image)
- 2020 Invisible Kingdom, by G. Willow Wilson and Christian Ward (Berger Books/Dark Horse)
- 2021 Black Widow, by Kelly Thompson and Elena Casagrande (Marvel)
- 2022 The Nice House on the Lake, by James Tynion IV and Álvaro Martínez Bueno (DC Black Label)
- 2023 Public Domain, by Chip Zdarsky (Image)
- 2024 Somna: A Bedtime Story, by Becky Cloonan and Tula Lotay (DSTLRY)
- 2025 Absolute Wonder Woman, by Kelly Thompson and Hayden Sherman (DC)
- 2026 Assorted Crisis Events, by Deniz Camp and Eric Zawadski (Image)

=== Best Title for Younger Readers/Best Comics Publication for a Younger Audience ===
- 1996 Batman and Robin Adventures, by Paul Dini, Ty Templeton, and Rick Burchett (DC)
- 1997 Leave It to Chance, James Robinson and Paul Smith (Homage)
- 1998 Batman & Robin Adventures, Ty Templeton, Brandon Kruse, Rick Burchett, and others (DC)
- 1999 Batman: The Gotham Adventures, by Ty Templeton, Rick Burchett, and Terry Beatty (DC)
- 2000 Simpsons Comics, by various (Bongo)
- 2001 Scary Godmother: The Boo Flu, by Jill Thompson (Sirius)
- 2002 Herobear and the Kid, by Mike Kunkel (Astonish)
- 2003 Herobear and the Kid, by Mike Kunkel (Astonish)
- 2004 Walt Disney's Uncle Scrooge, by various (Gemstone)
- 2005 Plastic Man, by Kyle Baker and Scott Morse (DC)
- 2006 Owly: Flying Lessons, by Andy Runton (Top Shelf)
- 2007 Gumby, by Bob Burden and Rick Geary (Wildcard Ink)

=== Best Publication for Kids ===
- 2008 Mouse Guard: Fall 1152 and Mouse Guard: Winter 1152, by David Petersen (Archaia)
- 2009 Tiny Titans, by Art Baltazar and Franco Aureliani (DC)
- 2010 The Wonderful Wizard of Oz hardcover, by L. Frank Baum, Eric Shanower, and Skottie Young (Marvel)
- 2011 Tiny Titans, by Art Baltazar and Franco Aureliani (DC)

=== Best Publication for Early Readers ===
- 2012 Dragon Puncher Island, by James Kochalka (Top Shelf)
- 2013 Babymouse for President, by Jennifer L. Holm and Matthew Holm (Random House)
- 2014 Itty Bitty Hellboy, by Art Baltazar and Franco Aureliani (Dark Horse)
- 2015 The Zoo Box, by Ariel Cohn and Aron Nels Steinke (First Second)
- 2016 Little Robot, by Ben Hatke (First Second)
- 2017 Narwhal: Unicorn of the Sea, by Ben Clanton (Tundra)
- 2018 Good Night, Planet, by Liniers (Toon Books)
- 2019 Johnny Boo and the Ice Cream Computer, by James Kochalka (Top Shelf/IDW)
- 2020 Comics: Easy as ABC, by Ivan Brunetti (TOON)
- 2022 Chibi Usagi: Attack of the Heebie Chibis, by Julie and Stan Sakai (IDW)
- 2023 The Pigeon Will Ride the Roller Coaster! by Mo Willems (Union Square Kids)
- 2024 Bigfoot and Nessie: The Art of Getting Noticed, by Chelsea M. Campbell and Laura Knetzger (Penguin Workshop/Penguin Random House)
- 2025 Hilda and Twig Hide from the Rain by Luke Pearson (Flying Eye)
- 2026 All the Hulk Feels, by Dan Santat (Abrams Fanfare/Marvel)

=== Best Publication for Kids (ages 9–12) ===
- 2012 Snarked, by Roger Langridge (KaBOOM!)
- 2013 Adventure Time, by Ryan North, Shelli Paroline, and Braden Lamb (KaBOOM!)
- 2014 The Adventures of Superhero Girl, by Faith Erin Hicks (Dark Horse)
- 2015 El Deafo, by Cece Bell (Amulet/Abrams)
- 2016 Over the Garden Wall, by Pat McHale, Amalia Levari, and Jim Campbell (BOOM! Studios/ KaBOOM!)
- 2017 Ghosts, by Raina Telgemeier (Scholastic)
- 2018 The Tea Dragon Society, by Katie O’Neill (Oni)
- 2019 The Divided Earth, by Faith Erin Hicks (First Second)
- 2020 Guts, by Raina Telgemeier (Scholastic Graphix)
- 2022 Salt Magic, by Hope Larson and Rebecca Mock (Margaret Ferguson Books/Holiday House)
- 2023 Frizzy, by Claribel A. Ortega and Rose Bousamra (First Second/Macmillan)
- 2024 Mexikid: A Graphic Memoir, by Pedro Martín (Dial Books for Young Readers/Penguin Young Readers)
- 2025 Plain Jane and the Mermaid, by Vera Brosgol (First Second/Macmillan)
- 2026 The Cartoonists Club, by Raina Telgemeier and Scott McCloud (Scholastic Graphix)

=== Best Publication for Teens ===
- 2008 Laika, by Nick Abadzis (First Second)
- 2009 Coraline, by Neil Gaiman, adapted by P. Craig Russell (HarperCollins Children's Books)
- 2010 Beasts of Burden, by Evan Dorkin and Jill Thompson (Dark Horse)
- 2011 Smile by Raina Telgemeier (Scholastic/Graphix)
- 2012 Anya's Ghost, by Vera Brosgol (First Second)
- 2013 A Wrinkle in Time, by Madeleine L’Engle, adapted by Hope Larson (FSG)
- 2014 Battling Boy, by Paul Pope (First Second)
- 2015 Lumberjanes, by Shannon Watters, Grace Ellis, ND Stevenson, and Gus Allen (BOOM! Box)
- 2016 SuperMutant Magic Academy, by Jillian Tamaki (Drawn & Quarterly)
- 2017 The Unbeatable Squirrel Girl, by Ryan North and Erica Henderson (Marvel)
- 2018 Monstress, by Marjorie Liu and Sana Takeda (Image)
- 2019 The Prince and the Dressmaker, by Jen Wang (First Second)
- 2020 Laura Dean Keeps Breaking Up with Me, by Mariko Tamaki and Rosemary Valero-O'Connell (First Second/Macmillan)
- 2022 The Legend of Auntie Po, by Shing Yin Khor (Kokila/Penguin Random House)
- 2023 Do A Powerbomb!, by Daniel Warren Johnson (Image)
- 2024 Danger and Other Unknown Risks, by Ryan North and Erica Henderson (Penguin Workshop/Penguin Random House)
- 2025 Lunar New Year Love Story by Gene Luen Yang and LeUyen Pham (First Second/Macmillan)
- 2026 This Place Kills Me, by Mariko Tamaki and Nicole Goux (Abrams Fanfare)

=== Best Anthology ===
- 1992 Dark Horse Presents, edited by Randy Stradley (Dark Horse)
- 1993 Taboo, edited by Steve Bissette (SpiderBaby Graphix/Tundra)
- 1994 Dark Horse Presents, edited by Randy Stradley (Dark Horse)
- 1995 The Big Book of Urban Legends, edited by Andy Helfer (Paradox Press)
- 1996 The Big Book of Conspiracies, edited by Bronwyn Taggart (Paradox Press)
- 1997 Batman: Black and White, edited by Mark Chiarello and Scott Peterson (DC)
- 1998 Hellboy Christmas Special, edited by Scott Allie (Dark Horse)
- 1999 Grendel: Black, White, and Red, by Matt Wagner; ed. by Diana Schutz (Dark Horse)
- 2000 Tomorrow Stories, by Alan Moore, Rick Veitch, Kevin Nowlan, Melinda Gebbie, and Jim Baikie (ABC)
- 2001 Drawn & Quarterly, vol. 3, edited by Chris Oliveros (Drawn & Quarterly)
- 2002 Bizarro Comics, edited by Joey Cavalieri (DC)
- 2003 SPX 2002 (CBLDF)
- 2004 The Sandman: Endless Nights, by Neil Gaiman, Dave McKean, P. Craig Russell, Miguelanxo Prado, Barron Storey, Frank Quitely, Glenn Fabry, Milo Manara, and Bill Sienkiewicz; co-edited by Karen Berger and Shelly Bond (Vertigo/DC)
- 2005 Michael Chabon Presents The Amazing Adventures of the Escapist, edited by Diana Schutz and David Land (Dark Horse)
- 2006 Solo, edited by Mark Chiarello (DC)
- 2007 Fables: 1001 Nights of Snowfall, by Bill Willingham and various (Vertigo/DC)
- 2008 5, by Gabriel Bá, Becky Cloonan, Fábio Moon, Vasilis Lolos, and Rafael Grampa (self-published)
- 2009 Comic Book Tattoo: Narrative Art Inspired by the Lyrics and Music of Tori Amos, edited by Rantz Hoseley (Image)
- 2010 Popgun Volume 3, edited by Mark Andrew Smith, DJ Kirkbride, and Joe Keatinge (Image)
- 2011 Mouse Guard: Legends of the Guard, edited by Paul Morrissey and David Petersen (based on Mouse Guard)
- 2012 Dark Horse Presents, edited by Mike Richardson (Dark Horse)
- 2013 Dark Horse Presents, edited by Mike Richardson (Dark Horse)
- 2014 Dark Horse Presents, edited by Mike Richardson (Dark Horse)
- 2015 Little Nemo: Dream Another Dream, edited by Josh O'Neill, Andrew Carl, and Chris Stevens (Locust Moon) (based on the newspaper strip Little Nemo by Winsor McCay)
- 2016 Drawn & Quarterly, Twenty-Five Years of Contemporary, Cartooning, Comics, and Graphic Novels, edited by Tom Devlin (Drawn & Quarterly)
- 2017 Love is Love, edited by Marc Andreyko (IDW/DC)
- 2018 Elements: Fire – A Comic Anthology by Creators of Color!, edited by Taneka Stotts (Beyond Press)
- 2019 Puerto Rico Strong, edited by Marco Lopez, Desiree Rodriguez, Hazel Newlevant, Derek Ruiz and Neil Schwartz (Lion Forge)
- 2020 Drawing Power: Women's Stories of Sexual Violence, Harassment, and Survival, edited by Diane Noomin (Abrams)
- 2021 Menopause: A Comic Treatment, edited by MK Czerwiec (Graphic Medicine/Pennsylvania State University Press)
- 2022 You Died: An Anthology of the Afterlife, edited by Kel McDonald and Andrea Purcell (Iron Circus)
- 2023 The Nib Magazine, edited by Matt Bors (Nib)
- 2024 Comics for Ukraine, edited by Scott Dunbier (Zoop)
- 2025 Godzilla’s 70th Anniversary edited by Jake Williams and others (IDW)
- 2026 DC Pride 2025, edited by Andrea Shea and Jillian Grant (DC)

=== Best Digital Comic ===
- 2005 Mom's Cancer by Brian Fies
- 2006 PvP by Scott Kurtz
- 2007 Sam & Max: The Big Sleep by Steve Purcell
- 2008 Sugarshock!, by Joss Whedon and Fabio Moon
- 2009 Finder, by Carla Speed McNeil
- 2010 Sin Titulo, by Cameron Stewart
- 2011 The Abominable Charles Christopher, by Karl Kerschl
- 2012 Battlepug, by Mike Norton
- 2013 Bandette, by Paul Tobin and Colleen Coover
- 2014 The Oatmeal, by Matthew Inman
- 2015 The Private Eye, by Brian K. Vaughan and Marcos Martin
- 2016 Bandette, by Paul Tobin and Colleen Coover (Monkeybrain/ comicXology)
- 2017 Bandette, by Paul Tobin and Colleen Coover
- 2018 Harvey Kurtzman's Marley's Ghost, by Harvey Kurtzman, Josh O'Neill, Shannon Wheeler, and Gideon Kendall (comiXology Originals/Kitchen, Lind & Associates)
- 2019 Umami, by Ken Niimura (Panel Syndicate)
- 2020 Afterlift, by Chip Zdarsky and Jason Loo (comiXology Originals)
- 2021 Friday, by Ed Brubaker and Marcos Martin (Panel Syndicate)
- 2022 Snow Angels, by Jeff Lemire and Jock (comiXology Originals)
- 2023 Barnstormers, by Scott Snyder and Tula Lotay (comiXology Originals)
- 2024 Friday, by Ed Brubaker and Marcos Martin, vols. 7–8 (Panel Syndicate)
- 2025 My Journey to Her, by Yuna Hirasawa (Kodansha)
- 2026 Practical Defense Against Piracy, by Tony Cliff (delilahdirk.com)

=== Best Webcomic ===
- 2017 Bird Boy, by Anne Szabla (bird-boy.com)
- 2018 The Tea Dragon Society, by Katie O’Neill (teadragonsociety.com)
- 2019 The Contradictions, by Sophie Yanow (thecontradictions.com)
- 2020 Fried Rice, by Erica Eng (friedricecomic.tumblr.com)
- 2021 Crisis Zone, by Simon Hanselmann, (instagram.com/simon.hanselmann)
- 2022 Lore Olympus, by Rachel Smythe (WEBTOON)
- 2023 Lore Olympus, by Rachel Smythe (WEBTOON)
- 2024 Lore Olympus by Rachel Smythe (WEBTOON)
- 2025 Life After Life by Joshua Barkman (False Knees)
- 2026 Tiger, Tiger by Petra Erika Nordlund (tigertigercomic.com)

=== Best Reality-Based Work ===
- 2006 Nat Turner, by Kyle Baker (Kyle Baker Publishing)
- 2007 Fun Home, by Alison Bechdel (Houghton Mifflin)
- 2008 Satchel Paige: Striking Out Jim Crow, by James Sturm and Rich Tommaso (Center for Cartoon Studies/Hyperion)
- 2009 What It Is, by Lynda Barry (Drawn & Quarterly)
- 2010 A Drifting Life, by Yoshihiro Tatsumi (Drawn & Quarterly)
- 2011 It Was the War of the Trenches, by Jacques Tardi
- 2012 Green River Killer: A True Detective Story, by Jeff Jensen and Jonathan Case (Dark Horse Books)
- 2013 (tie)
  - Annie Sullivan and the Trials of Helen Keller, by Joseph Lambert (Center for Cartoon Studies/Disney Hyperion)
  - The Carter Family: Don't Forget This Song, by Frank M. Young and David Lasky (Abrams ComicArts)
- 2014 The Fifth Beatle: The Brian Epstein Story, by Vivek J. Tiwary, Andrew C. Robinson, and Kyle Baker (M Press/Dark Horse)
- 2015 Hip Hop Family Tree Vol. 2, by Ed Piskor (Fantagraphics)
- 2016 March: Book Two, by John Lewis, Andrew Aydin, and Nate Powell (Top Shelf/IDW)
- 2017 March: Book Three, by John Lewis, Andrew Aydin, and Nate Powell (Top Shelf/IDW)
- 2018 Spinning, by Tillie Walden (First Second)
- 2019 Is This Guy For Real? The Unbelievable Andy Kaufman, by Box Brown (First Second)
- 2020 They Called Us Enemy, by George Takei, Justin Eisinger, Steven Scott and Harmony Becker (Top Shelf)
- 2021 Kent State: Four Dead in Ohio, by Derf Backderf (Abrams)
- 2022 The Black Panther Party: A Graphic History, by David F. Walker and Marcus Kwame Anderson (Ten Speed Press)
- 2023 Flung Out of Space, by Grace Ellis and Hannah Templer (Abrams ComicArts)
- 2024 Three Rocks: The Story of Ernie Bushmiller: The Man Who Created Nancy, by Bill Griffith (Abrams ComicArts)
- 2025 Suffrage Song: The Haunted History of Gender, Race, and Voting Rights in the U.S. by Caitlin Cass (Fantagraphics)
- 2026 Black Arms to Hold You Up: A History of Black Resistance, by Ben Passmore (Pantheon)

=== Best Graphic Memoir ===
- 2021 The Loneliness of the Long-Distance Cartoonist, by Adrian Tomine (Drawn & Quarterly)
- 2022 Run: Book One, by John Lewis, Andrew Aydin, L. Fury, and Nate Powell (Abrams ComicArts)
- 2023 Ducks: Two Years in the Oil Sands, by Kate Beaton (Drawn & Quarterly)
- 2024 Family Style: Memories of an American from Vietnam, by Thien Pham (First Second/Macmillan)
- 2025 Feeding Ghosts: A Graphic Memoir by Tessa Hulls (MCD/Farrar, Straus & Giroux)
- 2026 It Rhymes with Takei, by George Takei, Harmony Becker, Steven Scott, and Justin Eisinger (Top Shelf)

=== Best Graphic Album ===
- 1988 Watchmen, by Alan Moore and Dave Gibbons (DC)
- 1989 Batman: The Killing Joke, by Alan Moore and Brian Bolland (DC)

=== Best Graphic Album: New ===
- 1991 Elektra Lives Again, by Frank Miller and Lynn Varley (Marvel)
- 1992 To the Heart of the Storm, by Will Eisner (Kitchen Sink)
- 1993 Signal to Noise, by Neil Gaiman and Dave McKean (VG Graphics/Dark Horse)
- 1994 A Small Killing, by Alan Moore and Oscar Zarate (Dark Horse)
- 1995 Fairy Tales of Oscar Wilde Vol. 2, by P. Craig Russell (NBM)
- 1996 Stuck Rubber Baby, by Howard Cruse (Paradox Press)
- 1997 Fax from Sarajevo, by Joe Kubert (Dark Horse Books)
- 1998 Batman & Superman Adventures: World's Finest, by Paul Dini, Joe Staton, and Terry Beatty (DC)
- 1999 Superman: Peace on Earth, by Paul Dini and Alex Ross (DC)
- 2000 Acme Novelty Library #13, by Chris Ware (Fantagraphics)
- 2001 Safe Area Goražde, by Joe Sacco
- 2002 The Name of the Game, by Will Eisner (DC)
- 2003 One! Hundred! Demons! by Lynda Barry (Sasquatch Books)
- 2004 Blankets, by Craig Thompson (Top Shelf)
- 2005 The Originals, by Dave Gibbons (Vertigo/DC)
- 2006 Top 10: The Forty-Niners, by Alan Moore and Gene Ha (ABC)
- 2007 American Born Chinese, by Gene Luen Yang (First Second)
- 2008 Exit Wounds, by Rutu Modan (Drawn & Quarterly)
- 2009 Swallow Me Whole, by Nate Powell (Top Shelf)
- 2010 Asterios Polyp, by David Mazzucchelli (Pantheon)
- 2011 (tie)
  - Wilson by Daniel Clowes (Drawn & Quarterly)
  - Return of the Dapper Men by Jim McCann and Janet Lee (Archaia)
- 2012 Jim Henson's Tale of Sand, adapted by Ramon K. Perez (Archaia)
- 2013 Building Stories, by Chris Ware (Pantheon)
- 2014 The Property, by Rutu Modan (Drawn & Quarterly)
- 2015 This One Summer, by Mariko Tamaki & Jillian Tamaki (First Second)
- 2016 Ruins by Peter Kuper (SelfMadeHero)
- 2017 Wonder Woman: The True Amazon by Jill Thompson (DC Comics)
- 2018 My Favorite Thing Is Monsters by Emil Ferris (Fantagraphics)
- 2019 My Heroes Have Always Been Junkies, by Ed Brubaker and Sean Phillips (Image)
- 2020 Are You Listening?, by Tillie Walden (First Second/Macmillan)
- 2021 Pulp, by Ed Brubaker and Sean Phillips (Image)
- 2022 Monsters, by Barry Windsor-Smith (Fantagraphics)
- 2023 The Night Eaters, Book 1: She Eats the Night, by Marjorie Liu and Sana Takeda (Abrams ComicArts)
- 2024 Roaming, by Mariko Tamaki and Jillian Tamaki (Drawn & Quarterly)
- 2025 Lunar New Year Love Story by Gene Luen Yang and LeUyen Pham (First Second/Macmillan)
- 2026 Drome, by Jesse Lonergan (23^{rd} St. Books)

=== Best Graphic Album: Reprint ===
- 1991 Sandman: The Doll's House by Neil Gaiman and various artists (DC)
- 1992 Maus II by Art Spiegelman (Pantheon Books)
- 1993 Sin City by Frank Miller (Dark Horse)
- 1994 Cerebus: Flight by Dave Sim and Gerhard (Aardvark-Vanaheim)
- 1995 Hellboy: Seed of Destruction by Mike Mignola (Dark Horse)
- 1996 The Tale of One Bad Rat by Bryan Talbot (Dark Horse)
- 1997 Stray Bullets: Innocence of Nihilism by David Lapham (El Capitan)
- 1998 Sin City: That Yellow Bastard by Frank Miller (Dark Horse)
- 1999 Batman: The Long Halloween by Jeph Loeb and Tim Sale (DC)
- 2000 From Hell by Alan Moore and Eddie Campbell (Eddie Campbell Comics)
- 2001 Jimmy Corrigan, the Smartest Kid on Earth by Chris Ware (Pantheon)
- 2002 Batman: Dark Victory by Jeph Loeb and Tim Sale (DC)
- 2003 Batman: Black and White vol. 2, edited by Mark Chiarello and Nick J. Napolitano (DC)
- 2004 Batman Adventures: Dangerous Dames and Demons, by Paul Dini, Bruce Timm, and others (DC)
- 2005 Bone One Volume Edition, by Jeff Smith (Cartoon Books)
- 2006 Black Hole, by Charles Burns (Pantheon)
- 2007 Absolute DC: The New Frontier, by Darwyn Cooke (DC)
- 2008 Mouse Guard: Fall 1152, by David Petersen (Archaia)
- 2009 Hellboy Library Edition, vols. 1 and 2, by Mike Mignola (Dark Horse)
- 2010 Absolute Justice, by Alex Ross, Jim Krueger, and Doug Braithewaite (DC)
- 2011 Wednesday Comics, edited by Mark Chiarello (DC)
- 2012 Richard Stark's Parker: The Martini Edition, by Darwyn Cooke (IDW)
- 2013 King City, by Brandon Graham (TokyoPop/Image)
- 2014 RASL, by Jeff Smith (Cartoon Books)
- 2015 Through the Woods, by Emily Carroll (McElderry Books)
- 2016 Nimona, by ND Stevenson (Harper Teen)
- 2017 Demon, by Jason Shiga (First Second)
- 2018 Boundless, by Jillian Tamaki (Drawn & Quarterly)
- 2019 The Vision hardcover, by Tom King, Gabriel Hernandez Walta and Michael Walsh (Marvel)
- 2020 LaGuardia, by Nnedi Okorafor and Tana Ford (Berger Books/Dark Horse)
- 2021 Seeds and Stems, by Simon Hanselmann (Fantagraphics)
- 2022 The Complete American Gods, by Neil Gaiman, P. Craig Russell, and Scott Hampton (Dark Horse)
- 2023 Parker: The Martini Edition—Last Call, by Richard Stark, Darwyn Cooke, Ed Brubaker, and Sean Phillips (IDW)
- 2024 (tie)
  - Hip Hop Family Tree: The Omnibus, by Ed Piskor (Fantagraphics)
  - Wonder Woman Historia: The Amazons, by Kelly Sue DeConnick, Phil Jimenez, Gene Ha, and Nicola Scott (DC)
- 2025 The One Hand and The Six Fingers by Ram V, Dan Watters, Laurence Campbell, and Sumit Kumar (Image)
- 2026 Superman’s Pal, Jimmy Olsen: The Deluxe Edition, by Matt Fraction and Steve Lieber (DC)

=== Best Archival Collection/Project ===
- 1993 Carl Barks Library album series (Gladstone)
- 1994 The Complete Little Nemo in Slumberland by Winsor McCay (Fantagraphics)
- 1995 The Christmas Spirit by Will Eisner (Kitchen Sink)
- 1996 The Complete Crumb Comics Vol. 11 by R. Crumb (Fantagraphics)
- 1997 Tarzan: The Land That Time Forgot and The Pool of Time by Russ Manning (Dark Horse)
- 1998 Jack Kirby's New Gods by Jack Kirby (DC)
- 1999 Plastic Man Archives vol. 1 by Jack Cole (DC)
- 2000 Peanuts: A Golden Celebration (HarperCollins)
- 2001 The Spirit Archives vols. 1 and 2 by Will Eisner (DC)
- 2002 Akira by Katsuhiro Otomo (Dark Horse)
- 2003 Krazy & Ignatz by George Herriman (Fantagraphics)
- 2004 Krazy and Ignatz, 1929–1930, by George Herriman, edited by Bill Blackbeard (Fantagraphics)
- 2005 The Complete Peanuts, edited by Gary Groth (Fantagraphics)

=== Best Archival Collection/Project—Strips (at least 20 years old) ===
- 2006 The Complete Calvin and Hobbes by Bill Watterson (Andrews McMeel)
- 2007 The Complete Peanuts, 1959–1960, 1961-1962, by Charles Schulz (Fantagraphics)
- 2008 The Complete Terry and the Pirates, vol. 1, by Milton Caniff (The Library of American Comics)
- 2009 Little Nemo in Slumberland, Many More Splendid Sundays, by Winsor McCay (Sunday Press Books)
- 2010 Bloom County: The Complete Library, vol. 1, by Berkeley Breathed, edited by Scott Dunbier (The Library of American Comics)
- 2011 Archie: Complete Daily Newspaper Comics, edited by Greg Goldstein (The Library of American Comics)
- 2012 Walt Disney's Mickey Mouse, vols. 1–2, by Floyd Gottfredson, edited by David Gerstein and Gary Groth (Fantagraphics)
- 2013 Pogo, vol. 2: Bona Fide Balderdash, by Walt Kelly, edited by Carolyn Kelly and Kim Thompson (Fantagraphics)
- 2014 Tarzan: The Complete Russ Manning Newspaper Strips, vol. 1, edited by Dean Mullaney (The Library of American Comics)
- 2015 Winsor McCay’s Complete Little Nemo, edited by Alexander Braun (TASCHEN)
- 2016 The Eternaut, by Héctor Germán Oesterheld and Francisco Solano López, translated by Erica Mena, edited by Gary Groth and Kristy Valenti (Fantagraphics)
- 2017 Chester Gould's Dick Tracy, Colorful Cases of the 1930s, edited by Peter Maresca (Sunday Press)
- 2018 Celebrating Snoopy, by Charles M. Schulz, edited by Alexis E. Fajardo and Dorothy O'Brien (Andrews McMeel)
- 2019 Star Wars: Classic Newspaper Strips, vol. 3, by Archie Goodwin and Al Williamson, edited by Dean Mullaney (Marvel)
- 2020 Krazy Kat: The Complete Color Sundays, by George Herriman, edited by Alexander Braun (TASCHEN)
- 2021 The Flapper Queens: Women Cartoonists of the Jazz Age, edited by Trina Robbins (Fantagraphics)
- 2022 Popeye: The E.C. Segar Sundays, vol. 1 by E.C. Segar, edited by Gary Groth and Conrad Groth (Fantagraphics)
- 2023 Come Over Come Over. It's So Magic, and My Perfect Life, by Lynda Barry (Drawn & Quarterly)
- 2024 Dauntless Dames: High-Heeled Heroes of the Comic Strips, edited by Peter Maresca and Trina Robbins (Fantagraphics)
- 2025 Thorn: The Complete Proto-BONE Strips 1982–1986, and Other Early Drawings by Jeff Smith (Cartoon Books)
- 2026 The George Herriman Library: Krazy & Ignatz 1928–1930, edited by J. Michael Catron and Bill Blackbeard (Fantagraphics)

=== Best Archival Collection/Project—Comic Books ===
- 2006 Absolute Watchmen by Alan Moore and Dave Gibbons (DC)
- 2007 Absolute Sandman, vol. 1, by Neil Gaiman and various (Vertigo/DC)
- 2008 I Shall Destroy All the Civilized Planets! by Fletcher Hanks (Fantagraphics)
- 2009 Creepy Archives, by various (Dark Horse)
- 2010 The Rocketeer: The Complete Adventures deluxe edition, by Dave Stevens, edited by Scott Dunbier (IDW)
- 2011 Dave Stevens' The Rocketeer: Artist's Edition, IDW Publishing
- 2012 Walt Simonson's The Mighty Thor: Artist's Edition, (Marvel)
- 2013 David Mazzucchelli's Daredevil Born Again: Artist's Edition, edited by Scott Dunbier (Marvel)
- 2014 Will Eisner's The Spirit Artist's Edition, edited by Scott Dunbier (IDW)
- 2015 Steranko Nick Fury Agent of S.H.I.E.L.D. Artist's Edition, edited by Scott Dunbier (Marvel)
- 2016 Walt Kelly's Fairy Tales, edited by Craig Yoe (IDW)
- 2017 The Complete Wimmen's Comix, edited by Trina Robbins, Gary Groth, and J. Michael Catron (Fantagraphics)
- 2018 Akira 35th Anniversary Edition, by Katsuhiro Otomo, edited by Haruko Hashimoto, Ajani Oloye, and Lauren Scanlan (Kodansha)
- 2019 Bill Sienkiewicz's Mutants and Moon Knights... And Assassins... Artifact Edition, edited by Scott Dunbier (Marvel)
- 2020 Stan Sakai's Usagi Yojimbo: The Complete Grasscutter Artist Select, by Stan Sakai, edited by Scott Dunbier (IDW)
- 2021 The Complete Hate, by Peter Bagge, edited by Eric Reynolds (Fantagraphics)
- 2022 EC Covers Artist's Edition, edited by Scott Dunbier (IDW)
- 2023 The Fantastic Worlds of Frank Frazetta, edited by Dian Hanson (TASCHEN)
- 2024 All-Negro Comics 75th Anniversary Edition, edited by Chris Robinson (Very GOOD Books)
- 2025 David Mazzucchelli's Batman Year One Artist's Edition by Frank Miller and David Mazzucchelli, edited by Scott Dunbier (IDW)
- 2026 AKIRA Volumes 1–5 Hardcover Collection, by Katsuhiro Otomo, edited by Haruko Hashimoto, Ajani Oloye, and Lauren Scanlan (Kodansha USA Publishing)

=== Best Humor Publication ===
- 1992 Groo the Wanderer by Mark Evanier and Sergio Aragonés (Marvel/Epic)
- 1993 Bone by Jeff Smith (Cartoon Press)
- 1994 Bone by Jeff Smith (Cartoon Books)
- 1995 Bone by Jeff Smith (Cartoon Books)
- 1996 Milk & Cheese #666 by Evan Dorkin (Slave Labor)
- 1997 Sergio Aragonés Destroys DC (DC) and Sergio Aragonés Massacres Marvel (Marvel) by Mark Evanier and Sergio Aragonés
- 1998 Gon Swimmin' by Masashi Tanaka (Paradox Press)
- 1999 Sergio Aragonés Groo by Sergio Aragonés and Mark Evanier (Dark Horse)
- 2000 Bart Simpson's Treehouse of Horror by Jill Thompson/Oscar González Loyo/Steve Steere Jr., Scott Shaw!/Sergio Aragonés, and Doug TenNapel (Bongo)
- 2001 Sock Monkey, vol. 3 by Tony Millionaire (Dark Horse/Maverick)
- 2002 Radioactive Man by Batton Lash, Abel Laxamana, Dan DeCarlo, Mike DeCarlo, and Bob Smith (Bongo)
- 2003 The Amazing Screw-On Head by Mike Mignola (Dark Horse)
- 2004 Formerly Known as the Justice League, by Keith Giffen, J. M. DeMatteis, Kevin Maguire, and Josef Rubinstein (DC)
- 2005 The Goon by Eric Powell
- 2007 Flaming Carrot Comics, by Bob Burden (Desperado/Image)
- 2008 Perry Bible Fellowship: The Trial of Colonel Sweeto and Other Stories, by Nicholas Gurewitch (Dark Horse)
- 2009 Herbie Archives, by "Shane O'Shea" (Richard E. Hughes) and Ogden Whitney (Dark Horse)
- 2010 Scott Pilgrim vol. 5: Scott Pilgrim vs. the Universe, by Bryan Lee O'Malley (Oni)
- 2011 I Thought You Would Be Funnier by Shannon Wheeler (BOOM! Studios)
- 2012 Milk & Cheese: Dairy Products Gone Bad, by Evan Dorkin (Dark Horse Books)
- 2013 Darth Vader and Son, by Jeffrey Brown (Chronicle)
- 2014 Vader's Little Princess, by Jeffrey Brown (Chronicle)
- 2015 The Complete Cul de Sac, by Richard Thompson (Andrews McMeel)
- 2016 Step Aside, Pops: A Hark! A Vagrant Collection, by Kate Beaton (Drawn & Quarterly)
- 2017 Jughead, by Chip Zdarsky, Ryan North, Erica Henderson and Derek Charm (Archie)
- 2018 Baking with Kafka by Tom Gauld (Drawn & Quarterly)
- 2019 Giant Days, by John Allison, Max Sarin and Julia Madrigal (BOOM! Box)
- 2020 The Way of the Househusband, vol. 1, by Kousuke Oono, translation by Sheldon Drzka (VIZ Media)
- 2021 Superman's Pal Jimmy Olsen, by Matt Fraction and Steve Lieber (DC)
- 2022 Not All Robots, by Mark Russell and Mike Deodato Jr. (AWA Upshot)
- 2023 Revenge of the Librarians, by Tom Gauld (Drawn & Quarterly)
- 2024 It's Jeff: The Jeff-Verse #1, by Kelly Thompson and Gurihiru (Marvel)
- 2025 Processing: 100 Comics That Got Me Through It by Tara Booth (Drawn & Quarterly)
- 2026 Physics for Cats, by Tom Gauld (Drawn & Quarterly)

=== Best Adaptation from Another Medium ===
- 2010 Richard Stark's Parker: The Hunter, adapted by Darwyn Cooke (IDW)
- 2011 The Marvelous Land of Oz, adapted by Eric Shanower, Skottie Young (Marvel)
- 2013 Richard Stark's Parker: The Score, adapted by Darwyn Cooke (IDW)
- 2014 Richard Stark's Parker: Slayground, by Donald Westlake, adapted by Darwyn Cooke (IDW)
- 2015 No nominations
- 2016 Two Brothers, by Fábio Moon and Gabriel Bá (Dark Horse)
- 2017 No nominations
- 2018 Kindred, by Octavia Butler, adapted by Damian Duffy and John Jennings (Abrams ComicArts)
- 2019 Frankenstein by Mary Shelley, in Frankenstein: Junji Ito Story Collection, adapted by Junji Ito, translated by Jocelyne Allen (VIZ Media)
- 2020 Snow, Glass, Apples, by Neil Gaiman and Colleen Doran (Dark Horse Books)
- 2021 Superman Smashes the Klan, adapted by Gene Luen Yang and Gurihiru (DC)
- 2022 George Orwell's 1984: The Graphic Novel, adapted by Fido Nesti (Mariner Books)
- 2023 Chivalry by Neil Gaiman, adapted by Colleen Doran (Dark Horse)
- 2024 Watership Down, by Richard Adams, adapted by James Sturm and Joe Sutphin (Ten Speed Graphic)
- 2025 The Road by Cormac McCarthy, adapted by Manu Larcenet (Abrams)
- 2026 Lord of the Flies: The Graphic Novel, by William Golding, adapted by Aimée De Jongh (Penguin Classics)

=== Best U.S. Edition of International Material ===
- 1998 Gon Swimmin' by Masashi Tanaka (Paradox Press)
- 1999 Star Wars: A New Hope - Manga by Hisao Tamaki (Dark Horse)
- 2000 Blade of the Immortal by Hiroaki Samura (Dark Horse)
- 2001 Lone Wolf and Cub by Kazuo Koike and Goseki Kojima (Dark Horse)
- 2002 Akira by Katsuhiro Otomo (Dark Horse)
- 2003 Dr. Jekyll & Mr. Hyde by Robert Louis Stevenson, adapted by Jerry Kramsky and Lorenzo Mattotti (NBM)
- 2004 Buddha, vols. 1 and 2, by Osamu Tezuka (Vertical)
- 2005 Buddha, vols. 3–4 by Osamu Tezuka (Vertical)
- 2006 The Rabbi's Cat, by Joann Sfar (Pantheon)
- 2007 The Left Bank Gang, by Jason (Fantagraphics)
- 2008 I Killed Adolf Hitler, by Jason (Fantagraphics)
- 2009 The Last Musketeer, by Jason (Fantagraphics)
- 2010 The Photographer, by Emmanuel Guibert, Didier Lefèvre, and Frédéric Lemercier (First Second)
- 2011 It Was the War of the Trenches, by Jacques Tardi
- 2012 The Manara Library, vol. 1: Indian Summer and Other Stories, by Milo Manara with Hugo Pratt (Dark Horse Books)
- 2013 Blacksad: Silent Hell, by Juan Díaz Canales and Juanjo Guarnido (Dark Horse)
- 2014 Goddamn This War! by Jacques Tardi and Jean-Pierre Verney (Fantagraphics)
- 2015 Blacksad: Amarillo, by Juan Díaz Canales & Juanjo Guarnido (Dark Horse)
- 2016 The Realist, by Asaf Hanuka (BOOM! Studios/Archaia)
- 2017 Moebius Library: The World of Edena, by Jean "Moebius" Giraud et al. (Dark Horse)
- 2018 Run for It: Stories of Slaves Who Fought for the Freedom, by Marcelo D’Salete, translated by Andrea Rosenberg (Fantagraphics)
- 2019 Brazen: Rebel Ladies Who Rocked the World, by Pénélope Bagieu translated by Montana Kane (First Second)
- 2020 The House, by Paco Roca, translation by Andrea Rosenberg (Fantagraphics)
- 2021 Goblin Girl, by Moa Romanova, translation by Melissa Bowers (Fantagraphics)
- 2022 The Shadow of a Man, by Benoît Peeters and François Schuiten, translation by Stephen D. Smith (IDW)
- 2023 Blacksad: They All Fall Down Part 1, by Juan Díaz Canales and Juanjo Guarnido, translation by Diana Schutz and Brandon Kander (Dark Horse)
- 2024 Blacksad, Vol 7: They All Fall Down, Part 2, by Juan Díaz Canales and Juanjo Guarnido, translation by Diana Schutz and Brandon Kander (Europe Comics)
- 2025 The Jellyfish by Boum, translated by Robin Lang and Helge Dascher (Pow Pow Press)
- 2026 Nocturnos, by Laura Perez, translated by Andrea Rosenberg (Fantagraphics)

=== Best U.S. Edition of International Material — Japan ===
- 2007 Old Boy, by Garon Tsuchiya and Nobuaki Minegishi (Dark Horse Manga)
- 2008 Tekkonkinkreet: Black & White, by Taiyo Matsumoto (Viz)
- 2009 Dororo, by Osamu Tezuka (Vertical)

=== Best U.S. Edition of International Material—Asia ===
- 2010 A Drifting Life, by Yoshihiro Tatsumi (Drawn & Quarterly)
- 2011 20th Century Boys, by Naoki Urasawa
- 2012 Onward Towards Our Noble Deaths, by Shigeru Mizuki (Drawn & Quarterly)
- 2013 20th Century Boys, by Naoki Urasawa (Viz Media)
- 2014 The Mysterious Underground Men, by Osamu Tezuka (PictureBox)
- 2015 Showa 1939–1944 and Showa 1944–1953: A History of Japan, by Shigeru Mizuki (Drawn & Quarterly)
- 2016 Showa 1953–1989: A History of Japan, by Shigeru Mizuki (Drawn & Quarterly)
- 2017 The Art of Charlie Chan Hock Chye, by Sonny Liew (Pantheon)
- 2018 My Brother's Husband, vol. 1, by Gengoroh Tagame, translated by Anne Ishii (Pantheon)
- 2019 Tokyo Tarareba Girls, by Akiko Higashimura (Kodansha)
- 2020 (tie)
  - Cats of the Louvre, by Taiyō Matsumoto, translation by Michael Arias (VIZ Media)
  - Witch Hat Atelier, by Kamome Shirahama, translation by Stephen Kohler (Kodansha)
- 2021 Remina, by Junji Ito, translation by Jocelyne Allen (VIZ Media)
- 2022 Lovesickness: Junji Ito Story Collection, by Junji Ito, translation by Jocelyne Allen (VIZ Media)
- 2023 Shuna's Journey, by Hayao Miyazaki; translation by Alex Dudok de Wit (First Second/Macmillan)
- 2024 My Picture Diary, by Fujiwara Maki, translation by Ryan Holmberg (Drawn & Quarterly)
- 2025 Tokyo These Days, vols. 1–3 by Taiyo Matsumoto, translated by Michael Arias (VIZ Media)
- 2026 Purgatory Funeral Cakes, by Sanho, translated by Danny Lim (Dark Horse)

=== Best Comic Strip Collection ===
- 1992 Calvin and Hobbes: The Revenge of the Baby-Sat by Bill Watterson (Andrews and McMeel)
- 1993 Calvin and Hobbes: Attack of the Deranged Mutant Killer Monster Snow Goons by Bill Watterson (Andrews and McMeel)

=== Best Comics-Related Periodical/Journalism ===
In 2001, the judging panel chose to drop Best Comics-Related Periodical from the ballot; the category was restored in 2002.

- 1992 Comics Buyer's Guide (Krause)
- 1993 Comics Buyer's Guide (Krause Publications)
- 1995 Hero Illustrated (Warrior Publications)
- 1996 The Comics Journal (Fantagraphics)
- 1997 The Comics Journal (Fantagraphics)
- 1998 The Comics Journal (Fantagraphics)
- 1999 The Comics Journal (Fantagraphics)
- 2000 Comic Book Artist (TwoMorrows)
- 2002 Comic Book Artist (TwoMorrows)
- 2004 Comic Book Artist, edited by Jon B. Cooke (Top Shelf)
- 2005 Comic Book Artist, edited by Jon B. Cooke (Top Shelf)
- 2006 Comic Book Artist, edited by Jon B. Cooke (Top Shelf)
- 2007 Alter Ego, edited by Roy Thomas (TwoMorrows)
- 2008 Newsarama, produced by Matt Brady and Michael Doran
- 2009 Comic Book Resources, produced by Jonah Weiland
- 2010 The Comics Reporter, produced by Tom Spurgeon
- 2011 Comic Book Resources, www.cbr.com
- 2012 The Comics Reporter, produced by Tom Spurgeon, www.comicsreporter.com
- 2013 The Comics Reporter, edited by Tom Spurgeon, www.comicsreporter.com
- 2014 Comic Book Resources, www.cbr.com
- 2015 ComicsAlliance, edited by Andy Khouri, Caleb Goellner, Andrew Wheeler, and Joe Hughes, www.comicsalliance.com
- 2016 Hogan's Alley, edited by Tom Heintjes, cartoonician.com
- 2017 The A.V. Club comics coverage, (Comics Panel, Back Issues, and Big Issues, by Oliver Sava et al.), www.avclub.com
- 2018 The Comics Journal, edited by Dan Nadel, Timothy Hodler, and Tucker Stone, tcj.com (Fantagraphics)
- 2019 (tie)
  - Back Issue, edited by Michael Eury (TwoMorrows)
  - PanelxPanel magazine, edited by Hassan Otsmane-Elhaou, panelxpanel.com
- 2020 Women Write About Comics, edited by Nola Pfau and Wendy Browne, www.womenwriteaboutcomics.com
- 2021 Women Write About Comics, edited by Nola Pfau and Wendy Browne, www.womenwriteaboutcomics.com
- 2022 Women Write About Comics, edited by Wendy Browne and Nola Pfau, www.womenwriteaboutcomics.com
- 2023 PanelXPanel magazine, edited by Hassan Otsmane-Elhaou and Tiffany Babb (panelxpanel.com)
- 2024 The Comics Journal #309; edited by Gary Groth, Kristy Valenti, and Austin English (Fantagraphics)
- 2025 The Beat, edited by Heidi MacDonald and others, https://www.comicsbeat.com
- 2026 SKTCHD, by David Harper, www.sktchd.com

=== Best Academic/Scholarly Work ===
- 2012 (tie)
  - Cartooning: Philosophy & Practice, by Ivan Brunetti (Yale University Press)
  - Hand of Fire: The Comics Art of Jack Kirby, by Charles Hatfield (University Press of Mississippi)
- 2013 Lynda Barry: Girlhood Through the Looking Glass, by Susan E. Kirtley (University Press of Mississippi)
- 2014 Black Comics: The Politics of Race and Representation, edited by Sheena C. Howard and Ronald L. Jackson II (Bloomsbury)
- 2015 Graphic Details: Jewish Women's Confessional Comics in Essays and Interviews, edited by Sarah Lightman (McFarland)
- 2016 The Blacker the Ink: Constructions of Black Identity in Comics and Sequential Art, edited by Frances Gateward and John Jennings (Rutgers)
- 2017 Superwomen: Gender, Power, and Representation, by Carolyn Cocca (Bloomsbury)
- 2018 Latinx Superheroes in Mainstream Comics, by Frederick Luis Aldama (University of Arizona Press)
- 2019 Sweet Little Cunt: The Graphic Work of Julie Doucet, by Anne Elizabeth Moore (Uncivilized Books)
- 2020 EC Comics: Race, Shock, and Social Protest, by Qiana Whitted (Rutgers University Press)
- 2021 The Content of Our Caricature: African American Comic Art and Political Belonging, by Rebecca Wanzo (New York University Press)
- 2022 Comics and the Origins of Manga: A Revisionist History, by Eike Exner (Rutgers University Press)
- 2023 The LGBTQ+ Comics Studies Reader: Critical Openings, Future Directions, edited by Alison Halsall and Jonathan Warren (University Press of Mississippi)
- 2024 The Claremont Run: Subverting Gender in the X- Men, by J. Andrew Deman (University of Texas Press)
- 2025 Drawing (in) the Feminine: Bande Dessinée and Women edited by Margaret C. Flinn (Ohio State University Press)
- 2026 Manga’s First Century: How Creators and Fans Made Japanese Comics, 1905–1989, by Andrea Horbinski (University of California Press)

=== Best Comics-Related Book ===
- 1992 From "Aargh!" to "Zap!": Harvey Kurtzman's Visual History of the Comics, edited by Howard Zimmerman (Prentice Hall Press)
- 1994 Understanding Comics, by Scott McCloud (Kitchen Sink)
- 1996 Alex Toth, edited by Manuel Auad (Kitchen Sink)
- 1997 Graphic Storytelling by Will Eisner (Poorhouse Press)
- 1998 The R. Crumb Coffee Table Art Book, edited by Pete Poplaski (Kitchen Sink)
- 1999 Batman Animated, by Paul Dini and Chip Kidd (HarperCollins)
- 2000 Sandman: The Dream Hunters, by Neil Gaiman and Yoshitaka Amano (DC/Vertigo)
- 2001 Wonder Woman: The Complete History, by Les Daniels, edited by Steve Korte (Chronicle Books)
- 2002 Peanuts: The Art of Charles M. Schulz, edited by Chip Kidd (Pantheon)
- 2004 The Art of Hellboy, by Mike Mignola (Dark Horse)
- 2005 Men of Tomorrow: Geeks, Gangsters, and the Birth of the Comic Book, by Gerard Jones (Basic Books)
- 2006 Eisner/Miller, edited by Charles Brownstein and Diana Schutz (Dark Horse Books)
- 2007 The Art of Brian Bolland, edited by Joe Pruett (Desperado/Image)
- 2008 Reading Comics: How Graphic Novels Work and What They Mean, by Douglas Wolk (Da Capo Press)
- 2009 Kirby: King of Comics, by Mark Evanier (Abrams)
- 2010 The Art of Harvey Kurtzman: The Mad Genius of Comics, by Denis Kitchen and Paul Buhle (Abrams ComicArts)
- 2011 75 Years of DC Comics, by Paul Levitz
- 2012 MetaMaus, by Art Spiegelman (Pantheon)
- 2013 Marvel Comics: The Untold Story, by Sean Howe (HarperCollins)
- 2014 Genius, Illustrated: The Life and Art of Alex Toth, by Dean Mullaney and Bruce Canwell (The Library of American Comics)
- 2015 Genius Animated: The Cartoon Art of Alex Toth, vol. 3, by Dean Mullaney & Bruce Canwell (The Library of American Comics)
- 2016 Harvey Kurtzman: The Man Who Created MAD and Revolutionized Humor in America, by Bill Schelly (Fantagraphics)
- 2017 Krazy: George Herriman, A Life in Black and White, by Michael Tisserand (Harper)
- 2018 How to Read Nancy: The Elements of Comics in Three Easy Panels, by Paul Karasik and Mark Newgarden (Fantagraphics)
- 2019 Drawn to Purpose: American Women Illustrators and Cartoonists, by Martha H. Kennedy (University Press of Mississippi)
- 2020 Making Comics, by Lynda Barry (Drawn & Quarterly)
- 2021 Invisible Men: The Trailblazing Black Artists of Comic Books, by Ken Quattro (Yoe Books/IDW)
- 2022 All of the Marvels, by Douglas Wolk (Penguin Press)
- 2023 Charles M. Schulz: The Art and Life of the Peanuts Creator in 100 Objects, by Benjamin L. Clark and Nat Gertler (Schulz Museum)
- 2024 I Am the Law: How Judge Dredd Predicted Our Future, by Michael Molcher (Rebellion)
- 2025 Tell Me a Story Where the Bad Girl Wins: The Life and Art of Barbara Shermund by Caitlin McGurk (Fantagraphics)
- 2026 Crumb: A Cartoonist’s Life, by Dan Nadel (Scribner)

=== Best Comics-Related Publication (Periodical or Book) ===
- 2003 B. Krigstein, vol. 1, by Greg Sadowski (Fantagraphics)

=== Best Comics-Related Product/Item ===
- 1992 Sandman statue, by Randy Bowen (DC)
- 1994 Death Statue, by Chris Bachalo, et al. (DC)
- 1995 Sandman Arabian Nights statue, designed by P. Craig Russell and sculpted by Randy Bowen (DC/Graphitti Designs)
- 1996 Comic strip stamps (U.S. Postal Service)
- 1997 Hellboy bust, Randy Bowen (Bowen Designs)
- 1998 Acme Novelty Library display stand, designed by Chris Ware (Fantagraphics)
- 1999 Sandman Pocketwatch, designed by Kris Ruotolo (DC/Vertigo)
- 2000 Lunch boxes: Milk & Cheese, Sin City, Bettie Page, Hellboy, Groo (Dark Horse)
- 2002 Dark Horse classic comic characters statuettes, sculpted by Yoe Studio (Dark Horse)

=== Best Comics-Related Sculpted Figures ===
- 1999 Hellboy statue, sculpted by Randy Bowen, produced by Bowen Designs

=== Best Publication Design ===
- 1993 Sandman: Season of Mists, designed by Dave McKean (DC)
- 1994 Marvels, designed by Comicraft (Marvel)
- 1995 The Acme Novelty Library, designed by Chris Ware (Fantagraphics)
- 1996 The Acme Novelty Library, designed by Chris Ware (Fantagraphics)
- 1997 The Acme Novelty Library #7, designed by Chris Ware (Fantagraphics)
- 1998 Kingdom Come deluxe slipcover edition, art director Bob Chapman/DC design director Georg Brewer (DC Comics/Graphitti Designs)
- 1999 Batman Animated, designed by Chip Kidd (HarperCollins)
- 2000 300, designed by Mark Cox (Dark Horse)
- 2001 Jimmy Corrigan, designed by Chris Ware (Pantheon)
- 2002 Acme Novelty Library #15, designed by Chris Ware (Fantagraphics)
- 2003 Batman: Nine Lives, designed by Amie Brockway-Metcalf (DC)
- 2004 Mythology: The DC Comics Art of Alex Ross, designed by Chip Kidd (Pantheon)
- 2005 The Complete Peanuts, designed by Seth (Fantagraphics)
- 2006 (tie)
  - Acme Novelty Library Annual Report to Shareholders, designed by Chris Ware (Pantheon)
  - Little Nemo in Slumberland: So Many Splendid Sundays, designed by Philippe Ghielmetti (Sunday Press Books)
- 2007 Absolute DC: The New Frontier, designed by Darwyn Cooke (DC)
- 2008 Process Recess 2, designed by James Jean and Chris Pitzer (AdHouse)
- 2009 Hellboy Library Editions, designed by Cary Grazzini and Mike Mignola (Dark Horse)
- 2010 Absolute Justice, designed by Curtis King and Josh Beatman (DC)
- 2011 Dave Stevens' The Rocketeer: Artist's Edition, designed by Randall Dahlik (IDW)
- 2012 Jim Henson's Tale of Sand, designed by Eric Skillman (Archaia)
- 2013 Building Stories, designed by Chris Ware (Pantheon)
- 2014 Genius, Illustrated: The Life and Art of Alex Toth, designed by Dean Mullaney (The Library of American Comics/IDW)
- 2015 Little Nemo: Dream Another Dream, designed by Jim Rugg (Locust Moon)
- 2016 Sandman Gallery Edition, designed by Josh Beatman/Brainchild Studios (Graphitti Designs/DC)
- 2017 The Art of Charlie Chan Hock Chye, designed by Sonny Liew (Pantheon)
- 2018 Akira 35th Anniversary Edition, designed by Phil Balsman, Akira Saito (Veia), NORMA Editorial, and MASH•ROOM (Kodansha)
- 2019 Will Eisner's A Contract with God: Curator's Collection, designed by John Lind (Kitchen Sink/Dark Horse)
- 2020 Making Comics, designed by Lynda Barry (Drawn & Quarterly)
- 2021 The Loneliness of the Long-Distance Cartoonist, designed by Adrian Tomine and Tracy Huron (Drawn & Quarterly)
- 2022 Marvel Comics Library: Spider-Man vol. 1: 1962–1964 (TASCHEN)
- 2023 Parker: The Martini Edition—Last Call, designed by Sean Phillips (IDW)
- 2024 Bram Stoker's Dracula and Mary Shelley's Frankenstein boxed set, designed by Mike Kennedy (Magnetic)
- 2025 David Mazzucchelli’s Batman Year One Artist’s Edition designed by Chip Kidd (IDW)
- 2026 The Essential Peanuts, designed by Shawn Dahl with Chip Kidd (Abrams ComicArts)

== Special awards ==
=== Spirit of Comics Retailer Award ===
- 1993
  - Moondog's, Gary Colobuono (Chicago, IL)
  - The Beguiling, Sean Scoffield and Steve Solomos (Toronto, Ontario, Canada)
  - Comic Relief, Rory Root and Mike Patchen (Berkeley and San Francisco, CA)
- 1994
  - Golden Apple, Bill Liebowitz (Los Angeles, CA)
  - Dr. Comics & Mr. Games, Leon Cowen and Michael Pandolfo (Oakland, CA)
- 1995
  - Flying Colors, Joe Field (Concord, CA)
  - Lambiek, Kees Kousemaker (Amsterdam, Netherlands)
- 1996
  - KINGS Comics, George Vlastaras (Sydney, Australia)
  - Atlantis Fantasyworld, Joe & Dottie Ferrara (Santa Cruz, CA)
- 1997
  - Chicago Comics, Eric Kirsammer (Chicago, IL)
  - Central City Comics, Steve Snyder (Columbus, OH)
  - That's Entertainment, Paul Howley (Fitchburg and Worcester, MA)
- 1998
  - Hi De Ho Comics, Mark and Robert Hennessey (Santa Monica, CA)
  - Meltdown Comics & Collectibles, Gaston Dominquez and Ilia Carson (Los Angeles, CA)
- 1999
  - Star Clipper Comics & Games, Scott Thorne (St. Louis, MO)
  - DreamHaven Books & Comics, Greg Ketter (Minneapolis, MN)
- 2000 Golden Age Collectables, Patrick Shaughnessy (Vancouver, British Columbia, Canada)
- 2001 Strange Adventures, Calum Johnston (Halifax, Nova Scotia, Canada)
- 2002 Source Comics & Games, Nick Postilgione (Falcon Heights, MN)
- 2003 All About Books and Comics, Alan and Marsha Giroux (Phoenix, AZ)
- 2004 ACME Comics & Collectibles, Fran and Kevin McGarry (Sioux City, IA)
- 2005 Night Flight Comics, Mimi Cruz and Alan Carroll (Salt Lake City, UT)
- 2006 Zeus Comics, Richard Neal (Dallas, TX)
- 2007 Earth-2 Comics, Carr D’Angelo and Jud Meyers (Sherman Oaks, CA)
- 2008 Brave New World, Atom! and Portlyn Freeman (Newhall, CA)
- 2009 Tate's Comics, Tate and Amanda Ottati (Fort Lauderdale, FL)
- 2010 Vault of Midnight, Curtis Sullivan and Steve Fodale (Ann Arbor, MI)
- 2011 Comics & Vegetables, Yuval Sharon and Danny Amitai (Tel Aviv, Israel)
- 2012
  - Akira Comics, Jesús Marugán Escobar (Madrid, Spain)
  - The Dragon, Jennifer Haines (Guelph, Ontario, Canada)
- 2013 Challengers Comics and Conversation, Patrick Brower and W. Dal Bush (Chicago, IL)
- 2014
  - All Star Comics, Troy Varker and Mitchell Davies (Melbourne, Australia)
  - Legend Comics & Coffee, David DeMarco, Jason Dasenbrock, and Wendy Pivonka (Omaha, NE)
- 2015 Packrat Comics, Jamie Colegrove and Teresa Colegrove (Hilliard, OH)
- 2016 Orbital Comics, Karl Asaa, Damian Keeng and James Wilson (London, UK)
- 2017 Comicazi, Robert Howard, David Lockwood, Michael Burke (Somerville, MA)
- 2018 Norma Comics, Rafa Martinez (Barcelona, Spain)
- 2019 La Revisteria Comics, Alejandro Gonzalez (Buenos Aires, Argentina)
- 2020 Nostromo Sevilla, Sergio López (Seville, Spain)
- 2021 The Laughing Ogre, Chris Lloyd (Columbus, OH)
- 2022 Books with Pictures: Comics for Everyone, Katie Pryde (Portland, OR)
- 2023 Cape & Cowl Comics, Eitan Manhoff (Oakland, CA)
- 2024 Blackbird Comics, David Craig and Candace Faulkner Craig (Maitland, FL)
- 2025 Akira Comics, Jesús Marugán, Iván Marugán, Mariano Marugán and Justina Escobar (Madrid, Spain)
- 2026 Books with Pictures, Andréa Gilroy and Katie Pryde (Eugene, OR)

=== Bob Clampett Humanitarian Award ===
- 1984 Forrest J Ackerman
- 1985 Robert A. Heinlein
- 1986
  - Bernie Wrightson
  - Jim Starlin
- 1987 Ray Bradbury
- 1988 June Foray
- 1989 Phil Yeh
- 1990 Sergio Aragonés
- 1991 The Comic Book Legal Defense Fund
- 1992 Archie Goodwin
- 1993 Jack Kirby
- 1994 Will Eisner
- 1995 Maggie Thompson
- 1996 Andrew Vachss
- 1997 Joe Kubert
- 1998 Frank Miller
- 1999 Jerry Robinson
- 2000 Peter Laird
- 2001 Mark Evanier
- 2002 Herb Trimpe
- 2003 Alex Ross
- 2004 Mimi Cruz
- 2005 George Pérez
- 2006 Calvin Reid
- 2007 Neil Gaiman
- 2008 Paul Levitz
- 2009 Denis Kitchen
- 2010 Jeannie Schulz
- 2011 Patrick McDonnell
- 2012 Morrie Turner
- 2013
  - Chris Sparks
  - Team Cul de Sac
- 2014 Joe Field
- 2015 Bill and Kayre Morrison
- 2016 Matthew Inman (TheOatmeal.com)
- 2017
  - Marc Andreyko
  - Joe Ferrara
- 2018
  - Frederick Joseph
  - Comics4Kids
- 2019
  - Edgardo Miranda-Rodriguez (Ricanstruction: Reminiscing & Rebuilding Puerto Rico)
  - Lisa Wood (Thought Bubble Festival)
- 2020
  - The Hero Initiative
  - Creators4Comics
  - Comicbook United Fund
- 2021 Mike and Christine Mignola
- 2022 Annie Koyama
- 2023
  - Beth Accomando
  - Scott Dunbier
- 2024 Regine Sawyer (Women in Comics Collective International)
- 2025 Mike Marts (L.A. Strong Charity Comic)
- 2026 Wendy and Richard Pini

=== The Will Eisner Award Hall of Fame ===
- 1987: Carl Barks, Will Eisner, Jack Kirby
  - Inducted in the final year of the Kirby Awards before they split into Eisner Awards and Harvey Awards
- 1988: Milton Caniff
- 1989: Harvey Kurtzman
- 1991: Robert Crumb, Alex Toth
- 1992: Joe Shuster, Jerry Siegel, Wally Wood
- 1993: C. C. Beck, William Gaines
- 1994: Steve Ditko, Stan Lee
- 1995: Frank Frazetta, Walt Kelly
- 1996: Hal Foster, Bob Kane, Winsor McCay, Alex Raymond
- 1997: Gil Kane, Charles M. Schulz, Julius Schwartz, Curt Swan
- 1998: Neal Adams, Archie Goodwin, Joe Kubert, Jean "Moebius" Giraud
- 1999 Judges' Choices: Jack Cole, L. B. Cole, Bill Finger, Gardner Fox, Mac Raboy, Alex Schomburg; Voters' Choices: Murphy Anderson, Joe Simon, Art Spiegelman, Dick Sprang
- 2000 Judges' Choices: Bill Everett, Sheldon Mayer; Voters' Choices: George Herriman, Carmine Infantino, Al Williamson, Basil Wolverton
- 2001 Judges' Choices: Dale Messick, Roy Crane; Voters' Choices: Chester Gould, Frank King, E. C. Segar, Marie Severin
- 2002 Judges' Choices: Charles Biro, Osamu Tezuka; Voters' Choices: Sergio Aragonés, John Buscema, Dan DeCarlo, John Romita Sr.
- 2003 Judges' Choices: Hergé, Bernard Krigstein; Voters' Choices: Jack Davis, Will Elder, Al Feldstein, John Severin
- 2004 Judges' Choices: Otto Binder, John Stanley, Kazuo Koike, Goseki Kojima; Voters' Choices: Al Capp, Jules Feiffer, Don Martin, Jerry Robinson
- 2005 Judges' Choices: Lou Fine, René Goscinny, Albert Uderzo; Voters' Choices: Johnny Craig, Hugo Pratt, Nick Cardy, Gene Colan
- 2006 Judges' Choices: Floyd Gottfredson, William Moulton Marston; Voters' Choices: Vaughn Bodē, Ramona Fradon, Russ Manning, Jim Steranko
- 2007 Judges' Choices: Robert Kanigher, Ogden Whitney; Voters' Choices: Ross Andru & Mike Esposito, Dick Ayers, Wayne Boring, Joe Orlando
- 2008 Judges' Choices: Richard F. Outcault, Major Malcolm Wheeler-Nicholson; Voters' Choices: John Broome, Arnold Drake, Len Wein, Barry Windsor-Smith
- 2009 Judges' Choices: Harold Gray, Graham Ingels; Voters' Choices: Matt Baker, Reed Crandall, Russ Heath, Jerry Iger
- 2010 Judges' Choices: Burne Hogarth, Bob Montana; Voters' Choices: Steve Gerber, Dick Giordano, Michael Kaluta, Mort Weisinger
- 2011 Judges' Choices: Ernie Bushmiller, Jack Jackson, Martin Nodell, Lynd Ward; Voters' Choices: Mort Drucker, Harvey Pekar, Roy Thomas, Marv Wolfman
- 2012 Judges' Choices: Rudolph Dirks, Harry Lucey; Voters' Choices: Bill Blackbeard, Richard Corben, Katsuhiro Otomo, Gilbert Shelton
- 2013 Judges' Choices: Mort Meskin, Spain Rodriguez; Voters' Choices: Lee Falk, Al Jaffee, Trina Robbins, Joe Sinnott
- 2014 Judges' Choices: Irwin Hasen, Sheldon Moldoff, Orrin C. Evans; Voters' Choices: Hayao Miyazaki, Alan Moore, Dennis O'Neil, Bernie Wrightson
- 2015 Judges' Choices: Marge (Marjorie Henderson Buell), Bill Woggon; Voters' Choices: John Byrne, Chris Claremont, Denis Kitchen, Frank Miller
- 2016 Judges' Choices: Carl Burgos, Tove Jansson; Voters' Choices: Lynda Barry, Rube Goldberg, Matt Groening, Jacques Tardi
- 2017 Judges' Choices: Milt Gross, H. G. Peter, Antonio Prohías, Dori Seda; Voters' Choices: Gilbert Hernandez, Jaime Hernandez, George Pérez, Walt Simonson, Jim Starlin
- 2018 Judges' Choices: Carol Kalish, Jackie Ormes; Voters' Choices: Charles Addams, Karen Berger, Dave Gibbons, Rumiko Takahashi
- 2019 Judges' Choices: Jim Aparo, June Tarpé Mills, Dave Stevens, Morrie Turner; Voters' Choices: José Luis García-López, Jenette Kahn, Paul Levitz, Wendy and Richard Pini, Bill Sienkiewicz
- 2020 Judges' Choices: Nell Brinkley, E. Simms Campbell; Voters' Choices: Alison Bechdel, Howard Cruse, Louise Simonson, Stan Sakai, Don and Maggie Thompson, Bill Watterson
- 2021 Pioneers: Thomas Nast, Rodolphe Töpffer; Judges' Choices: Alberto Breccia, Stan Goldberg, Françoise Mouly, Lily Renée Phillips; Voters' Choices: Ruth Atkinson, Dave Cockrum, Neil Gaiman, Scott McCloud
- 2022 Judges' Choices: Marie Duval, Rose O'Neill, Max Gaines, Mark Gruenwald, Alex Niño, P. Craig Russell; Voters' Choices: Howard Chaykin, Kevin Eastman, Larry Hama, Moto Hagio, David Mazzucchelli, Grant Morrison.
- 2023 Judges' Choices: Jerry Bails, Tony DeZuniga, Justin Green, Bill Griffith, Jay Jackson, Jeffrey Catherine Jones, Jack Katz, Aline Kominsky-Crumb, Win Mortimer, Diane Noomin, Gaspar Saladino, Kim Thompson, Garry Trudeau, Mort Walker, Tatjana Wood; Voters' Choices: Brian Bolland, Ann Nocenti, Tim Sale, Diana Schutz.
- 2024 Judges' Choices: Creig Flessel, A. B. Frost, Billy Graham, Albert Kanter, Warren Kremer, Oskar Lebeck, Frans Masereel, Keiji Nakazawa, Noel Sickles, Cliff Sterrett, E. C. Stoner, George Tuska, Kim Deitch, Gary Groth, Don McGregor, Bryan Talbot, Ron Turner, Lynn Varley, James Warren; Voters' Choices: Klaus Janson, Jim Lee, Mike Mignola, Jill Thompson.
- 2025 Judges' Choices:Peter Arno, Gus Arriola, Wilhelm Busch, Richard “Grass” Green, Rea Irvin, Jack Kamen, Joe Maneely, Shigeru Mizuki, Bob Oksner, Bob Powell, Ira Schnapp, Phil Seuling, Steve Bissette, Lucy Shelton Caswell, Philippe Druillet, Phoebe Gloeckner, Joe Sacco, Bill Schanes, Steve Schanes, Frank Stack, Angelo Torres. Voters' Choices: Kyle Baker, Eddie Campbell, Roz Chast, Dan Clowes, Junji Ito, Todd Klein, John Romita, Jr.
- 2026: Judges' Choices: Edwina Dumm, Oliver Harrington, Don Heck, Abe Kanegson, Paul S. Newman, Hector German Osterheld, Tom Palmer Sr., Jimmy Swinnerton, Bob Bolling, Gerry Conway, Denys Cowan, Mike Friedrich, Lee Marrs, Go Nagai, Bud Plant, Mike Royer, Dave Sim, Carol Tyler, Rick Veitch. Voters' Choices: Colleen Doran, Jeff Smith, Akira Toriyama, Chris Ware

== See also ==
- Bill Finger Award (additionally presented during Eisner Awards ceremony)
- Russ Manning Award (Most Promising Newcomer Award, additionally presented during Eisner Awards ceremony)
- Alley Award (awarded from 1961 to 1969)
- Eagle Award (UK Fan awards since 1977)
- Inkpot Award (given since 1974 at Comic-Con)
- Kirby Award (given from 1985 to 1987)
- Harvey Award (started in 1987, after dissolution of Kirby Awards)
- Shazam Award (given from 1970 to 1975)
