= Motherlover (webcomic) =

Webcomic by Lindsay Ishihiro

- Author: Lindsay Ishihiro
- Website: https://motherlovercomic.com/
- Current status/schedule: Completed
- Launch date: 2018
- End date: 2024
- Genre(s): LGBTQ, Romance

Motherlover is a LGBTQ romance webcomic by Lindsay Ishihiro, originally published from 2018 to 2024. In 2025, a graphic novel was published by Iron Circus. It was nominated for the Eisner Award for Best Webcomic in 2025.

== Plot ==
When Imogen, a mother of four, meets Alex, a lesbian single mother and her new neighbor, the two women strike a friendship. After she learns her husband is both mismanaging their bills and cheating on her, Imogen divorces him, starts attending college, and moves with her children to Alex's place, where their relationship grows into a romance.

The series includes a subplot where Imogen's oldest child Lulu comes out as a trans girl.

== Development ==
According to the author, the comic was inspired by a strip from their other webcomic, How Baby, which depicted two mothers being envious of each other. The webcomic was originally published online from 2018 to 2024. A graphic novel containing the entire comic was published by Iron Circus Comics on May 6, 2025.

== Reception ==
Broken Frontier's Edward Picot praised the slowburn romance and the complex relationship between Alex and her brother, but was critical the flatness of the child characters and the lack of exploration into Lulu's transition. Publishers Weekly gave the graphic novel a starred review, citing the "colorful, animated" artwork and the representation regarding body types and LGBTQ+ identities.

George Gene Gustines of the New York Times stated "the relatable situations, measured pace and true-to-the-ear dialogue will have readers cheering for them."

Masha Zhdanova writing for WomenWriteAboutComics gave particular praise to the detailed backgrounds in the comic, stating "the environments in Motherlover feel distinct and personal and real, like places I could see in the outside world". Zhdanova also commented on the protagonist being parents, considering it a "different and valuable perspective to the webcomics scene."

The series was nominated for the 2025 Eisner Award for Best Webcomic.
