= Eisner Award for Best Publication for a Younger Audience =

Former American comic book award

- Country: United States
- First award: 1996
- Final award: 2007
- Website: www.comic-con.org/awards/eisner-awards/

The Eisner Award for Best Publication for a Younger Audience was an award for "creative achievement" in American comic books. It was given out every year from 1996 to 2007. It was previously called Best Title for Younger Readers, Best Comics Publication for a Younger Audience, and Best Title for a Younger Audience. As of 2008, the Eisner Awards have categories for Best Publication for Teens and Best Publication for Kids.

== Winners and nominees ==
Year	Title	Creators	Publisher	Ref.
1990s
1996	Batman & Robin Adventures	Paul Dini, Ty Templeton, and Rick Burchett	DC	
1996	Akiko on the Planet Smoo	Mark Crilley	Sirius	
1996	Bone	Jeff Smith	Cartoon Books/Image	
1996	Lisa Comics #1	Mary Trainor, Mili Smythe, Stephanie Gladden, Bill Morrison, and Chris Clements	Bongo Comics	
1996	Uncle Scrooge	Don Rosa	Gladstone Comics	
1996	Walt Disney's Comics & Stories	William Van Horn and others	Gladstone Comics	
1997	Leave It to Chance	James Robinson and Paul Smith	Homage	
1997	Akiko	Mark Crilley	Sirius	
1997	Patty Cake	Scott Roberts	Permanent Press/Tapestry	
1997	Untold Tales of Spider-Man	Kurt Busiek and Pat Olliffe	Marvel	
1997	Usagi Yojimbo	Stan Sakai	Dark Horse	
1997	Walt Disney's Comics & Stories	John Clark (editor)	Gladstone	
1998	Batman & Robin Adventures	Ty Templeton, Brandon Kruse, Rick Burchett, and others	DC	
1998	Akiko	Mark Crilley	Sirius	
1998	Bone	Jeff Smith	Cartoon Books	
1998	Gon Swimmin	Masahi Tanaka	Paradox Press	
1998	Leave It to Chance	James Robinson and Paul Smith	Homage	
1998	Whats Michael	Makoto Kobayashi	Dark Horse	
1999	Batman: The Gotham Adventures		DC	
1999	Akiko	Mark Crilley	Sirius	
1999	Colonia	Jeff Nicholson	Colonia Press	
1999	Simpsons Comics	Various	Bongo	
1999	Young Justice	Peter David, Todd Nauck, and Lary Stucker	DC	
2000s
2000	Simpsons Comics	Various	Bongo	
2000	Akiko	Mark Crilley	Sirius	
2000	Batman: The Gotham Adventures	Scott Peterson, Tim Levins, Craig Rousseau, and Terry Beatty, and others	DC	
2000	Clan Apis	Jay Hosler	Active Synapse	
2000	Herobear and the Kid	Mike Kunkel	Astonish Comics	
2000	Superman Adventures	Mark Millar, Aluir Amancio, Terry Austin, and others	DC	
2001	Scary Godmother: The Boo Flu	Jill Thompson	Sirius	
2001	Akiko	Mark Crilley	Sirius	
2001	Clan Apis	Jay Hosler	Active Synapse	
2001	Little Lit	Art Spiegelman and Francoise Mouly	HarperCollins	
2001	Louis: Red Letter Day	Metaphrog	Metaphrog	
2002	Herobear and the Kid	Mike Kunkel	Astonish	
2002	Courageous Princess: The Quest for Home	Rod Espinosa	Antarctic	
2002	Little Lit: Strange Stories for Strange Kids	Art Spiegelman and Francoise Mouly	HarperCollins	
2002	Patty Cake & Friends	Scott Roberts	Amaze Ink/Slave Labor	
2002	The Return of Alison Dare, Little Miss Adventures	J. Torres and J. Bone	Oni	
2003	Herobear and the Kid	Mike Kunkel	Astonish Comics	
2003	Amelia Rules!	Jimmy Gownley	Renaissance	
2003	Growing Up Enchanted	Jack Briglio and Alex Szewczuk	Too Hip Gotta Go Graphics	
2003	Pinky & Stinky	James Kochalka	Top Shelf	
2003	Ug: Boy Genius of the Stone Age	Raymond Briggs	Knopf	
2003	Wind in the Willows, vol. 4	Kenneth Grahame, adapted by Michel Plessix	NBM	
2004	Walt Disney's Uncle Scrooge	Various	Gemstone	
2004	Astro Boy	Osamu Tezuka	Dark Horse	
2004	Happy Halloween, Li'l Santa	Thierry Robin and Lewis Trondheim	NBM	
2004	Little Lit: It Was a Dark and Silly Night	Art Spiegelman and Francoise Mouly	HarperCollins	
2004	Little Vampire Does Kung Fu!	Joann Sfar	Simon & Schuster	
	Peanutbutter and Jeremy's Best Book Ever!	James Kochalka	Alternative	
2005	Plastic Man	Kyle Baker and Scott Morse	DC	
2005	Amelia Rules! and Amelia Rules! What Makes You Happy	Jimmy Gownley	Renaissance Press/iBooks	
2005	Courtney Crumrin in the Twilight Kingdom	Ted Naifeh	Oni	
2005	Owly	Andy Runton	Top Shelf	
2005	Tommysaurus Rex	Doug TenNapel	Image	
2006	Owly: Flying Lessons	Andy Runton	Top Shelf	
2006	Amelia Rules!	Jimmy Gownley	Renaissance Press	
2006	The Clouds Above	Jordan Crane	Fantagraphics	
2006	Franklin Richards, Son of a Genius	Chris Eliopoulous and Mark	Marvel	
2006	Spiral-Bound	Aaron Renier	Top Shelf	
2007	Gumby	Bob Burden and Rick Geary	Wildcard	
2007	Chickenhare	Chris Grine	Dark Horse	
2007	Drawing Comics Is Easy (Except When It's Hard)	Alexa Kitchen	Denis Kitchen Publishing	
2007	Moomin	Tove Jansson	Drawn & Quarterly	
2007	To Dance: A Ballerina's Graphic Novel	Sienna Cherson and Mark Siegel	Simon & Schuster	
