= Tiger, Tiger (webcomic) =

Webcomic by Petra Erika Nordlund

- Author: Petra Erika Nordlund
- Website: https://www.tigertigercomic.com/
- Current status/schedule: Ongoing
- Launch date: March 7, 2018;

Tiger, Tiger is a webcomic by Petra Erika Nordlund which has been published online since 2018. It won the 2026 Eisner Award for Best Webcomic, having previously been nominated for the award in 2019. The author has stated that the comic is not named after the poem by William Blake, but rather after a brand of liquor.

== Plot ==
Ludovica, a noblewoman with an interest in studying sea sponges, assumes the identity and ship of her brother Remy and sets off, but finds the seas contain more mysteries and dangers than she ever imagined.

== Release ==
The comic has been self-published digitally since 2018. A print volume was released by Seven Seas Entertainment in 2023.

== Reception ==
In 2021, the A.V. Club listed Tiger, Tiger as one of the best comics of the year, giving attention to the comedic elements, designs of monsters, and the developments for Remy's character in that year of the comic.

Awards and nominations for Tiger, Tiger
Year	Award/Honor	Result	Ref.
2026	Eisner Award for Best Webcomic	Won	
2024	American Library Association's Great Graphic Novels for Teens (for print Volume 1)	Top Ten	
2019	Eisner Award for Best Webcomic	Nominated	
