= Erica Eng =

Malaysian comic artist

- Born: Erica Eng Hui Qing; Batu Pahat, Johor, Malaysia
- Education: Academy of Art University
- Occupation: Comic book artist
- Writing career
- Years active: 2019–present
- Notable awards: Eisner Award (2020)

Erica Eng Hui Qing is a Malaysian comic book artist and animator best known for her autobiographical comic Fried Rice. She is the first Malaysian in history to win an Eisner Award.

== Early life and education ==
Eng was born in Batu Pahat, Johor. As a child, she showed interest in becoming an author-illustrator. Eng earned a Bachelor of Fine Arts degree from The Academy of Art University.

== Career ==
Eng began publishing Fried Rice in 2019 on Tumblr. It is inspired by her life experiences after being rejected from an arts school in the United States that she had applied to in 2016.

== Awards & recognition ==
In 2020, Eng's Fried Rice was awarded the Eisner Award for Best Webcomic.

In 2024, she was included in the Forbes 30 Under 30 "Asia - Media, Marketing & Advertising" list.
