= Mike Kunkel =

American cartoonist

Mike Kunkel, cartoonist, at Dragon Con in Atlanta Ga September 7 2026

Mike Kunkel is an American cartoonist known, among other things, for his work on Billy Batson and the Magic of Shazam! and for his creator-owned Herobear and the Kid, for which he has won two Eisner awards.
