= Herobear and the Kid =

Comic book series by Mike Kunkel

Herobear and the kid

Publication information
- Publisher: Astonish Factory
- Main character: Herobear

Creative team as of 2002
- Written by: Mike Kunkel
- Artist: Mike Kunkel

Herobear and the Kid is a monthly comic book. It won the Eisner Award for "Best Title for Younger Readers/Best Comics Publication for a Younger Audience" in both 2002 and 2003. Volume One consisted of six issues which were then collected in one softcover volume as well as a limited edition hardcover volume.

A second series, Herobear and the Kid: Saving Time, was published in 2014 to positive reviews.

== Plot summary ==
Tyler's life is changed when he inherits a toy bear and a broken pocket watch. These items gave him a feeling. A friend, someone who will understand him during hard times.

== See also ==
- Alternative comics
