= Sophie Yanow =

Artist/graphic novelist from California

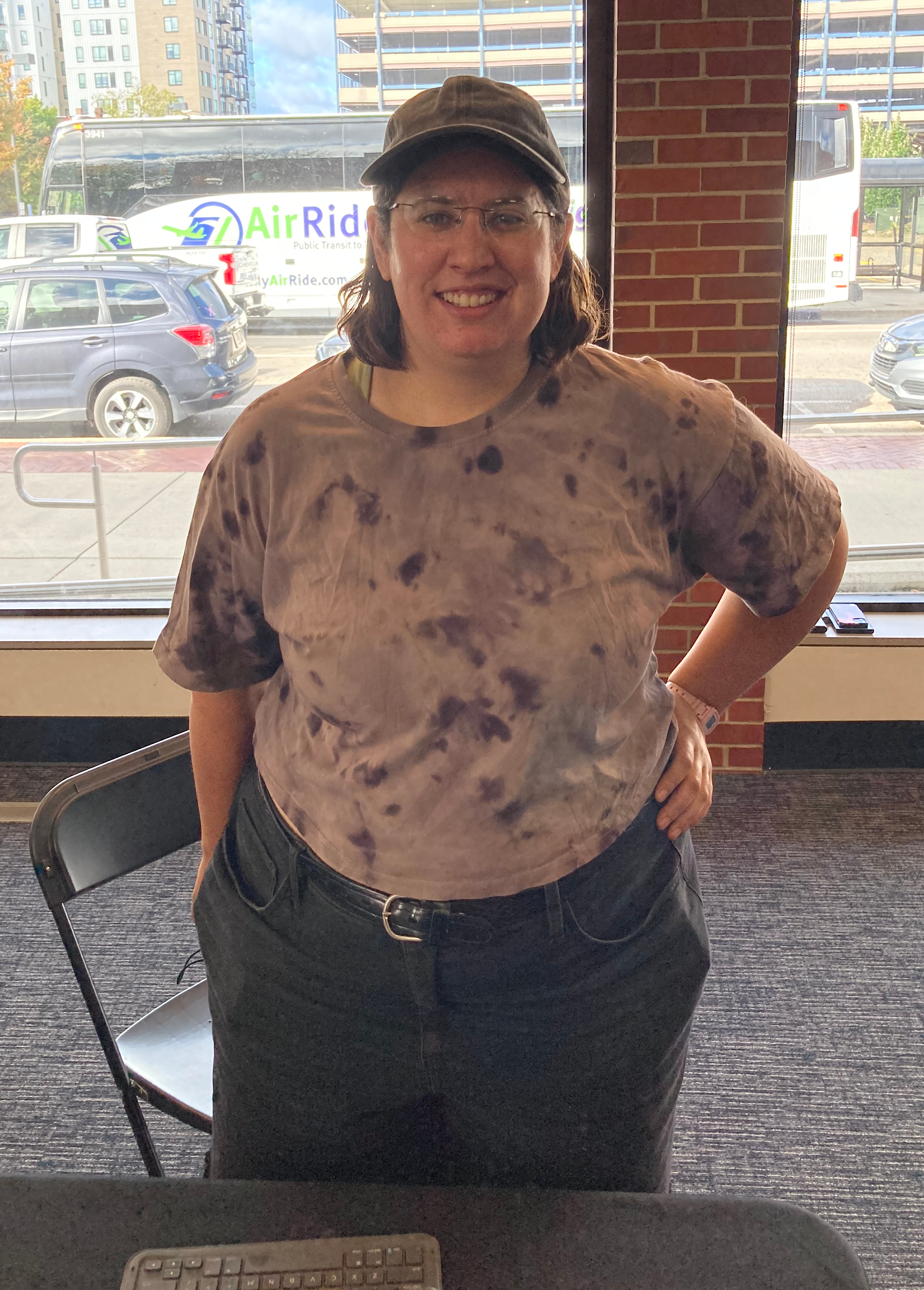
- At Ann Arbor Comic Arts Festival 2023
- Born: Sophia Ondine Yanow; May 17, 1987 (age 37); Marin County, California
- Occupation(s): Artist, graphic novelist
- Awards: Eisner Award for Best Webcomic (2019); Scott Moncrieff Prize (2019)
- Website: www.sophieyanow.com

Sophia Ondine Yanow (born 1987) is an artist and graphic novelist from California.

== Work ==
Sophie Yanow was born in Marin County, California on May 17, 1987. In 2011 she moved to Montreal, Quebec for an artist residency at La Maison de la Bande Dessinée, where she became a member of the Colosse comics. With Colosse she published a collection of journal comics recording her transition to Montreal under the title In Situ, a nod to site-specificity in her creative process.

In Montreal she has also participated in projects such as the 48 Heures de la Bande Dessinée, the strike-related online Manif de Bonhommes, and La Hausse en Question strike zine. Her work has also appeared online in places like Top Shelf Comix and The Rumpus.

Her 2020 comic The Contradictions (Drawn & Quarterly, Montreal) is a fictionalized account of studying abroad in Paris; the work was described as "a masterpiece" by Alison Bechdel.

In 2019, she won the Eisner Award for Best Webcomic for The Contradictions and a Scott Moncrieff Prize for her translation of Pretending Is Lying by Dominique Goblet.

== Books ==
- War of Streets and Houses (2013)
- What Is a Glacier? (2017)
- The Contradictions (2020)
