= Eisner Award for Best Graphic Album =

Former American comic book award (1988-1989)

- Country: United States
- First award: 1988
- Final award: 1989
- Website: www.comic-con.org/awards/eisner-awards/

The Eisner Award for Best Graphic Album was an award for American comic books. It was given 1988 and 1989. After 1990, it was replaced by the Eisner Award for Best Graphic Album — New and Eisner Award for Best Graphic Album — Reprint.

== Winners and nominees ==
Year	Creators	Title	Publisher	Ref.
1988	Alan Moore and Dave Gibbons	Watchmen	DC	
1988	Mike W. Barr and Jerry Bingham	Batman: Son of the Demon	DC	
1988	Harlan Ellison and Ken Steacy	Night and the Enemy	Comico	
1988	Doug Wildey	Rio	Comico	
1989	Alan Moore and Brian Bolland	Batman: The Killing Joke	DC	
1989	Dan Barry and Harvey Kurtzman	Flash Gordon	Kitchen Sink	
1989	Charles Burns	Hardboiled Defective Stories	RAW/Pantheon	
1989	Alexandro Jodorowsky and Jean "Moebius" Giraud	Incal	Marvel	
1989	Al Capp	Li'l Abner	Kitchen Sink	
1989	Stan Lee and Jean "Moebius" Giraud	Silver Surfer	Marvel	
