= Eisner Award for Best Webcomic =

American comic book award

- Awarded for: Best Webcomic
- Country: United States
- First award: 2017
- Most recent winner: Tiger, Tiger by Petra Erika Nordlund
- Website: www.comic-con.org/awards/eisner-awards/

The Eisner Award for Best Webcomic is an award for "creative achievement" in American comic books for material originally published as a webcomic.

== History and name change ==
Webcomics were eligible for the Best Digital Comic award when it was created in 2005. In 2014 the award was changed to Best Digital/Webcomic. In 2017 the award was split into Best Digital Comic and Best Webcomic.

== Winners and nominees ==
Year	Title	Authors	Website	Ref.
2010s
2017	Bird Boy	Anne Szabla		
2017	Deja Brew	Taneka Stotts and Sarah DuVall		
2017	Jaeger	Ibrahim Moustafa		
2017	The Middle Age	Steve Conley	steveconley.com/the-middle-age	
2017	On Beauty	Christina Tran	sodelightful.com/comics/beauty/	
2018	The Tea Dragon Society	Katie O'Neill	teadragonsociety.com	
2018	Awaiting a Wave (The Weather Channel)	Dale Carpenter and Nate Powell		
2018	Brothers Bond	Kevin Grevioux and Ryan Benjamin	www.webtoons.com/en/action/brothersbond/list?title_no=1458&page=1	
2018	Dispatch from a Sanctuary City (The Nib)	Mike Dawson	thenib.com/dispatch-from-a-sanctuary-city	
2018	Welcome to the New World (New York Times Sunday Review)	Jake Halpern and Michael Sloan	www.nytimes.com/interactive/2017/10/26/opinion/sunday/welcome-to-the-new-world.html	
2019	The Contradictions	Sophie Yanow		
2019	Lavender Jack	Dan Schkade	www.webtoons.com/en/thriller/lavender-jack/list?title_no=1410&page=1	
2019	Let's Play	Mongie	www.webtoons.com/en/romance/letsplay/list?title_no=1218&page=1	
2019	Lore Olympus	Rachel Smythe	www.webtoons.com/en/romance/lore-olympus/list?title_no=1320&page=1	
2019	Tiger, Tiger (Hiveworks)	Petra Erika Nordlund	www.tigertigercomic.com	
2020s
2020	Fried Rice Comic	Erica Eng	friedricecomic.com	
2020	Cabramatta	Matt Huynh	thebeliever.net/cabramatta/	
2020	Chuckwagon at the End of the World	Erik Lundy	www.theknucklesammich.com/restauranthtml/	
2020	The Eyes	Javi de Castro	www.javidecastro.com/theeyes	
2020	reMIND	Jason Brubaker		
2020	Third Shift Society	Meredith Moriarty	www.webtoons.com/en/supernatural/third-shift-society/list?title_no=1703	
2021	Crisis Zone	Simon Hanselmann	www.instagram.com/simon.hanselmann/	
2021	BFF	Clément C. Fabre, Joseph Saffiedine, and Thomas Cadène	www.webtoonfactory.com/en/webtoons/114-bff-saison-1/	
2021	DPS! Only	Vel	tapas.io/series/dpsonly/	
2021	Isle of Elsi	Alec Longstreth	www.isleofelsi.com	
2021	The Kiss Bet	Ingrid Ochoa	www.webtoons.com/en/romance/the-kiss-bet/list?title_no=1617	
2021	The Middle Age	Steve Conley	middleagecomic.com	
2022	Lore Olympus	Rachel Smythe	www.webtoons.com/en/romance/lore-olympus/list?title_no=1320	
2022	Batman: Wayne Family Adventures	CRC Payne, Starbite	www.webtoons.com/en/slice-of-life/batman-wayne-family-adventures/list?title_no=3180	
2022	Isle of Elsi	Alec Longstreth	www.isleofelsi.com	
2022	Navillera: Like a Butterfly	Hun and Jimmy, translated by Kristianna Lee	tapas.io/series/navillera-like-a-butterfly/info	
2022	Unmasked	Breri and Nuitt	www.webtoonfactory.com/en/serie/unmasked/	
2023	Lore Olympus	Rachel Smythe	www.webtoons.com/en/romance/lore-olympus/list?title_no=1320	
2023	Deeply Dave	Grover	https://deeplydave.com/	
2023	Delilah Dirk: Practical Defence Against Piracy	Tony Cliff	https://www.delilahdirk.com/dd4/dd4-p46.html	
2023	The Mannamong	Michael Adam Lengyel	https://www.mannamong.com/episode-1/	
2023	Spores	Joshua Barkman	https://falseknees.com/comics/22ink1.html	
2024	Lore Olympus	Rachel Smythe	www.webtoons.com/en/romance/lore-olympus/list?title_no=1320	
2024	Asturias: The Origin of a Flag	Javi de Castro	https://www.javidecastro.com/asturias-the-origin-of-a-flag	
2024	Daughter of a Thousand Faces	Vel (Velinxi)	https://tapas.io/series/daughter-of-a-thousand-faces/info	
2024	Matchmaker, Vol. 6	Cam Marshall	https://matchmakercomic.com/	
2024	3rd Voice	Evan Dahm	https://www.webtoons.com/en/canvas/3rd-voice/list?title_no=828919	
2024	Unfamiliar	Haley Newsome	https://tapas.io/series/unfamiliar/info	
2025	Life After Life	Joshua Barkman	falseknees.com/comics/24ink1.html	
2025	The Accidental Undergrad	Christian Giroux	https://solrad.co/tag/the-accidental-undergrad	
2025	Motherlover	Lindsay Ishihiro	https://motherlovercomic.com/	
2025	Delilah Dirk: Practical Defence Against Piracy	Tony Cliff	https://www.delilahdirk.com/dd4/dd4-p188.html	
2025	Rigsby WI	S. E. Case	https://rigsbywi.com	
2026	Tiger, Tiger	Petra Erika Nordlund	https://www.tigertigercomic.com/tiger-tiger/001	
2026	The Accidental Undergrad	Christian Giroux	https://solrad.co/tag/the-accidental-undergrad	
2026	Keeping Time	Kody Okamoto	keepingtimecomic.com	
2026	The Legend of Parvaterra	Raúl Arnáiz	https://www.webtoons.com/en/canvas/the-legend-of-parvaterra-1-english-extended/list?title_no=28648	
2026	Sable: A Ghost Story	Ethan M. Aldridge	https://sablecomic.com/comic/98/	
2026	Superfish	Peglo	https://www.webtoons.com/en/supernatural/superfish/list?title_no=7777	
2026	Terran Omega: The Ghosts of War	PJ Holden	https://www.pauljholden.com/series/terran-omega-ghosts-of-war/	
