= Batman Animated =

Book by Paul Dini

- Cover to the hardcover edition of Batman Animated.
- Author: Paul Dini and Chip Kidd
- Illustrator: Bruce Timm and others
- Cover artist: Bruce Timm
- Language: English
- Subject: Batman: The Animated Series
- Publisher: Titan Books
- Publication date: October 1998
- Publication place: United States
- Media type: Hardback
- Pages: 144
- ISBN: 1-84023-016-9
- OCLC: 40683061

Batman Animated is a coffee table book written by Paul Dini and designed by Chip Kidd, first published in 1998. Based on the popular TV show Batman: The Animated Series, the hardcover edition was released by Titan Books. A paperback edition of the book was published later.

== Overview ==
A very picture-heavy book, Batman Animated features numerous sketches, storyboards, character designs, finished paintings and other material from the popular animated series about Batman, the iconic superhero character in the comic books published by DC Comics. The book details Batman's development from series producer and co-creator Bruce Timm's early sketches to his eventual finished look in the series, as well as the newer designs Timm made for the follow-up series The New Batman Adventures.

The designs of other significant characters, such as Robin, Batgirl and Nightwing, as well as Batman's numerous enemies (e.g., The Joker, Two-Face, and The Penguin) and allies (e.g., Alfred Pennyworth and Commissioner Gordon), are also explored in detail. The book also goes into the architecture of Gotham City and Batman's various vehicles, and provides a detailed look at the show's overall visual flair, such as the episodes' title cards. Various pieces of merchandising related to the series are also featured. The book has numerous fold-out pages that display larger images. As is common with coffee table books, visual design is heavily emphasized throughout the full-color book and numerous pages are dedicated to the artwork from the series.

In addition to the plentiful visual elements, the book also contains detailed background information and anecdotes from the series' history, development and production, as well as comments from the various series creators and voice actors. It discusses various production problems ranging from technical challenges to the constant struggle between the creators and the network's censors over whether specific scenes of action and dialogue were too intense. Batman Animated also goes over the creation of the two animated spin-off films, Mask of the Phantasm and Sub-Zero.

The book's author, Paul Dini, was a writer and the co-producer for Batman: The Animated Series. The designer, Chip Kidd, was also the author and designer of another book, Batman Collected, about Batman collectibles. Batman Animated also features an introduction by Bruce Timm as well as an ending by Paul Dini describing their then-upcoming series Batman Beyond.
