= Eisner Awards =

American comic book award

- Awarded for: Creative achievement in American comic books
- Location: San Diego Comic-Con
- Country: United States
- First award: 1988; 38 years ago
- Website: www.comic-con.org/awards/eisner-awards/

The Will Eisner Comic Industry Awards, commonly shortened to the Eisner Awards, are awards for creative achievement in American comic books. They are regarded as the most prestigious and significant awards in the comic industry and often referred to as the industry's equivalent of the Academy Awards.

The first Eisners were conferred in 1988, for works published in 1987. The Eisner Awards ceremony has been held at San Diego Comic-Con every year since 1991. The awards are named in honor of pioneering cartoonist and writer Will Eisner, who was a regular participant in the ceremony until his death in 2005.

The nominations in each category are generated by a five- to six-member jury, then voted on by comic book professionals. The jury often consists of at least one comics retailer, one librarian (since 2005), and one academic researcher, among other comic experts. As of 2021, awards are presented in 32 categories.

== History ==
The Eisner Awards and Harvey Awards were first conferred in 1988, both created in response to the discontinuation of the Kirby Awards in 1987. Dave Olbrich started the non-profit organization.

There was no Eisner Awards ceremony, or awards distributed, in 1990, due to widespread balloting mix-ups. The previous administrator, Dave Olbrich, left the position, and Jackie Estrada has been the award administrator since 1990. The Eisner Awards ceremony has been held at San Diego Comic-Con every year since 1991.

In 2006, it was announced that the archives of the Eisner Awards would be housed at the James Branch Cabell Library of Virginia Commonwealth University in Richmond, Virginia.

== Categories ==
Awards are currently presented in 32 categories for works published in the previous year.

=== Current ===
List of current Eisner Award categories
Year introduced	Category
1993	Best Short Story
1988 (Note: Not awarded in 2009.)	Best Single Issue/One-Shot
1988	Best Continuing Series
1988	Best Limited Series
1988	Best New Series
2012	Best Publication for Early Readers
2008	Best Publication for Kids
2008	Best Publication for Teens
1992	Best Humor Publication
1992	Best Anthology
2006	Best Reality-Based Work
2021	Best Graphic Memoir
1991	Best Graphic Album—New
1991	Best Graphic Album—Reprint
2013 (Note: Not awarded in 2015 or 2017.)	Best Adaptation from Another Medium
1998	Best U.S. Edition of International Material
2010	Best U.S. Edition of International Material—Asia
2006	Best Archival Collection/Project—Strips
2006	Best Archival Collection/Project—Comic Books
1988	Best Writer
1988	Best Writer/Artist
1994	Best Penciller/Inker or Penciller/Inker Team
1993 (Note: Not awarded in 2012.)	Best Painter/Digital Artist
1992	Best Cover Artist
1992	Best Coloring
1993	Best Lettering
2008	Best Comics-Related Periodical/Journalism
1992	Best Comics-Related Book
2012	Best Academic/Scholarly Work
1993	Best Publication Design
2005	Best Digital Comic
2017	Best Webcomic

=== Past awards ===
List of discontinued Eisner Award categories
Year introduced	Discontinued	Category
1988	1989	Best Graphic Album
1988	1989	Best Art Team
1988	1991	Best Black-and-White Series
1992	1999	Best Editor
1992 (Note: Not awarded in 1993.)	2002	Best Comics-Related Product/Item
1992 (Note: Not awarded in 2001.)	2007	Best Comics-Related Periodical/Publication
1993	2005	Best Archival Collection/Project
1993	2006	Best Serialized Story
1995	2006	Talent Deserving of Wider Recognition
1995	2008	Best Writer/Artist-Humor
1996	2007	Best Title for Younger Readers / Younger Audience
1999	1999	Best Comics-Related Sculpted Figures
2003	2003	Best Comics-Related Publication (Periodical or Book)
2007	2009	Best U.S. Edition of International Material–Japan
2007	2008	Special Recognition
2010	2010	Best Writer/Artist–Nonfiction
2010	2011	Best Adaptation from Another Work

== See also ==
Other comic-related awards given at San Diego Comic-Con:

- Inkpot Award (1974–present)
- Russ Manning Promising Newcomer Award (1982–present)
- Kirby Award (1985–1987)
- The Bill Finger Award For Excellence In Comic Book Writing (2005–present)

Other comics-related awards:

- Alley Award
- Eagle Award
- GLAAD Media Award for Outstanding Comic Book
- Harvey Award
- Ignatz Award
- Inkwell Awards
- National Comics Award
- Ringo Award
- Shazam Award
