= Eisner Award for Best Art Team =

American comic book award

- Awarded for: Best Art Team
- Country: United States
- First award: 1988
- Website: www.comic-con.org/awards/eisner-awards/

The Eisner Award for Best Art Team was an award for "creative achievement" in American comic books. It was given out in 1988 and 1989. The award was dropped in 1991 because no nominee received more than two votes.

The successor award is the Eisner Award for Best Penciller/Inker or Penciller/Inker Team, which has been given out since 1993.

== Winners and nominees ==
Year	Nominee	Titles	Ref.
1980s
1988	Steve Rude, Willie Blyberg, Ken Steacy	Space Ghost Special (Comico)	
1988	Denys Cowan and Rick Magyar	The Question (DC Comics)	
1988	Paul Gulacy and Willie Blyberg	Valkyrie (Eclipse Comics)	
1988	Kevin Maguire and Al Gordon	Justice League International #1 (DC Comics)	
1988	Arnold Pander, Jacob Pander, and Jay Geldof	Grendel (Comico)	
1989	Alan Davis and Paul Neary	Excalibur (Marvel Comics)	
1989	Denys Cowan and Rick Magyar	The Question (DC Comics)	
1989	Jay Geldof, John K. Snyder, and Joe Matt	Grendel (Comico)	
1989	Arnold Pander and Jacob Pander	Ginger Fox (Comico)	
1989	John Romita, Jr. and Al Williamson	Daredevil (Marvel)	
1989	Dave Sim and Gerhard	Cerebus (Aardvark-Vanaheim)	
