= Eisner Award for Best Penciller/Inker or Penciller/Inker Team =

American comic book award

- Awarded for: Best Penciller/Inker or Penciller/Inker Team for Comic Books
- Country: United States
- First award: 1993
- Most recent winner: Javier Rodriguez
- Website: www.comic-con.org/awards/eisner-awards-current-info

The Eisner Award for Best Penciller/Inker or Penciller/Inker Team is an award for "creative achievement" in American comic books. It is awarded to an individual or team involved with pencilling and inking a comic.

== Award merging and name changes ==
In 1993 two awards were given out: "Best Penciller/Inker, Black & White Publication" and "Best Penciller/Inker, Color Publication." These awards were merged in 1994 after one year. Since then the official name of the award has changed depending on the nominees. It has been "Best Penciller/Inker" 5 times (1996, 2005, 2006, 2013, 2015, ) and "Best Penciller/Inker or Penciller/Inker Team" 22 times (1994-1995, 1997–2004, 2007–2012, 2014, 2016–present).

== Related awards ==
The Eisner Awards have presented separate awards for "Best Penciller" and "Best Inker," though neither has been awarded since the 1990s.

== Winners and nominees ==
=== Best Penciller/Inker, Black & White Publication ===
Year	Nominee	Titles	Ref.
1993	Frank Miller	"Sin City" in Dark Horse Presents (Dark Horse Comics)	
1993	Mike Allred	Madman (Tundra Publishing)	
1993	Daniel Clowes	Eightball (Fantagraphics Books)	
1993	Jaime Hernandez	Love and Rockets (Fantagraphics Books)	
1993	Jon J Muth	The Mythology of an Abandoned City (Tundra Publishing)	
1993	Mark Schultz	Xenozoic Tales (Kitchen Sink Press)	
1993	Eric Shanower	"An Accidental Death" in Dark Horse Presents (Dark Horse Comics)	
1993	Dave Sim and Gerhard	Cerebus (Aardvark-Vanaheim)	

=== Best Penciller/Inker, Color Publication ===
Year	Nominee	Titles	Ref.
1993	P. Craig Russell	Fairy Tales of Oscar Wilde (NBM Publishing), Robin 3000 (DC Comics), "Hothouse" in Batman: Legends of the Dark Knight (DC Comics)	
1993	Kelley Jones	Deadman: Exorcism (DC Comics)	
1993	Steve Pugh	Animal Man (DC Comics)	
1993	Bryan Talbot	"Mask" in Batman: Legends of the Dark Knight (DC Comics)	
1993	Matt Wagner	"Faces" in Batman: Legends of the Dark Knight (DC Comics)	

=== Best Penciller/Inker or Penciller/Inker Team ===
Year	Nominee	Titles	Ref.
1990s
1994	P. Craig Russell	The Sandman #50 (DC Comics/Vertigo Comics)	
1994	Chris Bachalo and Mark Buckingham	Death: The High Cost of Living (DC Comics/Vertigo Comics)	
1994	Mike Mignola and Kevin Nowlan	Aliens: Salvation (Dark Horse Comics)	
1994	John Romita Jr. and Al Williamson	Daredevil: The Man Without Fear (Marvel Comics)	
1994	Dave Sim and Gerhard	Cerebus (Aardvark-Vanaheim)	
1994	Chris Sprouse and Karl Story	Legionnaires (DC Comics)	
1994	Bruce Timm	The Batman Adventures: Mad Love (DC Comics)	
1995	Dave Gibbons	Martha Washington Goes to War (Dark Horse Comics)	
1995	Edvin Biuković	Grendel Tales: Devils and Deaths (Dark Horse Comics)	
1995	Tony Harris and Wade von Grawbadger	Starman (DC Comics)	
1995	David Mazzucchelli	Paul Auster's City of Glass (Avon Books)	
1995	Mike Parobeck and Rick Burchett	The Batman Adventures (DC Comics)	
1995	P. Craig Russell	Fairy Tales of Oscar Wilde, vol. 2 (NBM Publishing)	
1996	Geof Darrow	The Big Guy and Rusty the Boy Robot (Dark Horse Comics)	
1996	Steve Dillon	Preacher (DC Comics/Vertigo Comics)	
1996	Milo Manara	El Gaucho (NBM Publishing)	
1996	Al Williamson	Flash Gordon (Marvel Select)	
1996	Michael Zulli	The Sandman #70-72: "The Wake" (DC Comics/Vertigo Comics)	
1997	Charles Vess	The Book of Ballads and Sagas (Green Man Press), The Sandman #75 (DC Comics/Vertigo Comics)	
1997	Brent Anderson/Will Blyberg	Kurt Busiek's Astro City vol. 2 (Jukebox Productions/Homage Comics)	
1997	Tony Harris/Wade von Grawbadger	Starman (DC Comics)	
1997	José Luis García-López/Kevin Nowlan	Dr. Strangefate (DC Comics)	
1997	Paul Smith	Leave It to Chance (Homage Comics)	
1997	Aron Weisenfeld/Richard Bennett	Deathblow/Wolverine (WildStorm/Image Comics/Marvel Comics)	
1998	P. Craig Russell	Elric: Stormbringer (Dark Horse Comics/Topps Comics), Dr. Strange: What Is It That Disturbs You, Stephen? (Marvel Comics)	
1998	Brent Anderson/Will Blyberg	Kurt Busiek's Astro City (Jukebox Productions/Homage Comics)	
1998	Rick Burchett/Terry Austin (Note: Rich Burchett was the sole artist on Batgirl Adventures.)	Batgirl Adventures (DC Comics), Superman Adventures (DC Comics)	
1998	Dave Gibbons	Martha Washington Saves the World #1 (Dark Horse Comics)	
1998	Michael Lark	Terminal City: Aerial Graffiti (DC Comics/Vertigo Comics), The Little Sister (Byron Priess Visual Productions)	
1998	Paul Smith	Leave It to Chance (Homage Comics)	
1999	Tim Sale	Superman for All Seasons (DC Comics), Grendel Black, White, and Red #1 (Dark Horse Comics)	
1999	Claudio Castellini	"Predator: Demon's Gold" in Dark Horse Presents #137 (Dark Horse Comics)	
1999	Gene Ha	Starman #46 (DC Comics)	
1999	Steve Lieber	Whiteout (Oni Press)	
1999	George Pérez/Al Vey	Avengers (Marvel Comics)	
2000s
2000	Kevin Nowlan	"Jack B. Quick" in Tomorrow Stories (America's Best Comics)	
2000	Travis Charest/Richard Friend	WildC.A.T.S. (DC Comics/WildStorm)	
2000	Ricardo Delgado	Hieroglyph (Dark Horse Maverick)	
2000	Gary Gianni	Gary Gianni's The Monstermen (Dark Horse Maverick)	
2000	Gene Ha	Top 10 (America's Best Comics)	
2000	J. H. Williams III/Mick Gray	Promethea (America's Best Comics)	
2001	P. Craig Russell	Ring of the Nibelung (Dark Horse Maverick)	
2001	Michael Avon Oeming	Powers (Image Comics)	
2001	Frank Quitely/Trevor Scott	The Authority (WildStorm/DC Comics)	
2001	Eduardo Risso	100 Bullets (Vertigo Comics/DC Comics)	
2001	J. H. Williams III/Mick Gray	Promethea (America's Best Comics)	
2002	Eduardo Risso	100 Bullets (Vertigo Comics/DC Comics)	
2002	John Cassaday	Planetary (DC Comics/WildStorm)	
2002	Butch Guice	Ruse (CrossGen)	
2002	Gene Ha/Zander Cannon	Top 10 (America's Best Comics)	
2002	Humberto Ramos/Sandra Hope	Out There (DC Comics/WildStorm)	
2002	François Schuiten	Brüsel (NBM Publishing)	
2003	Kevin O'Neill	The League of Extraordinary Gentlemen (America's Best Comics)	
2003	Seth Fisher	Vertigo Pop: Tokyo (DC Comics/Vertigo Comics), The Flash: Time Flies (DC Comics)	
2003	Bryan Hitch/Andrew Currie	The Ultimates (Marvel Comics)	
2003	Michael Lark	Batman: Nine Lives (DC Comics), Gotham Central (DC Comics)	
2003	J. H. Williams III/Mick Gray	Promethea (America's Best Comics)	
2004	John Cassaday	Planetary (WildStorm/DC Comics), Planetary/Batman: Night on Earth (WildStorm/DC Comics), Hellboy: Weird Tales (Dark Horse Comics)	
2004	Tan Eng Huat	Doom Patrol (DC Comics), JLA #91 (DC Comics)	
2004	Alex Maleev	Daredevil (Marvel Comics)	
2004	Jim Lee/Scott Williams	Batman (DC Comics)	
2004	Eduardo Risso	100 Bullets (Vertigo Comics/DC Comics), Batman (DC Comics), Boy Vampire: The Resurrection (Strip Art Features)	
2005	John Cassaday (Note: There was a tie between John Cassaday and Frank Quitely in 2005.)	Astonishing X-Men (Marvel Comics), Planetary (WildStorm/DC Comics), I Am Legion: The Dancing Faun (Humanoids Publishing/DC Comics)	
2005	Frank Quitely	We3 (Vertigo Comics/DC Comics)	
2005	Charlie Adlard	The Walking Dead (Image Comics)	
2005	Geof Darrow	Shaolin Cowboy (Burlyman Entertainment)	
2005	Cary Nord & Thomas Yeates	Conan (Dark Horse Comics)	
2006	John Cassaday	Astonishing X-Men (Marvel Comics), Planetary (WildStorm/DC Comics)	
2006	Gene Ha	Top 10: The Forty-Niners (America's Best Comics)	
2006	J. G. Jones	Wanted (Top Cow Productions/Image Comics)	
2006	Frank Quitely	All-Star Superman (DC Comics)	
2006	J. H. Williams III	Promethea (America's Best Comics), Desolation Jones (WildStorm/DC Comics)	
2007	Mark Buckingham/Steve Leialoha	Fables (Vertigo Comics/DC Comics)	
2007	Tony Harris/Tom Feister	Ex Machina (WildStorm/DC Comics)	
2007	Niko Henrichon	Pride of Baghdad (Vertigo Comics/DC Comics)	
2007	Michael Lark/Stefano Gaudiano	Daredevil (Marvel Comics)	
2007	Sonny Liew	Wonderland (Slave Labor Graphics)	
2007	Steve McNiven/Dexter Vines	Civil War (Marvel Comics)	
2008	Pia Guerra/José Marzan Jr.	Y: The Last Man (Vertigo Comics/DC Comics)	
2008	Steve Epting/Butch Guice/Mike Perkins	Captain America (Marvel Comics)	
2008	Jae Lee	The Dark Tower: The Gunslinger Born (Marvel Comics)	
2008	Takeshi Obata	Death Note (Viz Media), Hikaru no Go (Viz Media)	
2008	Ethan Van Sciver	Green Lantern: The Sinestro Corps (DC Comics)	
2009	Guy Davis	B.P.R.D. (Dark Horse Comics)	
2009	Gabriel Bá	The Umbrella Academy (Dark Horse Comics)	
2009	Mark Buckingham/Steve Leialoha	Fables (Vertigo Comics/DC Comics)	
2009	Olivier Coipel/Mark Morales	Thor (Marvel Comics)	
2009	Amy Reeder Hadley/Richard Friend	Madame Xanadu (Vertigo Comics/DC Comics)	
2009	Jillian Tamaki	Skim (Groundwood Books)	
2010s
2010	J. H. Williams III	Detective Comics (DC Comics)	
2010	Michael Kaluta	Madame Xanadu #11-15: "Exodus Noir" (Vertigo Comics/DC Comics)	
2010	Steve McNiven/Dexter Vines	Wolverine: Old Man Logan (Marvel Comics)	
2010	Fiona Staples	North 40 (WildStorm)	
2010	Danijel Žeželj	Luna Park (Vertigo Comics/DC Comics)	
2011	Skottie Young	The Marvelous Land of Oz (Marvel Comics)	
2011	Richard Corben	Hellboy (Dark Horse Comics)	
2011	Stephen DeStefano	Lucky in Love: A Poor Man's History, vol. 1 (Fantagraphics Books)	
2011	Rob Guillory	Chew (Image Comics)	
2011	Gabriel Rodriguez	Locke & Key (IDW Publishing)	
2012	Ramón K. Pérez	Jim Henson’s Tale of Sand (Archaia Entertainment)	
2012	Mike Allred	iZombie (Vertigo Comics/DC Comics), Madman All-New Giant-Size Super-Ginchy Special (Image Comics)	
2012	Chris Samnee	Captain America and Bucky (Marvel Comics), Ultimate Spider-Man #155 (Marvel Comics)	
2012	Marcos Martín	Daredevil (Marvel Comics)	
2012	Paolo Rivera/Joe Rivera	Daredevil (Marvel Comics)	
2013	David Aja (Note: There was a tie between David Aja and Chris Samnee in 2013.)	Hawkeye (Marvel Comics)	
2013	Chris Samnee	Daredevil (Marvel Comics), The Rocketeer: Cargo of Doom (IDW Publishing)	
2013	Becky Cloonan	Conan the Barbarian (Dark Horse Comics), The Mire (self-published)	
2013	Colleen Coover	Bandette (MonkeyBrain Books)	
2013	Sean Phillips	Fatale (Image Comics)	
2013	Joseph Remnant	Harvey Pekar's Cleveland (ZIP Comics/Top Shelf Productions)	
2014	Sean Murphy	The Wake (DC Comics/Vertigo Comics)	
2014	Nate Bellegarde	Nowhere Men (Image Comics)	
2014	Nick Dragotta	East of West (Image Comics)	
2014	Nate Powell	March: Book One (Top Shelf Productions)	
2014	Emma Ríos	Pretty Deadly (Image Comics)	
2014	Thomas Yeates	Law of the Desert Born (Bantam Books)	
2015	Fiona Staples	Saga (Image Comics)	
2015	Adrian Alphona	Ms. Marvel (Marvel Comics)	
2015	Mike Allred	Silver Surfer (Marvel Comics), Madman in Your Face 3D Special (Image Comics)	
2015	Frank Quitely	The Multiversity (DC Comics)	
2015	François Schuiten	The Leaning Girl (Alaxis Press)	
2015	Babs Tarr	Batgirl (DC Comics)	
2016	Cliff Chiang	Paper Girls (Image Comics)	
2016	Mike Allred	Silver Surfer (Marvel Comics), Art Ops (Vertigo Comics/DC Comics)	
2016	Erica Henderson	Jughead (Archie Comics), The Unbeatable Squirrel Girl (Marvel Comics)	
2016	Joëlle Jones	Lady Killer (Dark Horse Comics), Brides of Helheim (Oni Press)	
2016	Nate Powell	March: Book Two (Top Shelf Productions)	
2017	Fiona Staples	Saga (Image Comics)	
2017	Mark Brooks	Han Solo (Marvel Comics)	
2017	Dan Mora	Klaus (Boom! Studios)	
2017	Greg Ruth	Indeh: A Story of the Apache Wars (Grand Central Publishing)	
2017	François Schuiten	The Theory of Grain and Sand (IDW Publishing)	
2017	Brian Stelfreeze	Black Panther (Marvel Comics)	
2018	Mitch Gerads	Mister Miracle (DC Comics)	
2018	Isabelle Arsenault	Louis Undercover (Groundwood Books/House of Anansi Press)	
2018	Gary Gianni	Hellboy: Into the Silent Sea (Dark Horse Comics)	
2018	Ramón K. Pérez	Jane (Archaia Entertainment)	
2018	David Rubín	Black Hammer #9 & #12 (Dark Horse Comics), Ether (Dark Horse Comics), Sherlock Frankenstein #1–3 (Dark Horse Comics), Beowulf (Image Comics)	
2019	Mitch Gerads	Mister Miracle (DC Comics)	
2019	Matías Bergara	Coda (Boom! Studios)	
2019	Karl Kerschl	Isola (Image Comics)	
2019	Sonny Liew	Eternity Girl (DC Comics)	
2019	Sean Phillips	Kill or be Killed (Image Comics), My Heroes Have Always Been Junkies (Image Comics)	
2019	Yanick Paquette	Wonder Woman: Earth One, vol. 2 (DC Comics)	
2020s
2020	Rosemary Valero-O'Connell	Laura Dean Keeps Breaking Up with Me (First Second Books/Macmillan Publishers)	
2020	Ian Bertram	Little Bird (Image Comics)	
2020	Colleen Doran	Snow, Glass, Apples (Dark Horse Comics)	
2020	Bilquis Evely	The Dreaming (DC Comics)	
2020	Simon Gane	Ghost Tree (IDW Publishing)	
2020	Steve Pugh	Harley Quinn: Breaking Glass (DC Comics)	
2021	Mike Allred	Bowie: Stardust, Rayguns & Moonage Daydreams (Insight Editions)	
2021	Marco Checchetto	Daredevil (Marvel Comics)	
2021	Jorge Corona	Middlewest (Image Comics)	
2021	Bertrand Gatignol	Pistouvi (Magnetic Press)	
2021	Mitch Gerads/Evan “Doc” Shaner	Strange Adventures (DC Black Label)	
2021	Sanford Greene	Bitter Root (Image Comics)	
2022	Phil Jimenez	Wonder Woman Historia: The Amazons (DC Comics)	
2022	Filipe Andrade	The Many Deaths of Laila Starr (Boom! Studios)	
2022	Bruno Redondo	Nightwing (DC Comics)	
2022	Esad Ribić	Eternals (Marvel Comics)	
2022	P. Craig Russell	Norse Mythology (comics) (Dark Horse Comics)	
2023	Greg Smallwood	The Human Target (DC)	
2023	Jason Shaw Alexander	Killadelphia, Nita Hawes' Nightmare Blog (Image)	
2023	Alvaro Martínez Bueno	The Nice One on the Lake (DC)	
2023	Sean Phillips	Follow Me Down, The Ghost in You (Image)	
2023	Bruno Redondo	Nightwing (DC)	
2024	Jillian Tamaki	Roaming	
2024	Jason Shaw Alexander	Detective Comics (DC), Killadelphia (Image)	
2024	Tula Lotay	Barnstormers: A Ballad of Love and Murder (Comixology Originals/Best Jackett)	
2024	Inaki Miranda	Gozilla: Here There Be Dragons (IDW)	
2024	Dan Mora	Batman/Superman: World's Finest, Shazam (DC)	
2024	Chris Samnee	Fire Power (Image Skybound)	
2025	Bilquis Evely	Helen of Wyndhorn (Dark Horse)	
2025	Felipe Andrade	Rare Flavours (BOOM! Studios)	
2025	Nick Dragotta	Absolute Batman (DC)	
2025	Manu Larcenet	The Road (Abrams ComicArts)	
2025	Javier Rodriguez	Zatanna: Bring Down the House (DC)	
2025	LeUyen Pham	Lunar New Year Love Story (First Second/Macmillan)	
2026	Javier Rodriguez	Absolute Martian Manhunter (DC)	
2026	Elsa Charretier	The City Beneath Her Feet (DSTLRY)	
2026	Sean Phillips	Giant Size Criminal #1, The Knives: A Criminal Book (Image)	
2026	Chris Samnee	Batman and Robin: Year One (DC)	
2026	Hayden Sherman	Absolute Wonder Woman, Batman: Dark Patterns (DC)	
2026	Eric Zawadzki	Assorted Crisis Events (Image)	

== Multiple awards and nominations ==
The following individuals have won Best Penciller/Inker or Penciller/Inker Team two or more times. When an individual has won or been nominated as part of a team that has been noted.

Artist	Wins	Nominations
P. Craig Russell (Note: Includes win for "Best Penciller/Inker, Color Publication" in 1993.)	4	5
John Cassaday	3	4
Fiona Staples	2	3
Mitch Gerads (Note: Won by self in 2018 & 2019. Nominated with Eric "Doc" Shaner in 2021.)	2	3

The following individuals have received two or more nominations but never won Best Penciller/Inker or Penciller/Inker Team. When an individual has been nominated as part of a team that has been noted.

Artist	Nominations
Gene Ha (Note: With Zander Cannon in 2002.)	4
Sean Phillips	4
François Schuiten	3
Michael Lark (Note: With Stefano Gaudiano in 2007.)	3
Mick Gray (Note: With J. H. Williams III in 2000, 2001, & 2003.)	3
Tony Harris (Note: With Wade von Grawbadger in 1995 & 1997 and with Tom Feister in 2007.)	3
Al Williamson (Note: With John Romita Jr. in 1994.)	2
Brent Anderson (Note: With Will Blyberg in 1997 & 1998.)	2
Butch Guice (Note: With Steve Epting & Mike Perkins in 2008.)	2
Dexter Vines (Note: With Steve McNiven in 2007 & 2010.)	2
Gary Gianni	2
Nate Powell	2
Paul Smith	2
Richard Friend (Note: With José Marzan Jr. in 2008.)	2
Rick Burchett (Note: With Mike Parobeck in 1995 and Terry Austin in 1998.)	2
Sonny Liew	2
Steve McNiven (Note: With Dexter Vines in 2007 & 2010.)	2
Thomas Yeates (Note: With Cary Nord in 2005.)	2
Wade von Grawbadger (Note: With Tony Harris in 1995 & 1997.)	2
Will Blyberg (Note: With Brent Anderson in 1997 & 1998.)	2
Dave Sim (Note: Nominated with Gerhard in 1994. Includes nomination for "Best Penciller/Inker, Black & White Publication" with Gerhard in 1993.)	2
Gerhard (Note: Nominated with Dave Sim in 1994. Includes nomination for "Best Penciller/Inker, Black & White Publication" with Dave Sim in 1993.)	2
Steve Pugh (Note: Includes nomination for "Best Penciller/Inker, Color Publication" in 1993.)	2
Nick Dragotta	2
Bruno Redondo	2
Dan Mora	2
