= John K. Snyder III =

American comic book writer and illustrator

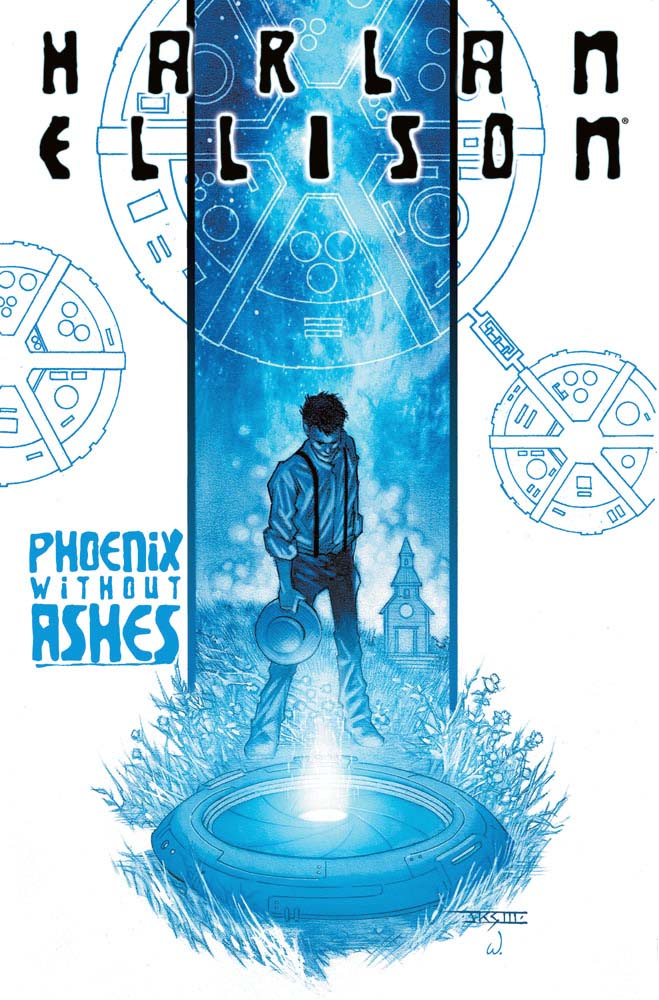
- Born: July 14, 1961 (age 65)
- Areas: Writer, Artist
- Notable works: Lawrence Block's Eight Million Ways To Die; Fashion In Action; Doctor Mid-Nite; Suicide Squad; Grendel; Classics Illustrated; Leo Kragg: The Prowler

John K. Snyder III (born July 14, 1961) is a writer and illustrator of comic books and graphic novels. His work has been published in the pages of the underground press, most notably The Duckberg Times, and by independent comic book publishers, including Grendel for Dark Horse Comics. At DC Comics, Snyder has worked on titles such as Suicide Squad, Doctor Mid-Nite, Green Lantern, and Mister E. Snyder's latest project is as adapter/artist of the graphic novel adaptation of Lawrence Block's detective noir novel, 8 Million Ways to Die.

== Career ==
Snyder wrote and drew his first project, Fashion in Action, published by Eclipse Comics as a backup feature in Timothy Truman's Scout in 1985, and then as a series of specials in 1986 and 1987. During this time he began to illustrate gallery pieces and covers for books such as Comico's Jonny Quest comic book series and Alan Moore's Miracleman. He worked with Timothy Truman and Michael H. Price on Leo Kragg: The Prowler for Eclipse Comics. Snyder gained notoriety shortly thereafter with his work on Matt Wagner's Grendel series, illustrating "The God and The Devil" story arc, later re-issued and collected by Dark Horse Comics. Snyder then moved to DC Comics' Suicide Squad, written by John Ostrander and Kim Yale, most notably contributing to the "Janus Directive" storyline. It was shortly after Snyder's completion of the Suicide Squad run that he adapted and illustrated Dr. Jekyll & Mr. Hyde and Joseph Conrad's The Secret Agent for First Comics and Berkley Books.

Snyder then returned to DC Comics to work on Mister E, a Books of Magic spin-off four-issue mini-series, written by founding cyber/steampunk writer K. W. Jeter. Snyder continued to draw comic book covers and short stories, working with Harlan Ellison on producing a duo of covers for Ellison's Edgeworks series (White Wolf), volume II of which was featured in the fourth Spectrum Illustration Annual. Snyder and writer Matt Wagner re-imagined the DC Comics Golden Age character Doctor Mid-Nite (Pieter Cross) for a three-issue prestige format series in 1999, which was later collected. Wagner and Snyder also co-created Lady Zorro for Dynamite Entertainment in 2012.

Snyder has also illustrated numerous trading and gaming cards for various companies, including Topps, WildStorm, Upper Deck, White Wolf Publishing, and the Last Unicorn Games' collectible card game Heresy: Kingdom Come.

In 2010, Snyder produced covers for the IDW graphic novel adaptation of Harlan Ellison's Phoenix Without Ashes. Snyder's first work, Fashion In Action, was restored by the creator/artist and collected by Bedside Press in 2017. Leo Kragg: The Prowler has also been restored and collected in two volumes by Cremo Press. Snyder's most recent work is adapting and illustrating the graphic novel adaptation of Lawrence Block's noir classic novel, Eight Million Ways to Die, also featuring Block's world-famous detective, Matthew Scudder, published by IDW in June 2018.

== Awards and nominations ==
Snyder was a 1989 Eisner Award nominee, in the category of Best Art Team.

Preceded by Tim Sale	Grendel penciller 1988–1989	Succeeded by Jay Geldhof
Preceded by Grant Miehm	Suicide Squad penciller 1989–1990	Succeeded by Luke McDonnell
