= Pander Brothers =

Jacob Pander (born January 26, 1965) and Arnold Pander (born June 16, 1967), known commercially as The Pander Brothers, are American comic book creators, artists, and filmmakers. They are best known for their work on the comics titles Grendel: Devil's Legacy, Batman: City of Light, The Batman Chronicles, and Girlfiend.

== Career ==
=== Comics ===
The Pander Brothers first came to prominence with their artwork on Matt Wagner's Grendel [Volume Two] issues 1-12 (collected as Grendel: Devil's Legacy), from Comico. They later illustrated the 1990 series Exquisite Corpse, from Dark Horse Comics written by Jerry Prosser about the tragic and violent life of a serial killer. The three-issue series can be read in any order; depending on the order the reader chooses, they are left with varying impressions of the main character. Also in 1990, Jacob and Arnold illustrated Badger #59, which was written by Mike Baron and published by First.

In 1994, they released Triple-X International, a comic series from Dark Horse. It tells the story of a young American dissident hiding out in futuristic Amsterdam to avoid persecution after New York City falls under martial law, only to find that his refuge is about to explode into revolution. Triple-X was re-released in 1997 as a collected graphic novel.

In 1997, Arnold Pander illustrated Jack Zero, a short story series from Dark Horse. The five-part series appeared in Dark Horse Presents 121-125 and was co-authored by New York performance artist Joel Blumsack (aka Zeroboy).

The following year, in 1998, the brothers released the Secret Broadcast comic, which included CD soundtrack companion, with Oni Press. Originally printed in Oni Double Feature #1&2, Secret Broadcast combined story and music to tell the story of a pirate radio broadcaster on the run from the FCC. The track numbers in the panels of the comics corresponded to tracks on the companion soundtrack. The book went through three printings, and music videos from the CD appeared on MTV AMP. It was originally released in print with Jay and Silent Bob by Matt Wagner.

In 1999, the Panders wrote and illustrated a short story for DC Comics' "Elseworlds" title Batman Chronicles, entitled "Apocalypse Girl." Batman must track down a girl from an anti-matter dimension who destroys anything that comes into contact with her.

The Panders illustrated the four issue miniseries Accelerate from DC/Vertigo in 2000. Written by sci-fi novelist Richard Kadrey, the comic explores a speculative future Los Angeles where marginalized citizens have become "Tribes" in an economically polarized society. Accelerate was reprinted as a graphic novel in 2007 through Image Comics and was remastered in 2014 for digital release on Comixology.

In 2004, the Pander Brothers co-authored the eight-issue miniseries Batman: City of Light for DC Comics with writer Mark Paniccia. In the story, illustrated by the Panders with inks by Alvaro Lopez, Batman goes into hiatus after the fatal injury of a young man.

In 2009, Arnold Pander co-authored and illustrated the graphic novel Tasty Bullet for Image Comics. Co-authored by conspiracy theory historian Jonathan Vankin, Tasty Bullet is an exploration of the darker underbelly of product testing, fame building, and corporate espionage. The Pander Brothers promoted the book by creating an ARG (Alternate Reality Game) involving a hacked website, blogs written by “relatives” of victims suffering from the drink's side effects, a militant anti-Tasty Bullet site devoted to revealing the conspiracy, and YouTube videos of "real" ads from Japan, Eastern Europe, and India featuring the original 1990s drink "Tasty" that inspired the graphic novel.

In 2012, a remastered digital version of the Secret Broadcast comic with additional story was released on Comixology, along with a new soundtrack called Secret Broadcast Redux that was released digitally on DECOY Recordings through InGrooves/Fontana.

In 2015, the brothers returned to comics with Girlfiend, a graphic novel released by Dark Horse Comics. The 270-page romance horror follows the story of a runaway vampire named Karina and her mortal lover Nick who hunt down the criminal underworld to keep Karina fed and appease Nick's ethical boundaries.

During their comics career, the Pander Brothers have been nominated for several awards, including the Eisner Award for Best Art Team in 1988 and 1989.

=== Film ===
The brothers' film work includes music videos, narrative shorts, and the 2008 feature film Selfless, which premiered at the BendFilm Festival where it took top honors including Best Picture, Best Screenplay, Best Supporting Actor (Mo Gallini), and Best Editing. It also won Best Cinematography at the Albuquerque Film Festival in 2009.

In 2015, they released the short film Subtext, in which all of the film's dialogue takes place over texting between the film's characters. The Panders debuted the short online at the 2015 TechFest Northwest in Portland, Oregon, in August 2015.
