= Eisner Award for Best Inker =

American comic book award

Eisner Award for Inker
- Awarded for: Best Inker
- Country: United States
- First award: 1991
- Website: www.comic-con.org/awards/eisner-awards/

The Eisner Award for Best Inker was an award for "creative achievement" in American comic books. It was given out in 1991, 1992, 1993, and 1997.

The successor award is the Eisner Award for Best Penciller/Inker or Penciller/Inker Team, which has been given out since 1993.

== Winners and nominees ==
Year	Nominee	Titles	Ref.
1990s
1991 (Note: Nominees for Inker did not have associated titles in 1991.)	Al Williamson		
1991	Terry Austin		
1991	Gerhard		
1991	Karl Kesel		
1992	Adam Kubert	Batman Versus Predator (DC Comics and Dark Horse Comics)	
1992	Terry Austin	Wonder Man (Marvel Comics) and The Infinity Gauntlet (Marvel Comics)	
1992	Mark Farmer	The Incredible Hulk (Marvel Comics)	
1992	Karl Kesel	Indiana Jones and the Fate of Atlantis (Dark Horse Comics), Terminator: Secondary Objectives (Dark Horse Comics)	
1992	Art Thibert	Uncanny X-Men (Marvel Comics)	
1993	Kevin Nowlan	Batman: Sword of Azrael (DC Comics)	
1993	John Nyberg	Bram Stoker's Dracula (Topps Comics)	
1993	Mark Pennington	Shade, the Changing Man (DC Comics)	
1993	P. Craig Russell	Ironwolf: Fires of the Revolution (DC Comics)	
1993	Matt Wagner	Grendel: War Child (Dark Horse Comics)	
1993	Scott Williams	X-Men (Marvel Comics), WildC.A.T.S (Image Comics)	
1994–1996	There was no award for Inker given out between 1994 and 1996.		
1997	Al Williamson	Spider-Man (Marvel Comics), Untold Tales of Spider-Man #17-18 (Marvel Comics)	
1997	Jimmy Palmiotti	Ash (Event Comics), Vampirella Lives (Harris Comics)	
1997	George Pérez	Teen Titans (DC Comics)	
1997	Joe Sinnott	Untold Tales of Spider-Man '96 (Marvel Comics)	
1997	Cam Smith	Supergirl (DC Comics)	
