= Mage (comics) =

American superhero comic book by Matt Wagner

- Mage: The Hero Defined cover by Matt Wagner
- Created by: Matt Wagner

Publication information
- Publisher: Comico; Image Comics
- Title(s): Mage: The Hero Discovered; Mage: The Hero Defined; Mage: The Hero Denied
- Formats: Original material for the series has been published as a set of limited series.
- Genre: Fantasy, superhero; Mythology
- Publication date: February 1984 – December 1986; July 1997 – October 1999; July 2017 – Feb 2019
- Number of issues: Discovered: 15; Defined: 16, #0–15; Denied: 16, #0–15
- Main character(s): Kevin Matchstick

Creative team
- Writer(s): Matt Wagner
- Penciller(s): Matt Wagner
- Inker(s): Matt Wagner; Sam Kieth
- Colorist(s): Matt Wagner; Jeromy Cox; Brennan Wagner
- Editor(s): Diana Schutz

Reprints
- Collected editions
- Hero Discovered Volume 1: ISBN 1-58240-388-0

Mage is an American superhero comic book written and illustrated by Matt Wagner, which he describes as an "allegorical autobiography" in which the hero, Kevin Matchstick, is a stand-in for the author, and "[a]ll the other characters he encounters and situations he endures are metaphors from my own life... told through the lens of a fantasy adventure". Three volumes, each of 15 issues, have been published.

== Publication history ==
Volume one, The Hero Discovered, was published by Comico from February 1984 to December 1986. Despite advertisements saying that a sequel was "coming soon", The Hero Defined did not appear until 1997, published by Image Comics (Comico had gone bankrupt in 1990, and it had taken some time for Wagner to regain the rights to the series). The third and final volume, The Hero Denied, began publication with an introductory "zero issue" in July 2017, with the first issue proper following in August. The final issue came out on February 27, 2019, thirty-five years after the publication of the first.

Wagner wrote and drew all three series, with Sam Kieth as inker for part of the first, Jeromy Cox as colorist for the second, and his son Brennan Wagner as colorist for the third.

== Plot synopsis ==
The Hero Discovered follows Kevin Matchstick, an alienated young man who meets a wizard called Mirth and discovers that he possesses, among other things, both a magic baseball bat and superhuman abilities. In the course of the comic, he defeats the nefarious plans of a being called the Umbra Sprite. He ultimately discovers that Mirth is Merlin, the baseball bat is Excalibur, and he is, in some ambiguous way, King Arthur. All the chapter titles are lines from Shakespeare's Hamlet.

A backup story, "Devil by the Deed", appeared in issues #6–14 of The Hero Discovered. This was a Grendel story that led directly into the Grendel comic series written by Wagner and drawn by a series of other artists.

The Hero Defined picks up Matchstick's adventures several years later as he fights supernatural menaces in the company of other heroes, including Kirby Hero and Joe Phat. Each hero he encounters is based both on a mythological character and a comics professional of Wagner's acquaintance (Kirby as Hercules and Bernie Mireault, Joe as Coyote and Joe Matt). There is a new mage this time—Mirth has disappeared, and Matchstick is followed around by an old tramp called Wally Ut, who insists he is Matchstick's new mentor. In the course of the story Matchstick learns that he has misunderstood his mission, meets his future wife, and is alienated from his fellow heroes. He also discovers that he represents more than one mythical character: he is also Gilgamesh, and Kirby is also Enkidu. The chapter titles of The Hero Defined are from Macbeth, and Matchstick's wife and her siblings are heavily based on the Weird Sisters.

The Hero Denied takes place several years after the second series. Matchstick and his family are in hiding, trying to avoid the Umbra Sprite, now known as the Umbra Witch, who has regenerated in a female form, and has female children called Gracklethorns, instead of the males in the first two series called Grackleflints. All of the chapters have titles taken from Shakespeare's The Tempest. The final issue came out on February 27, 2019, thirty-five years after the publication of the first comic.

The ultimate issue of each volume was double-sized, and featured a gatefold page of panoramic art. The final issue contains an eight-page gatefold.

Mage ran as a back up feature in Comico's Grendel series issues #16–19.

== Collected editions ==
The series has been collected into a number of trade paperbacks and a hardcover limited edition.

- Mage: The Hero Discovered: Starblaze Graphics
  - Trade Paperback
    - Volume 1 (March 1987, ISBN 978-0-89865-465-3)
    - Volume 2 (December 1987, ISBN 978-0-89865-560-5)
    - Volume 3 (June 1988, ISBN 0-89865-616-8)
  - Hardcover, Slipcased, Limited Edition of 1500
    - Volume 1 (March 1987, ISBN 0-89865-467-X)
    - Volume 2 (April 1987, ISBN 0-89865-467-X)
    - Volume 3 (May 1987, ISBN 0-89865-615-X)
- Mage: The Hero Discovered: Image Comics, paperback
  - Volume 1 (216 pages, June 2017, ISBN 978-1534303690)
  - Volume 2 (206 pages, October 2017, ISBN 978-1534303768)
- Mage: The Hero Defined:
  - Volume 3 (208 pages, January 2018, ISBN 978-1534304765)
  - Volume 4 (208 pages, May 2018, ISBN 978-1534306592)
- Mage: The Hero Denied:
  - Volume 5 (208 pages, October 2018, ISBN 978-1534304895)
  - Volume 6 (206 pages, April 2019, ISBN 978-1534310414)

== Other media ==
In June 2002, Zack Snyder took over directing a film adaptation for Walt Disney Pictures, with Spyglass Entertainment producing, after F. Gary Gray left the project to remake The Italian Job. In 2010 the rights were picked up by producer Lloyd Levin.
