= Eisner Award for Best Penciller =

American comic book award

- Awarded for: Best Penciller
- Country: United States
- First award: 1993
- Website: www.comic-con.org/awards/eisner-awards/

The Eisner Award for Best Penciller was an award for "creative achievement" in American comic books. It was given out in 1993 and 1997.

The successor award is the Eisner Award for Best Penciller/Inker or Penciller/Inker Team, which has been given out since 1993.

== Winners and nominees ==
Year	Nominee	Titles	Ref.
1990s
1993	Steve Rude	Nexus: The Origin (Dark Horse Comics)	
1993	Chris Bachalo	Shade, the Changing Man (DC Comics)	
1993	Jim Lee	X-Men (Marvel Comics), WildC.A.T.S (Image Comics)	
1993	Patrick McEown	Grendel: War Child (Dark Horse Comics)	
1993	Mike Mignola	Bram Stoker's Dracula (Topps Comics)	
1993	Joe Quesada	Batman: Sword of Azrael (DC Comics)	
1994-1996	There was no award for Penciller given out between 1994 and 1996.		
1997	Steve Rude	Nexus: Executioner's Song (Dark Horse Comics)	
1997	Ron Garney	Captain America (Marvel Comics)	
1997	Phil Jiminez	Tempest (DC Comics)	
1997	Michael Lark	Terminal City (DC Comics/Vertigo Comics)	
