= Maverick (Dark Horse) =

Defunct imprint of Dark Horse Comics

Maverick is a defunct imprint of Dark Horse Comics, created in 1999 by editor Diana Schutz for creator-owned works, to "provid[e] a home for creator-owned properties — providing a certain identity to those creator-owned labors of love that distinguishes them from Dark Horse's licensed books." The imprint, Dark Horse's second attempt at a creator-owned imprint (after "Legend"), was relatively short-lived, publishing fewer than fifty issues/titles between 1999 and 2002.

== History ==
Schutz instigated the "Maverick" line at Dark Horse Comics in July 1999 for the purpose of "provid[ing] a kind of identity or specific line for those sorts of individual creator visions." Part of the purpose of having a separate imprint was to noticeably separate Dark Horse's output into discrete sections, and as Schutz notes:

Having a section in Diamond Previews can't help but solidify that [separate] identity a little bit. It reminds people that Dark Horse really does publish creator-owned books... people often see the company primarily in light of our licensed books, and Lord knows we do publish a lot of them, but the roots of this company are with creator-owned books and Maverick was an attempt to underline that aspect.

The aim of the Maverick line was to "push the medium a little bit," although Schutz recognized that such titles are often a hard sell. To help address this, the Maverick Annual anthologies (published from 2000 as Dark Horse Maverick and later under such subtitles as Happy Endings and AutobioGraphix) put newer creators (Farel Dalrymple, Gilbert Austin, Jason Hall, Matt Kindt) alongside established names such as Frank Miller and Sam Kieth.

=== Titles ===
The first title published was Frank Miller's Sin City: Hell and Back—Miller also having suggested the "Maverick" name—and was edited by Schutz. The first year's output saw Maverick "consolidate... [Dark Horse's] creator-owned, creator-produced titles under one roof—such diverse titles as Mike Mignola's Hellboy, Stan Sakai's Usagi Yojimbo, Paul Chadwick's The World Below, Matt Wagner's Grendel, and Sergio Aragonés' (and Mark Evanier's) Groo, to mention just a few," bringing in new titles such as Rich Tommaso's The Horror of Collier County and providing a home for such projects as P. Craig Russell's adaptation of Der Ring des Nibelungen.

The eclectic titles had one thing in common according to Schutz: "It has a lot to do with the particular project being a labor of love for the individual creator," despite the logical oddity of "attempting to unite the unique visions of each individual creator," which she termed "a paradoxical enterprise at best." The titles featured design work by Cary Grazzini, and each featured an individual variation of the distinctive Dark Horse "horse head", an idea of Mike Richardson's to "truly reflect... the spirit of independence that is Dark Horse Maverick."

=== Editorial staff ===
Although Schutz initiated the line, she did not edit all titles (indeed, some titles such as Hellboy simply changed imprint without any changes in the editorial team working on them), instead she "over[saw] the whole line," as she "couldn't possibly handle editing every single book published under the imprint." Ultimate control over which titles best fit the imprint, however, did lay with Schutz and Dark Horse owner-publisher Mike Richardson, with input from others including Phil Amara (who "signed up Eric Drooker to do a reprinting of his seminal graphic novel Flood," and worked with Scott Allie on Scatterbrain).

== Year two ==
During its second year, Schutz highlighted Maverick's "trades program" as standing out, both for collecting previously published materials, including Neil Gaiman and Alice Cooper's The Last Temptation (initially released in 1994 by Marvel Music), and debuting new work. New works included titles by entirely new creators as well as such legendary individuals as Will Eisner. Somewhat ahead of its time, the imprint would contend with the "financial obstacles" that go hand-in-hand, said Schutz in 2001, with the then-declining numbers of people reading comics, but she maintained that:

"The future of comics resides in the kinds of projects that are going to appeal to a more adult reader. For instance, of the kinds of projects that have gotten a lot of play in the past year, two come immediately to mind, and both were published — at least originally — by Fantagraphics. One is my pal Joe Sacco's Safe Area Gorazde, and the other is Chris Ware's Jimmy Corrigan collection. Both of those books have gotten a lot of play in the 'mainstream' press; they've been written up in The New York Times for instance... It's that kind of more adult material that will help us break out of the sort of superhero-bound, direct-sales specialty market. And I strongly feel that if comics have any future whatsoever, that's what we have to pursue, and in large part, that's what I'm hoping to do with the Maverick imprint."

=== Delays ===
Format changes delayed the release of Neil Gaiman and John Bolton's Harlequin Valentine, which Schutz had originally "planned to [publish] as a 32-page comic book with no ads," but, after seeing the artwork, decided that she wanted:

"...to make it a perennial publication — always available and always on the stand. How can I do that in our current marketplace? There's only one answer — I turned it into a book. It will now be a 40-page hardcover book, featuring a 30-page comic-book story and an eight-page backup text piece written by Neil with some single illustrations by John. That way, we can present it to both the direct-sales specialty market and the bookstore market and, again, keep it perennially available. Because it's so beautiful, it demands that kind of treatment."

=== Anthologies ===
The Maverick Annual anthologies not only featured established and new names, but managed to entice work from semi-retired individuals such as Will Eisner, J.R. Williams, and Denis Kitchen. Kitchen is perhaps better known as a publisher, but as Schutz notes, she is "old enough to remember a time when Denis was not merely a publisher but was also an artist and was one of the early crew of underground cartoonists. And he was a fabulous cartoonist, but simply has been pursuing other interests." Kitchen agreed, during a CBDLF cruise in 2000, to contribute a story to Dark Horse Maverick 2001 called "My Five Minutes With God". Schutz also wanted to spotlight then-lesser known French individuals Philippe Dupuy and Charles Berberian, beyond their normal Drawn & Quarterly audience.
