= Art Thibert =

American comic book artist

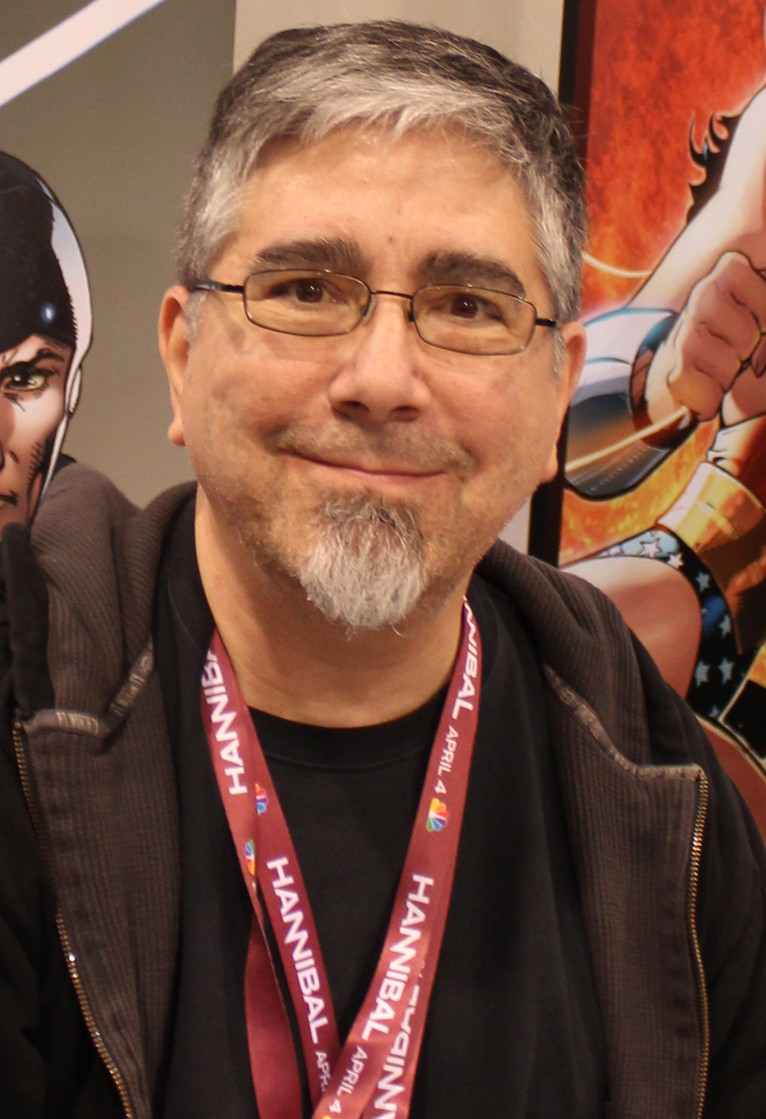
- Thibert at WonderCon 2013
- Born: Arthur Thibert
- Areas: Writer, Penciller, Inker
- Notable works: X-Men titles, Black and White, Ultimate Spider-Man, Chrono Mechanics
- Awards: Wizard Fan Award (2001, 2002); Inkwell Award for Props Award (2011)

Arthur Thibert (/tiːˈbɛər/) is an American comic book artist, primarily known as a freelance inker, although he has a substantial résumé as a penciler and has even written some comics. Thibert is best known for his work as an inker for Marvel Comics on their various X-Men titles during the 1990s.

== Freelance inker ==
Thibert broke into comics in 1986, as an inker for WaRP Graphics' Myth Adventures. He truly latched on to the industry in 1989, becoming regular inker (over Dan Jurgens' pencils) for DC's The Adventures of Superman until 1991.

From 1991 to 2004 (with a break from 1993 to 1995), Thibert inked almost exclusively for Marvel, many of those years spent on their X-Men titles. He inked X-Factor for much of 1991, and was the regular inker of X-Men vol. 2 in 1992.

From 1993 to 1995, Thibert associated himself with the "upstart" Image Comics, where he primarily inked covers, for such titles as Spawn, Supreme, Team Youngblood, and Brigade.

Returning to Marvel, Thibert inked Carlos Pacheco on X-Men vol. 2 from 1996 to 1998. He also returned to X-Factor in 1997. In addition, during the 1990s Thibert inked over twenty issues of The Uncanny X-Men. From 1999 to 2000, Thibert inked virtually the entire run of Bishop: The Last X-Man (over penciller Georges Jeanty). He was the regular inker of Ultimate X-Men in 2001 (over Adam Kubert), and again from 2003 to 2004 (over David Finch).

Other regular inking duties Thibert performed during this period included Fantastic Four vol. 3 (over Salvador Larroca) from 1998 to 2000; and Ultimate Spider-Man (over Mark Bagley's pencils) from 2000 to 2004.

In 2005, Thibert moved back to DC, where he inked the Outsiders from 2005 to 2007, mostly over Matthew Clark's pencils. During this period he also penciled and inked covers for The Flash. In 2007, Thibert was the regular inker of The Flash: The Fastest Man Alive; and in 2008 he returned to inking Mark Bagley on DC's Trinity title.

== Creator-owned projects ==
In 1994, Image also published three issues of Thibert's own title Black and White.

In 2004, Image published one issue of Thibert's creator-owned series Chrono Mechanics (co-written with Rich Birdsall), a light-hearted adventure series about four very different individuals (human and otherwise) that were brought together to "fix" time. In 2006, Alias Enterprises published four more issues of the title.

Both titles would later be revived by Thibert through crowdfunding campaigns on Indiegogo in 2018 and 2019.

== Hack Shack Studios ==
Thibert owns and operates Art Thibert's Hack Shack Studios, a California-based art and design studio serving the "television, advertising, comic book, and movie industries. Notable clients include Marvel Comics, DC Comics, MGM, TV Guide, and MTV." Projects in the works from Hack Shack include Rock 'N' Roll Botz, Kid Everything, and The Nightmare Files.

== Awards ==
Thibert has twice won the Wizard Fan Award for Favorite Inker, in 2001 and 2002. In addition, he was nominated for a 1992 Eisner Award for Best Inker (for his work on The Uncanny X-Men). In 2011 Thibert was awarded the Props Award for inker deserving more recognition by the Inkwell Awards.

== Selected works ==
Thibert's inks over Matthew Clark's pencils, from Outsiders vol. 3, #28 (November 2005)

As inker, unless otherwise noted

- The Adventures of Superman (DC, 1989–1991)
- X-Factor (Marvel, 1991, 1997)
- Superman: The Wedding Album (DC, 1996)
- X-Men vol. 2 (Marvel, 1992, 1996–1998)
- Fantastic Four vol. 3 (1998–2000)
- Bishop: The Last X-Man (Marvel, 1999–2000)
- Ultimate Spider-Man (Marvel, 2000–2004)
- Ultimate X-Men (Marvel, 2001, 2003–2004)
- Chrono Mechanics (Image, 2004; Alias Enterprises, 2006) — writer/artist
- Outsiders (DC, 2005–2007)
- The Flash: The Fastest Man Alive (DC, 2007)
- Trinity (DC, 2008)
