= Jeromy Cox =

American colorist

- Born: October 23, 1970 (age 55)

Jeromy Cox (born October 23, 1970) is an American colorist. He has worked on several notable titles including Detective Comics, Spider-Man, Promethea, Mage, Avengers Academy, DMZ, and Grendel.

== Biography ==
His coloring career began at WildStorm, and went on to include work for all major comic book companies, including Marvel, DC Comics, Dark Horse Comics, and IDW Publishing in addition to coloring several covers for Heavy Metal and work on numerous independent titles.

Cox is also a penciller, inker, and writer of his own comics, including Zombie Love and Vampyrates.

In March 2014, a demonstration DVD of Cox's coloring techniques was released by PhotoshopCAFE.
