= Bilquis Evely =

Brazilian comic artist

- Born: July 20, 1990 (age 36); Barueri, Greater São Paulo
- Style: Comic book artist
- Awards: Eisner Award for Best Penciller/Inker

Bilquis Evely (born July 20, 1990) is a Brazilian comic book artist.

== Biography ==
Bilquis Evely was born in 1990 in the city of Barueri, in the Greater São Paulo. She started on comics in 2009, drawing Luluzinha Teen e sua Turma, a Brazilian teenage-oriented version of Little Lulu. In 2012 she debuted on the American market, drawing Doc Savage and Shaft for Dynamite Entertainment.

In 2015 she was invited by DC Comics to draw Supergirl for Bombshells. Other titles she worked for were Sugar and Spike, Wonder Woman (2016) and The Dreaming (2018-2020; with Si Spurrier).

In 2021, Evely, together with Tom King (writer) and Mat Lopes (colorist), worked on the miniseries Supergirl: Woman of Tomorrow. The series was nominated for the 2022 Eisner Award in the Limited Series category and was adapted into a 2026 film.

In 2024, she drew her first authorial series, Helen of Wyndhorn (written by King), for Dark Horse Comics. For this she won the 2025 Eisner Award for Best Penciller/Inker.

== Honors ==
- 2020 - Rudolph Dirks Award (Germany) for Best Comics Artist - South and Central America, for Sandman Universe: The Dreaming.
- 2022 - Troféu HQ Mix - Brazilian Artist of International Relevance.
- 2025 - Eisner Award for Best Penciller/Inker, for Helen of Wyndhorn.
  - Ringo Award for Best Cover Artist, for Helen of Wyndhorn.

In 2025, Evely would be a recipient of the Inkpot Award at the annual San Diego Comic Con.
