= Batman/Superman/Wonder Woman: Trinity =

Comic book limited series

- Cover of Trinity HC. Art by Matt Wagner.

Publication information
- Publisher: DC Comics
- Schedule: Monthly
- Format: Limited series
- Publication date: June 2003 to November 2003
- No. of issues: 3
- Main character(s): Superman; Batman; Wonder Woman; Ra's al Ghul; Bizarro; Artemis of Bana-Mighdall

Creative team
- Written by: Matt Wagner
- Artist: Matt Wagner

Batman/Superman/Wonder Woman: Trinity is a three-issue comic book limited series published by the publishing company DC Comics in 2003. Written and drawn by Matt Wagner, the series focused on the first meeting and alliance between DC's Trinity: Batman, Superman, and Wonder Woman, regarded as DC's most popular characters. The story takes place before the formation of the Justice League. The series was collected as a hardback in 2004 and eventually a softcover trade paperback by DC Comics in 2005.

== Overview ==
The story establishes the first meeting between The World's Finest Trinity: Superman, Batman and Wonder Woman. When Batman's greatest nemesis, Ra's al Ghul, recruits Bizarro and the Amazon warrior Artemis to aid him in his plan to create global chaos, the Dark Knight Detective suddenly finds himself working with the Man of Steel and the Amazon Princess. Looking to thwart the madman's plot to simultaneously destroy all satellite communications as well as all of the world's oil reserves, Earth's greatest heroes reluctantly band together. But if Batman, Superman and Wonder Woman are to have any hope of stopping Ra's nuclear missile assault, they will first need to overcome their own biases and reconcile their differing philosophies.

== Plot ==
=== Issue 1 ===
In keeping up his secret identity, Clark Kent misses the train to take him to work, something he intentionally does three times a week. A gunshot is heard from that train and Clark appears as Superman and finds the victim: the train's driver. As the train speeds up uncontrollably, Superman tries to grab the side of the train but it already plummets off the curve toward the ground. But Superman manages to catch it before it hits the ground. Superman tracks the trajectory of the bullet that killed the driver, but finds nothing. In the distance, shadowy figures track his movements, and later that night, those figures break into S.T.A.R. Labs. They make sure Superman is not around to stop them, but a shadowy figure appears and stops them anyway. The media believes Superman was the one who stopped the thieves, but speculation abounds as to why he decided to leave them hogtied. In Antarctica, other shadowy figures track down and dig out a creature created by Lex Luthor: Bizarro. Clark receives a tip from an old friend, and he meets him in his limousine. Bruce was the one who captured the S.T.A.R. Labs thieves, as he explains that he has been on the trail of an exclusive cartel that can obtain any type of weapon calling themselves "the Purge". The thieves were after kryptonite, and determining that there wouldn't be enough time til the next job for him to do so, Bruce requests Superman's help in the decryption of a LexCorp disc, both men concurrently surmising that the thieves will steal next from Lexcorp.

An Amazon woman, who calls herself "Diana", passes her "audition" by fighting several shadowy figures. A man from the shadows offers her a position with The Purge. Clark breaks the code on the disk and discovers that The Purge was after something called "Project Replica". He knows what it means, and goes to one of the locations, only to find it missing. Covered in heavy, thick chains, Bizarro sits as the shadowy man enters: Ra's al Ghul. Calling Bizarro his "friend", he talks him into joining the Purge and adds that no one will ever harm him again. He is released, and given a medallion that says "Bizarro #1". In the Batcave, Batman informs Superman that the man behind The Purge is Ra's al Ghul, an eco-terrorist. Batman once had connections inside Ra's al Ghul's network, but they disappeared. He knows whatever he is doing, it is big. Bizarro steals a nuclear sub, only to be attacked. He shakes the sub and kills all the soldiers, with one of the missiles launched and detonated near Themyscira. Above the Daily Planet, Superman is greeted by Princess Diana aka Wonder Woman. She has come to talk about the missile that fell, for which the Amazons believe Superman responsible. When it is eventually revealed to be the work of Bizarro, Diana voices regret over the Amazons' initial suspicions of Superman. Both decide to take down the sub, and Superman and Wonder Woman take a ride in her invisible jet.

Tracking the sub down at the Sahara desert, they find a camp where they investigate an underground facility. Soon, the two heroes are attacked, but Diana is able to deflect the bullets. The commander orders Unit A to fall back and Unit B to advance. Realizing Unit B are suicide bombers, Superman can do nothing but shield Diana as the bombers explode. The dust settles, and after Superman takes care of the nerve gas, they make their way to the commander who has locked himself in a vault. Inside, the commander activates a bomb and kills himself just as Superman and Diana burst in. With no time left, Superman gets Diana out as he spins at incredible speed to get the bomb underground as it explodes. As she leaves, Diana sees a knot on a crate that is an Amazonian Bridle Knot. Diana tries to find Superman as his hand breaks through the surface. When Diana mentions the crate addressed to Gotham City, Superman knows whom to ask for help.

=== Issue 2 ===
"Diana" and members of The Purge meet with a street gang in Gotham. Inspecting the "merchandise", Batman takes down the Purge, and soon does the same with the gang. When he goes after "Diana", Batman is able to fend off most, but not all, of her attacks. Finally, "Diana" knocks him out and escapes. Recovered, Batman uses one of the Purge members to get answers. Not able to get anything, a golden lasso wraps around the man and he starts spilling his guts. Diana does not approve of Batman's aggressive methods, but he is not seeking approval. Superman tries to play peacemaker while he introduces one to another, and why they are here. After bringing him up to speed, Batman gives the two heroes a psychological sketch of Ra's and wants to question the Purge member further, using Wonder Woman's lasso. She agrees, if he does not brutalize the suspect. After getting the man's name, rank and serial number, the three learn the missile is in Gotham, but he does not know the location. When they are finished, Batman breaks the man's jaw.

Batman and Wonder Woman get at each other's throats over Batman's brutality toward the man they question. Diana is taken aback, though, when Batman reveals the "Diana" he met was wearing an eagle crest like Diana's. Batman departs, leaving Wonder Woman to question how Superman could consider such a man a friend. Before she leaves, she hands him one of her ear rings that is also a transmitter. Below Gotham, Ra's enters his Lazarus Pit, where "Diana" learns he is much older. Ra's learns from her that she is from Themyscira, and her name is Artemis of Bana-Mighdall. In the Batcave, Batman explains to Superman that there are a total of half a dozen missiles, meaning there are four left. He also informs Superman that in twenty-four hours, 95% of the world's communication satellites will pass within five cubic miles of each other, creating a unique formation that will not occur again for centuries, and something that no one, except Ra's, is aware of. If Ra's detonates a missile in the center, the world will be thrown into a communications blackout. As Superman goes out to take care of the missile in Bulgaria, Batman reveals he knows something he did not tell Superman: the location of Ra's al Ghul.

In her jet, Wonder Woman sits impatiently until she picks off a signal: Bizarro. Following him to Ra's' lair, she learns that the missile is still prepped and ready, so she reveals herself. As she gets to Ra's, Bizarro appears and gets the upper hand, even breaking Diana's lasso, before completely beating her. Superman reaches the silo in Bulgaria and plans to stop the missile as it launches. Grabbing the warhead, he throws it into deep space as it explodes. Wonder Woman awakens in the same chains that held Bizarro with Ra's next to her. Exchanging words, Ra's reveals that one of the missiles will destroy Gotham, while the others will give something bigger for Superman to worry about: all part of his plan to save Earth from man. Seeing a group of guards out cold, Artemis is attacked by Batman, and finally gets the upper hand against her. Just as Bizarro is about to kill Diana, Batman appears and hurts Bizarro with an explosive that hurts his eyes. Blinded, he files off as Batman fights Ra's and beats him, until Ubu surprises Batman in order for Ra's to escape. Freeing Diana, Batman and Wonder Woman make their way deep into the complex until Diana gets weakened from the fumes of the Lazarus Pit. Batman goes to work on the missile as one of Ra's followers, Sybil, attacks him. Diana, still weak, fights her but is stabbed. Batman cries for the Amazon, just as Sybil falls to her death and Batman stops the missile. Diana enters the Pit just as Superman arrives. When she emerges, the fact that the Pit causes anyone to go insane at first leads Diana to lash out against Superman and Batman just as she leaves.

=== Issue 3 ===
Worried about her, Superman and Batman travel to Themyscira to see how Diana is doing. Breaking off the harness and gliding down, Batman finds Diana after taking her bath. Overcome by her beauty he rushes forward and kisses her, but Diana, surprised, decks the Dark Knight. Suddenly, Amazonian soldiers surround Batman, but Superman descends before a fight can break out. Diana informs them that these men are here to speak to her and they need to do so in private. On the atoll, Diana apologizes for her hasty departure from Gotham and assumes that the Purge is still active. Batman is quick to realize that Ra's will have to change his plans. Superman will go find Bizarro and Diana will try to find anything she can. In the Gobi, Artemis learns that Ra's' new plan is to find a new remote location as their headquarters: Themyscira. Diana asks her mother, Hippolyta, about the rogue Amazon and she reveals the existence of a group of Amazons known as the Bana-Mighdall. Superman figures out where Bizarro is when he realizes Batman's tracking device is being interfered with by extreme cold. Wonder Woman meets Batman, as Bruce Wayne, indicating that she knew who he really was. With him she figures that with a rogue Amazon as his ally, Themyscira would be the perfect target as Ra's new location.

At Ra's headquarters, Superman comes out of nowhere and fights Bizarro and buries Bizarro into a mountain side. Ra's meets with Superman and tells him of two airplanes that are about to be destroyed in Metropolis. Not wanting to believe him, Superman leaves to make sure things are well in his city. Ra's and Bizarro resume prepping their forces to invade Themyscira. Superman arrives in Metropolis in time to see two airplanes preparing to crash into the Lexcorp building. He grabs one plane and manages to maneuver it into the second one and the two planes crash into the lake. Superman takes off once more. Ra's forces reach Themyscira, and the Amazons prepare for battle. A sonic device knocks Bizarro out as Wonder Woman and Batman descend onto the scene. As Batman battles Bizarro, and Wonder Woman and Ra's duel, Artemis leads the attack against Themyscira. However, after seeing the dying Amazons, she has a change of heart, so she fights against Ra's forces by shooting down some of the helicopters. Soon, Superman comes in and disables all the rest of the helicopters and finds Artemis. Wonder Woman finally defeats Ra's and helps Batman against Bizarro until Superman comes in, burns Bizarro's hand off, and punches him into a volcano. The battle ends when the three disable all the remaining weapons and send all to the bottom of the water.

Returning to their homes, Superman cannot believe how they almost had a disaster, as Wonder Woman cannot find the rogue Amazon and Batman knows Ra's Al Ghul will return as it has happened before. All of them agree that without each of them meeting the others, it would have happened differently. Each of them consider the others friends. In an epilogue, Ra's al Ghul's body is found by his daughter, Talia al Ghul. Artemis begins her journey home after spending a few months on the other side of Themyscira. Below the ocean, the severed hand of Bizarro glows an eerie red, becoming red kryptonite.

== Reception ==
Critics and fans applauded the series, during and following its original release in comic book format, and onto collection format. Reviewers felt that the change in storytelling by having the characterization more of the star of the mini-series, than the pacing, plotting or action, was a welcome change. This was due to, what reviewers felt, that all three characters had "shallow portrayals" in their monthly titles at the time. Some reviewers found some drawbacks, such as the concept getting a little lost along the way. As well as the fact that some felt that there was no feeling, nor challenge, that could have even suggested that the Big Three might have been unable to prevail in the adventure from this mini-series.

== Publications ==
=== DC versions ===
- Batman/Superman/Wonder Woman: Trinity: Includes Batman/Superman/Wonder Woman: Trinity #1-3.

- hardcover (ISBN 1-4012-0309-4/978-1-4012-0309-2, 2004-01-01)
- softcover (ISBN 1-4012-0187-3/978-1-4012-0187-6, 2005-06-29)
- hardcover deluxe edition (ISBN 1-4012-5690-2/978-1-4012-5690-6, 2016-01-13)
- softcover new edition (ISBN, 2017-07-26)

=== ECC Cómics versions ===
- Batman/Superman/Wonder Woman: Trinidad (ISBN 978-84-16255-32-0, 2014-11-??): Includes Batman/Superman/Wonder Woman: Trinity #1-3 in Spanish.
- Trinidad (ISBN 978-84-16796-11-3, 2017-03-??): Includes Batman/Superman/Wonder Woman: Trinity #1-3, World's Finest #71 (1954) in Spanish.
