= The Duckberg Times =

The Duckberg Times was a free, alternative newspaper published in Washington, D.C., from January 1985 through 1990.

A typical issue featured between 16 and 32 tabloid size pages, although some issues were printed in broadsheet format shortly before its demise. The typical print run was 10,000 copies per issue.

The newspaper evolved from featuring all-original cartoons and comics to covering the local alternative music scene and reprinting articles and other content that originally had appeared in small press publications from around the United States.

One of the founding editors of The Duckberg Times was John K. Snyder III, who would later pursue a successful career as a comic book and graphic novel illustrator.

Originally a monthly publication, The Duckberg Times published every other week during its third year, then became a bi-monthly / quarterly / erratically released newspaper until it ceased publication with issue number 50.

A magazine-sized "Best of Duckberg" publication collected 48 pages of comics and art drawn from the pages of the newspaper.

The Duckberg Times was part of The Chronicle Newspaper Group, which included The King Street Chronicle, The Washington Art Reporter, The Antiques Chronicle, and The Alexandria Visitor's Guide.
