= Diana Schutz =

Canadian-born comic book editor (born 1955)

- Diana Schutz at Michigan State University in 2018
- Born: February 1, 1955 (age 71) Canada
- Areas: Writer, Editor
- Awards: Eisner Award for Best Anthology (1999, 2005); Harvey Award for Best Anthology (2005); Haxtur Award (2006) (with Tim Sale); Friends of Lulu Award for Women of Distinction (2006)

Diana Schutz (born February 1, 1955) is a Canadian-born comic book editor, serving as editor in chief of Comico during its peak years, followed by a 25-year tenure at Dark Horse Comics. Some of the best-known works she has edited are Frank Miller's Sin City and 300, Matt Wagner's Grendel, Stan Sakai's Usagi Yojimbo, and Paul Chadwick's Concrete. She was known to her letter-column readers as "Auntie Dydie". She was an adjunct instructor of comics history and criticism at Portland Community College.

== Early life ==
Diana Schutz was born on February 1, 1955, in Canada. She read comics as a child. By her early teens, she began drifting towards romance titles, and then away from comics altogether until college, where she studied philosophy and creative writing. Finding comics, including Steve Gerber's Howard the Duck a welcome diversion from—if ultimately not a polar opposite to—"Plato, Bertrand Russell and Immanuel Kant," she found herself pulled back into the world of comics. Frequenting the comic shop called "The ComicShop" (owned by Ken Witcher and Ron Norton) in Vancouver, British Columbia, she ultimately dropped out of graduate philosophy (with an undergraduate degree in creative writing) to move (in 1978) from being one of the ComicShop's few female customers to being one of its few "counter people," where she says she found herself "learn[ing] social skills I never learned in the ivory tower of academia."

Witcher, Norton, and The ComicShop swiftly proved able sources for Schutz to discover comics, including "Barry Windsor-Smith's Conan; Jim Starlin's Captain Marvel; Craig Russell's Killraven; and Dave Sim's Cerebus, of which she was "one of the first 2,000 readers to actually buy issue 1."

== Career ==
Schutz worked in comics stores for six years, moving from Vancouver to California and from The ComicShop to Comics and Comix in 1981. By 1982, she was making the move from retail towards publishing by means of a "bimonthly, 32-page newsletter that [she] put together for Comics & Comix entitled The Telegraph Wire which was modeled on The Comics Journal (each issue containing an interview, reviews, news and adverts), and its production swiftly became her role at C&C.

=== Networking and early roles ===
Working on The Telegraph Wire "put me in touch with creators whom I would interview [and] publishers from whom I would solicit advertising to help underwrite the cost of this "newsletter" that we would give out for free at each of the seven Comics & Comix stores." These contacts were added to by her attendance at an increasing numbers of conventions, including the Creation Conventions and the San Diego convention:

Creation, at that time, used to run a comic book show virtually every weekend in some part of the country. It was then that I met my future ... husband, Bob Schreck, who was working for Creation in those days.

In addition to meeting and mingling with publishers, distributors, promotion teams and all manner of creators, Schutz started freelance work for "various other fan publications", including Comics Buyer's Guide, The Comics Journal, Amazing Heroes and Comics Scene, from which she graduated to a very brief—four-day—job with Marvel Comics as an assistant editor.

Recommended by friend Chris Claremont, Schutz was to be (at age 29) Ann Nocenti's assistant editor on the X-Men, but found herself entering her new job with "unrealistic expectations"; ultimately handing in her notice after a mere four days. Several months later (in 1985), she (and Bob Schreck) began work at Comico, which "with its opportunities for creator ownership, and the fact that it was much smaller and more personable, was much more [her] style". Schutz's first comic book editing credit was Robotech: The Macross Saga #3. Having picked up in her brief tenure at Marvel some knowledge "from Virginia Romita how to create and enforce production schedules", Schutz took over as Comico's primary editor. (Schreck oversaw "all the marketing and publishing type aspects".)

=== Dave Sim and Cerebus ===
Having been one of the small core of readers who bought the first issue of Dave Sim's Cerebus, Schutz got to know the man himself, and began working for him as a proofreader, first unofficially, and then officially from the "middle of '94" until early 2001. She explains that she "never proofed the book itself," "[j]ust the text, the typeset text" feeling that her respect for his abilities outweighed any potential "qualms" about the book's often-contentious content.

Schutz's stated stance (which has largely held sway throughout her entire editorial career) is that her role is not to interfere with an artist's story, merely to make sure that their work is "as grammatically clear as it could be." This she did for Sim for several years, balking only when Sim sent her a "boxing challenge to proofread" which she felt was a personal attack on a friend (and one introduced to her by Sim himself). Schutz promptly resigned in January 2001, and Sim even published her resignation letter in Cerebus #265. This issue also included a "20-page anti-female diatribe," and Schutz remains mildly aggravated over this juxtaposition, since she thinks some readers might equate the two—she did not, and found herself having to explain that she had no problem proofreading "an argument, no matter how faulty, in which Dave believes," no matter her personal views, and that she had resigned over the boxing challenge itself from the previous issue, #264. Indeed, even while Schutz was performing proofreading duties, she did so via fax, and had very little—if any—personal contact with Sim himself.

=== Dark Horse ===
By 1990, Schutz began work for Dark Horse Comics, rising (by 2007) to the position of Executive Editor, having variously held the roles of Senior Editor, Managing Editor, and Editor-in-Chief. In December 2001, she was the fifth-most-senior staff member in terms of length-of-employment (after, respectively, Mike Richardson, Randy Stradley, Neil Hankerson and Cary Grazzini), but stated that she had originally relinquished the job of Editor-in-Chief in December 1995, after almost two years, "because what it did is it put me in meetings all the damn time, writing memos and holding people's hands and I wasn't able to make good comics anymore".

Concurrent with her move to Oregon, Schutz returned to graduate studies, and in 1994 she received a Master of Arts degree in Communication Studies from the University of Portland, writing her M.A. thesis on female cartoonists Julie Doucet, Roberta Gregory, and Aline Kominsky-Crumb.

==== Frank Miller ====
With Bob Schreck's departure from Dark Horse (first to Oni Press and then to DC), Frank Miller found himself without an editor, and called Schutz – the two are friends – in the hopes that she would agree to edit his subsequent work. Initially reluctant, thinking that the professional relationship could jeopardize their friendship, she ultimately agreed to a "trial run of six months", which extended into an editor-writer relationship of several years.

==== Maverick ====
In July 1999, Schutz instigated the Maverick imprint at Dark Horse Comics, which was designed as an umbrella title for a number of creator-owned titles, including some already published by Dark Horse and some new to the publisher. The 'Maverick' name was suggested by Frank Miller and was designed "to provide a kind of identity or specific line for those sorts of individual creator visions." The aim of the "Maverick" line was to "push the medium a little bit," although Schutz recognized that such titles are often a hard sell. To help address this, the Maverick Annual anthologies (published from 2000 as Dark Horse Maverick and later under such subtitles as Happy Endings and AutobioGraphix) placed newer creators (Farel Dalrymple, Gilbert Austin, Jason Hall, Matt Kindt) alongside the more established names of Frank Miller and Sam Kieth.

Debuting with the Schutz-edited Sin City: Hell and Back by Miller, the first year consolidated "[Dark Horse's] creator-owned, creator-produced titles under one roof, including such diverse titles as Mike Mignola's Hellboy, Stan Sakai's Usagi Yojimbo, Paul Chadwick's The World Below, Matt Wagner's Grendel, and Sergio Aragonés's Groo. The line was also used for "new titles such as Rich Tommaso's The Horror of Collier County and providing a home for such projects as P. Craig Russell's adaptation of The Ring of the Nibelung.

The eclectic titles had one thing in common, according to Schutz—"it has a lot to do with the particular project being a labor of love for the individual creator," despite the logical oddity of "attempting to unite the unique visions of each individual creator," which she termed "a paradoxical enterprise at best." The titles featured design work by Cary Grazzini, and each featured an individual variation of the distinctive Dark Horse "horse head," an idea of Mike Richardson's to "truly reflect... the spirit of independence that is Dark Horse Maverick."

During its second year, Schutz highlighted Maverick's "trades program" as standing out, both for collecting previously published materials, including Neil Gaiman and Alice Cooper's The Last Temptation (initially released in 1994 by Marvel Music), and debuting new work, including titles by such legendary individuals as Will Eisner. Somewhat ahead of its time, the imprint would contend with the "financial obstacles" that go hand-in-hand, said Schutz in 2001, with the then-declining numbers of people reading comics, but she maintained that:

...the future of comics resides in the kinds of projects that are going to appeal to a more adult reader.

Schutz announced her retirement from Dark Horse in March 2015.

== In comics ==
A character named Diana Schutz makes a cameo appearance in issue #23 of Brian Michael Bendis and Mike Oeming's comics series Powers (collected in the fifth trade paperback, Powers: Anarchy), as the owner of an eatery called Dark Horse Coffee. Her character discusses the problematic nature of vigilante superheroes who exist above the normal system of law, and why non-powered individuals might feel betrayed by, wary, or resentful of them.

== Bibliography ==
=== As writer ===
- Grendel: Devil Child
- "Tuesday Night at the Jazz Club" in Dark Horse Presents #97
  - reprinted with minor corrections in AutobioGraphix (2003)
- "Knox" (adaptation) in Harlan Ellison's Dream Corridor (1995)
- Contributed to FantaCo's Chronicles Series #4: "The Avengers Chronicles" (Fantaco/Tundra Jun 1982)
- Grendel: Devil Child #1–2 (art by Tim Sale) (1999)
- "Season's Greeting" in Robotech The Macross Saga #35 (1984)
- "Young Love" in Solo #1 (Tim Sale) (2004)
- Usagi Yojimbo #100 (2007)
- "Jeff Macey's Girls" in Sexy Chix (2006)
- "Introduction" to Daredevil Visionaries: Frank Miller, Volume 2 (Marvel, Apr 2000)
- "Foreword" to Wonder Woman Archives, Volume 2 (DC, Nov 2000)
- "Introduction" to Supergirl Archives, Volume 1 (DC, Nov 2001)
- "Introduction" to Truth Serum (City Cyclops, 2005)
- 'Resignation Letter' in Cerebus #265

=== As editor at Comico ===
- Mage: The Hero Discovered #6–15 (Comico, 1985 – Dec 1986)
- Next Man #1–5 (Mar–Oct 1985)
- Robotech The Macross Saga #3, 5–19, 29–36 (May 1985 – Feb 1989)
- Robotech Masters #1–15 (July 1985 – April 1987)
- Robotech The New Generation #1–6, 11–16 (July 1985 – June 1987)
- Elementals Special #1–2 (Mar 1986, Jan 1989)
- Justice Machine featuring the Elementals #1–4 (May–Aug 1986)
- Jonny Quest #1–31 (Jun 1986 – Dec 1988)
- Grendel #1–40 (Oct 1986 – Jan 1990)
- Elementals #11, 17–29 (Dec 1986 – Sep 1988)
- Justice Machine #1–11 (Jan–Nov 1987)
- Star Blazers #1–4 (Apr–Jul 1987)
- Gumby's Summer Fun Special #1 (Jul 1987)
- The World of Ginger Fox OGN (1987)
- Grendel: Devil's Vagary one-shot (Oct 1987)
- Night and the Enemy TPB (Nov 1987)
- Space Ghost #1 (Dec 1987)
- Robotech Special #1 (May 1988)
- The Jam Color Special #1 (May 1988)
- The Rocketeer Adventure Magazine #1–2 (Jul 1988, 1989)
- Ginger Fox #1–4 (Sep–Dec 1988)
- Comico Christmas Special #1 (Dec 1988)
- Ribit! #1–4 (Jan–Apr 1989)
- The Amazon #1–3 (Mar–May 1989)
- The Trouble with Girls #2 (Mar 1989) #2
- Trekker Color Special #1 (Jul 1989)
- Silverback #1–3 (Oct–Dec 1989)

=== As editor at Dark Horse ===
==== Grendel ====
- Grendel: War Child #1–10 (Aug 1992 – Apr 1993)
- The History Of Grendel one-shot (1993)
- Batman/Grendel: Devil's Riddle #1 (Apr 1993)
- Batman/Grendel: Devil's Masque #2 (May 1993)
- Grendel: Devil By The Deed one-shot (Jul 1993)
- Grendel Tales: Four Devils, One Hell #1–6 (Aug 1993 – Jan 1994)
- Grendel Tales: The Devil's Hammer #1–3 (Feb–Apr 1994)
- Grendel Tales: The Devil in Our Midst #1–5 (May–Sep 1994)
- Grendel Tales: Devils and Deaths #1–2 (Sep–Nov 1994)
- Grendel Tales: Homecoming #1–3 (Dec 1994 – Feb 1995)
- Grendel Tales: Devil's Choices #1–4 (Mar–Jun 1995)
- Grendel Classics #1–2 (Jul–Aug 1995)
- Grendel Cycle #1 (Oct 1995)
- Grendel Tales: The Devil May Care #1 (Dec 1995 – May 1986)
- Batman/Grendel: Devil's Bones #1 (Jun 1996)
- Batman/Grendel: Devil's Dance #2 (Jun 1996)
- Grendel Tales: The Devil's Apprentice #1–3 (Sep–Nov 1997)
- Grendel: Black, White & Red #1–4 (Nov 1998 – Feb 1999)
- Grendel: Devil Child (with Matt Wagner; also writer) #1–2 (Jun–Aug 1999)
- Grendel: Devil's Legacy #1–12 (Mar 2000 – Feb 2001)
- Grendel: The Devil Inside #1–3 (Sep–Nov 2001)
- Grendel: Red, White, & Black #1–4 (Sep–Dec 2002)
- Grendel: God and the Devil #0–10 (Jan–Dec 2003)
- Grendel: Devil's Reign #1–7 (May–Dec 2004)
- Grendel: Behold the Devil #0–8 (Jul 2007 – Jun 2008)

==== American Splendor ====
- American Splendor #17 (Jul 1993)
- American Splendor: Windfall #1–2 (Sep–Oct 1995)
- American Splendor: Comic-Con Comics #1 (Aug 1996)
- American Splendor: On the Job #1 (May 1997)
- American Splendor: Music Comics #1 (Nov 1997)
- American Splendor: Odds & Ends #1 (Dec 1997)
- American Splendor: TransAtlantic Comics #1 (Jul 1998)
- American Splendor: Terminal #1 (Sep 1999)
- American Splendor: Bedtime Stories #1 (Jun 2000)
- American Splendor: Portrait of the Author in His Declining Years #1 (Apr 2001)
- American Splendor: Unsung Hero #1–3 (Aug–Oct 2002)

==== Maverick ====
- Sin City: Hell and Back #1–9 (Jul 1999 – Apr 2000) - launch title
- The Horror of Collier County #1–5 (Oct 1999 – Feb 2000)
- The World Below: Deeper and Stranger #1–4 (Dec 1999 – Mar 2000)
- Dark Horse Maverick 2000 #0 (Jul 2000)
- Last Day in Vietnam OGN (Jul 2000)
- The Last Temptation TPB, by Neil Gaiman, Alice Cooper and Michael Zulli (Nov 2000) - reprint of the Marvel Music issues (1994)
- Will Eisner's Shop Talk TPB (Jun 2001)
- Dark Horse Maverick 2001 #1 (Jul 2001)
- Ancient Joe #1–3 (Oct–Dec 2001)
- Harlequin Valentine OGN (Nov 2001)
- Dark Horse Maverick Annual: Happy Endings #1 (Sep 2002)
- Will Eisner's Hawks of the Seas OGN (Jul 2003)
- AutobioGraphix OGN (Dec 2003)

==== Other ====
- Aliens vs. Predator #0, 1–4 (Jun–Dec 1990)
- Aliens: Earth War #1–4 (Jun–Oct 1990)
- The Terminator #1–4 (Aug–Nov 1990)
- Indiana Jones and the Fate of Atlantis #1–3 (Mar–Jul 1991)
- Predator: Big Game #1–4 (Mar–Jun 1991)
- Deadface: Doing the Islands with Bacchus #1–3 (Jul–Sep 1991)
- The Terminator: One Shot #1 (Jul 1991)
- The Terminator: Secondary Objectives #1–4 (Jul–Oct 1991)
- Batman Versus Predator #1–3 (Dec 1991 – Feb 1992)
- The Eyeball Kid #1–3 (Apr–Jun 1992)
- Deadface: Earth, Water, Air and Fire #1–4 (Jul–Oct 1992)
- Dark Horse Comics #1–2 (Aug–Sep 1992)
- Nina's All-Time Greatest Collector's Item Classic Comics #1 (Aug 1992)
- Rio at Bay #2 (Aug 1992)
- The Terminator: Endgame #1–3 (Sep–Oct 1992)
- The 1001 Nights of Bacchus (May 1993)
- Aliens/Predator: The Deadliest of the Species #1–7 (Jul 1993 – Aug 1994)
- The Jam #6–8 (Oct 1993 – Feb 1995)
- Indiana Jones and the Arms of Gold #1–4 (Feb–May 1994)
- American Splendor Special: A Step Out of the Nest #1 (Aug 1994)
- Bacchus Color Special (Apr 1995)
- Indiana Jones and the Sargasso Pirates #1 (Dec 1995 – Mar 1996)
- Usagi Yojimbo #24–109 (Jun 1996 – Jan 2008)
- Harlan Ellison's Dream Corridor Quarterly #1 (Aug 1996)
- Barry Windsor-Smith: Storyteller #1–9 (Oct 1996 – Jul 1997)
- Batman/Aliens #1–2 (Mar–Apr 1997)
- Tales to Offend #1 (Jul 1997)
- Sin City: Family Values OGN (Oct 1997)
- Bad Boy #1 (Dec 1997)
- Martha Washington Saves the World #1–3 (Dec 1997 – Feb 1998)
- Star Wars: Crimson Empire #1–6 (Dec 1997 – May 1998)
- 300 #1–5 (May–Sep 1998)
- Madman/The Jam #1–2 (Jul–Aug 1998)
- Sin City: Just Another Saturday Night #1 (Oct 1998)
- Star Wars: Crimson Empire II: Council of Blood #1–6 (Nov 1998 – Apr 1999)
- Dr. Robot Special #1 (Apr 2000)
- Madman Comics #17–20 (Aug–Dec 2000)
- Star Wars Tales #10, 14, 16, 20 (Dec 2001 – June 2004)
- Flaming Carrot & Reid Fleming, World's Toughest Milkman #1 (Dec 2002)
- Star Wars: A Valentine Story (Feb 2003)
- The Will Eisner Sketchbook HC (Dec 2003)
- Michael Chabon Presents... the Amazing Adventures of the Escapist #1–8 (Feb 2004 Nov 2005)
- Creatures of the Night OGN (Nov 2004)
- The Art of Usagi Yojimbo HC (Dec 2004)
- Concrete: The Human Dilemma #1–6 (Dec 2004 – May 2005)
- Sexy Chix OGN (Jan 2006)
- De:TALES OGN (Jun 2006)
- The Escapists #1–6 (Jul–Dec 2006)
- It Rhymes with Lust OGN (Mar 2007)
- Martha Washington Dies #1 (Jul 2007)
- The Art of Bone HC (Jul 2007)
- The Art of Matt Wagner's Grendel HC (Sep 2007)
- The Facts in the Case of the Departure of Miss Finch OGN (Jan 2008)

==== As editor, collected editions ====
- Martha Washington Goes To War TPB (Nov 1995)
- Sin City: Booze, Broads, & Bullets TPB (Dec 1998)
- 300 HC (Aug 1999)
- Too Much Coffee Man's Parade of Tirade TPB (1999)
- Too Much Coffee Man's Amusing Musings TPB (Dec 2001)
- Billi 99 TPB (Oct 2002)
- Pop Gun War: Gift TPB (Jun 2003)
- Mother, Come Home TPB (2003)
- Frank Miller's Sin City Vol. 1 (Dec 2004)
- Frank Miller's Sin City Vol. 5 (Mar 2005)
- Frank Miller's Sin City Vol. 6 (Mar 2005)
- Harlan Ellison's Dream Corridor Vol. 2 TPB (Mar 2007)
- The Escapists HC (Dec 2007)
- Batman/Grendel TPB (Feb 2008)

==== Dark Horse Books ====
- Eisner/Miller, edited with Charles Brownstein

== Awards and Honours ==
She has won an Inkpot Award and the 2006 Friends of Lulu Award for Women of Distinction, and was also nominated in the (long-discontinued) Eisner "Best Editor" category in 1992, 1994, and 1995 for her work on a range of titles.

In addition to editing multiple books which have received Eisner and Harvey Awards, she has edited a handful of titles which have won the Eisner Award for "Best Anthology" — award-winning anthologies are often seen as the de facto 'editor's award' since their success depends far more on the editor than do other comics. She also—with artist Tim Sale—won the 2006 Haxtur Award for the Planeta deAgostini Spanish translation of their short story "Young Love" from Solo #1.

- Inkpot Award (1989)
- Eisner Award for Best Anthology (1999) for Grendel: Black, White, and Red by Matt Wagner
- Eisner Award for Best Anthology (2005) for The Amazing Adventures of the Escapist by various
- Harvey Award for Best Anthology (2005) (tied with Chris Ware for McSweeney's Quarterly Concern #13) for The Amazing Adventures of the Escapist by various
- Haxtur Award (2006) for "Young Love" in Solo #1, with artist Tim Sale
- Friends of Lulu Award for Women of Distinction (2006)
- Canadian Comic Book Creator Hall of Fame (2009)

She says that:

... one of the best moments of my life, before I ever began working with Will Eisner, was accepting an Eisner Award from him on stage and having him kiss me. I was standing in front of the microphone ... and my acceptance speech went right out of my head. All I could say was, 'Oh my God, Will Eisner just kissed me!'

- Honorary Doctor of Letters (DLitt), University of British Columbia, 2026.
