= Comico: The Comic Company =

Defunct American comic book publisher

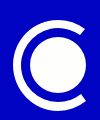
- Industry: Comics
- Founded: 1982
- Founder: Gerry Giovinco, Bill Cucinotta
- Defunct: 1997
- Headquarters: Norristown, Pennsylvania
- Key people: Geraldine Pecht (art director); Bob Schreck (administrative director); Mark Hamlin (sales and marketing rep); Diana Schutz (editor-in-chief)

Comico: The Comic Company was an American comic book publisher headquartered in Norristown, Pennsylvania. Its best-known comics include the Robotech adaptations, the Jonny Quest continuation written by co-creator Doug Wildey, and Matt Wagner's Mage: The Hero Discovered and Grendel. Once considered a major contender on the American market, Comico went into bankruptcy in 1990, although it continued to sporadically publish books until 1997. In 2009, two of Comico's original founders launched an original webcomics site called CO_{2} Comics, which they explained was the reincarnation of Comico.

== History ==
=== Origins ===
Comico was founded in 1982 by a group of artists and publishers who had previously printed a local school paper called Duckwork in the Norristown area. Their first book, Primer #1, attempted to establish a large black-and-white line, featuring the premiere stories of Victor, Slaughterman, Az, Mr. Justice and Skrog. Slaughterman, Az, and Skrog made it out of the pages of Primer #1 and into their own brief titles, while Victor would continue to appear in each issue of Comico Primer.

Primer #2 would premiere what would be Comico's flagship title for most of its existence: Grendel. Matt Wagner's Grendel quickly leaped from Primer into three issues of its own black-and white-series before Comico ended its black-and-white titles in 1984 with Primer #6. Sam Kieth's character The Maxx—later to have his own Image Comics title—was first seen in Primer #5. Chuck Dixon's Evangeline debuted in Primer #6 and thereafter received its own standalone title.

=== The move to color ===
In March 1984 Comico introduced its color line of comics with:

- Mage: The Hero Discovered (hand-painted pages)
- Evangeline – Chuck Dixon's first comic writing venture with co-creator Judith Hunt's pencils and hand-painting, and Ricardo Villagrán's inks
- Elementals by Bill Willingham (in flat color)

Although an ownership dispute led to Evangeline moving to First Comics to be continued for two more years, Comico landed a major license in Robotech, with 1984 seeing the debut of Macross, which continued in 1985 as Robotech: The Macross Saga, along with the debut of two additional Robotech series, Robotech Masters (adapting Southern Cross) and Robotech: The Next Generation (adapting MOSPEADA). The three series produced a schedule that released a Robotech comic book once every two weeks, until the license for Robotech moved to Eternity Comics in 1988. Next Man debuted in 1984, although another ownership dispute led to Next Man soon moving to another publisher. This was offset in 1986, when Comico acquired Justice Machine and the Elementals from the defunct Texas Comics.

The company continued to pick up other licenses, producing a Jonny Quest series (and Jezebel Jade spin-off), a Star Blazers series, and a planned Max Headroom 3-D issue (unpublished). Ken Steacy illustrated a Harlan Ellison graphic novel. Dave Stevens's The Rocketeer and Space Ghost also made the line-up.

Other series included The Maze Agency and Ginger Fox.

=== Bankruptcy ===
While Comico had proven to be a serious contender as a major independent comic company, a mid-1986 decision to distribute to the newsstand market doomed the company. The direction significantly raised the number of prints for each issue, but also increased the number of issues being sent back that did not sell. Refunds for those returned issues ate into the publisher's budget very quickly (and, among other things, they had trouble paying their printing bills). In response to this, Comico began to push out a number of new titles, aimed at spreading out the number of returned comics between various titles. In 1988 they began distributing their titles to the bookstore market, and in 1989 partnered with DC Comics to distribute their comics to a wider market.

Despite these measures, however, and with the end of the Mage, Grendel and Robotech series, much of the reliable revenue for the company dried up. Many of the company's long-time artists and publishers jumped ship and, by 1989, Comico had cancelled half its titles and was deep into bankruptcy. Fish Police and Trollords were picked up by Apple Comics, while The Trouble with Girls was acquired by Malibu Comics and Justice Machine and The Maze Agency went to Innovation Publishing. Comico suspended operations in 1990, with E-Man #3.

=== Andrew Rev ===
In 1990, the owners of the company sold Comico to Andrew Rev, who released the rest of the original staff and began working on relaunching the company. With the planned relaunch, Rev held onto as many of the original Comico series he could.

Most significantly hit were Matt Wagner's creations Mage and Grendel. Mage II: The Hero Defined, expected out in 1989, was not published until the late 1990s. Both Comico and Wagner had jointly copyrighted Mage and Grendel, and with Comico in bankruptcy, that half of the copyright was claimed as a company asset. A two-part Batman/Grendel crossover, Devil's Riddle and Devil's Masque, was written and drawn by Wagner and colored at the time of the Comico series, but was delayed by Comico's bankruptcy. It was eventually published by DC in 1993. Wagner regained sole copyright of Grendel that same year, and, much later, Mage, publishing the series through Dark Horse Comics and Image Comics respectively.

While losing Wagner's characters, Rev did manage to buy Elementals for his restart. Comico began printing again in 1992 with various Elementals-related comics, and in 1993 flooded the market with various one-shot Elementals specials. Rev also acquired Northstar Publishing. Budgetary problems and conflicts with creators over payments led to Comico's presses going silent again until 1995, with yet another Elementals title (running three issues), and various Elementals spin-offs never making it past their first or second issues. Northstar continued publishing material as late as 1995. Comico's line ended in 1997 with Elementals Sex Special vol. 2, #2, illustrated by Frank Quitely and Elementals: The Vampires Revenge #2, the second installment of a four-issue limited series starring the spin-off character Ratman, illustrated by Kelly McQuain.

=== CO_{2} Comics ===
In 2009, Comico co-founders Gerry Giovinco and Bill Cucinotta launched the webcomic site CO_{2} Comics. The site hosted several of the comics from the Comico Primer, including work by Reggie Byers, Bernie Mireault, Rich Rankin, and Neil Vokes.

As of May 2022, the website is no longer online.

== Titles published ==
=== Original titles ===
- Comico Christmas Special (1988), #1
- Comico Primer (1982–1984), #1–6
- Elementals
  - v1 (1984–1988), #1–29 (continued from Texas Comics)
  - v2 (1989–1993), #1–26
  - v3 (1995–1996), #1–3
  - Elementals Sex Special v1 (1991–1993), #1–4
  - Elementals Sex Special v2 (1996–1997), #1–2
  - Elementals: Ghost of a Chance (1995), #1
  - Elementals: How the War was Won (1996), #1–2
  - Elementals: The Natural Order (1988), TPB (collects Justice Machine Annual #1 from Texas Comics and v1 #1–5)
  - Elementals: The Vampires Revenge (1996), #1–2
  - Elementals: Vortex (1991–1992), #1–2
- Evangeline (1984), #1–2 (continued at First Comics)
- Grendel
  - v1 (1984), #1–3
  - v2 (1986–1990), #1–40
- Mage: The Hero Discovered (1984–1986), #1–15 (continued at Image Comics)
- Silverback (1989), #1–3

=== Other titles (selected) ===
- The Amazon (1989), #1–3
- Bloodscent (1988), #1
- AZ (1983), #1–2
- E-Man
  - v3 (1989), #1 (from First Comics)
  - v4 (1989–1990), #1–4 (continued at Alpha Productions)
- Empire Lanes: Arrival (1990), TPB (as Keyline Books; collects Empire Lanes (1986), #1–4 from Northern Lights Publishing)
- ESC (1996), #1–2
- Fish Police
- Ginger Fox (1988), #1–4
- Gumby
  - Gumby's Summer Fun Special (1987), #1
  - Gumby's Winter Fun Special (1988), #1
- The Jam, Urban Adventure: Super Cool Color Injected Turbo Adventure from Hell (1988), #1
- Jezebel Jade (1988), #1–3
- Jonny Quest
  - Jonny Quest (1986–1987), #1–31
  - Jonny Quest Classic (1987), #1–3
  - Jonny Quest Special (1988), #1–2
- Justice Machine
  - Justice Machine featuring The Elementals (1986), #1–4
  - Justice Machine v2 (1987–1989), #1–29
  - Justice Machine Annual (1989), #1
- The Maze Agency (1988–1989), #1–7 (continued at Innovation)
- Next Man (1985), #1–5
- Ribit! (1989), #1-4 by Frank Thorne
- Robotech
  - Robotech: Macross Saga (1984–1988), #1–36
  - Robotech: Masters (1985–1988), #1–23
  - Robotech: The New Generation (1985–1988), #1–25
  - Robotech: The Graphic Novel (1986), TPB
  - Robotech in 3-D (1987), #1
- The Rocketeer Adventure Magazine (1988–1989), #1–2 (continued at Dark Horse)
- Sam & Max, Freelance Police Special (1989), #1
- Skrog (1983), #1
- Star Blazers v1 (1987), #1–4
- Star Blazers v2 (1989), #1–5
- Space Ghost (1987), #1
- Strike Force America (1992), #1
- Trollords (1988–1989), #1–4 (from Tru Studios, continued at Apple Press)
- The Trouble with Girls (1989), #1–4 (from Eternity, continued at Eternity)
- The World of Ginger Fox (1986), graphic novel

== Sources ==
- Bill Cucinotta and Gerry Giovinco interview, David Anthony Kraft's Comics Interview #5 (July 1983).
