= Grendel (comics) =

Comic book series by Matt Wagner

- Grendel: Devil Tales cover by Matt Wagner

Publication information
- Publisher: Comico Comics; Dark Horse Comics
- Schedule: Monthly; irregular
- Publication date: October 1982 – present
- Main character(s): Hunter Rose, Christine Spar, Brian Li Sung, Orion Assante, Eppy Thatcher, Grendel Prime

Creative team
- Created by: Matt Wagner
- Written by: Matt Wagner

Grendel is a long-running series of comic books originally created by American author Matt Wagner. First published in 1982 by Comico, Wagner later moved publication of the series to Dark Horse. Originally a noir comic in the style of European titles such as Diabolik, it has evolved into, in Wagner's words, a study of the nature of aggression.

== Overview ==
Grendel was the masked identity of Hunter Rose, a successful author. As Grendel, he worked as an assassin before taking control of New York City's organized crime. He first appeared in October 1982 in the anthology Comico Primer, and was given his own series in 1983. This was quickly cancelled due to the publisher's financial troubles. Wagner owned the character, however, so he used the opportunity to re-tell the story of Hunter Rose in a far less conventional style in Grendel: Devil by the Deed, serialized as a backup story in Wagner's series Mage; this was subsequently collected as a 48-page one-shot.

There followed an ongoing series which lasted 40 issues. It was written by Wagner and drawn by a variety of artists, including the Pander Brothers, Bernie Mireault, Tim Sale, John K. Snyder III and others. It began with a story set in the near future, with Christine Spar, Hunter's posthumous biographer, assuming the identity of Grendel to pursue a mission of revenge. The identity passed briefly, and tragically, to her deluded boyfriend Brian Li Sung. After a brief return to stories of Hunter Rose (actually two in-universe fictional novels written by Captain Wiggins, a supporting character from the Christine Spar arc), Wagner then spun the series further into the future, with the Grendel identity affecting a variety of people. The name Grendel took on several meanings as the stories portrayed a dystopian future. Grendel became a synonym for The Devil with the title held by the emperor of the world (Grendel-Khan) and members of a warrior society identical to samurai.

The publishing rights languished for several years after Comico's bankruptcy, but Grendel resurfaced at Dark Horse Comics with the ten-part series Grendel: War Child, written by Wagner. Dark Horse subsequently launched Grendel Tales, stories set in the world established by Wagner, created by other writers and artists, including Darko Macan and Edvin Biuković. The main story has also continued in novel form, written by Greg Rucka.

In the years since the publishing of War Child, Wagner has occasionally written short stories featuring Hunter Rose. In 2007, he launched an eight-issue miniseries, Behold the Devil, which reveals a secret of the character. In 2019, Wagner released Devil's Odyssey, returning to the dystopian future of Grendel-Prime.

== Publication history ==
=== The early stories ===
Hunter Rose as Grendel, art by Matt Wagner

Comico Primer #2 (Oct. 1982) contained the first Grendel story, introducing debonair master-criminal Hunter Rose and his nemesis, Argent the wolf. Grendel soon got his own black-and-white title, published by Comico, which lasted three issues. It ended prematurely, mid-story, because of Comico's financial issues. Wagner considers these stories a "rough draft". These issues, along with the aforementioned Grendel story from Comico Primer #2, were collected for the first time ever in the Grendel Archives collection in 2007, just in time for the 25th anniversary of the publication of the first Grendel story. The collection included an introduction by Wagner explaining the situation which led to the creation of Grendel, and dismissing rumors that he was unhappy to have the early work available.

=== Devil by the Deed ===
As a backup story in his other series, Mage (1984–1986), appearing from issues #6 to 14, Wagner reworked and retold Hunter Rose's story in its entirety. It was collected by Comico in 1986. A new edition, recolored by Bernie Mireault, was published by Dark Horse in 1993. In 2007, it was released in hardcover colored only in black, white, and red. In 2023, a "Master's Edition" was released by Dark Horse Comics, expanding the story from 37 pages to 120.

The story begins with an extraordinarily gifted boy named Eddie. Because victory in his endeavors comes so easily, it all seems meaningless. In despair, he throws a world-championship fencing match and becomes romantically involved with Jocasta Rose, a trainer twice his age. When Jocasta dies, Eddie leaves behind his life and takes on two new identities: Hunter Rose, successful novelist and socialite, and Grendel, elegant costumed assassin and later crime boss. Grendel is hunted relentlessly by Argent, a several hundred year old Native American man-wolf cursed with a thirst for violence. Argent works with the police in an effort to turn his curse to good.

Hunter Rose later adopts Stacy Palumbo, the young daughter of a mobster he killed. Stacy also befriends Argent. Hunter is a loving father to Stacy, but she betrays him to Argent when she discovers that he is Grendel. Grendel and the wolf fight on the roof of a Masonic temple. The battle results in Argent's paralysis and Grendel's death and unmasking. The police discover Stacy's role in this incident and that she murdered a governess to prevent interference with her plan. Developing severe psychological problems, Stacy is committed to a mental hospital until adulthood. After she is released, she marries her psychiatrist, but on their wedding night he rapes her and then commits suicide. The traumatic experience is enough that Stacy returns to institutionalization for the rest of her life. After she returns to the institution, she gives birth to a daughter named Christine Spar.

Christine Spar later publishes a biography of Hunter Rose and his life as Grendel, the source of the excerpts seen throughout the comics, which she entitles "Devil by the Deed". It becomes a bestseller and makes Grendel a pop culture icon.

=== Grendel – the series ===
The ongoing Grendel series was published by Comico from 1986 to 1990, with Wagner as writer (and occasionally drawing short story arcs) collaborating with a variety of artists. This series was nominated for an Eisner Awards for Best Continuing Series, Best Single Issue (#12), earned Matt Wagner a nomination for Best Writer, and the Pander Brothers & Jay Geldof a nomination for Best Art Team. The first fifteen issues relate different stories of people who are inspired by their circumstances to assume the identity of Grendel, a choice which seems destined to end in tragedy. There is a recurring idea that these people are influenced by the Grendel identity as if it is a force or entity that chooses to possess them.

==== Issues #1–12: Devil's Legacy ====
Christine Spar as Grendel, art by Matt Wagner

A collected edition was published by Comico in 1988. Dark Horse re-published Devil's Legacy, recolored by Jeromy Cox, as a 12-issue miniseries in 2000 and a collected edition in 2002.

The first twelve issues, written and colored by Wagner and drawn by Arnold and Jacob Pander, were set in the near future and told the story of Stacy Palumbo's daughter, Christine Spar. Christine's son Anson is kidnapped by a vampire Kabuki dancer, Tujiro XIV. She takes on the identity of Grendel to rescue her child or avenge him, if necessary. The longer she operates as Grendel, Christine's behavior and personality become increasingly violent.

The new Grendel's activities draw the attention of the NYPD, in particular Captain Wiggins, whose cybernetic eye acts as a lie detector. Wiggins enlists the aid of Hunter Rose's arch-enemy Argent. Eventually, Christine and Argent fight, resulting in both of their deaths.

==== Issues #13–15: The Devil Inside ====
Issues #13–15 were written by Wagner, drawn by Bernie Mireault, and colored by Wagner, Mireault and Joe Matt. A collected edition was published by Comico in 1990. It was republished as a miniseries by Dark Horse in 2001 and a collected edition in 2004.

The story follows directly from Devil's Legacy and focuses on Brian Li Sung, the stage manager with Tujiro's Kabuki group who met and romanced Christine Spar during her time as Grendel. After Spar's death, Captain Wiggins hounds Brian. Wiggins believes Brian can lead him to Christine's journals and secrets they hold about Grendel. Brian becomes increasingly confused and irrational, believing the spirit of Grendel is telling him to take action.

Brian finally adopts the Grendel identity and then attempts to murder Wiggins. During the battle, Brian Li Sung's true personality reasserts control and denies the influence of the spirit of Grendel, giving Wiggins the opportunity to shoot and kill him.

==== Issues #16–19: Devil Tracks and Devil Eyes ====
When Bernie Mireault asked Wagner if Grendel could ever inhabit a crowd, Wagner was inspired to re-imagine the whole series. Starting with #16, he broke from the "next person puts on the mask" theme that connected the previous stories and instead had Captain Wiggins relate untold tales of Hunter Rose. Devil Tracks appeared in Grendel #16–17; Devil Eyes appeared in Grendel #18–19. Both were written and drawn by Wagner. Dark Horse republished them as a two-issue miniseries, Grendel Classics: Devil Tracks and Grendel Classics: Devil Eyes, in 1995, and collected them as Grendel: Devil Tales in 1999, now out of print.

The now-retired Captain Wiggins is asked to write about his experiences concerning Brian Li Sung and Christine Spar decades earlier. Not wishing to dredge up old ghosts from his past, Wiggins decides instead to tell stories concerning Hunter Rose, the original Grendel whom he never met. One story centers on NYPD Lt. Lewis Polk, who investigates a diamond smuggling operation supposedly engineered by Rose. Another story told by Wiggins expands on informant Tommy Nuncio, a character briefly mentioned in Devil by the Deed.

==== Issues #20–23: The Incubation Years ====
These four issues feature one-off stories, each taking place further into the future. They were written by Wagner and drawn by Hannibal King and Tim Sale. According to Dark Horse editor Diana Schutz and creator Matt Wagner, the original art for issues #20–22 had deteriorated to the point where the issues could not be reprinted. They were eventually reprinted in the third Grendel Omnibus.

After publishing stories of Hunter Rose (the same stories featured in issues #16–19), Captain Wiggins has become wealthy and famous. Christine Spar's earlier biography of Hunter Rose made Grendel a pop culture icon and now Wiggins's work has revived interest in the figure, making him a household name once more.

Wiggins then becomes concerned when the vision in his cybernetic eye becomes distorted, making others (including his new young wife) appear as grotesque caricatures. Physicians conclude the distortion is a result of stress brought on by newfound celebrity. Wiggins concludes that his lie-detector eye has become enhanced and now reveals the true ugliness of the world and that he is surrounded by greedy, shallow people who covet his fame and wealth. As his anger and paranoia increase, Wiggins is finally enraged by his wife's nagging and murders her. After his rage subsides, he calmly waits for the police to arrest him.

The following three issues are more experimental than previous issues of the series, depicting the growth of the concept of Grendel from pop-culture villain to synonym for Satan, against a background of political upheaval, social breakdown, nuclear war and environmental catastrophe. Over the four issues, it is made implicit that 'Grendel' is indeed a malevolent spirit and he acts as the narrator, mocking the frailties of the characters and explaining how their actions benefit him.

==== Issues #24–33: God and the Devil ====
Eppy Thatcher as Grendel, art by John K. Snyder III

God and the Devil, written by Wagner, drawn by John K. Snyder III and Jay Geldhof and colored by Joe Matt, ran in Grendel #24–33 and takes place during the 26th century. It was republished as a ten-issue miniseries, recolored by Jeromy Cox, by Dark Horse in 2003. A trade-paper collection of all 10 issues was published in 2008.

In the 26th century, much of Earth is contaminated and unfit for life. America is fragmented into a number of corporate "systems" dominated by a corrupt Catholic Church, now based in "Vatican Ouest" in Colorado and led by Pope Innocent XLII, who is greedily taxing resources to build a huge, ostentatious tower. Unknown to the public, Pope Innocent XLII is actually the vampire Tujiro, who centuries ago inspired Christine Spar to become the second Grendel and whose associate Brian Li Sung became the third Grendel. The true purpose of the Pope's new tower is not pride but to house a weapon called the Sun Gun, which will block sunlight from reaching Earth.

Orion Assante, a corporate auditor and wealthy aristocrat, tries to work within the system to stem the Church's financial corruption. Meanwhile, a factory worker named Eppy Thatcher becomes corrupted by a designer drug called Grendel. Convinced that God hates him and fueled by the drug, Thatcher becomes the new Grendel and acts as an anti-Church terrorist. Orion Assante feels his efforts to fight the Vatican's corruption are overshadowed by this terrorist who uses a blasphemous costume and alias (as Grendel has now long been associated as another name for the Devil).

To combat this threat, the Church establishes a second Inquisition. Pellon Cross, head of the mercenary Confederacy Of Police (COP), is hired to provide added security. Tujiro uses Cross to retrieve materials needed to complete the Sun Gun. As an afterthought, he turns Cross into a vampire servant.

As the story goes on, Orion Assante is driven to desperation following the deaths of his loved ones and leads a private army to destroy the Sun Gun. Pellon Cross escapes Tujiro's clutches and turns a number of his fellow COPs into vampires, enlisting their allegiance against the Pope. Thatcher, Pellon's vampires and Orion's army all attack the Vatican tower and it is destroyed before the Sun Gun is activated. Tujiro and Thatcher apparently perish in the process.

==== Issues #34–40: Devil's Reign ====
Orion Assante, the first Grendel-Khan, art by Tim Sale

Devil's Reign, written by Wagner, drawn by Sale and colored by Mireault, ran in Grendel #34–40. Grendel went on what was intended to be temporary hiatus, but Comico's subsequent bankruptcy meant instead that this story was now the close of the series. It was republished as a seven-issue miniseries, recolored by Matt Hollingsworth, by Dark Horse in 2004. A trade-paper collection of all seven issues was released in 2008. It follows the events of God and the Devil, taking place in the 26th century.

Following the destruction of the Church, much of society crumbles. A community of vampires, led by Pellon Cross, establishes itself in the sovereign nation of VEGAS. Orion Assante, using his corporate connections and private wealth, gradually restores order through use of his army and a broadcasting network, both called Orion's Sword. For his role in bringing down the Church, Orion is nicknamed Grendel by others.

In securing its borders, the newly united North America absorbs South America, Central America and Australia, presenting these conquests as corporate mergers. Other world powers, including China, Japan and Africa, are alarmed.

On a state visit to Africa, the world's only remaining nuclear power, Orion's wife Sherri Caniff is abducted by an African nationalist faction. Suspecting African government involvement, Orion sends forces to simultaneously seize the nuclear silos and free Sherri. Once in control of Africa, Orion discovers that Japan was behind the kidnapping. A state of cold war develops, with corresponding military build-up.

The unauthorized conquests of territories in Asia by a renegade general brings Orion's Sword to the borders of China. The formerly aloof superpower then allies with Japan and global war results. The war does not go well for Orion, as his forces are overstretched and suffer many setbacks and defeats. In the midst of this, Sherri Caniff dies of cancer.

Orion comes to believe he is actually possessed by the devil, by the spirit of Grendel. He disappears from public life and tracks down Eppy Thatcher, who is alive, hiding in the sewers beneath Vegas. Interrogating Eppy, Orion has an inspiration. Adapting the technology of Tujiro's sun gun, Orion develops a new weapon called the Sun-Disk and devastates Japan. China surrenders, making Orion Assante ruler of Earth, Orion I.

Embracing his originally derogatory nickname, Assante names his personal troops Grendels, the title now indicative of high-status and respect. As their leader, Orion I adopts the title of Grendel-Khan. The spirit of Grendel has, in effect, conquered the world. To ensure he has an heir to the world he's built, and unwilling to trust anyone else to do it for him, he uses advanced technology to impregnate himself and gives birth to a son, Jupiter.

Each part of the main story is presented as a history text written by Assante's stepdaughter and panels with the characters are presented like archived footage. A more traditional approach was done on the backup strips, which depicted the history of the vampire community as a counterpoint to Assante's rise.

=== Silverback ===
In 1989 Silverback, a three-issue miniseries written by Wagner and William Messner-Loebs and drawn by Messner-Loebs and John Peck, told the story of Argent the wolf's origin in a tale based on Native American mythology. Wagner has said that, due to problems with the original source material, which has deteriorated over time, it is unlikely that this will ever be collected or reprinted in any way.

=== Devil's Whisper ===
The short piece Devil's Whisper was published in 1989 in A1 Book 4. It was written by James Robinson and drawn by D'Israeli. The story takes place in between issues #15 and 16, and concerns Captain Wiggins briefly wearing Brian Li Sung's Grendel mask.

=== War Child ===
Grendel-Prime, art by Matt Wagner

As Devil's Reign came to a close, Wagner thought of an idea for a new storyline, which was intended to run as Grendel #41–50, after a brief publishing hiatus. Before that could happen, though, Comico went bankrupt. Finally, after Wagner regained the publishing rights, Grendel: War Child saw print in 1992 as a 10-issue miniseries from Dark Horse, written by Wagner, drawn by Patrick McEown and colored by Mireault. A collected edition was published in 1994.

Ten years after the death of Orion I, his son Jupiter is kidnapped from his home/prison at a base in the Dakota Black Hills by a lone Grendel in full black body armor. This Grendel is known to others as the paladin, and later adopts the name of Grendel-Prime. Orion's widow Laurel Kennedy, now regent, sends the empire's elite soldiers known as Red Devils after the renegade Grendel and his hostage. In the process of her rulership, Laurel further neglects and alienates her daughter Crystal.

Jupiter and the Grendel paladin flee to the jungles of Africa. Along the way, they cross wastelands, ruined cities and oceans, encountering not only the Red Devils but also bandits, mutants, pirates, dangerous wildlife, and other Grendels (both friend and foe). In the OPEC wastes, Grendel and Jupiter are captured by a band of rebels opposed to Laurel Kennedy. Grendel-Prime is disassembled and revealed as a solar-powered cyborg created by Orion I to protect Jupiter from political manipulators until he is old enough to assume the throne of the Grendel-Khan.

Jupiter is abducted from the rebel base by a group of vampires who take him to their lair in Siberia. The rebels and their charismatic leader, Azif a-Barouk, accompany Grendel-Prime to rescue the boy. Grendel-Prime slays the vampires' lord in the process—who turns out to be none other than Orion Assante's old foe, Pellon Cross.

Laurel Kennedy's rule is undermined by the lack of an heir, so she decides to arrange a suitable dynastic marriage for her daughter. Crystal, however, is having a secret affair with her Grendel guard, Susan Veraghen. Rather than be forced into marriage, Crystal escapes the Black Hills complex and flees into the wilderness. Laurel becomes increasingly irrational, and effective rule of the empire passes to her minister, Abner Heath.

Ten years later, Laurel Kennedy is quietly displaced and imprisoned by Abner Heath, who becomes the acting leader of Earth. To hold the empire together, Heath wants to activate the Sun-Disc, Orion's most formidable weapon, but meets with continual failure. Jupiter (now a young man) and Grendel-Prime act against the empire. Grendel-Prime and his team capture the Imperial palace and Jupiter raids the Black Hills complex, encountering his now frail and sickly mother. It is discovered that the missing component of the Sun-Disk is contained within the body of Grendel-Prime. He activates the weapon and destroys the government's broadcasting satellites, enabling Jupiter to take over the airwaves and announce his succession. After Jupiter's coronation, Grendel-Prime takes his leave of Jupiter and disappears into the wastelands.

=== Batman/Grendel I ===
A two-part Batman/Grendel crossover, Devil's Riddle and Devil's Masque, was written and drawn by Wagner and colored by Wagner at the time of the Comico series, but was delayed by Comico's bankruptcy. It was finally published by DC Comics in 1993.

The story assumes that Hunter Rose and Batman live in the same fictional universe and are contemporaries. Bored with Argent the Wolf and the NYPD, Hunter Rose comes to Gotham City to challenge Batman (as the city's protector) to stop him before he commits an audacious crime. Rose becomes increasingly impressed with Batman but is still able to accomplish his crime, although Batman's interference proves to be more trouble than Rose expected. Grendel unintentionally endangers a child and indirectly causes the death of someone Grendel did not consider an enemy. Grendel and Batman's final battle results in a broken arm for the assassin who barely escapes Gotham.

Returning to New York, Hunter Rose concludes that he should be satisfied with the challenges provided by Argent the Wolf and the NYPD rather than risk further challenging the Batman and attracting his notice. Hunter Rose says that Batman is not a wolf but a tiger, indicating the hero is too dangerous and too much like himself to risk making a true enemy.

Although this story can be seen as out of continuity, Hunter Rose is depicted with a broken arm in the "Devil's Advocate" short, featured in Grendel: Black, White, & Red.

=== Grendel Tales ===
Grendel Tales is an irregular series of stories by other writers and artists set in the world Wagner had created. It was intended to follow the original comic series, but Comico's bankruptcy derailed this plan (Grendel #40 did contain a short story by Steven T. Seagle and Ho Che Anderson, starting this idea). Grendel Tales finally began in 1993, published by Dark Horse as a series of miniseries.

- Four Devils, One Hell by James Robinson and Teddy Kristiansen (1993): This story features the skull of Hunter Rose. The skull has a hole in the forehead, though it is not explained in the story why this is. The reason is revealed in the 1996 Batman/Grendel crossover.
- Devil's Hammer by Rob Walton (1994)
- The Devil in Our Midst by Steven T. Seagle and Paul Grist (1994)
- Devils and Deaths by Darko Macan and Edvin Biuković (1994)
- Homecoming by Patrick McEown (1994)
- Devil's Choices by Darko Macan and Edvin Biuković (1995)
- The Devil May Care by Terry LaBan and Peter Doherty (1995)
- The Devil's Apprentice by Jeffrey Lang and Steve Lieber (1997)

=== Devil Quest ===
Wagner wrote and painted a series of short stories as backups in Grendel Tales, starting in 1994 and collected in 1995. A hardcover collection of the story was released in June 2008.

Set 104 years after War Child, these back-up stories feature the Grendel-Khan, Jupiter Assante III, as he attempts to find Grendel-Prime in the wastelands. The cyborg, disillusioned by the decadence of the world, is attempting a bloody experiment/ritual to contact the soul of Hunter Rose, his namesake.

The ritual seems to work and Grendel-Prime disappears. He later reappears some distance away, badly damaged. What happened when he vanished and why he was damaged was not explained until 1996 with the publication of the second Batman/Grendel crossover.

=== Grendel Cycle ===
In 1995, Grendel Cycle was published. It is a 64-page recap of Grendel's history, written by Matt Wagner and with art pulled from issues of the original series. It also contains an all-new 8-page primer, written and painted by Wagner, showcasing various characters and events from the series; a timeline of the Grendel legacy, giving some new information about the characters; and a cover gallery for the 40-issue Comico series and the War Child miniseries.

=== Batman/Grendel II ===
The second two-part Batman/Grendel crossover, titled Devil's Bones and Devil's Dance, was published in 1996. It tied directly into events from Devil Quest. A collection of both Batman/Grendel stories was released in hardcover (limited to only 300 copies) and paperback in April 2008.

In the present day, a museum in Gotham City is holding an exhibition of famous murderers, including as its prize exhibit the bones of Hunter Rose, the assassin and crime lord Grendel. In the 26th century, Grendel-Prime's experiment in the story Devil Quest sends him back in time. In the present day, Grendel-Prime materializes in the Gotham City museum, drawn by the "true skull" of his namesake Hunter Rose. With the aid of a kidnapped WayneTech engineer, Grendel-Prime builds a device that will return him to the 26th century and kill thousands in the process, a blood sacrifice to enable contact with Hunter Rose's soul. Batman prevents Grendel-Prime from carrying out the sacrifice.

=== Black, White and Red and Red, White and Black ===
Wagner returned to Hunter Rose in 1998 with a four-issue miniseries, Grendel: Black, White and Red, featuring short stories drawn by an array of artists. As the title suggests, the stories were drawn in black and white with red spot-color. A second series, Grendel: Red, White and Black, followed in 2002. Some of the artists included D'Israeli, Duncan Fegredo, David Mack, Mike Allred, Teddy Kristiansen, Woodrow Phoenix, Chris Sprouse, Stan Sakai, Jill Thompson, Kelley Jones, Andi Watson, Ashley Wood and Michael Zulli and Stan Shaw.

The collected versions of these two limited series also contain several short Grendel stories Wagner had published over the years, such as "Devil's Vagary" (a 16-page one-shot from the Comico Collection slipcase), "The Devil's Week" (from A Decade of Dark Horse #1), "Midnight Looms" [Scared of the Devil] (from Dark Horse Extra #49–50), and "Devils Duel" (from Dark Horse Maverick 2001).

=== Devil Child ===
In 1999 a two-part series, Grendel: Devil Child, written by Diana Schutz and drawn by Tim Sale, told the harrowing story of Stacy Palumbo and the birth of her daughter, Christine Spar. A hardcover collection of the story was released in June 2008.

=== Past Prime ===
In 2000, Grendel: Past Prime, a novel written by Greg Rucka with illustrations by Wagner, was published, following the adventures of Grendel-Prime and Susan Veraghen after the assassination of Jupiter I.

=== Behold the Devil ===
In July 2007, Dark Horse debuted the new Hunter Rose series Grendel: Behold the Devil with a 50¢ #0 issue. This was released during 2007, the 25th anniversary of Grendel. The first issue hit comic stands in November. The series ran eight issues (nine including #0).

=== Sympathy from the Devil ===
In October 2011, Grendel appeared in the CBLDF's fundraising Liberty Annual in a story addressing the book's "It Gets Better" theme.

=== Grendel vs. The Shadow ===
Dark Horse and Dynamite Entertainment published a three-issue prestige format series featuring a team-up with Grendel and The Shadow entitled Grendel vs. The Shadow, starting in September 2014, written and drawn by Matt Wagner.

=== Devil's Odyssey ===
Dark Horse published a new eight-issue miniseries, Devil's Odyssey, written and drawn by Matt Wagner. The series premiered in October 2019 and features the further adventures of Grendel Prime as he searches for a planet to be a new home for humanity. After a year long delay, due to the COVID-19 pandemic, the final issue was published in July 2021 and a collection was published the same year in December.

=== The Devil's Distinction ===
In 2022, Matt Wagner contributed a 5-page Hunter Rose story to the Ukraine benefit anthology, Comics for Ukraine: Sunflower Seeds. All profits from the crowdfunded book went directly to refugee relief efforts in war torn Ukraine.

=== Devil's Crucible ===
The first four-issue miniseries in a series of three miniseries, Devil's Crucible - Defiance, was published between July and October 2024, with a hardcover collection following in March 2025. The series is intended to continue with Devil's Crucible - Sedition and Devil's Crucible - Necrotic.

=== Omnibus collections ===
| Title | Material collected | Release date | ISBN |
|---|---|---|---|
| Vol. 1 – Hunter Rose | Grendel: Devil by the Deed 25th Anniversary Edition, Grendel: Black, White & Red #1–4, Grendel: Red, White & Black #1–4, Grendel: Behold the Devil, stories from Comico Collection, Decade: A Dark Horse Short Story Collection, issues #49–50 of Dark Horse Extra, Dark Horse Maverick 2001, and Liberty Annual 2011 | August 2012 | 978-1-59582-893-4 |
| Vol. 2 – The Legacy | Grendel: Devil Tales, Grendel: Devil Child, Grendel: Devil's Legacy, and Grendel: The Devil Inside | December 2012 | 978-1-59582-894-1 |
| Vol. 3 – Orion's Reign | Grendel: Incubation Years, Grendel: God and the Devil, and Grendel: Devil's Reign | June 2013 | 978-1-59582-895-8 |
| Vol. 4 – Prime | War Child, Devil Quest, and Past Prime | December 2013 | 978-1-59582-896-5 |
| Grendel Tales Vol. 1 | Devil Worship; Four Devils, One Hell; Devil's Hammer; The Devil in our Midst; and Devils and Death | August 2017 | 978-1-5067-0328-2 |
| Grendel Tales Vol. 2 | Homecoming; Devil's Choice; The Devil May Care; and The Devil's Apprentice | January 2018 | 978-1-5067-0329-9 |

== Reception ==
Martin A. Stever reviewed Grendel in Space Gamer/Fantasy Gamer No. 83. Stever commented that "this is one of the most exciting, dynamic, and unusual comic books ever conceived".

== In other media ==
Netflix announced in September 2021 a television series adaptation with Andrew Dabb as showrunner and Abubakr Ali cast as Hunter Rose / Grendel. Other actors would have included Jaime Ray Newman as Jocasta Rose, Julian Black Antelope as Argent, Madeline Zima as Liz Sparks, Kevin Corrigan as Barry Palumbo, Emma Ho as Stacy Palumbo, Erik Palladino as Teddy Ciccone, Brittany Allen as Annabelle Wright and Andy Mientus as Larry Stohler. One year later Netflix was no longer moving ahead with the project, with the producers shopping the show elsewhere.

In November 2026, it was announced that Netflix had ordered an animated series adaptation of Grendel, with Bobak Esfarjani serving as writer and showrunner and BobbyPills providing the animation.

A board game, Grendel: The Game of Crime and Mayhem, was announced by Off the Page Games (publishers of other games based on comic books, like MIND MGMT) in April 2025. It was designed by Alara Cameron and Sen-Foong Lim, and uses art from Wagner and other artists who worked on the comic. It is expected to be published in 2026, following a successful Kickstarter crowdfunding campaign in July 2025.
