= Matt Wagner =

American comics artist and writer (born 1961)

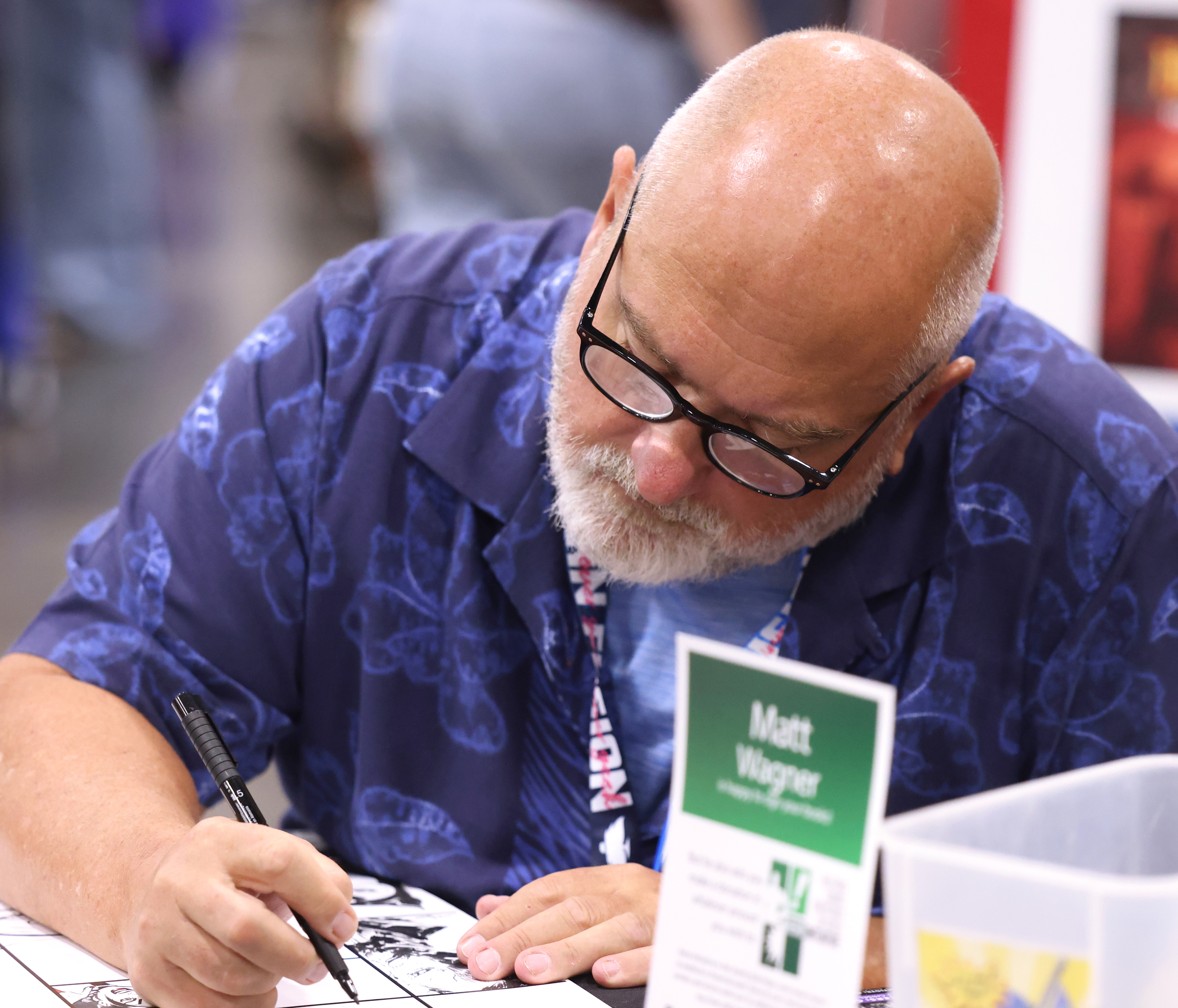
- Wagner in 2025
- Born: October 9, 1961 (age 65)
- Areas: Writer, Penciller, Inker, Letterer, Colourist
- Notable works: Mage; Grendel
- Awards: Inkpot Award, 1988

Matt Wagner (born October 9, 1961) is an American comics artist and writer who is best known as the creator of the series Mage and Grendel.

== Early life, family and education ==
Matt Wagner's childhood was spent in central Pennsylvania (near State College, Pennsylvania) and in Front Royal, Virginia. His mother was an English teacher, and his father, a World War II veteran, worked for a "synthetic fibers corporation".

Even during his grade school years, Wagner knew he wanted to create comic books. He was in the Class of 1979 at Warren County High School in Front Royal, Virginia. For two years he attended college in Virginia at James Madison University, but he transferred to art school at Philadelphia College of Art.

== Career ==
Matt Wagner's first published comic book work was Comico Primer #2 (1982), which was the first appearance of Grendel. In addition to his creator-owned series Mage and Grendel, he has worked on comics featuring the Demon and Batman as well as such titles as Sandman Mystery Theatre. In 1991, he illustrated part of the "Season of Mists" story arc in Neil Gaiman's The Sandman series. He wrote and drew Batman/Superman/Wonder Woman: Trinity a limited series featuring DC's three major heroes in 2003. He followed it with Batman and the Monster Men and Batman and the Mad Monk in 2006.

His other projects include Madame Xanadu for Vertigo, with artist Amy Reeder Hadley. He has produced numerous comics covers, including painted ones for Green Arrow and has written several Green Hornet limited series for Dynamite Entertainment.

Outside comics, Wagner provided art for the 1984 Villains & Vigilantes adventure Battle Above the Earth written by Steven Crow.

In April 2022, Wagner contributed to Operation USA's benefit anthology book, Comics for Ukraine: Sunflower Seeds, a project spearheaded by IDW Publishing Special Projects Editor Scott Dunbier. Its profits were donated to relief efforts for Ukrainian refugees resulting from the February 2022 Russian invasion of Ukraine. Wagner produced a new Grendel story featuring Hunter Rose for the anthology.

Wagner prefers to use Faber-Castell's Pitt Artist Pens.

== Personal life ==
Wagner is married to Barbara Schutz, the sister of his editor, Diana Schutz. They have resided in the Portland, Oregon metro area, including in West Linn, Oregon. Barbara Wagner has worked as an English teacher, like Matt Wagner's mother was. He has mentioned that he has a son.

== Awards and nominations ==
- 1988:
  - Nominated for "Best Writer" Eisner Award, for Grendel
  - Received an Inkpot Award
- 1993:
  - Won "Best Finite Series/Limited Series" Eisner Award, for Grendel: War Child
  - Nominated for "Best Writer/Artist" Eisner Award, for Batman: Legends of the Dark Knight: "Faces"
  - Nominated for "Best Cover Artist" Eisner Award, for Batman: Legends of the Dark Knight: "Faces"
  - Nominated for "Best Inker" Eisner Award, for Grendel: War Child
- 1995: Nominated for "Best Writer" Eisner Award, for Sandman Mystery Theatre
- 1999:
  - Won "Best Anthology" Eisner Award, for Grendel: Black, White, and Red
  - Won "Best Short Story" Eisner Award, for "Devil's Advocate" in Grendel: Black, White, and Red #1
  - Nominated for "Best Writer" Eisner Award, for Grendel: Black, White, and Red
- 2009: Nominated for "Best Writer" Eisner Award, for Zorro and Madame Xanadu.

== Bibliography ==
Mage: The Hero Defined, cover by Matt Wagner

=== Atomeka Press ===
- A1 #2 (1989) (story in anthology)

=== Comic Legends Legal Defense Fund ===
- The True North #1 (1988)
- The True North II #1 (1991)

=== Comico ===
- Grendel #1–3 (1983–1984)
- Grendel vol. 2 #1–40 (1986–1990)
- Mage #1–15 (1984–1986)
- Magebook #1–2 (1985)
- Primer #2, 5 (1982–1983)
- Silverback #1–3 (1989)

=== Dark Horse Comics ===
- Dark Horse Presents #40, 45 (1990) (stories in anthology title)
- Dark Horse Presents Fifth Anniversary Special #1 (1991) (story in anthology title)
- Grendel Tales: Devil's Choices #1 (1995)
- Grendel Tales: Devils and Deaths #1 (1994)
- Grendel Tales: Homecoming #1–3 (1994–1995)
- Grendel Tales: The Devil's Hammer #1–2 (1994)
- Grendel: Behold the Devil #0, #1–8 (2007–2008)
- Grendel: Black, White, and Red #1–4 (1998–1999)
- Grendel: Devil's Legacy #1–5 (2000)
- Grendel: War Child #1–10 (1992–1993)
- The Terminator: One Shot (1991)
- Dracula Book 1: The Impaler (2024)
- Dracula Book 2: The Brides (2025)
- Dracula Book 3: The Count (2026)

=== DC Comics ===
- Batman vol. 3 #54 (2018)
- The Batman Adventures Annual #1 (1994)
- Batman and the Mad Monk #1–6 (2006–2007)
- Batman and the Monster Men #1–6 (2006)
- Batman Black and White #3 (1996)
- Batman/Grendel #1–2 (1993)
- Batman/Grendel vol. 2 #1–2 (1996)
- Batman: Legends of the Dark Knight #28–30 (1992)
- Batman/Riddler: The Riddle Factory #1 (1995)
- Batman/Superman/Wonder Woman: Trinity #1–3 (2003)
- The Demon vol. 2 #1–4 (1987)
- The Demon vol. 3 #22 (1992)
- Doctor Mid-Nite #1–3 (1999)
- The Sandman #25 (1991)
- Secret Origins Special #1 (Riddler story) (1989)
- Who's Who in the DC Universe #4–6, 8, 16 (1990–1992)
- Who's Who: The Definitive Directory of the DC Universe #6 (1985)

==== Vertigo ====
- House of Mystery Halloween Annual #1–2 (2009–2010)
- Madame Xanadu #1–29 (2008–2011)
- Sandman Midnight Theatre #1 (1995)
- Sandman Mystery Theatre #1–60, Annual #1 (1993–1998)
- Vertigo: Winter's Edge #1 (1998)

=== Dynamite Entertainment ===
- Django/Zorro #1–7 (2014–2015)
- Green Hornet: Year One #1–12 (2010–2011)
- Grendel vs. The Shadow (2014)
- The Shadow #100 (2015) (eight page story)
- The Shadow: The Death of Margo Lane (2016)
- The Shadow: Year One #1–10 (2013–2014)
- The Spirit #1–13 (2015–2016)
- Zorro #1–20 (2008–2010)
- Zorro Rides Again #1–12 (2011–2012)

=== Image Comics ===
- Mage: The Hero Defined #0–15 (1997–1999)
- Mage: The Hero Denied #0–15 (2017–2019)

=== Legendary Comics ===
- The Tower Chronicles: Dreadstalker #1–10 (2014–2015)
- The Tower Chronicles: Geisthawk #1–4 (2012–2013)

=== Marvel Comics ===
- Savage Hulk #1 (1996)
- Ultimate Marvel Team-Up #1 (2001)
- Wolverine vol. 2 #9 (one page) (1989)
