= Eisner Award for Best Cover Artist =

Comics Cover Art Award

- Awarded for: Best Cover Artist for Comic Books
- Country: United States
- First award: 1992
- Most recent winner: Javier Rodriguez
- Website: www.comic-con.org/awards/eisner-awards-current-info

The Eisner Award for Best Cover Artist is an award for creative achievement in American comic books, given to an artist of comics cover art.

== Winners and nominees ==
Year	Nominee	Titles	Ref.
1990s
1992	Brian Bolland	Animal Man (DC)	
1992	Simon Bisley	Batman/Judge Dredd: Judgment on Gotham (DC), Doom Patrol (DC)	
1992	Dave Dorman	Indiana Jones and the Fate of Atlantis (Dark Horse), Star Wars (Dark Horse)	
1992	Brendan McCarthy	Shade, the Changing Man (DC Comics)	
1993	Brian Bolland	Animal Man (DC), Wonder Woman (DC)	
1993	Simon Bisley	Grendel: War Child (Dark Horse), The Terminator: Enemy Within (Dark Horse), Doom Patrol (DC)	
1993	Glenn Fabry	Hellblazer (DC), The Spectre (DC)	
1993	Dave Sim/Gerhard	Cerebus (Aardvark-Vanaheim)	
1993	Brendan McCarthy	Shade, the Changing Man (DC Comics)	
1993	Dave McKean	Cages (Tundra), The Sandman (DC)	
1993	Steve Rude	World's Finest trade paperback (DC), Nexus: The Origin (Dark Horse)	
1993	Matt Wagner	"Faces," Batman: Legends of the Dark Knight (DC)	
1994	Brian Bolland	Animal Man (DC), Wonder Woman (DC), Batman: Legends of the Dark Knight #50 (DC)	
1994	John Bolton	Aliens/Predator: The Deadliest of the Species (Dark Horse)	
1994	Glenn Fabry	Hellblazer (DC/Vertigo), Vertigo Jam (DC/Vertigo)	
1994	Alex Ross	Marvels (Marvel)	
1994	Dave Sim/Gerhard	Cerebus (Aardvark-Vanaheim)	
1995	Glenn Fabry	Hellblazer (DC/Vertigo)	
1995	Tony Harris	Starman (DC)	
1995	Terry Moore	Strangers in Paradise (Abstract Studio)	
1995	Don Rosa	Uncle Scrooge (Gladstone)	
1995	Rick Veitch	Roarin' Rick's Rare Bit Fiends (King Hell)	
1995	Charles Vess	The Books of Magic (DC/Vertigo)	
1996	Alex Ross	Kurt Busiek's Astro City (Jukebox Productions/Image)	
1996	Frank Miller	X #18-21 (Dark Horse), Sin City: The Big Fat Kill (Dark Horse), Silent Night (Dark Horse)	
1996	Charles Vess	The Books of Magic (DC/Vertigo), Ice Age on the World of Magic the Gathering (Acclaim/Armada), The Book of Ballads and Sagas #1 (Green Man Press)	
1996	Chris Ware	Acme Novelty Library (Fantagraphics), BLAB! #8 (Kitchen Sink)	
1996	Phil Winslade	Goddess (DC/Vertigo), Vamps: Hollywood & Vein (DC/Vertigo)	
1996	Jim Woodring	Jim (Fantagraphics), Jim Special (Fantagraphics)	
1997	Alex Ross	Kingdom Come, (DC), Kurt Busiek's Astro City (Jukebox Productions/Homage)	
1997	Mark Chiarello	Terminal City (DC/Vertigo)	
1997	Tony Harris	Starman (DC)	
1997	Michael Kaluta	The Books of Magic (DC/Vertigo), Vermillion (Helix)	
1997	Jerry Ordway	The Power of Shazam! (DC)	
1997	Steve Rude	Nexus: Executioner's Song (Dark Horse), Nexus Meets Madman (Dark Horse)	
1998	Alex Ross	Kurt Busiek's Astro City, (Jukebox Productions/Homage), Uncle Sam (DC/Vertigo)	
1998	Mike Allred	Red Rocket 7 (Dark Horse)	
1998	Mark Crilley	Akiko (Sirius)	
1998	Glenn Fabry	Preacher (DC/Vertigo), Preacher Specials (DC/Vertigo)	
1998	Jerry Ordway	The Power of Shazam! (DC)	
1998	Steve Rude	Nexus: Nightmare in Blue (Dark Horse), Nexus: God Con (Dark Horse)	
1998	Ty Templeton	Batman & Robin Adventures (DC)	
1999	Brian Bolland	The Invisibles (DC/Vertigo)	
1999	Glenn Fabry	Preacher (DC/Vertigo), Hellblazer (DC/Vertigo), Aliens vs. Predator: Eternal (Dark Horse)	
1999	Dave McKean	The Dreaming (DC/Vertigo)	
1999	Frank Miller and Lynn Varley	300 (Dark Horse)	
1999	Joe Quesada/Jimmy Palmiotti	Daredevil (Marvel), Painkiller Jane/DarkChylde (Event), Painkiller Jane/Hellboy (Event)	
2000s
2000	Alex Ross	Batman: No Man's Land (DC), Batman: Harley Quinn (DC), Batman: War on Crime (DC), Kurt Busiek's Astro City (Homage/DC/WildStorm), ABC alternate #1 covers (ABC)	
2000	John Cassaday	Planetary (DC/WildStorm)	
2000	Frank Cho	Liberty Meadows (Insight Studios)	
2000	Glenn Fabry	Preacher (DC/Vertigo)	
2000	Dave McKean	The Dreaming (DC/Vertigo)	
2001	Brian Bolland	Batman: Gotham Knights (DC), The Flash (DC), The Invisibles (Vertigo/DC)	
2001	Duncan Fegredo	Lucifer (Vertigo/DC)	
2001	Phil Hale	Swamp Thing (Vertigo/DC), Vertigo Secret Files (Vertigo/DC), Flinch #11 (Vertigo/DC)	
2001	Dave Johnson	Detective Comics (DC), 100 Bullets (Vertigo/DC)	
2001	Chris Ware	Acme Novelty Library (Fantagraphics), Jimmy Corrigan (Pantheon), Drawn & Quarterly vol. 3 (Drawn & Quarterly)	
2002	Dave Johnson	Detective Comics (DC), 100 Bullets (Vertigo/DC)	
2002	Tim Bradstreet	Hellblazer (DC/Vertigo)	
2002	J. G. Jones	Codename: Knockout (DC/Vertigo), Transmetropolitan (DC/Vertigo)	
2002	Jae Lee	Our Worlds at War specials (DC), Fantastic Four: 1234 (Marvel)	
2002	Mike Mignola	Hellboy: Conqueror Worm (Dark Horse Maverick)	
2003	Adam Hughes	Wonder Woman (DC)	
2003	Kaare Andrews	The Incredible Hulk (Marvel)	
2003	Dave Johnson	Detective Comics (DC), 100 Bullets (DC/Vertigo)	
2003	Terry Moore	Strangers in Paradise (Abstract Studio)	
2003	J. H. Williams III	Promethea (ABC)	
2004	James Jean	Batgirl (DC), Fables (Vertigo/DC)	
2004	Dave Johnson	Batman # 620-622 (DC), 100 Bullets (DC/Vertigo)	
2004	Scott McKowen	1602 (Marvel)	
2004	Joshua Middleton	NYX (Marvel), X-Men Unlimited (Marvel), New Mutants (Marvel)	
2004	Sean Phillips	Sleeper (WildStorm/DC)	
2004	Brian Wood	Global Frequency (WildStorm/DC)	
2005	James Jean	Fables (Vertigo/DC), Green Arrow (DC), Batgirl (DC)	
2005	Kieron Dwyer	Remains (IDW)	
2005	Tony Moore	The Walking Dead (Image)	
2005	Frank Quitely	Bite Club (Vertigo/DC), We3 (Vertigo/DC)	
2005	Michael Turner	Identity Crisis (DC)	
2006	James Jean	Fables (Vertigo/DC), Runaways (Marvel)	
2006	Frank Espinosa	Rocketo (Speakeasy)	
2006	Tony Harris	Ex Machina (WildStorm/DC)	
2006	Jock	The Losers (Vertigo/DC)	
2006	Eric Powell	The Goon (Dark Horse), Universal Monsters: Cavalcade of Horror (Dark Horse)	
2007	James Jean	Fables (Vertigo/DC), Jack of Fables (Vertigo/DC), 1001 Nights of Snowfall (Vertigo/DC)	
2007	John Cassaday	Astonishing X-Men (Marvel), Conan (Dark Horse), The Lone Ranger (Dynamite)	
2007	Tony Harris	Conan (Dark Horse), Ex Machina (WildStorm/DC)	
2007	Dave Johnson	100 Bullets (DC/Vertigo), Zombie Tales (Boom!), Cthulhu Tales (Boom!), The Black Plague (Boom!)	
2007	J. G. Jones	52 (DC)	
2008	James Jean	Fables (Vertigo/DC), The Umbrella Academy (Dark Horse), Process Recess 2 (AdHouse), Superior Showcase 2 (AdHouse)	
2008	John Cassaday	Astonishing X-Men (Marvel), The Lone Ranger (Dynamite)	
2008	J. G. Jones	52 (DC)	
2008	Jae Lee	The Dark Tower: The Gunslinger Born (Marvel)	
2008	Jim Lee	All Star Batman & Robin, the Boy Wonder (DC), World of Warcraft (WildStorm/DC)	
2009	James Jean	Fables (Vertigo/DC), The Umbrella Academy (Dark Horse)	
2009	Gabriel Bá	Casanova (Image), The Umbrella Academy (Dark Horse)	
2009	Jo Chen	Buffy the Vampire Slayer (Dark Horse)	
2009	Amy Reeder Hadley	Madame Xanadu (DC/Vertigo)	
2009	Matt Wagner	Zorro (Dynamite)	
2010s
2010	J. H. Williams III	Detective Comics (DC)	
2010	John Cassaday	Irredeemable (Boom!), The Lone Ranger (Dynamite)	
2010	Salvador Larroca	The Invincible Iron Man (Marvel)	
2010	Sean Phillips	Criminal (Marvel/Icon), Incognito (Marvel/Icon), 28 Days Later (Boom!)	
2010	Alex Ross	Astro City: The Dark Age (WildStorm), Project Superpowers (Dynamite)	
2011	Mike Mignola	Hellboy (Dark Horse), Baltimore: The Plague Ships (Dark Horse)	
2011	Rodin Esquejo	Morning Glories (Shadowline/Image)	
2011	Dave Johnson	Abe Sapien: The Abyssal Plain (Dark Horse), Unknown Soldier (Vertigo/DC), Punisher Max (Marvel), Deadpool (Marvel)	
2011	David Petersen	Mouse Guard: Legends of the Guard (Archaia)	
2011	Yuko Shimizu	The Unwritten (Vertigo/DC)	
2012	Francesco Francavilla	Black Panther (Marvel), The Lone Ranger (Dynamite), Lone Ranger/Zorro (Dynamite), Dark Shadows (Dynamite), Warlord of Mars (Dynamite), Archie Meets Kiss (Archie)	
2012	Michael Allred	iZOMBIE (Vertigo/DC)	
2012	Viktor Kalvachev	Blue Estate (Image)	
2012	Marcos Martín	Daredevil (Marvel), The Amazing Spider-Man (Marvel)	
2012	Sean Phillips	Criminal: The Last of the Innocent (Marvel/Icon)	
2012	Yuko Shimizu	The Unwritten (Vertigo/DC)	
2013	David Aja	Hawkeye (Marvel)	
2013	Brandon Graham	King City (Image), Multiple Warheads (Image), Elephantmen #43 (Image)	
2013	Sean Phillips	Fatale (Image)	
2013	Yuko Shimizu	The Unwritten (Vertigo/DC)	
2013	J. H. Williams III	Batwoman (DC)	
2014	David Aja	Hawkeye (Marvel)	
2014	Mike del Mundo	X-Men: Legacy (Marvel)	
2014	Sean Murphy/Jordie Bellaire	The Wake (DC/Vertigo)	
2014	Emma Ríos	Pretty Deadly (Image)	
2014	Chris Samnee	Daredevil (Marvel)	
2014	Fiona Staples	Saga (Image)	
2015	Darwyn Cooke	DC Comics Darwyn Cooke Month Variant Covers (DC)	
2015	Mike del Mundo	Elektra (Marvel), X-Men: Legacy (Marvel), A+X (Marvel), Dexter (Marvel), Dexter Down Under (Marvel)	
2015	Francesco Francavilla	Afterlife with Archie (Archie), Grindhouse: Doors Open at Midnight (Dark Horse), The Twilight Zone (Dynamite), Django/Zorro (Dynamite); X-Files (IDW)	
2015	Jamie McKelvie/Matthew Wilson	The Wicked + The Divine (Image), Ms. Marvel (Marvel)	
2015	Phil Noto	Black Widow (Marvel)	
2015	Alex Ross	Astro City (Vertigo/DC), Batman '66: The Lost Episode, Batman '66 Meets Green Hornet (DC/Dynamite)	
2016	David Aja	Hawkeye (Marvel), Karnak (Marvel), Scarlet Witch (Marvel)	
2016	Rafael Alburquerque	EI8ht (Dark Horse), Huck (Image)	
2016	Amanda Conner	Harley Quinn (DC)	
2016	Joëlle Jones	Lady Killer (Dark Horse), Brides of Helheim (Oni)	
2016	Ed Piskor	Hip Hop Family Tree (Fantagraphics)	
2017	Fiona Staples	Saga (Image)	
2017	Mike del Mundo	Avengers (Marvel), Carnage (Marvel), Mosaic (Marvel), The Vision (Marvel)	
2017	David Mack	Abe Sapien (Dark Horse), B.P.R.D. Hell on Earth (Dark Horse), Fight Club 2 (Dark Horse), Hellboy and the BPRD 1953 (Dark Horse)	
2017	Sean Phillips	Criminal 10th Anniversary Special (Image), Kill or Be Killed (Image)	
2017	Sana Takeda	Monstress (Image)	
2018	Sana Takeda	Monstress (Image)	
2018	Jorge Corona	No.1 with a Bullet (Image)	
2018	Nick Derington	Mister Miracle (DC), Doom Patrol (DC/Young Animal)	
2018	Brian Stelfreeze	Black Panther (Marvel)	
2018	Julian Totino Tedesco	Hawkeye (Marvel)	
2019	Jen Bartel	Blackbird (Image), Submerged (Vault)	
2019	Nick Derington	Mister Miracle (DC)	
2019	Karl Kerschl	Isola (Image)	
2019	Joshua Middleton	Batgirl variants (DC), Aquaman variants (DC)	
2019	Julian Totino Tedesco	Hawkeye (Marvel), Life of Captain Marvel (Marvel)	
2020s
2020	Emma Ríos	Pretty Deadly (Image)	
2020	Jen Bartel	Blackbird (Image)	
2020	Francesco Francavilla	Archie (Archie), Archie 1955 (Archie), Archie vs. Predator II (Archie), Cosmo (Archie)	
2020	David Mack	American Gods (Dark Horse), Fight Club 3 (Dark Horse), Cover (DC)	
2020	Julian Totino Tedesco	Daredevil (Marvel)	
2020	Christian Ward	Machine Gun Wizards (Dark Horse), Invisible Kingdom (Berger Books/Dark Horse)	
2021	Peach Momoko	Buffy the Vampire Slayer #19 (Boom! Studios), Mighty Morphin #2 (Boom! Studios), Something Is Killing the Children #12 (Boom! Studios), Power Rangers #1 (Boom! Studios); Die!namite (Dynamite Entertainment); The Crow: Lethe (IDW Publishing); Marvel Variants (Marvel Comics)	
2021	Jamal Campbell	Mighty Morphin Power Rangers (Boom! Studios); Far Sector (DC Comics)	
2021	Simone Di Meo	We Only Find Them When They’re Dead (Boom! Studios)	
2021	Mike Huddleston	Decorum (Image Comics)	
2021	Dave Johnson	Butcher of Paris (Dark Horse Comics)	
2021	Ramón K. Pérez	Stillwater (Image Comics/Skybound Entertainment)	
2022	Jen Bartel	Future State Immortal Wonder Woman #1&2 (DC), Wonder Woman Black & Gold #1 (DC), Wonder Woman 80th Anniversary (DC), Women’s History Month variant covers (Marvel Comics)	
2022	David Mack	Norse Mythology (Dark Horse Comics)	
2022	Bruno Redondo	Nightwing (DC Comics)	
2022	Alex Ross	Black Panther, Captain America, Captain America/Iron Man #2, Immortal Hulk, Iron Man, The U.S. of The Marvels (Marvel Comics)	
2022	Julian Totino Tedesco	Just Beyond: Monstrosity (Boom! Studios/KaBoom!); Dune: House Atreides (Boom! Studios); Action Comics (DC Comics); The Walking Dead Deluxe (Image Skybound)	
2022	Yoshi Yoshitani	I Am Not Starfire (DC Comics); The Blue Flame, Giga, Witchblood (Vault Comics)	
2023	Bruno Redondo	Nightwing (DC)	
2023	Jen Bartel	She-Hulk (Marvel)	
2023	Alex Ross	Astro City: That Was Then... Image, Fantastic Four, Black Panther (Marvel)	
2023	Sana Takeda	Monstress (Image)	
2023	Zoe Thorogood	Joe's Hill's Rain (Syzygy/Image)	
2024	Peach Momoko	Demon Wars: Scarlet Sin (Marvel)	
2024	Jen Bartel	DC Pride 2023, Fire & Ice: Welcome to Smallville #1 (DC); Captain Marvel: Dark Tempest #1, Demon Wars: Scarlet Sin #1, Scarlet Witch #9, Sensational She-Hulk (Marvel)	
2024	Evan Cagle	Detective Comics (DC)	
2024	Jenny Frison	Alice Never After #1, BRZRKR: Fallen Empire #1 (BOOM! Studios); Knight Terrors: Harley Quinn #1–2, Poison Ivy #8, #12 (DC)	
2024	E. M. Gist	Expanse Dragon Tooth #1, Something Is Killing the Children #28 & #34, Wild’s End, vol 2 #4 (BOOM! Studios); Amazing Spider-Man #23, Doctor Aphra #36, Moon Knight #3, Nightcrawlers #1, Wolverine #38 (Marvel)	
2024	Dan Mora	Coda #3, Damn Them All #4, MMPR 30th Anniversary Special #1, Rare Flavours #3 (BOOM! Studios); Batman/Superman: World’s Finest, Outsiders #1, Poison Ivy #9, Shazam!, Titans #1 (DC)	
2025	Tula Lotay	Helen of Wyndhorn #1, Count Crowley: Mediocre Midnight Monster Hunter #3, Dawnrunner #1, Barnstormers TPB (Dark Horse); Somna and other titles (DSTLRY); The Horizon Experiment (Image)	
2025	Juni Ba	The Boy Wonder (DC); Godzilla Skate or Die, TMNT Nightwatcher and others (IDW)	
2025	Evan Cagle	Dawnrunner (Dark Horse); New Gods (Detective Comics)	
2025	Bilquis Evely	Animal Pound (BOOM!); Helen of Wyndhorn (Dark Horse)	
2025	Hayman Sherman	Absolute Wonder Woman, Batman: Dark Patterns, Superman, Ape-ril, Batman: The Brave and the Bold (DC)	
2026	Javier Rodriguez	Absolute Martian Manhunter, Batman & Robin: Year One #7, The New Gods #8 (DC)	
2026	Juni Ba	The Boy Wonder (DC); The Fable of Erkling Woods (Goats Flying Press); TMNT Nightwatcher, TMNT Godzilla (IDW); Monkey Meat Summer Batch (Image)	
2026	Nick Dragotta	Absolute Batman, Absolute Batman 2025 Annual, Batman #1, Batman/Deadpool (DC)	
2026	Francesco Francavilla	Cyberpunk 2077, Star Wars: Tales from the Nightlands (Dark Horse); Absolute Batman, Absolute Martian Manhunter, Batman: Full Moon, Nightwing variants (DC); Green Hornet/Miss Fury (Dynamite); Star Trek: The Last Starship, Twilight Zone (IDW); Dick Tracy (Mad Cave)	
2026	Mateus Manhanini	Absolute Superman, Absolute Wonder Woman, Mr. Terrific: Year One variants (DC); Doctor Strange, Ironheart: Bad Chemistry, Miles Morales: Spider-Man, Phases of the Moon Knight, Star Wars: The High Republic, Storm, The Ultimates (Marvel)	
2026	Hayden Sherman	Absolute Wonder Woman, Batman: Dark Patterns #3-12 (DC)	

== Multiple awards and nominations ==
The following individuals have won Best Cover Artist one or more times:

Cover Artist	Wins	Nominations
James Jean	6	6
Brian Bolland	5	5
Alex Ross	4	8
David Aja	3	3
Jen Bartel	2	3
Dave Johnson	1	7
Glenn Fabry	1	6
J.H. Williams III	1	3
Francesco Francavilla	1	3
Mike Mignola	1	2
Fiona Staples	1	2
Sana Takeda	1	2
Emma Ríos	1	2
Darwyn Cooke	1	1
Adam Hughes	1	1

The following individuals have received two or more nominations but never won Best Cover Artist:

Cover Artist	Nominations
Sean Phillips	5
Tony Harris	4
John Cassaday	4
Julian Totino Tedesco	4
Dave McKean	3
Steve Rude	3
J. G. Jones	3
Yuko Shimizu	3
Mike del Mundo	3
David Mack	3
Simon Bisley	2
Brendan McCarthy	2
Dave Sim/Gerhard	2
Matt Wagner	2
Terry Moore	2
Charles Vess	2
Chris Ware	2
Jerry Ordway	2
Jae Lee	2
Nick Derington	2

== See also ==
- Eisner Award for Best Publication for Early Readers
- Eisner Award for Best Academic/Scholarly Work
- Eisner Award for Best Writer
- Eisner Award for Best Coloring
- Eisner Award for Best Lettering
