= List of Legendary Television programs =

This is a list of television shows produced or distributed by Legendary Television, a division of Legendary Entertainment.

== Filmography ==
=== Television series ===
Year	Title	Network	Co-production company(s)	Ref.
2015–2022	The Expanse	Syfy (2015–18); Amazon Prime Video (2019–22)	Distribution only; Penguin in a Parka / SeanDanielCo (2015–18) / Alcon Television Group / Just So (2019–22) / Hivemind (2019–22) / Amazon Studios (2019–22)	
2016–2018	Colony	USA Network	Carlton Cuse Productions (2016) / Cuse Productions (2017) / Genre Arts (2018) / Universal Cable Productions	
2016–2018	Love	Netflix	Apatow Productions / Don't Ask Arfin / Rust's Western Shed	
2016	Electra Woman and Dyna Girl (Note: Legendary Digital Media was the production company on this series.)	Fullscreen	Fullscreen / Sid & Marty Krofft Pictures	
2016–2018	Raising Expectations	Family Channel	Distribution only; Aircraft Pictures / Dolphin Entertainment	
2017	Downward Dog	ABC	Mosaic Media Group / Animal Media Group / ABC Studios	
2018	The Looming Tower	Hulu	Wolf Moon Productions / South Slope Pictures / Jigsaw Productions; Also distribution	
2018–2021	Lost in Space	Netflix	Sazama Sharpless Productions / Applebox Entertainment / Synthesis Entertainment / Clickety-Clack Productions	
2019–2023	Carnival Row	Amazon Prime Video	Siesta Productions (2019) / CrimeThink (2023) / Amazon Studios	
2021	Debris	NBC	Frequency Films / Universal Television	
2021–2022	Pacific Rim: The Black	Netflix	Greg Johnson Productions / Lemon Scented Ninja	
2022	Vanda	Hulu	La Panda / SPi	
2022	Night Sky	Amazon Prime Video	Mosaic / Sunshine Park Productions / Amazon Studios	
2022	Paper Girls	Amazon Prime Video	Future Investigations / Sorry Dave Productions / Sic Semper Tyrannis / Plan B Entertainment / Amazon Studios	
2023–present	Drops of God	Apple TV+	Les Productions Dynamic / Adline Entertainment / 22h22	
2023	You Would Do It Too	Disney+	ESPotlight	
2023	Skull Island	Netflix	Powerhouse Animation / JP	
2023–present	Monarch: Legacy of Monsters	Apple TV	Safehouse Pictures / Toho Co., Ltd. / Milkfed Criminal Masterminds / Chris Black Broadcasting System	
2024–2025	Tomb Raider: The Legend of Lara Croft	Netflix	Netflix Animation Studios / Crystal Dynamics / DJ2 Entertainment / Powerhouse Animation / Panda Burrow	
2024–present	Dune: Prophecy	HBO	Wandering Jew Productions / Herbert Properties, Inc. / Flying Life / Warner Bros. Television	

=== Television films ===
Year	Title	Network	Co-production company(s)	Ref.
2020	Console Wars	Paramount+	CBS Television Studios / Point Grey Pictures	

== Upcoming shows ==
=== Undated ===
Title	Network	Year	Notes
Criminal	Amazon Prime Video	2027	Based on the comic book series of the same name created by Ed Brubaker and Sean Phillips. Co-production with Amazon MGM Studios
Emily the Criminal	TBA	TBA	Based on the 2022 film of the same name by John Patton Ford. Co-production with Low Spark Films and Fear Knot Productions.
How to Become the Dark Lord (and Die Trying)	TBA	TBA	Based on the novel of the same name by Django Wexler
Untitled Land of the Lost reboot	Netflix	TBA	Co-production with Sid and Marty Krofft Productions
Untitled Magic: The Gathering series	TBA	TBA	Based on the collectible card game of same name by Wizard of the Coast. Co-production with Hasbro Entertainment§
Untitled Pacific Rim prequel series	Amazon Prime Video	TBA	Based on the film franchise of the same name. Co-production with Chronology.
Seveneves	TBA	TBA	Based on the novel of the same name by Neal Stephenson.
Tomb Raider	Amazon Prime Video	TBA	Based on the video game franchise of the same name. Co-production with Crystal Dynamics, dj2 Entertainment, Wells Street Productions and Amazon MGM Studios.

== Passed projects ==
Title	Network	Year	Notes
Poor Richard's Almanack	USA Network	2016	Co-produced with Universal Cable Productions
Untitled Matt Fogel & Todd Strauss-Schulson comedy	TBS	2016	Co-produced with Red Hour Films and Ulterior Productions
