= The Fade Out =

Crime comic

- Cover to The Fade Out #1, art by Sean Phillips

Publication information
- Publisher: Image Comics
- Schedule: Monthly
- Format: Ongoing series
- Genre: Crime
- Publication date: August 2014 – January 2016
- No. of issues: 12

Creative team
- Written by: Ed Brubaker
- Artist: Sean Phillips
- Colorist: Elizabeth Breitweiser

Collected editions
- Act One (#1–4): ISBN 1632151715
- Act Two (#5–8): ISBN 1632154471
- Act Three (#9–12): ISBN 1632156296
- Hardcover: ISBN 1632159112

The Fade Out is a crime comics series created by writer Ed Brubaker and artist Sean Phillips with the help of colorist Elizabeth Breitweiser and research assistant Amy Condit. Twelve issues were published by Image Comics between August 2014 and January 2016. The story has been collected into three trade paperback volumes and a single hardcover collection.

The story, partly inspired by the life of Brubaker's uncle John Paxton, is set in 1948 and stars Charlie Parish, a Hollywood screenwriter suffering from post-traumatic stress disorder (PTSD) and fronting for his blacklisted best friend, Gil. When Charlie wakes from a blackout in the same room as a murdered starlet, he and Gil set out to bring her killer to justice. As they learn more about her troubled past, they find themselves up against powerful Hollywood elites who do not want to upset the status quo.

Although Brubaker had been concerned the premise was not commercial enough to have wide appeal, The Fade Out sold better than any of the authors' previous collaborations, and early issues went through several printings. The series received positive reviews from critics.

== Publication history ==
=== Development ===
Ed Brubaker's uncle, John Paxton, was a noted Hollywood screenwriter in the 1930s and 1940s known for Murder, My Sweet, Crossfire, The Wild One and On the Beach. His wife, Sarah Jane Paxton, worked public relations for 20th Century Fox at the same time. They told Brubaker stories about their experiences, and he developed a lifelong fascination with the time and setting. In particular, he was drawn to the false personas he felt everyone had to put forward to succeed.

In mid-2014, having just finished their previous collaboration, Fatale, Brubaker and artist Sean Phillips were deliberating whether their next project would be a noir period piece or a science fiction tale. Brubaker did not think a noir set in 1940s Hollywood was commercial enough to be accepted through normal channels, but the timing aligned with their five-year exclusive contract with Image Comics. This contract guaranteed the creators could publish any comic without having to pitch it to the publisher first. The pair announced The Fade Out and their new contract on January 9, 2014, at Image Expo. At the time, no length was given for the series because they were not sure how many issues were needed to tell the story. Since Fatale had taken twice as long as originally planned, they did not want to mislead fans or feel pressure to conclude before they were ready. They did know it would be a minimum of 12 issues.

When they were asked for a promotional image for use at Image Expo, Brubaker suggested "a typewriter and some blood and a dead body's hands". Phillips removed the hands and incorporated the blood into the logo. After completing the image, he thought the stark white background would help the book stand out on sales racks and continued to use it for subsequent covers.

While the central plot is a murder mystery, the initial idea was of a writer with PTSD who cannot write and is instead fronting for his blacklisted best friend. Throughout the series, Brubaker switched between first- and third-person narration because it allowed him to tell a broader story. He was also trying to create a layered story which would reward repeated reading, so he avoided extraneous details. When writing the scripts, Brubaker listened to music from the 1940s to stay in the right frame of mind.

Phillips, who lives in the United Kingdom, sometimes has difficulty accurately portraying modern America and said "1948 Hollywood might as well be sci-fi". Since there was not enough time for him to do his own research and maintain a monthly schedule, Brubaker hired Amy Condit as a research assistant. Condit, who is the manager of the Los Angeles Police Museum, supplied Phillips with thousands of reference photos. Phillips also bought some DVDs he thought might be useful, but never found time to watch them.

Although Phillips has been using digital tools like Cintiq and Manga Studio to create his art since 1997, The Fade Out is his first project completed using them exclusively. The change increased the amount of time needed to create each page by almost 50 percent, but had no effect on colorist Elizabeth Breitweiser. Visually, Phillips' style remained the same as his previous work, which critic Charley Parked notes for its "strong spotted blacks and bold use of negative space". Phillips also changed his regular lettering font to one more "sympathetic to the period". During publication, he chose to remain in the dark about where the story was going, sometimes receiving only a few pages of the script at a time.

=== Publication ===
The 40-page first issue was released in print and digitally on August 20, 2014. Jamie McKelvie and Chip Zdarsky provided art for two retailer-exclusive variant covers. These variants were commissioned directly by the retailers. Unlike most comics sold in the direct market, unsold copies of this issue could be returned to the publisher. This tactic allowed retailers to place higher orders without taking a financial risk. Estimated sales were just under 35,000 copies, making it the 61st best-selling comic book for the month. Due to re-orders, the issue sold out at the distributor level on the day of release. A second printing was announced the next day and was released on September 24, 2014, the same day as issue two. Including sales for the second printing, the first issue sold approximately 41,000 copies. In addition to the standard print version, a larger "magazine" version with eight additional pages of art was available for an extra cost. This version, which was not returnable, was estimated to have sold an additional 8300 copies. All told, The Fade Out #1 had better sales than anything Brubaker and Phillips had previously done together. Brubaker suspects the numbers were higher partly because they had developed a following, and partly because retailers had become more supportive of Image books in general.

The second issue also went through a second printing, which was released the same day as issue three. Its total sales were estimated to be around 30,500.

In addition to the regular 22 pages of story, each issue included extra material. Because the opening credit page was a two-page splash across the inside front cover and page one, an additional page needed to be inserted to make the story start on the recto side of the page. Brubaker's solution was to use page two as a cast list with short descriptions that updated as the story progressed, which he felt was "old-fashioned and neat". Jess Nevins and Devin Faraci, among others, contributed essays and articles at the end of each issue about crime and misfortune among actors famous in the 1940s. The back cover of each issue included promotional images or reviews for the fictional movie being filmed in the comic. These typically foreshadowed future events or expanded on minor characters.

In September 2015, Image's solicitations for upcoming comics revealed The Fade Out would end with issue twelve, which was released on January 6, 2016. Like the first issue, it had twice as many pages as a standard comic book. It sold an estimated 16,500 copies and was the 136th-best selling issue of the month. Brubaker has said The Fade Out was, at the time, his most complex story and it ended "exactly the way [he had] pictured it in the beginning". The creators had already begun work on their next collaboration, Kill or Be Killed, before the final issue of The Fade Out had been published. The series was collected into three trade paperback volumes during publication and one oversized hardcover in October 2016. The articles and essays found in the single issues are not included in the collections.

In the letter column of Kill or Be Killed #12 (September 2017), Brubaker mentioned plans for a semi-sequel to The Fade Out. He said that if made, the comic book would share the setting and some of the supporting characters, but the plot would be unrelated.

== Plot ==
Charlie Parish, a Hollywood screenwriter suffering from PTSD, is fronting for his blacklisted best friend, Gil. When Charlie wakes from a blackout in the same room as a murdered starlet, he and Gil set out to bring her killer to justice. As they follow leads trying to piece together the night leading up to the murder, cooperative witnesses are punished by the studio's fixer. Charlie is prepared to quit when Gil tries to blackmail the head of the studio by anonymously claiming he "knows what happened" with the starlet. Misunderstanding the threat, the studio head tries to destroy evidence that he had sexually abused her when she was a child actor. Charlie and Gil are able to retrieve a folder of photographs and decide to keep fighting for justice. They plan to kidnap the other studio co-founder, who is now suffering from Alzheimer's disease and will freely admit to the past sins. They arrive at the co-founder's mansion at the same time the fixers are murdering him to prevent him from talking. As the two friends are escaping from the fixers, Gil is shot and killed. When Charlie resigns himself to working in the corrupt culture, the fixer reveals the actress was murdered by an undercover FBI agent who was looking for communists in Hollywood.

== Reception ==
An interior panel from The Fade Out drawn by Sean Phillips and colored by Elizabeth Breitweiser showing the use of a period-appropriate font, color splotches, and shadows.

Critics gave the series positive reviews. According to the review aggregator Comic Book Roundup, the first issue scored an average 9.2/10 based on 41 reviews, the series as a whole averaged 8.9/10 based on 154 reviews, and the final issue averaged 9.6/10 based on 9 reviews. The series won the 2016 Eisner Award for "Best Limited Series".

Sam Marx, writing for Comicosity, called The Fade Out the creators' "most ambitious series yet" and praised their ability to set a scene. Reviewing for Comic Book Resources, Greg McElhatton gave Brubaker credit for avoiding excessive exposition at the start of the story, but felt some of the characters seemed stereotypical. The first issue was placed on the Entertainment Weekly "Must List". Chase Magnett of Comics Bulletin described the ending as "an anti-climax with no big showdown, revelations, or death", but went on to say the "sense of disappointment is exactly why it's great". McElhatton agreed, saying a happy ending would have "felt like a cheat", but the "central mystery [is given] a proper amount of closure".

Phillips' art was commended by McElhatton, who appreciated the variety of body types in crowd scenes and the strong use of body language to convey emotion. Jim Bush at Entertainment Fuse usually liked Phillips' work, but felt the sex scenes in issue seven did not play to the artist's strengths. Mary Kate Jasper, a reviewer for Comic Book Resources, noted how colorist Elizabeth Breitweiser enhanced Phillips' work with "splotches of color in unexpected arrangements, giving everyone the appearance of being forever in shadow or inside with the windows drawn". She particularly liked how Breitweiser made characters' eyes appear to glisten and stand out in otherwise dark panels.

== Collected editions ==
Title	Issues collected	Pages	Format	Publisher	Released	ISBN
The Fade Out: Act One	The Fade Out #1-4	120	TPB	Image	25 Feb 2015	978-1632151711
The Fade Out: Act Two	The Fade Out #5-8	112	TPB	Image	29 Sep 2015	978-1632154477
The Fade Out: Act Three	The Fade Out #9-12	128	TPB	Image	23 Feb 2016	978-1632156297
The Fade Out: The Complete Collection	The Fade Out #1-12	360	TPB	Image	20 Nov 2018	978-1534308602
The Fade Out: The Deluxe Edition	The Fade Out #1-12	384	OHC	Image	18 Oct 2016	978-1632159113

== In other media ==
Brubaker received calls from interested parties in Hollywood about adapting The Fade Out very early in its publication. However, he did not want to sell the rights until the series was finished. He had done so with a previous work, and it affected the way he wrote it because he was imagining it in the other medium.

== See also ==
- Criminal
- Fatale
- Incognito
- Kill Or Be Killed
- Sleeper
