= Daniel Casey (screenwriter) =

American screenwriter

- Born: November 15, 1981 (age 44); Dallas, Texas, U.S.
- Education: College for Creative Studies (BFA); American Film Institute (MFA)
- Occupation: Screenwriter
- Writing career
- Years active: 1999–present
- Notable works: The Death of Michael Smith; Kin; F9

Daniel Casey (born November 15, 1981) is an American screenwriter best known as the writer of the 2018 film Kin and the 2021 installment in the Fast & Furious franchise, F9.

== Early life ==
Casey grew up in Detroit, Michigan. He graduated from George A. Dondero High School before attending the College for Creative Studies in Detroit, Michigan where he earned his BFA in digital cinema and received his MFA in Film Directing from the American Film Institute, where he was the recipient of the Tom Yoda Scholarship Award. Casey with his film Poletown was selected as one of 13 projects to participate in the annual Sundance Institute's June Directors and Screenwriters Labs, held at the Sundance Resort in Utah.

== Career ==
Casey replaced Chris Morgan in writing the screenplay for the latest installment in the Fast & Furious franchise, F9, which was released on June 25, 2021.

He has been selected to work on Sony's adaptation of the comic, Incognito, by Ed Brubaker. Fede Álvarez is set to direct.

He is also attached to another comic book adaptation for the big screen from Brubaker, Kill or Be Killed. It will be directed by Chad Stahelski.

J. J. Abrams' Bad Robot is producing Casey's script The Heavy for Paramount. The superhero movie is in negotiations with Overlord director Julius Avery to direct.

Blumhouse Productions is rumored to be remaking The Craft. Casey is tied to the project with fellow writer Zoe Lister-Jones. Lister-Jones has also been rumored to direct.

In July 2021, Casey was announced to have been selected by the Russo brothers to write the script for the movie adaptation of the popular anime Battle of the Planets.

In November 2024, it was reported that Casey would write and executive produce a TV series adaptation of the Mass Effect video game franchise for Amazon MGM Studios.

== Personal life ==
Casey currently resides in Los Angeles, California.

== Filmography ==
=== Film ===
| Year | Title | Director | Writer | Producer | Editor | Notes |
|---|---|---|---|---|---|---|
| 2003 | The Passage | Yes | Yes | Yes | Yes | |
| 2003 | Secrets of Fenville | Yes | Yes | No | Yes | segment "Happily Married Vigilantes" |
| 2006 | The Death of Michael Smith | Yes | Yes | Yes | Yes | |
| 2008 | Dead Man's Hour | No | Yes | No | No | |
| 2016 | 10 Cloverfield Lane | No | uncredited | No | No | |
| 2018 | Kin | No | Yes | No | No | |
| 2021 | F9 | No | Yes | No | No | |
| 2026 | Wardriver | No | Yes | Yes | No | |

Special Thanks

- Deadheads (2011)

=== Television ===
Writer

- Dr0ne (2012) (1 episode)

Editor

- Chosen (2013) (6 episodes)

== Awards and nominations ==
| Year | Award | Category | Nominated work | Result |
|---|---|---|---|---|
| 2004 | B-Movie Film Festival | Best Writer | The Passage | Won |
| 2004 | B-Movie Film Festival | Best B-Movie | The Passage | Nominated |
| 2004 | Tambay Film and Video Festival | New Filmmaker Award | The Passage | Won |
| 2007 | Slamdance Film Festival | Grand Jury Prize for Excellence | The Death of Michael Smith | Won |
| 2007 | Silver Lake Film Festival | Best Narrative Feature Award | The Death of Michael Smith | Won |
