= Myles Truitt =

American actor (born 2002)

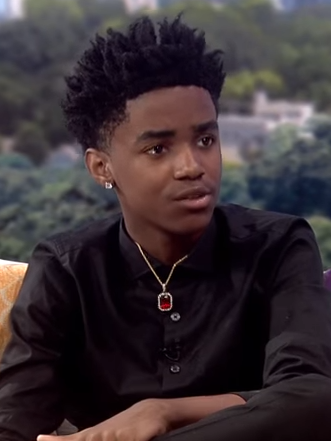
- Truitt in 2018
- Born: February 1, 2002 (age 24); Atlanta, Georgia, U.S.
- Occupation: Actor
- Years active: 2017-present

Myles Truitt (born February 1, 2002) is an American actor best known for his breakout role as Eli Solinski in Kin. He also plays Ant in Queen Sugar and Issa Williams on Black Lightning.

== Biography ==
Myles Truitt became interested in acting at the age of 11. He made his debut as young Ronnie DeVoe in The New Edition Story. He continued acting in minor roles on television until he made his big screen debut in Kin. Truitt felt the role was personal to him stating, "Before I saw the script, I saw the short film...and knowing the story behind it, and how Eli created himself, I knew I wanted the role because I connected with Eli." He appeared on Atlanta as Devin, a boy who experiences bullying. He won the role of Ant on Queen Sugar and appeared in Black Lightning as Issa Williams. Truitt was unfamiliar with the comic book character, but became interested upon appearing in the series.

== Filmography ==
Year	Title	Role	Notes
2017	The New Edition Story	Young Ronnie DeVoe	Miniseries
2017	Superstition	Arlo Hastings	2 episodes
2018	Jay	Malik	Short film
2018	Atlanta	Devin	Episode: "FUBU"
2018	Kin	Eli Solinski	
2018	Dragged Across Concrete	Ethan Johns	
2018–2019	Queen Sugar	Ant	Recurring role (season 3); guest role (season 4)
2018–2019	Black Lightning	Issa Williams	Recurring role (season 2); guest (season 3)
2021–2023, 2025	BMF	B-Mickie	Main role (season 1–2, 4)
2022	Stranger Things	Patrick McKinney	Recurring role (season 4)
2025	Give Me Back My Daughter	Curtis	
2025	A Soulful Christmas	Robert Franklin	BET+ Original Film
2026	Paper Made	Tavon Watkins	
