= Incognito (comics) =

Comic book limited series

- Cover of Incognito #1 (December 2008), art by Sean Phillips.

Publication information
- Publisher: Icon Comics (imprint of Marvel Comics)
- Schedule: Monthly
- Format: Limited series
- Genre: Crime, superhero
- Publication date: December 2008
- No. of issues: 6 (first series); 5 (second series)

Creative team
- Written by: Ed Brubaker
- Artist: Sean Phillips
- Colorist: Val Staples

Incognito is a six-issue comic book limited series written by Ed Brubaker with art by Sean Phillips. It was originally published by the Icon Comics imprint of Marvel Comics.

A second five-issue miniseries, Incognito: Bad Influences, was released in late 2010.

The first series ran for six issues starting in December 2008, with a seven-month hiatus while the creators worked on another volume. It returned in November 2010 for five more issues. Each issue featured an article written by Jess Nevins on various pulp characters. The comic is set in a world where pulp science heroes and villains have existed since the early 19th century. The protagonist, Zack Overkill, is a former science villain in the Witness Protection Program who regains his super abilities through illegal drugs. He becomes a vigilante and faces threats from his past. In the second series, Zack becomes an agent for the SOS agency and goes undercover to bring back an infiltrated agent. The comic was collected into editions, and in 2017, a republished version was released by Image Comics.

== Publication history ==
The first series was published in December 2008 and ran for six issues. The title took a seven-month hiatus while the creators worked on the third volume of Criminal. It returned in November 2010 and ran for another five issues.

Each issue featured an article written by Jess Nevins on the pulp characters The Shadow (#1), Doc Savage (#2), The Spider (#3), Operator No. 5 (#4), Fu Manchu (#5), and Zeppelin Pulps (#6). The articles in the second miniseries focused on The Phantom Detective (#1), G-8 (#2), Captain Future (#3), Nick Carter (#4), and Pulp Supervillains (#5).

== Plot ==
The comic is set in a world in which larger-than-life pulp science heroes and villains have existed since the early 19th century. The original super was an escaped convict named Kenneth Lee who became Black Death. His powers came from a radioactive object which landed in New England over 200 years ago. Other notable supers include the descendants of the soldiers who were chasing him including the Doc Savage-esque "Professor Zeppelin" and the Shadow-esque "Lazarus". After World War II, the SOS agency created by Zeppelin has kept most stories about the supers out of the news, portraying them as freak weather events.

The comic deals with former science villain Zack Overkill, who is in the Witness Protection Program after giving testimony against Black Death. Zack is required to take a drug that eliminates his super abilities and delivers mail in an office.

To escape the boredom of a normal life, Zack experiments with illegal drugs. He discovers that they interfere with the power-blocking drug and he once again has his super strength. He begins wearing a mask again and searches for action in the streets and back alleys, acting as a vigilante rather than a supervillain. His actions reveal to Black Death that he is alive; several of Black Death's soldiers attempt to kill Zack for his testimony.

During the story, Zack learns about the origins of heroes and villains, and his own connection to Lazarus. After working with Professor Zeppelin's daughter Zoe, Zack decides to work with SOS to avoid boredom and Black Death's agents.

In the second series, Bad Influences, Zack is now an agent for the SOS, and given a new assignment: appear to go rogue so he can go underground and bring back an SOS agent who infiltrated Level 9, a science-villain organization. But while doing so, someone is using the identity of Lazarus to wipe out science villains. SOS incorrectly believes Zack had gone rogue, and he is imprisoned in the same prison as Black Death.

== Collected editions ==
Title	Issues collected	Pages	Format	Publisher	Released	ISBN
Incognito	Incognito #1-6	176	TPB	Icon	9 Dec 2009	978-0785139799
Incognito: Bad Influences	Incognito: Bad Influences #1-5	144	TPB	Icon	27 Jul 2011	978-0785151555
Incognito: The Classified Edition	Incognito #1-6; Incognito: Bad Influences #1-5	336	OHC	Icon	5 Sep 2012	978-0785165743
Incognito: The Classified Edition	Incognito #1-6; Incognito: Bad Influences #1-5	368	OHC	Image	12 Sep 2017	978-1534305427

== Film adaptation ==
Incognito was optioned for a film by 20th Century Fox, with Robert Schenkkan penciled in as the screenwriter. The film was picked up by Columbia Pictures, with 10 Cloverfield Lane screenwriter Daniel Casey writing the script and Fede Álvarez directing.

== See also ==
- Criminal
- The Fade Out
- Fatale
- Kill Or Be Killed
- Sleeper
