= Criminal (TV series) =

Upcoming American crime drama television miniseries

- Genre: Crime drama
- Created by: Ed Brubaker
- Based on: Criminal by: Ed Brubaker; Sean Phillips
- Showrunners: Ed Brubaker; Jordan Harper
- Starring: Charlie Hunnam; Adria Arjona; Luke Evans; Emilia Clarke
- Country of origin: United States
- Original language: English

Production
- Executive producers: Ed Brubaker; Sean Phillips; Phillip A. Barnett; Anna Boden Ryan Fleck; Jordan Harper; Sarah Carbiener; Dee Rees; Halley Gross
- Production companies: Amazon MGM Studios; Basement Gang; Big Indie Pictures; Gowanus Projections; Legendary Television

Original release
- Network: Amazon Prime Video

Criminal is an upcoming American crime drama television miniseries created by Ed Brubaker, based on the creator-owned comic book series of the same name by Brubaker and Sean Phillips. It is scheduled to be released on Amazon Prime Video in two parts. The first part, Coward will debut on January 13, 2027 and followed by the second part, Lawless two weeks later.

== Premise ==
The series follows multiple generations of criminal families and explores the murders that connect their pasts.

== Cast ==
=== Main ===
- Charlie Hunnam as Leo Patterson, a criminal mastermind who plans his jobs using no guns or violence, unlike his father Tommy.
- Adria Arjona as Greta, a driver and car thief who can't get away from the criminal life even after being widowed on a job; she is the mother of Angie.
- Luke Evans as Tracy Lawless, a notorious former criminal pushed into the military to avoid prison who eventually joins the Army Special Forces.
- Emilia Clarke as Mallory, an armed robber in a crew and relationship with Ricky Lawless.
- Gus Halper as Ricky Lawless, an unstable drug-using criminal who grew up with Leo and is the son of feared criminal Teeg Lawless
- Richard Jenkins as Ivan, a former robber now suffering from dementia; he is best friends with Leo's dad.
- Kadeem Hardison as Gnarly, a former boxer and a friend of Leo and Ivan.
- John Hawkes as Sebastian Hyde, a shark in the crime world recovering from a recent stroke
- Logan Browning as Jenny, an Internal Affairs detective who was raised with Leo.

=== Recurring ===
- Michael Mando as Jeff, a bad Vice cop who has lost hope in humanity
- Garrett Hedlund
- Patrick J. Adams
- Pat Healy as Seymour, a thief who worked with Leo's dad at one time
- Taylor Selé as Royal, the manager of Sebastian Hyde's gambling club
- Aliyah Camacho as Angie, Greta's daughter
- Marvin Jones III as Chester, the chief enforcer for Sebastian Hyde
- Michael Xavier as Terry, an armed robber who is good friends with Leo, stepfather to Angie, and Greta's new love
- Dominic Burgess as Delron, a criminal on trial at the mercy of his organization

Additionally, Chris Diamantopoulos, Lawrence Kao, Katie Stevens, John Pyper-Ferguson, Robert Lee Hart, Aina Brei'yon, Kyle Davis, and Cashel Canada are all cast in undisclosed roles.

== Episodes ==
No.	Title	Directed by	Teleplay by	Original release date
Part 1: Coward
1	TBA	Anna Boden and Ryan Fleck	Ed Brubaker	January 13, 2027
2	TBA	Anna Boden and Ryan Fleck	Jordan Harper	January 13, 2027
3	TBA	Anna Boden and Ryan Fleck	Sarah Carbiener	January 13, 2027
4	TBA	Anna Boden and Ryan Fleck	John Covarrubias	January 13, 2027
Part 2: Lawless
5	TBA	Dee Rees	Minhal Baig	January 27, 2027
6	TBA	Dee Rees	Cortney Norris	January 27, 2027
7	TBA	Dee Rees	Sarah Carbiener	January 27, 2027
8	TBA	Dee Rees	Jordan Harper	January 27, 2027

== Production ==
A television adaptation of the comic book series Criminal by Ed Brubaker and Sean Phillips was in initial development at Legendary Television development in 2019 with Brubaker adapting his own work for the screen. In February 2023, Amazon Studios requested further development with Brubaker executive producing with additional writers. Amazon officially ordered the series in January 2024 and Jordan Harper was hired as co-showrunner with Brubaker. In April 2024, Anna Boden and Ryan Fleck were hired to direct the first four episodes. The latter four episodes were directed by Dee Rees.

In May 2024, Richard Jenkins, Adria Arjona, Kadeem Hardison, and Charlie Hunnam were the first cast members announced for the series, In June, Logan Browning was also announced as a series regular, with recurring roles added for Pat Healy, Taylor Selé, John Hawkes, Gus Halper, Aliyah Camacho, Michael Mando, Marvin Jones III, Michael Xavier, and Dominic Burgess. The following month, additional lead roles for Emilia Clarke and Luke Evans were announced.

Filming began in Portland, Oregon, including at the historic Star Theater, on June 10, 2024, with plans to continue through October.

== Marketing ==
In January 2025, Image Comics announced they would reissue trade paperbacks of all previously produced Criminal material. Volumes one and two, Coward and Lawless, were republished with new covers and trade dress on January 22, 2025. These books include comics originally released in 2006 and 2007. Further volumes were due for release on a monthly basis through the rest of the year.

Two new original graphic novels by Brubaker and Philips were released prior to the series premiere: The Knives, released September 9, 2025, and Five Gears In Reverse, released June 23, 2026.

== Release ==
In November 2026, it was announced that Amazon Prime Video will release the series in two parts, which both consists of four episodes. The first part Coward will debut on January 13, 2027, while the second part Lawless will premiere two weeks later.

== Lawsuit ==
In August 2026, ljaaz Noobu, the former production assistant of Criminal, filed a lawsuit against Brubaker for sexual and racial harassment, religious discrimination, assault, and battery in the workplace; Amazon Services, Big Indie Gemini, Inc., and MGM for failing to investigate the incidents; and Phillip Barnett for directing others to avoid documenting complaints.
