= Fatale (Image Comics) =

Supernatural noir comic book by Ed Brubaker and Sean Phillips

- Cover for Issue #1 of Fatale by Sean Phillips.

Publication information
- Publisher: Image Comics
- Schedule: Monthly
- Format: Limited series
- Genre: Crime
- Publication date: January 2012 – July 2014
- No. of issues: 24

Creative team
- Created by: Ed Brubaker; Sean Phillips
- Written by: Ed Brubaker
- Artist: Sean Phillips
- Colorist: David Stewart

Fatale is a supernatural noir comic book created by Ed Brubaker and Sean Phillips. It was published by Image Comics between January 2012 and July 2014. The series was initially announced as a 12-issue limited series, but was later extended to 24 issues.

== Publication history ==
The series was originally announced in the back of the final issue of Brubaker and Phillips' previous collaboration, Criminal: Last of the Innocent. Further details about the series, including its publisher, were revealed at the 2011 New York Comic Con. Brubaker also released a video teaser for the series.

The series began publishing monthly in January 2012. Although initially billed as a twelve-issue series, the length was increased in November. The series concluded after 24 issues.

Several issues featured essays written by Jess Nevins and others on the crime/noir characters, both fictional and real. These were:

- H.P. Lovecraft and the Horror of the Unseen, by Jess Nevins (Issue #1)
- Edgar Allan Poe: Reality as a Grotesque Deception, by Jess Nevins (#2)
- Dan J. Marlowe: Echoes of a Hard-Boiled Past, by Charles Kelly (#3)
- The Real Philip Marlowe, by Stephen Blackmoore (#4)
- Horror and Mystery Fiction Part 1: Ontranto to de Grandin, by Jess Nevins (#6)
- Horror and Mystery Fiction, Part 2: The Weird Menace Pulps, by Jess Nevins (#7)
- The Devil Inside Me: Devil Pulp, by Jess Nevins (#10)
- The Lonely Doll, by Megan Abbott (#12)
- Strange Stories, by Jack Pendarvis (#13)
- Aleister Crowley, by Jess Nevins (#15)
- Cthulhu Lives! On the Afterlife of H.P. Lovecraft, by Jess Nevins (#18)
- Cults in Fiction, by Jess Nevins (#21)
- Leaping the Fence: Fallen Heroes and Redeemed Villains, by Jess Nevins (#24)

== Plot ==
Fatale chronicles the life of Josephine, or "Jo", an archetypal femme fatale who is seemingly immortal, having survived from the 1930s to the modern day unaged, and also has a supernatural ability to hypnotize men into becoming intensely infatuated with her, whether she wants them to be or not.

Through the decades, Jo struggles to understand and control her powers while being pursued by a violent cult. The cult worships cosmic gods reminiscent of Lovecraftian horrors, which are somehow tied to Jo.

During her travels, Jo also encounters many men who quickly become entranced by her, often to fanatical degrees. They become entangled in her escapades, possibly as guardians, collaborators, and lovers. A motif of the series is how these men pay dearly for becoming involved with Jo.

The narrative jumps back and forth between different time periods and points of view, primarily Jo and the men entranced by her. The majority of the action in the first story arc takes place in the 1950s, the second in the 1970s, the third during the 1930s and World War II, while the fourth arc is set in the 1990s.

A couple of issues featured stand-alone stories focused on "fatales" before Jo. Issue #12 tells the story of Mathilda in 13th century France, while Issue #13 tells the story of "Black" Bonnie in the Wild West. Aside from her powers, both women also shared striking physical similarities with Jo and found themselves pursued by the same cult.

== Collected editions ==
Title	Issues collected	Pages	Format	Publisher	Released	ISBN
Fatale Vol. 1: Death Chases Me	Fatale #1-5	144	TPB	Image	10 Jul 2012	978-1607065630
Fatale Vol. 2: The Devil's Business	Fatale #6-10	136	TPB	Image	15 Jan 2013	978-1607066187
Fatale Vol. 3: West of Hell	Fatale #11-14	128	TPB	Image	9 Jul 2013	978-1607067436
Fatale Vol. 4: Pray For Rain	Fatale #15-19	144	TPB	Image	25 Feb 2014	978-1607068358
Fatale Vol. 5: Curse The Demon	Fatale #20-24	144	TPB	Image	7 Oct 2014	978-1632150073
Fatale: Compendium	Fatale #1-24	656	TPB	Image	30 Jul 2024	978-1534327658
Fatale: Compendium (Indigo Canada version)	Fatale #1-24	656	TPB	Image	30 Jul 2024	978-1534337916
Fatale: The Deluxe Edition Vol.1	Fatale #1-10	288	HC	Image	18 Mar 2014	978-1607069423
Fatale: The Deluxe Edition Vol.2	Fatale #11-24	440	HC	Image	24 Nov 2015	978-1632155030

== Critical reception ==
The first issue sold well enough to return to press four times. Reviews for the series were mostly positive with comparisons to the creative team's previous work on Sleeper, Criminal, and Incognito.

Ed Brubaker and Sean Phillips received multiple Eisner Awards nominations for Fatale in 2013: "Best Continuing Series" (Brubaker and Phillips), "Best New Series" (Brubaker and Phillips), "Best Writer" (Brubaker), "Best Penciller/Inker" (Phillips), and "Best Cover Artist" (Phillips).

David Stewart received a 2013 Eisner award for "Best Coloring".

== See also ==
- Criminal
- The Fade Out
- Incognito
- Kill Or Be Killed
- Sleeper
