= Where the Body Was =

Graphic novel by Ed Brubaker and Sean Phillips

Where the Body Was is a standalone graphic novel, created by the duo Ed Brubaker and Sean Phillips. It was published by Image Comics on December 13, 2023. The plot revolves around a murder mystery in the suburbs on the summer of 1984. The story is told from the perspective of multiple characters and jumps back and forth in time.

Brubaker called the story "the strangest and most experimental thing" he and Phillips have made during their collaboration of over 20 years. The plot of the book was inspired by events in Brubaker's life as a teenager in Southern California.

== Critical reception ==
Where the Body Was received positive reviews, earning an average score of 9.7 based on 6 critic reviews at the review aggregation website Comic Book Roundup. Nathan Cabaniss called the book an "ambitious and wide-ranging murder mystery." while Brad Gullickson notes the book "masterfully propels the reader".
