= Kin (film) =

2018 science fiction action film

- Theatrical release poster
- Directed by: Jonathan Baker; Josh Baker
- Screenplay by: Daniel Casey
- Based on: Bag Man by: Jonathan Baker; Josh Baker
- Produced by: Shawn Levy; Dan Cohen; Jeff Arkuss; David Gross; Jesse Shapira
- Starring: Jack Reynor; Zoë Kravitz; Carrie Coon; Dennis Quaid; James Franco; Myles Truitt
- Cinematography: Larkin Seiple
- Edited by: Mark Day
- Music by: Mogwai
- Production companies: No Trace Camping; 21 Laps Entertainment
- Distributed by: Summit Entertainment (through Lionsgate Films; United States); Entertainment One Films (Canada)
- Release date: August 31, 2018
- Running time: 102 minutes
- Countries: United States; Canada
- Language: English
- Budget: $30 million
- Box office: $10.3 million

Kin is a 2018 science fiction action film directed by Jonathan and Josh Baker, and written by Daniel Casey, based on the Bakers' 2014 short film Bag Man. The film stars Jack Reynor, Zoë Kravitz, Carrie Coon, Dennis Quaid, James Franco, and Myles Truitt in his acting debut. The story follows a young boy who finds a strange weapon at the time his newly paroled brother returns.

The film was released in the United States on August 31, 2018, by Summit Entertainment. The film was met with generally negative reviews from critics for its screenwriting and inconsistent tone, though the performances received some praise. The film was a box-office bomb, grossing $10 million worldwide against a budget of $30 million.

== Plot ==
Fourteen-year-old Elijah "Eli" Solinski lives in Detroit with his stern adoptive father Harold "Hal", a widower. While scavenging an abandoned building for copper wiring to sell, Eli discovers the aftermath of a skirmish, with armored corpses and high-tech weaponry strewn about. He picks up a strange weapon, but drops it and flees after it mechanically activates.

That evening, Eli's newly paroled older brother James "Jimmy", Hal's biological son, returns home to his chagrin. Eli dreams of the weapon and sneaks out to retrieve it. Sneaking back in, he overhears the father and son arguing. Jimmy owes $60,000 in protection money to Taylor Balik, a local crime lord, and asks Hal to help him steal the money from his employer. He refuses and kicks Jimmy out.

The next night, Hal catches Jimmy and Taylor breaking into his office safe. Unwilling to walk away prompts Taylor to shoot and kill him. Jimmy accidentally kills Taylor's brother Dutch in the ensuing scuffle before fleeing with the money.

Jimmy convinces Eli that Hal is stuck at a work emergency and wants to meet them at Lake Tahoe. Eli secretly packs the weapon, and they leave moments before Taylor and his gang arrive to ransack the house. Taylor vows to kill Jimmy, as well as Eli, to avenge his own brother's death.

The two brothers bond during the road trip. Jimmy takes Eli into a strip club, where both befriend one of the strippers, Milly. When a drunk Jimmy tries to dance on stage with her, the owner, Lee, leads his men to beat him until Eli brandishes the weapon. Startled, Eli reflexively fires, destroying a pool table. The brothers flee and Milly spontaneously joins them.

Two masked and armored figures detect the weapon's use and follow on motorcycles. Jimmy realizes he left the bag of money at the strip club. Milly leads the brothers to Lee's card game, where they retrieve the money from him at gunpoint.

The trio get a room in a Nevada casino. Milly discusses her past with Eli throughout the journey; she left her abusive parents as a teen and has failed to establish lasting personal relationships. Hal's murder is reported nationally, which Eli sees. Police identify Eli and Jimmy as suspects and apprehend them. Milly watches from a crowd, and Eli signals his approval that she leave them. Jimmy is jailed and Eli rebukes him.

Taylor and his gang overwhelm the county police station, massacring the officers. Before being executed, a wounded officer helps Eli retrieve the weapon from evidence lockup. He kills most of Taylor's men, saving Jimmy.

As Eli and Jimmy prepare to surrender to the FBI, Taylor appears and shoots at Jimmy. The two armored pursuers arrive and freeze time for everyone but Eli and themselves. The figures unmask to reveal that they are a man and woman. The man explains that Eli is actually from their world, which is at war. He was hidden on this world for his safety until he is old enough to help. The man tells Eli to stay with his brother and calls Eli his own brother. The woman redirects Taylor's bullet and the two leave with the weapon.

Time resumes and Taylor is killed by his own bullet. The brothers are taken into custody. Agent Morgan Hunter tells Eli that Jimmy will go to prison, but maybe not for very long if he is cooperative. She tacitly accepts that Jimmy has covered for Eli, who will not discuss the weapon. Milly arrives and waves at Eli.

== Cast ==
- Myles Truitt as Elijah "Eli" Solinski, James's adopted younger brother and Harold's adopted son.
- Jack Reynor as James “Jimmy” Solinski, Elijah’s adoptive brother, Harold's son, and an ex-con.
- Zoë Kravitz as Milly, a stripper looking for an out.
- Carrie Coon as Morgan Hunter, an FBI agent.
- Dennis Quaid as Harold “Hal” Solinski, James and Elijah's father.
- James Franco as Taylor Balik, a crime lord.
- Romano Orzari as Lee Jacobs
- Ian Matthews as Snick
- Michael B. Jordan as the male Cleaner.
- Lily Gao as the female Cleaner.
- Carleigh Beverly as Audrey
- Gavin Fox as Dutch Balik

== Production ==
On August 30, 2016, it was reported that Myles Truitt, Jack Reynor, James Franco, Zoë Kravitz and Dennis Quaid would star in the feature film.

In September 2016, Lionsgate Films bought the rights to Kin in a negative pickup deal for about $30 million at the Toronto International Film Festival after a heated bidding war that also included Universal Pictures, Metro-Goldwyn-Mayer Pictures, Sony Pictures Entertainment, and the Weinstein Company. Filming began on October 24, 2016 in Toronto.

== Music ==
Mogwai composed the score for the film. The soundtrack was released on August 31 by Temporary Residence Limited in the United States and Rock Action Records in the United Kingdom and Europe. Two tracks, "Donuts" and "We're Not Done (End Title)", were released ahead of the album.

== Release ==
The film was released in the United States by Lionsgate on August 31, 2018.

=== Box office ===
Kin grossed $5.7 million in the United States and Canada, and $4.6 million in other territories, for a total worldwide gross of $10.3 million.

In the United States and Canada, Kin was released alongside the wide expansion of Searching and was projected to gross $5–7 million from 2,141 theaters in its four-day opening weekend. It ended up debuting to just $3.1 million, including a four-day Labor Day weekend total of $3.9 million, and finished 11th at the box office. The film dropped 73.5% in its second weekend to $804,401, one of the largest sophomore declines ever, and finished in 17th place.

=== Critical response ===
On the review aggregation website Rotten Tomatoes, the film holds an approval rating of 36%, based on 94 reviews, with an average rating of 5/10. The site's critical consensus reads, "Part family drama, part sci-fi adventure, Kin struggles to balance its narrative until a late twist that suggests it all might have worked better as the first episode of a TV series." On Metacritic, the film has a weighted average score of 35 out of 100, based on 20 critics, indicating "generally unfavorable" reviews. Audiences polled by CinemaScore gave the film an average grade of "B+" on an A+ to F scale, while PostTrak reported filmgoers gave it a 63% overall positive score.
