= Django/Zorro =

American western swasbuckler comic book by Matt Wagner and Quentin Tarantino

- Django/Zorro #1 cover by Esteve Polls

Publication information
- Publisher: Dynamite Entertainment; Vertigo Comics
- Format: Limited series
- Genre: Western
- Publication date: November 2014 – May 2015
- No. of issues: 7
- Main characters: Django Freeman; Diego de la Vega / Zorro

Creative team
- Created by: Matt Wagner; Quentin Tarantino
- Written by: Matt Wagner; Quentin Tarantino
- Artist: Esteve Polls

Django/Zorro is an American revisionist Western swashbuckler comic book written by Matt Wagner and Quentin Tarantino, with art by Esteve Polls. The comic serves as a crossover sequel to both Wagner's comic book series Zorro (2008–2010) and Tarantino's film Django Unchained (2012).

A film adaptation is in active development, with Jamie Foxx and Antonio Banderas intended to reprise their roles.

== Publication history ==
A seven-issue series titled Django/Zorro was released by Dynamite Entertainment and Vertigo Comics, between November 2014 and May 2015. The comic serves as a sequel to Quentin Tarantino's Django Unchained (2012), being the first comic book sequel to a Tarantino film, and as a crossover adaptation with Matt Wagner's 20-issue Zorro comic book series, previously published by Dynamite from 2008 to 2010 and based on the character by Johnston McCulley (which earned him a nomination at the Eisner Awards for "Best Writer"). The series was co-written by Tarantino and Wagner, with art by Esteve Polls.

In a November 2014 interview, Wagner discussed the origins of the comics development, saying "I first met Quentin Tarantino when we got together to discuss the possibility of co-writing the first official sequel to any of his films, a comic-book adventure that would match the title character of Django Unchained with a classic character that I had helped redefine in recent years—the original masked-and-caped crusader, Zorro! Our connection was immediate and genuine and I knew that would translate into the adventures of our respective characters. Since the time frames of these two narratives were off by many years, I figured we'd need to invent a legacy version of Zorro—an all new character who takes up the masked identity for whatever reason in the years just preceding the American Civil War. But Quentin was adamant that we use the original Don Diego de la Vega in our tale. "No, no, no," he insisted, "It's gotta be the original Zorro! It's gotta be your Zorro!" I immediately saw how well such a scenario could work; in the film, Django Freeman enjoys a close relationship with another older man who serves as something of a mentor during his budding days as a bounty hunter, Dr. King Schultz. This motif provided us with an easy basis for our heroes' interaction and, just like that, our story was up and running."

== Reception ==
Zac Thompson of Bloody Disgusting gave the comic a positive review, writing "I truly believe you will enjoy this story if you like any of the creators or characters in these pages. To me, it feels like we've only just started and it looks like it'll be a really stylish story".

== Accolades ==
In 2015, Francesco Francavilla was nominated at the Eisner Awards for "Best Cover Artist", for his work on Django/Zorro.

== Film adaptation ==
In June 2019, Tarantino had picked Jerrod Carmichael to co-write a film adaptation based on the comic book series. Tarantino and Jamie Foxx have both expressed interest in having Antonio Banderas reprise his role as Zorro from The Mask of Zorro (1998) and The Legend of Zorro (2005) in the film in addition to Foxx himself reprising his role as Django. In a 2022 interview with GQ, Carmichael revealed that the film had been canceled. In April 2026, the film reentered development with Brian Helgeland writing the screenplay, but without Tarantino's involvement.
