= Kill or Be Killed (comics) =

American comic book series

- Cover to Kill or Be Killed #1, art by Sean Phillips

Publication information
- Publisher: Image Comics
- Schedule: Monthly
- Format: Ongoing
- Genre: Action, Crime, Supernatural, Psychological thriller
- Publication date: August 2016 – June 2018
- No. of issues: 20

Creative team
- Created by: Ed Brubaker, Sean Phillips
- Written by: Ed Brubaker
- Artist: Sean Phillips
- Colorist: Elizabeth Breitweiser
- Editor: Eric Stephenson

Kill or be Killed is an American comic book series created by writer Ed Brubaker and artist Sean Phillips. Elizabeth Breitweiser is the colorist. The series was announced in April 2016, and the first issue was published by Image Comics on August 3, 2016. The series received mostly positive reviews from critics until its conclusion with issue 20 in June 2018.

The story is about a suicidal college student who, working with a demon, becomes a vigilante. The comic examines the consequences of vigilante violence. Kill or be Killed debuted to mostly positive reviews, although some critics felt it was too similar to Brubaker and Phillips' previous collaborations.

== Publication history ==
=== Production ===
Kill or Be Killed is the sixth collaboration between Brubaker and Phillips, who had previously created other crime comics like Criminal, Fatale, and The Fade Out together. They first announced this series in April 2016 at the Image Expo, which was held during the Emerald City Comic Con. They promoted the series being "unlike anything [they have] done before" because it will be set in the present day and is designed as an ongoing series instead of a limited one with a predetermined course. Image partner Robert Kirkman suggested Brubaker aim for at least 50 issues.

The concept stemmed from Brubaker's effort to channel his feelings about the state of the world and take them to the extreme. Recent news reports made him feel "that there is no justice. Everybody gets away with everything. The world being at the edge of falling apart is where the whole story sprang from." He hopes the story taps into the "generational anger" he has observed. He describes the story as Death Wish meets Breaking Bad with the adventure of The Amazing Spider-Man comics from the 1970s.

Phillips chooses to be kept in the dark about the future of the series, never knowing any farther ahead than his current working script. For Kill or Be Killed, he is using digital tools and the same panel layout he has used on previous works, but removed the frame from the outside edges because he felt the full bleed makes the images feel more claustrophobic. Breitweiser, an integral part of the team, is coloring Phillips' art in a moody palette with gritty textures and incorporating color psychology.

=== Publication ===
The first issue had an initial print run of about 30,000 and was released on August 3, 2016. It quickly sold out at the distributor level and a second printing was announced August 9. The issue remained in high demand, and two additional printings were issued by December. It was the 93rd best selling comic book issue the month it was released. The second issue was released in September with an initial print run of about 23,800 copies. The 20% drop in orders for issue two was less than the industry average of 30%, and far less than the Image average of 50%. This issue was also a sell out and received additional printings. Orders for the third issue were a little higher, estimated at 23,900 copies. The first four issues sold in higher numbers than any of Brubaker and Phillips' previous collaborations. As part of Image Comics' 25th anniversary, Kill or Be Killed participated in the "tribute variants" with an alternate cover drawn by Phillips that paid homage to the first issue of The Walking Dead. The series concluded at issue 20 in June 2018.

The comic book was collected in a series of trade paperback volumes. The first volume, released January 18, 2017, contains issues 1–4 and the second volume, released August 9, 2017, contains issues 5–10. The third volume was released on January 19, 2018, collecting issues 11–14. A fourth volume was also released in 2018. Each single issue includes articles and other content written by guest contributors that are not included in the collected editions.

== Plot ==
=== Synopsis ===
Brubaker wanted to examine the reality of being a vigilante, and Kill or Be Killed focuses on the ramifications of violence and its effect on Dylan's loved ones. Brubaker said he chose to make the character young because he wanted to include the optimism of youth. The demonic element to the story also allows Brubaker to play with the idea of "If you had to kill a bad person, who would you pick?" Although Dylan becomes a murderer at the beginning of the story, Brubaker hopes the character's plight is sympathetic enough that readers will root for him. Dylan's arrangement with the demon has been interpreted as commentary on the war on terror and the racially motivated violence publicised in the US in the two years prior to the book's publication.

=== Plot ===
Dylan, a 28 year-old grad student, is depressed because he is in love with his best friend, Kira, but she is dating Dylan's roommate, Mason. He has a cynical worldview and criticizes the world for its materialism, and at the same time wishes he could connect better with the people in it. When his roommate is away one night, Dylan and Kira begin a secret affair. When Dylan overhears Mason and Kira discussing how pitiful he is, Dylan decides to commit suicide. He jumps off a tall building, but survives due to unlikely events. That night, he is visited by a demon who claims he spared Dylan's life. The demon says Dylan must now murder one person for every additional month he wants to live. Dylan convinces himself this was a hallucination, but he begins to grow sick as the end of the month approaches. When the demon appears a second time, Dylan decides to track down a man who molested Dylan's friend when they were children. After shooting him, Dylan's sickness goes away. The next month, Dylan struggles to find another target he feels deserves to die. He settles on a brothel run by a Russian mob. He murders one of the men, but is violently beaten by one of the sex workers before he escapes. His unexplained injuries lead Kira to end their secret romance, although they remain friends. Dylan begins taking boxing lessons and stalking a corrupt businessman. A detective, Lily Sharpe, begins to connect the dots between Dylan's murders; the Russian mob, and begins to hunt for Dylan.

== Critical reception ==
In his review for Adventures in Poor Taste, Nick Nafpliotis described the main character's flaws as "uncomfortably relatable." He and other reviewers noted visual similarities to the Sam Raimi Spider-Man films and the pulp hero The Shadow. Reviewer Zedric Dimalanta was impressed with the Phillips' accurate depiction of speed loading a shotgun. Reviewers David Pepose and Drew Bradley praised Breitweiser for "sell[ing] the mood" and adding depth and texture to the finished page. Nothing But Comics called it the best new series of 2016.

In his review of the first issue, Nick Hanover said "the craft on display is unsurprisingly proficient," but that aside from Breitwesier's colors, it does not distinguish itself from the team's earlier works. He drew comparisons to Fatale and Criminal, lamenting that Kill or Be Killed fails to live up to the promise of being unlike anything they had done previously. Matthew Garcia agreed in his review for Multiversity Comics, saying that while the story was well made and entertaining, the themes and content were unsurprising. In his Newsarama review, Pepose called the deal with the demon that sets the story in motion and establishes the status quo the weakest point of the story.

In 2017, the series was nominated for Eisner Awards in the categories "Best Continuing Series", "Best Writer", "Best Cover Artist", and "Best Coloring". Phillips was also nominated for "Best Pencillier/Inker or Penciller/Inker Team" at the 2019 Eisner Awards.

== Collected editions ==
Title	Issues collected	Pages	Format	Publisher	Released	ISBN
Kill Or Be Killed Vol. 1	Kill Or Be Killed #1-4	128	TPB	Image	24 Jan 2017	978-1534300286
Kill Or Be Killed Vol. 2	Kill Or Be Killed #5-10	176	TPB	Image	15 Aug 2017	978-1534302280
Kill Or Be Killed Vol. 3	Kill Or Be Killed #11-14	120	TPB	Image	23 Jan 2018	978-1534304710
Kill Or Be Killed Vol. 4	Kill Or Be Killed #15-20	144	TPB	Image	21 Aug 2018	978-1534306516
Kill Or Be Killed Compendium	Kill Or Be Killed #1-20	600	TPB	Image	25 Feb 2025	978-1534333949
Kill Or Be Killed: The Deluxe Edition	Kill Or Be Killed #1-20	624	OHC	Image	26 Nov 2019	978-1534313606

== Film adaptation ==
In December 2017, a film adaptation of the comic was announced. It will be written by Daniel Casey and directed by Chad Stahelski.

As of August 2026, nothing has come of light from the project and Stahelski seems to no longer be attached to it.

== See also ==
- Criminal
- The Fade Out
- Fatale
- Incognito
- Sleeper
