= Jen Bartel =

American illustrator and comic artist

- Born: Los Angeles, California, U.S.
- Occupation: Illustrator
- Website: www.jenbartel.com

Jen Bartel is an American illustrator and comic artist, best known for her work for Marvel Comics and Image Comics. She co-created the comic Blackbird for Image with Sam Humphries. She won two Eisner Awards for her work as a cover artist in 2019 and 2022.

== Personal life ==
Jen Bartel was born in Los Angeles and is from Korean and Japanese descent. She spent her childhood, from first grade up to graduating high school in South Korea. She is queer.

== Career ==
Bartel was scouted for mainstream comics cover work after she published her fan art on social media platforms.

Bartel created the cover art for Star Wars: Women of the Galaxy, and DC: Women of Action, both published by Chronicle Books.

She created graphic designs for Adidas brand shoes featuring the Marvel Cinematic Universe character Captain Marvel, and Marvel Cinematic Universe character Thanos tied in with the releases of the Captain Marvel and Avengers: Endgame films in 2019.

Bartel also created graphic designs for the Puma and Foot Locker corporation featuring DC Extended Universe character Harley Quinn timed to coincide with the release of the DC Extended Universe film Birds of Prey (and the Fantabulous Emancipation of One Harley Quinn).

In 2021 Bartel created a Marvel variant cover collection to celebrate Women's History Month. She created eight covers that showed off some othe most popular Marvel female characters. Starting in 2022, Bartel was the main cover artist for Rainbow Rowell's She-Hulk.

In 2023, she continued her freelance work with Marvel. As part of the annual Hellfire Gala event, Bartel was commissioned by Marvel with designing a new gala outfit for Captain Marvel. It was included as a variant cover with Captain Marvel: Dark Tempest #1. With the new relaunch of the Captain Marvel volume that coincided with The Marvels, she was tasked with redesigning with the characters' costume using her own previous design as the base.

Bartel is set to draw and write a story alongside creating a cover for Ignition Press's upcoming annual anthology Love Ignited 2027. It is slated for a January 2027 release.

== Awards and nominations ==
She has won two Eisner Awards for her work as a cover artist on Blackbird (Image) and Submerged (Vault) in 2019 and in 2022 for her Wonder Woman and Women of Marvel covers. Besides her two wins she was nominated in 2020 and 2023 for the same award.

In 2018, The Marvel Comic America, to which Bartel contributed as one artist among 18 creators, was nominated for a GLAAD media award.
