= Criminal (comics) =

American comic book series by Ed Brubaker and Sean Phillips

- Cover to Criminal vol. 1, #1 (October 2006), art by Sean Phillips.

Publication information
- Publisher: Marvel Comics; Image Comics
- Schedule: Monthly
- Format: Ongoing series
- Genre: Crime
- Publication date: October 2006 – present
- No. of issues: (vol. 1): 10 (vol. 2): 7 (vol. 3): 5 (vol. 4): 4 (vol. 5): 12
- Main character(s): Leo Patterson; Tracy Lawless; Jake "Gnarly" Brown

Creative team
- Created by: Ed Brubaker; Sean Phillips
- Written by: Ed Brubaker
- Artist: Sean Phillips
- Colorist(s): Val Staples; Elizabeth Breitweiser; Jacob Phillips

Collected editions
- Coward: ISBN 0-7851-2439-X
- Lawless: ISBN 0-7851-2816-6
- The Dead and the Dying: ISBN 0-7851-3227-9
- Bad Night: ISBN 0-7851-3228-7
- The Sinners: ISBN 0-7851-3229-5
- The Last of the Innocent: ISBN 0-7851-5829-4
- Wrong Time, Wrong Place: ISBN 1-63215-877-9

Criminal is an American creator-owned comic book series written by Ed Brubaker and illustrated by Sean Phillips. It was originally published by Marvel Comics' Icon imprint and later by Image Comics. The series is a meditation on the clichés of the crime genre while remaining realistic and believable.

== Publication history ==
The first series began in October 2006, and ran for ten issues, which were published as two trade paperback editions, Coward (issues #1-5) and Lawless (issues #6-10), in 2007. In Coward, pickpocket Leo Patterson gets involved in an armored car heist that is not what it seems. In Lawless, AWOL soldier Tracy Lawless infiltrates his brother Ricky's former gang to find out who murdered Ricky. A second series began in February 2008, and ran for seven issues. The first three issues, overlapping stories from the points of view of three characters involved in organized crime in the 1970s, were collected as The Dead and the Dying (issues #1-3, 2008). Issues #4-7 were collected as Bad Night (issues #4-7, 2009). A third series ran for five issues in 2009–2010, and was collected as The Sinners (2010). A fourth series followed in 2011, which ran for four issues, and was collected as The Last of the Innocent (2011).

In 2009, Coward, Lawless and The Dead and the Dying were reprinted as a 432-page "Deluxe Edition" hardcover. Included in this edition are a number of extras, including three of the original backpages "essays" with all 13 original accompanying pieces of art, the Comic Book Legal Defense Fund short story No One Rides For Free, the original Coward "trailer" announcing the series, a covers gallery, and a number of pages describing the "process" of making the book. A second hardcover collecting Bad Night, The Sinners, and Last of the Innocent was published in October 2012.

The six trade paperback editions were republished by Image Comics in 2014. Two one-shot issues of new material, Criminal Special Edition (February 2015) and Criminal 10th Anniversary Special (April 2016), followed, and were collected as Wrong Time, Wrong Place in September 2016.

In 2017, Ed Brubaker and Sean Phillips released My Heroes Have Always Been Junkies, a hardcover standalone book. While the author notes that the volume is not officially book 8 of Criminal, it does feature a minor character from an earlier volume, now in a central role.

In December 2020, a third deluxe hardcover volume was published. It collects My Heroes Have Always Been Junkies and Bad Weekend.

Brubaker and Phillips, along with Jacob Phillips as colorist, returned to Criminal with a new series published by Image in January 2019. The first issue's story takes place in 1988 and focuses on Teeg Lawless. At the end of the story, Brubaker notes that part of the impetus for the new series is to tell stories of various lengths (from single issues to serialized) with jumps in time. Brubaker writes that he "doesn't want you to know where you're going. Just that it's probably to the wrong side of town". Twelve issues were published between January 2019 and January 2020, with two issues collected in an expanded format as the novella Bad Weekend in July 2019. Nine of the remaining 10 issues were collected in 2020 in a deluxe hardcover titled Cruel Summer, which can be seen as the fourth volume in the collected deluxe hardcover series.

In January 2025, Image Comics announced they would reissue trade paperbacks of all previously produced Criminal material as a way to promote the Criminal television series. Volumes one and two, Coward and Lawless, were republished with new covers and trade dress on 22 January 2025. These books include comics originally released in 2006 and 2007. Further volumes were released on a monthly basis through the rest of the year.

The reissues culminated with The Knives, a new original graphic novel written by Brubaker and Philips, which was released into comic shops on August 27, 2025. With only four days of sale, it went straight into the top-10 graphic novel charts for that month.

== Plot ==
The series' story arcs are self-contained and focus on different characters; however, these central characters inhabit the same world, grew up in fictional Center City, frequent the same bar, and share a common history of two generations of crime. With his partner Ivan, Tommy Patterson ran the city's most proficient crew of pickpockets and taught the trade to his eight-year-old son, Leo. When Tommy was arrested and imprisoned for the murder of Teeg Lawless, Ivan took care of Leo and explained to him how following certain rules can keep a criminal "out in the world", out of both prison and the morgue.

Around the same time, Teeg Lawless' two sons were arrested. While his fifteen-year-old brother Ricky was sent to a juvenile work camp, Tracy Lawless was given the option of going to prison or enlisting in the armed forces. Tracy joined the U.S. Army, abandoning Ricky but honing his skills as a soldier.

=== Volume 1 ===
==== Coward ====
(Issues #1-5, Oct 06 – Mar 07)

The story begins five years after Leo Patterson was the only survivor of the disastrous "Salt Bay job", and fifteen years after his father Tommy, in state prison for the murder of Teeg Lawless, was killed by another inmate. Since then, Leo has kept a low profile as a pickpocket while he struggles to take care of Ivan, Tommy's old friend and partner-in-crime, who suffers from both Alzheimer's disease and an addiction to heroin. Leo has a strict set of rules he adheres to, and a reputation for being brilliant at planning scores, but also as a coward who runs from conflict and always manages to escape a bad situation. Both aspects attract the attention of Seymour, another Salt Bay survivor, and crooked cop Jeff. They try to recruit Leo for an armored-car heist, telling him a police evidence van will be carrying $5 million in diamonds to the courthouse. He refuses, unwilling to return to that life, but Seymour knows Leo can't refuse Greta, a recovering heroin addict and widow of Terry Watson, who was also killed at Salt Bay. Greta needs the money from the heist to start a new life with her daughter Angie, and blames Leo for her husband's death. Leo reluctantly agrees and recruits his friend Donnie, an epileptic con man.

When Jeff includes his own partners in the score, Leo and Greta suspect a double-cross, but they continue with the heist. Leo, however, doesn't anticipate that Jeff and his partners will pull guns and start shooting in the middle of the job, killing Donnie and wounding Greta. Leo, having made a back-up plan, manages to escape with Greta and the score, which they discover isn't diamonds but a briefcase full of uncut heroin. Jeff and his partners work for a drug kingpin named "Roy-L.T." Hyde, and the evidence-van heist was intended both to retrieve his merchandise and facilitate the release of his lieutenant, Delron. "Roy-L" kills one of Jeff's partners as punishment, and sends the recently freed Delron with Jeff to track down the heroin. While she recovers, Greta, Ivan, and Leo lie low at Leo's grandfather's farm. As Leo and Greta succumb to their mutual attraction and have sex, Ivan goes looking for a fix and discovers the stash of heroin. Meanwhile, Jeff and Delron track down Greta's mother and daughter.

The next morning, Leo is devastated to find Ivan dead, having overdosed on the uncut heroin. He withdraws emotionally from Greta as he buries Ivan, and she lashes out in frustration, calling him a coward. He returns alone to the city and meets with "Genuine Jen" Waters, and old friend now Internal Affairs officer, who theorizes that Jeff hoped Leo would escape, but without the drugs, drawing the attention of the police while he paid his debt to "Roy-L". Meanwhile, distraught over Leo and tempted by the heroin, Greta calls her mother's house, where Jeff and Delron are waiting to trace the call after having killed Greta's mother. Leo breaks into Seymour's apartment, looking for leverage against him, but finds a message on his answering machine: Jeff ordering him to join them in going after Greta.

Leo races back to the farm, finding Greta tortured to death. Seymour appears, having stayed behind with a picture of Angie behind held hostage. As they retrieve the briefcase of heroin, Seymour tells Leo that he's just as much a coward as everyone says; Leo retorts that his father didn't kill Teeg Lawless: Leo did. Leo throws an open bag of heroin in Seymour's face and coldly executes him, saying that what he's really afraid of is his own capacity for violence. He then tracks Delron to a local motel and stabs him to death, rescuing Angie. After leaving her with Gnarly, a bartender and old friend of his father, he tricks Jeff into leading him to "Roy-L" and kills him and his men in a gun battle. Jeff and Leo shoot each other several times; Jeff calls for backup and tries to flee, but Leo, knowing that Jeff participated in Greta's torture, follows and finishes him off. Severely wounded and too weak to escape the arriving police, Leo realizes that dying is a lot harder than killing and quips, "just my luck".

==== Lawless ====
(Issues #6-10, May 07 – Nov 07) After an incident that began in a bar in Baghdad's Green Zone, Tracy Lawless served eighteen months in a military prison, isolated from contact with the outside world. Upon release, he discovers that his brother Ricky was killed nine months earlier, and he soon goes AWOL to find out what happened. On the way to the city, he stops at the Center City docks long enough to rob two men carrying a briefcase of illicit cash, shooting one in the process. He finds an old acquaintance named Jacob, a now-crippled criminal who specializes in creating false identities. Since he isn't recognized by Jacob, Tracy is confident he can infiltrate Ricky's old crew to discover why his brother was killed. Tracy finds the crew—Gray, Nelson, Davey, and Ricky's lover Mallory—meeting frequently at the Undertow in obvious anticipation of an upcoming heist. Tracy quietly introduces himself to certain criminals as Sam West, a "wheelman" looking for a score, and, after killing the crew's driver Davey, he approaches Gray and Mallory and tells them that he's "a guy who can drive". As the team gets ready for the upcoming score Tracy investigates his brother's death. This brings him closer to Mallory, who figures out his real identity. It is later revealed that it was Mallory who killed Ricky as he was too self-destructive and would beat her regularly. This makes Tracy kidnap Mallory during the heist leaving the rest of the crew to the police. During the chase, Tracy is followed by men who work for Sebastian Hyde, who owned the money Tracy previously stole. After considering killing her, Tracy lets Mallory go only for her to be kidnapped by Hyde's men. This forces Tracy to meet Hyde, who wants retribution for his stolen money. Instead of having Mallory killed as revenge he lets her go and recruits Tracy into his outfit because his skills as a soldier would be useful.

=== Volume 2 ===
==== The Dead and the Dying ====
(Vol. 2, issues #1-3, Feb 08 – Apr 08)

Three stand-alone interlocking stories are set in 1972. The first centers around prizefighter Jake "Gnarly" Brown, and tells of how the Hydes came to be the crime bosses of the city. The second centers of Tracy Lawless's father Teegar, a newly return Vietnam war veteran and his involvement in a heist pulled under false pretenses. The third is centered on Danica, a femme fatale involved at various points with Jake, Lawless and Sebastian Hyde.

==== Bad Night ====
(Vol. 2, issues #4-7, Jul 08 – Nov 08)

This storyline centers around Jacob, the writer and artist of the 'Frank Kafka PI' newspaper strips which appeared in Coward and who made an appearance in Lawless. The insomniac and former counterfeiter gets drawn into a plan by a man and his girlfriend who want to impersonate an FBI agent.

=== Miniseries ===
==== The Sinners ====
(5 issue miniseries, Oct 2009 – Mar 2010)

After a wave of murders that target various high-profile, supposedly untouchable crime figures, Tracy Lawless is assigned to find the killers and stop them before a citywide gang war erupts, while an Army CID agent arrives at Center City to capture the deserting Sgt. Lawless. He discovers a priest is using children to assassinate the "evil" in his city. Lawless is able to stop this scheme, but not until after Hyde is killed.

==== The Last of the Innocent ====
(4 issue miniseries, May 2011 – Aug 2011)

Owing money to a loan shark and discovering his wealthy wife is cheating on him, Riley decides to murder her and use her money to pay off his debt. The story is inspired by Archie Comics, and features several sequences drawn in the house style of that series.

=== Other ===
==== No One Rides for Free ====
(5 page short story appearing in Liberty Comics #1)

Tracy shakes down a reporter who has written an exposé on Sebastian Hyde's corporate dealings.

==== 21st Century Noir ====
(6 page short story appearing in Noir, a collection of short stories from Dark Horse)

A man meets a woman online, meets her for sex, and finds out about her abusive husband.

==== Teeg's Christmas Carol ====
(12 page short story appearing in Image! 30th Anniversary Anthology #9, December 2022)

Set on Christmas Day, Teeg Lawless is reflecting on the traumas of his own childhood Christmases, and contemplating his family's current bleak holiday season.

==== Special Edition ====
(One-shot special, February 2015)

Teeg Lawless is in jail and fends off fellow inmates who are after the bounty on his head. This story is also known as Savage Sword Of Criminal.

==== 10th Anniversary Special ====
(One-shot special, April 2016)

A young Tracy Lawless helps his father with criminal activities while travelling cross country. This story is also known as Deadly Hands Of Criminal.

==== Coward's Way Out ====
An arc that Brubaker has mentioned multiple times since the end of Coward, but has not yet been published. It would be a follow up to Coward, and would be about Leo's escape from prison. Brubaker has indicated this arc may be told in the fifth volume of Criminal.

==== My Heroes Have Always Been Junkies ====
(Image Comics, 2018)

The first original graphic novel from Brubaker and Phillips features a character who is revealed to be part of the Criminal universe. Its success inspired the revival of Criminal as a monthly comic in 2019.

== Characters ==
- Leo Patterson: A criminal prodigy and childhood friend to Ricky Lawless. Capable of envisioning many angles to commit any heist given a small period of time. Despite his perceived cowardice, he has a deadly streak.
- Tommy Patterson: Part of the best pick-pocketing crew with his friend Ivan. He was convicted and imprisoned for the murder of Teeg Lawless, which was actually committed by his son Leo.
- Tracy Lawless: A veteran soldier, Tracy abandoned his unit and returned to Center City to investigate the circumstances of his brother Rick's murder.
- Teeg Lawless: A Vietnam war veteran who unknowingly stole from Sebastian Hyde and eventually ended up working for him as an enforcer. His son Tracy would be the same many years later. He was killed by Leo Patterson.
- Ricky Lawless: Brother of Tracy and son of Teeg. An impulsive and struggling teen who grows up to follow his father into a life of crime.
- Jacob Kurtz: An expert forger and author of popular newspaper strip 'Frank Kafka, Private Eye', he's an acquaintance of Tracy and was once married to Sebastian Hyde's niece.
- Sebastian Hyde: The city's kingpin of crime. Most characters in the series have had some kind of dealings with him. He is killed in the final issue of The Sinners miniseries by two young boys who were sent by Tracy Lawless, who was upset that Hyde had brutally beaten his wife after discovering her affair with Lawless.
- Jake 'Gnarly' Brown: Owner and manager of the Undertown bar (known as "The Undertow" due to the "n" part of the neon sign having long been damaged and never repaired). His father Clevon was instrumental in helping Walter Hyde (Sebastian's father) take over the reins of organized crime in Center City, and as such he lived at the Hyde estate and grew up with Sebastian as his best friend.

== Collected editions ==
The series has been collected into a series of trade paperbacks, hardcover, and deluxe hardcover editions.

=== Trade paperbacks / standard hardcovers ===
#	Title	Years covered	Issues collected	Pages	Publisher	Released	ISBN
1	Coward	2006–2007	Criminal (2006) #1-5	128	Icon	23 May 2007	978-0785124399
1	Coward	2006–2007	Criminal (2006) #1-5	128	Image	10 Feb 2015	978-1632151704
1	Coward	2006–2007	Criminal (2006) #1-5	144	Image	4 Feb 2025	978-1534370906
2	Lawless	2007	Criminal (2006) #6-10	128	Icon	20 Dec 2007	978-0785128168
2	Lawless	2007	Criminal (2006) #6-10	128	Image	3 Mar 2015	978-1632152039
2	Lawless	2007	Criminal (2006) #6-10	144	Image	4 Feb 2025	978-1534385078
3	The Dead And The Dying	2008	Criminal 2 (2008) #1-3	104	Icon	23 Jul 2008	978-0785132271
3	The Dead And The Dying	2008	Criminal 2 (2008) #1-3	128	Image	7 Apr 2015	978-1632152336
3	The Dead And The Dying	2008	Criminal 2 (2008) #1-3	128	Image	4 Mar 2025	978-1534341869
4	Bad Night	2008	Criminal 2 (2008) #4-7	120	Icon	Jan 2009	978-0785132288
4	Bad Night	2008	Criminal 2 (2008) #4-7	120	Image	5 May 2015	978-1632152602
4	Bad Night	2008	Criminal 2 (2008) #4-7	120	Image	1 Apr 2025	978-1534374003
5	The Sinners	2009–2010	Criminal: The Sinners #1-5	120	Icon	30 Jun 2010	978-0785132295
5	The Sinners	2009–2010	Criminal: The Sinners #1-5	120	Image	16 Jun 2015	978-1632152985
5	The Sinners	2009–2010	Criminal: The Sinners #1-5	144	Image	6 May 2025	978-1534347281
6	The Last Of The Innocent	2011	Criminal: The Last Of The Innocent #1-4	120	Icon	12 Jan 2012	978-0785158295
6	The Last Of The Innocent	2011	Criminal: The Last Of The Innocent #1-4	120	Image	14 Jul 2015	978-1632152992
6	The Last Of The Innocent	2011	Criminal: The Last Of The Innocent #1-4	144	Image	3 Jun 2025	978-1534357617
7	Wrong Time, Wrong Place	2016	Savage Sword Of Criminal; Deadly Hands Of Criminal	112	Image	13 Sep 2016	978-1632158772
7	Wrong Time, Wrong Place	2016	Savage Sword Of Criminal; Deadly Hands Of Criminal	120	Image	1 Jul 2025	978-1534353619
8	My Heroes Have Always Been Junkies	2018	OGN	72	Image	16 Oct 2018	HC: 978-1534308466
8	My Heroes Have Always Been Junkies	2018	OGN	72	Image	10 Dec 2019	TPB: 978-1534315150
8	My Heroes Have Always Been Junkies	2018	OGN	80	Image	5 Aug 2025	TPB: 978-1534350670
9	Bad Weekend	2019	Criminal (2019) #2-3	72	Image	16 Jul 2019	HC: 978-1534314405
9	Bad Weekend	2019	Criminal (2019) #2-3	80	Image	2 Sep 2025	TPB: 978-1534375178
10	Cruel Summer	2019–2020	Criminal (2019) #1, 5–12	272	Image	1 Feb 2022	978-1534321892
10	Cruel Summer	2019–2020	Criminal (2019) #1, 5–12	272	Image	7 Oct 2025	978-1534366671
	The Knives	2025	OGN	200	Image	9 Sep 2025	HC: 978-1534355590
	Five Gears in Reverse	2026	OGN	144	Image	27 May 2026	HC: 978-1534333208

=== Deluxe hardcovers ===
#	Title	Years covered	Issues collected	Pages	Publisher	Released	ISBN
1	Criminal: The Deluxe Edition Vol.1	2006–2008	Criminal (2006) #1-10; Criminal 2 (2008) #1-3	432	Icon	4 Nov 2009	978-0785142294
1	Criminal: The Deluxe Edition Vol.1	2006–2008	Criminal (2006) #1-10; Criminal 2 (2008) #1-3	432	Image	12 Sep 2017	978-1534305410
2	Criminal: The Deluxe Edition Vol. 2	2008–2011	Criminal (2008) #4-7; Criminal: The Sinners #1-5; Criminal: The Last Of The Innocent #1-4	432	Icon	3 Oct 2012	978-0785165842
2	Criminal: The Deluxe Edition Vol. 2	2008–2011	Criminal (2008) #4-7; Criminal: The Sinners #1-5; Criminal: The Last Of The Innocent #1-4	432	Image	12 Sep 2017	978-1534305434
3	Criminal: The Deluxe Edition Vol. 3	2016–2019	Savage Sword Of Criminal; Deadly Hands Of Criminal; My Heroes Have Always Been Junkies OGN; Bad Weekend OGN; Criminal (2019) #1, 4	400	Image	1 Dec 2020	978-1534317062
4	Cruel Summer	2019–2020	Criminal (2019) #1, 5–12	288	Image	18 Aug 2020	978-1534316430

== Reception ==
In 2007, the series won the Eisner Award for Best New Series. Criminal: The Last of the Innocent won the 2012 Eisner Award for Best Limited Series. My Heroes Have Always Been Junkies won the 2019 Eisner Award for Best Graphic Album – New.

== TV adaptation ==
In February 2023, Amazon Studios began development on a TV series based on Criminal, with Brubaker serving as showrunner, writer, and executive producer. Novelist Jordan Harper is co-showrunner of the project, working alongside Brubaker. In January 2024, it was announced the series was officially given a series order. In April 2024, Anna Boden and Ryan Fleck were hired to direct the first four episodes of the season.

== See also ==
- The Fade Out
- Fatale
- Incognito
- Kill Or Be Killed
- Sleeper
