= List of Preacher story arcs =

This article is a list of story arcs in the Vertigo comic book series Preacher.

== Main series ==
=== "Gone to Texas" (issues 1–7) ===
Reverend Jesse Custer, a tough and principled Texan preacher who has lost his faith, is possessed by a mysterious entity called Genesis—a conscienceless offspring of an angel and a demon whose power may rival that of God Himself. Through insight granted him by Genesis, now lodged in Jesse's mind in a sort of supernatural symbiosis, Jesse learns that God has left Heaven and abandoned his responsibilities, and that he (Jesse) possesses the power of The Word Of God—depicted in the comic through the use of red text (a reference to the printing method often used for indicating Jesus' speech in the Bible)—allowing him to deliver irresistible commands to any being, whereupon the commanded cannot help but to comply fully. Armed with these newfound attributes, he sets out on a quest to find God (literally) and make Him answer for His dereliction of duty.

Accompanying Jesse on his journey are Tulip O'Hare, Jesse's former girlfriend who has long thought that he abandoned her, and Cassidy, a 100-year-old Irish vampire who prefers a pint in the pub to the blood of the innocent. Their first stop is New York City, where Cassidy introduces them to a freelance journalist friend, Si Coltrane, who claims to have insight into God's whereabouts.

Meanwhile, in Heaven, a quorum of angels, trying desperately to keep things from falling apart, decide to send the Saint of Killers—an immortal, unstoppable killing machine—to Earth with orders to recapture Genesis at any cost.

=== "Until the End of the World" (issues 8–17) ===
- In "All in the Family", Jesse's secret past is revealed as he is forced to confront his family, and the horrible childhood he's been running from his entire life, when he and Tulip are tracked down by his grandmother's henchmen, Jody and T.C. To his horror, Jesse's Word of God does not work on them, and he and Tulip are taken to his grandmother's manor deep in the Louisiana marshes. He tells Tulip of his past: how his mother ran away from home and met his father, John Custer, a Marine just returned from Vietnam; how her mother's henchmen tracked them down after Jesse was born and took them back; his physical and mental torture, and how they murdered both his father and mother; and how he was forced to become a preacher. Jody shoots Tulip through the head, but she is resurrected by God, who commands her to tell Jesse to abandon his quest. Jesse, about to give up after Tulip's apparent death, finds his strength again, and with it, his power returns (though God takes credit for "giving it back"); he finally defeats Jody and kills his grandmother and all of her henchmen, and he and Tulip escape.
- In "Hunters", Jesse and Tulip, now reconciled, travel west to San Francisco and reunite with Cassidy. Cassidy enlists Jesse's help in avenging his (Cassidy's) girlfriend's death by heroin overdose, which leads them to an armadillo-sodomizing bacchanalist by the name of Jesus de Sade. There, they are confronted by The Grail, an ancient and immensely powerful religious conspiracy dedicated to preserving the bloodline of Christ and facilitating the Second Coming. The Grail is personified by a ruthless, clever and ambitious German military expert known only as 'Herr Starr', leader of a conspiracy within the Grail to replace the real descendant of Jesus with Jesse for the Grail's planned orchestration of Armageddon (to occur in the then-future, A.D. 2000). After pretending to be Jesse to save Tulip's life, Cassidy is captured by Starr and taken to Masala, the Grail's secret fortress in France.

=== "Proud Americans" (issues 18–26) ===
While waiting for his flight to France to rescue Cassidy, Jesse meets Billy Baker, a retired Vietnam veteran who was best friends with John Custer, Jesse's dad. Baker, nicknamed Spaceman, tells Jesse the story of how he and John fragged an obnoxious superior who caused the death of another soldier, and gives Jesse a photograph of John from his Vietnam days.

Cassidy, still believed by Starr to be Jesse, is brought to the Grail's heavily guarded secret fortress ('Masada'), but his cover is blown when he is unable to utilize Jesse's Word of God. He is subsequently imprisoned and tortured by a gelded, sadistic Mafioso named Frankie the Eunuch. Herr Starr, his conspiracy within the Grail uncovered by Jesse's arrival, shows Jesse an angel held captive in the dungeons, who is revealed to be the father of Genesis. The Saint of Killers arrives seeking vengeance, but promises to spare Jesse if he can use Genesis' memories to tell the Saint the story behind his family's death in the late 19th century. Starr initiates his coup against the All-Father of the Grail, resulting in the total destruction of Masada and most of the Grail infantry.

Upon their return to the States, a grateful Cassidy tells Jesse his life's story: how he fought in the 1916 Easter Rising in Ireland, how he was assaulted by a bog-hag outside of Dublin and turned into a vampire, and how he arrived penniless in America and began his long love affair with New York City.

=== "Dixie Fried" (issues 27–33) ===
Cassidy drunkenly proclaims his love for Tulip, beginning an arc of betrayal that lasts the rest of the series. On Cassidy's advice, the three decide to visit New Orleans and use voodoo to unlock the secrets of Genesis, though Cassidy fails to mention his previous run-in with a group of goth wannabe vampires, Les Enfants du Sang, who want him to change them into the undead (this story is revealed to the reader in the Cassidy: Blood and Whiskey spinoff).

The trio arrive in New Orleans, where an old friend of Cassidy's—a voodoo priest—agrees to help Jesse unlock the secrets locked deep within Genesis, including the story of the Saint of Killers. Unfortunately, Les Enfants du Sang are still looking for Cassidy, and arrive at the cemetery where the voodoo ritual is being held. Behind Jesse's back, Cassidy, drinking heavier than usual, becomes more aggressive towards Tulip, insisting that she also loves him but is afraid to admit it. The story of the Saint is revealed to Jesse, but the vampires attack the party and decapitate Cassidy before Tulip and Jesse kill them all.

Ultimately the trio leave New Orleans without answers and decide to travel to the American Southwest, but not before the priest warns Tulip that Cassidy is thoughtless and weak, and not to be trusted.

=== "War in the Sun" (issues 34–40) ===
Jesse and company head to Monument Valley, Utah, where Jesse intends to ingest peyote to try and trigger a vision of Genesis' secrets. However, the Saint of Killers and Herr Starr are waiting for him, with Starr commanding a tank battalion and an atom bomb on "loan" from the U.S. government. Jesse reveals to the Saint the details of God's complicity in his (the Saint's) family's death; enraged, the Saint declares them even and releases his anger on the army, killing them all.

Starr escapes and orders the atomic attack, which the Saint survives (contemptuously declaring "Not enough gun"). The blast knocks Jesse out of the airplane in which he, Cassidy and Tulip have escaped; though Cassidy tries to save him, Jesse realizes they will both die and uses the Word to force Cassidy to let go. Miraculously, he survives, and is found by a strange hermit while wandering through the desert, delirious and missing an eye (how Jesse survived is revealed at end of the "Salvation" storyline). After a month of recovery, Jesse tracks down Cassidy and Tulip in Phoenix, only to discover that, believing him dead, they have begun an affair, which Cassidy perpetuates by playing on Tulip's drug-dazed mourning. Disillusioned and alone, Jesse abandons his quest and allows Cassidy and Tulip to think he is dead.

Meanwhile, Starr (also separated from his forces) is found by a clan of cannibal inbreds who cut off his leg and plan on killing Starr and eating his corpse. Starr kills them and escapes, reuniting with the Grail.

=== "Salvation" (issues 41–50) ===
Presumed dead and feeling betrayed by both his true love and his best friend, Jesse takes a job as sheriff of the tiny town of Salvation, Texas, where he and his Deputy Cindy Dagget deal with domestic disputes, the KKK, and the robber baron of the town, the psychotic Odin Quincannon. He also discovers that the acerbic, one-armed owner of the local bar is his long lost (and presumed dead) mother, Christina (known in the town as Jodie). Before he leaves, having broken Quincannon's hold on the town and restoring it to freedom, Christina gives Jesse the one possession of his father's that she has kept: his Medal of Honor.

Later, Jesse takes the peyote he kept with him, which causes him to remember the events in Monument Valley after his fall: how God saved him from death and asked him outright to give up his quest. Jesse refused and went so far as to begin to command God, incurring the Almighty's wrath and losing his eye. Just as God was about to kill Jesse, the Saint of Killers appeared, scaring God off. Jesse awakens from his vision armed with God's weakness.

Before returning to his quest, Jesse reunites with Spaceman at the Vietnam Memorial, to hear the story of the Medal of Honor his father received; inspired by his father's heroism, Jesse rediscovers his sense of purpose.

=== "All Hell's A-Coming" (issues 51–58) ===
Tulip, who leaves Cassidy in a moment of clarity, reunites with Jesse and the two sever ties with Cassidy. Unable to shake Cassidy's betrayal, Jesse finds the truth from someone who knew him. He then meets with the Saint of Killers, and the two form an unlikely alliance in their mutual quest for revenge on the Lord. Jesse and Tulip travel to the Alamo, where the stage is set for his final confrontation with Cassidy, the Grail, and God.

Meanwhile, Arseface becomes a music sensation when a record producer recruits him and convinces him to release a cover of the Alanis Morissette song "You Oughta Know". However, a rash of suicides from fans of Arseface and the corrupt antics of the producer ultimately end with Arseface losing all of the money he made off of his singing career and universally reviled by the media.

Finally, Herr Starr kills Eisenstein, the remaining figure standing between him and complete control over the Grail, but at the cost of his genitals.

=== "Alamo" (issues 59–66) ===
At the Alamo, Jesse's great quest finally comes to an end. He enlists the Saint of Killers to murder God, realizing it is the only way to free the world from His oppressive and selfish machinations. In order to set God up for the Saint, Jesse must release Genesis, and the only way to do this is to die himself. To achieve this, Jesse arranges a final showdown between himself and Cassidy at the Alamo. Beforehand, he tips off Starr, who has decided to kill Jesse out of revenge for the various mutilations he has suffered trying to recruit him for the Grail.

In the end, Starr kills Jesse, and then is killed by Tulip. Cassidy, having earned Jesse's forgiveness and friendship, dies by suicide via the morning sun. However, unknown to everyone, Cassidy had struck a deal with God prior to the confrontation wherein He would resurrect Jesse. God does so and returns to heaven, where he finds the Saint of Killers waiting for him, having murdered all of the angels who "got in his way." After a short standoff, the Saint guns God down, ending His tyranny. He then goes to sleep on God's throne.

While Tulip and Jesse ride off into the sunset, it is revealed to the reader that God resurrected Cassidy as well (as a mortal), and the final page of the series shows Cassidy throwing away his sunglasses and vowing to "act like a man."

== Spin-offs ==
=== Saint of Killers ===
The "Saint of Killers" (art by Steve Pugh and Carlos Ezquerra) tells the origin of the Saint of Killers. Originally a retired gunfighter in the mold of William Munny, his wife and daughter were stricken with fever in their remote mountain cabin ten years after he gave up his life as a ruthless bounty hunter and murderer. His attempts to bring medicine to them were delayed by a gang of scalpers in the town of Ratwater, Texas, resulting in his family's death. He returns to Ratwater, but is killed before he can take his vengeance; finding himself in Hell, however, does nothing to quell his hatred, making him immune to the Devil's torture. The Angel of Death, in the area for a poker game and weary of his position, offers the gunfighter the job of Saint of Killers, under the command of none but God. He accepts and returns to Earth to take his revenge, though not before gunning down the Devil himself. The Saint kills every living being in Ratwater, including women and children, allowing his hatred and rage to consume him totally.

This entire sequence of events is later revealed to be the work of God, who put the outlaws in his way in order to turn his already intemperate disposition into the all-encompassing rage needed for a Saint of Killers.

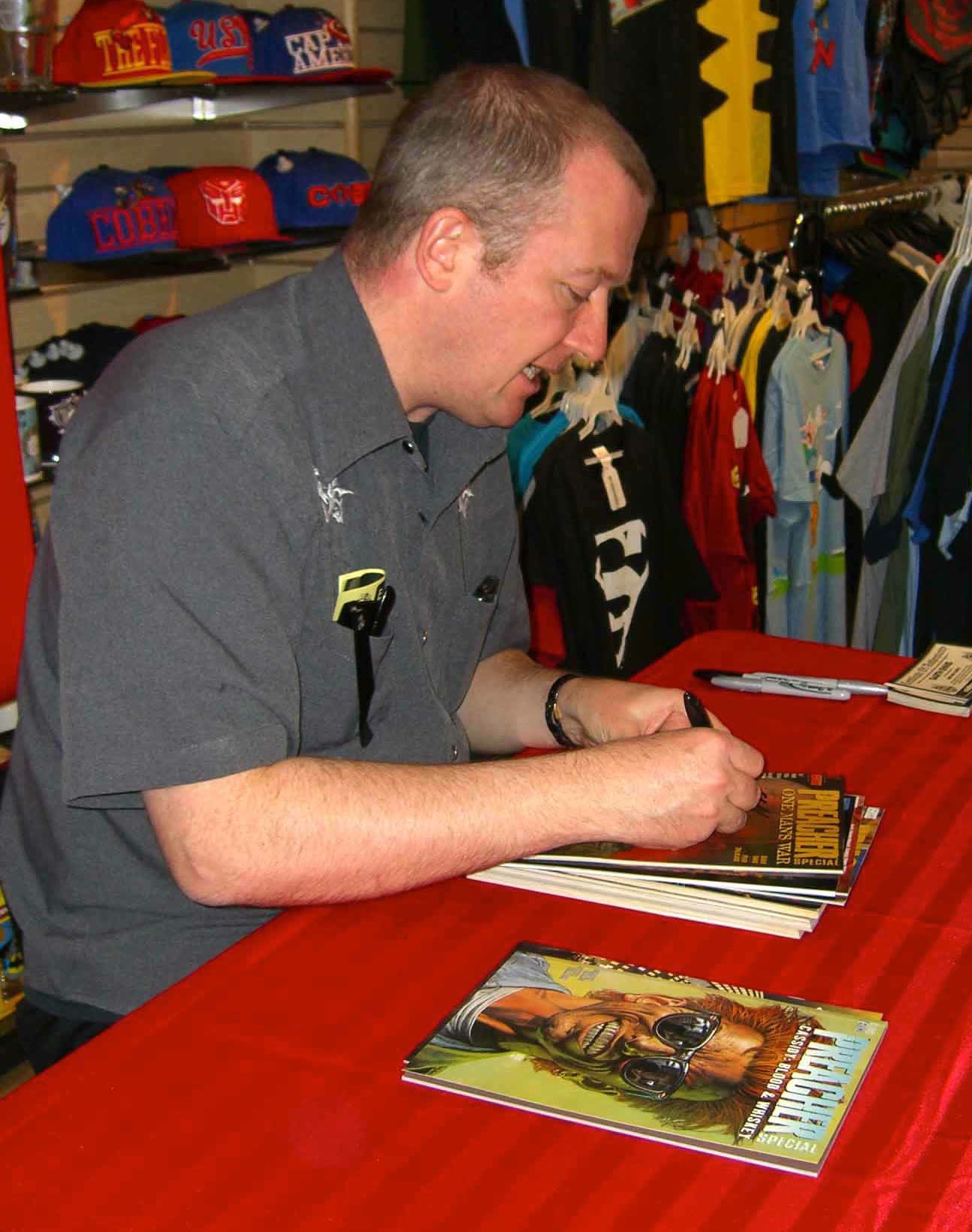
Writer Garth Ennis signing copies of Blood and Whiskey and One Man's War during an April 19, 2012 signing at Midtown Comics Downtown in Manhattan.

=== The Story of You-Know-Who ===
The Story of You-Know-Who (art by Richard Case) features the origin of Arseface, detailing the sadistic abuse he suffered at the hands of his father and the events leading up to Arseface's botched suicide attempt.

=== The Good Old Boys ===
The Good Old Boys is a tale starring Jody and T.C. from the "All in the Family" storyline. Art is by Carlos Ezquerra.

=== Cassidy: Blood and Whiskey ===
Cassidy: Blood and Whiskey tells the story of Cassidy's only encounter with another vampire who is worshipped by a New Orleans–based gothic cult, Les Enfants du Sang.

=== One Man's War ===
A story focusing on who Herr Starr is, where he came from, and how he got involved in the Grail conspiracy. (art by Peter Snejbjerg)

=== Tall in the Saddle ===
A tale of Jesse and Tulip's wild early experiments in car theft.
