= Sean Phillips =

British comic book artist (born 1965)

- Self-portrait of Phillips, shot in c. 2008
- Born: 27 January 1965 (age 61) United Kingdom
- Notable works: Hellblazer; Devlin Waugh; Sleeper; Marvel Zombies; Marvel Zombies 2 Criminal; Incognito; Fatale
- Collaborators: John Smith, Ed Brubaker
- Awards: 4x Eisner Award (2007, 2012, 2016, 2018)

Sean Phillips (born 27 January 1965) is a British comic book artist, best known for his collaborations with Ed Brubaker on comics including Sleeper, Incognito, the Criminal series of comics, Fatale, The Fade Out, and Kill or Be Killed.

He has also worked on the DC Comics' series WildC.A.T.s and Hellblazer.

== Early life ==
Phillips grew up in the U.K. fascinated by American comics, particularly those published by Marvel Comics. As he got older, his influences included Jim Baikie, Simon Bisley, Jamie Hewlett, Duncan Fegredo, Bill Sienkiewicz, Dave McKean, and Jaime Hernandez.

== Career ==
Phillips began his career in 1980 in British girls' comic magazines such as Bunty, Judy and Nikki while still at school. After graduating art college (Lowestoft Polytechnic) in 1988 he started working with John Smith on New Statesmen and Straitgate, as well as Pat Mills on Third World War, both at Crisis.

Phillips was part of the late-1980s British Invasion, getting work on Hellblazer before it became a Vertigo Comics title. Returning to the UK, he worked on Devlin Waugh for the Judge Dredd Megazine (May 2–15 1992 – Aug. 22–Sept. 4, 1992) and also provided the art on a number of series for 2000 AD, including Judge Dredd.

In 1990, he illustrated the cover for the Stereo MC's album Supernatural.

In May 1993 he became one of the early Vertigo Comics artists by illustrating (with assists from Paul Peart and Sean Harrison Scoffield) the entire 16-issue run of Kid Eternity (1993–1994). His later work with Vertigo included the covers for twenty-three of the twenty-five issues of the first The Invisibles series and also returning to Hellblazer (switching from artwork and covers to just covers after around twenty issues) between 1995 and 1998. He drew three issues of Shade, the Changing Man (1994), the one-shot Hell Eternal (1995), and the miniseries The Minx (1998–1999). Phillips penciled four issues of the final Invisibles series between 1999 and 2000, and produced covers for the Hellblazer Special: Bad Blood miniseries. In 1999, he inked Michael Lark's pencils on Scene of the Crime — written by Ed Brubaker, a writer Phillips would collaborate with a number of times over the following years. In 2001, Phillips and John Bolton illustrated a Vertigo three-issue miniseries called User, written by Devin Grayson. The series explores "sexual identity and online role-playing in the text-based MUDs of the nineties." User was re-released as a hardcover by Image in 2017.

Phillips moved on to Wildstorm for a long run on WildC.A.T.s (issues #8–28, 2000–2001) with Joe Casey before teaming up Brubaker on Sleeper (2003–2005).

Phillips went over to Marvel Comics in 2005 where he co-created Criminal with Brubaker at the Marvel imprint Icon Comics. He was also the main artist on the first two instalments of the Marvel Zombies series with Robert Kirkman.

Subsequent work includes Incognito, another series with Brubaker at Icon and a US reprint of 7 Psychopaths at Boom! Studios.

Phillips provided the art for The Criterion Collection release of the 1961 noir film Blast of Silence, as well as the art for the Criterion release of the 1957 legal drama 12 Angry Men, based on a design by Eric Skillman.

On 9 April 2011, Phillips was one of 62 comics creators who appeared at the IGN stage at the Kapow! Comic Convention in London to set two Guinness World Records, the Fastest Production of a Comic Book, and Most Contributors to a Comic Book. With Guinness officials on hand to monitor their progress, writer Mark Millar began work at 9 a.m. scripting a 20-page black and white Superior comic book, with Phillips and the other artists — including Dave Gibbons, Frank Quitely, John Romita Jr., Jock, Doug Braithwaite, Ian Churchill, Olivier Coipel, Duncan Fegredo, Simon Furman, David Lafuente, John McCrea, and Liam Sharp — all drawing a panel each, appearing on stage throughout the day to work on the pencils, inks, and lettering, with regular Superior artist Leinil Yu creating the book's front cover. The book was completed in 11 hours, 19 minutes, and 38 seconds, and was published through Icon on 23 November 2011, with all royalties being donated to Yorkhill Children's Foundation.

In 2012, Phillips was one of several artists to illustrate a variant cover for Robert Kirkman's The Walking Dead No. 100, which was released 11 July at San Diego Comic-Con.

Phillips and Ed Brubaker launched their Fatale series at Image Comics in January 2012. The series was initially announced as a twelve-issue maxi-series but was upgraded to an ongoing title in November 2012. Jesse Schedeen of IGN stated that "You can't go wrong with a Brubaker/Phillips collaboration. Even so, Fatale is making a strong case for being the best of their projects."

In October 2013, Phillips and Brubaker signed a five-year contract to produce comics exclusively for Image. Under the terms of the deal, Image will publish any comic they bring to them without having to pitch it to them first. In 2019, Brubaker and Phillips signed another five-year contract with Image to produce comics exclusively for that publisher. As Phillips explained, "[W]e get to do whatever we want! We don’t have to pitch projects to Image, we don’t have an editor or designer, we can make as many or few books as we want. We get to choose format, paper stock, and everything else to do with our books."

== Personal life ==
Phillips' son Jacob Phillips is also a professional comics creator, having worked as a colorist on his father's comics and branching out into illustrating his own series.

== Art style ==
Phillips is known for the different art styles he has employed over the years, from clean-line superhero work, to scratchy, noir-inspired black-and-line work, to painted comics.

== Bibliography ==
- New Statesmen (with John Smith):
  - "Downtime" (in Crisis, No. 5, 1988)
  - "Holding the fist" (in Crisis, No. 6, 1988)
  - "White Death" (in Crisis, #13–14, 1989)
- Third World War (with Pat Mills):
  - "Symphony of splintered wood" (in Crisis #22–23, 1989)
  - "Remembering Zion" (in Crisis No. 24, 1989)
  - "Book of Babylon" (in Crisis No. 27, 1989)
  - "The calling" (in Crisis No. 31, 1989)
  - "The man with the child in his eyes" (in Crisis #33–34, 1989)
- Straitgate (with John Smith, in Crisis, 1990)
- Hellblazer (Vertigo):
  - No. 31, 34–36 (with Jamie Delano, 1990)
  - "Counting To Ten" (with John Smith, Hellblazer No. 51, 1992)
  - "In Another Part of Hell" (with Jamie Delano, Hellblazer No. 84, 1994, collected in Rare Cuts, ISBN 1-4012-0240-3)
  - #84–88 (with Eddie Campbell, 1995)
  - #89–100, 102–107, 109-114, 116-120 (with Paul Jenkins, 1994–1997)
- Danzig's Inferno (with John Smith, in 2000 AD #718–719, 1991)
- Strange Cases:
  - "Feed Me" (with Warren Ellis, in Judge Dredd Megazine (vol. 1) No. 7, 1991)
  - "Magic" (with Ian Edginton, in Judge Dredd Megazine (vol. 1) No. 8, 1991)
- Armitage (with Dave Stone):
  - "Armitage" (in Judge Dredd Megazine (vol. 1) #9–14, 1991)
  - "The Case of the Detonating Dowager" (in Judge Dredd Yearbook 1993, 1992)
- Devlin Waugh (with John Smith, tpb, Swimming in Blood, 224 pages, 2004, DC, ISBN 1-4012-0392-2, Rebellion, ISBN 1-904265-17-0):
  - "Swimming in Blood" (in Judge Dredd Megazine (vol. 2) #1–9, 1992)
  - "A Love like Blood" (illustrated text story, in Judge Dredd Mega-Special 1993, 1993)
  - "Brief Encounter" (in Judge Dredd Megazine (vol. 2) No. 26, 1993)
  - "Body and Soul" (illustrated text story, in Judge Dredd Yearbook 1994, 1993)
- Judge Dredd:
  - "The Marshal" (with Garth Ennis, in 2000 AD #800–803, 1992)
  - "The Hunting Party" (with John Wagner, in 2000 AD #1033, 1997)
  - "A Death in the Family" (with John Wagner, in Judge Dredd Megazine (vol.3) No. 45, 1998)
- Harmony (in Judge Dredd Yearbook, 1994)
- Vector 13:
  - "Case Six: Marion" (with Dan Abnett, in 2000 AD No. 956, 1995)
  - "Case Two: It's Good to Talk" (with Nick Abadzis, in 2000 AD #1025, 1997)
- Sinister Dexter: "Sucker Punch" (with Dan Abnett, in 2000 AD #1115, 1998)
- Downlode Tales: "Tough Tushy" (with Dan Abnett, in 2000 AD #1126, 1999)
- Scene of the Crime #2–4 (inks, with Ed Brubaker and pencils by Michael Lark, Vertigo, 1999, collected in A Little Piece of Goodnight, 2000, ISBN 1-56389-670-2)
- WildC.A.T.s (with Joe Casey and Steve Dillon, Volume 2 #8–28, Wildstorm) collected as:
  - Vicious Circles (collects #8–13, 144 pages, 2001, ISBN 1-56389-761-X)
  - Serial Boxes (collects #14–19, 144 pages, 2001, ISBN 1-56389-766-0)
  - Battery Park (collects #20–28, 224 pages, 2004, ISBN 1-4012-0035-4)
- The Brotherhood #7–9 (with writer attributed as "X" and inks by Kent Williams, Marvel Comics, 2002)
- Sleeper (with Ed Brubaker, Wildstorm, two 12-issue limited series collected into four trade paperbacks):
  - Out in the Cold (2003, ISBN 1-4012-0115-6)
  - All False Moves (2004, ISBN 1-4012-0288-8)
  - A Crooked Line (2005, ISBN 1-4012-0618-2)
  - The Long Way Home (2005, ISBN 1-4012-0627-1)
- Black Widow: The Things They Say About Her (with Richard Morgan, 6-issue miniseries, Marvel, 2005–2006)
- Marvel Zombies (with Robert Kirkman, 5-issue limited series, Marvel Comics, 2006, tpb, 2006, ISBN 0-7851-2277-X)
- Criminal (with Ed Brubaker, ongoing series, Icon, 2006-ongoing) collected as:
  - Coward (2007, ISBN 0-7851-2439-X)
  - Lawless (2007, ISBN 0-7851-2816-6)
  - The Dead and the Dying (2008, ISBN 0-7851-3227-9)
  - Bad Night (2009, ISBN 0-7851-3228-7)
  - The Sinners (2010, ISBN 0-7851-3229-5)
- 7 Psychopaths (with Fabien Vehlmann, Delcourt, 2007, 88 pages, Boom! Studios, December 2010, ISBN 1-60886-032-9)
- Marvel Zombies 2 (with Robert Kirkman, 5-issue limited series, Marvel Comics, 2007–2008, hardcover, June 2008, ISBN 0-7851-2545-0)
- Incognito (with Ed Brubaker, 6-issue limited series, Icon, 2008–2009, tpb, November 2009, ISBN 0-7851-3979-6)
- Incognito: Bad Influences (with Ed Brubaker, 6-issue limited series, Icon, 2010–2011, tpb, 2011, ISBN 978-0-7851-5155-5
- Fatale (with Ed Brubaker, limited series, Image Comics, 2012-2014)
- The Fade Out (with Ed Brubaker, limited series, Image Comics, 2014-2015)
- Kill or Be Killed (with Ed Brubaker, Image Comics, 2016-2018)
- Pulp (with Ed Brubaker, Image Comics, 2020)
- Reckless (with Ed Brubaker, Image Comics, 2020-2022)
- Night Fever (with Ed Brubaker, Image Comics, 2023)
- Where the Body Was (with Ed Brubaker, Image Comics, 2024)
- Houses of the Unholy (with Ed Brubaker, Image Comics, 2024)

== Awards ==
=== Eisner Awards ===
==== Best Cover Artist ====
- 2017 nominated for Criminal 10th Anniversary Special, Kill or Be Killed

==== Best Limited Series or Story Arc ====
- 2016 Winner for The Fade Out (with Ed Brubaker)

==== Best Graphic Album—New ====
- 2018 Winner for My Heroes Have Always Been Junkies (with Ed Brubaker)

=== Other awards ===
- 1993 nominated for the UK Comic Art Award for Best Artist
- 2006 Winner of the Spike TV Scream Award for Best Artist for Marvel Zombies
- 2012 nominated for the Eagle Award for Favourite Artist: Fully Painted Artwork
- 2021 Nominated for the Dragon Award for Best Graphic Novel for Pulp (with Ed Brubaker and Jacob Phillips)

Preceded by Steve Dillon	Hellblazer artist 1994–1997	Succeeded by Warren Pleece
Preceded by Carlos Meglia	WildC.A.T.s artist 2000–2001	Succeeded by N/A
Preceded by N/A	Sleeper artist 2003–2005	Succeeded by N/A
Preceded by N/A	Criminal artist 2006–2007, 2008, 2009–2010, 2011, 2019–2020	Succeeded by N/A
Preceded by N/A	Fatale artist 2012–2014	Succeeded by N/A
Preceded by N/A	Kill or Be Killed artist 2016–2018	Succeeded by N/A
