= Sleeper (comics) =

DC Comics comic book series

- Sleeper, Volume 1, #1

Publication information
- Publisher: Wildstorm (imprint of DC Comics)
- Schedule: Monthly
- Format: Two limited series, one-shot
- Genre: Crime, spy, superhero, neo-noir
- Publication date: March 2003 - March 2004; April 2004; June 2004 - May 2005
- No. of issues: Sleeper #1-12; Coup D'Etat: Sleeper; Sleeper: Season Two #1-12
- Main character(s): Holden Carver; John Lynch; Tao; Miss Misery

Creative team
- Written by: Ed Brubaker
- Penciller(s): Sean Phillips (main series); Jim Lee (Coup D'Etat: Sleeper)
- Colorist(s): Tony Avina; Randy Mayor; Alex Sinclair; Carrie Strachan; James Sinclair

Collected editions
- Out in the Cold: ISBN 1-4012-0115-6
- All False Moves: ISBN 1401202888
- A Crooked Line: ISBN 1401206182
- The Long Way Home: ISBN 1401206271
- Sleeper: Season One: ISBN 1401223605
- Sleeper Season Two: ISBN 1401224938

Sleeper is a comic book series written by Ed Brubaker with art by Sean Phillips, published by DC Comics under their Wildstorm imprint. The series consisted of two twelve-issue limited series and the events of the first "season" served as a catalyst for the Coup d'etat line-wide crossover.

Sleeper was set in the Wildstorm Universe and concerned the travails of Holden Carver, a covert operative who has been placed undercover in a villainous organisation led by TAO, a WildC.A.T.s villain from Alan Moore's run. It was a spin-off of Point Blank, a mini-series about Grifter from Wildcats and John Lynch from Gen^{13} that was also written by Ed Brubaker.

== Plot ==
Holden Carver, also known as The Conductor (although he prefers going by his real name), is placed undercover in Tao's criminal organization by John Lynch, the director of International Operations after being fused with an alien artifact that makes him impervious to pain, gives him a powerful healing factor, and allows him to store pain he receives and pass it on to others through skin contact. Holden hates these abilities and constantly wishes to be rid of them. Lynch falls into a coma after being shot by Grifter, leaving Holden with no link to the outside world.

He quickly rises through the ranks of Tao's syndicate and becomes one of his lieutenants, called "Prodigals". He falls in love with another Prodigal named Miss Misery and befriends Genocide Jones, a super-strong, bullet-proof member of Tao's organization. The series also focuses on Holden's internal struggle over whether or not there is a difference between his actions while serving Tao and his actions while serving Lynch.

Tao learns of Holden's true allegiance, and Holden is forced to live on the run. With the help of Peter Grimm, his most trusted Prodigal, Tao captures Holden and tells him that he is a survivor, past petty concepts like "good" and "evil". Beginning to believe Tao and seeing no other options, Holden rejoins Tao's organization, this time as a true criminal. As Season One ends, John Lynch miraculously awakes from his coma.

Coup d'etat comes to pass and the members of Tao's organization are forced into hiding so the Authority cannot discover them. Holden is now a full-fledged villain and a trusted Prodigal. While on a mission with his own band of Torpedoes (lower-level members of Tao's organization) called the Hounds, consisting of the eager-to-please Pit Bull (introduced in Season One) and the werewolf Blackwolf, Holden is contacted by an agent of John Lynch. Lynch wants Holden to leave Tao and defect back to I.O. He later presents Holden with a member of the alien race who built the artifact that gave Holden his abilities and promises that if he agrees to come back he'll rid him of his powers.

Holden then begins to play both sides against the middle, hoping he will be able to free himself of his obligations to Tao and Lynch and run away with Miss Misery. As this goes on, he tries to reform, despite knowing that he will never again be the man he thought he was before falling in with Tao.

At the end of Season Two, Holden Carver is left in a vegetative state. Lynch uses his gen factor powers to make the vegetative Holden believe that he is finally retired and living with Miss Misery and his ex-fiancée, Veronica St. James, on a tropical island. Holden ripped out Tao's tongue as a last effort to 'disarm' the main villain of the series before being handed over to Lynch. It is here that the story ends.

== Collected editions ==
Sleeper has been collected in a series of four trade paperbacks:

- Sleeper: Season One (ISBN 1-4012-2360-5) collects:
  - Sleeper Vol. 1: Out in the Cold (collects Sleeper Season 1 #1–6, ISBN 1-4012-0115-6)
  - Sleeper Vol. 2: All False Moves (collects Sleeper Season 1 #7–12, ISBN 1-4012-0288-8)
- Sleeper: Season Two (ISBN 1-4012-2493-8) collects:
  - Sleeper Vol. 3: A Crooked Line (collects Sleeper Season 2 #1–6, ISBN 1-4012-0618-2)
  - Sleeper Vol. 4: The Long Way Home (collects Sleeper Season 2 #7–12, ISBN 1-4012-0627-1)
  - Coup D'état (collects Coup D'état #1 – Sleeper, ISBN 1-4012-0570-4)

== Film ==
Tom Cruise and Sam Raimi were in the process of creating a movie adaptation of Sleeper with Warner Bros., in which Cruise may have starred and Brad Inglesby was to write the screenplay; however, the project never came to fruition. In November 2013, the magazine Variety reported that Matt Damon, Ben Affleck and Jennifer Todd will produce the film and Shawn Ryan and David Wiener to pen the film.
