= Rubber Blanket =

Alternative comics anthology magazine

- Rubber Blanket #3 cover by David Mazzucchelli showcasing the story "Big Man"

Publication information
- Publisher: Rubber Blanket Press
- Schedule: Yearly
- Format: Deluxe oversized 9"x12"
- Genre: Alternative comics
- Publication date: 1991 – 1993
- No. of issues: 3
- Editor: David Mazzucchelli

Rubber Blanket was an alternative comics anthology magazine edited by the husband/wife team of cartoonist David Mazzucchelli and painter/colorist Richmond Lewis. It was self-published under the banner of Rubber Blanket Press in a deluxe, oversized format from 1991 to 1993 (three issues).

While an anthology of different artists, Rubber Blanket is mostly a showcase for Mazzucchelli's work. In it, he largely turns his back on the superhero work that had made him a fan-favorite, and moved towards a personal storytelling style with bold and more expressionistic artwork. These stories earned Mazzucchelli the 72nd position on The Comics Journal's list of the best comics of the 20th century.

== Publication history ==
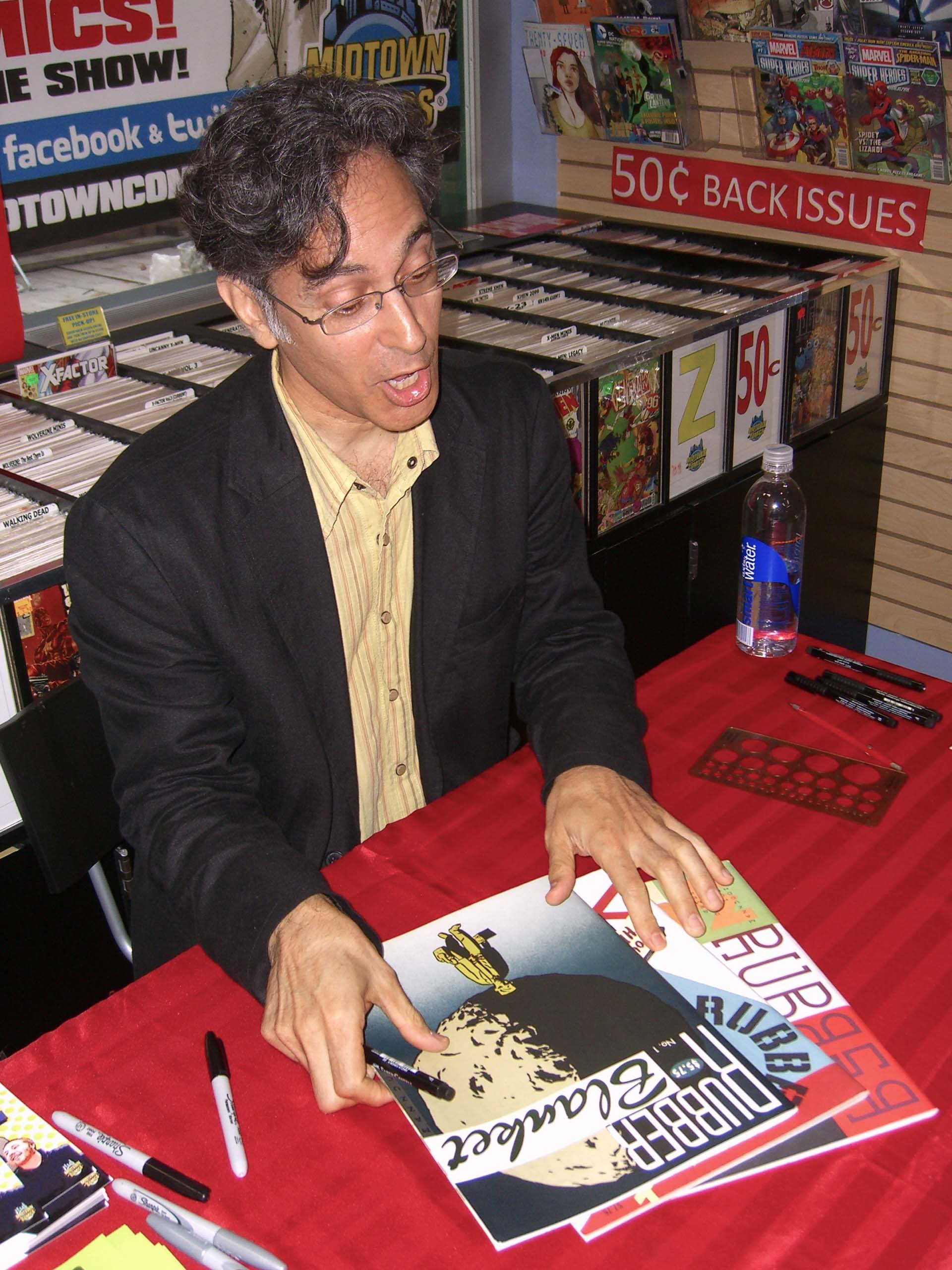
Mazzucchelli autographing copies of the series at a June 28, 2012 signing at Midtown Comics in Manhattan

Mazzucchelli had worked on a number of popular titles, including Batman: Year One for DC Comics and Daredevil for Marvel, when he abruptly left the world of superheroes (supposedly giving up an offer to draw the popular X-Men series) to make more personal works. He did not produce any commercial work for a year, and studied underground comix and children's books, and took printmaking classes.

In 1991 he published the first issue of the anthology Rubber Blanket in a deluxe, oversized format. Each issue was 9"x12", and was self-published by Mazzucchelli and Lewis under the imprint of Rubber Blanket Press, based in Hoboken, New Jersey. The name was taken from the rubber blanket used to transfer ink from the printing plates to the printing surface in offset printing. The title was meant to indicate that the printing process was integral to the work published therein.

Rubber Blanket was mainly a vehicle for Mazzucchelli to publish his more adventurous work, but it also showcased a few other artists' work: Ted Stearn's "Fuzz and Pluck", works by David Hornung, some work by Mazzucchelli's wife Richmond Lewis, and the beginning of a translation of the Italian "Happy Birthday, Signora" by Massimo Semerano and Francesca Ghermandi.

"Happy Birthday, Signora" was later continued in the Kim Thompson-edited Zero Zero from Fantagraphics, starting in issue #19, and renamed "Pop. 666". The chapter that was printed in Rubber Blanket #3 was reprinted in a new translation in Zero Zero #20, sometimes referring to the translation Mazzucchelli was involved with.

A fourth issue was never published, as Mazzucchelli had noticed that his stories were getting longer—from 9 pages to 24 and ultimately to 40 pages for "Big Man" in issue #3. Mazzucchelli wanted more space and wanted to dedicate the fourth issue to one long story. That story ended up being Asterios Polyp, which was published as a hardcover graphic novel by Pantheon Books in 2009.

== Issues ==
The stories in Rubber Blanket have never been collected in English. There have been foreign editions that have translated some of these stories in book form.

1. 1991, 48 pages
  - "Near Miss" (David Mazzucchelli)
  - "If it Weren't for Men..." (Richmond Lewis)
  - "Beyond the Last Pier" (art/story: Lewis; text/story: Mazzucchelli)
  - "Mope & Grope" (Mazzucchelli)
  - "Dead Dog" (Mazzucchelli)
2. 1992, 56 pages
  - "Blind Date" (Mazzucchelli)
  - "Pyrum Spoth's Theory Of Truth" (David Hornung)
  - "Mope & Grope" (Mazzucchelli)
  - "Smiling Joe" (Mazzucchelli)
  - "Discovering America" (Mazzucchelli)
  - "Beach Boy" (Ted Stearn)
  - "Air" (Mazzucchelli)
  - "Hey, I'm Serious" (Mazzucchelli)
3. 1993, 72 pages
  - "Mope & Grope" (Mazzucchelli)
  - "Life o' Bub" (Hornung)
  - "Mope & Grope" (Mazzucchelli)
  - "Happy Birthday, Signora" (Massimo Semerano & Francesca Ghermani)
    translated from Italian by Semerano, Ghermandi and Mazzucchelli
  - "Big Man" (Mazzucchelli)
    The longest story in Rubber Blanket, about a giant discovered washed up on the shore in a rural area.
    The story has been said to be "essentially a very well-crafted Incredible Hulk story", but Mazzucchelli says he had intended it as a fable-like story, and not a commentary on superhero stories.
  - "Fuzz & Pluck" (Stearn)
  - "The Death of Monsieur Absurde"" (Mazzucchelli)

== Reception ==
Rubber Blanket has received much praise, and reportedly made Rob Liefeld's "head blow off". All three issues are long sold out and highly sought after by collectors at high prices.

"The short stories in Rubber Blanket by David Mazzucchelli" ranked #72 on The Comics Journal's list of the best comics of the 20th century.

== See also ==
- Paul Auster's City of Glass
- Raw
