= Fritzi Ritz =

American comic strip

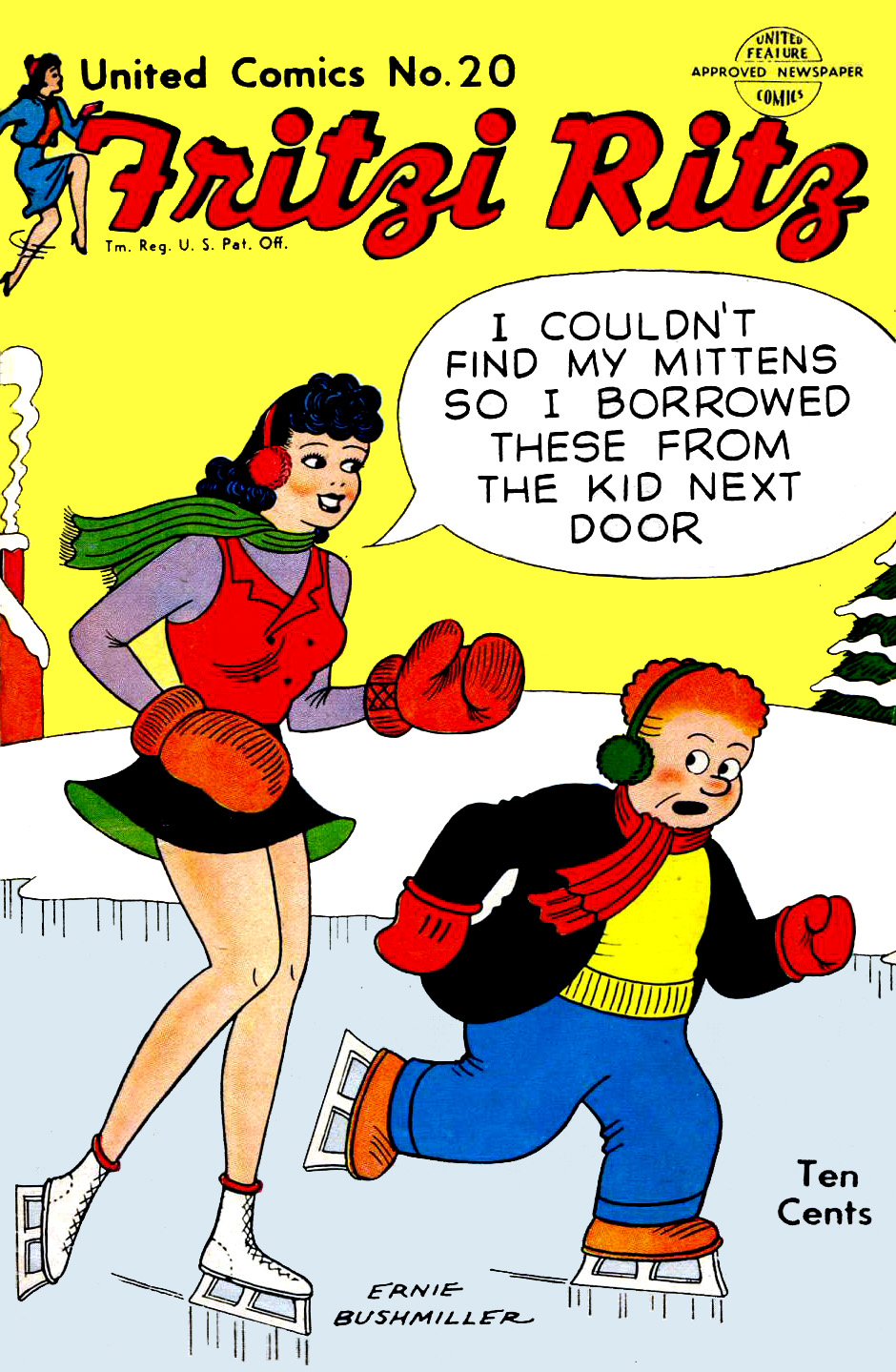
- Fritzi Ritz (January 1952)
- Authors: Larry Whittington (1922–1925); Ernie Bushmiller (1925–1967)
- Current status/schedule: Concluded
- Launch date: October 9, 1922 (dailies); October 6, 1929 (Sundays)
- End date: October 23, 1938 (dailies); September 24, 1967 (Sundays)
- Syndicates: World Feature Service (1922–1931); United Feature Syndicate (1931–1968)
- Genre(s): Humor, gag-a-day, satire, children, adults
- Followed by: Nancy

Fritzi Ritz is an American comic strip created in 1922 by Larry Whittington. In 1925, the strip was taken over by Ernie Bushmiller and, in 1938, the daily strip evolved into the popular Nancy. The Sunday edition of the strip, begun by Bushmiller in 1929, continued until 1967.

== Publication history ==
Distributed by United Feature Syndicate, Fritzi Ritz began October 9, 1922, in the New York Evening World. Whittington left after three years, and starting May 14, 1925, 20-year-old Bushmiller stepped in as his replacement, eventually modeling Fritzi after his fiancée, Abby Bohnet, whom he married in 1930. In 1931, when the Evening World and the New York Telegram merged, Fritzi Ritz was briefly without a paper in New York City until it was picked up on January 10, 1932, by the New York Daily Mirror.

== Characters and story ==
- Fritzi Ritz was initially portrayed as a flapper, whose main concerns were men, clothes, cosmetics, and money. This is a far cry from her more-familiar image as Nancy's level-headed, responsible guardian. In one 1920s strip, she says she is 19 years old. In later decades she appears to be in her late twenties or early thirties. She states in the December 3, 1930, strip that she was born in New York. Beginning in 1923, and until 1932, Fritzi worked as an actress.
- George Ritz is Fritzi's father.
- Mr. Blobbs, a short plump man with glasses, was Fritzi's boss when she worked as an actress. He was a sometimes cheap but nice guy. Blobbs' last appearance was in May 1932.
- Nancy Ritz, Fritzi's niece, first appeared on January 2, 1933 as a houseguest and eventually overtook the strip. During the 1930s, it is mentioned at least twice that Fritzi and Nancy live in New York City, though it is uncertain whether that means Manhattan or another borough. It is mentioned during the 1935 continuity when Nancy runs away from home and winds up at an Indian reservation. After that period, their city of residence is never mentioned again.
- Phil Fumble, inspired by Ernie Bushmiller's own appearance, originally had his own strip, but became Fritzi's boyfriend for several decades.
- Sluggo Smith had been added in January 1938 as Nancy's friend.

When Bushmiller died, the Nancy strip was taken over by Mark Lasky (dailies) and Al Plastino (Sundays). Both kept the strip and Fritzi much as Bushmiller had left her. When Jerry Scott took over the dailies following the death of Lasky, he gradually reduced Fritzi's appearances until, by the time he took over the Sundays as well, she was reduced to only an off-panel voice, at most.

When Guy Gilchrist and his brother Brad took over, they re-introduced Fritzi, increasing her visibility to the point where she was equally prominent with Nancy herself. They also re-introduced Phil Fumble, an early boyfriend of Fritzi's, and the final strip of Gilchrist's run saw Phil and Fritzi getting married.

Writer/artist Olivia Jaimes rebooted Nancy, bringing it back to the status quo of the late Bushmiller era, albeit with a focus on modern tech. Fritzi is once again the unmarried guardian of Nancy, making regular appearances. In the June 16, 2026 Nancy strip, writer/artist Caroline Cash depicted Fritzi as bisexual.

== Daily strip ==
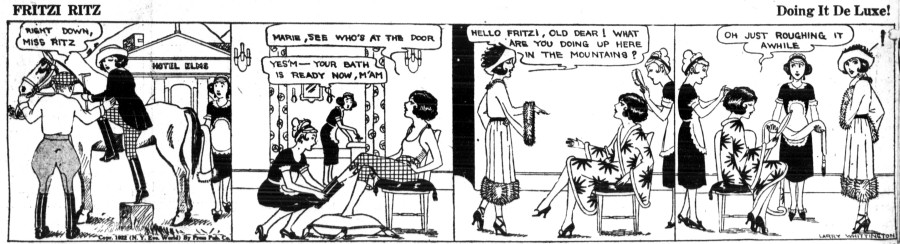
The first Fritzi Ritz strip

The Fritzi Ritz daily strip began Monday, October 9, 1922. In the early strips, Fritzi lived with her father and her Aunt Evelyn (who would eventually be retconned into her mother), with her father being the most commonly seen. She had a regular boyfriend, Ted Nichols (who was poor) and fended off the attentions of Bobby Bonds (who was rich). Fritzi began working at Star Studios in April 1923. Most of the 1920s gags took place at work, either in the studio or on location shooting at the beach, the mountains, in the country, or at a farm. In 1925, Larry Whittington left the strip to create another, Mazie the Model (syndicated by King Features). In May of that year, Bushmiller took over the strip, and Fritzi eventually began dating a new regular boyfriend, Wally.

By 1927, her mother had disappeared completely; her father, however, appeared until the mid-1930s. The workplace gags seemed to diminish by the early 1930s, and the strip took place more around the house and neighborhood. During the 1931-32 period, Fritzi's cousin James appeared. He was about ten years old and usually had a mean scowl on his face. Bushmiller was attempting to pair Fritzi with a child, but James did not catch on. Bushmiller struck gold when he tried again, introducing Nancy in January 1933.

Nancy made her first appearance in the January 2, 1933 daily strip as a houseguest. There was never a sequence of episodes exploring Fritzi's adoption of Nancy or what happened to Nancy's parents; she just seemed to appear as Fritzi's niece and gradually was seen more and more often throughout the 1930s. The first week of Nancy's appearance in January 1933 has Nancy addressing Fritzi like a sister, not "Aunt" Fritzi. However, very quickly Nancy shows respect to her aunt. Sluggo Smith is introduced in the dailies in January 1938 and at first Fritzi does not get along with him, venting at Nancy over his uncouth manners. Gradually she warms to him and there is never any friction between the two characters after that; in fact, there are not very many scenes involving just Fritzi and Sluggo in the Sunday Nancy comics or the dailies.

Occasionally, Fritzi's rich Uncle Zack appeared, though he only lasted a few years in the mid-1930s. It was rare for Fritzi's father and her boss to appear together; also rare for her father and uncle to appear together as well.

Bushmiller's dailies during the mid-to-late 1930s and early 1940s involved a lot of continuity, as opposed to the gag-a-day format that would come to dominate the rest of Bushmiller's run. There is a lot of sight humor but the strip is much wordier with elements involving mystery, pathos, and melodramatic aspects that are almost completely missing from the current version, and which were almost non-existent during the 1950s-70s strips.

In one 1939 daily sequence, it appears as if Fritzi may be getting married.

== Sunday strip ==
The Fritzi Ritz Sunday page began October 6, 1929. On Sunday, December 20, 1931, Phil Fumble was added as a separate Sunday, approximately 1/4 of the full page. Nancy, who first appeared in the Fritzi dailies in January 1933, appeared sporadically in the Fritzi Ritz Sundays as well. Sometime around the middle of 1933 the Phil Fumble Sunday and the Fritzi Ritz Sunday were reformatted so each took up one half of a full Sunday page. Through the 1930s, Nancy began to overtake Fritzi's world and in late 1938, Nancy began as a separate Sunday, and Phil Fumble, losing his own strip, began appearing in the Fritzi Ritz Sundays. Fritzi's previous boyfriend, Wally, had ceased appearing in 1937.

Bushmiller ceased drawing the Sundays in the late 1940s. Later Fritzi Sundays were drawn by various ghost artists, such as Bernard "Dib" Dibble and Al Plastino, who would eventually officially take over the Nancy Sundays following the death of Bushmiller.

== Comic books ==
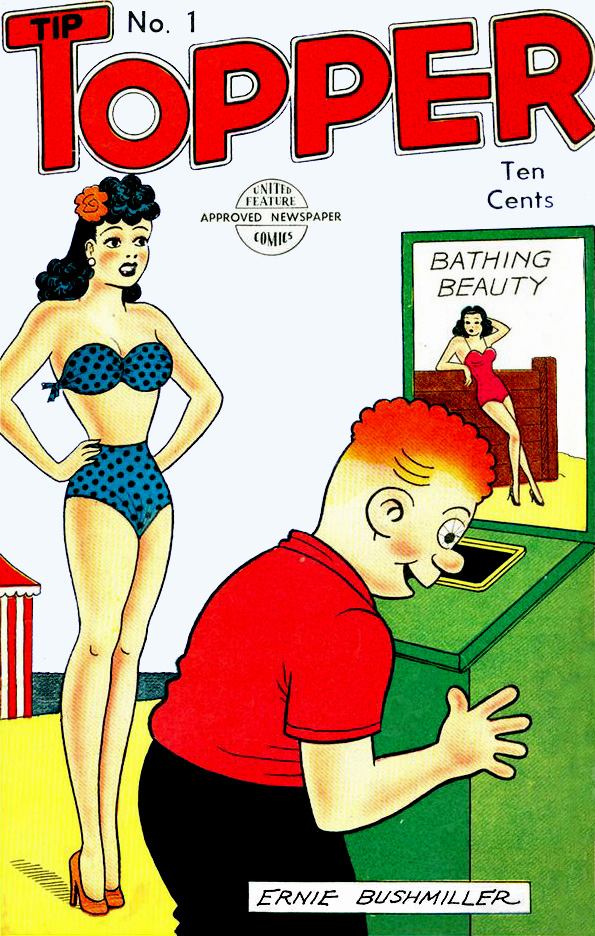
Fritzi and Phil on the cover of Tip Topper no. 1 (October, 1949). Art by Ernie Bushmiller.

Fritzi Ritz appeared in a number of comic books published by United Feature Syndicate (a few titles were continued by St. John Publications and then Dell Comics). Some of the comic book covers, especially in the 1940s, were drawn by Bushmiller himself. As the 1950s progressed, Bushmiller ceased drawing comic book covers.

- Comics on Parade
- Fritzi Ritz
- Nancy
- Nancy and Sluggo
- Single Series #5
- Sparkle Comics
- Sparkler Comics
- Tip Top Comics
- Tip Topper Comics
- United Comics

== Books ==
- Walker, Brian. The Best of Ernie Bushmiller's Nancy, 1988. Includes history of Fritzi Ritz from 1922.
- Thompson, Kim, editor. Nancy Is Happy: Complete Dailies, 1943-1945. Introduction by Daniel Clowes.

== Other media ==
Fritzi did not appear in either of the Nancy shorts produced by Terrytoons studio in the 1940s, but she did make occasional appearances in the Nancy segments made for Archie's TV Funnies in 1971.
