= Nancy (comic strip) =

American comic strip launched in 1938

- Nancy (June 5, 1960)
- Authors: Ernie Bushmiller (1938–1982); Al Plastino (1982–1984); Mark Lasky (1982–1983); Jerry Scott (1983–1995); Guy and Brad Gilchrist (1995–2018); Olivia Jaimes (2018–2025); Caroline Cash (2026–present)
- Current status/schedule: Running
- Launch date: October 30, 1938; 87 years ago (title changed from Fritzi Ritz)
- Syndicate(s): United Feature Syndicate / United Media / Andrews McMeel Syndication
- Genre(s): Surreal humor, gag-a-day, satire, slice of life
- Preceded by: Fritzi Ritz

Nancy

Publication information
- First appearance: January 2, 1933; 93 years ago
- Voiced by: Judy Stahr (1942); Jane Webb (1971)

In-story information
- Supporting character of: Fritzi Ritz (aunt)

Nancy is an American comic strip, originally written and drawn by Ernie Bushmiller and distributed by United Feature Syndicate and Andrews McMeel Syndication. Its origins lie in Fritzi Ritz, a strip Bushmiller inherited from its creator Larry Whittington in 1925. After Fritzi's niece Nancy was introduced in 1933, Fritzi Ritz evolved to focus more and more on Nancy instead of Fritzi. The new strip took the old one's daily slot, while Fritzi Ritz continued as a Sunday comic, with Nancy taking the Sunday slot previously filled by Bushmiller's Phil Fumble strip beginning on October 30, 1938.

== History ==
=== 1922 to 1925 ===
The character of Nancy, a precocious eight-year-old, first appeared in the strip Fritzi Ritz, a comic about a professional actress and her family and friends.

Larry Whittington began Fritzi Ritz in 1922, but the character of Nancy did not appear until 1933.

=== 1925 to 1982 ===
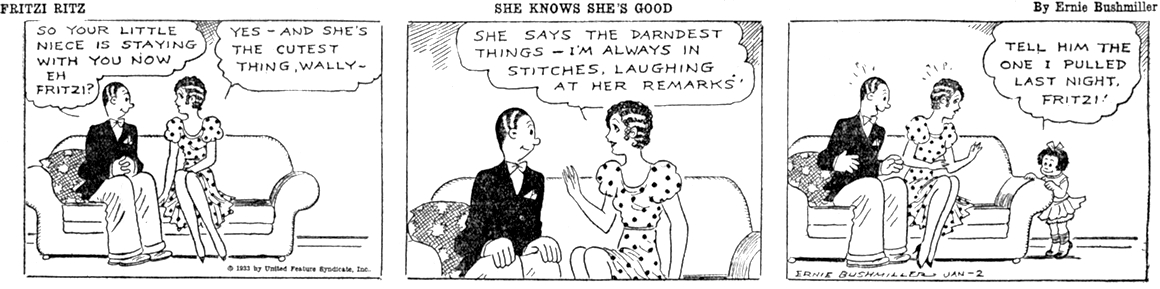
The first appearance of Nancy in a Fritzi Ritz comic strip on January 2, 1933

Fritzi Ritz was taken over by Bushmiller three years later in 1925, and on January 2, 1933, Bushmiller introduced Fritzi's niece, Nancy. In 1949, he was quoted as saying that he originally intended Nancy "just as an incidental character and I planned to keep her for about a week and then dump her ... But the little dickens was soon stealing the show and Bushmiller, the ingrate, was taking all the bows."

Nancy became the focus of the daily strip, which was renamed for her in 1938 after Lawrence W. Hager, the editor of the Owensboro, Kentucky Inquirer-Messenger (now the Messenger-Inquirer), lobbied for the change; Sluggo Smith, Nancy's friend from the "wrong side of the tracks" had been introduced earlier that year, and the strip's popularity rose. Comics historian Don Markstein ascribed the strip's success to Bushmiller's "bold, clear art style, combined with his ability to construct a type of gag that appealed to a very broad audience."

Fritzi Ritz became a secondary character, although her solo strip continued as a Sunday-only strip, where her relationship with Phil Fumble (who'd been featured in his own Sunday topper strip since 1932) was an ongoing presence until his departure in 1968. Fritzi Ritz continued as a Sunday feature (with Nancy as a topper) until that year when it too was replaced with Nancy permanently. At its peak in the 1970s, Nancy ran in more than 880 newspapers, before falling to 79 shortly before Guy Gilchrist's departure from the strip in 2018.

=== 1982 to 1984 ===
After Bushmiller's death in 1982, the strip was produced by different writers and artists. Bushmiller's editor Mark Lasky took over as the strip's artist and writer. He had previously worked on other comic strips, including Mell Lazarus's Miss Peach and Momma. After less than a year, however, Lasky died of cancer; there was no gap in Nancy publication, as Lasky had prepared enough strips to run for two more months, during which publishers were able to arrange for Jerry Scott to succeed Lasky. Al Plastino worked on Sunday episodes of Nancy from 1982 to 1984 after Bushmiller died.

=== 1983 to 1995 ===
The daily strip was handed to Jerry Scott in 1983 and the Sunday in 1985. Scott gradually started to draw the strip in a much different, more modern style than other incarnations. In an interview in 2024, Scott said that he had never been an enthusiast of Nancy and only accepted the job as a way of breaking in to the newspaper strip industry, so after about a year he felt burnt out on imitating Bushmiller's style and wanted to try his own approach. In 1994, the syndicate sought a replacement for Scott; applicants included Ivan Brunetti and Gary Hallgren.

=== 1995 to 2018 ===
In 1995, Guy and Brad Gilchrist were given control of the strip; Guy Gilchrist subsequently became the sole writer and illustrator. Although Gilchrist said Bushmiller's work was "always my inspiration," the strip's tone changed again over time. Gilchrist, a born-again Christian, incorporated Christian messaging into Nancy and reintroduced Phil Fumble as a worker at a local interfaith mission.

After 22 years, Gilchrist's last Nancy strip came out on February 18, 2018, which involved the marriage between Fritzi Ritz and Phil Fumble.

=== 2018 to 2025 ===
The strip resumed on April 9 with a "21st-century female perspective" by Olivia Jaimes (a pen name), the strip's first female creator. At the time of the announcement, 75 newspapers still ran the strip. Jaimes said, "Nancy has been my favorite sassy grouch for a long time. I'm excited to be sassy and grouchy through her voice instead of just mine" and "the Nancy I know and love is a total jerk and also gluttonous and also has big feelings and voraciously consumes her world". Comics historian Tom Spurgeon described Jaimes as funny and talented, with an approach to the character that both breaks with and pays homage to Bushmiller's version.

In the process, Jaimes updated the content of the strip. The September 3, 2018, strip spawned an Internet meme, depicting Nancy riding a hoverboard using two phones, one of which was attached to a selfie stick, and proclaiming that "Sluggo is lit." Jaimes described her aim with that strip to "most upset the person who likes me the least ... somebody who's like, 'Nancy sucks now' ... what I imagine my greatest hater would despise most is Nancy interacting with every piece of technology using words you don't understand." Jaimes' art style was visually distinct from that of Gilchrist. In particular, Jaimes drew Aunt Fritzi less like her original pin-up-style design, instead depicting her in a style similar to the other characters in the strip. She also modernized the setting, with frequent references to current trends and technologies, such as smartphones, social media, ear buds, and a robotics club.

In May 2024 Jaimes announced that she would take 'a temporary break' from Nancy, and that a series of guest artists would take the strip on for limited periods. The first artist to do so was Leigh Luna, starting with a Sunday page on June 23, 2024. The second was Shaenon K. Garrity, starting with a strip on Monday, July 8, 2024. The third was Caroline Cash, starting with a strip on Monday, July 22, 2024. The fourth was Megan McKay, starting with a strip on Monday, August 12, 2024. Jaimes resumed working on Nancy on Monday, September 2, 2024.

On September 15, 2025, after a week of re-run strips created by Bushmiller, Jaimes announced that she was stepping down from writing and drawing Nancy, and that Caroline Cash would be taking over the strip on January 1, 2026. A farewell strip from Jaimes ran on December 31.

=== 2026 to present ===
Caroline Cash took over the strip from January 1, 2026. Writing for Prospect, Frank M Young describes Cash's first month on the strip as "vibrant, authentic, edgy" and that "her Nancy teeters between crowd-pleasing and shocking." In a June 2026 storyline, Fritzi says she is bisexual, and starts dating Phil Fumble's cousin Phylis Fumble.

=== Summary ===
Daily credits:

- Larry Whittington: October 9, 1922 – May 1925 (as Fritzi Ritz)
- Ernie Bushmiller: May 14, 1925 – August 1982 (initially as Fritzi Ritz)
- Mark Lasky: August 29, 1982 – July 9, 1983 (Lasky's first signed strip appeared on October 11, 1982)
- Unknown artist: July 11, 1983 – October 8, 1983
- Jerry Scott: October 10, 1983 – September 2, 1995
- Guy (and Brad) Gilchrist: September 4, 1995 – February 17, 2018
- Olivia Jaimes: April 9, 2018 – September 1, 2025 (Jaimes's last strip appeared on December 31, 2025)
- Guest artists: June 23, 2024 – August 31, 2024 (Leigh Luna, Shaenon K. Garrity, Caroline Cash, Megan McKay)
- Caroline Cash: January 1, 2026 – present

Sunday credits:

- Ernie Bushmiller: October 6, 1929 – August 1982 (initially as Fritzi Ritz)
- Al Plastino: November 21, 1982 – December 30, 1984 (Plastino's first signed strip appeared on November 28, 1982)
- Jerry Scott: January 6, 1985 – August 27, 1995
- Guy (and Brad) Gilchrist: September 3, 1995 – February 18, 2018
- Olivia Jaimes: May 6, 2018 – August 31, 2025
- Guest artists: June 24, 2024 – September 1, 2024 (Leigh Luna, Shaenon K. Garrity, Caroline Cash, Megan McKay)
- Caroline Cash: January 4, 2026 – present

== Art styles ==
The artists who followed Bushmiller drew in a range of styles that deviated distinctly from his deceptively simple approach. Despite the changes in art style over the years, however, it is Bushmiller's work that is still most closely identified with the strip.

Bushmiller refined and simplified his drawing style over the years to create a uniquely stylized comic world. The American Heritage Dictionary of the English Language illustrates its entry on comic strip with a Nancy cartoon. Despite the small size of the reproduction, both the art and the gag are clear, and an eye-tracking survey once determined that Nancy was so conspicuous that it was the first strip most people viewed on a newspaper comics page.

In a 1988 essay, "How to Read Nancy", Mark Newgarden and Paul Karasik offered a probing analysis of Bushmiller's strip:

To say that Nancy is a simple gag strip about a simple-minded snot-nosed kid is to miss the point completely. Nancy only appears to be simple at a casual glance. Like architect Mies van der Rohe, the simplicity is a carefully designed function of a complex amalgam of formal rules laid out by the designer. To look at Bushmiller as an architect is entirely appropriate, for Nancy is, in a sense, a blueprint for a comic strip. Walls, floors, rocks, trees, ice-cream cones, motion lines, midgets and principals are carefully positioned with no need for further embellishment. And they are laid out with one purpose in mind—to get the gag across. Minimalist? Formalist? Structuralist? Cartoonist!

Comics theorist Scott McCloud described the essence of Nancy:

Ernie Bushmiller's comic strip Nancy is a landmark achievement: A comic so simply drawn it can be reduced to the size of a postage stamp and still be legible; an approach so formulaic as to become the very definition of the "gag-strip"; a sense of humor so obscure, so mute, so without malice as to allow faithful readers to march through whole decades of art and story without ever once cracking a smile. Nancy is Plato's playground. Ernie Bushmiller didn't draw A tree, A house, A car. Oh, no. Ernie Bushmiller drew the tree, the house, the car. Much has been made of the "three rocks." Art Spiegelman explains how a drawing of three rocks in a background scene was Ernie's way of showing us there were some rocks in the background. It was always three. Why? Because two rocks wouldn't be "some rocks." Two rocks would be a pair of rocks. And four rocks was unacceptable because four rocks would indicate "some rocks" but it would be one rock more than was necessary to convey the idea of "some rocks." A Nancy panel is an irreduceable concept, an atom, and the comic strip is a molecule.

Cartoonist Wally Wood described Nancy's design more succinctly: "By the time you decided not to read it, you already had."

== Characters ==
=== Primary characters ===
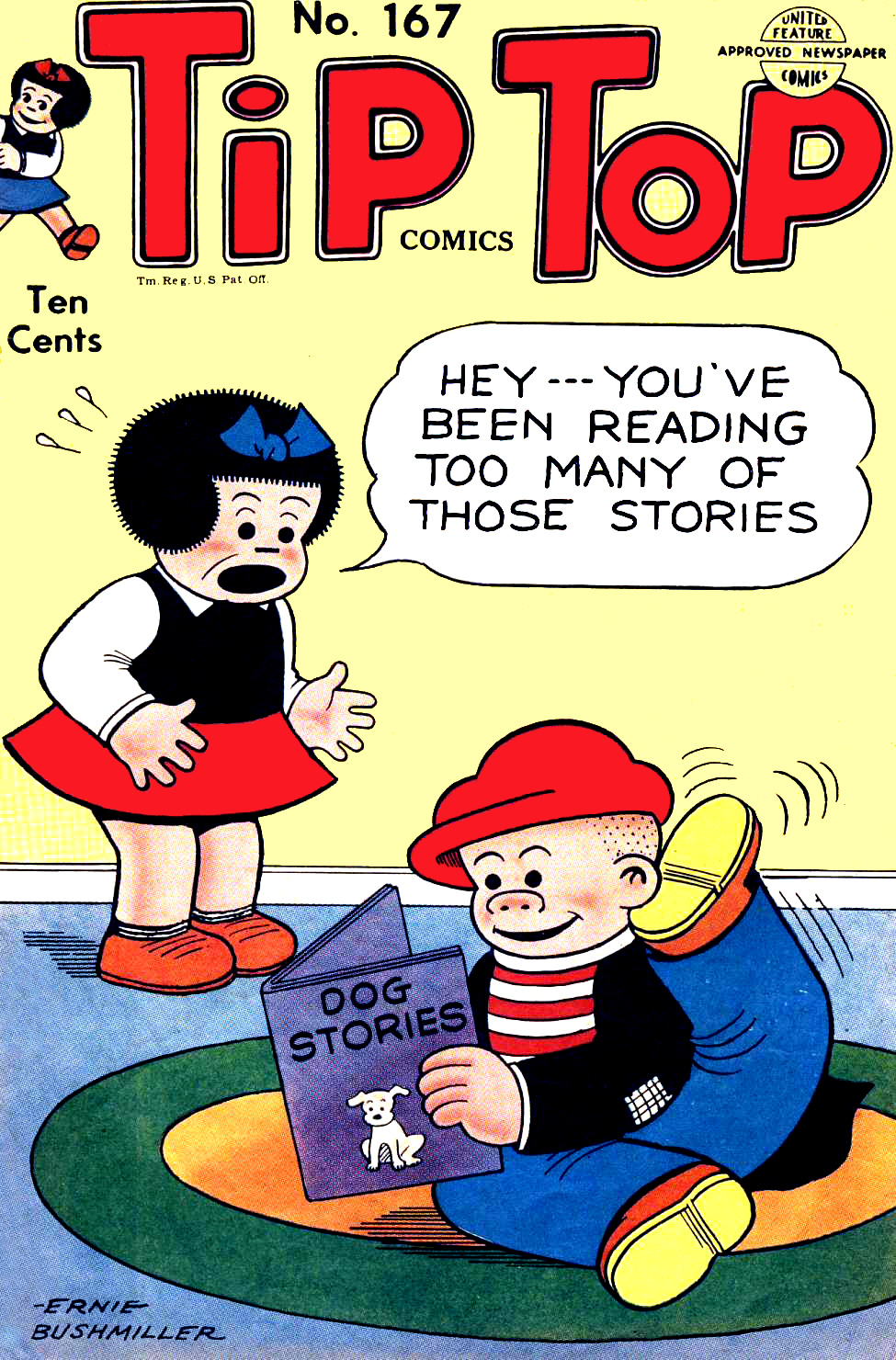
Nancy and Sluggo on the cover of Tip Top number 167 (May 1951). Ernie Bushmiller's distinctive line-work was instantly recognizable.

- Nancy Ritz, a typical and somewhat mischievous eight-year-old girl. She encourages her friend Sluggo to improve himself and is instantly jealous of any other girls who pay attention to him. During Gilchrist's run, she was portrayed as living in Three Rocks, Tennessee (a suburb of Nashville) although her home town was unspecified by other artists. Bushmiller located her home as 220 Oak Street next to Elm Avenue. She attends Central Elementary School in the Jaimes version. Aside from creating Nancy as Fritzi's niece, Bushmiller claimed to know nothing about her lineage, adding 'Very occasionally, I get curious kids asking me, but I don't know what to tell them.'
- Fritzi Ritz, Nancy's paternal aunt, with whom she lives. When Nancy initially appeared in the Fritzi Ritz comic strip, Fritzi was living with her father, George. She is a former movie actress. The Fritzi character was gradually phased out in the mid-1980s before being dropped entirely by the end of the decade but returned as a main character in 1995 when the strip was taken over by brothers Brad and Guy Gilchrist. In the current version of Nancy, Fritzi acts as Nancy's full-time carer.
- Sluggo Smith, Nancy's best friend, introduced in 1938. Sluggo is Nancy's age and is a poor ragamuffin-type from the wrong side of the tracks. He has sometimes been described as Nancy's boyfriend and indeed the GoComics website features an article describing Nancy and Sluggo's relationship as 'a romance for the ages.' He has often been portrayed as lazy, and his favourite pastime seems to be napping; in 1976 Bushmiller told a reporter who asked how Sluggo supported himself: "I assume he delivers groceries on Saturday, or something like that." In the Gilchrist version, Sluggo lives at 720 Drabb Street in an abandoned house he found and according to a storyline in 2013 strips, is taken care of by truck driver "uncles" Les and More, who discovered that he had lived in an orphanage; his mother died after he was born, and his father died serving his country. Sluggo's Uncle Vince is shady and his rich Aunt Maggie in California doesn't care about him because he reminds her of when she was poor. Gilchrist's Sluggo ran away from the orphanage, his cousin Chauncey gave him $200 and he took the train as far as Three Rocks. Jaimes' version of Sluggo is very different: he is thoughtful, a dedicated reader, and his living conditions are not shown. There is also very little to suggest that he is Nancy's boyfriend in the Jaimes version of the strip, although they are often seen in conversation together and Sluggo is anxious to please Nancy.

=== Secondary characters ===
- Agnes and Lucy, Nancy's identical twin friends in the Jaimes and Cash versions. Agnes, the more wily twin, wears her hair down, and Lucy, the more idealistic and artistic twin, wears her hair up.
- Amal, Magnet School student who was opposing team captain during a basketball competition (Jaimes version).
- Art camp counselor, an unnamed character in the Jaimes version, who is a very physically fit art teacher.
- Dae-hyun: "Dae-hyun was first introduced in the [May 16, 2020] Nancy. He is a student at the Magnet School who also works as an announcer. His hobbies are studying and skateboarding. His favorite food is pizza." (Jaimes version).
- Derek, the number one socializer at the Magnet School (Jaimes version).
- Devon P., Robotics Competition opponent from North Elementary School (Jaimes version).
- Estella, new Robotics Club member in the Jaimes version, a tech whiz who loves cute and small things (e.g., robots, puppies, tourbillons, Poochie, bows, Esther's grumpiness, etc.).
- Esther, a girl in Nancy's class in the Jaimes version. Introduced in 2018, she has a patchy relationship with Nancy.
- Grandma, Nancy's grandmother in the Jaimes version.
- Irma, a friend of Nancy's.
- Jerome, Magnet School student who writes poignant short stories (Jaimes version).
- Judy, Nancy's cousin who looks like her.
- Leon, Magnet School student (Jaimes version).
- Lyle, a blonde male classmate of Nancy's in the Jaimes version, who nearly always wears sandals with socks, regardless of the weather.
- Marigold, Sluggo's tomboy cousin.
- Melissa Bangles, one of Nancy's teachers in the Jaimes version, who had thwarted hopes of a basketball career.
- Mildred, originally Esther's and then also Nancy's rival in the Jaimes version. She used to go to a nearby magnet school that Esther used to also attend. She now attends Central Elementary and is in Nancy's math class.
- Nita, Nancy's math and robotics teacher, a character in the Jaimes version whose internal monologue often reflects on the difficulty and rewards of teaching.
- Nosey Rosey, a schoolmate of Nancy's who is always secretly curious about and spying on others she is around, much to the annoyance of Nancy.
- Old man, an unnamed character in the Jaimes version, a cranky oldster who has been affectionately dubbed "Ernest Dangit" by some fans.
- Oona Goosepimple, the spooky-looking child who lives in a haunted house down the road from Nancy's house. She originally appeared only in the comic book version of the strip, during John Stanley's tenure in the late 1950s and early 1960s. She appeared in the actual comic strip for the first time on October 16, 2013. Oona has also made one appearance in the Olivia Jaimes' version of Nancy.
- Pee Wee, a neighborhood toddler who is known for his extreme literalness.
- Phil Fumble, Fritzi's boyfriend. When Nancy debuted in the Fritzi Ritz comic strip, Fritzi had a procession of boyfriends, such as "Wally". Phil Fumble was the subject of his own strip by Bushmiller. He was written out in 1968 but made a reappearance in the November 27, 2012, strip, and became a regular character as of early January 2013, with the intention of furthering his relationship with Aunt Fritzi. Phil and Fritzi married in Gilchrist's last strip. This character did not appear in Jaimes' version of the strip, and though has not appeared in Cash's version has been referenced with his cousin "Phylis" first appearing in the strip on June 18, 2026.
- Phylis Fumble, Phil Fumble's cousin from the Cash version of the strip.
- Poochie, Nancy's dog (white with a large black spot on its back and black ears). A white dog with a black patch on its back and one black ear, identified by Nancy as hers, first appeared in the strip on January 13, 1933, however this dog was known as 'Woofy'. Poochie was first seen in the Jaimes version of the strip on June 27, 2018, although she was not mentioned by name in the Jaimes version until September 23, 2019. Poochie is regarded by Nancy and Fritzi as foolish, but she often outsmarts them.
- Pussycat, Nancy's adopted stray cat, who does not currently appear in the Jaimes version of the strip. Nancy first attempted to adopt an (unnamed) cat on January 18, 1933.
- Rollo Haveall, the stereotypical but nonetheless friendly rich kid. In the early 1940s, the strip's "rich kid" was known as Marmaduke and in 2013, Rollo's father's name is given as Rollo Marmaduke Sr.
- Spike Kelly (a.k.a. Butch), the town bully who frequently fights with Sluggo, but does not always win out.
- Mr. And Mrs. Sputter, friends and neighbors of Fritzi who take care of Nancy while Fritzi is out of town, Mr. Sputter is especially annoyed by Nancy.

== Awards ==
Bushmiller won the National Cartoonists Society's Humor Comic Strip Award for 1961 and the Society's Reuben Award for Best Cartoonist of the Year in 1976.

In 1995, the strip was selected as one of the 20 in the "Comic Strip Classics" series of commemorative U.S. postage stamps.

== Comic books ==
There were first several Fritzi Ritz comic stories in comics published by United Feature Syndicate. These include Fritzi Ritz No. 1 (1948), 3–7 (1949), #27–36 (1953–1954); United Comics #8–36 (1950–1953); Tip Topper Comics #1–28 (1949–1954); St John published Fritzi Ritz #37–55 (1955–1957). Dell published Fritzi Ritz #56–59 (1957–1958)

Nancy appeared in comic books—initially in a 1940s comic strip reprint title from United Feature, later St. John Publications and later in a Dell comic written by John Stanley. Titled Nancy and Sluggo, United Feature published #16–23 (1949–1954), St. John published #121–145 (1955–1957). Titled Nancy, until retitled Nancy and Sluggo with issue No. 174, Dell published #146–187 (1957–1962). (Hy Eisman produced some of Dell's Nancy stories in 1960–61. Gold Key published #188–192 (1962–1963). Dell also published Dell Giants devoted to Nancy (#35, No. 45 and "Traveltime"), and a Four Color #1034. Nancy and Sluggo also appeared in stories in Tip Top Comics published by United Feature (#1–188), St. Johns (#189–210), and Dell (#211–225), Sparkler #1–120 (1941–1954) and Sparkle #1–33 (1953–1954) published by United Feature. Fritzi Ritz and Nancy appeared in several Comics on Parade (#32, 35, 38, 41, 44, 47, 50, 53, 55, 57, 60–104) published by United Feature.

Nancy was reprinted in the British comic paper The Topper, between the 1950s and the 1970s. Nancy also had its own monthly comic book magazine of newspaper reprints in Norway (where the strip is known as Trulte) during 1956–1959.

== Animation ==
Nancy was featured in two animated shorts by the Terrytoons studio in 1942: Doing Their Bit and School Daze. A third cartoon, Nancy's Little Theatre, was announced with a release date of October 16, 1942, but seems not to have been completed; Motion Picture Herald was the only trade journal to include it in booking listings, and later pulled it. In the cartoons, the character was voiced by Judy Stahr.

In 1971, several newly created Nancy and Sluggo cartoons appeared on the Saturday morning cartoon series Archie's TV Funnies, which starred the Archie Comic Series characters running a television station. Nancy appeared along with seven other comic strip characters: Emmy Lou, Broom-Hilda, Dick Tracy, The Dropouts, Moon Mullins, the Captain and the Kids and Smokey Stover. The series lasted one season. In 1978, she was also featured in several segments of Filmation's animated show Fabulous Funnies, a repackaging of Archie's TV Funnies material minus the Archie characters wraparounds.

== Foreign versions ==
A January 16, 2006 strip, from the French Canadian version of Nancy.

Nancy has been translated into a variety of languages, often with changes to characters' names. In Sweden, the strip is called Lisa och Sluggo. In French, Nancy is called Philomène in Canada, and Zoé in France, where the strip is called Arthur et Zoé (Arthur being the French name of Sluggo). Nancy also appeared on the back cover of the popular Arabic children magazine Majid during the 80s, she was known as Moza while Sluggo was portrayed as her brother Rashoud. In Mexico she is known as Periquita, while Sluggo is called Tito. In Brazil, Nancy and Sluggo were called Xuxuquinha and Marciano in the 60s and in the following decade as Tico and Teca (Sluggo and Nancy respectively), while in Italy the strip is called Arturo e Zoe (Sluggo and Nancy respectively).

== Collections ==
Comic strip (by Ernie Bushmiller)

- Nancy (1961), Pocket Books (The Fun-Filled Cartoon Adventures of Nancy)
- The Best of Ernie Bushmiller's Nancy by Brian Walker (1988), Henry Holt
- Kitchen Sink Press series:
  - Nancy Eats Food (Volume 1) (1989)
  - How Sluggo Survives (Volume 2) (1989)
  - Nancy Dreams and Schemes (Volume 3) (1990)
  - Bums, Beatniks and Hippies / Artists and Con Artists (Volume 4) (1990)
  - Nancy's Pets (Volume 5) (1991)
- Everything I Need to Know I Learned from Nancy: The Enduring Wisdom of Ernie Bushmiller (1993), Pharos Books
- Fantagraphics Books Complete Dailies series:
  - Nancy Is Happy: Complete Dailies 1942–1945 (2012)
  - Nancy Likes Christmas: Complete Dailies 1946–1948 (2012)
  - Nancy Loves Sluggo: Complete Dailies 1949–1951 (2014)
- Nancy and Sluggo's Guide to Life (2024), New York Review Comics (selected strips from the Kitchen Sink Press series alongside newly compiled strips)
- The Nancy Show: Celebrating the Art of Ernie Bushmiller (2024), Fantagraphics Books (Collection of art from a 2024 exhibition at the Billy Ireland Cartoon Library & Museum, includes several full color Sunday strips)
- Nancy Wears Hats (2025), Fantagraphics Books (Collection of dailies from the years 1949–1950, which previously appeared in Nancy Loves Sluggo.)
- Nancy For All Seasons (2026), Fantagraphics Books (Collection of dailies from the years 1951-1952.)

Comic book (by John Stanley)

- Nancy Vol. 1: The John Stanley Library (2009), Drawn & Quarterly
- Nancy Vol. 2: The John Stanley Library (2010), Drawn & Quarterly
- Nancy Vol. 3: The John Stanley Library (2011), Drawn & Quarterly
- Nancy Vol. 4: The John Stanley Library (2013), Drawn & Quarterly

Comic strip (by Olivia Jaimes)

- Nancy: A Comic Collection (2019), Andrews McMeel Publishing
- Nancy Wins at Friendship (2023), Andrews McMeel Publishing

== Random Acts of Nancy ==
A spin-off titled Random Acts of Nancy began March 19, 2014, consisting of sampled single panels of Nancy comics drawn by Ernie Bushmiller. Following Guy Gilchrist's departure from Nancy, this strip was discontinued.

== Nancy's Genius Plan ==
On October 1, 2019, Andrew McMeel Publishing released a spin-off board book, Nancy's Genius Plan, written and illustrated by Jaimes. In the book, Nancy's attempts to eat a slice of Fritzi's cornbread are aided by the reader, who is supposed to move the book in accordance with Nancy's commands.
