= Ernie Bushmiller =

American cartoonist (1905–1982)

- Ernie Bushmiller in the 1950s
- Born: Ernest Paul Bushmiller Jr. August 23, 1905 The Bronx, New York
- Died: August 15, 1982 (aged 76) Stamford, Connecticut
- Area: Cartoonist
- Notable works: Nancy
- Awards: Humor Comic Strip Award (National Cartoonists Society), 1976; Reuben Award, 1976; The Will Eisner Award Hall of Fame (Judges' Choice), 2011
- Spouse: Abby Bohnet

Ernest Paul Bushmiller Jr. (August 23, 1905 – August 15, 1982) was an American cartoonist, best known for creating the comic strip character Nancy in 1933, now in print for over 90 years. His work is noted for its simple graphic style. In 1976, he received the Reuben Award from the National Cartoonists Society for his work on Nancy.

== Childhood and training ==
Born in the South Bronx, New York, Bushmiller was the son of immigrant parents, Ernest George Bushmiller Sr. and Elizabeth Hall, originally from Germany and Northern Ireland respectively. His father was an artist, vaudevillian and bartender. He briefly attended Theodore Roosevelt High School before leaving at 14 to work as a copy boy at the New York World newspaper, while attending evening art classes at the National Academy of Design. He ran errands for the staff cartoonists and was given occasional illustration assignments, including a Sunday feature by Harry Houdini.

== Comic strips ==
In May 1925, cartoonist Larry Whittington, creator of the comic strip Fritzi Ritz, left to produce another strip, Mazie the Model. Bushmiller then took over, his name first appearing on the May 18 strip. Fritzi Ritz was expanded to a Sunday strip on October 6, 1929. Bushmiller had already been producing a comic strip for the New York Evening Graphic titled Mac the Manager.

Once he began to move away from Whittington's depiction of Fritzi, Bushmiller began to model her after his fiancée, Abby Bohnet, the daughter of a train conductor. The couple, who married July 9, 1930, had no children. In 1931, they headed for Hollywood, where Bushmiller wrote gags for Harold Lloyd's Movie Crazy, continuing to draw Fritzi Ritz at the same time. A year later, they returned to the Bronx.

Bushmiller claimed in 1948 that "All my characters are conceived in desperation." He introduced Nancy, Fritzi's niece, to the strip on January 2, 1933. The character proved popular, so she appeared more often. As Aunt Fritzi was seen less frequently, the strip was eventually retitled Nancy in 1938. The popular strip was translated into various languages, including Italian, German, Swedish and Norwegian. Phil Fumble is a Bushmiller strip which ran from 1932 through 1938.

Bushmiller started working each day about 2pm, and he often sat at his drawing table well into the early morning hours of the next day. He usually began a strip with the last panel and then worked back toward the first panel. In 1960 he told a reporter:

I try to find a sight gag and draw the last panel of the strip first, then work back from that to find out how it came about. I've got a trade secret - whenever I'm really stuck for a gag, I look through a Sears Roebuck catalog. Usually my eye hits on some article, like an ironing board, for example, and my mind starts to play around with what can be done with an ironing board, and finally I've got my gag.

The simplicity of his style brought praise from Art Spiegelman and other artists. Tom Smucker, writing in The Village Voice, observed:

Bushmiller's strong point was never the content of his comic strip's jokey plots—a friend once described him as "a moron on an acid trip." In fact, the gags were even simpler than was necessary for a "children's" strip. That's because they were just a vehicle for the controlled and brilliant manipulation of repetition and variety that gave the strip its unique visual rhythm and composition. Bushmiller choreographed his familiar formal elements inside the tightest frame of any major strip, and that helped make it the most beautiful, as a whole, of any in the papers.

As Paul Karasik and Mark Newgarden noted in their essay, "How to Read Nancy":

Ernie Bushmiller had the hand of an architect, the mind of a silent film comedian, and the soul of an accountant. His formulaic approach to humor beautifully revealed the essence of what a perfect gag is all about – balance, symmetry, economy. His gags have the abstract feel of math and Nancy was, in fact, a mini-algebra equation masquerading as a comic strip for close to 50 years.

Comics theorist Scott McCloud described the essence of Bushmiller and his creation:

Ernie Bushmiller's comic strip Nancy is a landmark achievement: A comic so simply drawn it can be reduced to the size of a postage stamp and still be legible; an approach so formulaic as to become the very definition of the "gag-strip"; a sense of humor so obscure, so mute, so without malice as to allow faithful readers to march through whole decades of art and story without ever once cracking a smile. Nancy is Plato's playground. Ernie Bushmiller didn't draw A tree, A house, A car. Oh, no. Ernie Bushmiller drew the tree, the house, the car. Much has been made of the "three rocks." Art Spiegelman explains how a drawing of three rocks in a background scene was Ernie's way of showing us there were some rocks in the background. It was always three. Why? Because two rocks wouldn't be "some rocks." Two rocks would be a pair of rocks. And four rocks was unacceptable because four rocks would indicate "some rocks" but it would be one rock more than was necessary to convey the idea of "some rocks." A Nancy panel is an irreduceable concept, an atom, and the comic strip is a molecule.

In 1979, Bushmiller was diagnosed with Parkinson's disease, but he continued to produce the strip with the help of assistants Will Johnson and Al Plastino. He lived in Stamford, Connecticut, where he died in 1982.

== Commissions ==
Art-book publisher Harry N. Abrams commissioned twenty newspaper cartoonists, including Bushmiller, to create a museum-quality lithograph. The 1978 publication was limited to a set of 100 signed and numbered sets. The price was $250 per print or $6000 for the full set.

== Awards ==
Bushmiller, one of the founding members of the National Cartoonists Society, received its Humor Comic Strip Award and its Reuben Award in 1976 for his work on Nancy. In 2011, Bushmiller was listed as a Judges' Choice for The Will Eisner Award Hall of Fame.

== Legacy ==
Nancy remains a recognised and popular character, drawn by other artists since Bushmiller's death, most recently by Caroline Cash as of 2026. Bushmiller's work has been repeatedly addressed by other artists: Andy Warhol made a 1961 painting based on Nancy, and Joe Brainard made numerous works based on Nancy. Many cartoonists have produced work directly inspired by or commenting on Bushmiller's art, including Art Spiegelman, Mark Newgarden, Chris Ware, and Zippy cartoonist Bill Griffith, who has also written an essay on Bushmiller. Griffith revealed in the August 19, 2020 Zippy strip that he was writing and drawing a graphic biography of Bushmiller; it was published in August 2023. In 2026 comedy writer Tom Gammill debuted his play about Bushmiller called A Morning With Ernie Bushmiller.

The 1973 edition of the American Heritage Dictionary uses a Bushmiller Nancy strip to illustrate its entry for "comic strip".
