= David Mazzucchelli =

American comics artist and writer (born 1960)

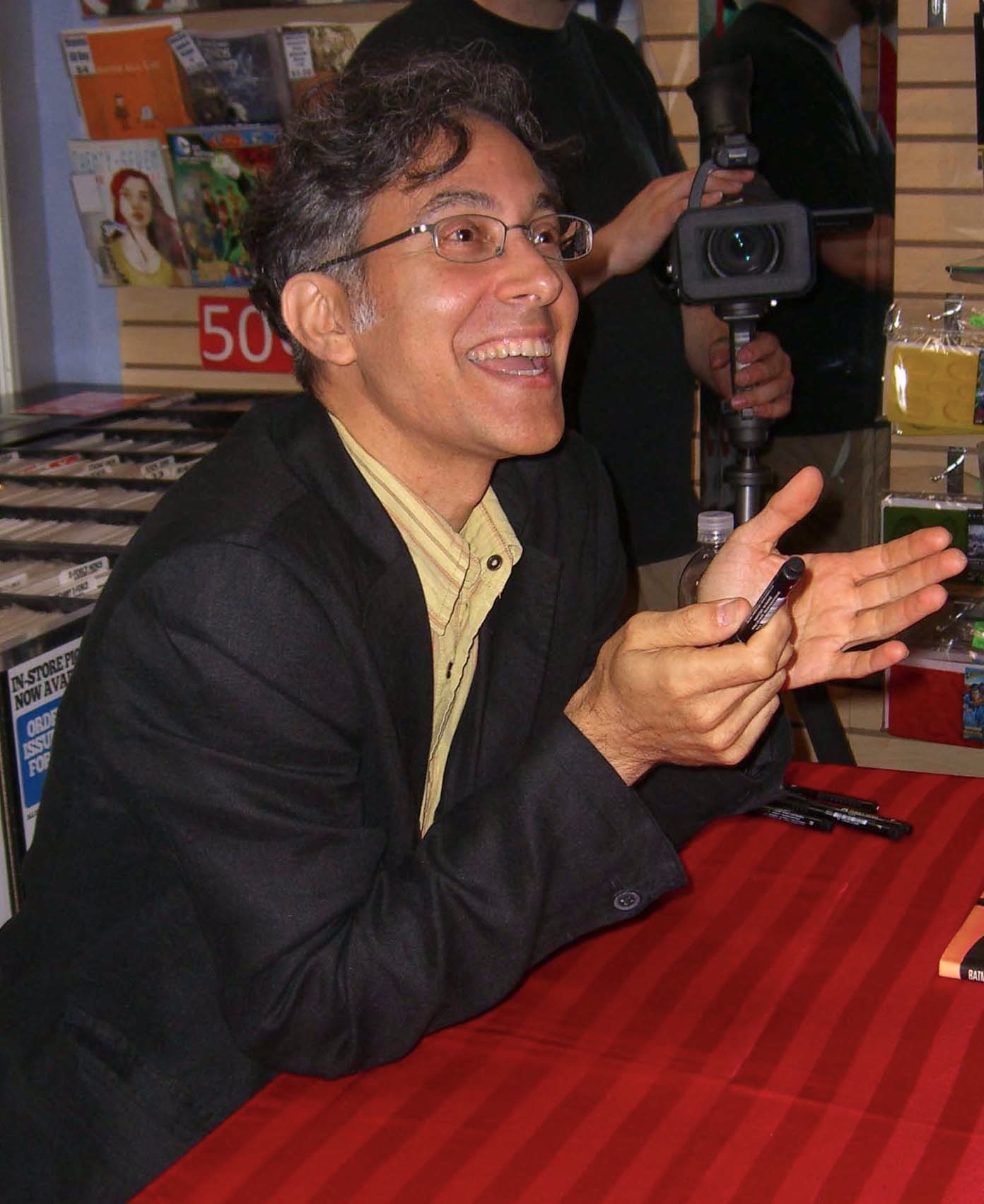
- Mazzucchelli at a June 28, 2012 book signing at Midtown Comics in Manhattan
- Born: David John Mazzucchelli; September 21, 1960 (age 66) Providence, Rhode Island, U.S.
- Areas: Cartoonist, Writer, Penciller, Inker
- Notable works: Asterios Polyp; Daredevil; Batman: Year One; Rubber Blanket; City of Glass: The Graphic Novel
- Awards: Swann Foundation for Caricature and Cartoon; New Jersey State Council on the Arts Fellowship; Japan/U.S. Friendship Commission Creative Artists Fellowship; Los Angeles Times Book Prize

David John Mazzucchelli (/ˌmæzuːˈkɛli/; born September 21, 1960) is an American comics artist and writer, known for his work on seminal superhero comic book storylines Daredevil: Born Again and Batman: Year One, as well as for graphic novels in other genres, such as Asterios Polyp and City of Glass: The Graphic Novel. He is also an instructor who teaches comic book storytelling at the School of Visual Arts in Manhattan.

== Career ==
Mazzucchelli received his BFA from the Rhode Island School of Design, and started working in comics in the early 1980s, first at Marvel Comics where, after a few fill-in jobs, he became the regular artist on Daredevil. He worked with writer Denny O'Neil and culminated his work on this title with the Daredevil: Born Again (Feb.–Aug. 1986) story arc, written by Frank Miller.

Miller and Mazzucchelli collaborated again on the graphic novel Batman: Year One, serialized in issues #404–407 (Feb.–May 1987) of DC Comics' monthly Batman title, and published in a single volume shortly afterwards. Batman: Year One is considered one of the best Batman stories ever produced. Mazzucchelli had previously drawn Batman in a five-page backup story in World's Finest Comics #302 (April 1984).

After Batman: Year One, Mazzucchelli drew an Angel story in Marvel Fanfare #40 (Oct. 1988). He then moved on to focus on more personal projects. He published three issues of his own independent anthology, Rubber Blanket, co-edited by his wife, painter Richmond Lewis, in which he began finding his voice as a writer in addition to exploring new avenues of visual expression. His evocative and haunting stories in Rubber Blanket, notably "Near Miss," "Dead Dog," "Discovering America," and "Big Man," set the stage for his work to come. Mazzucchelli's work in Rubber Blanket, and especially his use of two-color printing to create his artwork, influenced a number of young indie-comics artists through the 1990s and 2000s, including Darwyn Cooke, Frank Santoro, and Dash Shaw. With writer/artist Paul Karasik, he co-wrote and illustrated an adaptation of Paul Auster's City of Glass, published first by Avon Books in 1994, then by Picador in 2004 as City of Glass: The Graphic Novel. Auster's later book The Brooklyn Follies features a character with the name Nancy Mazzucchelli, an homage to David. He continued to write and draw short comics for various publishers until 2000. Mazzucchelli was one of the artists on the Superman and Batman: World's Funnest one-shot written by Evan Dorkin.

In 2009, Pantheon Books published Mazzucchelli's graphic novel, Asterios Polyp. The book was named a New York Times Notable Book for that year, and won the 2010 Los Angeles Times Book Prize for graphic novels.

Mazzucchelli has done illustrations for various publications, including interior pieces and covers for The New Yorker In 2011, an animated adaptation of Batman: Year One was released by Warner Home Video.

On October 9, 2026, at the 38th Harvey Awards ceremony, Mazzucchelli was one of a group of creators associated with Batman, who along with Frank Miller, Klaus Janson, Jerry Robinson, Dick Sprang and former DC Comics president and publisher Jenette Kahn, was inducted into the Harvey Awards Hall of Fame.

Mazzucchelli has taught a cartooning course for BFA students at the School of Visual Arts in Manhattan.

== Awards ==
- 2009 Los Angeles Times Book Prize Graphic Novel Award
- 2010 Will Eisner Comic Industry Awards, Best Graphic Album—New; Best Writer/Artist; Best Lettering (for Asterios Polyp)
- 2010 Harvey Awards, Best Original Graphic Album; Best Single Issue or Story; Best Letterer (for Asterios Polyp)
- Japan-U.S. Friendship Commission Creative Artist Fellowship
- Morning Manga Fellowship
- New Jersey State Council on the Arts
- Erwin Swann Award, Swann Foundation for Caricature and Cartoon
- 2012 HQ Mix Award for Foreign Artist (for Asterios Polyp)
- 2012 HQ Mix Award for Foreign Writer (for Asterios Polyp)
- 2026 inductee into the Harvey Awards Hall of Fame

== Bibliography ==
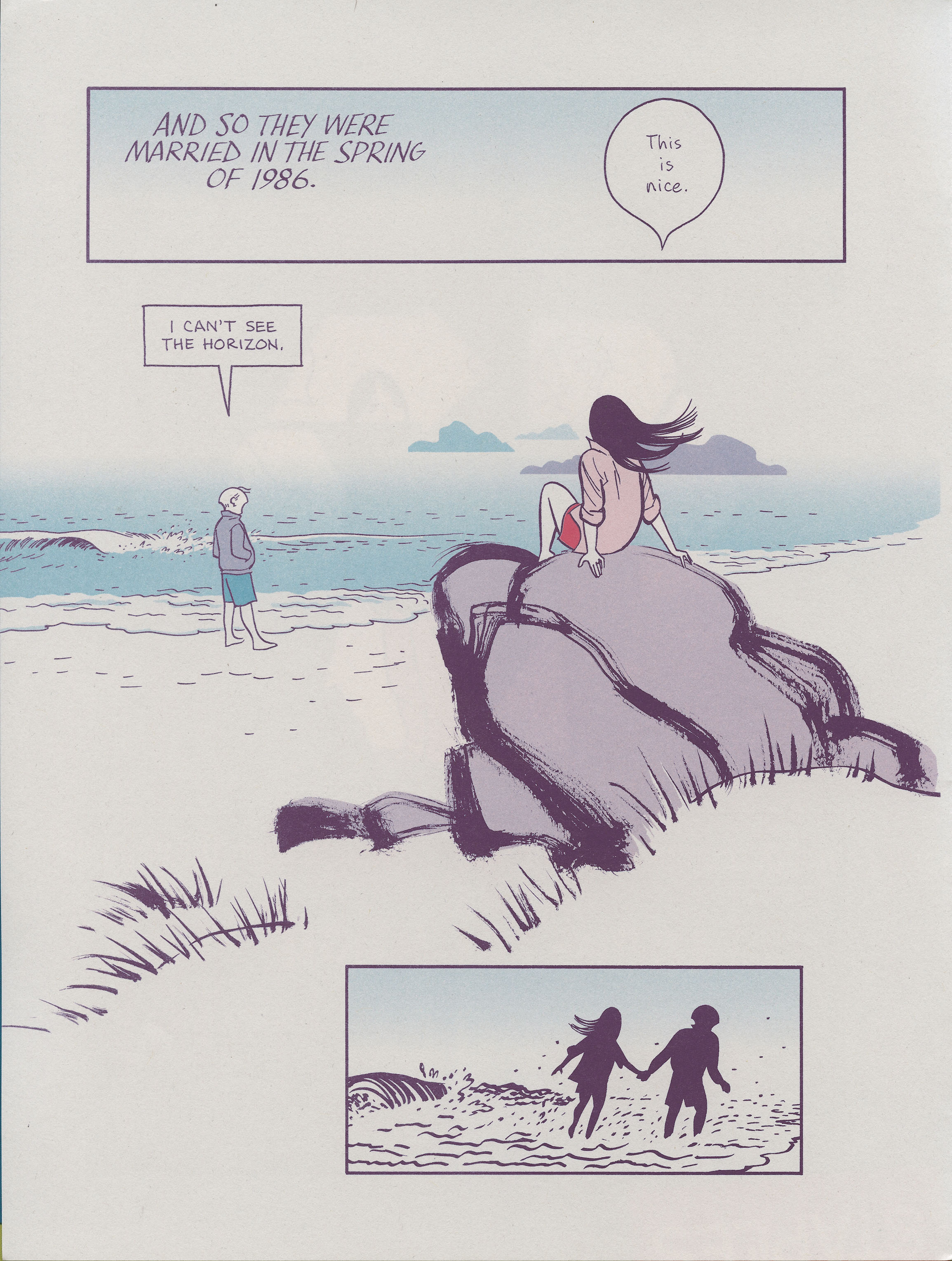
A page from Asterios Polyp (2009)

- Shang-Chi, Master of Kung Fu #121: "Passing Strangers!" (with Steven Grant, Marvel, 1983)
- The Further Adventures of Indiana Jones #14: "Demons" (with David Michelinie, Marvel, 1984)
- World's Finest Comics #302: "No Rest for Heroes!" (with David Anthony Kraft, DC Comics, 1984)
- Daredevil (Marvel):
  - "Every Good and Perfect Gift..." (with Dennis O'Neil, in #206, 1984)
  - "The Deadliest Night of My Life!" (with Harlan Ellison and Arthur Byron Cover, in #208, 1984)
  - "Blast from the Past" (with Arthur Byron Cover, in #209, 1984)
  - "The War on Micah Synn" (with Dennis O'Neil, in #210–214, 1984–1985)
  - "Prophecy" (with Dennis O'Neil, in #215, 1985)
  - "The Second Secret" (with Dennis O'Neil, in #216–217, 1985)
  - "Fog" (with Dennis O'Neil, in #220–221, 1985)
  - "Fear in a Handful of Dust..." (with Dennis O'Neil, in #222, 1985)
  - "The Price" (with Dennis O'Neil and Jim Shooter, in #223, 1985)
  - "...And Then You Die!" (with Dennis O'Neil, in #225, 1985)
  - "Warriors" (with Dennis O'Neil and Frank Miller, in #226, 1986)
  - "Born Again" (with Frank Miller, in #227–233, 1986)
- Star Wars #84: "Seoul Searching" (with Roy Richardson, Marvel, 1984)
- Marvel Team-Up Annual #7: "No Place to Run" (with Bob DeNatale, co-feature, Marvel, 1984)
- Batman #404–407: "Year One" (with Frank Miller, DC Comics, 1987)
- X-Factor #16: "Playing with Fire!" (with Louise Simonson, Marvel, 1987)
- Marvel Fanfare #40: "Chiaroscuro" (with Ann Nocenti, anthology, Marvel, 1988)
- Rubber Blanket #1–3 (script and art, self-published anthology, 1991–1993)
- Nozone #3, 5–6 (script and art, anthology, 1991–1995)
- Drawn & Quarterly (script and art, anthology):
  - "It's a Beautiful Day in the Epsilon-Neighborhood" (in vol. 1 #9, 1992)
  - "Rates of Exchange" (in vol. 2 #2, 1994)
- Bill & Ted's Excellent Comic Book #2 (with Stephen DeStefano – inks on Evan Dorkin, Marvel, 1992)
- Snake Eyes #3: "Phobia" (script and art, anthology, Fantagraphics, 1993)
- Paul Auster's City of Glass (with Paul Karasik, graphic novel, Avon Books, 1994)
- Zero Zero #2, 11, 27 (script and art, anthology, Fantagraphics, 1995–2000)
- Jingle Belle #1: "Miserable on 34th Street" (inks on Stephen DeStefano, written by Paul Dini, Oni Press, 1999)
- Superman and Batman: World's Funnest: "Last Imp Standing!" (with Evan Dorkin, among other artists, one-shot, DC Comics, 2000)
- Little Lit: Folklore & Fairy Tale Funnies: "The Fisherman and the Sea Princess" (script and art, anthology graphic novel, HarperCollins, 2000)
- The Comics Journal Special #1: "The Boy Who Loved Comics" (script and art, co-feature, Fantagraphics, 2001)
- Asterios Polyp (script and art, graphic novel, Pantheon Books, 2009)
- Fairy Tale Comics: "Give Me the Shudders" (script and art, anthology graphic novel, First Second, 2013)

=== Covers only ===
- Rom Spaceknight #61 (Marvel, 1984)
- Marvel Age #36 (Marvel, 1986)
- Amazing Heroes #102 (Fantagraphics, 1986)
- Snake Eyes #1–2 (Fantagraphics, 1990–1992)
- Cheval Noir #40 (Dark Horse, 1993)
- The Comics Journal #188, 194 (Fantagraphics, 1996–1997)

=== Interviews and other work ===
- Marvel Age #36: "Miller and Mazzucchelli on Daredevil" (interview, Marvel, 1986)
- Amazing Heroes #102: "David Mazzucchelli on Daredevil, Batman: Year One" (interview, Fantagraphics, 1986)
- Detective Comics #598, 600: "Tribute: People of Note Pay Homage to the Batman" (pin-ups, DC Comics, 1989)
- The Comics Journal #152, 194, 300 (interviews, Fantagraphics, 1992–2009)
- Negative Burn (anthology, Caliber Comics):
  - "Spotlight: Rubber Blanket" (in #10, 1994)
  - "Sketchbook" (in #17, 1994)
- Comic Culture vol. 2 #4: "Rubber Blanket: Voices from the Small Press" (interview, 1995)
- Panel Discussions: Design in Sequential Art Storytelling (interview, TwoMorrows, 2002)
- Comic Book Artist vol. 2 #6: "Paying Homage: Tribute to the Great Will Eisner" (Top Shelf, 2005)

==== Newspapers and magazines ====
- "Castles in the Sand" (cover of The New Yorker, July 26, 1993)
- "The Fine Art of Hanging Ryman" (in The New Yorker, October 4, 1993)
- "May Day" (cover of The New Yorker, May 2, 1994)
- "Post Mort on Columbus Circle" (in The New Yorker, May 16, 1994)
- "Monday in the Park with Marlon" (in The New Yorker, September 19, 1994)
- "Fall" (cover of The New Yorker, October 24, 1994)
- "New String" (in The Village Voice, 1994)

Preceded by William Johnson	Daredevil artist 1984–1986	Succeeded by Steve Ditko
Preceded by Denys Cowan	Batman artist 1987	Succeeded by Chris Warner
