= Asterios Polyp =

2009 graphic novel by American cartoonist David Mazzucchelli

- Date: July 2009
- Page count: 344 pages
- Publisher: Pantheon Books

Creative team
- Creator: David Mazzucchelli
- ISBN: 0307377326

Asterios Polyp is a 2009 graphic novel by American cartoonist David Mazzucchelli.

== Overview ==
The title character, Asterios Polyp, is a professor and architect of Greek and Italian descent who teaches at Cornell University in Ithaca, New York. After a lightning strike burns up his apartment, he leaves the city on a Greyhound bus and takes up employment as an auto mechanic in the town of Apogee (somewhere in America, likely Arizona), the furthest point his money will take him. The novel is interspersed with scenes from his past (ostensibly narrated by his stillborn twin brother, Ignazio), including his childhood and troubled marriage, as well as dreams and allegorical sequences. Finally, Asterios must not only confront his own flawed nature, but the implacable and amoral whims of the gods themselves.

== Themes ==
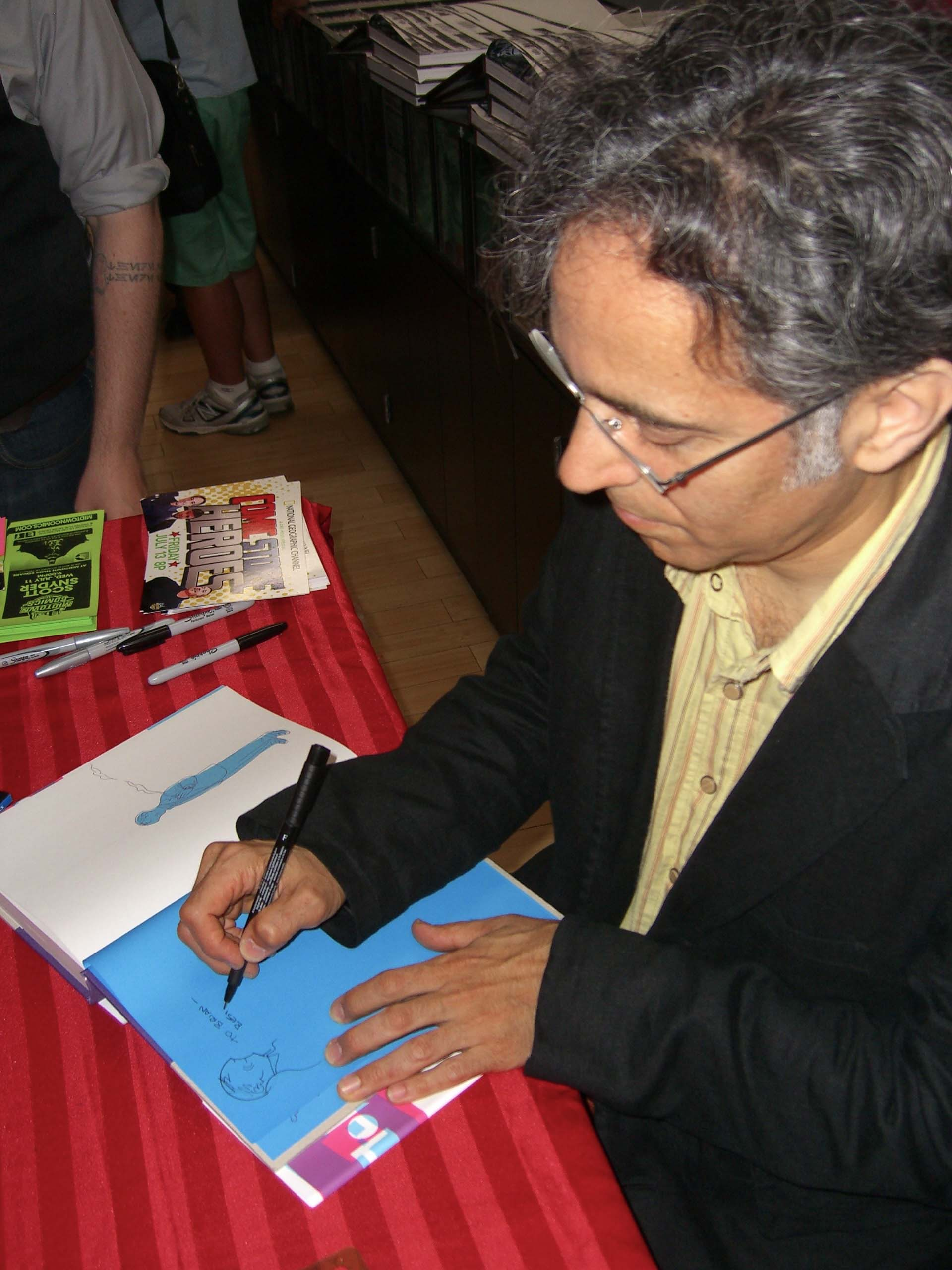
Mazzucchelli sketching the titular character in a fan's copy of the book at a June 2012 signing at Midtown Comics in Manhattan.

In plot, structure, and design, this book explores the idea of duality. Some of the false dichotomies touched upon are: Apollonian vs. Dionysian; reason vs. emotion; destiny vs. freewill; and nature vs. nurture. Ultimately, the book raises questions about how a person becomes who and what he is. Asterios' Greek heritage is one of many allusions to the story of Orpheus and Euridice, a recurring theme throughout the book. It can also be related to the Odyssey, upon which the story is loosely based.

== Publication ==
Asterios Polyp grew out of a story idea that would have filled the entire fourth issue of Rubber Blanket. It was published as a hardcover, with an architectonic design that alluded to themes of form and function within the text, including a dust jacket shorter than the size of the book which revealed the structure underneath. Questioned about the impracticality of his design, Mazzucchelli joked that it was "the most frustrating package [I] could come up with".

== Reception ==
The book won the first Los Angeles Times Book Prize Graphic Novel award. It received four 2010 Eisner Award nominations and won for best new graphic album, best writer/artist and best lettering. It also won three 2010 Harvey Awards.
