= B. Happy =

B. Happy (1999) is a Cartoon Network "World Premiere Toons" series created by Mark Newgarden. It was originally produced in Flash 3.0 by Funny Garbage and was one of the two WPT launch titles. The series lasted four episodes and ran 24 hours a day on cartoonnetwork.com from 1999–2003. In each episode B. Happy, a reluctant Bluebird Of Happiness, is dispatched to Earth by Maureen, the Goddess of Happiness, to help determine a case of personal human misery. If B. Happy chooses incorrectly he is made personally miserable himself by the angry Goddess. If he chooses correctly, he is rewarded with complex carbohydrates. The viewer (augmented by the technological marvel of CLICK-O-RAMA) helps the decide the fate of each case and of B. Happy himself.

== Characters ==
- B. Happy- The main character of the series who appears to possess the accommodations of a stereotypical beatnik. When the problematic personal situations of the people on Earth come to the point of utter chaos B. Happy is dispatched by the goddess Maureen unto Earth to fix their problems. Forced out of his home in Heaven, B. Happy must fix the problems of the people on Earth if he ever wants to come back. B. Happy is a lazy irritable bird whose attitude makes it unlikely he can achieve world peace. Whenever B. Happy can't solve a person's problem he is left to his last resort which he calls "The Egg", in which (even though he's male) he lays an egg that ultimately holds the answers to all problems.
- Maureen- A god-like figure who watches over Earth and looks over the actions of people, especially B. Happy. Maureen is a single, giant, purple head and can appear in front of B. Happy at will, usually to inform him if he's passed or failed one part of his mission. She, herself, won't help B. Happy and is infuriatingly mad whenever B. Happy fails one part of his mission (and usually electrocutes him) but duly pleased whenever he succeeds (and sings happily, to the annoyance of B. Happy).

== Episode guide ==
- Episode 1: The Case of The Pity Kitty- A smaller cat is bullied by a bigger cat and takes away the smaller cat's food. B. Happy tries to devise payback for the bigger cat and have in return food for the smaller cat.
- Episode 2: The Case of The Hiccuping Arteest- B. Happy must cure the hiccups of an artist.
- Episode 3: The Case of The Bawling Baby- B. Happy must stop the never-ending crying of a bratty baby hopefully to take away the grief of the baby's mother.
- Episode 4: A Personal Message To You From B. Happy- B. Happy has a personal talk with the viewers.

== Credits ==
- Created, Written & Directed by Mark Newgarden
- Executive Producers: John Carlin, Mark Newgarden
- Creative Directors: Peter Girardi, Chris Capuzzo
- Producers: Kristin Ellinington, Denise Rotina
- Co- producer: Laura Rosenberg Kraning
- Production Assistants: Mia Lotringer, Seth Cooper
- Technical Director: Veronique Brossier
- Title Design: Peter Girardi
- Lead Animator: Devin Flynn
- Animation: Veronique Brossier, John F. Brzyski, Xeth Feinberg
- Additional Animators: Dave Redl, Jason Sawtelle
- Inking: Bill "Ink Slugger" Alger, Valerie Cillufo, Megan Montgue Cash
- Audio Production: Seth Cooper
- Voices: Susan B. Murray, Russ Reiley, Brian Dewan
- Music and Sound Design: Brian Dewan

== Trivia ==
- All the characters in B. Happy are colored in one color, sometimes colored with different shades of the same color. This however excludes the characters' eyes which are always white.
- Through an interactive interface called CLICK-O-RAMA viewers could decide for themselves the outcome of each storyline by choosing how to handle the certain situation by clicking on a possible solution, this was one highlight of the series.
- B Happy is also the title of a Chilean movie, released in 2004, which has gained international critical acclaim.

== See also ==
- Cartoon Network
- Funny Garbage
