= How to Read Nancy =

Essay on a comic strip

"How to Read Nancy" is an essay by Mark Newgarden and Paul Karasik, originally published in The Best of Ernie Bushmiller's Nancy by Brian Walker (Henry Holt/Comicana, 1988). The piece examines the comic strip Nancy, focusing on Bushmiller's use of the comics language to deliver a gag. Finding correspondences to the minimalist architecture of Mies van der Rohe, the essay calls Nancy "a complex amalgam of formal rules laid out by [its] designer."

== Description ==
"How to Read Nancy" is distinguished by its extensive analysis of a single Nancy comic strip originally published on August 8, 1959. The essay successively isolates and discusses the strip's individual formal elements (including the placement of word balloons, the level of the horizon line, the spotting of blacks, and panel shape and size) to demonstrate each codependent aspect of comics syntax. The essay has been used in a variety of university level courses about comics; a full 25% of syllabi listed on the National Association of Comics Arts Educators (NACAE) website include the essay in their required reading.

"How to Read Nancy" is an outgrowth of Karasik and Newgarden's lifelong interest in Bushmiller's work. Newgarden had previously drawn "Love's Savage Fury," a four-page tribute to Nancy originally published in RAW Magazine v. 1 #8 in 1986 (also republished in The Best of Ernie Bushmiller's Nancy), and the pair had assigned a Nancy-related assignment to students in a "Language of Comics" class that they co-taught in the 1980s at the School of Visual Arts in New York. One example of student work from that class, cartoonist R. Sikoryak's "Ancy," was later published in Legal Action Comics v. 1.

== Book ==
The original "How to Read Nancy" essay is available as a PDF download from Newgarden's website. Karasik and Newgarden have expanded the essay to book length, released on October 31, 2017, published by Fantagraphics Books as a companion to their multi-volume Nancy reprint series. The book won an Eisner Award in 2018 for "Best Comics Related Book".

== See also ==
- Understanding Comics
