= Paul Karasik =

American cartoonist (born 1956)

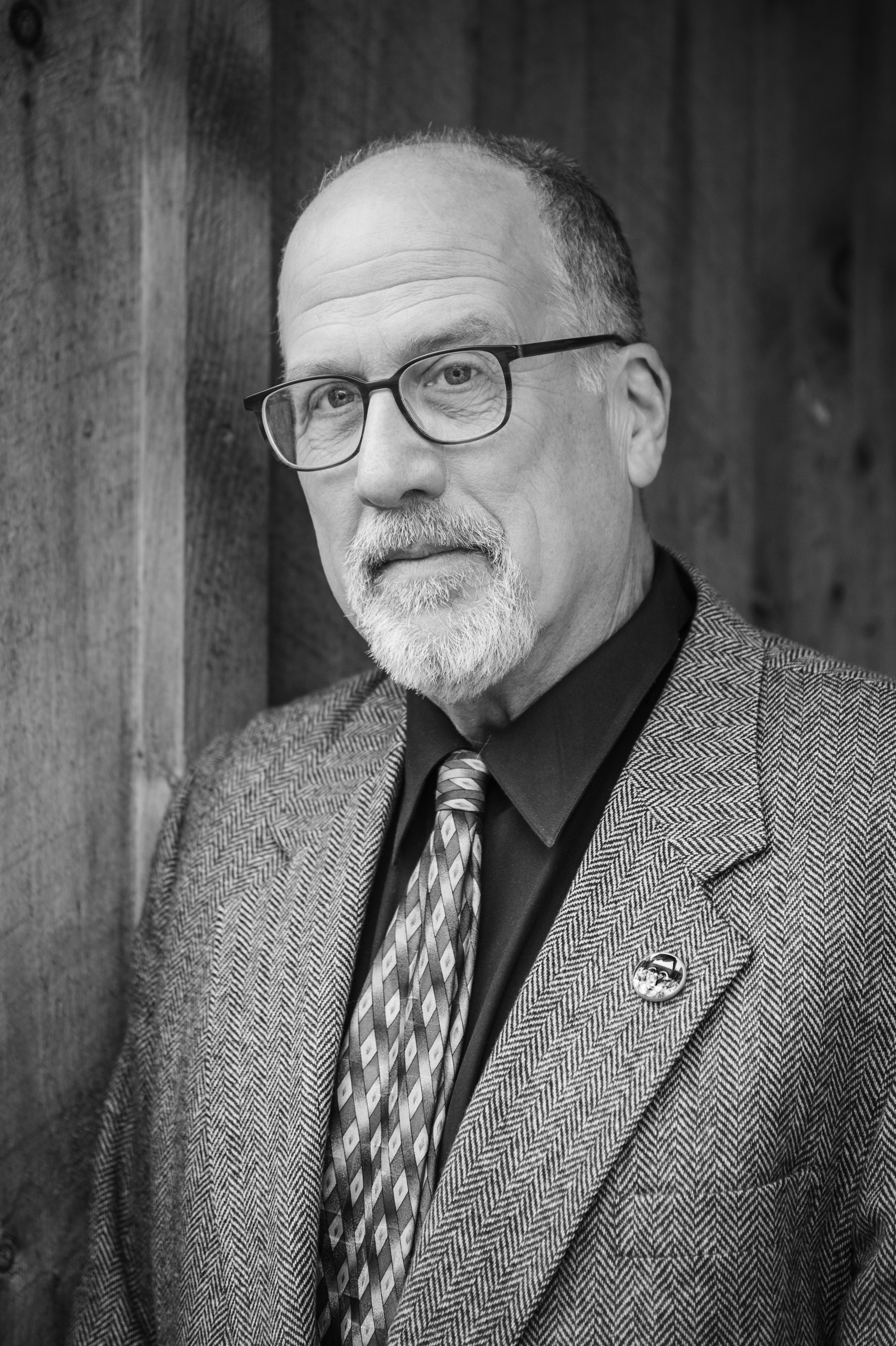
- Born: 1956 (age 69–70) Washington, D.C.
- Areas: Cartoonist, Writer, Editor
- Notable works: Paul Auster's City of Glass; The Ride Together: A Memoir of Autism in the Family; Turn Loose Our Death Rays and Kill Them All!
- Awards: Eisner Award, 2008 and 2018
- Spouse: Marsha Winsryg

Paul Karasik (/kəˈræsɪk/ kara-sick; born 1956) is an American cartoonist, editor, and teacher, notable for his contributions to such works as City of Glass: The Graphic Novel, The Ride Together: A Memoir of Autism in the Family, and Turn Loose Our Death Rays and Kill Them All!. He is the coauthor, with Mark Newgarden, of How to Read Nancy, 2018 winner of the Eisner Award for "Best Comics-Related Book". His work has appeared in The New York Times, The Washington Post and he is also an occasional cartoonist for The New Yorker.

== Life and career ==
In the early 1980s, after having graduated from the Pratt Institute, Karasik studied briefly at the School of Visual Arts (SVA) in New York, where he was a student of Will Eisner, Harvey Kurtzman, and Art Spiegelman.

In 1981, Spiegelman, with his wife, Françoise Mouly, invited Karasik to become associate editor of their seminal international comics and graphics revue, RAW, a position Karasik held until 1985. During this period, originally under the auspices of Spiegelman and SVA, Karasik co-edited with fellow cartoonist Mark Newgarden three issues of Bad News, which ran work by many of the RAW cartoonists, including Kim Deitch, Ben Katchor, Richard McGuire, and Jerry Moriarty. He and Newgarden wrote the essay "How to Read Nancy," originally published in The Best of Ernie Bushmiller’s Nancy by Brian Walker (Henry Holt/Comicana, 1988). Karasik and Mark Newgarden expanded the "How to Read Nancy" essay to book length, published in 2017 by Fantagraphics Books. The book won an Eisner Award in 2018.

In 1994 Karasik collaborated with David Mazzucchelli to adapt Paul Auster's novel City of Glass into a full-length comic. This adaptation was cited by The Comics Journal as one of the "100 Best Comics of the 20th Century". Translated into more than a dozen languages, the graphic novel has been exhibited in Italy. It was excerpted in The Norton Anthology of Post-Modern American Fiction.

Karasik's book The Ride Together: A Memoir of Autism in the Family (2004), co-written with his sister, Judy Karasik, employed the format of alternating prose and comics chapters to tell their story of growing up with an older brother with autism. The Ride Together was named the Best Literary Work of the Year by the Autism Society of America.

Karasik co-edited of Masters of American Comics (2005), the coffee-table companion catalog to the first major American exhibition of comics, co-sponsored by the Hammer Museum and the Museum of Contemporary Canadian Art.

His anthology highlighting the work of the (previously) obscure Golden Age cartoonist Fletcher Hanks, I Shall Destroy All The Civilized Planets (Fantagraphics, 2007), won a 2008 Eisner Award, the highest honor in the industry. A second volume, You Shall Die By Your Own Evil Creation (Fantagraphics, 2009), when combined with the first, comprises the complete works of Fletcher Hanks. Turn Loose Our Death Rays and Kill Them All!, a volume combining the two earlier books with some added material, was published in 2016.

In 2025, he completed the graphic novel adaptions of Paul Auster's "The New York Trilogy" ,adding "Ghosts" (scripted by Karasik and illustrated by Lorenzo Mattotti), and "The Locked Room" (both scripted and illustrated by himself), along with the 1994 adaptation of "City of Glass" to create the 3-in-1 graphic novel, "Paul Auster's New York Trilogy" (Pantheon). Presenting the book at the 2025 San Diego Comic Con, Karasik was presented with the Inkpot Achievement Award.

As Program Director of the comics festival Comic Arts Brooklyn for two years, Karasik conducted interviews with Paul Auster, Charles Burns, Roz Chast, Jeff Smith, Art Spiegelman, et al.

Paul Karasik’s gag cartoons and essays have appeared in The New York Times, The Nation and The New Yorker.

=== Teaching ===
Also a teacher, Karasik has taught at Packer Collegiate Institute, the Rhode Island School of Design, Boston University, and the School of Visual Arts in the United States, and abroad at the EESI school in Angoulême, France, The Animation Workshop in Viborg, Denmark, and, at the Scuola Internazionale di Comics in Rome and Florence, Italy. He has given workshops and lectured at The Center for Cartoon Studies, and given writing seminars at Bennington College, American University, Princeton University, Penn State, and Wheaton College.

He was the first Stuckeman Professor of Interdisciplinary Studies at Penn State University in the autumn of 2017 and Visiting Professor at Texas A&M in the spring of 2020.

== Personal life ==
Karasik grew up in the Washington, D.C. area. He moved to Martha's Vineyard, Massachusetts, in 1989. Karasik's wife, Marsha Winsryg, is an accomplished pastel artist and painter, and Director of the African Artists Community Development Project, raising awareness and funds for a community of children with disabilities in Zambia.

== Bibliography ==
- Paul Auster's City of Glass, with David Mazzucchelli, (Avon Books, August 1994) [re-issued 2004] ISBN 0-380-77108-X
- The Ride Together: A Memoir of Autism in the Family (Washington Square Press, September 14, 2004) ISBN 0-7434-2337-2
- I Shall Destroy All the Civilized Planets (Fantagraphics, 2007) ISBN 1-56097-839-2
- You Shall Die By Your Own Evil Creation (Fantagraphics, 2009) ISBN 1-60699-160-4
- Turn Loose Our Death Rays and Kill Them All! (Fantagraphics, 2016) ISBN 1606999672
- How to Read "Nancy" with Mark Newgarden (Fantagraphics, 2017) ISBN 1606999672
- Paul Auster's The New York Trilogy with David Mazzucchelli and Lorenzo Mattotti (Pantheo, 2025) ISBN 0553387642
