= City of Glass (comics) =

Graphic novel by Paul Karasik and David Mazzucchell

- Cover art for the 2004 Picador edition.

Publication information
- Publisher: Avon Books; Picador (re-issue)
- Format: Graphic novel
- Publication date: 1994; 2004 (re-issue)
- Main character(s): Daniel Quinn; Paul Auster; Peter Stillman

Creative team
- Created by: Paul Auster; Paul Karasik; David Mazzucchelli

City of Glass: The Graphic Novel, by Paul Karasik and David Mazzucchelli, is a comics adaptation of American author Paul Auster's novella City of Glass.

== Publication history ==
The original comic was published by Avon Books as Neon Lit: Paul Auster's City of Glass (a Graphic Mystery). The project was led by influential and popular comics artist Art Spiegelman. The original printing was well-received, and the work was chosen as one of "The Top 100 English-Language Comics of the Century". Nonetheless, the book quickly fell out of print.

In 2004, a new edition of the book was released as City of Glass: The Graphic Novel, which featured an introduction by Spiegelman. In this introduction, Spiegelman called the graphic novel "a breakthrough work." Since then, the book has been translated numerous times, with 20 foreign editions.

== Plot ==
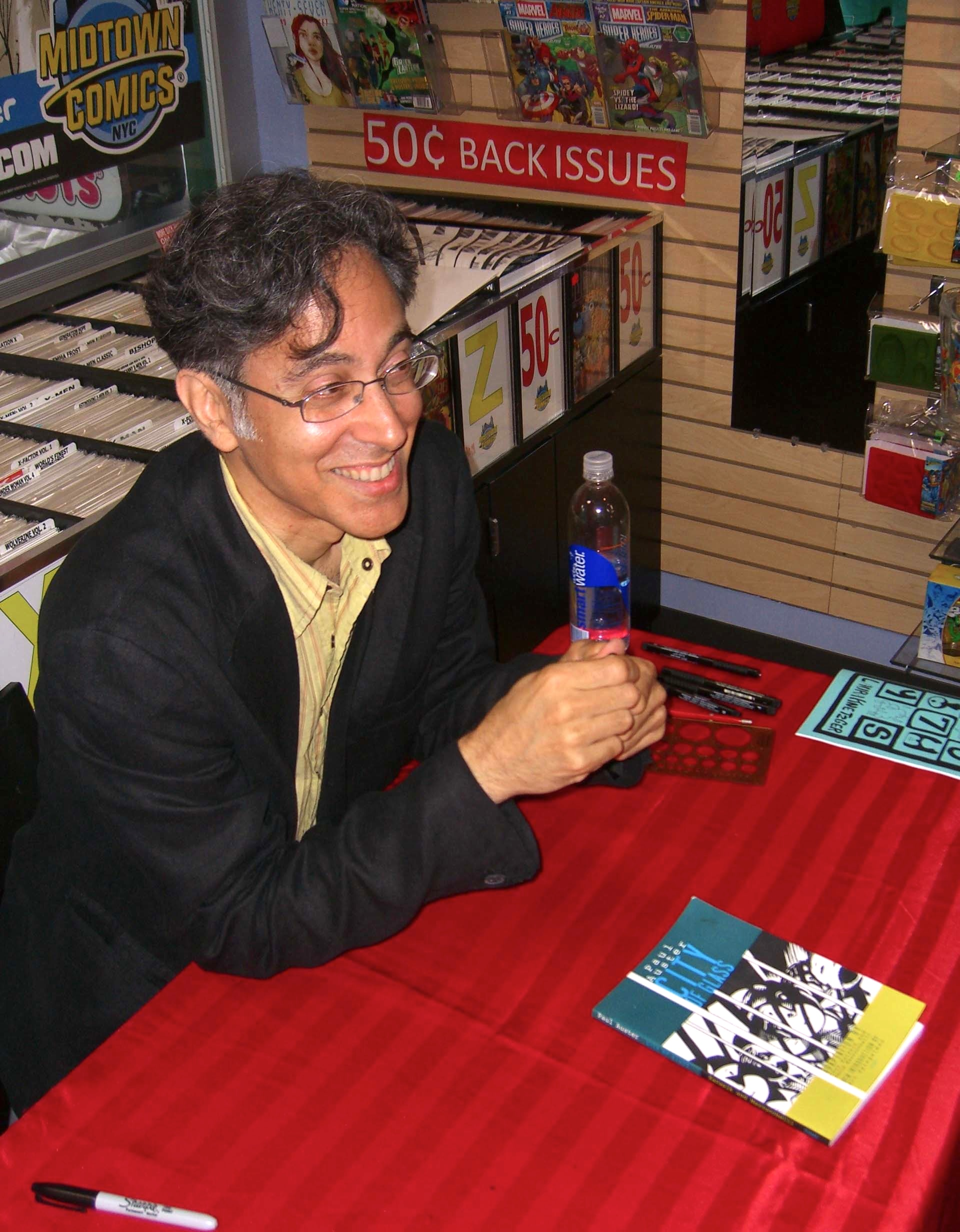
Mazzucchelli autographing a copy of the book at a June 28, 2012, signing at Midtown Comics in Manhattan.

The story follows a man named Daniel Quinn. One night, he receives a call meant for a private detective (strangely enough named Paul Auster, the same name as the author of the story). Quinn is intrigued by the phone call, and takes the case. His employers end up being a man, named Peter Stillman, and his wife. Through the course of the narrative, Quinn discovers some surprising things about identity, language, and human nature. He also ends up meeting, not the unseen detective Paul Auster, but writer Paul Auster.

In one section of Paul Auster's original novella, Peter Stillman delivers a long, somewhat disjointed speech about his life and the job that he has for Daniel Quinn. In the comic adaptation, the interplay between words and pictures is particularly interesting, with the word balloons coming less often from Stillman and more often from inkwells, storm drains, and even cave paintings. Spiegelman was particularly impressed with this section of the book, noting how well it translated Auster's description of Stillman's speech patterns.

== Exhibitions ==
In March 2009, the City of Glass adaptation was given exhibition treatment, including Karasik's original layouts and Mazzucchelli's original art, as part of a Paul Auster celebration at the Dedica Literary Festival in Pordenone, Italy.
