= Caroline Cash =

American cartoonist (born 1996)

- Born: January 9, 1996 (age 30) Charleston, South Carolina, U.S.
- Area: Cartoonist
- Notable works: PeePee PooPoo; Nancy
- Awards: Ignatz Award (2022); Eisner Award (2024)

Caroline Cash (born January 9, 1996) is an American cartoonist known for her autobiographical comic series PeePee PooPoo, and as the current cartoonist of the syndicated comic strip Nancy in 2026. Her work has appeared in publications including The New Yorker, the Chicago Reader, The Nib, and the Museum of Modern Art's online magazine.

== Early life and education ==
Cash was born in Charleston, South Carolina, and raised in Mount Pleasant. She attended the Charleston County School of the Arts before enrolling at the School of the Art Institute of Chicago (SAIC), where she received a BFA in 2019.

While at SAIC, she began self-publishing comics and participating in small-press and zine festivals.

== Career ==
Cash first gained attention with her early comics, including Girl in the World (2019), published by Silver Sprocket. She is also known for her comic series PeePee PooPoo which received the Ignatz Award for Outstanding Minicomic and the Eisner Award for Best Limited Series.

In 2025, Cash wrote and illustrated Adventure Time: The Bubbline College Special for Oni Press.

After she contributed as a guest cartoonist to Nancy in 2024, Cash became the strip's full-time cartoonist on January 1, 2026, succeeding Olivia Jaimes. Cash described the opportunity as "a real dream come true," adding that Nancy had long been her favorite comic strip. Cash has said that her approach to Nancy draws on the "offbeat and absurdist" qualities of Ernie Bushmiller's original strips, while maintaining the modern sensibility introduced by Olivia Jaimes.

== Personal life ==
Cash described herself as gay and her work as "outwardly queer."

== Awards ==
- 2022 Ignatz Award — Outstanding Minicomic (PeePee PooPoo)
- 2023 Broken Frontier Award — Best Periodical (PeePee PooPoo)
- 2024 Eisner Award — Best Limited Series or Story Arc (PeePee PooPoo)

== Works ==
=== Graphic novels and comics ===
- Girl in the World (Silver Sprocket, 2019)
- PeePee PooPoo, 4 issues (Silver Sprocket, 2023–present)
- Adventure Time: The Bubbline College Special (Oni Press, 2025)

=== Comic strips ===
- Nancy (2026–present)
