= Richmond Lewis =

Illustrator and comics artist

Richmond Lewis is an American painter who worked briefly as a comic book colorist. She is married to comic book artist David Mazzucchelli. Coloring was a sideline from her main career as a painter, and occurred mainly because Mazzucchelli wanted to bring Lewis into his world.

== Painting career ==
Adelphi University held a solo exhibit, Paintings, of paintings by Lewis in August and September 2015.

== Comic book bibliography ==
=== Editor ===
- Rubber Blanket #1–3 (1991–1993, Rubber Blanket Press)

=== Writer/artist ===
- "If It Weren't For Men..." in Rubber Blanket #1 (art by Richmond Lewis)
- "Beyond the Last Pier" in Rubber Blanket #1 (text by David Mazzucchelli)

=== Colorist ===
- Daredevil vol. 1 #228 (1986, Marvel Comics)
- Batman #404–407: "Batman: Year One" (1987, DC Comics)
- The Shadow vol. 3 #1–6 (1987–88, DC)
- The Prisoner #3 (1988, DC)
- Batman: Legends of the Dark Knight #1–5: "Shaman" (1989–90, DC)
- Teenage Mutant Ninja Turtles: The Secret of the Ooze – Official Movie Adaptation (1991, Tundra Publishing)
- Ironwolf: Fires of the Revolution graphic novel (1992, DC)
- Turtle Soup #3–4 (1992, Mirage)
- Detective Comics Annual #8 (1995, DC)
