= Guy Gilchrist =

American cartoonist

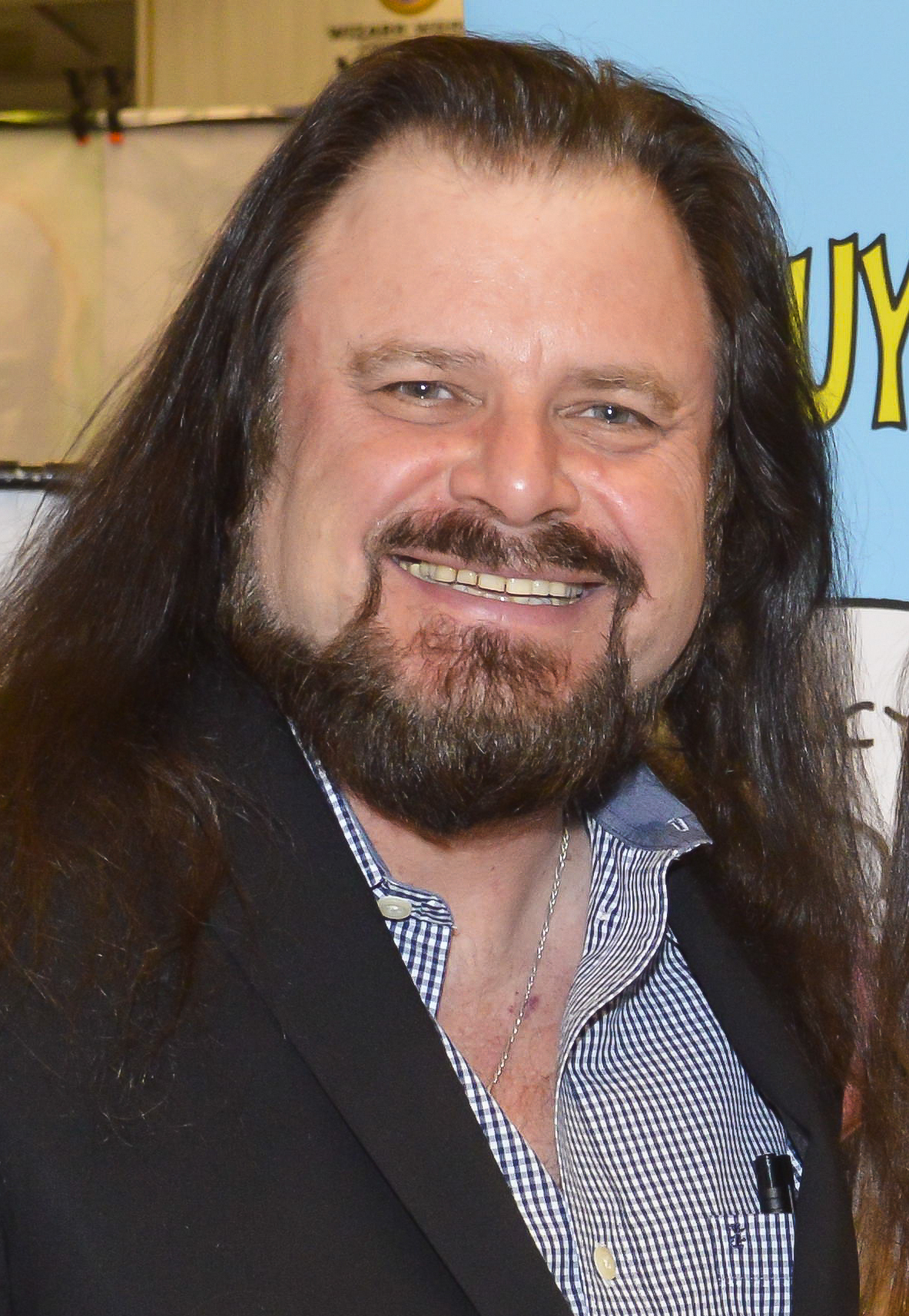
- Gilchrist at the Wizard World Comic Con in 2016
- Born: January 30, 1957 (age 69) United States
- Area: Cartoonist
- Notable works: Nancy

Guy Gilchrist (born January 30, 1957 in Connecticut) is an American writer, artist, and musician, known for his children's books and comics. With his brother Brad, he produced a newspaper comic strip featuring The Muppets from 1981 to 1986 and the comic strip Nancy from 1995 to 2018 (the last 14 years as solo writer). He is the writer/illustrator of more than 60 children's books.

== Career ==
Gilchrist started his career in the late 1970s with Superkernel Comics, a monthly comic book published by Weekly Reader Publishing in Middletown, Connecticut. In addition to The Muppets and Nancy, his comics work includes Mudpie, Your Angels Speak, Night Lights & Pillow Fights, Screams, The Poetry Guy, The Rock Channel, and Today's Dogg. He won the National Cartoonist Society Magazine Award for 1998 1999, and was nominated for their Book Illustration Award for 1987 and 1993.

At various times in the 1980s and 1990s, Gilchrist managed the publishing and/or merchandising for licenses such as The Pink Panther, Tom & Jerry, Looney Tunes, Teenage Mutant Ninja Turtles and Minnie Mouse.

Gilchrist has designed logos for Minor League Baseball teams, including the Portland Sea Dogs, New Britain Rock Cats, and Norwich Navigators. He also designed the J. League football team Shimizu S-Pulse's mascot, Palchan.
