= Mark Newgarden =

American cartoonist

- Born: August 1, 1959 (age 67) Brooklyn, NY
- Area: Cartoonist
- Notable works: Newgarden; Cheap Laffs We All Die Alone Garbage Pail Kids

Mark Newgarden (born August 1, 1959, in Brooklyn, New York) is an American underground cartoonist. His work has appeared widely, and his influential shape-shifting weekly feature Newgarden, which appeared in alternative weekly newspapers like New York Press, created a cult following for the artist.

Newgarden's work has appeared in a diverse array of venues, from the pivotal avant-garde comics album RAW to the New York Times op-ed page. His work has been exhibited at the Smithsonian Institution, the Cooper-Hewitt, the Brooklyn Museum, The Paley Center for Media, and the Institute of Contemporary Arts in London. In 1992 Newgarden was designated as one of Entertainment Weekly's annual "Faces to Watch". Newgarden has worked on various TV, film, and multimedia projects over the years for Nickelodeon, the Cartoon Network, Microsoft, Packard Bell, and others.

Newgarden attended New York's School of Visual Arts in the late 1970s/early 1980s, graduating in 1982, where his classmates included fellow cartoonists/illustrators Drew Friedman and Kaz. He came to the attention of one of his teachers, Art Spiegelman, who published him in RAW and brought him, in 1983, as a creative consultant for the Topps Company. Newgarden was part of the team that created the Garbage Pail Kids, and worked on new editions of Wacky Packages as well as scores of other satiric and novelty products.

In 1999 the cartoonist completed writing and directing four episodes of B. Happy, the first of the experimental "Web Premiere Toons" for the Cartoon Network.

His picture history of the practical joke and novelty industry, Cheap Laffs, was published by Harry N. Abrams in 2004; and We All Die Alone, a monograph collection of his comics and stories, was released from Fantagraphics Books in 2006. Bow-Wow Bugs a Bug, a wordless picture story, was published in 2007 by Harcourt.

Newgarden resides with children's illustrator and author Megan Montague Cash in an ex-funeral parlor in Williamsburg, Brooklyn.

== Bibliography ==
- Cheap Laffs: The Art of the Novelty Item (Harry N. Abrams, 2004)
- We All Die Alone (Fantagraphics Books, 2006)
- Bow-Wow Bugs A Bug (Harcourt Books, 2007)
- Bow-Wow's Nightmare Neighbors (Roaring Brook Press, 2014)
- How to Read Nancy: The Elements of Comics in Three Easy Panels with Paul Karasik (Seattle: Fantagraphics Books, 2017) ISBN 9781606993613.
