= The Challenge of Artemis =

DC Comics Wonder Woman story arc

- Book cover to "The Challenge of Artemis" graphic novel, art by Mike Deodato.
- Publisher: DC Comics
- Publication date: January – August 1995
- Genre: Superhero; Mythology
- Title(s): Wonder Woman (vol. 2) #94-100
- Main character(s): Wonder Woman, Artemis, Hippolyta

Creative team
- Writer: William Messner-Loebs
- Penciller: Mike Deodato

The Challenge of Artemis is a comic book story arc that occurred in 1995 written by William Messner-Loebs and drawn by Mike Deodato. It compiled a segment of the second volume of the DC Comics Wonder Woman comic book from issues 94 through 100 into a collected book edition.

== Storyline ==
=== A new Wonder Woman ===
After winning a contest to see who will become the new Wonder Woman in "Man's World", the Amazon Artemis makes her debut to the public. Upset and confused by the ordeal, the original Wonder Woman (Diana) dons a new black outfit and returns to her life in America. Although Artemis tries to distinguish herself from her predecessor in both New York City and Boston, her approach to various situations is seen as more violent than beneficial. Because of this, and due to Man's World's respect for Diana, Artemis often receives the cold shoulder from those she tries to help, like the Justice League. According to Superman, Batman refused to allow Artemis to sit in Diana's chair during Justice League meetings. Diana's twin sister Donna Troy resented Artemis carrying the Wonder Woman title, causing their first meeting to escalate into a heated argument. Because of the unwelcome reception, Artemis starts to see Diana as a rival and would often belittle Diana in public.

Diana continues to use her abilities to help the citizens of Boston, causing the White Magician to still view her as a threat. H tries to keep Diana preoccupied by stirring up the rivalry between Boston's mafia families while he plans his next course of action to take over the city. Unfortunately for him, Artemis continues Diana's investigation of him in her place.

Artemis meets a representative from a PR company to help her with her public likeability. Behind her back, the company has set up several battles for her with superhuman men with the help of the White Magician. However, she helps downtrodden groups like as immigrant workers and abused women and once she uncovers the truth she sets out to prove herself by single-handedly taking down Boston's biggest mob boss: Julianna Sazia. Unable to capture Julianna, Artemis destroys her army of robots and Sazia's booby-trapped mansion.

When the White Magician learns that Artemis is going to battle him, he use the life force of two women: his lover, anchorwoman Cassandra Arnold and The Cheetah, to transform himself into a giant demon, capable of defeating the Amazon. In the process, the remains of his two victims became super, savage demons with extraordinary power, obeying only The White Magician's commands. Overwhelmed, Artemis keeps up the fight valiantly until Diana is able to aid her, thanks to a disguised Circe teleporting her to her side. During the fight, Circe attempts to use her magic on the demon, but the sorcery failed, as she was tied to her false mortal identity of Donna Milton. Using the last of her power, Circe teleports the two lesser demons and herself away, leaving Diana and Artemis to battle The White Magician alone. Near death, Artemis gave the Gauntlet of Atlas (which gave its wearer 10 times their normal strength) to Diana to finish the battle. Diana beats the demonic White Magician with her tremendously enhanced strength. However, before she can finish him off, he is consumed by his own demonic powers and incinerated, leaving only a pile of smouldering ashes behind. While Circe and the Cheetah eventually return to their former selves, Cassandra Arnold has not been seen since and her whereabouts remain unknown. Once the battle is over Diana went to Artemis' side and told her she battled as a true Wonder Woman. Before dying, Artemis tells Diana to take back her title as Wonder Woman.
