= Red Hood and the Outlaws =

American comic book

- Cover for Red Hood and the Outlaws #1, art by Kenneth Rocafort and Blond.

Publication information
- Publisher: DC Comics
- Schedule: Monthly
- Format: Ongoing series
- Publication date: (vol. 1); September 2011 – March 2015 (vol. 2); August 2016 – December 2020
- No. of issues: (vol. 1): 40 (plus a #0 issue and 2 Annuals) (vol. 2): 52 (plus 1 Annual and a DC Rebirth one-shot issue)
- Main characters: (vol. 1): Red Hood; Arsenal; Starfire; (vol. 2): Red Hood; Artemis; Bizarro

Creative team
- Created by: Scott Lobdell; Kenneth Rocafort
- Written by: (vol. 1 and 2); Scott Lobdell
- Penciller(s): (vol. 1); Kenneth Rocafort (vol. 2); Dexter Soy; Pete Woods
- Inker: Blond
- Colorist: Blond

Red Hood and the Outlaws is a superhero comic book published by the comic book publishing company DC Comics. The series was commissioned in response to the growing popularity of the character of Jason Todd, a former protégé of Batman who took a turn as a villain following his resurrection. The book depicts Jason's continued adventures as the Red Hood, on a quest to seek redemption for his past crimes, forming a small team with two of his fellow anti-heroes.

Red Hood and the Outlaws debuted in 2011 as part of The New 52 event, which rebooted DC Comics' continuity, creating a fresh jumping-on point for new readers. Writer Scott Lobdell chose to dial back Jason's recent villainy for the character's first starring book, pairing him with the characters of Arsenal (Roy Harper), and Starfire, and retroactively establishing a long friendship between Jason and Roy. The title also retold Jason Todd's history in a simplified form and explored his complex relationship with his former mentor Batman and his brothers (and fellow Robins) Dick Grayson, Tim Drake, and Damian Wayne. The series also debuted a new costume for Red Hood, drawing from previous iterations, featuring his classic biker helmet look but a clear Bat-insignia on his chest, placing the Red Hood more emphatically in Batman's family of supporting characters.

The title's initial featured Lobdell as writer with art from Kenneth Rocafort, and generally received mixed reviews, drawing particular criticism for its confused continuity and accusations that its depiction of Starfire was sexist. For volume two, relaunched as part of the DC Rebirth initiative in 2016, the lineup of the Outlaws was changed to reflect the DC Trinity (Superman, Batman, and Wonder Woman), with Jason joined by Superman's clone Bizarro and Wonder Woman's friend and rival Artemis, before going solo in the retitled Red Hood: Outlaw then later retitled Red Hood.

== Plot ==
=== Vol. 1 ===
Jason Todd leads the Outlaws, a team that includes established DC character Starfire and Roy Harper, Green Arrow's ex-sidekick.

Leading up to a run-in with Killer Croc, Roy was talked out of suicide. Croc became his sponsor in recovery, but that did not keep Roy from getting into trouble. Jason, after coming back from the dead, was trained by an order of warriors known as the All Caste that taught him humility and respect. Jason was a part of the order for an unknown amount of time before he was exiled, partially by choice.

After his exile, Jason became Red Hood, returning to Gotham City where he was at odds with Starfire's ex-lover, his predecessor as Robin, Dick Grayson, as well as their mentor Batman. He soon gets tired of Gotham and leaves, organizing the group after accidentally encountering Starfire at her home base, then breaking out Roy from a Middle Eastern prison. The group travels to a tropical island as Jason catches Roy up; the two start on friendly terms. Jason learns that the All Caste have been slaughtered by a group known as the Untitled. He learns about the events from another All Caste exile named Essence, while Roy tries to jog Starfire's memory. He ends up boring her and sleeps with her.

After finding out that he is no longer a killer, Jason takes his group to All Caste headquarters where they discover that the bodies are becoming zombies. Jason destroys the bodies of his teachers and friends, after some encouragement from Roy; he swears revenge for them after the task is complete. The team is led on a wild goose chase across the globe as they come across an Untitled, who was in hiding in Colorado. Jason fights the creature alone after Starfire is attacked by Crux and Roy leaves to assist her. The Untitled tells Jason that they were set up to cross paths, but still fight him. Jason kills the creature, strengthening his resolve to take revenge. Crux's attempt to drain Starfire's power fails due to procedures performed on her during her slavery.

Roy takes down Crux long enough for Starfire to regain her composure and the three leave, taking an unconscious Crux with them. Later disguised as a doctor, Jason puts Crux into Arkham Asylum, where he says to keep Crux sedated. The group has appropriated Crux's personal modified War cruiser, which Roy instantly falls for. Essence confronts them. At first, only Jason is able to see her, knowing she set him up to fight the Untitled. When the others see her, it causes a fight within the cockpit. During the fight, the source of Essence and Ducra's powers and long life are revealed to be the same as the Untitled's. It is also revealed that they were mother and daughter. The group is able to defeat Essence by using one of Crux's weapons.

=== Vol. 2 ===
After Starfire and Arsenal left his group (Starfire went to outer space to heal her sister Blackfire, and Arsenal left to join the Titans with Dick Grayson), Red Hood finds out that Black Mask infected the Gotham City Mayor with a techno-organic virus. Batman arrives and tells him to stand down. While fighting, Jason remembers his past encounters with Batman. Jason manages to outsmart Batman by fighting dirty and shooting the mayor. Over at the news, it is revealed that Red Hood shot Batman with an antidote and Batman confronts him. Batman asks him why did he not tell him, and Jason retorted that Batman did not trust him and says he needs to act like a criminal in order to take down crime bosses. Batman reluctantly relents, on one condition: Jason must not kill before leaving. At the end of the issue, Jason is at a bar when a Black Mask henchmen gives him Black Mask information.

Jason Todd decides to go undercover to take down Black Mask after Black Mask infected the Gotham City Mayor with a techno-organic virus that allowed him to control the mayor before Red Hood frees him. Red Hood wants to kill Black Mask, but Batman tells Jason to do it his way. While on a mission to get an object that Black Mask wants, he is confronted by Artemis, an Amazon. Both of them fight, with Artemis overpowering Jason due to her overwhelming strength and her magical battle-ax which she can recall at will, but Jason temporarily knocks her out by tasing her with his armor.

Artemis wakes up and Jason pretends to chase her; when they are hiding under a boulder while Black Mask is firing at them, Artemis realizes he is a good guy based on him pulling his punches, and they both try to work together to defeat Black Mask. Black Mask gets a big container, which ends up with Jason Todd and Artemis chasing after him. Artemis wants to find the Bow of Ra, but they are both shocked to see a clone of Bizarro. Black Mask knocks both of them out with gas but lets Jason free (he thought Jason lured Artemis to his trap).

While seeing Bizarro, Jason buys Bizarro a Superman doll. Bizarro is watching Superman clips from Black Mask to understand what his role is as a villain, and when Artemis insults Bizarro, the latter turns angry. Jason manages to calm Bizarro by talking to him about Gotham City and his life, which impresses Artemis and Black Mask. Black Mask takes Jason to a room where he plans to control Gotham City (where Artemis is hiding to find the Bow of Ra) and reveals he knows Jason's secret identity after the assassination attempt on Red Hood/Arsenal, and uses a mind-controlled Bizarro against him.

While fighting against Bizarro, Red Hood realizes that Bizarro is holding back. Artemis comes to save Red Hood, and they both realize that Black Mask and Bizarro share a connection: when Bizarro feels pain, so does Black Mask. Artemis tries to hold off Bizarro while Jason Todd goes to his hideout. Black Mask follows Jason Todd and taunts him for still being loyal to Batman. Black Mask is about to shoot Jason in the head when Artemis and Bizarro crash in, and Black Mask telepathically makes Bizarro throw Artemis at Red Hood. Artemis and Red Hood devise a plan where they both attack Bizarro and Black Mask respectively. The overwhelming amount of pain causes Black Mask to be nearly brain dead, and he begs Red Hood to give him the cure, saying that Red Hood promised Batman he would not kill him. Red Hood declines, stating that if Black Mask was cured, then he would be back on the streets causing chaos; Red Hood destroys the cure. Artemis wants to continue on her journey to find the Bow of Ra and agrees to let Jason and Bizarro (now free of Black Mask's control) join her. In the epilogue, Batman confronts Jason over what happened with Black Mask, and lets Jason go his own way as long as he does not kill.

In issue #7, Red Hood and Artemis plan to kill Bizarro, but change after Bizarro says he wants Red Hood and Artemis to make him a better person. During a brawl in a bar, Red Hood asks Artemis what is her motivation for trying to find the Bow of Ra, and Artemis explains her history: she is an Amazon that is a different tribe called Bana-Mighdall (Amazons who worshipped Egyptian gods instead of Greek gods like Themyscira). She had a best friend (and lover) named Akila who sparred with her to be the Shim'Tar (Champion of the Bana-Mighdall). Artemis also revealed that one of her ancestors had a falling out with Queen Hippolyta, which caused Artemis' ancestors and her followers to leave. The Egyptian Pantheon agreed to take in Artemis' followers as long as they meet their terms. Artemis recalls Akila disappearing, and after a few weeks, Artemis finds Akila thrown out of the portal by an Egyptian god. It is revealed that Akila became the Shim'Tar, and when Artemis planned to leave Bana-Mighdall, the hostile nation of Qurac sent an army to destroy Bana-Mighdall (believing the Amazons had usurped their sacred homeland). Akila was forced to use the Bow of Ra to kill them, before not becoming insane. Wonder Woman arrives after hearing the destruction of Bana-Mighdall, and Artemis tries to fight her, but Wonder Woman says that Akila is the one causing the destruction. Artemis is forced to team up with Wonder Woman to kill Akila, and the Bow of Ra is lost. After hearing this story, Red Hood decides to help Artemis find the Bow of Ra.

Bizarro is taking Artemis and Red Hood on a plane to Qurac, and the terrorists fire several missiles at the trio. Bizarro takes down several terrorists before being blinded by a white light. When Red Hood wakes up and realizes the Qurac leader, General Heinle, used the Bow of Ra on them and Bizarro saved them from the heat by freezing the plane with his super-breath. Red Hood wakes up in the middle of terrorists, while Bizarro wakes up in a village pleading with him to help save them from the oppressive leader, mistaking him for Superman. Artemis wakes up to find Akila sitting in front of her, and Red Hood hallucinates seeing his past version after realizing he is in the same place where the Joker killed him.

Akila welcomes Artemis to her fellow Amazons, but it leaves Artemis uneasy due to her history. Meanwhile, Red Hood has PTSD over his death by the Joker and he kills the Joker in his mind. Bizarro takes the villagers to a mountain, where Qurac terrorists start firing at them. Bizarro gets angry, kills the terrorists, and destroys the mountain with one punch. Akila explains that Heinle acquired the Bow of Ra in Gotham City. He realized that only the Shim'Tar is able to use the Bow of Ra, and when he replicates Akila's cells to use the Bow of Ra, it brought her back, as well as bringing back the Bow of Ra. Akila asks Artemis to join her in destroying the Qurac terrorists, and Artemis accepts. Realizing that The Joker will not die in his mind, Jason willingly lets the Joker kill his past version in order to move on. It is revealed that Jason had a concussion, and Heinle is attempting to torture Jason, but deems Jason worthless and tells his men to kill him. Jason breaks free and holds a rifle to Heinle's head, where Heinle reveals that he was not the one to use the Bow of Ra because it was too dangerous (like controlling the sun). Remembering that Artemis mentioned only the Shim'tar could use it, Jason realizes that Akila was the one who used the Bow of Ra.

Akila surrounds Heinle and his forces and tells her Amazons to attack. Artemis finds Jason, and he convinces Artemis that Heinle does not have the Bow of Ra, stating if he did have the Bow of Ra, he would have used it on the Amazons. Holding Heinle at knifepoint, Heinle states he would never use the bow of Ra on his own men and asks her who hates the people of Qurac, him or Akila. Akila kills Heinle with the Bow of Ra, but before Akila could kill Red Hood and Artemis, Bizarro knocks her out by punching through the mountain. Akila punches Bizarro a few hundred feet away, and shoots a blast at Artemis, wounding her. Red Hood manages to wound Akila using his All-Blades (blades that draw on Jason's soul that can damage powerful beings). Bizarro joins Red Hood to fight against Akila, but they are no match. Artemis grabs the Bow of Ra, stating that she's the true Shim'Tar due to Nephthys saying that the Bow of Ra chose her in the past, and uses it to harm Akila. Akila is about to go supernova, so Bizarro takes Akila to space where she explodes. Artemis says she will join Jason, as she has no purpose in Qurac, and a villager states Bizarro is not breathing.

While trying to heal Bizarro, a man breaks Solomon Grundy out of prison to cause a reign of terror in Gotham. Red Hood and Artemis hear reports of Grundy rampaging across a street fair in Gotham. Both of them fight valiantly, but Grundy defeats Artemis (due to her underestimating him). Bizarro hears the fight and wakes up, and defeats Grundy before succumbing to his wounds. Jason grieves for Bizarro, saying that perhaps the Lazarus Pit can revive him, and admits that Grundy was his friend. However, they are knocked out by Lex Luthor in a Superman suit, who looks at Bizarro with interest.

Luthor plans to heal Bizarro, and he smugly tells Red Hood and Artemis that they are using his property without permission. While waiting, Red Hood admits that Bizarro was the first friend he actually made, while Artemis admits that she has grown fond of Bizarro and does not want to lose him after what happened with Akila. Luthor asks Bizarro if he remembers him (due to the original Bizarro dying in 'Forever Evil'), but Bizarro does not respond. Luthor deduces that since Bizarro is the opposite of Superman, kryptonite will heal him, and injects kryptonite into Bizarro. Luthor gives total custody of Bizarro to Jason and Artemis, and when they go to meet Bizarro, they are shocked to find that Bizarro is intelligent. Artemis is nervous about Bizarro's intelligence, and he shows Red Hood and Artemis their new lair: a similar Fortress of Solitude underneath Gotham City. In issue #15, Batwing calls Clayface, Orphan, Batwoman, and Azrael to tell them that crime has not come up three nights in a row. Suddenly, a message from the Outlaws states their services are not needed. Batwoman takes her team to confront the Outlaws, while Bizarro is coming to terms that his intelligence may only be temporary. Batwoman launches a sneak attack, and despite their valiant efforts, Red Hood, Artemis, and Bizarro are knocked out.

Batwoman and her team drop off the Outlaws at Belle Reve. Captain Boomerang tries to interrogate Red Hood, but Red Hood uses his armor to tase the remaining guards and escapes. Artemis is being analyzed by Harley Quinn, and Artemis easily defeats her. Red Hood and Artemis find Bizarro talking to Amanda Waller, where Bizarro made a deal with her: The Outlaws will help the Suicide Squad (Captain Boomerang, Killer Croc, Harley Quinn, and Deadshot) take out the main underground installation created by N.O.W.H.E.R.E. that houses dangerous alien technology, and in exchange, The Outlaws will be freed. The Outlaws and the Suicide Squad successfully complete their mission, and Waller warns them that if she ever captures them again, they will be hers forever. During the mission, the Outlaws are allowed half of the alien technology. Back in Gotham, Artemis worries that Bizarro is grown up so he will leave them, unaware that Bizarro is watching them. Bizarro is revealed to have stolen thousands of synthetic liquid kryptonite vials to retain his intelligence.

In issue #20, Artemis and Jason grow suspicious of Bizarro's recent activities and they plan to find out. Bizarro follows a thug into a room full of henchmen and he uses gas to knock them out. He plans to kill them but stops just in time. Jason (having followed Bizarro by using his cloaking suit) congratulates Bizarro for not crossing the line. Artemis goes into Bizarro's room and discovers the synthetic kryptonite lab just as Bizarro catches her. Bizarro admits his addiction and his fear of losing his intelligence and begs Artemis to help him. Feeling pity, Artemis has a heart-to-heart discussion and they destroy the synthetic kryptonite containers. Jason is infiltrating Penguin's headquarters, but the Penguin finds out. Before The Penguin can capture Jason, there is a blackout and Jason escapes. It is revealed that the more Bizarro uses synthetic kryptonite, the more he hallucinates a doll of Superman, and he still has his synthetic kryptonite supply (using asthma inhalers). Artemis goes to Lexcorp to confront Lex Luthor.

In issue #22, Artemis confronts Lex Luthor, and he admits that. although he only released Bizarro to the Outlaws for an experiment, he has become attached to Bizarro. Bizarro starts losing his intelligence and calls Jason to take him home. Jason agrees and Bizarro reveals that he is scared that he will lose his intelligence, but Jason assures him that it will be okay as they look at the stars. At Nanna Gun's house, Jason reads the letters Nanna Gun's granddaughter gave him. It is revealed that Willis Todd (Jason's father, who is a drug dealer) fell in love with Jason's mom and gave her drugs. This caused her to become a drug addict and she chooses to live with Willis. As time went by, Jason's mom became addicted to drugs and beer, and Jason was born but had to go to the hospital for medical conditions. In order to support his family, Willis became a henchman for numerous criminals like Mr. Freeze, Two-Face, and Riddler. His last job was to be the fall guy for Penguin, and while Penguin was free, Willis had to be in prison for at least 20 years. He hears that his wife dies and writes one last letter to Jason before being subjected to an experiment. In the present day, Jason fights off criminals and Penguin hires a sniper to shoot him but stops when he sees Jason digging up a casket. Jason finds the casket angry, and screams "I don't care!" The next night, Jason finds Penguin at a party that is supposed to be dedicated to him and angrily beats him down. Jason reveals that he is Willis' son before shooting him in the face with a blank. Batman finds out and goes out to confront Jason. Meanwhile, Artemis finds that their base is attacking her, and it is revealed that due to Bizarro's intelligence regressing, it now perceives her as an enemy. Jason goes outside, where he sees an explosion in their base.

Batman starts brutally beating up Red Hood, with Red Hood taunting Batman that he hated the Joker, yet he hits Jason harder than he hits The Joker, as well as explaining that with Penguin gone, no more lives would be ruined. Bizarro knocks down Batman and takes Red Hood to their ruined headquarters. Bizarro decides to open up a portal and send in the whole headquarters to prevent destruction in Gotham City. Artemis kisses Red Hood before she is sucked in, and Batman finds Red Hood and defeats him soundly. Batman plans to take in Red Hood when Roy Harper/Arsenal shoots Batman with an arrow and takes Red Hood to safety. While healing, Arsenal invites Red Hood on a lead to find a gang called the Underlife. At the end, Arsenal tells Jason that he has to go to the Sanctuary to deal with his addiction and PTSD. A few days later, Jason gets a new costume and haircut, and is on a bus when he finds a woman named Melissa Mitchell (an FBI agent) on the ground bleeding; he takes her to a bus. The bus is stopped by a group of gang members who want the Feeb (Melissa). Jason gets out and brutally beats them; when he returns to the bus, Melissa recognizes Jason as Red Hood who shot Penguin and pulls out her gun. She does not shoot him after Jason points out the law did not save her partner. Jason finds Underlife's gang members in a police station with a dirty cop, beats all the gang members, and kills the dirty cop. Jason gives Melissa her partner's badge, and Melissa reluctantly agrees to help Jason.

Jason goes to a diner to confront a gang member who works for the Underlife, and he beats most of the members in the diner. One gang member injects himself with chemicals to make him look bigger, but Bruce Wayne knocks him out. Bruce says that The Penguin did not die yet, so Jason still did not break their deal. Jason asks if Bruce is here to criticize him, but Bruce says that Roy is dead. Jason is shocked at first but hides his sadness. Bruce and Jason make amends and Bruce says that Jason can do whatever he wants as long as it is not in Arkham or Gotham. Jason leaves a last voicemail for Roy, saying that Roy was his best friend. Jason then goes to a town called Appleton to make his move against the Underlife, while someone is spying on him.

While going to Appleton, Red Hood is attacked by the townspeople and knocked out. He wakes up to see a creature similar to Solomon Grundy about to kill him, and after a brief fight, he kills the creature. Batwoman appears behind him, but Jason briefly fights her before teaming up to fight against zombie-like people. Batwoman tries to apologize to Red Hood about sending him to Amanda Waller, but Jason assures her Bizarro was the one who orchestrated the events. After defeating a robot that was in charge of controlling the Appleton town, Renee Montoya takes Jason and Batwoman southward to a prison called Hierve el Agua to find a man called Solitary. Jason goes to Mexico to find the prison where he sees a door cut open by an ax, and thinks Artemis and Bizarro are alive. Wingman, a vigilante, ambushes Red Hood when he is knocked out by a brick. The bricks somehow free Jason, and he meets a dog who shows him secret bio-labs, more clones of zombies, and Bunker when Solitary appears behind Jason. Meanwhile, Artemis and Bizarro are revealed to be alive but in a different reality.

Jason frees Bunker, defeats Wingman, and kills Solitary. Later, he goes to Roy's grave and swears vengeance on Roy's killer. Jason takes control of the Iceberg Lounge and hires Sister Su, Bunker and Wingman as his sidekicks and bodyguards. Batman arrives and tries to arrest Jason, but Jason counters that if Batman does that, then his identity will be exposed. It is revealed that Penguin survived, and Jason locked him up to let Penguin see his criminal empire crumble. Penguin activates his contingency plan: when he has not been heard in a week, a group of villains called The Five Acres will free him. The Five Acres managed to find Penguin, but they are all ambushed by Sister Su and Jason.

Jason and Sister Su kill the Five Acres. Later, after Jason goes on a date with Isabel Ardilla in Paris, Jason goes to a gang hideout called the Euro-Blac. He antagonizes them, then leaves (in hopes of making them angry at Penguin, not Jason). While at the Iceberg Lounge, Bunker releases Penguin and is furious that Jason kept Penguin a prisoner. Jason's dog attacks Penguin, and in the ensuing chaos Penguin and Bunker escape. Jason decides to give up the Iceberg Lounge for Sister Su in order to give her a second chance, and leaves Wingman (who turns out to be Jason's father still alive) for his own path. He leaves his dog to Isabel, and receives a message from Lex Luthor.

Jason is assigned by Dr. Shay Veritas to teach Devour, Babe in Arms, Zombie Mom, DNA, and Cloud 9. Ma Gunn is shrunk into a bottle, and Bizarro and Artemis are stuck in a different realm. Jason and his team successfully free a boy who was turned into a Doomsday creature, and Artemis sees the superman doll talking. Veritas tells Jason she needs his help, as her building is under siege, and Artemis and Bizarro are freed into their world after returning Mama Gunn to normal (the headquarters finally died). It is revealed that the AI Bizarro did not want to die when their headquarters was being blown up, so it transferred its conscious to the superman doll. When they return to the real world, they see an ominous symbol in the sky.

In issue #40, Red Hood and his students enter The Block, a research development complex located in the center of the Earth to find Lex Luthor. Red Hood and his student Clpid 9are caught by gunmen, but Cloud 9 uses her wind powers to disarm the men. While walking, Red Hood sees a door, and sees Artemis and Bizarro. Suddenly, Bizarro creates a thunder clap which knocks Red Hood out.

In issue #41, Red Hood remembers his conversation with Arsenal about Bizarro and Artemis. It is revealed that Bizarro and Artemis are mind controlled by an unknown being, and Clara briefly holds them off before escaping with Red Hood. While hiding in a ventilation duct from Bizarro and Artemis, Red hood wakes up but Bizarro hears them and rips open the ventilation duct. The rest of Red Hood's students help save Red hood, and while fighting Red Hood kisses Artemis. The person in Artemis exclaims in disgust, but seeing that they're surrounded, leaves Artemis' body. While going in the building, it turns out a boy named Vessel was controlling Artemis and Bizarro. Vessel revealed that Lex Luthor sent him after Red Hood, until deciding that Vessel was too uncontrollable. Vessel planned to create a bomb using Deadman's powers and clones to control the world, but his plans are thwarted by Mama Gunn (returned to size by Zombie Mom) and the rest of the team. In the end, Red Hood takes the rest of his students and his partners to celebrate at Mama Gunn's house.

In issues #49 and 50, Red Hood and Artemis admits their feelings to each other but decide to not be a couple yet. Red Hood helps Duela Dent reconnect with society, and all three of them part ways, with Red Hood returning to Gotham City.

== Reception ==
=== Vol. 1 ===
Reviews of Red Hood and the Outlaws have been negative, with complaints often being filed towards Lobdell and Rocafort's interpretation of Starfire. Most reviews disliked how she was represented, although her portrayal has been defended. Jesse Schedeen of IGN remarked that Kenneth Rocafort's penciling affords Scott Lobdell the opportunity to emphasize Starfire's sex appeal: "She alone seems to have been completely rebooted for the relaunch". Many critics and fans complain the clunky plot, Jason's character being too similar to Dick Grayson, and the lack of characterization.

Mathew Peterson of MajorSpoilers.com stated that a "juvenile treatment of sexual matters here renders one of the main characters into nothing more than a punch line, and in a book with only three characters, that's unforgivable", referring specifically to its sexualized portrayal of Starfire as a "'perfect-10 love doll imaginary girlfriend'". Andrew Hunsaker of Craveonline.com said that writer Lobdell's take on Tamaraneans (Starfire's race) "has reduced Princess Koriand'r of Tamaran into essentially a highly advanced Real Doll. Complete with installing a lack of memory of anything related to humanity". Hunsaker further opined that it "seems as if Lobdell has taken great pains to strip all the emotional motivation behind Kori's gregarious outlook and reduce her to nothing more than a sex vessel. It is pretty insulting not only to women, but to male intelligence to boot". Hunsaker concluded that it "makes you want to punch the entire comic book industry".

Laura Hudson, editor-in-chief of ComicsAlliance, wrote that "there's a difference between writing a female character as sexually liberated, and writing her as wish-fulfillment sex object, but Starfire sure is making a case for the latter in [a] charmless scene" wherein Starfire defends her offer to have sex with one of the characters by saying that "love has nothing to do with it". Hudson also cited this characterization of Starfire in a later article, remarking that portrayals of women as sexual objects "don't support sexually liberated women; they undermine them".

Houston Press writer Jef With One F countered that "you're not dealing with the point of view of someone who grew up here with our Western social norms" and contended that Starfire as portrayed in Red Hood and the Outlaws is "not a sex toy, she's someone from a very different culture attracted to two specific men".

Newsarama included Red Hood and the Outlaws in its list of "10 Worst Titles of DC's New 52 / DC YOU Era". Oscar Maltby writes: "Always explosive but rarely coherent narratively, Red Hood and the Outlaws was lurid, puerile and occasionally even embarrassing". On Comicbookroundup, the first series has an overall average of 6.5 out of 10.

=== Vol. 2 ===
The relaunch of the title featuring Red Hood, Artemis, and Bizarro received generally positive reviews, with praise for the artwork, and criticism aimed towards the story and dialogue. However, critics noted the second volume improved on the original series. According to Comic Book Roundup, the series overall has an average rating of 7.8 out of 10. Mark Stack of Comics Bulletin writes, "[t]he dialogue is on-the-nose, the flashbacks oddly-paced, and there's some weird out-of-character stuff with Batman. Red Hood looks good to the detriment of Batman... and it strains credibility given how far out of its way this book goes to try defining these characters".

== Collected editions ==
This series has been collected in the following trade paperbacks:

| # | Title | Material collected | Pages | Publication date | ISBN | Notes |
The New 52
| 1 | REDemption | Red Hood and the Outlaws #1–7 | 160 | November 13, 2012 | 978-1401237127 | |
| 2 | The Starfire | Red Hood and the Outlaws #8–14 | 160 | July 2, 2013 | 978-1401240905 | |
| 3 | Death of the Family | Red Hood and the Outlaws #0, 15–18; Teen Titans (vol. 4) #16; Batman (vol. 2) #17 | 160 | December 3, 2013 | 978-1401244125 | |
| 4 | League of Assassins | Red Hood and the Outlaws #19–24, Annual #1 | 176 | June 17, 2014 | 978-1401246365 | |
| 5 | The Big Picture | Red Hood and the Outlaws #27–31; DC Universe Presents #17–18 | 160 | December 16, 2014 | 978-1401250485 | |
| 6 | Lost and Found | Red Hood and the Outlaws #32–34, Annual #2 | 144 | June 23, 2015 | 978-1401253424 | |
| 7 | Last Call | Red Hood and the Outlaws #35–40; Futures End #1 | 144 | January 12, 2016 | 978-1401258566 | |
| 1 | The New 52 Omnibus | Red Hood and the Outlaws #0–27, Annual #1; Teen Titans (vol. 4) #16; Batman (vol. 2) #17 | 736 | October 16, 2018 | 978-1401284664 | |
Red Hood/Arsenal
| 1 | Open for Business | Red Hood / Arsenal #1–6; Convergence: Titans #2 | 144 | April 5, 2016 | 978-1401261542 | |
| 2 | Dancing with the Devil's Daughter | Red Hood / Arsenal #7–13 | 184 | October 18, 2016 | 978-1401264895 | |
DC Rebirth
| 1 | Dark Trinity | Red Hood and the Outlaws #1–6; Red Hood and the Outlaws: Rebirth #1 | 168 | May 2, 2017 | 978-1401268756 | |
| 2 | Who Is Artemis? | Red Hood and the Outlaws #7–11 | 128 | October 10, 2017 | 978-1401273996 | |
| 3 | Bizarro Reborn | Red Hood and the Outlaws #12–18, Annual #1 | 208 | April 24, 2018 | 978-1401278373 | |
| 4 | Good Night Gotham | Red Hood and the Outlaws #19–25 | 184 | November 6, 2018 | 978-1401284886 | |
Red Hood: Outlaw
| 1 | Requiem for an Archer | Red Hood: Outlaw #26–31, Annual #2 | 208 | June 25, 2019 | 978-1401292850 | |
| 2 | Prince of Gotham | Red Hood: Outlaw #32–36, Annual #3 | 168 | December 3, 2019 | 978-1401295103 | |
| 3 | Generation Outlaw | Red Hood: Outlaw #37–42 | 152 | June 30, 2020 | 978-1779502520 | |
| 4 | Unspoken Truths | Red Hood: Outlaw #43–50 | 224 | March 9, 2021 | 978-1779505934 | |
