= Wonder Woman (Artemis of Bana-Mighdall) =

Fictional Amazon superheroine

Artemis of Bana-Mighdall
- Artemis, as she appeared during the crossover Trial of the Amazons (2022). Art by Jen Bartel.

Publication information
- Publisher: DC Comics
- First appearance: Wonder Woman vol. 2 #90 (September 1994); As Wonder Woman: Wonder Woman vol. 2 #93 (January 1995)
- Created by: William Messner-Loebs (writer); Mike Deodato (artist)

In-story information
- Alter ego: Artemis of Bana-Mighdall
- Species: Amazon
- Place of origin: Bana-Mighdall
- Team affiliations: Amazons; Hellenders; Tartarus; Justice League; Red Hood and the Outlaws
- Partnerships: Wonder Woman; Red Hood; Bizarro
- Notable aliases: Wonder Woman; Artemis Grace; Javelin; Requiem; Shim'Tar; Polemarch
- Abilities: See list: Trained in high levels of hand-to-hand combat; Expertise in a wide array of weapons; Ageless; Superhuman strength, speed, durability, stamina, agility, reflexes; Self-sustenance; Some knowledge of low level sorceries; Fluent in demon language; Magic weapons: Gauntlets of Atlas, Sandals of Hermes, Armor of Shim'Tar

Wonder Woman (Artemis of Bana-Mighdall) is an Amazon superheroine, a comic book character published by DC Comics. The character was created by William Messner-Loebs and Mike Deodato, and debuted in Wonder Woman (vol. 2) #90 (September 1994) as a rival to Princess Diana of Themyscira. Artemis had briefly succeeded Diana as the new Wonder Woman, but was later killed while assuming the role, fulfilling a prophecy of Wonder Woman dying. After her death, Artemis was sent to the Underworld, but eventually returned to the world of the living.

== Publication history ==
Artemis, as she first appeared in Wonder Woman #90 (September 1994). Art by Mike Deodato.

Artemis of Bana-Mighdall debuted in Wonder Woman vol. 2 #90 (September 1994) and was created by writer William Messner-Loebs and artist Mike Deodato.

== Fictional character history ==
=== Amazon tribe background ===
As described in her comic book appearances, Artemis was born an Amazon as a member of the Egyptian tribe of Bana-Mighdall, who migrated from Greece to various European and Middle Eastern countries before settling in Egypt. Three thousand years ago, the two Amazon Queens (Hippolyta and Antiope) split the Amazon nation in two. Hippolyta's tribe traveled to the isolated island of Themyscira (otherwise known as Paradise Island) to live immortal lives to protect the doorway to the Underworld called Doom's Doorway. Antiope's tribe was never given immortality and were forced to mate with common men to guarantee their tribe's survival over the centuries. As they had renounced their Olympian gods once the two Queens parted ways, they eventually began to assimilate various religions and goddesses from the many lands they traveled to. Some of those included the goddesses Isis, Mammitu, Bast, and Neith. It was in Egypt that they finally built the city of Bana-Mighdall, which in their language translates to "The Temple of Women". Thanking the Amazons for their worship, one of their new goddesses created a powerfully consistent sandstorm to surround and protect their city from any outsiders who could not be trusted, or "ariadnas". The Bana-Mighdallian Amazons began an uneasy trade with outside cities to create commerce. They would exchange custom-made weapons and their warrior skills for goods and slaves for breeding.

=== Enter: Artemis ===
Over the centuries the Bana-Mighdallian weapons and services became above par and were in much demand. This way of living continued until the late 20th century. It was into this period that Artemis was born. As a child, Artemis was raised in poverty among her tribe, running naked through barren hills and often hungry. By the time she was 10 years old she was trained to carry 50 lbs. packs silently across night battlefields. At one point in her teens she briefly left her people to find a new life in Man's World, allying with Ra's al Ghul as he launched a plan to decimate the world with stolen nuclear missiles acquired with the aid of a salvaged Bizarro, claiming to be eighteen rather than fourteen and proving herself as a trained warrior by defeating several of Ra's forces. After being defeated by Batman, Artemis eventually turned against Ra's after leading him to Themyscira with the intention of allowing him to use it as a base, realising during the attack that she could not cause the deaths of her own people. She returned home after being inspired by a brief meeting with Superman, opting to return to a life of relative tranquility.

Eventually Wonder Woman found their city while searching for the villain the Cheetah, who had stolen her golden Lasso of Truth. As the Bana-Mighdallian's original Themyscirian language had changed over time to incorporate Middle Eastern dialects, Diana had a hard time communicating with the newly found Amazons. Eventually a battle took place between her and the Bana-Mighdallian's chief warrior or Shim'Tar. Soon an enraged Olympian god Hermes, who was in love with Diana, took vengeance on the desert Amazons for attacking his beloved, and the city of Bana-Mighdall was destroyed. Homeless, the remaining Amazons eventually took up with the witch Circe who was a nemesis of Wonder Woman. It was agreed that in exchange for their servitude during the events of the War of the Gods, Circe would grant them immortality and a new home to call their own. It was decided that since the Themyscirian princess was the initial cause of their city being destroyed, they would take over her Amazon city instead. Though only fourteen years old at this time, Artemis spoke before the Queen and Council to protest the planned attack as she felt that Amazons must not war against each other. Her cries were ignored and the attack was undertaken.

=== Amazons united ===
During the attack on Themyscira, Circe showed her true colors and teleported the island into a dimension of demons in order for both tribes to be destroyed. The two tribes put aside their rivalry temporarily and fought the demons to ensure the Amazon survival. Though only a few months passed in the real world, the time the Amazons spent in the demon dimension lasted ten years. Discovering that Circe had made her island home disappear, Wonder Woman forced her to return it to its rightful place. Once this was done Wonder Woman learned about the invasion, the demon war, and the Amazon truce. She eventually met Artemis who was now in her mid-20s. The two got off to a rocky start, but Diana could see that Artemis' heart was true.

=== Wonder Woman ===
Artemis as Wonder Woman and Diana in alternate costume. Illustration by Mike Deodato

Due to being in the demon dimension, Hippolyta began to see visions of the future. One of those visions included Wonder Woman dying. Keeping this to herself, she called for a new Contest for the title of Wonder Woman, claiming that she felt that Diana had proven inadequate in the role despite Diana's insistence that the world outside was more complicated than they had imagined. Initially excluding the new Amazons, Hippolyta submitted to a vote on the whole to include them at Diana's behest. Through some mystical managing on Hippolyta's part, Artemis eventually won the Contest and became the new Wonder Woman. Hippolyta then declared to both tribes that she considered Artemis her own daughter for winning the Contest, and during her entire tenure as Wonder Woman Artemis wore Diana's tiara. As gifts to aid her in her new mission, Artemis was given several magical objects. The Gauntlet of Atlas which increased its wearer's strength by ten times, The Sandals of Hermes which gave the gift of speed and flight and the golden Lasso of Truth which forced anyone tied by it to speak only the truth.

Although Artemis tried diligently to distinguish herself from her predecessor in both New York City and Boston, this proved to be rather hard to do. Her approach to various situations were often seen as more violent than beneficial. Because of this, and due to Man's World's respect of Diana, Artemis often would receive the cold shoulder from those she tried to help, extending even to her brief time in the Justice League. Superman once commented to Diana that Batman refused to allow Artemis to sit in Diana's chair during Justice League meetings. Diana's twin sister Donna Troy even showed resentment toward Artemis carrying the Wonder Woman title, which caused their first meeting to escalate into a heated argument.

She later met a representative from a public relations company who agreed to help Artemis with her public likeability. What Artemis was not aware of was that the company, with the help of the White Magician, had set up several battles for her with superhuman men. However, she ultimately helped downtrodden groups such as immigrant workers and abused women. Once she uncovered this truth she set about to prove herself by single-handedly taking down Boston's biggest mob boss: Julianna Sazia. Unable to capture Julianna, Artemis destroyed her army of robots and Sazia's booby-trapped mansion. Later, Artemis' arrogance gained the better of her, and she died in a battle with the White Magician who gained extreme power while accidentally being transported to Hell. Thus, Hippolyta's vision of Wonder Woman dying was fulfilled.

=== Requiem ===
After Artemis's death as Wonder Woman, her soul was sent to a form of Hell. While in the Underworld Artemis became a figurative bride to one of the thirteen ruling Princes of Hell named Dalkriig-Hath. As his bride Artemis became part of Dalkriig-Hath's legion of demonic warriors. Eventually Artemis was able to kill Dalkriig-Hath and regain access to the world of the living. Wanting to separate herself from her former title as Wonder Woman, Artemis used her skills learned in Tartarus to her advantage and joined a group of demon-hunting heroes called the Hellenders. Based in Waverly, Pennsylvania, she was assigned the codename Javelin, which she quickly rejected for the name Requiem. Artemis developed a romantic interest in fellow Hellender Sure-Shot, a master of arsenal and projection weapons. This interest was dropped though when she discovered that Sure-Shot's perceived self-assuredness was brought on by psychotropic drugs which were meant to keep various Hellender members fearless while battling the likes of demons and ghouls.

She also befriended a woman by the name of Henrietta Jessup, who went by the codename Sojourner. Though Sojourner did not have any warrior skills to speak of, Artemis stood by her friend and tutored her as a novice Amazon. For unknown reasons Artemis left the Hellenders and aided Diana in Gateway City as a fellow crime fighter. She also became close friends with Cassie Sandsmark. Artemis' previous teacher/mentor relationship with Sojourner was later expanded as Wonder Woman asked Artemis to take Cassie on as a new pupil. It was with Artemis' Amazon training lessons that Cassie was able to hone her skills in becoming the new Wonder Girl. Later still, Artemis' teacher/mentor resume would expand even more to even include the combat training of Supergirl. It was during the initial meeting with Supergirl that Artemis would gain her revenge against Batman for his hostile attitude towards her when she attempted to join the Justice League. Artemis pinned Batman in hand-to-hand combat, but was eventually subdued with one of Batman's tranquilizer darts.

The Underworld demon Belyllioth, who served as master over some of the Myrmidon demons, later contacted Artemis to inform her of an unrest in Tartarus. With the death of the demon Dalkriig-Hath, the remaining twelve princes of Hell were battling for dominion over the dead demon's realm. As Dalkriig-Hath's widow, Artemis was, by rights, next in line to rule his region of Hades. Artemis ended the demonic war by presenting herself before the twelve demon rulers to officially be granted her former husband's station. After the blessing ceremony was given, Artemis revealed that the blessing was actually given to Belyllioth, who was magically disguised in Artemis' form. Angered by her deception, the twelve princes of Hell vowed vengeance against Artemis upon her return to Hades. Fortunately for Artemis, her devoted friend Belyllioth (now officially one of the thirteen rulers of Tartarus) has sworn her allegiance and protection to the Amazon for eternity.

During John Byrne's time on the Wonder Woman comic, he insinuated that Artemis previously had an affair with the New God Kanto. This fell out of established history as no prior connection of Artemis or the Amazons to Apokolips had been established until Darkseid's invasion of Themyscira shortly after Artemis' death. Because of this the only other time Artemis could have met Kanto would have been before the Banas invaded Paradise Island, leaving Artemis to be between infancy to fourteen years of age. Thus she would have been much too young to have had a relationship with the grown adult.

=== Shim'Tar ===
After some time, Artemis returned to Themyscira to aid her Amazon sisters in the uneasy living conditions they continued to work in due to lingering animosities between the two tribes. Civil war eventually broke out between the two groups of Amazons, leaving Artemis to take up the title of her tribe's chief warrior, or Shim'Tar. She did this in the hopes of ending the war and to guide both tribes to peaceful negotiations. As Shim'Tar, Artemis battled Hippolyta, who was acting as the newest Wonder Woman. During their battle, Artemis reminded Hippolyta that the Themyscirian queen was not given the armor of Wonder Woman out of honor, but rather as a punishment for causing the death of not only Artemis, but of her daughter Diana as well. Ultimately coming to her senses, Hippolyta finally forgave the Amazons of Bana-Mighdall for their previous transgressions, and joined her daughter Diana on the battlefield. Together, Hippolyta and Diana renounced their crowns, leaving the island without a structured government in the hopes of ending the needless slaughter brought on by the war. They were successful, and Artemis and the Themyscirian Philippus were later voted to be co-rulers of the island. Philippus was given the title of Chancellor and Archon Eponymous, whereas Artemis was given the title of Polemarch. It is explained that Archon Eponymous equates to the Civic Office of a Presidential title, whereas the position of Polemarch translates to War Leader, similar to the position of Commander-In-Chief.

As co-ruler Artemis helped usher in a new age for the Amazons by inviting outworlders to commune on Themyscira. This included both Earth-bound peoples as well as alien races. Together with her people, Artemis learned about advanced alien technology and new battle skills. Not all those contacted met the invitation warmly. The U.S. government posted warships along the U.S./Themyscira border. Later the American president, Jonathan Vincent Horne, called a meeting with Artemis, Philippus and Diana. He had his White House Chief of Staff, Mr. Ables, inform them that the U.S. government would ease the blockade if the Amazons agreed to transfer blueprints on how to create their own Purple Ray. The trio gave a firm "no" as an answer, telling the President that they feared the U.S. government would use the Purple Ray as a weapon. Because of this tensions between the two nations remained.

=== Amazon disappearance ===
Through the machinations of an A.I. satellite called Brother Eye, a military strike was made against Themyscira in an attempt at Amazon genocide. A large swarm of OMAC units were sent to the island and began to attack the Amazons as part of the events of Infinite Crisis. Because of this, as well as the many previous attacks against the island since Diana had become Wonder Woman, it was decided by Artemis and Philippus that the entire island of Themyscira and all of its inhabitants (sans Diana) would be transported to a hidden dimension via the Olympian and Bana-Mighdallian goddesses. Artemis and the remaining Amazons thrive in this dimension for a year's time in peace.

The witch Circe later entered the Amazons' protected dimension and revived Hippolyta from death. Circe informed the Amazons that Diana was being illegally detained by the U.S. government and tortured until she gave them the secrets of the Purple Ray. Because of this, the Amazons agreed to give Hippolyta her royal title back, and followed her instructions to invade Washington, D.C., which brought about the events of Amazons Attack!. Artemis and Philippus were assigned to oversee the battle, but soon lost faith in Hippolyta when they discovered some of her actions against Man's World proved to be less than honorable. Due to their failure to follow through in stopping Hippolyta during the war, a disguised Granny Goodness cursed all of the Amazons by erasing their memories and scattering them across the globe with false personas. Under her false persona Artemis then is shown wearing civilian travel clothes near the Great Wall of China.

With the return of the Olympian gods, Zeus revives the Amazon's memories several months after their memory wipes and has them return to Themyscira. Artemis is not shown to be part of the returning Amazons though. Instead, Artemis is kidnapped during her memory loss period by the slave leader Mr. Smyth. By the time her memory is returned to her she finds herself shackled, drugged and placed in a copy of her former Requiem costume. While she is his captive, Smyth drugs, tortures, and attempts to brainwash Artemis, which she is able to resist through force of will. She is freed by the sympathizing banshee villain Jeannette. Artemis then learns that she and other Amazons of Bana-Mighdall have been captured and sent to Smyth's Devil's Island by the U.S. government due to the war crimes they committed against the United States during the events of Amazons Attack. Despite this Artemis convinces several members of the mercenary team Secret Six to aid her in also freeing her fellow Amazons. After this is accomplished Smyth is killed by a member of Secret Six before Artemis could exact her revenge upon him.

Once freed, Artemis and the remaining Amazons gathered their dead and were provided a magical transport back to Themyscira where they were greeted by Hippolyta and Philippus. Upon return of the island Artemis discovers the Amazons are now ruled by Achilles and the mad Amazon Alkyone. She takes immediate issue with Themyscira's newly structured monarchy. Artemis helps organize a party to dethrone Alkyone and is surprised to discover that Achilles and his people are more than willing to help in the coup. The coup is successful and a new government structure is created for the island once again.

=== DC Rebirth ===
Artemis with Red Hood and Bizarro on the variant cover of Red Hood and the Outlaws (vol. 2) #22 (July 2018). Art by Guillem March.

An alternate version of Artemis is later introduced in the new DC Comics Universe as part of Red Hood and the Outlaws, along with Bizarro. Born as a full fledged Amazon to another Amazon and raised in Bana-Mighdall, Artemis was trained from a very young age to be the Shim-Tar. In addition to her enhanced Amazon strength, and fighting skills, she also possesses an overly large sized battle axe that contains magical properties, which also appears when Artemis calls upon it. Artemis initially meets Red Hood in a train car where Black Mask sends Red Hood to steal a powerful weapon—supposedly the ancient Bow of Ra. Also looking for the Bow of Ra, both Artemis and Red Hood instead discover that the weapon they find is a clone of Superman. The two take in the clone and attempt to civilize the childlike Superman clone—which Red Hood dubs Bizarro. Over time, Artemis begins to show a romantic affection for Red Hood and a motherly affection for Bizarro. When Wonder Woman is mentioned, Artemis displays a dislike for her. It is later revealed that the two Amazons come from different tribes: Diana being Themyscirian and Artemis being from Bana-Mighdall. When Bana-Mighdall was destroyed, Diana was there to rescue Artemis from the rubble. Despite this aid, Artemis held a grudge against the Themyscirian Amazons for being distant from the splintered tribe. Now out on her own in Man's World, Artemis forms a bond with Red Hood and agrees to aid him and Bizarro on some of their assignments. Through these adventures, Artemis steadily keeps track of the Bow of Ra's location, finally discovering that it was transported to Qurac.

Following the Bow's trail, she discovers that her best friend and former lover, the Amazon Akila, has returned from the dead and is now in possession of the Bow of Ra. Akila tries to explain to Artemis that her plans to destroy Qurac with it is an honorable feat due to Qurac's prior assault on Bana-Mighdall. Artemis struggles with her loyalties before siding against Akila, telling her that the station of Shim'Tar is above the act of human genocide. Defeating her, Artemis becomes the new holder of the Bow of Ra, and default Shim'Tar to the remaining Amazons of Bana-Mighdall. She leaves her people, though, to remain teammates with Red Hood and Bizarro in Gotham City. Artemis is also revealed to have selected Grace to be her alias surname. Jason and Artemis shared a kiss but felt they should stay friends.

Artemis is tasked by her tribe to bring Yara Flor due to a prophecy that she will cause destruction to the Amazons. She meets with Cassie Sandsmark who is also tasked by her Greek Amazon tribe and they fight, but they encounter Yara Flor's tribeswomen who want to talk to them.

In "Trial of the Amazons", Artemis kills Hippolyta and is tried for murder and sent to prison. However, Artemis helps the rest of the Amazons when monsters attack, but escape. Donna Troy and Cassie Sandsmark are tasked to find her and take her to justice. In Artemis Wanted #1, it is revealed that Hippolyta wanted Artemis to kill her and keep it a secret because the Gods would not help the Amazons, so Hippolyta wanted to ascend into godhood by death so she tasked Artemis to kill her in order for Hippolyta to help the Amazons in future battles. Donna Troy and Cassie defend Artemis against Queen Faruka, and Artemis is welcomed back to the Amazons.

== Powers and abilities ==
Artemis has superhuman level strength, able to rip through steel, superhuman speed and reflexes. She is a master hand-to-hand fighter combining many assimilated fighting techniques and is a weapons expert in both the use and manufacturing of weapons (favoring bow and arrows, but ranging from blades to automatic weapons). Due to the result of a spell cast by Amazonian mystic Magala, Artemis possesses and has retained a great deal of Diana's overall physical dynamism, which should've dissipated after the contest of the mantle of Wonder Woman had passed yet it still persists to this day.

Artemis has eternal youth which was provided by the witch Circe to her and the rest of her Bana-Mighdall sisterhood. This form of immortality does not provide resistance from harm or death. She possesses knowledge of low-level sorcery learned in the Underworld including:

- Self-transmogrification, using the phrase "Punji Baal T'Alemi Dar Baharin" to change into another person/creature and then saying the spell backward to return to her true form. This spell uses up a large amount of life force.
- Spell reversal, which she used to transform demonically transformed were-creatures back into their human forms.
- Demonic sensing, allowing her to know when a demon is masking their appearance as that of a human.

As of the DC Rebirth comics revamp, Artemis retains Themyscirian Amazon level strength, durability, agility and skill despite being an Amazon from Bana-Mighdall, which is different from her much lower peak human level physicality from before the revamp.

=== Weapons ===
While wearing the Gauntlet of Atlas, Artemis' strength is increased 10 times her normal level. Using the Sandals of Hermes, Artemis possesses the ability to fly and run at high speeds. The Armor of Shim'Tar provides limited invulnerability and other unknown magical traits. As of DC Rebirth, Artemis is given a large magical battle axe that comes to her when called, and the Bow of Ra.

== Other versions ==
=== The Morrígan's timeline ===
At one point in the comics an unrevealed god goes into the past and slaughters the majority of the world's Amazons, including Artemis. In this new timeline the trinity goddess The Morrígan revives Artemis from death, claiming her to be one of the Hysminai. The waters of the Underworld provided the following: Acheron cleansed the pain of death, Cocytus aided lamentation, Phlegethon burned away all love, Lethe wiped all memories, and Styx filled her spirit with hate. She is then said to be an avatar to the dark goddess Alecto, and is sent by the goddesses to find the remaining Amazons and their princess to seek revenge for leaving her body on the battlefield. After several skirmishes, Diana is eventually able to remove the war goddesses' influence on Artemis by using the Lasso of Truth. Once this happens, Artemis resumes her place as one of Diana's Amazon subjects. She ultimately dies against her former goddesses defending Diana.

=== Flashpoint ===
In an alternate timeline referred to as Flashpoint, Artemis is the personal bodyguard for Hippolyta's sister Penthesileia. Penthesileia is upset by the upcoming wedding between Wonder Woman and Aquaman. She conspires with Aquaman's brother Ocean Master to stop it from happening. Penthesileia orders Artemis to disguise herself in Garth's armor to murder Wonder Woman on the wedding day. Hippolyta however stops the assassination from happening by blocking the attack. This ultimately kills Hippolyta in the process. Artemis is caught by Garth wearing his armor. She quickly defeats him and uses his unconscious body to frame him for the murder. Aquaman and the Atlanteans then visit Themyscira to negotiate for peace, while Artemis has bombs dropped on Themyscira. Later, Artemis joins the Amazons in conquering the United Kingdom, renaming it New Themyscira. During this same period, Artemis attempts to kill the resistance movement member Lois Lane. She is rescued by Resistance member Britannia using smoke grenades to escape, but Britannia is seriously wounded by Artemis. Later, when Artemis and the Furies battle the Resistance, Artemis follows Lois and Britannia in Westminster's lair. She hits Britannia in the back with an arrow. When Lois prevents her attack, Artemis grabs her and attempts to kill her, but Britannia is able to reach her armour and kills Artemis by flying through her body, tearing it in half and saving Lois.

== In other media ==
=== Television ===
Artemis appears in the Independent Lens episode "Wonder Women! The Untold Story of American Superheroines".

=== Films ===
- Artemis appears in Wonder Woman (2009), voiced by Rosario Dawson. This version is a Themyscirian Amazon who fought beside Hippolyta in ancient Greece.
- Artemis appears in Superman/Batman: Apocalypse, voiced by an uncredited Rachel Quaintance. This version is a friend and sparring partner of Supergirl.
- Artemis makes a non-speaking cameo appearance in Justice League: The Flashpoint Paradox.
- An Amazon named Artemis appears in Wonder Woman (2017), portrayed by Ann Wolfe. This version has little in common with the character of the comics besides name.

=== Video games ===
- Artemis makes a cameo appearance as a non-playable character in Mortal Kombat vs. DC Universe.
- Artemis appears as a playable character in DC Unchained.

=== Miscellaneous ===
Mentions in written work:

- Wonder Woman: Gods and Goddesses by John Byrne (September 1998) Prima Lifestyles
- How to Draw Wonder Woman by John Delaney (September 1998) Walter Foster Publishing
- Wonder Woman: The Life and Times of the Amazon Princess by Les Daniels (2001) Chronicle Books. Later re-issued as Wonder Woman: The Complete History in April 2004.
- Wonder Woman: The Ultimate Guide to the Amazon Princess by Scott Beatty (November 2003) DK Publishing
- The Ultimate Wonder Woman Sticker Book by Alastair Dougall (November 2003) DK Publishing
- Wonder Woman by S. D. Perry and Britta Dennison (January 2009) Pocket Star Publishing
- Unbound: A Devotional Anthology for Artemis by Bibliotheca Alexandrina (May 2009) CreateSpace
- Wonder Woman: Amazon. Hero. Icon. by Bob Greenberger, foreword by George Pérez (April 2010) Universe Books
- The Essential Wonder Woman Encyclopedia by Phil Jimenez and John Wells (April 2010) Del Rey Books
- Artemis is featured in the Smallville Season 11 digital comic based on the TV series.

=== Graphic novels ===
Artemis' stories are collected in several graphic novels:

- Trinity: Batman/Superman/Wonder Woman #1–3 by Matt Wagner
- The Contest: Wonder Woman (vol. 2) #90–93 & #0
- The Challenge of Artemis: Wonder Woman (vol. 2) #94–100
- Requiem: Artemis: Requiem #1–6
- Paradise Lost: Wonder Woman (vol. 2) #164–170 & Wonder Woman Secret Files #2
- Paradise Found: Wonder Woman (vol. 2) #171–177 & Wonder Woman Secret Files #3
- Down to Earth: Wonder Woman (vol. 2) #195–200
- Bitter Rivals: Wonder Woman (vol. 2) #201–205
- Eyes of the Gorgon: Wonder Woman (vol. 2) #206–213
- Land of the Dead: Wonder Woman (vol. 2) #214–217 and The Flash (vol. 2) #219
- Secret Six: Depth: "Secret Six" #8–14

== Merchandise ==
=== Slot machine ===
- Artemis appears in the CryptoLogic produced slot machine game Wonder Woman. The game debuted in December 2009 at InterCasino.com.

=== Toys ===
- In 1999 Warner Bros. released the "Heroes of the DC Universe" 1,000 piece jigsaw puzzle designed exclusively for their Warner Bros. Studio Stores. The puzzle depicts a large array of DC Comics characters, including Artemis dressed in her green and white Requiem costume. Original retail price was $12.
- In March 2001 DC Direct released an action figure of Artemis as part of their "Amazons and Adversaries" line. She is depicted in a green and black uniform given to her during writer Eric Luke's time on the Wonder Woman comic book. The figure stands 6.25" tall and includes the accessories: a bow, quiver, and a sword.
- In 2007 an Artemis figure was produced for the HeroClix line of toys. She is depicted in the Wonder Woman uniform while in mid-flight shooting her bow and arrow. The toy includes a collectible stats card, which tells a little more about Artemis' background and her power and ability levels.
- In October 2008 Mattel released an Artemis variant action figure as part of their DC Universe Classics line of toys. She is shown wearing her Wonder Woman costume complete with bow and arrows.
- In November 2010 a limited edition PVC Artemis statue was released by DC Direct as part of their "Ame-Comi" line. The figure is a repaint of a previous Wonder Woman statue designed by Dustin Nguyen and sculpted by Jack Mathews. The statue stands 9.5 inches tall and is depicted wearing a modified version of the Wonder Woman costume but with green and silver coloring. She also comes with a sword, shield and stand. Original retail price was $60.
- In 2010 the Tonner Doll Company, Inc. released a 13 inch tall limited edition vinyl Artemis doll at the New York Comic Con. The doll's run was limited to 200 pieces, with the remaining unsold dolls made available at the Tonner website. The doll was offered at $139.99 at the New York Comic Con and offered at $149.99 via the website.

=== Comic book inspiration ===
Artemis' name is an intentional reference to the syncretic identification of the Greek Artemis with the Roman Diana. Editor Paul Kupperberg characterized the two Wonder Women, Artemis and Diana, as "two sides of the same coin". This is not the first time that that naming device was used in Wonder Woman comics:

- Artemis, the ancient Wonder Woman seen in Wonder Woman (vol. 1) #298–302 (Dan Mishkin, writer) (Gene Colan, artist), was a predecessor and typology of Diana, set in ancient times. Artemis' remains were reanimated by Circe who sent her on a path to kill the daughter of Hippolyta. In the battle Diana noted that the skeletal Artemis was as strong or stronger than she was and wearing all the symbols of an ancient Amazon warrior.

Artemis' appearance was influenced by two other comic book characters:

- Wildcats member Zealot, a Kherubim and a Coda warrior. Zealot is the immortal former Majestrix of the all female warriors called The Coda and helped develop their virtues and practices. After failing to follow her own rules under the Coda, she left their clan and they have hunted her since. Artemis's long hair flowing from a topknot evokes Zealot's appearance. Artist Mike Deodato has admitted to basing Artemis' appearance on that of Zealot.
- The Amazon Orana from Wonder Woman (vol. 1) #250–251 (December 1978 – January 1979). In this story, the Amazon Orana challenged Diana to a tournament to claim the title of Wonder Woman. She was successful, but her arrogance brought about her death shortly into her reign. Like Artemis, Orana was a fiery redheaded Amazon who died as Wonder Woman.
