= Jason Todd =

DC Comics antihero

- Jason Todd as Red Hood in Teen Titans #1 (September 2026). Art by Dan Mora.

Publication information
- Publisher: DC Comics
- First appearance: As Jason Todd: Batman #357 (March 1983); As Robin: Batman #368 (February 1984); As Red Hood: Batman #635 (February 2005); As Wingman: Batman Incorporated (vol. 2) #1 (July 2012)
- Created by: Gerry Conway (writer); Don Newton (artist)

In-story information
- Full name: Jason Peter Todd
- Species: Human
- Team affiliations: Batman Inc.; Teen Titans; League of Assassins; The Outlaws
- Partnerships: Batman; Redwing (Damian Wayne); Arsenal
- Notable aliases: Robin; Red Hood; Red Robin; Batman; Wingman; Arkham Knight
- Abilities: Peak human condition; Mastery in stealth; Skilled tactician and detective; Expert hand-to-hand combatant, martial artist, and marksman; Proficient in utilizing high-tech weapons, equipment, and gadgetry

Jason Peter Todd is a character appearing in American comic books published by DC Comics. Created by writer Gerry Conway and artist Don Newton to succeed Dick Grayson as Robin, Batman's partner and sidekick, the character first appeared in Batman #357 (1983). Jason initially had a similar origin story to Dick, being an orphan adopted by Bruce Wayne—Batman's alter ego— after his circus acrobat parents were killed by criminals in Gotham City (Dick's parents were killed by a local mob boss while Jason's were murdered by Killer Croc). Following the Crisis on Infinite Earths crossover event and subsequent reboot of the DC Universe, Jason's origin was changed and he was reinterpreted as a street urchin and petty thief whom Batman adopted after catching him attempting to steal the Batmobile's tires; this origin has since become the standard for subsequent iterations of the character.

Following Max Allan Collins's revamping of Jason's origin story in Batman #408–411, the character was written by Jim Starlin, who had him become increasingly aggressive and reckless. This led DC Comics to conduct a telephone poll concerning the 1988 storyline "A Death in the Family" to determine whether the character should die at the hands of Batman's archenemy, the Joker. The poll ended with a narrow majority of votes in favor of killing Jason, resulting in his death. Subsequent stories dealt with Batman's guilt over failing to save him. The character was resurrected in the 2005 "Under the Hood" story arc, which saw him become a murderous supervillain known as the Red Hood. In the current New 52/DC Rebirth continuity, Jason is depicted as an antihero who maintains a tense, albeit partially mended, relationship with Batman and has been accepted as a full member of the Batman family.

Jason has made several appearances as Robin and Red Hood in other forms of media outside of comics, including television series, films, and video games. The 2015 game Batman: Arkham Knight reimagined Jason resurfacing with a new villain identity, the Arkham Knight, after being trapped in Arkham Asylum for years and tortured by the Joker, who conditioned him to despise and turn on his former mentor before assuming the Red Hood identity near the end of the game.

== Publication history ==
By the time Len Wein took over as editor of DC Comics' Batman titles in 1982, Dick Grayson had largely moved on to starring as the leader of the young superhero team the Teen Titans in DC's New Teen Titans title. However, with the character no longer featured in Batman comics, the disadvantages of telling Batman stories without the character to act as a sounding board for the protagonist became apparent. Jason Todd was created to become Dick Grayson's replacement as Robin. The character debuted in Batman #357 (March 1983) and made his first full appearance in Detective Comics #525 (April 1983), but it was not until later that year that he would appear in costume as Robin in Batman #366 (December 1983) when he showed up towards the end of the story to help Batman fight the Joker.

Following the 1985 limited series Crisis on Infinite Earths, DC took the opportunity to reboot many of its properties. The character was completely revamped. According to Dennis O'Neil, who took over as Batman editor in 1986, "[The fans] did hate him. I don't know if it was fan craziness—maybe they saw him as taking over Dick Grayson's position. Some of the mail responses indicated that this was at least on some people's minds."

=== "A Death in the Family" ===
In 1988, Dennis O'Neil suggested that an audience might be attracted to the comics by being offered the opportunity to influence the creative process. Settling on the idea of the telephone poll via a 1-900 number, O'Neil had decided due to discussions with DC Comics president Jenette Kahn that the poll should not be wasted on something insignificant. O'Neil settled on using the poll to determine the fate of the second Robin. O'Neil said, "The logical candidate was Jason because we had reason to believe that he wasn't that popular anyway. It was a big enough stunt that we couldn't do it with a minor character." Even though Jason Todd was unpopular with readers, O'Neil could not decide what to do with the character, so he opted to present the choice to the readership.

The vote was set up in the four-part story "A Death in the Family" that was published in Batman #426–429 in 1988. At the end of Batman #427, Jason was beaten by the Joker and left to die in an explosion. The inside back cover of the issue listed two 1–900 numbers that readers could call to vote for the character's death or survival. Within the 36 hours allotted for voting, the poll received 10,614 votes. The verdict in favor of the character's death won by a slim 72-vote margin of 5,343 votes to 5,271. The following issue, Batman #428, was published featuring Todd's death. Years later, O'Neil said hundreds of votes in the "Jason Dies" line might have come from a single person, adding a large degree of uncertainty to the honesty of results regarding a poll designed to determine the character's popularity. "I heard it was one guy, who programmed his computer to dial the thumbs down number every ninety seconds for eight hours, who made the difference", O'Neil said in a Newsarama interview conducted alongside writer Judd Winick during the "Under The Hood" arc.

O'Neil would later repeat the claim with further specifics: "I heard it was a lawyer who was using a Macintosh and lived in California—I obviously don't have hard information on this, but I heard someone out there programmed his computer to dial it every couple of minutes, and since there was only about 65 votes that made the difference if that story is true, that guy, that guy killed Jason Todd!"

Despite the poll results, O'Neil noted, "We did the deed, and we got a blast of hate mail and a blast of negative commentary in the press." A few comics creators voiced their displeasure at the event. Writer/artist Frank Miller, who had worked on Batman: The Dark Knight Returns and Batman: Year One, said, "To me, the whole killing of Robin thing was probably the ugliest thing I've seen in comics, and the most cynical." However, DC stood behind the outcome of the poll. O'Neil was quoted on the back cover of A Death in the Family trade paperback collecting the story with Todd's death as saying, "It would be a really sleazy stunt to bring him back." O'Neil would later regret his comment.

There was a degree of discontinuity between the Batman and Detective Comics titles with regards to the portrayal of Jason. A lot of adventures occurred post-Crisis which fit with the circus acrobat era and in some cases ran simultaneously in Detective Comics as the street kid origin was being laid out in Batman. This led to a blackout of almost any Robin appearances in Detective Comics. This became especially apparent after his death. Eleven months passed between Jason's death in Batman #428 and the first mention of his passing in Detective Comics #606.

In 1989, Denny O'Neil, Marv Wolfman, and Pat Broderick would introduce Tim Drake as the third Robin. Mindful of the poor reception Jason received from readers, O'Neil arranged for a more nuanced introduction in which Tim first introduced himself to Dick Grayson and impressed the former Robin with his skills, and was revealed to share a history with Grayson. Batman himself would slowly grow to accept Tim as his new partner, although the memory of Jason would play a heavy part in how Batman trained Tim in the months building up to his official appearance as Robin.

=== "Hush" and reintroduction ===
Before the release of Batman #617 (September 2003), a page of art from the issue by artist Jim Lee circulated on the Internet, apparently revealing the mystery villain Hush, who was the focus of Lee and writer Jeph Loeb's "Hush" storyline, as a resurrected Jason. The following month's Batman #618 (October 2003) revealed that the appearance of Todd was a ruse by the villain Clayface under the direction of the Riddler and Hush. Loeb explained, "I always liked Jason, liked the idea that Batman had a Robin who died in the line of duty and how that would motivate anyone to continue their quest. It would also be the most recent, most painful thing he had to endure. That's why Hush played the card—to get inside Batman's head... But 'Hush' wasn't about Jason—Jason was a pawn to be moved around the table... If someone else wanted to tell another Jason story or bring him back and we at least opened the door, that's great!"

In 2005, writer Judd Winick began the Under the Hood storyline that revolved around the mystery of the identity of the new Red Hood. The character's identity was revealed as Jason Todd in Batman #638. Winick explained that after his initial arc on the Batman title, he suggested doing "something big" to his editors. Specifically, he wanted to bring the character back from the dead. Winick said, "I was less interested in the how and the why and the what of Jason Todd returning from the dead than I am about what Jason's return will do to Batman. Now."

The explanation for the character's return was revealed in Batman Annual #25 (2006). After a storyline in Nightwing as part of the One Year Later event where Todd took the mantle of Nightwing for himself, the character reappeared in his Red Hood persona as one of the focal characters of DC's year-long weekly Countdown series starting in May 2007.

=== "Battle for the Cowl" ===
In the Batman R.I.P. follow-up storyline Batman: Battle for the Cowl (2009), Jason Todd is featured as a gun-wielding vigilante. Commenting on the direction and utilization of Jason Todd in the storyline, writer and artist Tony Daniel has stated that, from this point on, Jason is a "bona fide" villain:

At this point [Jason] is beyond the point of no return in terms of ever being considered even remotely a hero. What I wanted to do here is put him in a place that he can't come back from. The things that he does here in Battle for the Cowl are things that can never really be forgiven. The only outcome would have to be imprisonment or something worse. But from this point on for Jason, the gray area between good and bad has disappeared. It's crystal clear now that he is on the dark side.

Timothy Drake eventually takes up the bat mantle when Dick Grayson refuses to and sets off to fight Jason, who easily defeats him. Dick then comes to the rescue and refuses to believe Jason when he claims he has killed Tim (which he had not since current Robin Damian Wayne rescued Tim at the last moment). The two battle and Dick eventually defeats Jason, who says that he will be seen again.

=== The Outlaws ===
On June 6, 2011, as part of DC Comics' line-wide revamp initiative, it was announced that Jason Todd would headline his title in the guise of the Red Hood. Todd acts as leader of the Outlaws, a group of antiheroes that "have several different exciting characters from the DC Universe – some we've seen before and some we haven't," Batman Group Editor Mike Marts said. The group included Roy Harper and Starfire. Red Hood and the Outlaws debuted in September 2011, written by Scott Lobdell and with art by Kenneth Rocafort. The series focused on Jason Todd's redemption and introduced a simplified version of his origin story as the Red Hood in Red Hood and the Outlaws #0, a special prequel issue between #12 and #13.

Red Hood and the Outlaws was later rebooted as part of DC's Rebirth event. This series starred a new lineup of Outlaws: Todd, Artemis of Bana-Mighdall and Bizarro, who was touted as a darker counterpart to the Trinity. This lineup lasted for 25 issues, after which Todd briefly reunited with Roy Harper and then went solo. Todd later rescues Bunker and joins forces with a new Wingman to take over Penguin's Iceberg Lounge.

=== 2025 Red Hood series ===
In June 2025, DC announced that it would release a mature Red Hood series written by Gretchen Felker-Martin, featuring Jason Todd. In September, DC canceled the Red Hood series one day after its debut, following comments made by Felker-Martin on Bluesky regarding the assassination of Charlie Kirk that were deemed "inconsistent with DC's standards of conduct".

== Fictional character biography ==
=== Pre-Crisis on Infinite Earths ===
Jason Todd as Robin, before Crisis on Infinite Earths crossover events, as he appeared in Batman #368 (February 1984) in a replica of Dick Grayson's costume. Art by Don Newton (pencil), Alfredo Alcala (ink), and Dick Giordano and Ed Hannigan (color).

The initial version of Jason Todd from before Crisis on Infinite Earths had an origin similar to the 1940 origin of the original Robin (Dick Grayson). Originally, he is the son of circus acrobats (Joseph and Trina Todd, who were killed by Killer Croc) and is later adopted by Bruce Wayne. Distinguished by his Blonde hair, Todd uses parts of Dick Grayson's old childhood disguises as a costume to fight crime until Grayson presents him with a Robin costume of his own. At that point, Todd dyes his hair black, and in later stories blossoms under Batman's tutelage.

For a time Natalia Knight, the criminal Nocturna, briefly becomes Todd's surrogate mother and adopts him in an attempt to win the Wayne fortune, although she ends up falling for Batman. Catwoman would be a frequent guest star during this era as she wrestled with the role of hero and as a love interest for Batman, which led to Todd feeling left out. After Nocturna's death, Catwoman took over both as love interest and forged a more positive relationship with Todd.

In the Alan Moore epic Superman Annual #11, For the Man Who Has Everything, Batman and Todd join Wonder Woman at the Fortress of Solitude to celebrate Superman's birthday. They arrive to find Superman incapacitated by a mysterious creature called the Black Mercy and Mongul there to battle the heroes. Todd saves Wonder Woman, Superman, and Batman from Mongul by turning the Black Mercy on him.

=== Post-Crisis on Infinite Earths ===
==== Origin ====
Following the revamp due to Crisis on Infinite Earths, Jason Todd is recast as a young street orphan who first encounters Batman while attempting to steal the tires off the Batmobile in Crime Alley, where Batman's parents were murdered years before. The son of Catherine and Willis Todd, Jason lives on the east end of Gotham City in the Park Row district called Crime Alley. Catherine was a drug addict who died of an overdose some time before Jason began living on the streets. Willis, a former medical student, worked as hired muscle for Two-Face and disappeared suspiciously following a botched assignment. Bruce Wayne sees to it that Todd is placed in a school for troubled youths, which turns out to be Ma Gunn's School for Crime. Todd earns the Robin mantle a short while later by helping Batman apprehend a gang of thieves. However, Todd does not wear the Robin costume until completing six months of training. Batman notes that while Todd does not possess Dick Grayson's natural athleticism and acrobatic skills, he can become a productive crimefighter by channeling his rage. He also believes that if he does not help the boy, Todd will eventually become part of the "criminal element".

In the revamp period, Todd is portrayed as the "rebel" Robin, reflecting the late 1980s youth culture. He smokes, swears, and fights authority. He is prone to defying Batman's orders, sometimes to success (bringing in the Scarecrow singlehandedly) and sometimes to failure (botching a raid on a drug lab by jumping the gun too soon). Todd also aided Batman while Gotham City was temporarily overrun by Deacon Blackfire in Batman: The Cult.

The most controversial moment before Todd's death occurred in Batman #424 when serial rapist Felipe Garzonas escapes prosecution due to his father's diplomatic immunity. One of his victims, a girl named Gloria, hangs herself amid the threat of being raped again. Todd discovers her hanging and makes a beeline for Felipe, ahead of Batman, who arrived just in time to see Felipe take a 22-story fall to his death, with Todd as Robin at the edge of the balcony. It is left ambiguous whether Todd killed him.

In Batman #425, Batman and Robin are challenged by Felipe's father, who kidnaps Commissioner Gordon in retaliation for his son's death. Batman is instructed to meet the kidnappers at a city junkyard and to bring Robin. Batman does not wish to involve Todd and keeps this information from him. However, Robin senses something is wrong and hides in the Batmobile's trunk as Batman heads to the junkyard. There, Batman is unable to reach Gordon, surrounded by Garzonas' men, and Todd intervenes, saving Batman. Machine gun fire breaks out and Gordon is wounded in the arm. All of the henchmen die, and Garzonas is crushed by a pile of junk cars.

==== Death ====
In 1988's "A Death in the Family" storyline, Jason Todd discovers that Catherine Todd was not his biological mother, and runs away to find the woman who gave birth to him. Todd tracks his biological mother Sheila Haywood to Ethiopia, where she works as an aid worker. While Todd is overjoyed to be reunited with his real mother, he soon discovers that she is being blackmailed by the Joker using her to provide him with medical supplies. Sheila herself has been embezzling from the aid agency and as part of the cover-up, she hands Todd to the Joker. Joker beats Todd with a crowbar and then leaves him and Sheila in the warehouse with a time bomb, killing them. Batman is unable to save Todd, considering his death his greatest failure. He keeps Todd's Robin uniform on display in the Batcave as a reminder.

==== Return from the grave ====
Years later, while trying to discover the identity of a mysterious figure plotting against him, Batman discovers that Tim Drake, Todd's successor as Robin, has been kidnapped. He confronts the kidnapper and is stunned to discover that he is Todd. Batman subdues Todd and learns that he is really Clayface impersonating him. However, Todd's actual body is missing from his grave.

When Superboy-Prime altered reality, Todd was restored to life. He breaks out of his coffin and is eventually hospitalized; because he wandered so far from his grave before his discovery, no connection was ever drawn between the two events. Todd never turns up on any missing person reports—as he was never 'missing'—nor can he be identified since no prints are on file for him. After spending a year in a coma and subsequently another year as an amnesiac vagrant, he is taken by Talia al Ghul after a small-time crook recognizes him.

Talia takes Todd in out of her love for Batman, while her father Ra's al Ghul is interested in the secret behind his resurrection. The League of Assassins track down and eliminate everyone in Gotham who knows of Todd's resurrection to prevent Batman from finding out. They also interrogate Joker's henchmen who were with him during Todd's murder in hopes to find out how he could have survived. Talia later restores Todd's health and memory by immersing him in a Lazarus Pit.

After engaging in a sexual liaison with Talia, she manipulates Todd by convincing him to take revenge on Batman. Using the money from Talia and infuriated by her statement that he "remains unavenged", Todd pays a group of mercenaries to help him return to Gotham. Upon arriving, he enacts a plan to get revenge on Batman, whom he resents for refusing to kill the Joker and avenge his death.

==== The Lost Days ====
Jason Todd creates a false arms trafficking of advanced military arsenal, knowing that Batman would respond. This provides Todd an opportunity to plant a bomb beneath the Batmobile while Batman is on a stakeout for the arms deal. Batman enters the car and is at Todd's mercy, detonator in hand. However, Todd realizes that if he went through with it, his former mentor would never know about his return nor the identity of his killer. Todd instead decides to kill Batman directly by traveling across the globe in search of a similar, but deadlier type of training to Bruce Wayne's own to prepare for that day. For years, Todd learns various skills from various masters, assassins, mercenaries, and aviators around the globe, including guns, poisons and antitoxins, martial arts, acrobatics, and bomb-making. Upon learning that the man training him in lethal combat is also the leader of a child sex slave ring, Todd frees the latest shipment of children and takes them to a local embassy, then returns to the training compound and poisons his new mentor for his crimes. Upon being questioned by Talia al Ghul, Todd says it was not murder but rather that he "put down a reptile". Todd repeated the same pattern of killing his teachers when finding them guilty after he has finished with his training.

During his journey, Todd discovers that his replacement as Robin was Tim Drake, which further torments him. He also learns that the man teaching him bomb-making is involved in a Russian mafia-backed deal meant to push the resources of British law-enforcement away from mob crime and onto Islamic extremist terrorism with a framed bombing plot. Todd manages to hunt down the gang and safely detonate the bombs. Ironically, the only surviving member of the gang offers Todd the possibility of a large government payday in exchange for his life, because he knows where a very wanted man is. That wanted man turns out to be the Joker.

After learning of the Joker's arms deal in Los Angeles for another terrorism scheme against Gotham, Todd begins to stalk the villain as a masked gunman. After successfully capturing Joker (who fails to recognize him due to being older), Todd contemplates burning his killer alive after dousing him with gasoline. However, Todd realizes that he does not simply want Joker to die, but desires to punish the villain with Batman. Todd spares Joker and decides to wait for the right opportunity. Todd also admits to Talia that he has already deduced that the reason she finances his training is to stall him from killing Batman, but he has no desire to kill his former mentor anymore. Talia then gives Todd the idea to be the Batman that Gotham needs. She also hires the same carpenters who built Todd's casket and had them build a replica of it. Todd enters into a pact with Hush and the Riddler. He confirms to Hush that Riddler is correct and that Bruce Wayne is Batman. Todd initially confronts Batman at his gravesite, then switches places with Clayface to observe Batman from afar. When Batman expresses no remorse for sparing Joker's life after the second Robin was killed, Todd is further angered and takes up his murderer's original mantle. After she initiated a takeover of Kord Industries for him, Talia gifts Todd the flame dagger (a replica of the one Ra's al Ghul often carried) and the red motorcycle-helmet based hood which become his signature weapon and mask.

==== Red Hood ====
The Red Hood, as he appeared prior to his unmasking in Batman Villains Secret Files and Origins 2005 #1 (July 2005). Art by Eduardo Barreto (pencils), Jay Leisten (inks), and Lee Loughridge (colors).

Shortly after the events of War Games and just before War Crimes, Jason reappears in Gotham City as the Red Hood. During the events of Batman: Under the Hood, he hijacks a shipment of kryptonite from Black Mask, and in the midst of a battle with Batman, Nightwing and Mr. Freeze, Red Hood gives them the kryptonite back, and tells them he has gotten what he truly wanted: a "lay of the land". Shortly afterward, Red Hood finds the Joker and beats him with a crowbar, just as Joker had beaten him. Despite the violence of the beating, Red Hood spares Joker, intending to use him later against Batman.

Jason Todd, revealed himself being alive and as the Red Hood to the shocked Joker, after he pummeled him with a crowbar, in Batman #638. Art by Doug Mahnke.

Red Hood assumes control over several gangs in Gotham City and starts a one-man war against Black Mask, who himself had recently allegedly murdered Stephanie Brown. Overall, he strives to take over Gotham's gangs, control their activities, and kill Joker in revenge for his death. In his new role as Gotham's most powerful crime lord, he repeatedly comes to blows with Batman and several of his allies. After several confrontations, Batman becomes obsessed with the possibility of resurrection from the dead, suspecting that it was Jason Todd he fought, and seeks advice from allies such as Superman and Green Arrow, both of whom have died and returned to life. Around this time, Batman discovers that the empty coffin buried at Todd's gravesite is a replica of what he bought. After a series of tests confirmed that it is Todd, Batman continues to keep his Robin costume in its memorial display case in the Batcave regardless; when Alfred Pennyworth asks if he wants the costume removed, Batman sadly replies that the return of Todd "doesn't change anything at all" because he wants to remember Todd as the good kid he was when they first met and blames himself over how violent he has become by letting him assume the Robin mantle.

Todd breaks into Titans Tower to confront the third Robin, thus revealing the truth of their encounter at the cemetery to his successor. Having learned that Drake defeated the Joker by himself in their first fights, Todd seeks to best him in combat. Wearing another version of his Robin costume, Todd quickly immobilizes the other Teen Titans and defeats Drake in the Tower's Hall of Fallen Titans, demonstrating that he is now a more formidable fighter than he was before his death. Furious that no memorial statue was made for him (despite his short tenure as a Titan), he demands that Drake tell him if he is as good as Todd has been told. Drake says "Yes" and passes out. As he leaves, he tears the 'R' emblem from Drake's chest, though he later grudgingly acknowledges that Drake is a worthy successor for his courage. Todd is also left wondering if perhaps he would have been a better Robin and better person had he had a life like Drake's and friends like the Titans.

Todd eventually kidnaps and holds Joker hostage, luring Batman to Crime Alley, the site of their first meeting. Despite their now-antagonistic relationship, Batman desperately wants to help Todd and intends to atone for his failures. Todd asks Batman why he has not avenged his death by killing Joker, a psychopath who has murdered countless people and crippled one of their best friends, arguing that Batman should have done it "because he took me away from you". Batman admits that he has often been tempted by the thought of taking the Joker somewhere private to torture for weeks before finally killing the maniac, but says that he refuses to go to that place. Todd then offers Batman an ultimatum: he will kill Joker unless Batman kills Todd first. Holding Joker at gunpoint, he throws a pistol at Batman and begins to count to three while standing behind Joker, leaving Batman with only a headshot if he wants to stop Todd from pulling the trigger. At the last moment, Batman throws a batarang at Todd, which bounces off a pipe and sinks into his neck causing him to drop his gun. Joker takes advantage of the situation, detonating nearby explosives that engulf the platform and send them plunging into the bay.

==== Nightwing ====
Jason Todd resurfaces following the "One Year Later" period, patrolling the streets of New York City as a murderous version of Nightwing. However, Jason shows no intention of giving up the Nightwing persona when confronted by Dick Grayson and continues to taunt his predecessor by wearing the costume and suggesting that the two become a crime-fighting team. Not long after the two Nightwings meet up, Jason is captured and imprisoned by local mobsters Barry and Buddy Pierce. Grayson reluctantly rescues him, and the two join forces to defeat the Pierce brothers. Shortly afterward, Jason leaves New York City and the Nightwing mantle to Grayson, along with a telegram telling Grayson he has returned to normal and still considers himself a gift from Batman.

==== Red Hood again ====
Jason Todd resumes his persona as the Red Hood and appears in several issues of Green Arrow alongside Brick as part of a gun-running organization, which brings Batman to Star City. Todd's true motives are shown in the third part as he kidnaps Mia Dearden to dissolve her partnership with Green Arrow, feeling that they are kindred spirits, cast down by society and at odds with their mentors. The two fight while Todd discusses the insanity of heroes for placing child sidekicks in danger. Mia is deeply troubled by the discussion but ultimately decides to remain with Green Arrow.

At the start of Countdown, Todd rescues a woman from Duela Dent. After a Monitor shoots and kills Duela, he attempts to kill Todd, but is stopped by a second Monitor. This second Monitor apologizes to Todd before they both disappear, leaving Todd alone with Duela's body. At Duela's funeral, Todd hides until all of the Teen Titans have left except Donna Troy. Todd tells her what happened the night of Duela's death, and about the dueling Monitors. He knows that both he and Troy have come back from the dead, even already deducing that his resurrection has something to do with Alexander Luthor Jr.'s plans during Infinite Crisis, and wonders which of them is next on the Monitor's hit list. The two are then attacked by the Forerunner, but before she can kill them, the apologetic Monitor stops her and recruits Todd and Troy to find Ray Palmer.

==== Red Robin ====
Jason Todd taking the role of Red Robin. Art by Phil Jimenez

A teaser image released to promote Countdown showed a figure resembling Red Robin among assembled heroes in poses symbolic of their roles in the series. After a series of contradictory statements about this figure, executive editor Dan DiDio firmly stated in the July 2007 DC Nation column that the figure is Jason Todd. The Red Robin costume, originally designed by Alex Ross for the 1996 Kingdom Come limited series and worn by the Earth-22 Dick Grayson, is seen in Countdown to Final Crisis #16 in the Earth-51 Batman's base of operations; it is revealed that Earth-51 became the peaceful world it is because the Batman of this Earth killed all the supervillains after his version of Todd was killed by the Joker. In issue #14, Todd dons the Red Robin suit and goes into battle alongside Earth-51 Batman. During a battle with a group of Monarch's soldiers, Earth-51 Batman is killed by Ultraman, deeply affecting Todd. In his grief, Todd kills an alternate version of the Joker, also involved in Batman's killing. Todd escape with Troy and Palmer before Earth-51 is destroyed.

After the group is sent back to Earth, Todd leaves the group and returns to his crime-fighting ways. When the Morticoccus virus is released from Karate Kid's body, he is forcibly brought back to the group, to his dismay. When the Challengers return to New Earth, Todd disposes of his Red Robin costume and abandons the rest of the group, though they go on to declare to the Monitors that they are now the monitors of the Monitors. Todd and Drake are confronted by another Red Robin in Robin (vol. 2) #177, whose identity is initially a mystery but later turns out to be Ulysses Armstrong. Due to a combination of Red Robin's involvement and a gun-toting gang member, Todd was shot in the leg and arrested by police. Upon the resolution of the gang war in Gotham, Drake under a pseudonym visited Todd in prison to give him the Justice League access code to release himself from prison. Todd is booked under a pseudonym (John Doe), due to being legally dead. Following his escape, Todd continues on the mend and is summoned by Tim Drake to come to the Batcave, where Batman has left a last will statement for him. After hearing the statement in private, Todd prepares to leave, not revealing what he was told, although he does pause before his old costume and the tattered remains of Batman's.

==== Batman ====
Jason Todd reappears in the "Battle for the Cowl" series. Dressed in a version of a Batman costume, Todd is also living/operating out of an abandoned Gotham subway system. His inner monologue reveals that he had always wanted to eventually replace Batman, and thinks it was a bad idea for Batman to become a public figure, rather than an urban legend.

After stabbing Tim Drake in the chest with a Batarang, he and Dick Grayson battle down in the subway. Nightwing still wants to save Todd, but Todd refuses the offer, and instead allows himself to fall off a speeding train into the Gotham River while stating they would see each other again soon. This allowed Grayson to officially take up the mantle of Batman.

It is later revealed in Battle for the Cowl that Bruce Wayne's last words to Todd were of regret at how he had overlooked the young man's deep emotional problems. He thought he could do what could never be done for him and 'make him whole'. His message goes on to plead that Todd gets psychiatric help, a notion that the latter rejects. It is suggested by Dick Grayson that Todd was infuriated by Wayne's last words, a reaction that led him to become a monstrous, murdering Batman in that same arc. Plus, it aggravated his hatred towards the Bat family, as he repeatedly attempts to kill members of it.

==== Red Hood and Scarlet ====
In the second story arc of Batman and Robin by Grant Morrison and Philip Tan, Jason Todd retakes the Red Hood mantle after losing his bid to become the new Batman. To make the concept of Batman obsolete, he puts a lot of effort into public relations: he drastically alters his Red Hood costume to look more like a traditional superhero outfit and recruits his sidekick Scarlet. In their war on crime, Red Hood and Scarlet freely kill criminals, villains, and anyone who gets in their way, even the police. He leaves behind a calling card that states "let the punishment fit the crime". He describes his vendetta against Grayson as "the revenge of one crazy man in a mask on another crazy man in a mask".

Todd has reappeared with red hair, claiming that he is a natural red-head and that Bruce Wayne had him dye his hair black to look like Dick Grayson. In the issue, Todd is characterized as increasingly unstable and his idea of "finishing off" Batman and Robin now consists of stripping them down to their underwear and exposing their identities via webcam activated by a phone poll, a nod to the death poll that killed Todd. A fight between Batman, Robin, and the Flamingo – a foreign hitman hired by a Mexican cartel after Red Hood killed their operative in Gotham – ends with Todd burying Flamingo in debris with a bulldozer. Flamingo is assumed dead, although Commissioner Gordon reports that his body cannot be recovered from beneath the rubble.

Grayson offers to rehabilitate Todd who, in a moment of clarity, tells Grayson it is too late for him, and how he tried to be what Batman wanted, "but this world... this dirty, twisted, cruel and ugly dungheap had... other plans for me". He then proceeds to fall back into his hero persona, ranting how he did what Batman never did. He "defeated his archenemy". Todd is arrested by Gordon who informs him that the reason he has always worked with Batman is that Batman never violates the law "where it counts". As Gordon leads him away, Todd tauntingly asks Grayson why he has not put Wayne's corpse into a Lazarus Pit to bring him back, citing his resurrection from its bath. Scarlet flees Gotham, her mask falling from her face as she leaves.

Todd files an appeal to be moved from Arkham Asylum where he has been held for observation for the last several months. Bruce Wayne as Batman visits him there to inform Todd that he is in Arkham for his protection. Todd points out he has passed all the psychological tests repeatedly and there is no reason to keep him in what he calls Batman's "kennel of freaks". It is also revealed that, like Tim, Todd is aware that Batman survived his encounter with Darkseid. Todd is transferred to a Gotham prison and upon his arrival, the suicide rate spikes amongst top incarcerated crime figures there. Several homicides occur due to many botched attempts on Todd's life by inmates with a grudge against Red Hood's tactics. Todd escalates things further by poisoning the cafeteria, killing 82 and sickening 100 more inmates. He is immediately transferred back to Arkham but is broken out of the paddy wagon by a group of mercenaries. The mercs reveal they are under orders to bring Todd to the person that hired them and that he is in no danger. Todd breaks free and fights them off all the same as Batman and Robin arrive. Once the hired guns are subdued they reveal their employer has captured Scarlet. Dick, Damian, and Todd go to one of Todd's weapon caches, where he assembles a composite costume made from his biker and "superhero" Red Hood attire. The three intend to rescue Scarlet. After Batman and Robin defeat the mercs, Red Hood rescues Scarlet and escapes. Batman and Robin attempt to chase him, but Red Hood tells them that he planted bombs over Gotham City months ago. Scarlet desires to stay with Red Hood as his partner. Red Hood and Scarlet head towards an unknown destination.

=== The New 52 ===
==== Origin ====
In September 2011, The New 52 rebooted DC's continuity. In this new timeline, Jason Todd's new origin is revealed in a special Red Hood and the Outlaws #0 (November 2012) issue, which changes how Batman first met Jason (stealing medicine from Leslie Thompkins, after she had treated him from a brutal beating). The backup introduces a retcon in which the Joker is responsible for orchestrating the major moments of Jason's life, such as his father's imprisonment and death, his mother's overdose, his introduction to Thompkins, and his adoption of the Robin identity. Considering the Joker is the one narrating this segment, it is open to debate whether he is telling the truth or not. Though only lightly touched on, his resurrection is also simplified: he is resurrected with a Lazarus Pit by Talia al Ghul rather than Superboy-Prime's influence.

==== The Outlaws ====
Jason Todd as Robin in Red Hood and the Outlaws #0 (November 2012). Art by Brett Booth

Following the events of the "Flashpoint" storyline, the DC universe was relaunched, with Red Hood becoming the leader of the Outlaws in their series, part of the New 52 line of comics. The team also includes Starfire and Roy Harper. Instead of being trained by various men after his return from the dead, Jason Todd was trained by an order of warriors known as the All Caste. He was a part of the order for an unknown amount of time before he was exiled, partly of his own will. After his exile, he became Red Hood and came to be at odds with Dick Grayson, Starfire's ex-lover, and his Robin predecessor. He soon tires of Gotham and leaves, gathering the group together; after breaking out Roy from a Middle Eastern prison, he brings Roy up to speed on things. The two start on very friendly terms. Roy and Starfire are in a sexual relationship. However, Starfire makes it clear to Roy that it is only physical, with no emotional ties. Essence, a fellow exiled member of the All Caste whom Jason knows, appears to him but is invisible to others. She informs Jason that the order of the All Caste, the people most qualified to handle the situation, have been slaughtered, leaving her and Jason as the only survivors.

Jason has also been revealed to be a member of Batman, Incorporated, initially operating under the name of Wingman, an agent-based in Europe. Wingman temporarily allies himself with Damian Wayne, who is using the name "Redbird" at the time. Batman, Inc is at war with an organization named Leviathan, headed by Talia al Ghul, Damian's mother and the woman responsible for reviving Jason, but in the present, she seeks to destroy Batman and has put a bounty on their son's head. Alfred Pennyworth refers to Jason as wanting "to be redeemed" through his membership. Later, however, the Wingman ruse is exposed and Jason returns to being Red Hood. While he recalls his days as Wingman as a failure, Bruce Wayne is nevertheless proud of him. Following the events of Death of the Family, Bruce and Alfred care for a sick Jason in the Manor, culminating in a warm embrace between Jason and his father figure as he regains consciousness, suggesting that their animosity might finally be put to rest. After Jason recovers and in the wake of Damian's death, Batman partners with Jason for the first time since his time as Robin. Batman brings Jason on a mission in Ethiopia to punish some of Damian's other would-be assassins, and while there he also takes him to the place of his death in the hopes Jason can provide insights into his resurrection so that he might apply the method to Damian. Jason is hurt by Batman's manipulation, and the two share harsh words and exchange blows, shattering their newfound relationship. Later, however, the pair come together, united by the ties of family. Jason teams up with Batman, Batgirl, Cyborg and Red Robin to rescue Damian's body from Apokolips. They are successful, and Damian is resurrected, sharing a warm reunion with Jason and the family.

Following the traumas of Death of the Family, Damian's death, and his betrayal by Batman, Jason returns to the All-Caste and has his memories wiped so that he may be at peace. He is 'rescued' by Starfire and Arsenal, but does not regain his memories. He subsequently learns of his history from Starfire's computer, which states Red Hood has made 83 confirmed kills. Jason refuses to believe from Starfire and Arsenal that he had been on a path towards redemption and abandons his teammates.

==== Red Hood/Arsenal ====
Following the conclusion of the first volume of Red Hood and the Outlaws, a new series starring Red Hood teaming up with Arsenal as heroes for hire began entitled Red Hood/Arsenal. The series eventually ended coinciding with the DC Rebirth event.

=== DC Comics Rebirth ===
==== Red Hood and the Outlaws ====
Jason Todd with Artemis and Bizarro on the variant cover of Red Hood and the Outlaws (vol. 2) #22 (July 2018). Art by Guillem March.

The DC Rebirth introduced the revival of Red Hood and the Outlaws with a second volume released in August 2016. Jason Todd's backstory is altered to resemble his post-Crisis meeting with Batman occurring while trying to steal tires from the Batmobile. Jason's mother is already dead by now and his father is serving a life sentence in prison, so he has been living on the streets. Batman at first tries to help him by enrolling him in Ma Gunn's boarding school, trying to give him a home. However, he does not realize that Gunn is using the school as a cover to recruit young delinquents into her criminal gang. When Batman discovers this, he takes down Gunn with help from Jason.

Batman then takes him in and raises him as the new Robin, though realizes early on that Jason has a violent streak. After Jason is killed by the readers and resurrected in the Lazarus Pit, he goes on to become the Red Hood, straining his relationship with Batman. The new team consists of Jason as Red Hood, Artemis, and Bizarro. This team is referred to as DC's "Dark Trinity" in comparison to the new Trinity series included in DC Rebirth, which follows Batman, Superman, and Wonder Woman. The team would stay together until Red Hood and the Outlaws (vol. 2) #25-26, where Jason went solo after his team disappeared and the title was changed to Red Hood: Outlaw. He also later appears in Year of the Villain and Event Leviathan #2.

==== Infinite Frontier ====
Jason Todd led his own Suicide Squad, consisting of Bane, Arkham Knight, Hannah Hobart, Man-Bat, and Mister Bloom until he disbanded them by the series' end. Jason helped Batman deal with villains taking over Gotham during the storylines "City of Bane", "Joker War", and "Fear State". Jason helped console Roy Harper after Beast Boy was severely wounded by Deathstroke during "Dark Crisis" and was affected by Insomnia's spell during "Knight Terrors". He wakes up from Insomnia's spell with help from Tim Drake. Jason initially sides with Catwoman during Gotham War, which leads to a confrontation against Batman. Batman captures Jason and uses an altered version of Scarecrow's toxins to force him to stop being a hero. Jason fights off the mind control, but his relationship with Batman is strained.

== Powers and abilities ==
Like Batman, Jason typically does not possess inherent super-powers, instead relying on his natural abilities and technology. As Robin, Jason was initially considered a first-class athlete and a capable hand-to-hand combatant, although his skills around investigation were considered to be relatively weak. These abilities were honed over time, with Jason becoming adept in martial arts and eventually developing keen detective skills. He also has firearm training comparable to law enforcement agencies' standard ( i.e. FBI) despite not typically using such skills as Robin.

After his resurrection, Jason's character typically received more advanced training from the League of Assassins and All-Caste. This elevated prior abilities, making him a more proficient martial artist and marksman capable with various firearms while employing a more lethal fighting style compared to his first mentor. He possesses considerable "street smarts", and is considered a natural leader. At times, he has been depicted as having magical abilities originating from training with the All-Caste. These abilities chiefly revolve around summoning the All-Blades, weapons manifested from Jason's soul that allow him to fight mystical threats and can be summoned when needed. In addition, his All-Caste training enables him to resist paralytic toxins, fight while blind, and see the past, present, and future all at once.

=== Equipment ===
For a time, through Talia al Ghul's access to Kord Industries, as well as being LexCorp's former CEO, Jason had access to high-level weaponry and advanced computer equipment and gadgetry. However, his dagger remains his preferred weapon of choice for hand-to-hand combat; it can cut through Batman's armor and arsenal. Having been trained in the use of Batman's batarangs in perfect aim, he has some lethally sharpened shurikens similar to his dagger that based on his former mentor's designs as throwing weapons. His weapons of choice are a pair of customized IWI Jericho 941s, fitted with extra Picatinny rails and mini red-dot sights.

== Alternative versions ==
Many alternate universe versions of Jason Todd have appeared throughout the character's publication history. In The Dark Knight Returns, Todd was killed in the line of duty, predating his death in A Death in the Family. In the 2016 one-shot Dark Knight Returns: The Last Crusade, it is retroactively established that Todd was killed by the Joker, as in the main universe. In World Without Young Justice, Todd is the son of criminal acrobats Willis and Catherine Todd and is later killed by his ex-girlfriend (an alternate version of Empress). In the Amalgam Comics universe, Todd is a S.H.I.E.L.D. recruit who was transformed into the cyborg Deathlok after being injured in an explosion. In Flashpoint, Todd is a priest and former follower of Brother Blood. In DC Comics Bombshells, Todd is a Spanish child who aided Kate Kane and Renee Montoya during the Spanish Civil War before being killed by Cheetah. In Batman: White Knight, Todd was the first Robin and survived being captured by the Joker, joining the military and later becoming the Red Hood. The series From the DC Vault: A Death in the Family: Robin Lives! presents an alternate outcome where Todd was not killed by the Joker. In Absolute Batman, Todd is one of the adopted children of Jack Grimm/Joker, and is an antagonist for Batman.

== In other media ==
=== Television ===
Jason Todd / Robin (Curran Walters) as depicted in Titans

- Elements of Jason Todd were incorporated into The New Batman Adventures incarnation of Tim Drake, such as the former's origins as a young street thief and the son of a criminal working under Two-Face. Additionally, the Batman: A Death in the Family storyline was going to be adapted into the series, before the idea was ultimately abandoned after being deemed too dark for a children's series.
- Jason Todd as Robin and the Red Hood appears in Young Justice, voiced by Josh Keaton. After being alluded to in the second season as Robin, a member of the Team who died in the line of duty off-screen and received a memorial hologram, Todd appears in the third season as a ninja under Ra's al Ghul's command.
- Jason Todd makes a cameo appearance in the New Teen Titans episode "Red X Unmasked" as one of Red X's possible identities.
- Jason Todd as Robin and the Red Hood appears in Titans, portrayed by Curran Walters. Introduced in the first season, he takes Dick Grayson's place as Robin and eventually goes on to join the Titans at Batman's request before leaving the team at the end of the second season. In the third season, Todd becomes the Red Hood after being killed by the Joker and resurrected by the Scarecrow via a Lazarus Pit, then brainwashed with a special chemical. Todd initially seeks to ruin the Titans and help the Scarecrow take over Gotham City until he eventually breaks free of the Scarecrow's control and helps the Titans defeat him.
  - This incarnation of Jason Todd also makes a cameo appearance in "Crisis on Infinite Earths" via archival footage from Titans's first season.
- Jason Todd as the Red Hood makes a cameo appearance in the Harley Quinn episode "Gotham's Hottest Hotties" as one of Harley Quinn's contacts. Additionally, an actor playing Todd as Robin makes a cameo appearance in the episode "The 83rd Annual Villy Awards".
- Jason Todd appears in the Batman: Caped Crusader episode "Nocturne", voiced by Henry Witcher. This version is an orphan under Leslie Thompkins' care.

=== Film ===
Jason Todd as Red Hood (left) and Robin (center and right) as depicted in Batman: Under the Red Hood.

- Jason Todd as Robin and the Red Hood appears in Batman: Under the Red Hood, voiced by Alexander Martella as a child, Vincent Martella as a teenager, and Jensen Ackles as an adult. This version's origin story plays out similarly to his comics counterpart post-Crisis on Infinite Earths.
- Jason Todd's death at the Joker's hands is alluded to in Batman v Superman: Dawn of Justice. While Warner Bros. has stated that the dead Robin's suit that appears in the film belongs to Todd, director Zack Snyder added later that he originally intended for it to belong to Dick Grayson before Warner Bros. changed it since they had begun development on a Nightwing film. Bolstering Snyder's statement, a prop for Grayson's grave was created, but is obscured in the film. He elaborated further that had he stayed with the franchise, Robin would "stay dead...till Carrie".
- A picture of Jason Todd / Robin appears in Batman: The Killing Joke.
- A young, Victorian era-inspired, alternate reality version of Jason Todd makes a cameo appearance in Batman: Gotham by Gaslight, voiced by an uncredited Grey Griffin.
- A Feudal Japan-inspired incarnation of Jason Todd / Red Hood appears in Batman Ninja, voiced by Akira Ishida in the Japanese version and Yuri Lowenthal in the English dub.
- Jason Todd as the Red Hood appears in Lego DC Batman: Family Matters, voiced by Jason Spisak. This version left Batman due to believing that he did not care about him before resurfacing in the present to exact revenge on him and his allies.
- Jason Todd appears in Batman: Death in the Family (2020), voiced again by Vincent Martella. Based on the viewer's choices, Todd can either die, leading to the events of Batman: Under the Red Hood, or cheat death, with the trauma from his injuries and resentment towards Batman and the Bat Family's treatment of him leading to him seeking revenge as Hush. If the viewer has Batman sacrifice himself to save Todd, the latter will either attempt to avenge him by becoming Red Robin or uphold his moral code as the Red Hood.
- An alternate universe version of Jason Todd named Sanjay Tawde appears in Batman: The Doom That Came to Gotham, voiced by Karan Brar.
- The Batman Ninja incarnation of Jason Todd / Red Hood appears in Batman Ninja vs. Yakuza League, voiced again by Akira Ishida in the Japanese version and David Matranga in the English dub.
- Jason Todd as Robin appears via flashbacks in Batman: Knightfall, voiced by Max Mittelman.

=== Video games ===
- Jason Todd as the Arkham Knight (see below) appears as a playable character in the mobile version of Injustice: Gods Among Us.
- Jason Todd as Robin and the Red Hood appears as a character summon in Scribblenauts Unmasked: A DC Comics Adventure.
- Jason Todd appears as a boss in Batman: Arkham Knight, voiced by Troy Baker. In flashbacks, while operating as Robin, he was captured and brought to Arkham Asylum to be tortured by the Joker, who intended to break his will and turn him against Batman. Eventually, the Joker filmed himself shooting Todd and sent the footage to Batman to torment him. In the intervening years, Todd escaped, used Batman's teachings to form a militia capable of countering him, became the titular Arkham Knight, and joined forces with the Scarecrow, among other villains, to kill Batman. Batman eventually reaches out to Todd, who abandons the Arkham Knight identity, becomes the Red Hood, and helps him defeat the Scarecrow. Additionally, Todd as the Red Hood is a playable character via a self-titled DLC, which takes place after the main game's events.
- Jason Todd as the Red Hood appears as a downloadable playable character in Injustice 2, voiced by Cameron Bowen.
- Jason Todd as Robin appears in Batman: Arkham VR, voiced again by Troy Baker.
- Jason Todd as the Red Hood appears as a playable character in Gotham Knights, voiced by Stephen Oyoung. This version is a member of the titular Gotham Knights.
- Jason Todd as the Red Hood appears as a playable character in DC: Dark Legion.
- Jason Todd as the Red Hood appears as a playable character in DC: Worlds Collide.
- Jason Todd as the Red Hood appears as a playable character in DC: Heroes and Villains.
- Jason Todd as the Red Hood appears as a playable character in DC Legends

==== Lego ====
- Jason Todd as the Red Hood appears as a playable character in Lego Batman 2: DC Super Heroes.
- Jason Todd as the Red Hood appears as a playable character in Lego Batman 3: Beyond Gotham, voiced by Troy Baker.
- Jason Todd as the Red Hood appears as a playable character in Lego DC Super-Villains, voiced again by Cameron Bowen.

=== Miscellaneous ===
- Jason Todd as Robin appears in All-New Batman: The Brave and the Bold #13.
- The Batman: Arkham incarnation of Jason Todd appears in the prequel comic Batman: Arkham Knight – Genesis, which expands on Todd's history. After his origin story plays out similarly to his comics counterpart post-Crisis on Infinite Earths, and following his capture and torture by the Joker, Todd survives his seemingly fatal gunshot wound thanks to hidden body armor. He then continues to be held captive by the Joker and Deathstroke, until he convinces the latter to help him by offering him a larger fee. After escaping from Arkham Asylum, Todd hacks into one of Bruce Wayne's bank accounts to pay Deathstroke, and uses the leftover money to plan his revenge over the course of two years. Todd later re-encounters the Joker, but spares him after the latter reveals he deliberately allowed Todd to escape and work with Deathstroke to guide him on his current path. Following this, Todd uses his remaining funds to become the Arkham Knight and create a militia to oppose Batman. He also kills the Electrocutioner and allies with the Scarecrow, leading to the events of Batman: Arkham Knight.
- The Injustice incarnation of Jason Todd appears in the Injustice 2 prequel comic. Following his death at the Joker's hands and subsequent resurrection by Ra's al Ghul, Todd works for the latter as a gun-wielding Batman copycat before Damian Wayne convinces him to turn against Ra's.
- Jason Todd as the Red Hood appears in Batman: The Adventures Continue. This version possesses white streaks in his hair due to the Joker electrocuting him. He initially appears as a mysterious, shadowy figure spying on the Bat Family before revealing himself to seek revenge on the Joker and Batman in his dead brother Daniel's memory.
- Jason Todd as the Red Hood appears in the Webtoon webcomic Batman: Wayne Family Adventures.
- Jason Todd as the Red Hood appears in the Webtoon webcomic Red Hood: Outlaws (2022—2023)

== See also ==
- List of DC Comics characters
- Robin (character)
