= Hippolyta (DC Comics) =

DC Comics character

- Hippolyta of the Infinite Frontier era, as depicted in Trial of the Amazons crossover. Art by Joëlle Jones

Publication information
- Publisher: DC Comics
- First appearance: All Star Comics #8 (October 21, 1941) (Note: All Star Comics #8 was cover-dated December–January 1941–1942, but published October 21, 1941.); As Wonder Woman: Wonder Woman (vol. 2) #128 (December 1997)
- Created by: William Moulton Marston (writer); Harry G. Peter (artist)

In-story information
- Species: Amazon
- Team affiliations: Amazons of Themyscira; Justice Society of America; All-Star Squadron; Justice League
- Notable aliases: Shim'Tar; Wonder Woman II
- Abilities: Superhuman physical abilities; Heightened wisdom; Self-sustenance; Enhanced senses; Immortality; Expert hand-to-hand combatant

Queen Hippolyta is a superhero appearing in American comic books published by DC Comics. She is the mother of Wonder Woman, and based on the Amazon queen Hippolyta from Greek mythology. Introduced in 1941 during the Golden Age of Comic Books, she is the queen of the Amazons of Themyscira, and in some continuities, the adopted mother of Donna Troy.

Cloris Leachman, Carolyn Jones and Beatrice Straight portrayed the character in the 1970s Wonder Woman series. Hippolyta made her cinematic debut in the DC Extended Universe 2017 film Wonder Woman, played by Connie Nielsen; she reappeared in the 2017 film Justice League (as well as Zack Snyder's 2021 cut) and the 2020 film Wonder Woman 1984.

== Publication history ==
=== Golden Age ===
The character Hippolyta (initially spelled "Hippolyte") first appeared in All Star Comics #8 (December 1941) in the same story that introduced her daughter, Princess Diana, known as Wonder Woman. Created by writer William Moulton Marston and artist Harry G. Peter, this original version of the character is a brunette like Diana.

Golden Age Hippolyta as depicted in her first appearance, from All Star Comics #8 (December 1941). Art by Harry G. Peter.

In the story, Hippolyte and the Amazons once resided in "Amazonia" in the days of ancient Greece, until they were beguiled and bested by the demi-god Hercules, who had been inspired by the God of War Mars, to go after her. She was able to beat him thanks to the magic girdle, but he seduced her, and tricked her into removing the girdle, allowing him to steal it. This caused the Amazons to lose their super strength and the favor of their patron goddess, Aphrodite. Eventually she and the other Amazons were forgiven, but had to wear bracelets to remind them of the folly of submitting to men. To regain their status, the Amazons were decreed to leave the mortal world and relocate to Paradise Island. There they established their own society, free from the evils of man's world. So long as they remained there and Hippolyte retained possession of her magic girdle, the Amazons would be immortal. Much of this history was adapted, varied, and expanded upon in the modern version of the Wonder Woman comics.

For the most part, Hippolyte remained on Paradise Island during the Golden Age era, rarely interacting with the modern world to which her daughter had journeyed. Her role was that of the Amazon Queen and mentor to Wonder Woman. She was devoted to the Olympian goddesses, particularly the Amazons' patron Aphrodite, and was adamant that man never be allowed to set foot on Paradise Island. Although she remained mainly on the island, in one story from Sensation Comics #26 (reprinted in Wonder Woman: The Complete History), Hippolyte travels to Man's World and briefly assumes the role of Wonder Woman. In the first appearance of Villainy inc she is kidnapped to lure Wonder Woman into a trap.

In the late 1950s, DC Comics introduced the concept of the Multiverse, and the Golden Age Hippolyte was established as existing on the world known as Earth-Two. The last appearance of this incarnation of Hippolyte was in Wonder Woman (vol. 1) #97 in April 1958, after which the focus shifted from Earth-Two to the more modern versions of the characters on Earth-One.

=== Silver and Bronze Ages ===
The Silver and Bronze Age Hippolyta was depicted as blonde. From Wonder Woman (vol.1) #105 (April 1959).

As of Wonder Woman (vol. 1) #98 (May 1958), the Amazon Queen's name was spelled "Hippolyta", and she was depicted with blonde hair and a triple-pointed tiara. The backstory of this Silver Age Hippolyta was largely identical to the Golden Age version, with some exceptions. For example, it was established in a 1973 storyline that Hippolyta had crafted a second daughter from clay, a dark-skinned Amazon named Nubia who was to be Wonder Woman's sister before she was spirited away by the god Mars. Hippolyta was also the adoptive mother of Donna Troy, who had been rescued from a fire and brought to Paradise Island. As before, Hippolyta's role in the Silver Age era was primarily that of Paradise Island's queen and mentor to Wonder Woman. She was frequently shown interacting with her daughter as well as supporting characters of the era such as Wonder Girl and Wonder Tot. According to the DC Comics 1976 calendar, Hippolyta was born on January 8.

Hippolyta was also instrumental in several of the continuity shake-ups for the Earth-One Wonder Woman. Enraged that her daughter, recovering from amnesia, had submitted to trials by the Justice League to prove her worth to rejoin, she created her own test which involved resurrecting Steve Trevor to lead an assault on Paradise Island. The goddess Aphrodite granted Diana's wish to allow the resurrected Trevor to continue living (although he was later revealed to be Eros animating Trevor's body). After Trevor had again been killed and a grief-stricken Diana returned home, Hippolyta erased Diana's memories of him; when a Trevor from a parallel universe burst through the barriers between worlds and crashed off Paradise Island, Hippolyta asked Aphrodite to alter the memories of the entire world to allow the new Trevor to embark upon a life on Earth-One.

In 1985, the Crisis on Infinite Earths miniseries revised DC Comics continuity and combined the multiple Earths into one world. The modern version of Hippolyta would combine elements of her earlier incarnations and take on greater importance in the series.

=== Modern Age ===
Hippolyta as she appears from the 1987 reboot until 2011's The New 52. Art by Phil Jimenez (2002).

==== Origin ====
Hippolyta's origins underwent a revision after writer George Pérez's revamp of Wonder Woman in 1987. In that continuity, Hippolyta and the rest of the Themyscirian Amazons were reincarnated women who merged with clay in the Aegean Sea to form new bodies. Hippolyta was the first to emerge, and was thus declared Queen of the Amazons. The second Amazon to break the surface was her sister Antiope and she ruled at Hippolyta's side. Each of the goddesses then blessed the Amazon nation with gifts: hunting skills and superhuman abilities such as superhuman strength, speed, durability, enhanced senses, healing factor and agility(Artemis), wisdom (Athena), warm homes (Hestia), plentiful harvests (Demeter), and beauty inside and out (Aphrodite). As a symbol of their responsibilities, the goddesses gave Hippolyta and Antiope each a Golden Girdle of Gaea. The Amazons eventually founded the city of Themyscira in Anatolia and became known as fierce warriors of peace in Turkey, Greece, and Rome.

==== Heracles ====
The jealous and vengeful god Ares tried to drive a wedge between Amazons and other civilizations by influencing his half-brother, the demi-god Heracles to challenge the Amazons. When Heracles first approached the Amazons seeking battle, Hippolyta met him outside the city gates and tried to employ peaceful negotiations. When this did not work, Heracles attacked the Amazon Queen. Hippolyta easily turned the tables on him by using her wisdom and battle skills to subdue him. Still wishing peace, Hippolyta invited Heracles and his men into their city to celebrate a potential friendship with a feast. Heracles seemingly accepted the invitation.

Once in their city, Heracles and his men drugged the Amazons' wine and took them prisoner. After the theft of Hippolyta's Golden Girdle and abuse and rape of the Amazons, Hippolyta cried out to Athena to help them escape their bonds. Athena said that she would only aid them on the condition that the Amazons not seek retribution against Heracles and his men as that would be beneath the ideals of the Amazons. Hippolyta agreed and her bonds were broken. Hippolyta freed the other Amazons. The Amazons, however, were filled with hate and the desire for revenge. Breaking Hippolyta's oath to Athena, the Amazons began slaughtering their captors (Heracles and his general Theseus had left).

After they had killed all the men keeping them prisoners, Antiope renounced all ties to the Olympian gods and said goodbye to her sister Hippolyta, giving Hippolyta her Golden Girdle of Gaea to replace the one stolen by Heracles. She left to pursue vengeance, intending to kill Heracles and Theseus. Antiope's tribe later became the Amazons of Bana-Mighdall.

==== Godly penance ====
Hippolyta and the remaining faithful Amazons then went to the sea shore where Athena told them their punishment for betraying their ideals. They were to be given immortality so that they could forever safeguard a doorway to a place of unspeakable evil. The doorway was on a far-off isolated island and it took months to get there. To guide their way, the god Poseidon cleared a pathway for them across the seas. Once they arrived, the Amazons created a new city and named their new home Themyscira, after their previous fallen city. The Amazons continued to live on the island guarding this "Doom's Doorway" (later shown to also lead to other places such as parts of Hades) and paying homage to their gods for three-thousand years.

==== Diana's birth ====
Hippolyta began to ache for something unknown. She was told by the oracle Menalippe that the yearning she felt was for her unborn daughter. She was instructed to go to the beach and form a figure of an infant out of the island's clay. The original five goddesses, plus Hermes, united to incarnate and bless this final soul. They imbued it with many gifts and merged it with the clay form and, just as with the previous Amazons, the clay was changed into flesh and blood. Hippolyta named the child Diana, after a "great and holy warrior," a stranger who had washed ashore on the island and died helping the Amazons defeat Cottus, a creature escaping Doom's Doorway. This Diana was later revealed to be the mother of Steve Trevor, who as a pilot had crashed near the island in the 1940s.

==== Return of Heracles ====
During Diana's Challenge of the Gods storyline, she discovered that Heracles was transformed into a colossal stone pillar within Doom's Doorway, and was supporting Themyscira's weight for several millennia. In this state, he was tormented and scarred by various mythological creatures, feeling the pain inflicted by them but not being able to do anything about it (much like Prometheus). This was the punishment given to him for his past transgressions. Thanks to Diana, Hippolyta, and the Lasso of Truth, he was restored to his original form and begged the Amazons for forgiveness. Though some of the Amazons still harbored anger for their past humiliation, most of them were moved by Heracles' newfound humility, and Queen Hippolyta asked her people to search their hearts for the strength to forgive, which they almost immediately did. Doing so herself, Hippolyta not only forgave Heracles, but shared a brief kiss with him before he left the mortal realm to return to his father in Olympus.

==== Return to the outside world ====
After Diana's completion of her challenge, the Amazons were released from their punishment by the Olympian gods. They were free to live out their lives any way they saw fit while retaining their immortality. To celebrate, Hippolyta declared that Themyscira would finally create cultural exchange with the outside world. Diana became Themyscira's ambassador to the United Nations.

In spreading the Amazon ideals of love and peace, Diana made a powerful enemy, the sorceress Circe. One of Circe's attacks on Diana involved the brainwashing of Hippolyta, transforming her into the second Shim'Tar, or chief warrior, of the Amazons of Bana-Mighdall. In this persona, Hippolyta attacked Diana, and was defeated by a ricochet from Diana's bracelets.

Circe considered all Amazons to be her enemy and later made a new plan for revenge. She teleported the Amazons of Bana-Mighdall to Themyscira on the pretense that they were to take the island. While the two groups fought, Circe teleported the island to a dimension of demons. There the two groups of Amazons were forced to put aside their rivalry to stave off the demons' attacks. The Amazons remained in the demon dimension until Diana discovered what had happened and forced Circe to return the island back to its rightful dimension. They found upon their return that although their time in the demon dimension lasted several years, the time passed in our dimension was only a few months.

In this time, the Themyscirian and Bana-Mighdallian Amazons made an uneasy truce. The Themyscirians would live in the city while the Bana-Mighdallians would form their own settlement on the opposite side of the island. In Hippolyta's mind, she still served as Queen over all Amazons on the island, but the Bana-Mighdallian Amazons did not see it as such and tensions between the two tribes remained.

==== Motherly deception ====
Because the demon dimension they were in was magic based, Hippolyta began to receive dreams and visions of the future. In one such dream, she foresaw Wonder Woman's death. Fearful for her daughter's welfare, she put into motion a plan to remove Diana from her role as Wonder Woman and transfer the title of Themyscira's Champion to another Amazon. Thus a new contest for the title was made though, she kept her true reasons for calling the new contest to herself alone. Initially, Hippolyta thought the Amazons of Bana-Mighdall were not worthy to enter the contest but when Diana, angered at her mother's treatment of the new Amazons, called a vote on the whole to see if her people also agreed that they should be allowed to participate, the answer was yes. Suddenly inspired, Hippolyta noticed that the Bana-Mighdallian's most likely warrior to win was the Amazon Artemis. Hippolyta, then, in secret, went to the Themyscirian Amazon mystic Magala. She had Magala transfer half of Diana's gods-given powers over to Artemis for Artemis' victory to be better equipped. Hippolyta also provided many additional obstacles for Diana to encounter during her contest trials for her to become sidetracked from the goal of winning. Due to her actions, Artemis became the contest's winner and the new champion Wonder Woman. Later, when Diana began to receive visions of the past, she confronted her mother on why she really called for a new contest. When Hippolyta told her, her and Diana's relationship became scarred, as Diana never truly forgave her mother for knowingly sending another Amazon to her death.

==== Wonder Woman ====
After Artemis was killed in battle, the title of Wonder Woman was returned to Diana. This sent Hippolyta into a deep depression as she realized she was the cause of an innocent's death. Hippolyta gave command to the Amazon General Philippus and went into self-imposed banishment.

Hippolyta boarded a small boat and let it cast adrift. She eventually landed in Louisiana, where she met a psychic named Angela. After becoming friends with Angela and her family, Angela informed Hippolyta that her daughter was in serious danger. Rushing to her aid, Hippolyta arrived too late to save Diana from the demon Neron, as Diana was still suffering from the spell that had reduced her strength. Thus, Hippolyta's vision of her daughter dying as Wonder Woman came true.

Hippolyta as Wonder Woman from Wonder Woman (vol. 2) #130 (Feb. 1998). Art by John Byrne and Patricia Mulvihill.

Diana, after her death, was granted divinity as the Goddess of Truth by her gods for such faithful devotion. During her brief time as a god of Olympus, Diana was replaced in the role of Wonder Woman by her mother. As opposed to Diana receiving the title in honor, Hippolyta's role as Wonder Woman was meant to be a punishment for her betrayal in Artemis' death as well as for unintentionally killing her own daughter. However, Hippolyta eventually grew to enjoy the freedom and adventure the title came with. Whereas Diana used the Lasso of Truth as her primary weapon, Hippolyta favored a broadsword and wore a short blue skirt instead of briefs.

John Byrne, the writer that introduced the concept of Hippolyta as the first Wonder Woman, has explained his intentions in a post in his message board:

I thought George's one "mistake" in rebooting Wonder Woman was making her only 25 years old when she left Paradise Island. I preferred the idea of a Diana who was thousands of years old (as, if I recall correctly, she was in the TV series). From that angle, I would have liked to have seen Diana having been Wonder Woman in WW2, and be returning to our world in the reboot.

Not having that option, I took the next best course, and had Hippolyta fill that role.

As Wonder Woman, Queen Hippolyta immediately got involved in a time travel mission back to the 1940s with Jay Garrick. After this mission, she elected to join the Justice Society of America and remained in that era for eight years, where her teammates nicknamed her "Polly." During that time, she had a relationship with Ted Grant. Hippolyta also made visits into the past to see her godchild Lyta, daughter of Hippolyta's protege Helena, the Golden Age Fury. These visits happened yearly from young Lyta's perspective and also accounted for Hippolyta's participation in the JSA/JLA team ups. When she returned from the past, Hippolyta took Diana's place in the JLA as well.

Eventually, Diana gave up her godhood and returned to her role as Wonder Woman. Still clinging to her newfound sense of freedom, Hippolyta did not wish to relinquish her title as Wonder Woman (even though she admitted her daughter looked "better in a bathing suit" than she did), leaving two different Wonder Women acting in the same role at the same time. Diana was often unhappy with Hippolyta's continued role as Wonder Woman as she felt Hippolyta was ignoring her true duties as ruler of Themyscira, thus further inciting the antagonism between mother and daughter.

Around this time, Hippolyta discovered that the hero Donna Troy was actually a mirror image of her daughter Diana, brought to life through Themyscirian sorceries. Though Hippolyta had met Donna on previous adventures, when the two women met again after learning this fact, Hippolyta accepted Donna as a second daughter and held a coronation on the island, proclaiming Donna to be the second Amazon princess and an heir to the Themyscirian throne.

On one visit to the island, Diana discovered that the two tribes of Amazons were on the verge of a civil war due to unresolved issues and mysterious acts of sabotage made on the Bana-Mighdallian's construction of their city. When both Diana and Donna confronted Hippolyta about her inaction of rule at such a dangerous time, Hippolyta became very upset with her two daughters and told them that she intended to continue her role as Wonder Woman in the outside world and that Diana and Donna were to rule the island in her absence. Unfortunately, the civil war took place, after all, and many Amazons on both sides were killed. Returning to the island, Hippolyta and Diana agreed to denounce their royal titles for both Amazon tribes to have an opportunity for peace, having both tribes gain equal footing in united rule.

==== Death ====
Hippolyta continued to establish a distinguished career as Wonder Woman. The Queen enjoyed her role in the Justice Society and became accustomed to life in the United States. Mother and daughter fought on several occasions over Hippolyta's past expected roles — hero or queen — and their differences were unresolved when the queen sacrificed herself to save the Earth from Imperiex during the Imperiex War featured in Our Worlds at War. Ironically, Hippolyta died at the birthplace of the Amazons, near the Aegean Sea in Greece. However, she was allowed to see her daughter one last time and say goodbye. She, the spirit of her sister Antiope, and Steve Trevor's mother Diana Rockwell Trevor became ghostly guardians of the island watching over both tribes as their distant and former queens.

==== One Year Later ====
During the Amazons Attack storyline, the witch Circe revived Hippolyta and showed her that the U.S. government illegally kidnapped her daughter Diana. She was being tortured until she gave over the plans on how the U.S. government could create their own Purple Ray to be used as a weapon. Angered over this, Hippolyta resumed leadership of the Amazons and had them attack the city of Washington, D.C. in the hopes of rescuing Diana and serving their own form of justice against the world for their actions. They are shown using winged steeds, and other mythical creatures. During battle Hippolyta discovered that Circe had secretly planned to detonate a nuclear weapon on Themyscira and gained her revenge on the traitor by impaling the sorceress with a battle spear through the chest. Wonder Woman has an opportunity to kill her mother but does not take it, instead giving the knife to Hippolyta, who will not kill her daughter. Despite the fact that Circe is supposedly dead, Hippolyta seems fully intent on continuing her assault on the United States, even issuing an attack on other locations, including Kansas. Her more chaotic and malicious actions start to concern her Amazon generals. It is later learned that Circe used a portion of her own soul to revive Hippolyta from death. Because of this Hippolyta's persona was tainted by the witch's evil and thus Hippolyta is now a more blood-thirsty being than before.

At the conclusion of the war all of the Amazons are given false identities and scattered throughout the world. Hippolyta is spared but is banished to live alone on Themyscira, by what appears to be Athena but is later revealed to be the villainous Granny Goodness, who along with the other New Gods of Apokolips have imprisoned the Greek deities. In Countdown to Final Crisis, Hippolyta lives in hiding from Granny Goodness and her new brand of Amazons, human recruits being trained as a new generation of her Female Furies. With the help of island castaways Holly Robinson (briefly known as Catwoman), Harley Quinn and a powerless Mary Marvel, Hippolyta is able to drive Granny out of Themyscira and back to Apokolips. After the Greek Gods are freed by Mary, Granny is murdered by the mysterious Godkiller, leaving Hippolyta once more as the Queen of Themyscira.

==== The Circle ====
During her isolation Hippolyta travels to the four corners of Themyscira, speaking to an Amazon prisoner at each point, asking them to repent, to which each prisoner replies, "Never". However, the fourth and last prisoner, whom Hippolyta identifies as Alkyone, presents her with a wooden tiara with the words "Our Queen" across it similar to the one she and Diana both wore as Wonder Woman. Alkyone tells Hippolyta since she denied her the use of any blades, she gnawed in the inscription with her teeth. She goes on to accuse Hippolyta of betrayal for birthing "The Dragon", which clearly is a reference to Diana. Alkyone begs her to kill Diana and let them be a tribe again, but Hippolyta adamantly refuses. Alkyone then tells Hippolyta to tell Diana the truth, but again Hippolyta refuses and breaks the wooden tiara in half. As she leaves, Alkyone vows to save Hippolyta and make them a tribe again by killing Diana.

Alkyone's past reveals her to have been a member of Hippolyta's Royal Guard along with three other Amazons—Myrto, Charis and Philomela, charged with her personal protection. They were viewed as too brutal-minded and overzealous by General Philippus, captain of the General Amazon Guard, a viewpoint that was later proven when Alkyone learned that Hippolyta desired a child. This came to a head when Alkyone learned from the Amazon sorceress, Magala that another Amazon named Gennes had supposedly given birth to a daughter. But it turned out the baby was nothing more than a clay doll carved in the image of a child. Concluding Gennes had gone mad, Alkyone ordered that no such dolls were ever to be crafted on Themyscira again. After that, she ordered Gennes to be killed. In the present day, the army of Captain Nazi lands on Themyscira, intending to claim it for themselves. Alerted to their arrival, Hippolyta cuts her hair and readies herself for battle and vows to redeem herself for all the mistakes she has made since her resurrection. Elsewhere on the island, Alkyone offers her help and the rest of the former Royal Guard to the soldiers in hunting down Hippolyta in exchange for their release.

==== Wonder Woman – The Movie ====
In Wonder Woman issues 24 and 25, there is a movie being made about Diana. In the beginning of issue 24, Diana brings Thomas Andrew Tresser home to meet her mother, Queen Hippolyta. Hippolyta takes Tresser and leaves Diana alone on the beach. This is her opportunity to get to know the man in whom her daughter has become interested. The getting to know him phase includes taking Tom to the Royal Menagerie to hand feed Griffins of Myth. While there Hippolyta asks rather directly if he and Diana have had sex yet. Flustered he is able to honestly answer that they haven't. She asks Tom, "Will you protect her, keep her from harm, if you are able?" He replies, "Yes. That I can promise. Although it usually goes the other way 'round, to be blunt." Before he leaves she gives him a spear she has made, grants him the title Sir Thomas of Cleveland, and makes him a guardsman of Themyscira. As Diana and Tom prepare to leave she requests one thing of her new guardsman, babies. As many as he and Diana can create as quickly as they can create them. As they leave the island Alkyone is seen watching them from shore as they float away on a giant shell.

==== Past Imperfect ====
Following the events of Wonder Woman #600, the timeline is altered by the Greek Gods and Hippolyta's history is radically changed once again. Here, Themyscira is invaded by a heavily armed paramilitary group while Diana is still a child, and the majority of the Amazons are wiped out in the ensuing battle. Hippolyta is able to save Diana by entrusting her to several of her servants, who smuggle the child to the United States in the midst of the attack, but Hippolyta herself is ultimately captured by the enemy soldiers. After being bound and presented to the leader of the invaders, Hippolyta commits suicide by throwing herself into a massive fire being used to incinerate the dead Amazons, choosing to die rather than submit to her captors. After Wonder Woman's exile in the altered continuity is reversed, Hippolyta is briefly restored to her Modern Age origins, greeting her daughter back and approving the changes she had done to her attitude and appearance during her ordeal.

=== The New 52 ===
New 52 version of Hippolyta, from Wonder Woman (vol. 4) #2 (December 2011). Art by Cliff Chiang.

In the 2011 New 52 reboot of DC's continuity, Hippolyta is depicted as blonde, and instead of fashioning Diana from clay, she bore her daughter from a relationship with Zeus, hidden by a lie to protect Diana from Hera's rage. This origin of Diana as the biological child of Zeus and Hippolyta has been the canon origin of Wonder Woman since then, replacing the clay origin.

After the truth about Diana's birth is revealed, Hera, the queen of the Greek gods, appears on Paradise Island to punish Hippolyta: not for having an affair with her husband, but for having been too weak to resist Zeus' manipulation. Hippolyta had predicted this, and asks Hera to take her life in exchange of letting Diana live. However, Hera changes her mind at the last second, and instead of killing Hippolyta, turns her into stone and the rest of the Amazons, minus Diana, into snakes, thus destroying Wonder Woman's home and her only family.

=== DC Rebirth ===
Hippolyta of the DC Rebirth era, as depicted in Wonder Woman (vol. 5) #2 (September 2016). Art by Nicola Scott.

In 2016, DC Comics implemented a relaunch of its books called "DC Rebirth", which restored its continuity to a form much as it was prior to "The New 52". Hippolyta once again goes through a major change. In the "Year One" storyline, Hippolyta is presented like the Golden Age version with black hair and has a peaceful demeanor. When Steve Trevor lands on the island and is the only survivor of the soldiers, she seeks to have him sent home safely by hosting a competition to determine which Amazon is worthy. She quickly realizes her daughter will be the one to win, something that saddens her since leaving the island forsakes an Amazon's right to return. However, she is nevertheless proud when Diana wins, and they bid each other goodbye.

In the story arc "The Lies", Wonder Woman and Steve seemingly return to Themyscira to find Hippolyta (the New 52 one) and the Amazons safe and sound, despite Wonder Woman remembering her apparent demise. Hippolyta does not understand what she means and only seems suspicious of Steve, telling Diana not to let him wander around alone. However, Diana and Steve begin to notice the inconsistencies: the Amazons are not familiar, they speak English instead of their ancient language, and their architecture has changed. Diana realizes this is because what she thought to be true was a lie: she never returned to Themyscira when she left years before, so the New 52 Hippolyta was an illusion.

In the present day, Hippolyta and the Amazons notice a strange tree growing on the island that serves as a bad omen of events to come. Any attempts to cut down the tree are futile, and Hippolyta worries Diana is in danger. She and her fellow Amazons go to the tree and combat Deimos and Phobos, Ares' sons in wolf-like forms before they are defeated on the other side by Diana. Hippolyta is briefly reunited with her daughter but unable to reach her, stating how proud she is of who Diana has become.

In Doomsday Clock, Hippolyta is informed that Wonder Woman will be further injured in her fight with Black Adam during his attack on the United Nations. In response, she sends the Amazons to return Wonder Woman to Themyscira.

In a flashback in Endless Winter, Hippolyta works with Swamp Thing, the Viking Prince, and Black Adam to battle the Frost King in the 10th century.

In Infinite Frontier, after Diana sacrificed her life in order to save the multiverse, Hippolyta steps up to replace her daughter on the Justice League, as Wonder Woman, leaving Nubia as Queen of Themyscira. Later, after Diana returns to the living, Hippolyta continues as the League's Wonder Woman while her daughter goes on other adventures as Wonder Woman. Later, Diana returns to the League, and Hippolyta sets in motion a series of events that lead to her own death for mysterious reasons, prompting Trial of the Amazons (2022). Later, she is shown to have ascended to Olympus to become a god.

=== Wonder Woman Historia: The Amazons ===
To celebrate the 80th anniversary of Wonder Woman, Kelly Sue DeConnick had retconned Hippolyta's origin in Wonder Woman Historia: The Amazons. Inspired by George Pérez's reworking of Wonder Woman, the three-issue limited series was illustrated by Phil Jimenez, Gene Ha, and Nicola Scott.

In Wonder Woman Historia: the Amazons, Hippolyta starts out as a midwife's widowed assistant rather than a founding Amazon member. After being ordered to abandon an unwanted newborn girl, Hippolyta changes her mind, racing against the elements to save the baby and encounters the Amazons when they rescue her from male traffickers. Created by the goddesses Hestia, Artemis, Demeter, Hecate, Aphrodite, and Athena from murdered women's souls at the Well of the Lost, the Amazons have one goal: bringing to justice men who abuse women. Composed of six tribes, each with its own queen and patron goddess, the thirty Amazons travel the ancient world to rescue women from traffickers whom they kill in acts of vigilantism; however, the Amazons only go on their missions at night when Artemis can watch over them, and hide themselves during the day to keep their existence a secret from the male gods, especially the womanizing Zeus.

Despite the Amazons being her own idea, Hera spies on them with a bird formed from the abandoned girl's soul. Hippolyta swears her life to Artemis, gaining the strength, beauty, and wisdom of an Amazon. She then forms a new tribe, made up of Amazons who are trained from young girls rescued from evil men, and with all six creator goddesses as their patrons. But one day when the sun is up, one of the young Amazons kills a murdered trafficker's son praying to Apollo, exposing the female warriors' existence to the male gods. Enraged by what they view as sacrilege, the gods unite their followers into a great army to destroy the Amazons.

As the Amazons battle against the gods and their soldiers, Hippolyta leads them all as their sole queen. But when the Amazons suffer many losses, Hippolyta travels to Olympus and makes a bargain with Zeus: her sisters' lives in exchange for their freedom. Except for the one who had killed the boy in Apollo's temple, all the Amazons, dead and living, are given long lives yet are forever imprisoned on Themyscira, where are they allowed to do as they please while under the sun god's watch; once a month, Artemis is allowed temporary guardianship of the warriors she had helped create. Grieving over depriving her sisters their freedom, Hippolyta makes a clay baby girl, whom the seven goddesses bless with gifts and reincarnate from the soul of the very child the Queen of the Amazons was ordered to abandon. Named after the moon goddess, Diana will grow up to become Wonder Woman and continue her mother and their sister Amazons' fight for women's justice.

== Powers and abilities ==
Hippolyta has 3,000 years of combat experience, providing her expertise in both hand-to-hand combat as well as with hand-held weapons. As a Themyscirian Amazon she is ageless and immortal, allowing her to live indefinitely without physically aging beyond her youthful prime, though she could still die if severely injured. As typical of Amazons she is extremely strong, being able to break apart steel and concrete with her bare hands and jump over 25 feet from a standing position. She is also highly durable, heals quickly, and highly intelligent, being able to absorb and process vast amounts of knowledge in a short period of time.

Similar to other Amazons, Hippolyta can relieve her body of physical injury and toxins by becoming one with the Earth's soil and then reforming her body whole again. The first time Diana does this she prays to her god Gaea saying: "Gaea, I pray to you. Grant me your strength. You are the Earth who suckled me, who nurtured and bred me. Through you all life is renewed. The circle which never ends. I pray you, mother Gaea, take me into your bosom. Please, let me be worthy." During writer John Byrne's time on the comic it was stated that this is a very sacred ritual to the Themyscirians, only to be used in the most dire of circumstances.

As an Amazon, Hippolyta had access to a number of magical artifacts. These artifacts included the Gauntlet of Atlas, which greatly increased her overall strength and durability, as well as the Sandals of Hermes, which increased her speed and allowed her to fly. During her time as Wonder Woman, Hippolyta wielded the Lasso of Truth, though she seemed to prefer a broadsword and shield in combat. Her broadsword was created by Hephaestus and was sharp enough to slice the electrons off of an atom.

In her second tenure as Wonder Woman on the modern-day Justice League, Hippolyta is shown to have greatly enhanced strength and the ability to fly. When she acquired the ability to fly is not explicitly given.

== Other versions ==
- An alternate timeline version of Hippolyta appears in the Flashpoint event. This version was killed by Artemis, who sided with Ocean Master.
- An alternate universe version of Hippolyta appears in Absolute Wonder Woman. This version, in addition to all other Amazons, were imprisoned on Themyscira by Zeus for an unknown crime while her daughter Diana was taken from her. Initially believing she was dead, she eventually learns from a formerly lost Amazon named Io that Diana is alive.

== In other media ==
=== Television ===
==== Animation ====
- Hippolyta appears in the Challenge of the Superfriends episode "Secret Origin of the Super Friends", voiced by Marlene Aragon.
- Hippolyta appears in the Superman episode "Superman and Wonder Woman versus the Sorceress of Time", voiced by Pat Carroll.
- Hippolyta appears in series set in the DC Animated Universe (DCAU), voiced by Susan Sullivan.
  - Hippolyta first appears in Justice League. This version created Wonder Woman from clay alongside Hades and reluctantly exiled her from Themyscira to avoid incurring the Olympians' wrath after she brought the Justice League to the island to fight Felix Faust, in the process breaking the anti-man law. Additionally, Hephaestus originally created Wonder Woman's armor for Hippolyta, but claims the latter did not have the right build.
  - Hippolyta returns in the Justice League Unlimited episode "The Balance", in which she allows Wonder Woman to return to Themyscira and informs her of her full power.
- Hippolyta appears in the Batman: The Brave and the Bold episode "Triumvirate of Terror!", voiced by Tippi Hedren.
- Hippolyta appears in the Justice League Action episode "Luthor in Paradise", voiced by Julianne Grossman. This version's staff, entrusted to her by Hera, also serves as the key to a forbidden realm where the Argo's Oculus, which can grant its owner Zeus' power, is held.
- Hippolyta appears in DC Super Hero Girls (2019), voiced by Cree Summer.
- Hippolyta appears in Harley Quinn, voiced by Rachel Dratch.

==== Live action ====
- Hippolyta appears in Wonder Woman (1974), portrayed by Charlene Holt.
- Hippolyta appears in Wonder Woman (1975), portrayed by Cloris Leachman in the pilot film, Carolyn Jones in the first season, and Beatrice Straight in the second season.

=== Film ===
==== Animation ====
- Hippolyta appears in Wonder Woman (2009), voiced by Virginia Madsen. This version was romantically involved with Ares and gave birth to their son Thrax before they betrayed her. After killing Thrax in the ensuing fight, she imprisons Ares.
- Hippolyta appears in the DC Super Hero Girls (2015) spin-off films DC Super Hero Girls: Hero of the Year, DC Super Hero Girls: Intergalactic Games, and DC Super Hero Girls: Legends of Atlantis, voiced again by Julianne Grossman.
- Hippolyta appears in Wonder Woman: Bloodlines, voiced again by Cree Summer. This version refused to allow Steve Trevor to return home and disowned Diana when she chose to leave with him, though Hippolyta eventually reconciles with the latter.
- Hippolyta appears in Teen Titans Go! & DC Super Hero Girls: Mayhem in the Multiverse, voiced again by Cree Summer.
- Hippolyta appears in Justice League: Crisis on Infinite Earths, voiced by Jennifer Hale.

==== Live action ====
Hippolyta appears in films set in the DC Extended Universe (DCEU), portrayed by Connie Nielsen.

- First appearing in Wonder Woman (2017), Hippolyta, her sister General Antiope, and Lieutenant Menalippe jointly raised Diana, with Hippolyta striving to protect her daughter from the outside world and hide Diana's father's identity. After Steve Trevor crash-lands on Themyscira and reveals the war he is taking part in, Hippolyta reluctantly allows Diana to leave and help him end it.
- Hippolyta returns in Justice League and the director's cut, in which she warns Diana of Steppenwolf after he steals the Mother Box that Hippolyta and the Amazons were protecting.
- Hippolyta appears in a flashback in Wonder Woman 1984.

=== Video games ===
Hippolya appears as a character summon in Scribblenauts Unmasked: A DC Comics Adventure.

=== Miscellaneous ===
- Hippolyta appears in Smallville Season 11.
- Hippolyta appears in DC Super Hero Girls (2015), voiced by Julianne Grossman.
- Hippolyta appears in the Lego DC Super Hero Girls shorts, voiced again by Julianne Grossman.
- Hippolyta appears in the Injustice: Gods Among Us prequel comic. After Wonder Woman ends up in a coma while attempting to save Superman from Captain Atom, Hippolyta takes her back to Themyscira to heal her. However, several failed attempts lead to Hippolyta making a deal with Hera to awaken Wonder Woman in exchange for a favor to be fulfilled at a later date. Eventually, Hera calls in the favor by ordering Hippolyta to lead the Amazons in attacking Superman's Regime. Due to Wonder Woman being part of the Regime, a reluctant Hippolyta refuses and is imprisoned in Tartarus by Hera and Zeus alongside Harley Quinn and Billy Batson until Harley breaks them out and the trio escape using a Mother Box before eventually meeting Wonder Woman and Batman. Hippolyta later joins Wonder Woman in fighting the Olympians until Highfather intervenes and convinces the latter group to leave Earth and sever ties with the Amazons. Following this, Hippolyta encourages Wonder Woman to stay by Superman's side.
- Hippolyta appears in the Injustice 2 prequel comic. Following the Regime's fall and Wonder Woman's imprisonment in Themyscira for her role in the Regime, Hippolyta attempts to convince her to change her ways. However, Wonder Woman refuses, calling her a coward for not trying to better man's world herself.

== See also ==
- List of Wonder Woman supporting characters
- List of Wonder Woman enemies
