= Shim'Tar =

- The original Shim'Tar

Publication information
- Publisher: DC Comics
- First appearance: Wonder Woman #33 (vol. 2) (August 1989)
- Created by: George Pérez

In-story information
- Alter ego: I: Unknown; II: Queen Hippolyta; III: Akila; IV: Artemis.
- Team affiliations: Amazons
- Abilities: Trained in high levels of hand-to-hand combat; Expertise in a wide array of weapons.

Shim'Tar is a fictional character owned by DC Comics and was co-created by penciler Chris Marrinan and writer George Pérez. The name Shim'Tar is also a title given to the chief warrior of the Bana-Mighdall tribe of Amazons.

== Fictional character biography ==
Rather than a single person, "Shim'Tar" is an interchangeable title for the chief warrior of the Bana-Mighdall Amazons. This is similar to how the title of Wonder Woman is classified as the chief warrior of the Themyscirian tribe of Amazons. The title of Shim'Tar is chosen through the Tournament of the Crown, a rite of combat.

=== Original Shim'Tar ===
Wonder Woman's initial contact with the first Shim'tar occurred when her Lasso of Truth was stolen by her enemy The Cheetah. The chase led them both to Egypt. There, Diana found a lost tribe of Amazons in the city of Bana-Mighdall. These Amazons, she discovered, were apparently descendants to her aunt Antiope. A dissident of that tribe named Faruka plotted to become that tribe's queen. She chose a powerful unnamed Amazon to act as her enforcer. Calling herself Shim'Tar, this warrior had cybernetic implants that not only greatly enhanced her strength, but also provided her with laser capabilities and durability. After killing the desert Amazon tribe's regent queen, Shim'Tar battled Diana at Faruka's request. She proved to be more than a match for Diana. Diana was unable to defeat the superior Shim'Tar in direct combat; in much of the battle, Shim'Tar gives Diana a brutal and thorough beating. Diana barely managed to defeat Shim'Tar and was only able to defeat her by ensnaring her in her golden lasso. She discovered that the Shim'Tar warrior gained the majority of her enormous power by wearing the Golden Girdle of Gaea; it is possible that the original Shim'tar's superiority over Diana was due to Shim'Tar's possession of the Girdle, in addition to her cybernetic implants. This Shim'Tar seemingly died when the Amazon city was attacked by the Egyptian military and Olympian god Hermes, causing a massive explosion. This first Shim'Tar's true identity remains a mystery to this day.

The writer who conceived the Shim'Tar character (George Pérez) seems to have created the character as a post-Crisis version, or alternate reality version, of an already existing Wonder Woman villain named Doctor Cyber. This is verified by her position in a poster he created called the Wonder Woman Through the Ages Poster. Shim'Tar is placed right above the pre-Crisis version of Doctor Cyber, maintaining a variant character pattern that is visible between other Wonder Woman villains.

Additionally, Shim'tar's upbringing and heritage as a champion within a city protected by a mystical barrier (a tornadic magical sandstorm), her mysterious connection to Hipoltya and Wonder Woman, due to her curly hair, skin colour (until then, Shim'tar was the only Bana mighdalian possessing white skin which resembles a reversal of Nu'bia's background that made her the black sister of Wonder Woman and the only pre-Crisis amazon with black skin) and masked appearance, seem to be references to another character of pre-Crisis continuity, Nu'Bia, that also made her debut using an armour with a concealing helm similar to Cyber's later visual in the Eighties.

In pre-Crisis continuity, Nu'Bia was kidnapped by Mars, taken to an island concealed within a mystical fog and brainwashed through the use of a magical ring given by the War God, a fact that is mirrored by the possession of Hipolyta by the magical metallic patina.

=== Queen Hippolyta ===
During the War of the Gods storyline, the witch Circe put a spell on Queen Hippolyta and dressed her in the armor of the first Shim'Tar. The Shim'Tar armour was magically placed as a nanotech metallic patina in a goblet. When Queen Hippolyta drank from it, the armour possessed her. Under Circe's spell, Hippolyta and her daughter Diana fought. Not knowing that her own mother was hidden under the armour's mask, Diana fought back, each trying to kill one another. The spell eventually wore off allowing Hippolyta to come to her senses. It was because of this event that Hippolyta developed an initial hatred for the Amazons of Bana-Mighdall as they aided Circe in her plans.

=== Akila and Artemis ===
Eventually a young amazon named Akila assumed the role of the new Shim'Tar. As opposed to the previous Shim'Tars, the title had become adopted by the Bana-Mighdallian Amazons as the station of "protector" within their tribe. Akila proved to be an asset to both the Bana tribe as well as to Wonder Woman and her tribe of Amazons. Akila was specially chosen by Queen Hippolyta to act as the Bana tribe's representative. Hippolyta provided Akila the means to attend the University of Oxford in Man's World in order to further her education. During her schooling she had become an engineer and so, she redesigned her armor using a combination of technology and magic. When the gorilla Queen Abu-Gita and her hordes tried to invade Paradise Island, Akila helped Diana and Artemis defeat their attack.

Due to civil unrest between the two tribes residing on Themyscira, the Themyscirian Amazons and Amazons of Bana-Mighdall declared war upon each other. During this battle the still young Akila was unable to defend either tribe due to her inexperience and blatant uninterest in becoming a warrior. She was hurt during battle and agreed to hand over the title and armor of "Shim'Tar" to Artemis. Artemis acted as her tribe's Shim'Tar until Queen Hippolyta abolished the Amazon's Monarchy rule, after which Artemis set her position as Shim'Tar aside to become the Amazon nation's co-ruler beside the Amazon General Philippus.

In the DC Rebirth, the title of the Shim'Tar reappears and is taken by a new version of Akila, wielder of the Bow of Ra and Artemis' best friend and her former lover.
