= List of feminist comic books =

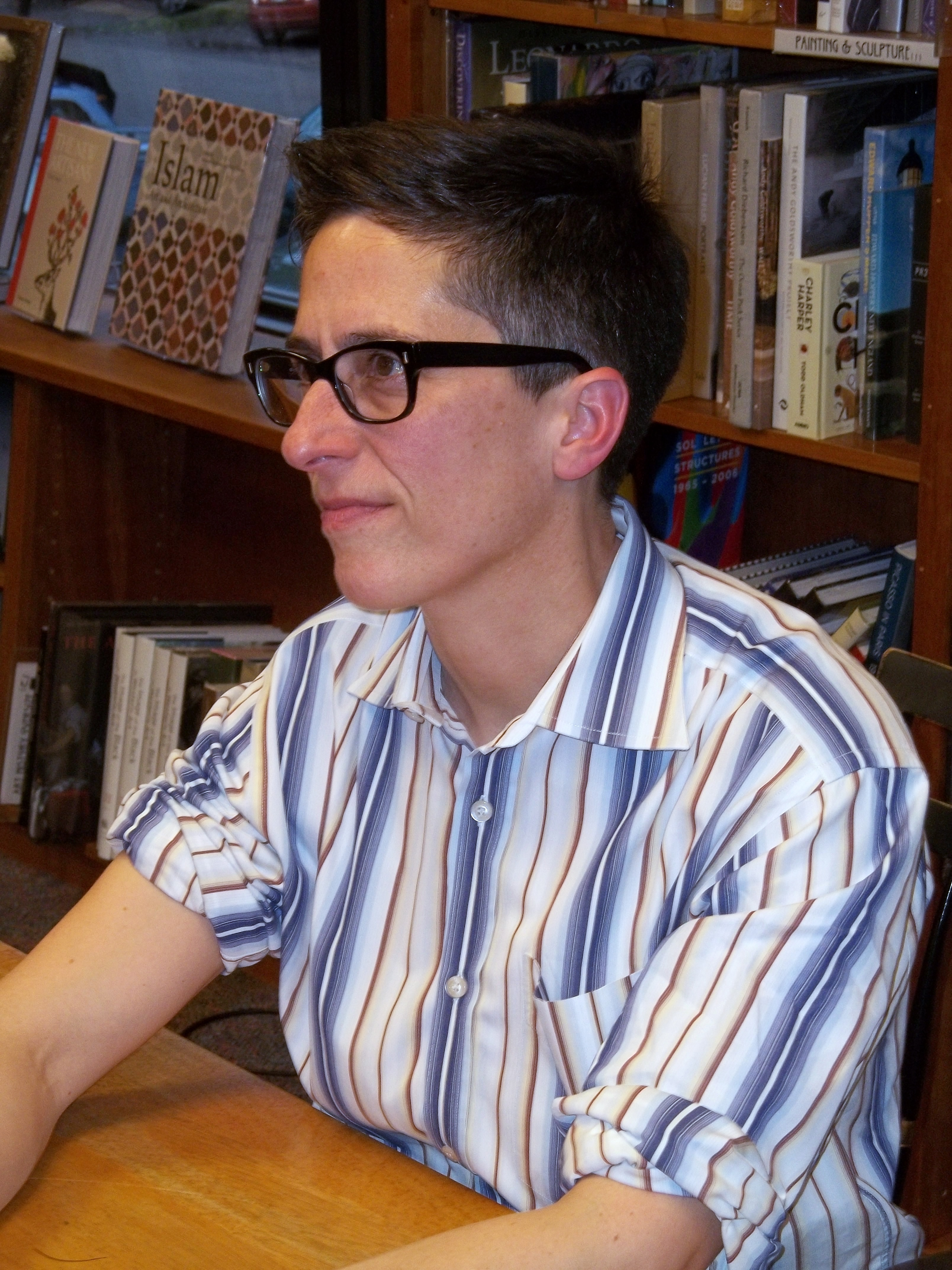
Alison Bechdel, creator of Dykes to Watch Out For, Fun Home and Are You My Mother?

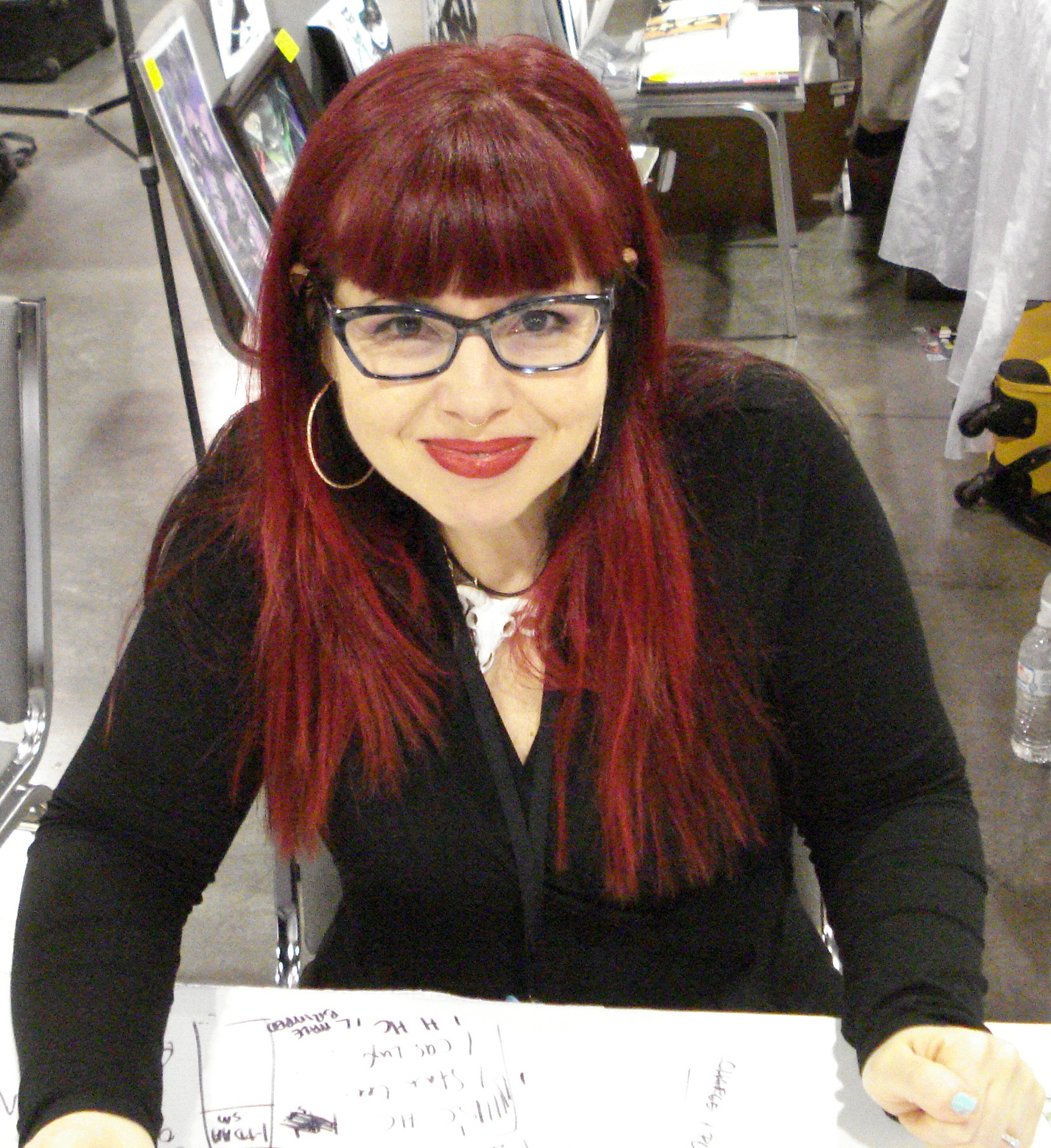
Kelly Sue DeConnick, creator of Bitch Planet, Pretty Deadly, and writer of Captain Marvel

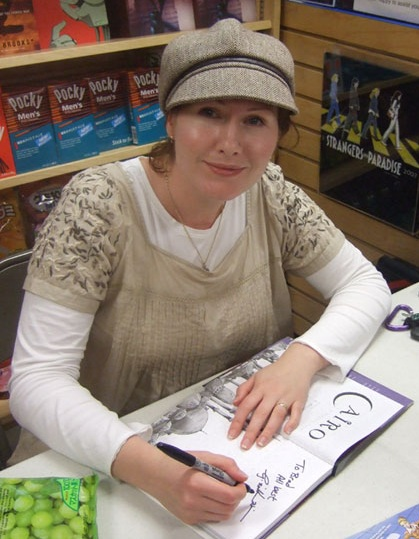
G Willow Wilson, creator of A-Force and Ms. Marvel (Kamala Khan)

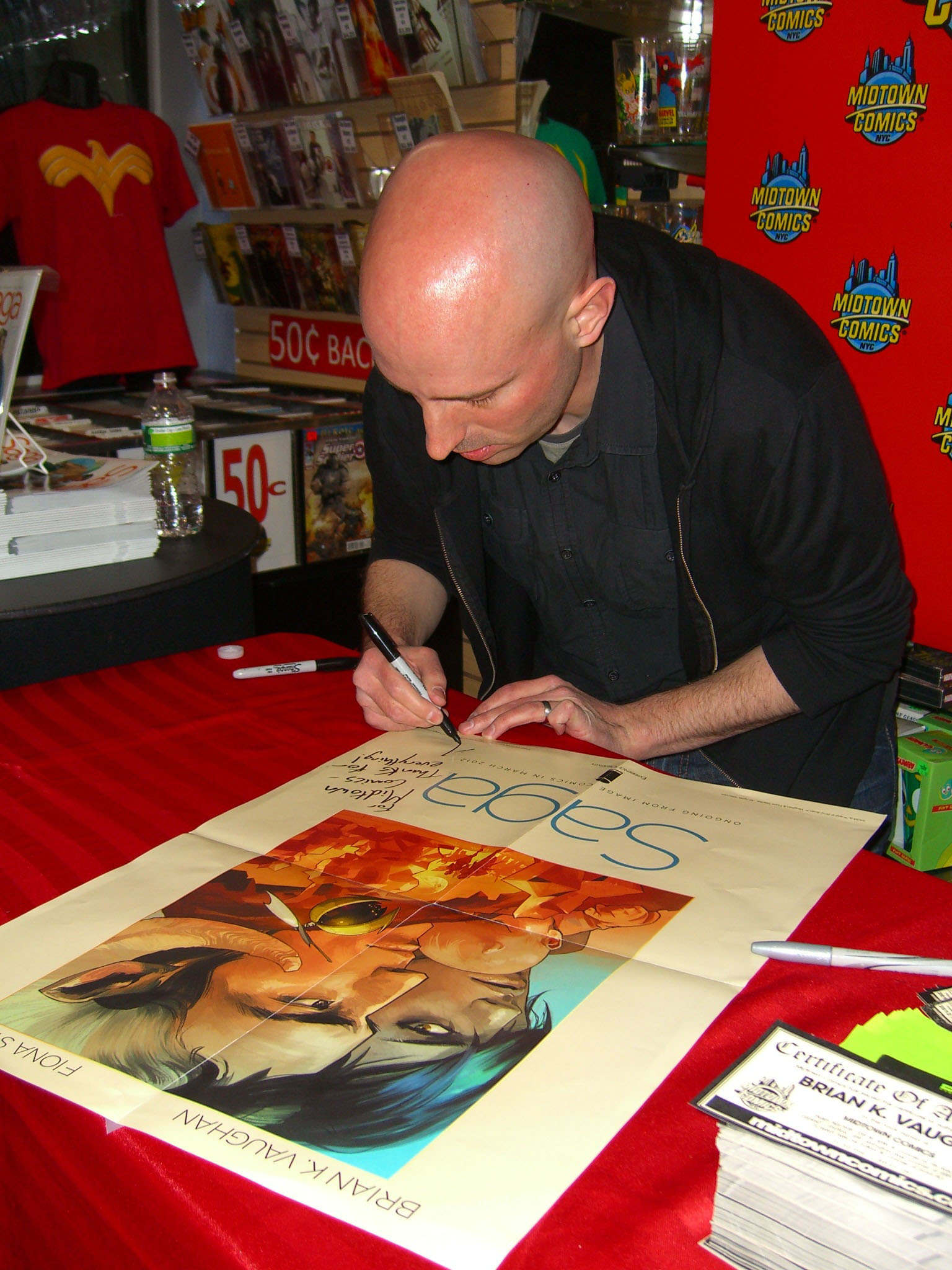
Brian K. Vaughan, creator of Saga and Y:The Last Man

This is a list of feminist comic books and graphic novels.

== A ==
- A-Force by G. Willow Wilson, Marguerite Bennet, and Jorge Molina. A Marvel Comics series about an all-female team of Avengers.
- Anya's Ghost by Vera Brosgol. Graphic novel about a teen Russian immigrant girl who befriends a dangerous ghost.

== B ==
- The Ballad of Halo Jones by Alan Moore and Ian Gibson.
- Batwoman: Elegy by Greg Rucka and J. H. Williams III. DC Comics graphic novel, originally serialized in Detective Comics. A lesbian super-hero faces a murderous super-villainess.
- Bitch Planet by Kelly Sue DeConnick and Valentine De Landro. Image Comics comic book series about a prison planet for "non-compliant" women.
- Black Orchid by Neil Gaiman and Dave McKean
- Blue Sky by Murasaki Yamada. Serial that depicts the economic struggles of a woman after divorce and the societal criticism she must ignore when she later lives with a younger man.
- Buffy the Vampire Slayer

== C ==
- Captain Marvel by Kelly Sue DeConnick and Dexter Soy. The Marvel Comics superhero was renamed from Ms. Marvel, replaced her one-piece swimsuit style uniform with a more practical flight suit, and became the source of her own powers, emphasizing self-sufficiency.
- Castle Waiting, by Linda Medley. Fantagraphics. Medieval fantasy series about a pregnant woman who takes refuge in a castle with fairy tale characters.

== D ==
- Death: The High Cost of Living by Neil Gaiman, Chris Bachalo, and Mark Buckingham. Vertigo Comics miniseries about a female Death taking temporary human form.
- Dirty Plotte by Julie Doucet
- Dykes to Watch Out For by Alison Bechdel

== F ==
- Fun Home by Alison Bechdel, a graphic memoir that discusses growing up as queer woman challenging gender roles.

== G ==
- Gemma Bovery by Posy Simmonds

== H ==
- Hark! A Vagrant by Kate Beaton. Webcomic that frequently parodies sexism in classic literature and pop culture.
- Hothead Paisan by Diane DiMassa. Graphic novel where the titular character, Hothead Paisan, takes revenge on male oppressors.

== I ==
- I Kill Giants by Joe Kelly and artist J. M. Ken Niimura. An anti-social fifth grade girl retreats into a fantasy world where she kills giants with a hammer.
- It Ain't Me, Babe (1970). Contributors included Trina Robbins, Meredith Kurtzman, Barbara Mendez, Michele Brand, Lisa Lyons, Hurricane Nancy Kalish, and the mononymous "Carol"

== J ==
- Jane's World by Paige Braddock.

== L ==
- Lazarus by Greg Rucka and Michael Lark.
- Love and Rockets by Gilbert, Jaime, and Mario Hernandez.
- Lumberjanes by Gus Allen, Grace Ellis, ND Stevenson, and Shannon Watters. Boom! Studios series about five teenage girls adventuring at summer camp.

== M ==
- Man-Eaters by Chelsea Cain, Kate Niemczyk and Lia Miternique at Image Comics. Toxoplasmosis has mutated to turn people who menstruate into dangerous panthers, so now there are hormones in the water to prevent menstruation and tame the population with female genitals. Cats = women, pantherism = feminism and the dystopian society controlling women = the patriarchy.
- The Maxx by Sam Kieth. Image Comics series. A freelance social worker deals with her pain by retreating into a fantastic alternate reality where she is protected by the monstrous titular hero.
- Ms. Marvel (Carol Danvers)
- Ms. Marvel (Kamala Khan) by G. Willow Wilson and Adrian Alphona.

== N ==
- Naughty Bits by Roberta Gregory
- Nemi by Lise Myhre

== O ==
- ODY-C by writer Matt Fraction and artist Christian Ward, published by Image Comics. A genderbent version of Homer's The Odyssey set in outer space, which deconstructs traditionally male-centric stories.
- Oh Joy Sex Toy sex education comics by Erika Moen.
- Ōoku: The Inner Chambers by Fumi Yoshinaga. Manga serialized in Melody magazine, about an alternate history medieval Japan in which an unknown disease kills most of the male population, making a matriarchal society with a harem of men serving the female shōgun.

== P ==
- Paper Girls by Brian K. Vaughan and Cliff Chiang
- La Perdida by Jessica Abel. Pantheon Books series about a young American woman in Mexico.
- Persepolis by Marjane Satrapi. Autobiographical graphic novel about a woman growing up in 1980-1995 Iran.
- Pretty Deadly by Kelly Sue DeConnick and Emma Ríos.
- Princeless by Jeremy Whitley and M. Goodwin Action Lab Comics series. A young black princess rescues herself and her five sisters.
- Priya's Shakti by Ram Devineni, Lina Srivastava, and Dan Goldman.
- Pudge, Girl Blimp

== R ==
- Rat Queens by Kurtis J. Wiebe and various artists. Image Comics series. Four free-spirited female adventurers in a Dungeons & Dragons-inspired fantasy setting.
- Red Sonja by Gail Simone. Dynamite Entertainment comic book series reimagining the fantasy swordswoman.

== S ==
- Sally Heathcote: Suffragette by Mary M. Talbot, Kate Charlesworth and Bryan Talbot.
- Sesame But Different by Chiapoppy.
- Sex Criminals by Matt Fraction and Chip Zdarsky. Image Comics series. A woman can stop time when she has an orgasm.
- Shakmagia (Jewelry Box in English), a feminist Egyptian magazine, collecting political comics stories by different authors.
- She-Hulk. Marvel Comics series about a female lawyer that gains Hulk like powers, that, depending on the writer, varies between a male fantasy, and a witty swashbuckler.
- Shin Kilali by Murasaki Yamada. A semi-autobiographical story in which the protagonist, a mother of two whose marriage of ten years is slowly failing, eventually decides to find a job despite protest from her husband.
- Strong Female Protagonist written by Brennan Lee Mulligan and drawn by Lee Knox Ostertag.
- Suffrajitsu: Mrs. Pankhurst's Amazons by Tony Wolf with art by Joao Vieira. A Jet City Comics trilogy about the adventures of a secret society of martial arts-trained women, known as the "Amazons", who serve as bodyguards and field agents for the leaders of the radical women's suffrage movement in England during early 1914.

== T ==
- Tamara Drewe by Posy Simmonds
- Tank Girl by Jamie Hewlett and Alan Martin.
- This One Summer by Mariko and Jillian Tamaki
- Tits & Clits Comix anthology series edited by Joyce Farmer and Lyn Chevli
- Twisted Sisters by Aline Kominsky-Crumb and Diane Noomin

== U ==
- Umbral by Antony Johnston
- United States of Banana (graphic novel adaptation)

== W ==
- Wimmin's Comix anthology series founded by Trina Robbins that ran from 1972 to 1992.
- Woman World by Aminder Dhaliwal, a science fiction comic about the development of an all-woman civilization after men become extinct as a result of a birth defect.
- Wonder Woman, DC Comics series. Iconic superheroine, originally symbolizing the 1940s liberated woman.

== Y ==
- Y: The Last Man by Brian K. Vaughan and Pia Guerra

== See also ==
- List of award-winning graphic novels
- List of comic books
- List of female comics creators
- List of feminist literature
- List of women's presses
- Portrayal of women in comics
