= Polaqia =

Polaqia (frequently misspelled Polaquia) is a group of comic-book creators born in Galicia (a state in the northwest of Spain) who self-publish their own projects besides working for external publishers. Currently it's a legally constituted cultural association. The group was founded in June 2001, and its anthology Barsowia has won several awards for Best Fanzine in Spain.

== History ==
Founded in June 2001 by writer Kike Benlloch and artists Bernal, Jano, David Rubín and Alberto Vázquez, its editorial debut took place in August of the same year with the 48 page anthology "Mmmh!!", a collection of speechless B/W short stories. In 2002, two individual comic-books were published, the intimist "Patricia" by Jano and the ironic "Alter ego" by Alberto Vázquez. Both artists left Polaqia soon. In 2003 Polaqia launched its twice-a-year anthology "Barsowia". "Barsowia" has reached issue number fourteen by August 2009. Only two founding members are still in the organisation, Bernal and David Rubín, after Kike Benlloch's departure in 2009.

Other artists featured under the seal are Emma Ríos with her 4 issue [sci-fi] miniseries "A prueba de balas" and Álvaro López with three one-shots ("Feliz cumpleaños, May", "A voz na caixa" and "38", the latter co-created with Luís Sendón). Self-published books from Polaqia also include "Corazón de tormentas" by David Rubín and "Tanque Familiar" by Diego Blanco.

== Awards ==
Barsowia won in June 2006 the Readers' Award for Best Fanzine in Spain, 2005, at the Barcelona Convention, Spain's main comic-related event. At the same festival Barsowia won in April 2007 the Official Award for Best Fanzine in Spain, 2006. This award is voted by professionals and critics alike and the highest honor a fanzine can achieve in Spain. The third award to the group was given by the Youth House of Ourense: The Premio Ourense de BD is the main regional award, it acknowledges annually the best comic-related work in Galicia.

== Current lines of work ==
Besides the ongoing Barsowia and self-conclusive comic-books, Polaqia publishes a series of mini art-books ("Polaqia Sketchbook", #1 by Miguel Robledo) and a collection of graphic novels in Spanish ("Rompehielos", the first title is 76-page "Pinche Mundo" by Kike Benlloch and Diego Blanco).

== Languages ==
Polaqia has published books both in Spanish and Galician language, as well as short stories in Portuguese.

== Members ==
As of December 2009 the current Polaqia members (11) are Hugo Covelo, Roque Romero, Brais Rodríguez, Diego Blanco, David Rubín, Sergio Covelo, Bernal Prieto, Álvaro López, Emma Ríos, Luís Sendón, Jose Domingo. Meanwhile, the anthology "Barsowia" has had uncountable contributors including Michael Bonfiglio (USA), Bouss (France), Louis Bertrand Devaud (France), Ken Niimura (Spain), Esteban Hernández (Spain), Susa Monteiro (Portugal), Paulo Monteiro (Portugal).

== Coordinators ==
Kike Benlloch 2001-2006
Hugo Covelo 2006-2008
David Rubín 2008-2009
