= Bitch Planet =

Comic book based on women's lives in prison in a dystopian reality

- Cover art for Bitch Planet #1 by Valentine De Landro

Publication information
- Publisher: Image Comics
- Schedule: Monthly (loosely)
- Format: Ongoing series
- Genre: Feminist Dystopian
- Publication date: December 2014 to April 2017
- No. of issues: 10
- Main character(s): Kamau Kogo (Kam); Penny Rolle; Fanny; Renelle

Creative team
- Written by: Kelly Sue DeConnick
- Artist: Valentine De Landro
- Letterer: Clayton Cowles

Bitch Planet is an American comic book published by Image Comics, created by writer Kelly Sue DeConnick and artist Valentine De Landro. The series is a feminist portrayal of the exploitation film genre and takes place in a dystopian reality, where non-compliant women are sent to an off-planet prison. The original series published 10 issues between December 2014 and April 2017, followed by a five-issue limited series published from June to October 2017.

== Publication history ==
DeConnick and De Landro first met at Fan Expo Canada in Toronto. DeConnick liked De Landro's work (particularly the heavy use of blacks and shades to portray character emotion) after which the two exchanged information and planned to collaborate on a Marvel comic. However, they did not find any opportunities to do so, and decided to create their own comic series instead. De Landro chose Bitch Planet over two other projects DeConnick was also writing. Most of the cover art is done by De Landro, though every third issue contains illustrations by a guest artist.

DeConnick described the book's creation as being "born of a deep and abiding love for exploitation and women in prison movies of the '60s and '70s". Both creators wanted to include the intriguing and difficult aspects of women's lives in prison and to change the narrative of female oppression. DeConnick made a point to include female nudity in the comic in ways to exhibit the female body without the purpose of sexual arousal. The two creators planned to include the backstory of an inmate every third issue before discovering the Netflix series Orange Is the New Black, which has a similar structure. They decided to continue with the idea and forbear watching the TV series in order to avoid its influence.

Each issue of Bitch Planet ended with a segment called "Bitch Fest", containing a letter from DeConnick relating to the comic, politics, and feminist issues. The segment also contains "Bitches Be Like", which is where usually-feminist guest authors write a short passage relating to topics discussed within the issue. In addition, the segment often includes tweets from fans in a subsection titled "Itty Bitty Bitchy," as well as photos and fan art submitted by readers in the subsection "Bitch Face." The back page of every issue includes satirical comic book ads for Missed Connections, and such stereotypical products as X-ray specs, but with a feminist twist.

Following the publication of Bitch Planet #10, a five-issue anthology-style limited series called Bitch Planet: Triple Feature! began, with each issue containing three stories by different writers and artists.

=== Bitch Planet: Triple Feature creative teams ===
Issue	Title	Writer	Artist
1	"Windows"	Cheryl Lynn Eaton	Maria Fröhlich
1	"Without and Within"	Andrew Aydin	Joanna Estep
1	"The Invisible Woman"	Conley Lyons	Craig Yeung (art) / Marco D’Alfonso (colors)
2	"What's Love got To Do With It?"	Jordan Clark	Naomi Franquiz
2	"This Is Good For You"	Danielle Henderson	Ro Stein/Ted Brandt
2	"Bits And Pieces"	Che Grayson	Sharon Lee De La Cruz
3	"Those People"	Alissa Sallah	Alec Valerius
3	"Big Game"	Dylan Meconis	Dylan Meconis
3	"Love, Honor & Obey"	Kit Cox	Vanesa R. Del Ray
4	"Life of a Sportsman"	Marc Deschamps	Mindy Lee
4	"Bodymod"	Sara Woolley	Sara Woolley
4	"To Be Free"	Vita Ayala	Rossi Gifford
5	"Everyone's Grandma Is A Little Bit Feminist"	Matt Fraction	Elsa Charretier
5	"Mirror, Mirror"	Jon Tsuei	Saskia Gutenkist
5	"Basic Bitch"	Bassey Nyambi / Nyambi Nyambi	Chris Visions

Each issue, as with the main series, was lettered by Clayton Cowles.

== Plot ==
The series focuses on women who have been imprisoned for being "non-compliant" in an off-planet prison called the Auxiliary Compliance Outpost. The narrative arc moves through time, presenting how the women were arrested in the first place as well as their various experiences within the prison.

== Reception ==
Reaction to Bitch Planet has been generally positive. Susana Polo at The Mary Sue wrote of the first issue: "Bitch Planet promised space prison, violence, a heck of a lot of ladies of various colors, and a reclamation of the 'women in prison' subgenre of exploitation film for the modern audience. It … delivers". Chris Sims of ComicsAlliance, also reviewing the first issue, claimed that "it's thrilling, it's violent, and it's one of the best first issues of the year". Jeff Lake, writing for IGN, called Bitch Planet #1 "an excellent comic." Caitlin Chappell of CBR also described the comic as focusing on "real world systems that oppress LGBTQ women, women of color and women who don't conform to society," adding that the main protagonists refuse to accept a system which sees their sexualities, "bodies, race and genders as a "threat" to society."

The first trade collection of the series got more mixed reviews from The Guardian, which praised the series as a "refreshing foray into the feminist exploitation genre", while also criticizing it for the use of "lots of ingredients... without much forethought" that led to muddled critiques of religion and politics.

Bitch Planet was given the 2016 British Fantasy Award for Best Comic/Graphic Novel.

== Collected editions ==
Title	Material collected	Published date	ISBN
Bitch Planet Vol. 1: Extraordinary Machine	Bitch Planet #1-5	October 2015	978-1632153661
Bitch Planet Vol. 2: President Bitch	Bitch Planet #6-10	June 2017	978-1632157171
Bitch Planet: Triple Feature	Bitch Planet: Triple Feature #1-5	December 2017	978-1534305298

== See also ==
- List of feminist comic books
- Portrayal of women in comics
