= Yokai Rental Shop =

Japanese manga series

- First tankōbon volume cover

妖飼兄さん (Yōkai Nii-san)
- Genre: Dark fantasy; Supernatural
- Manga
- Written by: Shin Mashiba
- Published by: Square Enix
- English publisher: NA: Seven Seas Entertainment
- Magazine: Monthly GFantasy
- Original run: June 18, 2015 – July 18, 2017
- Volumes: 4

Yokai Rental Shop (Japanese: 妖飼兄さん, Hepburn: Yōkai Nii-san) is a Japanese manga series written and illustrated by Shin Mashiba. It was serialized in Square Enix's shōnen manga magazine Monthly GFantasy from June 2015 to July 2017, with its chapters collected in four tankōbon volumes.

== Publication ==
Written and illustrated by Shin Mashiba, Yokai Rental Shop was serialized in Square Enix's shōnen manga magazine Monthly GFantasy from June 18, 2015, to July 18, 2017. Square Enix collected its chapters in four tankōbon volumes, released from May 27, 2016, to September 27, 2017.

In North America, the manga was licensed for English release by Seven Seas Entertainment.

=== Volumes ===
No.	Original release date	Original ISBN	English release date	English ISBN
1	May 27, 2016	978-4-7575-5001-8	October 24, 2017	978-1-626926-42-4
2	October 27, 2016	978-4-7575-5143-5	January 9, 2018	978-1-626927-36-0
3	February 27, 2017	978-4-7575-5260-9	May 22, 2018	978-1-626927-90-2
4	September 27, 2017	978-4-7575-5490-0	October 30, 2018	978-1-626929-30-2

== See also ==
- Nightmare Inspector: Yumekui Kenbun, another manga series by the same author
