= Kelly Sue DeConnick =

American writer

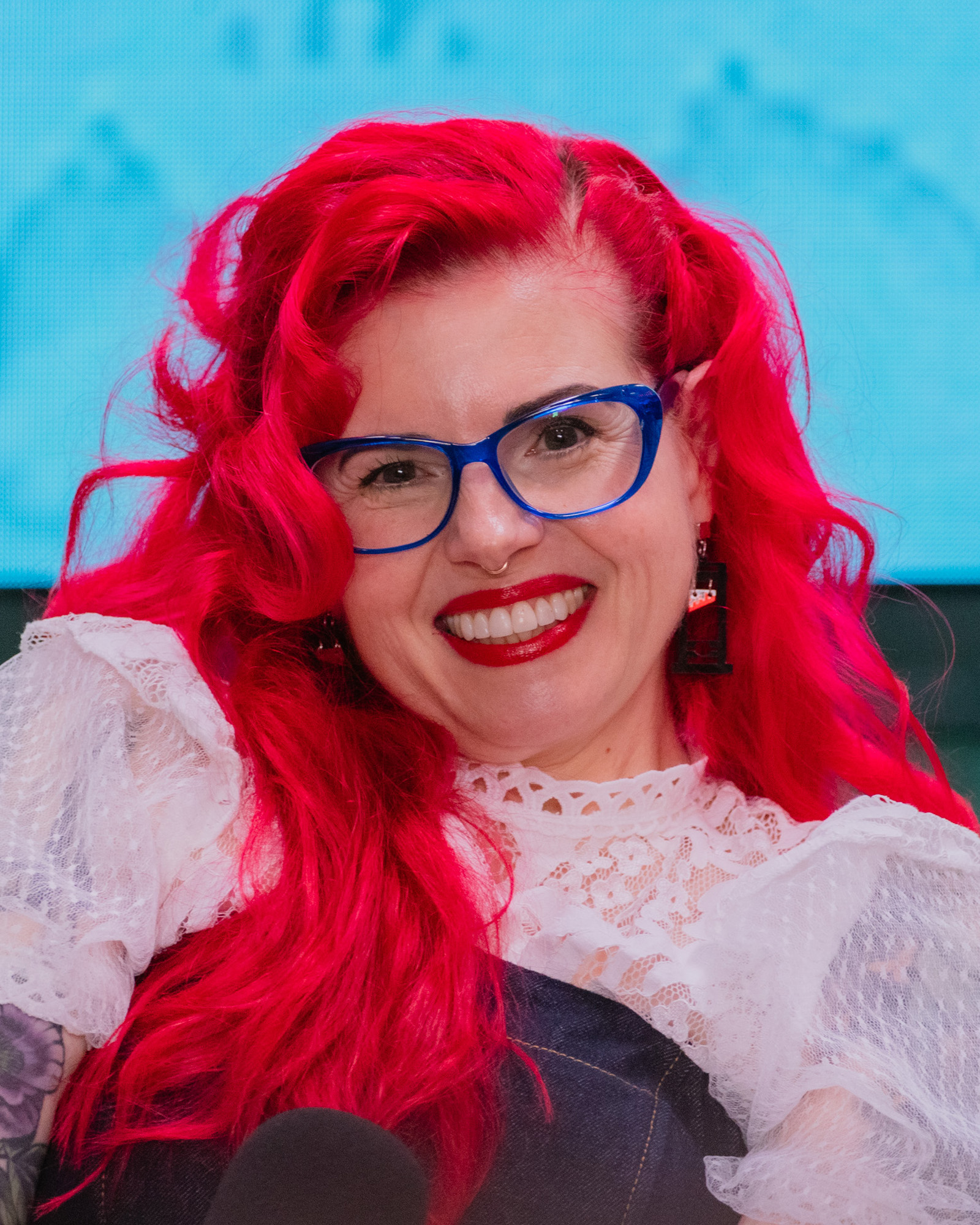
- DeConnick in 2025
- Born: July 15, 1970 (age 56) Columbus, Ohio, U.S.
- Areas: Writer, Editor
- Notable works: Avengers Assemble, Captain Marvel, Pretty Deadly, Bitch Planet Wonder Woman Historia: The Amazons
- Spouse: Matt Fraction

Kelly Sue DeConnick (born July 15, 1970) is an American comic book writer and editor and English-language adapter of manga.

== Career ==
Kelly Sue DeConnick was first introduced to the comics industry by writing copy for photos in adult magazines. She eventually moved on to posting her own stories on a message board for fellow comic book author Warren Ellis. He invited her to work on his new website at the time, artbomb.net, where she wrote catalog entries for comic-book issues. Later in life, she got a job adapting translations of Japanese manga comics for Tokyopop and Viz Media.

To ensure the dialogue she was adapting to English still followed the story arcs, she worked with a translator. DeConnick did this for seven years, and estimates she wrote more than 11,000 comic-book pages. About her work in foreign adaptation she said "... when people say dialogue is the best part of my scripts, it's because I had a lot of practice."

DeConnick's first published comic book story was a five-page text story published in CSI: Crime Scene Investigation – Dominos #5 (Dec. 2004). She wrote the Osborn limited series in 2011 which was drawn by Emma Ríos.

DeConnick and Ríos collaborated again in 2013 to create the Image Comics title Pretty Deadly, a Western story that blends elements of magical realism and horror.

DeConnick began writing DC's Aquaman with issue #43 in December 2018. She was interested in writing the character because he's not as well known as his Justice League counterparts. In a 2018 interview, DeConnick said "Aquaman is [...] considered second-tier. [...] [T]hat makes him an underdog to start with, which is a place I really like to work from." In response to those worried about her changing the character, DeConnick said "I'm writing my Aquaman. I've done my research...Taking an interest in a character is one thing, but crafting your own unique approach is another."

From 2021 to 2022, DeConnick commemorated the 80th anniversary of DC's Wonder Woman by writing a three-issue limited series titled Wonder Woman Historia: The Amazons. Inspired by George Pérez's reworking of Wonder Woman, Wonder Woman Historia: The Amazons takes place before the birth of Diana and tells of the creation of the Amazons and how Hippolyta became their queen. The first issue of Wonder Woman Historia: The Amazons was illustrated by Phil Jimenez, the second by Gene Ha, and the third by Nicola Scott; an omnibus edition of the comics miniseries was released in June 2023.

== Personal life ==
Kelly Sue DeConnick was raised on various military bases because her father was in the United States Air Force. She says that comics were a part of "base culture" and her mother used to buy Wonder Woman comics thinking they were Go Girl books to give to DeConnick as rewards. She earned a drama degree from the University of Texas at Austin.

DeConnick is married to fellow comic book writer Matt Fraction with whom she has two children, Henry and Tallulah.

== Feminism ==
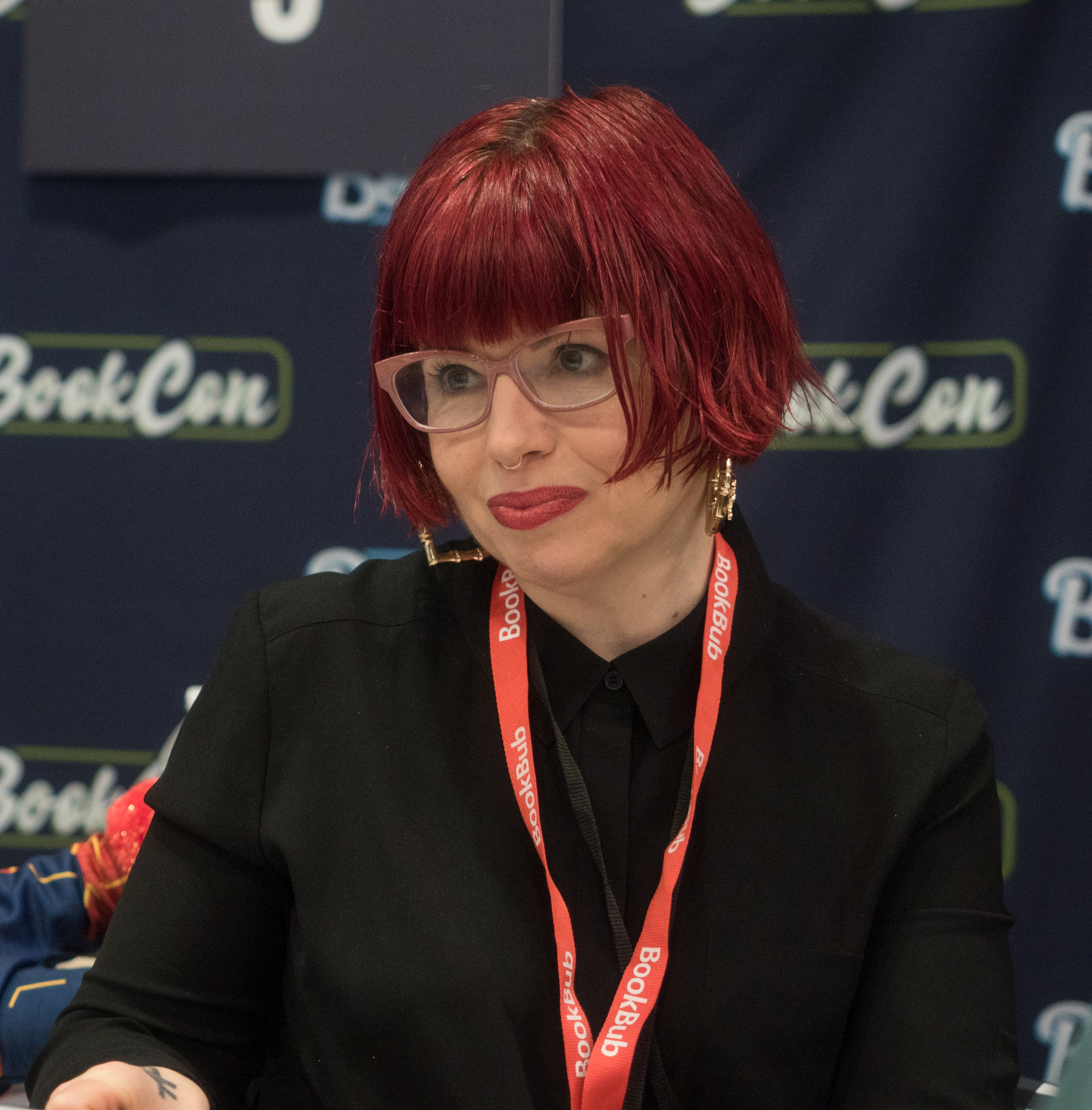
DeConnick at BookCon in June 2019

DeConnick is a self-proclaimed feminist and uses her position in comics to promote feminism and feminist ideas. She started the #VisibleWomen movement on Twitter in March 2016 "to disabuse folks of the notion that women comic artists are rare, to get eyes on said artists & to get them work.".

In another effort to support new artists, DeConnick helped found Creators for Creators, a non-profit organization that provides grants and mentoring to new artists. When asked about handling sexism in the historically male-dominated comic industry, DeConnick advised, "Be terrifying."

DeConnick makes a point to break the "damsel in distress" trope in her work. She received backlash from comic fans for several of the changes made to Carol Danvers comics during her time as a writer for Ms. Marvel and Captain Marvel, which resulted in accusations of being "an angry feminist" and taking "the character and [inserting] her feminist agenda." Regarding the opportunity to write Carol Danvers, DeConnick said, "Pretty much any chance I get to write female characters I'm going to write them because I want to see more of them." She received criticism over her approach of the character before the first issue was even published because of the worry that her feminist beliefs would become more important than good writing of the character. Using her family background in the Air Force, she was able to "add an extra dimension" to Danvers' character development and "gave it a personal angle." During this time, the character's codename and uniform were changed, although DeConnick noted that plans for these changes predated her involvement. With this new Carol Danvers, DeConnick influenced the story foundation for the 2019 Captain Marvel movie.

According to a 2014 study, the fastest growing demographic for comic readers was young adult women, crediting DeConnick's comic Pretty Deadly as one of the titles capturing this growing demographic's attention.

DeConnick also proposed the "Sexy Lamp Test" adjunct to the Bechdel test. In a 2012 interview, she said "If you can replace your female character with a sexy lamp and the story still basically works, maybe you need another draft. They have to be protagonists, not devices." In response to male fans' criticism of Captain Marvel, DeConnick created her series Bitch Planet. She explained, "If you want to see 'angry feminist,' then I will show it to you." Bitch Planet is a dystopian series where "non-compliant" women are sent to a "correction facility" on another planet. DeConnick cites Margaret Atwood's The Handmaid's Tale and RoboCop as influences in the creation of Bitch Planet. In Bitch Planet, women who do not follow the rules of the patriarchy and are put in jail are given “Non-Compliant” tattoos. Many fans of the comic have gotten these same symbols tattooed on their bodies because they connect with the women in the comic. She brought it up in a 99U talk and said "You don't get that tattoo to celebrate something in the book, you get that tattoo because the book celebrates something in you."

In 2012, DeConnick attended Dundrum International Comics Expo as a guest. When an associated Irish comic news site referred to her only in relation to her husband, fans and fellow professionals created a "not the wife of Matt Fraction" meme in response. Following the attention, the website amended their listings. In 2014, Graham Crackers, a Chicago-based comic shop jokingly referred to DeConnick as "Mrs. Matt Fraction" when reviewing her series Bitch Planet, referring to Matt Fraction as "Mr. Kelly Sue DeConnick" in the same set of reviews. Fans accused them of underestimating the complicated history of referring to a woman by her husband's name and demanded she receive proper recognition for her work. The comic shop later issued an apology and revised the names of the couple on the reviews.

At a 2013 convention panel, she stated that "I am willing to make people uncomfortable so that my daughter doesn't have to!" Following up in an interview the following year, she explained "I don't think it's a goal to make other people uncomfortable. It's something I'm willing to do. I do purposefully try to push myself out of my comfort zone. Which is fairly cliché, but one of those clichés that got there for a reason."

About using her full name Kelly Sue DeConnick, she said "I didn't grow up Kelly Sue. I was Kelly. I use Sue and I insist on using Sue so that when someone sees a book with my name on it, they know it was written by a woman. I want a little girl who sees that to know that that's something she can do."

== Awards ==
2026

- Inkpot Award

2022

- Will Eisner Comic Industry Award – Best Single Issue with artist Phil Jimenez for Wonder Woman Historia: The Amazons #1

2018

- Hugo Award nomination for Best Graphic Story – Bitch Planet, Volume 2: President Bitch, illustrated by Taki Soma and Valentine De Landro.
- British Fantasy Awards nomination for Best Comic/Graphic Novel – Bitch Planet, Volume 2: President Bitch.

2016

- British Fantasy Awards win for Best Comic/Graphic Novel – Bitch Planet, Volume 1.

2014

- Eisner Award nomination for Best Writer – Pretty Deadly series, co-created with Emma Ríos.

== Bibliography ==
=== Writer ===
Image Comics

- 24Seven Volume 1 (graphic novel, with other artists, tpb, 225 pages, August 2006, ISBN 1-58240-636-7)
- 24Seven Volume 2 (graphic novel, with other artists, tpb, 240 pages, August 2007, ISBN 1-58240-846-7)
- Comic Book Tattoo Tales Inspired by Tori Amos (graphic novel, with other artists, hc, 480 pages, July 2008, ISBN 1-58240-965-X)
- Pretty Deadly (with Emma Ríos, October 2013–present)
  - Volume 1: The Shrike #1–5 (tpb, 120 pages, 2014, ISBN 1-60706-962-8)
  - Volume 2: The Bear #6–10 (tpb, 152 pages, 2016, ISBN 1-63215-694-6)
  - Volume 3: The Rat #1–5 (tpb, 152 pages, 2020, ISBN 1-53431-519-5)
- Bitch Planet (with Valentine De Landro, December 2014–present)
  - Volume 1: Extraordinary Machine #1–5 (tpb, 136 pages, 2015, ISBN 1-63215-366-1)
  - Volume 2: President Bitch #6-10 (tpb, 144 pages, 2017, ISBN 1-63215-717-9)

IDW Publishing

- 30 Days of Night: Eben & Stella (limited series) (May 2007 – August 2007)
  - 30 Days of Night: Eben & Stella Volume 7 (tpb, 104 pages, 2007, ISBN 1-60010-107-0) collects:
    - "Eben And Stella" (with Steve Niles and Justin Randall, in #1–4, 2007)

Marvel Comics

- Sif, one-shot, "I am the Lady Sif" (with Ryan Stegman, April 2010) collected in Thor: Latverian Prometheus (tpb, 112 pages, 2010, ISBN 0-7851-4372-6)
- Rescue, one-shot, "Rescue Me" (with Andrea Mutti, May 2010)
- Enter the Heroic Age, one-shot, "Coppelia" (with Jamie McKelvie, May 2010)
- Girl Comics vol. 2 No. 3, "Chaos Theory" (with Adriana Melo, July 2010)
- Age of Heroes No. 3, "Girls' Night On" with Brad Walker, July 2010) collected in (tpb, 104 pages, 2011, ISBN 0-78514-724-1)
- Osborn (limited series) (November 2010 – April 2011):
  - Osborn: Evil Incarcerated (tpb, 120 pages, 2011, ISBN 0-78515-175-3) collects:
    - "Osborn" (with Emma Ríos and Becky Cloonan, in #1–5, 2010)
- Captain America and The Secret Avengers, one-shot, "All the Pretty Monsters" (with Greg Tocchini, March 2011)
- Spider-Island: I Love New York City, one-shot, "Spider-Mom" (with Chuck BB, September 2011) collected in Spider-Island Companion (tpb, 360 pages, 2012, ISBN 0-78516-229-1)
- Castle: Richard Castle's Deadly Storm (graphic novel, with Brian Michael Bendis and Lan Medina, hc, 112 pages, September 2011, ISBN 0-7851-5327-6)
- Avenging Spider-Man#9 (1st appearance of Carol Danvers as Captain Marvel) (July 2012 – August 2012):
  - The Good, the Green and the Ugly (tpb, 112 pages, 2012, ISBN 0-78515-780-8) collects:
    - "Wadjetmacallit?!" (written by Kathryn Immonen and drawn by Stuart Immonen, in No. 7, 2012
    - "Untitled" (with Terry Dodson, in #9–10, 2012)
    - "Untitled" (written by Kevin Shinik and drawn by Aaron Kuder, in #12–13, 2012)
- Captain Marvel vol. 7 (July 2012 – November 2013)
  - Volume 1: In Pursuit of Flight (tpb, 136 pages, 2013, ISBN 0-78516-549-5) collects:
    - "Untitled" (with Dexter Soy, Richard Elson, Karl Kesel, Al Barrionuevo, and Emma Ríos, in #1–6, 2012)
  - Volume 2: Down (tpb, 136 pages, 2013, ISBN 0-78516-550-9) collects:
    - "Untitled" (with Christopher Sebela, Dexter Soy and Filipe Andrade, in #7–12, 2012–2013)
  - Avengers: The Enemy Within (tpb, 152 pages, 2013, ISBN 0-78518-403-1) collects:
    - "The Enemy Within" (with Scott Hepburn, Matteo Buffagni, and Gerardo Sandoval, in #13–14, Avengers: The Enemy Within #1, Avengers Assemble vol. 2 #16–17, 2013)
    - "Untitled" (with Filipe Andrade, in #17, 2013)
  - "Kiss Today Goodbye" (with Jen Van Meter and Patrick Oliffe, in #15–16, 2013, collected in Infinity Companion, hc, 688 pages, 2014, ISBN 0-78518-886-X)
- Castle: Richard Castle's Storm Season (graphic novel, with Brian Michael Bendis and Emanuela Lupacchino, hc, 112 pages, October 2012, ISBN 0-7851-6482-0)
- Avengers Assemble (November 2012 – March 2014)
  - Science Bros (tpb, 144 pages, 2013, ISBN 0-78516-797-8) collects:
    - "Untitled" (with Stefano Caselli and Pete Woods, in #9–13, 2012–2013)
    - "Company Man" (written by Christos Gage and drawn by Tomm Coker, Mike Mayhew, Mike Deodato and Luke Ross, in Annual No. 1, 2013)
  - Avengers: The Enemy Within (tpb, 152 pages, 2013, ISBN 0-78518-403-1) collects:
    - "The Enemy Within" (with Scott Hepburn, Matteo Buffagni, and Gerardo Sandoval, in #16–17, Avengers: The Enemy Within #1, Captain Marvel vol. 7 #13–14, 2013)
  - "Infinity" (with Barry Kitson and Jen Van Meter, in #18–19, 2013, collected in Infinity Companion, hc, 688 pages, 2014, ISBN 0-78518-886-X)
  - The Forgeries of Jealousy (tpb, 112 pages, 2014, ISBN 0-78516-798-6) collects:
    - "Untitled" (with Matteo Buffagni, Warren Ellis, Paco Díaz, Neil Edwards, and Raffaele Ienco, in #21–25, 2013–2014)
- Captain Marvel vol. 8 (March 2014 – May 2015)
  - Volume 1: Higher, Further, Faster, More (tpb, 136 pages, 2014, ISBN 0-78519-013-9) collects:
    - "Higher, Further, Faster, More." (with David López, in #1–6, 2014)
  - Volume 2: Stay Fly (tpb, 120 pages, 2015, ISBN 0-7851-9014-7) collects:
    - "Release the Flerken" (with Marcio Takara, in #7–8, 2014)
    - "Lila Cheney's Fantabulous Technicolor Rock Opera" (with David López, in No. 9, 2014)
    - "A Christmas Carol" (with David López, Marcio Takara and Laura Braga, in #10–11, 2014–2015)
  - Volume 3: Alis Volat Propriis (tpb, 96 pages, 2015, ISBN 0-78519-841-5) collects:
    - "The 7 Seconds Before You Die" (with Warren Ellis and David López, in #12–13, 2015)
    - "The Black Vortex: Chapter 11" (with David López, in #14, 2015)
    - "The Next Right Thing" (with David López, in #15, 2015)
- Captain Marvel & the Carol Corps (four-issue limited series with Kelly Thompson, David López, Laura Braga and Paolo Pantalena June–September 2015, collected in Captain Marvel and the Carol Corps, tpb, 120 pages, ISBN 0-78519-865-2, 2015)

BOOM! Studios

- CBGB No. 4 (with Chuck BB, October 2010) collected in CBGB (tpb, 112 pages, 2010, ISBN 1-60886-024-8)

DC Comics

- Supergirl vol. 5 #65–67, "This Is Not My Life" (with ChrisCross, June–August 2011)
- The Witching Hour No. 1, "Legs" (with Ming Doyle, December 2013)
- Adventures of Superman vol. 2 No. 17, "Mystery Box" (with Valentine De Landro, November 2014)
- Aquaman vol. 8 #43–65 (February 2019 – January 2021)
- Detective Comics vol. 1 #1027 (September 2020)
- Wonder Woman Historia: The Amazons – (three-issue limited series with Phil Jimenez, Gene Ha, and Nicola Scott, November 2021 - December 2022)

Dark Horse Comics

- Ghost vol. 3 (September 2012 – March 2013)
  - In the Smoke and Din (tpb, 136 pages, 2013, ISBN 1-6165-5121-6) collects:
    - "Resurrection Mary" (with Phil Noto, in No. 0, 2012)
    - "In the Smoke and Din" (with Phil Noto, in #1–4, 2012–2013)
- Ghost vol. 4 #1–4 (December 2013 – June 2014)
- Prometheus: Fire and Stone – Omega, one-shot (with Agustin Alessio, February 2015) collected in Prometheus: The Complete Fire and Stone (hc, 480 pages, 2015, ISBN 1-6165-5772-9)

=== Editor ===
- Killing Demons (2003) graphic novel

=== Manga adaptations ===
- Black Cat Vol. 1–20
- Blue Spring
- B.O.D.Y. Vol. 1–4
- Demon Diary Vol. 1–7
- Descendants of Darkness Vol. 1–3
- Despotic Lover Vol. 1–4
- Doubt!! Vol. 1–6
- Fruits Basket Vol. 1–3
- Girl Got Game Vol. 1–10
- Kare First Love Vol. 1–10
- MeruPuri Vol. 1–4
- Nightmare Inspector Vol. 1
- Portus
- Ral (Omega) Grad Vol. 1
- Sensual Phrase Vol. 1–18
- Sexy Voice and Robo
- Slam Dunk Vol. 1–16

== Other work ==
DeConnick served as a consultant on the film Captain Marvel. She also makes a cameo appearance as a train passenger who bumps into Carol Danvers.

Preceded by Brian Michael Bendis	Avengers Assemble writer 2013	Succeeded by Al Ewing
