= Shakmagia =

2014 comic book

- Genre: Comic book
- Publisher: Nazra Center for Women's Studies
- Publication date: 2014
- Publication place: Egypt

Shakmagia (Jewelry Box in English) is an Egyptian comic book. The title can be translated as "the Jewelry Box", and is considered a burgeoning example of free expression in Egypt.

== See also ==
- List of feminist comic books
- Portrayal of women in comics
