= Emma Ríos =

Spanish comics artist, writer, and editor

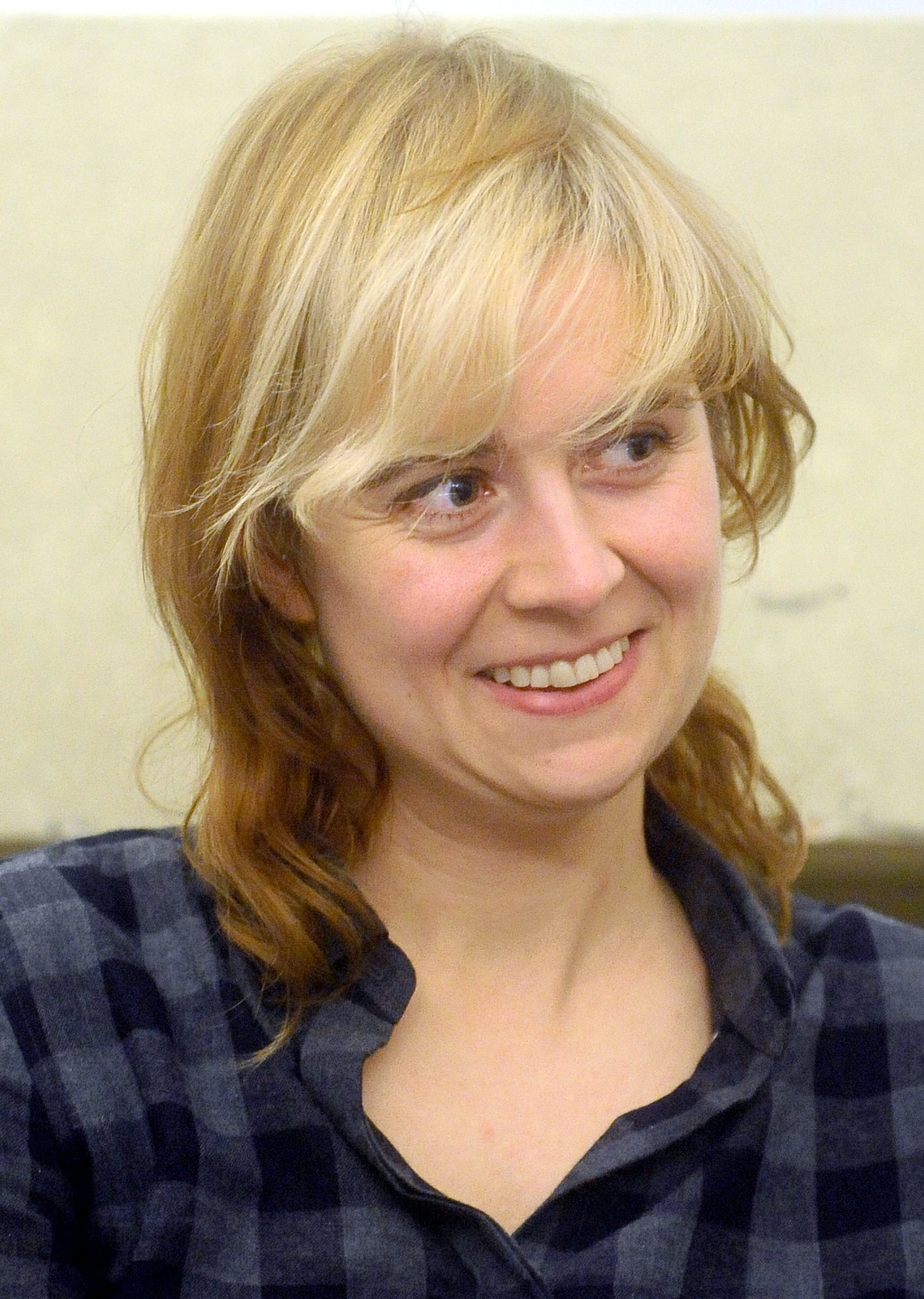
- Emma Ríos at Lucca Comics & Games in 2015
- Born: Emma Ríos Maneiro; April 1, 1976 (age 50) Vilagarcía de Arousa, Galicia, Spain
- Areas: Comic Book Artist, Illustrator
- Notable works: Pretty Deadly, Osborn, Strange, I.D., and Mirror

Emma Ríos Maneiro (born April 1, 1976, Vilagarcía de Arousa) is a Spanish comics artist, writer, and editor with an international presence in the comics industry. She has worked for some of the largest American comics publishers, including Marvel, Image, and Boom! Studios.

She has several ongoing titles: Mirror with Malaysian artist Hwei Lim and Pretty Deadly with American writer Kelly Sue Deconnick. The latter earned Ríos Eisner award nominations for Best Penciller/Inker/Artist and Best Cover Artist in 2014 and a win for Best Cover Artist in 2020. She is also a rapier fencer specializing in La Verdadera Destreza.

== Early life ==
Ríos began drawing as a child and is a self-taught artist. As a young adult, Ríos attended University of A Coruña for architecture and afterwards worked as an architect for a few years while publishing comics on the side in fanzines. In 2008, she refocused her career on comics.

== Career ==
In the same year Ríos resigned from architecture, she participated in Lingua Comica, a transnational comics workshop program funded by the Asia-Europe Foundation (ASEF). Ríos has related in interviews that she did not feel like a real comics artist until she was selected for the program alongside Hwei Lim, with whom she currently co-creates Mirror. Shortly afterwards, she began to work for several comics publishers in the United States.

Prior to resigning from architecture, Ríos began her career in comics by self-publishing zines in her teenage years. Over time, Ríos was a regular contributor to the Galicia, Spain-based small press and fanzine Polaquia. Here, Ríos published multiple original works including APB (A Prueba de Balas, Bulletproof) and other comics.

Ríos debuted in American comics in 2008 with Hexed, a fantasy/horror title under Boom! Studios she illustrated for Michael Nelson.

Ríos first joined Marvel comics as an illustrator for Doctor Strange written by Mark Waid. Ríos accredits Waid for pushing her to pursue a career in Marvel comics, where she has worked on many titles including The Amazing Spider-man, Runaways, Girl Comics, and Osborn, a mini-series about the Spider-man villain Norman Osborn. Ríos partnered with Kelly Sue Deconnick for Osborn, whom she worked on several other projects with across multiple publishers.

Ríos and Deconnick joined forces for Pretty Deadly, an award-winning and ongoing western/fantasy series published by Image Comics. Deconnick and Ríos collaborated previously at Image for “Railbirds”, a graphic reflection and tribute written by Deconnick for her friend, the late slam-poet Maggie Estep a year after her death. This appeared in Island magazine, a monthly comics anthology published from 2015 to 2017, which Ríos co-edited and contributed to with Brandon Graham. Although the magazine has since ended, Ríos has spoken favorably of her work with the magazine. Her own solo story in Island, I.D, was also released as a solo graphic novel.

Ríos created the poster for the American television series Agents of S.H.I.E.L.D.'s episode "Ragtag".

== Bibliography ==
- Hexed #1-4 (a, Boom Studios, 2008-09)
- Runaways Vol. 3 #10 (a, Marvel Comics, 2009)
- Strange Vol. 2 #1-4 (a, Marvel Comics, 2009-10)
- Girl Comics Vol. 2 #1 (a, Marvel Comics, 2010)
- Irredeemable Special (a, Boom Studios, 2010)
- Firestar #1 (a, Marvel Comics, 2010)
- Amazing Spider-Man #631-33, 636, 662-63, 667, 700.3 (a, Marvel Comics, 2010-14)
- Heralds #4 (a, Marvel Comics, 2010)
- Shadowland: Elektra #1 (a, Marvel Comics, 2010)
- Osborn #1-5 (a, Marvel Comics, 2010-11)
- Spider-Island: Cloak & Dagger #1-3 (a, Marvel Comics, 2011)
- Amazing Spider-Man: Infested #1 (a, Marvel Comics, 2011)
- Prophet #26 backup (a, Image Comics, 2012)
- Doctor Strange: Season One Graphic Novel (a, Marvel Comics, 2012)
- Captain Marvel Vol. 7 #5-6 (a, Marvel Comics, 2012)
- Pretty Deadly #1-10 (a, Image Comics, 2013-16)
- Mirror #1-10 (w/a with Hwei Lim, Image Comics, 2016-19)
- I.D. Graphic Novel (w/a, Image Comics, 2016)
- Pretty Deadly: The Rat #1-5 (a, Image Comics, 2019-20)
- Legend of the Swamp Thing Halloween Spectacular One-Shot (a, DC Comics, 2020)
- Batman Black and White Vol. 5 #1 (w/a, DC Comics, 2020)
- Gotham City Villains Anniversary Giant One-Shot (a, DC Comics, 2021)
- Anzuelo Graphic Novel (w/a, Image Comics, 2024)
