= Pretty Deadly =

American comic book series

- Cover of Pretty Deadly #1

Publication information
- Publisher: Image Comics
- Schedule: Monthly
- Format: Ongoing (2013–2016); Series of miniseries (2019–present)
- Genre: Phantasmagoria, mythology
- Publication date: October 2013
- No. of issues: 15
- Main character: Death-Face Ginny

Creative team
- Created by: Kelly Sue DeConnick; Emma Ríos
- Written by: Kelly Sue DeConnick
- Artist: Emma Ríos
- Letterer: Clayton Cowles
- Colorist: Jordie Bellaire

Pretty Deadly is a creator-owned American comic book series by Kelly Sue DeConnick and Spanish artist Emma Ríos, distributed by Image Comics. The story combines elements from western and horror genres, and draws on aspects from mythology and folklore. Pretty Deadly is Deconnick and Ríos' third collaboration, their first being Osborn in 2011 and their second being issues #5 & 6 of the 2012 Captain Marvel series. The initial print run for issue one of 57,000 copies sold out.

The Pretty Deadly creative team was nominated for several Eisner Awards in 2014: DeConnick for Best Writer, Ríos for Best Penciller/Inker and Best Cover Artist, and Jordie Bellaire for Best Coloring. In 2020, Ríos won the Eisner Award for Best Cover Artist for her work on Volume 3: The Rat.

== Collected editions ==
Title	Material collected	Publication date	ISBN
Pretty Deadly – Volume 1: The Shrike	Pretty Deadly #1–5	April 30, 2014	9781607069621
Pretty Deadly – Volume 2: The Bear	Pretty Deadly #6–10	August 24, 2016	9781632156945
Pretty Deadly – Volume 3: The Rat	Pretty Deadly: The Rat #1–5	March, 2020	9781632156945
