= Carol Danvers =

Marvel Comics fictional character

- Various looks of Carol Danvers. Clockwise from left: Ms. Marvel (original costume), Captain Marvel, Ms. Marvel (black costume), and Binary. Art by Alex Ross.

Publication information
- Publisher: Marvel Comics
- First appearance: As Carol Danvers: Marvel Super-Heroes #13; (March 1968); As Ms. Marvel: Ms. Marvel #1; (January 1977); As Binary: The Uncanny X-Men #164; (December 1982); As Warbird: The Avengers (vol. 3) #4; (May 1998); As Captain Marvel: Avenging Spider-Man #9; (July 2012)
- Created by: Roy Thomas (writer); Gene Colan (artist)

In-story information
- Full name: Carol Susan Jane Danvers (Human name); Car-Ell (Kree name)
- Species: Human mutate (Note: In Marvel comics, the term "mutate" is used as a noun to designate characters that received superpowers from an external source, as opposed to Marvel's mutants.) / Kree hybrid
- Team affiliations: Avengers; Alpha Flight Space Program; Guardians of the Galaxy; United States Air Force; Mighty Avengers; New Avengers; Infinity Watch; Starjammers; S.H.I.E.L.D.; Ultimates; A-Force; X-Men; NASA
- Partnerships: Spider-Woman; Jessica Jones; Araña
- Notable aliases: Captain Danvers; Colonel Danvers; Captain Marvel; Major Danvers; Lady Marvel; Ms. Marvel; Warbird; Binary
- Abilities: Superhuman strength, speed, durability, agility, stamina, longevity and reflexes; Energy manipulation, absorption, and projection; "Seventh sense" granting flash precognition; Accelerated healing factor; Flight; Skilled armed and unarmed combatant; As Binary: Ability to travel at the speed of light; Radiation generation; Energy manipulation; Gravity manipulation; Flight/space flight; Heat generation; Light generation

Carol Susan Jane Danvers is a character appearing in American comic books published by Marvel Comics. Created by writer Roy Thomas and artist Gene Colan, the character first appeared as an officer in the United States Air Force and a colleague of the Kree superhero Mar-Vell in Marvel Super-Heroes #13 (March 1968). Danvers later became the first incarnation of Ms. Marvel in Ms. Marvel #1 (cover-dated January 1977) after her DNA was fused with Mar-Vell's during an explosion, giving her superhuman powers. Debuting in the Silver Age of comics, the character was featured in a self-titled series in the late 1970s before becoming associated with the superhero teams the Avengers and the X-Men. The character has also been known as Binary, Warbird, and Captain Marvel at various points in her history.

Carol Danvers has been described as one of Marvel's most notable and powerful female heroes, being labelled as a symbol of female empowerment. Since her original introduction in comics, the character has been featured in various other Marvel-licensed products, including video games, animated television series, and merchandise such as trading cards. Brie Larson portrays Carol Danvers in the live-action Marvel Cinematic Universe films Captain Marvel, Avengers: Endgame (both 2019), Shang-Chi and the Legend of the Ten Rings (2021), and The Marvels (2023). Mckenna Grace portrayed a young Danvers in Captain Marvel. Alexandra Daniels voices alternate reality versions of the character in the Disney+ animated series What If...? (2021).

== Development ==
In an interview, Gerry Conway recalled the reason why Danvers was turned into a super hero, "It actually came about for fairly uncreative reasons... there was this idea, that I was kicking people off books in order to take over writing their books, this was of course not the case, at least from my point of view but given that how was they felt, I said to Stan," "well is there any way that we could create some stuff so I'm not kicking people off books?" Stan had either just created She-Hulk or was thinking about creating her," and we thought, 'can we come up with another female super hero, that can use the Marvel name?'"

== Publication history ==
=== 1960s ===
The character debuted in Marvel Super-Heroes #13 (March 1968) by writer Roy Thomas and artist Gene Colan. In the story, she is an officer in the United States Air Force and Security Chief of a restricted military base, where Danvers meets Dr. Walter Lawson, the human alias of alien Kree hero Captain Marvel. In a later story, Danvers is caught in the explosion of a Kree device after trying to get close to Captain Marvel. Although Captain Marvel manages to save her life, Danvers sustains serious injuries.

=== 1970s ===
Danvers resurfaces with superhuman abilities and becomes the hero Ms. Marvel (created by writer Gerry Conway and artist John Buscema) in a self-titled series in January 1977, at first written by Gerry Conway and later by Chris Claremont. In the series, she is the editor of Women Magazine, a spin-off of the Daily Bugle. It is revealed that the energy exposure from the explosion of a device called the "Psyche-Magnetron" caused Danvers's genetic structure to meld with Captain Marvel's, effectively turning her into a human-Kree hybrid. Ms. Marvel had a series of semi-regular appearances in The Avengers, with additional appearances with the Defenders, Spider-Man, the Thing, and Iron Man.

At the time of the publication of Ms. Marvel #1 in 1977, the title was self-consciously socially progressive for its time. This was reflected in the use of the word "Ms.," at the time associated with the feminist movement, and in Danvers fighting for equal pay for equal work in her civilian identity.

=== 1980s ===
In The Avengers #200 (October 1980), which was written by Bob Layton, David Michelinie, George Pérez, and Jim Shooter, Ms. Marvel is kidnapped by a character named Marcus (the apparent son of Avengers foe Immortus) and taken to an alternate dimension, where she is raped by Marcus and impregnated. She gives birth on Earth to a child that rapidly ages into another version of Marcus, who is ultimately unable to remain on Earth after Hawkeye mistakenly damages his machine and takes Ms. Marvel back to the alternate dimension with no opposition from the Avengers, who perceive Ms. Marvel and Marcus to have fallen in love. Comic book historian Carol A. Strickland criticized the storyline in an essay, "The Rape of Ms. Marvel," due to the storyline implying Marcus to have potentially brainwashed Danvers into falling in love with him. Citing Marcus' line, "Finally, after relative weeks of such efforts—and admittedly, with a subtle boost from Immortus' machines—you became mine", Strickland posited that this constituted rape. As a former writer of the solo title, Chris Claremont also commented on the inappropriateness of the storyline, having been disallowed from having the character have a normal child and be a single mother.

Claremont wrote a follow-up to the Marcus story in The Avengers Annual #10 (1981). In that story, Danvers is revealed to have returned to Earth—courtesy of Immortus's technology after Marcus continued to age and die of old age—but is attacked by the mutant Rogue, who permanently absorbs Danvers' abilities and memories. Danvers' memories are restored by Professor X, and an angry confrontation with the Avengers concerning their failure to realize Marcus had brainwashed her follows.

Claremont continued to develop the character in the title The Uncanny X-Men. Danvers enters the Pentagon and, while wiping the government's files on the X-Men, also deletes all records of herself in a symbolic break with her life as Ms. Marvel. During an adventure in space with the X-Men, Danvers is experimented on by the alien Brood and becomes Binary. Drawing on the power of a cosmic phenomenon called a white hole, Danvers becomes capable of generating the power of a star.

The remnants of Danvers's absorbed powers and mind manifest within Rogue, sometimes overpowering Rogue's personality. After Rogue passes through the Siege Perilous, the Ms. Marvel persona is separated from her as an independent entity. Soon afterward, the Ms. Marvel persona is killed by Magneto.

=== 1990s ===
Carol Danvers continued to make sporadic appearances, including being featured in the two issue mini-series X-Men Spotlight On... Starjammers Two issues of the original Ms. Marvel title, which were initially not published due to the original series' cancellation, were printed in a quarterly anthology series. That same year, Danvers appeared extensively in the storyline "Operation Galactic Storm". Near the conclusion of the story, Danvers loses her connection to the white hole she drew her powers from while diverting anti-matter from the Earth's sun left by the passing Nega-Bomb, reverting to her original Ms. Marvel powers. She retains the energy manipulation and absorption powers she had as Binary, but on a smaller scale.

After several more team and solo appearances, Danvers rejoins the Avengers with the new alias Warbird (created by writer Kurt Busiek and artist George Pérez). Busiek explored the character by having her develop alcoholism, struggling to come to terms with the loss of her cosmic powers and memories. Following the "Live Kree or Die" storyline, Danvers is suspended from active duty.

=== 2000s ===
As Warbird, the character returns to the Avengers and plays a key role in the "Kang Dynasty" plotline. Kang the Conqueror's son Marcus, the Scarlet Centurion, falls in love with her, but she rejects him, in part because he reminds her of Marcus, son of Kang's older alter ego Immortus, who raped her. The Scarlet Centurion nonetheless helps her to defeat the Master of the World, a supervillain whose alien technology becomes the key to defeating Kang. In the course of the fight, Warbird kills the Master, and after the final victory over Kang she demands a court martial to review her actions. The court martial finds her killing justified as an act of war, and Danvers continues as an Avenger. After the Avengers disband, Warbird leaves the group.

The character was then featured as "Captain Marvel" in a false reality created by the mutant Scarlet Witch in the 2005 miniseries House of M. In this reality, Danvers' had glimpsed at her potential, becoming its greatest hero. After seeing how great of a hero she can really be, she decided to fulfill her potential in the main Marvel universe. Together with fellow Avenger Iron Man, Danvers also becomes a principal advocate of the Superhuman Registration Act during the events of the 2006–07 "Civil War" storyline. The story also continues in Ms. Marvel's own title as she battles a group of anti-registration heroes led by Captain America.

The storyline has major consequences for the New Avengers, which debuts in the 2007 series The Mighty Avengers, with Danvers as a member. Danvers enters into a relationship with fellow member Wonder Man, and becomes leader of the Mighty Avengers. Danvers makes an agreement with Tony Stark, director of S.H.I.E.L.D., to lead a covert strike team called Operation: Lightning Storm, its designated mission being the elimination of supervillains before they become global threats.

Ms. Marvel also plays a significant role in the 2008 storyline "Secret Invasion", in which the alien Skrulls are revealed to have secretly infiltrated Earth by impersonating humans. She befriends Captain Marvel's Skrull impostor and proves to him that she is not a Skrull by revealing intimate details about their life together. At the conclusion of the war with the Skrulls, Norman Osborn is placed in charge of the Avengers. Refusing to serve under Osborn, Ms. Marvel flees Avengers Tower, and joins the New Avengers, becoming second-in-command. Osborn appoints former Thunderbolt member Moonstone (Karla Sofen) as the "new" Ms. Marvel to his Dark Avengers team; Moonstone wears a variation of Ms. Marvel's original costume. Osborn engineers a battle that results in Danvers's powers overloading, causing her apparent death. Moonstone takes over the title role in the ongoing Ms. Marvel series. Danvers returns with the aid of the New Avengers and reclaims the title of Ms. Marvel from Karla Sofen.

The increased use of Carol Danvers as a prominent character in many story arcs throughout this decade eventually prompted one commentator to note that "she's now the House of Ideas' premier heroine".

=== 2010s ===
In the conclusion of the second volume of Ms. Marvel, Carol Danvers battles her old nemesis Mystique and a clone of Captain Marvel created by the Skrulls during the Secret Invasion, after they carry out a series of tragedies at temples belonging to the Church of Hala, a church dedicated to Mar-Vell. Danvers later aids the allied forces of Steve Rogers against Iron Patriot during the Siege of Asgard. Danvers also begins to develop a friendship with Spider-Man. Though he infuriates her the first time they work together, the two become closer when he helps her during the "Dark Reign" storyline, and she later admits to having feelings for him. Following the conclusion of the "Siege" storyline, Ms. Marvel returns as a regular character in the second volume of The New Avengers.

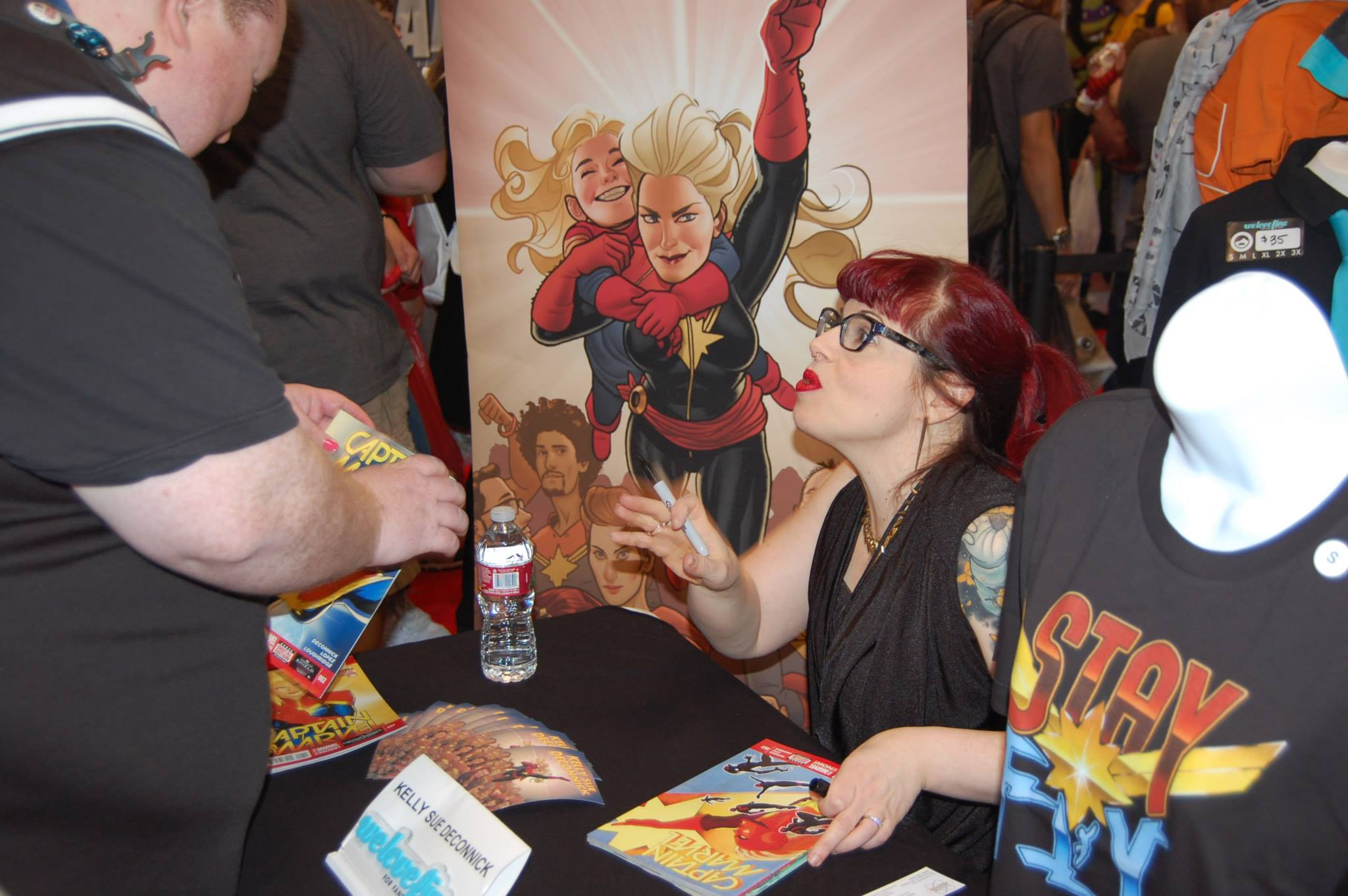
Writer Kelly Sue DeConnick signing copies of Captain Marvel at the 2014 New York Comic Con

In July 2012, Danvers assumed the mantle of Captain Marvel in an ongoing series written by Kelly Sue DeConnick with art by Dexter Soy. For the title, artist Jamie McKelvie redesigned Danvers' costume, giving her a jumpsuit that used her traditional colours and her sash, but also paid homage to her military roots. McKelvie was DeConnick's first choice but originally completed the redesign as a bet with DeConnick. In the series, Danvers explores her past. When describing her pitch for the series, DeConnick said at WonderCon 2012 that it could be "pretty much be summed up with 'Carol Danvers as Chuck Yeager.'" She said the series would contemplate what Captain Marvel's legend means to Danvers, how she will wield it, and how the rest of the Marvel Universe reacts.

Danvers also rejoined the main Avengers team as Captain Marvel in volume 5 of The Avengers and in the spin-off series, Avengers Assemble, also written by DeConnick. Editor Lauren Sankovitch said that Marvel editors liked DeConnick's work and that adding her to the team would "get some lady power in the Avengers lineup". DeConnick said, "You might know this — I have a certain affection for [Carol Danvers]. And I decided, 'Well, if I'm deciding, there will be a slot available for her as well.'"

In 2013, Danvers starred in the Captain Marvel / Avengers Assemble crossover storyline, "The Enemy Within". In the story, Danvers and her Avenger teammates battle Yon-Rogg, the Kree commander who was responsible for the explosion that caused Danvers to receive her powers, and in defeating the Kree Danvers loses her memories. In November 2013, Marvel announced that Danvers would be joining the Guardians of the Galaxy beginning in Free Comic Book Day: Guardians of the Galaxy (May 2014) by Brian Michael Bendis and Sara Pichelli. In March 2014, Marvel launched an eighth volume of Captain Marvel written again by DeConnick and starring Danvers in the title role but drawn by artist David López. DeConnick said, "The big difference is we were grounded in New York City for the previous volume; at least in the latter part of it. With the new Captain Marvel #1 we start in NYC but after that we're letting her go cosmic. Carol will be spending time off planet." DeConnick initially planned to end Captain Marvel in six issues. However, the success of the comic book series led her to work on more issues.

During the 2015 "Secret Wars" storyline, Danvers headlined her own tie-in series, Captain Marvel and the Carol Corps co-written by DeConnick and Kelly Thompson and drawn by López. In the series, Danvers leads an elite squadron of female fighter pilots stationed at an airbase, Hala Field, where she is the only superpowered being; this leads the corps to help Danvers answer questions about her origin, which puts her in conflict with the controlling forces of Battleworld. During the storyline, Danvers becomes a member of A-Force, Battleworld's all-female team of Avengers. The series, written by G. Willow Wilson, continued into Marvel's "All-New, All-Different Marvel" relaunch campaign that followed "Secret Wars", with Danvers in a key role.

Continuing with the All-New, All-Different Marvel initiative, Danvers starred in the ninth volume of Captain Marvel, written by Agent Carter showrunners Tara Butters and Michele Fazekas, with artwork by Kris Anka, which debuted in October 2015. The series, set eight months after "Secret Wars", sees Danvers taking over the responsibilities of S.W.O.R.D., a military agency that was previously designated to protect Earth from intergalactic threats. Editor Sana Amanat said, "This is really meant to be the next level for Captain Marvel. Carol is really meant to be a soldier and a commander, and also a diplomat. We're really trying to build up this space complex and this space world." At this time, Danvers also joined The Ultimates. Series writer Al Ewing said, "Carol's currently running Alpha Flight, which is Earth's premier space agency. [She has] seen the highs and the lows of the superhero business, and come out the other side. Right now, Carol's in the ascendant, culturally, both in-universe and outside it... Carol's story in The Ultimates is very much about her links with the ordinary super-hero world, and about trying to form a bridge between that world and the world of The Ultimates."

In 2016, Danvers played a predominant role in the storyline "Civil War II", the core miniseries of which was written by Brian Michael Bendis and illustrated by David Marquez. In the story, Danvers is the leader of a faction of superheroes who wish to use the precognitive power of the Inhuman Ulysses Cain to profile people who in his visions, will commit future crimes. About her position Bendis stated, "From Carol's point of view, she is like, 'You're telling me the world is still turning at the end of the day and everyone is safe? I don't care... If it keeps us safe, that's fine.'" During the storyline, Danvers headed an effort to systematically lock up citizens without a trial for crimes they had not yet committed, and might never do. This has been criticised as bad writing that did not fit with Danvers's personality, and nearly destroyed her as a character.

Following the conclusion of "Civil War II", Danvers starred in The Mighty Captain Marvel, by writer Margaret Stohl and artist Ramon Rosanas, which sees Danvers become a household name. Stohl explained, "She will be one of the most popular heroes on the planet—but that's not something she is very comfortable with. And of course she's lost a lot of folks that she's loved so she has to cope with that, too. That being said, she still has a job to do as commander of the Alpha Flight. Her latest mission being recruiting and training new cadets. It'll also bring with it a mysterious danger that will threaten everything Carol has built."

Beginning in July 2018, Danvers headlined a limited series, The Life of Captain Marvel, by Stohl and artist Carlos Pacheco. The series is described as a "retelling" of Danvers' origin story, but Stohl insisted that it is not a "reinvention" explaining, "You look through a different lens. It's nothing you'll expect and nothing you've seen happen, but there will be parts of her life that change the context of what you've seen before, so it's telling the other side of the story, of how she came to be." Stohl also said that there would be similarities with the 2019 film, but the film is "its own thing". The series reveals that Danvers' mother is Kree and that the Psyche-Magnetron activated her innate Kree genes.

In early 2019 Danvers starred in the tenth volume of Captain Marvel written by Kelly Thompson and drawn by Carmen Carnero. The story sees Danvers return to New York City after a stint in space and reconnect with allies and friends like Iron Man and Spider-Woman, as well as explore new relationships. Thompson teased, "There will definitely be some romance and it may be someone we all know and have seen before in Marvel Comics."

=== 2020s ===
Danvers plays a major role in the 2020 "Empyre" crossover storyline written by Al Ewing and Dan Slott, in which Danvers is elected as the Supreme Accuser of the newly forged Kree/Skrull alliance under Hulkling and leads her own corps of Accusers that includes Spider-Woman, Hazmat and War Machine. During an investigation, Danvers discovers that she has a half-sister named Lauri-Ell, who was genetically engineered using her mother's DNA.

== Characterization ==
With Ms. Marvel #1 in 1977, writer Gerry Conway played a significant role in the character's development, writing in his introduction to the series, "you might see a parallel between her quest for identity, and the modern woman's quest for raised consciousness, for self-liberation, for identity".

Ms. Marvel's uniform and abilities, however, were derived from the character's then-contemporary male counterpart: Captain Marvel. The Ms. Marvel letters page ("Ms. Prints") featured letters debating whether or not the character was feminist. Reader (and frequent letterhack) Jana C. Hollingsworth took issue with Ms. Marvel's entire origin:

For the eleven years I've been a comics fan, I've been proud of how Marvel resisted the temptation to create male-based heroines à la Supergirl. It's been proudly proclaimed that Ms. Marvel is not Marvel Girl; well, maybe the early Marvel Girl did have weak powers and an insipid personality, but at least her powers were her powers and her personality was her personality.... I hope you can change her costume if it's all possible, and keep her on her own instead of associating her with Captain Marvel....

Another reader had issue with the character's outfit: "Question: where is a woman who wears long sleeves, gloves, high boots and a scarf (winter wear), and at the same time has a bare back, belly, and legs? The Arctic equator? That costume requires a few alterations." These questions, and the controversial rape in The Avengers #200, caused many readers to question the character's portrayal, and whether she was a good role model for female readers:

As Carol [Strickland] pointed out in her article in LOC [#1], women tend to get very short shrift in comics. They are either portrayed as wallflowers or as supermacho insensitive men with different body forms, who almost invariably feel guilty about their lack of femininity. And it's always seemed to me that, why does this have to be exclusive? Can you not have a woman who is ruthless and capable and courageous and articulate and intelligent and all the other buzz-words—heroic when the need arises, and yet feminine and gentle and compassionate, at others? That was what I tried to do with Ms. Marvel. I tried to create a character who had all the attributes that made her a top-secret agent yet at the same time was a compassionate, warm, humorous, witty, intelligent, attractive woman.

It has been noted that "Danvers' initial appearances portrayed her as a strong character, but that changed over time—even after she gained super powers." When Ms. Marvel received her own title in the 2000s, Marvel Comics was "determined to have the character take center stage in the Marvel Universe", with "Joe Quesada and the other powers [having] had the character play major roles in their huge 'House of M' crossover, in the 'New Avengers' and in the gargantuan success that is 'Civil War'." "Writer Brian Reed has had Ms. Marvel overcome worthy challenges ranging from alien invasions, time-traveling sorcerers and former teammates turned enemy." Brian Reed's characterization of Ms. Marvel (in the "War of the Marvels" story arc) has been said to be "an engaging mix of bravado and aggression juxtaposed with compassion and empathy."

== Powers and abilities ==
=== Ms. Marvel ===
As Ms. Marvel, Carol Danvers initially possessed superhuman strength, speed, endurance, stamina, and physical durability. She has a precognitive "seventh sense" similar to a form of cosmic awareness, and a perfectly amalgamated human/Kree hybrid physiology that rendered her resistant to most toxins and poisons. She originally only had the power of flight thanks to a contraption under her suit.

=== Captain Marvel ===
Captain Marvel is superhumanly strong thanks both to her hybrid physiology and her ability to strengthen herself by absorbing energy. The specific level of strength has varied over the years, significantly increasing in recent times (especially after first becoming Binary), and is dependent on how empowered she is. Since she is able to absorb and manipulate various types of energy, she can use this redirected energy to temporarily increase her physical strength. Currently, her strength level at its resting rate allowed her to support the weight of a dead Celestial as one fell to Earth. She also possesses superhuman endurance, stamina, agility, durability, and reflexes. Although her top speed is unknown, she is capable of interplanetary flight (without additional oxygen), suggesting, at least, that she can go beyond ultrasonic limits. Danvers retains her "seventh sense", and can discharge explosive blasts of radiant energy, which she fires from her fingertips. She also demonstrates the ability to absorb other forms of energy, such as electricity, to further magnify her strength and energy projection, up to the force of an exploding nuclear weapon. Furthermore, she can temporarily assume her Binary form if empowered with a high enough infusion of energy. Danvers cannot absorb magical energy without consequence, although she aided Doctor Strange in the defeat of the mystic menace, Sir Warren Traveler. Thanks to her regenerative healing factor, Danvers is also able to recover faster and more competently than normal rate. Her regenerative healing factor allows her to have a form of decelerated aging and longevity. Additionally, Danvers is a trained armed and unarmed hand-to-hand combattant, pilot, and spy.

=== Binary ===
Carol Danvers first became Binary after being subjected to experiments performed by Brood scientists that physically linked her to the energy of a "white hole," allowing full control and manipulation of stellar energies, and therefore control over heat, the electromagnetic spectrum and gravity. Light speed travel and the ability to survive in the vacuum of space were also possible.

In Danvers's Binary form, her physical power and energy manipulation levels are much more powerful than in her regular state, but she reached her upper limits and overexerted herself when she greatly helped to cleanse the Earth's Sun from being gradually destroyed by an antimatter infection.

== Cultural impact and legacy ==
=== Critical response ===
Tom Stewart of Screen Rant described Danvers as one of Marvel's "reliable" and "relatable" characters, noting that she had become one of the publisher's most popular characters through the work of Kelly Sue DeConnick. He also called her a "smart and warm person" and praised her chemistry with Spider-Man. In particular, he highlighted a storyline in which a brain lesion threatened her life whenever she used her powers. Stewart considered Danvers' vulnerability a "grounding moment" for both herself and her readers, presenting a superhero who must confront her own mortality. Writing for Syfy, Sara Century said that Danvers' backstory is "perhaps the most truly bonkers" among Marvel's characters due to the multiple identities and roles she had assumed throughout her history. She observed that her early comic book appearances reflected the treatment of female superheroes at the time, noting their "casual sexism" and "poor characterization," as well as the tendency to portray female heroism as "mostly accidental." Nonetheless, she complimented the development of the character's personality, citing her independence, flirtatiousness, and "sharp unwillingness to allow herself to be pushed around." Century also argued that Danvers' imperfections contributed to her popularity, suggesting that her ability to "put ego aside and learn from her mistakes" made her one of Marvel's "most important characters."

The Washington Post's Shelly Tan observed that Danvers' history reflects the "highs and lows many female superheroes have gone through in their comic book portrayals." She acknowledged that the character was introduced as a superheroine intended to serve as a feminist role model. However, she found that Danvers' early stories undermined this ambition by portraying her as a "bystander in her own heroic story," particularly through her involuntary transformations into Ms. Marvel and the storyline in Avengers #200, in which she was kidnapped, brainwashed, and sexually assaulted. According to Tan, the character's assumption of the Captain Marvel mantle under writer Kelly Sue DeConnick marked a turning point, with the new costume and greater emphasis on her military background and ambitions providing a more developed characterization. She added that although Danvers had enjoyed a degree of popularity as Ms. Marvel, her transition to Captain Marvel led to a significant increase in her popularity. Elise Ringo of Tor.com called Danvers an " inspiring" and "empowering" character, citing her refusal to diminish herself to meet others' expectations. She also defined Danvers as a "tank, an unstoppable force, an unapologetically badass," underlining her assertive personality. Ringo also argued that Danvers' personal struggles, including alcoholism and occasional self-righteousness, made her appealing by highlighting her humanity, and considered her one of Marvel's "best characters."

Writing for The Guardian, Dorian Lynskey asserted that Danvers' success as Captain Marvel had "everything to do with great storytelling." He observed that the character was originally introduced as a "token feminist role model," describing her as a superpowered Gloria Steinem. Lynskey also noted that her costume was "striking and attractive but not oversexualised," and suggested that her adventures had helped her attract a loyal following of fans. Andrew Wheeler of ComicsAlliance named Danvers "Marvel's Biggest Female Hero," stating that under Kelly DeConnick's direction, Captain Marvel has reached her full potential. Wheeler noted that she no longer feels like a second-stringer or a legacy character. Instead, she is a quintessential superhero, not defined by her body or diminished by her gender. The name "Captain Marvel" and her militaristic, dignified costume are crucial to her newfound prominence. Patrick A. Reed of ComicsAlliance further declared that Danvers is one of the greatest heroes in the Marvel Universe and one of Marvel's most powerful and popular characters. Reed highlighted that she stars in her own best-selling series, is a prominent member of The Avengers and The Ultimates, and is featured on merchandise ranging from apparel to action figures. Additionally, they noted her significant role in the "Phase Three" expansion of Marvel's movie universe. Susana Polo of Polygon wrote that fans had long been requesting a female-led Marvel movie, but many of Marvel Comics' most famous superheroines, such as Rogue, Storm, and Jean Grey, had their film rights held by 20th Century Fox. With the Black Widow movie only recently becoming a reality, Polo noted that Captain Marvel, portrayed by Danvers, was not only the most powerful superheroine Marvel Studios could have chosen but also the most notable one. Richard Newby of The Hollywood Reporter stated that Danvers is unique and hard to compare to other superheroes. They found her entry into the MCU exciting due to her distinctiveness. Newby praised her for overcoming numerous challenges and achieving both relevance and dominance in a field where female legacy characters often struggle. They highlighted her journey of going "higher, further, faster" and ultimately becoming exactly who she is meant to be.

Alan Kistler of The Mary Sue described Danvers as a "fantastic hero," noting the rapid transformation of her status from a "B+" character to an A-list hero. Kistler praised her evolution under DeConnick's influence, emphasizing that Danvers now clearly deserves her own movie or live-action series. Delia Harrington of Den of Geek described Danvers as "one of Marvel's most popular heroes," noting her enduring appeal since her debut in 1968. Harrington highlighted that, despite numerous incarnations and transformations, Danvers' core traits—such as her loyalty, impulsive nature, independent spirit, and love of pop culture references—have consistently defined her as a fan favorite. Mike Cecchini of Den of Geek included Danvers in their "5 Female Marvel Superheroes Who Need Solo Films" list. Mey Rude of Autostraddle stated that Captain Marvel has gained a significant and vocal following online in recent years. Rude praised Kelly DeConnick for transforming Captain Marvel into a prominent superhero and feminist icon, now also set to star in her own upcoming movie. Rude also ranked Captain Marvel first in their "11 Female Superheroes I Wish Marvel Would Make Movies About" list. Arnold T. Blumberg of IGN referred to Danvers as a "feminist icon almost from the moment of her debut." IGN also ranked her Ms. Marvel persona 11th on their "Top 50 Avengers" list, making her the highest-ranked female character. Aparna Ukil of Sportskeeda ranked Danvers 1st in their "5 Best Female Comic Book Heroes" list.

Deidre Kaye of Scary Mommy ranked Danvers 2nd on their list of "195+ Marvel Female Characters Who Are Truly Heroic," describing her as one of the "most popular and well-loved female Marvel characters." Kaye highlighted Danvers as an ideal female STEM role model, noting her transition from a girl dreaming of space exploration to becoming an Air Force pilot and eventually working for NASA. Jo-Anne Rowney of Daily Mirror ranked Danvers 3rd in their "Best Female Superheroes Of All Time" list and praised her as one of the most powerful superheroes. Darren Franich of Entertainment Weekly ranked Danvers 6th in their "Let's Rank Every Avenger Ever" list. They noted that Danvers has experienced a significant resurgence in recent years, shedding her previous identity as "Ms. Marvel" to become the premier Captain Marvel. Franich praised her transformation, highlighting how she has evolved from a team player to a legendary figure poised for cinematic prominence. Rob Bricken of Gizmodo ranked Danvers 6th in their "Every Member Of The Avengers, Ranked" list. They described her as Marvel's "better" answer to Superman and Wonder Woman, highlighting her status as one of the Avengers' most formidable members. Bricken praised the character for becoming an essential part of the team, emphasizing her indispensable role since adopting the mantle of Captain Marvel.

Tanzim Pardiwalla of Mashable included Danvers in their "8 Badass Women of Marvel We Cannot Stop Fangirling Over" list. Pardiwalla praised Danvers for her compelling origin story and resilience, stating that her motto, "Higher. Faster. Stronger," reflects her determination. They highlighted Danvers' ability to overcome obstacles and continue striving, which contributes to her status as a powerful and inspiring icon. Sam Maggs of Marie Claire ranked Danvers 10th in their "Feminist Ranking of Female Superheroes" list, highlighting her as one of the "most feminist superheroes on the market." Maggs lauded Danvers for her pre-superpower accomplishments as an Air Force pilot and her enduring strength and resilience. They praised Danvers' adventurous spirit, noting her space travels with her cat and her role in the Avengers. Maggs also emphasized that Danvers maintains the original Captain Marvel's costume without unnecessary alterations, reflecting her strong, unapologetic character. Lance Cartelli of ComicBook.com ranked Danvers 17th in their "50 Most Important Superheroes Ever" list, asserting that despite her film debut yet to be released, Captain Marvel has already proven her significance. Cartelli highlighted Danvers' longstanding commitment to duty and honor, noting that she has been an important figure since her debut in 1967, even as her character has evolved through various iterations. George Marston of Newsarama ranked ranked Danvers 9th in their "Best Female Superheroes" list, asserting that she is one of the most powerful and arguably the top female hero in the Marvel Universe. Marston praised Danvers for her cosmic powers, fighter pilot background, high-profile movie, and significant Avengers membership, describing her as a quintessential superhero in a streamlined package. Marston also ranked her 8th in their "Best Avengers Members of All Time" list, highlighting her importance and impact within the Avengers.

Hugh Armitage of Digital Spy included Danvers in their "8 Female Comic Book Characters Who Deserve Their Own Movies" list, describing her as a "noble and super strong character." Mason Downey of GameSpot ranked Danvers 11th in their "15 Favorite Female Superheroes" list. Downey highlighted that Danvers is currently one of the most popular female superheroes, bolstered by a highly anticipated movie. They noted that Danvers' iconic status in the Marvel universe predates her film debut, thanks in large part to the influential work of Kelly Sue DeConnick, which emphasized her defining motto of "higher, further, faster, more." David Harth of Comic Book Resources ranked Danvers 7th in their "10 Best Marvel Legacy Heroes" list. Harth noted that although Captain Marvel's role in the Marvel Universe was initially secondary, Danvers significantly elevated the character when she took on the mantle. Despite a challenging journey during her time as Ms. Marvel, Danvers has established Captain Marvel as a leading figure in the Marvel Universe. As one of the most powerful female heroes, she is consistently at the forefront, making the Captain Marvel title distinctly her own. Madeline Catalano of MovieWeb highlighted that while the mantle of Captain Marvel has been held by various characters, Danvers stands out as one of the most relevant and formidable in the role. Her portrayal as Captain Marvel is seen as particularly powerful and significant among the many who have worn the title. Marco Vito Oddo and Jason Robbins of Collider ranked Danvers 13th in their "20 Most Powerful Marvel Characters" list, noting that while Captain Marvel's powers are impressive on-screen, she is even more formidable in the comics.

George Carmona of Comics Beat included Danvers in their list of the top ten best pilots in comics. Joshua Corvington of Sportskeeda ranked her ninth among the most overpowered superheroes in the Marvel Universe. Aaron Young of Looper placed Danvers thirteenth on their list of the strongest superheroes in history. The A.V. Club ranked her twentieth in their compilation of the best Marvel characters. Brent Frankenhoff of Comics Buyer's Guide listed her Ms. Marvel persona twenty-ninth in their ranking of the sexiest women in comics.

Additionally, Danvers consistently ranks highly across various superhero lists. Screen Rant and Comic Book Resources frequently feature her among the top Avengers, powerful superheroes, and iconic Captain Marvel versions. She is particularly noted for her strength and prominence, holding top spots in categories like most powerful Avengers, best costumes, and most influential cosmic characters.

=== Fandom ===
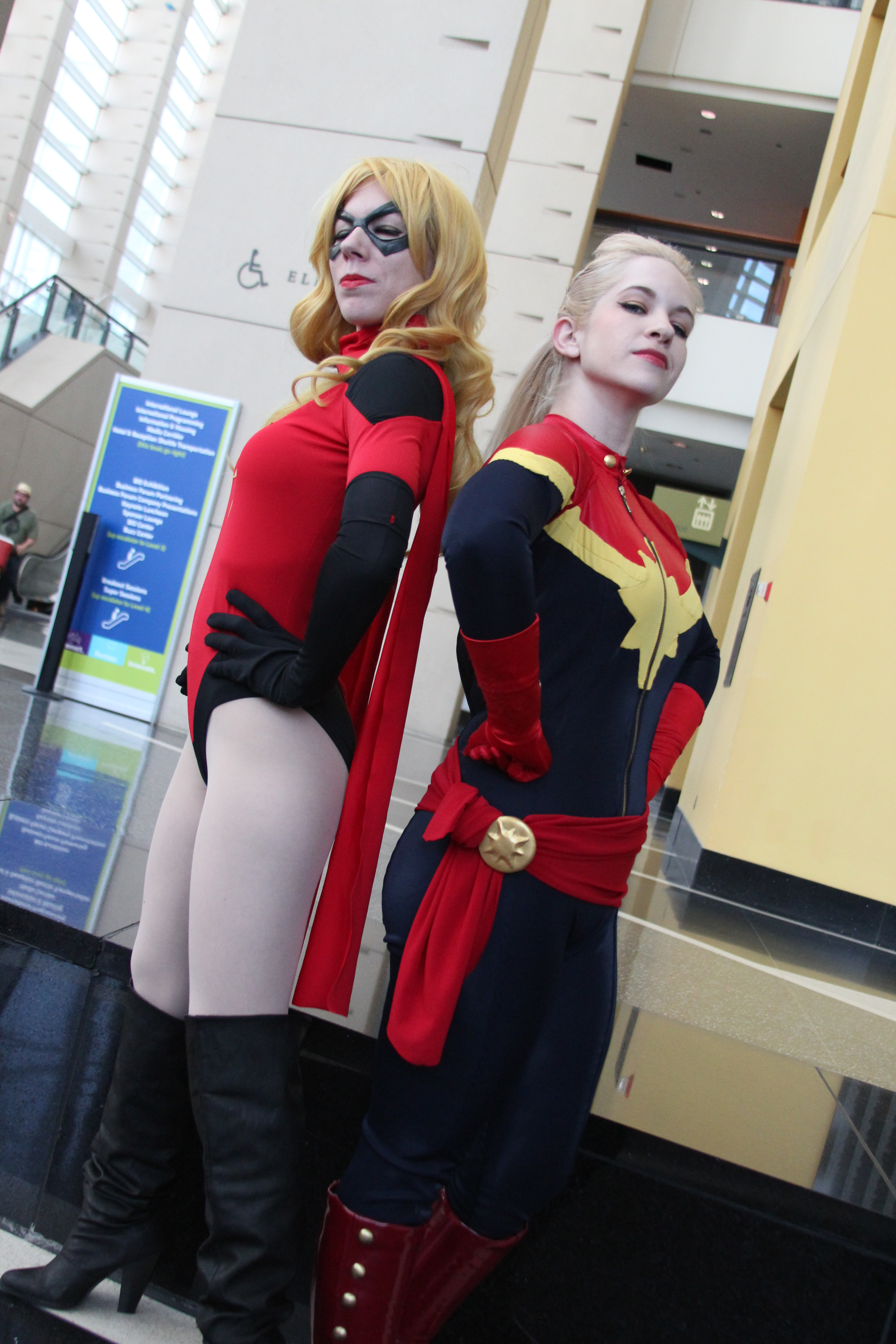
Cosplayers dressed as Ms. Marvel and Captain Marvel

Rachel Edidin of Wired asserted that Danvers has become a fan favorite, found especially strong support from the Carol Corps, a notably close-knit and predominantly female fanbase. Edidin praised the Corps for their vibrant and creative expressions of fandom, including crafting and cosplay, and their impactful contributions such as fundraising for girls' leadership initiatives and providing comfort through knitwear. Alex Abad-Santos of Vox said that Kelly Sue DeConnick's 2012 Captain Marvel comic, which propelled Danvers to a leadership role in the Avengers, also sparked the creation of the Carol Corps fandom. They found that this fan community, which is active online and at conventions, not only celebrates Danvers but also challenges the comic book industry's historical neglect of female characters and readers. Abad-Santos praised the Carol Corps for representing Danvers's resilience and for mirroring the character's journey toward prominence and inclusivity within the Marvel universe. Janelle Okwodu of Vogue stated that Captain Marvel achieved significant success due to its comic reboot and the enthusiastic support of its fanbase, the Carol Corps. They noted that this success could pave the way for a new wave of female-led comic titles and potentially influence the film industry similarly. Okwodu praised the film's potential to mirror the impact of Wonder Woman on box office trends, suggesting that Captain Marvel could be a catalyst for more Marvel female characters to gain prominence on the big screen.

Elise Ringo of Tor.com found that the Carol Corps represented more than just fan enthusiasm for a single superhero; it became a symbol of inclusivity and openness within the comics community, particularly for female fans and those feeling marginalized by mainstream fandom. Ringo praised the Carol Corps for its role in fostering a new, female-oriented comic book fandom, as highlighted by the Vulture panel at NYCC 2014 titled "Carol Corps and Beyond: The Future of Female Fandom." Abraham Josephine Riesman of Vulture noted that although Captain Marvel has not led sales charts, it has become a significant fan phenomenon. The series inspired the formation of the Carol Corps, who celebrate Danvers, feminism, and superhero comics. Riesman praised the Carol Corps for its cultural impact, which led to a dedicated panel at New York Comic Con, reflecting the strong presence and enthusiasm of its members. Riesman highlighted Danvers as an engaging character with a unique background and personal traits, contributing to the fervent excitement around her big-screen debut in 2018. Caitlin Rosberg of Polygon observed that the comic book industry has historically been unwelcoming to new fans, particularly those who are not white or male. However, Rosberg noted that the rise of the Carol Corps and the announcement of Danvers as Captain Marvel marked a significant moment of change. This period saw a more welcoming environment for women, supported by other influential works and characters like those in Nimona, Lumberjanes, and Ms. Marvel. Rosberg highlighted how the Carol Corps contributed to this shift, with their active presence on social media, at conventions, and in their passionate support for diverse comic book stories.

=== Impact ===
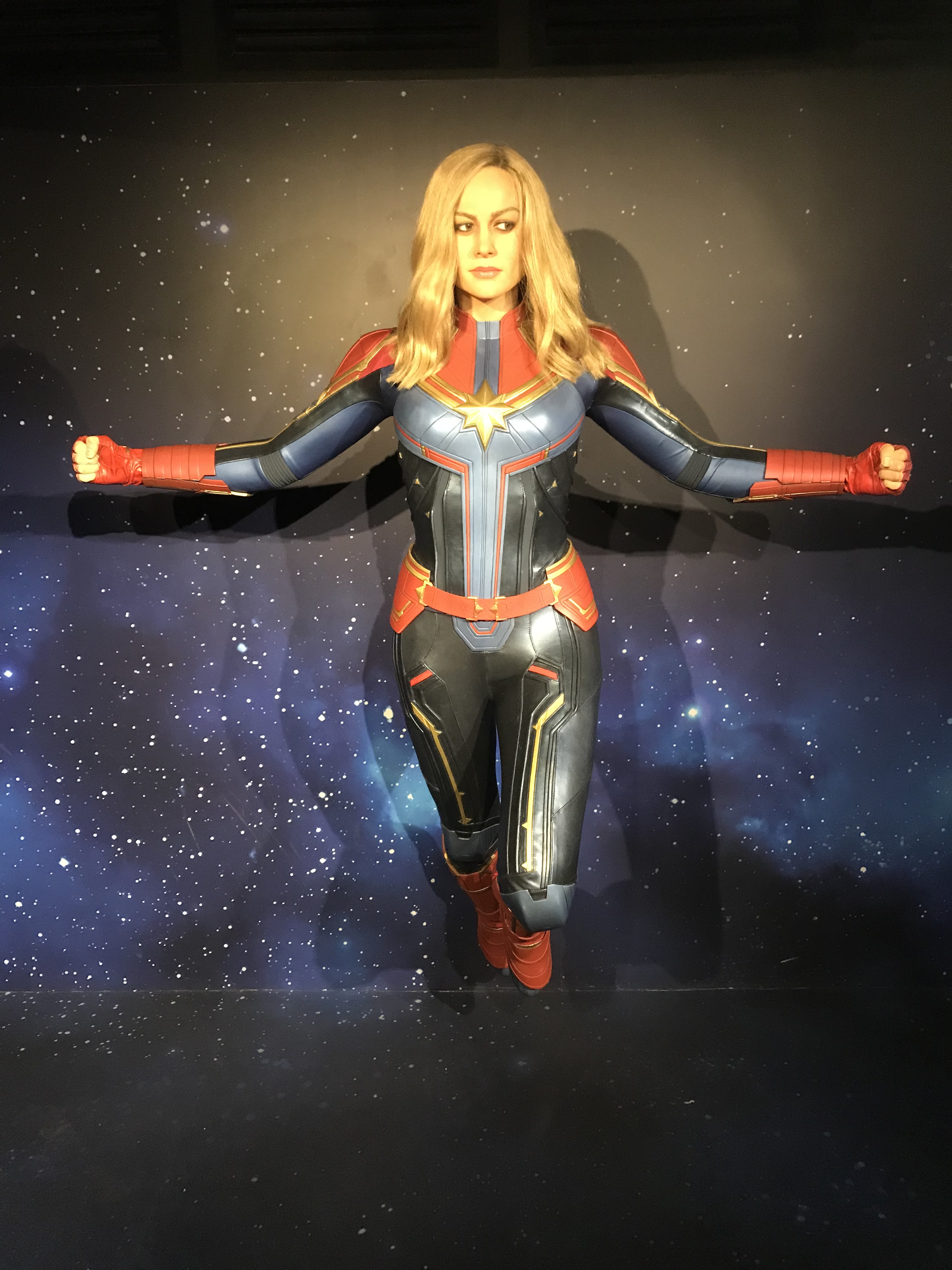
Captain Marvel at Madame Tussauds London

The role of Carol Danvers has garnered interest from various actors who have expressed their desire to portray the character in the Marvel Cinematic Universe (MCU). Canadian actress Katheryn Winnick shared fan art on her Instagram that showcases her in the character's costume in 2014. Winnick expressed her gratitude to her fans for their support and excitement surrounding the potential role, stating, "Got the greatest and most loyal fans out there!" on Instagram. In 2015, American actress Bryce Dallas Howard also indicated her interest in taking on the role of Danvers. This interest was echoed by American actress and martial artist Ronda Rousey, who also shared her desire to portray Danvers through social media in 2015. She initially shared her enthusiasm for the role during a Reddit AMA and later showcased fan art of herself as the character on her Instagram account. She then received numerous edits of herself portrayed as Danvers in both her Ms. Marvel and Captain Marvel forms on social media, which led to significant press coverage.

Danvers was adapted into a feature film that garnered substantial attention. In February 2019, she made her cinematic debut in her own film, Captain Marvel, which quickly gained widespread popularity. Portrayed by Brie Larson, the film grossed over $1.1 billion worldwide. It marked a significant milestone as the first female-led superhero film to surpass this mark. It also became the fifth-highest-grossing film of 2019 and the 23rd-highest-grossing film of all time during its theatrical run.

The character's influence has extended beyond the screen, impacting cultural trends and costume choices. In October 2019, FandangoNOW announced that the Carol Danvers / Captain Marvel costume emerged as the most popular female Halloween costume according to their survey. Furthermore, BuyCostumes.com reported Danvers' Captain Marvel as the sixth most popular Halloween costume for adults in October 2022, with American media personality Paris Hilton being among those who dressed as her for Halloween.

The popularity of Danvers has resulted in her representation across various forms of media and entertainment. In 2019, a wax figure of Carol Danvers / Captain Marvel was unveiled at Madame Tussauds New York, inspired by the Marvel Cinematic Universe (MCU) incarnation of the character. In 2022, Disneyland Paris inaugurated a Marvel Cinematic Universe–themed area called the Avengers Campus located at Walt Disney Studios Park. It featured the attraction Avengers Assemble: Flight Force, a theme park ride based on the MCU iterations of Carol Danvers and Tony Stark, who serve as the protagonists of the attraction's lore.

== In other media ==
=== Television ===
- Carol Danvers / Ms. Marvel appears in the X-Men: The Animated Series episode "A Rogue's Tale", voiced by Roscoe Handford. At Mystique's behest, Rogue acquires Ms. Marvel's powers. While the latter is left in a coma, an "echo" of her remained in Rogue's mind and threatens to take over. In response, Jean Grey enters Rogue's mind and seal the echo away to keep Rogue from going insane. Afterwards, Rogue visits Danvers in the hospital and restores her brain activity.
- Carol Danvers / Ms. Marvel appears in The Super Hero Squad Show, voiced by Grey DeLisle. This version is a S.H.I.E.L.D. agent and superior of the eponymous squad.
- Carol Danvers / Ms. Marvel appears in The Avengers: Earth's Mightiest Heroes, voiced by Jennifer Hale. This version is an agent of S.W.O.R.D. before joining the Avengers.
- Carol Danvers / Captain Marvel appears in Avengers Assemble, voiced again by Grey DeLisle. This version is a member of the Avengers.
- Carol Danvers / Captain Marvel appears in Guardians of the Galaxy, voiced again by Grey DeLisle.
- Carol Danvers / Captain Marvel appears in Spider-Man, voiced again by Grey DeLisle. This version is a member of the Avengers.
- Carol Danvers / Captain Marvel appears in Marvel Rising: Heart of Iron, voiced by Kim Raver.
- Carol Danvers / Captain Marvel appears in Marvel Future Avengers, voiced by Eriko Hirata in Japanese and Erica Lindbeck in English.
- Carol Danvers / Captain Marvel makes a non-speaking cameo appearance in the Moon Girl and Devil Dinosaur episode "Today, I Am a Woman".
- Carol Danvers / Captain Marvel appears in Lego Marvel Avengers: Climate Conundrum, voiced by Rebecca Shoichet.

=== Film ===
- Carol Danvers / Captain Marvel appears in Marvel Super Hero Adventures: Frost Fight!, voiced again by Grey DeLisle.
- Carol Danvers / Captain Marvel appears in Avengers Confidential: Black Widow & Punisher.
- Carol Danvers / Captain Marvel appears in Marvel Rising: Secret Warriors, voiced by Kim Raver.

=== Marvel Cinematic Universe ===
Carol Danvers / Captain Marvel appears in media set in the Marvel Cinematic Universe (MCU), portrayed by Brie Larson. This version was originally a test pilot working under Dr. Wendy Lawson in 1989 before she was shot down by a Kree squadron while piloting a plane with an experimental engine, which granted her her powers. For her first appearance in her live-action eponymous film (2019), her "Binary" powers take on a fiery appearance, which was influenced by a more scientifically accurate interpretation of her abilities compared to previous depictions along with influence from the anime series Dragon Ball Z, as well as other comic books and video games. Following Captain Marvel, Danvers subsequently appears in the live-action films Avengers: Endgame (2019), Shang-Chi and the Legend of the Ten Rings (2021), and The Marvels (2023), along with the live-action Disney+ series Ms. Marvel. Alternate timeline versions of Danvers appear in the Disney+ animated series What If...? (2021), voiced by Alexandra Daniels.

=== Video games ===
- Carol Danvers appears as a non-playable character (NPC) in the PSP version of X-Men Legends II: Rise of Apocalypse.
- Carol Danvers / Ms. Marvel appears as a playable character in Marvel: Ultimate Alliance, voiced by April Stewart.
- Carol Danvers / Ms. Marvel appears as a playable character in Marvel: Ultimate Alliance 2, voiced again by April Stewart. This version is a member of the New Avengers.
- Carol Danvers / Ms. Marvel appears as a playable character in Marvel Super Hero Squad, voiced again by Grey DeLisle.
- Carol Danvers / Ms. Marvel appears as a card in Ultimate Marvel vs. Capcom 3's "Heroes vs. Heralds" mode.
- Carol Danvers / Ms. Marvel appears as a playable character in Marvel Avengers Alliance.
- Carol Danvers appears in Zen Pinball 2 via the "Women of Power" DLC pack's A-Force table.
- Carol Danvers / Ms. Marvel appears as a playable character in Marvel Super Hero Squad Online, voiced again by Grey DeLisle.
- Carol Danvers as Ms. Marvel and Captain Marvel appears as a playable character in Marvel Heroes, voiced by Danielle Nicolet.
- Carol Danvers as Ms. Marvel and Captain Marvel appears in Marvel Puzzle Quest.
- Carol Danvers / Ms. Marvel appears as a playable character in Lego Marvel Super Heroes, voiced again by Danielle Nicolet.
- Carol Danvers / Captain Marvel appears as a playable character in Marvel Avengers Alliance Tactics.
- Carol Danvers / Captain Marvel appears in Disney Infinity 2.0, voiced by Jennifer Hale.
- Carol Danvers as Ms. Marvel and Captain Marvel appear as separate playable characters in Marvel Contest of Champions.
- Carol Danvers / Captain Marvel appears as a playable character in Marvel: Future Fight, with Danvers as Ms. Marvel additionally appearing as an alternate costume.
- Carol Danvers as Ms. Marvel and Warbird appears as a playable character in Lego Marvel's Avengers, voiced again by Danielle Nicolet. Additionally, Danvers as Captain Marvel appears in the "Women of Power" DLC.
- Carol Danvers / Captain Marvel appears as a playable character in Marvel Avengers Academy, voiced by Hannah Laurel.
- Carol Danvers / Captain Marvel appears as a playable character in Marvel Powers United VR, voiced by Laura Bailey.
- Carol Danvers / Captain Marvel appears as a playable character in Marvel vs. Capcom: Infinite, voiced again by Grey DeLisle. Additionally, Danvers as Warbird appears as an alternate skin, along with a PlayStation 4 exclusive skin, Major Carol Danvers.
- Carol Danvers / Captain Marvel appears as a playable character in Lego Marvel Super Heroes 2, voiced by Kate O'Sullivan.
- Carol Danvers / Captain Marvel appears as a playable character in Marvel Strike Force.
- Carol Danvers / Captain Marvel appears in Marvel Battle Lines.
- Carol Danvers / Captain Marvel appears as a playable character in Marvel Super War.
- Carol Danvers / Captain Marvel appears in Marvel Ultimate Alliance 3: The Black Order, voiced again by Erica Lindbeck. This version is a member of the Avengers.
- Carol Danvers / Captain Marvel appears in Marvel Dimension of Heroes, voiced again by Grey DeLisle.
- Carol Danvers / Captain Marvel appears in Marvel Duel.
- Carol Danvers / Captain Marvel appears as a playable character in Marvel Future Revolution, voiced again by Erica Lindbeck. Additionally, several alternate reality versions of Danvers appear as NPCs, such as one who joined the Nova Corps when her Earth was colonized by Xandarian refugees and one who became a thrall of Dormammu.
- Carol Danvers / Captain Marvel appears as a purchasable cosmetic outfit in Fortnite Battle Royale.
- Carol Danvers / Captain Marvel appears in Marvel Snap.
- Carol Danvers / Captain Marvel appears as a playable character in Marvel's Midnight Suns, voiced again by Erica Lindbeck. This version is a member of the Avengers.

=== Motion comics ===
- Carol Danvers / Ms. Marvel appears in the Spider-Woman: Agent of S.W.O.R.D. motion comic, voiced by Tena Nelson.
- Carol Danvers / Captain Marvel appears in the War of the Realms: Marvel Ultimate Comics motion comic, voiced by Jewel Staite.

=== Merchandise ===
- In 2019, Iron Studios released a Carol Danvers / Captain Marvel figurine inspired by the Marvel Cinematic Universe (MCU) incarnation of the character.
- In 2023, Hasbro released a Carol Danvers / Captain Marvel action figure inspired by the Marvel Cinematic Universe (MCU) incarnation of the character, as part of the Marvel Legends action figure line.

=== Theme parks ===
- Carol Danvers / Ms. Marvel appears in Marvel Super Heroes 4D, voiced again by Jennifer Hale.
- Carol Danvers / Captain Marvel appears in the theme park attraction Avengers: Quantum Encounter on the Disney Wish cruise ship, with Brie Larson reprising her role as the character.
- Carol Danvers / Captain Marvel appears in the theme park attraction Avengers Assemble: Flight Force in Disneyland Paris, with Brie Larson reprising her role as the character.

=== Miscellaneous ===
- A Carol Danvers / Captain Marvel prose novel by Shannon Hale and Dean Hale was announced at New York Comic Con 2015.
- Carol Danvers / Captain Marvel appears in the Marvel Universe: LIVE! stage show.

== Collected editions ==
Title	Material collected	Publication date	ISBN
Ms. Marvel (1977–1979)
Essential Ms. Marvel, Vol. 1	Ms. Marvel #1–23; Marvel Super-Heroes Magazine #10–11; Avengers Annual #10	February 2007	978-0-7851-2499-3 (SC)
Ms. Marvel Epic Collection, Vol. 1: This Woman, This Warrior	Ms. Marvel #1–14; Marvel Team-Up #61–62; Defenders #57	January 2019	978-1-302-91639-8 (SC)
Ms. Marvel Epic Collection, Vol. 2: The Woman Who Fell to Earth	Ms. Marvel #15–23; Marvel Two-In-One #51; Marvel Super-Heroes #10–11; Avengers #200, Annual #10; material from Avengers #197–199; Marvel Fanfare #24	May 2019	978-1-302-91802-6 (SC)
Captain Marvel: Ms. Marvel: A Hero is Born	Ms. Marvel #1–23; Marvel Team-Up #61–62, #76–77; Defenders #57; Marvel Two-In-One #51; Marvel Super-Heroes #10–11; Avengers #200, Annual #10; material from Avengers #197–199; Marvel Fanfare #24	February 2019	978-1-302-91539-1 (HC)
Ms. Marvel (2006–2010)
Vol. 1: Best of the Best	Ms. Marvel vol. 2 #1–5; Giant-Size Ms. Marvel	October 2006	978-0-7851-2281-4 (HC); 978-0-7851-1996-8 (SC)
Vol. 2: Civil War	Ms. Marvel vol. 2 #6–10; Ms. Marvel Special	March 2007	978-0-7851-2304-0 (HC); 978-0-7851-2305-7 (SC)
Vol. 3: Operation Lightning Storm	Ms. Marvel vol. 2 #11–17	October 2007	978-0-7851-2890-8 (HC); 978-0-7851-2449-8 (SC)
Vol. 4: Monster Smash	Ms. Marvel vol. 2 #18–24	March 2008	978-0-7851-3018-5 (HC); 978-0-7851-2813-7 (SC)
Vol. 5: Secret Invasion	Ms. Marvel vol. 2 #25–30	October 2008	978-0-7851-3019-2 (HC); 978-0-7851-3299-8 (SC)
Vol. 6: Ascension	Ms. Marvel vol. 2 #31–34, Annual #1; Ms. Marvel Special: Storyteller	March 2009	978-0-7851-3457-2 (HC); 978-0-7851-3178-6 (SC)
Vol. 7: Dark Reign	Ms. Marvel vol. 2 #35–41	September 2009	978-0-7851-3838-9 (HC); 978-0-7851-3839-6 (SC)
Vol. 8: War of the Marvels	Ms. Marvel vol. 2 #42–46	December 2009	978-0-7851-3840-2 (HC); 978-0-7851-3841-9 (SC)
Vol. 9: Best You Can Be	Ms. Marvel vol. 2 #47–50	April 2010	978-0-7851-4573-8 (HC); 978-0-7851-4574-5 (SC)
Captain Marvel: Carol Danvers—The Ms. Marvel Years, Vol. 1	Giant-Size Ms. Marvel #1; Ms. Marvel vol. 2 #1–17; and Ms. Marvel Special #1	February 2018	978-1-302-91014-3 (SC)
Captain Marvel: Carol Danvers—The Ms. Marvel Years, Vol. 2	Ms. Marvel vol. 2 #18–34; and Annual #1	June 2018	978-1-302-91174-4 (SC)
Captain Marvel: Carol Danvers—The Ms. Marvel Years, Vol. 3	Ms. Marvel vol. 2 #35–50; Ms. Marvel Special: Storyteller; and Siege: Spider-Man	December 2018	978-1-302-91563-6 (SC)
Captain Marvel (2012–2014)
Vol. 1: In Pursuit of Flight	Captain Marvel vol. 7 #1–6	January 2013	978-0-7851-6549-1 (SC)
Vol. 2: Down	Captain Marvel vol. 7 #7–12	June 2013	978-0-7851-6550-7 (SC)
Avengers: The Enemy Within	Avengers: The Enemy Within #1; Captain Marvel vol. 7 #13–14, 17; Avengers Assemble Vol. 2 #16–17	December 2013	978-0-7851-8403-4 (SC)
Infinity Companion	Captain Marvel Vol. 7 #15–16	April 2014	978-0-7851-8886-5 (HC)
Captain Marvel: Earth's Mightiest Hero Vol. 1	Captain Marvel vol. 7 #1–12	June 2016	978-1-302-90127-1 (SC)
Captain Marvel: Earth's Mightiest Hero Vol. 2	Captain Marvel vol. 7 #13–17; Avengers: The Enemy Within #1; Avengers Assemble #16–19; Avenging Spider-Man #9–10	November 2016	978-1-302-90128-8 (SC)
Captain Marvel (2014–2015)
Captain Marvel Vol. 1: Higher, Further, Faster, More	Captain Marvel vol. 8 #1–6	October 2014	978-0-7851-9013-4 (SC)
Captain Marvel Vol. 2: Stay Fly	Captain Marvel vol. 8 #7–11	April 2015	978-0-7851-9014-1 (SC)
Captain Marvel Vol. 3: Alis Volat Propriis	Captain Marvel vol. 8 #12–15	September 2015	978-0-7851-9841-3 (SC)
Captain Marvel & the Carol Corps	Captain Marvel & the Carol Corps #1–4	December 2015	978-0-7851-9865-9 (SC)
Captain Marvel: Earth's Mightiest Hero Vol. 3	Captain Marvel vol. 8 #1–11	February 2017	978-1-302-90268-1 (SC)
Captain Marvel: Earth's Mightiest Hero Vol. 4	Captain Marvel vol. 8 #12–15, Captain Marvel & the Carol Corps #1–4	August 2017	978-1-302-90269-8 (SC)
Captain Marvel (2016–2017)
Captain Marvel Vol. 1: Rise of Alpha Flight	Captain Marvel vol. 9 #1–5	August 2016	978-0-7851-9642-6 (SC)
Captain Marvel Vol. 2: Civil War II	Captain Marvel vol. 9 #6–10	February 2017	978-0-7851-9643-3 (SC)
Captain Marvel: Earth's Mightiest Hero Vol. 5	Captain Marvel vol. 9 #1–10	February 2019	978-1-302-91541-4 (SC)
The Mighty Captain Marvel (2017–2018)
The Mighty Captain Marvel Vol. 1: Alien Nation	The Mighty Captain Marvel vol. 1 #0–4	September 2017	978-1-302-90605-4 (SC)
The Mighty Captain Marvel Vol. 2: Band of Sisters	The Mighty Captain Marvel vol. 2 #5–9	December 2017	978-1-302-90606-1 (SC)
The Mighty Captain Marvel Vol. 3: Dark Origins	The Mighty Captain Marvel vol. 3 #10–14 (renumbered as Captain Marvel #125–129)	June 2018	978-1-302-90607-8 (SC)
The Life of Captain Marvel (2018)
The Life of Captain Marvel	The Life of Captain Marvel #1–5	February 2019	978-1-302-91253-6 (SC)
Captain Marvel (2019–2023)
Captain Marvel Vol. 1: Re-Entry	Captain Marvel vol. 10 #1–5	August 2019	978-1-302-91687-9 (SC)
Captain Marvel Vol. 2: Falling Star	Captain Marvel vol. 10 #6-11	January 2020	978-1-302-91688-6 (SC)
Captain Marvel Vol. 3: The Last Avenger	Captain Marvel vol. 10 #12-17	September 2020	978-1-302-92308-2 (SC)
Captain Marvel Vol. 4: Accused	Captain Marvel vol. 10 #18-21, Empyre (2020) #2	November 2020	978-1-302-92562-8 (SC)
Captain Marvel Vol. 5: The New World	Captain Marvel vol. 10 #22-26	May 2021	978-1-302-92595-6 (SC)
Captain Marvel Vol. 6: Strange Magic	Captain Marvel vol. 10 #27-30	October 2021	978-1-302-92596-3 (SC)
Captain Marvel Vol. 7: The Last Of The Marvels	Captain Marvel vol. 10 #31-36	April 2022	978-1-302-92884-1 (SC)
Captain Marvel Vol. 8: The Trials	Captain Marvel vol. 10 #37-41 and Annual #1	October 2022	978-1-302-93264-0 (SC)
Captain Marvel Vol. 9: Revenge of the Brood Part 1	Captain Marvel vol. 10 #42-46	May 2023	978-1-302-94762-0 (SC)
Captain Marvel Vol. 10: Revenge of the Brood Part 2	Captain Marvel vol. 10 #47-50	September 2023	978-1-302-94763-7 (SC)
Captain Marvel (2023–24)
Captain Marvel Vol. 1: The Omen	Captain Marvel vol. 11 #1–5	May 2024	978-1-302-95705-6 (SC)
Captain Marvel Vol. 2: The Undone	Captain Marvel vol. 11 #6-10	October 2024	978-1-302-95706-3 (SC)

== See also ==
- List of feminist comic books
- Portrayal of women in comics
