= Nightmare Inspector: Yumekui Kenbun =

Japanese manga series

- First tankōbon volume cover

夢喰見聞 (Yumekui Kenbun)
- Genre: Dark fantasy; Mystery; Supernatural
- Manga
- Written by: Shin Mashiba
- Published by: Enix (2001–03); Square Enix (2003–07)
- English publisher: NA: Viz Media
- Magazine: Monthly Stencil (2001–03); Monthly GFantasy (2003–07)
- Original run: October 27, 2001 – February 17, 2007
- Volumes: 9

Nightmare Inspector: Yumekui Kenbun (Japanese: 夢喰見聞, Hepburn: Yumekui Kenbun) is a Japanese manga series created by Shin Mashiba. It was first serialized in Enix's shōjo manga magazine Monthly Stencil in 2001 and was later transferred to Square Enix shōnen manga magazine Monthly GFantasy, where it ran from 2003 to 2007. Its chapters were collected in nine tankōbon volumes. The manga has been licensed in North America by Viz Media. The story set during the end of the Taishō Era in Japan.

== Plot ==
When a person has nightmares they go to Hiruko, a Baku that resides at the Silver Star tea shop, for help. Hiruko enters their dream with a supernatural cane that puts people to sleep to sort out the nightmare before fetching it to eat for himself. Each customer that Hiruko helps and satisfy his taste, overarchs a piece of history and origins of the Silver Star's baku residents.

== Characters ==
Hiruko (蛭孤)
The current baku who resides in the Silver Star Tea House that appeared after Azusa had left. He walks with his customers in their dreams in hopes of getting the luxury of eating a delicious nightmare afterwards. Seeming rather selfish and apathetic, he is actually very caring of his customers and often goes out of his way to help them, although he would never admit to it. Being a baku, he cannot eat anything but a nightmare, or he will ultimately end up coughing up blood. The bloodier, gruesome, and pain-filled a nightmare is, the tastier he finds it.
Before Azusa had passed on the baku to him, Hiruko was known as Chitose Kurosu (黒須 千寿, Kurosu Chitose). He served no real purpose in the world other than to be a simple toy to his masters, which resulted in being tied up and being tortured in various ways, including his limbs being broken so that he could not run away or kill himself, leaving him unable to do anything but think and scream. He often fantasized of the life he wanted, but his fantasies went too far and were deluded, which eventually changed into a nightmare. It is described in the manga that his nightmare had "consumed" Azusa when he took him to the Delirium to have his fantasy become a reality, and in the process Hiruko became the successive baku of Azusa. Azusa found him in the rubble of a cellar after the Great Kato earthquake.
Mizuki Asahina (朝比奈 霧霞, Asahina Mitsuki)
A rather humble and pretty girl; the sister of Azusa. She owns the Silver Star Tea House and cleans it daily, even though not many customers drop by. A slight depression set into her after Azusa had left, leaving her feeling empty inside and even had a recurring nightmare of the day Hiruko came into the tea house to replace Azusa. However, she covers it up as if nothing had happened and shows a great deal of friendliness toward her few customers as well as Hiruko, and even pleasantly puts up with Hifumi. Her deepest wish is for her brother, Azusa to return to the Silver Star Tea House and continues to believe that as long as Hiruko remains there, someday her brother will return as well.
Azusa Asahina (朝比奈 梓, Asahina Azusa)
Mizuki's older brother, who is explained to be "missing". He hated being the inconvenient son of their father's mistress and was rather depressive, however kind, leaving Mizuki feeling empathetic. For a few nights he had a reoccurring nightmare, in which his body faded more each night. During one night he was visited by the original baku, Hiruko in spirit form (seen as an anthropomorphic tapir), who wanted to end his own existence. A baku cannot die, therefore the only way for this to occur is to pass the baku on to someone else, which Azusa willingly becomes to forfeit his human life. Mizuki had explained that he was the same Azusa as he was before, just colder to the touch, but his mental health had changed. From then forward, the Silver Star Tea House was visited by conflicted people who wanted their nightmares resolved by Azusa. However, Azusa was soon crazed by the lust for the greatest nightmare, and one day disappeared, soon to be replaced by the current baku.
It is later explained that the current baku's own nightmare had eaten Azusa instead of Azusa eating it, and that same nightmare is now kept inside the briefcase that Hiruko carries around. An eerie and cold feeling is said to overcome anyone to pick up the briefcase besides Hiruko, Naamu (Hifumi's black cat) does not seem to be affected by the cold feeling as he is often seen sitting on it.
Hifumi Misumi (三角 一二三, Misumi Hifumi)
A wealthy, laid back boy of bizarre tastes; he adores Mizuki and irritates Hiruko. He currently is a boarder at the Silver Star Tea House -- along with his pet cat, Naamu (ナアム, Nightmare?), who has taken a liking to Hiruko and his briefcase -- however his initial plan was not to stay there: he had only visited the tea house to see where a baku would live, but had fallen in love with Mizuki at first sight and then grew suspicions about her and Hiruko's relationship, therefore he decided to stay. He turned quite more loyal to Mizuki and the tea house, saying he will "keep paying rent until he dies" (which Hiruko mocks him about, saying that he is only needed at the Silver Star for his rent money). Despite all turmoil that surrounds the tea house, he has gotten used to living there and with Hiruko.
Hifumi has weekly visits to a "rumor group", where he and his friends waste their time collecting rumors about Hiruko and the Delirium. They seem to be quite the nuisance, which is expected from his friends. However, they add some nice comic relief to the manga. Hifumi was very briefly (and unwillingly) engaged to Rokkaku Shigoroku, a woman who looks and acts exactly like him in volume eight. Hifumi's father was lonely and wanted to get back the feeling of having loving family (Hifumi now left home to live in a rental room at the tea house, his wife became distant and independent, he now only had a statue of her long "dead" former loving self as a memorial), but the marriage was called off when it became apparent the two were too strange to be allowed to be together.
Kairi (戒吏)
The owner of the Delirium, who is often lost in a trance, or more specifically, a fantasy. His fantasies are always nonsensical (and usually quite alarming to anyone beholding Kairi while fantasizing), and frequently include Hiruko. His fantasies are so strong that if he enters a room, the resulting chaos is enough to overload and destroy the room. He says that he is "the key" as he is the only one who can unlock the rooms in the Delirium, where fantasies become reality.
Shima (シマ)
An odd, cheerful child who assists Kairi at the Delirium, who is often seen cleaning. He is the one that takes care of the building itself, as well as Kairi. Shima also watches over the customers when they first arrive if Kairi is in a fantasy at the current time. He can relate to Hifumi in the way that both Kairi and Hiruko are similar in nature. In the final volume of Nightmare Inspector (vol. 9), it is finally revealed the significance of Shima. Shima is in fact a room in the Delirium, fantasizing itself as a human. Within the room is Chitose's broken body, creating the ongoing illusion of Chitose as Hiruko. Shima is returned to door form when he falls asleep, which is impossible unless a Baku intervenes and forces him to do so. However, the Baku is transformed into the key to the door, and can only be returned to their previous state when removed from the keyhole. When the key (the baku) is removed from the keyhole, Shima turns into a human again.
Tsukishiro (月白)
A rival baku that appears in volume six. He was said to have met Hiruko two years previously, when Hiruko first became a baku. He is a rather gruesome baku that longs for the perfect nightmare, much like Azusa. Instead of helping his customers like Hiruko does, he enters their nightmares and alters them to make them worse. Once the nightmare is ripe enough, as Tsukishiro describes it, he harvests the nightmare before it rots. When Hiruko and Tsukishiro both realized that the other was a baku (neither of them having realized this fact upon their first encounter), Tsukishiro recommended that the two team up to make nightmares far more horrible than one baku could do alone, thus more delicious. However, Hiruko declined him, saying that he would not go beyond the request of what his customer wanted to be done for their nightmare.

== Publication ==
Written and illustrated by Shin Mashiba, Nightmare Inspector: Yumekui Kenbun debuted in Enix's shōjo manga magazine Monthly Stencil on October 27, 2001. The series was transferred to Square Enix's shōnen manga magazine Monthly GFantasy in 2003, before Monthly Stencil ceased its publication in that same year. The series finished on February 17, 2007. Square Enix collected its chapters in nine tankōbon volumes, released from July 27, 2002, to April 27, 2007.

In North America, the manga was licensed for English release by Viz Media. The nine volumes were released from April 8, 2008, to August 11, 2009. The series was also digitally published by Square Enix on their online store from December 2010 to May 2013, when the publisher ended its service.

== See also ==
- Yokai Rental Shop, another manga series by the same author
