= Sojourner =

A sojourner is a person who resides temporarily in a place.

Sojourner may also refer to:

== People ==
- Sojourner Truth (1797–1883), abolitionist and women's rights activist
- Albert Sojourner (1872–1951), member of the Mississippi House of Representatives
- Melanie Sojourner (born 1968) member of the Mississippi State Senate
- Mike Sojourner (born 1953), American retired National Basketball League player
- Sabrina Sojourner (born 1952), American politician previously serving as DC's shadow representative from 1997 to 1999
- Willie Sojourner (1943–2005), basketball player and brother of Mike Sojourner

== Media ==
- Sojourners, a Christian monthly magazine
- Sojourner, a member of the DC Comics superhero team Hellenders
- Sojourner Mullein, a Green Lantern from DC Comics.
- Sojourner (album) a box set by the alternative country band Magnolia Electric Co.
- "Sojourner", a song by the Smashing Pumpkins from Atum: A Rock Opera in Three Acts, 2023
- Sojourner (magazine), US feminist magazine published in Cambridge between 1975 and 2002.

== Other uses ==
- Sojourner (rover), a robotic rover that was part of the Mars Pathfinder mission

== See also ==
- Sojourner-Douglass College, a private learning institution named after the abolitionist
- Sojourner Bolt, the ring name of wrestler Josette Bynum
- Sojourn (disambiguation)
