= Sojourn =

Sojourn may refer to:

== Books and periodicals ==
- Sojourn (comics), a CrossGen comic book series
- Sojourn (journal), a journal of social and cultural issues in Southeast Asia
- Sojourn (novel), the 1991 novel in the Dark Elf Trilogy by R. A. Salvatore
- The Sojourn, a 2011 novel by Andrew Krivak

== Music ==
- Sojourn (album), a 1977 album by Mickey Tucker
- "Sojourn", a song by Natasha Bedingfield from the 2004 album Unwritten
- "Sojourn", a song by Joji from the 2026 album Piss in the Wind
- Sojourn Music, an American Christian music group

== Other uses ==
- "Sojourn" (American Horror Story), a television episode
- Sojourn, a predecessor of TorilMUD, a text-based online role-playing game
- Sojourn (Overwatch), a playable character from the video game Overwatch
- Sevoflurane, trade name Sojourn, an inhalational anaesthetic
- Sojourn Shelton (born 1994), American football player

== See also ==
- Sojourner (disambiguation)
