= Kingston Methodist Church =

Historic church in Mississippi, United States

- U.S. National Register of Historic Places
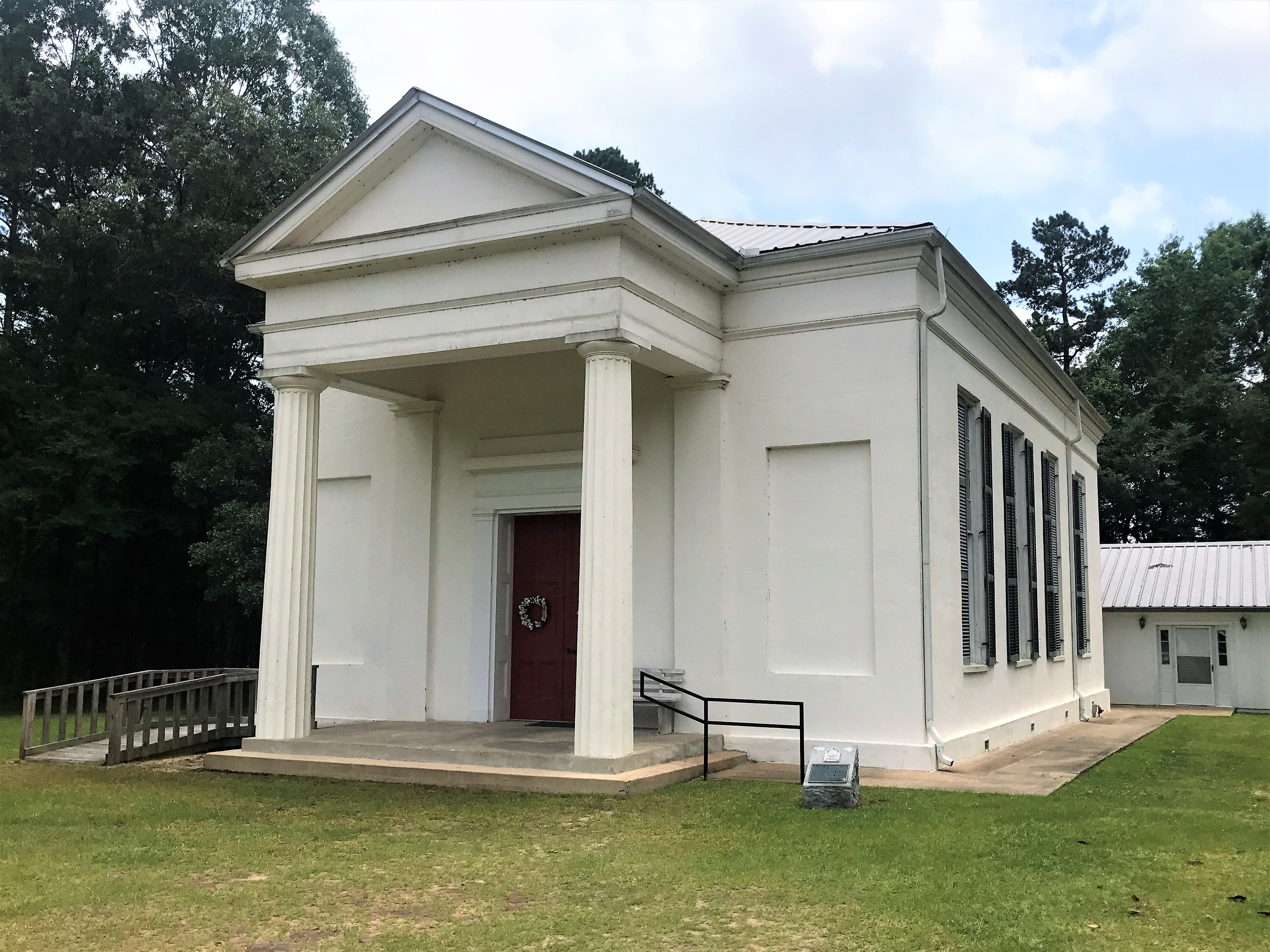

- Location within Mississippi Location within the United States
- Nearest city: Natchez, Mississippi
- Coordinates: 31°23′21″N 91°16′43″W
- Area: 8 acres (3.2 ha)
- Built: 1856
- Architectural style: Greek Revival
- NRHP reference No.: 82003093
- Added to NRHP: May 13, 1982

Kingston Methodist Church is a historic church in Kingston, Mississippi.

It was built in 1856 in a Greek Revival style to replace a brick church destroyed by the 1840 Natchez tornado. The building was added to the National Register of Historic Places in 1982.
