= Melanie Sojourner =

American politician

Member of the Mississippi Senate from the 37th district
- In office January 7, 2020 – January 2, 2024
- Preceded by: Bob Dearing
- Succeeded by: Albert Butler (redistricting)
- In office January 3, 2012 – January 5, 2016
- Preceded by: Bob Dearing
- Succeeded by: Bob Dearing

Personal details
- Born: January 5, 1968 (age 58) Centreville, Mississippi, U.S.
- Party: Republican
- Relations: Albert Boyd Sojourner (great-grandfather)
- Education: Louisiana State University
- Website: www.melaniesojourner.com

Melanie Sojourner (born January 5, 1968) is an American politician from the state of Mississippi. She served in the Mississippi State Senate, representing the 37th district. She is a member of the Republican Party.

She was born in Centreville, Mississippi, and was raised in Kingston, Mississippi. She is the great-granddaughter of Albert Boyd Sojourner, who was in the Mississippi House of Representatives in 1916.

She attended Adams County Christian School, which was founded as a segregation academy and uses the Confederate flag as its symbol, and has enrolled her daughter there. She opposed the removal of the Confederate battle flag from the Flag of Mississippi.

Sojourner graduated from Louisiana State University. She then worked for the National Cattlemen's Beef Association for eight years, and then as a 4-H associate for Mississippi State University.

Sojourner defeated Bob Dearing in the 2011 elections to serve in the State Senate. She served as the campaign manager for Chris McDaniel's 2014 U.S. Senate campaign. Sojourner lost her reelection bid to Dearing in the 2015 elections. She was elected back to the Senate in the 2019 elections.

Sojourner's legislative district was effectively dismantled during 2022 redistricting and she ultimately did not seek re-election to the Senate in 2023.
