= Sojourn Music =

As a musical collective, Sojourn Music consists of a group of musicians with backgrounds in jazz, country, and pop who came together with musicians from indie and punk rock backgrounds. Sojourn creates new songs for modern missionary worship, rich in Christian teaching and contextualized in modern culture. Contemporary hymns, psalms, and songs of lament and praise are written by members of the Louisville-based Sojourn Collective.

== Sojourn Collective ==
Sojourn Collective is a family of local churches in Louisville, Kentucky, and southern Indiana. Over the years, Sojourn Music has recorded multiple records of original music, and has led worship at national conferences for Advance The Church, The Resurgence, Acts 29, The Gospel Coalition, and Campus Crusade for Christ.

== History ==
Sojourn Music is part of the worship arts ministry of Sojourn Collective, along with Sojourn Visual Arts. Sojourn Church launched in 2000 with under 100 people, most of whom were in their early 20s, and many of whom were participants or patrons of Louisville's independent arts scene. This included founding member Mike Cosper, a multi-instrumentalist who became Sojourn's Pastor of Worship & Arts.

Cosper and many of his volunteer worship leaders and musicians played in music venues around Louisville as members of various local bands, then came together on Sundays to lead worship at Sojourn Church services. They recorded their first album in 2001: a live album featuring covers of modern worship songs titled The Reverence And The Noise.

Local worshipers bought all of the limited number of physical copies created. Due to copyright issues, Sojourn Music didn't produce additional copies or make the album available through digital distribution.

A year later they recorded their first album of original music, With The Angels. This ten-song album featured the vocals of Sojourn worship leader Jeremy Quillo, who wrote all songs except for "Come Thou Fount". Band member Eddy Morris and Cosper engineered and produced With The Angels at Morris's Ear Candy Studio – a pattern repeated for the next three Sojourn studio recordings._

Following a Christmas season record in 2003, Songs For The Advent, Cosper, Quillo, Morris and Sojourn musicians began recording a Psalm-based record which delved into several folk musical styles both American and international. While Quillo still sang and wrote songs for the album, entitled These Things I Remember, fellow worship leader Rebecca Dennison led half the songs and contributed music she wrote both independently and with Cosper. Sojourn released These Things I Remember in early 2005, dedicating it to Sojourn member Aaron Marrs, a graphic artist and film-maker whose ship was lost at sea that year. Marrs had designed the artwork for many Gotee Records albums.

By 2006, Sojourn songwriters were formally meeting together, collaborating and critiquing each other's worship songs.

Near the end of the year Cosper met with Sojourn Visual Arts Director, Michael Winters, songwriter Bobby Gilles (who led the monthly songwriting workshops) and worship leader Lorie Spann to brainstorm ideas for harnessing the creative efforts of Sojourn visual artists and songwriters for a Calvin Institute of Worship grant project called "Vertical Habits". The Institute's goal was to encourage grant recipients to come up with creative ways to teach worship liturgy and theology as a conversation with God.

Sojourn's resulting project was a ten-song album, ten-piece art project, and corresponding devotional, all entitled Before The Throne. The songs and art pieces follow the linear movement of a Christian worship service liturgy, from the Call To Worship to the Benediction. The album featured over 20 participants, the largest-ever cast of Sojourn Music songwriters, musicians and singers.

Just prior to Before The Throne’s release in August 2007, Cosper and Gilles created sojournmusic.com as a way to sell CDs online. Gilles operated as content manager, blogging about worship leading, liturgy, songwriting and Sojourn-related news, including content from Cosper’s sermons, writings and conference lectures on faith & art.

In October 2007, Christianity Today Online published a 5-star review of Before The Throne, which was followed by similarly positive reviews in several major Christian websites and blogs, driving sales of Before The Throne as well as traffic to sojournmusic.com. "In The Shadow Of The Glorious Cross" became Sojourn's most-covered song by church worship teams across the country. Other songs from Before The Throne to be often covered include "My Maker And My King", "All I Have Is Yours", "We Are Listening", "There Is A Peace", and "Lead Us Back".

Sojourn responded to the newfound demand for their worship songs by re-recording Songs For The Advent, including new material and the musical contributions of newer members. They called the reformulated album Advent Songs, and it garnered positive mentions in the Christian blogging community as well as Louisville's major newspaper, the Courier Journal, and airplay on Louisville radio station WFPK for songs "Glory Be" and covers of Christmas standards "O Come All Ye Faithful" and "Joy To The World".

In 2008, Cosper began conversations with record producer/independent musician Neil Degraide on a new project. Cosper wanted to "rewrite the hymnal" of Isaac Watts, an 18th-century pastor and poet often described as the "Father Of English Hymnody".

They decided to record two full albums of songs adapted from or inspired by the hymns of Watts. Degraide would produce one album, and Cosper would helm the second one, an Americana record.

Sojourn released the rock album, Over The Grave: The Hymns Of Isaac Watts, Volume 1, in 2009. Continuing the trend of using an ever-wider community of artists, Over The Grave featured the lead vocals of six members, and many musicians, as well as eleven songwriters and nine different songwriting collaborations.

This album marked the first time a Sojourn single appeared on a Worship Leader SongSelect compilation CD ("Refuge") or received significant internet radio airplay ("Warrior"). It also marked the first time a Sojourn record appeared on iTunes’ Top Twenty downloads list of Christian albums.

In 2010, Cosper decided to record the second Watts volume at White Arc Studios with producer Paul Mahern, whose production/engineering credits include music by John Mellencamp, Over The Rhine, and many other artists. He scheduled studio time for early 2011.

Cosper decided to record two EPs and package them together. These EPs featured the vocals and songwriting of two Louisville artists who had joined Cosper's salaried staff as Worship Directors of Sojourn Church campuses: Jamie Barnes, who entitled his EP The Mercy Seat, and Brooks Ritter, who called his The War. Sojourn released these EPs in February 2011. Each immediately climbed into the iTunes Top Ten Christian downloads, and the song "Absent From Flesh" quickly became one of Sojourn's top-selling singles.

Sojourn recorded The Water And The Blood: The Hymns Of Isaac Watts, Volume Two over the span of one weekend at Mahern's studio. They played live and recorded to analog tape. When Sojourn released it on Good Friday, 2011, it became their longest-running Top Ten Christian album download. It was also the first Sojourn product to be released on vinyl, in a two-LP collectors edition. Like Over The Grave, this closing volume of the Isaac Watts project featured a large cast of musicians and many songwriting collaborations, including members who had been involved since The Reverence And The Noise days as well as some who had joined the community after the release of Over The Grave. The Water And The Blood became the most widely reviewed Sojourn record to date, gaining positive reviews in CCM Magazine, Christianity Today, leading Christian blogs as well as Americana and folk music websites.

During the 2011 season of Advent and Christmas, Sojourn released A Child is Born, featuring recordings of classic hymns, Sojourn originals, and covers of songs written by other artists. On Good Friday, 2012, Sojourn recorded a live album at Louisville's Memorial Auditorium. The album was released as Come Ye Sinners on November 20, 2012, and again featured a mixture of Sojourn originals (some appearing for the first time) and covers.

From the beginning, Sojourn has believed songs for worship should run the gamut of human emotion, including expressions of grief—much like the psalms of the Bible—and all of God's attributes, including wrath. They have resisted drawing lines between "Christian" and "secular" music, and have been influenced by everything from the psalms of David to the great hymns of the Reformation, and artists of the 20th and 21st centuries like Thelonious Monk, Muddy Waters, Bessie Smith, Hank Williams, Johnny Cash, The Beatles, Bob Dylan, Bruce Springsteen, Radiohead, Elbow, Over The Rhine, Wilco and U2.

== Accolades ==
The song, "New Again", was placed at No. 19 on the Worship Leader Top 20 Songs of 2015 list.

== Discography ==
- With The Angels (2002)
- Songs for the Advent (2002)
- These Things I Remember (2005)
- Before The Throne (2007)
- Advent Songs (Christmas Album) (2007)
- Over The Grave (2009)
- Split EP: The Mercy Seat & The War (2011)
- The Water And The Blood (2011)
- A Child Is Born (Christmas Album) (2011)
- Come Ye Sinners (Live Album) (2012)
- New Again (2015)
- PROOF Pirates (Children's Album) (2015)
