= Belyllioth =

- Belyllioth, art by Ed Benes.

Publication information
- Publisher: DC Comics
- First appearance: Artemis: Requiem #1 (June 1996)
- Created by: William Messner-Loebs (writer); Ed Benes (artist)

In-story information
- Species: Demon
- Place of origin: Hell
- Team affiliations: Amazons; Tartarus
- Abilities: Magic; Sharp claws; Control of 1/13th of Hell's demons

Belyllioth is a fictional demon published by DC Comics. She debuted in Artemis: Requiem #1 (June 1996), and was created by William Messner-Loebs and Ed Benes.

== Fictional character biography ==
Belyllioth started as a demon General living in the portion of Hell ruled over by the demon Dalkriig-Hath. When Wonder Woman entered this realm looking for her fallen sister Artemis, Belyllioth attempted to capture the intruder. Failing to do so, Dalkriig-Hath saw this as a failure and planned on publicly humiliating her by torture as an example to the other demons who may fail in their tasks. During this time though Dalkriig-Hath's newest bride Artemis and Wonder Woman were watching the public spectacle from a nearby building.

Diana managed to stop the executioner from torturing Belyllioth but was soon made a victim herself by the large number of demons faithful to Dalkriig-Hath. Artemis then joined the fight by freeing Belyllioth from her shackles, allowing her and her loyal Myrmidon demons to take part in the battle also. Grateful to Artemis and Diana for freeing her, Belyllioth held back Dalkriig-Hath's forces until they could safely escape. Following their example, Belyllioth and her minions retreated to safety also.

Opting to bide her time and accumulate more demons to help her gain revenge against Dalkriig-Hath, Belyllioth was surprised to discover that a few months after their escape that Artemis had managed to kill Dalkriig-Hath in the mortal world. She thanked Artemis and quickly tried to assume lordship of the realm. Artemis' only stipulation for not standing in Belyllioth's way from doing so was that Belyllioth release the souls of 5 members of the demon hunting group The Hellenders who had died battling Dalkriig-Hath and the life of a woman who had committed suicide and her daughter. She agreed and they were given life again.

Belyllioth soon discovered though that holding on to her newfound title would be hard to do. The remaining 12 Princes of Hell had also discovered that Dalkriig-Hath had been destroyed and each tried to take over his portion of hell for themselves. This caused a huge war to take place that seemed to be a losing battle.

Artemis agrees to aid Belyllioth. Art by Ed Benes.

Realizing that as Dalkriig-Hath's widow Artemis was by rights entitled to become his replacement as ruler, Belyllioth traveled to the mortal realm seeking Artemis' aid. Artemis agreed to help Belyllioth's forces as the Underworld battle caused serious after effects in the mortal world. Telling Belyllioth that she did not want to rule her dead husband's realm, Artemis hatched a plan.

Disguised as Artemis, Belyllioth presented herself before the 12 Princes of Hell demanding that she be allowed rule. They grudgingly accepted and magically gave her all rights to the title of the 13th Prince of Hell. After the ceremony was ended Belyllioth revealed her true form, which angered the 12 other rulers. As they could not refute their established blessing, they were forced to accept Belyllioth as a fellow ruler.

They did promise Artemis though that for her treachery that they would seek revenge against her if she should ever enter Hell again. Fortunately for her, Belyllioth now considers Artemis to be a great ally for helping her get the 13th throne and will help protect her when needed.

== Powers and abilities ==
Belyllioth is now a high-ranking demon lord, commanding 1/13th of the demons of hell. She is also a sorcerer and warrior.

== Bibliography ==
- Artemis: Requiem mini-series (1996)
- Wonder Woman Annual (vol. 2) #6 (1997)
