= Bob Dearing =

American politician (1935–2020)

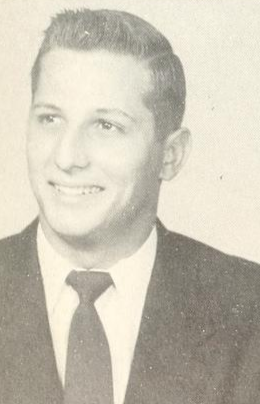

Member of the Mississippi Senate
- In office January 20, 2016 – January 7, 2020
- Preceded by: Melanie Sojourner
- Succeeded by: Melanie Sojourner
- Constituency: 38th district (1980–1981); 37th district (1981–2012; 2016–2019)
- In office January 1980 – January 2012
- Succeeded by: Melanie Sojourner (37th district)

Personal details
- Born: January 26, 1935 Natchez, Mississippi, U.S.
- Died: July 30, 2020 (aged 85) Natchez, Mississippi, U.S.
- Party: Democratic
- Spouse: Shelley Paige Ditzler
- Children: 3
- Education: Delta State University (BS); University of Southern Mississippi (MEd)
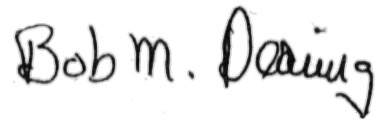
- Signature

Military service
- Branch/service: United States Army; Mississippi National Guard
- Years of service: 1958–1964

Robert Montgomery Dearing (January 26, 1935 – July 30, 2020) was an American politician, educator, and businessman who served in the Mississippi Senate as a member of the Democratic Party.

Dearing grew up in Natchez, Mississippi, and graduated from Delta State University and the University of Southern Mississippi. In the 1970s he became active in politics with unsuccessful campaigns for a seat on the Adams County Board of Supervisors. In 1979, he was elected to the Mississippi Senate until he was defeated by Melanie Sojourner, but Dearing would later defeat Sojourner and decided to not run for reelection.

== Early life and education ==
Robert Montgomery Dearing was born on January 26, 1935, in Natchez, Mississippi, to Weenonah Montgomery and Robert V. Dearing. He graduated from Natchez High School. From 1958 to 1961, Dearing served in the Mississippi National Guard, from 1961 to 1962, he served in the United States Army, and served in the national guard again from 1962 to 1964.

From 1953 to 1957, he attended Delta State Teachers College and graduated with a Bachelor of Science in education, and graduated from the University of Southern Mississippi with a master's degree in school administration in 1965. From 1958 to 1964, he taught and coached in the Natchez public school system and was an elementary principal from 1965 to 1966.

In 1966, Dearing was named as Outstanding Young Man of the Year by the Natchez Jaycees. In 1997, Dearing was named as the Outstanding Alumnus of 1997 by Delta State University.

Dearing married Shelley Paige Ditzler, with whom he had three children.

== Career ==
=== Local politics ===
In 1971, Dearing ran for a seat on the Adams County Board of Supervisors from the 2nd district, but was defeated by A. Boyd Sojourner. He was defeated by Sojourner again in 1975. (Sojourner's granddaughter Melanie Sojourner would later defeat Dearing in the 2011 election for the state Senate.) In 1981, he was elected to a three-year term on the Delta State University Foundation Board of Directors.

=== Mississippi Senate ===
==== Elections ====
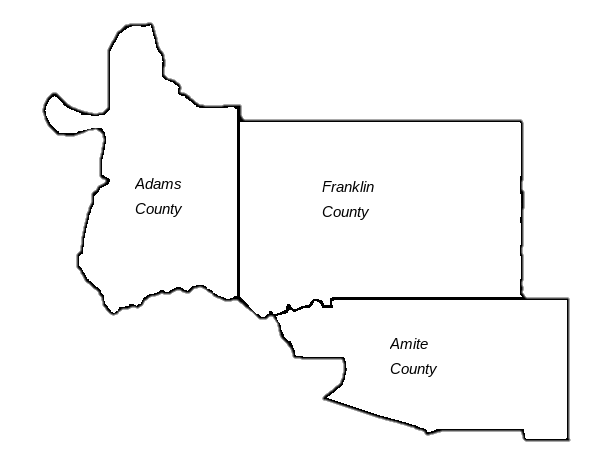
The 37th district from 1991 to 2001

On August 7, 1979, Dearing won the Democratic nomination for a seat in the Mississippi Senate from the 38th district and won in the general election.

In 1983, he won reelection against Republican nominee Jack Templeton in the 37th district. In 1987, he won reelection. In 1991, he won reelection without opposition. In 1995, he defeated Charles Ravencraft in the Democratic primary and Republican nominee Erle Drane in the general election. In 1999, he defeated Scott Pintard in the Democratic primary and won reelection without opposition in the general election. In 2003, and 2007, he won reelection without opposition.

During the 2011 elections Dearing started with no money in his campaign war chest as the $5,800 he raised during 2010 was spent by the end of that year. In the general election he was defeated by Republican nominee Melanie Sojourner.

In 2015, Dearing ran against Sojourner and narrowly defeated her with 8,218 to 8,154 votes. Sojourner claimed that there were illegalities and irregularities with the election and attempted to have the Mississippi Senate vote to seat her instead of Dearing. On January 18, 2016, the Mississippi Senate voted 47 to 3 to seat Dearing and he was inaugurated on the same day.

On January 3, 2019, Dearing announced that he would not seek reelection. Sojourner won in the election to succeed Dearing and took office on January 7, 2020.

==== Tenure ====
In 1984, Dearing was appointed to serve as the vice chairman of the Corrections committee. In 1988, he was appointed to serve as the chairman of the Municipalities committee. In 1992, he was appointed to serve as the chairman of the Forestry committee. In 1993, he was appointed to serve as chairman of the Fees and Salaries committee. In 1996, he was appointed to serve as chairman of the Environmental Protection, Conservation and Water Resources committee and as a member of the Performance Evaluation and Expenditure Review committee. In 2000, he was appointed to serve as the chairman of the Highways and Transportation committee. In 2004, he was appointed to serve as the chairman of the Oil, Gas and Other Minerals committee.

In 1997, Dearing was appointed to the Southern States Energy Board by Lieutenant Governor Ronnie Musgrove.

During the 2008–2011 session of the Mississippi Senate, he served on the Economic Development, Finance, Highways and Transportation, Insurance, Public Health and Welfare, Oil, Gas and Other Minerals, and Wildlife, Fisheries and Parks committees. In 2016, he was appointed to serve as the vice chairman of the Public Property committee.

== Death ==
Dearing died in Natchez, Mississippi, on July 30, 2020, at the age of 85. On August 8, he will be buried in the Natchez City Cemetery.

== Political positions and legislation ==
In 1980, Dearing was one of four state senators, including Ed Ellington, Wayne Burkes, and Howard Dyer, to receive a 100% rating from the League of Women Voters. In 1984, he wrote a resolution, which was unanimously supported by the Mississippi Senate and House of Representatives, requesting CBS to not cancel The Mississippi, a television show which was filmed in Natchez. On January 16, 1997, the Mississippi Senate voted 38 to 12, with Dearing in favor, in favor of Motor Voter legislation.

=== Animals ===
In 2006, Dearing introduced legislation, which was passed by the legislature, that would amend Mississippi's animal cruelty law to include cats as the current law only criminalized cruelty against dogs. During his tenure in the Mississippi Senate he proposed legislation that would make animal cruelty a felony offense on the third instance, as under the current law only dog fighting or intentional poisoning could be punished with felony charges.

In 2010, Dearing introduced legislation that would prohibit deer hunting with dogs in the Homochitto National Forest, but the legislation died in the Wildlife, Fisheries and Parks committee.

=== Gambling ===
In 1990, Dearing introduced legislation that would allow riverboat gambling along the Mississippi River. On February 2, the Mississippi Senate voted 23 to 21 in favor of the legislation, and the House Ways and Means committee voted to advance the bill on February 22. On March 7, the Mississippi House of Representatives voted 66 to 52 in favor of an amended version of the legislation which was approved by the Mississippi Senate, by a vote of 22 to 20. On March 20, Governor Ray Mabus signed the legislation into law and riverboat gambling became legal in Mississippi on April 1.

=== Religion ===
In 1987, Dearing co-sponsored a resolution asking for the United States Congress to pass a constitutional amendment to allow prayer in schools.

On March 30, 1994, the Mississippi Senate voted 41 to 9, with Dearing in favor, in favor of legislation that would allow prayer at school and school events only if the prayer was initiated by students.

=== Taxation ===
In 1990, Dearing, Barbara Blanton, Buddy Bond, and Bill Renick introduced legislation that would increase the sales tax from 6¢ to 7¢ and use the 1¢ increase to pay for an education reform bill. The Mississippi Senate voted 28 to 22 in favor of the legislation.

On March 6, 1995, the Mississippi Senate voted 30 to 15, with Dearing against, in favor of a constitutional amendment that would prohibit courts in Mississippi from forcing tax increases. During the 1995 elections the ballot initiative, under the name Amendment Number One, was approved.

In 2006, the Mississippi Senate voted 36 to 15, with Dearing voting in favor, in favor of legislation that would raise the cigarette tax from 18 to 75 on July 1, 2006, and then to $1 on July 1, 2007. The legislation also decreased the 7% sales tax on groceries by 2.5% on July 1, 2006, then by 1% on July 1, 2007, and then by 0.5% every year until 2014. However, Governor Haley Barbour vetoed the legislation. On March 29, the Mississippi Senate voted 29 to 20, with Dearing voting in favor, in favor of overriding Barbour's veto, but was four votes short.

== Electoral history ==
1983 Mississippi Senate 37th district election
Party	Candidate	Votes	%
Democratic	Bob Dearing (incumbent)	9,050	87.95%
Republican	Jack Templeton	1,240	12.05%
Total votes		10,290	100.00%

1995 Mississippi Senate 37th district election
Primary election
Party	Candidate	Votes	%
Democratic	Bob Dearing (incumbent)	11,756	72.59%
Democratic	Charles Ravencraft	4,438	27.41%
Total votes		16,194	100.00%
General election
Democratic	Bob Dearing (incumbent)	11,448	66.06%
Republican	Erle Drane	5,881	33.94%
Total votes		17,329	100.00%

1999 Mississippi Senate 37th district Democratic primary
Party	Candidate	Votes	%
Democratic	Bob Dearing (incumbent)	9,495	69.19%
Democratic	Scott Pintard	4,229	30.81%
Total votes		13,724	100.00%

2003 Mississippi Senate 37th district election
Party	Candidate	Votes	%
Democratic	Bob Dearing (incumbent)	18,288	100.00%
Total votes		18,288	100.00%

2007 Mississippi Senate 37th district election
Primary election
Party	Candidate	Votes	%
Democratic	Bob Dearing (incumbent)	10,817	64.51%
Democratic	William S. Guy	5,951	35.49%
Total votes		16,768	100.00%
General election
Democratic	Bob Dearing (incumbent)	14,722	100.00%
Total votes		14,722	100.00%

2011 Mississippi Senate 37th district election
Primary election
Party	Candidate	Votes	%
Democratic	Bob Dearing (incumbent)	10,340	100.00%
Total votes		10,340	100.00%
General election
Republican	Melanie Sojourner	10,272	51.14%
Democratic	Bob Dearing (incumbent)	9,814	48.86%
Total votes		20,086	100.00%

2015 Mississippi Senate 37th district election
Primary election
Party	Candidate	Votes	%
Democratic	Bob Dearing	6,816	58.04%
Democratic	Etta Batteaste-Taplin	4,927	41.96%
Total votes		11,743	100.00%
General election
Democratic	Bob Dearing	8,218	50.20%
Republican	Melanie Sojourner (incumbent)	8,154	49.80%
Total votes		16,372	100.00%
