= First Presbyterian Church of Rumson =

Historic church in New Jersey, United States

- First Presbyterian Church of Oceanic
- U.S. National Register of Historic Places
- New Jersey Register of Historic Places
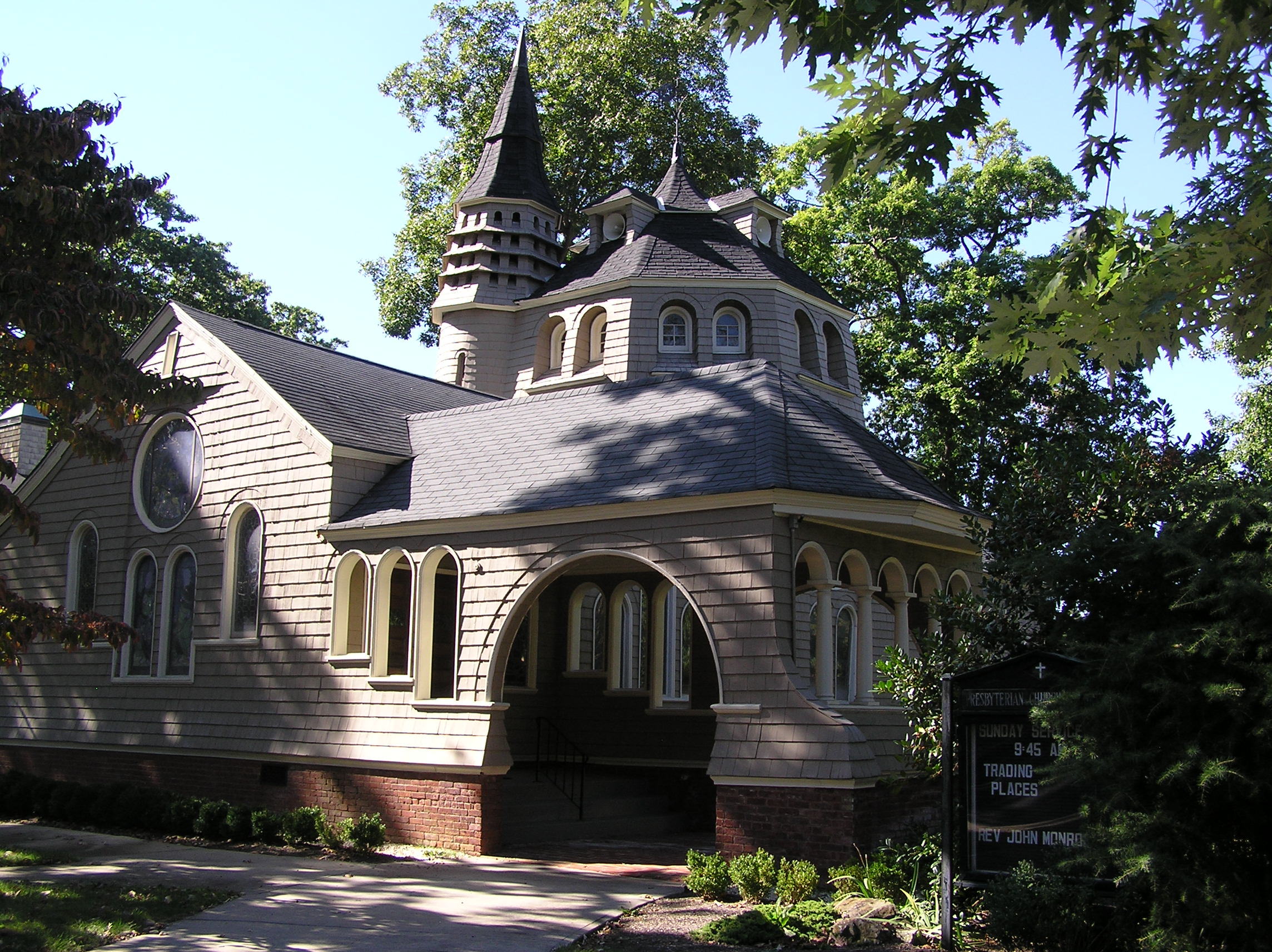

- Location within Monmouth County, New Jersey Location within New Jersey Location within the United States
- Location: 4 E. River Rd., Rumson, New Jersey
- Coordinates: 40°22′34″N 74°00′35″W
- Area: 2 acres (0.81 ha)
- Built: 1885
- Architect: Thomas Hastings
- Architectural style: Shingle Style
- NRHP reference No.: 09000132
- NJRHP No.: 4272

Significant dates
- Added to NRHP: February 4, 2009
- Designated NJRHP: January 5, 2009

First Presbyterian Church of Rumson, also known as the First Presbyterian Church of Oceanic, is a historic church in Rumson, Monmouth County, New Jersey, United States. The church was built in 1886 in shingle-style by renowned architects Carrère and Hastings, who later built famous buildings such as the New York Public Library. The church contains unique architectural elements, such as a hipped roof, octagonal tower, round arched windows, thousands of cedar fish-scale shingles, and three authentic Tiffany windows.

The original church, now Bingham Hall, was built in 1842. The Rev. Professor Thomas S. Hastings, a frequent preacher and president of Union Theological Seminary, conducted the dedication of the new building. His son, Thomas Hastings, designed the church. The building was added to the National Register of Historic Places in 2010.

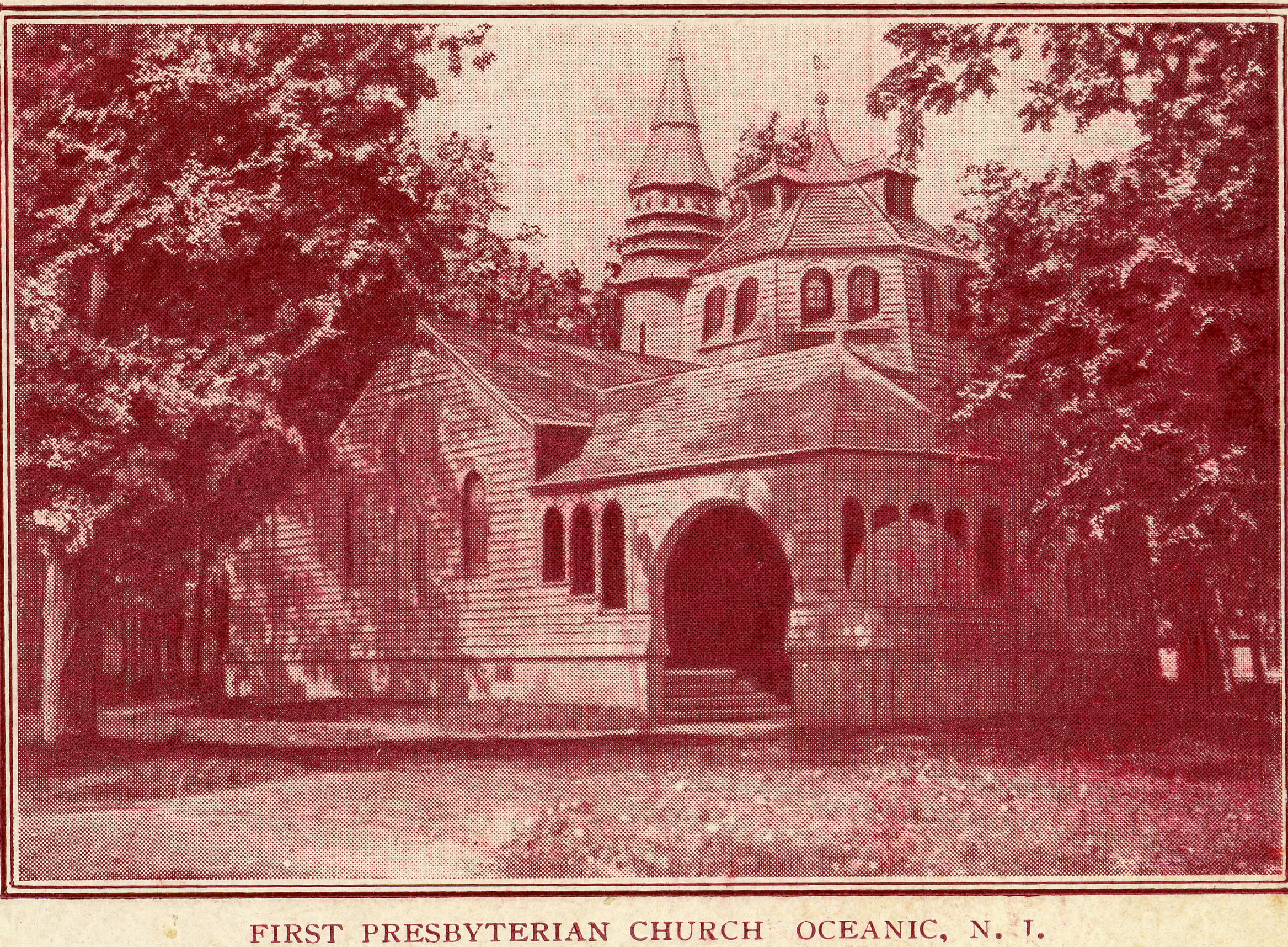
Early postcard
