= Carrère and Hastings =

American architecture firm

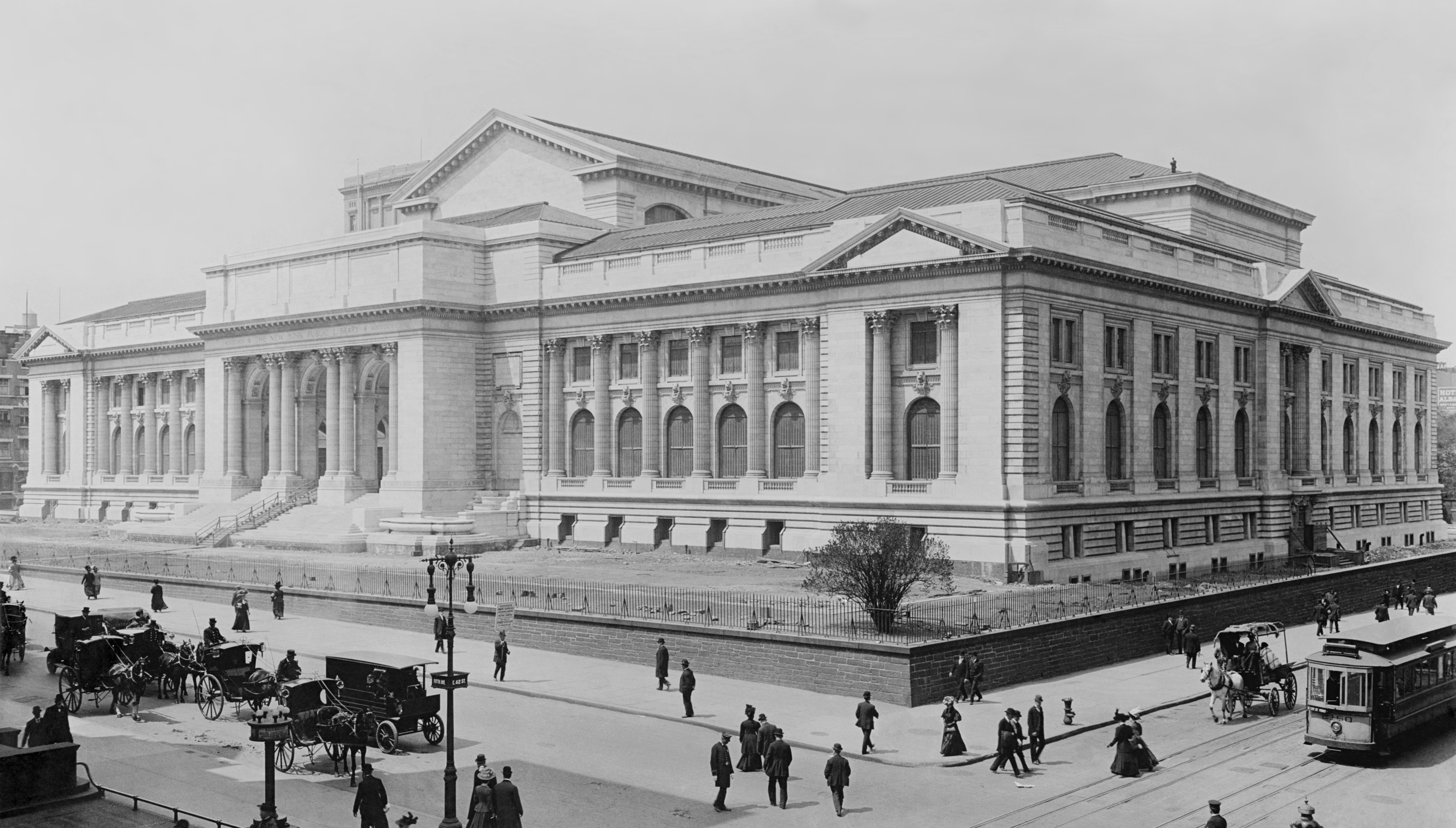
The New York Public Library Main Branch, built 1897–1911, Carrère and Hastings, architects. Photographed during late construction in 1908.

Carrère and Hastings, the firm of John Merven Carrère (/kəˈrɛər/ kə-RAIR; November 9, 1858 – March 1, 1911) and Thomas Hastings (March 11, 1860 – October 22, 1929), was an American architecture firm specializing in Beaux-Arts architecture. Located in New York City, the firm practiced from 1885 until 1929, although Hastings practiced alone after Carrère died in an automobile accident in 1911.

Both men studied at the École nationale supérieure des Beaux-Arts in France and worked at the firm of McKim, Mead and White before they established their firm. The partnership's first success was the Ponce de León Hotel in St. Augustine, Florida, designed for Henry Flagler. They went on to establish a successful practice during the 1880s and early 1890s, and rose to national prominence by winning the competition for the New York Public Library in 1897. The firm designed commercial buildings, elaborate residences, and prominent public buildings in New York, Washington and as far afield as Toronto, London, Paris, Rome, and Havana.

== Carrère ==
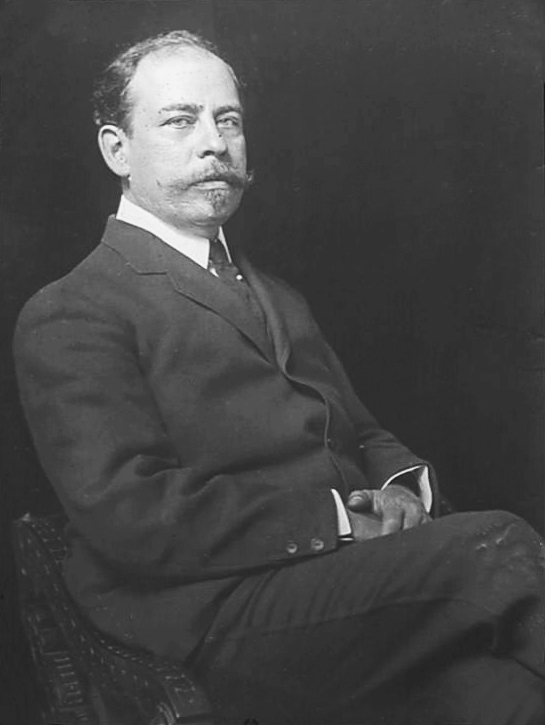
John Merven Carrère

John Merven Carrère was born in Rio de Janeiro, Brazil, the son of John Merven Carrère, a Baltimore native and Anna Louisa Maxwell, a Scots/Brazilian native of Rio who was the daughter of Joseph Maxwell, a prosperous coffee trader. The architect's father entered Maxwell's coffee business and later developed other business interests of his own in Brazil. As a boy Carrère was sent to Switzerland for his education until 1880, when he entered the École nationale supérieure des Beaux-Arts, Paris, where he was in the atelier of Leon Ginian until 1882. He returned to New York where his family had resettled after leaving Brazil and worked as draughtsmen for the architectural firm of McKim, Mead and White. He and his Paris acquaintance, Thomas Hastings, worked there together before striking out on their own in 1885. During this period Carrère independently designed several circular panorama buildings in New York and Chicago. After he married Marion Dell in 1886, they lived on Staten Island and had three daughters, one of whom died as an infant. In 1901 they moved to East 65th Street in Manhattan and built a country house in Harrison, New York.

Carrère was most active in the firm's large civic and commercial projects, including the House and Senate office buildings on Capitol Hill, the Manhattan Bridge and its approaches, and the New York Public Library Main Branch. He was interested in civic affairs in New York, where, with the help of Elihu Root, he helped establish the Art Commission of New York City. Later his public service extended to the national arena. In the 1890s he worked with other leaders of the American Institute of Architects to persuade the US Treasury Department to implement the Tarsney Act, which had been passed by Congress in 1893 to allow the federal government to award architectural commissions for its buildings through open design competitions. During the extended Tarsney controversy, Jeremiah O'Rourke, the Supervising Architect of the Treasury Department, resigned. Carrère was offered the job, an offer he very publicly considered but ultimately declined, writing, "the system, not the man, should be changed."

Carrère was engaged in the development of city planning in the United States. He wrote pamphlets and lectured at universities and to civic groups on the subject. He collaborated with Daniel H. Burnham and Arnold Brunner on the Group Plan for Cleveland, Ohio (1903), and again with Brunner on a plan for Grand Rapids, Michigan (1909). Then, in 1910, he worked with Brunner and Frederick Law Olmsted Jr. on a plan for a Baltimore civic center (1910). In 1908, Carrère was elected into the National Academy of Design as an Associate member, and became a full member in 1910. Later, Carrère and Hastings produced a plan for the City of Hartford, Connecticut, which was completed in 1911, just prior to his death, which occurred when a streetcar collided with the taxi in which he was riding. He suffered a brain concussion and never regained consciousness.

== Hastings ==
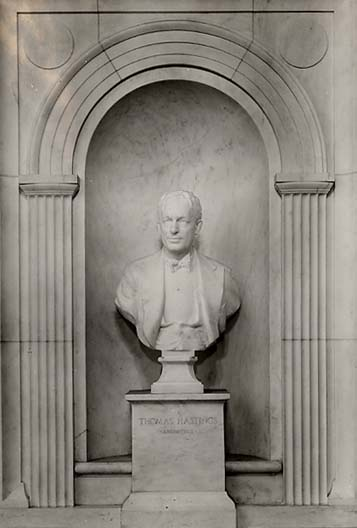
Bust of Thomas Hastings, New York Public Library

Thomas S. Hastings was born in New York City on March 11, 1860. His father, also Thomas S. Hastings (1827–1911), was a noted Presbyterian minister, homiletics professor, and dean of the Union Theological Seminary. His grandfather, Thomas Samuel Hastings (1784–1872), was one of America's leading church musicians of the 19th century: he composed hymns, including 'Rock of Ages,' and published the first musical treatise by a native-born composer in 1822. Hastings was educated in private schools in New York, and began his architectural apprenticeship at Herter Brothers, the premier New York furnishers and decorators. He attended the École nationale supérieure des Beaux-Arts in Paris from 1880 to 1883 as a student in the atelier of Louis-Jules André. There he met his future partner, and both maintained ties to Europe throughout their lives (Hastings earning the French Legion of Honor as well as the Gold Medal of the RIBA).

Upon returning to New York, Hastings entered the office of McKim, Mead & White, the leading American firm of the American Renaissance. Renewing his friendship with Carrère, who was also in the office, he remained there for two years. A referral through his father to Henry Morrison Flagler resulted in the commission first for a library extension to Flagler's Mamaroneck estate and then for the Ponce de Leon and later Alcazar hotels in St. Augustine, Florida. Further ties to wealthy patrons, who were also members of his father's mid-town congregation, propelled the rapid success of the young architects. His brother Frank's ties to E. C. Benedict, a leading financier, introduced him not only to patrons but also to his future wife. In 1900, at the age of 40, he married Benedict's daughter Helen at the Presbyterian church in Greenwich, Connecticut. The ceremony was attended by many of New York's wealthy citizens. Charles F. McKim was the best man, Stanford White designed the church decorations, and White's son was a page.

Hastings is credited with many of the firm's designs and, in part because he survived Carrère by eighteen years, he is the often cited as the leader of the firm. He lectured widely and wrote a number of influential articles, later collected by David Gray in his brief biography of the architect. He and his wife enjoyed riding, and they built a country house in Old Westbury, Long Island. Following Carrère's death in 1911, Hastings maintained the firm's name and continued his role as principal in the firm, but shared responsibility in large commissions with trusted associates such as Richmond Shreve, Theodore Blake and others. Owen Brainard, an engineer, was a junior partner in the firm during Carrère's lifetime and continued to consult with the firm thereafter. Eventually this collaborative arrangement would result in the formation of Shreve, Lamb and Blake (later Shreve, Lamb and Harmon), the noted builders of skyscrapers.

Hastings died of complications of an appendectomy on October 23, 1929. Some of his papers were given to the American Academy of Arts & Letters, where he was a member and treasurer for many years. He was survived by his wife but left no heirs.

== Collaboration and beyond ==
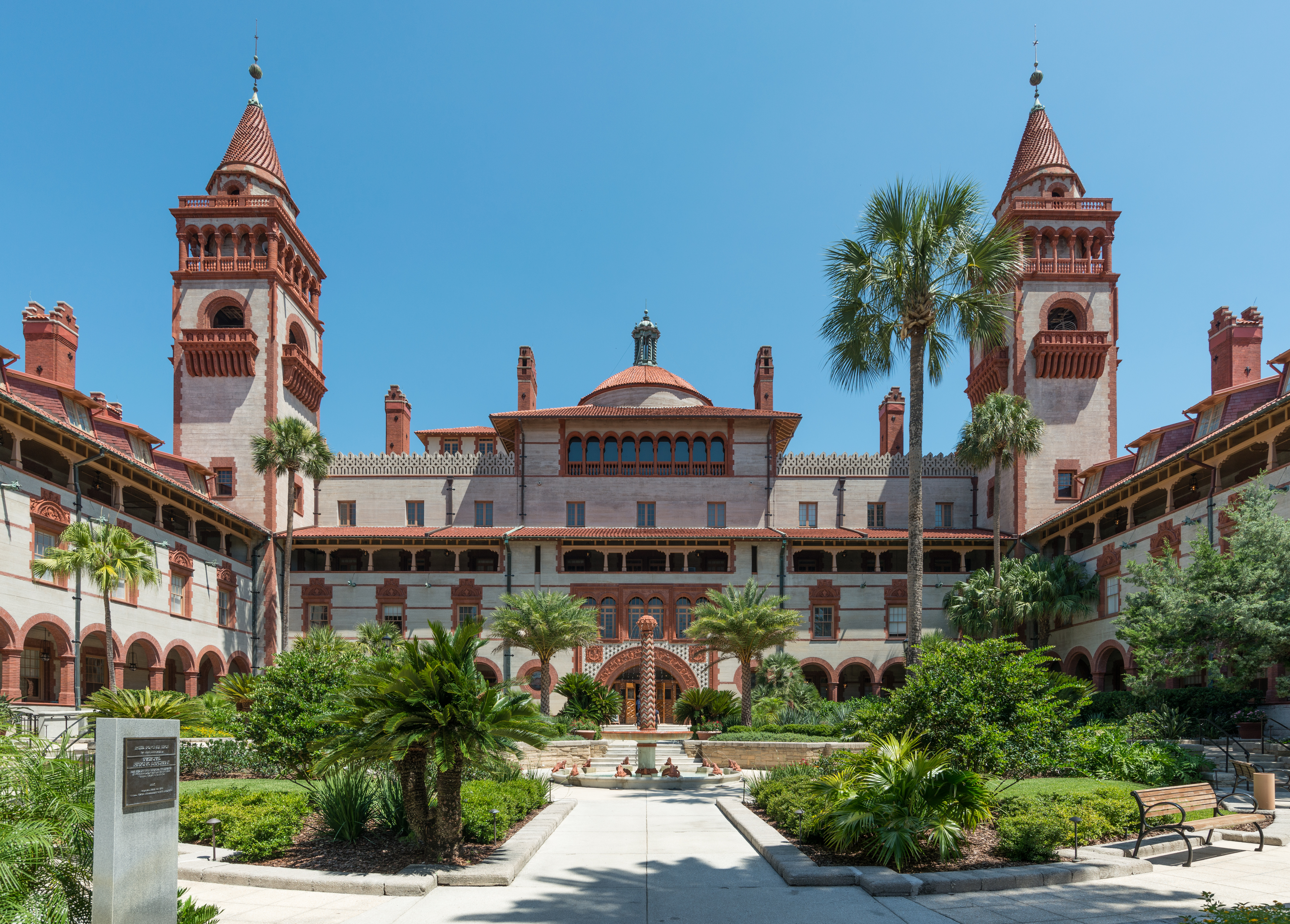
Ponce de Leon Hotel, 1885–88 (now Flagler College)

The firm's first major commission came from a parishioner of Rev. Hastings, Henry Morrison Flagler, the Florida developer and railway tycoon, for whom the partners built the Ponce de León Hotel (1885–1888) in St. Augustine, Florida (now part of Flagler College). This was followed by the Alcazar Hotel (1887–88 now the Lightner Museum), as well as the Flagler Memorial Presbyterian Church (1887), both in St. Augustine, and a house for Henry Flagler nearby. In 1901 they designed a second house for Flagler, Whitehall, in the resort he developed, Palm Beach, Florida. Whitehall was completed in 1902. Whitehall is a Mediterranean-flavored house faced with white stucco, with palatial interiors in various styles ranged round a grand entrance hall with double staircase.

Carrère and Hastings were among the best-connected New York architects, and benefited from associations with the richest and most powerful of the city's citizens. Clients included Elihu Root, the noted attorney and cabinet secretary under Theodore Roosevelt, Edward H. Harriman, the railroad tycoon, Thomas Fortune Ryan, one of Wall Street's notorious capitalists, and several members of the Blair family of New Jersey. The early work of the firm was eclectic but always succinctly organized, an inheritance of their École des Beaux-Arts training. Following the World Columbian Exposition of 1893, and its influential classical themes, the firm's style began to exhibit modern French and Renaissance revival attributes. The attention to sculpture and surface embellishment in their work was always closely tied to the axial planning that ensured the functionality of the interior spaces and circulation. They were among the earliest users of new technologies, from structural steel to electrification, even employing passive air conditioning systems. But their major interest was in the adaptation of the classical language of architecture developed in Europe to the American scene, creating a modern American architecture out of centuries-old traditions.

One of the largest contributions of the firm was in the realm of urban design, a result of Carrère's abiding interest in the Beaux-Arts "City Beautiful" movement. An early advocate of comprehensive planning, he designed downtown plans for Baltimore, Hartford, Cleveland and Atlantic City. In collaboration with Hastings, he was largely responsible for carrying out the firm's major public commissions: the New York Public Library (1897–1912), the House and Senate Office Buildings in Washington (1908–09), the planning of the Pan-American Exposition in Buffalo (1901), the McKinnley Memorial in Buffalo, Richmond Borough Hall on Staten Island (1904–06), and the Paterson (New Jersey) City Hall (1896).

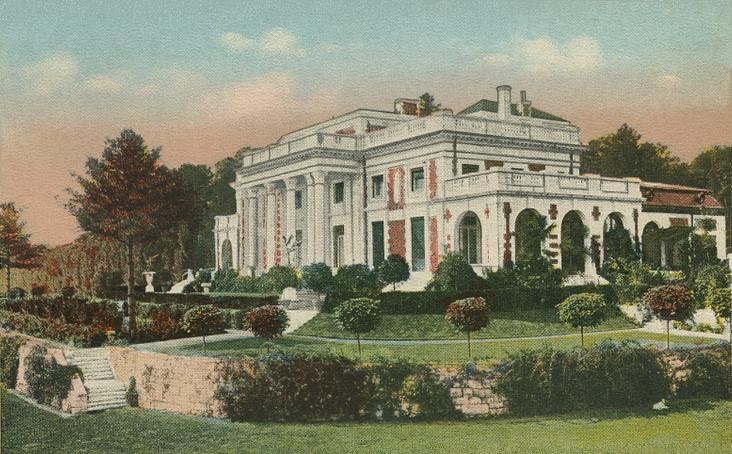
Bellefontaine in 1912

The architects were also noted for their contributions to the country house and garden movement of the early 1900s, where they introduced both stylistic and compositional ideas that shaped domestic architecture for decades to come. Their garden designs were extensively published, and they created a comprehensive staff to handle interior design in large houses, one of the first offices to offer these services. Their largest and most notable country houses included Blairsden (1898) in Peapack, New Jersey, Bellefontaine (1897, altered) in Lenox, Massachusetts, Arden (1905–09) in Harriman, New York, and Nemours (1910) in Wilmington, Delaware.

The office's significant skyscrapers were not designed until the late 1910s and early 1920s when, in association with other architects, Hastings' office worked on the Cunard Building (1917–21) and the Standard Oil Building (1920–28), which stand across the street from each other on Broadway at Bowling Green. Hastings was a critic of tall buildings in cities, warning that buildings over six stories (the height of Parisian hôtels particuliers) produced alienation by removing references to human scale, and destroyed the urban streetscape.

Changing styles and the rise of International Modernism led architectural historians to neglect the work of Carrère and Hastings for half a century after the firm closed. Today the firm is recognized as one of the most important in the U.S. during the late 19th and early 20th centuries. Their contributions to civic design and classicism are of continued importance today.

== Selected works ==
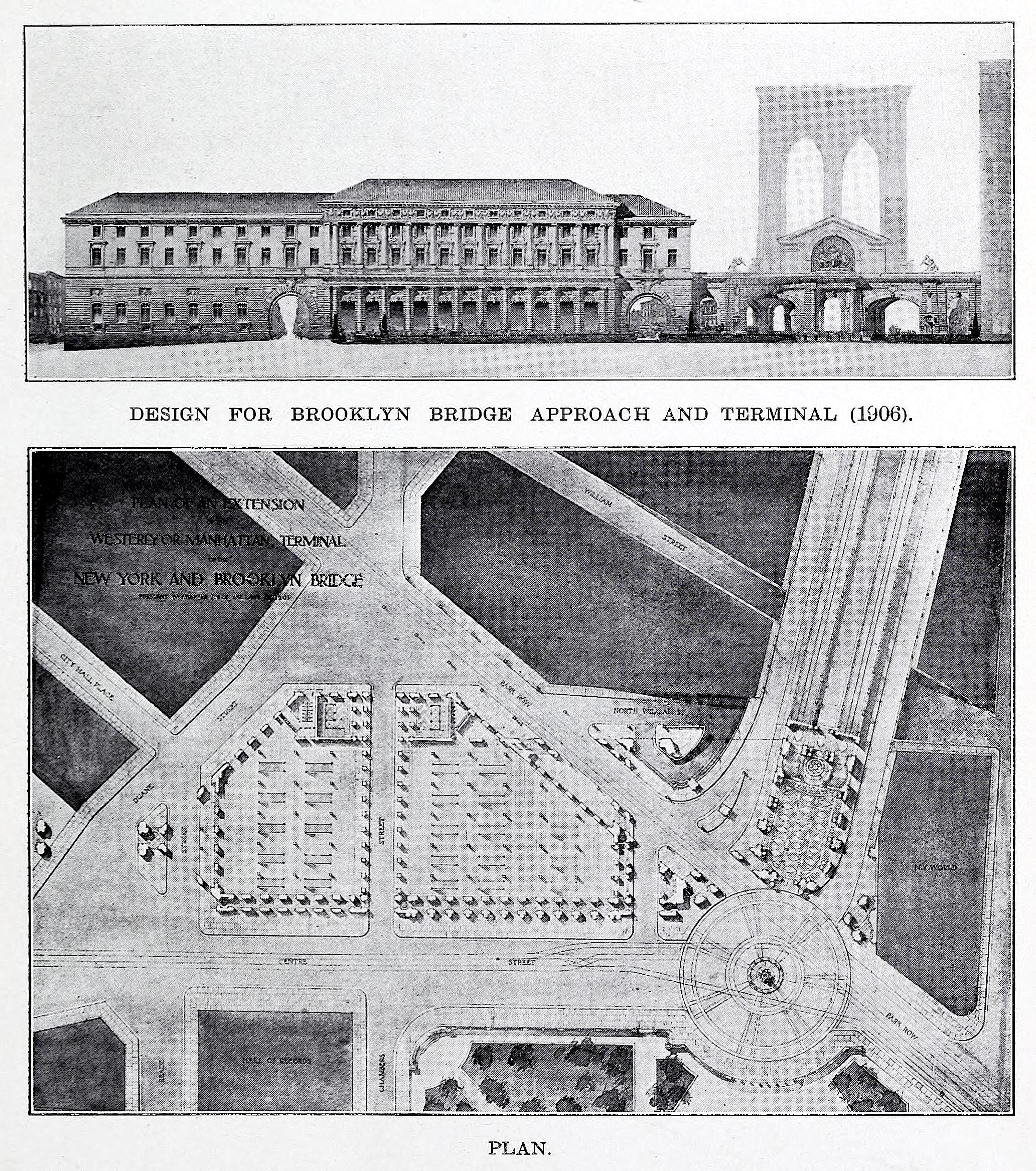
Design for Brooklyn Bridge Approach and Terminal, 1906

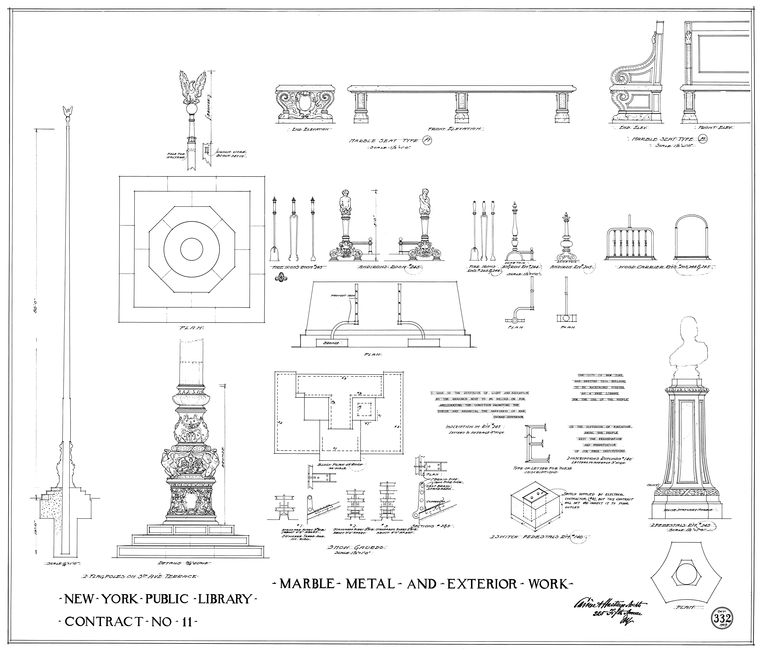
Marble, metal and exterior work. Architectural plans for New York Public Library, 1909

- First Presbyterian Church of Rumson, Rumson, New Jersey, 1886 (this church also has 3 authentic Tiffany windows)
- Ponce de León Hotel, St. Augustine, Florida, 1885–87, now part of Flagler College
- Hotel Alcazar, St. Augustine, Florida, 1887, now the Lightner Museum
- The Commonwealth Club, Richmond, Virginia, 1891
- Edison Building, New York City, 1891 (razed)
- New York Evening Mail, New York City, 1892
- Brookside Park, Tarrytown, New York, 1892
- Central Congregational Church, Providence, Rhode Island, 1893
- Jefferson Hotel, Richmond, Virginia, 1895
- Cairnwood Mansion, Bryn Athyn College, Bryn Athyn, Pennsylvania, 1895
- Henry T. Sloane House, New York City, 1896
- Paterson City Hall, Paterson, New Jersey, 1896
- New York Public Library Main Branch, New York City, 1897–1911
- Burrwood, one of the Gold Coast Mansions on Long Island, New York, 1898–1899 (razed)
- Mary Scott (Mrs Richard T.) Townsend house (Cosmos Club), Washington, D.C., 1898–1901
- Vernon Court, Newport, Rhode Island, 1898
- Blairsden, C. Ledyard Blair house, Peapack, New Jersey, 1898–1903
- Bellefontaine, Giraud Foster house, Lenox, Massachusetts, 1899
- Hamilton Fish Park and Play Center, New York City, 1900 (original park razed)
- Henry Flagler's Whitehall, Palm Beach, Florida, 1900–1901
- Woolsey Hall and other buildings on the Hewitt Quadrangle, Yale University, 1901
- Blair Building, New York City, 1902 (razed)
- Knole, Herman B. Duryea house, Westbury, New York, 1903
- Metropolitan Opera House interior, New York City, 1903 (razed)
- Russell Senate Office Building, Washington, D.C., 1903–1908
- Goldwin Smith Hall and Rockefeller Hall, Cornell University, Ithaca, New York, both 1904
- First Church of Christ, Scientist, West 96th Street, New York City, 1904
- William Collins Whitney Squash Court, at his Aiken Winter Colony estate in Aiken, South Carolina
- Trader's Bank Building, Toronto, 1905
- Arden, E.H. Harriman house, Harriman, New York, 1905–09
- McKinley Monument, Buffalo, New York, 1907
- Cheney-Balzell Manor House, Wellesley, Dover, MA, 1907 -Massachusetts Horticultural Society
- Cannon House Office Building, Washington, D.C., 1908
- Bagatelle, Thomas Hastings house, Old Westbury, New York, 1908
- Century Theatre, New York, 1909 (razed 1931)
- Nemours, Alfred I. DuPont house, Wilmington, Delaware, 1909–10
- Col. Oliver Hazard Payne Estate, Esopus, New York, 1909–11
- Lunt-Fontanne Theatre, New York City, 1910
- Administration Building, Carnegie Institution of Washington, Washington, D.C.., 1910
- Bangor Savings Bank Building, Bangor, Maine, 1912
- Portland City Hall, Portland, Maine, 1912
- W. B. Thompson Mansion, Yonkers, New York, 1912
- U.S. Rubber Company Building, New York City, 1912
- Bank of Toronto head office, Toronto, 1913 (razed)
- Henry Clay Frick House, now housing the Frick Collection, 1 East 70th Street, New York City, 1913–1914
- William Starr Miller House, New York City, 1914, now housing the Neue Galerie
- Sidney Lanier Monument, Atlanta, 1914
- Union Pacific Railroad Depot, 300 South Harrison Street, Pocatello, Idaho, 1915
- Grand Army Plaza, New York City, 1916
- Divident Hill pavilion in Weequahic Park, Newark, New Jersey, 1916
- Kumler Chapel (site of Freedom Summer), Western College, now Miami University, Oxford, Ohio, 1917–18
- Colton Chapel, Lafayette College, Easton, Pennsylvania, dedicated October 1916
- Hotel Washington, Washington, D.C., 1917
- Arlington Memorial Amphitheater, Arlington, Virginia, 1920
- Cunard Building, New York City, as consulting architects to Morris & O'Connor, 1921
- Boise Union Pacific Railroad Depot, 2603 Eastover Terrace, Boise, Idaho, 1925
- Mausoleum of Herbert Eaton, 3rd Baron Cheylesmore in Highgate Cemetery, London, 1926
- Standard Oil Building, New York City, 1926
- Louisville War Memorial Auditorium, Louisville, Kentucky, 1929
- Market Street Bridge, Wilkes-Barre, Pennsylvania, 1929
- Embassy of Laos, Washington, D.C. 1929
- Merill fountain, Detroit, MI 1901

=== Gallery ===
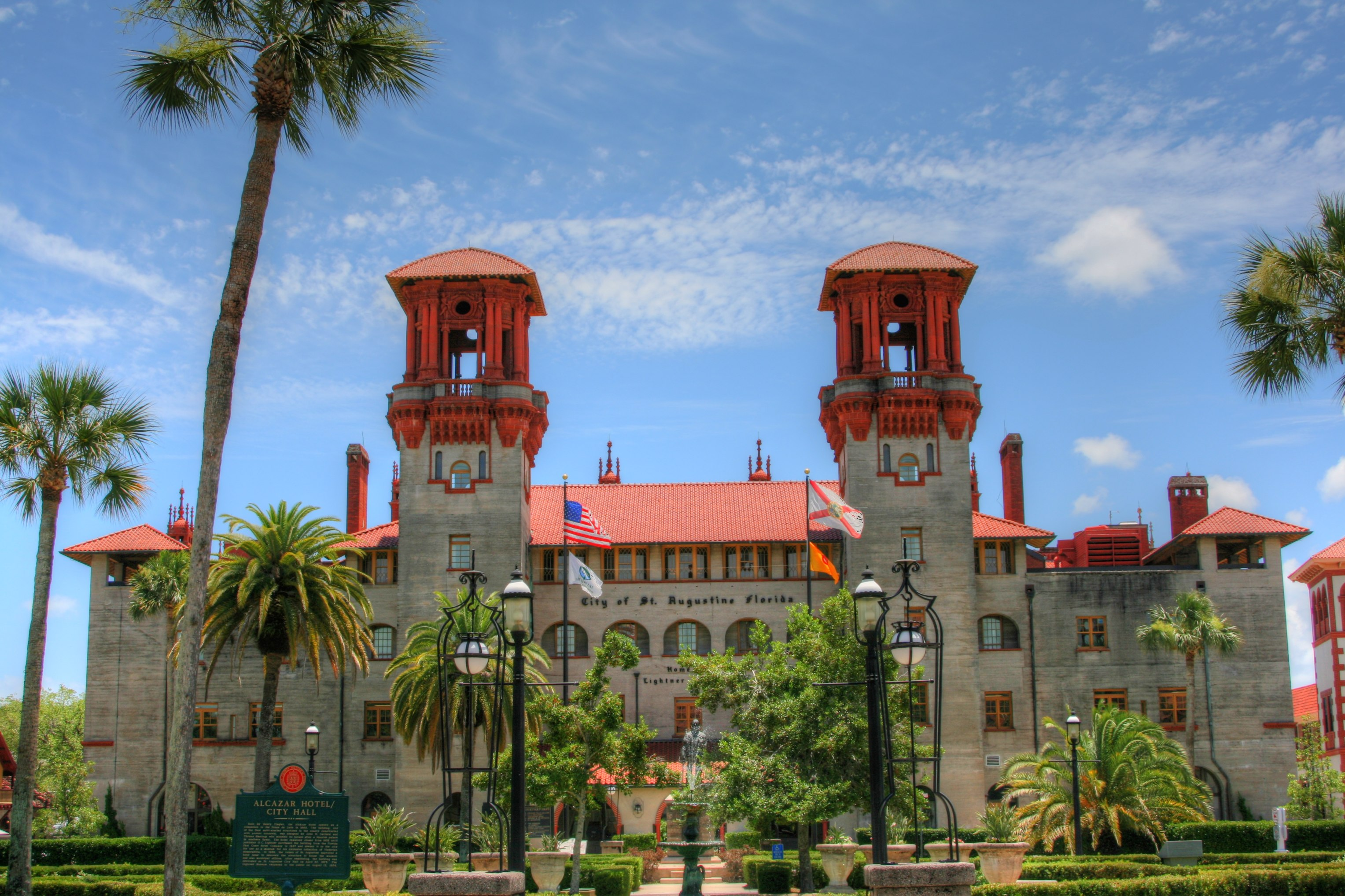
Hotel Alcazar, St. Augustine, FL, 1887

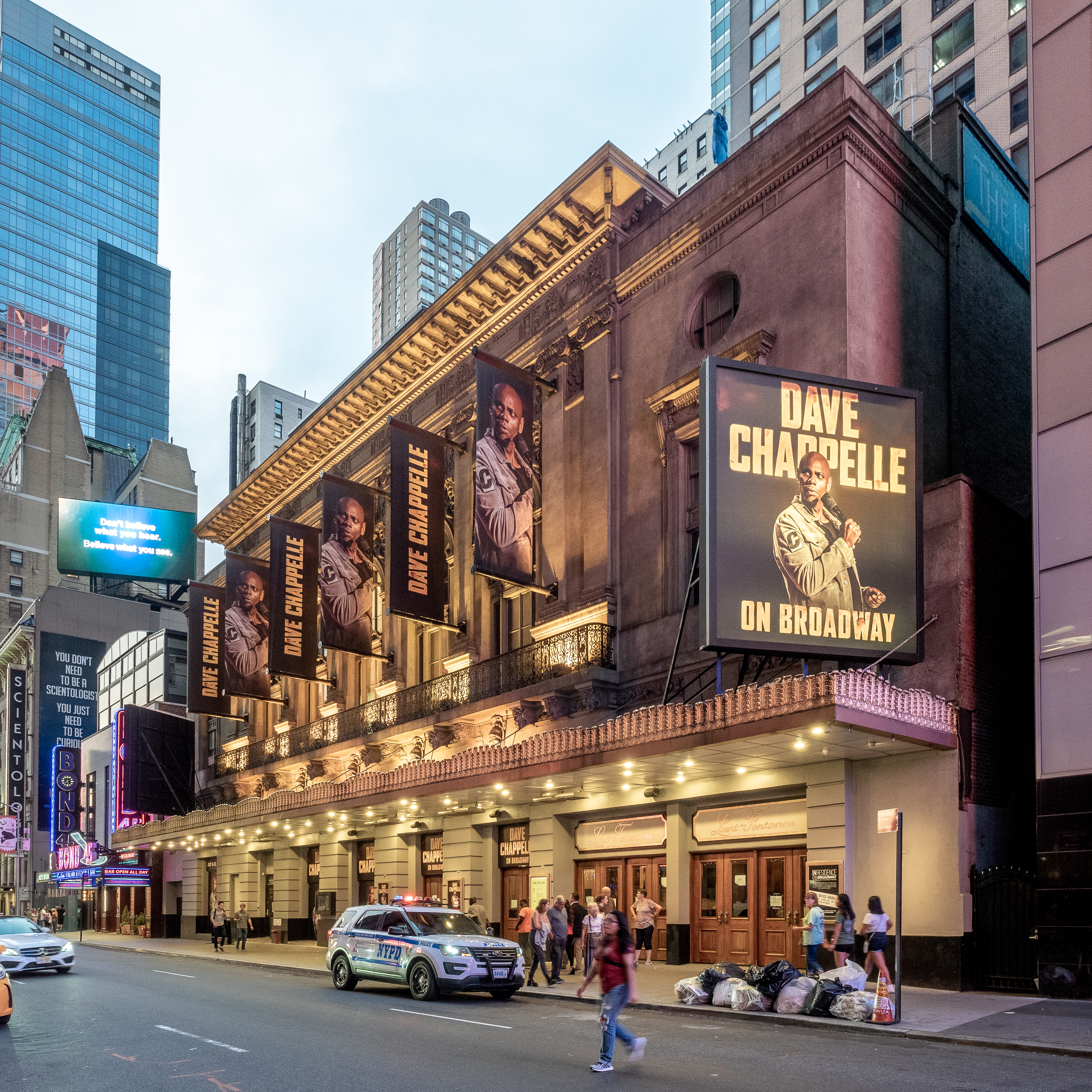
Lunt-Fontanne Theatre, New York City, NY, 1910

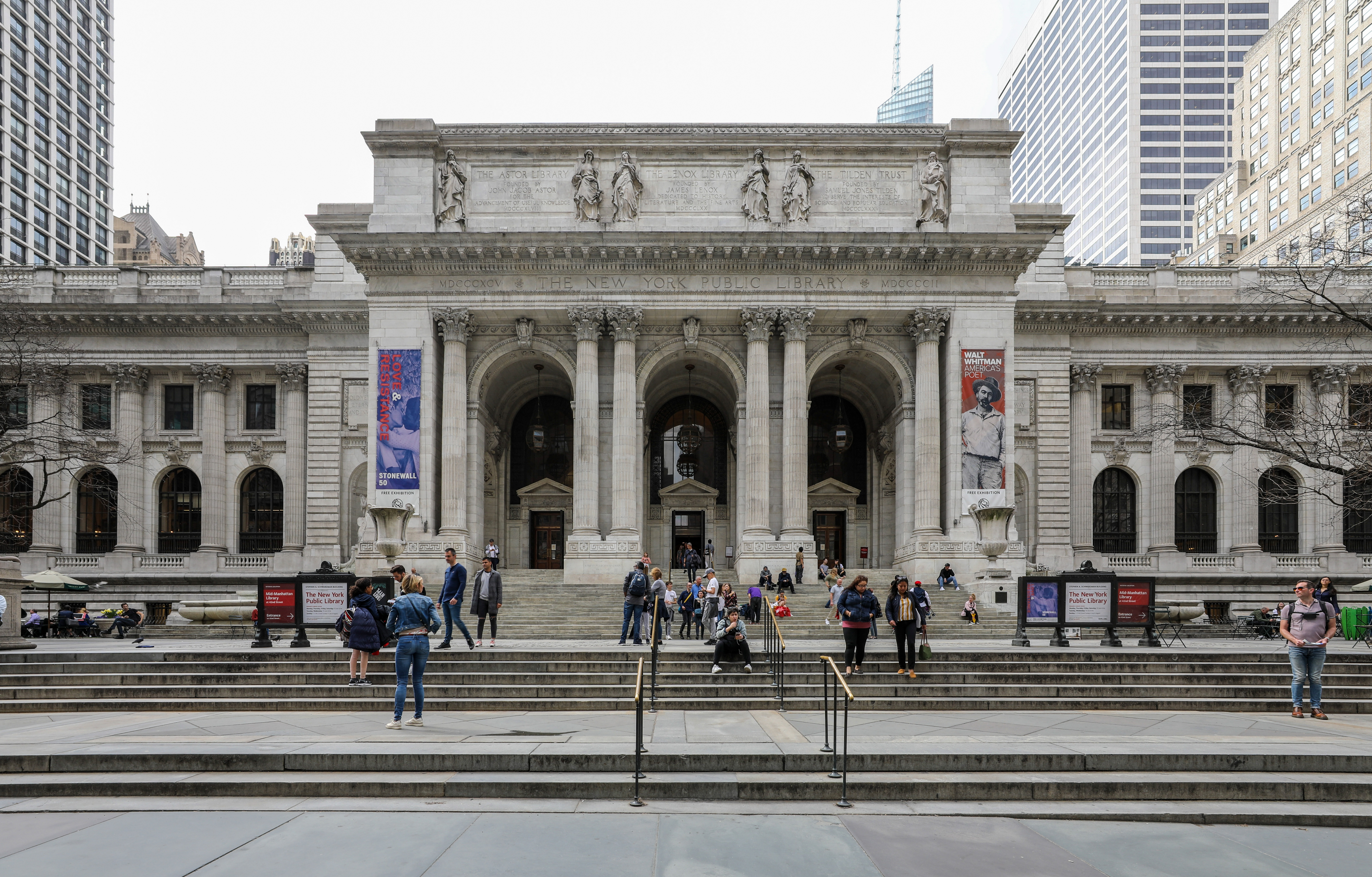
New York Public Library Main Branch, New York City, NY, 1911

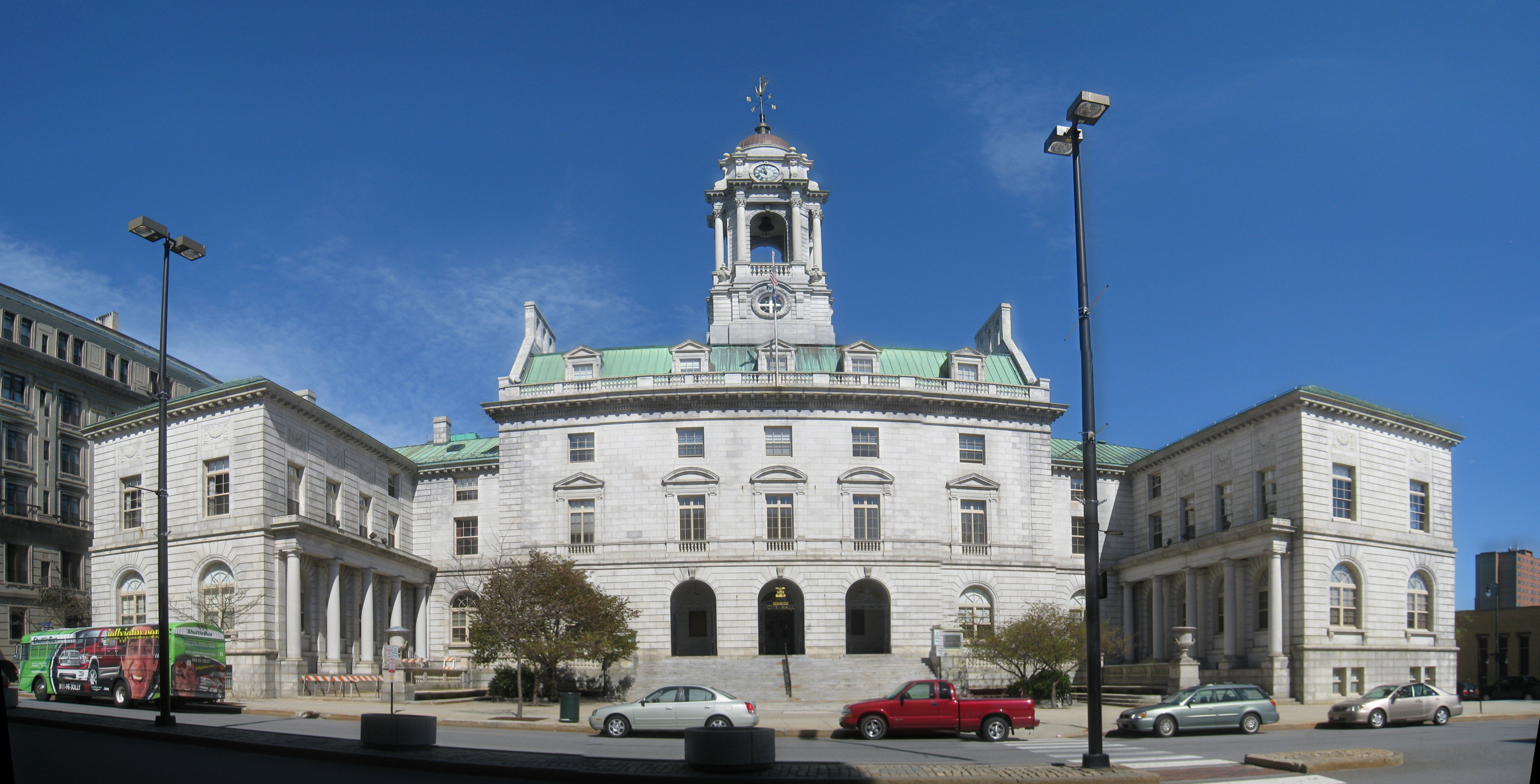
Portland City Hall, Portland, ME, 1912

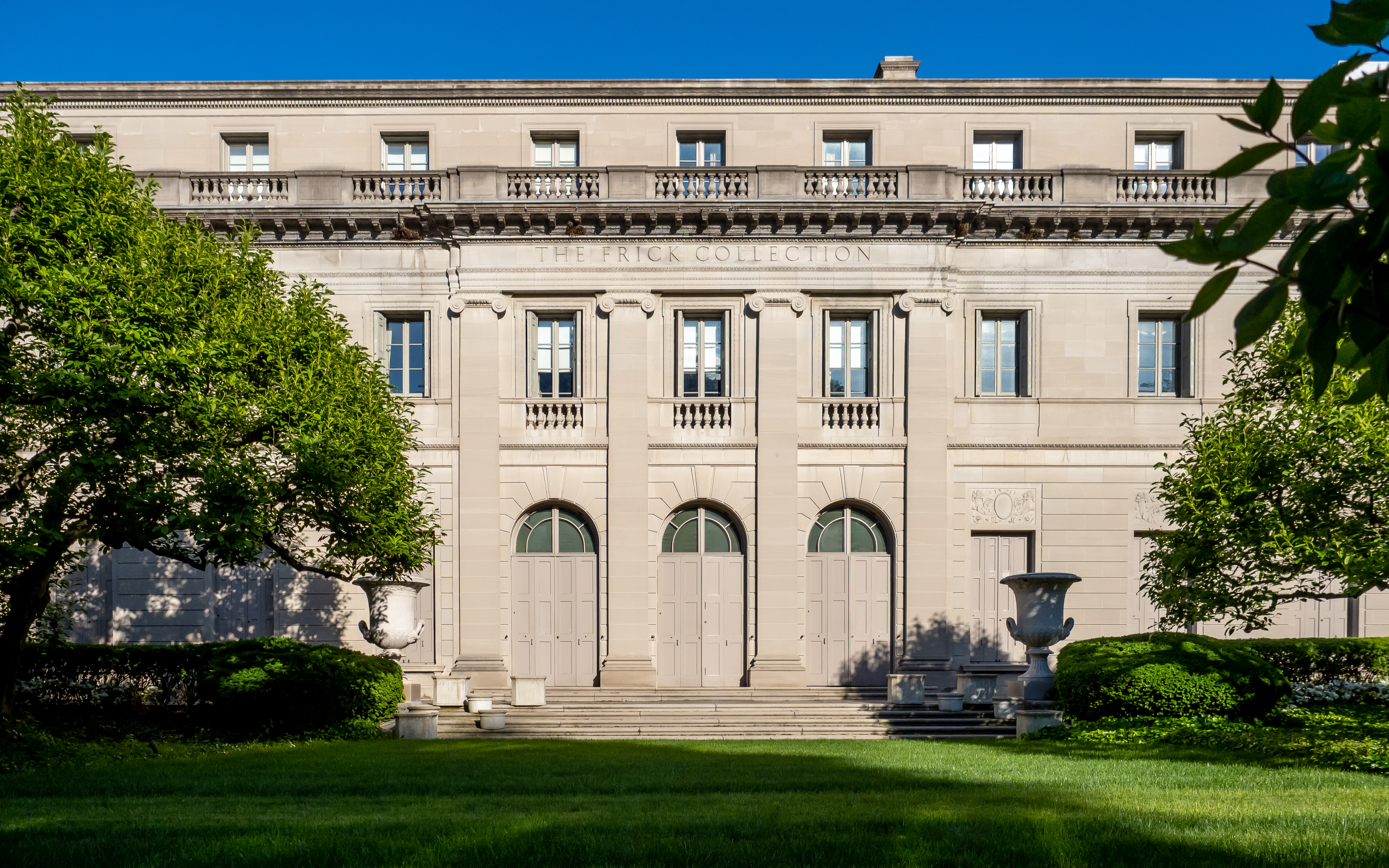
Henry Clay Frick House, New York City, NY, 1914

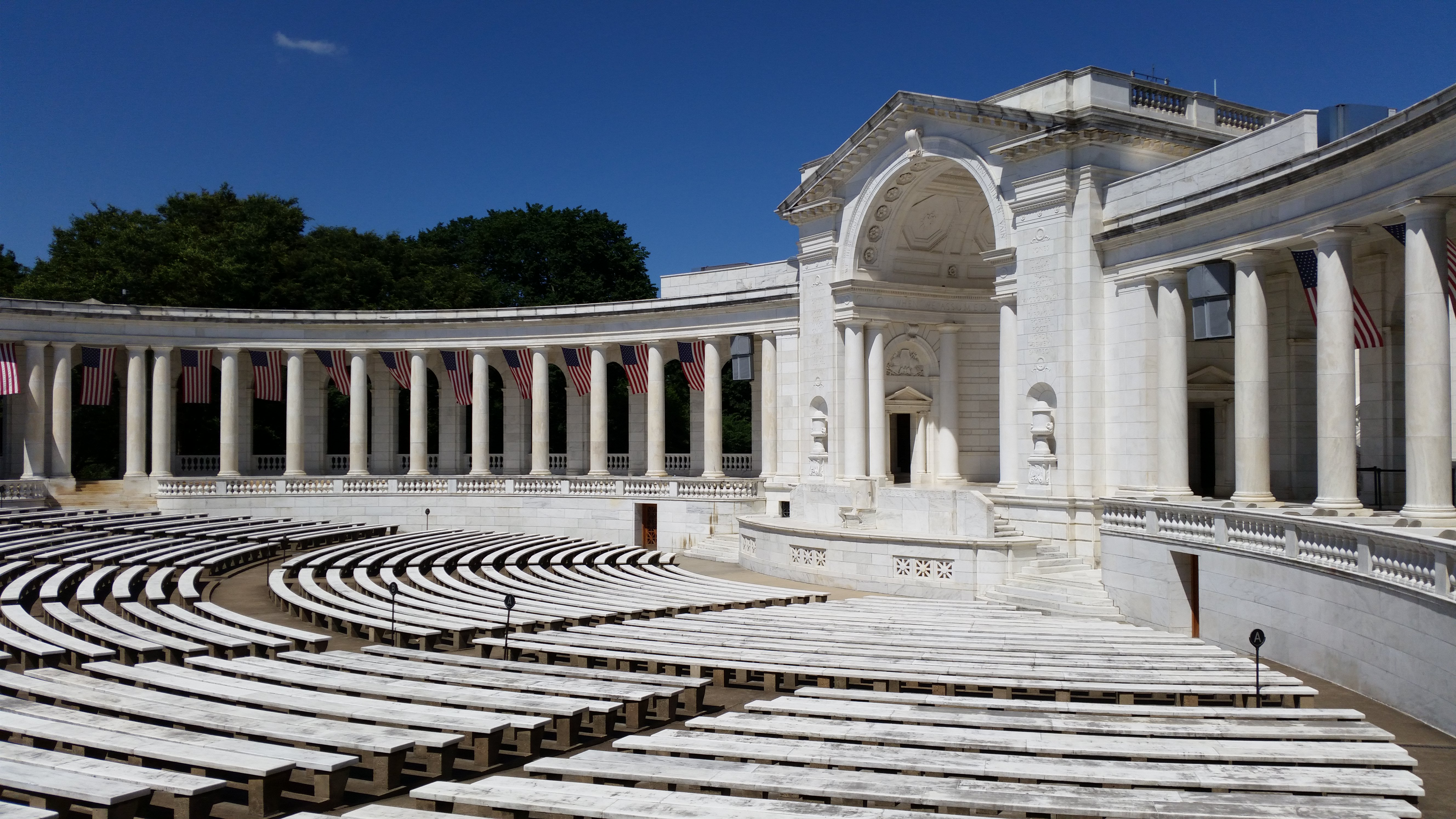
Arlington Memorial Amphitheater, Washington, DC, 1920

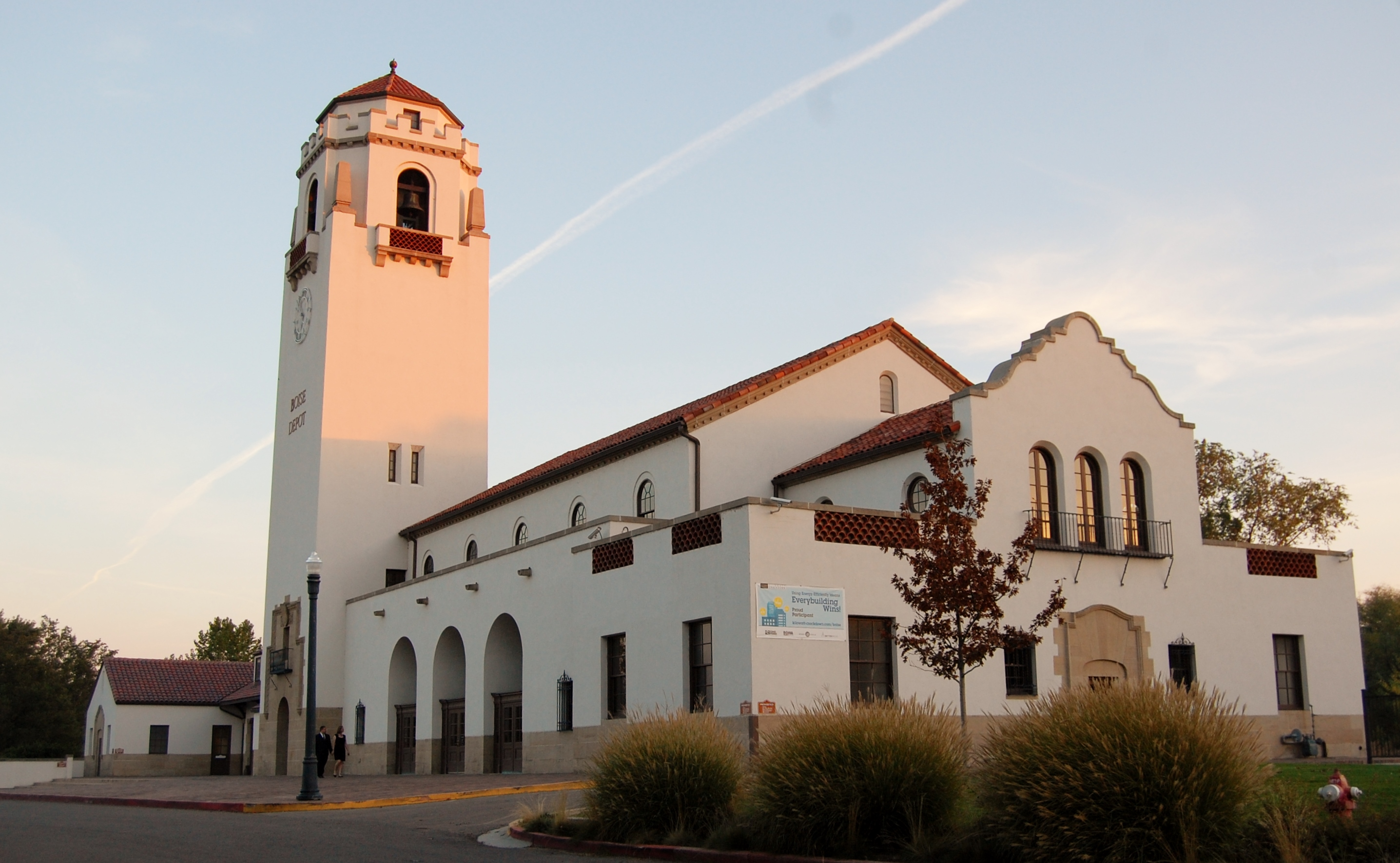
Boise Union Pacific Railroad Depot, Boise, ID, 1925

== Bibliography ==
- Hewitt, Mark Alan; Kate Lemos, William A. Morrison, Charles D. Warren (2006). Carrère and Hastings, Architects. New York: Acanthus Press. ISBN 978-0-926494-42-8
- Ossman, Laurie; Ewing, Heather (2011). Carrère and Hastings, The Masterworks. Rizzoli USA. ISBN 978-0-8478-3564-5.
