= Memorial Auditorium (Louisville, Kentucky) =

Concert venue in Louisville, Kentucky

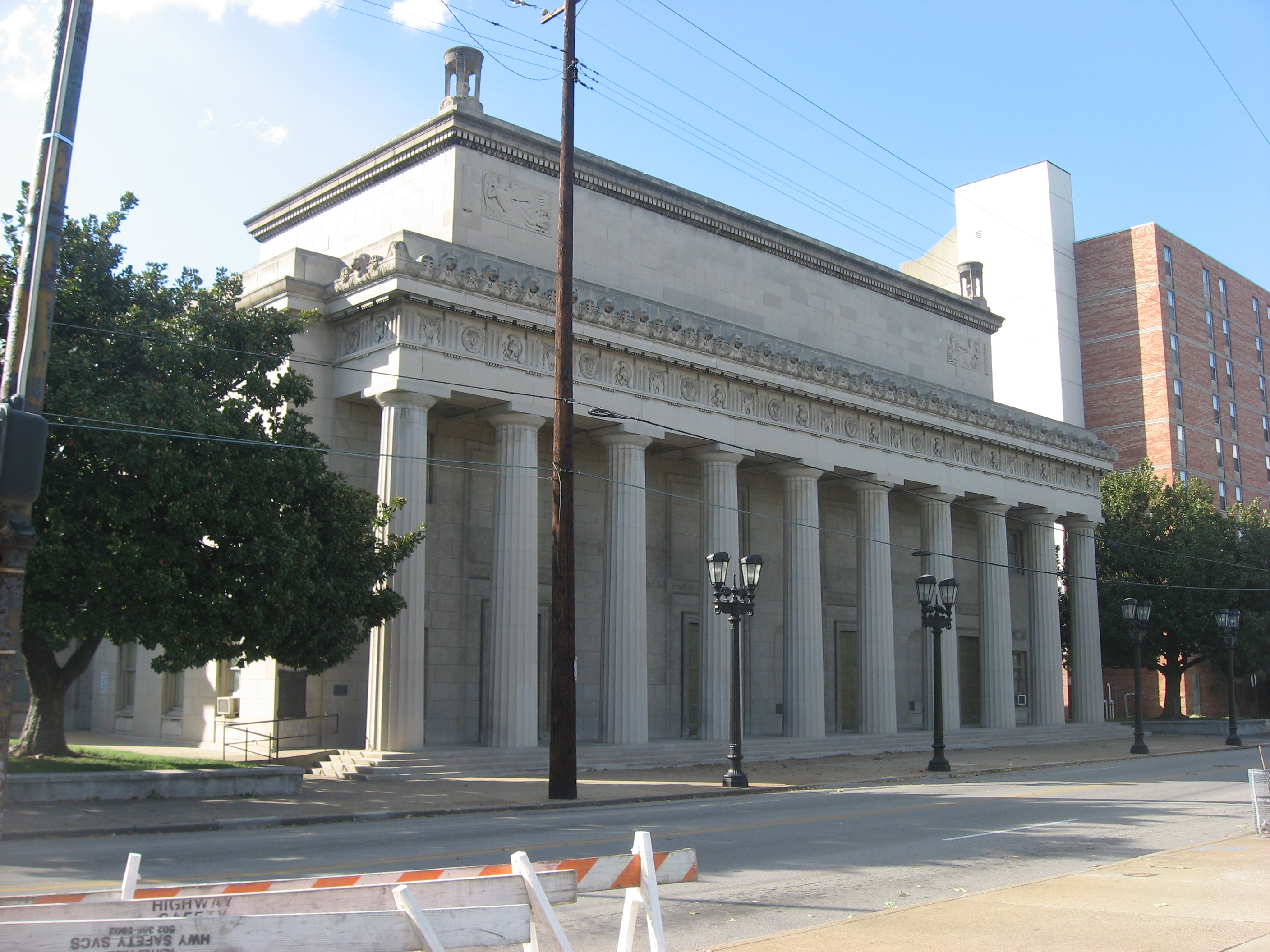
- Entrance to the auditorium
- Interactive map of Memorial Auditorium
- Address: 970 S. 4th St. Louisville, Kentucky; United States
- Owner: Louisville Memorial Commission
- Operator: Louisville Memorial Commission
- Capacity: 1,742

Construction
- Opened: 1927

Website
- www.louisvillememorialauditorium.com
- Louisville War Memorial Auditorium
- U.S. National Register of Historic Places
- Location within Kentucky Location within the United States
- Coordinates: 38°14′21″N 85°45′36″W
- Area: 1 acre (0.40 ha)
- Architect: Carrère and Hastings
- Architectural style: Beaux Arts
- NRHP reference No.: 77000625
- Added to NRHP: December 27, 1977

Memorial Auditorium is a Greek Revival concert venue located at 970 South Fourth Street in Louisville, Kentucky, United States. Designed by Carrère and Hastings, it was dedicated on Memorial Day, May 30, 1929, as a memorial to the people of Louisville who served in World War I. In 1954, the ceiling was lowered and the side balconies were closed off reducing the seating capacity from 2,349 to 1,742 to improve the acoustics.

Memorial Auditorium is home to the world's largest Pilcher organ and the largest operating pipe organ in the region. The instrument is sometimes referred as an orchestral pipe organ, as it includes sounds such as a French Horn, Tuba, a Cor Anglais which you often see in a symphonic orchestra. The organ contains a Tibia, which would be recognized as a large flute, which are usually found in Theater Organs. This historic four-manual instrument with 5,288 pipes has been in operation since opening. The acoustic renovation all but completely closed off the pipe chambers from the renovated hall. It has been designated a landmark by the Louisville Metro Landmarks Commission and is on the National Register of Historic Places.

Although it is now used mainly by organizations for recitals, graduations, etc., it hosted many rock concerts in the 1960s and 1970s, including The Rolling Stones, Chicago, Bruce Springsteen, and Kiss.
