= Albert Sojourner =

American Politician

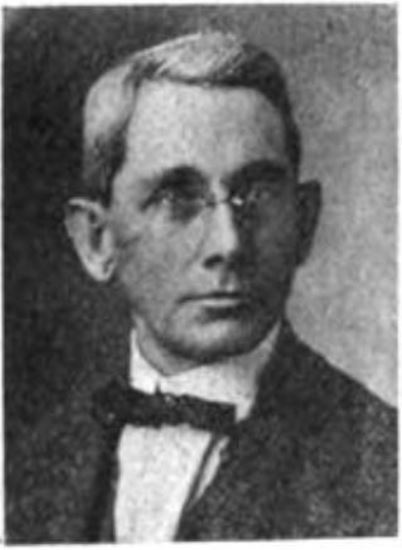

Member of the Mississippi House of Representatives from the Adams County district
- In office January 1916 – January 1924
- Succeeded by: L. T. Kennedy; H. B. Drane

Personal details
- Born: February 4, 1872 Kingston, Mississippi, US
- Died: November 7, 1951 (aged 79)
- Party: Democratic
- Relations: Melanie Sojourner (great-granddaughter)
- Children: 5

Albert Boyd Sojourner (February 4, 1872 - November 17, 1951) was a Democratic member of the Mississippi House of Representatives, representing Adams County from 1916 to 1924.

== Biography ==
Albert Boyd Sojourner was born on February 4, 1872, in Kingston, Mississippi. His father, Absolom Hardy Sojourner, was a Confederate Civil War veteran and member of the Jeff Davis Cavalry Legion. Albert was the Justice of the Peace in Adams County, District No. 2, from 1909 to 1915, and was elected to the Mississippi House of Representatives, representing his native Adams County, in 1915. He was then re-elected in 1919. He died on November 17, 1951.

== Personal life ==
He married Kate Aubrey Bailey in 1907, and she died in 1915. They had five children, Absolom Hardy, Carol Picket, Alexander Boyd, William Aubrey, and Laurence Jackson Sojourner. Albert's great-granddaughter via his son Boyd is Mississippi state senator Melanie Sojourner.
