= Hellenders =

The Hellenders
- Nathaniel; Art by Ed Benes

Publication information
- Publisher: DC Comics
- First appearance: Artemis: Requiem #2 (July 1996)
- Created by: William Messner-Loebs

In-story information
- Base(s): Waverly, Pennsylvania; Various
- Member(s): Nathaniel (alias), Sure-Shot, Requiem, Sojourner, Deadfall, Shock Treatment, Myst, Spiral, Corrode, Warhammer, Rewind, Download, Snow Owl, Pellmell, Signal Ray, Catapult.

The Hellenders are a superhero team published by DC Comics and created by writer William Messner-Loebs.

== Fictional background ==
=== Nathaniel ===
The Hellenders are a group of demon hunting superheroes led by a mysterious man who goes by the alias Nathaniel. The grandson of a well-known Methodist preacher, Nathaniel has taken his family crusade to the next level. By working with the CIA and FBI, the Hellenders try to keep the citizens of Hell from gaining access to the mortal world and destroy supernatural creatures such as vampires, werewolves and ghouls. They travel from place to place in the Angelwing, a flight vehicle that can travel 200 miles per hour, can cloak under radar and has front and rear laser cannons.

=== Amazons ===
When Nathaniel discovered that Wonder Woman had the ability to astral project herself into various lands of myth, he feared that she would try to physically transport herself to the Underworld after she began having violent nightmares of her former Amazon sister Artemis being tortured by demons in order to save her. Nathaniel feared that if Diana were to do this, the physical shift to that realm would rip open portals elsewhere that demons could use to enter the mortal realm. Because of this he assigned several Hellender members to watch Diana at all times. They arrived too late when Diana was finally successful in transporting herself to Artemis in the Underworld, causing the two realities to merge in some respects.

Later when Diana returned to the mortal world, Nathaniel discovered that she had returned with the once-dead Artemis with her. Due to Artemis' time in the Underworld Nathaniel sent Hellender agents to invite the rejuvenated Amazon to become part of the team. She agreed but only on the condition that her new friend Henrietta Jessup join also. Though aggravated at having to train Henrietta who was a civilian with no training whatsoever, Nathaniel agreed due to the prospect of having Artemis in the fold.

=== New Blood ===
Artemis, calling herself the new codename Requiem, proved to be a valuable asset to the team as she spoke and understood demonic languages and was merciless at destroying demons. She also trained Henrietta, now a reserve Hellender calling herself the codename Sojourner, in various fighting forms. They discovered that Nathaniel had used his vast fortune to pay off the town of Waverly, Pennsylvania so that they could use the town as a training base when needed. Suspicious as to why an entire town would allow a team of demon hunters to move in without questions asked, Sojourner began an investigation. She soon discovered that half of the town was too fearful to speak to her due to strange disappearances of townspeople in addition to beastly sounds and chanting that occur at night. The other half of the town had been violently keeping the rest of the town quiet due to the prospect of receiving more financial backing from the Hellenders.

=== Demon war ===
It was later learned that Artemis' demon prince husband Dalkriig-Hath was able to convince Nathaniel that the demon was a fallen angel wishing to re-enter Heaven. Under the guise of a Fallen Angel he taught Nathaniel several spells that supposedly destroyed demons. Instead the spells strengthened the earth-walking demons. They used their newfound power to kill citizens of Waverly as a sacrifice to Dalkriig-Hath. Their sacrifice strengthened the demon greatly, allowing him to create a portal linking the Underworld to the mortal world. Using this portal Dalkriig-Hath managed to escape from his world to New Orleans in an attempt to gain revenge on Artemis.

Sureshot

During this ordeal Dalkriig-Hath managed to kill several Hellender members and transformed the remainder into members of his demon army. After transforming the demonic Hellenders back to human, Artemis was able to kill Dalkriig-Hath, leaving his rule to the more benevolent demon Belyllioth. As a gesture of thanks for giving her Dalkriig-Hath's throne, Belyllioth granted Artemis one wish. Artemis wished for Belyllioth to return the lives of the Hellender members and innocents killed by Dalkriig-Hath. Belyllioth kept her promise and the Hellenders became whole again. In all, seven souls were returned: Nathaniel, Pellmell, Snow Owl, Catapult, and Signal Ray; along with the human Rebecca Fradden and her infant daughter Rosie.

=== Secrets revealed ===
Artemis and fellow Hellender Sureshot were close to forming a relationship due to mutual interest. This changed however during the Dalkriig-Hath affair as Sureshot had a seemingly psychotic break during battle and ran out on the team. When asked what had happened to him Deadfall revealed that Nathaniel had ordered several Hellenders (Sureshot included) to take psychotropic drugs in order to keep them fearless while battling the likes of demons and ghouls. Over time Sureshot's system began to reject the drug's effects. This caused Artemis to lose interest in him. Whether the team's drug use continued or not after Artemis' discovery remains unknown.

=== Exit Artemis ===
Learning that Etrigan the Demon was loose in Gateway City, Nathaniel dispatched Artemis to destroy him. Her mission was unsuccessful as she discovered that the demon was benevolent and resided in the body of the innocent immortal being Jason Blood. After being reunited with Wonder Woman and the Amazons on this assignment, Artemis wanted to return to her Amazon tribe on Themyscira. She became a reserve member, leaving Sojourner to fill her spot as full-time member.

== Team members ==
Team members (top): Shock Treatment, Sojourner, Myst, Requiem, Dead Fall; (middle): Corrode, Spiral; (bottom): War Hammer, and Sureshot. Art by: Ed Benes.

- Nathaniel (Leader) - razor sharp hook for a hand and novice sorcerer. He lost his hand during a battle with a "creature of the night".
- Sureshot (Team Captain) - a master of arsenal and projection weapons, formerly known as Mr. Weapon, the living arsenal.
- Requiem - Amazon warrior.
- Sojourner - novice Amazon, her real name is Henrietta Sojourner Jessup. She originally wanted to be a police officer.
- Deadfall - artificially enhanced with a double Y chromosome, testosterone and strength control.
- Shock Treatment - Marcia Hargis from Far Castle, Pennsylvania. She possesses electricity based powers and flight. Marcia is Nathaniel's advisor and bodyguard. Mother's name is Lila, brother's name is Danny and sisters' names are Beth and Jessie.
- Myst - vapor transformation, team's training coach.
- Spiral - cyclone generation.
- Corrode - physical decomposition powers enhanced by a power suit.
- Rewind - unknown, could possibly be an alternate name for Spiral as he/she is never physically shown.
- Warhammer - super strength, durability and hand held weapons master. One of the first to join the Hellenders, he is fanatical about preserving "good".
- Download - android.
- Snow Owl - cold generating former KGB agent from Russia.
- Pellmell - speedster from Manchester, England. According to Artemis he never knows when to stop, in a good way.
- Signal Ray - telepath and telekinetic from Bosnia.
- Catapult - former Italian soccer star with bionic limbs.

== Appearances ==
- Artemis: Requiem mini-series
- Wonder Woman Vol. 2, #123

== Footnotes ==
- Beatty, Scott (2009). Wonder Woman: The Ultimate Guide To The Amazon Princess. Dorling Kindersley Publishing. p. 43. ISBN 978-0-7894-9616-4.
