= Top 10: The Forty-Niners =

Graphic novel

- Cover to graphic novel

Publication information
- Publisher: America's Best Comics
- Publication date: 2005
- No. of issues: 1
- Main character: Steve "Jetlad" Traynor

Creative team
- Written by: Alan Moore
- Artist: Gene Ha
- Letterer: Todd Klein
- Colorist: Art Lyon

Top 10: The Forty-Niners is a graphic novel published by America's Best Comics in 2005. It is a prequel to the ABC series Top 10, a police procedural set in the city of Neopolis, where superpowers, robots, monsters, and other comic fodder are the norm for all citizens. It was written by Alan Moore, drawn by Gene Ha, and colored by Art Lyon, with lettering, logos, and design by Todd Klein. Unlike the original series and its spin-off Smax, it was released in one 112 page edition instead of being released in separate issues and collected later. It won the 2006 Eisner Award in the "Best Graphic Album: New" category.

The Forty-Niners is set in 1949, in the founding days of Neopolis. After World War II, realizing that average citizens do not want to live next door to the science heroes, mutants, and robots largely responsible for the Allied victory, the U.S. government built Neopolis, where all of these exceptional people can live together. The story primarily follows a young Steve Traynor, a.k.a. Jetlad, the boy fighter ace who will later become Captain of Neopolis Police Precinct 10, from which the series derives its name. The primary story lines follow Jetlad's meeting with the great love of his life (seen at the end of Top 10: Book 2) and the formative days of the Neopolis Police, as they try to prove that they can bring order to the chaos of Neopolis in the face of vampire gangsters and bigotry against robots.

The story features several characters who either appear in the original Top 10 or else who are alluded to in conversation or background picture.

== Cast of characters ==
see List of characters in Top 10: The Forty-Niners

== Plot summary ==
Steve "Jetlad" Traynor is aboard a train going directly to Neopolis, a new city created in America that will house all the science heroes, scientists, magicians, vampires and any other 'special' person throughout the United States and even parts of the world. On the train, he happens to cross paths with the Skywitch, Leni Muller. The Skywitch and Jetlad were enemies in the beginning of the war, before Leni defected to the Allied Power after learning how evil the Nazi regime truly was. On the same train car they meet a Hungarian man, who is also a vampire, covered in head to toe to save himself from the sun's light. Jetlad and Skywitch reminisce about their past and discuss their future in Neopolis. They share a cab to City Hall where they register and join an assembly to hear from the mayor, John Q. Public, who explains to all new citizens that the city of Neopolis is a new, social experiment full of the specials of the world, making them paradoxically normal in the city, and to make certain that they do not become vigilantes. After the assembly, Jetlad and Skywitch find a boarding home run by a Betty Doesgood, one of the first citizens of Neopolis. She explains to Steve and Leni that the first citizens of Neopolis were not science heroes but public characters, like Betty Doesgood who ran an advice column. Leni and Steve soon decide to visit a nearby bar to learn their surroundings and for Leni to inquire about a singing job. While in the bar, Leni and Steve meet the members of the Skysharks, a group of international pilots that fought against the Axis Power in World War II. Some of the Skysharks are impressed that Steve Traynor was Jetlad at such a young age. They all sit together and the Skysharks offer Steve Traynor a job at their hangar as a mechanic, which he readily accepts. Soon a pair of vampires enters the bar, demanding that the owner pay some protection money. Jetlad and the Skysharks get up to help the owner and suddenly three police officers, The Maid, Rocket Ryan and Steelgauntlet, enter the bar. The Maid, with her powers being divine, scare the vampires out of the bar, but not before they warn that they will be back. The Skywitch is inspired by the police officers, particularly by the Maid, and asks her if there are any positions available as a police officer. Skywitch is given information on how to reach the city's precinct and is told to apply the next day.

Jetlad works at the Skyshark's hangar as a mechanic and starts a friendship in particular with Wulf. Their conversation sometimes leads to awkward lapses and Jetlad finds himself lying, saying that Leni Muller is his girlfriend. In the hangar's canteen, Sharkey speaks to Jetlad and Wulf, informing them that the mayor of Neopolis may consider shifting power from the police and giving it to the military, to units like the Skysharks. The city of Neopolis is overrun with crime from the vampires and the robot population and Sharkey feels that the military could do a much better job than any police officer. Meanwhile, the Skywitch begins her first day as a police officer in Neopolis. She meets her captain, Doctor Omega, who has Steelgauntlet introduce her to her fellow police officers, including Sea-Knight and Major Lilliput. He then introduces her to her new partner, Black Rider. They go on patrol and shortly stop an act of vigilantism. The pair are then called to the Institute of Science, where pardoned, former Nazi scientists and science heroes work to make Neopolis as advanced as possible through architecture and other ideas. When they arrive at the institute, they find the body of Herr Panzer, a scientific advisor, on the floor, an apparent victim of murder. Black Rider opens Herr Panzer's helmet to find his skeleton covered in ash. They recruit the assistance of Major Lilliput to bring Herr Panzer's body to the station to be investigated further. The Skywitch tries to interview the Nazi scientists and advisors, but none are forthcoming with motives or any other information. That night, Jetlad and Wulf arrive at the bar near Betty Doesgood's boarding home and find the Skywitch nearby. Still feeling awkward over some of the exchanges he has had with Wulf during the day, Jetlad becomes very forward with Leni, even kissing her in front of Wulf. Leni is very surprised to find Jetlad this way and they both go back to the boarding room, leaving behind a grim Wulf, where they attempt to be intimate, but Jetlad is unable to go very far. That night the vampires that tried to racketeer money from the bar owners arrive back and kill the owner and his wife.

The next morning, things become very awkward between the Skywitch and Jetlad. The Skywitch goes to work where she becomes part of a contingency of officers that are raiding a vampire brothel. The Maid, whose divine powers are the most effective against the undead, is part of the group, as well as Black Rider and Steelgauntlet. They are able to raid the brothel, with the Maid and Skywitch having to kill one male vampire, Miroslav, who runs the prostitution operation. They also arrest a client in the brothel, someone named Junior Q. Public, the mayor's nephew. Meanwhile, Jetlad and Wulf speak to each other at the Skyshark's hangar and they have a talk. Wulf reveals to Jetlad that he is a homosexual and is attracted to him, but that he won't play any immature games. Wulf leaves Jetlad to ponder that information. Meanwhile, the Skywitch and her fellow officers report back to their captain, Doctor Omega, who realizes that the news of the mayor's nephew being arrested may cause John Q. Public to give up on the police department and simply use the military to bring order to Neopolis. Doctor Omega also realizes that the vampire fraternity of crime will retaliate after the events of the brothel raid. After the meeting with the captain, the Skywitch is told that Drang, one of the Nazis who was pardoned and works at the institute, has come to the precinct to speak to her. They go from the precinct to the institute, where Drang explains to the Skywitch that she had an affair with Herr Panzer, cheating on her perceived husband, Sturm. She also explains that Sturm was her brother and the Nazi regime forced them into their relationship, to bring forth a master race through their genetics. Drang disliked the idea and fell for Herr Panzer, who, before being killed, had informed Drang that the Iron Mask and Professor Gromolko were undertaking a secret project called the Janons. Gromolko and Iron Mask told everyone that the Janons project was meant to create energy but it was actually a time machine. Their plan was to go into the past and to alter events so that the Nazi regime could win the war. The Skywitch and Black Rider immediately rush to stop the two Nazis and finds that Professor Gromolko has already entered the machine. The Skywitch follows him immediately while the Black Rider holds Iron Mask. The Skywitch is able to stop Professor Gromolko before he could cause any damage with the time stream and brings him back to the present time, even though he and Iron Mask are able to escape. Doctor Omega informs Skywitch and Black Rider how proud he is of them for stopping any damage that Gromolko could have done. Doctor Omega then speaks to Steelgauntlet, telling him that he heard a tip that Miroslav's replacement for running the brothel would be coming into town from the train station at a certain time. Steelgauntlet expresses his concern that this may be a trap and Doctor Omega agrees, but cannot allow this opportunity to be squandered, especially with the bad attention they are receiving from the mayor. Meanwhile, Jetlad comes to terms with himself and tells Wulf that he is ready to further their friendship. They both leave the hangar and Sharkey, the Skyshark's leader, stays behind plotting a bomb run for Neopolis, not wanting to wait for the mayor's official sanction in taking care of the crime in the city.

The police officers of Precinct 10 make plans to scope out the train station so they can arrest the incoming vampire meant to run some of their illegal operations in Neopolis. The Maid informs her fellow officers that she will not be available for the bust that night, much to everyone's dismay. The Maid's divine powers make her the most effective against the vampires. This conversation is overheard by a vampire seer, who informs the vampire's leaders that the trap is set and the ambush against the police officers will eradicate them once and for all, especially with the Maid not being there. As the officers leave the Precinct to go to the train station, the Skywitch is approached by Jetlad, who apologizes for his advances. He tells Leni that he is gay and is with Wulf, and hopes that they can remain friends. The Skywitch has too much on her mind and leaves, saying that maybe they could talk later. The police officers are in the train station, awaiting the vampire intended to run some of their illegal operations, when they are ambushed by a plethora of vampires from the city. The press had been informed of the night's bust, so they broadcast the events to all of Neopolis. While the vampires descend on the police, Jetlad rushes to the hangar to grab his plane, Black Beauty, and help Leni and her fellow officers.
