= Nicola Scott =

Australian artist

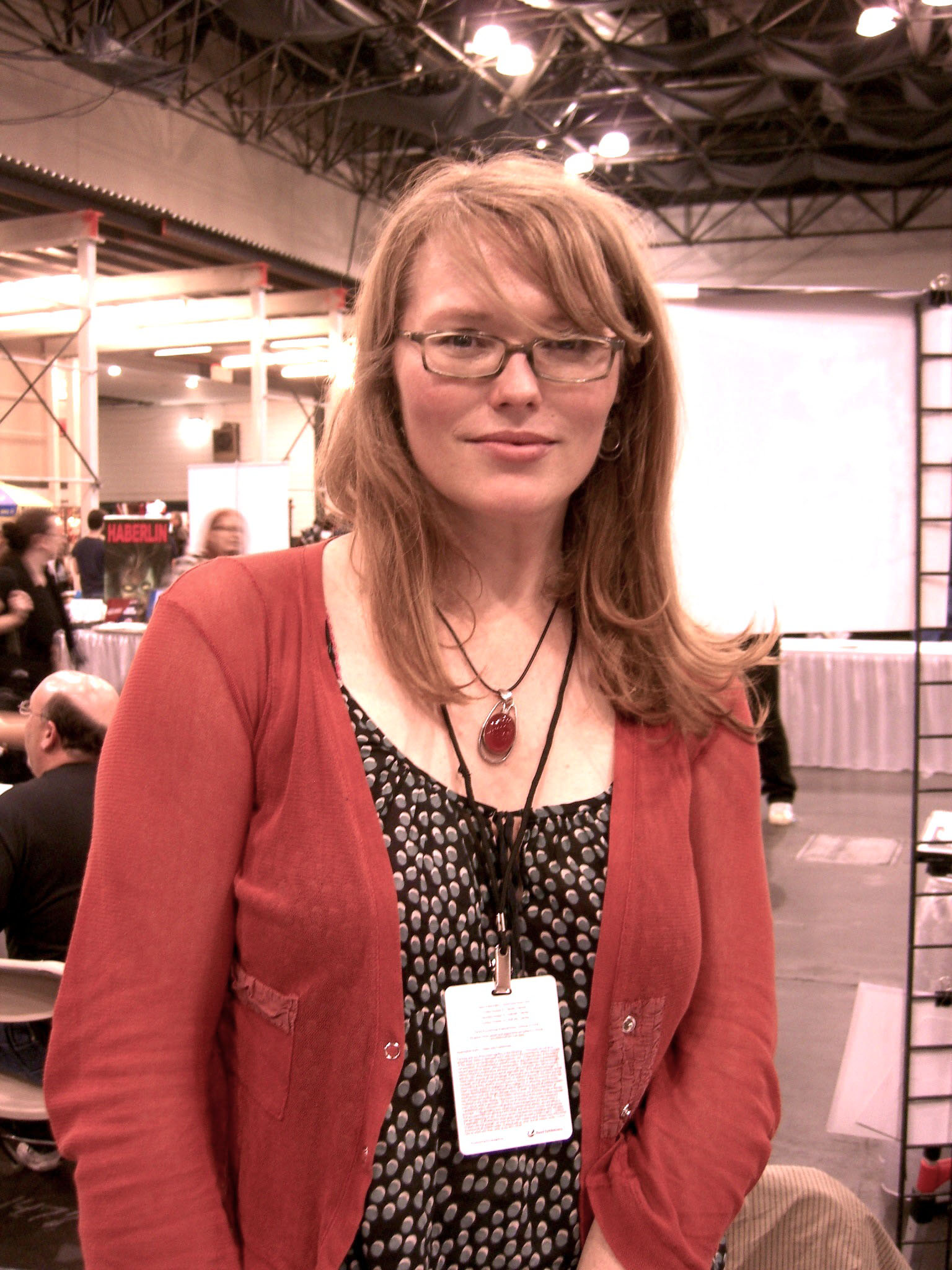
- Scott at the New York Comic Con, October 2010
- Areas: Penciller, Artist, Inker
- Notable works: Birds of Prey; Earth 2 Secret Six; Black Magic; Wonder Woman Historia: The Amazons

Nicola Scott is a comics artist from Sydney, Australia whose notable works include Birds of Prey and Secret Six. In 2016, she and writer Greg Rucka relaunched Wonder Woman for DC Comics Rebirth and created the comic series Black Magick, which was published by Image Comics.

== Career ==
Scott's Wonder Woman from Wonder Woman: Year One (2016)

After a brief acting career, Scott decided in 2001 to become a comic book artist. She made her debut in the comics industry by painting covers for a series titled The Watch published in Australia by Phosphorescent Comics. In 2002, she traveled to San Diego Comic-Con to begin making contacts in the U.S. comics industry. In 2003, she obtained work from Top Cow Comics which in turn led to her being hired by DC Comics. Her first work in the U.S. market appeared in Star Wars: Empire #26 (October 2004) published by Dark Horse Comics. In December 2005, Wizard magazine featured Scott as a "Talent to Watch". At DC, she collaborated with writer Gail Simone on Birds of Prey and Secret Six. In 2010, she drew the Wonder Woman tie-in to Blackest Night. In July 2010, Scott was announced as the artist of the Teen Titans starting with issue #88 and she drew the series until the end of its run with issue #100 (October 2011). Scott penciled Superman vol. 3 issues #3, 5, and 6. In January 2012, DC announced Scott and writer James Robinson as the creative team of Earth 2, a new series focusing on the Justice Society of America. Scott's work on that series has been described as her "mainstream breakthrough". She drew the creator-owned series, Black Magick, which was written by Greg Rucka and published by Image Comics. She and Rucka launched a new Wonder Woman series for DC Comics in June 2016. Scott drew the even-numbered issues and Liam Sharp drew the odd-numbered issues. Scott left the Wonder Woman series as of issue #14 and returned to drawing Black Magick.

In December 2022, Scott illustrated the third and final issue of Wonder Woman Historia: The Amazons. Written by Kelly Sue DeConnick, the three-issue limited series takes place before the birth of Diana and tells of the creation of the Amazons and how Hippolyta became their queen. The first Wonder Woman Historia: The Amazons issue was illustrated by Phil Jimenez and the second by Gene Ha; an omnibus edition of the comics miniseries was released in June 2023.

== Critical reception ==
Reviewer Doug Zawisza of Comic Book Resources praised Scott's work on Superman #6 and compared her favorably to George Pérez, stating, "Luckily, it seems Scott can keep up with Pérez line for line. While Scott’s is definitely more grounded in reality than Pérez's (evident in the scene featuring the alien landscape of Jazuur), these two creators work quite well together. Scott’s art, from quiet moments like Lois calling out to Clark to the louder moments of the Supermen battle royale, is consistent and breathtaking, begging the readers to stop awhile and study it." Critic Mike Miallaro of CriticalBlast.com had positive words for Scott's art in Black Magick saying that "she really goes above and beyond throughout this entire book. Everything is drawn with such incredible detail." Karen O'Brien with CBR Exclusives gave praise for Scott's detail work in the "Wonder Woman Year One" finale. She said that "Scott's scrupulous attention to detail through this series had indicated a deference for Wonder Woman’s importance in comics history and a bold determination to bring her forward, providing a believable place for the Amazon’s values in the modern world that feels comfortable and never contrived."

== Works ==
- Star Wars: Empire #26–27: "General Skywalker" (with Ron Marz, ongoing series, Dark Horse Comics, October–November 2004)
- Star Wars: Free Comic Book Day (with Miles Lane, one-shot, Dark Horse Comics, May 2005)
- Season of the Witch #3–4 (with Jai Nitz, four issue limited series, Image Comics, January–March 2006)
- Angel Spotlight: Illyria (with Peter David, one-shot, IDW Publishing, April 2006)
- Spike vs. Dracula #5 (with Peter David, five issue limited series, IDW Publishing, June 2006)
- Halloween Man, Drew Edwards
- Birds of Prey #100–110, #113–119 (with Gail Simone, DC Comics, January 2007–August 2008)
- "Chapter Four: Fang You So Very Much" (with Wilfred Santiago, in Dead High Yearbook, graphic novel, Penguin Publishing, 2007)
- "The Origin of the Birds of Prey" (with Mark Waid, in 52 #48, limited series, DC Comics, June 2007)
- Secret Six #1–7, 9–14 (with Gail Simone, ongoing series, DC Comics, November 2008–December 2009)
- Blackest Night: Wonder Woman (with Greg Rucka, three issue mini-series, DC Comics, February–April 2010)
- Wonder Woman vol. 3 #42–44, and a pin-up for #600 (with Gail Simone, ongoing series, DC Comics, May 2010–July 2010)
- Teen Titans vol. 3 #88–100 (with J. T. Krul, ongoing series, DC Comics, December 2010–October 2011)
- Superman vol. 3 #3, 5–6 (with George Pérez, ongoing series, DC Comics, January 2012–April 2012)
- Earth 2 #1–6, 9–12, 14–19, 21–23, 25 (with James Robinson and Tom Taylor, ongoing series, DC Comics, July 2012–January 2013, April 2013–July 2013, September 2013–March 2014, May 2014–July 2014, September 2014)
- Legends of the Dark Knight vol. 2 #1 (with Tom Taylor, ongoing series, DC Comics, December 2012)
- Convergence: The New Teen Titans #1–2 (with Marv Wolfman, DC Comics, June–July 2015)
- Black Magick #1–11 (with Greg Rucka, Image Comics, October 2015–March 2018)
- Wonder Woman vol. 5 #2, 4, 6, 10, 12, 14, 750 and Annual #1 (with Greg Rucka, ongoing series, DC Comics, Early September 2016–Early March 2017, March 2020)
- Wonder Woman Historia: The Amazons #3 (DC Comics, December 2022)

Preceded by James Raiz	Birds of Prey artist 2007–2008	Succeeded by Michael S. O'Hare
Preceded by Jose Luis	Teen Titans vol. 3 artist 2010–2011	Succeeded by n/a
Preceded by n/a	Earth 2 artist 2012–2014	Succeeded by Andy Smith
