= Wonder Woman Historia: The Amazons =

Limited comic book series published by DC Comics

Publication information
- Publisher: DC Comics
- Formats: Original material for the series has been published as a set of limited series.
- Genre: Superhero
- Publication date: November 2021 – December 2022
- Number of issues: 3
- Main character(s): Hippolyta; Hera

Creative team
- Writer(s): Kelly Sue DeConnick
- Artist(s): Phil Jimenez (Book 1); Gene Ha (Book 2); Nicola Scott (Book 3)
- Letterer(s): Clayton Cowles
- Colorist(s): Hi-Fi, Arif Prianto, Romulo Fajardo Jr. (Book 1); Wesley Wong (Book 2); Annette Kwok (Book 3)

Reprints
- Collected editions
- Hardcover: ISBN 978-1779521354
- Absolute Edition: ISBN 978-1799508465

Wonder Woman Historia: The Amazons is an American comic book published by DC Comics under its Black Label imprint. The three-issue limited series was written by Kelly Sue DeConnick and illustrated by a different artist for each issue (Phil Jimenez for the first book, Gene Ha for the second book, and Nicola Scott for the third book). Published in commemoration of the 80th anniversary of Wonder Woman, the comic series received critical acclaim, with the first book winning the Will Eisner Comic Industry Award for Best Single Issue in 2022.

== Plot ==
=== Book One ===
Antiope narrates the events leading to the creation of herself and her sister Amazons.

Fed up with mortal women being enslaved and subjected to constant abuse, seven Greek goddesses — Hestia, Artemis, Demeter, Hecate, Aphrodite, Athena, and Queen Hera— gather on Mount Olympus to demand that all mortal men be punished for mistreating women, only for their request to be turned down by Zeus, Hera's womanizing husband and king of the Olympian gods.

Undeterred, the goddesses, except Hera, secretly travel to Tartarus, regrouping at the Well of the Lost, the resting place for the souls of all women murdered by men. Using her powers, each goddess forms a quintet of female warriors — called Amazons — from the dead women's souls. Composed of six tribes each with its own queen and patron goddess, the thirty Amazons travel the ancient world to rescue enslaved women from male traffickers whom they kill in acts of vigilantism. Hera, who foresees all women's futures, warns Athena that the Amazons must not be seen during the day.

Meanwhile, a midwife's widowed assistant named Hippolyta has been ordered to abandon an unwanted newborn girl due to the infant's father already having three other daughters. After giving the baby a drachma and sending her down the river, Hippolyta changes her mind, racing against the elements to reclaim the child but is unsuccessful.

In the dead of winter, Hippolyta is held hostage by traffickers but rescued by the Amazons who leave her food, clothing, and Antiope's horse before disappearing into the night. Back on Olympus, Hera turns the abandoned baby's soul into a bird to spy on Hippolyta who then rides off in search of the Amazons.

=== Book Two ===
As the seasons pass, Hippolyta resumes her search for the Amazons, following the trail of murdered traffickers.

One night, Hippolyta encounters Artemis; after Hippolyta declares her wish to become an Amazon, Artemis informs her when the female warriors will strike next in exchange for Antiope's horse. Following Artemis' instructions, Hippolyta reunites with the Amazons and tells them her wish; after some deliberation, the queens of the six tribes agree and Hippolyta becomes the seventh Amazon queen, her own tribe worshipping all six creator goddesses and made up of the women the Amazons rescue and bring back to their secret hideout to become honorary sisters.

To keep their existence a secret from the male gods, especially Zeus, the Amazons hide during the day and only go on their missions at night when Artemis can watch over them. But just as Hera had warned, however, a young Amazon named Tarpeia enters Apollo's temple during the day and kills a murdered trafficker's son while he is praying to the sun god.

Now aware of the Amazons' existence, the gods send an all-male army to annihilate the warrior women as Hera commands her spy to warn the goddesses.

=== Book Three ===
With the Amazons' existence no longer a secret, Demeter calls out Hera for not bothering to help the female warriors, whose creation was the Olympian Queen's own idea.

Back on Earth, the Amazons battle against the gods and their male soldiers. The Amazons even slay Zeus' son Heracles, who had tried to fight them in one of his infamous labors, prompting his father to angrily lash out at Hera.

Hippolyta merges all seven Amazon tribes into one group and leads as their sole Queen. Despite their bravery and skills, however, the Amazons are no match for their male enemies and suffer many losses. When Artemis sends down Antiope's horse, Hippolyta rides it to Olympus where she strikes a deal with Zeus: the Amazons' lives in exchange for their freedom. Except for Tarpeia, all the Amazons, dead and living, are given long lives yet are forever imprisoned on Themyscira, an island where are they allowed to do as they please while under the sun god's watch; once a month, Artemis is allowed temporary guardianship of the warriors she had helped create.

Grieving over depriving her sisters their freedom, Hippolyta solemnly forms a baby girl from the clay sand on the island's beach before walking off into the sea with the intent of drowning herself. Hera, Artemis, and the five other goddesses soon arrive and bring the clay baby to life by using the soul of the very child Hippolyta was ordered to abandon.

Submerged under the sea, Hippolyta hears the newborn baby's cries. Rushing back to take care of the child, Hippolyta finds the drachma and realizes it's the baby girl who she originally raced to rescue. She contemplates what to name this child as the name "Diana" is shown carved on the beach sand behind her. From Mount Olympus, the seven goddesses look proudly upon their champion and her new daughter.

== Publication ==
=== Development ===
The series was first announced as part of DC Comics new Black Label imprint in 2018, with Kelly Sue DeConnick writing and Phil Jimenez on art duties. Speaking in a podcast interview, DeConnick stated part of her desire for the series was to tell a "Homerian epic" with a woman at the center of it. Her interest also came from her dissatisfaction with the portrayal of the Amazons in the 2017 Wonder Woman movie.

=== Issues ===
Issue	Publication date	Comicscore Index	Ref.
#1	November 30, 2021	94	
#2	April 5, 2022	92	
#3	December 27, 2022	85	

== Reception ==
The series received widespread critical acclaim, with the first issue receiving the Will Eisner Comic Industry Award for Best Single Issue in 2022 and Phil Jimenez winning Best Penciller/Inker. The later completed collection would win the Eisner Award for Best Graphic Novel (Reprint) in 2024 and be nominated for a 2024 Hugo Award for Best Graphic Novel or Comic.

Kelly Thompson would cite Historia as a major influence on her Absolute Wonder Woman series. James Gunn, one of the co-heads of DC Studios, called the book a "breathtaking work of sequential art".
