= Smax =

- Smax, art by Gene Ha

Publication information
- Publisher: America's Best Comics (DC Comics)
- First appearance: Top 10 #1 (2000)
- Created by: Alan Moore

In-story information
- Alter ego: Jeff Smax (born Jaafs Macksun)
- Team affiliations: Top 10
- Abilities: Near invulnerability Super strength Concussive blast from torso

Smax is a fictional character from the comic book series Top 10 written by Alan Moore, illustrated by Gene Ha, and originally published by the now defunct America's Best Comics imprint of DC Comics. A Top-10 spin-off miniseries also called Smax focused on the character and provided him with more of a backstory.

== Character history and description ==
Jeff Smax (born Jaafs Macksun) is a gigantic, blue-skinned, white-haired, super-powered, demi-ogre policeman who lives and works at Precinct 10, in a city populated by "science heroes". Smax originally hailed from a land based on fantasy myths and fairy tale legends but had left after a horrifying failure during his career as a dragon slayer. Smax is both extremely strong and invulnerable to most forms of harm, including radiation. He is gruff and guarded amongst his peers, mostly due to the frequent loss of loved ones he has experienced in life (most notably his dear friend and late partner, Stochastic Fats). Though initially reluctant to become friendly with his new partner, Robyn Slinger AKA Toybox, he eventually bonds with her, even feeling a need to protect her. The pair are not romantically involved, however, as Smax has an intimate relationship with his twin sister, Rexa. This is not an unusual situation in Smax's home dimension, which has far different laws of physics and science. Rexa eventually comes to live with Smax; the details of their unique relationship is known to Robyn, who keeps it secret. Smax is fairly resourceful in the line of duty, but he has a quick temper and is not intellectually inclined, often not thinking things through. Smax has experience using weaponry, including his Singing Sword, but he most often prefers using his fists or his Strong Light energy (which emanates from his solar plexus).

== Publishing history ==
The Smax miniseries was written by Alan Moore, and penciled by Zander Cannon, who also inked the first issue. Andrew Currie inked the rest of the miniseries.

== Miniseries plot ==
The story deals with Smax and Toybox returning, via magical teleportation, to Jeff's magically enchanted home world. Smax, now a city dweller, seems embarrassed by his unsophisticated, sword-and-sorcery roots. They attend Smax's uncle's funeral where Jeff introduces Robyn as his wife, though no such relationship exists. At this point Jeff's sister Rexa Macksun is introduced, dressed in the typical garb of a female fantasy barbarian such as Red Sonja and just as tall and physically impressive as her brother with the same blue skin and white hair.

It is revealed Jeff has been away from home for some time, having originally left his world fleeing personal and literal demons. Once a great dragon slayer, a job needed to pay the bills for his adopted dwarven family, Smax failed to stop an extremely powerful, shape-shifting dragon named Morningbright from destroying a little girl. She was burned to ashes in front of him, forever leaving a white burn mark of a hand on his chest.

Cover of the trade paperback

Further story developments reveal sexual tension between Smax and Rexa. The two were born of an unwilling union between a monster and a human warrior woman with magical strength. Despite this, the pressure of delivering twins kills her during childbirth, but her durability is passed on to her children. Their monstrous father abused them both and molested Rexa, who found love and solace in her brother's arms. Smax eventually killed their father so they could escape together. Though in their medieval home world their relationship wasn't particularly frowned upon, Smax developed conflicted feelings about the propriety of their love. For various reasons, Smax, Rexa, Robyn, and other heroes venture out to destroy Morningbright. Smax's heroic efforts cause the mark on his chest to be removed.

The series was collected into a hardcover edition (ISBN 1-4012-0325-6) in 2004 and in paperback (ISBN 1-4012-0290-X) in November 2005.

== See also ==
- List of Top 10 characters
