= Phil Jimenez =

American comics artist and writer

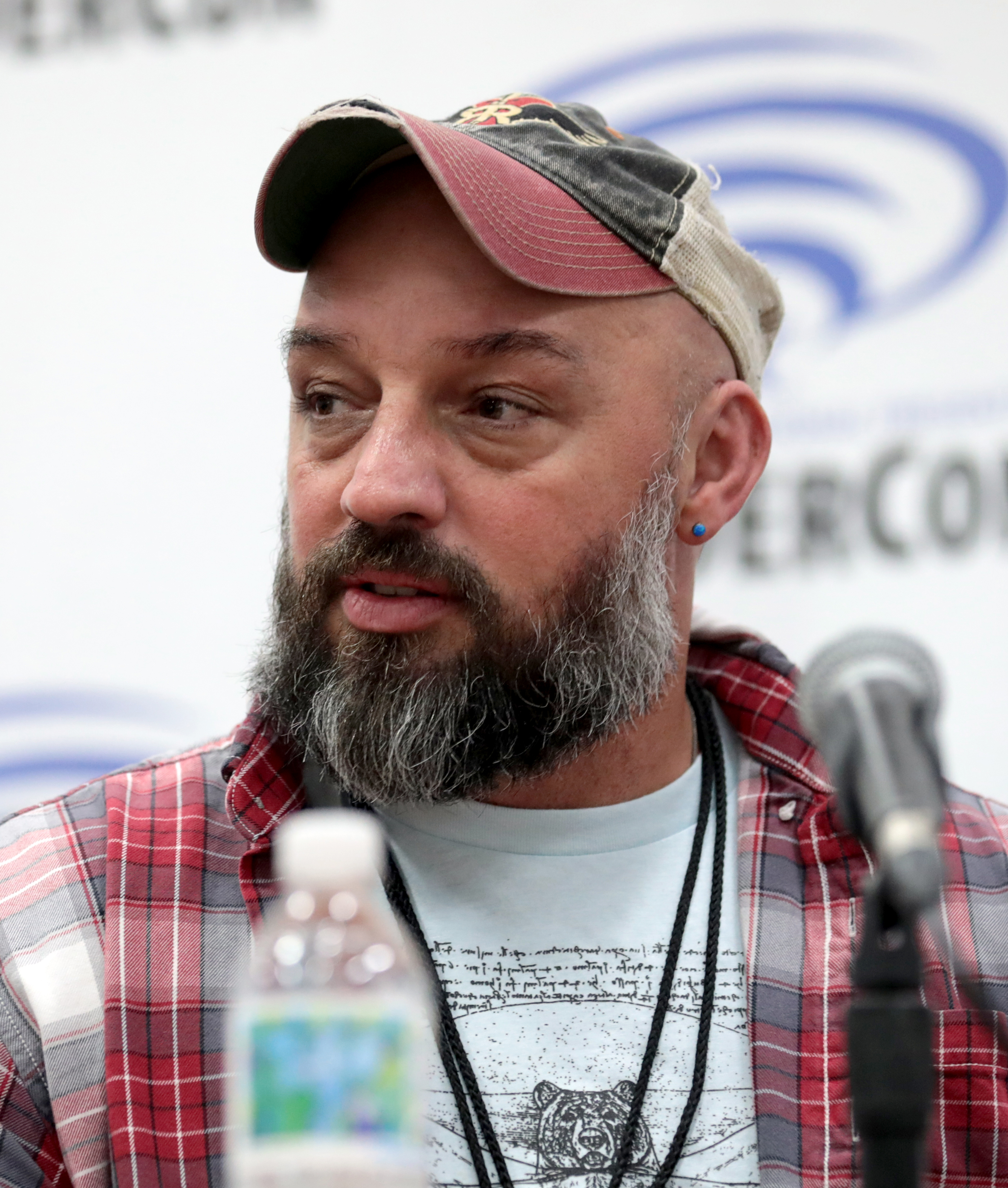
- Jimenez at the 2023 WonderCon
- Born: Philip Jimenez; July 12, 1970 (age 56)
- Areas: Writer, Penciller, Inker
- Notable works: Astonishing X-Men; Infinite Crisis; The Invisibles; New X-Men; Wonder Woman; Wonder Woman Historia: The Amazons

Phil Jimenez (born July 12, 1970) is an American comics artist and writer known for his work as writer/artist on Wonder Woman from 2000 to 2003, as one of the five pencilers of the 2005–2006 miniseries Infinite Crisis, his collaborations with writer Grant Morrison on New X-Men and The Invisibles, and his artistry for his 2021 critically acclaimed partnership with writer Kelly Sue DeConnick on Wonder Woman Historia: The Amazons.

== Early life ==
Phil Jimenez was born and raised southern California. He attended the School of Visual Arts in Manhattan, New York, where he majored in cartooning. He graduated with a Bachelor of Fine Arts degree in 1991.

== Career ==
After graduating from SVA, Jimenez was hired by DC Comics Creative Director Neal Pozner at age 21, with his first published work illustrating four pages in the 1991 miniseries War of the Gods. Pozner was HIV-positive when he and Jimenez started dating, and was hesitant about dating someone younger and HIV-negative. Nonetheless, Jimenez became both Pozner's partner and caretaker, saying:

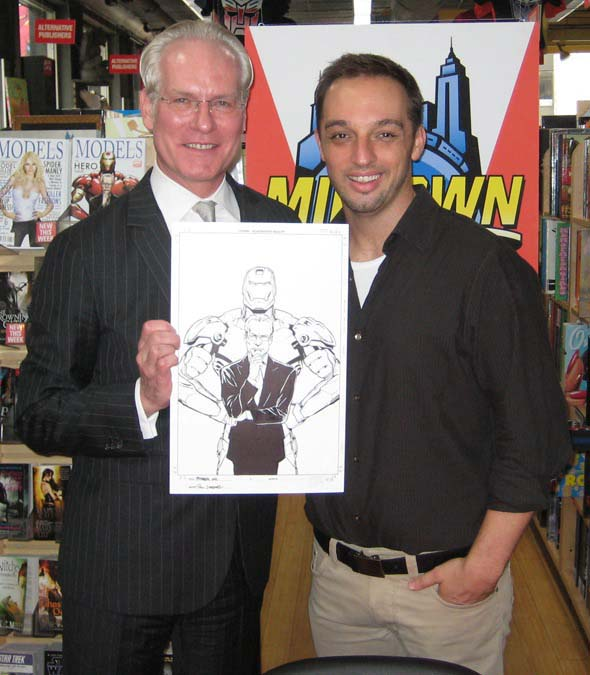
Jimenez with Tim Gunn at Midtown Comics Times Square in Manhattan, for the September 9, 2009 signing of Models, Inc., the first issue of which features Jimenez's illustration of Gunn on the cover, the art for which Gunn is holding in the photo

Neal Pozner was my first editor, and he was probably my greatest mentor at DC Comics. He was an incredibly talented man, with some very strong opinions about the way things should be done. I developed a crush on him the minute I met him, and I wanted to know more about him, and I wanted to be with him all the time. So I'd hang out with him at work, in the offices, far later than I had any reason to. I would buy clothes I couldn't afford to impress him. And eventually, I mustered the nerve to ask him on a date. And he was 15 years older than I was. And he had been my boss. And so, against his better judgement, he said yes. And it actually ended up being a really wonderful relationship.

Following Neal Pozner's death in 1994, Jimenez wrote and illustrated the 1996 DC miniseries, Tempest, based on a character from Pozner's late-1980s Aquaman series. In the last issue, Jimenez dedicated the miniseries to Pozner, and wrote an editorial page in which he came out publicly for the first time. "It got over 150 letters," he says, "including the classic letter from the kid in Iowa: 'I didn't know there was anyone else like me.' That's what counts. It meant a lot to people."

Much of Jimenez's work is related to works by George Pérez, whose art strongly influenced Jimenez. Jimenez has worked on several Teen Titans-related series (some issues of the ongoing series New Titans and Team Titans, and the miniseries JLA/Titans, The Return of Donna Troy and Tempest), was the main artist of Infinite Crisis, a sequel to Crisis on Infinite Earths, and did a long run as writer/artist of Wonder Woman beginning with issue #164 (Jan. 2001). Pérez had worked on the series in the late 1980s to early 1990s. Pérez and Jimenez would also co-write a two–part story together in Wonder Woman (vol. 2) issues #168–169 in 2001. Jimenez would leave as series writer/artist with issue #188 in March 2003. Jimenez and Pérez also have worked together in 2005–2006 in the miniseries Infinite Crisis (where Jimenez was the main penciller, and Pérez drew some sequences and covers for the series) and DC Special: The Return of Donna Troy (written by Jimenez and inked by Pérez).

Jimenez is also known for his work on various titles for DC Entertainment's "mature readers" imprint, Vertigo, including Swamp Thing, The Invisibles with writer Grant Morrison, and his own creator-owned series, the sci-fi/fantasy mashup Otherworld. In 2003, Jimenez drew several story arcs of Morrison's New X-Men run.

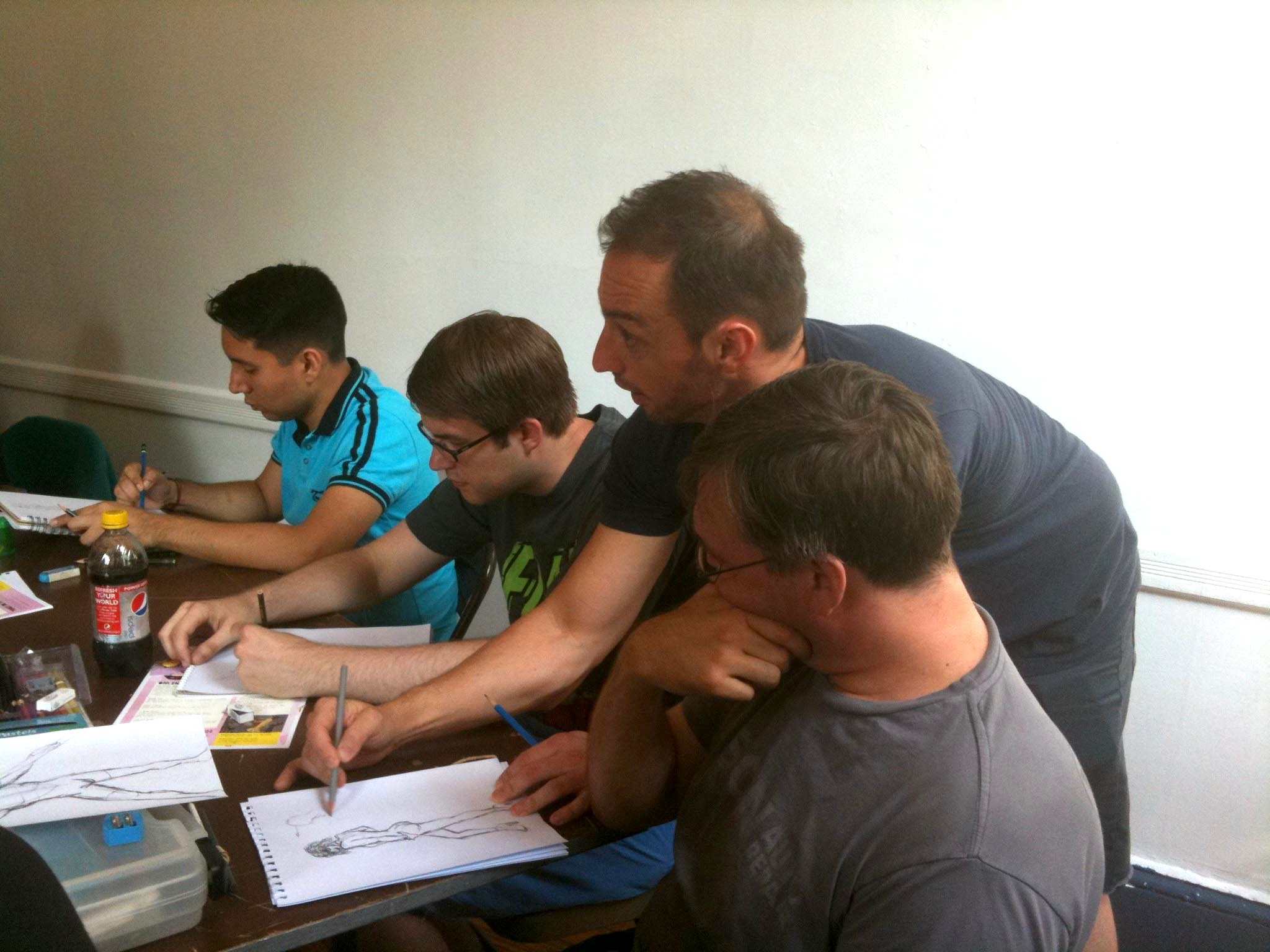
Jimenez supervising a June 12, 2011 figure drawing class at the LGBT Center in Manhattan

It was announced at the 2007 San Diego Comic-Con that Jimenez had signed an exclusive contract with Marvel Comics. He was one of the four artists working on Marvel's flagship title, The Amazing Spider-Man, the company's sole Spider-Man title, in which Marvel upped its frequency of publication to three issues monthly, and inaugurated the series with the "back to basics" story arc "Brand New Day" at the beginning of 2008. His first work on Spider-Man was in the Free Comic Book Day 2007: Spider-Man #1 (June 2007) comic book, with writer Dan Slott, which served as a prelude to "Brand New Day". Jimenez and writer Bob Gale co-created the Freak in The Amazing Spider-Man #552 (March 2008). Ana Kravinoff, the daughter of Kraven the Hunter, was introduced in The Amazing Spider-Man #565 (September 2008) by Jimenez and Marc Guggenheim. During his run, Jimenez drew the cover for The Amazing Spider-Man #583, featuring Barack Obama.

In 2009, Marvel Editor-in-Chief Joe Quesada announced that Jimenez would become the artist of Astonishing X-Men beginning with issue #31. Jimenez co-wrote the book The Essential Wonder Woman Encyclopedia with John Wells for Del Rey Books in 2010 and updated through Random House in 2015. He later returned to DC Comics, illustrating a brief stint on Adventure Comics featuring the Legion of Super-Heroes, and Fairest, a spin-off of Bill Willingham's series Fables.

He appeared at the White House for the National Design Awards to present original art to First Lady Michelle Obama.

Jimenez appeared in a panel discussion on diversity in sci-fi/fantasy fandom in the March 19, 2015 episode of the Comedy Central humor and commentary program The Nightly Show with Larry Wilmore, along with Marvel Comics' director of content and character Sana Amanat, hip-hop artist Jean Grae and comedian Mike Lawrence. During the discussion, Jimenez commented, "It feels strange to me that we would partition race, gender and nerd as if they were distinct things...All human beings are this combination of experiences and ideologies...Everybody's get some nerd in them. But the idea that, somehow, being a nerd is separate from one’s religious or moral or political beliefs is strange to me. We all bring everything to our decision-making on a daily basis."

As part of the DC Rebirth relaunch of DC's titles, Jimenez was the writer and artist of the Superwoman series from 2016 to 2017. He got involved with Rebirth when he was originally assigned to be the artist of Superman but after DC changed their publishing plan, he was asked to work on Superwoman. Jimenez uses his own experiences and emotions and projects them onto the characters in his work. He uses the anxiety he experienced with his mother's death to relate to how Lana Lang deals with her losses. In addition, Jimenez wanted to create a female villain who was not sexually charged, and was motivated by something other than baby-making.

In November 2021, Jimenez illustrated the first issue of Wonder Woman Historia: the Amazons. Written by Kelly Sue DeConnick, the three-issue limited series takes place before the birth of Diana and tells of the creation of the Amazons and how Hippolyta became their queen. The second Wonder Woman Historia: the Amazons issue was illustrated by Gene Ha and the third by Nicola Scott; an omnibus edition of the comics miniseries was released in June 2023. He returned to the Titans once again writing and drawing Titans Annual #1 (2025), which was released on July 30. The Annual focuses on Donna Troy, the second Wonder Girl, as she meets her estranged father for the first time.

== Other work ==
A diorama enthusiast, Jimenez teaches a life drawing course as part of the undergraduate cartooning program at the School of Visual Arts in Manhattan, where he himself once studied. He has held figure drawing classes outside of SVA, at places such as the LGBT Center in the West Village.

Jimenez provided sketches seen in the 2002 superhero film Spider-Man. In scenes in which Peter Parker, played by Tobey Maguire, is seen creating sketches of his costume, the close-ups of his hands are actually those of Jimenez.

Jimenez created art for the first permanent AIDS awareness exhibit at the Museum of Science and Industry in Chicago. His art has appeared on album covers and in editorial magazines. His artwork has been featured in mainstream publications such as TV Guide, and he himself has been profiled or recognized in Entertainment Weekly, The Advocate, Instinct magazine and Out magazine.

== Awards and recognition ==
- One of Instinct magazine's 2006 Men of the Year
- Listed as one of Entertainment Weekly's "101 Gay Movers and Shakers
- 2010 Inkpot Award
- September 2011 Inkwell Awards Ambassador (September 2011 – present)
- 2022 Will Eisner Comic Industry Award – Best Single Issue with writer Kelly Sue DeConnick for Wonder Woman Historia: The Amazons #1
- 2022 Will Eisner Comic Industry Award – Best Penciller/Inker for Wonder Woman Historia: The Amazons #1

== Personal life ==
Jimenez came out as gay in 1992, and his first public relationship was with Neal Pozner, who hired him at DC that same year.

== Bibliography ==
As artist unless otherwise noted.

=== DC Comics ===
Interior art

- Action Comics #836 (2006)
- Adventure Comics (Legion of Super-Heroes) #523–525 (2011)
- Aquaman Annual #1 (among other artists) (1995)
- DC Countdown #1 (2005)
- DC Rebirth #1 (2016)
- DC Special: The Return of Donna Troy #1–4 (writer only) (2005)
- Deathstroke, the Terminator Annual #1 (with Gabriel Morissette) (1992)
- Fanboy #6 (1999)
- 52 #24 (full art); #25, 35, 38 (among other artists) (2006–2007)
- Green Lantern, vol. 5, #17 (2013)
- Guy Gardner: Warrior #24, 29, 35, 44, Annual #1–2 (1994–1996)
- Infinite Crisis, miniseries, #1–7 (among other artists) (2005–2006)
- JLA #50 (among other artists) (2001)
- JLA/Titans, miniseries, #1–3 (co-plot & pencils) (1998–1999)
- Legends of the DC Universe 80-Page Giant #1 (Teen Titans) (1998)
- Legion of Super-Heroes, vol. 4, #94 (among other artists) (1997)
- Legion of Super-Heroes, vol. 6, #6 (2010)
- Lobo #20 (1995)
- The New Titans #94–96, Annual #8 (1992–1993)
- Nightwing, vol. 3, #38 (2018)
- Nightwing Secret Files and Origins #1 (1999)
- Robin #6, 11–13 (1994–1995)
- Secret Files President Luthor #1 (writer only) (2001)
- Showcase '93 #1–2 (Cyborg) (1993)
- Showcase '94 #5–6 (Robin and Huntress) (1994)
- Showcase '95 #12 (Supergirl) (1995)
- Showcase '96 #1 (Tempest) (writer only) (1996)
- Starman Secret Files #1 (1998)
- Superman, vol. 2, #200 (among other artists) (2004)
- Superman and Batman: World's Funnest #1 (among other artists) (2001)
- Superman Secret Files and Origins #2 (among other artists) (1999)
- Superwoman #1–8 (writer; also artist on #1–2, 5–7, 2016–2017)
- Team Titans #1, 7–10, 13–14 (penciler); 17–20, Annual #2 (writer only) (1992–1994)
- Teen Titans, vol. 2, #17–18 (1998)
- Teen Titans/Outsiders Secret Files 2003 #1 (2003)
- Tempest, miniseries, #1–4 (1996–1997)
- Titans #25 (among other artists) (2001)
- Titans Annual #1 (2025) (writer/artist/cover art)
- Titans/Legion of Super-Heroes: Universe Ablaze #1–4 (2000)
- Underworld Unleashed: Abyss Hell's Sentinel #1 (1995)
- War of the Gods #4 (1991)
- Wonder Woman, vol. 2, #164–188 (2000–2003)
- Wonder Woman: Donna Troy #1 (1998)
- Wonder Woman Historia: The Amazons #1 (2021)
- Wonder Woman Secret Files and Origins #2–3 (1999–2002) (writer/artist/cover art; among other artists)
- Wonder Woman: Our Worlds at War #1 (writer only) (2001)
- Worlds' Finest #9 (2013)
- World's Finest: Our Worlds at War (among other artists) (2001)

Covers only

- Action Comics #760 (Dec. 1999)
- Adventures of Superman #573 (Dec. 1999)
- The New Teen Titans: The Terror of Trigon TPB (2003)
- Infinite Crisis (2006; new cover art for dust jacket of hardcover edition)
- Star Trek / Legion of Super-Heroes, miniseries, #1–6 (2011–2012)
- Supergirl, vol. 4, #10 (June 1997)
- Superman vol. 2 #151 (Dec. 1999)
- Superman: The Man of Steel #95 (Dec. 1999)

==== Vertigo ====
- The Books of Magic Annual #3 (1999)
- Codename: Knockout #12 (2002)
- The Dreaming #55 (2000)
- Fairest #1–6, 15–17, 19–20 (2012–2013)
- Flinch #7 (1999)
- Ghosts vol. 2 #1 (2012)
- Heartthrobs #1 (1999)
- The Invisibles #17–19 (1996)
- The Invisibles, vol. 2, #1–8, 10–13 (1997–1998)
- Otherworld, miniseries, #1–7 (2005)
- Swamp Thing, vol. 2, #156 (1995)
- Transmetropolitan: I Hate It Here #1 (2000)
- Vertigo Resurrected #1 (2010)

==== WildStorm ====
- Planetary/Authority: Ruling the World #1 (2000)
- Heroes Vol. 1 (HC) (among other artists) (2007)
- Worldstorm #2 (Voodoo) (2007)

=== Marvel Comics ===
Interior art

- The Amazing Spider-Man #552–554, 565–567, 595 (2008–2009)
- The Amazing Spider-Man: Extra!, miniseries, #3 (among other artists) (2009)
- Amazing Spider-Man: Swing Shift Director's Cut #1 (2008)
- Angela, Asgard's Assassin #1–6 (2015)
- Astonishing X-Men #31–35 (2009–2010)
- Fearless Defenders #4 AU (2013)
- Free Comic Book Day 2007: Spider-Man #1 (2007)
- New X-Men #132, 139–141, 146–150 (2002–2004)
- Spider-Man: Origin of the Hunter #1 (2010)
- Uncanny X-Men #522 (2010)
- X-Men: Liberators, miniseries, #1–4 (1998–1999)

Covers only

- The Amazing Spider-Man #583 (Barack Obama cover) (2009)
- Marvel's Models Inc. #1 variant cover, in which Project Runway star Tim Gunn dons the Iron Man armor

Preceded by Marv Wolfman	Team Titans writer 1993–1994 (with Jeff Jensen)	Succeeded by n/a
Preceded by Eric Luke	Wonder Woman writer 2001–2003	Succeeded by Walt Simonson
Preceded by n/a	Superwoman writer 2016–2017	Succeeded by Kate Perkins
