= List of Top 10 characters =

This is a list of Top 10 characters. Top 10 is a comic book series published by WildStorm under their America's Best Comics imprint. All characters were created by Alan Moore unless otherwise stated.

The following list includes characters from the original twelve issue series that ran from 2000–2001, the five issue Smax miniseries (2003), and the five issue miniseries Top 10: Beyond The Farthest Precinct (2005).

== Officers ==
Top 10 is the tenth precinct in a multiversal police force. It is responsible for law enforcement in the city of Neopolis, where most citizens are superhuman, alien, robot, monsters, or magical beings of some sort. To police a city like this, extraordinary individuals are needed.

=== S.W.A.T. Team Leader Bill "The Wolfspider" Bailey ===
Leader (and apparently only member) of Top 10's SWAT team, Bailey is usually seen inside a multi-armed exo-skeleton and armed with a variety of hi-tech weaponry. Bailey lost his legs in a teleporter accident.

=== Officer Duane "Dust Devil" Bodine ===
A "techno-cowboy" with giant twelve-shooter revolvers and a partner to Shock-headed Pete, Duane is constantly exasperated by Pete's bigotry against sentient robots. He is a reluctant bachelor who is often shown to be afraid of his mother with ample reason, as she is a superhuman lie detector. Duane's mother's apartment becomes overrun with super-powered mice and cats. Duane attempts to solve the problem until cosmic powers erase the incident from everyone's mind (except the exterminator, who is now angry at not getting paid). Duane is seen flirting with Jack Phantom, even though he is aware that she is a lesbian and also outranks him. Professor Gromolko, while in custody, manages to grab one of Duane's guns and commit suicide. Duane takes this very badly.

Five years after the Ultima incident, Dust Devil's mother has died, and he finds solace in the arms of his new partner, Curlew, a female with bird features.

=== Officer Peter "Shock-headed Pete" Cheney ===
A bigoted officer with electric shock powers gained when ball lightning hit his family's still, Peter harbours a racist attitude towards Neopolis' robot minority. This brings him into conflict with fellow officer Joe Pi. He experiences much guilt after releasing a young prostitute (Immune Girl) who is subsequently killed by The Libra Killer. He is also reluctant to believe that The Seven Sentinels are in fact a pedophile ring. He is Dust Devil's partner. Five years after the Ultima incident, Pete is partnered with the Subliminal Kid.

=== Dispatcher Linda "Janus" Burnett ===
Janus is a woman with two faces from Grand Central (Precinct 1), a world where the Roman Empire never fell. Named after the Roman God Janus, her front face and her back face are in fact two separate people who even have separate boyfriends and occasionally squabble over how to do their job. "Back Jan" is once seen to cover for "Front Jan" when she had drunk too much the night before. Five years after the Ultima incident, Janus has quit over increasing aggression towards her, due to Major Cindercott's new rule of radio check-ins every quarter-hour. She returned to her home on Grand Central to enter the family business of dog breeding.

=== Sergeant Kemlo "Hyperdog" Caesar ===
A super intelligent, talking doberman in a man-shaped robotic exoskeleton, Kemlo is a humorous and kind individual, hiding his feelings of inadequacy at being a dog in a human world. Although he quells an objection by Girl One with a claim that he is not attracted to humans, he eventually falls in love with a former prostitute called Neural Nette and the two become intimate despite the species difference. Five years after the Ultima incident, Hyperdog and his wife adopt a young Anubis-headed girl named Cynothia Cephali. He eventually replaces Major Cindercott as head of Precinct 10.

=== Lieutenant Cathy "Peregrine" Colby ===
A born-again Christian with artificial wings (resembling The Falcon) and a powerful physique, Peregrine is married and, in Season Two, catches her husband "crossover-dressing" as a different superhero and insists he attend a rehabilitation clinic for 'identity crisis' sufferers with Sgt. Lopez. She suffered a broken rib arresting Andy 'Airbag' Soames when Soames inflated in panic and crushed her against a door. Five years after the Ultima incident, Peregrine was partnered with the Hoodoo Priest, but after seeing her personal Deity drunk and disorderly in a gods' bar, she had a crisis of faith and took some time off.

=== Detective John "King Peacock" Corbeau ===
King Peacock is a highly pious follower of the Yazidi religion and often referred to as a "Devil worshipper" by others. Able to perform superhuman feats and detect faults and weak spots (similar to Marvel's Karnak) by communing with his god, he is also an excellent hand-to-hand combatant. He is married with three children and is a good father and a loyal husband, albeit a conservative one. His partner is Synaesthesia Jackson. Five years after the Ultima incident, the Corbeaus have a fourth child.

=== Officer Willie "Stochastic Fats" Beaumont ===
Seen only in a dream of Jeff Smax and in the prose back up story in #1, Fats also has a brief cameo in the Smax mini-series. Fats was killed shortly prior to the events of issue #1 and replaced by Toybox. Fats was a jovial, overweight African-American officer and Jeff's partner and friend. He had the ability to sense or affect probabilities, giving him "hunches" that would always work out for the best. Despite this, he was shot in his home, later being discovered by his then-8-year-old daughter. It is remarked by Irma Geddon that Smax did not take his death well and in grief started a bar fight that ended in Officer Smax pulling the roof down on top of himself. Fats' death weighs heavily on Smax throughout the series.

=== Officer Alexei "Spaceman" Glushko ===
An alcoholic Russian telepath and former cosmonaut with a fondness for Vodka, Alexei lives with his intelligent telepathic Russian space chimp, Tanya, who is his friend and housemaid. His telepathy is often used in interrogating suspects. He may also be able to use his power to detect radiation.

=== Detective Wanda "Synaesthesia" Jackson ===
Synaesthesia is a sensible detective apparently considered boring by some of the officers. Her advanced synaesthesia leads into the realm of clairvoyance. She had a romantic relationship with Smax that ended badly, but later harbored an unrequited sexual attraction for her partner King Peacock. When Smax nearly went berserk after failing to protect Toybox from Ultima, Synaesthesia instinctively called him "Jeff, Baby" while calming him, suggesting she retains some strong feeling for him. Five years after the Ultima incident, she is romantically involved with her new partner, Saltator.

=== Doctor Sally-Jo "Micro-Maid" Jessell ===
The precinct's pathologist, who uses her powers to shrink in order to closely examine bodies, Sally-Jo became a pathologist to avoid giving bad news to patients and is overcome by nerves when she needs to tell Andy Soames he has S.T.O.R.M.S. She can also use her technology to shrink others, but rarely does (one occasion being when she shrank the drunk monster Gograh to prevent him damaging the Neopolis Police Station).

=== Sergeant Jackie "Jack Phantom" Kowalski ===
Jackie is a lesbian with the ability to turn insubstantial. Her partnership with Peregrine is strained by her partner's conservative Christian values. She shares a flirtatious relationship with Dust Devil although he realises nothing will come of it. Five years after the Ultima incident, Jackie is in a relationship with her partner, Panthalassa.

=== Officer Sung "Girl One" Li ===
A bio-engineered woman based on a collection of video game characters, created by a small group of rich friends, Girl One is superhumanly agile and fast and has chameleonic skin that disguises the fact she is actually naked at all times (not due to immodesty but simply for the sake of comfort). Kemlo, being canine, doesn't see color. His failure to inform her of this causes tension between the two, which he avoids by claiming not to be attracted to humans (although this is later revealed to be false). Girl One dies in battle against Commissioner Ultima. Her successor, Girl 54, appears in the Beyond the Farthest Precinct miniseries, her name as a reference to the cop show Car 54, Where Are You?. Her name and face were based on glamour model Sung-Hi Lee. The premise for the character, a superpowered bio-engineered woman, seems to be based on the Weird Science film that presented Kelly Le Brock as the creation of two adolescent kids. The film itself is based on a comic made by EC Comics.

=== Sergeant Hector "Monsoon" Lopez ===
Usually seen manning the front desk, Hector has weather control powers and wears an ill-fitting costume covered in isobars. Apart from booking criminals, little is seen of him, but he remarks to Jack Phantom that he's married after The Libra Killer tries to seduce him with telepathy. Hector retired from active field duty after a hip injury. That injury led him to join the Premise Keepers, a group led by James Eternity that claims to help heroes rediscover their true heroic identity.

=== Hostage Negotiator Harry "The Word" Lovelace ===
Harry wears a long black suit with a steel "neck-brace" that covers his lower jaw. His powers, to have people obey what he says, are the same as Jesse Custer from Preacher (whose power is called "The Word") and the same red font is used to show his power in use.

=== Officer Jenny "Multi-Woman" McCambridge ===
Jenny is an officer capable of generating several bodies at once, each with a different super-power, somehow connected to her chakras. Super-speed, flame-wielding, flight and becoming a giantess are among the abilities she has displayed.

=== Officer Joe Pi ===
Joe Pi is a robot (although he prefers to be called "post-organic" or "Ferro-American") who is extremely talented at his job and highly skilled at interpersonal relations. He replaces Girl One as Irma Geddon's partner after her death, to a cold reception from his fellow officers. His skill as an officer and his kindness with Irma's family however cause them to quickly become close friends. As a robot, he apparently experiences emotions but can not display them, and has a sardonic sense of humour. He frequently outsmarts and teases bigoted Officer Cheney much to the amusement of other officers. Using psychology, he convinces Atoman of the Seven Sentinels, a pedophile, to commit suicide after he and Irma agree that he will not receive a fair trial. He is modelled after 1970s Japanese anime about Super Robots, most notably Mazinger, though his head and name resemble Joe Pineapples from 2000AD's ABC Warriors.

=== Officer Robyn "Toybox" Slinger ===
A novice straight from the academy in issue #1, Robyn is the daughter of former Precinct 10 member Colonel Lilliput, who appears in The Forty-Niners. She carries a cubic box filled with elaborate, robotic "toys" built by her father, which are capable of various tasks. She has a troubled home life as she must take care of her elderly father who is suffering from Alzheimer's disease. She is partnered with Jeff Smax whose attitude doesn't help things for her, but the two eventually become close friends, with Smax eventually babysitting Robyn's father once in a while. Smax is driven into a rage when Commissioner Ultima goes on a rampage and buries Robyn under rubble. While trapped and injured, Robyn learns of a possible greater destiny from the precinct's local ghost, "the Rumor". Robyn accompanies Smax to his home dimension in the Smax mini-series. The intent was to attend the funeral of Smax's beloved dwarven uncle (he was adopted) but things go out of control. Robyn learns her arrival was predicted by an ancient evil called Morningbright and she must team up with Smax and many others to stop it.

While there, she has a brief affair with the elf that the quest bureaucracy mandates must be part of each questing party. She severs ties once she realizes he only wants a Green Card. It is also revealed she may or may not be of royal blood due to a reference to the Princess and the Pea fairy tale.

Despite Robyn's box of toys failing to work in this new realm, she becomes a vital part in the fight against Morningbright. This, of course, with the assistance of the elf, several dwarves, and Smax's sister, who is also his romantic interest (which is common in Smax's world). Robyn helps the two settle into a new life back in the Top Ten universe.

Five years after the Ultima incident, it is revealed that Robyn's mother was Pandora and it is her infamous box that contains her father's toys. After using all of her toys to distract the Hell Ditch Pilgrim, Andy Soames, she unleashes the lingering emotion of Hope to heal him. She was left without any notable abilities following the incident, save a lingering radiant halo, like Smax. This may be a result of visiting superspace or the doings of Andy Soames himself.

=== Officer Jeff Smax ===
Born Jaafs Macksun, Smax hails froma "Back worldly" parallel Earth, Earth-137 (so remote that it is not common knowledge that Earth designations "go that high") where magic replaces the common laws of science. Jaffs is the son of a travelling heroine who was imprisoned and raped by an ogre. His mother died giving birth to Jaffs and his twin sister Rexa and the children were raised by their father who physically and sexually abused them. Smax eventually killed his father as he slept and he and Rexa ran away. They were eventually taken in by the Dwarf couple Mack and Minka. To earn a living Smax became a dragon-slayer. He was highly successful until he failed to save a young princess from a near omnipotent dragon called Morningbright. After that he fled to Neopolis where he changed his name to Jeff Smax and became a police officer. Jeff is an obtuse and slightly dimwitted police officer ashamed of his background (which tends to make him highly intolerant of fantasy/magic-based Neopolis residents) and prone to violent rages. His first partner was Stochastic Fats who was killed in a drug bust. In Top 10 #1 he is curmudgeonly and hostile to his new partner Toybox due to his inability to deal with grief. Despite this rocky start he and Toybox became very close friends. After the events of the Smax miniseries he now lives with his sister/lover Rexa in Neopolis (claiming they look alike because they are the "same species"). Smax is about eight feet tall and muscular with blue skin and white hair. He is almost invulnerable, super strong and can fire a blast of energy from his chest. Five years after the Ultima incident, Smax lives in the city with Rexa. After saving Toybox from the Hell Ditch Pilgrim, he is left with a lingering radiant halo, despite his argument that he is not a saint.

=== Captain Steve "Jetman (formerly Jetlad)" Traynor ===
Steve Traynor is a veteran of the Neopolis PD. During World War II, at the age of 10, he was a daredevil pilot responsible for shooting down numerous German aircraft. After the war he was moved to Neopolis along with all other "science heroes" where he met Wulf. The two men became lovers and have apparently been together ever since, despite the fact that Traynor has still not "come out" about his sexuality to his fellow officers. He is one of the main characters of Top 10: The Forty-Niners. Five years after the Ultima incident, Traynor is fired from his position, succeeded by Major Cindercott and Hyperdog.

=== Officer Irma "Irma Geddon" Wornow ===
A stocky, middle-aged woman in a nuclear-armed battlesuit, Irma is a patriotic, working class police officer with a bit of a propensity for aggressive tactics (and lethal, radioactive force). She is married to Ron, a precog whose abilities prevent him from gaining employment for most of the series, though he eventually finds a job thanks to a suggestion from Joe Pi. They have two children Cherry Bomb and Cerebra. She was partner and a close friend to Girl One until her death and is then partnered with Joe Pi. Her grief over Sung Li's death makes her acceptance of her new partner very difficult but they eventually become friends. Five years after the Ultima incident, Irmageddon is briefly paired with Rexa Smax.

== New officers ==
The following characters were added by writer Paul Di Filippo for his spin-off series, Beyond the Farthest Precinct.

=== Officer Chelle "Curlew" Chambliss ===
Chamblis is Dust Devil's new partner. A bird-woman, her physiology does not display the ability to fly, in contrast to Peregrine, though she does have a sonic cry. She and Dust Devil eventually enter a sexual relationship after Bodine's mother passes away.

=== Major Sean Cindercott ===
Cindercott replaces Captain Traynor as head of Precinct 10. He is a cyborg whose torso resembles a Franklin stove. He issues numerous mandates that are restrictive and controlling of his officers, and he does not publicly interact with them, instead issuing commands via monitors, while watching everything going on in the station through closed-circuit television. He was placed in his position by Mayor Albert Famaile, in attempt to subvert dissidence in the populace and the police. He is transformed into a stone facsimile during the Hell Ditch Pilgrim case.

=== Officer Parsifal "The Hoodoo Priest" Congo ===
Hoodoo Priest is partnered with Peregrine. He has vast knowledge of religion and spirituality, believing that numerous deities and mythological figures are in fact the same entity viewed differently across multiple cultures. He calls on large spiritual avatars to perform various tasks, most often in physical confrontations. He knows of the Rumor, and is one of the few to believe Toybox's claims of having met him.

=== Officer "The Subliminal Kid" Luhan ===
The Subliminal Kid is a rookie partnered with Shock-headed Pete. His body appears organic, but his head is an oval-shaped television, which can show his thoughts and ideas as images. He can also create images, such as a hypnotic swirl to gain information from someone. His first name is not revealed.

=== Officer Paulie "Saltator" Oldwood ===
Saltator is partnered with Synaesthesia. The two eventually develop a romantic relationship, with prodding by Jack Phantom. He has significant strength and durability, seemingly able to leap great distances and fight hand-to-hand without any armor or protection. He appears to be modelled on a 'rocker' as he has long blonde hair, never wears a shirt, is shown sleeping with an electric guitar and, despite being a police officer, displays a rebellious attitude towards authority.

=== Officer Jenny "Panthalassa" ===
Jenny is partnered with Jack Phantom and the two share an intimate relationship. Aside from being a mermaid, Jenny also has hydrokinesis. Her restricted mobility out of water serves as a hindrance to her police duties, and she eventually gets a flying device to compensate, specifically to enable her to get in and out of their police cruiser. Her last name is never revealed.

=== Officer Rexa Smax ===
Rexa is Smax's twin sister and his lover. She was sexually abused by her father until Jeff killed him and they both were taken in by Uncle Mack and Aunt Minka. After the events of the Smax miniseries, she came to live with Jeff on the outskirts of Neopolis. She possesses the same super-human abilities as Jeff but her "Strong Light" (energy blast) is far more powerful. Five years after the Ultima incident, Rexa is an officer for Precinct 10, and paired with Irma for a brief time, eventually being partnered with the Hoodoo Priest. She and Jeff now live in a house in the city. While it was implied in Smax that Rexa and Smax would keep their family relationship a secret, in the new series, it is apparently common knowledge.

=== Dispatcher Tara ===
Dispatcher Janus has quit over increasing aggression towards her, due to Major Cindercott's new rule of radio check-ins every quarter-hour. She is replaced by Tara, seemingly a real manifestation of the Buddhist goddess Tara.

== Criminals and suspects ==
=== Gograh ===
An aging Godzilla and Gorgo analogue who rampages through Neopolis after his son Ernesto is taken into custody by Smax and Toybox. He is a drunk and carries beer trucks on his belt to drink from. He usually resides on "Monster Atoll" with other movie monsters. He resents the other monsters intensely and pines for the days when he was a big movie star.

=== Ernesto Gograh ===
An 8-foot-tall (2.4 m) reptilian gang member, Ernesto is very strong but does not appear to have the radioactive breath of his father, nor does he have his immense stature. He is the head of the Fabulous Five street gang. He has little respect for the police which leads to his arrest by Smax and Toybox. While in custody, he mentions an "Uncle Gojira" who was "dumb enough to fight (a) smog monster for ya", a reference to the many Godzilla films, as well as "Uncle Tom" actors in Kaiju.

=== The Ghostly Goose ===
The Ghostly Goose is an undetectable shapeshifter who uses his powers to fondle women. Believed captured by Jack Phantom, he actually escaped and was last seen as a chair in the station's cafeteria.

=== Professor Gunter Gromolko ===
Gunter Gromolko is a diminutive Nazi scientist who was granted immunity from prosecution after World War II for helping to build Neopolis (and remain among the other super-villains). He was seen in The Forty-Niners living a life of luxury until he tried to use time travel to change history and ensure the Germans won the war. In Top 10 he is seen making illicit drugs and commits suicide in custody with Dust Devil's 12-shooter to protect one of his clients (later revealed as Ultima). He is based on numerous mad scientists such as Doctor Sivana.

=== M'rrgla Qualtz, the Libra Killer ===
A former member of the Seven Sentinels (a Justice League analogue) as the Vigilante from Venus, Qualtz was a female analogue of the Martian Manhunter who retired from superheroics and used her telepathy and shapeshifting to become a porn star. After several years, she disappeared and it was later revealed that she had undergone a metamorphosis unique to her species. She became a gigantic, multi-eyed worm covered in monofilaments capable of slicing between atoms. Yearly she would exit the sewers of Neopolis where she hibernated and remove the heads of prostitutes to eat their pineal glands. The regular yearly appearance of these bodies was blamed on the "Libra Killer". She was arrested by a team of officers led by Jack Phantom. She ends up in a large, clear tube inside the precinct's holding cells. She manages to use her telepathy to try to trick other heroes into freeing her but these attempts are foiled. The Seven Sentinels promise to bring legal action on her behalf, but Qualtz is killed during the fight between the precinct's offices and Commissioner Ultima. It is implied, in part by Qualtz herself, that even if she had not been killed by Ultima the Seven Sentinels would have killed her, to ensure she would be unable to reveal their secret activities as a pedophile ring.

=== The Seven Sentinels ===
The Seven Sentinels are a group of nine, not seven, heroes who are exposed as pedophiles. They are: M'rrgla "Vigilante from Venus" Qualtz (based on Martian Manhunter); Craig "Atoman" Wallace (based on Superman); Laurence "The Hound" Lomax (based on Batman); Delia "Sun Woman" Spyros (based on Wonder Woman); Gilbert "The Black Boomerang" Marchioness (based on Green Arrow); James "The Scarlet Sceptre" Nile (probably based on Green Lantern); Perry "The Kingfisher" Somerville (probably based on Hawkman); David "Davy Jones" Jones (probably based on Aquaman); and "The Sizzler" Fields (first name unknown, based on The Flash).

=== Andy "Airbag" Soames ===
First appearing in issue #4, Soames is a married man who frequents prostitutes and is suspected of being the Libra Killer after one prostitute he visits (Immune Girl) is found dead. He discovers from Micro-Maid that he has S.T.O.R.M.S. (Sexually Transmitted Organic Rapid Mutation Syndrome) that may turn him into a non-viable organism. He may also have infected his loving wife Susan. Soames can inflate his body and is presumably an analogue of Bouncing Boy (even wearing a similar costume). Five years after the Ultima incident, Soames' S.T.O.R.M.S. virus has stabilized but mutated him into a new entity, the Hell Ditch Pilgrim.

==== Hell Ditch Pilgrim ====
A menace that first manifests itself as a giant, apocalyptic avatar in the sky, the Pilgrim quickly exerts his control over robotic intelligences through the "darkshot" drug. Soon, he begins possessing organic intelligences as well. He is eventually revealed to be a mutated Andy "Airbag" Soames, existing in superspace, an underlying reality giving him control of the entire multiverse. Toybox uses Pandora's box to give Andy hope and put him at eternal peace.

=== Commissioner Ultima ===
Commissioner Ultima was the supreme authority at Grand Central (Precinct 1, the same world Janus comes from), a parallel Earth where the Roman Empire never fell. She can travel between parallel worlds under her own power and fire energy blasts, and while her other abilities were not catalogued she was said to have enough power to destroy all of Neopolis and its citizens. Ultima had killed the drug runner Saddles in an attempt to get a unique radioactive drug that he had been transporting for Prof. Gromolko and it was Ultima who Gromolko feared when he killed himself. When Detective Corbeau travelled to Grand Central to investigate the case she had him placed in the gladiatorial games in an attempt to have him killed. When Detective Jackson realised Ultima was responsible and attempted to arrest her, Ultima attacked the police station and Girl 1 and M'rrgla Qualtz were both killed. While Smax held her off (getting badly beaten in the process) other officers gathered the drug she was after and Toybox used her automatons to inject it into Ultima causing her to overdose. As a final act Ultima brought down part of the station's roof burying Toybox alive.

== Other ==
=== Bob "Blindshot" Booker ===
A taxi driver who transported Toybox to Precinct 10 on her first day, Booker claims to have "zen senses", letting the car decide where he should go, and wearing a blindfold over his eyes (which may be sightless anyway). Of course, Booker suffers numerous auto accidents, but they seem to serendipitously affect events positively. Booker's remaining senses seem enhanced, perhaps alluding to the Marvel Comics character, Daredevil. Physically he resembles comedian George Carlin.

=== Mayor Albert Famaile ===
Five years after the Ultima incident, this talking baboon is instituting harsh new legislation, seemingly patriotic but also near-fascistic. Albert fires Captain Traynor to insert Major Cindercott, a man who agrees with his politics, and enforces his laws without question. He and Cindercott are transformed into a stone facsimile on the outside wall of a building during the Hell Ditch Pilgrim case.

=== Phillipe Jouet-Homme ===
Five years after the Ultima incident, Phillipe lives with Toybox in his apartment. A seemingly wealthy private citizen, Phillipe is not a flesh and blood humanoid like Robyn, but an android. His style of dress and accessory seem to indicate he is inspired by either Marvel's Arcade or DC's Toyman. He eventually cheats on her with another android. His last name is French for Man Toy.

=== Grease Monkey ===
Grease Monkey is a robotic chimpanzee seen in the station's "shop" repairing Kemlo Caesar's damaged exo-skeleton and also works on police vehicles as well.

=== Dr. Qubit ===
Five years after the Ultima incident, Qubit is Commissioner Ultima's replacement. For a more neutral leader, Qubit was selected as a member NOT from Grand Central. Aside from superior intelligence, his abilities seem to be a take off of the qubit's superpositioning quality, allowing multiple copies of himself, each displaying different moods and personalities, to perform numerous tasks at once.

=== The Rumor ===
Believed at first to be a running joke at the precinct, "the Rumor" was blamed for unexplained events or used as a transparent excuse ("I was waiting for the Rumor to show up"). When Toybox was trapped under a collapsed part of the station, however, he appeared to her as a translucent, featureless humanoid. Five years after the Ultima incident, the Rumor eventually reveals his ultimate role as multiversal "criticality adjuster", applying slight adjustments to pivotal moments to effect a positive outcome. He can access superspace, the underlying connective region of the multiverse, to traverse great distances. He knows about Toybox's origins, and knows she has some greater, unrevealed destiny to fulfill.

=== Sam "Colonel Lilliput" Slinger ===
Sam Slinger is a senile father of Robyn "Toybox" Slinger and former member of Precinct 10 (he is seen in The Forty Niners as having commanded an army of toy soldiers). After Robyn is injured by Commissioner Ultima, Smax helps take care of him. He is based on General Jumbo, a British character from The Beano. Five years after the Ultima incident, his Alzheimer's has progressed to where he is hospitalized and only occasionally visited by Robyn and the Rumor, who has promised Sam to help Robyn fulfill her destiny. His wife was apparently Pandora.

== The Forty-Niners ==
Top 10: The Forty-Niners is a prequel to the America's Best Comics series Top 10. It features several characters from the previous series, relatives of characters from the previous series and many new characters as well.

=== Main characters ===
- Steve "Jetlad" Traynor: Only ten when he first began flying fighters against the Nazis, Traynor is sixteen in this story. He makes friends with Leni early on and takes a job as a mechanic with the Skysharks. In the original series, he has grown up to become the Captain of Precinct 10.
- Leni "Sky Witch" Muller: A German pilot who rode a mechanical flying machine that resembled a broomstick, Leni defected to the United States due to her hatred of the Nazis. She joins the new Neopolis Police Department after encountering several officers, the Maid among them, at an incident at Scowling Joe's Bar.

=== The Skysharks ===
Skysharks are international team of fighter plane aces who fought for the Allies, inspired by the Blackhawks and Skywolf's team. Members include:

- John Sharkey: Leader of the Skysharks, Sharkey has a deep distrust of the robots and vampires and wants the military to take policing duties of Neopolis.
- Wulf: Twenty-five-year-old German Skyshark, Wulf becomes Jetlad's first and possibly only lover, as they are still together in the future of the original series.
- Lars: A Danish Skyshark with a crude sense of humor who shares Sharkey's views on robots and vampires.
- Pierre: A French pilot and great fan of Jetlad's, Pierre is still friends with Jetlad and Wulf in the future and probably knows about the nature of their relationship by that point.
- Tiki Face: A New Zealand pilot.

=== Police ===
- Zaran "Doctor Omega" Orval: The Doc is the progressive Captain of Neopolis's Police Department, understanding of new ideas, but stringent on the rules. As an alien champion, he is based on Superman (visually his Kryptonian father Jor-El from the Silver Age).
- Rocket Ryan: An officer with a rocket on his back, apparently had two side-kicks known as the "Time-Twins" that the Doc ordered him to downplay, due to rising concerns about the relationship between heroes and their sidekicks, as well as the dangers young wards were put in. He is from the 25th century (a reversal of Buck Rogers who awakens in the 25th century).
- Joanna "The Maid" Dark: A Joan of Arc-style officer with full chainmail and holy powers to determine the truth and bless things. She is considered the heavy artillery against the Undead, with her Holy Light emanating naturally from her costume. In addition to her sword, she also carries a globus cruciger which can enlarge to transport Joanna and her teammates as a pseudo-spacecraft.
- SteelGauntlet: Introduced as a disfigured scientist inside a heavy robotic suit of armor, he is similar to characters like DC's Robotman, but revealed to be the first fully intelligent robot.
- Sam "Major Lilliput" Slinger: Previously seen as "Colonel Lilliput", he is a senile father to Robyn "Toybox" Slinger, in the original Top 10 series. Looking like a foppish 18th-century French officer, he commands an army of mechanical toys (many more than Robyn has in the future, but seemingly less sophisticated).
- Ramon "Black Rider" Morales: Leni's partner, a Mexican-American sword-and-flintlock wielding biker.
- Adam "Spirit of '76" Pure: Partner to SteelGauntlet, the Spirit is a rather overbearing and prejudiced character, holding conservative views in contrast to Doctor Omega.

=== Minor characters ===
- Johnny "John Q Public" Genovese: The Mayor of Neopolis lacks the slick rhetorical skills normally associated with politicians, instead being blunt and uncompromising. He fears that the volatile experiment that is Neopolis will blow up in his face and his main concern is to keep his citizens from their natural tendency towards vigilantism so that the new police can keep order. The Q that is his crest looks strikingly similar to "Captain BBQ" hot dog chef seen in Precinct 10 in the future.
- Betty "Doesgood": New landlady of Steve and Leni, and one of the first residents of Neopolis, she came from a generation where the special people didn't have superpowers, as they simply stood out for being smart or funny. She gave advice and is eager to forget about those days. She is friends with Sloppy Sullivan and is very similar to early comic strip characters like Mary Worth. Betty owns a radio made out of the helmet of the Rocketeer, as alluded to her turning it off and exclaiming 'all that racket'.
- "Sloppy" Sullivan: The Skysharks cook and apparently the lover of Betty Doesgood.
- Laurence "The Newshound" Lomax appears here as a reporter, broadcasting on a bone shaped microphone. Many years later in "Court on the Street" he has become a wealthy owner of much of Neopolis and a leading member of the pedophile Seven Sentinels ring. Raiding his mansion with an arrest warrant, Duane Bodine calls out "You had the rep, you had the dough ... why risk all that, just for underage tail?"
