= Top 10 (comics) =

Comic book series

- Cover to issue #1 of Top 10, art by Alex Ross

Publication information
- Publisher: America's Best Comics (DC Comics)
- Format: Limited series
- Genre: Superhero
- Publication date: September 1999 – October 2001
- No. of issues: 12
- Main character: Smax

Creative team
- Written by: Alan Moore
- Artist(s): Gene Ha; Zander Cannon
- Letterer: Todd Klein

Collected editions
- Book One: ISBN 1-56389-657-5
- Book Two: ISBN 1-84023-482-2

Top 10 is a superhero comic book limited series published by the America's Best Comics imprint of WildStorm, itself an imprint of DC Comics. Written by Alan Moore and illustrated by Gene Ha and Zander Cannon, the series details the lives and work of the police force of Neopolis, a city in which almost everyone, from the police and criminals to civilians, children and even pets, has super powers and/or colourful costumes. It won the Eisner Award for Best Continuing Series in 2001.

The series led to the production of several spin-offs; Smax, which was set directly after the series' conclusion; Top 10: The Forty-Niners, which is set in 1949; Top Ten: Beyond the Farthest Precinct, which is set five years after the series' conclusion; and Top Ten Season Two, penned by Zander Cannon.

== Overview ==
The story revolves around the day-to-day lives of the police officers at the 10th Precinct Police Station and is similar in tone to classic television police dramas like Hill Street Blues, which Moore has described as an influence. The book also addresses a wide range of prejudices and issues, but with a science-fiction twist; monsters, robots and fantasy creatures often face the bigotry and problems faced by real-world human minorities.

The series includes several comic-book references and visual "sight gags" relating to the genre. For example, a caped street-corner watch-vendor uses a cardboard sign advertising "signal watches", and a hot-dog vendor cooks his wares with heat vision. One plotline involves a boy-band called Sidekix whose hit single is "Holy Broken Hearts" (a reference to the catchphrase format of DC Comics character Robin). Likewise, most advertising, signage and graffiti in the Top 10 universe contains references to the world of comic books and superpowers (for example, a clothing store called The Phonebooth, a reference to how Superman in early comics changed his clothes in a phonebooth) and crowd scenes usually feature many characters from sci-fi and comic books.

The primary Top 10 series was a 12-issue series between 1999 and 2001. Follow-ups included 2003's 5-issue miniseries spin-off Smax and 2005's graphic novel Top 10: The Forty-Niners. 2005 also saw the publication of Top 10: Beyond the Farthest Precinct, a 5-issue miniseries, written by Paul Di Filippo and illustrated by Jerry Ordway. Another 4-issue series, Top 10: Season Two, was published in 2008–09. It was written by Zander Cannon, Kevin Cannon, and Shadi Petosky, with art by Gene Ha. A single issue Special, set two weeks later, was also produced.

== Plot ==
=== Season One ===
==== Book 1 (issues #1–7) ====
Cover to the paperback collection Top 10 Vol. 1, art by Gene Ha

Fresh from the academy, Robyn "Toybox" Slinger is headed for her first day on the job at Precinct 10, home of Neopolis' finest. Despite a cold reception from her new partner Jeff Smax, Robyn quickly helps with investigating the scene of a homicide in the robot ghetto, Tin Town. The dead man, Stefan "Saddles" Graczik, leads the police to a known drug factory, headed by none other than Professor Gromolko, an original architect of the city. When a telepath is brought in to interrogate the evil scientist, the drug peddler shoots himself with Dust Devil's pistol.

The next day, Shock-headed Pete and Dust Devil discover the body of a local prostitute with her head severed, indicating the horrific "Libra" killer is back. Elsewhere, Detective Synaesthesia gets the idea to use zen taxi driver Blindshot to track down Marta "Boots" Wesson, girlfriend and associate of Saddles. Boots reveals that Gromolko had a special delivery for a unique client. At the museum hideout where Boots and Saddles had been staying, a metal canister is found containing some unknown, radioactive drug.

Back at the station, Hyperdog and Peregrine interview Annette "Neural 'Nette" Duvalle, a prostitute who was able to survive an encounter with Libra. She leads Hyperdog and Peregrine, along with Dust Devil, Shock-headed Pete and Jack Phantom, to the sewers near where she encountered her attacker. The police are able to arrest Libra, who is revealed to be former "science hero" M'rrgla Qualtz, an alien shapeshifter who assumed her natural form to feed during her metamorphic period.

==== Book 2 (issues #8–12) ====
Cover to the paperback collection Top 10 Vol. 2, art by Gene Ha

After Qualtz's arrest, several of her former Seven Sentinels teammates come to give her their support, as well as political and legal aid. Even as she professes her innocence, Qualtz continues to use her telepathic powers to try and trick officers into freeing her from captivity. Meanwhile, King Peacock travels to Grand Central, a parallel dimension where the Roman Empire never fell and is filled with countless Roman myth-based creatures. It was here that Saddles was to deliver the drug, but before Peacock can investigate anything, he is drafted into an inter-precinct gladiatorial contest due to a seeming bureaucratic oversight. Though he is victorious, King Peacock despairs that he had to assault and even kill fellow law officers.

Smax and Toybox are called to the scene of an apparent suicide, only to discover the victim, a sidekick boy band star, was murdered. Back at headquarters, the precinct welcomes Commissioner Ultima, visiting from Grand Central for an inspection. Detective James special senses reveal that Ultima was involved in the drug dealings, likely having King Peacock placed in the competition to keep him from investigating. Ultima goes berserk in resisting arrest, killing Girl One, M'rrgla Qualtz and injuring Toybox before she can be brought down by forcibly giving her the drug and causing her to overdose.

In the aftermath of the commissioner's attack, Joe Pi from Precinct 9 is transferred to replace Girl One. Despite the antagonism against Pi, both for the place he occupies and his "Ferro-American" heritage, he quickly establishes himself as a capable policeman. After some digging, Peregrine and Jack Phantom discover that Glenn "Bluejay" Garland, the murdered pop star, was connected to the Seven Sentinels. He was about to sell his life story just before being killed, and investigation into his and M'rrgla's past with the Seven Sentinels reveals the dark secret behind the group: the Seven Sentinels are not a superhero group, but a pedophile ring, having faked all of their famous battles and used the Young Sentinels (sidekicks) as sexual slaves. M'rrgla's old newsreels even contain clips of Sentinels being "serviced".

The precinct moves to swiftly arrest all the Sentinels, but their leader, Atoman, is tipped off. Locking himself in his Impregnium shielded lair, Atoman seems to be out of the reach of the law, and Irma Geddon laments that even if he were to be convicted, Atoman's long lifespan would allow him to walk free, even with consecutive murder charges. Joe Pi then talks to Atoman through an intercom and subtly convinces him to kill himself, rather than face trial, be stripped of his powers, and go to prison with revenge-seeking supervillains. As the events of the past few weeks wind down, Smax visits Toybox in the hospital, asking her to accompany him to his home dimension in order to attend a funeral; Hyperdog starts a relationship with Neural 'Nette; and Captain Traynor returns home to his loving partner, former Skyshark pilot, Wulf.

=== Beyond the Farthest Precinct ===
Five years after the events of the Smax miniseries, Precinct 10 is celebrating another year of hard work at their annual labor day picnic. The festivities are broken up by the appearance of a large avatar in the sky, nicknamed the Hell Ditch Pilgrim (after the supernatural crevice it appeared above). The next day, as new officers are paired with veterans, Toybox goes looking for the Rumor, anxious to thank him for rescuing her from Ultima years ago. She however cannot find him, but new officer Hoodoo Priest informs he knows of the Rumor and alludes to his divine role.

Officer Joe Pi is reconfigured as a lesser form to investigate a new strain of robot drug that seems connected to the Hell Ditch Pilgrim. After giving Joe Pi his new assignment, Captain Traynor is called to the mayor's office, where he is summarily fired and replaced with the more hawkish Sean Cindercott, who soon initiates a number of sweeping reforms, instituting radio check-ins every quarter-hour, less focus on street-level crime in favor of "rooting out subversive elements", no non-essential visitors at the station (meaning loved ones), mandatory overtime with base pay, no contact with the media, and ceasing of routine maintenance of officer's personal equipment. Finally, all officers are asked to sign a ten-page "loyalty oath". The officers are polarized by these decisions, with a large number signing a letter of resignation, until Hyperdog convinces them all to stay.

Joe Pi reports back, after accidentally having experienced the effects of the dark energy capsules firsthand. The "darkshots" create a direct mental connection between any cybernetic intelligence and an extra-dimensional entity. The drugs are being created in a federal lab called Project JOOTS, where Irmageddon's husband works. Irma's husband, Ron, explains the basic goal: the scientists are investigating "superspace", the underlying region that seems to bind all timelines in the multiverse. In superspace, dark energy is the force that holds the multiverse together, as well as having other properties. A robot worker, named Rikby-2001, has been using dark energy to create and distribute the drug, but he purposefully overdoses and transcends this plane rather than talk.

After the precinct thwarts a minor attack by a group of anarchic "derridadaists", they have to deal with the Hell Ditch Pilgrim spreading his influence and destructive insanity through all the entities in Neopolis, including fellow officers. While Cindercott wishes to make a beeline for city hall to protect the mayor, the officers know they have to attack the problem at its source: superspace, but without any means to breach superspace, they cannot fight the Hell Ditch Pilgrim, until the Rumor shows up. He informs Top 10 that Andy "Airbag" Soames, who five years ago contracted S.T.O.R.M.S. (Sexually Transmitted Organic Rapid Mutation Syndrome), was so radically altered by the disease as to become a creature capable of entering and controlling superspace. The Rumor says that Toybox is the only one that can harm Soames, because she carries her mother's gift: Pandora's Box. The Rumor helps the officers bridge the gap left by Project JOOTS technology and send Toybox into superspace. When Toybox faces Andy alone, she unleashes all of her toys to protect herself, and then reveals the final thing left in Pandora's Box that can heal Andy Soames desperate mind: Hope. Smax rushes through the makeshift portal to grab his partner, escaping just before the effects backlash throughout superspace.

A few months after the events of the Hell Ditch Pilgrim case, Hyperdog is Traynor's replacement as Captain of Precinct 10, Robyn Slinger is no longer Toybox, and the fascist Mayor Famaille and Major Cindercott are out of power, casualties of the reality warping by Andy Soames, who now peacefully overlooks Top 10 as they once again celebrate survival and hopeful perseverance in a crazy and confusing beautiful world.

=== Season Two ===
A new officer, Slipstream Phoenix, joins as well as Girl Two, who replaces Girl One. The new commissioner, David Moon Gilbert, enforces stricter regulations to the dismay of some officers. Irma Wornow is suspended for breaking the new regulations. Shock-headed Pete is dismissed after he destroys Joe Pi's body while attacking Slipstream Phoenix.

This season was originally intended to include eight issues and two specials. It was canceled in 2009 after four issues and one special, leaving the continuing plotlines unresolved.

== Spin-offs and other stories ==
=== Smax ===
- Smax, the comical 2003 mini-series by Alan Moore and Zander Cannon, took Smax, accompanied by his partner, Toybox, back to his home dimension, a world based on the conventions and clichés of fantasy. This was set immediately after the original series.

=== Top 10: The Forty-Niners ===
- Top 10: The Forty-Niners (2005), a graphic novel by Alan Moore and Gene Ha detailing the origins of Neopolis and the first officers of Top 10.

=== Deadfellas ===
- Deadfellas, a short story in which Neopolis's finest take on vampire gangsters, written by Moore and drawn by Cannon, that appeared in America's Best Comics 64 Page Special (and reprinted in the ABC Graphic Novel).

== Collected editions ==
The Top 10 series has so far been collected in:

- Top 10: Book One (issues #1–7)
  - Hardcover editions (ISBN 1-56389-657-5 & ISBN 1-84023-196-3)
  - Paperback editions (ISBN 1-56389-668-0 & ISBN 1-84023-275-7)
- Top 10: Book Two (issues #8–12)
  - Hardcover editions (ISBN 1-56389-876-4 & ISBN 1-84023-482-2)
  - Paperback editions (ISBN 1-56389-966-3 & ISBN 1-84023-518-7)
- Smax (issues #1–5)
  - Hardcover editions (ISBN 1-4012-0325-6 & ISBN 1-84023-862-3)
  - Paperback editions (ISBN 1-4012-0290-X & ISBN 1-84576-002-6)
- Top 10: The Forty-Niners
  - Hardcover editions (ISBN 1-56389-757-1 & ISBN 1-84576-069-7)
  - Paperback editions (ISBN 1-4012-0573-9 & ISBN 1-84576-149-9)
- Top 10: Beyond the Farthest Precinct (issues #1–5)
  - Paperback editions (ISBN 1-4012-0991-2 & ISBN 1-84576-298-3)
- Top 10 (issues #1–12)
  - Paperback editions (ISBN 1-4012-5493-4 & ISBN 978-14012-5493-3)
- Top 10 Compendium (Top 10 #1-12, America's Best Comics Special #1, Smax #1-5, Top Ten: The Forty-Niners, Top 10: Beyond the Farthest Precinct #1-5, Top 10: Season Two #1-4, Top Ten: Season Two Special #1)
  - Paperback edition (ISBN 1-779-51079-9 & ISBN 978-17795-1079-2)
