= Otherworld (DC Comics) =

- Front cover of Otherworld #1

Publication information
- Publisher: Vertigo
- Schedule: Monthly
- Format: Limited series
- Publication date: 2005
- No. of issues: 7 of a planned 12

Creative team
- Written by: Phil Jimenez
- Artist(s): Phil Jimenez; Andy Lanning; Jeromy Cox

Otherworld is a creator-owned miniseries by writer/artist Phil Jimenez released in 2005 and published by DC Comics's Vertigo imprint. The book as described by Jimenez is "The Real World meets The Lord of the Rings meets Tron". A web-based sequel/reimagining entitled The Wild Choir, began in 2022.

== Synopsis ==
Otherworld concerns a group of Los Angeles college students who find themselves on the front lines of a border war between realities.

== Plot ==
The story revolves around 19-year-old Siobhan Monyihan, a student at the fictional University of Los Angeles and the progressive lead singer of a burgeoning LA band, and her boyfriend and rival, Jason Ng. Siobhan is an incredibly powerful sorceress, descended from a mystic lineage millennia old, and alone holds the key to stopping the impending war in Otherworld, the Celtic land of magic and the dead. Drafted into the same conflict, Jason, a brilliant young man whose worldview is more clearly delineated in black and white, assumes control of the military forces of Siobhan's enemies, the Technocracy.

Siobhan and Jason are brought to the war in Otherworld by Cessaire, an ancient sorceress, who has abducted Siobhan and a number of her closest friends, along with unrelated Los Angeles bystanders into her magical realm. Half of the Angelenos, including Siobhan, end up in the Realm, a nation run by wizards and inhabited by legendary creatures. The others including Siobhan's boyfriend Jason, who she cheated on, are sent to the City, a technological land inhabited by cyborgs, who are not necessarily the villains Cessaire describes them to be.

Both nations of Otherworld believed themselves threatened with extinction by the other. After learning that her mentor Cessaire is not as benevolent as she first appeared, Siobhan overcomes her personality faults and gains skills as a sorceress and a military commander. She unites disparate groups of into an army. At the same time, bitter Jason, who has learned of Siobhhan's infidelity, takes over the City from its leader and becomes its Prime Director. The two cities then war with each other.

== Collected editions ==
| Title | ISBN | Release date | Collected material |
|---|---|---|---|
| Otherworld | ISBN 1-4012-1011-2, 978-1-4012-1011-3 | 2006 | Otherworld #1–7 |
