= Gene Ha =

American comics artist and writer

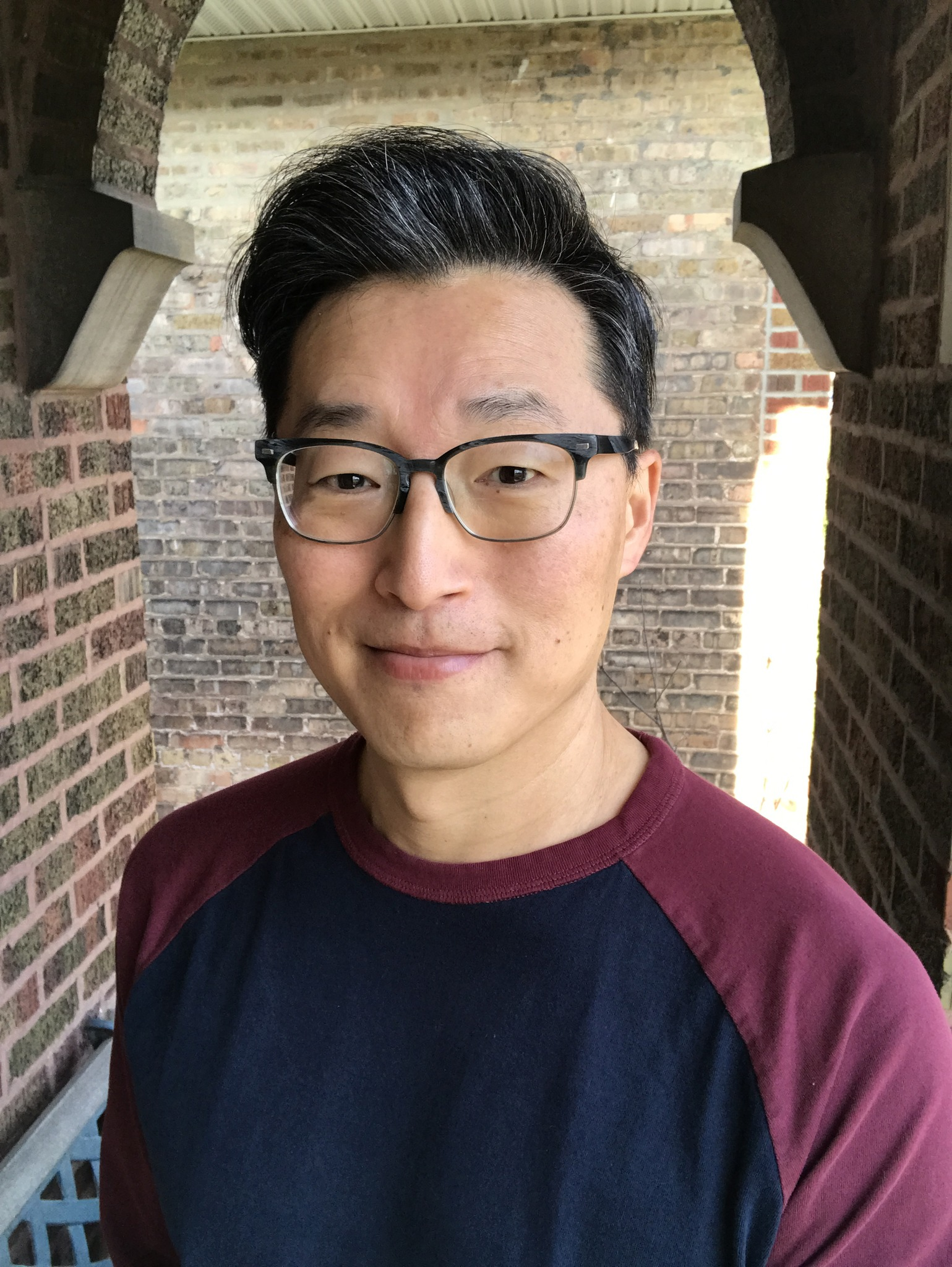
- Gene Ha in October 2024
- Born: Chicago, Illinois, U.S.
- Areas: Writer, Penciller, Inker
- Notable works: The Adventures of Cyclops and Phoenix; Top Ten
- Awards: 1994 Russ Manning Most Promising Newcomer Award; Five Eisner Awards; 2019 Inkpot Award

Gene Ha is an American comics artist and writer best known for his work on books such as Top 10 and Top 10: The Forty-Niners, with Alan Moore and Zander Cannon, for America's Best Comics, the Batman graphic novel Fortunate Son, with Gerard Jones, and The Adventures of Cyclops and Phoenix, among others. He has also drawn Global Frequency and has drawn covers for Wizard and Marvel Comics.

He was awarded the 1994 Russ Manning Most Promising Newcomer Award, and won five Eisner Awards, in 2000, 2001, 2006, 2008 and 2024.

== Early life ==
Gene Ha was born in Chicago and raised in South Bend, Indiana. According to Ha, his parents were well-educated Korean immigrants whose aspiration was that their three sons would obtain prestigious degrees and enter corresponding careers. Ha was the most introverted of his brothers, a "geek" who sought out escapist fantasy particularly through comic books. Whilst his siblings displayed impressive artistic talent, they lacked the patience to sit for hours on end applying themselves to illustration. Ha notes parallels between his generation of Asian-American comics artists and the generation of Jews creators from the 1930s, both of whom were children of immigrants struggling to fit into America.

Ha cites as his influences numerous creators from the 1980s, such as John Byrne, Frank Miller, Bill Sienkiewicz, Walter Simonson, Alan Moore, and most importantly Matt Wagner, whose Mage series Ha says is still "epic" to him, and its main characters "personal archetypes".

Ha took few classes in art, as he was only interested in drawing as a means of creating comics, and South Bend offered little in the way of education in realistic drawing. He began to truly understand graphic arts when working on his high school newspaper, The Clay Colonial, winning the Most Valuable Staffer Award, which was unusual for an artist. After high school, Ha attended the College for Creative Studies. In his last semester he sent drawing samples to Marvel and DC. Although he received a harshly critical response from Marvel, DC was interested and sent him a sample script.

== Career ==
Ha's first published comics work was in Green Lantern vol. 3 #36 (Feb. 1993), whose story, "The Ghost of Christmas Light", was written by Gerard Jones. He would draw a number of comics for DC and Malibu Comics, and did work for Marvel as well, illustrating the 1994 miniseries The Adventures of Cyclops and Phoenix, which documented the childhood of the character Cable. He would draw that miniseries' sequel as well, Askani'son.

Ha was one of the artists on the Shade limited series which spun off from the Starman series. He would subsequently illustrate a number of different properties for various publishers, including Aliens: Havoc, Superman, JLA Annual, which included interiors and cover work. In 1999, he began illustrating Top Ten, one of the series of Alan Moore's America's Best Comics imprint for Wildstorm. He would draw that series' twelve issues which ran until late 2001. Moore and Ha collaborated on the Top 10: The Forty-Niners graphic novel prequel published in 2005.

In 2002 Ha wrote "The Stronghold", an Iron Fist story published in Marvel Knights Double Shot #4, which represented his first published comics writing.

In 2006, Ha was set to serve as artist on the first four issues of a relaunch of Wildstorm's The Authority, with writer Grant Morrison. Ha drew two issues, but the project stalled after the second issue, as DC needed Morrison to concentrate his efforts on Batman rather than on Wildstorm projects.

In a December 2013 interview, Ha announced a sabbatical from work for hire comics and expressed his desire to focus on creator-owned projects.

In June 2015, Dark Horse Comics selected for publication Ha's creator-owned series Mae, which Ha funded through the crowdfunding website Kickstarter. The Mae fundraising campaign, which was for a 68-page Mae graphic novel written and illustrated by Ha, launched on April 24, reaching its $22,000 goal in 36 hours, and concluding with a total of $75,643. The book, however, will be published as an ongoing series rather than as a graphic novel. A portal fiction story, it depicts sisters Abbie and Mae, recently reunited following Abbie's disappearance eight years earlier into a fantasy world of monsters, who have followed her back to her world in pursuit of her. The series holds a 7.8 out of 10 rating at the review aggregator website Comic Book Round Up, based on 35 reviews.

In April 2022, Ha illustrated the second issue of Wonder Woman Historia: The Amazons. Written by Kelly Sue DeConnick, the three-issue limited series takes place before the birth of Diana and tells of the creation of the Amazons and how Hippolyta became their queen. The first Wonder Woman Historia: the Amazons issue was illustrated by Phil Jimenez and the third by Nicola Scott; an omnibus edition of the comics miniseries was released in June 2023.

== Techniques and materials ==
The variant cover for Justice League of America #11 (Sept. 2007) by Ha

Once Ha obtains a script, he makes "tiny" thumbnail sketches of each page, and then makes layout sketches on reduced copies of comic art board, two per page. It is at this stage that he works out the light/dark balance of the page. Though he says about 90% of his artwork are done without photo reference, he will sometimes photograph his friends posing as the central characters, or use a full-length mirror to draw himself. He renders minor characters from his imagination. Irrespective of how much sunlight he has on a given day, he prefers to use a 500W incandescent photo lamp, though he believes a 500W halogen lamp is also adequate. He prefers to use a lead holder with H lead for sketching, and 2B lead for shading, which he sharpens with a rotary lead pointer, believing that such leads can be sharpened better than a traditional pencil. He blows up a scan of each page layout to 8.5" x 11", and draws "tight" pencils on top of these, which are then scanned and printed on 11" x 17" inkjet paper in faint blue line. He prefers Xerox paper because he feels that the surface of marker paper tends to get smudgy or oily. When modifying art in his computer, he uses Photoshop.

To effect his current ink wash style of shading and inking, he uses a variety of warm grey Copic markers with wide and brush tips, in particular a 9W Copic Sketch brush marker. For outlines and precise shading effects he will use a variety of pencils, most notably a 2B pencil, and for highlights and corrections, he will use white chalk pencils and white gouache paint. He also uses Staedtler Mars technical pens.

When not doing painted covers, he also uses a Winsor & Newton Series 7 Size 1 brush, Badger Air Opaque airbrush paint, water-soluble ink wash and Strathmore Windmill vellum 100 lb. Bristol board. He cleans his brushes with Masters Brush Cleaner, to which he adds water for a gel consistency. He uses Photoshop to finish his work.

== Personal life ==
Ha and his wife Lisa live in Berwyn, Illinois.

== Awards and nominations ==
=== Awards ===
- 1994 Russ Manning Most Promising Newcomer Award
- 2000 Eisner Award for Best New Series (for Top 10, with Alan Moore and Zander Cannon, Wildstorm/ABC)
- 2001 Eisner Award for Best Continuing Series (for Top 10, with Alan Moore and Zander Cannon, Wildstorm/ABC)
- 2006 Eisner Award for Best New Graphic Album (for Top 10: The Forty-Niners, by Alan Moore, Gene Ha, Zander Cannon (ABC))
- 2008 Eisner Award for Best Single Issue (for Justice League of America #11: "Walls", by Brad Meltzer and Gene Ha (DC))
- 2019 Comic-Con International Inkpot Award
- 2021 Dick Giordano Humanitarian of the Year Award
- 2024 Eisner Award for Best Graphic Album—Reprint (tie): Wonder Woman Historia: The Amazons, by Kelly Sue DeConnick, Phil Jimenez, Gene Ha, and Nicola Scott (DC)

=== Nominations ===
- 1999 Eisner Award for Best Penciller/Inker or Penciller/Inker Team (for Starman #46)
- 2006 Eisner Award for Best Penciller/Inker (for Top 10: The Forty-Niners)

== Bibliography ==
=== Dark Horse Comics ===
- Mae #1–4 (2016)
- Oktane #1–4 (1995)
- The Real Adventures of Jonny Quest #8 (1997)

=== DC Comics ===
- Action Comics vol. 2 #3, 9 (2012)
- Batman: Fortunate Son HC (1999)
- Batman: Gotham Knights #13 (Batman Black and White) (2001)
- Blackest Night: Tales of the Corps #2 (2009)
- Celebrate the Century [Super Heroes Stamp Album] #2–3 (1998)
- DC Comics - The New 52 FCBD Special Edition #1 (2012)
- DC Universe: Trinity #1 (1993)
- Flashpoint: Project Superman #1–3 (2011)
- Green Lantern vol. 3 #36, 44–45 (1993)
- Green Lantern Corps Quarterly #8 (1994)
- JLA Annual #1 (1997)
- Justice League vol. 2 #7, 20 (2012–2013)
- Justice League of America vol. 2 #0, 11 (2006–2007)
- Phantom Stranger vol. 3 #6–7 (2013)
- Shade #1 (1997)
- Shade vol. 2 #12 (2012)
- Showcase '95 #11 (1995)
- Starman #46, Annual #2 (1997–1998)
- Superman vol. 2 #200 (2004)
- Superman/Batman #75 (2010)
- Wonder Woman Historia: The Amazons #2 (2022)

==== America's Best Comics ====
- ABC: A-Z, Top 10 and Teams #1 (2006)
- Top 10 #1–12 (1999–2001)
- Top 10 Season Two #1–4 (2008–2009)
- Top 10: The Forty-Niners HC (2005)

==== Vertigo ====
- Fables #52, 122–123, 150 (2006–2015)
- Fairest in All the Land HC (2014)
- House of Mystery vol. 2 #35 (2011)

==== WildStorm ====
- The Authority vol. 3 #1–2 (2006–2007)
- Global Frequency #12 (2004)

=== Malibu Comics ===
- Night Man #2–3 (1993)

=== Marvel Comics ===
- The Adventures of Cyclops and Phoenix #1–4 (1994)
- Askani'son #1–4 (1996)
- Marvel Knights: Double Shot #4 (2002)
- Shadows & Light #1 (1998)
- X-Men Annual #3 (1994)
- Young Avengers Special #1 (2006)
