= List of The Boondocks episodes =

The Boondocks is an American adult animated sitcom created by Aaron McGruder, and based upon his comic strip of the same name, that premiered on Adult Swim on November 6, 2005. The series begins with an African American family, the Freemans, settling into the fictional, peaceful, and mostly white suburb of Woodcrest from Chicago's South Side. The perspective offered by this mixture of cultures, lifestyles, social classes, stereotypes, viewpoints and races provides for much of the series' satire, comedy, and conflict.

During the course of the series, 55 episodes of The Boondocks aired over four seasons, between November 6, 2005, and June 23, 2014. The series also airs in syndication outside the United States and has been released on various DVD sets and other forms of home media.

== Series overview ==
Season	Episodes	Originally released	
Season	Episodes	First released	Last released
1	15	November 6, 2005	March 19, 2006
2	15	October 8, 2007	March 23, 2008
3	15	May 2, 2010	August 15, 2010
4	10	April 21, 2014	June 23, 2014

== Episodes ==
=== Season 1 (2005–2006) ===
No. overall	No. in season	Title	Directed by	Written by	Original release date	Prod. code
1	1	"The Garden Party"	Anthony Bell	Aaron McGruder (story); Rodney Barnes (screenplay)	November 6, 2005	103
2	2	"The Trial of R. Kelly"	Anthony Bell	Aaron McGruder (story); Rodney Barnes (screenplay)	November 13, 2005	101
3	3	"Guess Hoe's Coming to Dinner"	Anthony Bell	Aaron McGruder (story); Rodney Barnes (screenplay)	November 20, 2005	102
4	4	"Granddad's Fight"	Joe Horne	Aaron McGruder (story); Rodney Barnes (screenplay)	November 27, 2005	104
5	5	"A Date with the Health Inspector"	Joe Horne	Aaron McGruder (story); Rodney Barnes (screenplay)	December 4, 2005	106
6	6	"The Story of Gangstalicious"	Seung Eun Kim	Aaron McGruder (story); Rodney Barnes (screenplay)	December 11, 2005	107
7	7	"A Huey Freeman Christmas"	Seung Eun Kim	Aaron McGruder	December 18, 2005	109
8	8	"The Real"	Anthony Bell	Aaron McGruder	January 8, 2006	105
9	9	"Return of the King"	Kalvin Lee	Aaron McGruder	January 15, 2006	110
10	10	"The Itis"	Joe Horne	Aaron McGruder (story); Rodney Barnes (screenplay)	January 22, 2006	108
11	11	"Let's Nab Oprah"	Seung Eun Kim	Aaron McGruder (story); Yamara Taylor (screenplay)	February 12, 2006	112
12	12	"Riley Wuz Here"	Kalvin Lee	Aaron McGruder	February 19, 2006	113
13	13	"Wingmen"	Seung Eun Kim	Aaron McGruder	March 5, 2006	111
14	14	"The Block Is Hot"	Kalvin Lee	Aaron McGruder	March 12, 2006	114
15	15	"The Passion of Reverend Ruckus"	Sean Song	Aaron McGruder (story); Rodney Barnes (screenplay)	March 19, 2006	115

=== Season 2 (2007–2008) ===
No. overall	No. in season	Title	Directed by	Written by	Original release date	Prod. code
16	1	"...Or Die Trying"	Seung Eun Kim	Aaron McGruder (story); Yamara Taylor (screenplay)	October 8, 2007	205
17	2	"Tom, Sarah and Usher"	Seung Eun Kim	Aaron McGruder (story); Rodney Barnes (screenplay)	October 15, 2007	202
18	3	"Thank You for Not Snitching"	Seung Eun Kim	Aaron McGruder	October 22, 2007	203
19	4	"Stinkmeaner Strikes Back"	Seung Eun Kim	Aaron McGruder (story); Rodney Barnes (screenplay)	October 29, 2007	201
20	5	"The Story of Thugnificent"	Seung Eun Kim	Aaron McGruder	November 5, 2007	204
21	6	"Attack of the Killer Kung-Fu Wolf Bitch"	Seung Eun Kim	Aaron McGruder (story); Rodney Barnes (screenplay)	November 19, 2007	207
22	7	"Shinin'"	Dan Fausett	Aaron McGruder	November 26, 2007	208
23	8	"Ballin'"	Dan Fausett	Aaron McGruder (story); Jason Van Veen & André Brooks (screenplay)	December 3, 2007	209
24	9	"Invasion of the Katrinians"	Dan Fausett	Aaron McGruder (story); Rodney Barnes (screenplay)	December 10, 2007	212
25	10	"Home Alone"	Dan Fausett	Aaron McGruder (story); Rodney Barnes (screenplay)	December 17, 2007	214
26	11	"The S-Word"	Seung Eun Kim	Aaron McGruder (story); Rodney Barnes (screenplay)	January 21, 2008	213
27	12	"The Story of Catcher Freeman"	Dan Fausett	Aaron McGruder	January 28, 2008	211
28	13	"The Story of Gangstalicious Part 2"	Dan Fausett	Aaron McGruder (story); Rodney Barnes (screenplay)	February 4, 2008	215
29	14	"The Hunger Strike"	Dan Fausett	Aaron McGruder (story); Rodney Barnes (screenplay)	March 16, 2008 (Teletoon); June 10, 2008 (US, DVD); May 30, 2020 (Adult Swim)	206
30	15	"The Uncle Ruckus Reality Show"	Seung Eun Kim	Aaron McGruder (story); Rodney Barnes (screenplay)	March 23, 2008 (Teletoon); June 10, 2008 (US, DVD); May 30, 2020 (Adult Swim)	210

=== Season 3 (2010) ===
No. overall	No. in season	Title	Directed by	Written by	Original release date	Prod. code
31	1	"It's a Black President, Huey Freeman"	Sung Dae Kang	Aaron McGruder	May 2, 2010	304
32	2	"Bitches to Rags"	Young Chan Kim	Aaron McGruder	May 9, 2010	302
33	3	"The Red Ball"	Young Chan Kim	Aaron McGruder	May 16, 2010	306
34	4	"The Story of Jimmy Rebel"	Sung Hoon Kim	Aaron McGruder	May 23, 2010	303
35	5	"Stinkmeaner 3: The Hateocracy"	Sung Dae Kang	Aaron McGruder	May 30, 2010	307
36	6	"Smokin' with Cigarettes"	Sung Hoon Kim	Aaron McGruder	June 6, 2010	309
37	7	"The Fundraiser"	Sung Dae Kang	Aaron McGruder	June 13, 2010	310
38	8	"Pause"	Sung Hoon Kim	Aaron McGruder (story); Rodney Barnes (screenplay)	June 20, 2010	301
39	9	"A Date with the Booty Warrior"	Young Chan Kim	Aaron McGruder	June 27, 2010	308
40	10	"The Story of Lando Freeman"	Sung Dae Kang	Aaron McGruder	July 4, 2010	312
41	11	"Lovely Ebony Brown"	Young Chan Kim	Aaron McGurder (story); Rodney Barnes (screenplay)	July 11, 2010	311
42	12	"Mr. Medicinal"	Sung Hoon Kim	Aaron McGruder	July 18, 2010	313
43	13	"The Fried Chicken Flu"	Sung Dae Kang	Aaron McGruder	August 1, 2010	315
44	14	"The Color Ruckus"	Young Chan Kim	Aaron McGruder	August 8, 2010	314
45	15	"It's Goin' Down"	Sung Hoon Kim	Aaron McGruder	August 15, 2010	305

=== Season 4 (2014) ===
No. overall	No. in season	Title	Directed by	Written by	Original release date	Prod. code	US viewers (millions)
46	1	"Pretty Boy Flizzy"	Hea Young Jung	Angela Nissel	April 21, 2014	404	2.99
47	2	"Good Times"	Dae Woo Lee	Rodney Barnes (story); Angela Nissel (screenplay)	April 28, 2014	401	2.27
48	3	"Breaking Granddad"	Dae Woo Lee	Rodney Barnes (story); Angela Nissel (screenplay)	May 5, 2014	402	2.19
49	4	"Early Bird Special"	Hea Young Jung	Angela Nissel	May 12, 2014	410	2.19
50	5	"Freedom Ride or Die"	Kwang Il Han	Rodney Barnes	May 19, 2014	403	1.93
51	6	"Granddad Dates a Kardashian"	Kwang Il Han	Angela Nissel	May 26, 2014	407	1.96
52	7	"Freedomland"	Dae Woo Lee	Rodney Barnes	June 2, 2014	409	1.90
53	8	"I Dream of Siri"	Hea Young Jung	Angela Nissel	June 9, 2014	408	1.91
54	9	"Stinkmeaner: Begun the Clone War Has"	Kwang Il Han	Angela Nissel	June 16, 2014	406	1.93
55	10	"The New Black"	Dae Woo Lee	Rodney Barnes	June 23, 2014	405	1.82
