= The Fried Chicken Flu =

- The Boondocks episode
- Episode no.: Season 3 Episode 12
- Written by: Aaron McGruder
- Production code: 315
- Original air date: August 1, 2010

Guest appearance
- Marion Ross as Ms. Von Hausen

Episode chronology
← Previous "Mr. Medicinal"	Next → "The Color Ruckus"
- The Boondocks (season 3)

"The Fried Chicken Flu" is the 12th episode of the third season of the American animated television series The Boondocks, and the 42nd episode overall. It originally aired in the United States on Cartoon Network's programming block Adult Swim on August 1, 2010, and Centric on November 15, 2010. In the episode, the Freemans must survive in a post-apocalyptic world, after a virus originating from fried chicken erupts across the country.

The episode was written by series creator Aaron McGruder and directed by Sung Dae Kang. The episode's plot makes references to the 2009 flu pandemic, as well as a controversial Kentucky Fried Chicken-Oprah Winfrey promotion for the former's then-new Kentucky Grilled Chicken products. The episode features Marion Ross guest-starring as Ms. Von Hausen, a resident of Woodcrest. The episode received mixed reviews from critics, who compared its overall quality to an episode from the show's first season.

== Plot ==
Robert and Riley are eagerly watching TV coverage about the latest special at Kernel's Fried Chicken, a new type of chicken with 13 herbs and spices, as Huey and Jazmine Dubois are busy testing out a generator in the Freemans' garage. The generator malfunctions and cuts the power, causing an infuriated Robert and Riley to leave for KFC to buy chicken. Huey explains that he has been testing the generator as a part of his survival plan for his family, in the event that a pandemic sweeps the nation. Jazmine asks if she can be included in the plan as well, and eventually convinces a reluctant Huey to do so.

At KFC, Robert and Riley wait for hours in the drive-thru line, only to discover that the restaurant has run out of chicken, prompting the customers to riot. Robert and Riley return home and watch the news, learning that KFC's nationwide have been running out of chicken, resulting in civil unrest. Simultaneously, cases of a novel virus have been reported affecting KFC customers by the thousands, which the media dubs the "fried chicken flu.” Further news reports reveal the virus to originate from various other chicken franchises and predict apocalyptic casualty rates, triggering mass hysteria and resulting in shortages of food, water, and power.

Huey puts his plan in effect, but his instructions are ignored by his family, who fear the worst. The next day, Thugnificent and his roommate Leonard (who bring Wendy's), Robert's friend Tina, and Jazmine's parents Tom and Sarah, all take refuge in the house, though the food and water supply can only support four. Huey finally gets his generator to work and restores power to the house. This does not last long, as the group quickly burns through it. Uncle Ruckus tips off the residents of Woodcrest, who have formed a vigilante militia, about the Freemans' supplies, and they demand access, before being driven off with homemade tear gas.

Things turn worse when Tom contracts the flu after eating buffalo wings given to him by Leonard, who misunderstood the name and did not realize they contained chicken. Leonard is ejected from the group, along with Thugnificent and Tina, after Robert catches them in bed together. The remaining six realize that they must evacuate the house, packing supplies and a quarantined Tom in Robert’s car just as the Woodcrest militia returns, armed with gas masks and armor. The Freemans and Dubois are chased by the militia in Ruckus' bus, until Thugnificent uses his UPS delivery truck to ram the bus off the road, allowing the group to escape.

Outside a KFC, a news crew reports that the entire situation has been exaggerated: no deaths have been reported from the "fried chicken flu," which proves to be only a widespread salmonella outbreak. However, the news travels slowly due to power outages caused by the disorder. The news report is interrupted when the Freemans's car crashes through the doors of the KFC, mirroring a previous scene in the episode. Exhausted, Robert and Riley finally order their chicken meal before passing out.

== Production ==
Originally entitled "Kentucky Fried Flu", the episode was written by Aaron McGruder and directed by Sung Dae Kang. In an interview preceding the season 3 premiere of The Boondocks, McGruder stated that this episode would most likely get him into a lawsuit.

== Cultural references ==
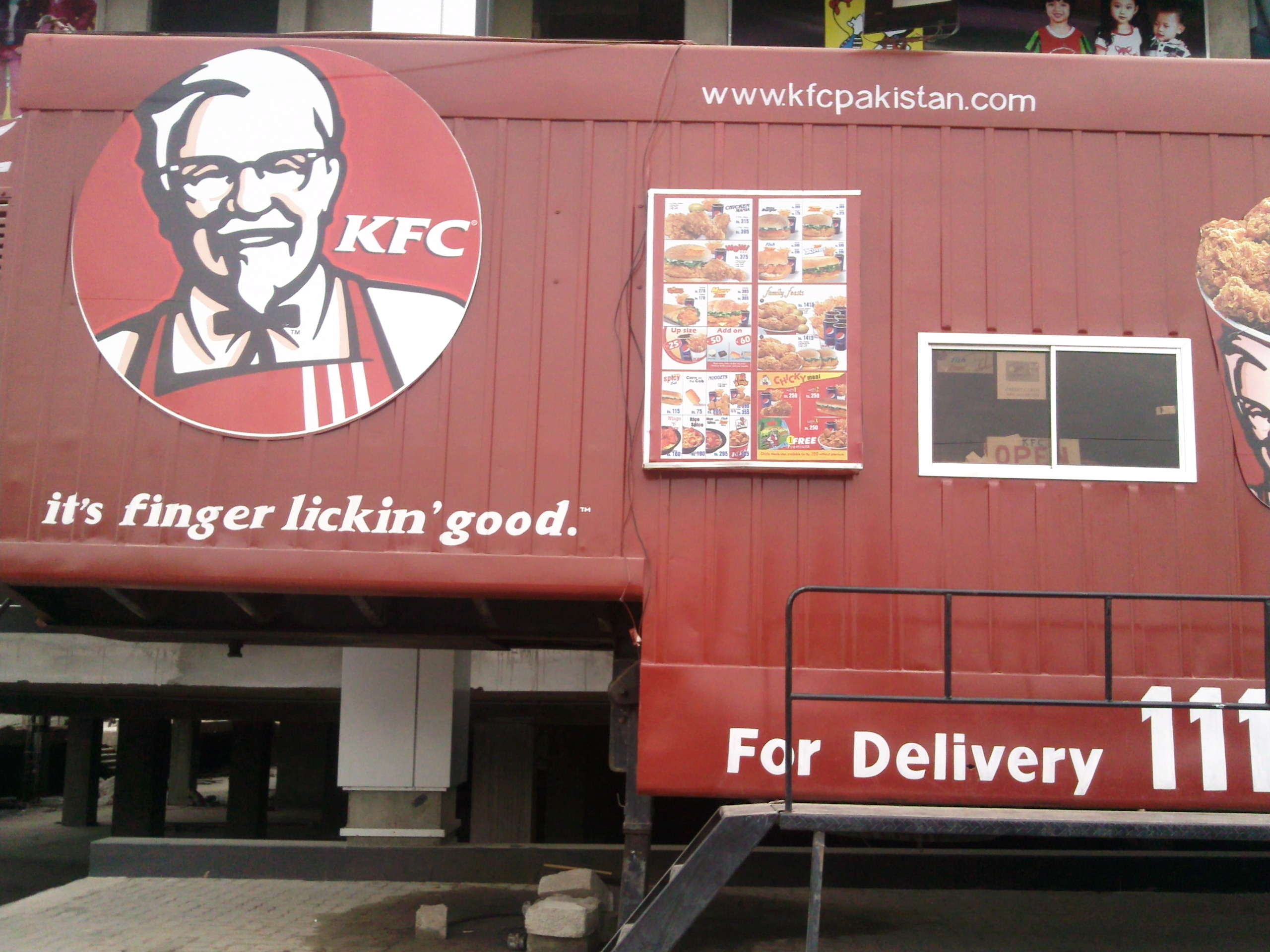
Fast food restaurant Kentucky Fried Chicken is heavily referenced in the episode.

"Kernel's Fried Chicken" is a reference to fast food restaurant Kentucky Fried Chicken. Both restaurants have the same acronyms, and many aspects of "Kernel's Fried Chicken" are based on the real-life Kentucky Fried Chicken, such as the designs of their restaurant buildings, their employees' uniforms, and even their slogan. The episode also references Kentucky Fried Chicken's controversial promotion for their Kentucky Grilled Chicken. Free coupons could be printed out on the website of talk show host Oprah Winfrey, who had partnered with KFC.

The real-life promotion resulted in shortages of grilled chicken at KFC restaurants, resulting in a sit-in protest at one Manhattan store. Other fried chicken restaurants parodied in the episode include Popeyes, Church's Texas Chicken, and Chick-fil-A as “Blutos”, “Temple’s Chicken”, and “Chick-le-Fait”, respectively.

The "fried chicken flu" pandemic is a reference to the 2009 swine flu pandemic. Granddad mentions the swine flu pandemic directly in the episode. The episodes features a satirical animation of American president Barack Obama, voiced by Marlin Hill, twice in the episode, giving addresses to the people of the United States.

The final chase scene includes multiple references to the Mad Max films. When the Woodcrest Fried Chicken Flu Militia shows up to demand the food and water that Huey has stashed away in his house, one of the Militia Members is dressed like Lord Humungus, with face mask and bare-chested leather straps. As the Freeman family escapes the house with their food and water tied on top their car, Aunty Entity's hairstyle and large earrings, from Mad Max Beyond Thunderdome, are worn by the Woodcrest Militia leader Betty von Heusen as she orders her gang to get on a school bus to give chase.

== Critical reception ==
Leonard Pierce of The A.V. Club graded the episode a B, writing that although "once the episode finally kicked into high gear at the end it was excellent", it overall "lacked punch" and "was more reminiscent of the slow-building, leisurely comedy of The Boondocks' first season than the rapid-fire, high-octane excellence of season three."
