= Return of the King (The Boondocks) =

- The Boondocks episode
- Martin Luther King Jr. speaking at a church party
- Episode no.: Season 1 Episode 9
- Directed by: Kalvin Lee
- Written by: Aaron McGruder
- Production code: 110
- Original air date: January 15, 2006

Guest appearance
- Kevin Michael Richardson as Dr. Martin Luther King Jr.

Episode chronology
← Previous "The Real"	Next → "The Itis"
- The Boondocks (season 1)

"Return of the King" is the ninth episode of the first season of the animated television series The Boondocks. The episode was written by series creator Aaron McGruder and directed by Kalvin Lee, and originally aired in the United States on Cartoon Network's late-night programming block Adult Swim on January 15, 2006.

The episode's name is a reference of The Lord of the Rings volume The Return of the King. The episode won a Peabody Award in 2006.

== Plot ==
The episode begins with two epigraphs:

I want young men and young women who are not alive today to know and see that these new privileges and opportunities did not come without somebody suffering and sacrificing for them.

— Dr. Martin Luther King Jr.

Whatever, nigga.

— Anonymous

Huey Freeman narrates an alternate version of history in which Martin Luther King Jr. survived his assassination attempt on April 4, 1968, but fell into a 32-year coma. Awakening in October 2000, he experiences a resurgence of popularity and signs a deal to write his autobiography. He shows up to vote for the 2000 U.S. presidential election, but is "turned away due to voting irregularity".

A biopic based on King's life is released a week and a half after the September 11 attacks, and becomes a box office flop as a result. During an appearance on Politically Incorrect, King states that the teachings of his Christian faith require him to "turn the other cheek", even with respect to enemies such as al-Qaeda. His commentary draws severe scorn from major news outlets and the White House, and his popularity plummets.

During a book signing in Woodcrest attended by no one, Huey and Robert Freeman meet King. Robert had participated in the Montgomery bus boycott, but has harbored a long-standing grudge against Rosa Parks because she received all the attention for refusing to give up her seat when Robert was sitting next to her, too, neither arrested nor acknowledged the same way Parks was. Huey and Robert offer to let King stay with them while he is in town. Following an uneasy family dinner with King, Tom DuBois, and Uncle Ruckus as guests, Huey and King watch television together and King bemoans the state of black popular culture. Huey tells him that the deterioration occurred because the culture was waiting for King or another strong leader to emerge.

The next day, Huey persuades King to try and reach out to the public again, this time by starting a political party. King tries to explain its principles on a talk show, only to be repeatedly cut off by the host until Huey throws a chair at him. Huey and King next decide to spread the word by going door to door, but King hires an event promotions firm to publicize a planning meeting for the party without telling Huey. The meeting becomes a raucous event, filled with dozens of young black attendees and performers behaving as though they are at a nightclub. Shocked and disgusted by the crowd's poor behavior, King launches into a furious tirade that stuns them into silence. He sharply castigates them for falling victim to the worst stereotypes about their race after the civil rights movement did so much to give them the opportunity to better themselves, and ends by announcing his plans to relocate to Canada.

King thanks Huey for trying to help, tells him to do all he can, and leaves. It is the last time that Huey sees him alive. Word of King's speech begins to spread, sparking a national uprising among black citizens that profoundly affects their culture. The front page of a November 2020 newspaper shows that Oprah Winfrey has just been elected President of the United States, while a subheading reveals that King has died in Vancouver at the age of 91.

Huey's final comment is "It's fun to dream", indicating that the entire episode has been his imagining of how history might have unfolded if King had not died in 1968.

== Controversy ==
"Return of the King" was the most controversial episode of The Boondocks's first season. The episode received criticism from Al Sharpton for depicting Martin Luther King Jr. using the term "nigga". He demanded an apology from Aaron McGruder and Cartoon Network, stating "Cartoon Network must apologize and also commit to pulling episodes that desecrate black historic figures. We are totally offended by the continuous use of the n-word in McGruder's show."

Cartoon Network replied by releasing a statement saying, "We think Aaron McGruder came up with a thought-provoking way of not only showing Dr. King's bravery but also of reminding us of what he stood and fought for, and why even today, it is important for all of us to remember that and to continue to take action." McGruder himself responded to Sharpton's criticism in The Boondocks comic strip, by having the characters ridicule the activist's choice to attack a cartoon over other, more relevant issues. The characters in the strip never specify the cartoon to which they are alluding.

The incident was later referenced in the Boondocks episode "The Block Is Hot". While Huey listens to an internet radio-station, the broadcaster mentions Sharpton: "Folks, this heat will not let up, it is hot! Speaking about hot, Al Sharpton is hot right now. Havin' a big ole protest. Seems his anger again has something to do with... I think it's a cartoon this time..."

== See also ==
- List of The Boondocks characters
