= Huey Freeman =

Fictional character from The Boondocks

- The Boondocks character
- Huey Freeman as he appears in the first season of the television series
- First appearance: "The Garden Party" (2005)
- Last appearance: "The New Black" (2014)
- Created by: Aaron McGruder
- Voiced by: Alicia Keys (pilot); Regina King (series)

In-universe information
- Species: Human
- Gender: Male
- Relatives: Riley Freeman (brother); Robert Freeman (grandfather); Cookie Freeman (great aunt); Jericho Freeman (fourth cousin)
- Nationality: American

Huey R. Freeman is the main protagonist and narrator of The Boondocks syndicated comic strip written by Aaron McGruder, as well as the animated TV sitcom of the same name. Politically sapient and borderline militant, Huey, being a self-described revolutionary left-wing radical, regularly reflects upon current events as well as the plight of African-Americans as it relates to a greater American society. As presented by his logical and rational personality, Huey's character has often been described as "misanthropic" and "cynical". He is named after Huey P. Newton, one of the co-founders and leaders of the Black Panther Party, and is voiced by Regina King. In the original pilot, he was voiced by singer Alicia Keys.

Huey and his younger brother Riley (also voiced by King) grew up on the South Side of Chicago and moved with their grandfather Robert Jebediah Freeman miles away to the peaceful, predominantly white suburb of Woodcrest in Illinois. It is strongly suggested that the boys' birth parents are deceased.

== Personality ==
Huey is an African-American, 10-year-old boy who recognizes and detests the absurdities and injustices (both obvious and perceived) of the society in which he lives. The charismatic side of his mentality and persona involves having logic, rationalism and intelligence, but his subversive side also involves cynicism, skepticism, and criticism that often touches upon controversial subjects such as politics, religion, the media, businesses and corporations, African-American culture and American society as a whole, often in either facts or opinions. Huey is also seen quoting Khalil Gibran from time to time which shows his interest in poetry too.

Tending to be obstinate in both manner and speech, Huey has demonstrated a depth of understanding that would seem to surpass his young age, such as knowing roughly what is going to happen in the future based on the actions and personalities of the people involved. For example, in "The Fundraiser", Huey accurately predicts what will become of Riley's candy-selling racket, going so far as to give him a bulletproof vest that eventually saves his life. Oratorically gifted, Huey has shown the ability to seize and hold the attention of entire crowds of people when he wants to do so. He uses this gift during individual interactions as well, during which he can gain a desired effect depending on his intention. In "The Red Ball", he is also shown to understand and speak Mandarin.

Huey is depicted as owning a large collection of books and other reading materials, as he often reads the newspaper, watches the televised news and otherwise makes a point to keep up with current events. Huey seems to show some fondness for Star Wars, and quotes the series often. In "Return of the King", he mentions Oprah Winfrey, saying, "we can only hope", and in "The Story of Gangstalicious Part 2", he states that he likes Elton John. On at least one occasion, he demonstrated an aptitude for writing in the form of script writing (he wrote a play entitled The Adventures of Black Jesus in "A Huey Freeman Christmas"). He has also written poignant letters and emails to public figures imploring them to support various political causes. He has started petitions, made and handed out flyers, and created and edited his own newspaper titled The Free Huey World Report. He uses such media to express his own opinions and ideas, though their impact is generally limited given their logical nature and his minimal resources.

Shown to be a highly skilled martial artist, Huey often demonstrates on various occasions an ability with nunchaku, katana, Gun (staff), as well as hand to hand combat that far surpasses the expected capabilities of a ten-year-old. Though he has won several fights against Riley, a pair of theater guards, Stinkmeaner on one occasion (though with the help of his grandfather and brother), Ming on another occasion, a pair of guards, a Conservative talk-show host in "Return of the King", in the Season 4 episode, "Freedomland," Ed Wuncler Jr. in the same episode, and his former friend Cairo on another occasion, he has been defeated several times (Stinkmeaner, Bushido Brown, Luna, Stinkmeaner's crew, and Uncle Ruckus) His fight with Bushido Brown ended with him knocked out (Bushido Brown left to protect his ward Oprah Winfrey), Luna was a Kumite fighter and a White Lotus expert, and Stinkmeaner was at the time, a supernatural presence. And though Uncle Ruckus beat Huey the first time it is not shown who won the rematch; the beginning of the fight was the end of the episode. He also fought a few of Winston Jerome's men. In "A Date With the Booty Warrior" it was mentioned that he and Riley were in a fight with five other boys, in which their principal was severely injured because he "got in the way", the fate of the other five boys wasn't shown but he and Riley appeared completely uninjured. Huey regularly beats Riley with ease in their fights despite the fact Riley often uses objects such as frying pans, or golf clubs in their fights showing Huey is very disciplined and skilled against armed opponents.

In the Season 1 episode "The Real," Huey has several encounters with an undercover government spy, whom he dubs "The White Shadow." At the end of the episode he is left uncertain whether these encounters were real. The man reappears in the Season 3 finale "It's Goin' Down" to warn Huey that government agents actually are on their way to Woodcrest to apprehend him, forcing him into a desperate attempt to flee the city.

Huey seen praying in the season one finale

Huey does not consider himself to be religious and has mentioned so several times in the comics. Nevertheless, he very passionately insists that Jesus Christ was black and US president Ronald Reagan is the Devil. As of the third season of the series, the only support he has explicitly given to this theory is that many individuals of African descent lived in the Middle East during the time of Christ, which further broadens his apparent sphere of knowledge.

Huey is shown to admire several historical figures. In "The Return of the King" he is the only person who still looks up to Martin Luther King Jr. after King awakens from a 32-year coma and is misconstrued by the public as a terrorist sympathizer. As mentioned before, Huey is named after Huey P. Newton, the co-founder of the Black Panthers. During "The Story of Gangstalicious Part 2" Huey states that Muhammad Ali is a hero of his. He also has many posters of King, Che Guevara, Malcolm X and Hugo Chavez. Three figures he has quoted before are Langston Hughes, Karl Marx, and Khalil Gibran.

While Huey is always portrayed as being a left-wing radical, his specific political ideologies are more logical and less radical than other characters portray them as. On several occasions, such as "The Block is Hot," he has demonstrated a following of revolutionary socialism. This is also backed up because Huey has posters of revolutionary socialists in his room. A belief in anarchism is also plausible, as several of his statements have paid respect to it, however this is not confirmed. In "Or Die Trying..." he teaches a theater ticket taker about anarcho-syndicalism and Marxism. However, a moderate belief in Black nationalism is common, since a desire for a greater unity between the black people of America is a recurring theme. Huey has also quoted Karl Marx, suggesting an understanding of communism. In "The Real" Huey claims to be the founder of 23 radical leftist organizations, including the Black Revolutionary Organization or B.R.O., Africans Fighting Racism and Oppression or A.F.R.O., and the Black Revolutionary Underground Heroes, or B.R.U.H. In terms of public opinion, the national media within the Boondocks' universe often labels Huey as a "domestic terrorist" throughout various newscasts seen during the third season.

The only deep insight in Huey's spiritual beliefs is when he believed an innocent man on death row, whose release Huey had worked for, was about to be executed ("The Passion of Reverend Ruckus"). Alone in a field, Huey dropped to his knees and sobbed as he offered up prayers to God; almost simultaneously, a bizarre chain of events led to the man's sentence being commuted by the governor. Upon learning of this, Huey says:

Maybe there are forces in the universe we don't understand. But I still believe we make our own miracles.

Being both disillusioned as well as possessing an extremely logical view of the world, Huey is rarely seen smiling in the episodes. He is either in a neutral expression or is seen frowning or shrugging. In season one, Huey was seen smiling when he defeats his brother Riley and in "The Passion of Reverend Ruckus" when he asks Jazmine to come with him to prison (though the smile is quickly replaced with anger toward Jazmine) and twice in "The Block is Hot" when he set up his soap box and when he watched Jazmine speak with Ed Wuncler Sr. In season two, he is seen smiling four times. Twice was in episode "Home Alone" when he nearly cuts Riley and at the end when Granddad returns home after his trip to Costa Rica. The third and fourth are in episode "Ballin'" when Riley finally insults the opposing team's star player enough to make her cry. After scoring multiple baskets, Huey is seen smiling at his brother along with Granddad. He is also seen smiling during the timeout that Tom called to congratulate the team on their playing. Other than four instances, Huey has never been caught smiling. This isn't to say that Huey lacks a softer side, as he will take steps to help and protect those he considers friends or family (ex. Caesar, Tom, Riley, etc.).

It is heavily implied that Huey is a vegetarian. He is rarely seen eating, but is never seen eating meat, and is shown to enjoy veggie burgers. In The Itis, it is revealed that he does not eat pork. His dietary beliefs are shown to be influenced by Elijah Muhammad's How to Eat to Live, which recommends vegetarianism and forbids pork. However, in episodes like "Invasion of the Katrinians" and "Guess Hoe’s Coming to Dinner", Huey is shown eating lobster and fish sticks, which could possibly imply that he's a pescatarian.

Huey is shown to disagree with the popular beliefs of Christmas. Having espoused the belief that Christmas has roots in a Pagan holiday, he has suggested Jesus Christ probably hates people for celebrating it. He frequently displays agnostic-atheistic leanings. In the comic strip, he claims that Santa Claus is an Illuminati agent working toward The New World Order.

== Relationships ==
=== Riley Freeman ===
Riley is Huey's younger brother and his ideological opposite. Huey is politically minded and critical while Riley remains uninterested, showing great affection for things, such as rap, violence, and "bling," that Huey finds culturally poisonous. Despite their constant fighting and his disagreement with Riley's beliefs, Huey cares for his brother deeply and usually attempts to steer him in the right direction. Riley and Huey often get into furious battles that Huey always wins, as his disciplined use of martial arts beats Riley's unskilled street fighting style.

=== Robert Jebediah Freeman ===
Robert Freeman is the paternal grandfather and legal guardian of Huey and Riley Freeman, who often disagrees with many of Huey's political ideas. While in the comic strip, Huey and his grandfather have a much more affable relationship, in the series, they are almost constantly at odds, in part due to his frequent favoritism shown to Riley, who supports his grandfather's various crazy schemes. Huey seems to offer Granddad advice in certain situations, such as during "Granddad's Fight", "The S-Word", and "The Story of Thugnificent," attempts that almost always fall flat. Huey often tries to dissuade Robert from his get-rich-quick schemes and underhanded tendencies without much success. Robert has only ever had to use discipline towards Huey twice in the entire series: in the episode “The Garden Party”, Robert smacks Huey upside the head for “dreaming about telling White folks the truth”, and in the episode “Breaking Grandad”, upon finding out the “wave cream” Huey created was made with explosive chemicals needed for a bomb, Robert attempts to use his belt on Huey, who dodges, causing Riley to be mistakenly hit.

=== Jazmine DuBois ===
Although Jazmine DuBois and Huey see each other outside sometimes, Huey often treats Jazmine poorly due to his disdain for her naïve and trusting personality, and apolitical views. In the TV series, the two appear to be a lot closer (in fact, aside Riley she is the only other child he's shown to regularly speak with), as with Huey confiding in her about his desire to meet up with former best friend Cairo during a planned trip to Chicago ("Wingmen") and Huey allowing her to help him in his plan to free from prison an unjustly-convicted inmate scheduled to be executed ("The Passion of Reverend Ruckus"). Although Huey initially appears to be derisive of her beliefs, his opinion of her improves, and by the end of season 3, she is likely one of his few friends. In the nationwide epidemic during "The Fried Chicken Flu," she is present with Granddad and Riley among the only other people he allows to stay at his home. In the episode, "The Block Is Hot," Huey campaigns for her release from her quasi-child-labor contract and gives her his scarf at the end of the episode when she is cold. For her part, Jazmine appears to appreciate Huey's characteristics, claiming that he is "not like everyone else" ("Fried Chicken Flu"). She is also one of the few people who seem to actually listen to Huey, and was the only one that read the manual he provided during the fried chicken epidemic.

Throughout the comic strip and TV series, it is strongly hinted Jazmine may harbor feelings for Huey, which he may or may not reciprocate. The only evidence of Huey likely returning said feelings is seen in the unreleased pilot. While getting ready for school, Robert mentions that Jazmine will be at the bus stop, and Huey looks away, likely embarrassed. Riley and Robert lightly tease him for being “scurred” around her, which Huey vehemently denies. Robert encourages Huey to “lay down his game.” Later, Jazmine offers Huey a turkey sandwich after he and Riley are sent to detention for fighting. However, the moment is ruined when Riley chastises Huey for accepting the sandwich.

=== Tom DuBois ===
Tom DuBois, Jazmine's father, is a strait-laced liberal lawyer. Being a Democrat and an assistant district attorney, Tom is part of the structure that Huey views as inhibitive and self-destructive, leading to occasional conflict between the two. Huey also dislikes Tom because he encourages his daughter to conform to a more European look rather than emphasizing the beauty of her African features, as shown when Tom mentions that he's tried everything to make Jazmine's hair straighter. Despite Huey's ideological disagreements with Tom, the two are shown generally to be on good terms and get along well. Tom often acknowledges Huey's intellect and maturity to the extent that he will often turn to Huey for advice on subjects ranging from help with his marriage, politics, and his career as a prosecutor. When Tom is detained by police for false accusations of murder and finds out that he will be sent to real "butt-pounding" jail for the weekend, Tom uses his one phone call to beg Huey to catch the real killer before the end of the day.

=== Ed Wuncler, Sr. ===
Ed Wuncler serves as a villainous foil for Huey, as Ed Wuncler Sr. indeed represents everything Huey is against. In spite of this, Wuncler retains a friendly relationship with the Freeman family, despite Huey seeing through his friendly facade as far as the true evil person Wuncler is inside. Huey considers Wuncler's biases to stem from his greed, power and influence rather than actual racism. His name is a pun on Once-ler, a character from Dr. Seuss's book The Lorax, though Wuncler's family name is pronounced the same way, but only spelled differently.

=== Ed Wuncler III and Gin Rummy ===
Two of Huey's other enemies are Ed and Gin, having seen the two young men perform many criminal and immoral actions and does not hesitate to point out the obvious stupidity behind their careless conduct. He also does not care for the way that they help contribute to Riley's delinquent attitude, leading him to often warn his brother to stay away from them and to not ever see them.

=== Uncle Ruckus ===
Huey is the only recurring character to consistently show anger towards Uncle Ruckus, as others are usually confused by his beliefs and non-sequitur statements. Ruckus often views himself as a white man and often aspires to be white. This is due to the claim by his mother, stating that he was born with “re-vitiligo” (reverse vitiligo), and was adopted by herself and Ruckus' father, Mister Ruckus. In a later episode of the third season, we meet his mother, father, and two brothers; while his mother continues to strongly insist that he is adopted, his father says otherwise. Mister Ruckus tells Uncle that he is truly black, and that his mother loves white folks so much, she told Uncle he was adopted so that he could live being happy. In the third season's premiere, neither Huey nor Uncle Ruckus vote for Barack Obama to be elected president, but for different reasons: Ruckus's reason is that Obama is black and he wants McCain to win. Huey, on the other hand, aside from the fact he is not old enough to vote, does not like either one; though he voices little actual opinion during the episode, but it is apparent that he thinks that Obama being President isn't going to change anything as many people presume and is just another president. Huey and Ruckus both plan on leaving the country in a plan called "Operation Exodus." Huey claims that while he and Ruckus are by no means allies, the association is convenient - Ruckus has a car, and Huey has gas money. Their association is only meant to extend to the Canada–US border, at which point they will go their separate ways. The plan fails, however, when agents arrest Uncle Ruckus for threatening Obama. Huey, now unable to get a ride since Ruckus is in lockup, is forced to cancel Operation Exodus.

=== Michael Caesar ===
During the comic strip's run, Michael Caesar (known by his surname) was Huey's best friend and classmate. Like Huey, Caesar is very much self-aware of current events and experienced culture shock after leaving a big city like New York, and moving to the predominantly white suburb of Woodcrest. Caesar shares many of Huey's political views and goal of bettering the world but lacks his serious demeanor, preferring instead to engage in critical mockery rather than extreme activism. It is also suggested they're part of a group. Caesar does not appear in the animated TV series, due to the producers being unable to find the right voice actor for him; see instead Cairo, below.

=== Cairo ===
In the animated TV series, Caesar (see above) seems to be replaced by Cairo, a character who, instead of moving to Woodcrest, remained in Chicago's inner city after Huey left. Huey may have been unaware that Cairo had abandonment issues. Cairo developed a hatred and distrust of Huey after the latter "abandoned" the former by moving to a white suburb; when Huey later visited Cairo in Chicago ("Wingmen"), Cairo persistently accused Huey of various abandonment-related slights, gloating that he had replaced Huey with a new, superficially similar, friend. Although Huey tried to mend the rift, Cairo finally ended the friendship with a treacherous headbutt to Huey's face, deeply wounding Huey's feelings and thus causing him to cut Cairo from his life; leaving Cairo behind in the past for good.

== Reception ==
In the 2006 Glyph Comics Awards, Huey Freeman was named Best Male Character.
