= A Huey Freeman Christmas =

- The Boondocks episode
- Episode no.: Season 1 Episode 7
- Directed by: Seung Eun Kim
- Written by: Aaron McGruder
- Original air date: December 18, 2005

Guest appearances
- Quincy Jones as himself; Judge Reinhold as Mr. Uberwitz

Episode chronology
| ← Previous "The Story of Gangstalicious" | Next → "The Real" |
- The Boondocks (season 1)

"A Huey Freeman Christmas" is the seventh episode of the first season of the American animated television series The Boondocks. It originally aired on Adult Swim in the United States on December 18, 2005. In the episode, protagonist Huey Freeman seizes complete creative control of his elementary school's annual Christmas play, but runs into trouble with administration when he wishes to portray Jesus as black. Meanwhile, Riley Freeman rekindles an old grudge he has against Santa Claus.

"A Huey Freeman Christmas" was directed by Seung Eun Kim and the script was written by series creator Aaron McGruder.

== Plot ==
Huey's culturally sensitive teacher, Mr. Uberwitz, offers him a chance to direct the school's Christmas play in the hope of seeing an African-American perspective on the holiday. Huey is skeptical at first, thinking that Uberwitz will get fired for making this offer, but accepts on the condition that Uberwitz sign an agreement giving him full creative control. He begins writing a new play that adheres to his unique vision, sets up an office to manage the organizational work, and hires Quincy Jones as music director.

Finding that the students cast in the play are goofing off instead of rehearsing, Huey angrily fires all of them and consults with Jones about bringing in high-profile movie stars to fill the roles. He ignores protests from the Woodcrest PTA over the children's dismissal. When Huey refuses the school principal's demand that Jesus not be portrayed as black, the principal tears up Huey's agreement with Uberwitz. Demoralized and exhausted, Huey turns control over to Uberwitz, asking only to have his name removed from the production.

Uberwitz stages the play exactly as Huey wrote it, but only ten people show up for the performance. It is well-received by the local theater critics who attend, but almost no one else in Woodcrest is there to see it due to the PTA protests. Huey considers the play a success, but he regrets his decision to exclude his classmates and is disappointed that the public did not want to see his artistic vision. Also, Uberwitz loses his job as Huey had predicted, but eventually becomes a college professor specializing in African-American studies.

Meanwhile, Riley feuds with a shopping mall Santa, attacking him first with a folding chair and golf club and later with his airsoft guns. Riley is angry over not getting a set of car rims for Christmas in the past. Uncle Ruckus is hired by the mall to provide security for Santa, but proves inept at the job when Riley attacks again. Ruckus eventually becomes the new Santa, causing Jazmine to lose faith in the idea of Santa Claus until Ruckus claims that the real Santa had secretly chosen him to fill in after seeing how dangerous the mall could be. Jazmine accepts this story and attends Huey's play with Riley and Granddad, applauding enthusiastically as they sleep through it. Riley then confronts Ruckus after learning of what he said to Jazmine, and tells him to pass along the warning that he will be waiting for Santa next year.

== Reception ==
Reception for the episode has been generally positive. Curt Fields of The Washington Post deemed the episode "excellent", writing, "With a knowing spin on A Charlie Brown Christmas, the story is a laugh-out-loud take on the holiday, consumerism and earnestly liberal white folks."
