= The Boondocks season 1 =

The Boondocks
- Season 1
- DVD cover
- No. of episodes: 15

Release
- Original network: Adult Swim
- Original release: November 6, 2005 – March 19, 2006

Season chronology
- Next → Season 2

The first season of the animated television series The Boondocks originally aired in the United States on Cartoon Network's late-night programming block Adult Swim. Season one started on November 6, 2005, with "The Garden Party" and ended with "The Passion of Reverend Ruckus" on March 19, 2006, with a total of fifteen episodes.

All fifteen episodes from season one were released completely uncensored on a three-disc DVD set in the United States on July 25, 2006. The first season is also available on the iTunes Store and has been made available for on demand streaming on HBO Max (originally shown on Netflix and then Hulu).

== Production ==
Anthony Bell, Joe Horne, Seung Eun Kim, and Kalvin Lee served as directors, and series creator Aaron McGruder, Rodney Barnes, and Yamara Taylor served as writers for season one. All episodes in season one originally aired in the United States on Cartoon Network's late night programming block, Adult Swim, and are rated TV-MA for graphic violence and dangerous activity involving children, explicit language (mostly heavy use of racist, sexist, and homophobic slurs, as well as bleeped-out profanity), and infrequent instances of strong sexual content and nudity, with the exception of "The Itis", which was rated TV-14 for drug references and moderate violence.

Season one features guest appearances from Charlie Murphy, Ed Asner, Adam West, Katt Williams, Terry Crews, Samuel L. Jackson, Mos Def, Sway Calloway, Quincy Jones, Judge Reinhold, Xzibit, John C. McGinley, Kevin Michael Richardson, Candi Milo, Rob Paulsen, and Mike Epps.

== Episodes ==
No. overall	No. in season	Title	Directed by	Written by	Original release date	Prod. code
1	1	"The Garden Party"	Anthony Bell	Aaron McGruder (story); Rodney Barnes (screenplay)	November 6, 2005	103
The Freemans are adjusting to life in Woodcrest. Robert is invited to a ritzy garden party by tycoon Ed Wuncler, but is concerned that his grandsons will embarrass him in front of his new neighbors. At the party, Huey tries to enlighten the partygoers with the "truth" and Ed III dares Riley to shoot him with a shotgun. Ed Asner and Charlie Murphy guest star as Ed Wuncler and Ed Wuncler III respectively.
2	2	"The Trial of R. Kelly"	Anthony Bell	Aaron McGruder (story); Rodney Barnes (screenplay)	November 13, 2005	101
R. Kelly is brought to trial for urinating on an underage girl. Riley supports Kelly, but Huey sides with the law, thereby separating himself from many members of his own ethnicity who defend Kelly despite the overwhelming evidence against him. Adam West guest stars as R Kelly's lawyer.
3	3	"Guess Hoe's Coming to Dinner"	Anthony Bell	Aaron McGruder (story); Rodney Barnes (screenplay)	November 20, 2005	102
Robert falls in love with a young woman, Cristal, oblivious to the fact that she is a prostitute. She moves in with the family, to his grandsons' chagrin, but Robert refuses to see the truth until her pimp shows up looking for her. Music: "Gold Digger" by Kanye West Feat. Jamie Foxx, "She's No Good" by Asheru, "Freddie's Dead" by Curtis Mayfield; Katt Williams guest stars as A Pimp Named Slickback.
4	4	"Granddad's Fight"	Joe Horne	Aaron McGruder (story); Rodney Barnes (screenplay)	November 27, 2005	104
Robert is humiliated when he loses a fight to Stinkmeaner, a crotchety old blind man. Egged on by Riley and the ridiculous amount of media coverage the event receives, he challenges the man to a rematch. Huey, believing the old man to be a highly-skilled blind warrior, puts Robert through intense preparatory training, guided by Uncle Ruckus, but ultimately realizes that Stinkmeaner won the first fight through sheer luck. Granddad ends up accidentally killing Stinkmeaner in anger during the rematch. Music: "Eye of the Tiger" by Survivor, "Guillotine (Swordz)" by Raekwon Feat. Ghostface Killah, Inspectah Deck and GZA / Genius
5	5	"A Date with the Health Inspector"	Joe Horne	Aaron McGruder (story); Rodney Barnes (screenplay)	December 4, 2005	106
When Tom DuBois is arrested on suspicion of murder, Huey and Riley enlist the help of Ed Wuncler III and his friend Gin Rummy to find the real killer so Tom can avoid his worst fear of being raped in prison. Music: "Die Without Vengeance" by The McReal Brothers; Charlie Murphy, Terry Crews and Samuel L. Jackson guest star as Ed Wuncler III, The Health Inspector, and Gin Rummy respectively.
6	6	"The Story of Gangstalicious"	Seung Eun Kim	Aaron McGruder (story); Rodney Barnes (screenplay)	December 11, 2005	107
Riley's favorite gangsta rapper, Gangstalicious, is hospitalized in Woodcrest after being shot. While visiting him, Riley learns the truth about his idol and the meaning of "Thuggin' Luv". Mos Def and MTV News anchor Sway guest star as Gangstalicious and himself respectively.
7	7	"A Huey Freeman Christmas"	Seung Eun Kim	Aaron McGruder	December 18, 2005	109
Huey is given creative control over his school's Christmas play. Meanwhile, Riley revives an old grudge with Santa. Quincy Jones and Judge Reinhold guest star as himself and Mr. Uberwitz respectively.
8	8	"The Real"	Anthony Bell	Aaron McGruder	January 8, 2006	105
Following Riley's advice, Robert pretends to be blind to get his ride pimped, but then Extreme Makeover: Home Edition shows up to add a new wing onto the house. Meanwhile, is Huey being stalked by a mysterious secret agent, or is his paranoia playing tricks on his mind? Xzibit and John C. McGinley guest star as himself and The White Shadow respectively.
9	9	"Return of the King"	Kalvin Lee	Aaron McGruder	January 15, 2006	110
Martin Luther King Jr. wakes up from a coma after 32 years and is thrust into a far different world than the one he remembers: he's ostracized and castigated by the post-9/11 world for applying his philosophy of peace to terrorism. Huey motivates Dr. King to revive the civil rights movement by creating a black revolution party. Music: "Wishing" by Ed O.G. featuring Masta Ace; Kevin Michael Richardson guest stars as MLK.
10	10	"The Itis"	Joe Horne	Aaron McGruder (story); Rodney Barnes (screenplay)	January 22, 2006	108
With financial help from Ed Wuncler, Robert opens Woodcrest's first soul food restaurant. The business is extremely popular at first, but soon begins to have a corrosive effect on the neighborhood. Music: "Straight Outta the Oven, Made with Nothin' But Lovin" by Asheru; Ed Asner and Candi Milo guest star as Ed Wuncler and Janet O'Siren.
11	11	"Let's Nab Oprah"	Seung Eun Kim	Aaron McGruder (story); Yamara Taylor (screenplay)	February 12, 2006	112
When Riley, Ed Wuncler III, and Gin Rummy try to kidnap Oprah Winfrey, Riley turns out to be the real brains of the operation. When Huey hears of the plan, he tries to stop it and set Riley straight. Music: "Raid", "All Caps", and "Strange Ways" by Madvillain. Charlie Murphy and Samuel L. Jackson guest star as Ed Wuncler III and Gin Rummy.
12	12	"Riley Wuz Here"	Kalvin Lee	Aaron McGruder	February 19, 2006	113
Robert forces Riley to take art lessons after he is caught painting graffiti on houses. Riley's teacher, styled after Bob Ross from PBS, encourages him to plan his work carefully and even helps him with his projects. Meanwhile, Huey conducts an experiment similar to the documentary Super Size Me, watching only black-oriented television for two weeks straight to see if it negatively affects his health. Music: "Today" by Tom Scott; Rob Paulsen guest stars as Riley's art teacher.
13	13	"Wingmen"	Seung Eun Kim	Aaron McGruder	March 5, 2006	111
Robert is asked to give a eulogy in Chicago for his deceased World War II friend Moe, which is an opportunity for Huey Freeman to reconnect with his old friend Cairo. Unfortunately, things go wrong for both of them. Music: "Fancy Clown" by Madvillain; Mike Epps guest stars as Moe Jackson.
14	14	"The Block Is Hot"	Kalvin Lee	Aaron McGruder	March 12, 2006	114
An abnormally hot winter day causes Woodcrest's citizens to act strangely; meanwhile, Jazmine opens a lemonade stand and, against Huey's advice, sells out to Ed Wuncler for the price of a pony, but she learns the true value of a hard day's work. Music: "Fight the Power" by Public Enemy; Ed Asner guest stars as Ed Wuncler.
15	15	"The Passion of Reverend Ruckus"	Sean Song	Aaron McGruder (story); Rodney Barnes (screenplay)	March 19, 2006	115
Uncle Ruckus dreams about a "white heaven" and is diagnosed with cancer. He dedicates the remainder of his life to preaching to the world about loving the "white man". Meanwhile, Huey devises a comprehensive scheme to bust an unjustly imprisoned death row inmate out of jail. Music: "Say I Believe In It" by Isabelle Antena.

== Home media ==
All fifteen episodes from season one were released uncensored on a three-disc DVD set in the United States on July 25, 2006.

The Boondocks season one
Set details	Special features
15 episodes; 3-disc set; 16:9 aspect ratio; Languages: English; English subtitles; Spanish subtitles; French subtitles	Audio and video commentaries by creator Aaron McGruder; Audio commentaries by Uncle Ruckus; Behind-the-scenes; Deleted scenes; Animatics; Unaired "Adult Swim" TV promos; Printable storyboards
Release dates	Audio and video commentaries by creator Aaron McGruder; Audio commentaries by Uncle Ruckus; Behind-the-scenes; Deleted scenes; Animatics; Unaired "Adult Swim" TV promos; Printable storyboards
Region 1	Audio and video commentaries by creator Aaron McGruder; Audio commentaries by Uncle Ruckus; Behind-the-scenes; Deleted scenes; Animatics; Unaired "Adult Swim" TV promos; Printable storyboards
July 25, 2006	Audio and video commentaries by creator Aaron McGruder; Audio commentaries by Uncle Ruckus; Behind-the-scenes; Deleted scenes; Animatics; Unaired "Adult Swim" TV promos; Printable storyboards
