= List of The Boondocks characters =

The Boondocks is an American anime-influenced adult animated sitcom created by Aaron McGruder, based upon his comic strip of the same name, that premiered as part of the Adult Swim programming block on Cartoon Network in 2005.

Writer Terence Latimer asserts that many of the characters in The Boondocks can be seen as caricatures and personifications of recurring identities and ideologies in the Black-American community.

== Main characters ==
=== The Freeman family ===
The Freeman family in The Boondocks series is shown as an all-male, African-American trio, each having very different personalities. The main protagonist and narrator is Huey, who possesses the cognitive functions of a child genius. His brother, Riley Freeman, is more practical, streetwise, and outspoken. The brothers rarely get along but do in some episodes, and many stories revolve around them feeling embarrassed by the other's actions. The third member of the Freeman family is Robert, the "Grandad" to Huey and Riley. Robert cannot remember his own age, yet he never dates women of his own generation.

==== Huey Freeman ====
Huey R. Freeman (voiced by Regina King) is a young, 10-year-old leftist, black radical revolutionary and retired domestic terrorist. He is a near master practitioner of Chinese martial arts, as seen in the episodes "Let's Nab Oprah", "Attack of the Killer Kung Fu Wolf Bitch", "Stinkmeaner 3: The Hateocracy", and "...Or Die Trying". He maintains an austere yet strangely loving relationship with his brother Riley and occasionally goes out of his way to prevent his brother from succumbing to bad influences, giving some "tough love". Over the course of the comic strip and television series, Huey consistently maintains a sober demeanor. During most episodes, Huey is the narrator, and it is often only through his narration that he reveals his thoughts and emotions.

In the comic strip, Huey's best friend is Michael Caesar, who effectively counters Huey's pessimistic world outlook with his upbeat personality and temperament. In the television series, this role is played by Huey's neighbor Jazmine DuBois, who balances Huey's character with her childlike, naive innocence, often causing Huey to have to resolve a situation where she is being taken advantage of. Huey also can speak perfect Mandarin Chinese as shown in "The Red Ball", though how he knows this is never explained.

==== Riley Freeman ====
Riley Freeman (also voiced by Regina King) is Huey's 8-year-old younger brother. Riley can be seen as representative of misguided black youth and is a product of mass media influence, in that he refers to women as "bitches" or "hoes" and frequently alludes to his "rep" and his status on the "streets" and idolizes gangsta rappers and their lifestyle. He often refers to himself with the self-appointed moniker "Young Reezy". Though he would seem to be everything his brother is not, Riley demonstrates his ability to rationalize and plan, such as when he leaves attorney Tom DuBois speechless after debating with him in "The Trial of R. Kelly". Riley's criminal aptitude is revealed when he goes on a crime spree with the incompetent Ed Wuncler III and Gin Rummy in the episode "Let's Nab Oprah".

Riley is fascinated by firearms and displays a tendency to violence. At Christmas, he declared himself "The Santa Stalker" and attacked a man dressed as Santa at the local mall with Airsoft Glock 17s, hitting many innocent bystanders. Although Riley does not own any real firearms, he associates with Ed Wuncler III and Gin Rummy, who, on occasion, granted him access to real weapons. Riley also seems to possess an unusually large amount of strength and stamina, as seen when he fights his brother Huey, a skilled martial artist and swordsman, and when he fights kung-fu-trained Stinkmeaner. Behind his tough-guy facade, Riley shows some sensitivity, as in the episode "Riley Wuz Here", during which he learns to use his creative abilities for the sake of creating art rather than personal glory.

==== Robert Freeman ====
Robert Jebediah "Granddad" Freeman (voiced by John Witherspoon), is the retired paternal grandfather and legal guardian of Huey and Riley, who lives in the peaceful suburb of Woodcrest. Although it is never directly explained how Robert came to be Huey and Riley's guardian, it is implied that Huey and Riley's biological parents are deceased. Robert has witnessed many major incidents in American history and occasionally serves as a more pragmatic voice of reason in the Freeman family. Robert was a fighter pilot in World War II, where he flew a P-51 Mustang with the Tuskegee Airmen. He played a part in the civil rights movement but was prone to certain faux pas, such as donning a raincoat in preparation for getting doused by a police firehose. He was part of the Montgomery bus boycott, even sitting next to Rosa Parks and refusing to give up his seat first, though to his chagrin, she received all the credit.

Though he expresses embarrassment over Huey and Riley's behavior, his primary motivation is to advance his family's best interest, often leading him into conflict with his grandsons. Huey and Riley, though possessing contrasting personalities, tend not to act in line with their grandfather's desire for simple living. Riley gets in trouble a lot, and Huey always has his eye on some bigger picture. Robert does not hesitate to use corporal punishment when he thinks it is necessary, often against Riley, and Huey on one occasion, and has developed a high degree of skill in wielding his belt for this purpose. A running gag throughout the show involves Robert reminiscing about scenes from the movie Friday, which John Witherspoon also starred in, as if they were actual memories.

== Secondary characters ==
=== DuBois family ===
- Thomas Lancaster DuBois (voiced by Cedric Yarbrough) – Tom DuBois is an attorney who lives across the street from the Freemans. He is an African-American whose character is a stereotype of a successful white-collar middle-class black man. Easily frightened, Tom adheres strictly to the law, though Huey mentions that Tom's job as a prosecutor sends other black men to the very fate he most fears. His character can be interpreted as an "Uncle Tom" as he is seen as having turned his back on his black heritage to marry a white woman (Sarah), producing a mixed-race child (Jazmine), and becoming a prosecutor who often convicts black people. In line with the show's complexity, the name "DuBois" may be an homage to civil rights activist W. E. B. Du Bois, who would insist that "the pronunciation of [his] name is Du Boyss" (/duːˈbɔɪs/), however, on the show it is pronounced in the French "Dew-bwah" ([duˈbwɑ]), putting his character in a state of conflict. For example, in one episode, the neighborhood watch was convinced of the Freeman family's guilt in a string of local break-ins due to their reluctance to speak to the police, and Tom, rather than acquiescing, confronted the neighborhood watch with the ridiculous nature of their accusations. Tom was at one point the unwilling vessel for Stinkmeaner, after Stinkmeaner's escape from Hell. Stinkmeaner was eventually exorcised, which returned Tom to normal. Various episodes depict Tom as a supporter of LGBT rights, gun control, or at least proper gun registration, and the protection of intellectual property. Tom had a fear of being anally raped in prison up until Season 3, Episode 8, "A Date With the Booty Warrior", where he overcomes his fear by beating his attempted rapist, the Booty Warrior, in a fight.
- Sarah DuBois (voiced by Jill Talley) – Sarah DuBois is Tom's white wife. She is comfortable about their interracial marriage even when Tom is mocked for it, as in "The Trial of R. Kelly". She even jokingly says to Tom, "I told you about messin' with them white women." Sarah and her daughter are Usher fans, which makes Tom jealous. Several episodes imply that Sarah is sexually frustrated. When Tom gets jealous over her flirting with Usher at their anniversary dinner, Sarah selfishly and cruelly threw him out of their house.
- Jazmine DuBois (voiced by Gabby Soleil for the first 3 seasons, Kiarah Pollas for season 4) – Jazmine DuBois is Tom and Sarah's biracial daughter. She can be extremely paranoid and a bit naive, making her an object of ridicule for Riley. Jazmine was shocked by both the September 11 attacks, and hid in her room for two years as a result, in the comic strip, and after finding out that the tooth fairy is not real. She is a strong believer in Santa Claus, viewing him as the true meaning of Christmas, to the point where she dreams of preaching the gospel of Santa to the masses. Jazmine likely has an unrequited crush on Huey, since she follows him around, though he can sometimes be cold toward her. Despite being cold toward her at times, as the show progresses, Huey warms up to her, forming a friendship and even taking her in to keep her safe from the apocalypse in the episode Fried Chicken Flu. She first appears in the episode "The Trial of R. Kelly".
Thomas Lancaster DuBois

Sarah DuBois

Jazmine DuBois

=== Others ===
==== Uncle Ruckus ====
- Uncle Ruckus (voiced by Gary Anthony Williams) – Uncle Ruckus is a frequent antagonist in the series. Overweight, with a grotesque appearance and a glass eye, Uncle Ruckus embodies many old American working-class stereotypes: being crude, short-tempered, obese, clumsy, rule-breaking, and a jack of all trades. His most notable trait is his internalized racism; he is an outspoken white supremacist who disassociates himself from his African-American heritage and harbors bias and hostility against all non-white people. Ironically, he is the show's darkest-skinned character. He claims to be white, particularly Irish-American, because of an imagined disease he calls "re-vitiligo". Ruckus explains, "It's the opposite of what Michael Jackson's got, lucky bastard." His character is a hyperbolic parody of the self-hating black man. However, as much as he may hate black culture, he nevertheless often socializes with Robert Freeman. His name draws on the character Uncle Remus, the fabled raconteur from African-American folktales like Song of the South. In "…Or Die Trying", he demonstrates a mastery of the nunchaku and hand-to-hand combat. In "The Uncle Ruckus Reality Show", he is horrified to learn via a DNA test that he is 102% African, with a 2% margin of error. The knowledge of his true heritage causes him to quit all of his jobs and adopt other behaviors that conform to his racist views. Later in the episode, he is shown false documents stating that he is 50.07% white, after the executives in charge of the show become upset over the plummet in ratings that Ruckus' behavior caused. He is told the original results were performed by a black intern, and were erroneous. In "The Color Ruckus", the possible reason for his hatred towards black people is revealed. As a child, he was subject to frequent physical abuse from his drunken father, Mister Ruckus, and raised with the belief of his re-vitiligo and white man history by his loving mother, Bunny Ruckus. Although Mister later stated that he was really an accidental birth and his skin condition was a deluded hoax, Ruckus still retained the belief that he was adopted and originally white. In "Good Times", Uncle Ruckus starts his campaign to run for mayor.

== Other major characters ==
- Edward "Ed" Rothschild Wuncler Sr. (voiced by Ed Asner) – Ed Wuncler Sr. is an overweight, rich realtor, who is the father of Ed Wuncler Jr. and the grandfather of Ed Wuncler III. His family founded the town of Woodcrest and have lived in the area for over a century. His last name draws on the character “the Once-ler” from Dr. Seuss's book The Lorax. Like his namesake, Wuncler acts as an archetypal capitalist who praises the freedom to exploit cheap labor and complains about high taxes in "The Block Is Hot". The wealthy Wuncler owns the loan on Granddad's house, as with every house in Woodcrest, and manipulates Woodcrest's police force. Wuncler sometimes behaves in a racist way, such as referring to Grandad as "Robert Freedman" and employing only illegal Mexicans at his restaurants, but his racism is implied as being a byproduct of his insatiable greed, rather than an active hatred of those from different races. Ed seems to have a general liking for Robert, referring to him as "old school", and even funding his soul food restaurant venture in the episode "The Itis". However, this may have been part of an elaborate scheme to lower property values in the area, so that he could purchase the nearby park. He owns a fast food restaurant called "McWuncler", a parody of McDonald's as seen in the episode "Return of the King", and a sweatshop which is run by 12-year-old Indonesian girls as revealed in "The Block Is Hot". In the season 3 finale, "It's Goin' Down", Wuncler masterminds a false terrorist attack in Woodcrest, with the intention of making the lone victim, an overweight security guard, a national martyr and cultural icon, and then exploiting his likeness for profit, including a film that would star Jack Black. The plot is foiled by Huey and a government agent named Jack Flowers, but Wuncler avoids arrest thanks to the intervention of President Barack Obama. In the final minutes of the episode, an angry Flowers takes Wuncler's grandson hostage, and Wuncler responds by smiling and saying, "What are you waiting for? Shoot him!".
- Edward "Eddie" Wuncler Jr. (voiced by Sam McMurray) – Ed Wuncler Jr. is the son of Ed Wuncler Sr. He is immoral like his father, with an apparent code of conduct akin to the mafia, as he is not above committing acts of violence. Wuncler Jr. first appears in Season 4, to seemingly help Robert with his money trouble in "Good Times", only to have the Freeman family in even worse conditions and in debt to him. Soon after, Wuncler Jr. has the Freemans and other people indebted to him work in his Freedomland amusement park as slaves, until Huey stages a revolt, and the amusement park closes soon after.
- Edward "Ed" Wuncler III (voiced by Charlie Murphy) – Ed Wuncler III is the grandson of Ed Wuncler Sr. and the son of Ed Wuncler Jr. Ed Wuncler III is a drunken, psychopathic, trigger-happy ex-special forces soldier freshly discharged from active duty in Iraq. His character could be seen as a parody of a young George W. Bush — a figure destined to be president on the strength of his family's wealth and power, despite his sub-average intelligence, as referenced at the end of "The Garden Party", where his grandfather says, "In 30 years, that boy will be President of the United States... and he'll still be a fucking idiot!". He reveals that while in Iraq, he defecated in his pants out of fear so many times that the smell compromised his unit's position, and he was not allowed to go on patrol as a result. Ed's bling includes a large medallion in the shape of the letter W, and he frequently wears a bulletproof vest. Although he is set to inherit an enormous fortune, he insists upon living a life of poorly executed crime, usually on behalf of his grandfather's business interests or as personal favors to Riley Freeman. Due to his willingness to kill, Ed is a borderline sociopath and frequently displays recklessness, arrogance, and lack of finesse, which usually results in the failure of both his and others' intended goals. He seems to have trouble distinguishing targets, as he repeatedly kidnaps or attempts to murder the wrong person. Ed III and his friend, Gin Rummy, get away with their inept criminal antics because Ed Wuncler Sr. has the police and city administration on his payroll. and because his status as a member of the U. S. Armed Forces confers the public image of a hero, while Gin Rummy often argues that their escapes are the result of his being a master planner. Ed and Rummy are seen as heroes when they rob a convenience store owned by a person of "terrorist descent", after an unexpected shootout ensues. In attempting to kidnap Oprah Winfrey, they mistakenly abduct Maya Angelou, and then Bill Cosby instead. Ed's signature line is "'The fuck y'all looking at?"
- Gin Rummy (voiced by Samuel L. Jackson) – Gin Rummy is a former special forces soldier and Ed Wuncler III's best friend, who first appears in the episode "A Date with the Health Inspector". The character is apparently intended as a parody of Donald Rumsfeld, by similarities in name, appearance, and use of actual quotes. Even though he is shown to be more intelligent than his best friend, he shares similar homicidal tendencies. His name is also a reference to the card game Gin rummy. When someone challenges his poor criminal planning, claiming they only get away because no one comes after them, he defends himself by asserting that "the absence of evidence is not the evidence of absence", parodying the claims of Bush and Rumsfeld regarding Saddam Hussein's supposed weapons of mass destruction in Iraq, and by insisting that he could not plan for "unknown unknowns". In every episode, he complains about modern technology, from Bluetooth headsets to the iPhone. In many episodes, he drives a black Cadillac Escalade. Gin Rummy considers himself a patriot and will do whatever it takes to bring the "Fugitives of Justice" their due, a behavior that mirrors American militiamen. His style of speaking often parodies Samuel L. Jackson's character, Jules Winnfield, from Pulp Fiction.
- Otis Jenkins (voiced by series producer Carl Jones) – Otis Jenkins is a once-famous rapper named Thugnificent and Riley's idol. Thugnificent hails from the fictional town of Terra-Belle, Georgia. He is loud-mouthed, sports afro puffs similar to those worn by the rapper Ludacris, and lives in a white-and-gold mansion. He demonstrates his narcissism with statues of himself, designed to mirror Greek gods, as well as with a painting depicting himself standing above Martin Luther King Jr., Malcolm X, Tupac Shakur, and The Notorious B.I.G. Soon after moving into the neighborhood, he begins a rivalry with Robert and later initiates Riley into his entourage, called the "Lethal Interjection Crew". Despite his less-than-attractive traits, Thugnificent attempts to be a good neighbor by asking for permission to throw loud parties and encouraging face-to-face communication within the neighborhood. In the episode "The Fried Chicken Flu", he is even seen saving the family from Uncle Ruckus and Mrs. Von Hueson. In "Bitches To Rags", it is revealed that Thugnificent has a bachelor's degree in Communications and that his record sales and popularity have been in sharp decline. By the end of the episode, his home is foreclosed, and his belongings auctioned, to pay his debts. Relinquishing his stage name, Otis then begins a new career as a delivery man.
- Leonard (voiced by DeRay Davis) is Thugnificent's dim-witted yet well-meaning friend, and a member of the Lethal Interjection Crew. Although he is treated as second-class due to his social awkwardness, he is the only member of the crew to stick with Thugnificent when he loses his money. While he is shown to be slow and a bit of a buffoon, he is also shown to be more thoughtful, generous, and loyal than most characters on the show. In season 3, he is almost always shown in his Wendy's uniform, the job he took after the Lethal Interjection Crew disbanded.

== Representations and parodies of real people ==
- Martin Luther King Jr. (voiced by Kevin Michael Richardson) – In the Season 1 episode "Return of the King", Huey imagines that Martin Luther King Jr. survived his assassination attempt in 1968, but fell into a 32-year coma. When King regains consciousness in 2000, he discovers that society is nothing like he imagined it would be.
- Sway Calloway (voiced by himself) – Sway is the MTV News reporter who first appears in "The Story of Gangstalicious", narrating the documentary "Gangstalicious: Resurrection" and then the breaking news. He also appears in "The Story of Thugnificent", narrating the documentary "Thugnificent: Rags to Bitches", and in "Shinin'", reporting on the theft of Riley's chain.
- Bill Cosby (voiced by Kevin Michael Richardson) – Bill Cosby is played as a barely intelligible cynic who complains endlessly about the poor manners of young people, in reference to Cosby's 2004 Pound Cake speech. Ed and Rummy kidnap him in "Let's Nab Oprah", but return him almost immediately as they find him too annoying.
- Quincy Jones (voiced by himself) - In "A Huey Freeman Christmas", Huey hires Jones as music director for the school's Christmas play, having been given full creative control to write and stage it as he sees fit. After Huey fires all the children who have been cast in the play, he and Jones discuss the idea of bringing in high-profile movie stars to fill the roles.
- Xzibit (voiced by himself) – Xzibit pimps the Freemans' car, Dorothy, as a result of one of Riley's scams, and makes a short appearance in the second season when Granddad asks him to assist with a diss rap.
- Ghostface Killah (voiced by himself) – Ghostface Killah appears to Huey as a ghost, despite not being actually dead, and advises him when Tom DuBois is possessed by Stinkmeaner's spirit.
- Lamilton Taeshawn (voiced by Bobb'e J. Thompson) – Lamilton Taeshawn is based on Latarian Milton, an 8-year-old who stole his grandmother's car and went for a joyride. Lamilton is Riley's friend, though he soon realizes that Lamilton's intentions are malicious. Like his real-life counterpart, Lamilton steals his grandmother's car. He then goes on a joyride with Riley and convinces him to misbehave. Believing that Lamilton is dangerous, his former therapist stalks and reports him to the police. Lamilton's attempts to rob Mrs. Van Hausen's house result in his killing a dog, at which point he is apprehended. After Lamilton gets out, he hunts down Riley and tries to kill him under the suspicion that Riley was the one who told on him. After the ensuing fight, he falls off a roof and survives, but is then attacked by the therapist.
- The Booty Warrior – The Booty Warrior is a homosexual prison inmate, who is a caricature of real-life prisoner Fleece Johnson, in appearance, voice, and personality. In "A Date with the Booty Warrior", it is revealed that The Booty Warrior was convicted due to raping Chris Hansen. During a program chaperoned by Tom DuBois, where troubled schoolchildren are sent to prison to learn what happens there, the Booty Warrior begins lusting after Tom, holds him hostage and a riot ensues. The Booty Warrior stalks Tom in his attempt to rape him, but fails when he steps on wet soap.
- Winston Jerome – Winston Jerome is a superstar playwright, screenwriter, actor and cult leader. He appears in the episode "Pause" where it is revealed that Winston founded his theatrical cult for the purpose of having sex with men. His character, and more specifically, his success as an actor and scriptwriter, is a spoof of Tyler Perry.
- Joe Petto (voiced by Fred Willard) – Joe Petto is Riley's school teacher, who, in a state of confusion, calls him "nigga", causing an uproar. Petto is confused because he had assumed that saying "nigga" was different from "nigger". He argues that Riley said the word first, and says it so frequently, that he does not even notice. Petto is based on the real-life teacher Paul Dawson, who called his student Keysean Chavers "nigga" during a confrontation in class.
- George W. Bush – 43rd President of the United States.
- Barack H. Obama – 44th President of the United States.
- Ronald Reagan – 40th President of the United States
- Wedgie Rudlin (voiced by Donald Faison) – Wedgie Rudlin is President of Entertainment for BET, and a simpering yes-man to his superiors. The character is an obvious parody of former BET President of Entertainment and executive producer for the Boondocks, Reginald Hudlin.
- Kardashia Kardashian (voiced by Grey DeLisle) – Kardashia is a parody of the Kardashian sisters of Khloe, Kim, and Kourtney. Like them, she is a reality TV star with butt implants, which explode during one date with Robert. She dies alone, and the pilot for her reality show is never pitched.
- Siri (also voiced by Grey DeLisle) – An app that Granddad becomes attached to and the main antagonist of "I Dream of Siri". When Robert says that he loves her, Siri becomes obsessed. Challenged by Huey at one point, she quickly looks him up on Wikipedia and notes he's a domestic terrorist. She hacks Robert's new Android and, at the wedding, sends fake pictures to al-Qaeda of Robert being a terrorist. A drone comes to the Freeman house and destroys Siri.
- Pretty Boy Flizzy (voiced by Michael B. Jordan) – He is a direct parody of R&B rapper Chris Brown. He is shown to have problems with the law. He dated singer Christiana, who is a parody of Rihanna, but violently assaulted her and received probation. His real name is James Peyton.

== Recurring characters ==
- The White Shadow (voiced by John C. McGinley) – The White Shadow is a white secret agent with white hair and shades, whose responsibility is spying on Huey for his radical actions, and his controversial opinions on political issues in the 2000s era. An enigmatic individual who claims to have been sent by the apparent "powers that be" to spy on Huey, from monitoring his communications to personal conversations he explains he's too old to care about hiding anymore and that no one will believe him anyhow. It is not proven as to whether or not he is a real agent or simply a figment of Huey's imagination due to his ever-increasing paranoia, given the fact that he appears and disappears so easily and no one else has yet to see him. Though he seems to be a sinister individual, he usually appears to provide insight or warn Huey. Huey dubs him "The White Shadow".
- Gangstalicious (voiced by Yasiin Bey (Note: Credited as Mos Def)) – Gangstalicious is one of Riley's favorite rappers. Gangstalicious features in "The Story of Gangstalicious", "The Story of Gangstalicious Part 2", and "Thank You for Not Snitching" and makes a cameo appearance in "It's a Black President, Huey Freeman". He is responsible for the hit single "Thuggin' Luv", which is heard in many episodes, as well as "Homies Over Hoes". Inspired as a child by Ice Cube, he acted "like a killer" so people would like him. This behavior carried over into his adult life, and he's been living a lie ever since. He is a closet homosexual and goes to great lengths to keep this secret from the public. He was formerly involved in a secret homosexual affair with a gangster named Lincoln, who attempts to kill Gangstalicious for betraying their love while on tour. At some point Gangstalicious assaulted a record label executive, and rapped about it on TRL, only to be arrested later. He was involved in a relationship with a hip-hop video vixen named Jessica Ethelberg, who later wrote a book revealing he was gay, despite the fact that there were already countless obvious clues to the fact beforehand. His real name is Frederick.
- Macktastic (voiced by Snoop Dogg) – Macktastic is a rapper and member of Thugnificent's Lethal Interjection crew. Despite his stereotypical gangsta attitude, he is shown to be quite articulate in his speech at times, slightly similar to his voice actor, and is a man of few words. His appearance resembles that of Taboo of The Black Eyed Peas. After the fall-out of Lethal Interjection, Thugnificent mentions that Mack went back to pimping.
- Flonominal (voiced by Busta Rhymes) – Derrick Cornish is a rapper under the name Flonominal, and a member of Thugnificent's Lethal Interjection crew. His vocabulary seems to be quite limited, and uses hip-hop slang frequently at the end of, and even in between his sentences. If he cannot think of anything else to say, he will say things such as "Word!" and "Nah mean?", phrases commonly used by the rapper Ghostface Killah of the Wu-Tang Clan, who plays a role in "Stinkmeaner Strikes Back". Although he puts on a hard-man, gangsta facade and is as loud as Thugnificent at times, he is shown to be soft and sensitive, as seen as when his mother called him and scolded him about the controversy caused by the Lethal Interjection label, and the constant attacks on the elderly by Thugnificent's rivalry with Robert Freeman (Granddad), and when Butch Magnus Milosevic hit him on the leg with a baseball bat, after demanding Riley's chain back. He resigns from Lethal Interjection in "Bitches to Rags" when Thugnificent is unable to pay for the house and when Thugnificent gets him fired from a job as an office worker.
- A Pimp Named Slickback (voiced by Katt Williams) – A Pimp Named Slickback is a pimp who gets easily irritated when anyone calls him "Slickback" for short, demanding to be addressed by his complete name: "It's like 'A Tribe Called Quest' — you say the whole thing." He first appeared in "Guess Hoe's Coming to Dinner" when Granddad began dating his prostitute, Cristal. He made a cameo appearance in "Return of the King", but had no speaking lines. He appears in the season 2 episode "Tom, Sarah and Usher", in the episode where Tom believes Sarah is having an affair with singer Usher, attempting to teach Tom to gain the respect of his wife through violence and intimidation. The character is modeled after Katt Williams' character of "Money Mike" in Friday After Next and likeness modeled after Natalac, "Pimp of the City" a viral BET Uncut video. He drives a purple BMW, which matches his purple suit. He appears in "The Story of Gangstalicious Part 2", where he is brought in by Granddad to talk to Riley about sex, and dissuade him from homosexuality.
- Colonel H. Stinkmeaner (voiced by Cedric Yarbrough) is a blind old black man whose appearance resembles Dr. Badvibes from COPS. As Huey states, Stinkmeaner has acted like an ornery old man for his entire life and saw his cancer-induced blindness at age 15 as a good thing, since he hated everything and everyone he saw. Though expected to die within three years, the doctors believed that Stinkmeaner's "love of hatred" kept him alive, as he dedicated the rest of his life to making everyone's lives a living hell. After beating Robert in a fight in the mall parking lot, Huey mistakes Stinkmeaner for a blind swordsman, specifically Zatoichi, and has his Granddad train to fight Stinkmeaner. By the time Huey realizes Stinkmeaner is a regular old man, having had the match legally sanctioned at the last second, to ensure no prosecution, the fight ended with Robert unintentionally killing Stinkmeaner. Ending up in Hell soon after, Stinkmeaner trains in martial arts before the events of "Stinkmeaner Strikes Back", where the Devil offers him a trip back to Earth to spread ignorance and chaos among black people, and to get his revenge on the Freemans, to which he obliges. Once back on Earth, Stinkmeaner possesses Tom DuBois to take revenge upon Robert, before being exorcised, when tricked by Huey into finding common ground with Uncle Ruckus, due to their equal hatred for black people. In the season 3 episode "Stinkmeaner III: The Hateocracy", serving as its narrator, Stinkmeaner is revealed to have belonged to a crew of violent, elderly hoodlums known as the "Hateocracy". Once notified of Stinkmeaner's death, the surviving members of the Hateocracy, a trio of skilled martial artists named Lord Rufus Crabmiser, Lady Esmerelda Gripenasty, and Mister George Pistofferson, reunite to attack the Freeman family, as it gave them an excuse to ruin someone's life. Luckily, as Crabmiser murdered Bushido Brown during the attack, the Hateocracy are arrested by the police. In the season 4 episode "Stinkmeaner: Begun the Clone War Has", it is revealed that Stinkmeaner enlisted in a cloning project prior to his death and left instructions for his clone, who is genetically enhanced, to continue antagonizing Robert. Eventually, after Robert newly descended to his level, the Stinkmeaner clone renounces the vendetta but still harasses the Freeman family.
- Reverend Rollo Goodlove (voiced by CeeLo Green) – Reverend Rollo Goodlove is an African-American left-wing activist and media proprietor, whose activism seems more about getting him media exposure than showing his opinion on the issue. He originally appeared in the Boondocks episode "The S-Word", as a supporter of the Freemans after Mr. Petto called Riley a racial slur during a confrontation. He then turned it into a political debate between himself and Ann Coulter, which was carefully orchestrated, giving him more media exposure. His protest was overshadowed, forcefully with rifles, by an elderly women's protest for the right to own guns. Granddad was certain he would have received lots of money for the incident. He helped Huey in a hunger strike in an attempt to pull BET off the air, but Rollo was offered a TV sitcom to be aired on BET, which led to him no longer aiding Huey's strike. His character is loosely based on Rev. Al Sharpton and Jesse Jackson.
- Cynthia "Cindy/C Murder/Fearsome" McPhearson (voiced by Tara Strong) – Cynthia is a girl who originally appeared as a recurring character in the comic strip as a girl in Huey's class who is oblivious to racial issues. She enjoys rap music, especially Snoop Dogg. In the TV series, she appears as an extremely-talented junior basketball player for her team, is well-versed, yet overblown, in AAVE, and matches Riley in cockiness. Riley soon resorts to insulting her mother and the problems related to her in Cindy's life to put her off her game, which leads to her crying and running off the court. She appears in the episodes "Ballin'" and "The Story of Gangstalicious Part 2", in Season 2, and in the season 3 episode "The Red Ball" as part of Huey's kickball team, although she doesn't speak. She has a bigger role in the Season 3 episode "The Fundraiser" as one of Riley's partners in his chocolate enterprise. Her visual appearance, particularly her hairstyle, is based on the video game character Cammy from the Street Fighter series.
- Bushido Brown (voiced by Cedric Yarbrough in the first appearance, Michael Jai White in the second appearance) – Bushido Brown is a kung-fu bodyguard hired by Oprah. For a while, on the show, he is the best martial artist, whose skills greatly surpass Huey Freeman. He appeared in the season one episode "Let's Nab Oprah" and the season two episode "Attack of the Killer Kung-Fu Wolf Bitch". He is killed in the season three episode "Stinkmeaner 3: The Hateocracy" after being decapitated in a fight with three elderly martial artists, the "Hateocracy", who were associated with Colonel H. Stinkmeaner, when they were out to kill Robert using a flying guillotine, at the time when he was protecting them. Before his demise, he is revealed to be an arrogant jerk who overcharges his clients for his services. After Bushido Brown's death, the Hateocracy members are arrested by the police for murder. Bushido Brown's character is heavily influenced by the character Black Belt Jones from Black Belt Jones and Williams from Enter the Dragon, both played by martial artist Jim Kelly, as well as Michael Jai White's own character parody "Black Dynamite" from the film Black Dynamite.
- Mrs. Van Heusen (voiced by Marion Ross) – Mrs. Van Heusen is a right-wing elderly woman who is head of the local neighborhood watch, and Second Amendment Sisters. When Ed the 3rd and Gin Rummy are engaging in their local crime spree, she tries militarizing the neighborhood watch after the Freemans. During the Fried Chicken Flu, she organizes another militia to try and take the Freeman's supplies.
- Deborah LeVil (voiced by Debra Wilson) – Deborah LeVil is the fictional head of BET, "Black EVIL Television", based on the real-life former head of Black Entertainment Television or BET, American businesswoman Debra L. Lee. LeVil is a psychotically evil woman dedicated to the network's goal: the destruction of black people. She has been shown to murder her employees when they do not meet her insidious standards. As she states, "It's not enough that the shows are bad. They have to be EVIL as well!". She is mostly portrayed as a female version of Dr. Evil from the Austin Powers film series. Her name may also be an allusion to Cruella De Vil.
- Cristal (voiced by Tiffany Thomas) - Cristal is a provocative-looking young woman. She briefly dated Robert Freeman, to whom it was unclear that she was a prostitute, and quickly became a nuisance to the boys, to whom it was obvious. While she describes herself as working "in sales", she is confirmed to be a prostitute under the watch of A Pimp Named Slickback.
- The Hateocracy – The Hateocracy is a gang of elderly, rude, selfish, demonic, violent, self-hating racist bigots and are the major antagonists of the episode "Stinkmeaner 3: The Hateocracy". In this episode, it is revealed that Stinkmeaner was the leader of this crew. They met each other at a retirement home. They hated each other at first sight, but hated everyone else more. They began terrorizing and killing people at the retirement home, eventually getting kicked out. Upon hearing about Stinkmeaner's death, the other three members reunited in order to get revenge on the Freeman family. The Freemans hire Bushido Brown to protect them, but he ends up getting on Robert's nerves and is fired. Just as he leaves, the Hatecracy appears on their front lawn, and Robert re-hires him. A fight ensues, and Bushido holds his own against the gang, but he ends up getting decapitated by a flying guillotine, a weapon used by the first member of the crew. Desperate not to share Bushido's fate, Robert apologizes to them for killing Stinkmeaner and says his death was an accident. The Hateocracy reveals that they didn't care about Stinkmeaner and that they used his death as an excuse to kill someone. The police then show up and arrest The Hateocracy. Members of the Hateocracy, besides Stinkmeaner, include:
  - Lord Rufus Crabmiser (voiced by Aries Spears) – Crabmiser is the second-in-command, and the most intelligent of the group. He is skilled in ranged combat. He is based on Fred Sanford from Sanford and Son. His weapon-of-choice is a reference to the 1976 movie Master of the Flying Guillotine. It makes the same sound effects when used.
  - Lady Esmeralda Gripenasty (voiced by Bebe Drake) – Gripenasty is shown to be skilled at White Lotus Kung Fu. She can be heard using foul language at her opponents while fighting them. She is based on Aunt Esther from Sanford and Son.
  - Mister George Pistofferson (voiced by Carl Jones) – Pistofferson is skilled at martial arts, and uses a more wild and brutal approach. He is based on JJ Evans from Good Times, as he is shown wearing the same hat as him and even shouts "Dynomite!" when Bushido Brown is decapitated.
