= Uncle Ruckus =

Fictional character from The Boondocks

- The Boondocks character
- Ruckus as he appears in the television series
- First appearance: "The Garden Party" (2005)
- Created by: Aaron McGruder
- Voiced by: Gary Anthony Williams

In-universe information
- Full name: Uncle Ruckus
- Occupation: Various part-time jobs
- Relatives: Mister Ruckus (father, deceased); Bunny Ruckus (mother); Darrel and Darryl Ruckus (younger twin brothers); Nelly Ruckus (grandmother, deceased); Uncle Ruckus (great-uncle)
- Ethnicity: African-American (de facto); Irish-American (claimed)

Uncle Ruckus (born July 4) is a fictional character and a frequent antagonist in the American comic strip The Boondocks and its animated sitcom adaptation. Created and designed by cartoonist Aaron McGruder, Ruckus is recognized as one of The Boondocks's most iconic characters.

His most notable trait is his internalized racism; he is an outspoken white supremacist and even claims to be an Irish-American who suffers from "re-vitiligo" (which, as Ruckus describes it, is "the opposite of what Michael Jackson got"). He also embodies many old American working-class stereotypes, as he is crude, short-tempered, obese, clumsy, rule-breaking, and a jack of all trades.

== Personality ==
In The Boondocks, Ruckus is portrayed as having a comical, intense hatred of anything related to African-Americans and goes out of his way to distance himself from them, especially those of older generations. He claims that God says the path to forgiveness for being black is to rebuke one's own race. He is extremely proud of the Irish ancestry he claims to have, although a DNA test showed him to be '102% African with a 2% margin of error'.

Although Ruckus had an abusive father, the main cause of his offensive personality and hateful view of the world is his mother who loved him deeply, but suffered from an inferiority complex coupled with extreme internalized racism. Despite a lifetime of abuse and poor decisions, her conviction that her life would have been better had she been born white resulted in Ruckus wishing that the African-American population was still enslaved or never existed at all. He frequently introduces himself as "Uncle Ruckus, no relation" to indicate that he has no familial connection to the people he is addressing. In the episode "The Color Ruckus", it is revealed his legal name is Uncle.

Ruckus frequently expresses white-supremacist views and makes derogatory comments about Michael Jackson, calling him a "lucky bastard" for his skin condition, vitiligo. Ruckus claims to have "re-vitiligo", which he believes keeps his skin tone dark. Ruckus uses a homemade ointment of bleach and sulfur, which he believes helps his condition though it is clearly ineffective.

In a flashback from when he was 20 years old in 1959, he is seen protesting against Martin Luther King Jr.'s marches during the civil rights movement and occasionally throwing bricks at him. Another flashback scene shows Ruckus serving on a Tennessee jury in 1957 that succeeded in convicting a blind black man of supposedly shooting and killing three white girls, with a Winchester rifle from about 50 yards away. Ruckus is the only black person on the otherwise all-white jury in a Jim Crow courtroom. During his first encounter with the Freeman family, Ruckus sings "Don't Trust Them New Niggas Over There" in the pilot episode, though he socializes freely with them afterwards.

Despite all of his flaws, Ruckus is shown to be hard-working and even enterprising.

== Jobs and lifestyle ==
Ruckus worships white people, society, and culture, explaining why he lives on the outskirts of the white majority suburb of Woodcrest. Ruckus states he likes the smell of white people, which he likens to "lemon juice and Pledge". Despite Woodcrest's newfound acceptance of different ethnicities, the neighborhood apparently does not find Uncle Ruckus' racist beliefs problematic. Ruckus can be seen employed in a variety of places performing a number of blue-collar jobs. However, not all members of that community agree with his racist outbursts. Rather, they tend to ignore them due to his constant racial profiling.

Ruckus has held a wide variety of jobs during the series such as a school bus driver (sometimes driving Huey and Riley to school), car parking valet, police officer, maitre d', janitor, gas station attendant, movie theater usher, and exorcist, as well as working at many of the town's establishments. In the banned episode "The Uncle Ruckus Reality Show", he claims to have 32 jobs over the course of the week, which is why he wakes up at 4:45 a.m. every morning. Despite having worked so many jobs, he continues to live in a dilapidated home and drives a beaten-up truck. At one point, he joined the police force after turning down a seven-figure settlement for being wrongfully shot at 118 times, claiming that the officers "were simply doing their job". Even after he becomes an officer, they still beat him on the pretext that "he has a gun". As an officer, he promises to make every black man's life as miserable as he possibly can.

Ruckus also becomes an evangelist after dreaming of going to "White Heaven". In the dream he receives advice from Ronald Reagan, and afterwards begins preaching that black people must hate their blackness and love the white man to receive entrance. The beginning of this episode is also one of the few moments of the series in which Uncle Ruckus admits, or even suggests, that he is or might be black. The episode starts with Ruckus knocking on Robert's front door with the news that he has been diagnosed with cancer. He proceeds to attempt to describe the specific type of cancer he has been diagnosed with in Latin, but fails to do so and ends it with "or some other big word my small, negro brain and big lips can't pronounce".

Although he is elderly and obese, Ruckus is shown to be strong enough to pull a car door off its hinges with ease and is an advanced practitioner of martial arts. He has proved himself to be Huey's equal on multiple occasions with his mastery of nunchaku and incredible acrobatic capability. In the series' second season, a sound-alike of "Jabba's Theme" from Return of the Jedi is used as a musical theme for Ruckus, drawing a parallel between the two characters.

In the episode "The Story of Jimmy Rebel", Ruckus records racist songs and sends them to his idol, Jimmy Rebel, a parody of Johnny Rebel, who is likewise a racist songwriter living in the fictional town of Spokenhoke, Texas. The songwriter and his label Racist Records love the songs so much that Rebel himself heads down to meet Ruckus. Ruckus initially introduces himself as Toby, Ruckus’s faithful servant, until he finally reveals that he is Ruckus himself. Rebel accepts the fact that he is black, and Rebel brings him to Spokenhoke to record songs with him. Ruckus ends the partnership due to his disappointment that Rebel is willing to record music with Ruckus, which Ruckus sees as a betrayal of Rebel's anti-black views. However, Rebel approaches Ruckus once again to reaffirm that they can continue making racist music and remain friends, and the two make a new song disparaging Mexicans.

The only episode where Ruckus does not display any animosity toward black people is "The Story of Gangstalicious Part 2". In the episode "The Color Ruckus", it is revealed that Ruckus' mother told him he was adopted and had white heritage. She also invented the disease re-vitiligo and told Ruckus that it alone was the reason he is physically indistinguishable from a normal black person. His father harshly claimed these explanations were lies meant to protect Ruckus' self-esteem, telling his son that he was "just another black nigga like the rest of us". Ruckus refused to believe his father's words and his mother continued to lie about his heritage.

== Relationships ==
Robert Freeman is the closest person to a friend that Uncle Ruckus has throughout the series, though Robert rebukes Ruckus' racist notions. For example, a friendly match of checkers between them ends bitterly after Ruckus makes white supremacist remarks. Ruckus is supportive of Freeman during his training for a rematch with Stinkmeaner and is the only one besides Riley who praises him when he fights and kills Stinkmeaner. Despite all this, Ruckus claims their friendship is a pretense, and that he still sees him as a "nigger". In the episode "The Real", Ruckus is also one of the homeless people that lives in Robert houses.

Uncle Ruckus says in episode, "...Or Die Trying" that he has despised Huey ever since the Freemans' arrival in Woodcrest, as he seems to ignore Ruckus' racist rantings, knowing that arguing with the man will do little good. However, when Ruckus challenges Huey to a martial arts showdown, Huey fights him twice – first with a push-broom handle as a staff and later unarmed. Neither fight is shown in its entirety. Huey is seen sitting in the theater manager's office after the first one and the episode ends in a freeze-frame as the second one begins. Both fights appear to be references to the Japanese manga series Fist of the North Star. Ruckus often gets angry at Riley for being a hoodlum, which regularly leads to fights.

Ruckus tolerates the Dubois family, largely due to Sarah's presence since she is white. He believes that Tom is lucky to have Sarah and that she is with him out of pity rather than love, even postulating at one point that she taught him how to read. He does not think much of Jazmine due to her mixed-raced status, pejoratively calling her a "mulatto" and a "little half-and-half". In a moment of relative kindness, he refers to her as a "nice little mixed-breed girl". After Riley tells Jazmine Santa Claus is not real, Ruckus cheers her up and restores her faith in Christmas and Santa.

== Film ==
McGruder launched a Kickstarter campaign with the aim of raising $200,000 in order to produce a film focusing on Ruckus. He stated that crowd-funding would be the sole source of funding for the film's budget. David Brothers of ComicsAlliance expressed concern that a film about the character might not be effective as a racial comedy outside the context of The Boondocks. The fundraiser, from January 30, 2013 to March 1, 2013, obtained pledges of $129,963, failing to meet its minimum funding goal of $200,000.
