= Boondocks (disambiguation) =

Boondocks are remote, usually brushy areas.

Boondocks may also refer to:

- The Boondocks (comic strip), a comic strip by Aaron McGruder
  - The Boondocks (TV series), the television series based on the aforementioned comic strip
- "Boondocks" (song), a 2005 song by Little Big Town
- Boondocks Road, a road in Texas
- The Boondock Saints, a 1999 action crime drama film
- "Down in the Boondocks" (song), a 1965 song by Billy Joe Royal
- Boondock, a fictional settlement in the Lazarus Long novel series by Robert A. Heinlein; see Time Enough for Love § "Boondock"

== See also ==
- Boondox (born 1985), rapper
