= Gary Anthony Williams =

American actor (born 1966)

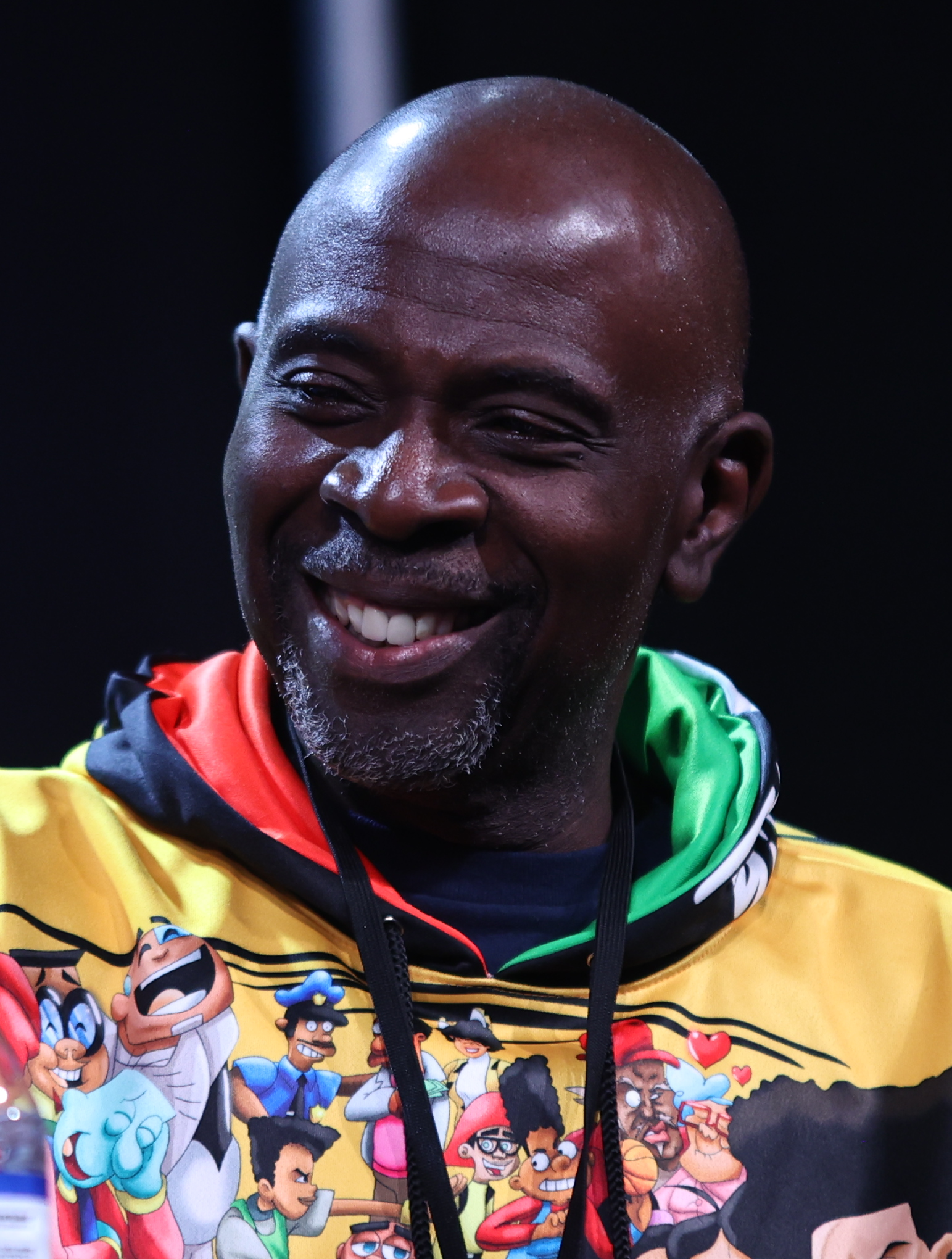
- Williams in 2024
- Born: March 14, 1966 (age 60); Fayetteville, Georgia, U.S.
- Occupations: Actor; comedian; filmmaker
- Years active: 1987–present
- Children: 1

Gary Anthony Williams (born March 14, 1966) is an American actor, comedian and filmmaker. He has voiced the character Uncle Ruckus on The Boondocks, General Horace Warfield in StarCraft II: Wings of Liberty, Dr. Richard Tygan in XCOM 2, and Anton "Bebop" Zeck in Teenage Mutant Ninja Turtles: Out of the Shadows. He has also appeared on shows such as Boston Legal, I'm Sorry, Malcolm in the Middle and The Soul Man. He was a cast member on the sketch comedy series Blue Collar TV and the improv comedy series Whose Line Is It Anyway?. He is also a co-founder of the L.A. Comedy Shorts Film Festival.

== Early life ==
Gary Anthony Williams was born on March 14, 1966, in Fayetteville, Georgia. He was involved in theater, comedy and television in Atlanta, where his credits include acting with the Georgia Shakespeare Festival, performing and writing for Agatha's: A Taste of Mystery and being a longtime member of Atlanta's longest running improv troupe, Laughing Matters. Williams had recurring roles in the television series I'll Fly Away and In the Heat of the Night, both filmed in the Atlanta area. He moved to Los Angeles in 1998.

== Career ==
=== Television ===
Williams' early roles include Abe Kenarban (Stevie's dad) in the Fox TV sitcom Malcolm in the Middle and Judge Trudy's Bailiff on Nickelodeon's The Amanda Show. Williams was a series regular on the WB Television Network sketch comedy series, Blue Collar TV. He appeared on NYPD Blue, Season 8, Episode 17, "Dying to Testify" as Charles, and guest-starred on How I Met Your Mother and Two and a Half Men.

In 2003, Williams had a small role in an episode of CSI: Crime Scene Investigation, "Invisible Evidence." During season three and four of Boston Legal, Williams appeared as part-time lawyer Clarence Bell, a pathologically shy man who expresses himself through characters, including crossdressing as women (including a nun and celebrities such as Oprah Winfrey). The role of Clarence/Clarice was originally to appear in one episode, but was expanded into a recurring role and then a regular role.

He returned as Abe in Malcolm in the Middle: Life's Still Unfair (2026).

=== Voice acting ===
Williams plays parts in five different shows on Cartoon Network's late night programming block, Adult Swim, one being a STRATA technician on Saul of the Molemen, another as the self-hating African American, Uncle Ruckus on The Boondocks, Coroner Rick, a recurring character on Stroker and Hoop, he also played the role of Paul Revere on the television special, The Young Person's Guide to History, and served as the voice-over announcer for The Eric Andre Show until 2013. He also voiced Riff Tamson in the opening three episodes of season four of Star Wars: The Clone Wars. He is also the voice of Mr. Dos on Special Agent Oso. He appeared on an episode of Hot in Cleveland as a drama teacher and soccer coach.

In 2009 and 2010, Williams provided the voice of the supervillain Mongul for several episodes of the animated series, Batman: The Brave and the Bold. On one occasion, he voiced the character's sister, Mongal. He also voiced the supervillain Thunderball in The Avengers: Earth's Mightiest Heroes.

Williams voiced the character Ray Johnson in the Mike Judge animated series The Goode Family. He was part of a segment in the show Beyond Belief: Fact or Fiction. Williams also guest stars as the halfway house director in the 7th season of the TV show Weeds. In 2011, he joined the cast of the animated series China, IL as the voice of Doctor Falgot. Williams was also in an episode of the show Workaholics. He was a series regular for the animated sketch comedy series Mad and voiced Mr. McStuffins for the animated Disney Junior series, Doc McStuffins and Dirty Dan and Dusty for the animated Disney Junior series Sheriff Callie's Wild West. He is also the narrator for the TV One series UNSUNG. From 2012 to 2016, Williams appeared as the recurring character Lester on the TV Land original sitcom The Soul Man.

He also was the voice for Mufasa in The Lion Guard and has provided voices for Star Wars Rebels. In 2017, he voiced Bark Knight and Baboo from the animated Disney Junior series Puppy Dog Pals. In the same year, he acted as Judge Eugene Ranheim in Curb Your Enthusiasm season 9 episode 3 “A Disturbance in the Kitchen”.

In November 2021, it was announced that Williams would be voicing the character, Beta, in the animated comedy-adventure series, Hailey's On It!, which premiered on June 8, 2023.

=== Film ===
Williams has appeared in films such as Undercover Brother, appearing as Smart Brother (having previously voiced the Undercover Brother character in the original internet animated series), Harold & Kumar Go to White Castle, and Soul Plane. On The Boondocks second-season premiere, titled "...Or Die Trying", Riley and Robert Freeman could be seen watching the Soul Plane 2 trailer, where they see Williams and John Witherspoon (the voice of Robert who was featured in the original Soul Plane) voicing fictionalized versions of themselves. He also voiced Sweet in The Trumpet of the Swan and a demon in the horror film Truth or Dare. He appeared in the film The Factory, starring John Cusack, with whom he also appeared in Midnight in the Garden of Good and Evil. In 2011, he narrated the feature-length documentary Ayn Rand and the Prophecy of Atlas Shrugged. He also played Melvin in House Party: Tonight's the Night and Anton Zeck / Bebop in Teenage Mutant Ninja Turtles: Out of the Shadows.

=== Improvisational comedy ===
Williams performed with the Flying Fannoli Brothers, a Los Angeles musical-improv group with Nick Jameson and Fuzzbee Morse. The group appeared at the fourth Big Stinkin' International Improv & Sketch Comedy Festival in Austin in 1999.

Williams has also performed in the improvisational shows Cookin' With Gas and The Black Version at The Groundlings Theatre in Los Angeles, and has returned to Atlanta to perform with Laughing Matters. Since 2013, he has been a recurring performer on The CW's revival of the improvisational comedy show Whose Line Is It Anyway?.

=== Video games ===
Williams provided the voices for the characters of Yancy Westridge in Alpha Protocol, Elanos Haliat in Mass Effect and Horace Warfield in StarCraft II: Wings of Liberty and Heart of the Swarm.

== Personal life ==
Williams has one son.

== Filmography ==
=== Film ===
Year	Title	Role	Notes
1994	Radioland Murders	Dr. Ashton-Reeves	
1997	Midnight in the Garden of Good and Evil	Bus Driver	
1998	Ride	Tiny	
1999	End of Days	Utility Worker #2	
2001	All You Need	Brian	
2001	The Trumpet of the Swan	Sweets (voice)	
2002	Undercover Brother	Smart Brother	
2004	Comic Book: The Movie	Kurt	Direct-to-video
2004	Harold & Kumar Go to White Castle	Tarik Jackson	
2004	Soul Plane	Flame	
2004	Jiminy Glick in Lalawood	Randall Bookerton	
2006	The Adventures of Brer Rabbit	Brer Bear (voice)	Direct-to-video
2007	Cook Off!	Lars Hagerbakke	
2012	Batman: The Dark Knight Returns, Part 1	Mutant Leader, Anchor Bill (voice)	Direct-to-video
2012	The Factory	Darryl	
2013	Batman: The Dark Knight Returns, Part 2	Anchor Bill (voice)	Direct-to-video
2013	House Party: Tonight's the Night	Melvin Johnson	Direct-to-video
2013	I Know That Voice	Himself	Documentary
2013	Scooby-Doo! and the Spooky Scarecrow	Mayor Husk (voice)	Direct-to-video
2013	The Internship	Bob Williams	
2014	Muffin Top: A Love Story	Gregory David Gregory	
2016	Teenage Mutant Ninja Turtles: Out of the Shadows	Anton Zeck / Bebop	
2017	I Don't Feel at Home in This World Anymore	Detective William Bendix	
2017	Scooby-Doo! Shaggy's Showdown	Cook (voice)	Direct-to-video
2018	Truth or Dare	Demon (voice)	
2019	5th of July	Cowboy	
2021	Spirit Untamed	Wrangler (voice)	
2021	Christmas...Again?!	Santa	Disney Channel Original Movie
2022	Block Party	Sean	
2023	Outlaw Johnny Black	Mayor Williams	

=== Television ===
Year	Title	Role	Notes
1990, 1992	In the Heat of the Night	Ramsey Morgan, Clay Wilson	2 episodes
1991	I'll Fly Away	Dayton	Episode: "Coming Home"
1995	The Client	Sonny	Episode: "Pilot"
1996, 1999	Profiler	Ben, Father Earl Stevens	2 episodes
1997	First Time Felon	Wallace	Television film
1998	Beyond Belief: Fact or Fiction	Playground Bully	2 episodes
1998	Brimstone	Fanaro's Neighbor	Episode: "Executioner"
1999–2002	The Amanda Show	Bailiff	8 episodes
2000	City of Angels	Nurse Elliot	Episode: "Oscar de la Boya"
2000	Men in Black: The Series	Additional voices	Episode: "The Back to School Syndrome"
2000–2006	Malcolm in the Middle	Abe Kenarban	18 episodes
2001	NYPD Blue	Charles	Episode: "Dying to Testify"
2001	The Wild Thornberrys	Forest Hog, Bushbuck (voice)	Episode: "The Trouble with Darwin"
2002	The Parkers	Randall	Episode: "And the Winner Is..."
2003	Tracey Ullman in the Trailer Tales	Slurr P	Television film
2003	All of Us	Principal Tovell	Episode: "Spatial Profiling"
2003	CSI: Crime Scene Investigation	Auto Detail Guy	Episode: "Invisible Evidence"
2004	Joan of Arcadia	Liquor Store Clerk God	Episode: "Recreation"
2004–2022	Reno 911!	Various	7 episodes
2005	Stroker & Hoop	Coroner Rick (voice)	6 episodes
2005–2014	The Boondocks	Uncle Ruckus (voice)	55 episodes
2006	Lovespring International	Wally Smither	2 episodes
2006–2008	Boston Legal	Clarence Bell	36 episodes
2007	Andy Barker, P.I.	Ron	Episode: "Pilot"
2007	Saul of the Mole Men	Strata Operators	10 episodes
2007, 2009	Curious George	The Coach, Businessman (voice)	2 episodes
2008	Young Person's Guide to History	Paul Revere	Episode: "Part 1"
2008	Chowder	Tofu, Rat #2, Egg #2 (voice)	Episode: "Shnitzel Quits"
2008	The Xtacles	Additional voices	2 episodes
2008	Chocolate News	Ron Don Wainscott-Merkeson, Edwin Hayes	2 episodes
2008–2009	Batman: The Brave and the Bold	Mongul, Mongal, Fun Haus (voice)	3 episodes
2009	Desperate Housewives	Reggie	2 episodes
2009	The Goode Family	Ray Johnson, Duncan (voice)	13 episodes
2009	It's Always Sunny in Philadelphia	Snowman, Raisin #2 (voice)	Episode: "A Very Sunny Christmas"
2009–2012	Special Agent Oso	Mr. Dos (voice)	23 episodes
2009–present	Unsung	Narrator	175 episodes
2010	How I Met Your Mother	Inspector	Episode: "Home Wreckers"
2010	Hot in Cleveland	Coach Taylor	Episode: "The Play's the Thing"
2010	Fred: The Movie	Laundromat Manager	Television film
2010	The Avengers: Earth's Mightiest Heroes	Eliot Franklin / Thunderball (voice)	Episode: "Thor the Mighty"
2010	Firebreather	Principal Dave, Troy's Dad (voice)	Television film
2010–2013	Mad	Various voices	29 episodes
2010–2014	Raising Hope	David Davidson, News Reporter	6 episodes
2011	Weeds	Ed Watson	3 episodes
2011	Scooby-Doo! Mystery Incorporated	Dr. Cavanaugh (voice)	Episode: "The Siren's Song"
2011	Star Wars: The Clone Wars	Riff Tamson (voice)	3 episodes
2011	Workaholics	Craig	Episode: "Old Man Ders"
2011	Kick Buttowski: Suburban Daredevil	Additional voices	Episode: "Brad's Room/Dude, Where's My Wade?"
2011	Happy Endings	Officer Jones	Episode: "Grinches Be Crazy"
2011	In Gayle We Trust	Zeke Robinson	7 episodes
2011–2013	Kung Fu Panda: Legends of Awesomeness	Lao, Tsao (voice)	3 episodes
2011–2015	China, IL	Dr. Jack Falgot (voice)	16 episodes
2012	Bubble Guppies	Additional voices	3 episodes
2012	How to Be a Gentleman	Sammy	Episode: "How to Be Draft Andrew"
2012	The Eric Andre Show	Announcer	9 episodes
2012	Motorcity	Mr. Gordy (voice)	Episode: "Reunion"
2012–2016	The Soul Man	Lester	12 episodes
2012, 2015	Black Dynamite	Various voices	2 episodes
2012–2020	Doc McStuffins	Marcus McStuffins (voice)	63 episodes
2013	Beware the Batman	Michael Holt (voice)	Episode: "Hunted"
2013	Pound Puppies	Additional voices	2 episodes
2013–2014	Turbo Fast	Various voices	2 episodes
2013–2015	Key & Peele	Various	4 episodes
2013–2022	Rick and Morty	Various voices	6 episodes
2013–2024	Whose Line Is It Anyway?	Himself	31 episodes
2014	Mike & Molly	Emcee	Episode: "Open Mike Night"
2014	Men at Work	Biggs	Episode: "Suburban Gibbs"
2014	Chozen	Repo Man (voice)	6 episodes
2014	Baby Daddy	Captain Walters	Episode: "Livin' on a Prom"
2014	Benched	Geoffrey	3 episodes
2014	Sofia the First	Hobwing (voice)	Episode: "The Curse of Princess Ivy"
2014–2016	TripTank	Various voices	10 episodes
2014–2017	Sheriff Callie's Wild West	Dirty Dan, Dusty, Sidekick Rustler (voice)	31 episodes
2014–present	American Dad!	Various voices	17 episodes
2015	Two and a Half Men	Leo	Episode: "For Whom the Booty Calls"
2015	Golan the Insatiable	Reporter (voice)	Episode: "Shame on Pee"
2015	Randy Cunningham: 9th Grade Ninja	Ward Smith (voice)	2 episodes
2015	The Awesomes	Additional voices	6 episodes
2015–2017	Pig Goat Banana Cricket	Various voices	4 episodes
2016	Star Wars Rebels	Gron, Stormtroopers (voice)	Episode: "Legends of Lasat"
2016	Transformers: Robots in Disguise	Slicedice (voice)	2 episodes
2016	The Loud House	Manager, TV Announcer (voice)	Episode: "Cereal Offender"
2016	Wrecked	Gary	Episode: "The Phantom"
2016–2019	SuperMansion	Various voices	10 episodes
2016–2019	The Lion Guard	Mufasa (voice)	16 episodes
2017	Son of Zorn	Sir Pent, Reverend	Episode: "The Battle of Self-Acceptance"
2017	The Thundermans	D-Tail	Episode: "May Z-Force Be with You"
2017	Secret Life of Boys	Qyle Stapleton	Episode: "The Visitor"
2017	Be Cool, Scooby-Doo!	Conductor (voice)	Episode: "Mysteries on the Disorient Express"
2017	Idiotsitter	Dean Arnold	4 episodes
2017	Curb Your Enthusiasm	Judge	Episode: "A Disturbance in the Kitchen"
2017	Superior Donuts	Howard	Episode: "Flour Power"
2017	Man with a Plan	Bob	Episode: "What About Bob?"
2017, 2019	SMILF	Philip	2 episodes
2017–2019	The Stinky & Dirty Show	Haul (voice)	4 episodes
2017–2019	I'm Sorry	Brian	10 episodes
2017–2019	Star vs. the Forces of Evil	Additional Voices	5 episodes
2017–2022	Bob's Burgers	Various voices	3 episodes
2017–2023	Puppy Dog Pals	Various voices	32 episodes
2018	Miles from Tomorrowland	Fortis, Hemeran (voice)	Episode: "Grendel's Moving Castle/The Great Gadfly"
2018	Hanazuki: Full of Treasures	Axo (voice)	Episode: "Dance on the Dark Side"
2018–2020	Star Wars Resistance	Kragan Gorr, Vic (voice)	11 episodes
2018–2023	The Neighborhood	Ernie	5 episodes
2019	Mom	Warren	Episode: "A Dark Closet and Therapy with Horses"
2019	Drunk History	Ted Patrick	Episode: "Good Samaritans"
2019	Bajillion Dollar Propertie$	Neil deCicely Tyson	Episode: "Held Breath"
2019	Just Roll with It	Smiley Waterman	Episode: "Family Squabbles"
2019–2020	Robot Chicken	Chef, Scruffy, Boy's Father, Steve Harvey, Soda Reporter (voice)	2 episodes
2019–2020	Tigtone	Memory Gnome, Barteener (voice)	8 episodes
2019–2020	Bless the Harts	Leonard (voice)	7 episodes
2019–2023	SpongeBob SquarePants	Various voices	3 episodes
2019, 2022	Love, Death & Robots	XBOT 4000 (voice)	2 episodes
2020	The Epic Tales of Captain Underpants in Space!	Dupe Licitous (voice)	3 episodes
2020	Robbie	Darryl	Episode: "Robbie vs. Ava vs. Danielle"
2020–2022	Central Park	Various voices	8 episodes
2020–2022	The Owl House	Perry Porter, additional voices	6 episodes
2020–2022	Solar Opposites	Various voices	4 episodes
2021	The Crew	Chuck Stubbs	10 episodes
2021	Invincible	Additional voices	2 episodes
2021	No Activity	Additional voices	Episode: "Breaking Bread"
2021	Scooby-Doo and Guess Who?	Tab Tatter's Ghost, Real Estate Developer (voice)	Episode: "The Legend of the Gold Microphone"
2021	The Harper House	Gbenge Bradley (voice)	9 episodes
2021	The Great North	New Kids on the Dock Vocalist (voice)	Episode: "From Tusk Til Dawn Adventure"
2021–2022	Baby Shark's Big Show!	Sherman (voice)	2 episodes
2021–2022	Archer	IIA Assassin, Judge (voice)	2 episodes
2021–2023	The Patrick Star Show	Various voices	8 episodes
2022	We Baby Bears	Various voices	3 episodes
2022	The Boys Presents: Diabolical	Ghost's Dad (voice)	Episode: "An Animated Short Where Pissed-Off Supes Kill Their Parents"
2022	The Cuphead Show!	Quadratus, War Demon #2 (voice)	2 episodes
2022	Home Economics	Jay	Episode: "Sunday New York Times, $6"
2022	South Side	Big Z	Episode: "South Suburbs"
2022–2023	Harley Quinn	The Shark Priest, Prince Shark, King Baby (voice)	2 episodes
2022–2023	Oddballs	Mr. McFly (voice)	10 episodes
2023	Velma	Sgt. Gigisfather, Private Eye (voice)	Episode: "Velma Makes a List"
2023	Agent Elvis	Redd Foxx, Sammy Davis Jr., various voices	Recurring role
2023	Rugrats	Hank (voice)	Episode: "Tot Springs Showdown"
2023	Strange Planet	Senior #2, Being #5 (voice)	Episode: "Greyscale Finger Bandit"
2023	Kiff	Flam Bingo, additional voices	2 episodes
2023	Aqua Teen Hunger Force	The Situpon (voice)	Episode: "Get Lit Upon a Situpon"
2023–2025	Moon Girl and Devil Dinosaur	James "Pops" Lafayette Sr., Garko the Man-Frog, Additional voices	Main cast
2023–2025	Night Court	Murray Flobert	Recurring role
2023–2025	Star Wars: Young Jedi Adventures	Zepher, additional voices	
2023–2024	Hailey's On It!	Beta (voice)	Main cast
2024–present	Ariel	Hermes, Wahoo (voice)	4 episodes
2024–present	Batman: Caped Crusader	Arnold Flass, additional voices	Recurring role
2024–2026	Max & the Midknights	Mumblin	Main voice role
2024–2025	WondLa	Rovender, Roshon (voice)	Main cast
2024	The Second Best Hospital in the Galaxy	Flork 1 (voice)	Main role
2024	Exploding Kittens	Additional voices	Recurring role
2025–2026	Chibiverse	Beta (voice)	2 episodes
2025	Eyes of Wakanda	Councilman Rakim (voice)	Episode: "Lost and Found"
2025–present	Iron Man and His Awesome Friends	Nuts (voice)	Recurring role
2026	Malcolm in the Middle: Life's Still Unfair	Abe Kenarban	Miniseries (4 episodes)

=== Video games ===
Year	Title	Role	Notes
2002	Britney's Dance Beat	Additional voices	
2002	Star Trek: Starfleet Command III	Additional voices	
2003	Evil Dead: A Fistful of Boomstick	Additional voices	
2006	Yakuza	Additional voices	
2006	ATV Offroad Fury 4	Additional voices	
2007	Mass Effect	Charles Saracino, Elanos Haliat, Citadel Control, Turian Diplomat	
2009	Halo Wars	Additional voices	
2009	Infamous	Male Pedestrian	
2010	Alpha Protocol	Yancy Westridge	
2010	StarCraft II: Wings of Liberty	General Horace Warfield, Tal'darim Executor, Void Ray	Also Heart of the Swarm DLC
2010	Batman: The Brave and the Bold – The Videogame	Mongul	
2016	XCOM 2	Dr. Richard Tygan	Also War of the Chosen DLC
2017	Horizon Zero Dawn	Burgrend	Also The Frozen Wilds DLC
2021	The Artful Escape	Angus, Bitbot, Resident	

=== Web series ===
Year	Title	Role	Notes
2011–2012	Off the Curb	Willie (voice)	Also co-creator
2019	Epic Rap Battles of History	Bill Cosby	Episode: "George Carlin vs. Richard Pryor"

=== Podcasts ===
Year	Title	Role	Notes
2016–2018	Spontaneanation	Himself	13 episodes

== Production credits ==
Year	Title	Director	Producer	Writer	Notes
2002	Undercover Brother	No	No	Yes	
2008	I Own You	No	No	Yes	
2010	Bun in the Oven	No	No	Yes	
2011	Sometimes Pretty Girls	Yes	No	Yes	
2012	Small Hand	No	Yes	Yes	
2013	Just Kidding	Yes	Yes	No	
2014	Bun in the Oven 2: The Rebirth	No	Yes	Yes	Executive producer
2014	Life Hacks for Kids	Yes	No	Yes	
2014–15	Bye Felicia	Yes	No	Yes	8 episodes
2015	$100 Pet Challenge	Yes	Yes	Yes	Executive producer
2015	Food Hack for Kids	Yes	No	No	
2016	It's a Snackdown!	Yes	No	No	8 episodes
2016	Hollywood or Hollywouldn't	Yes	No	No	Short film
2018	Life Hack for Kids: On the Road	Yes	No	No	10 episodes
