= Anthony Bell (director) =

American animator, film director, and screenwriter

- Born: California, U.S
- Occupations: Animator; storyboard artist; director; screenwriter
- Writing career
- Notable works: The Boondocks; Alpha and Omega; Alpha and Omega 2: A Howl-iday Adventure

Anthony Bell, sometimes known as Tony Bell, is an American animator, storyboard artist, film director and screenwriter. After getting his start as a character layout artist and cleanup artist for The Simpsons in the early nineties, he got the opportunity to direct many episodes for the Nickelodeon hit, Rugrats. Most recently, he has directed four episodes for the Adult Swim animated television series The Boondocks, and directed the animated comedy-drama film, Alpha and Omega, along with Ben Gluck. The film earned a cult following, despite its mixed-to-negative reception. Anthony returned to co-direct its sequel Alpha and Omega 2: A Howl-iday Adventure, after leaving the production of Norm of the North.

== The Simpsons ==
Bell worked as a character layout artist for thirteen episodes of The Simpsons between 1990 and 1992, including "Bart's Friend Falls in Love", "Lisa's Pony", and "Bart the Daredevil". Before this, he worked as a cleanup artist on such episodes as "Krusty Gets Busted" and "Some Enchanted Evening".

== Nickelodeon ==
Bell received his first directing gig for the television show Rugrats, contributing to an unspecified number of episodes. He directed the Rugrats TV movies Rugrats Vacation and All Growed Up. Bell also directed the following episodes of The Wild Thornberrys:

- "Valley Girls"
- "Only Child"

Bell also directed the following episodes of As Told By Ginger:

- "About Face"
- "Mommie Nearest"
- "Sibling Revile-ry"

== Happily Ever After: Fairy Tales for Every Child ==
Bell directed 13 episodes for HBO's Happily Ever After: Fairy Tales for Every Child:

- "The Three Little Pigs"
- "Ali Baba and the Forty Thieves"
- "The Bremen Town Musicians"
- "The Empress' Nightingale"
- "The Happy Prince"
- "Henny Penny"
- "The Frog Princess"
- "The Princess and the Pauper"
- "Rip Van Winkle (aka Rip & Vanna Winkle)"
- "The Snow Queen"
- "The Steadfast Tin Soldier"
- "Robinita Hood"
- "Aesop's Fables"

== The Boondocks ==
Bell has directed four episodes of Adult Swim's The Boondocks. He has not directed any of the second season's episodes, and it is unclear whether or not he will continue to contribute to the series. His credits, so far, include:

- "The Garden Party"
- "The Trial of R. Kelly"
- "Guess Hoe's Coming to Dinner"
- "The Real"
