= Riley Freeman =

Fictional character from The Boondocks

- The Boondocks character
- Riley Freeman as he appears in the first season of television series.
- First appearance: "The Garden Party" (2005)
- Last appearance: "The New Black" (2014)
- Created by: Aaron McGruder
- Voiced by: Regina King

In-universe information
- Species: Human
- Gender: Male
- Relatives: Huey Freeman (brother); Robert Freeman (grandfather); Cookie Freeman (great aunt); Jericho Freeman (fourth cousin)
- Nationality: American

Riley Freeman is a fictional character from syndicated comic strip The Boondocks written by Aaron McGruder and its TV series adaptation. He often refers to himself as "Riley Escobar", and in season two of the TV series, he also refers to himself as "Young Reezy" Also known as "The FundRaiser". He is Huey's younger brother who aspires to be like the rap artists and the gangsters that he admires.

Riley, who grew up on the South Side of Chicago, was moved along with his brother to Woodcrest, a peaceful, white suburb of Baltimore by granddad. Riley is eight. In some episodes, Riley and Huey share a single storyline and in others, they each have their own. Voiced by Regina King. It is strongly suggested that Huey and Riley's birth parents are deceased.

== Personality ==
Riley Freeman is an impressionable third grader who embraces the stereotypical "gangsta" lifestyle and lives his life like his idol rappers. Influenced by rap music and television, he tends to defend his idols even when his imitations go against common sense and righteousness. One example is his support of R. Kelly in "The Trial of R. Kelly": despite overwhelming evidence proving R Kelly's guilt, Riley believes he should not have to miss out on his next album. This is further shown in "The Story of Gangstalicious Part 2" where he dresses in effeminate clothing because Gangstalicious created the style. In order to be like his idols, he collects airsoft weapons and tags houses, as demonstrated in "The Garden Party" and "Riley Wuz Here". He is a fan of the movie Scarface in that he occasionally quotes lines from or alludes to the movie, and he has a white suit similar to the one worn by Tony Montana.

Riley seems to have a fair amount of criminal aptitude, as is demonstrated when he helped coordinate the kidnapping of Oprah Winfrey, and further demonstrated by his criticisms of Ed Wuncler III and Gin Rummy for their lack of criminal know-how ("Let's Nab Oprah"). Despite his pretensions to the contrary, Riley is not simpleminded: he can in fact be very resourceful and pragmatic, and "beats" Tom, a district attorney, in an argument over R. Kelly's confinement and trial. Perhaps due to idolizing the gangsta rap lifestyle he seems to have a level of street smarts possibly as great as his brother, often able to manipulate situations through lying and reverse psychology, which he refers to as getting into someone's "mental mind". Despite his crude thuggish lifestyle on rare occasions he has displayed acts of compassion (giving $100 to a panhandler he previously ignored and spat at).

Riley is quite brash and abrasive and often gets into undesirable situations without considering the consequences. He is rebellious and does not listen to anyone, especially Huey and Robert. He is brutally honest to the point of being very rude.

Despite the fact that Huey is forced to act as the voice of reason towards Riley's antics, usually without any success, Riley himself does become the voice of reason for his own friends, such as Thugnificent or Ed and Rummy.

When forced to fight, he resorts to a crude and thuggish form of attack, in contrast to his brother's carefully calculated attacks which seem rooted in martial arts. His method is simply to continue attacking, usually with concealed BB guns, and random objects, such as vases, or lamps. Riley sometimes overestimates his own crude combat abilities, such as when he tried to fight his brother in "Let's Nab Oprah". His thuggish fighting style, both with weapons and hand-to-hand, failed several times against the precision of Huey's martial arts ability. His street-fighting style has improved to a certain degree in season 3, best seen when he defeated Lamilton Taeshawn in the episode “Smokin’ With Cigawettes”. He does seem to have some talent with airsoft guns, as he fought Huey to a tie in season two. He has a strong amount of endurance and determination and given his previous beatings by his grandfather seems to have a high threshold for pain.

Riley has, in spite of himself, shown a great degree of intelligence from time to time. It has been shown he has a great understanding of the media world and music industry. This was shown when he tried to advise Thugnificent against starting a rap war with a much younger aspiring rap star Sgt. Gudder, knowing it would only cause unnecessary problems.

Riley is a talented artist, particularly with graffiti. His art is both eclectic and deep, ranging from depicting everyday objects to people. He has a creative manner of stylizing letters as well.

== Relationships ==
Huey Freeman

Huey and Riley tend to have a regular brotherly relationship despite their contradictory personalities. Due to the blunders Riley makes, Huey inevitably tries to teach him the error of his ways, but often to no avail. When their grandfather is not around, Huey usually will not hesitate to set Riley straight himself. In "...Or Die Trying", Riley does not have any problem with abandoning his brother to his fate, but in other episodes, he seems to trust him. Despite all this, Riley often insults his brother with the repeated phrase "Nigga, you gay," usually after receiving a hug (although he just distanced himself from Huey while speaking those words in the episode "...Or Die Trying"). In the Season 3 finale, however, Riley offers Huey a hug near the end without insulting him, but admiring Huey when they saw him on the television instead.

Robert Freeman

Robert Freeman is Riley's paternal grandfather. Riley constantly disrespects Robert and Robert mainly resorts to physical punishment to keep Riley in line, but Riley seems accustomed to this kind of disciplinary action to the point where it does not influence or change his actions in any significant way. He seems to not understand his grandpa's rules and gets whipped with his belt when he makes a bad choice. They are shown to be close at times and agree on things in season two. In season three, the two are seen to have "father and son" moments, such as when they go out to try the new fried chicken in "The Fried Chicken Flu". They also attempt to go to the inauguration of Barack Obama in "It's a Black President Huey Freeman".

Ed Wuncler III and Gin Rummy

Riley hangs out with them and refers to them as his friends. They are the closest thing to a gang that exists in Woodcrest. They have a great variety of real firearms and are free to commit any crime they wish since Ed's grandfather essentially owns the suburb. Riley sometimes accompanies them on their various misdeeds, and is not afraid to point out when their crimes are poorly-planned, or are only successful because of Ed's grandfather's status. However, Rummy dismisses Riley's reasoning and says they get away with crimes because he (Rummy) is a criminal mastermind. However, they tend to use him for their own personal gain, such as stealing his Granddad's car with knowledge that Riley will not reveal they did it, then when it was eventually returned, they stole his new bike, fitted with rims riding as they shouted: "Thank you for not snitching!...You stupid motherfucker!" Riley also contacts Ed when he needs additional muscle, such as when he tries to get his Lethal Interjection chain back from Butch Magnus or when he and Huey need to seek out the Xbox Killer.

Dubois Family

Riley likes to make fun of the Dubois family – especially Tom. He mocks Tom's unmanliness, breaks Jazmine's beliefs, and makes fun of Sarah's cooking. He outwits Tom, an attorney, in an argument about R. Kelly's trial and makes fun of Tom's fear of being anally raped in prison. He also mocks Sarah's cooking by comparing her peach cobbler to vomit with peas in it.

Cindy McPhearson

Cindy could be considered the white female counterpart of Riley and is initially an antagonist to Riley as seen in the season two episode "Ballin'". Cindy and Riley were initially rivals on different basketball teams in the local league, but in "The Story of Gangstalicious Part 2", Granddad invites her over to play with him, signifying a small amount of friendship. In the Season 3 episode "The Fundraiser", Cindy became a business partner of Riley's and helped him, Jazmine, and Phil, a seldom used stereotypical ignorant kid, sell large amounts of chocolate bars in order to make money. She becomes the last remaining partner of Riley, being the only one not to bail out of the organization. Her appearance in the TV series is similar to that of Cammy from the Street Fighter series.

Lamilton Taeshawn

Due to their gangsta-like behavior depicted in the episode "Smokin' with Cigarettes", Riley is initially shown to be friends with Lamilton Taeshawn, as they enjoy hanging out with each other and doing bad things, such as causing a car-pile up, going on a joyride on Lamilton's grandmother's car that he stole, and smoking with cigarettes. However, Lamilton shows more of his sociopathic behavior when he enjoys movie scenes of people being murdered, as well as killing a dog while trespassing into his owner's property, and even assaulted his grandmother when she refused to buy him chicken. These events start to disturb Riley greatly, and ever since then, Riley finds Lamilton to be so disturbing and sick in nature and refuses to hang out with him again, and Lamilton would often try to kill Riley in return, resulting the two kids to have a brawl on the school rooftop. Despite his enmity with Lamilton, Riley cannot bear to kill him as he tried his best to prevent Lamilton from falling off the school rooftop, though Lamilton did fall (thanks to his former psychologist Dr. Doomis forcing Riley to let him go), but survived.

Thugnificent

Thugnificent (Otis Jenkins) is Riley's favorite rap artist and neighbor. What can best be described as a "Professional Buffoon", Thugnificent was the leader of the group Lethal Interjection Crew. He had taken a liking to Riley and allowed him to join after irresponsibly having Riley perform several reckless and dangerous stunts. Riley and Thugnificent remained friends even after the downfall of Thugnificent's career.
