= The Boondocks (comic strip) =

American comic strip (1996–2006)

- Boondocks cast. Clockwise from top: Huey Freeman, Michael Caesar, Hiro Otomo, Riley Freeman, Cindy McPhearson and Jazmine DuBois
- Author: Aaron McGruder
- Illustrator(s): Aaron McGruder; Jennifer Seng (2003–2004); Carl Jones (2004–2006)
- Current status/schedule: Concluded daily strip
- Launch date: February 8, 1996; 30 years ago
- Syndicate: Universal Press Syndicate
- Publisher(s): Three Rivers Press; Andrews McMeel Publishing
- Genre: Satire

The Boondocks was a daily syndicated comic strip written and originally drawn by Aaron McGruder that ran from 1996 to 2006. Created by McGruder in 1996 for Hitlist.com, an early online music website, it was printed in the monthly hip hop magazine The Source in 1997. As it gained popularity, the comic strip was picked up by the Universal Press Syndicate and made its national debut on April 19, 1999. A popular and controversial strip, The Boondocks satirizes African-American culture and American politics as seen through the eyes of young African American radical Huey Freeman. McGruder's syndicate said it was among the biggest launches the company ever had.

== Publication history ==
The strip debuted on Hitlist.com on February 8, 1996. It later appeared in the University of Maryland newspaper The Diamondback under editor-in-chief Jayson Blair on December 3, 1996, paying McGruder $30 per strip—$17 more than other cartoonists. McGruder ended the strip's run in The Diamondback on March 18, 1997, two weeks after the strip was omitted due to a technical error and a Diamondback staffer printed the word "OOPS" in its place without an explanation. He pulled the strip after the paper refused to run an apology. (Upon the revelation in 2004 of news article fabrications by Blair, by then a reporter for The New York Times, McGruder's comic strip joined others in lampooning Blair.)

The strip was rejected by six syndicates — including the Washington Post Writers Group, Creators Syndicate, United Media, and Chronicle Features — before finally being picked up. Many of the syndicates that rejected the strip were supportive but felt that The Boondocks was "too edgy." An article from the summer of 1997 asserted that Universal Press Syndicate (UPS) was taking a "hard look" at the strip; UPS eventually picked it for syndication in April 1999.

In the fall of 2003, a Boston-based artist Jennifer Seng assumed art duties from McGruder. In an interview with The New Yorker, McGruder said, "If something had to give, it was going to be the art. I think I'm a better writer than artist." Carl Jones succeeded Seng as illustrator in late 2004. In the introduction to the collection Public Enemy #2, McGruder wrote, "I had hired an artist to help me on some of the art duties. People think I stopped drawing the strip, but that's never been the case. To this day there has never been a single Boondocks strip that I did not personally touch—I still obsess over the details of Huey, Riley, Caesar and Granddad. I still go over every panel. I still care what it looks like, and I always will."

On February 28, 2006, McGruder announced that his strip would go on a six-month hiatus, starting March 27, 2006, with new installments resuming in October. Repeats of earlier strips were offered by Universal Press Syndicate in the interim. The Boondocks was syndicated to over 300 clients at its peak, but more than half substituted different features rather than publish reruns during the hiatus. On September 25, 2006, Universal Press Syndicate president Lee Salem announced that the comic would not return, saying, "Although Aaron McGruder has made no statement about retiring or resuming The Boondocks for print newspapers ... newspapers should not count on it coming back in the foreseeable future." He added that Universal would welcome McGruder back if he chose to return. Greg Melvin, McGruder's editor at the syndicate, met with him in an unsuccessful attempt to talk the cartoonist into returning. McGruder cited his work on the show among other projects as reasons for not then returning to the strip. After the strip was canceled, reruns continued to be carried by some newspapers through November 26, 2006. Reruns of the strip are available online at GoComics.

In February 2019, a series of one-shot strips were published on radio personality Charlamagne tha God's Instagram page.

== Description ==
The strip depicts Huey Freeman and his younger brother Riley, two young children who have been moved out of the West Side of Chicago with their grandfather Robert to live with him in the predominantly white fictional suburb of Woodcrest (in Maryland, as seen from the area code stated in the March 16, 2000 strip). This relates to McGruder's childhood move from Chicago to Columbia, a diverse Maryland suburb. The title word "boondocks" alludes to the isolation from primarily African-American urban life that the characters feel, and permits McGruder some philosophical distance.

Huey is a politically perceptive devotee of black radical ideas of the past few decades (as explained in the May 4, 1999 strip, Huey is in fact named after Black Panther Huey P. Newton, who was named for Huey Long) and is harshly critical of many aspects of modern black culture. Riley, on the other hand, is enamored of gangsta rap culture and the "thug"/bling-bling lifestyle. Their grandfather Robert is a firm disciplinarian, World War II veteran, and former civil rights activist who is offended by both their values and ideas.

Huey's best friend is Michael Caesar, a dreadlocked aspiring MC who agrees with many of Huey's criticisms but serves as a positive counterpoint to Huey's typically pessimistic attitude by taking a humorous approach to issues. He is also a budding comedian, although most of his humor consists of trying to play "yo momma" jokes on Huey, which always fall flat. The Freemans' neighbors are NAACP member and assistant DA Thomas DuBois (a reference both to Uncle Tom and W. E. B. Du Bois) and his white wife Sarah, also a lawyer. Their young daughter Jazmine is very insecure about her ethnic identity and is often the subject of Huey's antipathy for being out of touch with her African ancestry.

The Boondocks was very political and occasionally subject to great controversy, usually sparked by the comments and behavior of its main character, Huey. The comic strip has been withheld by newspapers several times. In particular, the principal characters often discussed racial and American socioeconomic class issues. Because of its controversy and serious subject matter, many newspaper publishers either moved the strip to the op-ed section of the paper, pulled more potentially controversial strips from being published, didn't publish the strip at all, or canceled it altogether.

== Characters ==
=== Main characters ===
- Huey Freeman – A cynical boy who appears angry most of the time, with strident political awareness, and who sees himself as a revolutionary. Named after Huey P. Newton, co-founder of the Black Panthers, he is disturbed by the ignorance in modern-day American society and media. An observant, intelligent child, he often finds himself playing the voice of reason. Huey is fond of some conspiracy theories, and completely distrusts all authorities.
- Riley Freeman – The opposite of his older brother, Riley praises the "thug life," and admires and emulates the rappers and thugs he sees on television. He has assigned himself the nickname "Esco", a reference to the rapper Nas christening himself "Nas Escobar" in the mid-1990s after infamous drug lord Pablo Escobar. He also formerly had the nickname "Young Reezy", but that appears to have faded away with time. Other aliases he has given himself have included "Osama bin Laden" (chosen many months before 9/11) and Uday. Riley chose this last nickname on one of the extremely rare occasions he watched the news; he normally goes to great lengths to avoid the acquisition of knowledge. He once became upset after getting a C+ in school because he was afraid such "exemplary" grades would ruin his "street cred". Since asking for and not receiving rims for Christmas, Riley has been determined to sleigh-jack Santa Claus on Christmas Eve for the dual purpose of taking what he believes is owed to him and meting out punishment. In 2005, Riley's hair became progressively larger due to his lack of haircut; when it turned into an Afro he was able to trick people into thinking he was Huey until Grandad made him get cornrows.
- Michael Caesar – Huey's classmate and best friend who's known simply by his last name Caesar, who agrees with most of Huey's views of life. Unlike Huey, Caesar is more optimistic and cheerful, and usually jokes about whatever issue is at hand. It was Caesar's idea to find a boyfriend for Condoleezza Rice, reasoning that if she came to truly love somebody living on the planet she wouldn't be so "hell bent to destroy it." Caesar is originally from Brooklyn and needs little prompting to vocally represent his home town. He and Huey have co-founded the newsletter the "Free Huey World Report" and the annual "Most Embarrassing Black People Awards."
- Robert Jebediah "Granddad" Freeman – Huey and Riley's retired grandfather, a pragmatist and disciplinarian who usually sees through the shenanigans of his grandsons. Robert is known to panic at news reports, and values his own peace and comfort over the needs of others while still looking out for the children's welfare.
- Thomas and Sarah Dubois – An interracial couple in the neighborhood. They both work as lawyers. Tom is often seen talking (sometimes arguing) with Huey about current politics, while Huey tends to deride Tom for being a conformist yuppie, sometimes going so far as to sarcastically suggest that he is not really black. For a while Tom was kicked out of the house by Sarah after he called her a "two-timing political floozy" when she voted for Ralph Nader instead of Al Gore. Four years later, Tom kidnapped Nader in hopes of preventing him from taking votes away from John Kerry and costing the Democrats the 2004 Presidential Election. Huey eventually persuaded him to release Nader.
- Jazmine Dubois – Thomas and Sara's biracial daughter, who seems to like Huey, despite his general coldness toward her. She is notable for her insecurity over her biracial status. Jazmine is often portrayed as naïve, and is optimistic in contrast to Huey's pessimism. Early in the strip she was deliberately ambiguously colored so as to cloud the issue of whether she was white or black. It even prompted her to be directly asked by her teacher. She disappeared for roughly two years, and it was revealed she had been so frightened of terrorists that she would not leave her house. She tried to turn herself in to the FBI three times, because she thought she was helping the terrorists by being scared (having heard statements to the effect that "If you live in fear, the terrorists win"). She eventually came out because of a "Credible threat against her teddy bear." Jazmine is insecure about her curly and voluminous hair, wishing it looked straighter, like her mother's hair. Huey's suggestion to Tom that he and Sara try "emphasizing the natural beauty of her African features" rather than trying to help her change her appearance fell on deaf ears. On one occasion when Jazmine was complaining about her "big and poofy" hair, Huey interrupted her to ask what she thought of clouds. She thought clouds were pretty, but completely missed the point Huey was trying to make.
- Uncle Ruckus – an elderly, overweight black man who is notably racist and self-loathing. Depicted as the darkest skinned character, Uncle Ruckus is a self-hating man who believes himself to be a white man who turned black due to a fictional skin condition.
- Cindy McPhearson – A white girl in Huey's class who appears to be utterly clueless about racial issues. She shows a fondness and curiosity for rap music, particularly Snoop Dogg.

=== Minor characters ===
- Hiro Otomo – One of Huey's friends, a young Japanese-American DJ. Hiro only appeared in the original Diamondback version of the strip.
- Principal Williams – The principal of J. Edgar Hoover Elementary. An out-of-touch white man who prepared for the arrival of Huey and Riley by renting several blaxploitation films, mistakenly thinking of them as representative of black culture. He somehow has access to FBI files of Huey.
- John Petto – Huey, Cindy, and Caesar's white teacher, who is as clueless about how to handle them as the principal is. Old-fashioned and not used to black people, he is intimidated by Huey's intellect and has struggled trying to debate with Huey during class.
- Mrs. Peterson – Riley's teacher, who has a strict rule of giving her students no special treatment, where they must pull their weight or fail. Because of this, she once failed a girl from Romania, who was a math genius, but could barely read or write. Before she started teaching, she was originally a nun, then she worked in three maximum-security prisons. Mrs. Peterson has little patience for Riley and his street behavior.
- Flagee and Ribbon
- Psycho Star Wars Guy

== Controversies ==
The content of McGruder's comic strip often came under fire for being politically left-wing and occasionally risqué, leading to its being published in the op-ed section of many newspapers. For example, a strip making fun of BET's rap videos (some of which rely on the sexually suggestive gyrations of female dancers) and a strip mocking Whitney Houston's drug problems and emphasizing her buttocks, were pulled out of circulation. The Boondocks garnered significant attention after the September 11th attacks with a series of strips in which Huey calls a government tipline to report Ronald Reagan for funding terrorism. Soon after, he "censored" several strips by featuring a talking patriotic yellow ribbon and a flag (named Ribbon and Flagee, respectively) instead of the usual cast.

Several strips have been briefly pulled from prominent publications. For example, the "Condi Needs a Man" strip, in which Huey and his friend Caesar create a personal ad for U.S. Secretary of State Condoleezza Rice, portraying her as a "female Darth Vader type that seeks loving mate to torture", resulted in The Washington Post withholding a week's worth of strips, the longest such suspension ever by the paper. However, the paper's ombudsman, Michael Getler, later sided with McGruder. The Post also declined to run "Can a Nigga Get a Job?", which had black contestants compete on a reality TV show to work for Russell Simmons, only to find that all the contestants were rude and lazy.

McGruder has often attacked Black conservative commentator Larry Elder in the comic strip as well as the television series. In response, Elder published an opinion piece in which he created the "McGruder", an award for statements made by black public figures that Elder considers "dumb", "vulgar", and/or "offensive".

== Media ==
=== Collected editions ===
The comic strips have been collected into trade paperbacks:

- 2000: Because I Know You Don't Read the Newspaper (incl. Apr. 19, 1999 – Jan. 29, 2000 strips)
- 2001: Fresh for '01...You Suckas! (incl. Jan. 30, 2000 – Nov. 5, 2000 strips)
- 2003: A Right to Be Hostile (Treasury)
- 2005: Public Enemy #2 (incl. Mar. 12, 2003 – Nov. 13, 2004 strips)
- 2007: All the Rage (incl. Dec. 1, 2004 – Dec. 31, 2005 strips)

=== Television ===
The Boondocks TV series was a late-night programming block on Adult Swim that ran from November 6, 2005, to June 23, 2014, with a total of 55 episodes produced over the course of four seasons. A reboot of the series was announced in June 2019, but in February 2022, it revealed that the series was canceled and shelved.
