= Aaron McGruder =

American writer and cartoonist (born 1974)

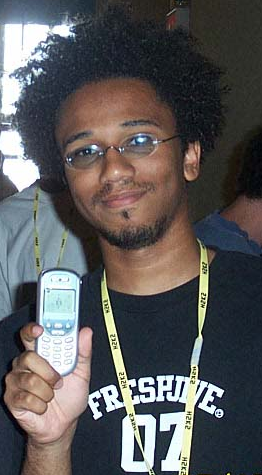
- McGruder in 2002
- Born: Aaron Vincent McGruder; May 29, 1974 (age 52); Chicago, Illinois, U.S.
- Education: University of Maryland (B.A.)
- Occupations: Writer; cartoonist; producer
- Writing career
- Genres: Comic strips, television screenwriter
- Notable works: The Boondocks (comic strip); The Boondocks (TV series)

Aaron Vincent McGruder (born May 29, 1974) is an American writer, cartoonist, and producer best known for creating The Boondocks, a Universal Press Syndicate comic strip and its animated TV series adaptation.

== Early life ==
Aaron McGruder was born in Chicago, Illinois. When McGruder was six years old, his family moved to Columbia, Maryland, after his father accepted a job with the National Transportation Safety Board. McGruder has an older brother.

McGruder attended the Jesuit school Loyola Blakefield from grades seven to nine. After two years he left the school and transferred to the public Oakland Mills High School. At the University of Maryland, he graduated with a degree in African American Studies.

== Career ==
=== The Boondocks ===
The Boondocks began in 1996 as a webcomic on Hitlist.com, one of the first online music websites. At the time, he was a DJ on The Soul Controllers Mix Show on WMUC. The Boondocks briefly appeared as a comic strip in the University of Maryland's newspaper The Diamondback, during Jayson Blair's tenure as editor-in-chief. McGruder signed a deal with the Universal Press Syndicate and in April 1999, the strip began appearing in 160 newspapers.

The comic strip's main characters are two young African-American brothers, Huey, named after Huey P. Newton, and his younger brother and wannabe gangsta, Riley, from inner-city Chicago, who are relocated to live with their grandfather in a sedate suburb. In six months, the comic strip was being distributed to more than 200 publications. Five collections of The Boondocks have been published: All The Rage, Public Enemy #2, A Right To Be Hostile, Fresh for '01: You Suckaz, and Boondocks: Because I Know You Don't Read The Newspaper. An animated television series adaptation of the strip was successful on Cartoon Network's Adult Swim.

In 2013, McGruder expressed interest in filming a movie featuring The Boondocks TV series supporting character Uncle Ruckus. Gary Anthony Williams would reprise his role. McGruder set a goal of $200,000 for startup donations at uncleruckusmovie.com between January 30 to March 1, 2013, but the campaign ended with 2,667 backers and $129,963.

In March 2014, The Boondocks was revived for a new season, but without McGruder's involvement as its showrunner. The first episode of the fourth season was first broadcast on April 21, 2014. In 2019, it was announced that a fifth season of The Boondocks would be produced with McGruder's involvement. The project was cancelled in February 2022.

=== Other work ===
Among his other projects have been the Super Deluxe variety comedy series The Super Rumble Mix Show. McGruder also developed Black Jesus, another comedy series broadcast on Adult Swim, part of Cartoon Network.

McGruder has developed into a public speaker on political and cultural issues. McGruder said in a 2002 keynote address at the July 12–14, 2002 H2K2 conference that he believed that President George W. Bush was involved with the September 11 attacks:

Outside of the world of whackos and conspiracy theorists and all of that, very few people in the mainstream have been willing to say what I'm about to say, which is, I really and truthfully believe that George W. Bush is somehow involved, either directly or indirectly, in the attacks on New York City on September 11.

During a 2003 reception hosted by The Nation, McGruder offended attendees by defiantly expressing his support for Ralph Nader's 2000 presidential bid. McGruder endured heckling and walkouts as he defended his commitment to left-wing causes, including, he claimed, calling Condoleezza Rice a "mass-murderer" to her face during the 2002 NAACP Image Awards. In 2009, Richmond, Indiana newspaper Palladium-Item reported that McGruder told a Martin Luther King Day audience at local Earlham College that then-President-elect Barack Obama was "not black". McGruder released a statement insisting he was misquoted, while maintaining he remained "cautiously pessimistic" about Obama's presidency.

In 2004, with Reginald Hudlin, McGruder co-authored a graphic novel, Birth of a Nation: A Comic Novel, about African Americans in East St. Louis during an election. The book's illustrations were drawn by cartoonist Kyle Baker.

In 2005, in celebration of Black History Month, McGruder was invited to provide a lecture at the Miami University of Ohio.

In 2010, McGruder worked as screenwriter in the final treatment of the feature film Red Tails, released in early 2012. Its story is based on the Tuskegee Airmen, a group of African American combat pilots during World War II.

In August 2017, it was announced that McGruder, along with producer Will Packer, would develop a series for Amazon Video called Black America, set in an alternative history wherein emancipated black Americans receive three Southern states as reparations for slavery and form an independent nation. The series' announcement was seen by some commentators as a response to HBO's then in-development alternative history series Confederate, whose plot entails a history wherein the Confederacy won the American Civil War; that series was ultimately never developed, with its cancellation confirmed in January 2020. Packer denied the project was a response to Confederate and was already in development when that series was announced.

McGruder was a Senior Writer on Grand Theft Auto VI, released in 2026.

== Personal life ==
By 2005, McGruder was residing in Los Angeles, where he was living as of 2013.

== Publications ==
Books

- The Boondocks: Because I Know You Don't Read the Newspapers (2000)
- Fresh for '01... You Suckas! (2001)
- A Right to be Hostile: The Boondocks Treasury (2003)
- Birth of a Nation: A Comic Novel, with Reginald Hudlin. Illustrated by Kyle Baker (2004)
- Public Enemy #2: An All-New Boondocks Collection (2005)
- All the Rage: Boondocks Past and Present (2007)

Book Contributions

- Knight, Keith (10 February 2005). The Passion of the Keef: The Fourth K Chronicles Compendium. Foreword by Aaron McGruder (First ed.). Manic D Press, Inc. ISBN 978-0916397678. OCLC 861830439. OL 8337655M.
