= Pause (The Boondocks) =

- The Boondocks episode
- Winston Jerome in drag
- Episode no.: Season 3 Episode 8
- Directed by: Sung Hoon Kim
- Written by: Aaron McGruder; Rodney Barnes
- Production code: 301
- Original air date: June 20, 2010

Guest appearances
- Affion Crockett as Winston Jerome; Kadeem Hardison as himself

Episode chronology
← Previous "The Fundraiser"	Next → "A Date with the Booty Warrior"
- The Boondocks (season 3)

"Pause" is the eighth episode of the third season of the American animated television series The Boondocks, and the 37th episode overall. Written by series creator Aaron McGruder, along with Rodney Barnes, and directed by Sung Hoon Kim, the episode originally aired on Adult Swim on June 20, 2010. The title refers to a practice used to remove any ambiguity after making a double entendre that may be possibly misinterpreted as a claim or implication of homosexual orientation. The phrase "no homo" may also be used instead of, or in addition to "pause".

== Plot ==
Robert plans to audition for the leading male role in Ma Dukes Finds Herself a Man, the latest play by Winston Jerome. Jerome is a superstar African-American playwright, director, and actor whose work, as Huey later describes, is formulaic, Christian-themed, and mostly centers around an outrageous gun-blasting matriarch named "Ma Dukes", played by Winston himself, in drag. As a former struggling actor in his youth, Robert is excited at the opportunity, and declares his intent to give Winston "everything I've got". Riley advises him that he has to say "no homo" in the addendum because, to Riley, "everything I've got" sounds gay.

Robert passes the audition and meets Winston himself, who is revealed to be a devout, closeted evangelical Christian who claims Jesus Christ himself personally inspired him to write. Winston offers him the part of Ma Dukes' love interest and invites him to his compound and inner circle, on condition that he accept Jesus as his savior and renounce Ice Cube and all of his works. At the compound, Winston makes a grand entrance to à la Rocky Horror Picture Show, descending on a golden elevator, while singing "It's All Right to Cross-Dress for Christ". From there, Robert quickly realizes that Winston leads a cult-like organization, forbidding the compound residents from contacting their family.

Forced to abandon his family, Robert suffers through grueling rehearsals and evades frequent advances by Winston, who later reveals that Robert has to kiss him in the play's final act. Despite this, Robert remains hopeful that the play will pay off with fame, riches, and "white women". Huey and Riley eventually attempt to rescue Robert from Winston's cult, but are unable to persuade Robert to leave even though it means kissing Winston on stage. Robert uses a metaphor of contestants on the reality TV show Fear Factor "eating monkey testicles" for a large prize, to make his point.

Two weeks later, the play premieres to a packed house, with Huey and Riley attending. Following the performance, Robert expects to be showered with adulation from attractive women, but to his chagrin, finds that Winston Jerome's female fans are obese middle-aged housewives. Winston later offers Robert the lead in the film version of Ma Dukes Finds Herself a Man, but flatly demands sexual favors in return. Finally fed up, Robert flips Winston off, leaves his dressing room, and returns home with Huey and Riley, though not without enduring more "pause" taunts from Riley, who videotaped the play.

== Cultural references ==
The character Winston Jerome is a parody of playwright and filmmaker Tyler Perry. Jerome's character Ma Dukes, whom he portrays by crossdressing, corresponds to Tyler Perry's character Madea.

Winston introduces himself to Robert as Ma Dukes in a dance sequence similar to that of "Time Warp" in The Rocky Horror Picture Show.

== Production ==
The script for "Pause" was written over a year before it aired. In the original script, McGruder made little effort to disguise Perry's identity, using a name very similar to Perry's legal name for the character before, under network instruction, changing it to "Winston Jerome". McGruder had wanted "Pause" to be the season opener, but it was moved.

== Reception ==
Greg Braxton of the Los Angeles Times cited "Pause" as one of the sharpest public criticisms of [Tyler] Perry" and situated it alongside other critiques of Perry's work from African American filmmakers like Spike Lee.

Leonard Pierce of The A.V. Club graded the episode a B+, writing that although the episode felt at times "directionless" it nonetheless featured "a bunch of good laugh lines, a dynamite ending, and an increased role for some characters that have been neglected of late".

Tyler Perry was infuriated by "Pause", contacting Turner Broadcasting executives, and threatening to re-evaluate his relationship with the company. When "Pause" aired, Perry had two series broadcast on Turner networks, Tyler Perry's House of Payne and Meet the Browns on TBS. Following an encore airing on June 26, 2010, the episode did not rerun again on Adult Swim until May 29, 2020, as a part of a marathon featuring the previously banned episodes, "The Hunger Strike" and "The Uncle Ruckus Reality Show".
