= The Boondocks season 4 =

The Boondocks
- Season 4
- DVD cover
- No. of episodes: 10

Release
- Original network: Adult Swim
- Original release: April 21 – June 23, 2014

Season chronology
- ← Previous; Season 3

The fourth season of the animated television series The Boondocks premiered in the United States on Cartoon Network's late night programming block, Adult Swim, on April 21, 2014, with "Pretty Boy Flizzy", and ended with "The New Black" on June 23, 2014, with a total of ten episodes. The season was produced without any involvement from series creator Aaron McGruder nor from executive producer Carl Jones. This is the only season animated by Studio Mir. The season received negative reviews from both critics and fans, with many calling it an unsatisfying conclusion.

== Episodes ==
No. overall	No. in season	Title	Directed by	Written by	Original release date	Prod. code	US viewers (millions)
46	1	"Pretty Boy Flizzy"	Hea Young Jung	Angela Nissel	April 21, 2014	404	2.99
R&B sensation Pretty Boy Flizzy (Michael B. Jordan) is arrested for armed robbery and while he's in the town of Woodcrest, district attorney Tom DuBois agrees to be his lawyer in exchange for advice to help in his marriage to his Caucasian wife, Sarah. Guest star: Michael B. Jordan as Pretty Boy Flizzy.
47	2	"Good Times"	Dae Woo Lee	Rodney Barnes (story); Angela Nissel (screenplay)	April 28, 2014	401	2.27
The Freemans' lives turn into Good Times when Robert tells his grandsons that he lost all of his money and they are poor. Though it seemed Ed Wuncler Jr. is helping him get back on his feet, the events only lead to Robert getting himself into further debt and it soon leaves the Freemans being part of a slavery program. Guest star: Eddie Griffin as himself.
48	3	"Breaking Granddad"	Dae Woo Lee	Rodney Barnes (story); Angela Nissel (screenplay)	May 5, 2014	402	2.19
In this parody of television series Breaking Bad, Robert sells an explosive material that Huey made from dangerous chemicals as a hair relaxer. This results in the Freemans finding themselves on the run from a black market salon owner, Boss Willona (Jenifer Lewis). Guest star: Jenifer Lewis as Boss Willona.
49	4	"Early Bird Special"	Hea Young Jung	Angela Nissel	May 12, 2014	410	2.19
In his continuing saga of trying to regain his lost money, Robert Jebediah Freeman becomes a prostitute for lonely women at a nursing home thanks to two violent female pimps. Guest star: Jenifer Lewis as Geraldine.
50	5	"Freedom Ride or Die"	Kwang Il Han	Rodney Barnes	May 19, 2014	403	1.93
During the civil rights movement, a young Robert Freeman is held as an unwilling freedom rider on a trip through the racist South with a group of other freedom riders led by Sturdy Harris (Dennis Haysbert). Guest star: Dennis Haysbert as Sturdy Harris.
51	6	"Granddad Dates a Kardashian"	Kwang Il Han	Angela Nissel	May 26, 2014	407	1.96
Robert begins dating a long-lost Kardashian sister named Kardashia (Grey DeLisle) and winds up on a reality show. Soon, Huey finds out that Kardashia's butt is growing bigger from implants, which explodes during a date. Kardashia later dies in her hospital bed as a result after it is revealed that she is not a real Kardashian with the pilot never pitched. Guest star: Grey DeLisle as Kardashia.
52	7	"Freedomland"	Dae Woo Lee	Rodney Barnes	June 2, 2014	409	1.90
The Freemans end up working out Robert's debt in Ed Wuncler Jr.'s slavery-amusement park Freedomland. However, Huey rallies everyone else who is in debt and forced to work in Freedomland to rebel and regain their freedom.
53	8	"I Dream of Siri"	Hea Young Jung	Angela Nissel	June 9, 2014	408	1.91
Robert buys an iPhone for the phone's program, Siri (Grey DeLisle). But Siri becomes psychotic and obsessed with Robert and proceeds to ruin his life when he gets rid of her for an Android phone, that she hacks, forcing him to marry her. Guest star: Grey DeLisle as Siri.
54	9	"Stinkmeaner: Begun the Clone War Has"	Kwang Il Han	Angela Nissel	June 16, 2014	406	1.93
The clone of Colonel H. Stinkmeaner becomes a celebrity after a video of his fight with Granddad goes viral, but Granddad soon becomes so enraged in hate he becomes blind and begins to act just like Stinkmeaner. Guest star: Edward Asner as Ed Wuncler.
55	10	"The New Black"	Dae Woo Lee	Rodney Barnes	June 23, 2014	405	1.82
Riley Freeman is once again targeted at school for using the words "gay" and "retarded" in an insulting manner, which soon puts the Freemans in an alliance once again with an unlikely ally: Rev. Rollo Goodlove. Guest star: Tommy "Tiny" Lister Jr. as Filbert Slowlove.

== Reception ==
On review aggregator website Rotten Tomatoes, the fourth season holds a rating of 36% based on 8 reviews.
