= The Uncle Ruckus Reality Show =

- The Boondocks episode
- Ruckus with his shrine to "the most soulful soul singer to ever live", Barry Manilow
- Episode no.: Season 2 Episode 15
- Directed by: Seung Eun Kim
- Written by: Aaron McGruder; Rodney Barnes
- Production code: 210
- Original air dates: March 16, 2008 (Teletoon); June 10, 2008 (United States, DVD); May 29, 2020 (Adult Swim)

Guest appearances
- Donald Faison as Wedgie Rudlin; Debra Wilson as Debra Leevil

Episode chronology
← Previous "The Hunger Strike"	Next → "It's a Black President, Huey Freeman"
- The Boondocks (season 2)

"The Uncle Ruckus Reality Show" is the fifteenth and final episode of the second season of the animated television series The Boondocks, and the 30th episode overall. It was written by series creator Aaron McGruder, along with Rodney Barnes, and directed by Seung Eun Kim. The episode aired in the United States on May 29, 2020. Prior to the broadcast, the episode aired in Canada on Teletoon on March 16, 2008, and was released on DVD in the United States on June 10, 2008.

== Plot ==
The episode begins inside the BET headquarters, with the fictional president of entertainment Wedgie Rudlin holding the Monday staff meeting on Thursday and calling himself the "new, super-duper smart, Harvard University-educated President of Entertainment." After asking staff members why he was hired, Rudlin says it's time to take BET in a new direction. After firing a board member, Rudlin tells his staff to make "The Uncle Ruckus Reality Show" happen.

Following the opening credits, Uncle Ruckus is shown chronicling his life. His day typically starts at 4:45am with him praying to "The White Man" and apologizing for blacks. Ruckus denies being black, stating that he suffers from "Re-vitiligo", the opposite of what Michael Jackson claimed he had, and applies an ointment composed of bleach and sulfur.

Ruckus goes on to talk about his shrines to his white heroes, including John Wayne, George H. W. Bush, and Barry Manilow. He mentions that he works 32 jobs, including as a bus driver, where he is ignored and insulted by the suburban kids, but he refers to them as being "pure". Ruckus stops the Freeman brothers from boarding, the only kids who show him a shred of respect, and tells them: "This bus is for kids with a future!"

Ruckus is next seen at J. Edgar Hoover Elementary, working as a janitor, mopping the hall, bemoaning desegregation, and ranting about black people in education and films. After school, Ruckus approaches Jazmine and asks if she is waiting for her father Tom, explaining to the camera that Tom is lucky to be married to a white woman. Tom arrives in a kilt and tells Ruckus of his Scottish heritage and how he took a DNA test that revealed he was 32.5% Scottish.

Ruckus then visits a scientist and receives the results of his ethnic makeup. Midway through the scene, the action pans back to BET, where Rudlin tells Debra Leevil—the same parody of BET CEO Debra L. Lee seen in the previous episode—to start BET animation, in order to destroy the minds of black kids at a younger age. A board member shows Leevil his creation: "Super Cyborg Mandigo Man", with the script in flipbook form, showing a stick figure throwing a spear. Leevil, unimpressed because the show isn't evil enough, summons her associates, "Big Nigga" and "Crazy Bitch", to beat up the board member, who screams unsuccessfully for Rudlin to save him. Leevil then asks about the Uncle Ruckus show, and Rudlin tells her it is indeed evil. Leevil issues a threat of killing, or at least serious injury, in case it isn't.

On the show, Ruckus receives his DNA test results, which reveal that he is 102% African with a 2% margin of error. He retreats into a bed-bound depression and quits all his jobs and contemplates selling crack, rapping, or even rapping about selling crack. He starts doubting he has re-vitiligo and calls on the Freemans for advice on how to be black. Robert points out there's nothing wrong with being black. In a sports store, probably Foot Locker, Ruckus complains about no shoes named after white men. Afterward, while getting his hair cut at a salon, Ruckus overhears a political conversation and jumps to the defense of U.S. president George W. Bush, consequently getting kicked out.

Meanwhile, Rudlin kidnaps the doctor who gave Ruckus his results, and forces him to send new results after unsuccessfully torturing him. The power for the building and the 'torture machine' went out, since the electric bill wasn't paid.

Ruckus tries everything to adjust to his new status, including reading Ebony Magazine and drinking malt liquor. Ruckus contemplates suicide, but Rudlin arrives and prevents it. The scientist arrives, blames the "mistake" on a black intern, and reveals new results: Ruckus is 50.07% Caucasian.

The episode ends with Ruckus, as a crossing guard, stating he has a "whole new perspective on life" and "a lot more sympathy" towards colored folks. Huey and Riley walk past and Ruckus assures them it's safe to cross, then lets a large truck drive towards them. The truck narrowly misses them, prompting Ruckus to laugh at their misfortune.

== Airing and BET ==
There have been rumors that this and its preceding one, "The Hunger Strike", were initially banned from airing in the United States due to threatened litigation from BET. Sony Pictures Television, which produces the series, did not issue a statement on the matter. The episodes are said to specifically attack Reggie Hudlin, BET's president of entertainment from 2005 to 2008, and Debra L. Lee, president and chief executive officer of BET Holdings, the parent company of BET.

Lee is portrayed as Deborah Leevil, a parody of the character Dr. Evil from the Austin Powers movies, and Hudlin is portrayed as Wedgie Rudlin, a "culturally insensitive buffoon coasting on his Ivy League education." In this episode, Leevil channels Dr. Evil by placing her finger near her mouth when excited or emphasizing a statement, or using the word "evil." Leevil also speaks in much the same way as Doctor Evil.

It is noted that Hudlin was responsible for producing The Boondocks with McGruder before serving as president of BET from 2005 to 2008, effectively ending the partnership between the two. McGruder is known to be very critical of the television network's work and programming.
