= The Boondocks season 3 =

The Boondocks
- Season 3
- DVD cover
- No. of episodes: 15

Release
- Original network: Adult Swim
- Original release: May 2 – August 15, 2010

Season chronology
- ← Previous; Season 2 Next → Season 4

The third season of the animated television series The Boondocks originally aired in the United States on Cartoon Network's late night programming block, Adult Swim. Season three started on May 2, 2010, with "It's a Black President, Huey Freeman" and ended with "It's Goin' Down" on August 15, 2010, with a total of fifteen episodes. The season debuted at 2.55 million viewers.

All fifteen episodes from season three were released completely uncensored on a three-disc DVD set in the United States on November 9, 2010. In addition all episodes from season three are available on the iTunes Store.

== Production ==
Sung Dae Kang and Young Chan Kim served as directors for season three, and series creator Aaron McGruder and Rodney Barnes served as writers for season three. All episodes were rated TV-MA for graphic violence, dangerous activity (mostly involving children), explicit language (mostly heavy use of racist, sexist, and homophobic slurs and bleeped-out profanity), and infrequent instances of strong sexual content. Season three was originally announced to be the show's last; it would ultimately be the last season produced with McGruder's involvement.

The episode "The Story of Jimmy Rebel" was banned after its first showing on Adult Swim for excessive depictions of racism and perceived racial insensitivities over the episode's portrayal of a racist country singer named Jimmy Rebel (a parody of real-life white supremacist country singer Johnny Rebel). The episodes were released as part of the complete series DVD set and Netflix has also streamed the missing episode in Canada.

Season three features guest appearances from Werner Herzog, Bill Maher, DJ Vlad, Charlie Murphy, Edward Asner, Michael Jai White, Aries Spears, John Landis, Clifton Powell, Samuel L. Jackson, Billy Dee Williams, Gina Torres, Mark Hamill, Marion Ross, Kadeem Hardison, Luenell, Don 'D.C.' Curry, Star Jones, and John C. McGinley.

== Episodes ==
No. overall	No. in season	Title	Directed by	Written by	Original release date	Prod. code
31	1	"It's a Black President, Huey Freeman"	Sung Dae Kang	Aaron McGruder	May 2, 2010	304
Werner Herzog follows the Freeman family and other Woodcrest residents from the 2008 United States presidential election to the inauguration of America's first black president, as flashbacks resembles the coverage of the documentary, including their expressions and personal reactions: Huey is indifferent; Robert and Riley are supportive of Obama; Tom worries about Sarah's sexual attraction to Obama; Thugnificent joins the celebrity bandwagon after realizing he was oblivious to the political campaign; and Uncle Ruckus contributes his critical racist antics. Werner Herzog and Bill Maher guest star as themselves.
32	2	"Bitches to Rags"	Young Chan Kim	Aaron McGruder	May 9, 2010	302
When Thugnificent's new album flops, he starts a rap beef that gets him dropped from his record label, which leads to legal trouble from the IRS. So he looks for a new job. Charlie Murphy and DJ Vlad guest star as Ed Wuncler III and himself respectively. Notes: This is the only episode where Huey has no lines, although he appears near the episode's end. This episode is also a parody of Soulja Boy's beef with Ice-T following Ice-T's critical remarks of the former during a 2008 radio interview.
33	3	"The Red Ball"	Young Chan Kim	Aaron McGruder	May 16, 2010	306
When the Chinese call in some old debts, Ed Wuncler is forced to gamble all of Woodcrest's economic fortunes on a kickball game with its sister city, Wushung, China; Huey, a former pro at the sport, comes out of self-imposed exile to play kickball with some of the in-need residents. Note: Throughout the episode there are many references to Shaolin Soccer and an episode of Samurai Champloo called "Baseball Blues". Edward Asner, Charlie Murphy, Sab Shimono, Tiffany Espensen, and Dante Basco guest star as Ed Wuncler, Ed Wuncler III, Mr. Long Dou, Ming Dou, and Jigme respectively.
34	4	"The Story of Jimmy Rebel"	Sung Hoon Kim	Aaron McGruder	May 23, 2010	303
Uncle Ruckus's favorite racist music artist, Jimmy Rebel, visits when he becomes highly interested in his submitted racial music recording. Note: Jimmy Rebel is a parody of real racist Cajun singer Johnny Rebel. Greg Travis guest stars as Jimmy Rebel. Note: This episode has not aired on Adult Swim since the week of its premiere and is not available on HBO Max. The episode is still available on DVD and digital storefronts.
35	5	"Stinkmeaner 3: The Hateocracy"	Sung Dae Kang	Aaron McGruder	May 30, 2010	307
Colonel H. Stinkmeaner's old crew, "The Hateocracy", arrive in town to exact payback on the Freeman family who, outmatched by Stinkmeaner's crew, hire Bushido Brown to protect them. Unfortunately, they discover how arrogant he is. Michael Jai White, Aries Spears, and Charlie Murphy guest star as Bushido Brown, Rufus Crabmiser, and Ed Wuncler III respectively. Note: The episode references 28 Weeks Later, Master of the Flying Guillotine, Naruto, Good Times, and Sanford and Son. Rated: TV-MA-V for strong graphic violence
36	6	"Smokin' with Cigarettes"	Sung Hoon Kim	Aaron McGruder	June 6, 2010	309
Riley has the time of his life when he befriends juvenile felon Lamilton Taeshawn, but Lamilton wants to cause more than trouble. Bobb'e J. Thompson guest stars as Lamilton Taeshawn. Note: This episode, based on news stories about a child who takes his grandmother's car for a joyride and on another occasion orders chicken against his grandmother's wishes, heavily references the hip-hop film Juice and the horror film Halloween.
37	7	"The Fundraiser"	Sung Dae Kang	Aaron McGruder	June 13, 2010	310
Riley organizes a fundraiser with Jazmine Dubois, Cindy McPhearson, and other Woodcrest kids, but they get too competitive and the money doesn't go to the needy. Charlie Murphy guest stars as Ed Wuncler III. Note: This episode heavily references the films Scarface, Layer Cake, Goodfellas and State Property.
38	8	"Pause"	Sung Hoon Kim	Aaron McGruder (story); Rodney Barnes (screenplay)	June 20, 2010	301
Megasuperstar of stage and screen Winston Jerome casts Granddad in a leading role, but the theater group turns out to be a homoerotic evangelistic cult and Huey and Riley try to sabotage the play. Note: This episode references to the rock musical film The Rocky Horror Picture Show and Tyler Perry plays. Note 2: Winston Jerome is a parody of Tyler Perry. Affion Crockett and Kadeem Hardison guest-star as Winston Jerome and himself respectively.
39	9	"A Date with the Booty Warrior"	Young Chan Kim	Aaron McGruder	June 27, 2010	308
Having conquered his fear of prison rape, Tom volunteers to lead Huey, Riley, and some classmates on a trip to jail as part of a "Scared Stiff" program, but when a riot breaks out, Tom is pursued by an imprisoned rapist while trying to get the kids out safely; during the riot, Huey and Riley help black prisoners organize a riot committee that makes outrageous demands. Note: The Booty Warrior is based on Fleece Johnson, an inmate profiled on the MSNBC show Lockup. John Landis and Clifton Powell guest star as the Counseling Group Leader and one of the prisoners respectively.
40	10	"The Story of Lando Freeman"	Sung Dae Kang	Aaron McGruder	July 4, 2010	312
A new handyman in Woodcrest claims to be Granddad's long-lost son, Lando (Slink Johnson), so Granddad seeks a talk-show paternity test. Note: The talk show is a parody of The Steve Wilkos Show. Samuel L. Jackson, Billy Dee Williams, and John DiMaggio guest star as Gin Rummy, himself, and Steve Wilkos respectively.
41	11	"Lovely Ebony Brown"	Young Chan Kim	Aaron McGurder (story); Rodney Barnes (screenplay)	July 11, 2010	311
Granddad meets a young black woman named Ebony who meets all of his high standards and they have a date. Gina Torres guest stars as Ebony Brown.
42	12	"Mr. Medicinal"	Sung Hoon Kim	Aaron McGruder	July 18, 2010	313
After a checkup, a doctor warns Granddad that he could die any day if he doesn't get his stress levels down. Not wanting to become dependent on pills, he takes Thugnificent's suggestion and turns to marijuana, leading to an extreme obsession and legal issues. Mark Hamill guest stars as Grant.
43	13	"The Fried Chicken Flu"	Sung Dae Kang	Aaron McGruder	August 1, 2010	315
A mysterious virus outbreak during a fried chicken promotional campaign leads to nationwide chaos, putting Huey's post-apocalypse survival plan to the test. Note: This episode references to the KFC Swine Flu scare that happened throughout the United States as well as the film Mad Max 2. Marion Ross guest-stars as Mrs. van Heusen.
44	14	"The Color Ruckus"	Young Chan Kim	Aaron McGruder	August 8, 2010	314
Uncle Ruckus's family comes to town when his grandmother comes to die and he must settle some old business with his father. Note: The episode heavily references The Color Purple and The Curious Case of Benjamin Button; Luenell, Don 'D.C.' Curry, and Star Jones guest star as Nellie Ruckus, Mister Ruckus, and Bunny Ruckus respectively.
45	15	"It's Goin' Down"	Sung Hoon Kim	Aaron McGruder	August 15, 2010	305
Retired domestic terrorist Huey is the main suspect in a terror attack near Woodcrest, so he goes on the run, pursued by a high-ranking secret agent. Note: The episode references Fox's 24. Charlie Murphy, Samuel L. Jackson, Edward Asner, John C. McGinley, and Louis Lombardi (who played Edgar Stiles on 24) guest star as Ed Wuncler III, Gin Rummy, Ed Wuncler, The White Shadow, and Dan Stuckey respectively. Rated TV-MA-V for strong graphic violence

== Home release ==
All fifteen episodes from season three were released completely uncensored on a three-disc DVD set in the United States on November 9, 2010.

The Boondocks season three
Set details	Special features
15 episodes; 3-disc set; 16:9 aspect ratio; Languages: English; English subtitles; Spanish subtitles; French subtitles	Audio commentary: "It's a Black President"; "Stinkmeaner 3: The Hateocracy"; "Mr. Medicinal"; "The Fried Chicken Flu"; Slink on the Street: Dick Ridin' Obama; Slink on the Street: Who is Your Favorite Character?; Seung Eun Kim Sketch Photo Gallery; Animatic to Screen Comparisons; An Introduction by Cedric Yarbrough and Gary Anthony Williams; Episode 302 Wrap; Episode 303 Wrap; Episode 304 Wrap; Episode 309 Wrap
Release dates	Audio commentary: "It's a Black President"; "Stinkmeaner 3: The Hateocracy"; "Mr. Medicinal"; "The Fried Chicken Flu"; Slink on the Street: Dick Ridin' Obama; Slink on the Street: Who is Your Favorite Character?; Seung Eun Kim Sketch Photo Gallery; Animatic to Screen Comparisons; An Introduction by Cedric Yarbrough and Gary Anthony Williams; Episode 302 Wrap; Episode 303 Wrap; Episode 304 Wrap; Episode 309 Wrap
Region 1	Audio commentary: "It's a Black President"; "Stinkmeaner 3: The Hateocracy"; "Mr. Medicinal"; "The Fried Chicken Flu"; Slink on the Street: Dick Ridin' Obama; Slink on the Street: Who is Your Favorite Character?; Seung Eun Kim Sketch Photo Gallery; Animatic to Screen Comparisons; An Introduction by Cedric Yarbrough and Gary Anthony Williams; Episode 302 Wrap; Episode 303 Wrap; Episode 304 Wrap; Episode 309 Wrap
November 9, 2010	Audio commentary: "It's a Black President"; "Stinkmeaner 3: The Hateocracy"; "Mr. Medicinal"; "The Fried Chicken Flu"; Slink on the Street: Dick Ridin' Obama; Slink on the Street: Who is Your Favorite Character?; Seung Eun Kim Sketch Photo Gallery; Animatic to Screen Comparisons; An Introduction by Cedric Yarbrough and Gary Anthony Williams; Episode 302 Wrap; Episode 303 Wrap; Episode 304 Wrap; Episode 309 Wrap

In addition all episodes from season three are available on iTunes.
