= Seung Eun Kim =

American artist, film director and animator

- Born: July 17, 1974 (age 52); South Korea
- Occupations: Artist, director, animator
- Years active: 1996–present
- Spouse: Joo Kim
- Children: SungMin Kim, Minzy Kim
- Website: kse332.deviantart.com

Seung-Eun Kim (Korean: 김승은; born July 17, 1974) is a South Korean artist, director, and animator. He is a two-time Emmy Award nominee, winning once in 2006, and is also a three-time Annie Award nominee. Kim has worked in animation since 1996.

== Career ==
Highlights of his career include:

- Godzilla TV series, storyboard artist/storyboard clean-up artist, main titles animator 1998-2000
- Roughnecks: Starship Troopers Chronicles TV series, storyboard artist, 1999-2000 (6 episodes)
- Max Steel TV series, storyboard artist 2000-2001 (4 episodes)
- Jackie Chan Adventures TV series, storyboard artist, main titles animator, director, 2000-2004 (12 episodes)
- Spider-Man: The New Animated Series TV series, director, 2003 (8 episodes)
- The Batman TV series, director, 2005 (1 episode), nominated for two Annie Awards and two-time and won and Emmy Award for Outstanding Special Class Animated Program in 2006.
- The Boondocks TV series, supervising director, 2005–2008

Kim has also done award-winning work in sculpture and comic book art, most notably work for the Hellboy: Weird Tales comic.

Kim directed the following episodes of The Boondocks:

- "The Story of Gangstalicious"
- "A Huey Freeman Christmas"
- "Let's Nab Oprah"
- "Wingmen"
- "...Or Die Trying"
- "Tom, Sarah and Usher"
- "Thank You for Not Snitching"
- "Stinkmeaner Strikes Back"
- "The Story of Thugnificent"
- "Attack of the Killer Kung-Fu Wolf Bitch"
- "The Story of Gangstalicious 2"
- "The Uncle Ruckus Reality Show"

Kim's work also includes a reimagining of the Sun Wukong Monkey King story called Battle Earth: Return of the Monkey King!.
