= The Boondocks season 2 =

The Boondocks
- Season 2
- DVD cover
- No. of episodes: 15

Release
- Original network: Adult Swim; Teletoon (episodes 14–15)
- Original release: October 8, 2007 – March 23, 2008

Season chronology
- ← Previous; Season 1 Next → Season 3

The second season of the animated television series, The Boondocks originally aired in the United States on Cartoon Network's late night programming block, Adult Swim. The second season features 15 episode, it originally premiered on October 8, 2007 with "...Or Die Trying" and ended with "The Story of Gangstalicious 2" on February 4, 2008.

"The Hunger Strike" and "The Uncle Ruckus Reality Show" did not initially air in the United States, for legal reasons. These episodes aired in Canada and Latin America; and were also released in the United States on DVD and iTunes. Adult Swim eventually aired both episodes in the United States, 12 years after the original broadcast of the season and six years after the ending of the series, on May 30, 2020.

All fifteen episodes from season two were released completely uncensored on a three-disc DVD set in the United States on June 10, 2008. The second season is also available on iTunes and has been made available for on demand streaming on Netflix.

== Production ==
Seung Eun Kim and Dan Fausett served as directors, and series creator Aaron McGruder, Rodney Barnes, Jason Van Veen, and Yamara Taylor served as writers for season two. All episodes in season two, with the exception of "The Hunger Strike" and "The Uncle Ruckus Reality Show", originally aired in the United States on Cartoon Network's late night programming block, Adult Swim, and are rated TV-MA for graphic violence and dangerous activity involving children, explicit language (mostly heavy use of racist, sexist, and homophobic slurs, as well as bleeped-out profanity), and infrequent instances of strong sexual content.

Season two features guest appearances from Snoop Dogg, Mo'Nique, Katt Williams, Charlie Murphy, Samuel L. Jackson, Mos Def, Marion Ross, Bill Duke, Ghostface Killah, Terry Crews, Kevin Michael Richardson, Busta Rhymes, Fatman Scoop, Sway Calloway, Xzibit, Nate Dogg, Aisha Tyler, Tichina Arnold, Cedric the Entertainer, Lil Wayne, Cee-Lo Green, Fred Willard, Tavis Smiley, and Donald Faison.

== Episodes ==
| No. overall | No. in season | Title | Directed by | Written by | Original release date | Prod. code |
|---|---|---|---|---|---|---|
| 16 | 1 | "...Or Die Trying" | Seung Eun Kim | Aaron McGruder (story); Yamara Taylor (screenplay) | October 8, 2007 | 205 |
Soul Plane 2: The Blackjacking! hits movie theaters and Robert, Riley, Huey and Jazmine sneak into the movie theater to see it--Huey has his reasons for not wanting to go to a movie with Granddad. At the theater, they do their best to avoid Ruckus, who is fervent about reporting them to the authorities while Jazmine feels guilty for sneaking into the movies; forcing Robert to persuade her to not turn them in. Snoop Dogg and Mo'Nique guest star as Captain Mack and Jamiqua respectively.
| 17 | 2 | "Tom, Sarah and Usher" | Seung Eun Kim | Aaron McGruder (story); Rodney Barnes (screenplay) | October 15, 2007 | 202 |
Sarah and Tom split after an unexpected appearance by Usher causes an infatuated Sarah to put on a girlish display at their anniversary dinner. Tom, chagrined, is cruelly kicked out of the house, even though his wife was the one who was flirting with someone else, and stays at the Freemans house. He then attempts to learn assertiveness towards his disrespectful wife from A Pimp Named Slickback. Katt Williams guest stars as A Pimp Named Slickback.
| 18 | 3 | "Thank You for Not Snitching" | Seung Eun Kim | Aaron McGruder | October 22, 2007 | 203 |
A series of home invasions executed by the outlaw war veterans Ed Wuncler III and Gin Rummy has Woodcrest in a panic and the neighborhood watch on high alert. Because of Uncle Ruckus' presence towards the Freemans, the Neighborhood Watch tries to convince the Freemans into joining the club but eventually fails. But when Riley witnesses the theft of Robert's precious car (by Ed and Gin), Riley has to decide whether to reveal their identities or uphold the "stop snitching" principle even as he and Robert are threatened with arrest. Charlie Murphy, Samuel L. Jackson, Mos Def, Bill Duke, and Marion Ross guest star as Ed Wuncler III, Gin Rummy, Gangstalicious, the detective, and Mrs. von Heusen respectively..
| 19 | 4 | "Stinkmeaner Strikes Back" | Seung Eun Kim | Aaron McGruder (story); Rodney Barnes (screenplay) | October 29, 2007 | 201 |
The spirit of Colonel H. Stinkmeaner is released from Asian-styled Hell and he possesses Tom Dubois to exact vengeance upon the Freemans for killing him as Huey is aware of his return. But Stinkmeaner is knocked out and scheduled for an exorcism. Ghostface Killah, Terry Crews and Kevin Michael Richardson guest star as himself, a man in a parking lot, and the devil/various characters respectively.
| 20 | 5 | "The Story of Thugnificent" | Seung Eun Kim | Aaron McGruder | November 5, 2007 | 204 |
When world-renowned rapper Thugnificent moves in across the street from the Freemans in early July 2007, Robert files a complaint against him after a boisterous party. In response, Thugnificent makes a diss video entitled "Eff Granddad", invoking a rivalry between the two. Snoop Dogg, Busta Rhymes, Fat Man Scoop, MTV's Sway, Xzibit, and Nate Dogg guest star as Macktastic, Flonominal, and themselves respectively.
| 21 | 6 | "Attack of the Killer Kung-Fu Wolf Bitch" | Seung Eun Kim | Aaron McGruder (story); Rodney Barnes (screenplay) | November 19, 2007 | 207 |
Robert's online-dating adventures lead him to a beautiful woman named Luna, whom he invites for the weekend. Unfortunately, Huey, Riley, and Robert soon learn that Luna is a psychotic and a kung-fu expert. Aisha Tyler and Tichina Arnold guest star as Luna and Nicole/Brenda Richie respectively.
| 22 | 7 | "Shinin'" | Dan Fausett | Aaron McGruder | November 26, 2007 | 208 |
After proving himself worthy to Thugnificent, Riley is finally initiated into Thugnificent's Lethal Interjection crew and given the crew's official chain. Unfortunately, a local bully steals the chain, so Riley tries to retrieve it. At first, he tries to fight the bully, Butch Magnus, but fails on advice from Granddad. He then tries to retrieve it on his own before the Lethal Interjection crew finds out. Busta Rhymes, Snoop Dogg, Charlie Murphy and MTV's Sway guest star as Flonominal, Macktastic, Ed Wuncler III, and himself respectively.
| 23 | 8 | "Ballin'" | Dan Fausett | Aaron McGruder (story); Jason Van Veen & André Brooks (screenplay) | December 3, 2007 | 209 |
Riley joins Tom's youth basketball team and discovers the benefits of practice and team play.
| 24 | 9 | "Invasion of the Katrinians" | Dan Fausett | Aaron McGruder (story); Rodney Barnes (screenplay) | December 10, 2007 | 212 |
Displaced by Hurricane Katrina, Jericho Freeman (Robert's cousin) and his family--extremely annoying, selfish, and lazy--move in with Robert and the boys, who soon want to get rid of them as soon as possible. Cedric the Entertainer and Lil Wayne guest star as Jericho Freeman and his son respectively.
| 25 | 10 | "Home Alone" | Dan Fausett | Aaron McGruder (story); Rodney Barnes (screenplay) | December 17, 2007 | 214 |
When Robert goes on vacation, he leaves Huey and Riley home with Uncle Ruckus as their chaperone. The boys cause enough havoc to chase Uncle Ruckus away, which leaves Huey in charge; when Riley spends all the money Granddad left them, Huey "grounds" him.
| 26 | 11 | "The S-Word" | Seung Eun Kim | Aaron McGruder (story); Rodney Barnes (screenplay) | January 21, 2008 | 213 |
After Riley is called "The N-Word" by his teacher Mr. Petto in school, Robert and the media-addicted Rev Rollo Goodlove try to capitalize on the incident. Cee-Lo Green and Fred Willard guest star as Rollo Goodlove and Mr. Petto respectively. Larry King also guest stars as himself on his talk show "Larry King Live". Note: This episode is based on an actual news story of a white teacher calling a black student "nigga."
| 27 | 12 | "The Story of Catcher Freeman" | Dan Fausett | Aaron McGruder | January 28, 2008 | 211 |
After Granddad and Uncle Ruckus tell two very different accounts of the Freeman family's Civil War-era ancestor Catcher, Huey decides to uncover the truth. Donald Faison guest stars as Tobias/Catcher Freeman.
| 28 | 13 | "The Story of Gangstalicious Part 2" | Dan Fausett | Aaron McGruder (story); Rodney Barnes (screenplay) | February 4, 2008 | 215 |
Much to Robert's chagrin, Riley starts to walk, talk, and dress like his favorite rapper, Gangstalicious. Riley arranges for rappers Thugnificent, Flo-Nominal, and Macktastic to collaborate with Gangstalicious on a remix of his new hit song, "Homies over Hoes." But Riley's world turns upside-down when rumors surface about Gangstalicious being gay--following in the footsteps of gay rappers MC Booty and Homo D. Snoop Dogg, Busta Rhymes, Mos Def, Katt Williams, Fat Man Scoop, and MTV's Sway guest star as Macktastic, Flonominal, Gangstalicious, A Pimp Named Slickback, and themselves respectively.
| 29 | 14 | "The Hunger Strike" | Dan Fausett | Aaron McGruder (story); Rodney Barnes (screenplay) | March 16, 2008 (Teletoon); June 10, 2008 (US, DVD); May 30, 2020 (Adult Swim) | 206 |
Huey goes on a hunger strike in a boycott of BET and receives high-profile support from Reverend Rollo Goodlove (whose origin is explained in this episode), but the Reverend might be more interested in self-promotion than good intentions. CeeLo Green, PBS' Tavis Smiley, and Donald Faison guest star as Rollo Goodlove, himself, and Wedgie Rudlin respectively. There were rumors that BET executives were threatening to sue if the episode was shown; a Cartoon Network representative denied this.
| 30 | 15 | "The Uncle Ruckus Reality Show" | Seung Eun Kim | Aaron McGruder (story); Rodney Barnes (screenplay) | March 23, 2008 (Teletoon); June 10, 2008 (US, DVD); May 30, 2020 (Adult Swim) | 210 |
BET decides to film Uncle Ruckus in his day-to-day activities around the city. Donald Faison guest stars as Wedgie Rudlin.

== Home release ==
All fifteen episodes from season two, including the episodes unaired in America: "The Hunger Strike" and "The Uncle Ruckus Reality Show", were released completely uncensored on a three-disc DVD set in the United States on June 10, 2008.

The Boondocks season two
| Set details | Special features |
| 15 episodes; 3-disc set; 16:9 aspect ratio; Languages: English; English subtitles; Spanish subtitles; French subtitles | Audio Commentaries; Video Introductions; Intro to "The Hunger Strike"; Working on the Boondocks; Gary vs. Cedric; The Playas: Character Profiles |
| Release dates | Audio Commentaries; Video Introductions; Intro to "The Hunger Strike"; Working on the Boondocks; Gary vs. Cedric; The Playas: Character Profiles |
| Region 1 | Audio Commentaries; Video Introductions; Intro to "The Hunger Strike"; Working on the Boondocks; Gary vs. Cedric; The Playas: Character Profiles |
| June 10, 2008 | Audio Commentaries; Video Introductions; Intro to "The Hunger Strike"; Working on the Boondocks; Gary vs. Cedric; The Playas: Character Profiles |

In addition all episodes from season two are available on iTunes.
