= Eisner Award for Best Limited Series =

American comic book award

- Awarded for: Best Limited Series
- Country: United States
- Formerly called: Eisner Award for Best Finite Series
- First award: 1988
- Most recent winner: Absolute Martian Manhunter, by Deniz Camp and Javier Rodriguez
- Website: www.comic-con.org/awards/eisner-awards/

The Eisner Award for Best Limited Series is an award for "creative achievement" in American comic books. It has been given out every year since 1988, with the exceptions of 1990 when no Eisner Awards were given out and 2013.

A title must have had at least half of its issues published in the previous year to eligible for the award.

== Winners and nominees ==
Year	Title	Creators	Publisher	Ref.
1980s
1988	Watchmen	Alan Moore and Dave Gibbons	DC	
1988	Elektra: Assassin	Frank Miller and Bill Sienkiewicz	Marvel	
1988	Green Arrow: The Longbow Hunters	Mike Grell	DC	
1988	Jonny Quest Classics	Doug Wildey	Comico	
1988	Kafka	Steven Seagle and Stefano Gaudiano	Renegade	
1988	Valkyrie	Chuck Dixon, Paul Gulacy and Willie Blyberg	Eclipse	
1989	Silver Surfer	Stan Lee and Jean "Moebius" Giraud	Marvel	
1989	Jezebel Jade	William Messner-Loebs and Adam Kubert	Comico	
1989	Scarlet in Gaslight	Powell and Makinen	Eternity	
1990s
1990	There was no Eisner Award ceremony, or awards distributed, in 1990, due to widespread balloting mix-ups.			
1991	Give Me Liberty	Frank Miller and Dave Gibbons	Dark Horse	
1991	The Hobbit	Chuck Dixon and David Wenzel	Eclipse	
1991	The Last American		Marvel/Epic	
1991	The Magic Flute	P. Craig Russell	Eclipse	
1991	Tapping the Vein	Clive Barker and various artists	Eclipse	
1992	Concrete: Fragile Creature	Paul Chadwick	Dark Horse	
1992	Billi 99	Sarah Byam and Tim Sale	Dark Horse	
1992	Books of Magic	Neil Gaiman and various artists	DC	
1992	Brat Pack	Rick Veitch	King Hell/Tundra	
1992	David Chelsea In Love	David Chelsea	Eclipse	
1993	Grendel: War Child	Matt Wagner and Patrick McEown	Dark Horse	
1993	Cages	Dave McKean	Tundra	
1993	Cereal Killings	James Sturm	Fantagraphics	
1993	Deadface: Earth, Water, Air, and Fire	Eddie Campbell	Dark Horse	
1993	Madman	Michael D. Allred	Tundra	
1993	The Maximortal	Rick Veitch	King Hell/Tundra	
1994	Marvels	Kurt Busiek and Alex Ross	Marvel	
1994	Daredevil: The Man without Fear	Frank Miller and John Romita, Jr.	Marvel	
1994	Death: The High Cost of Living	Neil Gaiman and Chris Bachalo	DC/Vertigo	
1994	The Golden Age	James Robinson and Paul Smith	DC	
1994	Jonah Hex: Two-Gun Mojo	Joe R. Lansdale and Timothy Truman	DC/Vertigo	
1995	Sin City: A Dame to Kill For	Frank Miller	Dark Horse/Legend	
1995	Concrete: Killer Smile	Paul Chadwick	Dark Horse/Legend	
1995	The Tale of One Bad Rat	Bryan Talbot	Dark Horse	
1995	Witchcraft	James Robinson, Teddy Kristiansen, Peter Snejberg, Steve Yeowell, and Michael Zulli	DC/Vertigo	
1996	Sin City: The Big Fat Kill	Frank Miller	Dark Horse/Legend	
1996	Chiaroscuro: The Private Lives of Leonardo da Vinci,	Dave Rawson, Pat McGreal, Chas Truog and Rafael Kayanan	DC/Vertigo	
1996	Father & Son	Jeff Nicholson	Kitchen Sink	
1996	Nexus: The Wages of Sin	Mike Baron and Steve Rude	Dark Horse	
1997	Kingdom Come	Mark Waid and Alex Ross	DC	
1997	Age of Reptiles: The Hunt	Ricardo Delgado	Dark Horse	
1997	Batman: Black and White	Mark Chiarello and Scott Peterson, eds.	DC	
1997	Death: The Time of Your Life	Neil Gaiman, Chris Bachalo, Mark Buckingham, and Mark Pennington	DC/Vertigo	
1997	Gon	Masashi Tanaka	Paradox Press	
1997	The System	Peter Kuper	DC/Vertigo Verite	
1997	Terminal City	Dean Motter and Michael Lark	DC/Vertigo	
1998	Batman: The Long Halloween	Jeph Loeb and Tim Sale	DC	
1998	Destiny: A Chronicle of Deaths Foretold	Alisa Kwitney, Kent Williams, Michael Zulli, Scott Hampton, and Rebecca Guay	DC/Vertigo	
1998	The Land of Nod	Jay Stephens	Dark Horse	
1998	Red Rocket 7	Mike Allred	Dark Horse	
1998	Terminal City: Aerial Graffiti	Dean Motter and Michael Lark	DC/Vertigo	
1998	Uncle Sam	Steve Darnall and Alex Ross	DC/Vertigo	
1999	300	Frank Miller and Lynn Varley	Dark Horse	
1999	Grendel: Black, White & Red	Matt Wagner and various artists	Dark Horse	
1999	Justice League of America: The Nail	Alan Davis and Mark Farmer	DC	
1999	Superman for All Seasons	Jeph Loeb and Tim Sale	DC	
1999	Whiteout	Greg Rucka and Steve Lieber	Oni Press	
2000s
2000	Whiteout: Melt	Greg Rucka and Steve Lieber	Oni	
2000	Clan Apis	Jay Hosler	Active Synapse	
2000	Heart of Empire	Bryan Talbot	Dark Horse	
2000	Heavy Liquid	Paul Pope	DC/Vertigo	
2000	Scene of the Crime	Ed Brubaker, Michael Lark, and Sean Phillips	DC/Vertigo	
2001	The Ring of the Nibelung	P. Craig Russell with Patrick Mason Dark	Dark Horse/Maverick	
2001	Blue Monday: The Kids Are Alright	Chynna Clugston-Major	Oni	
2001	Breakfast After Noon	Andi Watson	Oni	
2001	Fortune & Glory	Brian Michael Bendis	Oni	
2001	Sock Monkey, vol. 3	Tony Millionaire	Dark Horse/Maverick	
2002	Hellboy: Conqueror Worm	Mike Mignola	Dark Horse/Maverick	
2002	Enemy Ace: War in Heaven	Garth Ennis, Chris Weston, Christian Alamy, and Russ Heath	DC	
2002	Hopeless Savages	Jen Van Meter, Christine Norrie, and Chynna Clugston-Major	Oni	
2002	Rose	Jeff Smith and Charles Vess	Cartoon Books	
2002	Scary Godmother: Ghouls Out for Summer	Jill Thompson	Sirius	
2003	League of Extraordinary Gentleman, vol. 2	Alan Moore and Kevin O'Neill	ABC	
2003	Courtney Crumrin & the Night Things	Ted Naifeh	Oni	
2003	Hellboy: Third Wish	Mike Mignola	Dark Horse	
2004	Unstable Molecules	James Sturm and Guy Davis	Marvel	
2004	Arrowsmith	Kurt Busiek, Carlos Pacheco, and Jesús Meriño	WildStorm/DC	
2004	Empire	Mark Waid, Barry Kitson, and James Pascoe	DC	
2004	Global Frequency	Warren Ellis and various artists	WildStorm/DC	
2004	JSA: The Unholy Three	Dan Jolley, Tony Harris, and Ray Snyder	DC	
2004	Superman: Red Son	Mark Millar, Dave Johnson/Andrew Robinson, and Kilian Plunkett/Walden Wong	DC	
2005	DC: The New Frontier	Darwyn Cooke	DC	
2005	Demo	Brian Wood and Becky Cloonan	AiT/Planet Lar	
2005	30 Days of Night: Return to Barrow	Steve Niles and Ben Templesmith	IDW	
2005	WE3	Grant Morrison and Frank Quitely	Vertigo/DC	
2005	Wanted	Mark Millar and J. G. Jones	Top Cow/Image	
2006	Seven Soldiers	Grant Morrison and various artists	DC	
2006	Nat Turner	Kyle Baker	Kyle Baker Publishing	
2006	Ocean	Warren Ellis, Chris Sprouse, and Karl Story	WildStorm/DC	
2006	Smoke	Alex de Campi and Igor Kordey	IDW	
2007	Batman: Year 100	Paul Pope	DC	
2007	The Looking Glass Wars: Hatter M	Frank Beddor, Liz Cavalier, and Ben Templesmith	Desperado/Image	
2007	The Other Side	Jason Aaron and Cameron Stewart	Vertigo/DC	
2007	Scarlet Traces: The Great Game	Ian Edginton and D'Israeli	Dark Horse	
2007	Sock Monkey: The Inches Incident	Tony Millionaire	Dark Horse	
2008	The Umbrella Academy	Gerard Way and Gabriel Ba	Dark Horse	
2008	Atomic Robo	Brian Clevinger and Scott Wegender	Red 5 Comics	
2008	Dark Tower: The Gunslinger Born	Peter David, Robin Furth, and Jae Lee	Marvel	
2008	Nightly News	Jonathan Hickman	Image	
2008	Parade (with Fireworks)	Michael Cavallaro	Shadowline/Image	
2009	Hellboy: The Crooked Man	Mike Mignola and Richard Corben	Dark Horse	
2009	Groo: Hell on Earth	Sergio Aragonés and Mark Evanier	Dark Horse	
2009	Locke & Key	Joe Hill and Gabriel Rodriguez	IDW	
2009	Omega the Unknown	Jonathan Lethem, Karl Rusnak, and Farel Dalrymple	Marvel	
2009	The Twelve	Michael Straczynski and Chris Weston	Marvel	
2010s
2010	The Wonderful Wizard of Oz	Eric Shanower and Skottie Young	Marvel	
2010	Blackest Night	Geoff Johns, Ivan Reis, and Oclair Albert	DC	
2010	Incognito	Ed Brubaker and Sean Phillips	Marvel Icon	
2010	Pluto: Urasawa X Tezuka	Naoki Urasawa and Takashi Nagasaki	VIZ Media	
2010	Wolverine #66–72 and Wolverine Giant-Size Special: “Old Man Logan”	Mark Millar, Steve McNiven, and Dexter Vines	Marvel	
2011	Daytripper	Fábio Moon and Gabriel Bá	Vertigo/DC	
2011	Baltimore: The Plague Ships	Mike Mignola, Christopher Golden, and Ben Stenbeck	Dark Horse	
2011	Cinderella: From Fabletown with Love	Chris Roberson and Shawn McManus	Vertigo/DC	
2011	Joe the Barbarian	Grant Morrison and Sean Murphy	Vertigo/DC	
2011	Stumptown	Greg Rucka and Matthew Southworth	Oni	
2012	Criminal: The Last of the Innocent	Ed Brubaker and Sean Phillips	Marvel Icon	
2012	Atomic Robo and the Ghost of Station X	Brian Clevinger and Scott Wegener	Red 5	
2012	Flashpoint: Batman - Knight of Vengeance	Brian Azzarello and Eduardo Risso	Vertigo/DC	
2012	The New York Five	Brian Wood and Ryan Kelly	Vertigo/DC	
2012	Who Is Jake Ellis?	Nathan Edmondson and Tonci Zonjic	Image	
2013	The Best Limited Series category was not given this year			
2014	The Wake	Scott Synder and Sean Murphy	Vertigo/DC	
2014	The Black Beetle: No Way Out	Francesco Francavilla	Dark Horse	
2014	Colder	Paul Tobin and Juan Ferreyra	Dark Horse	
2014	47 Ronin	Mike Richardson and Stan Sakai	Dark Horse	
2014	Trillium	Jeff Lemire	Vertigo/DC	
2015	Little Nemo: Return to Slumberland	Eric Shanower and Gabriel Rodriguez	IDW	
2015	Daredevil: Road Warrior	Mark Waid and Peter Krause	Marvel Infinite Comics	
2015	The Multiversity	Grant Morrison et al.	DC	
2015	The Private Eye	Brian K. Vaughan and Marcos Martin	Panel Syndicate	
2015	The Sandman: Overture	Neil Gaiman and J. H. Williams III	Vertigo/DC	
2016	The Fade Out	Ed Brubaker and Sean Phillips	Image	
2016	Chrononauts	Mark Millar and Sean Murphy	Image	
2016	Lady Killer	Joëlle Jones and Jamie S. Rich	Dark Horse	
2016	Minimum Wage: So Many Bad Decisions	Bob Fingerman	Image	
2016	The Spire	Simon Spurrier and Jeff Stokely	BOOM! Studios	
2017	The Vision	Tom King and Gabriel Walta	Marvel	
2017	Archangel	William Gibson, Michael St. John Smith, Butch Guice, and Tom Palmer	IDW	
2017	Briggs Land	Brian Wood and Mack Chater	Dark Horse	
2017	Han Solo	Marjorie Liu and Mark Brooks	Marvel	
2017	Kim and Kim	Magdalene Visaggio and Eva Cabrera	Black Mask	
2017	We Stand on Guard	Brian K. Vaughan and Steve Skroce	Image	
2018	Black Panther: World of Wakanda	Roxane Gay, Ta-Nehisi Coates, and Alitha E. Martinez	Marvel	
2018	Extremity	Daniel Warren Johnson	Image/Skybound	
2018	The Flintstones	Mark Russell, Steve Pugh, Rick Leonardi, and Scott Hanna	DC	
2018	Mister Miracle	Tom King and Mitch Gerads	DC	
2018	X-Men: Grand Design, by Ed Piskor	Ed Piskor	Marvel	
2019	Mister Miracle	Tom King and Mitch Gerads	DC	
2019	Batman: White Knight	Sean Murphy	DC	
2019	Eternity Girl	Magdalene Visaggio and Sonny Liew	Vertigo/DC	
2019	Exit Stage Left: The Snagglepuss Chronicles	Mark Russell, Mike Feehan, and Mark Morales	DC	
2019	X-Men: Grand Design: Second Genesis	Ed Piskor	Marvel	
2020s
2020	Little Bird	Darcy Van Poelgeest and Ian Bertram	Image	
2020	Ascender	Jeff Lemire and Dustin Nguyen	Image	
2020	Ghost Tree	Bobby Curnow and Simon Gane	IDW	
2020	Naomi	Brian Michael Bendis, David Walker, and Jamal Campbell	DC	
2020	Sentient	Jeff Lemire and Gabriel Walta	TKO	
2021	Superman’s Pal Jimmy Olsen	Matt Fraction and Steve Lieber	DC	
2021	Barbalien: Red Planet	Jeff Lemire, Tate Brombal, and Gabriel Hernandez Walta	Dark Horse	
2021	Decorum	Jonathan Hickman and Mike Huddleston	Image	
2021	Far Sector	N. K. Jemisin and Jamal Campbell	DC	
2021	Strange Adventures	Tom King, Mitch Gerads, and Evan “Doc” Shaner	DC Black Label	
2021	We Live	Inaki Miranda and Roy Miranda	AfterShock	
2022	The Good Asian	Pornsak Pichetshote and Alexandre Tefenkgi	Image	
2022	Beta Ray Bill: Argent Star	Daniel Warren Johnson	Marvel	
2022	Hocus Pocus	Rik Worth and Jordan Collver	hocuspocuscomic.squarespace.com	
2022	The Many Deaths of Laila Starr	Ram V and Filipe Andrade	BOOM! Studios	
2022	Stray Dogs	Tony Fleecs and Trish Forstner	Image	
	Supergirl: Woman of Tomorrow	Tom King and Bilquis Evely	DC	
2023	The Human Target	Tom King and Greg Smallwood	DC	
2023	Animal Castle	Xavier Dorison and Felix Delep	Ablaze	
2023	Batman: One Bad Day	Dave Wielgosz and Jessica Berbey (ed.)	DC	
2023	Miracleman by Gaiman & Buckingham: The Silver Age	Neil Gaiman and Mark Buckingham	Marvel	
2023	Superman: Space Age	Mark Russell, Michael Allred, and Laura Allred	DC	
2024	PeePee PooPoo	Caroline Cash	Silver Sprocket	
2024	The Cull	Kelly Thompson and Mattia De Iulis	Image	
2024	Godzilla: Here There Be Dragons	Frank Tieri and Inaki Miranda	IDW	
2024	Kill Your Darlings	Ethan S. Parker, Griffin Sheridan, and Robert Quinn	Image	
2024	Superman: Lost	Christopher Priest and Carlo Pagulayan	DC	
2025	Zatanna: Bring Down the House	Mariko Tamaki and Javier Rodríguez	DC	
2025	Alan Scott: The Green Lantern	Tim Sheridan and Cian Tormey	DC	
2025	Animal Pound	Tom King and Peter Gross	BOOM! Studios	
2025	The Deviant	James Tynion IV and Joshua Hixson	Image	
2025	Helen of Wyndhorn	Tom King and Bilquis Evely	Dark Horse	
2025	Rare Flavours	Ram V and Filipe Andrade	BOOM! Studios	
2026	Absolute Martian Manhunter	Deniz Camp and Javier Rodríguez	DC	
2026	Beneath the Trees Where Nobody Sees: Rite of Spring	Patrick Horvath	IDW	
2026	Bronze Faces	Shobo, Shof, and Alexandre Tefenkgi	BOOM! Studios	
2026	Crownsville	Rodney Barnes and Elia Bonetti	Oni Press	
2026	Everything Dead and Dying	Tate Brombal and Jacob Phillips	Image	
2026	Out of Alcatraz	Christopher Cantwell and Tyler Crook	Oni Press	
