= The Hunger Strike =

- The Boondocks episode
- Leevil (right) and Rudlin (center) during a BET morning board meeting
- Episode no.: Season 2 Episode 14
- Directed by: Dan Fausett
- Written by: Aaron McGruder; Rodney Barnes
- Production code: 206
- Original air dates: March 16, 2008 (Teletoon); June 10, 2008 (United States, DVD); May 30, 2020 (Adult Swim)

Guest appearances
- CeeLo Green as Rollo Goodlove; Donald Faison as Wedgie Rudlin; Debra Wilson Skelton as Debra Leevil; Tavis Smiley as himself

Episode chronology
| ← Previous "The Story of Gangstalicious 2" | Next → "The Uncle Ruckus Reality Show" |
- The Boondocks (season 2)

"The Hunger Strike" is the fourteenth episode of the second season of the American animated television series The Boondocks, and the 29th episode overall. It was written by series creator Aaron McGruder, along with Rodney Barnes, and directed by Dan Fausett. The episode was set to premiere on Adult Swim on January 7, 2008, between "The Story of Thugnificent" and "Attack of the Killer Kung-Fu Wolf Bitch", but aired in the United States on May 30, 2020.

In Canada, the episode aired on March 16, 2008, on the network Teletoon at Night, with a disclaimer stating that "the views in this program do not reflect that of Teletoon Canada or its parent companies". The episode aired globally, and appeared on Netflix streaming in Canada, as well as on HBO Max in the United States shortly before its TV premiere. According to Aaron McGruder on an introduction video for the episode found on the DVD set, this episode was originally set to be titled "BET Sucks".

== Plot ==
At the headquarters of BET, fictional president Debra Leevil, a parody of BET Holdings CEO Debra L. Lee with a personality resembling Dr. Evil from the Austin Powers films, presides over a board meeting to discuss the network's strategy for destroying black people. The issue of Huey Freeman is brought up. He is shown on CNN giving a press conference stating that he is on a hunger strike and that he will not eat until there is a public apology for creating BET, the network is shut down, and all the executive board members commit seppuku.

Huey joins forces with the charismatic Rev. Rollo Goodlove, voiced by rapper/singer Cee-Lo, who adds a flashy image to the fight against BET, by lobbying for a boycott of the network. Huey initially believes this to be a good idea, as a concert organized by Goodlove, and featuring his band, draws widespread attention and sparks a widespread boycott. However, Huey gradually discovers that Goodlove is primarily interested in drawing media attention to himself, through shameless merchandising, self-promotion, and outrageous behavior. Goodlove justifies his tactics by explaining that in order to reach the black community, he has to present its members with something they can relate to.

Leevil and the BET board eventually see a news broadcast in which Uncle Ruckus expresses his support of BET and its ability to ruin the minds of young black people. Taking inspiration from his words, they offer Goodlove a sitcom on the network. He accepts, betraying Huey and causing the boycott to fall apart. Dejected, Huey ends his hunger strike and asks his grandfather Robert, "What do you do when you can't do nothing, but there's nothing you can do?" Robert replies, "You do what you can."

== Airing and BET ==
There have been rumors that this and a second episode, "The Uncle Ruckus Reality Show", were initially banned from airing in the United States due to threatened litigation from BET. The episodes are said to specifically attack Reggie Hudlin, BET's president of entertainment from 2005 to 2008, and Debra L. Lee, president and chief executive officer of BET Holdings, the parent company of BET.

Lee is portrayed as Deborah Leevil, a parody of the character Dr. Evil from the Austin Powers movies, and Hudlin is portrayed as Wedgie Rudlin, a "culturally insensitive buffoon coasting on his Ivy League education." However, a Cartoon Network representative stated that BET had not contacted Cartoon Network regarding the episodes. Sony Pictures Television, which produces the series, has not issued a statement on the matter.

Ironically, Hudlin was credited as an executive producer for the first two seasons of The Boondocks, though this was only a contractual obligation. Hudlin had no involvement with the show since the first pilot was rejected by Fox. During the episode, the character Deborah Leevil relates the mission of BET within The Boondocks universe, stating:

Our leader Bob Johnson had a dream, a dream creating a network that would accomplish what hundreds of years of slavery, Jim Crow and malt liquor couldn't – the destruction of black people!

On the DVD release of the second season, McGruder states, "I was looking for changes and improvements, and I didn't see any", referring to BET's programming. He decided to show his frustration using satire in The Boondocks, reasoning "I didn't see them. So I said, OK, it's fair game."
