= Crownsville (comic) =

2025 comic series by Rodney Barnes and Elia Bonetti

Publication information
- Publisher: Oni Press
- Genre: Horror
- Publication date: 2025
- No. of issues: 5

Creative team
- Written by: Rodney Barnes
- Artist: Elia Bonetti

Crownsville is a five-issue horror comic book miniseries written by Rodney Barnes and illustrated by Elia Bonetti. It follows three strangers brought together by a mysterious death at the modern-day shuttered Crownsville State Hospital. The series won the Dwayne McDuffie Award for Diversity in Comics and was nominated for the Eisner Award for Best Limited Series.

== Plot ==
Taking place in the modern day, the story involves the death of a guard at the closed Crownsville State Hospital that gets labelled a suicide. Three men are brought together by the death; Todd Hicks, a security guard that had recently started working at the former hospital and a co-worker of the deceased; Paul Blair, a reporter and the son of one of the hospital's nurse; and Mike Simms, a detective hunting down a trail of homicides.

== Background ==
Barnes' grandmother worked as a nurse at the real-life Crownsville State Hospital, and additionally had family member who were inducted into the hospital.

== Reception ==
Reviews for the first issue were positive. Collier Jennings of AIPT Comics praised the art, especially the horror imagery in the first issue's back half and the distinctive appearances of the three main characters.

Awards and nomination
Year	Award/Honor	Result	Ref.
2026	Dwayne McDuffie Award for Diversity in Comics	Won	
2026	Eisner Award for Best Limited Series	Nominated	
