= Crownsville Hospital Center =

Former psychiatric hospital located in Crownsville, Maryland, US

- Maryland Department of Mental Health and Hygiene
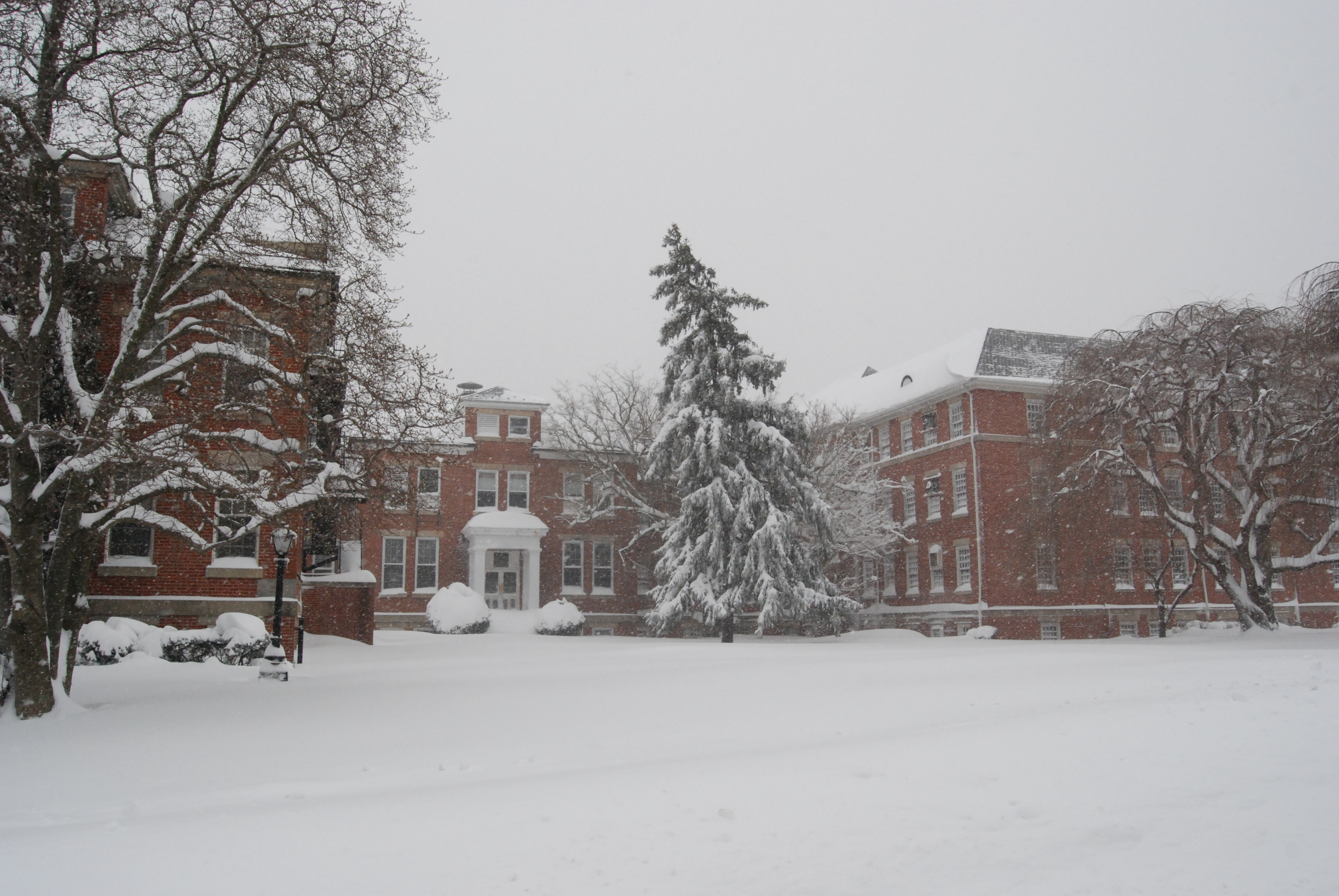

Geography
- Location: Crownsville, Maryland, United States
- Coordinates: 39°1′26″N 76°36′2″W

Organization
- Care system: State-run institution

Services
- Emergency department: No
- Beds: 264

History
- Founded: 1911
- Closed: 2004

Links
- Lists: Hospitals in Maryland

The Crownsville Hospital Center was a psychiatric hospital located in Crownsville, Maryland. It was in operation from 1911 until 2004.

== History ==
=== Background ===
Crownsville Hospital Center was enabled by an act of the Maryland General Assembly on April 11, 1910 as the Hospital for the Negro Insane of Maryland. This act also explicitly specified that the facility should not be located in Baltimore. On December 13, 1910, the Board of Managers purchased land which had formerly been farmed for willow and tobacco, located at Crownsville, Maryland, for the sum of $19,000. On May 23, 1910, Dr. Dan Hempeck was designated the first Superintendent.

The facility was founded following a 1908 report of "The Maryland State Lunacy Commission" which stated:

It is with a feeling of shame and humiliation that the conditions which exist in the State among the negro insane are chronicled and known to the public. Righteous indignation cannot help being aroused when one sees or reads of the most horrible cruelties being practiced upon these unfortunates.... The most urgent need at this time is a hospital for the negro insane of Maryland....

As early as 1899, the Maryland Lunacy Commission stated in its Annual Report:

At present there are no negro insane at the second hospital (Springfield) and the comparatively small number at Spring Grove is a distinct embarrassment to the institution.

Again in its 1900 report it stated:

The condition of the negro insane at Montevue Hospital at Frederick is shameful and should at once be remedied. The beasts of the field are better cared for than the poor negroes at Montevue.

In 1888, an article titled "The Need of An Asylum or Hospital for the Separate Care and Treatment of the Colored Insane of This State" stated three reasons for creating the hospital. However, five years later, about four hundred black people were still improperly cared for in dark cells, restrained with chains, and sleeping on straw (Bowlin, Lauren).

In chapter 250 of the Laws of Maryland of 1910, an attempt was made to improve the conditions under which the black mentally ill had to live in Maryland (Bowlin, Lauren).

The first group of 12 patients arrived at Crownsville on March 13, 1911. Patients lived in a work camp located in a willow curing house adjacent to one of the willow ponds. Winterode worked with them to prepare roads and to harvest the tobacco and willow crops on the property. Additional patients were transferred in July and September, 1911. Construction started on the first large building, A Building in October 1912. Patients were used to work on the construction of the hospital in addition to working in its day-to-day functions. Men were given manual labored work and women had to knit and mend clothing for staff as well as patients (Osborn, Lawrence). As reported in the State Lunacy Commission Report of December 1912, patients worked as "hod carriers" and assistants to electricians and plumbers. Construction necessitated that they push "barrows of concrete up a tramway three and a half stories in height." They excavated "10,000 cubic yards of earth in about 10 weeks." In addition, they unloaded 238 cars of cement, stone, and other building materials. "The laundry work for the patients is done by two adult males and an epileptic imbecile 10 years of age who has been taught to feed the ringer [sic] and at which he has become quite adept. During the past year (1912) these three have washed and ironed over 40,000 pieces."

=== Need for separate care ===
Within a short time smallpox and scarlet fever struck the patients. Water quality was also cited as a problem in those early years. Tuberculosis was a constant threat and is mentioned in the annual reports of those early years because there was no real provision for the isolation of the patients, except in the summer months when there was a temporary open building for them. The Annual and Biennial Report of the State Lunacy Commission 1914–1915, in the section on Crownsville Hospital, stated that "the percentage of deaths based upon admissions (268 patients) was 38.43. The percentage of deaths calculated upon admissions due to tuberculosis was 29.85. The percentage of deaths based upon average attendance was 32.21." Tuberculosis remained a problem for many years.

It was not until 1939 that the Commissioner of Mental Hygiene announced:

"The opening at Springfield State Hospital of a separate building for the care of mental patients suffering from tuberculosis is one of the outstanding achievements of 1939. In this building all patients from Spring Grove, Springfield and Eastern Shore State Hospital who are suffering from tuberculosis and who represent a danger to other patients or who need special treatment will be cared for.

Excluded from this new, active treatment program at the all-white Springfield Hospital Center were the African-American Crownsville TB patients. On October 29, 1915, two hundred Baltimore City patients were transferred from Bayview Medical Center (now Johns Hopkins Bayview Medical Center).

=== Understaffed, overcrowded ===
There were two physicians in 1920, including the superintendent, with a patient census of 521. There were also 17 nurses and attendants, one social worker, and 18 other help. The data from the 1920 U.S. Census report has the average age of Crownsville patients at 42 years. The youngest was 14 years and there were three patients in their eighties. In the occupations' section of the report, 68% were listed as holding hospital job assignments. Therapies initially included hydrotherapy and sedatives. In the 1930s, insulin shock was introduced. Malaria treatment was begun in 1942, in which patients were infected with malaria pathogens. As many as twenty patients at a time were inoculated. According to the 1948 Annual Report, Crownsville had about 1,800 patients, of which 103 patients received shock treatments, 56 patients received malaria/penicillin treatments, and 33 received a lobotomy.

Lobotomies were a common procedure during those years, but Crownsville Superintendent Dr. Morgenstern was opposed to them. In his 1950 Annual Report, he said that Crownsville has "very few lobotomies". He also expressed his opposition to the trend "to rely upon this operation to make the institutional case more manageable". In a report of March 1954, the Superintendent stated that lobotomies were not being done.

According to a January 1947 report on medical care in Maryland, the normal occupancy of private and public mental hospital beds was 7,453. Of these, only Crownsville had African American patients in its 1,044 occupied beds as of August 1946. Hospital conditions deteriorated markedly in the 1940s due to overcrowding and staff shortages. The staffing of the wards was very inadequate during the period of World War II. Financial support hurt asylums because most were philanthropies, but costs to operate them were high (Osborn, Lawrence). The Commissioner of Mental Hygiene said in a letter of May 22, 1945 to the State's Governor: "A few nights ago at Crownsville in the division which houses ninety criminal, insane men there was one employee on duty."

A "Confidential Report to the Board of Mental Hygiene in Regard to Present Conditions in State Hospitals" (November 14, 1944) stated that Crownsville was 30-percent over its capacity, in contrast to the two large hospitals for white patients which were 11.6-percent and 11-percent over capacity. That same report documented that, for the preceding five-year period, the average number of deaths per 1,000 patients was 102 at Crownsville, in contrast to 59 and 60 for the two large hospitals serving white patients. The report also mentioned a problem relating to the availability of clothes for the "feebleminded" patients of Crownsville: "Some serious problems relating to supplies have occurred so that on one recent occasion some 25 patients in the Division for the "Feebleminded" were found on inspection to be completely without clothes."

=== Deteriorating conditions ===
A visitor to the Division for the Feebleminded at Crownsville described his experiences in a memo of November 2, 1944 to the Commissioner of Mental Hygiene (Dr. Preston). After praising the appearance of the girls' ward, he described the boys' ward as follows:

The boys side was very dirty, the boys themselves, the dormitories and dayroom. Sitting at dinner were twenty seven boys completely nude, most of them spilling food all over themselves. There was on that day only one attendant on the boys' side who was definitely working hard.

The Baltimore Sun's articles on Maryland's mental health system were published in 1948–1949 under the title "MARYLAND'S SHAME". Following are statements from the articles relating to Crownsville:

More than 1800 men, women and children are herded into its buildings meant for not more than 1,100. Crownsville is also the dumping ground for feeble minded negro children and epileptics. The children's buildings are among the most crowded in the institution. One hundred and fifteen girls spend most of their days in a single, long bare play room with virtually nothing to play with. There are so few attendants that the older girls have to carry the helpless ones bodily to and from meals. Not one of the more than 200 boys and girls at Crownsville is getting any formal schooling at all. Some of the epileptics lie all day on the bare floor.

In 1929 there were 55 discharges from Crownsville but 92 deaths. The census began to rise dramatically, until it peaked in 1955 at 2,719 patients. The staff of Crownsville Hospital had been all white until 1948.

=== Integration ===
Through the 1940s, the NAACP had advocated hiring African-American staff but encountered resistance from the Commissioner of Mental Hygiene. Finally, in 1948, the new superintendent of Crownsville hired the first African-American staff member Vernon Sparks, in the Psychology Department. Gwendolyn Lee was hired later in the Social Work Department. The Crownsville Superintendent still was not permitted to hire African-American staff in direct-care positions. This did not happen until 1952. By 1959, 45-percent of Crownsville's staff was African-American, in contrast to 6- to 8-percent in the other large state mental hospitals.

The adolescent patient population was integrated in 1962 and the adult population in 1963. An earlier integration attempt had been made in December 1954 when the Crownsville Superintendent transferred 15 children ages 2–6 years from Crownsville to the all-white Rosewood State Training School. The Superintendent of Crownsville was threatened with a reprimand by the Commissioner of Mental Health and resigned the next year (1955).

=== Unpaid labor ===
Industrial therapy (unpaid work) was an important part of life at Crownsville. In the spring of 1958, more than 600 patients had work assignments in more than 55 placements, which included "dental assistant," "receptionist," "librarian," and "hospital aide." Work was considered to be part of therapy, and "patients unable or unwilling to participate were considered too ill to enjoy the privilege of freedom of the grounds." Staff shortages were always a problem.

In 1953, Superintendent Dr. Eichert reported that in "A" Building there were 560 patients and four attendants in the evening and four in the day. The Baltimore Sun of June 1953 gives a description of the "old ward for highly disturbed women": "Here are truly the creatures of the dark. The sickest ones are kept in a room as forbidding as a dungeon, where they live in a state of odorous untidiness, many of them refusing to wear clothes. Twice a day a bucket and two cups are brought to the door, to give the inmates a drink. There are 78 patients here and 28 beds. These and other patients on the same floor – a total of 96 – have the use of three toilets, three wash basins and one tub. They cannot be bathed daily because it was explained, hot water is not available every day."

The Baltimore City Grand Jury Report for Fall 1955 reported that "This committee was shocked at the lack of professional personnel at Crownsville. On one ward, which consists of 76 geriatric patients, there is either one registered nurse or an attendant on duty at a time. Many of these patients must be spoon fed... The Patients who are well enough help feed those who are less fortunate than themselves." In the pediatrics section of the Winterode Building for the feebleminded, there are 38 children including spastics, hydrocephalics and microcephalics. These children require expert nursing care but on our visit to this section there was one registered nurse on duty. It is necessary to have several female patients assist in the care of these children."

In a letter to the Maryland Governor of June 23, 1952, the Chairman of the Mental Hygiene Board of Review asked:

Why is less being done relatively to relieve the distressing overcrowding at Crownsville than at any of the other institutions or why this institution is allowed a patient per capita cost of $1085; an amount less than any of the other hospitals; fifty percent less than two of them...?

In a letter to a Johns Hopkins Hospital social worker of December 3, 1956, Dr. Ralph Meng, the Crownsville Superintendent, expressed his concern that community agencies were not willing to accept their responsibilities in providing services to discharged Crownsville patients. He said:

Just as a guess, I would think that about 40% of our patients could be handled without hospitalization if anybody made an effort to do so.

Elsie Lacks (born Lucille Elsie Pleasant) was the second-born and eldest daughter of Henrietta Lacks, who was the source of the famous HeLa cell line. Elsie was institutionalized here for epilepsy until she died in 1955 at the age of 15.

=== First black superintendent ===
In 1964, Dr. George McKenzie Phillips was appointed, the first African-American superintendent. Dr. Phillips established a day treatment program and a school mental health outreach program, in addition to supporting the mental health clinics in Baltimore and the Southern Maryland Counties. Patients in Crownsville clinics were given free medication. Training programs were established in psychiatry, psychology, social work, dance therapy, and pastoral counseling. Crownsville had an active foreign students' program for those in medicine, social work, and psychology. In the ten years prior to its closing, it hosted students from Israel, Ireland, Spain, Germany, Turkey, and Chile. The Hospital also trained Spanish speaking therapists when that need was identified.

The hospital staff was well known for its outspoken resistance to the pressures to place patients in public shelters, with the resulting "dumping" of patients onto the streets and into the jails. Improvements in psychiatric treatment, rigid admission policies, and better funding of outpatient treatment and residential services resulted in the hospital's census declining from 2,719 in 1955 to 200 patients by the year 2000 and zero soon after.

The hospital grounds became the central county site for many social, school, and health programs, and the hospital finally closed in July 2004. Those patients in need of further psychiatric hospitalization were transferred to two of Maryland's remaining hospitals. Its original buildings are still standing and today portions of the campus are occupied by various tenants.

The site is also the location of Crownsville Hospital's patient cemetery. This historic site was rededicated in 2004. Approximately 1,600 patients are buried in graves marked by numbers only, with the more recent having patient names.

Information on Crownsville Hospital can be found in the Maryland State Archives Collections, which contain reference materials from the Hospital, the Auxiliary, Paul Lurz, and Doris Morgenstern Wachsler.

== Property development ==
=== Crownsville Hospital Memorial Park ===
The property was renamed the Crownsville Hospital Memorial Park (CHMP) after it was acquired by Anne Arundel County from the State of Maryland in December 2022. A master plan effort was launched in October 2023 to "envision the future of the site as the green and healing heart of Anne Arundel County."

Anne Arundel County Department of Public Works (DPW) created a consultant team of various DC-Maryland-Virginia based businesses, including a woman-owned historical preservation firm, as well as a sustainability and narrative-focused landscape architect, all led by Baltimore-based design firm, Design Collective.

In collaboration with the local community and residents, a set of goals and values was outlined with a vision for:

- "A place that focuses on mental/physical health and well-being
- A place that is intentional and equitable in providing access
- A place that is truthful about its past
- A place that preserves & celebrates its natural beauty
- A place that protects & restores the best of its built environment
- A place that cultivates educational opportunities"

A final master plan has been developed and is scheduled for release in February 2025.

== In popular culture ==
The 2025 comic series Crownsville by Rodney Barnes and Elia Bonetti takes place at the hospital in the modern day. Barnes' had members of his family that were held at the hospital, and his grandmother was employed there as a nurse.

== See also ==
- Petersburg State Colony for the Negro Insane
