= Studio Mir =

South Korean animation studio

Studio Mir Co., Ltd.
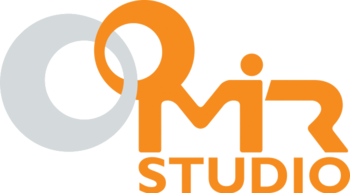
- Native name: 주식회사 스튜디오 미르
- Romanized name: Jusikhoesa Seutyudio Mireu
- Type: Public
- Industry: Traditional hand-drawn 2D Animation; Traditional computer animation 3D computer animation
- Founded: 2010; 16 years ago
- Headquarters: Seoul, South Korea
- Area served: South Korea, United States, China
- Key people: Jae-Myung Yu (CEO)
- Revenue: 17,570,718,243 won (2024)
- Operating income: −1,902,218,175 won (2024)
- Net income: 108,524,281 won (2024)
- Website: www.studiomir.co.kr

Studio Mir Co., Ltd. (Korean: 주식회사 스튜디오 미르; RR: Jusikhoesa Seutyudio Mireu) is a South Korean animation studio based in Seoul. Among other works, the studio animated most of the American TV series The Legend of Korra, the fourth season of The Boondocks, Voltron: Legendary Defender, Kipo and the Age of Wonderbeasts, Dota: Dragon's Blood, Skull Island, My Adventures with Superman, X-Men '97 and Devil May Cry, along with films like Big Fish & Begonia, Mortal Kombat Legends: Scorpion's Revenge and The Witcher: Nightmare of the Wolf.

== History ==
Studio Mir was founded in 2010 by Jae-Myung Yu, together with executive director Kwang-il Han and head of business development Seung-wook Lee. Yu had previously worked for 20 years in animation, including as an animation director for the series Avatar: The Last Airbender. He chose the studio's name after the Soviet space station Mir, which inspired him for its "scientific breakthrough and collaborative spirit".

The studio began work with 20 animators on its first project, the Nickelodeon animated series and Avatar sequel The Legend of Korra – an unusually significant contract for a new studio, which it obtained thanks to Yu's long working relationship with the creators of both series, Bryan Konietzko and Michael Dante DiMartino. Apart from the animation itself, Mir worked with Nickelodeon Animation Studio to contribute in Korra's pre-production and storyboarding, including its elaborate martial arts choreography. Sometime after the conclusion of The Legend of Korra, former Nickelodeon vice president Mark Taylor worked with Studio Mir to create the animation for the sci-fi animated series Voltron: Legendary Defender with some of the creative team from Korra.

Very little of the animation Mir contributed to has aired in South Korea – only the first season of Korra had a "very quiet release". Because of this, the studio is little-known domestically, and, as a consequence, the company is focused on international collaborations.

The studio is working on their first original series titled Koji and looking for investors for the project.

In February 2023, Studio Mir officially became listed on KOSDAQ as a public company.

== Filmography ==
Some titles are listed on the company's online portfolio.

=== TV series ===
Title	Year	Co-production(s)	Network	Notes
The Legend of Korra	2012–2014	Nickelodeon Animation Studio	Nickelodeon	Preproduction assistance for episodes 1–12, 19–20 and 22–26. Animation services for episodes 1–12, 19–20 and 22 onward.
Black Dynamite	2012	Williams Street	Adult Swim	Animation services for episode 5.
The Boondocks	2014	Sony Pictures Television	Adult Swim	Production studio for season 4.
Guardians of the Galaxy	2015	Marvel Animation	Disney XD	Animation services for episodes 1 and 2.
Voltron: Legendary Defender	2016–2018	DreamWorks Animation Television; World Events Productions	Netflix	Preproduction assistance and animation services.
Lego Elves: Secrets of Elvendale	2017	The Lego Group	Netflix	Production studio.
Young Justice: Outsiders	2019	Warner Bros. Animation; DC Entertainment	DC Universe	Animation services for episodes 12 and 16.
Kipo and the Age of Wonderbeasts	2020	DreamWorks Animation Television	Netflix	Animation services
Dota: Dragon's Blood	2021–2022	Kaiju Boulevard	Netflix	Production studio
Young Justice: Phantoms	2021–2022	Warner Bros. Animation; DC Entertainment	HBO Max	Animation services
Harley Quinn	2022–2023	Yes, Norman Productions; Delicious Non-Sequitur; Warner Bros. Animation; DC Entertainment; DC Studios	HBO Max	Animation services for seasons 3 and 4.
Lookism	2022	—N/a	Netflix	Production studio
Skull Island	2023	Powerhouse Animation; J.P. Legendary Television	Netflix	Animation services
My Adventures with Superman	2023–2024	Warner Bros. Animation; DC Entertainment	Adult Swim	Animation services for seasons 1 and 2.
X-Men '97	2024–present	Marvel Studios Animation	Disney+	Animation services
Devil May Cry	2025–present	Shankar Animation; Capcom	Netflix	Production studio
Trigun Stargaze	2026	Orange; Toho Animation	Crunchyroll	CG Modelling Cooperation
Bass X Machina	2026	—N/a	Netflix	Production studio
Upcoming
Gosu	TBA	Toei Animation; Studio N	TBA	Production studio
My Adventures with Green Lantern	TBA	Warner Bros. Animation; DC Studios	TBA	Animation services

Additionally, Studio Mir did edits for the 2014 Disney XD English and Korean dubs of the 2005 series Doraemon.

=== Films ===
Title	Year	Co-production with	Distributors	Notes
Big Fish & Begonia	2016	Horgos Coloroom Pictures; Beijing Enlight Media; Biantian (Beijing) Media	Beijing Enlight Media	Animation services
The Death of Superman	2018	Warner Bros. Animation; DC Entertainment	Warner Bros. Home Entertainment	Animation services
Mortal Kombat Legends: Scorpion's Revenge	2020	Warner Bros. Animation	Warner Bros. Home Entertainment	Preproduction assistance and animation services
Batman: Soul of the Dragon	2021	Warner Bros. Animation; DC Entertainment	Warner Bros. Home Entertainment	Animation services
The Witcher: Nightmare of the Wolf	2021	Little Schmidt Productions; Platige Image; Hivemind	Netflix	Production studio
Mortal Kombat Legends: Battle of the Realms	2021	Warner Bros. Animation	Warner Bros. Home Entertainment	Animation services
Batman and Superman: Battle of the Super Sons	2022	Warner Bros. Animation; DC Entertainment	Warner Bros. Home Entertainment	Animation services
Batman: The Doom That Came to Gotham	2023	Warner Bros. Animation; DC Entertainment	Warner Bros. Home Entertainment	Additional background paint services
Babylon 5: The Road Home	2023	Warner Bros. Animation; Babylonian Productions, Inc; Studio JMS	Warner Bros. Home Entertainment	Animation services
Watchmen	2024	Warner Bros. Animation; DC Entertainment; Paramount Pictures	Warner Bros. Home Entertainment	Animation services
The Witcher: Sirens of the Deep	2025	Little Schmidt Productions; Platige Image; Hivemind	Netflix	Production studio
Avatar Aang: The Last Airbender	2026	Paramount Pictures; Nickelodeon Movies; Avatar Studios	Paramount+	Additional animation services (final 30 minutes of film); Co-production with Flying Bark Productions and Studio Ppuri
Batman: Knightfall – Part 1: Knightfall	2026	Warner Bros. Animation; DC Studios	Warner Bros. Home Entertainment	Animation services
Batman: Knightfall – Part 2: Knightquest	2026	Warner Bros. Animation; DC Studios	Warner Bros. Home Entertainment	Animation services

=== Shorts ===
Title	Year	Co-production with	Notes
Think Like a Man	2012	Rainforest Films	Animated opening sequence.
ASURA Online	2013	Tencent	2D trailer.
League of Legends - Road to the Cup	2013	Riot Games	
Guardians of the Galaxy	2015	Marvel Animation	Season 1 shorts.
League of Legends - Bard: Mountain	2015	Riot Games	
TMNT Summer Shorts	2016	Nickelodeon Animation Studio	Short: "Turtles Take Time (and Space)"
DC Showcase: Sgt. Rock	2019	Warner Bros. Animation; DC Entertainment	
DC Showcase: Death	2019	Warner Bros. Animation; DC Entertainment	
Batman: Death in the Family	2020	Warner Bros. Animation; DC Entertainment	Interactive film
Dota 2 - Marci	2021	Valve	2D animation.
Star Wars: Visions	2023	Lucasfilm	Short: "Journey to the Dark Head"
Wayfinder - Grendel - Character Trailer	2024	Airship Syndicate	Additional animation and composing.

=== Video games ===
Title	Year	Co-production with	Notes
Sackboy: A Big Adventure	2020	Sumo Digital; Sony Interactive Entertainment	2D cutscene animation services

== See also ==
- List of animation studios
- Korean animation
