= Debra L. Lee =

American lawyer

Debra Lee
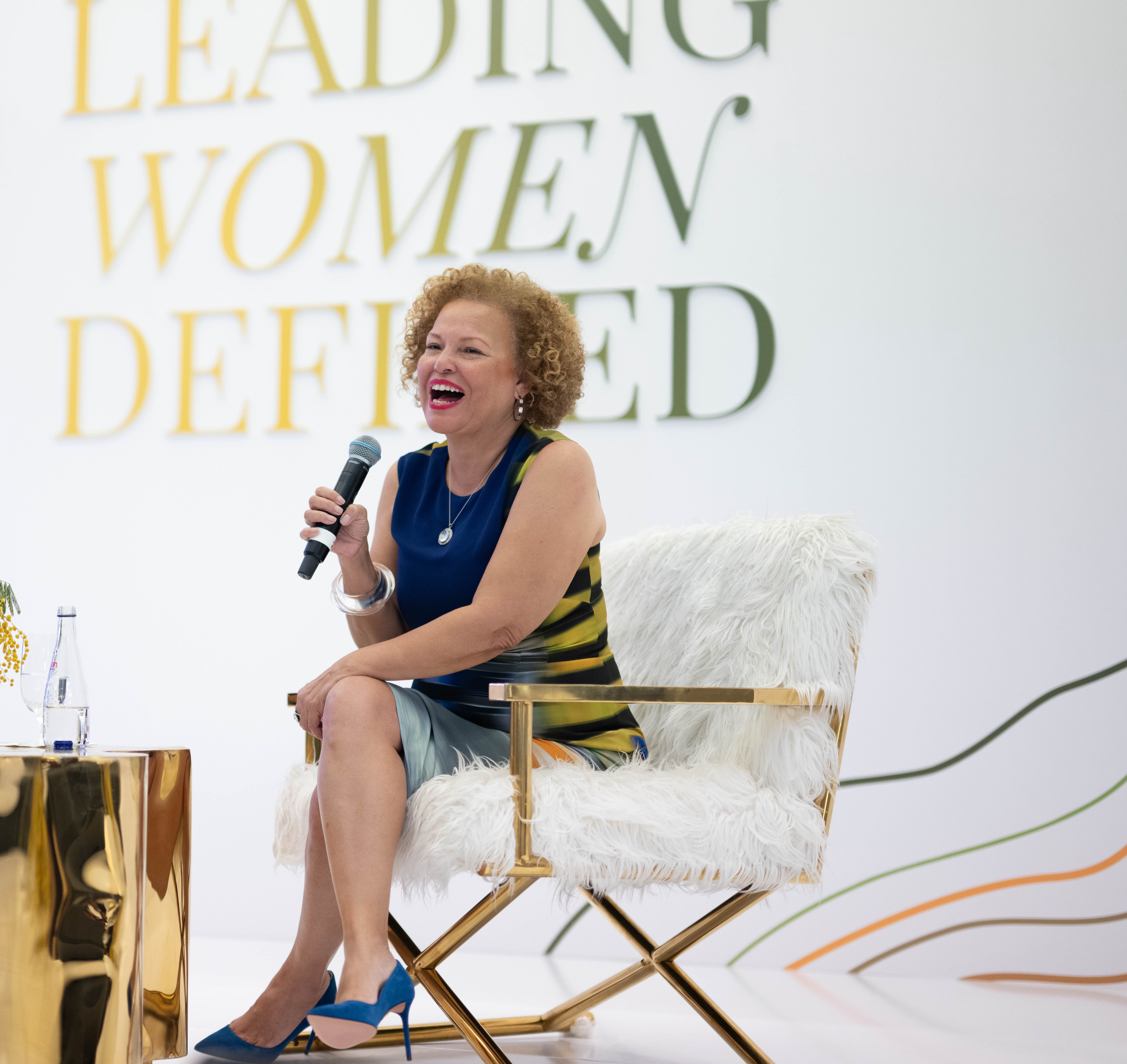

Personal details
- Born: August 8, 1954 (age 72) Fort Jackson, South Carolina, U.S.
- Spouse: Randall Coleman
- Children: 2
- Education: Brown University (BA); Harvard University (JD, MPP)

Debra L. Lee (born August 8, 1954) is an American businesswoman. The Chairman and Chief Executive Officer of BET, the parent company for Black Entertainment Television from 2005-2018, Lee currently serves on the board of directors for Warner Bros. Discovery, Marriott International, and Procter & Gamble. She has previously served on the boards of Burberry, X (formerly Twitter), Revlon, among others. Debra Lee has been named one of the "100 Most Powerful Women in Entertainment" by The Hollywood Reporter due to her achievements in her career at BET.

== Early life and education ==
Debra L. Lee was born in Fort Jackson, South Carolina and grew up in Greensboro, North Carolina. She attended James B. Dudley High School. In 1976, Lee graduated from Brown University with a bachelor's degree in political science with an emphasis in Asian politics. She went on to earn a master's degree in public policy from Harvard University's John F. Kennedy School of Government and a J.D. degree at Harvard Law School, where she was a member of the Board of Student Advisers, in 1980.

She married her college boyfriend Dr. Ernie for two years. Her second marriage was to Randy Coleman. The couple had son Quinn and daughter Ava before divorcing. Quinn died aged 31 in August 2020.

== Early career ==
From August 1981 through September 1981, Lee served as a law clerk to Barrington Parker of the U.S. District Court for the District of Columbia.

Lee joined BET as Vice President of BET's legal affairs department and general counsel in 1986 after over five years as an attorney with Washington, D.C.–based Steptoe & Johnson, a corporate law firm. She has also served as BET's corporate secretary and president and publisher of BET's publishing division, which published Emerge magazine, YSB magazine, BET Weekend, and Heart & Soul magazine.

== Career ==
In March 1996, Lee became president and Chief Operating Officer (COO) of BET Holdings, Inc., replacing departing network founder, Robert L. Johnson. In 2005, she became president and Chief Executive Officer (CEO). The company had nearly $100 million in revenue last year.

During Lee's tenure, Under Lee, Black Entertainment Television reformatted for the network. She increased the production budget by 50% and looked into incorporating original programming by getting 16 new shows for the new 2007 season. Lee also redesigned BET's mission statement by supporting families, encouraging their dreams, and presenting fresh talent by creating new shows for its network. She created a new entertainment network, CENTRIC, in September 2009 that features new artists, reality shows, and movies.

In 2010, Debra launched the invite-only Leading Women Defined (LWD) Summit to give Black women executives a safe and supportive space for networking and to navigate the hurdles they face in their careers. Leading Women Defined continues to impact Black women executives through its yearly summit and local events.

In 2021, Debra co-founded The Monarch’s Collective, consulting firm focused on elevating Black executives and women to board and c-suite roles. At the time of launch, Lee said of the company: “Changing the complexion of leadership creates incredible value for the company and the community. Businesses with diverse boards and leadership teams perform better. We know what it takes to help companies transform from the inside out, and it starts at the top. Companies need a new way to diversify board rooms and leadership — and we have the expertise to accelerate their efforts.”

Lee published her memoir, I AM DEBRA LEE, in March 2023, which was hailed by Kirkus Reviews as “a provocatively frank and inspiring memoir.” Vulture also praised the book saying: “The BET network’s former CEO has seemingly done the impossible: written a Fortune 500 memoir that may actually be useful to more than the one percent. Lee navigates a career in law and then television all while staying true to her values, putting Black stories and audiences first. It’s less about surviving corporate America and more about making it a better, more equitable place for women of color to thrive.” She became an honorary member of Delta Sigma Theta sorority in 2023.

== Directorships ==
Lee sits on the boards of Marriott, Procter & Gamble, and Warner Bros. Discovery. She has previously served on the boards of Burberry, X (formerly Twitter), Revlon, National Cable & Telecommunications Association, the Ad Council, and the National Cable Television Association, among others. Lee is also a director of WGL Holdings (since 2000) and the Monsanto subsidiary Genuity. In May 2016, Lee was added to the board of directors of Twitter, following an attempt by returning CEO Jack Dorsey to boost diversity across the social media company's board. Since 2022, Lee has served as a director of Warner Bros. Discovery.

== Awards and honors ==
Debra has been called the Godmother of Black entertainment, and has been lauded for her work with numerous awards including the Ebony Power 100 Chairman's Award, the Business Leadership Award by the Africa America Institute, BET’s Ultimate Icon Award, The Hollywood Reporter’s Women in Entertainment Power 100, and appeared multiple times in Billboard’s Power100 List. In 2017, Debra became the first woman honored by the Recording Academy with the Salute to Industry Icons Award, and in 2019, she was inducted to the American Advertising Federation’s Hall of Fame.

- Broadcasting and Cable Hall of Fame
- 2002: Women of Vision Award by Women in Film & Video – DC
- 2013: The Hollywood Reporter’s Women in Entertainment Power100
- 2014: Received an honorary Doctorate of Humane Letters from Brown University.
- Multiple Years - Billboard’s Power 100 List
- 2012: Billboard Power 100
- 2013: Billboard Power 100
- 2015: Billboard's 2015 Power 100 List
- 2017: No. 82: Debra Lee & Stephen Hill | Power 100
- 2018: No. 91: Debra Lee | Power 100
- 2017: Grammy Salute to Industry Icons Award (first woman ever to receive this honor)
- 2018: EBONY Power 100 Chairman’s Award
- 2018: PromaxBDA Lifetime Achievement Award
- 2018 BET Ultimate Icon Award
- 2019 American Advertising Federation Hall of Fame
- 2023: "Business Leadership Award" by the Africa America Institute at their 70th Anniversary Gala
- 2023: Variety Magazine’s 50 Greatest Hip-Hop Executives of All Time
- 2024: Big Brothers Big Sisters Greater Los Angeles’ Defender of Potential Award
