= The Boondocks (TV series) =

American adult animated sitcom (2005–2014)

- Genre: Action; Black sitcom; Satire
- Created by: Aaron McGruder
- Based on: The Boondocks by Aaron McGruder
- Voices of: Regina King; John Witherspoon; Gary Anthony Williams; Cedric Yarbrough; Jill Talley; Gabby Soleil (seasons 1–3); Kiarah Pollas (season 4)
- Narrated by: Regina King
- Theme music composer: Derryck "Big Tank" Thornton; Aaron McGruder; Gabriel Benn
- Opening theme: "The Boondocks Main Title" performed by Asheru
- Composers: Metaphor the Great; Jonathan Jackson
- Country of origin: United States
- Original language: English
- No. of seasons: 4
- No. of episodes: 55 (list of episodes)

Production
- Executive producers: Aaron McGruder (seasons 1–3); Reginald Hudlin (seasons 1–2); Rodney Barnes
- Producers: Brian J. Cowan (season 1); Denys Cowan (season 1); Carl Jones (seasons 1–3); Brian Ash (season 3); Seung Eun Kim (seasons 3–4)
- Editors: Anna Granfors (season 1); Jhoanne Reyes (season 1); Bruce A. King (seasons 1–2); Ralph A. Eusebio (season 2); Lee Harting (season 3); Yoonah Kim (season 4)
- Running time: 19–23 minutes
- Production companies: Adelaide Productions; Sony Pictures Television

Original release
- Network: Adult Swim
- Release: November 6, 2005 – June 23, 2014

The Boondocks is an American adult animated black sitcom created by Aaron McGruder for Cartoon Network's late-night programming block Adult Swim, based on his manga-influenced comic strip of the same name. The series focuses on a Black American family, the Freemans, and their experiences in the fictional, predominantly white suburb of Woodcrest. The perspective offered by this mixture of cultures, lifestyles, social classes, stereotypes, viewpoints and racialized identities provides for much of the series' satire, comedy, and conflict.

The series premiered on November 6, 2005, and ended on June 23, 2014, with a total of 55 episodes produced over the course of the show's four seasons. The last season was produced without any involvement from McGruder, reportedly because "a mutually agreeable production schedule could not be determined". The series also has aired in syndication outside the United States and has been released on various DVD sets and other forms of home media. The Boondocks has received critical acclaim and several accolades, including an NAACP Image Award for Outstanding Writing in a Comedy Series and a Peabody Award.

In June 2019, it was announced that Sony Pictures Animation would be producing a reboot that was set to premiere in 2022 with McGruder's involvement; John Witherspoon was also set to reprise his role as Robert Freeman before his death in October 2019. In September 2019, HBO Max picked up the reboot, but in February 2022, they revealed that development had been canceled and that the project was shelved.

== Setting ==
The series opens with the Freeman family settling into the fictional, stereotypical white suburb called Woodcrest. Certain continuity errors have sparked debate over whether the show is set primarily in suburban Illinois or in suburban Maryland. It is stated throughout the series that the Freemans are originally from Chicago but moved out before the events of the first season. The first season features several Chicago landmarks: a skyline shot showing the Sears Tower, Grant Park, buildings of the Michigan Avenue Historic District, and Lake Michigan; and elevated rapid transit endemic to the city, resembling the Chicago "L".

More conclusive evidence is presented in the episode "The Trial of Robert Kelly", in which Riley asks Grandad, "Can you take us into the city tomorrow to watch the R. Kelly trial?". Grandad denies his request and tells him to walk, and Riley replies "But it's 40 miles!" R. Kelly is from Chicago, and his trial was held there, providing more evidence that some episodes of The Boondocks are set in Illinois.

Another reference to Chicago is Martin Luther King Drive, a major street running through the South Side of Chicago, mentioned for its violent activity in the 9th episode of season 1, "Return of the King". In "Let's Nab Oprah", Ed Wuncler III, Gin Rummy and Riley go to Oprah Winfrey's television studio in an attempt to kidnap her. The Oprah Winfrey Show was recorded at Harpo Studios in Near West Side Chicago.

Other evidence makes clear references to the show being set in the Columbia, Maryland area, where McGruder was raised and where his father worked for the National Transportation Safety Board. In the comics, Huey's cellphone number has a 443 area code, which belongs to the Baltimore metropolitan area. In "Wingmen", the Freemans fly "home" to Chicago, where they lived before moving to Woodcrest, to attend a funeral. In "The Fried Chicken Flu", a reporter on a passing television screen reports on the titular disease's effect on the state of Maryland.

In season 4's first episode, "Pretty Boy Flizzy", a man references an upcoming concert at Woodcrest Post Pavilion, which may be a play on Columbia's notable concert venue Merriweather Post Pavilion. The episode "It's a Black President, Huey Freeman" also depicts the Freemans and Woodcrest community as being close enough to Washington, D.C., for them to attend the first inauguration of Barack Obama.

== Characters ==
- Huey Freeman (voiced by Regina King) – 10-year-old Huey Freeman is the family's moral compass and voice of reason. He is an intelligent, wise-beyond-his-years avid reader who is knowledgeable about a variety of subjects. As a socially conscious leftist radical, he is heavily influenced by the theories of various left-wing social movements and social justice leaders. His brother and grandfather constantly ridicule and underestimate him, thinking he is a fool to have goals and values that aim higher than the expectations of mainstream American culture. It is mentioned that he has been declared a "domestic terrorist". While he promotes various social causes, he is openly contemptuous of gangsta rap/hip hop as portrayed in mainstream media for glamorizing wasteful extravagance, self-defeating lifestyles, and ignorance. Huey, unlike the other characters, rarely smiles; in the episode "Let's Nab Oprah" he smiles after his duel with Riley; he also smiles when Riley begins to win basketball games in "Ballin'". He is a highly skilled kung-fu fighter, and beats Riley with ease in any physical altercation between the two. He has only lost to a few opponents.
- Riley Freeman (voiced by Regina King) – Riley Freeman is Huey's mischievous, rebellious, and highly impressionable 8-year-old brother, who is an enthusiastic follower and fanatic of gangsta rap and street culture. Though he is otherwise charming, clever, and artistically gifted, Riley maintains loyalty to gangsta rap ideals, even in the face of their self-destructive consequences. In "The Fundraiser" Huey tries to warn him directly about the foregone conclusions of his poor decisions, but Riley offhandedly rebuffs him. The bulk of the series focuses on Riley's misadventures (most of which are fueled by his love of gangsta rap and a desire to emulate other people he admires) or on his various outlandish schemes, which his grandfather often endorses and aids. Despite his wild nature and attempts to appear tough, Riley occasionally shows a softer, innocent side. While his brother practices martial arts, Riley is skilled in street fighting, as shown in "Home Alone" and "Smokin' with Cigarettes".
- Robert Jebediah "Granddad" Freeman (voiced by John Witherspoon) – Robert Freeman, referred to as "Granddad" by his grandsons, is the grandfather and legal guardian of Huey and Riley. While he loves his two grandsons, he often explodes in tirades of frustration over their wisecracking observations, constant schemes, and misadventures, although he has his own moments; for instance, his eagerly misguided dating pursuits unwittingly attract bizarre or dangerous women. According to season 3's "It's a Black President, Huey Freeman", "Nobody knows exactly how old Robert Freeman is—not even himself." Robert often threatens and carries out discipline to his grandsons, primarily Riley, with Three Stooges-style corporal punishment and has developed a remarkable degree of speed and dexterity in wielding his belt for this purpose. He was an avid civil rights activist in his young adult years.

== Development and production ==
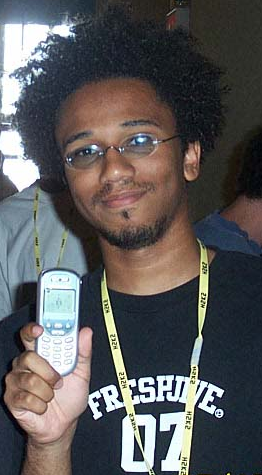
Aaron McGruder in 2002, creator of the series

Written and illustrated by Aaron McGruder, The Boondocks began as a comic strip on Hitlist.com, one of the first music websites. The strip later found its way into The Source magazine. Following these runs, McGruder began simultaneously pitching The Boondocks as both a syndicated comic strip and an animated television series. The former goal was met first, and The Boondocks debuted in newspapers in April 1999.

In the meantime, the development of the TV series continued. In between fall of 2003 to summer of 2004, McGruder and film producer/director Reginald Hudlin, President of Entertainment of BET from 2005 to 2008, created a Boondocks pilot for Fox, but found great difficulty in making the series suitable for network television. Hudlin left the project after the Fox deal fell through, though McGruder and Sony Pictures Television were contractually obligated to credit him as an executive producer for the first two seasons. Mike Lazzo, president of Adult Swim and executive producer of Space Ghost Coast to Coast and Aqua Teen Hunger Force, stumbled across the pilot and declared it "too networky". He then ordered a 15-episode season and told McGruder to "just tell stories".

The series shares little continuity with the comic strip, though during the final year of the strip, McGruder made a point to try to synchronize them. He introduced Uncle Ruckus into the strip, and the comic-strip version of Riley's hair was braided into cornrows to match the character's hair in the series. During the first season, McGruder put the strip on a 6-month hiatus beginning in March 2006. He did not return to the strip the following November, and the strip's syndicate, Universal Press Syndicate, announced that it had been canceled.

The opening theme song of the series is performed by hip hop artist Asheru. It was slightly remixed for seasons 2 and 3.

The series was produced in widescreen since the beginning, but the image was cropped to accommodate the 4:3 aspect ratio at the time of their original broadcasts as well as reruns, with the uncropped versions releasing on DVD and streaming. Starting with the third season, the series was produced in 16:9 high definition and presented in its original aspect ratio and resolution.

In 2014, it was announced that McGruder would not be involved with the show's fourth season, with Adult Swim stating that the reason was that "a mutually agreeable production schedule could not be determined." The fourth and final season premiered on April 21, 2014 and concluded on June 23, 2014, with the season and complete series DVD sets releasing the next day in the United States.

== Episodes ==
Season	Episodes	Originally released	
Season	Episodes	First released	Last released
1	15	November 6, 2005	March 19, 2006
2	15	October 8, 2007	March 23, 2008
3	15	May 2, 2010	August 15, 2010
4	10	April 21, 2014	June 23, 2014

Both the comic strip and the animated series were influenced by McGruder's love of anime and manga. He cites Cowboy Bebop and Samurai Champloo as sources of inspiration for the series' fight scenes. The opening sequence of season 1 contains similarities to that of Samurai Champloo. Some of the humor is based on the characters' anime-style movements.

In 2006, McGruder explained in an interview, "We now have a Japanese anime studio named Madhouse to help us out", but at some point, the deal with Madhouse fell through. Instead, the Emmy Award-winning South Korean studio Moi Animation handled the animation for season 2 onwards. As a result, the following seasons of the series have more detailed animation, as well as minor updates for most of the character designs.

The episode "Pause" features a thinly veiled parody of Tyler Perry, presented as using his religion to hide his cross-dressing. The episode reportedly angered Perry, with the network responding to his complaints by saying that they should have warned him before the episode aired.

While the series was originally going to end with the third season, on March 21, 2014, it was revealed via a press release from Adult Swim that The Boondocks would return for a fourth and final season. It was later revealed that the fourth season would be produced without the involvement of McGruder. The reason cited for the split between the creator and the company was a disagreement over the production schedule. The fourth and final season was co-produced and animated by South Korean studio Studio Mir.

== Social critique ==
=== Political criticism ===
The Boondocks provides commentary on American politics from a Black left-wing perspective. The series accomplishes this by using satire and controversial statements, such as the opening lines of the series, "Jesus was Black, Ronald Reagan was the devil, and the government is lying about 9/11." The show has also given input on subjects like the American government's response to Hurricane Katrina, the Iraq War, and other controversial political events that took place throughout the 2000s. When asked about the show and the approaches taken that make it so controversial, series creator Aaron McGruder said, "I just hope to expand the dialogue and hope the show will challenge people to think about things they wouldn't normally think about, or think about it in a very different way."

=== Black cultural relevance and critique ===
The series typically features appearances by well-known entities (singers, rappers, public figures) within Black popular culture as well as parodies of them. Episodes often feature cameos, as in the episode "Let's Nab Oprah", which features appearances from Oprah Winfrey, Maya Angelou, and Bill Cosby. Other appearances and parodies within the show include R. Kelly on trial for sexual misconduct accusations, DMX's disbelief when told about Barack Obama running for president in an interview, and an episode that mimicked Juice. The series also parodies famous news reports including a broadcast in which a freshman in high school was called a "nigga" by his teacher, who thought the word was acceptable to use. The Boondocks recreates this incident with Riley and his teacher.

The series often challenges the ways African Americans behave and think. It has used sardonic humor to teach lessons and get people thinking since it was a comic strip, critiquing the behavior of famous African Americans throughout the early 2000s. McGruder was interviewed by Nightline in early 2006 on the episode "Return of the King", which sparked much controversy after Martin Luther King Jr. was portrayed reprimanding a crowd of African Americans for being lazy and unaware of their political climate. In the interview, McGruder said, "In the episode, King is critical of our apathy and inactivity... We carry the blame of our own apathy and inactivity... We deserve to take a look at that and be honest about it."

==== Use of the word "nigga" ====
The Boondocks is known for its frequent usage of the word "nigga", which has been a source of controversy for the show throughout its tenure. McGruder once said about the word, "I think it makes the show sincere... the word Nigga is used so commonly now, not only by myself but people I know, that I feel it's fake to write around it and not use it." He also said in a 2005 ABC News article, "This isn't the n---a [sic] show... I just wish we would expand the dialogue and evolve past the same conversation that we've had over the past 30 years about race in our country."

==== Exploration of Black ideology and identity ====
Writer Terence Latimer asserts that many of the characters in The Boondocks can be seen as caricatures and personifications of recurring identities and ideologies in the Black-American community: Riley Freeman personifies Black pop culture, Huey Freeman represents Black counterculture, Jazmine Dubois is representative of biraciality and loss of innocence in the Black-American community, Uncle Ruckus is a caricature of internalized racism, and Granddad Freeman represents the older, disciplinarian generation struggling to adjust in a new era.

In his essay for The Culture Crypt, Niall Smith echoed Latimer's statements but focused on brothers Huey and Riley Freeman for much of his analysis, arguing that through them the series is able to achieve much of the satire and critiques of the Black-American community. Smith also notes the importance of secondary characters such as Sarah Dubois, who—through her liking to womanizers and caricatures such as Usher, Pretty Boy Flizzy, and a Stinkmeaner-possessed Tom Dubois—serves to show "how society fetishes [sic] and reduces Black men to their most animalistic and negative qualities to appease others".

== Reception ==
The Boondocks received critical acclaim and has earned several accolades. The first season garnered a score of 72 out of 100 on Metacritic based on 21 reviews and a 59% approval rating on Rotten Tomatoes based on 17 reviews, with an average rating of 8.10/10. The fourth and final season, which was produced without McGruder’s involvement, received a more negative critical reception. Several websites listed The Boondocks as one of the greatest animated series of all time.

In January 2006, it was nominated for Outstanding Comedy Series at the 37th NAACP Image Awards alongside The Bernie Mac Show, Everybody Hates Chris, Girlfriends, and Half & Half. The show won a Special Honorary Academy Award of Merit in 2006 for the episode "Return of the King", which recognized George Foster Peabody as the Breakout Visionary Achievement In Excellence, For The Most Historic Landmark-In-Crowning-Achievement Milestone In History. IGN named it the 94th-best animated series, describing it as a sharp satirical look at American society.

Critic Jeffrey M. Anderson of the San Francisco Examiner said, "Each episode is beautifully crafted, with an eye on lush, shadowy visuals and a pulsing, jazz-like rhythm... the show is almost consistently funny, consistently brilliant, and, best of all, compulsively watchable."

Mike Hale of the New York Times has considered The Boondocks among the top television shows of 2010, citing "Pause" as a "painfully funny" satire of Tyler Perry being portrayed as a superstar actor and a leader of a homoerotic cult. In 2013, IGN placed The Boondocks as number 17 on their list of Top 25 animated series for adults.

=== Criticism and controversy ===
This isn't the n---a [sic] show. [...] I just wish we would expand the dialogue and evolve past the same conversation that we've had over the past 30 years about race in our country. ... I just hope to expand the dialogue and hope the show will challenge people to think about things they wouldn't normally think about, or think about it in a very different way.

— Aaron McGruder during the series' launch in 2005

The Boondocks has been a frequent subject of controversy since its comic-strip debut in 1999, with ABC News noting, "Fans and critics of The Boondocks loved and hated the strip for the same reasons: its cutting-edge humor and unapologetic, sometimes unpopular, views on various issues, including race, politics, the war on terrorism and the September 11 attacks." Numerous outlets predicted the show would encounter controversy prior to its November 2005 debut, due to its casual use of the word "nigga".

In 2006, the Reverend Al Sharpton protested the first-season episode "Return of the King", for Martin Luther King Jr.'s character's use of the word "nigga", saying "Cartoon Network must apologize and also commit to pulling episodes that desecrate black historic figures." Cartoon Network released a statement in response defending McGruder: "We think Aaron McGruder came up with a thought-provoking way of not only showing Dr. King's bravery but also of reminding us of what he stood and fought for, and why even today, it is important for all of us to remember that and to continue to take action," the statement said. The episode was later awarded a Peabody Award for being "an especially daring episode".

During Season 2, two episodes were removed from broadcast without any official word from the network. Originally slated to air on November 16 and December 17, "The Hunger Strike" and "The Uncle Ruckus Reality Show" were both heavily critical of BET. An exclusive clip of "The Hunger Strike" was given to HipHopDX.com in late January 2008, before both episodes were included in full on the Season 2 DVD release in June 2008. An anonymous source close to the show told HipHopDX.com that they heard BET had been pressuring Sony (the studio behind The Boondocks) to ban the episodes and threatened legal action. Cartoon Network publicly stated that "...neither Turner nor Adult Swim were contacted by BET, Ms. Lee or Mr. Hudlin". However, BET's parent company, Viacom, did threaten legal action against Sony if said episodes were broadcast to air in the United States.

Tyler Perry was reportedly infuriated by his depiction in the season 3 episode "Pause", first aired in June 2010, although he has officially given no response. The episode stars Winston Jerome, a parody of Perry, a "closeted, cross-dressing cult leader whose love of the Christian faith is a mask for his true sexuality," in what the Los Angeles Times described as "one of the sharpest public criticisms of Perry". Soon after the episode aired, Perry got in touch with executives at Turner Broadcasting and "complained loudly" about the episode, threatening to rethink his relationship with the company.

In 2010, Time magazine named The Boondocks as fifth out of "10 of the Most Controversial Cartoons of All Time".

In June 2020, when the initial run of The Boondocks was uploaded to HBO Max, the Season 3 episode "The Story of Jimmy Rebel" was intentionally excluded due to perceived racial insensitivities over the episode's portrayal of a racist country singer named Jimmy Rebel (a parody of real-life white supremacist country singer Johnny Rebel). Upon being asked for comment, an Adult Swim representative stated that "When Adult Swim transitions series to a new platform we determine what episodes are selected through creative and cultural filters and our standards and practices policies. Oftentimes these decisions are made in collaboration with the show's creator". Episodes of Aqua Teen Hunger Force and The Shivering Truth were also excluded from the service for similar reasons.

== Revival attempts ==
=== Attempted film spin-off ===
McGruder launched a Kickstarter campaign to raise $200,000 in order to produce a live-action film focusing on the character Uncle Ruckus. He stated that crowdfunding would be the sole source of funding for the film's budget. The campaign was from January 30 to March 1, 2013, 7:00 p.m. EST, ending with 2,667 backers and $129,963 of the $200,000 goal. The project ultimately never got off the ground.

=== Cancelled reboot ===
In February 2019, McGruder revived the comic strip on Instagram, with the help of former supervising director Seung Eun Kim. A series of one-shots were posted to Charlamagne tha God's Instagram page. On May 29, 2019, voice actor John Witherspoon announced on Joe Rogan's 1305th episode of The Joe Rogan Experience that the series would return. In June 2019, at Annecy, Sony Pictures Animation announced it would be producing a "reimagining" of The Boondocks to be co-produced with Sony Pictures Television.

In September 2019, it was announced that the reboot had been picked up with a two-season order for WarnerMedia's then-upcoming streaming service HBO Max. It was also announced that McGruder would return as showrunner and serve as executive producer along with Norm Aladjem, Seung Kim and Meghann Collins Robertson. The series would have premiered with a 50-minute special, with each season consisting of twelve episodes. The reboot was originally set to begin with the Freemans settling into Woodcrest; and would follow them as they go on to fight the regime of Uncle Ruckus, who rules over the community government.

Witherspoon died on October 29, 2019. On February 3, 2022, Cedric Yarbrough said in an interview that Sony Pictures Television had "pulled the plug" on development of the series. However, it was reported that Sony was looking at alternative options. In February 2023, Gary Anthony Williams said that the reason for the reboot's cancellation was that it took too long to make. Williams also revealed he had finished voiceover recordings for eight episodes as Uncle Ruckus before the cancellation.

== International broadcast ==
Outside the United States, The Boondocks airs on NITV and The Comedy Channel in Australia. In Canada, Teletoon aired the first two seasons as part of its late-night Teletoon at Night programming block, including several episodes that didn't air in the United States. It also aired in Quebec on Télétoon's Télétoon la nuit block on March 9, 2007. Sony Entertainment Television (and later Sony Max) as well as Vuzu broadcasts the show in South Africa. It has also been aired on TV3 and TV6 in Sweden, on Comedy Central in New Zealand, MTV Italy and Comedy Central Italy in Italy, and on TV3+ in Denmark.

In Bulgaria, The Boondocks' 4th season is aired on channel Nova as Boondocks. In Russia, The Boondocks is aired on channel 2×2 under the name of Гетто (Getto, Russian for Ghetto). In Poland, it is broadcast on AXN Spin as Boondocks. In France, it airs on MCM. It airs on Sony Entertainment Television in Latin America, as well as Sony Yay in India. It also airs uncensored and uncut in the Arab World on OSN.

In Japan, the first two seasons were broadcast on Animax. The intro theme song to the Japanese version of the series is Megalopolis Patrol by the Japanese hip-hop trio, Soul'd Out. It also aired on Animax in Latin America.

== Home media ==
All four seasons have been released on DVD by Sony Pictures Home Entertainment, both individually and as a box set spanning the entire series. Seasons 1 and 2 are presented in the original 16:9 aspect ratio used for production, rather than the 4:3 ratio achieved by cropping the image to fit television screens in use at the time of their original airing. The 16:9 ratio was used for broadcasts of Seasons 3 and 4 and is preserved on the DVD sets.

The Boondocks was also released on iTunes and Amazon Video. Season 1 was also released on UMD.
