= Rodney Barnes =

American screenwriter and producer

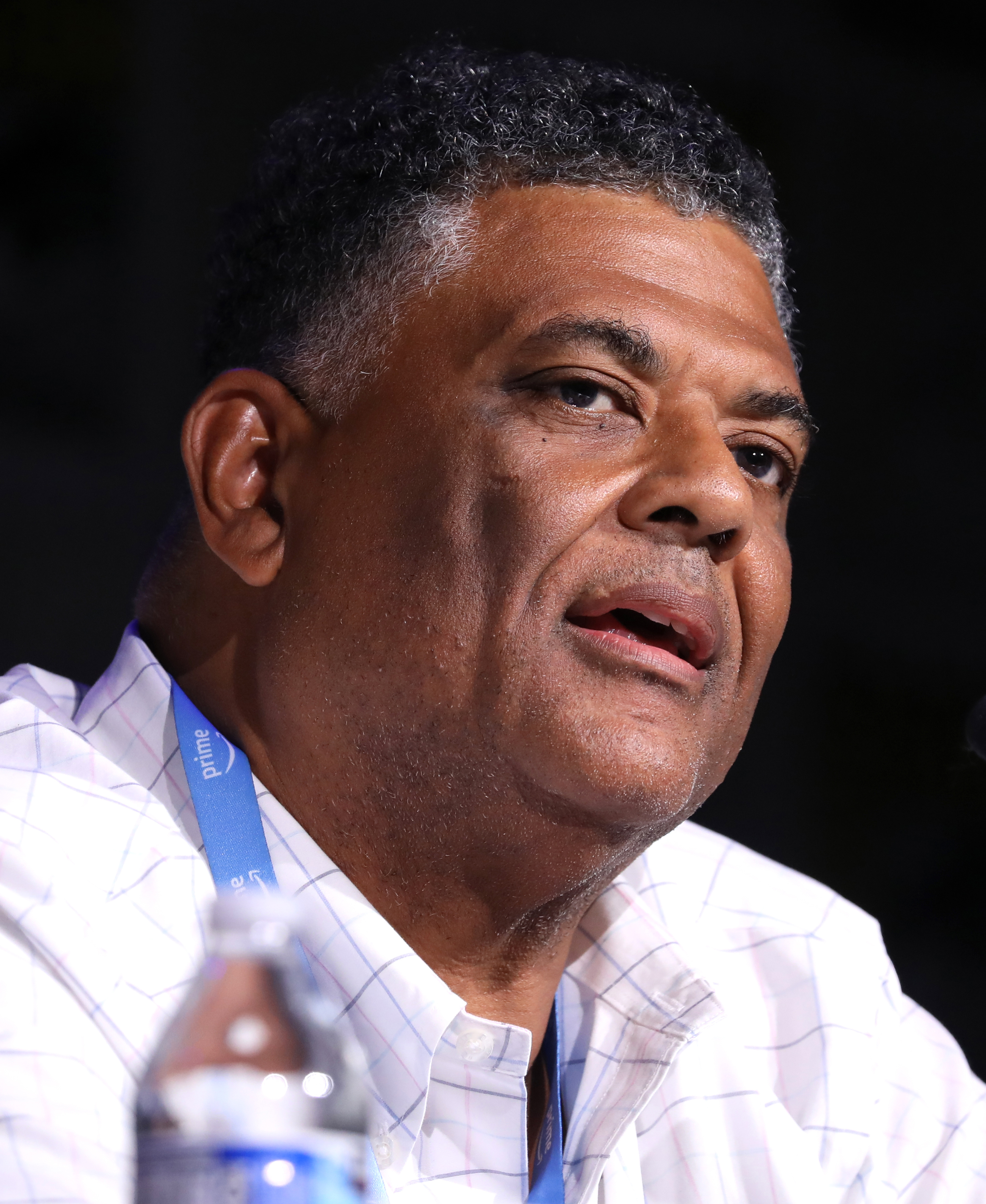
Barnes at the 2023 San Diego Comic-Con

Rodney Barnes is an American screenwriter and producer. He has written and produced The Boondocks, My Wife and Kids, Everybody Hates Chris, Those Who Can't, Marvel's Runaways, American Gods, Wu-Tang: An American Saga, and was an executive producer/writer/actor on HBO's Winning Time: The Rise of the Lakers Dynasty.

Barnes has also earned top honors for his work from the Peabody Awards, American Film Institute, Writers Guild of America, BET Comedy Awards, and NAACP Image Awards.

== Early life ==
Rodney Barnes was born September 19 in Annapolis, Maryland. During his childhood he quickly gravitated to comic books, primarily superhero style, horror and science fiction. He attended Howard University in Washington, DC. In 1995, Barnes decided to move to Los Angeles to pursue his dream of screenwriting.

== Career ==
Barnes was a producer and writer for the Damon Wayans show My Wife and Kids, from 2001 to 2005. He was then a co-executive producer and writer of Chris Rock's TV series Everybody Hates Chris, from 2005 to 2009. He was also the co-executive producer of 'Til Death in 2010, and a consulting producer of Brothers in 2009.

After completing 4 seasons of the critically acclaimed animated comedy The Boondocks, where he served as executive producer and head writer from 2005 to 2014, he was a consulting producer on the TruTV sitcom Those Who Can't, co-executive producer for the second season of the Comedy Central animated sitcom Legends of Chamberlain Heights and co-executive producer for the unproduced second season of Vinyl for HBO. He then served as Co-Executive producer/Writer on Hulu's upcoming adaptation of Marvel's Runaways. In between he was nominated for writing special material by the Writers Guild of America for his work on the 88th Academy Awards, hosted by comedian Chris Rock.

Barnes then served as executive producer for the unproduced Starz drama Heels. He has also been developing the animated series Vandaveon and Mike, based on characters created by and starring Keegan-Michael Key and Jordan Peele for Comedy Central, and "Killogy", a graphic novel series from creator Alan Robert.

In 2017, Barnes ventured into writing for his first love, comic books. He authored "Birth of a Patriot," a short story in Marvel Comics' Secret Empire spin-off "Brave New World" #2. He then penned the Falcon (comics) series for the Marvel Legacy Imprint, the mini-series "Lando: Double or Nothing" for Marvel/Lucasfilm based on the character Lando Calrissian from the Star Wars franchise, and is currently writing "Quincredible" for the Lion Forge imprint and "Killadelphia" for Image Comics.

As well, Barnes co-wrote the adaption of Arc of Justice, which is set to be produced/financed by the Mark Gordon Company, directed by José Padilha and starring Russell Crowe and David Oyelowo. It is the story of the landmark civil rights case of Ossian Sweet. The screenplay was honored by the Blacklist as one of the year's best-unproduced screenplays.

Barnes is also developing Atlanta's Most Wanted, a one-hour crime drama starring T.I., for the Fox Broadcasting Company and producer Jerry Bruckheimer and is attached to write and showrun Things That Make White People Uncomfortable, an anthology series based on the book of the same name, written by former NFL defensive lineman Michael Bennett. He is also writing an untitled creature feature film to be directed by Jordan Roberts for New Regency.

He is also the co-founder of Dark Apocrypha Productions, a production company based in Los Angeles, that creates both traditional and branded content projects. Formerly, he was a columnist for the Huffington Post. In 2020, he signed a deal with HBO.

In 2022, Barnes founded publishing company Zombie Love Studios (ZLOS) and published Eisner nominated graphic novel "Blacula: Return of the King" with artist Jason Shawn Alexander. Additionally, his graphic novel "Florence and Normandie", a project collaboration with entertainer Xzibit and artist Jonathan Wayshack, are both published under the ZLOS imprint. Also in 2022, Barnes wrote The Mandalorian: Season One for Marvel Comics, illustrated by Georges Jeanty and adapting the first season of the Disney+ series The Mandalorian.

Barnes was also host for the Winning Time Podcast, which won a Signal Award, and is host and co-creator of the podcast Run, Fool!, a project in conjunction with MrBallen, at Will Media, and Campside Media.

In 2025, Barnes wrote Crownsville, a five-issue horror comic series illustrated by Elia Bonetti and published by Oni Press. The series takes place at Crownsville Hospital Center. It won the 2026 Dwayne McDuffie Award for Diversity in Comics.

== Awards ==
Barnes has received a Peabody Award for "The Return of the King" episode of The Boondocks, and the American Film Institute Award in 2007 for Everybody Hates Chris.

He has also been nominated for a BET Comedy Award for My Wife and Kids, the NAACP Image Award for The Boondocks, and the Writers Guild of America Award for Everybody Hates Chris and the 88th Academy Awards.

In honor of his accomplishments, Barnes was presented with a key to the City of Annapolis in June of 2022.

In 2024, Barnes would be a recipient of the Inkpot Award at the annual San Diego Comic Con.

== See also ==
- List of Everybody Hates Chris episodes
- List of The Boondocks episodes
- List of My Wife and Kids episodes
