= Carl Jones =

Carl Jones may refer to:

- Carl G. Jones (born 1954), Welsh biologist and conservationist
- Carl Jones (footballer) (born 1986), English defender
- Carl Jones (basketball) (born 1991), American point guard
- Carl Jones Jr. (born 2001), American football linebacker
- Carl Jones (producer), producer and voice actor of The Boondocks TV series
- Carl Henry Jones (1893–1958), United States Navy admiral

== See also ==
- Carl T. Jones Field, or Huntsville International Airport, near Huntsville, Alabama, U.S.
- Karl Jones (born 1957), Welsh racing driver
