= LeSean Thomas =

American television animation producer

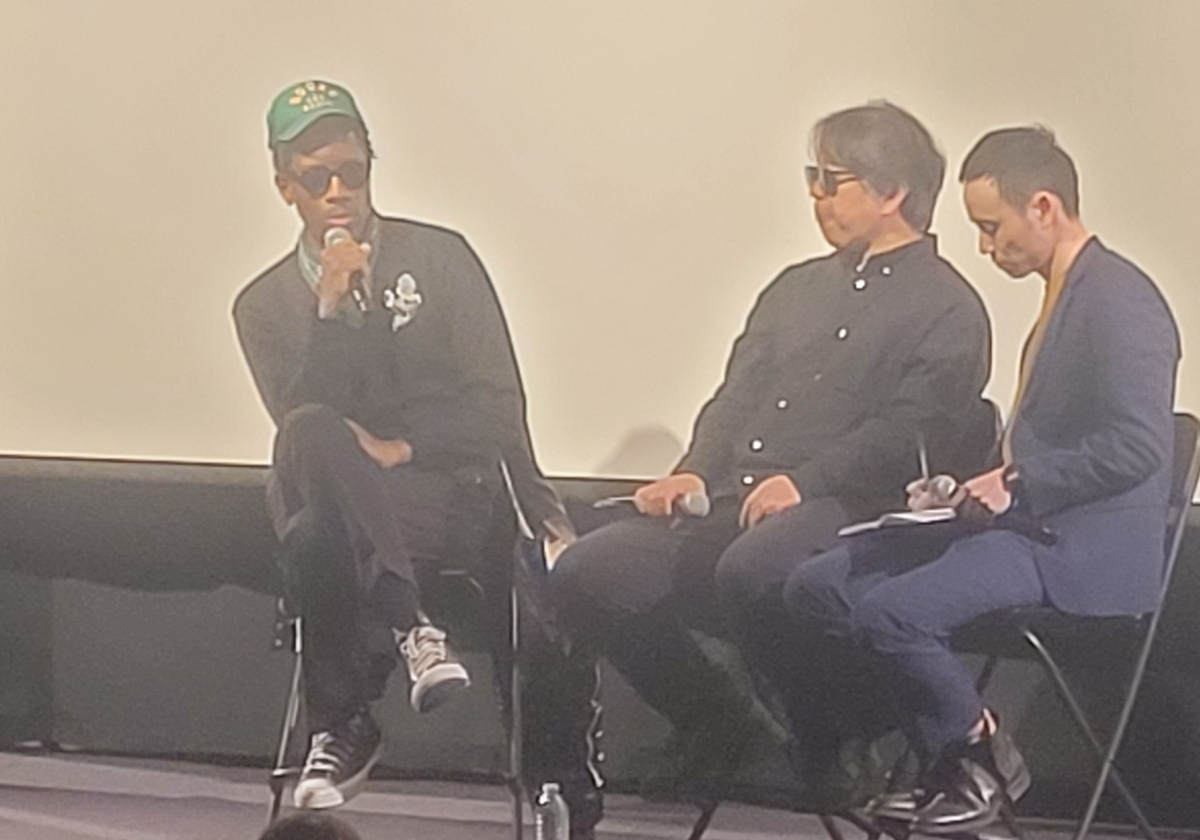
- LeSean Thomas (left) with Shinichiro Watanabe (middle) at Japan Society in NYC, November 2025
- Born: 1975 (age 50–51) South Bronx, New York City, U.S.
- Areas: Producer, director, writer, comic book artist, animator, storyboard artist, character designer
- Notable works: Bass X Machina; Yasuke; Cannon Busters; Children of Ether; The Legend of Korra; Black Dynamite; The Boondocks

LeSean Thomas (born 1975) is an American television animation producer, director, animator, comic book artist, writer, character designer, and storyboard artist, based in Meguro, Tokyo.

His recent projects include the Netflix original, animated series, Bass X Machina, Netflix original anime series Yasuke, Cannon Busters, Crunchyroll’s Children of Ether, Black Dynamite for Adult Swim, The Legend of Korra for Nickelodeon, Aaron McGruder's The Boondocks for Sony Pictures Television.

== Early life ==
Thomas was born in South Bronx, New York City in 1975. His older brother caused him to start drawing, and while he was not a good student, his love of drawing kept him "off the streets." As he later recalled, his mother encouraged this interest when she enrolled him in an art-focused high school. His first job, after graduating, was interning at Pyramid, a company that "made children's handbags for projects like Disney's Hercules," with his comics helping him get the job. Afterward, he moved to Greensboro, North Carolina, where met Carl Jones.

== Career ==
=== The Boondocks, BattleSeed, and early career ===
Thomas' contributions as supervising character designer and co-director on seasons 1 and 2 of Adult Swim's animated series The Boondocks, helped the show to be nominated for an NAACP Image Award for Outstanding Comedy Series and win the honorary Peabody Award.

His early production credits include character designer, layout and key animator on Showtime's web series WhirlGirl, and storyboarding for Batman: The Brave and the Bold, and assistant animator for Lizzie McGuire. He was also a storyboard artist for various shows such as Kim Possible for Disney Channel, Daria, Ben 10: Alien Force for Cartoon Network, The Batman, and Green Lantern: First Flight, as well as supervising character designer for Superman/Batman: Public Enemies for Warner Bros. Animation.

Thomas's first production deal was with George Jackson's UBO Network, where he created an animated online series entitled BattleSeed, with Thomas writing, producing, and directed the web cartoon series. He later told The Reporter that the series was "an homage to science fiction writer Octavia Butler," and noted that it "lasted for eight episodes," with the series telling the story of a "teenage African American girl living in the city in the future."

=== Korra and Black Dynamite ===
In 2009, Thomas relocated to Seoul, South Korea, at the request of Korean animation studio JM Animation to be hired in-house as part of the animation production staff, and he lived in South Korea for several years. He was later hired as in-house storyboard/animation production artist at Studio Mir for work on The Legend of Korra for Nickelodeon, where he did work on the first season. Later, Moi Animation studio hired him as a producer and director on several other independent projects, marking him as the first American animator to be hired to work in-house as permanent, independent production staff for animation studios in South Korea. His time in the Korean animation industry was chronicled in a web-documentary he produced and directed called Seoul Sessions. Thomas later spoke at the 5th annual TEDx in Incheon, South Korea, about his journey and the importance of "Successful Failures".

In 2011, Thomas worked on Black Dynamite for Adult Swim, and stated it was the only reason he returned to the U.S. during production. He was creative producer and supervising director for Season 1 and supervising director in Season 2.

=== Cannon Busters ===
In November 2014, Thomas crowd-funded an animated TV series pilot called Cannon Busters: The Animated Series, based on his creator-owned comic book of the same name, featuring production by Japanese anime studio Satelight. The project was successfully funded in December 2014 and was released to limited audiences July 8, 2016.

The series was later acquired by the video streaming company Netflix in August 2017, then co-produced by Satelight and Japanese anime studio Yumeta Company as a 12-episode mini-series. It was originally set for a March 2019 release and launched for streaming in August 2019. A Blu-ray was released in 2021.

=== Children of Ether and Yasuke ===
In October 2016, Thomas partnered with Crunchyroll for a deal to co-produce an animated short film, Children of Ether. The film was released in 300 theaters on July 26, 2017 as part of Crunchyroll's Anime Movie Night event, and on-platform shortly afterwards. Thomas later revealed that Netflix wouldn't finance the film because he wanted to keep the intellectual property rights.

On November 8, 2018, Netflix announced Yasuke, an anime original fantasy series created, directed and executive-produced by Thomas. It is inspired by the historical African samurai Yasuke who served Oda Nobunaga in the late 1500s, with actor Lakeith Stanfield voicing Yasuke, and artist Flying Lotus not only working on the music but serving as co-executive producer. Animation production was handled by Japanese animation house, MAPPA and the series was released on April 29, 2021.

=== Japan Society, Bass X Machina, and Sentinel 6 ===
Thomas has worked with the Japan Society in New York City, along with co-producing partner, The Japan Foundation, for the interview series "Foreign Exchange", which Thomas hosts. In combination with the interviews, Japan Society's film side has shown retrospective screenings of influential anime films, generally of the same industry professionals being interviewed.

Thomas created Bass X Machina, a sci-fi steampunk western adult animated series, and serves as executive producer, with the series scheduled for release on November 3, 2026. Some reviewers directly pointed to Thomas's role in the series, noting his prior work, with Collider saying that his "approach to Black history may be unorthodox, but it adds real variety to the types of Black stories told on screen."

In October 2026 it was announced that Thomas served as the writer of a pilot for Sentinel 6, described as an "Afro-futurist sci-fi adventure", and consulting producer on the project, with Michael Carter-Williams and Jamaal Williams as executive producers for the series. There were reports that the series would have "11 to 12 thirty-minute episodes," with animation production by Creative Freaks.

== Comic books and graphic novels ==
Thomas is a comic book artist, with work on such titles as Arkanium, and Teenage Mutant Ninja Turtles. His books include sketch bible Nervous Breakdowns: The Art of LeSean Thomas Vol. 1. He has released the artbook Midnight Marauder: The Art of LeSean Thomas Vol. 2 and Cannon Busters, a creator-owned graphic novel.
