= Bass X Machina =

2026 animated television series

- Genre: Steampunk; Western; Science fiction; Supernatural
- Created by: LeSean Thomas
- Voices of: Brian Tyree Henry; Tati Gabrielle; Cree Summer; Nick Thurston; Janelle Monáe; Chaske Spencer; Currie Graham; Starletta DuPois
- Opening theme: Janelle Monáe ("HONOR KiLLING")
- Composers: Roman GianArthur; Nate Wonder
- Countries of origin: South Korea; United States
- Original language: English
- No. of seasons: 1
- No. of episodes: 6

Production
- Executive producers: LeSean Thomas; Brian Tyree Henry; Han Kwang Il; Chad Handley; Jennifer Wiley-Moxley
- Running time: 29–40 minutes
- Production companies: Studio Mir; Marita Dr Productions

Original release
- Network: Netflix
- Release: November 3, 2026

Bass x Machina is an adult animated steampunk Western television series created by LeSean Thomas for Netflix with Brian Tyree Henry voicing the titular Bass Reeves. Animation services were produced by Studio Mir, with Thomas, Henry, Han Kwang Il, Jennifer Wiley-Moxley, and Chad Handley serving as executive producers. The six-episode series premiered on November 3, 2026.

== Synopsis ==
In a lawless Steampunk West overrun by brutal outlaws, machines, and supernatural terrors, a father is forced to become judge, jury, and executioner — knowing that every act of justice meant to protect his family may ultimately cost him the very people he's fighting to save.

— Animation Magazine

== Cast and characters ==
- Brian Tyree Henry as Bass Reeves, the title character, an infamous bounty hunter and Civil War veteran who has a robotic arm
- Tati Gabrielle as Dana Starr, a 14-year-old aspiring teenage engineer who joins Bass on a journey to find her missing uncle
- Cree Summer as Ahni, one of the Holy People, mystics who possess elemental-based powers. She has lightning-based abilities.
- Nick Thurston as Dr. Eugene Starr, Dana's uncle and an inventor, who is forced to work for Rivenbark.
- Janelle Monáe as Glory Reeves, the second wife of Bass and mother to their two sons. Monáe also performs the main titles theme, "Honor Killing".
- Carter Young and Kai Price as Bennie Reeves and George Reeves, Bass and Glory's young sons
- Wayne Knight as "Hanging Judge" Parker, the court judge of Central City
- André Sogliuzzo as General Robert Kitts, a high-ranking officer in the United States Army who hires Bass to find Dr. Starr
- Anthony De Longis as Mr. Mason, a man who takes control of the Starr family store after Dana's uncle is kidnapped
- Chaske Spencer as Lighthorse, the sheriff of the Chocktaw nation and an old friend of Bass
- Currie Graham as General Rivenbark, a former Confederate Army officer and scientist who experimented on Bass during the war
- Starletta DuPois as Etta Yellowtail, a grumpy Chocktaw elder and an accomplished engineer who constructed Bass' arm
- Lynette Willis as Mahli, one of the Holy People who can manipulate the element of air
- Anoli Scott as Oka, one of the Holy People who can manipulate the element of water
- Candace Michelle Thomas as Nanye, the first wife of Bass and Ahni's mother. She is also one of the Holy People who can manipulate the element of fire.

== Episodes ==
| No. | Title | Directed by | Written by | Original release date |
|---|---|---|---|---|
| 1 | "Until Then... I'm Bass Reeves" | Kim Dong Wook | Chad Handley and Jada Nation | November 3, 2026 |
Bass Reeves boards a speeding train and shoots his way through several criminals to get one last big bounty that will allow him to retire comfortably with his family. Though he's able to carry their dead bodies back to town, the bounty is a fraction of what he expected, on top of an additional cut for him being a black man. The situation leads him to consider a lucrative job from the "Hanging Judge," Judge Parker, and US Army General Kitts: Enter "The Badlands" and rescue Dr. Eugene Starr, an exceptional engineer who was designing weapons for the Union Army before the Civil War ended, and keep him out of the hands of their enemies. After spending the night with his family and talking with his wife, Bass decides to take the job. Before leaving town, Bass stops at the Starr Hardware Store for supplies, where he meets Dana Starr, Dr. Starr's teenage niece who has been trying to get someone to rescue her uncle without success. Dana resolves to rescue him even if she has to go alone, but Bass does not want her to risk her life. Bass then visits the saloon for some info on Dr. Starr's whereabouts, but is entrapped by several gunmen there, until Dana uses her engineering skills to reprogram the bartending bots to even the odds. With the gunmen neutralized, Bass gets the name of the man who last saw Starr: Bully Shaw. As Bass leaves town, he reluctantly lets Dana accompany him until he can put her on a stagecoach back home. Elsewhere, Dr. Starr tries to escape his pursuers by throwing himself off a cliff instead of continuing to work for them, but one of them manipulates the wind to bring him back.
| 2 | "A Good Way to Catch a Bullet" | Han Seung Woo | Chad Handley | November 3, 2026 |
Bass and Dana enter The Badlands and go into Choctaw territory, where Bass is greeted by the Choctaw sheriff and old friend Lighthorse, who reveals he too is looking for Bully Shaw for killing an Indian woman in his territory. So the two race each other into the town of Prosperity to find him first. Bass, getting tired of Dana's constant questions, locks her in a stagecoach and pays the coachman to bring her back home. As Lighthorse and Bass ask around town about Shaw, everyone is either too afraid to answer or actively antagonistic towards them, getting into a large brawl. Dana breaks out of the stagecoach when she witnesses Shaw's posse ride into town and shoot their way through Lighthorse's men, and rides back to Prosperity to help Bass, but is shocked when Bass executes one of Shaw's men in front of her to save her life. Eventually, Shaw himself appears, piloting a giant mechanical bull. Dana locates the weak spot of the bull, and despite its speed and power, Lighthorse lures the bull towards him while Bass hits the target, taking it out. With Shaw trapped under the bull, Bass gets him to talk about Dr. Starr's whereabouts, only for Lighthorse to say that he saw Dr. Starr taken to the town of Stillwater. As Bass and Dana follow the lead, Lighthorse secretly takes Shaw to a dark lab where the ex-Confederate officer General Rivenbark saws off his limbs and forces Dr. Starr to graft on mechanical ones. Though Lighthorse says he sent Bass the wrong way, the Rivenbark insists that he kill Bass before he becomes a threat.
| 3 | "That Don't Look Like God" | Park So Young | Chad Handley and Anthony Florez | November 3, 2026 |
| 4 | "This Train's Being Integrated" | Han Seung Woo | Chad Handley and Jada Nation | November 3, 2026 |
| 5 | "I Do What I Have To Do To Survive" | Park So Young | Chad Handley | November 3, 2026 |
| 6 | "If You Want a Country, You Have to Kill For It" | Han Seung Woo | Chad Handley and Anthony Florez | November 3, 2026 |

== Production ==
In February 2026, the series premiere date for the series was announced, as were the voice actors, executive producers, animation studio, and music composers. The series also is inspired by the historical figure, Bass Reeves, who was "one of the first Black U.S. Deputy Marshals west of the Mississippi River." Movieweb said the series is continuing the trend of merging science fiction and Westerns with a "tortured, violent antihero that is sure to capture audiences" and hoped it would lead to "huge streaming success." Janelle Monáe was tapped for the series theme song ("HONOR KiLLING"), while Brian Tyree Henry, LeSean Thomas, Jennifer Wiley-Moxley, and Chad Handley serve as executive producers, and Studio Mir animates the series. Henry later stated he took on the project after being approached by Jermaine Turner, director of adult animated series for Netflix.

In May 2026, at the Annecy International Animation Film Festival, Netflix presented on various anime and anime-inspired series, including Bass X Machina, which was part of panel entitled "Netflix Anime: Bold Stories, Boundless Worlds" at la Salle de la Volière. In August 2026, the series had a panel on the series hosted by Juju Green, for Netflix's upcoming "anime and anime-adjacent programming," at Anime NYC, with Henry talking about the series, calling it the "first anime Black Western," and the cast list noted.

In September 2026, Henry told Polygon that the series doesn't take away from what it means for "a Black man to go across the country being a bounty hunter," what it means for "indigenous peoples to deal with losing their land and being killed," with the series is episodic as viewers are "going on a journey" as he loves "quest anime." He had an active role in the series development, when it came to "voice casting, sound design, and details of Bass' uniform," serving as the one who brought Monáe into the project, and stated his belief that noting that anime music elevates this show. He also told the same publication that anime has become a "deep part" of African-American culture, adding that Black people "really fucking love" anime, and said he had never seen anime with "Black leads or Indigenous leads" like this series, saying his career has been changing these narratives, then "showcasing characters in a completely different way."

== Release ==
On October 14, 2026, a trailer for the series was revealed.

The series premiered on November 3, 2026, on Netflix, as a six-episode limited series.

== Reception ==
=== Pre-release ===
The series was received positively prior to its release. MovieWeb described it as an "enticing genre medley" due to the "star-studded cast," and saying it is "all but guaranteed to be another big hit" for Netflix. FirstShowing.net said that the series is for "anime geeks" and described it as looking "awesome." Bubbleblabber said that the series will have "high-octane battles...set against an original theme song...by Janelle Monáe." Nerdist said the series characters will be "voiced by Black Hollywood royalty." Men's Journal said the series looks "absolutely wild" and called it "one of Netflix's stranger animated gambles this year."

Polygon described the series as a "replacement" for fans of Blue Eye Samurai while blending "Western and Eastern animation tropes," and using Bass as a cyborg to "explore real racial injustice." Collider described the series as an "ambitious" sci-fi series. Reuben Baron wrote, for Anime News Network, that the series "takes a similar steampunk mecha approach to history as...Yasuke" and said it feels "less burdened by importance and questions of historical representation" than Yasuke. Collier Jennings of Collider said that the series may be an "unorthodox approach" to Bass Reeves, but "definitely stands out" from the series Lawmen: Bass Reeves, with "fluid motion and a unique design that keeps the Western aesthetic intact" while predicting that Thomas's involvement will ensure that the series will "stand out among Netflix's anime offerings."

=== Post-release ===
On the review aggregation website Rotten Tomatoes, the series holds an approval rating of 100% based on 13 reviews, with an average rating of 7.9/10. On Metacritic, which uses a weighted average, the series received a score of 82 out of 100 based on 6 critic reviews, indicating "Universal acclaim".
