= Tae Brooks =

American singer-songwriter

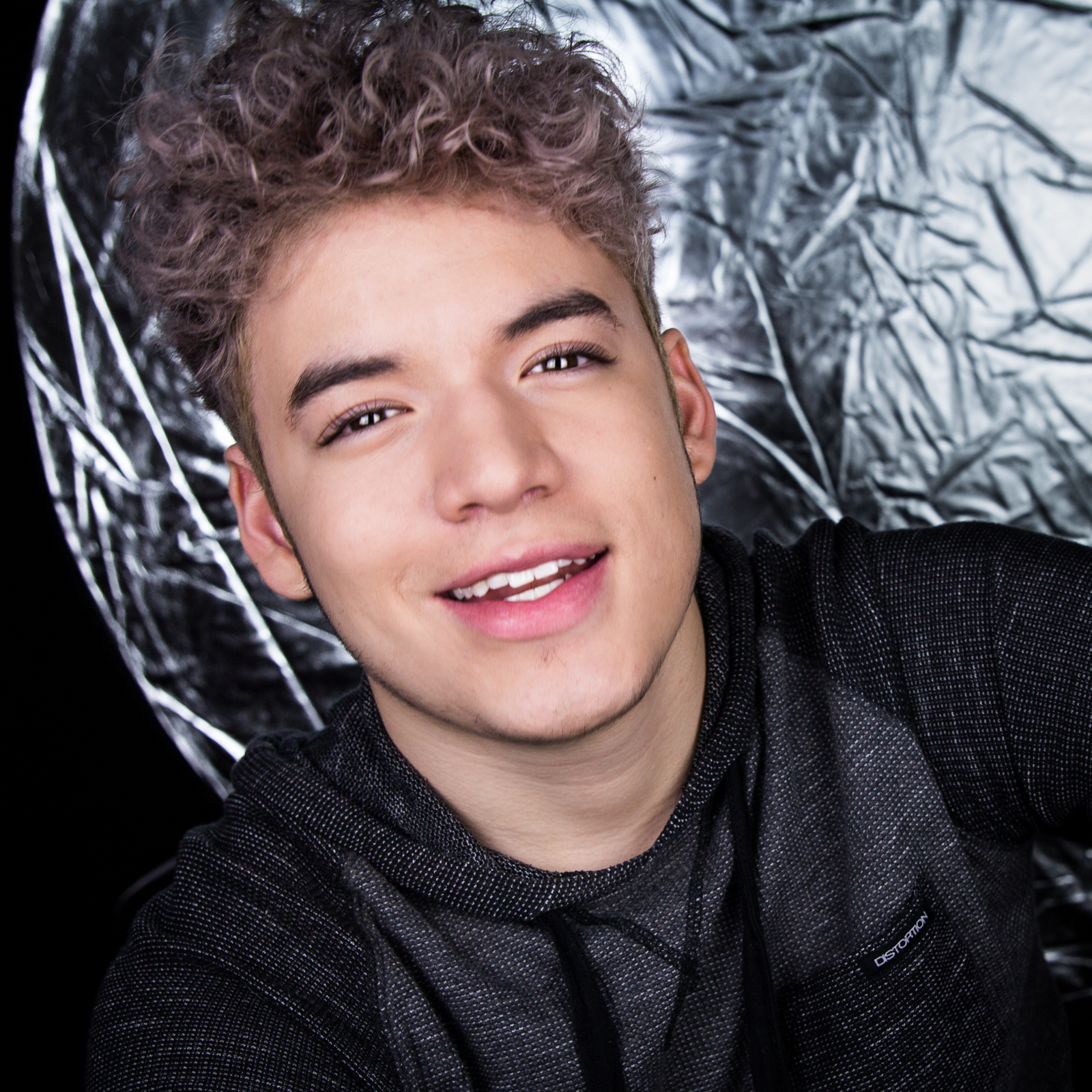
- Tae Brooks in 2016

Background information
- Born: Taelyn Bryce Brooks; October 6, 1997 (age 28); Cincinnati, Ohio, United States
- Genres: Pop, R&B, Soul
- Occupations: Singer, Actor
- Instrument: Vocals
- Years active: 2011-present
- Label: Carriage House Entertainment
- Website: www.taebrooks.com)

Taelyn Bryce Brooks (born October 6, 1997) better known by his stage name Tae Brooks, is an American recording artist, singer, songwriter and actor. Named by Billboard Magazine as #7 and #19 on the Next Big Sound chart, he is known as the voice of Michael Jackson in the animated TV series Black Dynamite. Brooks was born in Cincinnati, Ohio and now resides in Los Angeles.

== Background ==
Tae Brooks was born into a musical family of producers and songwriters and started singing at the age of 10 as a background vocalist on projects in the family garage studio. At a talent audition in 2010 in his hometown of Cincinnati, Ohio, Brooks was recruited by a Los Angeles talent manager which eventually led to the family's relocation. Tae’s brother, Tadjh Brooks (BeatsByiTALY), stepped into the role of lead producer and engineer, and Tae officially started his music career.

Brooks’ YouTube music channel was launched in March 2011 and by April was awarded #57 most subscribed musician channel. His video content has generated millions of views with a mix of vlogs, web series show, original songs and covers of charting songs.

== Image and artistry ==
Brooks' social presence led to voiceover work, including being the male lead voice of the Disney 365 theme song. Tae Brooks performs the voice and singing role of Michael Jackson in the animated TV series Black Dynamite. Tae Brooks is the voice in the intro/outro on the channel of popular YouTube personality Lamarr Wilson. Brooks caught the attention of Canadian music producer and casting agent Josh Friesen who introduced him to GrapeSEED, a developer of educational curriculum used worldwide to teach ESL. This developed into a 3-year intermittent working relationship with GrapeSEED on assignment in their Japan studios singing and acting in their multimedia DVD package.

Brooks' covers have gained him notoriety in music circles and propelled him forward as a fan favorite with his fan base calling themselves "The ShawTaes". Billboard Magazine named Brooks as #7 on January 23, 2016 and #19 on July 14, 2011 on the Next Big Sound chart. His cover of Taylor Swift's “We Are Never Ever Getting Back Together” was listed in the top 8 winners in the Perez Hilton "Can YOU Sing?" Competition. In June 2012 The Huffington Post featured his cover of Justin Bieber's “Die In Your Arms” as one of "10 Amazing Renditions". In December 2013 he placed #4 in Ryan Seacrest's Miley Cyrus "Wrecking Ball" Favorite Cover Contest, the youngest artist in the contest. VersedOnline.com named Tae Brooks a 2014 "Breakout Artist to Watch".

Brooks' first original single "Thumbs Up" was released on iTunes February 22, 2011. As of 2014 he has released five singles and an EP through his independent label Carriage House Entertainment. Tae Brooks' single "It's Always Been You" was released on January 2, 2014 ahead of his debut EP On My Own. Tae Brooks was a co-writer on a majority of the tracks for the EP which was released September 30, 2014 entering iTunes Pop charts at #149.

== Personal life ==
Tae Brooks is the son of Tricia and Billay Brooks. He is the nephew of Multi Grammy nominated songwriter/producer Chuck Brooks.

== Awards, features and nominations ==
- 2016: Billboard Magazine – Named Tae Brooks as #7 on the Next Big Sound chart featuring the fastest growing artists across social media
- 2011: Billboard Magazine – Named Tae Brooks as #19 on the Next Big Sound chart featuring the fastest growing artists across social media

== Discography ==
=== EPs ===
| Details | Tracklist |
|---|---|
| On My Own EP: Date released: 30 September 2015; Record label: Carriage House Entertainment | Tracklist: 1. "It's Always Been You" (3:47); 2. "Lois Lane" (3:30); 3. "Gotta Be" (3:51); 4. "The Fire" (feat. Juke) (3:25); 5. "On Your Own" (3:08) |

=== Singles ===
- "Thumbs Up" (February 2011)
- "Dreams Come True" (January 2012)
- "We Stand" TJ Prodigy (feat Tae Brooks) (March 2012)
- "Goodtimes" (October 2012)
- "Be Mine" (January 2013)
- "It’s Always Been You" (January 2014)
- "Serenity" (April 2016)
- "There She Is" (November 2016)
- "Burnout" (April 2017)
- "Miracle" (September 2017)
- "Don't Overthink It" (November 2017)
- "Carry On" (June 2019)
- "Wonder" (November 2019)
- "Guillotine" (February 2020)
- "Games" (March 2020)
- "Been a Minute" Tae Brooks x Sanni (October 2020)
- "Off Track" Sanni x Tae Brooks (October 2020)
- "Happy 4 U (Freestyle)" ft. Sanni (November 2020)
- "Neptune" (December 2020)

=== Music videos ===
| Title | Year | Director |
|---|---|---|
| "Dreams Come True" | 2012 | Tadjh Brooks |
| "We Stand" | 2012 | Shelby Robinson |
| "Goodtimes" | 2012 | Tadjh Brooks |
| "It's Always Been You" | 2014 | Tadjh Brooks |
| "Lois Lane" | 2014 | Tadjh Brooks |
| "Miracle" | 2017 | OddKiddsOut |
| "Don't Overthink It" | 2017 | OddKiddsOut |
| "Carry On" | 2019 | OddKiddsOut |

== Filmography ==
=== Television ===
| Year | Title | Role | Notes |
|---|---|---|---|
| 2011 | Tae Brooks Show | Himself | Web Series |
| 2011 | Disney 365 | None | Male Voice of Theme Song |
| 2012 | Black Dynamite | Michael Jackson | Voice, Singing; Season 1, episode 1 "Just Beat It or Jackson Five Across Yo' Eyes" |
