= GrapeCity =

Japanese software company

- Company type: Private
- Industry: Software services
- Founded: 1980
- Founder: Paul Broman
- Headquarters: Sendai, Japan
- Key people: Paul Broman (Honorary Chairman, Founder); Daniel Fanger (Chairman); Naoyuki Baba (President); Joshua Broman (CCO)
- Products: Developer Tools; School Management System; Education Curriculums
- Services: Information technology consulting Digital Media Production Services
- Website: https://www.grapecity.com/

GrapeCity, Inc. is a privately held, multinational software corporation based in Sendai, Japan, that develops software products and provides outsourced product development services, consulting services, software, and Customer relationship management services. GrapeCity also has established WINEstudios, a media design and digital production facility in Japan.

GrapeCity's major office locations are in the United States, Japan, India, China, South Korea, Mongolia, Vietnam and Albania.

== Corporate history ==
=== Foundation ===
GrapeCity, formerly Bunka Orient Corporation, was founded in Miyagi prefecture, Japan in 1980 by Paul Broman. The company was established to provide software solutions for the emerging personal computer market in Japan.

Paul Broman worked with Daniel Fanger, now Chairman of GrapeCity and Principal of MeySen Academy, and Nobuo Iwasa to turn Bunka Orient Corporation into a software development company.

=== Original products ===
==== LeySer School Management Software ====
The company's first software product was LeySer Services for school management, which Paul Broman used to help run the MeySen Academy and KeiMei Elementary School, which he founded in the 1970s. Having sent some of his teachers to learn programming, he then directed them in creating software to support the accounting and reporting needs of his schools. Later, they sold the software to other schools through what was still known as Bunka Orient Corporation.

==== Localization of Developer Tools ====
The company expanded into a range of other software products and services, beginning by localizing developer tools for the Japanese market, another empty niche they discovered when developing LeySer Services. Beginning in 1993, they grouped these localized tools together and resold them as their Power Tools line.

Localized tools included:

- PowerTCP Tools (1999)
- JClass (2002) and JProbe (2007) Java(TM) Components
- LEADTOOLS Imaging Toolkits
- FarPoint Spread (1999)

=== Timeline ===
Year	Location	Event
1980	Japan	Bunka Orient Company Ltd. founded in Sendai.
1988	China	Xi'an Orient Software established.
1990	Japan	Kantou business office established in Saitama Prefecture.
1993	China	Shanghai Orient established.
1996	India	Bunka Orient India established in New Delhi.
1999	Japan	Kansai business office established in Osaka Prefecture.
2000	USA	Bunka Orient USA established in Seattle.
2000	Mongolia	Bunka Orient Mongolia established in Ulaanbaatar.
2001	Japan	GrapeCity, Inc. formed in Sendai.
2002	global	Bunka Orient renamed GrapeCity.
2003	Japan	GrapeCity headquarters built in Sendai.
2004	Japan	GrapeCity Nagoya business office established in Aichi Prefecture.
2004	Vietnam	GrapeCity Vietnam established in Hanoi.
2005	India	GrapeCity India Noida Complex opens near New Delhi.
2005	Japan	GrapeCity WINEstudios Harajuku established in Tokyo.
2006	Malaysia	GrapeCity Inc. office opened in Selangor.
2006	Australia	GrapeCity Australia established in Sydney.
2006	Japan	GrapeCity WINEstudios established in Sendai.
2008	USA	Acquired Data Dynamics, Ltd., in Columbus, Ohio.
2009	USA	Acquired FarPoint Technologies in Morrisville, North Carolina.
2009	England	Data Dynamics opens West Sussex office.

=== Name change ===
Originally named Bunka Orient Corporation when it was founded in 1980, the company found that its name was often confused with other entities with the same acronym when it expanded into China and India. The company was renamed GrapeCity in 2002.

In 2005, when GrapeCity established a media design and digital production facility, they established WINEstudios.

=== Acquisitions ===
One of the developer tools that GrapeCity localized for Japanese programmers was ActiveReports from Data Dynamics. In addition to localizing the user interface and documentation, GrapeCity performed quality testing for Japanese usage of the product and requested new features. After a long association with the company, in October, 2008, GrapeCity announced their acquisition of Data Dynamics, in Columbus, Ohio.

Another of the developer tools that GrapeCity localized was Spread from FarPoint Technologies. In a similar move, after long association with the company, they announced their acquisition of FarPoint Technologies in Morrisville, North Carolina, September, 2009.

In 2012, GrapeCity also completed the acquisition of ComponentOne in Pittsburgh, Pennsylvania, which includes the developer tools ComponentOne Studio, a .NET tookit for Visual Studio; Wijmo, a set of controls for JavaScript and HTML5, including AngularJS and KnockoutJS; and Xuni, a native mobile control collection for Xamarin.Forms, iOS, WindowsPhone, and Android.

== Divisions ==
=== LeySer School Management System ===
The LeySer school management system division of GrapeCity is responsible for all software and services around managing private educational institutions in Japan. Key modules of the system include accounting, payroll, tuition management and asset management. The software started out in 1980 as a set of accounting tools and over the years has evolved from the earliest MS-DOS version to Microsoft Windows, and today it is a set of software based on the .NET Framework platform.

=== Developer Tools ===
The Developer Tools division is one of the primary business units of the company bringing in roughly 30% of the company revenues. In addition to developing and marketing its own products, in Japan GrapeCity’s Developer Tools division localizes, sells, and supports products made by other software vendors.

In the US and the rest of the world market, since acquiring Data Dynamics and FarPoint, GrapeCity has consolidated its line of developer tools around ComponentOne, FarPoint Spread, ActiveReports, and Data Dynamics Analysis. These products provide user interface, spreadsheet, reporting, and analysis functionality to software developers using the Microsoft platform and developer tools.

=== GrapeCity Global Services ===
The GrapeCity Global Services (GGS) division provides custom software development, outsourced product development, and software implementation consulting services to mid-sized through enterprise-level customers.

Services include ERP (enterprise resource planning), Microsoft SharePoint, business intelligence, eCommerce, trading systems, information portals, inventory systems, supply chain systems, banking systems, (customer relationship management), financial and accounting packages, and workflow management. The GGS division also provides software services and add-on products for CDC Pivotal CRM and Microsoft Dynamics CRM.

The GGS division consists of two geographical business units, one in the United States and the other in China.

=== WINEstudios Digital Media Production and Design ===
The WINEstudios production and design company established by GrapeCity creates features, programs, commercials, music videos, and special presentations. They design computer graphics using CGI applications including Softimage XSI, Autodesk Maya, After Effects, Combustion, and Boujou. WINEstudios also designs corporate logos, brochures, and marketing tools.

The facility has a sound stage, a motion capture studio, a chromakey studio, an editing suite, and an audio suite.

=== GrapeSEED ===
GrapeSEED has its roots in the Miyagi MeySen Academy, a private preschool education organization in Sendai, Miyagi Prefecture, Japan. MeySen is a preschool English education system.

=== ActiveReports Server ===
GrapeCity announced the launch of ActiveReports Server on September 13, 2011. ActiveReports Server is a Web-based self-service reporting solution for business users, enabling them to design and deliver ad hoc reports from within their Web browsers. ActiveReports Server also includes a secure, scalable storage with report scheduling and distribution capabilities and a Web-based management interface for IT administrators. Software developers can use the ActiveReports Server SDK to embed the ad hoc report designer and other features into their own applications.
