= FarPoint Spread =

Computer software

- Developers: FarPoint Technologies, now GrapeCity
- Initial release: 1991
- Operating system: Microsoft Windows
- Available in: English, Japanese
- Type: Business intelligence Spreadsheets Reporting
- License: GrapeCity EULA
- Website: www.grapecity.com/en/spread/

FarPoint Spread is a suite of Microsoft Excel-compatible spreadsheet components available for .NET, COM, and Microsoft BizTalk Server. Software developers use the components to embed Microsoft Excel-compatible spreadsheet features into their applications, such as importing and exporting Microsoft Excel files, displaying, modifying, analyzing, and visualizing data. Spread components handle spreadsheet data at the cell, row, column, or worksheet level.

This article is about the last FarPoint edition of the Spread product line. Spread is now developed by GrapeCity, Inc. Since the acquisition, Spread for Biztalk Server has been removed from the product line and SpreadJS, a JavaScript version, has been added.

== History ==
- 1991 Spread released as a DLL control as the initial product offering from FarPoint Technologies, Inc.
- 1990s
  - Spread VBX released.
  - Spread ActiveX released.
  - These components are now known as Spread COM.
- 2003 Spread for Windows Forms released as a completely new managed C# version prompted by the launch of Visual Studio .NET.
- 2003 Spread for Web Forms (now Spread for ASP.NET) released.
- 2006 Spread for BizTalk released.
- 2009 FarPoint Technologies acquired by GrapeCity.

== Versions ==
- Spread for Windows Forms: 5.0
- Spread for Web Forms: 5.0
- Spread COM: 8.0
- Spread for BizTalk: 3.0
Screenshot of FarPoint Spread for Windows Forms version 5 in Visual Studio 2010.

Screenshot of FarPoint Spread for Web Forms (ASP.NET).

Screenshot of FarPoint Spread COM.

=== Spread for Windows Forms ===
FarPoint Spread for Windows Forms is a Microsoft Excel-compatible spreadsheet component for Windows Forms applications developed using Microsoft Visual Studio and the .NET Framework. Developers use it to add grids and spreadsheets to their applications, and to bind them to data sources. In version 4.0, new cell types were added to display barcodes and fractions, and exports for XML and PDF were added.

=== Spread for ASP.NET ===
FarPoint Spread for ASP.NET is a Microsoft Excel-compatible spreadsheet component for ASP.NET applications. Developers use it to add grids and spreadsheets to their applications,

=== Spread for COM ===
FarPoint Spread 8 COM allows COM and ActiveX applications to incorporate spreadsheet features. In the 1997 book Visual Basic 5 for Windows for Dummies, Wally Wang lists an early version of Spread COM in Chapter 35: The Ten Most Useful Visual Basic Add-On Programs.

=== Spread for BizTalk ===
FarPoint Spread for BizTalk Server allows developers to integrate Microsoft Excel documents into Microsoft BizTalk applications. Spread for BizTalk Server includes two components:

- Spreadsheet Pipeline Disassembler - Parses data from Microsoft Excel (XLS and Excel 2007 XML, CSV, TXT) documents into XML data for processing through Microsoft BizTalk Server receive pipelines.
- Spreadsheet Pipeline Assembler - Assembles data from Microsoft BizTalk applications into Microsoft Excel (XLS or Excel 2007 XML) or PDF documents for transport through Microsoft BizTalk Server send pipelines.

Developers find it a useful tool for organizations with Microsoft BizTalk Server Enterprise Application Integration. Prior to this release, BizTalk users wanting to use Excel data had to manually open the files and copy and paste data between the two applications.

== Features ==
These features are common to all versions.

- Predefined cell types, including:
  - currency
  - date time
  - number
  - percent
  - regular expression
  - button
  - check box
  - combo box
  - hyperlink
  - image
- Formula support, including:
  - cross-sheet referencing
  - over 300 built-in functions
- Import and export:
  - import to Microsoft Excel-compatible files
  - export to Microsoft Excel-compatible files
  - export to HTML files
  - export to XML files
- Design-time spreadsheet designer
- Data-binding with customizable options
- Hierarchical data views, with parent rows and child views
- Grouping of rows or columns
- Sorting by row or column on multiple keys
- Cell spanning
- Multiple row and column headers
- Bound and unbound modes

== Version-Specific Features ==
=== Spread for Windows Forms ===
- Support for Microsoft Visual Studio 2010
- Support for Windows Azure AppFabric
- Integrated chart control
- Custom cell types
- Cell notes
- Child controls
- Splitter bars
- Built-in and custom skins and styles
- PDF export
- Microsoft Excel 2007 XML Support (Office Open XML, XLSX)
- Floating Formula Bar
- Range Selection for Formula
- Automatic Completion (type ahead)

=== Spread for ASP.NET ===
- Support for Microsoft Visual Studio 2010
- Support for Windows Azure AppFabric
- Integrated chart control
- AJAX-enabled
- Support for Open Document Format (ODF) files
- Multiple edits on multiple rows without server round trips
- Client-side column and row resizing
- Load on demand, which loads data from the server as needed for viewing
- Native Microsoft Excel import and export
- In-cell editing
- Multiple edits on multiple rows without server round trips
- Client-side column and row resizing
- Multiple sheets
- Searching
- Filtering
- Validations
- Cell spans
- PDF export

=== Spread COM ===
- Custom cell types
- Cell notes
- Virtual mode for data loading
- Unicode support
- Customizable printing
- Text tips
- Import and export:
  - Microsoft Excel 97
  - Excel 2000
  - Excel 2007 (requires the .NET Framework)
- Enhanced printing
- 64 bit DLL

=== Spread for BizTalk ===
- Integration of Microsoft Excel data into Microsoft BizTalk applications
- Design-time spreadsheet schema wizard and spreadsheet format designer

== Supported document formats ==
- Adobe Portable Document Format PDF (*.pdf)
- HTML Web Page (*.html)
- Microsoft Excel Workbook (*.xls)
- Plain Text (*.txt)
- Comma-Separated Values (*.csv)
- Open Document Format (Spread for ASP.NET)
