= Black Dynamite (TV series) =

2011 American adult animated television series

- Season 1 title card
- Genre: Action-adventure; Action comedy; Black comedy; Blaxploitation; Parody; Satire; Surreal humor
- Based on: Black Dynamite by: Michael Jai White; Byron Keith Minns; Scott Sanders
- Developed by: Carl Jones
- Written by: Carl Jones; Brian Ash; Scott Fuselier; Byron Keith Minns; Scott Sanders; Michael Jai White
- Voices of: Michael Jai White; Byron Keith Minns; Kym Whitley; Tommy Davidson
- Narrated by: Byron Keith Minns
- Theme music composer: Adrian Younge
- Composers: Adrian Younge (season 1); Fatin "10" Horton (season 2)
- Country of origin: United States
- No. of seasons: 2
- No. of episodes: 20

Production
- Executive producers: Jon Steingart; Carl Jones; Jillian Apfelbaum; Brian Ash; For Cartoon Network Studios (season 2): Brian A. Miller; Jennifer Pelphrey; For Williams Street: Keith Crofford; Walter Newman
- Producers: Michael Jai White; Byron Keith Minns; Scott Sanders; Chris Prynoski; LeSean Thomas
- Editor: Felipe Salazar
- Running time: 11 minutes (pilot only); 22 minutes
- Production companies: Ars Nova Entertainment; Titmouse (season 1); N-BOMB SQUAD (season 2); Cartoon Network Studios (season 2); Williams Street

Original release
- Network: Adult Swim Video
- Release: August 8, 2011
- Network: Adult Swim
- Release: July 15, 2012 – January 10, 2015

Black Dynamite is an American adult animated blaxploitation comedy television series developed by Carl Jones for Cartoon Network's late-night programming block Adult Swim. It is based on Ars Nova's 2009 film of same name, although the series follows an alternate continuity. Michael Jai White, Byron Keith Minns, Tommy Davidson and Kym Whitley reprise their film roles as Black Dynamite, Bullhorn, Cream Corn and Honeybee, respectively. Cedric Yarbrough also reprises his film role as the Western-style pimp Chocolate Giddy-Up, along with Jimmy Walker Jr. as the restaurant owner Roscoe and Arsenio Hall as fellow pimp Tasty Freeze.

Black Dynamite was announced shortly after the release of the original film. Its 10-minute pilot was released on Adult Swim Video on August 8, 2011, before premiering on the channel block on July 15, 2012. The series ended January 10, 2015 with a total of 2 seasons containing 20 episodes total.

== Premise ==
The show, set in the 1970s, is predominantly a parody of and tribute to blaxploitation cinema. The show continues the story of Black Dynamite, Bullhorn, Cream Corn, and Honey Bee as they engage in dangerous and over-the-top misadventures sometimes involving celebrities such as Michael Jackson, O. J. Simpson, Bill Cosby, Sidney Poitier, Richard Pryor, Don Cornelius, Dick Clark, Spike Lee, Mr. T, Orphan Arnold, James Brown, Isaac Hayes, Bob Marley, Bo Derek, Rick James, Elvis Presley, Fred Rogers, John Wayne Gacy, J. Edgar Hoover, and many others, as well as Black Dynamite's recurring nemesis, President Richard Nixon, who was also the main villain from the film. The show makes references to the original Black Dynamite film, such as Fiendish Dr. Wu as the leader of a group of ninjas; the show is set before the events of the movie, as some characters from the film who were killed off are alive in the series (notably Bullhorn and Cream Corn). This is reinforced in one episode, where Cream Corn predicts his own future manner of death while in a helicopter.

== Voice cast ==
=== Main cast ===
- Michael Jai White as Black Dynamite, Jim Kelly
- Byron Keith Minns as Bullhorn, Lionhorn, Rudy Ray Moore, Singer, Tuskegee Airman
- Kym Whitley as Honeybee, Tinbee, Old Lady
- Tommy Davidson as Cream Corn, Scarehorn, The Boss Man, Red Light

=== Additional voices ===
- Carlos Alazraqui as Helicopter Pilot
- Tichina Arnold as Tinbee's Singing Voice
- Erykah Badu as Fatback Taffy, Fat Hoe Crow, Rita Marley, Wolf
- Eric Bauza as The Fiendish Dr. Wu, Chinatown Assassin, R.A.C.I.S.T., Sidney Poitier, Dick Clark, Newscaster, Child, Reporter
- Liz Benoit as Foxxy Mama
- Tae Brooks as Michael Jackson
- Corey Burton as Dennis Flynn, Fred Rogers, Phil Drummond
- Chance the Rapper as Bob Marley
- Michael Colyar as Sweet Butter
- Affion Crockett as Joe Jackson
- DeRay Davis as Ninja, Isaac Layes, Ringo Mandingo
- John DiMaggio as Rip Tayles, Female Cop, J. Edgar Hoover, Rump Rangers Human Horse, Various Gay People
- Godfrey as Al Sharpton
- David Alan Grier as The Doctor
- Eddie Griffin as Richard Pryor, Paul Mooney
- Arsenio Hall as Tasty Freeze
- Samuel L. Jackson as Captain Quinton
- Carl Jones as Frank the John, Crenshaw Pete, Puppet Minion, Shark Victim, Stuey Fig Newton, Reverse Strip Club Announcer, The Mayor of Beach City, Teacher, Laughing Prisoner, James Brown, Thick James
- Orlando Jones as Basehead, Flying Junkie, Stuey's Brother
- Rochelle Jordan as Cindy Breakspeare
- Sean Kingston as Dexter, Saint
- Jonathan Kite as Richard Nixon, Henry Kissinger, James Bonds (Sean Connery and Roger Moore), News Reporter, Elvis Presley
- Phil LaMarr as Muhammad Ali
- Lil' Mo as Offscreen Nurse, Horse Carriage Woman, Teacher, Rondell's Mom
- Luenell as Moms Mabley
- Mel B as Connie Lingus
- Hugh Moore as Lamont
- Charlie Murphy as Another Cat Named Rallo, Another Slave Cat Named Rallo
- Tim Blake Nelson as Chief Humphrey Magillahorn, The Wicked Bitch of the West Side, Donald Sterling, Television Executive, Cracker Cop, Adult Film Director
- Georgette Perna as Kids
- Clifton Powell as Crenshaw the Slime, Daddy Dynamite
- Donnell Rawlings as A Cat Named Rallo, A Slave Cat Named Rallo
- Christopher "Kid" Reid as John the John, Sun Tzu, Black Leprechaun, Jamaica Labour Party Member
- Kevin Michael Richardson as Melvin Van Peebles, Don Cornelius, Bill Cosby, Fred Berry
- Eddie Rouse as Spike Lee
- J. B. Smoove as That Frog Kurtis, That Bastard Kurtis, the Frogs of Incense
- Snoop Dogg as Leroy Van Nuys
- Aries Spears as Mr. T, O. J. Simpson
- Cree Summer as Li'l Orphan Willis
- Tiffany Thomas as Li'l Orphan TerRio
- Greg Travis as Ku Klux Klan Grand Wizard
- Tyler, the Creator as Broto
- Waka Flocka Flame as Waka Blocka Blaow
- Jason Walden as Dennis Flynn
- Tionne "T-Boz" Watkins as Pam Grier, Reverse Stripper
- Billy West as MASA Scientist
- Denzel Whitaker as Donald the Accountant, Jermaine Jackson
- Dennis L. A. White as Arnold's Stomach
- Gary Anthony Williams as George Washington Carver III, Radio DJ, Reporter, Howard Cosell
- Debra Wilson as Amazon Moon Bitch Leader, Lil' Orphan Penny, Eartha K.I.T.T., Euphoria, Li'l Orphan Arnold, Li'l Orphan Dudley Li'l Orphan Rodney King, Li'l Rodney Munchkins, Givinya Morehead, Child Services Lady, Hotel Employee, Hoe Crows
- Cedric Yarbrough as Chocolate Giddy-Up

== Production ==
At the time the series released, LeSean Thomas told Carl Jones, "Yo, we got two Black-led animated shows on TV at the same time!" while others made comparisons between Black Dynamite and The Boondocks, which he found unfortunate. He later stated that "mining socioeconomic struggles for dark satire" in series such as Black Dynamite and The Boondocks exhausted him, causing him to lean into "more fantastic escapism" instead.

== Episodes ==
=== Pilot (2011) ===
The pilot episode features only an eleven-minute run time and was released on Adult Swim Video on August 8, 2011, and made its television debut over a year later on September 2, 2012.

Title	Directed by	Written by	Original release date	Prod. code	US viewers (millions)
"Trouble on Puppet Street" "Pilot"	Juno Lee	Carl Jones & Brian Ash	August 8, 2011	101	1.21
Black Dynamite is assigned by the CIA to stop That Frog Kurtis (Voiced by J. B. Smoove), a rogue educational show puppet, from executing his diabolical plan of manipulating children on national television. Guest stars: Carlos Alazraqui, Corey Burton, Clifton Powell, J. B. Smoove

=== Season 1 (2012) ===
No. overall	No. in season	Title	Directed by	Written by	Original release date	Prod. code	US viewers (millions)
1	1	"Jackson Five Across Yo' Eyes" "Just Beat It"	Carl Jones & Justin Ridge	Carl Jones & Brian Ash	July 15, 2012	103	1.69
After Cream Corn saves young Michael Jackson (voiced by Tae Brooks) from an assassination attempt (while not helping Black Dynamite and the gang fight a troupe of black ninjas), he and the pint-sized pop star become good friends. However, once Michael gets on Black Dynamite's nerves, Cream Corn leaves, only to be subjected to the physical abuse of Jackson, who they all discover is actually an alien trying to take over the world. Guest stars: Eric Bauza, Tae Brooks, Affion Crockett, DeRay Davis, Denzel Whitaker, Debra Wilson, Cedric Yarbrough
2	2	"Murder She Throats" "Bullhorn Nights"	Carl Jones & Nate Clesowich	Carl Jones	July 22, 2012	102	1.89
Black Dynamite has Bullhorn go undercover in the porn industry as the smooth talking rhyming "Sweet Throat" to investigate a string of murders involving black porn stars. They soon uncover a scheme to stop the world's first interracial porno, but Bullhorn finds the life of celebrity too appealing to help them. Guest stars: DeRay Davis, Tim Blake Nelson, Clifton Powell, Greg Travis, Debra Wilson, Cedric Yarbrough
3	3	"Taxes and Death" "Get Him to the Sunset Strip!"	Carl Jones & Justin Ridge	Brian Ash & Carl Jones	July 29, 2012	101	1.74
Upon discovering he owes the IRS $60,000 in taxes, Black Dynamite decides to take on a job and he will soon regret: escorting a drug-addled and emotionally unstable Richard Pryor (voiced by Eddie Griffin) to the Sunset Strip for the biggest comedy performance of his career. Guest stars: Eric Bauza, Corey Burton, Eddie Griffin, Orlando Jones, Denzel Whitaker, Debra Wilson
4	4	"The Dark Side of the Dark Side of the Moon" "A Crisis for Christmas"	Carl Jones & Nate Clesowich	Scott Fuselier & Carl Jones	August 5, 2012	104	1.65
When Black Dynamite discovers he's unliked during Christmas, he discovers that he has to make himself more likeable by emulating the one man who he hates most for stealing his thunder: O. J. Simpson (voiced by Aries Spears). He joins O. J. on a lunar mission, but when O. J. bails at the last minute, Black Dynamite is trapped in space just as the rocket explodes in a major malfunction, making everyone believe that he is dead. Guest stars: Myles Brown, Corey Burton, Jonathan Kite, Aries Spears, Billy West, Debra Wilson
5	5	"Panic on the Player's Ball Express" "That's Influenza Sucka!"	Carl Jones & Justin Ridge	Brian Ash & Carl Jones	August 12, 2012	105	1.69
After fighting what he believes to be an attempt to poison all black people, Black Dynamite comes down with the flu on the weekend of the annual Player's Ball, a party for pimps which this year is taking the form of a costume party on a cross-country train. However, Leroy Van Nuys (voiced by Snoop Dogg) hijacks the train in his attempt to take revenge on pimp-kind. With the help of the spirit of Sun Tzu (voiced by Christopher "Kid" Reid), Black Dynamite must fight the flu and a horde of Isaac Washington robots to save his friends and pimps from all over the world. Guest stars: Arsenio Hall, Jonathan Kite, Tim Blake Nelson, Christopher "Kid" Reid, Snoop Dogg, Debra Wilson, Cedric Yarbrough
6	6	"The Shit That Killed the King" "Weekend at Presley's" "Elvis Was a Hero to Most"	Carl Jones	Scott Sanders & Carl Jones	August 19, 2012	107	1.454
President Nixon (voiced by Jonathan Kite) tries to destroy Black Dynamite by flooding the Black Community with cheap drugs, turning everyone into junkies, but fails and the Black Community flourishes to the White Community. To get his way, Nixon sends in Elvis Presley (also voiced by Kite) to take charge, but even The King realizes he has been wrong. In a parody of Weekend at Bernie's, Elvis apparently dies of natural causes and Black Dynamite and the gang must get him back to Graceland before his death can be blamed on anyone and everyone, in the black community. Guest stars: Arsenio Hall, Orlando Jones, Jonathan Kite
7	7	"Flashbacks are Forever" "Apocalypse, This!" "For the Pity of Fools"	Jong-Sik Nam & Carl Jones	Michael Jai White & Carl Jones	August 26, 2012	108	1.568
Black Dynamite and the gang are assigned by the CIA to go to Vietnam to stop his former comrade Laurence Tureaud (voiced by Aries Spears) from restarting the Vietnam War, but his flashbacks from the war nearly kill his friends. Guest stars: Eric Bauza, Corey Burton, Jonathan Kite, Aries Spears, Debra Wilson
8	8	"Honky Kong!" "White Apes Can't Hump"	Jong-Sik Nam & Carl Jones	Carl Jones & Brian Ash	September 9, 2012	109	1.423
Black Dynamite, Bullhorn and Cream Corn brings Honey Bee to the circus to appreciate her a bit more, but in a parody of King Kong, a giant white gorilla falls in love with Honey Bee and abducts her. Now BD must save Honey Bee from Honky Kong before child service comes! Guest stars: Orlando Jones, Jonathan Kite, Charlie Murphy, Donnell Rawlings, Debra Wilson
9	9	"The Race War!" "Big Black Cannon Balls Run!"	Carl Jones & Nate Clesowich	Byron Keith Minns & Carl Jones	September 16, 2012	106	1.637
Black Dynamite represents the Black Community in a multiracial cross-country race and is reunited with his former talking car "Eartha K.I.T.T." (a parody of Eartha Kitt and KITT voiced by Debra Wilson), unaware that he is a pawn in yet another one of Fiendish Dr. Wu's diabolical schemes of world domination. Guest stars: Eric Bauza, Phil LaMarr, Gary Anthony Williams, Debra Wilson
10	10	"Father is Just Another Word for Mother Fucker" "That Seed of Kurtis"	Kalvin Lee	Carl Jones	September 23, 2012	110	1.453
After the events of "Pilot or Trouble on Puppet Street", the son of That Frog Kurtis, That Bastard Kurtis (voiced by J. B. Smoove), enacts his revenge plan on Black Dynamite for killing his daddy on national television. Meanwhile, Black Dynamite finally finds his long-lost father (voiced by Clifton Powell) and struggles to rebuild their relationship. Guest stars: Arsenio Hall, Clifton Powell, J. B. Smoove, Debra Wilson

=== Season 2 (2014–15) ===
No. overall	No. in season	Title	Directed by	Written by	Original release date	Prod. code	US viewers (millions)
11	1	"Roots: The White Album" "The Blacker the Community, the Deeper the Roots!" "Those Cotton Pickin' Crackers"	Carl Jones & ByungSan Park	Carl Jones	October 18, 2014	TBA	0.966
When ROOTS (the miniseries) hits the air and the Black Community finally sees just how bad slavery was, Al Sharpton (voiced by Godfrey) whips everyone into a reparation frenzy and they storm Beverly Hills and Beverly Hills Adjacent for the big payback on black slavery by enslaving every white honky cracker they can find! But Black Dynamite sees that since you can't even keep white slaves alive without caviar and arugula, being slave masters is actually bringing the Black Community down. Is Black Dynamite actually going to fight for the White Man's freedom? Guest stars: Eric Bauza, Michael Colyar, Godfrey, Orlando Jones, Jonathan Kite, Debra Wilson, Cedric Yarbrough
12	2	"Black Jaws!" "Finger Lickin' Chicken of the Sea"	Carl Jones	Hugh Moore & Carl Jones	October 25, 2014	TBA	1.067
A soul food-eating contest gets everyone in the Black Community down to the summer's biggest funkiest most blackest beach party ever called Blaqua Party. But the party already jumped the shark when a giant shark jumps out and starts eating black people! Captain Quinton (voiced by Samuel L. Jackson), the local old, eyepatched, shark-hunting mysterious motherf**ker tells Black Dynamite this isn't just Jaws, it's Black Jaws. All Black Dynamite has to do is swim out there and kill that shark, but wait, what? Black Dynamite can't swim? Oh, crap, this might be a real problem! Guest stars: Eric Bauza, Samuel L. Jackson, Orlando Jones, Jonathan Kite, Lil' Mo, Charlie Murphy, Donnell Rawlings, Debra Wilson
13	3	"The Mean Queens of Halloween" "Warriors Come Out"	Carl Jones	Scott Sanders & Carl Jones	November 1, 2014	TBA	0.951
It's Halloween in LA and Cream Corn convinces Black Dynamite and the Crew to go to a street party where, let's just say, ain't nobody in the closet. Everything's gay (as in happy) and gay (as in gay) until Rip Tayles (voiced by John DiMaggio) is assassinated in front of everyone! The unseen shooter frames Black Dynamite and the Crew, and now they're on a run for their lives, trying to clear their name, pursued by every gay gang south of West Hollywood! Guest stars: John DiMaggio, Orlando Jones, Lil' Mo, Gary Anthony Williams, Debra Wilson
14	4	"How Honeybee Got Her Groove Back" "Night of the Living Dickheads"	Carl Jones	Ian Edwards	November 8, 2014	TBA	0.727
With all the orphans away at orphan camp, a busted-up Whorephanage needs repairs and busted-up whores need a vacation, so Honey Bee takes the harem to Jamaica for R&R. The hoes party to their heart's content, and a disinterested Honey Bee gets her groove back when she meets the one and only Bob Marley! Back at the Whorephanage, all the sex-starved johns turn into horny zombies trying to hump their way into the building, but Honey Bee couldn't care less, she's not coming home! Bob Marley (voiced by Chance The Rapper) could be her happily ever after if not for all these assassins with machine guns constantly trying to kill them! Guest stars: Erykah Badu, Chance the Rapper, David Alan Grier, Rochelle Jordan, Sean Kingston, Mel B, Christopher "Kid" Reid, Debra Wilson
15	5	"Sweet Bill's Badass Sing-Along Song" "Bill Cosby Ain't Himself"	Carl Jones	Byron Keith Minns & Carl Jones	November 15, 2014	207	0.904
When Black Dynamite's old buddy, maverick Sweet Sweetback filmmaker Melvin Van Peebles (voiced by Kevin Michael Richardson), gears up to shoot his next blaxploitation movie in the Black Community called Blackity BlackBlackBlack, everyone's excited to help out except Bill Cosby (also voiced by Richardson)! Desperate for positive black images, Bill Cosby kidnaps the entire all-star cast and tries to brainwash them into besweatered, upstanding representatives of the black race! While Bullhorn, Cream Corn, and Honey Bee fill-in for the talent and try to keep the film afloat, Black Dynamite must track down the pudding-pop-pusher himself and save all of black film history! Guest stars: Eric Bauza, Orlando Jones, Luenell, Kevin Michael Richardson, Eddie Rouse, Tionne "T-Boz" Watkins Note: This is Eddie Rouse's last television role before his death on December 7, 2014. Note #2: This episode was released 30 days after Hannibal Buress's stand-up routine on October 16, 2014.
16	6	"Please Don't You Be His Neighbor" "Mister Rogers' Revenge"	Carl Jones	Scott Fuselier	November 22, 2014	202	1.003
On the Orphans' collective birthday, Black Dynamite brings them all to a show taping with their favorite TV white man, Mister Rogers (voiced by Corey Burton). Now, you'd think that Fred Rogers was never a trained Special Forces killer and that he would definitely not kidnap all the Orphans in a deranged attempt to protect them from evil TV executives and that's exactly what doesn't not happen! With the cops outgunned and the Orphans behind guerrilla defenses, it's up to Black Dynamite to invade that neighborhood and face off with Mister Rogers himself! Guest stars: Eric Bauza, Corey Burton, Jonathan Kite, Lil' Mo, Tim Blake Nelson, Waka Flocka Flame, Debra Wilson
17	7	"American Band Standoff" "The Godfather of Soooul Train" "Get on Your Goodfellas"	Carl Jones	Michael Jai White & Carl Jones	November 29, 2014	204	0.889
Cream Corn is excited as hell at getting a chance to dance on Soooooooul Train, the hippest trip in America, but Black Dynamite knows the truth that the music game is a vicious battle to-the-death between the Godfather Don Cornelius (voiced by Kevin Michael Richardson) and murderous Dick Clark of American Bandstand (voiced by Eric Bauza). Cream Corn becomes a Soul Train dancer and Don Cornelius' old muscle Black Dynamite sees that just when he thought he was out…they pull him back in. Guest stars: Eric Bauza, Orlando Jones, Kevin Michael Richardson, Debra Wilson
18	8	"The Hunger Pang Games" "Diff'rent Folks, Same Strokes"	Carl Jones	Jason Van Veen & Carl Jones	December 6, 2014	TBA	0.960
Child Services is finally on to the Whorephanage and slaps them with a shutdown notice! But it's okay, because rich white Mr. Phil Drummond and his rich white friends (all voiced by Corey Burton) adopt all the orphans at once and whisk them off to a luxury high-rise in the sky. Just as Black Dynamite comes to terms with no longer having the Orphans around, he learns that luxury skyscraper is actually a deathmatch arena where the Orphans fight each other to the death for food! He's got to put an end to these Hunger Pang Games, no matter how popular they are! Guest stars: Erykah Badu, Corey Burton, Lil' Mo, Cree Summer, Dennis L. A. White, Debra Wilson
19	9	"The Wizard of Watts" "Oz Ain't Got Shit on the Wiz"	Carl Jones	Carl Jones & Byron Keith Minns	January 10, 2015	TBA	1.014
20	10	"The Wizard of Watts" "Oz Ain't Got Shit on the Wiz"	Carl Jones	Carl Jones & Byron Keith Minns	January 10, 2015	TBA	1.014
In this hour-long musical finale episode, Black Dynamite's one day off couldn't be more work—everyone needs his help AND a riot blows up. A brick to the head sends BD hallucinating into the Magical Land of Oz-Watts, a trippy technicolor world where…everyone needs his help! Between getting Scarecorn some game, Lionhorn a muzzle and the Tin Bee a set of balls, BD has to fight off the Wicked Bitch of the West Side and reach the Great and Powerful Mother#*?@#$%'s palace, or he'll never get home. Guest stars: Tichina Arnold, Erykah Badu, Eric Bauza, John DiMaggio, Orlando Jones, Tim Blake Nelson, J. B. Smoove, Tyler, the Creator, Gary Anthony Williams, Debra Wilson, Cedric Yarbrough

== See also ==
- Black Dynamite
