= Yasuke (TV series) =

2021 original net animation series

- Promotional poster
- Genre: Historical fantasy; Samurai; Science fantasy
- Created by: LeSean Thomas
- Original net animation
- Directed by: LeSean Thomas; Takeru Satō (Note: Credited as Chief Director (演出チーフ).)
- Produced by: Matthew Shattuck
- Music by: Flying Lotus
- Studio: MAPPA
- Licensed by: Netflix
- Released: April 29, 2021
- Runtime: 28–30 minutes
- Episodes: 6
- Manga
- Written by: Satoshi Okunishi
- Published by: Shogakukan
- Magazine: Monthly Big Comic Spirits
- Original run: July 27, 2021 – July 27, 2022
- Volumes: 2
- icon

Yasuke is an original net animation (ONA) series loosely based on the historical figure of the same name, an African warrior who served under Japanese daimyo Oda Nobunaga during the Sengoku period of samurai conflict in 16th century Japan. Created by LeSean Thomas and animated by Japanese animation studio MAPPA, the series stars LaKeith Stanfield as the titular character. The series was released on Netflix on April 29, 2021.

== Synopsis ==
In an alternate-reality 16th-century feudal Japan reimagined with magic and advanced technology, an African man named Yasuke went from being in the service of Jesuit missionaries during the Nanban trade to being a warrior and retainer in the service of Lord Oda Nobunaga. In the year 1582, he witnessed the fall of Nobunaga's forces in battle at Honnō-ji Temple against the army of the Dark General, who serves the demonic warlord Yami no Daimyō. With Nobunaga's death and the defeat of his forces, Yami no Daimyō assumes complete control of the land. Twenty years later, Yasuke tries to put his storied past as a legendary ronin known as the "Black Samurai" behind him and retires as a recluse boatman named Yassan at a remote village. He encounters a singer at a local bar named Ichika and later agrees to take her and her daughter Saki, a sick girl with mysterious magical powers, north to see a special doctor to help with Saki's condition. After an attack by mercenaries who are after Ichika and Saki, Yasuke is tasked with protecting Saki while coming to terms with his past, dealing with would-be conquerors of Japan, and facing dark supernatural elements as Yasuke and Saki find themselves in the middle of a struggle against the forces of Yami no Daimyō.

== Characters ==
Yasuke (弥助)
Voiced by: Jun Soejima (Japanese); LaKeith Stanfield (English)
Once a servant of Jesuits named Eusebio Ibrahimo Baloi and originally of Yao descent, he was named Yasuke upon becoming a samurai under Oda Nobunaga, after which his skill and honor earned much of his lord's favor, despite the discrimination for his skin and distrust for his foreign origin. After serving as Nobunaga's kaishakunin following his defeat at Honnō-ji Temple, he escaped his bondage under the Jesuits and became a recluse working as a boatman ferrying people along the river he resides on. After 20 years in hiding, he reluctantly joins Saki on a quest after the pair cross paths against Abraham and the servants of the Yami no Daimyō.
Oda Nobunaga (織田 信長)
Voiced by: Takehiro Hira (Japanese and English)
The historic warlord of Japan, that nearly succeeded in united Japan under his crest. Just as historically, Nobunaga scoffed at traditions to progress Japan under his rule, even bringing in Yasuke as a retainer. Nobunaga was also unabashed by his romantic love for Ranmaru.
Saki (咲希)
Voiced by: Kiko Tamura (Japanese); Maya Tanida (English)
Ichika's adopted daughter, rescued from Abraham as an infant. She possesses incredible mystical powers with the potential to rival the Yami no Daimyō as the villain's natural counterbalance.
Natsumaru (夏丸)
Voiced by: Fusako Urabe (Japanese); Ming-Na Wen (English)
Described as an onna bugeisha, a lady samurai for Nobunaga, she befriends Yasuke and share a common bond of being considered outsiders by others in Nobunaga's ranks. Natsumaru was revealed to be a member of the Iga clan and also a spy for Hattori Hanzo within Nobunaga's ranks. Despite having an attraction for Yasuke, he discovers her secret and regretfully kills her amid the battle with Hanzo's army.
Ichika (一華)
Voiced by: Rie Tanaka (Japanese); Gwendoline Yeo (English)
A singer at an inn where she meets Yasuke, hiring him to take her and Saki to a doctor upriver.
Morisuke (守助)
Voiced by: Yu Kamio (Japanese); Paul Nakauchi (English)
The doctor who exclusively treats and trains Saki, as he shares similar powers. He was once a samurai in Nobunaga's forces, serving alongside Yasuke. He runs a school mentoring psychics and sees Saki as the chosen one to end the Yami no Daimyō.
Ishikawa (イシカワ)
Voiced by: Eri Kitamura (Japanese); Dia Frampton (English)
An assassin wielding a giant scythe and other knives, working for Abraham to fetch Saki. After aiding Yasuke and Morisuke, she dies when the Daimyō's personal army comes for Saki.
Haruto (ハルト)
Voiced by: Shunsuke Kubozuka (Japanese); Darren Criss (English)
A self-aware weaponized robot with humorous tendencies, working for Abraham to fetch Saki. After Ishikawa's death, he kamikaze strikes the Daimyō's forces in revenge.
Nikita (ニキータ)
Voiced by: Hiroki Nanami (Japanese); Julie Marcus (English)
A Russian Werebear assassin working for Abraham to fetch Saki. After his death, she stops hunting Saki and helps Yasuke at Morisuke's temple. She sacrifices herself to buy time for Morisuke's forces to retreat, and for Yasuke to take Saki elsewhere.
Achoja (アチョウジャ, Achouja)
Voiced by: Kenji Kitamura (Japanese); William Christopher Stephens (English)
An African shaman originally from the Kingdom of Benin, he is hired by Abraham to capture Yasuke to find Saki. After Abraham's death, he and his party take their pay and he also develops a warrior's respect with Yasuke. He aids Morisuke's efforts against a monster of the Daimyō's and is richly rewarded, the only member of his group to survive after the end battle.
Abraham (アブラハム, Aburahamu)
Voiced by: Shigeru Ushiyama (Japanese); Dan Donohue (English)
A priest with mutant powers in service to the Catholic Church, aiming to take Saki to Europe and conquer the continent, then take the Church as its new leader. Yasuke and Saki kill him after both are captured by his hired assassins.
Yami no Daimyō (闇の大名)
Voiced by: Yoshiko Sakakibara (Japanese); Amy Hill (English)
The dark mage who conquered a swath of Japan, who seeks to take Saki's power for herself, seeing her as a natural threat. In the last episode she was identified as Hojo Masako, a noble from Kamakura shogunate.

== Production ==
=== Concept ===
According to series creator LeSean Thomas, he was inspired to learn more about Yasuke, regarded as the first foreign born warrior of African descent in Japanese samurai history, after seeing online images from the children's book Kurosuke by Kurusu Yoshio in 2009. After the success of creating his first animated series Cannon Busters with Japanese animation studios Satelight and Yumeta Company, Thomas was approached by Netflix in 2017 to create future projects for the network. Thomas pitched three ideas to Netflix, with one of them being an action adventure anime series based the story of Yasuke.

Netflix greenlit the project with Thomas serving as showrunner of the series. Instead of a traditional historical anime series, the story was developed as a reimagined take of feudal Japan set in a world of science fiction and fantasy elements, such as magic and mecha, to set it apart from other jidaigeki anime. According to Thomas, he felt restricted in the idea of doing a standard biopic, and he wanted to do a series with a sense of fantasy and romanticism like what was done with other figures in Japanese history, such as Yagyū Jūbei Mitsuyoshi. Nick Jones Jr., a lead writer for the series, has credited works such as Samurai 7, Rambo films, and Lone Wolf and Cub as influences to his writing. The series was developed with multiple seasons in mind.

=== Development ===
First announced in November 2018, Yasuke was developed with a writing team in the United States, and art, character design, and animation in Japan by studio MAPPA. LeSean Thomas, actor LaKeith Stanfield, musical artist Steven Ellison a.k.a. Flying Lotus, and manager/producer Colin Stark are the executive producers of the project with Matthew Shattuck serving as a producer. Both Stanfield and Flying Lotus contributed ideas to the project such as Yasuke's backstory involving trauma and mental health, additional characters for the series, and story elements involving the supernatural. Stanfield voices Yasuke in the English version while Japanese/African American actor and television personality Jun Soejima voices Yasuke in the Japanese version.

Takeru Satō is the chief episode director of the series with Satoshi Iwataki as chief animation director, Junichi Higashi as art director, Yuki Nomoto as the director of 3DCG, and Hyo-Gyu Park as director of photography. The character designs for the series were created by director and animator Takeshi Koike with Kenichi Shima serving as sub character designer. Recording for the English cast was done at recording studio NYAV Post in New York City.

Following the series conclusion, Flying Lotus said that the series served as "introduction to this world" and added "we have big plans for Yasuke. It's just the beginning."

=== Music ===
In addition to serving as an executive producer and as part of the creative team, Flying Lotus also composed the soundtrack for the series. "Black Gold", written and produced by Flying Lotus and performed by Thundercat, is the opening theme for the series, and the ending theme is "Between Memories" by Flying Lotus, featuring Niki Randa and Thundercat. Each theme was featured in five of the six episodes. Instead of going for a more straightforward hip-hop or jazz focused soundtrack like Samurai Champloo and Cowboy Bebop, Flying Lotus went for an organic take with the music being made in chronological order to reflect the main character's progression in the story. Flying Lotus stated that he went for a more synthesizer-inspired sound mixed with Japanese percussion, African percussion, and hip-hop elements.

=== Manga adaptation ===
A manga adaptation by Satoshi Okunishi was serialized in Shogakukan's seinen manga magazine Monthly Big Comic Spirits from July 27, 2021, to June 27, 2022; An additional chapter was published on July 27 of the same year. Shogakukan collected its chapters in two tankōbon volumes, released on July 29 and September 30, 2022.

== Episodes ==
No.	Title	Directed by	Written by	Storyboarded by	Original release date
1	"Ronin"; Transliteration: "Rōnin" (Japanese: 浪人)	Takeru Satō	Nick Jones Jr. Story by : LeSean Thomas, Flying Lotus, Nick Jones Jr.	Takeru Satō	April 29, 2021
20 years after the fall of Oda Nobunaga, Yasuke travels with Ichika and her daughter Saki to take the girl to a special doctor. Yasuke recalls the time he was recruited by Nobunaga. On their journey they are attacked by a group of mercenaries sent by the daimyo to capture Saki for her special powers.
2	"The Old Way"; Transliteration: "Inishie Yori Tsuzuku Michi" (Japanese: 古より続く道)	Yasufumi Soejima	Nick Jones Jr. Story by : LeSean Thomas, Flying Lotus, Nick Jones Jr.	Hiroshi Kobayashi	April 29, 2021
With Ichika gone, Yasuke and Saki return to the village with the mercenaries in pursuit. Yasuke remembers his service to Nobunaga in his goal to unify Japan. Yasuke is soon overwhelmed by the mercenaries after he refuses to hand over Saki.
3	"Mortal Sins"; Transliteration: "Taizai" (Japanese: 大罪)	Kunihiro Mori; Shinpei Kamata (Note: Nightmare Sequence)	Alex Larsen; Story by : LeSean Thomas, Flying Lotus, Alex Larsen	Satoshi Iwataki	April 29, 2021
Yasuke is falsely accused of murdering Ichika and being held and tortured by Abraham, while Saki is being tracked down by Nikita and Haruto. Saki's power grows and she manages to aid Yasuke and kill Abraham.
4	"The Long Road"; Transliteration: "Hatenaki Michi" (Japanese: 果てなき道)	Hiroyuki Kanbe	Alex Larsen; Story by : LeSean Thomas, Flying Lotus, Alex Larsen	Masahiro Andō	April 29, 2021
On their journey to Dr. Morisuke, Saki and Yasuke encounter a band of warriors and their powerful leader lieutenant Kurosaka. A decisive battle ends with Kurosaka getting stabbed in the chest. After leaving Saki in Dr. Morisuke's care, Yasuke goes on his own way.
5	"Pain & Blood"; Transliteration: "Itami to Chi" (Japanese: 痛みと血)	Kazuya Iwata	Nick Jones Jr. Story by : LeSean Thomas, Flying Lotus, Nick Jones Jr.	Ken'ichi Suzuki	April 29, 2021
Yasuke battles the dark general Mitsuhide, while Dr. Morisuke helps Saki to be free of the Daimyo's dark influence. As dark army steps up their attack, the mercenaries intervene. However a larger dark army advances, wiping out most of the mercenaries and forcing Dr. Morisuke's forces to retreat to the temple.
6	"Balance"; Transliteration: "Chōwa" (Japanese: 調和)	Takeru Satō	Alex Larsen; Story by : LeSean Thomas, Flying Lotus, Alex Larsen	Takeru Satō	April 29, 2021
As Dr. Morisuke holds back the dark army, Yasuke and Saki infiltrate the Dark Castle. Yasuke falls under the Daimyo's hallucinogenic magic until Saki snaps him out of it. Together the two friends destroy the Daimyo.

== Soundtracks ==
=== Yasuke (2021) ===
Yasuke

Soundtrack album by Flying Lotus
- Released: April 30, 2021
- Genres: Hip-hop, instrumental hip-hop, electronic music, experimental music
- Label: Warp
- Producer: Flying Lotus

Flying Lotus chronology
Flamagra (2019)	Yasuke (2021)	Spirit Box (2024)

Yasuke is the soundtrack album and original score by Flying Lotus, created for the series. It was released on April 30, 2021, through Warp Records and features appearances by Thundercat, Denzel Curry, and Niki Randa.

Track Listing
No.	Title	Length
1.	"War at the Door"	2:07
2.	"Black Gold" (featuring Thundercat)	1:35
3.	"Your Lord"	2:06
4.	"Shoreline Sus"	1:20
5.	"Hiding in the Shadows" (featuring Niki Randa)	1:01
6.	"Crust"	2:13
7.	"Fighting Without Honor"	1:54
8.	"Pain and Blood"	1:24
9.	"War Lords"	1:24
10.	"Sachi"	1:25
11.	"Your Screams"	2:18
12.	"Using What You Got"	1:05
13.	"African Samurai" (featuring Denzel Curry)	1:54
14.	"Where's the Girl?"	0:40
15.	"Kurosaka Strikes!"	1:19
16.	"This Cursed Life"	1:27
17.	"RoBomb"	1:05
18.	"Taiko Time // Sacrifice"	1:21
19.	"Your Day Off"	1:33
20.	"Your Armour"	2:20
21.	"Enchanted"	1:26
22.	"Mind Flight"	2:53
23.	"Survivors"	1:17
24.	"Your Head // We Won"	1:24
25.	"The Eyes of Vengeance"	2:59
26.	"Between Memories" (featuring Niki Randa and Thundercat)	1:45
Total length:		43:15

Japanese edition bonus track
No.	Title	Length
15.	"When It Dies"	0:56

=== Charts ===
Chart performance for Yasuke
Chart (2021)	Peak position
Belgian Albums (Ultratop Flanders)	71
German Albums (Offizielle Top 100)	78

== Critical reception ==
Metacritic, which uses a weighted average, assigned the series a score of 72 out of 100, based on 9 critics, indicating "generally favorable" reviews. On Rotten Tomatoes, 93% of 27 ratings are positive, and the average rating is 6.60/10 garnering the series critical praise. The consensus for the series states: "Anchored by an impressive voice cast led by a solid LaKeith Stanfield, Yasuke's expertly crafted, gorgeously animated blend of fantasy and history is an epic ode to the titular samurai."

The series received mixed reviews from some critics. James Poniewozik praised both the animation and score, but argued that "the quieter and more novel aspects... get drowned out by its louder, less distinctive action story lines." He also described the series as an "artful genre mash-up", said it has colorful villains, and stated there is "untapped potential" in the history of the protagonist or in alternative history. Melanie McFarland of Salon called the story "fantastical" and a project "closer to the heart" than other media LeSean Thomas worked on, but needs more time to tell the story than is allotted in six episodes. Nick Valdez of ComicBook.com said the series has a talented team behind it, is a fun "blend of realism and kooky fun", and praised the show's music, while criticizing the series for covering too much ground in six episodes, with "two-arc anime condensed into a single arc's time". Toussaint Egan of Polygon said the series delivered on an "expansive promise" with a protagonist whose personality and history hint to the "expansive multiplicity of the Black experience as a whole", added that although there isn't much space to explore the character's stories, this is the exception for Yasuke, and called the series "fascinating".

Tyler Hersko of IndieWire argued that the series sidelined a "great" protagonist by including "fantasy nonsense" which leads to confusion, said there is "no thought given to narrative cohesion" in the series, and criticized the series for "lack of attention" to supporting female characters, but praised it for dramatizing important parts of Yasuke's life "that have been recorded throughout history" and having memorable characters. Akeem Lawanson of IGN called the tale "epic", but said that sci-fi elements don't help add depth to the series' characters, only serving as a distraction, and criticized the characters, voice acting, and lack of character development, while praising the visuals for being "quite compelling". Robert Daniels of RogerEbert.com describes the series as a "fever-dream" which blends many elements and results in a "trippy story of regret and tradition" and criticized it for creating "whiplash through...sharp tonal and visual shifts", a convoluted story, but praised it for raising questions "regarding racism and sexism". Kimberly Ricci of Uproxx said the series offers "plenty of substance along with entertainment", praised the interaction between Suki and Yasuke as endearing, visuals, re-imagining the story of a legend, and said it doesn't waste the time of the audience.

== Accolades ==
Year	Award	Category	Nominee(s)	Result	Ref.
2021	53rd NAACP Image Awards	Outstanding Animated Series	Yasuke	Nominated	
2021	12th Hollywood Music in Media Awards	Main Title Theme — TV Show/Limited Series	Yasuke – Flying Lotus and Thundercat	Nominated	
