= GrapeSEED =

GrapeSEED is a research-based oral language acquisition and critical listening program for teachers that allows students to obtain the English language naturally. This natural approach, developed by Stephen Krashen, a linguist and researcher in the fields of second-language acquisition and bilingual education, and Tracy D. Terrell, an education theorist, is intended to give language learners the ability to "communicate with native speakers of the target language" by having students, who are taught in a classroom setting, first comprehend the language, and then "Speech (and writing) production emerges as the acquisition process progresses."

== Research and theories ==
Some of the research and theories that GrapeSEED is based on include the following:

- Functional-notional approach: Mary Finocchario, educator and TESOL president (1970-1971), and Christopher Brumfit, educator, "identify the functional-notional syllabus [from the Council of Europe] as an 'innovative approach' (1983:xi) to language learning and teaching which has as its primary focus the learners and the function or functions of language, that is, the communicative purpose learners wish to express and to understand."
- Natural approach: According to Krashen, language "acquisition is based primarily on what we hear and understand, not what we say," which he defines as comprehensible input. Regarding teaching language acquisition, he believes "The best methods are therefore those that supply 'comprehensible input' in low anxiety situations, containing messages that students really want to hear. These methods do not force early production in the second language, but allow students to produce when they are 'ready', recognizing that improvement comes from supplying communicative and comprehensible input, and not from forcing and correcting production."

The GrapeSEED program involves students participating in a teacher-led classroom where the English language is introduced and learned with materials and activities that focus not on grammar, but on language acquisition, or "'picking-up' a language." With acquisition, "We are generally not consciously aware of the rules of the languages we have acquired. Instead, we have a 'feel' for correctness. Grammatical sentences 'sound' right, or 'feel' right, and errors feel wrong, even if we do not consciously know what rule was violated." This focus on oral language acquisition, paired with critical listening, defined as "the process of analyzing and evaluating the accuracy, legitimacy, and value of messages", is intended to help students first achieve an understanding of the language, and then speak, read, and write it.

The GrapeSEED program is used to teach the English language with children in preschool through second grade, economically disadvantaged students, and English as a Second Language (ESL) students. It includes multimedia materials, teaching manuals and training processes.

GrapeSEED is sold by GrapeCity, inc., a privately held, multinational software corporation based in Sendai, Japan, that develops its own software products and provides outsourced product development services, consulting services, software, and Customer relationship management services.

== History ==
GrapeSEED was created from the idea of Paul Broman Sr., an American missionary who wanted to teach Japanese children the English language after World War II. In 1950, Paul moved to Japan, and along with other families and friends, built a kindergarten school. Established in 1967, this school, located in Sendai, Miyagi Prefecture, Japan, was named Miyagi MeySen Academy and is where GrapeSEED originated.

In 2009, GrapeSEED was introduced in South Korea and as of 2011 "...is already helping their children to learn English, elementary education by introducing such a program in the country in more than 270 kindergartens, children's homes, language schools."

In 2012, GrapeSEED was introduced in the United States at Mars Elementary School in Berrien Springs, Michigan. It is used in the following 16 countries: Albania, Azerbaijan, Brazil, China, India, Indonesia, Japan, Malaysia, Mongolia, Myanmar, Nepal, Russia, South Korea, Thailand, United States, and Vietnam.
