= Carl Henry Jones =

United States Navy admiral (1893–1958)

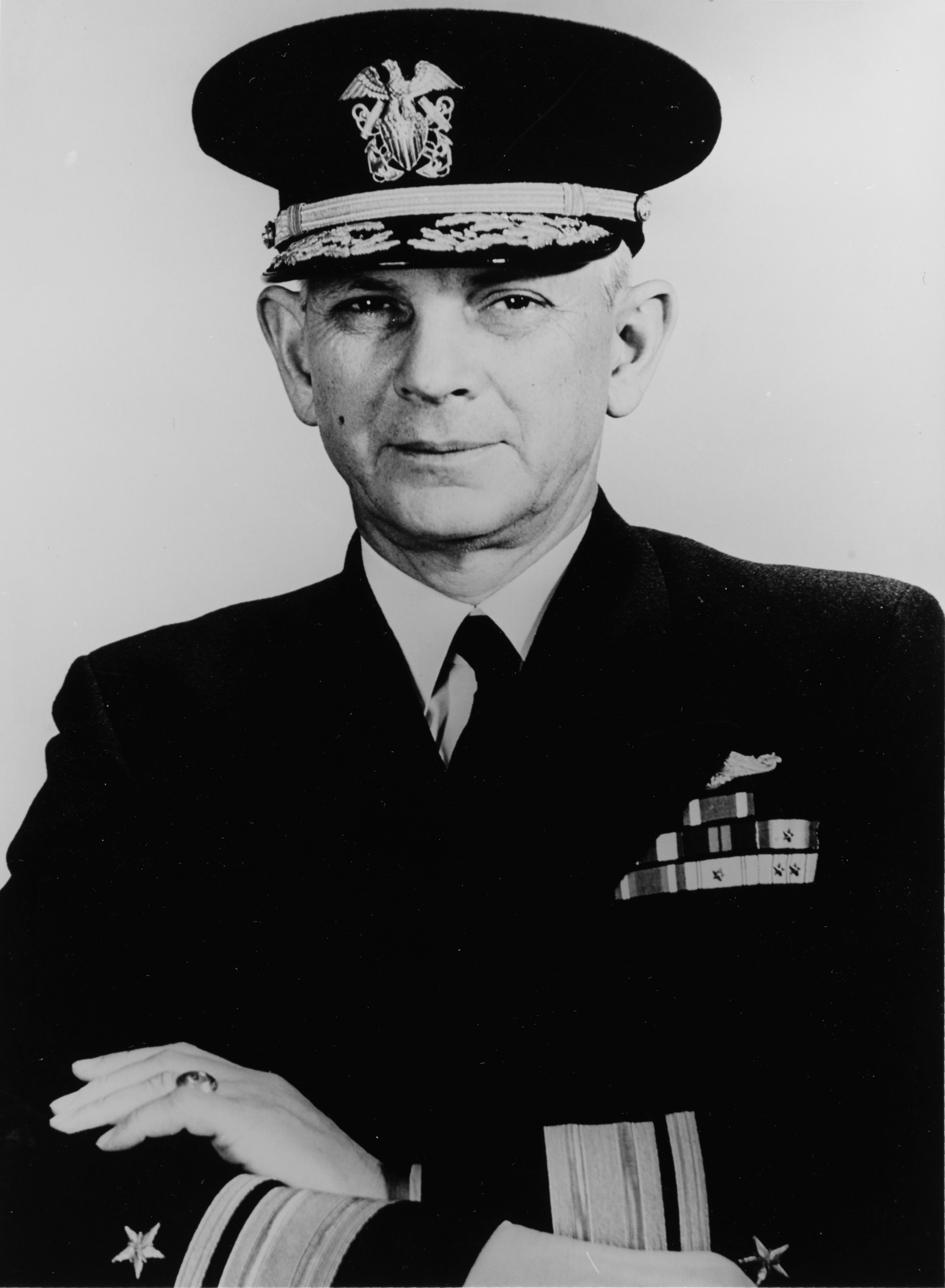
Jones in 1944

Carl Henry Jones (17 June 1893 – 1 September 1958) was a United States Navy admiral.

Born on 17 June 1893 in Jones Mill, Alabama, he died on 1 September 1958 in Annapolis, Maryland.

Raised in Atmore, Alabama, Jones graduated from the United States Naval Academy in 1914 and served in World War I. As a T/Commodore, from 14 Jan 1943 to 15 Dec 1943, Jones was the commanding officer of the battleship USS Maryland in the South Pacific. After participating in the assault and capture during the battle of Tarawa, he was named sub-area commander of the South Pacific based at Tarawa. Rear Admiral Jones last served as commander of the Norfolk Navy Yard from 1944 until his retirement.

He retired in November 1946 and was advanced to vice admiral on the retired list based on his war record.

Jones married Elizabeth S. Dorsey. They lived on Aberdeen Creek in Anne Arundel County, Maryland after his retirement. He died at the Navy hospital in Annapolis and was buried at the United States Naval Academy Cemetery.
