= Cannon Busters =

American fantasy comic book and anime series

- Cover of Cannon Busters #0 (2004). Illustration by Rey.

Publication information
- Publisher: Devil's Due; UDON
- Format: Ongoing series
- Genre: Fantasy
- Publication date: March 2005
- No. of issues: 3

Creative team
- Written by: J. Torres; LeSean Thomas
- Artist: Corey Lewis (issue #0)
- Penciller: LeSean Thomas
- Colorist: James Lewis

Cannon Busters is an American fantasy comic book series by LeSean Thomas, launched in March 2005. An American-Japanese adult animated original net animation (ONA) series by Satelight and Yumeta Company was released on Netflix on August 15, 2019.

== Publication history ==
The first issue of the series was due to be published by Com.x in 2003, but moved to Devil's Due in 2004 and was published in 2005. It was well received by critics and fans, but due to a very busy schedule, Thomas had decided to reprint and continue the series as an original graphic novel. The graphic novel was due to come out in 2009 and it was speculated that it would have featured a number of guest artists. However, the graphic novel has long since been put on hold, presumably cancelled in favor of reviving the project as an animated production. In 2023 on the Netflix website, it is officially confirmed that animator and screenwriter LeSean Thomas returns to the world of his acclaimed original comic.

== Characters ==
Focuses on those featured in the anime, which was not intended to be an exact adaptation. As the anime changed some of the characters' names, they will be listed before the original (in the comics).

=== Main characters ===
- Philly the Kid (フィリー・ザ・キッド, Firī za Kiddo)
  Voiced by: Yoshitsugu Matsuoka (Japanese); Kenny Blank (English)
  An outlaw and the youngest wanted criminal in the western regions of Gearbolt, Philly in the anime is easily annoyed by his situation, but eventually likes the presence of S.A.M and Casey. He accompanies Samberry on her journey. Philly is also an immortal being, with all of his fatal injuries adding a number.
- S.A.M (サム, Samu)/Samberry
  Voiced by: Hinaki Yano (Japanese); Kamali Minter (English)
  A young robot girl who is separated from her owner, Prince Toji. S.A.M. has an optimistic, yet naive outlook and enjoys befriending people. If one of her friends were to be in danger, she transforms into a Cannon Buster.
- Prince Kelby (ケルビー, Kerubī)/Prince Toji
  Voiced by: Junji Majima (Japanese); Zeno Robinson (English)
  The young prince of Botica. Cautious, he was separated from his close friend, S.A.M. when his kingdom was under attack. He had to travel with Odin to Gara's Keep, much to his concern.
- Locke (ロック, Rokku)/Lock
  Voiced by: Nobuyuki Hiyama (Japanese); Billy Bob Thompson (English)
  A very dark, mysterious man who is in search of the Last Heart which will unlock the secret of Gearbolt, and the power of Mora. After Botica was under attack, he took over the kingdom and killed King Bulgher.
- 9ine (ナイン, Nain)
  Voiced by: Yōsuke Akimoto (Japanese); Greg Chun (English)
  An alcoholic rōnin who assists Samberry on her journey to find Prince Toji. He is the most level-headed of the group, but would laze around. In the anime, he was believed to be someone after Philly, but later became allies with him, S.A.M. and Casey for some time.
- Casey Turnbuckle (ケイシー・ターンバックル, Keishī Tānbakkuru)
  Voiced by: Shiori Izawa (Japanese); Stephanie Sheh (English)
  An abandoned assistant and junk mechanic, with an admiration for flying. Casey is optimistic and passionate, that she enjoys looking into whatever mechanism she can find.
- Odin (オーディン, Ōdin)
  Voiced by: Takaya Kuroda (Japanese); Darien Sills-Evans (English)
  A Botican soldier. He leads Kelby and the robot soldiers through their journey to Gara's Keep. The kingdom's situation has led him to feeling solemn, looking out for Botica's young prince.

=== Supporting characters ===
- Hilda (ヒルダ, Hiruda)
  Voiced by: Junko Minagawa (Japanese); Angelique Perrin (English)
  She suddenly encountered Kelby and Odin, seen as an attacker. She was spared and allied with the two of them afterwards, joining them on their way out of Botica.
- Dex (デックス, Dekkusu)
  Voiced by: Mabuki Ando (Japanese); Mela Lee (English)
  A member of the Fraternity, she lacks arms and uses floating prosthetics. Dex is sly and sinister. She involves herself in hand-to-hand combat, with her prosthetic hands being able to have claws.
- Bridge (ブリッジ, Burriji)
  Voiced by: Ayaka Shimizu (Japanese); Marin Miller (English)
  A robot in the Fraternity. She usually has a cold expression and would involve herself in hand-to-hand combat. She also pilots their airship.
- Manic (マニック, Manikku)
  Voiced by: Yuko Īda (Japanese); Kausar Mohammed (English)
  A robot in the Fraternity. Her quirky look contrasts with her condescending energy. She had to fight against 9ine, until he found out she had beer on hand.
- Coin (コイン, Koin)
  Voiced by: Shima Asakawa (Japanese); Angelique Perrin (English)
  The ninja of the Fraternity. She is able to make clones of herself, but Odin was able to find her weak spot and punched the emblem on her headwear. She is the only member who does not speak.
- King Bulgher (バルガー王, Barugā-ō)
  Voiced by: Katsuhisa Hōki (Japanese); John Eric Bentley (English)
  The king of Botica. When Kelby wanted to see the city view, Bulgher worried about his son's whereabouts. He was then approached and held captive by Locke, when his kingdom was under attack.
- 12Welve (トゥエルブ, Tuerubu)
  Voiced by: Rina Kitagawa (Japanese); Sumalee Montano (English)
  A member of the Red Ronin, and a former comrade of 9ine's. It is inferred the two shared feelings towards each other, but their honor and duty keep them going as rōnin.
- Unit6273 (ユニット６２７３, Yunitto 6273)/Victoria
  Voiced by: Ikumi Hayama (Japanese); Marin Miller (English)
  The assistant droid of 12welve, she quickly becomes friends with and dubbed "Victoria" by Casey in episode 21. She mainly accompanied 12welve, but stayed out of a fight between her and 9ine.
- Lady Day (レディー・デイ, Redī Dei)
  Voiced by: Misa Watanabe (Japanese); Debra Wilson (English)
  A very mysterious woman who sits in the shadows, she sent various bounty hunters to target Philly the Kid according to his past life experiences. She only appeared in episode 7.
- Jojo (ジョジョ)
  Voiced by: Tomo Muranaka (Japanese); Melissa Hutchison (English)
  A child who was said to be left alone by his parents, he seemed innocuous unless he was called "short". However, when Casey helped Philly escape afterwards, he reveals his true colors.

== Issues ==
- Cannon Busters #0 (2004, Udon Comics/Devil's Due)
- Cannon Busters #1 (2005, Udon Comics/Devil's Due)
- Cannon Busters #2 (2005, Udon Comics/Devil's Due)

== Animation ==
- Cannon Busters
- Genre: Action, Fantasy
- Original net animation
- Directed by: LeSean Thomas (chief); Takahiro Natori
- Produced by: Fumio Kaneko
- Written by: Matt Wayne
- Music by: Bradley Dennistron; Kevin Begg
- Studio: Satelight; Yumeta Company
- Licensed by: Netflix (streaming); Crunchyroll, LLC. (home video)
- Released: August 15, 2019
- Runtime: 24 minutes
- Episodes: 12

In 2014, LeSean Thomas started a crowdfunding drive through Kickstarter for an animated adaptation of Cannon Busters. Helping with the project were Tim Yoon who worked as a producer for shows and films such as The Legend of Korra and Batman: Under the Red Hood, while comic book artist Joe Madureira who assisted with character designs.

The project was successfully funded in December 2014, with a goal of raising "$120,000 for an eight to ten minute pilot episode," and was released to limited audiences July 8, 2016.

On August 2, 2017, it was announced that Cannon Busters would be released on Netflix. On July 6, 2018, Netflix announced a March 1, 2019 premiere date. However, the series was delayed as it was not included in the Netflix slate for March 2019. On May 30, 2019, British anime distributor Manga Entertainment appointed Reemsborko Ltd as the worldwide agent for Cannon Busters and that the series would be released on Netflix in late 2019. The series was released on Netflix on August 15, 2019. The 12-episode series was directed and written by LeSean Thomas, with Matt Wayne, Natasha Allegri, Anne Toole, Sib Ventress, Martin Pasko, and Nilah Magruder writing scripts alongside Thomas.

Takahiro Natori debuted as a director with the series with LeSean Thomas himself acting as chief director; character designs were handled by Tetsuya Kumagi, and the series featured music composed by Bradley Denniston and Kevin Begg. Satelight and Yumeta Company produced and co-animated the series. Thomas later stated that $8,000 was spent on each episode to ensure that the English dub used union labor.

In mid-December 2020, Sony Music released the series' soundtrack.

On February 16, 2021, Funimation announced they acquired the home video rights to the anime series. It was released on DVD and Blu-ray on May 18, 2021.

No.	Title	Written by
1	"High Risk, Low Reward!"	LeSean Thomas
Gynoid Sam and her robot companion Casey Turnbuckle arrive in Balloon Town, hoping to find notorious outlaw, "Philly the Kid" in hopes that he will escort them to Gara's Keep- the location of Prince Kelby. There, the robot duo come across The Black Claw bounty hunters pursuing Philly, revealed as an immortal with number tattoos for the count of his deaths. As Philly needs an escape, he accompanies the robots with his ride turning into a battle mech, The Raging Bull. But they are then pursued by Royal Hunter Droids, and a chase leads into the canyon where all droids are destroyed, but the trio are trapped in a ravine.
2	"Grifters Gonna Grift"	Sib Ventress
When Philly's car, "Bessie", breaks down on the road, the crew manage to drag the vehicle to an abandoned mining town where a woman, "Mama Hitch", offers to help repair the car with her family. However, Hitch's daughter Serena kills Philly and her boys stun Sam and Casey. Hitch plans to use Philly like she has the last few people who wandered into town: food & clothing. While Sam is unconscious, she dreams of the last night she saw Prince Kelby: on his birthday, the Kingdom of Botica fell to a mysterious enemy force, and she was separated from him, knowing only his destination.
3	"Watch Out for the Wet Spot"	Martin Pasko
Mama Hitch has Serena help her brothers as she works on Philly, who revives and kills Hitch. Serena's brother's ineptitude leads to the two bots managing to escape. When Casey fixes Bessie, she activates Raging Bull Mode to help Philly. As Sam sees Serena hold Philly at gun point, her 'Cannon Buster: Sniper' defense mode activates, killing Serena and destroying the town; Sam shows to retain no memory of her battle mode. Meanwhile, the evil magician reveals his true identity to the captured King of Botica: his forgotten first born son. Learning that Sam is seeking Kelby, the evil magician sends his personal assassin after them. Elsewhere, Captain Odin escorts Prince Kelby through the icy mountains to Valdor on route to Gara's Keep.
4	"9INE"	Ernie Altbacker
As Philly and the gang stop in Happy Lucky Market Town to buy some supplies, Philly sneaks off to a bar where he hears rumors of a famous unstoppable samurai named 9ine; one of the few survivors of a Samurai group. Even though Philly only sees a very drunk man with a sword, he is cut down in under a second, prompting him to get revenge. After 9ine and Philly's group come under fire at once by bounty hunters, they claim the wreckage for parts and 9ine joins them on their journey out of want of free beer. Arriving in Valdor, the city shows signs of withstanding a siege, and despite Kelby's want for rest, Captain Odin forbids him from nearing the city and teaches him how to survive. Elsewhere, The Black Claw are offered to work with Red Horizon, the dark magician's assassins.
5	"21 the Hard Way"	Natasha Allegri
Distracted by berating 9ine, Philly has Bessie break down in a forest and then storms off in anger after everyone eats all his food. After Philly gets lost and trapped in a man-eating plant, 9ine follows Sam and Casey to a nearby town to enjoy the nightlife, giving all the free drinks at a game cantina to 9ine. Their fun ends as 12Welve, one of 9ine's former fellow Rōnin, challenges him. Gaining the upper hand, 9ine defeats her, but chooses to let her leave as he still loves her and has changed his character. 12Welve remembers his ruthless past, and seeing 9ine's change, chooses to end her pursuit vowing to meet again. The trio free Philly from the plant, and 9ine takes his leave to settle his original matter; Sam apologizes for eating his food and offers a salad she made.
6	"Unfettered"	Anne Toole
Philly heads to Madura City, hoping to sell off Sam and Casey to settle a debt he has with a local gangster. However, the town seems completely abandoned. As Philly encounters a supernatural threat, he recalls the reason he gained his immortality in the first place.
7	"Lady & The Kid"	Bryan E. Hill
Kelby and Odin eke out a slight victory and capture an enemy soldier, though they lose their remaining Botica robot soldiers in the battle. Meanwhile, Philly regales Sam and Casey with a story of how he fought off several bounty hunters sent by Lady Day. In the present, Lady Day sends a droid to find a bounty hunter named Jojo to hunt down Philly.
8	"Turnbuckle Ex-Machina"	Anne Toole
Philly tries to teach Sam some lessons about acting more friendly and human-like as the crew stops in Zenith, a largely poor town that serves as a de facto dump for the rich, high-tech island floating above them. As Philly tries to get some supplies, Sam wanders off with a strange man, and Casey meets a robot of similar make to himself with a nihilistic outlook on life.
9	"Lullaby of the Stars"	Natasha Allegri; Sib Ventress
While running from a giant crab, the gang falls down into a seemingly bottomless pit, landing on near-invisible threads. In the pit, they encounter strange beings who see them as saviors, but they demand to be addressed in song.
10	"Squeaking Springs Afternoon"	Len Uhley
When Bessie breaks down just outside of the town of Squeaking Springs, the gang leave the car in a shop with a pleasant mechanic. While Casey stays behind to fix the car, Sam wanders off around the town, and Philly finds himself arrested for murder while the bounty hunter Jojo tries to kill him.
11	"Innocence Lost Pt.1"	Nilah Magruder
Kelby's group finally reaches Gara's Keep, but the fortress seems too quiet. Odin decides to scout ahead, and stumbles into an ambush. Meanwhile, Philly's group enters the Keep from the opposite side, hoping to find Kelby themselves.
12	"Innocence Lost Pt.2"	Matt Wayne
The Fraternity has succeeded in capturing Kelby and has taken him aboard their airship. As Odin and 9ine fight against their respective attackers, Philly hitches a ride on the airship as it takes off, hoping to finish off Kelby himself. Meanwhile, Sam's Cannon Buster programming begins to take over as Casey, riding inside Bessie, tries to calm her down and save their friends at the same time.

== See also ==
- List of Devil's Due Publishing publications
