= The Reporter (Palos Heights) =

American weekly newspaper

The Reporter (formerly known as the Worth-Palos Reporter)
- Format: Weekly newspaper
- Owner: Southwest Regional Publishing Co.
- Managing editor: Joe Boyle
- Founded: 1960
- Language: English
- Headquarters: Palos Heights, Illinois, United States
- City: Palos Heights
- Country: United States
- Website: thereporteronline.net

The Reporter is an American weekly community newspaper based in the Chicago suburb of Palos Heights, Illinois, and serves the Illinois communities of Oak Lawn, Evergreen Park, Worth, Chicago Ridge, Palos Hills and Hickory Hills. It is a Thursday newspaper delivered to subscribers via mail, but hits newsstands Wednesday.

The newspaper is produced and printed by the Southwest Regional Publishing Co., which also publishes The Regional News and many high school and college newspapers, including those of Joliet Catholic Academy, Oak Lawn Community High School, Carl Sandburg High School, Moraine Valley Community College, Elmhurst College and the City Colleges of Chicago.

== History ==
It was founded in 1960 to serve Worth, Chicago Ridge, Palos Hills and Hickory Hills. The newspaper was known for many years as the Worth-Palos Reporter, the name signifying the two townships the newspaper serves (and still referred to as such by many older readers, despite not carrying that name since the mid-1980s). The paper eventually added Alsip, Crestwood and Bridgeview to its coverage area. The paid-circulation newspaper expanded again in 1983 into Oak Lawn – one of the largest municipalities today in south suburban Cook County – and Evergreen Park.

Charles Richards, then-owner of Regional Publishing Corp., purchased the newspaper in 1986. Most of the existing staff was retained as was the office in Chicago Ridge. A year later, the newspaper's office was moved to Regional Publishing's office at 12247 S. Harlem Ave. in Palos Heights. The newspaper eventually dropped Alsip, Crestwood and Bridgeview from its coverage area.

It established an Internet presence in January 2006.

In October 2014, The Regional News and The Reporter and its sister newspaper, The Regional News, as well as the company's printing press, Palos Heights headquarters and other assets, were acquired by Southwest Community Publishing Co. The new entity will be called Southwest Regional Publishing Co.

The move closed the book on the Richards family's ownership of the two newspapers. The Richards family had owned The Regional News for 67 years. The Regional News, founded in 1941 and currently the oldest business in Palos Heights, was purchased by the Richards family in 1947. Carl Richards worked during his high school years as the "printer's devil" at a small weekly newspaper in the Ozarks when he decided someday he wanted to own and publish his own community newspaper. The family purchased The Reporter in 1986.

Former owner Charles Richards succeeded his father Carl Richards as publisher and served until his retirement in 2005.

The Southwest Regional Publishing Co. is affiliated with the Southwest Community Publishing Co.

It is an owner and operator of seven weekly newspapers in Chicago and the Southwest Suburbs, including the Desplaines Valley News, Southwest News-Herald, Archer Journal News, Clear-Ridge Reporter and City NewsHound. With the addition of The Reporter and Regional News, their combined coverage territory spans from Countryside and McCook in the north through Orland Park in the south.

Founded in 2012, the company is chaired by Steve Landek and includes veteran newspaper operator Mark Hornung.

== Coverage ==
The Reporter places a strong emphasis on local news and is known as a "hyperlocal" newspaper, meaning it covers almost exclusively news and events relevant only to the people in the communities it serves, and rarely covers news outside those communities regardless of the magnitude.

It also has an award-winning sports section that covers local high-school and college athletics. Some subscribers get the newspaper solely for this section, called Sports Southwest.

The newspaper's arts and entertainment section, Out & About, includes movie reviews, an events calendar, and the occasional restaurant review. The section received second place in its class (Division C, which includes the largest non-daily newspapers in Illinois) in 2008 from the Illinois Press Association.

== See also ==
- List of newspapers in Illinois
