= Carl Jones (producer) =

American animation producer

- Born: Fayetteville, North Carolina
- Occupations: Animator; filmmaker; screenwriter; actor
- Spouse: Love Jones

Carl Jones is an American voice actor, screenwriter, animation producer, and studio executive. He is best known for his work on The Boondocks (TV series), Black Dynamite (TV series), and Good Times: Black Again, and as the co-founder of Martian Blueberry, a Los Angeles-based animation company established in 2022.

== Biography ==
Jones was raised in Fayetteville, North Carolina.

== Career ==
Jones worked for and with Titmouse Animation from 2009-2010, and Cartoon Network periodically from 2004-2015 and has resumed work with them since 2017, and is currently working with Bento Box Entertainment on Legends of Chamberlain Heights. Jones was the Executive Producer, Head Writer and Director of Black Dynamite (TV series) and Co-Executive Producer of The Boondocks (TV series), which was the first Cartoon Network program to win a Peabody Award and be nominated for a NAACP Image Award, specifically for Outstanding Writing in a Comedy Series.

He produced and directed Zombie Walk, a mixed-media film for rapper Desiigner and produced animation for Akil the Fugitive Hunter on A&E. Jones wrote for The Jellies! and served as Executive Producer on Lazor Wulf.

Carl co-founded Martian Blueberry (sometimes spelled MartianBlueberry), an animation company, with his wife, Love Jones, in 2022. The company's name was inspired by the song "Strange Fruit" by Billie Holiday.

== Personal life ==
Jones is married to Love Jones (née Barnett).
