= Star Trek: Starfleet Academy (disambiguation) =

Star Trek: Starfleet Academy is a 2026 TV series.

Star Trek: Starfleet Academy may also refer to:

== Video games ==
- Star Trek: Starfleet Academy – Starship Bridge Simulator, 1995 video game
- Star Trek: Starfleet Academy (1997 video game)

== Literature ==
- Star Trek: Starfleet Academy, a 1996 novel series, see list of Star Trek novels
- Star Trek: Starfleet Academy (comics), 1990s comics published by Marvel
- Star Trek: Starfleet Academy, a 2016 compilation comic book, from a 2015–2016 storyarc "Starfleet Academy" in IDW's Kelvin-timeline Star Trek (IDW Publishing) comics

== See also ==
- Starfleet Academy, the cadet service academy for Starfleet of the United Federation of Planets in the Star Trek fictional universe
- "Starfleet Academy", a 2020 song from the soundtrack for Star Trek: Discovery season 3
- Starfleet Academy, a play-by-mail game from JF&L; see List of play-by-mail games
- Star Trek (disambiguation)
