= Star Trek (comics) =

Comics series

This is a list of comics regarding the Star Trek media franchise.

== Publishers ==
=== Gold Key ===
Gold Key Comics published the first Star Trek comics between July 1967 and March 1979. These were stylized and diverged from the TV series continuity. In most issues, the crew members, except for Spock, wear lime green uniforms. Most plots in the Gold Key series featured original characters and concepts, but later issues included sequels to the original series episodes "The City on the Edge of Forever", "Metamorphosis", and "I, Mudd". Writers included George Kashdan, Arnold Drake and Len Wein. Originally they were illustrated by Alberto Giolitti, an Italian artist who had never seen the series and only had publicity photos to use as references. Since Giolitti didn't have a publicity photo of James Doohan, early issues of the series had Mr. Scott drawn differently. George Wilson drew several covers for the series.

The Gold Key series had a run of 61 issues. Starting with issue #20 all but nine stories were also released under the Whitman Comics brand. The original issues, most of which featured photographic covers showing images from the series, are collectible. The comic book "Star Trek No. 1," published in 1967 by Gold Key was sold at Heritage Auctions for a record-breaking price of $46,500. In the 1970s, Gold Key's parent company, Western Publishing, issued several volumes of The Enterprise Logs, republishing selected stories in omnibus form. Checker published a series of reprints ("The Key Collection") in 2004, in five volumes containing issues #1–40. From 2010 to 2015, Devil's Due Digital sold the Gold Key series in digital form. From 2014 to 2016, IDW published 5 volumes, covering issues 1-31.

Gold Key lost the Star Trek license to Marvel Comics in 1979, but Marvel's license from Paramount prohibited them from using concepts introduced in the original series.

=== Marvel ===
Marvel's series of Star Trek comics began in 1979 with an adaptation of Star Trek: The Motion Picture and continued for another two years. These tales take place during a second five-year mission of Kirk and the Enterprise that would have been featured in the never-produced Star Trek: Phase II TV series. Marvel's license from Paramount prohibited them from using concepts introduced in the original series. They were only allowed to use the characters and concepts from Star Trek: The Motion Picture. However this did not prohibit a few of the writers from cleverly sneaking in subtle easter egg references such as character names or planet names from original series episodes that Paramount editors were likely to miss. The series lasted 18 issues and ended in 1981.

=== Comic strips (UK and U.S.) ===
From 1969 to 1971, a series of weekly Star Trek comic strips ran in the British comics magazine TV21. 105 issues were produced, as well as various annuals and specials. All were original stories. Two more annuals, under the Mighty TV Comic banner, also produced original Star Trek materials: at the time, the weekly TV Comic was reprinting – two pages a week – monochrome versions of the U.S. Gold Key comics.

From 1979 to 1983, the Los Angeles Times Syndicate produced a daily and Sunday comic strip based upon Star Trek. The strip debuted on December 2, 1979. The Sunday strip ran until October 24, 1982. The daily continued until December 3, 1983. Thomas Warkentin, Sharman DiVono, Ron Harris, Larry Niven, Martin Pasko, Padraic Shigetani, Bob Meyers, Ernie Colón, Gerry Conway and Dick Kulpa wrote and illustrated these stories.

The US strip had 20 stories over its four-year run, some with titles:

1. untitled (Dec 2, 1979 - Jan 12, 1980)
2. untitled (Jan 13 - March 8, 1980)
3. The Real McCoy (March 9 - May 3, 1980)
4. untitled (May 4 - June 28, 1980)
5. untitled (June 29 - Sept 6, 1980)
6. untitled (Sept 7, 1980 - Jan 18, 1981)
7. Heads of State (Jan 18 - March 21, 1981)
8. It's a Living (March 22 - April 25, 1981)
9. The Savage Within (April 26 - July 21, 1981)
10. Quarantine (July 22 - Oct 27, 1981)
11. untitled (Oct 28, 1981 - March 1, 1982)
12. The Wristwatch Plantation (March 2 - July 17, 1982)
13. untitled (July 17 - Sept 4, 1982)
14. untitled (Sept 5 - Oct 30, 1982)
15. untitled (Nov 1, 1982 - Feb 12, 1983)
16. untitled (Feb 14 - May 7, 1983)
17. Goodbye to Spock (May 9 - July 2, 1983)
18. untitled (July 4 - Aug 13, 1983)
19. The Retirement of Admiral Kirk (Aug 15 - Oct 15, 1983)
20. untitled (Oct 17 - Dec 3, 1983)

=== Photo comics ===
In 1977, before home video was widely available, Mandala Productions and Bantam Books published books based upon The Original Series that included direct adaptations of actual color television episode frames (with word balloons) in comics format.

=== DC Comics ===
The plot of the 1984 DC series picked up immediately after Star Trek II: The Wrath of Khan. After eight issues the series took place after Star Trek III: The Search for Spock. In these later issues, Kirk, after a multi-issue showdown with the Mirror Universe, takes command of the Excelsior. Spock is mentally restored after mind-melding with his mirror self and takes command of the USS Surak. Star Trek IV: The Voyage Home took place right after Star Trek III: The Search for Spock left off, so the series wiped the slate clean by having Kirk lose command of the Excelsior and Spock return to the state he was in at the end of III. After The Voyage Home, the series continued with Kirk commanding the Enterprise-A. These issues re-introduced Arex and M'Ress from Star Trek: The Animated Series, and featured a Klingon who was a member of Starfleet, predating the same concept being featured in Star Trek: The Next Generation by several years. The first series ended in 1988 after 56 issues, 3 annuals, and two film adaptations, when Paramount required all tie-in licenses to be renegotiated.

After a year's hiatus, DC's second Star Trek series began with an adaptation of Star Trek V and took place during the gap between Star Trek V and Star Trek VI, although several issues (often either stand-alone single issues or short arcs) were also set within the timeframe of the Original Series. The new license with Paramount was more restrictive than previous, preventing characters introduced in the first series from returning. Although more limited in scope than the first series, due to restrictions from Paramount, the series lasted 80 issues and fleshed out some of the changes between V and VI, such as Sulu's promotion to captain of the Excelsior. As part of Paramount's increased restrictions on storytelling, planned appearances from Arex and M'Ress were shelved, with some formative artwork showing M'Ress (that appeared in a preview) re-drawn. Peter David and Howard Weinstein, who are also Star Trek novelists, wrote most of this series.

DC also published two Star Trek: The Next Generation comic series. The first, a six-issue limited series taking place during the first season, was published in 1988. DC launched an ongoing monthly series in October 1989, covering from season two to just before Generations. Star Trek: The Next Generation novelist Michael Jan Friedman wrote most of this series, which ran until 1996.

DC also published one of the first crossovers between the TOS and TNG eras in The Modala Imperative limited series.

=== Malibu ===
From 1993, Malibu published an ongoing series and two mini series based on Star Trek: Deep Space Nine and collaborated with DC to publish a cross-over story with that company's TNG series. Malibu also published two annuals and seven special issues, including two celebrity stories written by Star Trek actors Mark Lenard and Aron Eisenberg.

In 1996, Malibu announced plans to publish a Voyager comic, and art from this comic appeared in some comic industry periodicals, including Wizard. Marvel Comics bought Malibu, and Paramount Pictures signed a deal with Marvel to publish comics based upon Star Trek and Mission: Impossible under the new Paramount Comics banner. Subsequently, Malibu's DS9 comic came to an end and the announced Voyager comic was never published.

=== Return to Marvel ===
Marvel Comics obtained the Star Trek license in 1996. Marvel (under the "Marvel/Paramount comics" imprint) published various one-shots and the quarterly Star Trek Unlimited series, which covered TOS and TNG. Marvel also published monthly comics based upon Deep Space Nine and Voyager.

They also introduced two new ongoing series, Star Trek: Early Voyages, which dealt with Christopher Pike's adventures as captain of the Enterprise, and Star Trek: Starfleet Academy, which dealt with a group of cadets, including Deep Space Nine's Ferengi, Nog.

In addition, Marvel published a five-issue limited series, Star Trek: Untold Voyages. Similarly to Marvel's first series, Untold Voyages took place following The Motion Picture, although the original series' stories were not part of this series' continuity. Each issue took place during one mission during each year of Kirk's second five-year voyage, with the first issue set immediately following the events of the film, and the fifth issue occurring at the end of the fifth year.

Fan acceptance of these comics got off to a shaky start when Marvel's inaugural publication of its new Star Trek line turned out to be a crossover between the Original Series cast and Marvel's popular superhero team, the X-Men. This was followed by an X-Men/TNG crossover and a Pocket Books novel, Planet X, which was also based on this premise. The different series turned out popular, with Starfleet Academy and Early Voyages registering strong sales.

A crossover story named "Telepathy War" ran across several Marvel Star Trek titles: Star Trek: Starfleet Academy #12, Star Trek: Deep Space Nine #12, Star Trek: Deep Space Nine #13, Star Trek Unlimited #6, Star Trek: Voyager #13, and the one-shot Star Trek: Telepathy War #1.

After about 18 months, Marvel's management reevaluated the cost of the Star Trek license agreement with Paramount and abruptly canceled all Star Trek titles, including Early Voyages, even though it was in the middle of a story arc. The Star Trek Collector's Preview #2, coverdated July 1997, mentioned a Star Trek: Phase 3 comic (reminiscent of Star Trek: Phase II) that was supposed to be published in 1998 and to contain "an all-new ship" and "an all-new crew", but due to the general cancellation, it was never produced.

=== WildStorm ===
In 1999, the license returned to DC via its WildStorm imprint. WildStorm decided to not do an ongoing series, instead publishing limited series and trade paperback graphic novels. Writers included Nathan Archer, Kristine Kathryn Rusch and Dean Wesley Smith, Keith R.A. DeCandido, Scott Ciencin, Kevin J. Anderson, K. W. Jeter, John Ordover and David Mack.

Their TNG publications dealt with the movie era between Insurrection and Nemesis; their Deep Space Nine stories were based on the post-Season 7 novel continuity, and their Voyager series took place during the series. WildStorm also published an issue based on the novel series New Frontier (written by series creator Peter David) and the video game Elite Force.

Their license expired in 2002.

=== Tokyopop ===
For a couple of years, no comic book company held the rights to publish Trek-based comics. In October 2004, Tokyopop announced plans to publish an anthology of Next Generation-based stories presented in the style of Japanese manga.

Eventually, the project evolved into an anthology project focusing on the Original Series. Three volumes were released by Tokyopop annually between 2006 and 2008. Five artists and writer teams presented five new stories, per volume, based on the original series. A fourth volume, this time based on The Next Generation, was released in 2009.

=== IDW Publishing ===
On November 9, 2006, IDW Publishing announced that it had secured the publishing rights to Star Trek from CBS Consumer Products.

IDW's first title was Star Trek: The Next Generation: The Space Between, a six-issue limited series launched January 2007.

Over the next six years, IDW published 31 mini-series and one ongoing series with a total of over 140 issues.

In 2009, IDW published a prequel to the 2009 reboot/prequel film Star Trek, entitled Star Trek: Countdown. The story picks up eight years after the events of Star Trek: Nemesis, following Spock's efforts to diffuse a supernova from destroying Romulus—setting in motion the events of the 2009 Star Trek reboot.

In 2009, IDW published Star Trek II: The Wrath of Khan, written by Andy Schmidt and based on the second Star Trek movie, and the only movie with the Original Crew that had never previously been in comic form, as the film's release came during the gap between Marvel's and DC's licenses.

In September 2011, IDW began publishing a new ongoing Star Trek series set in the continuity of the 2009 film. A number of storylines in the ongoing series featured retellings of Original Series storylines.

In 2012, IDW published a miniseries crossover featuring the Legion of Super-Heroes from DC Comics. This was followed soon after by the first-ever licensed crossover between the Star Trek franchise and Doctor Who. These were the first of numerous crossover storylines featuring Star Trek characters interacting with characters from various superhero franchises.

In 2013, IDW published a prequel to the 2013 film Star Trek Into Darkness, entitled Star Trek: Countdown to Darkness, which featured the Enterprise encountering Robert April, who was depicted as the first captain of the Enterprise in Star Trek: The Animated Series. Its main ongoing series began telling stories set after the film.

In 2014, IDW worked with Harlan Ellison to publish a graphic novel based on his original screenplay for "The City on the Edge of Forever".

To coincide with the launch of Star Trek: Discovery, IDW published a 4-issue prequel series in 2018 entitled "The Light of Kahless," chronicling T'Kuvma's backstory and rise to Klingon warrior.

Star Trek: Discovery Annual #1 recounted the first meeting between Lt. Paul Stamets and Dr. Culber - the first openly gay couple on Star Trek.

A Star Trek and Transformers crossover, Star Trek vs. Transformers, was published in September 2018.

With Pocket Books first announcing, and then dropping plans to publish original novels set in the continuity of the 2009 film, IDW is the only publisher of original continuation stories featuring the "alternate timeline" Kelvin crew.

== Series ==
=== Eras ===
This table shows which publishers have published ongoing series or miniseries in each Star Trek era. This does not include inter-company crossovers.

Publisher	TOS	TOS films	TNG	TNG films	DS9	VOY	ENT	AR	DIS	PIC	LD	PRO	SNW	SFA	Non-TV series
Gold Key	Yes	did not exist													
British strips	Yes	did not exist													
Peter Pan	Yes	did not exist													
McDonalds	No	Yes	did not exist												
Newspaper	No	Yes	did not exist												
Marvel	No	Yes	did not exist												
DC (vol 1)	Yes	Yes	Yes	did not exist											
DC (vol 2)	Yes	Yes	Yes	Yes	No	did not exist									
Malibu	No	No	No	No	Yes	did not exist									
Marvel	Yes	Yes	Yes	No	Yes	Yes	did not exist								Early Voyages, Starfleet Academy
DC (WildStorm)	Yes	No	No	Yes	Yes	Yes	No	did not exist							New Frontier
Tokyopop	Yes	No	Yes	No	No	No	No	did not exist							
IDW	Yes	Yes	Yes	Yes	Yes	Yes	No	Yes	Yes	Yes	Yes	No	Yes	Yes	New Frontier, Resurgence, Star Trek, Defiant, The Last Starship

=== Ongoing titles ===
This is a list of all ongoing Star Trek comic book series:

Title	Publisher	Issues	Dates	Notes
Star Trek	Gold Key	#1–61	1967–1979	The Original Series
Star Trek	Marvel	#1–18	1980–1982	1979 film
Star Trek (Volume 1)	DC	#1–56	1984–1988	The Original Series, 1984 and 1986 films, The Next Generation
Star Trek: The Next Generation (Volume 1)	DC	#1–6	1988	The Next Generation
Star Trek (Volume 2)	DC	#1–80	1989–1996	The Original Series, 1989, 1991, and 1994 films, The Next Generation
Star Trek: The Next Generation (Volume 2)	DC	#1–80	1989–1996	The Original Series, The Next Generation, 1994 film
Star Trek: Deep Space Nine	Malibu	#0–32	1993–1996	Deep Space Nine
Star Trek: Deep Space Nine	Marvel	#1–15	1996–1998	Deep Space Nine
Star Trek Unlimited	Marvel	#1–10	1996–1998	The Original Series and The Next Generation
Star Trek: Voyager	Marvel	#1–15	1996–1998	Voyager
Star Trek: Starfleet Academy	Marvel	#1–19	1996–1998	Deep Space Nine
Star Trek: Early Voyages	Marvel	#1–17	1997–1998	Pre-The Original Series
Star Trek: Untold Voyages	Marvel	#1–5	1998	The Original Series, 1979 and 1982 films
Star Trek: Ongoing	IDW	#1–60	2011–2016	Kelvin timeline continuity; set after Star Trek (2009)
Star Trek: New Visions	IDW	#1–22	2014–2018	The Original Series
Star Trek: Boldly Go	IDW	#1–18	2016–2018	Kelvin timeline continuity; set after Star Trek Beyond (2016)
Star Trek: Year Five	IDW	#1–25	2019–2021	The Original Series continuity; continuation of Star Trek: Year Four (2007)
Star Trek	IDW	#1–32	2022–2025	Set between Deep Space Nine and Nemesis.
Star Trek: Defiant	IDW	#1–27	2023–2025	Set between Deep Space Nine and Nemesis.
Star Trek: Lower Decks	IDW	#1–	2024–	Lower Decks
Star Trek: The Last Starship	IDW	#1–	2025–	Set during the post-Burn era

== See also ==
- Primortals – a comic related to Leonard Nimoy
- TekWorld – a comic related to William Shatner
