= Bobbie Chase =

American comic book writer and editor

- Born: Barbara Chase
- Areas: Writer, Editor
- Notable works: Marvel Edge; G.I. Joe comics The Incredible Hulk; Star Trek comics
- Spouse: Craig Kunaschk

Barbara "Bobbie" Chase is an American editor and writer in the comic book industry. She worked for Marvel Comics throughout the 1980s and 1990s. In 1994–1995, she was one of Marvel Group's Editors-in-Chief, the highest level a female editor has ever achieved at the company. She was Vice President of Talent Development at DC Comics from 2015 to 2020.

As an editor, she has helped launched the careers of such creators as Salvador Larroca and Jamal Igle, and worked closely with writer Peter David on his acclaimed run on The Incredible Hulk. She also edited significant runs on the Marvel Comics titles G.I. Joe, Captain America, Iron Man, Sensational She-Hulk, Thor, Fantastic Four, Ghost Rider, X-Force, Doctor Strange, Spirits of Vengeance, Morbius, Nightstalkers, Darkhold: Pages from the Book of Sins, Blade, Elektra, Alpha Flight, and the Marvel/Paramount Comics Star Trek line, including brand-new properties Starfleet Academy and Star Trek: Early Voyages. For DC Comics she has edited titles such as Batgirl, Nightwing, Teen Titans, Red Hood and the Outlaws, Birds of Prey, and Green Arrow.

== Biography ==
=== Education ===
Chase graduated from Mount Holyoke College with a BA in English. She also studied at the University of St. Andrews in Scotland, and studied design and illustration at the Parsons School of Design and the New School for Social Research.

=== Marvel Comics ===
Chase began working for Marvel in 1985 when she was hired as an assistant editor of Marvel's Special Projects Department. She then went on to do work as a freelance writer and designer.

In 1986, she was promoted to Editor. She had a lengthy run as editor of Marvel's line of G.I. Joe comics, including the flagship title G.I. Joe: A Real American Hero.

In 1988, she took over the editorial reins of The Incredible Hulk, editing that title for 10 years.

In 1989, while editing John Byrne's The Sensational She-Hulk series, she came into conflict with the creator, and he was ultimately fired from the series. In 1990, she edited the Steeltown Rockers limited series.

During her time at Marvel, Chase was cited in the company's "Bullpen Bulletins" news and information page as both "Battling" Bobbie Chase and "Breathtaking" Bobbie Chase.

Because of her tenure on Marvel's G.I. Joe comics, in early 1991 Chase worked with Hasbro and Impel Marketing (Upper Deck Company) on developing the first sets of GI Joe trading cards.

In the early 1990s, Chase had long tenures as editor of Ghost Rider and Doctor Strange. With her associate editor Evan Skolnick, Chase revitalized those monthly series, which were critically lauded and boasted relatively strong sales (taking into account the general sagging of the comic book market at that time).

In late 1994, Chase was made Editor-in-Chief of the company's Marvel Edge imprint, which published comics aimed towards older teens, including such titles as Daredevil, Doctor Strange, Sorcerer Supreme, Ghost Rider, Incredible Hulk, and Punisher.

In 1995, Chase became Executive Editor of Marvel Entertainment. During this period, Chase was the editor for a number of Star Trek comic book series, including:

- Star Trek/X-Men (1996)
- Star Trek: Voyager (1996–1998)
- Star Trek: Starfleet Academy (1996–1998)
- Star Trek: Early Voyages (1997–1998)

In 1997, she edited the Heroes Return limited series, featuring the return of Captain America, Iron Man, Fantastic Four, the Avengers, and several other superheroes. Chase (along with Peter David and Adam Kubert) was nominated for a 1998 Harvey Award for Best Single Issue or Story for The Incredible Hulk #-1.

She took over the editorial reins of Iron Man in 1998, staying in charge of that title until 2001. From 1999 to 2001 she was editor of Fantastic Four.

Chase was laid off from Marvel in 2001 when Joe Quesada and Bill Jemas took over the top posts.

=== Children's publishing ===
After leaving Marvel, Chase served as Editorial Director of the equine-focused book sales club PONY, a division of the Norwegian publisher Stabenfeldt International.

=== DC Comics ===
In 2011, she joined DC Comics as a senior editor on the Batman titles, such as Nightwing, Batgirl, and Teen Titans. She was hired by Bob Harras, an old colleague from Marvel. In 2012 she was promoted to DC Universe Editorial Director, working on such titles as Red Hood and the Outlaws and The Savage Hawkman. In April 2015 Chase was named Vice President of Talent Development at DC. She was laid off from DC on August 10, 2020.

== Personal life ==
Chase currently resides in Los Angeles. Bobbie is married to Craig Kunaschk, who at the time was Marvel's Manager of Business Relations and Direct Sales, and the two have a son, Chase, and a daughter, Clare.

== Bibliography ==
As writer, unless otherwise noted:

=== Marvel Comics ===
- Star Brand Annual (1987)
- Hulk (1988)
- Marvel Comics Presents #15 (March 1989) — "The Maiden Phoenix, " with Dwayne Turner (p), Mike Gustovich (i)
- Marvel Girl (1989)
- She-Hulk (1990)
- Spellbound (1993)

=== Amalgam (DC/Marvel) ===
- Speed Demon (1996)

== Notes ==
Preceded by Tom DeFalco	Marvel Comics Group Editors-in-Chief; Mark Gruenwald, Marvel Universe titles; Bob Harras, mutant titles; Bob Budiansky, Spider-Man titles; Bobbie Chase, Marvel Edge titles; Carl Potts, licensed-property titles 1994–1995	Succeeded by Bob Harras
Preceded by N/A	DC Universe Editorial Director; 2012–2015	Succeeded by N/A
