= Star Trek (disambiguation) =

Star Trek is a science fiction franchise.

Star Trek may also refer to:

== Star Trek franchise ==
=== Television ===
- Star Trek: The Original Series, a 1966–69 live-action series known simply as Star Trek
- Star Trek: The Animated Series or The Animated Adventures of Gene Roddenberry's Star Trek, a 1973–74 animated series
- See also: List of Star Trek television series

=== Books and comics ===
- Star Trek (Bantam Books), several series of novelizations, original novels, and other books, published 1967—1991
- Star Trek (DC Comics), a 1984–1996 comic book series
- Star Trek (IDW Publishing), a comic book series since 2007
- Star Trek (2022 comic), a comic book series since 2022
- See also: Star Trek (comics)

=== Film ===
- Star Trek: The Motion Picture, a 1979 film
- Star Trek (2009 film)
  - Star Trek (novel), a novelization of the 2009 film
  - Star Trek (2009 soundtrack), a soundtrack album from the 2009 film
- See also: List of Star Trek films

=== Games ===
- Star Trek (script game), a text-based mainframe computer game from the early 1970s
- Star Trek (1971 video game), a text-based computer game from the late 1970s
- Star Trek (1979 pinball), a pinball game developed by Bally
- Star Trek (1991 pinball), a pinball machine released by Data East
- Star Trek: The Role Playing Game, a 1982 role-playing game by FASA Corporation
- Star Trek Roleplaying Game (Last Unicorn Games), a series of role-playing games
- Star Trek Roleplaying Game (Decipher), a 2002 role-playing game by Decipher
- Star Trek, a variation of Computer Space, a video game
- Star Trek (arcade game), from 1983, developed by Sega Electronics
- Star Trek (2013 video game), developed by Digital Extremes
- See also: History of Star Trek games

== Outside the franchise ==
- "Star Trek" (American Dad!), an episode of American Dad!
- Star Trek project, a canceled port of Apple's System 7.1 operating system to Intel x86 computers in collaboration with Novell

== See also ==
- HTC Startrek, a Windows Mobile smartphone
- Star Track (disambiguation)
- Star Trak Entertainment, a record label also known as Star Trak
