= Paramount Comics =

- Parent company: Marvel Comics
- Status: Defunct
- Founded: 1996; 29 years ago
- Defunct: 1998; 27 years ago
- Key people: Len Wein (editor-in-chief); Art Young (editor); Bob Foster (editor); Cris Palomino (editor); David Seidman
- Publication types: Comic books
- Fiction genres: Comics
- Imprints: Vista Comics (planned); Touchmark Comics (announced; never published)

Paramount Comics was a comic book imprint of Marvel Comics that was active for about two years beginning in 1996, the banner was named in honor of the namesake studio Paramount Pictures.

== History ==
The imprint was the result of a deal between Marvel and Paramount to produce licensed comic book series based upon the entertainment company's franchises: Mission: Impossible (Note: In particular the soon-to-be-launched film series.) and Star Trek. The agreement resulted in DC Comics and Malibu Comics abruptly losing the rights to publish their own Star Trek comic series.

=== Notable series and titles ===
The first title published under the Paramount Comics banner was a prequel to the first Mission: Impossible film (Note: The first M:I comic since Dell Comics ended their series in the early 1970s.). This was followed soon after by a one-shot crossover between the original Star Trek series and Marvel's superhero team, the X-Men. After that, Marvel launched comic series respectively based upon all four Trek series produced to that time, including Star Trek: Voyager, a title Malibu had been scheduled to produce but was unable due to the change of license.

Marvel also launched an original series, Star Trek: Starfleet Academy, as well as Star Trek: Early Voyages which featured the adventures of Captain Christopher Pike and his crew.

The agreement between Paramount and Marvel hit some major snags after about a year, resulting in Paramount withdrawing support for non-series based characters and storylines. As a result, both Early Voyages and Starfleet Academy were abruptly cancelled in the midst of their respective story arcs. Marvel phased out the Paramount Comics banner and their remaining Star Trek titles lasted for about another year before ending in 1998. The Star Trek license was subsequently picked up by DC's WildStorm Productions imprint. The Paramount Comics logo continued to be used in WildStorm's Trek comics, although it was only featured on the interior title page, not on the cover as it was with Marvel.

Besides Trek, Mission: Impossible and a one-shot starring Snake Plissken (Note: Itself a tie-in to the 1996 film Escape from L.A..), Paramount also published a one-shot based on the Terrytoons animated series The Mighty Heroes. An ongoing Mission: Impossible series had been announced, but only the one-shot was ever published.

=== Aftermath ===
Years after the demise of Paramount Comics, Marvel again made a deal with the studio; this time, Paramount would be the distributor for a number of feature films in the Marvel Cinematic Universe produced by Marvel's film production unit, Marvel Studios, until The Walt Disney Company took over distribution from Paramount, following the acquisition of Marvel by Disney.

== Publications ==
- Mission: Impossible #1 (May 1996)
- Star Trek: Collector's Preview #1 (July 1996)
- Star Trek: Deep Space Nine #1–15 (November 1996–March 1998)
- Star Trek: Early Voyages #1–17 (February 1997–June 1998)
- Star Trek: First Contact #1 (November 1996)
- Star Trek: Mirror Mirror #1 (February 1997)
- Star Trek: Operation Assimilation #1 (April 1997)
- Star Trek: Starfleet Academy #1–19 (December 1996–June 1998)
- Star Trek: Telepathy War #1 (November 1997)
- Star Trek: Untold Voyages #1–5 (March–July 1998)
- Star Trek: Voyager #1–15 (November 1996–March 1998)
- Star Trek: Voyager – Splashdown #1–4 (April–July 1998)
- Star Trek Unlimited #1–10 (November 1996–July 1998)
- Star Trek/X-Men #1 (December 1996)
- Star Trek: The Next Generation Special – Riker: The Enemy of My Enemy #1 (July 1998)
- Star Trek: The Next Generation/X-Men: Second Contact #1 (May 1998)
- The Adventures of Snake Plissken #1 (January 1997)
- The Mighty Heroes #1 (January 1998)
