= Star Trek: Day of Blood =

2023 Star Trek comic

- Star Trek: Day of Blood #1
- Publisher: IDW Publishing
- Publication date: July – September 2023
- Genre: Science fiction
- Main characters: Benjamin Sisko; Worf; Kahless

Creative team
- Writers: Christopher Cantwell; Collin Kelly; Jackson Lanzing
- Artists: Ramon Rosanas; Angel Unzueta
- Letterer: Clayton Cowless
- Colorists: Lee Loughridge; Marissa Louise
- Editor: Heather Antos

Star Trek: Day of Blood is a comic book crossover event released by the Star Trek imprint of IDW Publishing. In the story, the villain Kahless starts a coup in the Klingon empire and the captains Benjamin Sisko and Worf join forces to stop him. It involves the ongoing comics Star Trek and Star Trek: Defiant.

== Publication history ==
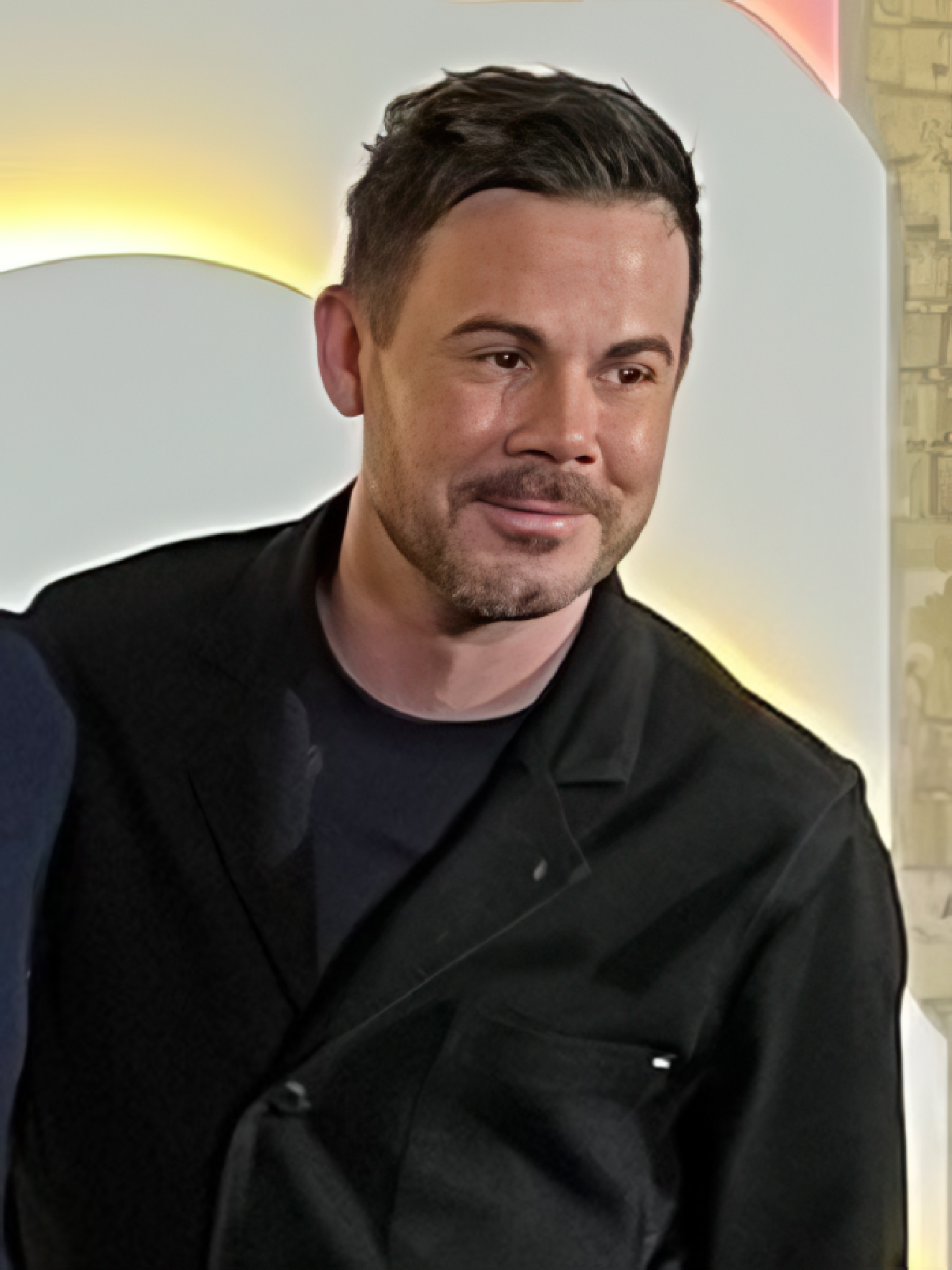
Christopher Cantwell, writer of the series.

Heather Antos, editor of the Star Trek imprint of IDW Publishing, was planning to relaunch the line and asked writers Jackson Lanzing and Collin Kelly what did they think a Star Trek comic should be about. After writing Star Trek: Year Five they were done with the original series, and so moved to the 1990s series. Still, the project would build upon plotlines introduced in that comic and Star Trek: Aliens — Klingons. They were soon talking about the beings with godlike powers, and that Star Trek has a recurring approach of revealing humanlike flaws underneath their power. Seeking a new angle, they sought to confront such beings with an adversary bent on warfare rather than diplomacy, and so settled with the Klingons in general and Kahless in particular. They thought that he could be a good foil for Captain Benjamin Sisko, and a good villain for the new Star Trek series.

The cast of the series, with characters from several TV series serving in the same ship, also includes Shaxs from the recent animated series Star Trek: Lower Decks. Lanzing explained that the story would be very violent, and Shaxs was selected because his love for violence made him a good fit for the Star Trek comic after Worf's departure. Cantwell pointed out that, when writing the plot, they frequently joked "...and meanwhile, Shaxs is just having the best day of his life". Eventually, Antos authorized the creation of a tie-in comic, Day of Blood: Shaxs' Best Day, written by Ryan North, who had already written a Lower Decks comic miniseries. The story is set before the events of the animated series and emulates its visual style.

The first preview of the story was released in the 2023 Free Comic Book Day comic. The cover shows a combadge covered in blood, similar to the smiley of Watchmen.

The Star Trek comics had done several crossovers in the past with other franchises, such as Doctor Who, Green Lantern, and Planet of the Apes. IDW also published The Q Conflict, a crossover between the first four TV series. Day of Blood is the first Star Trek crossover event between two ongoing comic books set in the same shared universe.

== Premise ==
Kahless of the Klingon empire starts a cult, the Red Path, that seeks to annihilate all godlike beings from the universe. He also declares war to all space civilizations that do not follow him, including Starfleet. Captain Benjamin Sisko (who had been taken to another plane of existence by the Prophets at the end of Star Trek: Deep Space Nine) is returned to the corporeal world to stop him. He leads the ship USS Theseus, and retrieved the Orb of Creation. Worf left the crew of Sisko, stole the Defiant ship, and got another crew to oppose Kahless as well. Even more, Worf discovered that his son Alexander joined the Red Path.

Both ships join forces at Q'Onos, the Klingon homeworld, as the Red Path start a coup against emperor Martok, who is gravely injured. Both crews manage to rescue him and save his life, and escape from the Klingon ships. Sisko and Worf face Kahless: Worf defeats Alexander, who was defending Kahless, and Sisko counters his power with the orb of destruction.

== Reception ==
I-j Wheaton from CBR praises the writing of the comic, with the authors of both ongoing comics making a story that feels in line with both comics' styles and ongoing subplots. He also praised the groups of characters paired together, but points that this leads to heavy exposition in the first issue. He also praised the art by Rosanas, focused on the details and making the characters recognizable from their TV portrayals but also avoiding the uncanny valley effect.

== Reading order ==
1. Star Trek: Prelude to Day of Blood
2. Star Trek: Day of Blood #1
3. Star Trek: Defiant #6
4. Star Trek #11
5. Star Trek: Defiant #7
6. Star Trek #12
7. Star Trek: Day of Blood - Shaxs' Best Day
