= Star Trek: The Next Generation (disambiguation) =

Star Trek: The Next Generation is a science fiction television series that originally aired from 1987 to 1994.

Star Trek: The Next Generation may also refer to:

- Star Trek: The Next Generation (1993 video game)
- Star Trek: The Next Generation (1994 video game)
- Star Trek: The Next Generation (pinball)

== See also ==
- List of comic books based on Star Trek: The Next Generation
- Star Trek (disambiguation)
