= Marvel Edge =

Marvel Comics imprint

Marvel
- Parent company: Marvel Comics
- Predecessor: Midnight Sons
- Founded: 1995
- Defunct: 1996
- Successor: Marvel Knights
- Country of origin: U.S.
- Headquarters location: New York
- Key people: Bobbie Chase, Editor-in-Chief
- Publication types: Comic books
- Owners: Marvel Entertainment, LLC (The Walt Disney Company)

Marvel Edge was a short-lived Marvel Comics imprint lasting from 1995 to 1996. Some of Marvel's "edgier" (more adult) titles were moved into the Marvel Edge imprint. These included titles featuring such characters as Daredevil, Doctor Strange, the Ghost Rider, the Hulk, Nick Fury, and the Punisher.

Marvel Edge was discontinued right before the Onslaught Saga (cover-dated May 1996).

== History ==
Following an inter-office shake-up in late 1994, Tom DeFalco was removed as Marvel's Editor-in-Chief. Rather than name a successor, Marvel appointed five "Editors-in-Chief", each of whom would oversee a certain number of titles and, by extension, a certain portion of the Marvel Universe. This change was reflected externally by collecting all Marvel monthlies into broad groups: the X-Men titles, the Spider-Man titles, and three new imprints, one of them being Marvel Edge, which was overseen by Bobbie Chase.

The imprint was launched with the storyline "Over the Edge" (beginning in comics cover-dated September 1995) in which the Punisher went temporarily insane. He became convinced Nick Fury and S.H.I.E.L.D. were responsible for the death of his family, and pursued Fury through various titles which would form the core of the imprint, finally killing him. This led to a relaunch of the Punisher title, where the Mafia faked Frank Castle's execution and recruited him as a mob boss.

The Marvel Edge imprint was discontinued after all comics were published with a cover-date of April 1996.

== Marvel Edge titles ==
=== Ongoing series ===
- Daredevil #344-351 (Sept. 1995–April 1996)
- Doctor Strange, Sorcerer Supreme 1988 series, #81-88 (Sept. 1995–April 1996)
- Ghost Rider 1990 series, #65-72 (Sept. 1995–April 1996)
- The Incredible Hulk (vol. 2) #433-439 (Sept. 1995–March 1996)
- Punisher 1995 series, #1-6 (Nov. 1995–April 1996)

=== Miniseries ===
- Doc Samson (1996, #1-4)
- Skrull Kill Krew (1995, #1-4)
- Spider-Man/Punisher: Family Plot (1996, #1-2)
- Over the Edge (1995 series, #1-10)
- Typhoid (1995, #1-4)

=== One-shot issues ===
- The Hulk: Cutting Edge (1995, one-shot)
- Double Edge (1995 alpha, 1995 omega)
- Ghost Rider: Crossroads (one-shot)
- Savage Hulk (1996, one-shot)

== See also ==
- Marvel MAX
- Marvel Knights
