= Star Trek (2022 comic) =

2022 comic book

- Star Trek #1. From left to right: T'Lir, Data, Benjamin Sisko, Sato and Beverly Crusher

Publication information
- Publisher: IDW Publishing
- Format: ongoing
- Genre: SciFi
- Publication date: October 2022
- No. of issues: 1

Creative team
- Written by: Collin Kelly; Jackson Lanzing
- Artist: Ramon Rosanas
- Editor: Heather Antos

Star Trek is an ongoing comic book by IDW Publishing, based on characters from the Star Trek franchise, by the writers Collin Kelly and Jackson Lanzing. It is part of the Star Trek series of comics published by IDW.

== Publication history ==
Although IDW Publishing has a prolific line of Star Trek comics, the previous ongoing comic titled simply "Star Trek" had closed in 2016 and had no replacement until this point. Heather Antos was appointed the new editor of the line, and sought to raise it to a prominence similar to that of the Star Wars comics by Marvel. He called the writers Collin Kelly and Jackson Lanzing, who had written Star Trek: Year Five, and asked them what should such a flagship comic be like. They thought that, as Year Five was set in the gap between the end of Star Trek: The Original Series and the film Star Trek: The Motion Picture, the comic could be set in the gap between the end of the 1990s series (The Next Generation (TNG), Deep Space Nine (DS9) and Voyager (VOY)) and the film Star Trek: Nemesis. The arts are by Ramon Rosanas (Star Wars), a big Star Trek fan, selected by his ability to draw awesome events and people being in awe with them, which would fit the intended plots for the first arcs. The creative team also includes colorist Lee Loughridge and letterer Clayton Cowles.

Both Kelly and Rosanas are fans of Star Trek, and were interested in the project. Kelly said that "Dreams of an optimistic, utopian future of cooperation and equality are more important now than ever. We're both excited to continue the stories that have meant so much to us in the past and to welcome new readers to Starfleet. This is a grand adventure, one that weaves together elements from every Star Trek series to tell a new, vital, and forward-thinking sci-fi saga". Rosanas said that "Gene Roddenberry is History with a capital H and his legacy is unstoppable. Having an opportunity to bring my passion and creativity to this franchise is incredibly exciting for me".

Comic books are not usually considered to be part of the Star Trek canon. However, the writers decided to face the series as if it were canon anyway. "This is real Star Trek. This is as close as we can, on the comic side, to being canon. We will be canon until they un-canonize us. But we are working with the shows. We are in communication with the teams. We are encyclopedic Star Trek knowledge boys, so we're on Memory-Alpha all the time, but our brains are effectively little Memory-Alphas. We're already fed by all the canon that we grew up with, that being TOS to Voyager. So all of that stuff, if it was on the show, it's canon". The comics replace the former line of Star Trek novels, as those were written for concluded series and under the assumption that the characters would never return in other ones. Lanzing explains that "We're taking this as an opportunity to effectively fill those spaces, those timeline periods that a lot of those books and comics covered with new canon that lines up with the shows that have been created since then, because a lot of that stuff was created with the understanding there would never be shows again. Now we know that there will be, so we are trying to create new canon that exists inside that space. But these are the characters you know. This is the canonical Benjamin Sisko sequel story. This is the last ride of Data before Nemesis. These are those stories. This is what happened to Tom Paris after he came back from Voyager." To also stay accessible to readers unfamiliar with all the Star Trek continuity the comic uses infographic pages, an idea that Lanzing took from the X-Men comics House of X and Powers of X.

As the usual circumstances related to actors in live-action series do not apply to comic books, the line fully embraced the setting as a shared universe, drawing elements from all series. Previously, this had only been tried in crossovers such as The Q conflict. Kelly clarified that they are free to use any character from the franchise, as long as they do not contradict works set at a later date, such as the aforementioned Nemesis film. "They're giving us a lot of access to all the toys, with the understanding that at the end of it, we will put the toys back in the box. There is about a year and a half here of Star Trek timeline that is untouched, and within this, we can make all sorts of trouble as long as we put the characters that need to be back in the box for Nemesis". The worldbuilding would be continued with spin-off comics such as Star Trek: Defiant.

The original draft premise for the comic was a story focused on the beings of the Star Trek universe with godlike powers, as the authors felt that unlike other fictional universes they are treated with an approach closer to science, such as explaining them as higher in the Kardashev scale rather than with magic or mythology. At that point they decided that the main character had to be Benjamin Sisko, the main character from Deep Space Nine, but feared that they would not be allowed to use him because of the final fate of the character in the TV series. However, the editor green-lighted the return of Sisko, who became the main character of the comic. The rest of the crew was taken from other series. Data was added to provide balance, countering Sisko's conflicts with a grounded and rational perspective. Beverly Crusher, from TNG, was included as well. The crew also features two new characters, the Andorian Aholialili Sato (granddaughter of Hoshi Sato from Star Trek: Enterprise) and the Vulcan T'Lir. Lanzing compared it with the characters introduced in the Star Wars comics, such as Doctor Aphra. "Our objective is not to just play the hits. We all feel like we need new characters, and new ways into these stories. One of my favorite Star Wars characters has never appeared in a Star Wars television show or movie, which is Dr. Aphra. Just love Aphra to death up and down. Aphra is a comic book character. There's no reason Star Trek shouldn't have Aphras, and that's a mission statement from us on the book from the get-go. So you'll notice there are two new characters on the bridge, which is our first step into that lane".

== Plot ==
Years after the finale of the TV series Star Trek: Deep Space Nine, the prophets turn Benjamin Sisko into a corporeal man once again. The Klingon emperor Kahless is killing all godlike entities, and Sisko tries to locate and stop him. For this end, he gets a new ship, the Theseus. After finding him Sisko joins forces with Worf, now captain of the Defiant, to attack Kahless on the Klingon homeworld.

== Issues ==
No.	Issue(s)	Date	Collection	Date	ISBN
0	A Perfect System (Star Trek, Issue 400)	September 7, 2022	Star Trek, Volume 1: Godshock	July 18, 2023	1684059909
1	Godshock, Part 1	October 26, 2022	Star Trek, Volume 1: Godshock	July 18, 2023	1684059909
2	Godshock, Part 2	November 30, 2022	Star Trek, Volume 1: Godshock	July 18, 2023	1684059909
3	Godshock, Part 3	January 4, 2023	Star Trek, Volume 1: Godshock	July 18, 2023	1684059909
4	Godshock, Part 4	February 1, 2023	Star Trek, Volume 1: Godshock	July 18, 2023	1684059909
5	Godshock, Part 5	March 1, 2023	Star Trek, Volume 1: Godshock	July 18, 2023	1684059909
6	Godshock, Part 6	April 12, 2023	Star Trek, Volume 1: Godshock	July 18, 2023	1684059909
7	The Red Path, Part 1	April 26, 2023	Star Trek, Volume 2: The Red Path	December 5, 2023	9798887240237
8	The Red Path, Part 2	May 17, 2023	Star Trek, Volume 2: The Red Path	December 5, 2023	9798887240237
0	Star Trek Annual (2023)	May 31, 2023	Star Trek, Volume 2: The Red Path	December 5, 2023	9798887240237
9	The Red Path, Part 3	June 14, 2023	Star Trek, Volume 2: The Red Path	December 5, 2023	9798887240237
10	The Red Path, Part 4	July 12, 2023	Star Trek, Volume 2: The Red Path	December 5, 2023	9798887240237
11	Day of Blood, Part 3	August 23, 2023	Star Trek: Day of Blood (Crossover with Star Trek: Defiant)	March 12, 2024	9798887240732
12	Day of Blood, Part 5	September 27, 2023	Star Trek: Day of Blood (Crossover with Star Trek: Defiant)	March 12, 2024	9798887240732
13	Glass and Bones, Part 1	October 25, 2023	Star Trek, Volume 3: Glass and Bone	October 15, 2024	9798887241203
14	Glass and Bones, Part 2	November 22, 2023	Star Trek, Volume 3: Glass and Bone	October 15, 2024	9798887241203
15	Glass and Bones, Part 3	December 20, 2023	Star Trek, Volume 3: Glass and Bone	October 15, 2024	9798887241203
16	Glass and Bones, Part 4	January 17, 2024	Star Trek, Volume 3: Glass and Bone	October 15, 2024	9798887241203
17	Glass and Bones, Part 5	February 21, 2024	Star Trek, Volume 3: Glass and Bone	October 15, 2024	9798887241203
18	Glass and Bones, Part 6	March 20, 2024	Star Trek, Volume 3: Glass and Bone	October 15, 2024	9798887241203
19	Pleroma, Part 1	April 17, 2024	Star Trek, Volume 4: Pleroma	April 15, 2025	979-8887242705
20	Pleroma, Part 2	May 15, 2024	Star Trek, Volume 4: Pleroma	April 15, 2025	979-8887242705
21	Pleroma, Part 3	June 19, 2024	Star Trek, Volume 4: Pleroma	April 15, 2025	979-8887242705
22	Pleroma, Part 4	July 17, 2024	Star Trek, Volume 4: Pleroma	April 15, 2025	979-8887242705
0	Star Trek Annual (2024)	July 17, 2024	Star Trek, Volume 4: Pleroma	April 15, 2025	979-8887242705
23	Pleroma, Part 5	August 21, 2024	Star Trek, Volume 4: Pleroma	April 15, 2025	979-8887242705
24	Pleroma, Part 6	September 25, 2024	Star Trek, Volume 4: Pleroma	April 15, 2025	979-8887242705
25	When the Walls Fell, Part 1	October 16, 2024	Star Trek, Volume 5: When the Walls Fell	September 30, 2024	979-8887243573
26	When the Walls Fell, Part 2	November 20, 2024	Star Trek, Volume 5: When the Walls Fell	September 30, 2024	979-8887243573
27	When the Walls Fell, Part 3	December 18, 2024	Star Trek, Volume 5: When the Walls Fell	September 30, 2024	979-8887243573
28	When the Walls Fell, Part 4	January 22, 2025	Star Trek, Volume 5: When the Walls Fell	September 30, 2024	979-8887243573
29	When the Walls Fell, Part 5	February 19, 2025	Star Trek, Volume 5: When the Walls Fell	September 30, 2024	979-8887243573
30	When the Walls Fell, Part 6	March 5, 2025	Star Trek, Volume 5: When the Walls Fell	September 30, 2024	979-8887243573
31	Lore War, Part 3	April 23, 2025	Star Trek: Lore War (Crossover with Star Trek: Defiant)	January 13, 2026	979-8887243597
32	Lore War, Part 5	June 4, 2025	Star Trek: Lore War (Crossover with Star Trek: Defiant)	January 13, 2026	979-8887243597

== Reception ==
Sam Stone from CBR considers that, even without taking the team-up of characters into account, Star Trek #1 "stands as the strongest single issue IDW Publishing has released in recent memory". He points that the multiple characters used are not gimmicks for fan service, but rather used for character-driven scenes and escalating stakes. He praised the artist for making the characters recognizable, and also avoiding the uncanny valley effect. He praised the writers for using all characters in roles that fit their last TV appearances, but warns that readers should have at least a minimal knowledge of the ending of the DS9 series.

The series has been nominated for the 2023 Eisner Awards as Best New Series and Best Single Issue / One-shot (Star Trek #400). It was also named Comic Con's Best Comic Book Series of 2023.
