= Star Trek (IDW Publishing) =

Comic book series

- Cover of Star Trek #1, flagship comic of the line.

Publication information
- Publisher: IDW Publishing
- Schedule: Irregular
- Format: Ongoing and limited series
- Publication date: January 2007 - present
- No. of issues: 197

Star Trek is a comic book series by IDW Publishing, based on the Star Trek science fiction entertainment franchise created by Gene Roddenberry. Since 2007, IDW Publishing has released three Star Trek ongoing series along with many limited series, crossover series and annuals.

== Publication history ==
=== 2006–2010 ===
On November 9, 2006, IDW Publishing announced that they had secured the publishing rights to Star Trek from CBS Consumer Products.

IDW's first title, Star Trek: The Next Generation: The Space Between, is a six-issue limited series launched January 2007. The Space Between is written by David Tischman and drawn by Casey Maloney. This storyline was collected in trade paperback form in September 2007.

The second series Star Trek: Klingons: Blood Will Tell, launched in April, focusing on the Klingons' point of view on various episodes from the original series - the first four issues based around "Errand of Mercy", "The Trouble with Tribbles", "A Private Little War" and "Day of the Dove", respectively, and features a framing story based around the events of Star Trek VI: The Undiscovered Country.

A third series started in July 2007, called Star Trek: Year Four, continuing the five-year mission of Kirk's Enterprise after the end of Star Trek: The Original Series. A fourth series, Alien Spotlight launched in September 2007, focusing on various alien races.

2008 saw the publication of the "Mirror Images" series, which tell the stories of Mirror Universe Kirk's overthrow of Captain Christopher Pike, and of the alternates of the Enterprise-D crew. In the same year they published Star Trek: Assignment: Earth, a mini-series that features the adventures of Gary Seven from the Star Trek TOS episode Assignment: Earth.

In 2009, IDW began to publish their first Star Trek: Deep Space Nine comic, the four-part Fool's Gold.

Also, in 2009, IDW published a prequel to the 2009 reboot/prequel film Star Trek, entitled Star Trek: Countdown.

In 2009, IDW published Star Trek II: The Wrath of Khan, written by Andy Schmidt and based on the second Star Trek movie, and the only movie that has never been in comic form from the Original Crew.

Other recent series include Star Trek: Crew, Star Trek: Romulans, Pawns of War and Star Trek: Doctor McCoy, Frontier Doctor.

=== 2011–2021 ===
==== 2009 film continuity ====
In September 2011, IDW began publishing a new ongoing Star Trek series, set in the continuity of the 2009 Star Trek film. This series ran for 60 issues and concluded in 2016.

In January 2013, IDW began publishing Star Trek: Countdown to Darkness, a prequel to the film Star Trek Into Darkness (2013). Later that year, in October, they began publishing Star Trek: Khan, another tie-in, focusing on the film's antagonist Khan Noonien Singh.

A new ongoing, titled Star Trek: Boldly Go, was launched in 2016 and continues with the status quo established by the film Star Trek Beyond (2016). The series explored new situations such as "Kirk, McCoy, Sulu, and Chekov [transferring] over to the USS Endeavor, while Spock and Uhura settled on New Vulcan. Meanwhile, Scotty became an instructor at Starfleet Academy, with Jaylah as a student". The Borg were a reoccurring villain in the series and the last arc dealt with "multiversal chaos" which brought "together the Enterprise crews from several different realities". The series ran for 18 issues and concluded in 2018.

==== Original continuity ====
In September 2012, IDW began a four-issue miniseries "Star Trek: The Next Generation - HIVE" about the return of Locutus of Borg.

In 2014, IDW worked with Harlan Ellison to publish a graphic novel based on his original screenplay for "The City on the Edge of Forever".

To coincide with the launch of Star Trek: Discovery, IDW published a 4-issue prequel series in 2018 entitled "The Light of Kahless," chronicling T'Kuvma's backstory and rise to Klingon warrior. Star Trek: Discovery Annual #1 recounted the first meeting between Lt. Paul Stamets and Dr. Culber – the first openly gay couple on Star Trek.

A new ongoing, titled Star Trek: Year Five, was launched in 2019 and continues the story of the Kirk's Enterprise from Star Trek: Year Four. The Hollywood Reporter commented that "the series will be written by a rotating team of talent, with a writer’s room made up of Brandon Easton, Jody Houser, Jim McCann and the team of Collin Kelly and Jackson Lanzing". The series concluded with issue #25 in 2021. Jared Mason Murray, for Screen Rant, highlighted that the creative team "have rendered what feels like the most accurate spiritual continuation of the beloved sci-fi television show. [...] Star Trek: Year Five is a worthy entry into the Star Trek mythos and will finally make sense of years of continuity confusion". Jamie Lovett, for ComicBook.com, highlighted the "near-anthology" and episodic format of series with a rotating creative team with change as the "overarching theme". Lovett wrote that "the writing has focused on showing how the characters from The Original Series became the changed character who returned for the Star Trek movies. [...] Star Trek: Year Five is a remarkable achievement for a licensed comic. Often, these titles have little new or exciting to offer fans of their source material and even less for those who aren't familiar, ultimately feeling redundant or vestigial. Star Trek: Year Five is neither. It set out on a mission to tell an essential missing chapter in the lives of these characters, and it succeeded".

==== Mirror Universe ====
From 2017 to 2018, IDW published three limited series set in the Mirror Universe: Mirror Broken (2017), Through the Mirror (2018), and Terra Incognita (2018). These series focused on Jean-Luc Picard and the crew of the ISS Enterprise. Mirror Broken was included on Screen Rant's 2022 "The 10 Best Star Trek Comics" list — the article states "one of the strengths of the miniseries is its ability to impart a lot of information in a digestible and fun-to-read manner. [...] Though the story isn't as fleshed out as other miniseries, it is still a fascinating glimpse into the mirror universe".

A new limited series, entitled Mirror War, was first published in 2021. It is a thirteen part continuation of the 2017–2018 Mirror Universe saga. It follows Picard's ongoing galactic conquest which draws the attention of the Klingon-Cardassian Alliance. It will also have several issues which follow individual members of the ISS Enterprise crew.

=== 2022–present ===
Along with the continued publication of Mirror War (2021), IDW published two anthologies in 2022 — the relaunched Alien Spotlight series and Adventures in the 32nd Century (a Star Trek: Discovery tie-in) series. IDW also released The Mirror Universe Saga trade paperback, a reprint of a 1980s DC Comics run set in the Mirror Universe.

Star Trek, the flagship comic by Jackson Lanzing, Kelly, Marcus To, Loughridge and Clayton Cowles, is set in the period between Voyager and Nemesis. It has a roster of characters from several series, led by Benjamin Sisko. To reuse the character after the events of the Deep Space 9 finale, it was retconned that the prophets released him back into the physical world. The comic was followed by the spin-off comic Star Trek: Defiant, where Worf leaves Sisko's crew and creates his own one. It is also a roster of characters from many series, including an aged Spock from the original series. Both series made IDW's first comic-book crossover of the Star Trek franchise, Day of Blood. A spin-off miniseries titled Sons of Star Trek explored an alternate timeline where Jake Sisko and Alexander Rozhenko joined Starfleet.

Unrelated to the plots of the aforementioned comics, Star Trek: Holo-Ween (released near Halloween 2023) is set in TNG era and shows a holodeck malfunction that creates monsters. Star Trek: Picard's Academy narrates the stories of a young Jean-Luc Picard back when he was a student, in stark contrast with the recent live-action series Star Trek: Picard that depicted an aged version of the character. Star Trek: Strange New Worlds: The Scorpius Run is a comic set in Star Trek: Strange New Worlds.

== Crossovers ==
In 2012, IDW published a six-issue limited series crossover featuring the Legion of Super-Heroes from DC Comics. This was followed soon after by the first-ever licensed crossover between the Star Trek franchise and Doctor Who. It was an eight-issue limited series titled Star Trek: The Next Generation/Doctor Who: Assimilation². These were the first of numerous crossover storylines featuring Star Trek characters interacting with characters from various franchises.

In June 2018, it was announced that there will be a Star Trek and Transformers crossover released in September titled Star Trek vs. Transformers.

== Collected editions ==
The various series have been collected in trade paperbacks.

=== Ongoing series ===
==== Star Trek (2011–2016) ====
Flagship series that ran for sixty issues, from 2011 to 2016. The series was marketed as Star Trek: Ongoing to differentiate it from other series.

No.	Issue(s)	Date	Collection	Date	ISBN
1	Where No Man Has Gone Before, Part 1	September 2011	Star Trek, Vol. 1	March 21, 2012	978-1-61377-150-1
2	Where No Man Has Gone Before, Part 2	October 2011	Star Trek, Vol. 1	March 21, 2012	978-1-61377-150-1
3	The Galileo Seven, Part 1	November 2011	Star Trek, Vol. 1	March 21, 2012	978-1-61377-150-1
4	The Galileo Seven, Part 2	December 2011	Star Trek, Vol. 1	March 21, 2012	978-1-61377-150-1
5	Operation: Annihilate, Part 1	January 2012	Star Trek, Vol. 2	July 24, 2012	978-1-61377-286-7
6	Operation: Annihilate, Part 2	February 2012	Star Trek, Vol. 2	July 24, 2012	978-1-61377-286-7
7	Vulcan's Vengeance, Part 1	March 2012	Star Trek, Vol. 2	July 24, 2012	978-1-61377-286-7
8	Vulcan's Vengeance, Part 2	April 2012	Star Trek, Vol. 2	July 24, 2012	978-1-61377-286-7
9	The Return of the Archons, Part 1	May 2012	Star Trek, Vol. 3	November 27, 2012	978-1-61377-515-8
10	The Return of the Archons, Part 2	June 2012	Star Trek, Vol. 3	November 27, 2012	978-1-61377-515-8
11	The Truth About Tribbles, Part 1	July 2012	Star Trek, Vol. 3	November 27, 2012	978-1-61377-515-8
12	The Truth About Tribbles, Part 2	August 2012	Star Trek, Vol. 3	November 27, 2012	978-1-61377-515-8
13	Star Trek, Issue 13	September 2012	Star Trek, Vol. 4	March 19, 2013	978-1-61377-590-5
14	Star Trek, Issue 14	October 2012	Star Trek, Vol. 4	March 19, 2013	978-1-61377-590-5
15	Mirror, Part 1	November 2012	Star Trek, Vol. 4	March 19, 2013	978-1-61377-590-5
16	Mirror, Part 2	December 2012	Star Trek, Vol. 4	March 19, 2013	978-1-61377-590-5
17	Star Trek, Issue 17	January 2013	Star Trek, Vol. 5	July 16, 2013	978-1-61377-687-2
18	Star Trek, Issue 18	February 2013	Star Trek, Vol. 5	July 16, 2013	978-1-61377-687-2
19	Star Trek, Issue 19	March 2013	Star Trek, Vol. 5	July 16, 2013	978-1-61377-687-2
20	Star Trek, Issue 20	April 2013	Star Trek, Vol. 5	July 16, 2013	978-1-61377-687-2
21	After Darkness, Part 1	May 2013	Star Trek, Vol. 6 – After Darkness	November 26, 2013	978-1-61377-796-1
22	After Darkness, Part 2	June 2013	Star Trek, Vol. 6 – After Darkness	November 26, 2013	978-1-61377-796-1
23	After Darkness, Part 3	July 2013	Star Trek, Vol. 6 – After Darkness	November 26, 2013	978-1-61377-796-1
24	Star Trek, Issue 26	August 2013	Star Trek, Vol. 6 – After Darkness	November 26, 2013	978-1-61377-796-1
25	The Khitomer Conflict, Part 1	September 2013	Star Trek, Vol. 7 – The Khitomer Conflict	April 1, 2014	978-1-61377-882-1
26	The Khitomer Conflict, Part 2	October 2013	Star Trek, Vol. 7 – The Khitomer Conflict	April 1, 2014	978-1-61377-882-1
27	The Khitomer Conflict, Part 3	November 2013	Star Trek, Vol. 7 – The Khitomer Conflict	April 1, 2014	978-1-61377-882-1
28	The Khitomer Conflict, Part 4	December 2013	Star Trek, Vol. 7 – The Khitomer Conflict	April 1, 2014	978-1-61377-882-1
29	Parallel Lives, Part 1	January 2014	Star Trek, Vol. 8	October 7, 2014	978-1-63140-021-6
30	Parallel Lives, Part 2	February 2014	Star Trek, Vol. 8	October 7, 2014	978-1-63140-021-6
31	I, Enterprise!, Part 1	March 2014	Star Trek, Vol. 8	October 7, 2014	978-1-63140-021-6
32	I, Enterprise!, Part 2	April 2014	Star Trek, Vol. 8	October 7, 2014	978-1-63140-021-6
33	Lost Apollo, Part 1	May 2014	Star Trek, Vol. 8	October 7, 2014	978-1-63140-021-6
34	Lost Apollo, Part 2	June 2014	Star Trek, Vol. 8	October 7, 2014	978-1-63140-021-6
35	The Q Gambit, Part 1	July 2014	Star Trek, Vol. 9 – The Q Gambit	April 21, 2015	978-1-63140-276-0
36	The Q Gambit, Part 2	August 2014	Star Trek, Vol. 9 – The Q Gambit	April 21, 2015	978-1-63140-276-0
37	The Q Gambit, Part 3	September 2014	Star Trek, Vol. 9 – The Q Gambit	April 21, 2015	978-1-63140-276-0
38	The Q Gambit, Part 4	October 2014	Star Trek, Vol. 9 – The Q Gambit	April 21, 2015	978-1-63140-276-0
39	The Q Gambit, Part 5	November 2014	Star Trek, Vol. 9 – The Q Gambit	April 21, 2015	978-1-63140-276-0
40	The Q Gambit, Part 6	December 2014	Star Trek, Vol. 9 – The Q Gambit	April 21, 2015	978-1-63140-276-0
41	Behemoth, Part 1	January 2015	Star Trek, Vol. 10	September 22, 2015	978-1-63140-381-1
42	Behemoth, Part 2	February 2015	Star Trek, Vol. 10	September 22, 2015	978-1-63140-381-1
43	Eurydice, Part 1	March 2015	Star Trek, Vol. 10	September 22, 2015	978-1-63140-381-1
44	Eurydice, Part 2	April 2015	Star Trek, Vol. 10	September 22, 2015	978-1-63140-381-1
45	Eurydice, Part 3	May 2015	Star Trek, Vol. 10	September 22, 2015	978-1-63140-381-1
46	The Tholian Webs, Part 1	June 2015	Star Trek, Vol. 11	February 2, 2016	978-1-63140-521-1
47	The Tholian Webs, Part 2	July 2015	Star Trek, Vol. 11	February 2, 2016	978-1-63140-521-1
48	Deity, Part 1	August 2015	Star Trek, Vol. 11	February 2, 2016	978-1-63140-521-1
49	Deity, Part 2	September 2015	Star Trek, Vol. 11	February 2, 2016	978-1-63140-521-1
50	Live Evil, Part 1	October 2015	Star Trek, Vol. 12	July 12, 2016	978-1-63140-664-5
51	Live Evil, Part 2	November 2015	Star Trek, Vol. 12	July 12, 2016	978-1-63140-664-5
52	Live Evil, Part 3	December 2015	Star Trek, Vol. 12	July 12, 2016	978-1-63140-664-5
53	Reunion, Part 1	January 2016	Star Trek, Vol. 12	July 12, 2016	978-1-63140-664-5
54	Reunion, Part 2	February 2016	Star Trek, Vol. 12	July 12, 2016	978-1-63140-664-5
55	Legacy of Spock, Part 1	March 2016	Star Trek, Vol. 13	November 22, 2016	978-1-63140-775-8
56	Legacy of Spock, Part 2	April 2016	Star Trek, Vol. 13	November 22, 2016	978-1-63140-775-8
57	Legacy of Spock, Part 3	May 2016	Star Trek, Vol. 13	November 22, 2016	978-1-63140-775-8
58	Legacy of Spock, Part 4	June 2016	Star Trek, Vol. 13	November 22, 2016	978-1-63140-775-8
59	Connection, Part 1	July 2016	Star Trek, Vol. 13	November 22, 2016	978-1-63140-775-8
60	Connection, Part 2	August 2016	Star Trek, Vol. 13	November 22, 2016	978-1-63140-775-8

==== Boldly Go (2016–2018) ====
Star Trek: Boldly Go series depicts events between the conclusion of Star Trek Beyond (2016) and the launch of the newly built USS Enterprise (NCC-1701-A).

No.	Date	Collection	Date	ISBN
1	October 2016	Boldly Go, Vol. 1	July 25, 2016	978-1-63140-923-3
2	November 2016	Boldly Go, Vol. 1	July 25, 2016	978-1-63140-923-3
3	December 2016	Boldly Go, Vol. 1	July 25, 2016	978-1-63140-923-3
4	January 2017	Boldly Go, Vol. 1	July 25, 2016	978-1-63140-923-3
5	February 2017	Boldly Go, Vol. 1	July 25, 2016	978-1-63140-923-3
6	March 2017	Boldly Go, Vol. 1	July 25, 2016	978-1-63140-923-3
7	April 2017	Boldly Go, Vol. 2	January 9, 2018	978-1-68405-103-8
8	May 2017	Boldly Go, Vol. 2	January 9, 2018	978-1-68405-103-8
9	June 2017	Boldly Go, Vol. 2	January 9, 2018	978-1-68405-103-8
10	July 2017	Boldly Go, Vol. 2	January 9, 2018	978-1-68405-103-8
11	August 2017	Boldly Go, Vol. 2	January 9, 2018	978-1-68405-103-8
12	September 2017	Boldly Go, Vol. 2	January 9, 2018	978-1-68405-103-8
13	October 2017	Boldly Go, Vol. 3	May 29, 2018	978-1-68405-248-6
14	November 2017	Boldly Go, Vol. 3	May 29, 2018	978-1-68405-248-6
15	December 2017	Boldly Go, Vol. 3	May 29, 2018	978-1-68405-248-6
16	January 2018	Boldly Go, Vol. 3	May 29, 2018	978-1-68405-248-6
17	February 2018	Boldly Go, Vol. 3	May 29, 2018	978-1-68405-248-6
18	March 2018	Boldly Go, Vol. 3	May 29, 2018	978-1-68405-248-6

==== Star Trek: Year Five (2019–2021) ====
Continues the story of Kirk's Enterprise from the mini-series Star Trek: Year Four (2007).

No.	Issue(s)	Date	Collection	Date	ISBN
1	Odyssey's End, Part 1	April 2019	Star Trek: Year Five – Odyssey's End	February 5, 2020	9781684055685
2	Odyssey's End, Part 2	May 2019	Star Trek: Year Five – Odyssey's End	February 5, 2020	9781684055685
3	Communication Breakdown, Part 1	July 2019	Star Trek: Year Five – Odyssey's End	February 5, 2020	9781684055685
4	Communication Breakdown, Part 2	August 2019	Star Trek: Year Five – Odyssey's End	February 5, 2020	9781684055685
5	The Truth Artifact, Part 1	August 2019	Star Trek: Year Five – Odyssey's End	February 5, 2020	9781684055685
6	The Truth Artifact, Part 2	September 2019	Star Trek: Year Five – Odyssey's End	February 5, 2020	9781684055685
7	Trespasser, Part 1	October 2019	Star Trek: Year Five – The Wine Dark Deep	July 22, 2020	9781684056439
8	Trespasser, Part 2	December 2019	Star Trek: Year Five – The Wine Dark Deep	July 22, 2020	9781684056439
9	The Wine-Dark Deep, Part 1	December 2019	Star Trek: Year Five – The Wine Dark Deep	July 22, 2020	9781684056439
10	The Wine-Dark Deep, Part 2	February 2020	Star Trek: Year Five – The Wine Dark Deep	July 22, 2020	9781684056439
11	The Mission Who Walks Like a Man, Part 1	June 2020	Star Trek: Year Five – The Wine Dark Deep	July 22, 2020	9781684056439
12	The Mission Who Walks Like a Man, Part 2	July 2020	Star Trek: Year Five – The Wine Dark Deep	July 22, 2020	9781684056439
13	Guide of Fire, Part 1	August 2020	Star Trek: Year Five – Weaker Than Man	May 25, 2021	9781684057436
14	Guide of Fire, Part 2	September 2020	Star Trek: Year Five – Weaker Than Man	May 25, 2021	9781684057436
15	Vote Mudd!, Part 1	October 2020	Star Trek: Year Five – Weaker Than Man	May 25, 2021	9781684057436
16	Vote Mudd!, Part 2	November 2020	Star Trek: Year Five – Weaker Than Man	May 25, 2021	9781684057436
17	Weaker Than Man	December 2020	Star Trek: Year Five – Weaker Than Man	May 25, 2021	9781684057436
18	On the Death of a Friend, Part 1	January 2021	Star Trek: Year Five – Weaker Than Man	May 25, 2021	9781684057436
19	On the Death of a Friend, Part 2	February 2021	Star Trek: Year Five – Weaker Than Man	May 25, 2021	9781684057436
Special	Captains of Sea and War	February 2020	Star Trek: Year Five – Experienced in Loss	April 19, 2022	9781684058525
20	Under The Raptor's Wings, Part 1	May 2021	Star Trek: Year Five – Experienced in Loss	April 19, 2022	9781684058525
21	Under The Raptor's Wings, Part 2	June 2021	Star Trek: Year Five – Experienced in Loss	April 19, 2022	9781684058525
22	A Crypt Called Ithaca, Part 1	July 2021	Star Trek: Year Five – Experienced in Loss	April 19, 2022	9781684058525
23	A Crypt Called Ithaca, Part 2	July 2021	Star Trek: Year Five – Experienced in Loss	April 19, 2022	9781684058525
24	A Crypt Called Ithaca, Part 3	August 2021	Star Trek: Year Five – Experienced in Loss	April 19, 2022	9781684058525
25	Epilogue	October 2021	Star Trek: Year Five – Experienced in Loss	April 19, 2022	9781684058525

==== Star Trek (2022) ====
Flagship series that ran for 32 issues, from 2022 to 2025. The series was marketed simply as Star Trek.

No.	Issue(s)	Date	Collection	Date	ISBN
0	A Perfect System (Star Trek, Issue 400)	September 7, 2022	Star Trek, Volume 1: Godshock	July 18, 2023	1684059909
1	Godshock, Part 1	October 26, 2022	Star Trek, Volume 1: Godshock	July 18, 2023	1684059909
2	Godshock, Part 2	November 30, 2022	Star Trek, Volume 1: Godshock	July 18, 2023	1684059909
3	Godshock, Part 3	January 4, 2023	Star Trek, Volume 1: Godshock	July 18, 2023	1684059909
4	Godshock, Part 4	February 1, 2023	Star Trek, Volume 1: Godshock	July 18, 2023	1684059909
5	Godshock, Part 5	March 1, 2023	Star Trek, Volume 1: Godshock	July 18, 2023	1684059909
6	Godshock, Part 6	April 12, 2023	Star Trek, Volume 1: Godshock	July 18, 2023	1684059909
7	The Red Path, Part 1	April 26, 2023	Star Trek, Volume 2: The Red Path	December 5, 2023	9798887240237
8	The Red Path, Part 2	May 17, 2023	Star Trek, Volume 2: The Red Path	December 5, 2023	9798887240237
0	Star Trek Annual (2023)	May 31, 2023	Star Trek, Volume 2: The Red Path	December 5, 2023	9798887240237
9	The Red Path, Part 3	June 14, 2023	Star Trek, Volume 2: The Red Path	December 5, 2023	9798887240237
10	The Red Path, Part 4	July 12, 2023	Star Trek, Volume 2: The Red Path	December 5, 2023	9798887240237
11	Day of Blood, Part 3	August 23, 2023	Star Trek: Day of Blood (Crossover with Star Trek: Defiant)	March 12, 2024	9798887240732
12	Day of Blood, Part 5	September 27, 2023	Star Trek: Day of Blood (Crossover with Star Trek: Defiant)	March 12, 2024	9798887240732
13	Glass and Bones, Part 1	October 25, 2023	Star Trek, Volume 3: Glass and Bone	October 15, 2024	9798887241203
14	Glass and Bones, Part 2	November 22, 2023	Star Trek, Volume 3: Glass and Bone	October 15, 2024	9798887241203
15	Glass and Bones, Part 3	December 20, 2023	Star Trek, Volume 3: Glass and Bone	October 15, 2024	9798887241203
16	Glass and Bones, Part 4	January 17, 2024	Star Trek, Volume 3: Glass and Bone	October 15, 2024	9798887241203
17	Glass and Bones, Part 5	February 21, 2024	Star Trek, Volume 3: Glass and Bone	October 15, 2024	9798887241203
18	Glass and Bones, Part 6	March 20, 2024	Star Trek, Volume 3: Glass and Bone	October 15, 2024	9798887241203
19	Pleroma, Part 1	April 17, 2024	Star Trek, Volume 4: Pleroma	April 15, 2025	979-8887242705
20	Pleroma, Part 2	May 15, 2024	Star Trek, Volume 4: Pleroma	April 15, 2025	979-8887242705
21	Pleroma, Part 3	June 19, 2024	Star Trek, Volume 4: Pleroma	April 15, 2025	979-8887242705
22	Pleroma, Part 4	July 17, 2024	Star Trek, Volume 4: Pleroma	April 15, 2025	979-8887242705
0	Star Trek Annual (2024)	July 17, 2024	Star Trek, Volume 4: Pleroma	April 15, 2025	979-8887242705
23	Pleroma, Part 5	August 21, 2024	Star Trek, Volume 4: Pleroma	April 15, 2025	979-8887242705
24	Pleroma, Part 6	September 25, 2024	Star Trek, Volume 4: Pleroma	April 15, 2025	979-8887242705
25	When the Walls Fell, Part 1	October 16, 2024	Star Trek, Volume 5: When the Walls Fell	September 30, 2025	979-8887243573
26	When the Walls Fell, Part 2	November 20, 2024	Star Trek, Volume 5: When the Walls Fell	September 30, 2025	979-8887243573
27	When the Walls Fell, Part 3	December 18, 2024	Star Trek, Volume 5: When the Walls Fell	September 30, 2025	979-8887243573
28	When the Walls Fell, Part 4	January 22, 2025	Star Trek, Volume 5: When the Walls Fell	September 30, 2025	979-8887243573
29	When the Walls Fell, Part 5	February 19, 2025	Star Trek, Volume 5: When the Walls Fell	September 30, 2025	979-8887243573
30	When the Walls Fell, Part 6	March 5, 2025	Star Trek, Volume 5: When the Walls Fell	September 30, 2025	979-8887243573
31	Lore War, Part 3	April 23, 2025	Star Trek: Lore War (Crossover with Star Trek: Defiant)	January 13, 2026	979-8887243597
32	Lore War, Part 5	June 4, 2025	Star Trek: Lore War (Crossover with Star Trek: Defiant)	January 13, 2026	979-8887243597

==== Star Trek: Defiant ====
Spinoff of Star Trek (2022) that ran for 27 issues

No.	Issue(s)	Date	Collection	Date	ISBN
1	Defiant, Issue 1	March 8, 2023	Star Trek: Defiant, Volume 1	November 14, 2023	9798887240282
2	Defiant, Issue 2	April 12, 2023	Star Trek: Defiant, Volume 1	November 14, 2023	9798887240282
3	Defiant, Issue 3	May 10, 2023	Star Trek: Defiant, Volume 1	November 14, 2023	9798887240282
4	Defiant, Issue 4	June 7, 2023	Star Trek: Defiant, Volume 1	November 14, 2023	9798887240282
5	Defiant, Issue 5	July 5, 2023	Star Trek: Defiant, Volume 1	November 14, 2023	9798887240282
6	Day of Blood, Part 2	August 2, 2023	Star Trek: Day of Blood	March 12, 2024	9798887240732
7	Day of Blood, Part 4		Star Trek: Day of Blood	March 12, 2024	9798887240732
8	Another Piece of the Action, Part 1	October 4, 2023	Star Trek: Defiant, Volume 2: Another Piece of the Action	June 18, 2024	9798887241227
9	Another Piece of the Action, Part 2	November 8, 2023	Star Trek: Defiant, Volume 2: Another Piece of the Action	June 18, 2024	9798887241227
10	Another Piece of the Action, Part 3	December 20, 2023	Star Trek: Defiant, Volume 2: Another Piece of the Action	June 18, 2024	9798887241227
0	Star Trek: Defiant: Annual	January 24, 2024	Star Trek: Defiant, Volume 2: Another Piece of the Action	June 18, 2024	9798887241227
11	Another Piece of the Action Part 4	February 7, 2024	Star Trek: Defiant, Volume 2: Another Piece of the Action	June 18, 2024	9798887241227

=== Limited series ===
==== The Next Generation (2007–2013) ====
Comics based on Star Trek: The Next Generation.

Issue(s)	Date	Collection	Date	ISBN
The Space Between, Part 1	January 2007	The Space Between	September 25, 2007	978-1-60010-116-8
The Space Between, Part 2	February 2007	The Space Between	September 25, 2007	978-1-60010-116-8
The Space Between, Part 3	March 2007	The Space Between	September 25, 2007	978-1-60010-116-8
The Space Between, Part 4	April 2007	The Space Between	September 25, 2007	978-1-60010-116-8
The Space Between, Part 5	May 2007	The Space Between	September 25, 2007	978-1-60010-116-8
The Space Between, Part 6	June 2007	The Space Between	September 25, 2007	978-1-60010-116-8
Intelligence Gathering, Part 1	January 2008	Intelligence Gathering	September 9, 2008	978-1-60010-199-1
Intelligence Gathering, Part 2	February 2008	Intelligence Gathering	September 9, 2008	978-1-60010-199-1
Intelligence Gathering, Part 3	March 2008	Intelligence Gathering	September 9, 2008	978-1-60010-199-1
Intelligence Gathering, Part 4	April 2008	Intelligence Gathering	September 9, 2008	978-1-60010-199-1
Intelligence Gathering, Part 5	May 2008	Intelligence Gathering	September 9, 2008	978-1-60010-199-1
The Last Generation, Part 1	November 2008	The Last Generation (Myriad Universes)	July 21, 2009	978-1-60010-475-6
The Last Generation, Part 2	December 2008	The Last Generation (Myriad Universes)	July 21, 2009	978-1-60010-475-6
The Last Generation, Part 3	January 2009	The Last Generation (Myriad Universes)	July 21, 2009	978-1-60010-475-6
The Last Generation, Part 4	February 2009	The Last Generation (Myriad Universes)	July 21, 2009	978-1-60010-475-6
The Last Generation, Part 5	March 2009	The Last Generation (Myriad Universes)	July 21, 2009	978-1-60010-475-6
Ghosts, Part 1	November 2009	Ghosts	June 22, 2010	978-1-60010-682-8
Ghosts, Part 2	December 2009	Ghosts	June 22, 2010	978-1-60010-682-8
Ghosts, Part 3	January 2010	Ghosts	June 22, 2010	978-1-60010-682-8
Ghosts, Part 4	February 2010	Ghosts	June 22, 2010	978-1-60010-682-8
Ghosts, Part 5	March 2010	Ghosts	June 22, 2010	978-1-60010-682-8
Hive, Part 1	September 2012	Hive	April 9, 2013	978-1-61377-566-0
Hive, Part 2	October 2012	Hive	April 9, 2013	978-1-61377-566-0
Hive, Part 3	November 2012	Hive	April 9, 2013	978-1-61377-566-0
Hive, Part 4	February 2013	Hive	April 9, 2013	978-1-61377-566-0

==== Klingons: Blood Will Tell (2007) ====
Star Trek: Klingons – Blood Will Tell miniseries explores prominent events in Star Trek history from a Klingon perspective.

No.	Issue(s)	Date	Collection	Date	ISBN
1	"Against Their Nature"	April 2007	Klingons: Blood Will Tell	December 11, 2007	978-1-60010-108-3
2	"Beneath the Skin"	May 2007	Klingons: Blood Will Tell	December 11, 2007	978-1-60010-108-3
3	"The Order of Things"	June 2007	Klingons: Blood Will Tell	December 11, 2007	978-1-60010-108-3
4	"Blood Reign O'er Me"	July 2007	Klingons: Blood Will Tell	December 11, 2007	978-1-60010-108-3
5	"Losses"	August 2007	Klingons: Blood Will Tell	December 11, 2007	978-1-60010-108-3

==== Star Trek: The Original Series (2007–2014) ====
Comics based on Star Trek: The Original Series.

Issue(s)	Date	Collection	Date	ISBN
Year Four, Part 1	July 2007	Year Four	March 18, 2008	978-1-60010-161-8
Year Four, Part 2	August 2007	Year Four	March 18, 2008	978-1-60010-161-8
Year Four, Part 3	September 2007	Year Four	March 18, 2008	978-1-60010-161-8
Year Four, Part 4	October 2007	Year Four	March 18, 2008	978-1-60010-161-8
Year Four, Part 5	November 2007	Year Four	March 18, 2008	978-1-60010-161-8
Year Four, Part 6	January 2008	Year Four	March 18, 2008	978-1-60010-161-8
The Enterprise Experiment, Part 1	April 2008	Year Four: The Enterprise Experiment (Note: The use of an en dash and or a colon in the title is inconsistent among primary sources.)	November 18, 2008	978-1-60010-279-0
The Enterprise Experiment, Part 2	May 2008	Year Four: The Enterprise Experiment	November 18, 2008	978-1-60010-279-0
The Enterprise Experiment, Part 3	June 2008	Year Four: The Enterprise Experiment	November 18, 2008	978-1-60010-279-0
The Enterprise Experiment, Part 4	July 2008	Year Four: The Enterprise Experiment	November 18, 2008	978-1-60010-279-0
The Enterprise Experiment, Part 5	August 2008	Year Four: The Enterprise Experiment	November 18, 2008	978-1-60010-279-0
Assignment: Earth, Part 1	May 2008	Assignment: Earth	December 16, 2008	978-1-60010-291-2
Assignment: Earth, Part 2	June 2008	Assignment: Earth	December 16, 2008	978-1-60010-291-2
Assignment: Earth, Part 3	July 2008	Assignment: Earth	December 16, 2008	978-1-60010-291-2
Assignment: Earth, Part 4	August 2008	Assignment: Earth	December 16, 2008	978-1-60010-291-2
Assignment: Earth, Part 5	September 2008	Assignment: Earth	December 16, 2008	978-1-60010-291-2
Mirror Images, Part 1	June 2008	Mirror Images	February 17, 2009	978-1-60010-293-6
Mirror Images, Part 2	July 2008	Mirror Images	February 17, 2009	978-1-60010-293-6
Mirror Images, Part 3	September 2008	Mirror Images	February 17, 2009	978-1-60010-293-6
Mirror Images, Part 4	October 2008	Mirror Images	February 17, 2009	978-1-60010-293-6
Mirror Images, Part 5	November 2008	Mirror Images	February 17, 2009	978-1-60010-293-6
Crew, Part 1	March 2009	Crew	October 27, 2009	978-1-60010-554-8
Crew, Part 2	April 2009	Crew	October 27, 2009	978-1-60010-554-8
Crew, Part 3	May 2009	Crew	October 27, 2009	978-1-60010-554-8
Crew, Part 4	June 2009	Crew	October 27, 2009	978-1-60010-554-8
Crew, Part 5	July 2009	Crew	October 27, 2009	978-1-60010-554-8
Mission's End, Part 1	March 2009	Mission's End	November 3, 2009	978-1-60010-540-1
Mission's End, Part 2	April 2009	Mission's End	November 3, 2009	978-1-60010-540-1
Mission's End, Part 3	May 2009	Mission's End	November 3, 2009	978-1-60010-540-1
Mission's End, Part 4	June 2009	Mission's End	November 3, 2009	978-1-60010-540-1
Mission's End, Part 5	July 2009	Mission's End	November 3, 2009	978-1-60010-540-1
"Weeds"	April 2010	Leonard McCoy, Frontier Doctor	October 27, 2010	9781600107481
"Error"	May 2010	Leonard McCoy, Frontier Doctor	October 27, 2010	9781600107481
"Medics"	June 2010	Leonard McCoy, Frontier Doctor	October 27, 2010	9781600107481
"Hosts/Scalpel"	July 2010	Leonard McCoy, Frontier Doctor	October 27, 2010	9781600107481
"Uncertain Prescriptions"	June 2010	Burden of Knowledge	December 14, 2010	978-1600108037
"A Failure to Communicate"	July 2010	Burden of Knowledge	December 14, 2010	978-1600108037
"A Matter of Perspective"	August 2010	Burden of Knowledge	December 14, 2010	978-1600108037
"The Burden of Knowledge"	September 2010	Burden of Knowledge	December 14, 2010	978-1600108037
"The First Six Months"	October 2010	Khan: Ruling in Hell	April 19, 2011	978-1-60010-909-6
"Holding Out Hope"	November 2010	Khan: Ruling in Hell	April 19, 2011	978-1-60010-909-6
Ruling in Hell, Issue 3	December 2010	Khan: Ruling in Hell	April 19, 2011	978-1-60010-909-6
Ruling in Hell, Issue 4	January 2011	Khan: Ruling in Hell	April 19, 2011	978-1-60010-909-6
Echoes, Issue 1	May 2023	The Motion Picture - Echoes	March 27, 2024	
Echoes, Issue 2	June 2023	The Motion Picture - Echoes	March 27, 2024	
Echoes, Issue 3	July 2023	The Motion Picture - Echoes	March 27, 2024	
Echoes, Issue 4	August 2023	The Motion Picture - Echoes	March 27, 2024	

==== Romulans: Pawns of War (2008–2010) ====
Star Trek: Romulans – Pawns of War, by John Byrne, depict the lives of Romulan military officers. Originally released as two series, Hollow Crown (2008) and Schisms (2009). Both were collected in Pawns of War (2010), which included a special issue, Balance of Terror, an adaptation of the episode of the same name as told from the Romulan perspective.

Issue(s)	Date	Collection	Date	ISBN
Hollow Crown, Part 1	September 2008	Romulans: Pawns of War	March 2, 2010	978-1-60010-369-8
Hollow Crown, Part 2	October 2008	Romulans: Pawns of War	March 2, 2010	978-1-60010-369-8
Balance of Terror (exclusive to collected edition)	March 2, 2010	Romulans: Pawns of War	March 2, 2010	978-1-60010-369-8
Schisms, Part 1	September 2009	Romulans: Pawns of War	March 2, 2010	978-1-60010-369-8
Schisms, Part 2	October 2009	Romulans: Pawns of War	March 2, 2010	978-1-60010-369-8
Schisms, Part 3	November 2009	Romulans: Pawns of War	March 2, 2010	978-1-60010-369-8

==== New Frontier: Turnaround (2008) ====
Star Trek: New Frontier – Turnaround is a five-part miniseries written by Peter David.

No.	Date	Collection	Date	ISBN
1	March 2008	New Frontier	October 14, 2018	978-1-60010-266-0
2	April 2008	New Frontier	October 14, 2018	978-1-60010-266-0
3	May 2008	New Frontier	October 14, 2018	978-1-60010-266-0
4	June 2008	New Frontier	October 14, 2018	978-1-60010-266-0
5	July 2008	New Frontier	October 14, 2018	978-1-60010-266-0

==== Deep Space Nine (2009–2010) ====
Comics based on Star Trek: Deep Space Nine.

No.	Issue(s)	Date	Collection	Date	ISBN
1	"Fool's Gold, Issue 1"	December 2009	Star Trek: Deep Space Nine - Fool's Gold	August 10, 2010	978-1600106996
2	"Fool's Gold, Issue 2"	January 2010	Star Trek: Deep Space Nine - Fool's Gold	August 10, 2010	978-1600106996
3	"Fool's Gold, Issue 3"	February 2010	Star Trek: Deep Space Nine - Fool's Gold	August 10, 2010	978-1600106996
4	"Fool's Gold, Issue 4"	March 2010	Star Trek: Deep Space Nine - Fool's Gold	August 10, 2010	978-1600106996
1	"Too Long a Sacrifice, Issue 1"	July 15, 2020	Star Trek: Deep Space Nine - Too Long a Sacrifice	January 27, 2021	1684057353
2	"Too Long a Sacrifice, Issue 2"	August 19, 2020	Star Trek: Deep Space Nine - Too Long a Sacrifice	January 27, 2021	1684057353
3	"Too Long a Sacrifice, Issue 3"	October 7, 2020	Star Trek: Deep Space Nine - Too Long a Sacrifice	January 27, 2021	1684057353
4	"Too Long a Sacrifice, Issue 4"	November 11, 2020	Star Trek: Deep Space Nine - Too Long a Sacrifice	January 27, 2021	1684057353
1	"The Dog of War, Issue 1"	April 5, 2023	Star Trek: Deep Space Nine - The Dog of War	February 13, 2024	9798887240749
2	"The Dog of War, Issue 2"	May 23, 2023	Star Trek: Deep Space Nine - The Dog of War	February 13, 2024	9798887240749
3	"The Dog of War, Issue 3"	June 7, 2023	Star Trek: Deep Space Nine - The Dog of War	February 13, 2024	9798887240749
4	"The Dog of War, Issue 4"	July 5, 2023	Star Trek: Deep Space Nine - The Dog of War	February 13, 2024	9798887240749
5	"The Dog of War, Issue 5"	August 2, 2023	Star Trek: Deep Space Nine - The Dog of War	February 13, 2024	9798887240749

==== Kelvin Universe (2009–2016) ====
Comics based on Star Trek (2009), and its sequel films: Into Darkness (2013) and Beyond (2016). Marketed as part of the "Kelvin Universe" or "Kelvin Timeline".

Issue(s)	Date	Collection	Date	ISBN
Countdown, Part 1	January 2009	Countdown	March 31, 2009	978-1-60010-420-6
Countdown, Part 2	February 2009	Countdown	March 31, 2009	978-1-60010-420-6
Countdown, Part 3	March 2009	Countdown	March 31, 2009	978-1-60010-420-6
Countdown, Part 4	April 2009	Countdown	March 31, 2009	978-1-60010-420-6
Reflections, Part 1	July 2009	Spock: Reflections	January 19, 2010	978-1-60010-590-6
Reflections, Part 2	August 2009	Spock: Reflections	January 19, 2010	978-1-60010-590-6
Reflections, Part 3	September 2009	Spock: Reflections	January 19, 2010	978-1-60010-590-6
Reflections, Part 4	October 2009	Spock: Reflections	January 19, 2010	978-1-60010-590-6
Nero, Part 1	August 2009	Nero	February 23, 2010	978-1-60010-603-3
Nero, Part 2	September 2009	Nero	February 23, 2010	978-1-60010-603-3
Nero, Part 3	October 2009	Nero	February 23, 2010	978-1-60010-603-3
Nero, Part 4	November 2009	Nero	February 23, 2010	978-1-60010-603-3
Star Trek, Part 1	February 2010	Star Trek: Official Motion Picture Adaptation	October 19, 2010	978-1-60010-765-8
Star Trek, Part 2	March 2010	Star Trek: Official Motion Picture Adaptation	October 19, 2010	978-1-60010-765-8
Star Trek, Part 3	April 2010	Star Trek: Official Motion Picture Adaptation	October 19, 2010	978-1-60010-765-8
Star Trek, Part 4	May 2010	Star Trek: Official Motion Picture Adaptation	October 19, 2010	978-1-60010-765-8
Star Trek, Part 5	July 2010	Star Trek: Official Motion Picture Adaptation	October 19, 2010	978-1-60010-765-8
Star Trek, Part 6	August 2010	Star Trek: Official Motion Picture Adaptation	October 19, 2010	978-1-60010-765-8
Countdown to Darkness, Issue 1	January 2013	Star Trek: Countdown to Darkness	April 10, 2013	9781613776230
Countdown to Darkness, Issue 2	February 2013	Star Trek: Countdown to Darkness	April 10, 2013	9781613776230
Countdown to Darkness, Issue 3	March 2013	Star Trek: Countdown to Darkness	April 10, 2013	9781613776230
Countdown to Darkness, Issue 4	April 2013	Star Trek: Countdown to Darkness	April 10, 2013	9781613776230
Khan, Part 1	October 2013	Khan	June 3, 2014	978-1-61377-895-1
Khan, Part 2	November 2013	Khan	June 3, 2014	978-1-61377-895-1
Khan, Part 3	December 2013	Khan	June 3, 2014	978-1-61377-895-1
Khan, Part 4	January 2014	Khan	June 3, 2014	978-1-61377-895-1
Khan, Part 5	February 2014	Khan	June 3, 2014	978-1-61377-895-1
Starfleet Academy, Part 1	December 2015	Starfleet Academy	August 16, 2016	978-1-63140-663-8
Starfleet Academy, Part 2	January 2016	Starfleet Academy	August 16, 2016	978-1-63140-663-8
Starfleet Academy, Part 3	February 2016	Starfleet Academy	August 16, 2016	978-1-63140-663-8
Starfleet Academy, Part 4	March 2016	Starfleet Academy	August 16, 2016	978-1-63140-663-8
Starfleet Academy, Part 5	April 2016	Starfleet Academy	August 16, 2016	978-1-63140-663-8
Manifest Destiny, Issue 1	April 2016	Manifest Destiny	July 5, 2016	9781631406348
Manifest Destiny, Issue 2	May 2016	Manifest Destiny	July 5, 2016	9781631406348
Manifest Destiny, Issue 3	May 2016	Manifest Destiny	July 5, 2016	9781631406348
Manifest Destiny, Issue 4	June 2016	Manifest Destiny	July 5, 2016	9781631406348

==== New Visions (2013–2019) ====
Star Trek: New Visions series that utilized imagery from the Original Series to create original stories. Stills from episodes were manipulated using modern photo editing software tools and effects. Written by John Byrne.

No.	Issue(s)	Date	Collection	Date	ISBN
1	"The Mirror, Cracked" (Note: Star Trek: New Visions, Issue 1 (2014) was assigned ISBN 978-1-63140-002-5.)	May 2014	New Visions, Vol. 1	October 21, 2014	978-1-63140-039-1
2	"Time's Echo" (Note: Star Trek: New Visions, Issue 2 (2014) was assigned ISBN 978-1-63140-119-0.)	August 2014	New Visions, Vol. 1	October 21, 2014	978-1-63140-039-1
3	"Cry Vengeance"	October 2014	New Visions, Vol. 2	June 30, 2015	978-1-63140-367-5
4	"Made Out of Mudd"	December 2014	New Visions, Vol. 2	June 30, 2015	978-1-63140-367-5
5	"A Scent of Ghosts"	March 2015	New Visions, Vol. 2	June 30, 2015	978-1-63140-367-5
6	"Resistance"	May 2015	New Visions, Vol. 3	March 8, 2016	978-1-63140-536-5
7	"1971/4860.2"	July 2015	New Visions, Vol. 3	March 8, 2016	978-1-63140-536-5
8	"The Survival Equation"	September 2015	New Visions, Vol. 3	March 8, 2016	978-1-63140-536-5
9	"The Hollow Man"	November 2015	New Visions, Vol. 4	December 27, 2016	978-1-63140-805-2
10	"Mister Chekov"	January 2016	New Visions, Vol. 4	December 27, 2016	978-1-63140-805-2
11	"Of Woman Born"	May 2016	New Visions, Vol. 4	December 27, 2016	978-1-63140-805-2
12	"Swarm"	September 2016	New Visions, Vol. 5	September 5, 2017	978-1-68405-088-8
13	"The Hidden Face"	December 2016	New Visions, Vol. 5	September 5, 2017	978-1-68405-088-8
14	"Sam"	February 2017	New Visions, Vol. 5	September 5, 2017	978-1-68405-088-8
15	"The Traveler"	March 2017	New Visions, Vol. 6	January 30, 2018	978-1-68405-176-2
16	"Time Out of Joint"	June 2017	New Visions, Vol. 6	January 30, 2018	978-1-68405-176-2
17	"All the Ages Frozen"	August 2017	New Visions, Vol. 6	January 30, 2018	978-1-68405-176-2
18	"What Pain It Is to Drown"	October 2017	New Visions, Vol. 7	August 21, 2018	978-1-68405-280-6
19	"The Hunger"	December 2017	New Visions, Vol. 7	August 21, 2018	978-1-68405-280-6
20	"Isolation"	February 2018	New Visions, Vol. 7	August 21, 2018	978-1-68405-280-6
21	"The Enemy of My Enemy"	April 2018	New Visions, Vol. 8	February 5, 2019	978-1-68405-377-3
22	"An Unexpected Yesterday"	June 2018	New Visions, Vol. 8	February 5, 2019	978-1-68405-377-3

==== City on the Edge of Forever (2014) ====
Star Trek: Harlan Ellison's The City on the Edge of Forever – The Original Teleplay is a commemorative miniseries which adapts the titular television episode script as originally written by Harlan Ellison.

No.	Date	Collection	Date	ISBN
1	June 2014	The City on the Edge of Forever (Note: Full title: Star Trek: Harlan Ellison's The City on the Edge of Forever – The Original Teleplay, Vol 1. The use of an en dash or colon in the title is inconsistent among primary sources.)	February 17, 2015	978-1-63140-206-7
2	July 2014	The City on the Edge of Forever	February 17, 2015	978-1-63140-206-7
3	August 2014	The City on the Edge of Forever	February 17, 2015	978-1-63140-206-7
4	September 2014	The City on the Edge of Forever	February 17, 2015	978-1-63140-206-7
5	October 2014	The City on the Edge of Forever	February 17, 2015	978-1-63140-206-7

==== Discovery (2017–2018) ====
Star Trek: Discovery is a series based on the television series of the same name.

Each issue of Star Trek: Discovery – Adventures in the 32nd Century focuses on different member of the Discovery crew adjusting to the 32nd Century.

Issue(s)	Date	Collection	Date	ISBN
The Light of Kahless, Part 1	October 2017	The Light of Kahless	September 4, 2018	978-1-63140-989-9
The Light of Kahless, Part 2	November 2017	The Light of Kahless	September 4, 2018	978-1-63140-989-9
The Light of Kahless, Part 3	December 2017	The Light of Kahless	September 4, 2018	978-1-63140-989-9
The Light of Kahless, Part 4	January 2018	The Light of Kahless	September 4, 2018	978-1-63140-989-9
Succession, Part 1	April 2018	Succession	November 6, 2018	978-1-68405-360-5
Succession, Part 2	May 2018	Succession	November 6, 2018	978-1-68405-360-5
Succession, Part 3	June 2018	Succession	November 6, 2018	978-1-68405-360-5
Succession, Part 4	July 2018	Succession	November 6, 2018	978-1-68405-360-5
Aftermath, Part 1	August 2019	Aftermath	April 7, 2020	978-1-68405-650-7
Aftermath, Part 2	September 2019	Aftermath	April 7, 2020	978-1-68405-650-7
Aftermath, Part 3	October 2019	Aftermath	April 7, 2020	978-1-68405-650-7
"Grudge the Cat"	March 2022	Adventures in the 32nd Century	TBA	TBA
"Ensign Adira Tal"	April 2022	Adventures in the 32nd Century	TBA	TBA
"Lt. Commander Detmer"	May 2022	Adventures in the 32nd Century	TBA	TBA
"Science Officer Linus"	June 2022	Adventures in the 32nd Century	TBA	TBA

==== The Q Conflict (2019) ====
Crossover between, The Original Series, The Next Generation, Deep Space Nine, and Voyager.

==== Mirror Universe Collection (2017–2019) ====
The three limited series – Mirror Broken (2017), Through the Mirror (2018), and Terra Incognita (2018) – focus on Jean-Luc Picard and the crew of the ISS Enterprise in the Mirror Universe. An omnibus collecting the three series was later released in 2021.

Issue(s)	Date	Collection	Date	ISBN
Trade paperback
Mirror Broken, Issue 0	May 6, 2017	Star Trek: The Next Generation - Mirror Broken	March 27, 2018	9781684051458
Mirror Broken, Issue 1	May 10, 2017	Star Trek: The Next Generation - Mirror Broken	March 27, 2018	9781684051458
Mirror Broken, Issue 2	June 10, 2017	Star Trek: The Next Generation - Mirror Broken	March 27, 2018	9781684051458
Mirror Broken, Issue 3	August 14, 2017	Star Trek: The Next Generation - Mirror Broken	March 27, 2018	9781684051458
Mirror Broken, Issue 4	October 10, 2017	Star Trek: The Next Generation - Mirror Broken	March 27, 2018	9781684051458
Mirror Broken, Issue 5	December 6, 2017	Star Trek: The Next Generation - Mirror Broken	March 27, 2018	9781684051458
Through the Mirror, Issue 1	May 2, 2018	Star Trek: The Next Generation - Through the Mirror	October 9, 2018	9781684053438
Through the Mirror, Issue 2	May 9, 2018	Star Trek: The Next Generation - Through the Mirror	October 9, 2018	9781684053438
Through the Mirror, Issue 3	May 16, 2018	Star Trek: The Next Generation - Through the Mirror	October 9, 2018	9781684053438
Through the Mirror, Issue 4	May 23, 2018	Star Trek: The Next Generation - Through the Mirror	October 9, 2018	9781684053438
Through the Mirror, Issue 5	May 30, 2018	Star Trek: The Next Generation - Through the Mirror	October 9, 2018	9781684053438
Terra Incognita, Issue 1	July 25, 2018	Star Trek: The Next Generation - Terra Incognita	April 30, 2019	9781684054299
Terra Incognita, Issue 2	August 22, 2018	Star Trek: The Next Generation - Terra Incognita	April 30, 2019	9781684054299
Terra Incognita, Issue 3	September 26, 2018	Star Trek: The Next Generation - Terra Incognita	April 30, 2019	9781684054299
Terra Incognita, Issue 4	October 24, 2018	Star Trek: The Next Generation - Terra Incognita	April 30, 2019	9781684054299
Terra Incognita, Issue 5	December 5, 2018	Star Trek: The Next Generation - Terra Incognita	April 30, 2019	9781684054299
Terra Incognita, Issue 6	January 23, 2019	Star Trek: The Next Generation - Terra Incognita	April 30, 2019	9781684054299
Omnibus
Mirror Broken #0-5, Through the Mirror #1-5, Terra Incognita #1-6	2017–2019	Star Trek: The Next Generation - Mirror Universe Collection	June 8, 2021	9781684057641

==== Voyager (2020–2021) ====
Comics based on Star Trek: Voyager.

Issue(s)	Date	Collection	Date	ISBN
1	November 18, 2020	Star Trek: Voyager - Seven's Reckoning	August 11, 2021	1684058120
2	December 16, 2020	Star Trek: Voyager - Seven's Reckoning	August 11, 2021	1684058120
3	January 20, 2021	Star Trek: Voyager - Seven's Reckoning	August 11, 2021	1684058120
4	February 10, 2021	Star Trek: Voyager - Seven's Reckoning	August 11, 2021	1684058120

==== The Mirror War (2021–2022) ====
Star Trek: The Mirror War continues the story of Mirror Universe's Jean-Luc Picard and the crew of the ISS Enterprise; set after the previous mini-series Mirror Broken (2017), Through the Mirror (2018), and Terra Incognita (2018). The series is scheduled to have eight issues with an additional four tie-in specials focused individual crew members.

Issue(s)	Date	Collection	Date	ISBN
1	October 2021	Star Trek: The Mirror War	April 2023	9781649361134
2	November 2021	Star Trek: The Mirror War	April 2023	9781649361134
3	January 2022	Star Trek: The Mirror War	April 2023	9781649361134
4	February 2022	Star Trek: The Mirror War	April 2023	9781649361134
5	April 2022	Star Trek: The Mirror War	April 2023	9781649361134
6	May 2022	Star Trek: The Mirror War	April 2023	9781649361134
7	July 2022	Star Trek: The Mirror War	April 2023	9781649361134
8	August 2022	Star Trek: The Mirror War	April 2023	9781649361134
0	September 2021	Star Trek: Warriors of the Mirror War	May 2023	9781649361196
Data	December 2021	Star Trek: Warriors of the Mirror War	May 2023	9781649361196
Geordi	March 2022	Star Trek: Warriors of the Mirror War	May 2023	9781649361196
Sisko	June 2022	Star Trek: Warriors of the Mirror War	May 2023	9781649361196
Troi	September 2022	Star Trek: Warriors of the Mirror War	May 2023	9781649361196

==== Star Trek: Lower Decks ====
Star Trek: Lower Decks continues the story of the Lower Deckers and senior officers of the U.S.S. Cerritos; set before the last season of Lower Decks.

No.	Issue(s)	Date	Collection	Date	ISBN
1	All in a Sea of Wonder	September 14, 2022	Star Trek: Lower Decks	May 2, 2023	1684059623
2	All in a Sea of Wonder	October 12, 2022	Star Trek: Lower Decks	May 2, 2023	1684059623
3	All in a Sea of Wonder	November 9, 2022	Star Trek: Lower Decks	May 2, 2023	1684059623
Star Trek: Lower Decks - Warp Your Own Way				October 22, 2024	9798887241548
1	Lower Decks, Issue 1	November 13, 2024	Star Trek: Lower Decks, Vol. 1: Second Contact	September 16, 2025	
2	Lower Decks, Issue 2	December 18, 2024	Star Trek: Lower Decks, Vol. 1: Second Contact	September 16, 2025	
3	Lower Decks, Issue 3	January 15, 2025	Star Trek: Lower Decks, Vol. 1: Second Contact	September 16, 2025	
4	Lower Decks, Issue 4	February 12, 2025	Star Trek: Lower Decks, Vol. 1: Second Contact	September 16, 2025	
5	Lower Decks, Issue 5	March 12, 2025	Star Trek: Lower Decks, Vol. 1: Second Contact	September 16, 2025	
6	Lower Decks, Issue 6	April 9, 2025	Star Trek: Lower Decks, Vol. 1: Second Contact	September 16, 2025	
7	Yesterday's Beta Shift	May 14, 2025			
8	Yesterday's Beta Shift	June 11, 2025			

=== Anthologies ===
==== Alien Spotlight (2007–2010) ====
Star Trek: Alien Spotlight series collects issues featuring popular species from the Star Trek universe.

No.	Issue(s)	Date	Collection	Date	ISBN
1	The Gorn	September 2007	Alien Spotlight, Vol. 1	May 27, 2008	978-1-60010-179-3
2	The Vulcans	October 2007	Alien Spotlight, Vol. 1	May 27, 2008	978-1-60010-179-3
3	The Andorians	November 2007	Alien Spotlight, Vol. 1	May 27, 2008	978-1-60010-179-3
4	Orions	December 2007	Alien Spotlight, Vol. 1	May 27, 2008	978-1-60010-179-3
5	Borg	January 2008	Alien Spotlight, Vol. 1	May 27, 2008	978-1-60010-179-3
6	Romulans	February 2008	Alien Spotlight, Vol. 1	May 27, 2008	978-1-60010-179-3
1	Tribbles	March 2009	Alien Spotlight, Vol. 2	March 23, 2010	978-1-60010-612-5
2	Klingons	April 2009	Alien Spotlight, Vol. 2	March 23, 2010	978-1-60010-612-5
3	Romulans	May 2009	Alien Spotlight, Vol. 2	March 23, 2010	978-1-60010-612-5
4	Q	August 2009	Alien Spotlight, Vol. 2	March 23, 2010	978-1-60010-612-5
5	Cardassians	December 2009	Alien Spotlight, Vol. 2	March 23, 2010	978-1-60010-612-5

==== Captain's Log (2010) ====
Star Trek: Captain's Log is a four-issue anthology series, spanning multiple eras.

No.	Date	Collection	Date	ISBN
"Sulu"	January 2010	Star Trek: Captain's Log	March 2011	9781600108877
"Harriman"	May 2010	Star Trek: Captain's Log	March 2011	9781600108877
"Pike"	September 2010	Star Trek: Captain's Log	March 2011	9781600108877
"Jellico"	October 2010	Star Trek: Captain's Log	March 2011	9781600108877

==== Waypoint (2016–2019) ====
Star Trek: Waypoint is a six-issue anthology series, spanning multiple eras. Two one-shot, special issues have also been published.

No.	Date	Collection	Date	ISBN
1	September 2016	Waypoint	November 28, 2017	978-1-68405-017-8
2	November 2016	Waypoint	November 28, 2017	978-1-68405-017-8
3	January 2017	Waypoint	November 28, 2017	978-1-68405-017-8
4	March 2017	Waypoint	November 28, 2017	978-1-68405-017-8
5	May 2017	Waypoint	November 28, 2017	978-1-68405-017-8
6	July 2017	Waypoint	November 28, 2017	978-1-68405-017-8

==== Aliens (2022) ====
The Alien Spotlight series was relaunched in 2022.

No.	Issue(s)	Date	Collection	Date	ISBN
1	Star Trek: Klingons	March 2022	Star Trek: Aliens	February 14, 2023	978-1-68405-969-0
2	Star Trek: Ferengi	April 2022	Star Trek: Aliens	February 14, 2023	978-1-68405-969-0
3	Star Trek: Trill	August 2022	Star Trek: Aliens	February 14, 2023	978-1-68405-969-0

=== Reprints, specials and other collections ===
==== Special issues (2008–2020) ====
Issue	Collection	Date	ISBN
Focus on Star Trek	Year Four, Vol. 1	March 18, 2008	978-1-60010-161-8
Star Trek Annual (Note: Star Trek Annual 2013 was reprinted as Star Trek: Strange New Worlds, and Star Trek: New Visions – Strange New Worlds.)	New Visions, Vol. 1	October 21, 2014	978-1-63140-039-1
Flesh and Stone	Star Trek, Vol. 11	February 2, 2016	978-1-63140-521-1
Star Trek: The Next Generation - Mirror Broken: Origin of Data	Loot Crate exclusive issue	October 16, 2017	
Star Trek: Discovery Annual	Succession	November 6, 2018	978-1-68405-360-5
The Cage	New Visions, Vol. 8	February 5, 2019	978-1-68405-377-3
Star Trek: Sky's the Limit	Blu-ray box set exclusive	October 15, 2019	
Star Trek: Voyager - Mirrors and Smoke		December 11, 2019	
Star Trek: Discovery - Captain Saru	Aftermath	April 7, 2020	978-1-68405-650-7
Star Trek: Hell's Mirror		August 26, 2020	

==== Star Trek Omnibus (2009–2012) ====
Omnibus collections of back issues, including issues from past licensees.

Vol.	Collection	Date	ISBN
1	Marvel Comics	May 27, 2009	9781600105036
2	The Early Voyages	July 14, 2009	978-1-60010-496-1
3	The Original Series	August 11, 2010	9781600107122
4	Movie Omnibus	June 8, 2011	9781600105555
5	The Next Generation	December 25, 2012	9781613775370

==== Infestation (2011) ====
Infestation is a multi-franchise crossover series depicting a zombie invasion from the CVO: Covert Vampiric Operations universe of The Transformers, G.I. Joe, and Ghostbusters universes. Star Trek characters and settings appear in several issues.

Issue(s)	Date	Collection	Date	ISBN
Infestation, Issue 1	January 2011	Infestation, Vol. 1	August 23, 2011	978-1-60010-977-5
Star Trek: Infestation, Part 1	February 2011	Infestation, Vol. 2	September 13, 2011	978-1-61377-003-0
Star Trek: Infestation, Part 2	February 2011	Infestation, Vol. 2	September 13, 2011	978-1-61377-003-0
Infestation, Issue 2	April 2011	Infestation, Vol. 2	September 13, 2011	978-1-61377-003-0

==== The Newspaper Comics (2012–13) ====
Star Trek: The Newspaper Comics collects the Los Angeles Times Syndicate strips.

Collection	Date	ISBN
The Newspaper Comics, Vol. 1	December 25, 2012	978-1-61377-494-6
The Newspaper Comics, Vol. 2	October 1, 2013	978-1-61377-776-3

==== Classic UK Comics (2016–17) ====
Star Trek: The Classic UK Comics collects the two-page issues originally published in UK comics magazines Joe 90: Top Secret and TV21 from 1967 to 1969.

Vol.	Date	ISBN
1	April 26, 2016	978-1-63140-512-9
2	January 3, 2017	978-1-63140-776-5
3	September 19, 2017	978-1-63140-967-7

==== The Mirror Universe Saga ====
A reprint collection of a 1980s DC Comics story arc which picks up after Star Trek III: The Search for Spock. Admiral Kirk and the crew of the U.S.S. Enterprise clash with their evil doppelgangers from the Mirror Universe.

No.	Issue(s)	Date	Collection	Date	ISBN
9	"New Frontiers Chapter 1: ...Promises to Keep"	December 1984	Star Trek Classics: The Mirror Universe Saga	March 15, 2022	9781684058730
10	"New Frontiers Chapter 2: Double Image"	January 1985	Star Trek Classics: The Mirror Universe Saga	March 15, 2022	9781684058730
11	"New Frontiers Chapter 3: Deadly Reflection!"	February 1985	Star Trek Classics: The Mirror Universe Saga	March 15, 2022	9781684058730
12	"New Frontiers Chapter 4: The Tantalus Trap!"	March 1985	Star Trek Classics: The Mirror Universe Saga	March 15, 2022	9781684058730
13	"New Frontiers Chapter 5: Masquerade!"	April 1985	Star Trek Classics: The Mirror Universe Saga	March 15, 2022	9781684058730
14	"New Frontiers Chapter 6: Behind Enemy Lines!"	May 1985	Star Trek Classics: The Mirror Universe Saga	March 15, 2022	9781684058730
15	"New Frontiers Chapter 7: The Beginning of the End..."	June 1985	Star Trek Classics: The Mirror Universe Saga	March 15, 2022	9781684058730
