= Stabenfeldt International =

Stabenfeldt International is a Norwegian children’s publishing company that operates three direct-mail book sales clubs targeting young adults and kids. The clubs include TL, a teen girls club, BOING, a boys soccer club, and PONY, a club about horses and ponies for kids and teens. Stabenfeldt's clubs currently maintain a presence in Europe. PONY was the only club to run in the USA. Stabenfeldt publishes authors such as Joanna Campbell, Jenny Hughes, the late Sharon Siamon, and Angela Dorsey.

== History ==
In 1913, Nils Stabenfeldt established a small printing house in Norway for sardine can labels. In order to fill the free capacity of the printing machines, Nils Stabenfeldt began printing and publishing books around 1920. At first, only local literature was published, but by the end of World War II, Stabenfeldt had begun printing war literature and Bibles. The company then expanded into comics in 1953, and continued on to publish in total 74 different comic series titles throughout the next 47 years. However, the comic series market stagnated and declined in the 1970s, and the company once again remodeled itself. In 1982, Stabenfeldt discovered horses. Penny (Norwegian for Pony), a comic magazine based on girls and horses, was launched, and Pennyklubben (Norwegian for Pony Club) followed shortly after.

In 1984, the Stabenfeldt family sold the publishing house to Dreyer AS. Boing, and a comic magazine for boys interested in football (soccer, in the US), was born. The company again changed hands in 1987, this time to Bongskonsernet, who established TL Klubben, a book club for preteen and teen girls. The success of the three clubs took the business overseas. In 1995, the company was sold to Swedish entrepreneur Alf Tönnesson who also owns International Masters Publishers, known as IMP.

The Stabenfeldt motto: Creating Unique Moments for Kids

From 1995 to the current day, markets have been established in Sweden, Germany, Switzerland, Austria, Finland, Czech Republic, and Hungary. PONY was available in America until October 1, 2011 when due to membership rates going down PONY closed for good. Sharon Siamon died from Ovarian cancer on May 18, 2015.
