= Star track =

Star Track can refer to the following:

- StarTrack, an Australian delivery company
- Star Track (album), by Leo Ku
- "Star Track" (song), a song by Jefferson Airplane on the album Crown of Creation
- "Star Track", a parody of the "Star Trek" universe in Kevin Lyons' Takeoffs Equals Landings comic series.
- Star Tracks, a 1984 album featuring selected performances of film musical themes conducted by Erich Kunzel with the Cincinnati Pops Orchestra

== See also ==
- Star Trek
- Star Trak Entertainment, a record label also known as Star Trak
- Star tracker, an optical device
- Star trail, a photographic genre
