= Star Trek: Year Four =

2007 Star Trek comic book mini-series

Star Trek: Year Four is the first of two Star Trek comic book mini-series released by IDW Publishing. The first issue was released on July 26, 2007, with a cover price of $3.99. It featured three variant covers. The series picked up where the original television series left off and told stories set in the fourth year of the original five-year mission.

A follow-up mini-series was titled The Enterprise Experiment, and was written by D.C. Fontana and Derek Chester. Gordon Purcell handled the penciling chores. The series was a sequel to "The Enterprise Incident" and "Errand of Mercy".
