= Star Trek/X-Men =

1996 comic book crossover

- Cover of Star Trek/X-Men (1996). Art by Marc Silvestri (pencils) and Matt "Batt" Banning (inks).

Publication information
- Publisher: Marvel Comics (Paramount Comics imprint)
- Publication date: 1996
- No. of issues: 1
- Main character(s): James T. Kirk; Spock; Leonard McCoy; Wolverine; Cyclops; Jean Grey; Beast

Creative team
- Written by: Scott Lobdell
- Penciller(s): Marc Silvestri; Billy Tan; Anthony Winn; David Finch; Brian Ching (Background Assists)
- Inker(s): Matt "Batt" Banning; D-Tron; Billy Tan; Aaron Sowd; Joe Weems; Victor Llamas (assists); Team Tron (assists); Jose "Jag" Guillen (assists); Viet Troung (assists); Mike Manczarek (assists)
- Letterer: Dennis Heisler
- Colorist(s): Tyson Wngler; Steve Firchow; Jonathan D. Smith; Richard Isanove
- Editor: Bobbie Chase

Star Trek/X-Men is a one-shot comic book crossover, written by Scott Lobdell and published in 1996.

== Publication history ==
Published by Marvel Comics as part of its short-lived Paramount Comics imprint, the book chronicles the first encounter between Captain James T. Kirk and the crew of the Enterprise (during the five-year mission of the original series) and members of the X-Men, who traveled through a dimensional rift chasing the mutant Proteus. The artwork was produced by Marc Silvestri, as well as several other artists from his studio, Top Cow Productions. This was the first of the Star Trek comic books published by Marvel for the Paramount Comics line, and it contains previews for several of the follow-up series.

== Plot synopsis ==
Returning to the planet Delta Vega, site of the deaths of Lt. Cmdr. Gary Mitchell and Dr. Elizabeth Dehner, Captain Kirk and the crew of the Enterprise encounter a rift of psionic energy in space, through which travels a starship of Shi'ar design. The ship is quickly destroyed by the spatial anomaly, though not before Spock detects that it carried seven lifeforms of "near human" nature. A second, larger Shi'ar craft comes through the rift, which promptly fires an unusual projectile at the Enterprise: Gladiator of the Shi'ar Imperial Guard, who warns the Enterprise away from the planet and drives his point home by striking the ship's deflector shields, causing some actual damage to the vessel as a result. ("Did he just... punch my ship?" exclaims Kirk)

Meanwhile, the seven crew members of the destroyed ship are revealed to be members of the X-Men - Cyclops, Wolverine, Jean Grey, Beast, Storm, Gambit, and Bishop - who managed to transport to the Enterprise before their own vessel's destruction, though they are hiding to avoid detection. As Dr. McCoy discovers Beast and Storm sneaking Gambit into Sick Bay for medical attention, Spock has sensed the presences of the X-Men on board and confronts the remaining members, engaging Wolverine in combat and actually putting him under for a few moments with the Vulcan nerve pinch. The X-Men and the Enterprise crew soon settle their differences and meet to discuss the purpose of the mutants' trip to what they presume is an alternate universe: both they and the other Shi'ar ship, commanded by the renegade Deathbird, are tracking the consciousness of the powerful reality-altering mutant Proteus, who has traveled through the rift to Delta Vega and has reanimated the corpse of Lt. Mitchell, who had developed similar powers in the days leading up to his death.

Beaming down to the planet, the X-Men and the Enterprise command crew discover two things: first, that the surface had been transformed to resemble a Scottish village, and second, that Deathbird and the Imperial Guard beat them there, and offered Proteus/Mitchell the use of their ship in return for establishing an alliance. While Wolverine, Cyclops, Gambit, Storm, and members of the Enterprise crew fight off the Imperial Guard and Proteus' physical form, Jean Grey and Captain Kirk psionically appealed to the remaining consciousness of Mitchell and determine that the only way to win was to, once again, kill Mitchell's physical form. Beast, Spock, and Mr. Scott construct a way to direct the Enterprise's phaser energy through Bishop's energy channeling powers, and that, combined with the crew's own phasers and the powers of the X-Men succeeds in ending the Proteus/Mitchell entity's existence.

The battle over, the X-Men commandeer the Imperial Guard's starship and return home through the rift, expressing their happiness that after experiencing a multitude of alternate futures, they finally encountered one that seemed hopeful.

== Sequels ==
Members of the X-Men would meet the crew of Captain Picard's Enterprise in Star Trek: The Next Generation/X-Men #1 and the novel Planet X.
