= Star Trek vs. Transformers =

Comic book limited series

Publication information
- Publisher: IDW Publishing
- Format: Limited series
- Genre: Science fiction
- Publication date: September 2018 – January 2019
- No. of issues: 5

Creative team
- Written by: John Barber and Mike Johnson
- Artist: Philip Murphy
- Colorist: Priscilla Tramontano

Star Trek vs. Transformers is a five-issue comic book limited series published by IDW Publishing. It is a crossover between the Star Trek and Transformers franchises, using the characters and art styles from the 1973 cartoon Star Trek: The Animated Series and the 1984 cartoon The Transformers. The first issue was released in September 2018. The comic was issued as a five part mini-series and has met with favorable reviews for mixing the two science fiction universes. In particular, they praised artist Philip Murphy artistic style with character's which were compared to cel animation.

The comics are written by John Barber and Mike Johnson with art by Philip Murphy and Leonardo Ito as the colorist.

== Story ==
Answering a distress call, members of the USS Enterprise, including Captain Kirk and Spock, arrive at a dilithium mine on the planet Cygnus Seven, near the Klingon border. Unknown to them, a group of Autobots, led by Optimus Prime, crash-landed here following a battle with Decepticons. Following World War III on Earth, during the late 20th century the former group had left in search of energon. The miners reactivated both factions, the Decepticons first.

When they arrive, the starship crew find the Decepticons attacking. Following some misunderstandings and a mind-meld between Optimus Prime and Spock, Kirk learnes of the Autobots' situation and forms an alliance with them. The Decepticons, led by Megatron, have fled to a moon, where they encounter Trypticon in fortress mode, under control by Klingons led by one Commander Kuri.

During a fight, Fortress Tiberius, a transforming version of the Enterprise, mentally controlled by Kirk attacks to fight off a combined force of Klingons and Decepticons. (Kirk had learned to do this following a two-way neural scan with the Autobot called Ratchet.) The Klingon ship reveals itself as a transformed Trypticon. Kirk finds the transforming "Enterprise" hard to control, as it has a will of its own.

Starscream, now thinking of himself as "First Emperor Starscream", heads to the Klingon homeworld Kronos. The Autobot and Enterprise crew work out a more permanent alliance on board the real Enterprise. They've decided to pursue the Decepticons into Klingon space.

Meanwhile, Kirk wrestles with the moral dilemma of not abandoning the Autobots, yet also not endangering his own crew. Optimus Prime empathizes with the Starfleet captains. This gives Kirk an idea. TheEnterprise comes to rescue in the transformed Fortress Tiberius, the Autobots, and several replicated battle suits of Cybertronian armor piloted by Spock, Scotty, Sulu, and M'ress.

The Federation negotiates a truce with the Klingons, which absolves Kuri and his crew of any crimes. The Autobots assume independent control of their newly-renovated Titan. Optimus Prime pledges allegiance to the Federation. Fortress Tiberius embarks on an unspecified mission to the final frontier.

== Reception ==
The series has met with a positive response, and Philip Murphy's artistic direction was praised.

WhatCulture did not expect a good result from combining animated Star Trek and Transformers, yet they credited the IDW as making it work.

== See also ==
- List of Star Trek comics
