= Star Trek: Defiant =

Star Trek comic

- Star Trek: Defiant #1. From left to right: B'Elanna Torres, Worf, Spock and Lore

Publication information
- Publisher: IDW Publishing
- Format: Ongoing series
- Genre: see below
- Publication date: March 2023 – May 2025
- No. of issues: 27

Creative team
- Created by: Star Trek by Gene Roddenberry
- Written by: Chris Cantwell
- Artist: Ángel Unzueta
- Letterer: Clayton Cowles
- Colorist: Marissa Louise
- Editor: Heather Antos

Star Trek: Defiant is an ongoing comic book by IDW Publishing, based on characters from the Star Trek franchise. It is part of the Star Trek series of comics published by IDW. Issue #1 was published in March 2023.

== Publication history ==
The comic book is a spinoff comic of the Star Trek comic published at the same time, and part of a project by IDW Publishing to turn its Star Trek comics into a bigger shared universe. It is written by Chris Cantwell, who had been working for Marvel Comics at the Iron Man, Namor, and Star Wars: Obi-Wan comics. The artwork is by Ángel Unzueta, who also worked for Marvel in Iron Man and Star Wars: Poe Dameron.

Cantwell commented that, although the comic would be first and foremost a Star Trek work of fiction, it would not follow the space exploration theme frequent in most properties of the franchise. He said "Whereas the new 'Star Trek' book carries forward the grand tradition of Starfleet's saga of discovery and exploration, 'Defiant' immediately sets out to break the rules of the Federation and go on a fugitive run from Starfleet with a cast of Trek's best iconoclastic heroes and ne'er-do-wells, each of them straddling worlds in their identities and calibrations in their moral compasses as they embark on a high-stakes galactic manhunt … the Prime Directive be damned".

in turn, when asked about the project Unzueta said: "It will be very exciting to show how far our crew can go to save the universe, how many rules they can break just to make things right, how badass these guys can be when compared to the more clean-cut crew of the Theseus from the ongoing series. Also, I'm working with a great writer, friend, and partner from our Iron Man days, and with my favorite editor, who is pushing me to the stars once again. I am so excited and ready to make this book a new experience for the Trek audience!".

Cantwell chose Worf and Spock as the main characters for the contrast between their species' usual characterization: Klingons such as Worf are highly emotional and easily fall into fits of rage, and Vulcans like Spock focus on logic and repress their emotions. However, he also placed limits on it: he depicted Worf as being aware of his tendency to rushed action, and Spock as someone who can twist logic at his convenience. He also wanted to explore both of their reactions and reservations towards the role of captain.

Although B'Elanna Torres and Ro Laren are both former members of the terrorist Maquis, they are shown as being openly hostile to each other. Cantwell explained that their different backstories in relation to the organization were in contrast and added to the drama of the comic. Torres was a member of the Maquis for a brief time before being stranded in the Delta Quadrant (for the duration of the Star Trek: Voyager series) and when she returned the organization had collapsed. Ro Laren joined the Maquis as a spy for the Federation and then joined them for real. Cantwell reasoned that Laren would resent Torres for her absence, and that not knowing her firsthand Torres would distrust Laren for being a spy at first.

The TV live-action series Star Trek: Picard had been released shortly before the comic, and featured the characters of Worf, Ro Laren and Lore as well. Although the TV series is set in the future in relation to the comic, Cantwell still tried to make those characters consistent with their characterizations in it.

== Plot ==
Worf, a member of the crew of the USS Theseus, left it in disagreement with captain Benjamin Sisko on the way to deal with the threat of the Klingon emperor Kahless, who started a killing spree. He stole the USS Defiant and got others to join him: ambassador Spock, former Maquis members B'Elanna Torres and Ro Laren, and the android Lore. In a later mission against Orion pirates, Sela joins them. Both ships join forces and finally defeat Kahless. After that, Worf asks Starfleet for amnesty, which is denied. Starfleet instead hires them as secret agents for off-the-book operations.

== Issues/Collections ==
No.	Issue(s)	Date	Collection	Date	ISBN
1	Defiant, Issue 1	March 8, 2023	Star Trek: Defiant, Volume 1	November 14, 2023	9798887240282
2	Defiant, Issue 2	April 12, 2023	Star Trek: Defiant, Volume 1	November 14, 2023	9798887240282
3	Defiant, Issue 3	May 10, 2023	Star Trek: Defiant, Volume 1	November 14, 2023	9798887240282
4	Defiant, Issue 4	June 7, 2023	Star Trek: Defiant, Volume 1	November 14, 2023	9798887240282
5	Defiant, Issue 5	July 5, 2023	Star Trek: Defiant, Volume 1	November 14, 2023	9798887240282
6	Day of Blood, Part 2	August 2, 2023	Star Trek: Day of Blood	March 12, 2024	9798887240732
7	Day of Blood, Part 4	September 6, 2023	Star Trek: Day of Blood	March 12, 2024	9798887240732
8	Another Piece of the Action, Part 1	October 4, 2023	Star Trek: Defiant, Volume 2: Another Piece of the Action	June 18, 2024	9798887241227
9	Another Piece of the Action, Part 2	November 8, 2023	Star Trek: Defiant, Volume 2: Another Piece of the Action	June 18, 2024	9798887241227
10	Another Piece of the Action, Part 3	December 20, 2023	Star Trek: Defiant, Volume 2: Another Piece of the Action	June 18, 2024	9798887241227
0	Star Trek: Defiant: Annual	January 24, 2024	Star Trek: Defiant, Volume 2: Another Piece of the Action	June 18, 2024	9798887241227
11	Another Piece of the Action Part 4	February 7, 2024	Star Trek: Defiant, Volume 2: Another Piece of the Action	June 18, 2024	9798887241227
12	Hell Is Only a Word, Part 1	February 28, 2024	Star Trek: Defiant, Volume 3: Hell Is Only A Word	December 10, 2024	9798887241531
13	Hell Is Only a Word, Part 2	March 27, 2024	Star Trek: Defiant, Volume 3: Hell Is Only A Word	December 10, 2024	9798887241531
14	Hell Is Only a Word, Part 3	April 24, 2024	Star Trek: Defiant, Volume 3: Hell Is Only A Word	December 10, 2024	9798887241531
15	Hell Is Only a Word, Part 4	May 22, 2024	Star Trek: Defiant, Volume 3: Hell Is Only A Word	December 10, 2024	9798887241531
16	Hell Is Only a Word, Part 5	June 26, 2024	Star Trek: Defiant, Volume 3: Hell Is Only A Word	December 10, 2024	9798887241531
17	The Stars of Home, Part 1	July 24, 2024	Star Trek: Defiant, Volume 4: The Stars of Home	May 27, 2025	979-8887242712
18	The Stars of Home, Part 2	August 28, 2024	Star Trek: Defiant, Volume 4: The Stars of Home	May 27, 2025	979-8887242712
19	The Stars of Home, Part 3	September 25, 2024	Star Trek: Defiant, Volume 4: The Stars of Home	May 27, 2025	979-8887242712
20	The Stars of Home, Part 4	October 23, 2024	Star Trek: Defiant, Volume 4: The Stars of Home	May 27, 2025	979-8887242712
21	The Stars of Home, Part 5	November 27, 2024	Star Trek: Defiant, Volume 4: The Stars of Home	May 27, 2025	979-8887242712
22	No Old Warriors, Part 1	January 8, 2025	Star Trek: Defiant, Vol. 5: No Old Warriors	October 28, 2025	979-8887243580
23	No Old Warriors, Part 2	January 29, 2025	Star Trek: Defiant, Vol. 5: No Old Warriors	October 28, 2025	979-8887243580
24	No Old Warriors, Part 3	February 26, 2025	Star Trek: Defiant, Vol. 5: No Old Warriors	October 28, 2025	979-8887243580
25	No Old Warriors, Part 4	March 26, 2025	Star Trek: Defiant, Vol. 5: No Old Warriors	October 28, 2025	979-8887243580
26	Lore War, Part 2	April 16, 2025	Star Trek: Lore War	January 13, 2026	979-8887243597
27	Lore War, Part 4	May 21, 2025	Star Trek: Lore War	January 13, 2026	979-8887243597

== Reception ==
Hannah Rose from CBR praised both the idea of using Worf as the main character, as he has a different viewpoint and motivation than Sisko, and the presence of fan-favorite Spock and more obscure characters such as Ro Laren, B'Elanna Torres, and Lore. She criticized that the first issue was too dialogue-heavy and lacked enough action scenes. Hannah would later comment that the action truly started in issue #3, with action scenes in two simultaneous fronts. She points that all characters speak in a formal manner, even the roguish Ro Laren and the evil android Lore, and considered that Cantwell managed to balance such tone with the needs of the action scenes and the previous characterizations in the live-action series. She also praised the arts, considering that they do not feel crowded and are easy to read.
