= Star Trek: Early Voyages =

Publication information
- Publisher: Marvel Comics
- Schedule: Monthly
- Format: Ongoing series
- Genre: Science fiction
- Publication date: February 1997 – June 1998
- No. of issues: 17
- Main character(s): Christopher Pike; Number One; Spock; Phillip Boyce

Creative team
- Created by: Gene Roddenberry
- Written by: Dan Abnett; Ian Edginton
- Penciller(s): Patrick Zircher; Mike Collins; Javier Pulido
- Inker(s): Greg Adams; Steve Moncuse
- Letterer: Janice Chiang
- Colorist: Marie Javins
- Editor(s): Bobbie Chase; Polly Watson

Collected editions
- Star Trek: Early Voyages: ISBN 1-60010-496-7

Star Trek: Early Voyages was a comic book series published by Marvel Comics in the United States, running for 17 issues from February 1997 until June 1998. This series was one of the most popular of Marvel's brief stint of Star Trek publishing; however, it was cancelled unceremoniously leaving the cliffhanger unresolved.

== Summary ==
Set ten years before Kirk's five-year mission, this prequel series showcases the adventures of the Enterprise under the command of Captain Christopher Pike.

The series relied heavily on the unaired pilot "The Cage". A mix of all new adventures and battles indicated in the episode eventually led to the incidents of the episode itself, this time featured through the focus of Yeoman Mia Colt. Colt featured in the series such as the time she traveled to the future to meet James T. Kirk. The rest of the series was filled out by all new adventures featuring other members of the crew. Not alone in the limelight, we also see character-centered stories for Nurse Carlotta and Nano, as well as the reasoning for Spock's emotional fit and later adherence to the Vulcan way.

Issues #16 and #17, "Thanatos" and "Nemesis," respectively, are two parts of an unfinished arc, wherein the crew is left in the middle of a conflict with an AI/WMD that is capable of destroying star ships. With the commanding officer incapacitated, the readers are left with a mystery as to how the story is resolved, as it was canceled before the creators could finish the arc.

== Main characters ==
- Captain Christopher Pike
- Lt. Commander Number One
- Lieutenant Spock
- Doctor Phillip Boyce
- Lieutenant Sita Mohindas
- Lieutenant José Tyler
- Ensign Nano
- Nurse Gabrielle Carlotti
- Yeoman Mia Colt
- Chief Garrison
- Chief Nils Pitcairn

== Creative team ==
- Based on Star Trek created by Gene Roddenberry
- Primary writers: Dan Abnett and Ian Edginton
- Primary pencil artist: Patrick Zircher (followed by Mike Collins, also Javier Pulido)
- Primary ink artist: Greg Adams (followed by Steve Moncuse)

== Issues ==
| Issue | Title | Writers | Pencils | Inks | Notes |
|---|---|---|---|---|---|
| #1 (2/97) | "Flesh of my Flesh" | Dan Abnett & Ian Edginton | Patrick Zircher | Greg Adams | A large living starship kidnaps Captain Pike and absorbs him, forcing him to relive memories until he is freed by his crew. He has flashbacks to many earlier missions dealing with his early days on Enterprise. |
| #2 (3/97) | "The Fires of Pharos" | Dan Abnett & Ian Edginton | Patrick Zircher | Greg Adams | |
| #3 (4/97) | "Our Dearest Blood" | Dan Abnett & Ian Edginton | Patrick Zircher | Greg Adams | Depicts the landing on Rigel VII mentioned in TOS:"The Cage" and the death of Yeoman Dermot Cusack. |
| #4 (5/97) | "Nor Iron Bars a Cage" | Dan Abnett & Ian Edginton | Patrick Zircher | Greg Adams | "The Cage," told through the eyes of Yeoman J. M. Colt. |
| #5 (6/97) | "Cloak and Dagger, Part I" | Dan Abnett & Ian Edginton | Patrick Zircher | Greg Adams | |
| #6 (7/97) | "Cloak and Dagger, Part II" | Dan Abnett & Ian Edginton | Patrick Zircher | Greg Adams | |
| #7 (8/97) | "The Flat, Gold Forever" | Dan Abnett & Ian Edginton | Patrick Zircher | Greg Adams | Captain Pike tries to protect a farming colony from murderous Klingons. |
| #8 (9/97) | "Immortal Wounds" | Dan Abnett & Ian Edginton | Patrick Zircher | Greg Adams | Doctor Boyce is accused of murder. |
| #9 (10/97) | "One of a Kind" | Dan Abnett & Ian Edginton | Michael Collins | Greg Adams | Nano's homeworld. |
| #10 (11/97) | "The Fallen, Part I" | Dan Abnett & Ian Edginton | Michael Collins | Greg Adams | |
| #11 (12/97) | "The Fallen, Part II" | Dan Abnett & Ian Edginton | Michael Collins | Greg Adams | |
| #12 (1/98) | "Futures, Part I" | Dan Abnett & Ian Edginton | Michael Collins | Greg Adams | Robert April |
| #13 (2/98) | "Futures, Part II: Future Tense" | Dan Abnett & Ian Edginton | Patrick Zircher | Steve Moncuse | Time travel to film era. TOS crew appearances. |
| #14 (3/98) | "Futures, Part III" | Dan Abnett & Ian Edginton | Patrick Zircher | Steve Moncuse | Time travel to film era. TOS crew appearances. |
| #15 (4/98) | "Now and Then" | Dan Abnett & Ian Edginton | Patrick Zircher | Steve Moncuse | Time travel to film era. TOS crew appearances. |
| #16 (5/98) | "Thanatos" | Dan Abnett & Ian Edginton | Javier Pulido | Steve Moncuse | |
| #17 (6/98) | "Nemesis" | Dan Abnett & Ian Edginton | Javier Pulido | Steve Moncuse | |

== Collected editions ==
- Star Trek: Early Voyages (collects Star Trek: Early Voyages #1–17, 436 pages, IDW Publishing, May 2009, ISBN 1-60010-496-7)

== See also ==
- Star Trek: Strange New Worlds, a Paramount Plus original series featuring Christopher Pike as a main character
