= Star Trek: Starfleet Academy (comics) =

Series by Marvel Comics, 1996 to 1998

Star Trek: Starfleet Academy was a comic book series published by Marvel Comics in the United States, running for 19 issues from December 1996 until June 1998. Along with Star Trek: Early Voyages, the two were the most popular of Marvel's brief stint of Star Trek publishing. The series ends with several plot points unresolved and a glimpse into the future.

== Summary ==
Following approximately six months behind the television continuity, the series follows the adventures of Omega Squad, a group of cadets formed at Starfleet Academy in San Francisco. The squad is formed by Commander Zund with the intention of training cadets to meet the new challenges of their time.

== Main characters ==
- Commander Kyethn Zund
- Cadet Nog
- Cadet Kamilah Goldstein
- Cadet Matthew Decker
- Cadet T'Priell
- Cadet Edam Astrun
- Cadet Pava Ek'noor Aqabaa

== Production crew ==
- Based on Star Trek created by Gene Roddenberry
- Primary writers: Christian Cooper
- Primary pencil artist: Chris Renaud (alternately John Royle)
- Primary ink artist: Andy Lanning (alternately Tom Wegrzyn)

== Issues ==
Issue	Publication date	Title	Writers	Pencils	Inks	Notes
#1	December 1996	"Prime Directives"	Chris Cooper	Chris Renaud	Andy Lanning	Omega Squad is formed. Nog's eagerness to fit in causes a series of simulated first contact holodeck scenarios to malfunction and put the squad at risk.
#2	January 1997	"Liberty"	Chris Cooper	Chris Renaud	Andy Lanning	The females enjoy some downtime in an Australian bar, while Nog gets in trouble by finding Matt's comic collection.
#3	February 1997	"Loyalty Test"	Chris Cooper	John Royle	Tom Wegrzyn	Matt joins the infamous Red Squad. (This coincides with a story arc in Star Trek: Deep Space Nine where Earth defenses are put to the test when Red Squad shut off major power generators.)
#4	March 1997	"War and Peace, Part I"	Chris Cooper	Chris Renaud	Andy Lanning	While tensions are high with the Klingon Empire, Omega Squad and First Cadre of the Klingon Military Academy are stranded on an uninhabited planet.
#5	April 1997	"War and Peace, Part II: Love and Death"	Chris Cooper	Chris Renaud	Andy Lanning	Both teams meet and agree to a fight between two champions, the result of which is the death of Kamilah. Matt also loses his left eye in the altercation.
#6	May 1997	"Passages"	Chris Cooper	Chris Renaud	Andy Lanning	Kamilah's interment, the introduction of Edam Astrun who, despite being a recluse proves he can put his skills to good use as he is recruited by Starfleet Academy for his talents as a powerful telepath.
#7	June 1997	"Hide & Seek"	Chris Cooper	Chris Renaud	Andy Lanning	Nog is accused of attempted murder on Edam. The squad finds the attempt was in fact the work of a Founder, whom they chase and apprehend. Held captive, the Founder commits suicide.
#8	July 1997	"X2"	Chris Cooper	John Royle	Andy Lanning	Omega Squad are held captive by Charlie X, a human child raised by aliens who gave him illusion powers, from an episode of Star Trek: The Original Series.
#9	August 1997	"Return to the Forbidden Planet, Part 1 of 2"	Chris Cooper	Chris Renaud	Andy Lanning	Omega Squad is led to Talos IV where they help Christopher Pike fight off the Jem'Hadar who have begun an invasion of Alpha Quadrant telepathic species.
#10	September 1997	"Return to the Forbidden Planet, Part 2"	Chris Cooper	Chris Renaud	Andy Lanning	Omega Squad emerges victorious in fighting off the Jem'Hadar by destroying their stockpile of ketracel white, with the help of Talosians and their illusions. Pike had also been an illusion created to give the cadets courage and focus. Returning to Starfleet Academy, the squad learns it is to stand trial for having been on Talos IV.
#11	October 1997	"Judgement"	Chris Cooper	John Royle	Tom Wegrzyn	Ambassador Spock offers to be legal counsel to Omega Squad and sways the judges by telling a story on how Jean-Luc Picard disobeyed the law to save the life of one of the judges. Omega Squad is nevertheless sentenced to death.
#12	November 1997	"Renegades"	Chris Cooper	Chris Renaud	Andy Lanning	Omega Squad escape their jail cell and head for Deep Space Nine to find someone who will listen to their plea, and that the Dominion intends to invade all telepath worlds in the Alpha Quadrant. (The story is the first of six instalments spanning most of the Star Trek titles Marvel ran at the time. This is known as the Telepathy War, which continued in issues 12 and 13 of Star Trek: Deep Space Nine, issue 6 of Star Trek: Unlimited, issue 13 of Star Trek: Voyager (the least significant portion of the arc), and finally the special issue Star Trek: Telepathy War #1.)
#13	December 1997	"Parent's Day"	Chris Cooper	John Royle	Tom Wegrzyn	It's parent's day at the Academy, and the cadets try to come to terms with their respective parents.
#14	January 1998	"T'Priell Revealed, Part 1: Betrayal"	Chris Cooper	Chris Renaud	Andy Lanning	A sinister side of T'Priell, who appears Romulan, takes over her and makes her kidnap the rest of the squad with Zund.
#15	February 1998	"T'Priell Revealed, Part 2: Origins"	Chris Cooper	Chris Renaud	Andy Lanning	The squad learns the truth about T'Priell. She died a few years prior, but not before having passed her katra to Selke, a Romulan she had befriended who looked remarkably like herself. With this, Selke was taken in by the Tal Shiar and brainwashed to believe she truly was T'Priell, so that she could infiltrate Starfleet Academy.
#16	March 1998	"T'Priell Revealed, Part 3: The Fall"	Chris Cooper	Chris Renaud	Andy Lanning	The squad escapes with T'Priell/Selke.
#17	April 1998	"Culture Clash"	Chris Cooper	John Royle	Tom Wegrzyn	Selke is taken to Vulcan to have T'Priell's katra removed, only to find that the minds are fused and must learn to cohabitate the same being.
#18	May 1998	"mangHom qaD" or "Cadet Challenge"	Chris Cooper	Chris Renaud	Andy Lanning	This issue is told from the point of view of First Cadre (see issues 4 and 5) as they try to find the Sword of Kahless, which is only a ruse made up by Omega Squad to bring First Cadre to justice for the death of Kamilah. (This issue was published both in English and Klingon which made it at the time the first Star Trek comic book to be presented in this manner).
#19	June 1998	"Between Love and Hate"	Chris Cooper	Chris Renaud	Andy Lanning	Pava faces her ex-lover, Kovold of First Cadre, only to learn that he and a teammate have been mutated by some unknown force. The series ends on a curious note, that this last story was told by Captain Edam Astrun several years in the future to one Fatimah, who could possibly be Kamilah's daughter.
