= Kahless =

Fictional Star Trek character

- Star Trek character
- Kahless the Unforgettable
- Portrayed by: Robert Herron and Kevin Conway

In-universe information
- Species: Klingon

Kahless "The Unforgettable" is a fictional character from the Star Trek media franchise. He was displayed as a portrait in Star Trek: The Original Series by Robert Herron and in Star Trek: The Next Generation by Kevin Conway; and is the titular character in the Star Trek novel Kahless by Michael Jan Freeman. Kahless is an important religious and historical figure to the Klingon race and has been studied in explorations of the philosophy within the setting of Star Trek.

Kahless was also the subject of a Klingon language opera in the Netherlands.

== Name ==
In the Klingon language, Kahless' name is spelled qeylIS and pronounced [qʰɛj.lɪʂ]. The Klingon spelling and pronunciation of Kahless' name was established in 1984 by language expert Marc Okrand.

== Background ==
Within the setting, Kahless is a messianic figure in Klingon history, who unified the Klingon people and became emperor after three centuries without leadership. Kahless said that Klingons should fight not just to shed blood, but to enrich the spirit. The story of Kahless is a cornerstone of Klingon mythology and religion.

The spouse of Kahless was Lady Lukara, whom he had become romantically involved with after a battle against five hundred warriors at the Great Hall of Qam-Chee, when the local garrison routed. Only Kahless and Lukara remained to fight and achieved a decisive victory.

An image of Kahless was encountered in the Star Trek episode "The Savage Curtain". In the Excalbian Yarnek's study of good versus evil, Kahless was one of the evil images alongside Zora, Colonel Phillip Green and Genghis Khan. Abraham Lincoln and Surak of Vulcan represented good and assisted Kirk and Spock. Played by actor Robert Herron, this Kahless also appeared as the typical original series smooth forehead Klingon (which does not date back to the era of Kahless as revealed in Star Trek: Enterprise). As the Excalbians were reading Kirk and Spock's thought patterns, Kahless's depiction here was believed by fans to be based solely on Kirk's limited and heavily biased knowledge of Klingon culture.

In the Next Generation episode "Rightful Heir," Kahless was alluded to as having united the Klingon Empire some 1,500 years ago after fighting and killing the tyrant Molor with the first bat'leth. He is said to have fashioned the weapon by dropping a lock of his hair into the lava from the Kri'stak Volcano and twisting it into a blade.

Furthermore, in the episode, a clone of Kahless was created by caretakers of the planet Boreth (a Klingon pilgrimage site) using dried blood from the ancient dagger of Molor in an attempt to gain political influence. The scheme was circumvented by Worf, who learned the truth and subsequently arranged for the new Kahless II to occupy a ceremonial position as a figurehead and spiritual leader in the Klingon Empire.

Another story tells of how Kahless fought his brother, Morath, for twelve days and twelve nights after Morath had lied and brought shame to his family. Kahless is also said to have fought off an entire army single-handedly at Three Turn Bridge.

== Religion ==
In-universe, Klingon warriors will often pray to Kahless for guidance before going into battle. The Blood Oath, a popular Klingon prayer, most prominently used in Star Trek: Discovery is as follows:

- "Whom do we seek?"
  - "Kahless."
- "How do we find him?"
  - "Together."
- "Give us light to see."
  - "Forever."
- "Will he hide from us always?"
  - "Never."

In Star Trek and Philosophy: The Wrath of Kant, they are comfortable with Worf's exploration of his spirituality on his trip to Boreth. They note that when Kahless appears not as a vision, but an actual person to Worf, he reacts with skepticism, and responds by using the advanced technology at his disposal to investigate.

== Clone ==
In the Star Trek science fiction universe, the Clone of Kahless was created by a Klingon scientist named Gothmara, with the assistance and aid of materials provided by the Clerics, "The r'tak of Boreth."

By Lieutenant Worf's design and with the cooperation of Chancellor Gowron, the Clone of Kahless becomes emperor of the Klingon Empire in the Star Trek: The Next Generation episode "Rightful Heir." The emperor is a figurehead, with power residing with the Klingon High Council. Worf believes this to be the first step in a renaissance for the Klingon people. This idealism is seen to be unfounded when the Clone's opposition to the Klingon invasion of Cardassian space is unheeded by the High Council and their armies.

The Kahless clone is played by actor Kevin Conway in the episode "Rightful Heir."

The clone was made from cells that existed from the original Kahless, but he is not made aware of the cloning process and instead tricked into thinking he is the original Kahless. In addition to being cloned, the monks used stories to imprint on his mind, thus altering his natural mind.

According to Star Trek writer Ronald D. Moore, the inspiration for the idea of bringing Kahless back was the popularity in the early 1990s of cloning with DNA, such as popularized in Jurassic Park. Then there was the idea of doing this with a person, in this case Kahless of the Klingons empire was chosen, and the concept developed from there. Previous episodes and book had established a kind of Klingon religion in the Star Trek lore, and the writing for Kahless was influenced by that.

== Novels and opera ==
The non-canon novel Kahless, written by Michael Jan Friedman, gives a different version of Kahless' history. In the novel, Kahless left for Sto-vo-kor with a scroll detailing how he really brought about the creation of the new Klingon Empire. The scroll says that Kahless was a loyal soldier of Molor who killed the son of the tyrant because he was acting in a dishonorable manner. Kahless fled with his company of soldiers and was then thought of as a sort of hero to the people. However, he did not think of himself a hero. It was Morath, who was not blood-related but was still considered a brother under Klingon custom, who forced Kahless to stick with his rebellion and slay the tyrant. While Molor was indeed a strong and capable warrior, when Kahless and Morath finally met him in battle, he was severely weakened by the plague happening at the time. Kahless gave Molor his d'k tahg to commit suicide. Instead, Molor threw it at Kahless, but Morath jumped in front of the blade, after which Kahless decapitated the tyrant. Thus, the blade contains the blood of Morath who sacrificed his life for his friend, not the blood of Kahless. Moreover, the book makes clear that the supposed clone of Kahless is a clone of Morath. The novel also describes the creation of the first bat'leth. Kahless had a vision of his dead mate in Sto-vo-kor telling him to do exactly what the myth says (make the sword from his hair and lava). Instead, he draws the image of the sword and gives it to a swordsmith. Despite the scroll being proven authentic, most Klingons still see their Emperor as a semi-divine figure.

Kahless is referred-to in the 1984 tie-in novel The Final Reflection by John M. Ford. Captain Krenn tells the story to Dr Tagore, of how the Klingons have one who is not forgotten. When his ship was dying, Kahless had his hand bound to the captain's chair, so none could say he left the bridge. The ship's crew could then abandon the ship, because Kahless had taken on the ship's fate. Krenn tells Tagore that's the source of the Klingon phrase Kahlesste kaase, Kahless' hand, a swear or curse that many of the Klingons in the book utter when impressed or awed.

Kahless is the subject of an opera in the Klingon language: ’u’, which debuted at The Hague in September 2010. The opera was presented in the Klingon language.

== See also ==
- Star Trek: Day of Blood
