= Eisner Award for Best Lettering =

American comic book award

- Awarded for: Best Lettering for Comic Books
- Country: United States
- First award: 1993
- Most recent winner: Hassan Otsmane-Elhaou
- Website: www.comic-con.org/awards/eisner-awards/

The Eisner Award for Best Lettering is an award for "creative achievement" in American comic books. It is awarded to a letterer.

== Winners and nominees ==
| Year | Nominee | Titles | Ref. |
|---|---|---|---|
| 1993 | Todd Klein | The Sandman (DC Comics), The Demon (DC Comics) | |
| 1993 | Tom Orzechowski | Spawn (Image Comics) | |
| 1993 | Stan Sakai | Groo the Wanderer (Marvel Comics/Epic Comics), Usagi Yojimbo (Fantagraphics Books) | |
| 1993 | Dave Sim | Cerebus (Aardvark-Vanaheim) | |
| 1993 | John Workman | The Legion of Superheroes (DC Comics), RoboCop Versus The Terminator (Dark Horse Comics) | |
| 1994 | Todd Klein | The Shadow (Dark Horse Comics), The Sandman (DC Comics/Vertigo Comics), The Demon (DC Comics), Jonah Hex: Two-Gun Mojo (DC Comics/Vertigo Comics), Batman/Dark Joker: The Wild (DC Comics), Hellblazer (DC Comics/Vertigo Comics) | |
| 1994 | Ken Bruzenak | Batman/Grendel (Comico/DC Comics), Batman/Houdini: The Devil's Workshop (DC Comics) | |
| 1994 | Bob Lappan | Understanding Comics (Kitchen Sink Press) | |
| 1994 | Dave Sim | Cerebus (Aardvark-Vanaheim) | |
| 1995 | Todd Klein | Batman Versus Predator II (DC Comics/Dark Horse Comics), The Demon (DC Comics), The Sandman (DC Comics/Vertigo Comics), Uncle Scrooge (Gladstone Publishing) | |
| 1995 | Stan Sakai | Groo the Wanderer/Groo (Epic Comics/Image Comics), Usagi Yojimbo (Mirage Studios) | |
| 1995 | Dave Sim | Cerebus (Aardvark-Vanaheim) | |
| 1995 | Chris Ware | The Acme Novelty Library (Fantagraphics Books) | |
| 1996 | Stan Sakai | Groo (Image Comics), Usagi Yojimbo (Mirage Studios) | |
| 1996 | Dan Clowes | Eightball (Fantagraphics Books) | |
| 1996 | Richard Sala | "The Chuckling Whatsit" in Zero Zero (Fantagraphics Books) | |
| 1996 | Bill Splicer | The Big Guy and Rusty the Boy Robot (Dark Horse Comics/Legend) | |
| 1996 | Bill Yoshida | various Archie titles (Archie Comics) | |
| 1997 | Todd Klein | The Sandman (DC Comics/Vertigo Comics), Death: The Time of Your Life (DC Comics/Vertigo Comics), House of Secrets (DC Comics/Vertigo Comics), The Dreaming (DC Comics/Vertigo Comics), Batman (DC Comics), The Spectre (DC Comics), Kingdom Come (DC Comics) | |
| 1997 | Stan Sakai | Usagi Yojimbo (Dark Horse Comics), Space Usagi (Dark Horse Comics) | |
| 1997 | Dave Sim | Cerebus (Aardvark-Vanaheim) | |
| 1997 | Richard Starkings and Comicraft | Batman: The Long Halloween (DC Comics), Generation X (Marvel Comics) | |
| 1997 | Chris Ware | Acme Novelty Library (Fantagraphics Books) | |
| 1998 | Todd Klein | Batman (DC Comics), Batman: Poison Ivy (DC Comics), The Dreaming (DC Comics/Vertigo Comics), House of Secrets (DC Comics/Vertigo Comics), The Invisibles (DC Comics/Vertigo Comics), Uncle Sam (DC Comics/Vertigo Comics), Uncle Scrooge Adventures (Gladstone Publishing); Castle Waiting (Olio Press) | |
| 1998 | Dan Clowes | Eightball (Fantagraphics Books) | |
| 1998 | Tim Harkins | Roswell, Little Green Man (Bongo Comics), Adventures in the DC Universe (DC Comics) | |
| 1998 | Archer Prewitt | Sof' Boy and Friends (Drawn & Quarterly) | |
| 1998 | Chris Ware | Acme Novelty Library (Fantagraphics Books) | |
| 1999 | Todd Klein | Castle Waiting (Olio Press), House of Secrets (DC Comics/Vertigo Comics), The Invisibles (DC Comics/Vertigo Comics), The Dreaming (DC Comics/Vertigo Comics), etc. | |
| 1999 | Sean Konot | Grendel: Black, White, and Red (Dark Horse Comics), Star Wars: Crimson Empire (Dark Horse Comics), Nobody (Oni Press) | |
| 1999 | Stan Sakai | Usagi Yojimbo (Dark Horse Comics), Sergio Aragones' Groo (Dark Horse Comics), Sergio Aragones' Boogeyman, (Dark Horse Comics), Sergio Aragones' Dia de los Muertos (Dark Horse Comics) | |
| 1999 | Chris Ware | Acme Novelty Library (Fantagraphics Books) | |
| 1999 | Bill Yoshida | Archie (Archie Comics), Betty (Archie Comics), Veronica (Archie Comics), Jughead (Archie Comics), etc. (Archie Comics) | |
2000s
| 2000 | Todd Klein | Promethea (America's Best Comics), Tom Strong (America's Best Comics), Tomorrow Stories (America's Best Comics), Top 10 (America's Best Comics), The Dreaming (DC Comics/Vertigo Comics), Gifts of the Night (DC Comics/Vertigo Comics), The Invisibles (DC Comics/Vertigo Comics), Sandman Presents: Lucifer (DC Comics/Vertigo Comics) | |
| 2000 | Dan Clowes | Eightball (Fantagraphics Books) | |
| 2000 | John Roshell | Kurt Busiek's Astro City (DC Comics/WildStorm/Homage Comics) | |
| 2000 | Stan Sakai | Usagi Yojimbo (Dark Horse Comics/Maverick), Sergio Aragones' Groo and Rufferto (Dark Horse Comics/Maverick) | |
| 2000 | Richard Starkings/Comicraft | Avengers (Marvel Comics), Avengers Forever (Marvel Comics), Avengers #1 1/2 (Marvel Comics), Daredevil (Marvel Comics), Inhumans (Marvel Comics), Witching Hour (DC Comics/Vertigo Comics) | |
| 2001 | Todd Klein | Promethea (America's Best Comics), Tom Strong (America's Best Comics), Tomorrow Stories (America's Best Comics), Top 10 (America's Best Comics), The Invisibles (Vertigo Comics/DC Comics), The Dreaming (Vertigo Comics/DC Comics), Castle Waiting (Cartoon Books) | |
| 2001 | Galen Showman | The Ring of the Nibelung (Dark Horse Comics/Maverick) | |
| 2001 | Dave Sim | Cerebus (Aardvark-Vanaheim) | |
| 2001 | Chris Ware | Acme Novelty Library (Fantagraphics Books) | |
| 2002 | Todd Klein | Promethea (America's Best Comics), Tom Strong's Terrific Tales (America's Best Comics), Tomorrow Stories (America's Best Comics), Top 10 (America's Best Comics), Greyshirt (America's Best Comics), The Sandman Presents: Everything You Always Wanted to Know About Dreams But Were Afraid to Ask (DC Comics/Vertigo Comics), Detective Comics (DC Comics), The Dark Knight Strikes Again (DC Comics), Castle Waiting (Olio Press), Universe X (Marvel Comics) | |
| 2002 | Dan Clowes | Eightball #22 (Fantagraphics Books) | |
| 2002 | Stan Sakai | Usagi Yojimbo (Dark Horse Comics/Maverick), Groo: Death & Taxes (Dark Horse Comics/Maverick) | |
| 2002 | Dave Sim | Cerebus (Aardvark-Vanaheim) | |
| 2002 | Chris Ware | Acme Novelty Library #15 (Fantagraphics Books) | |
| 2003 | Todd Klein | The Dark Knight Strikes Again (DC Comics), Detective Comics (DC Comics), Wonder Woman: The Hiketeia (DC Comics), Fables (DC Comics/Vertigo Comics), Human Target: Final Cut (DC Comics/Vertigo Comics), Promethea (America's Best Comics), Tom Strong (America's Best Comics), Castle Waiting (Olio Press) | |
| 2003 | Richard Starkings/Comicraft | Action Comics (DC Comics), Adventures of Superman (DC Comics), Batman (DC Comics), Legion (DC Comics), Power Company (DC Comics), Supergirl (DC Comics), Superman (DC Comics), Wonder Woman (DC Comics), The Crusades (DC Comics/Vertigo Comics), Hunter: The Age of Magic (DC Comics/Vertigo Comics), Lucifer (DC Comics/Vertigo Comics), Vertigo Pop: Tokyo (DC Comics/Vertigo Comics), Wildcats Version 3.0 (WildStorm), Decoy (Penny-Farthing Press), The Victorian (Penny-Farthing Press), Hip Flask: Unnatural Selection (Comicraft) | |
| 2003 | John Workman | Batman Family (DC Comics), Detective Comics (DC Comics), Orion (DC Comics), Superman: Day of Doom (DC Comics), 100% (DC Comics/Vertigo Comics) | |
| 2004 | Todd Klein | Detective Comics (DC Comics), Fables (Vertigo Comics/DC Comics), The Sandman: Endless Nights (Vertigo Comics/DC Comics), Tom Strong (America's Best Comics), Promethea (America's Best Comics), 1602 (Marvel Comics) | |
| 2004 | Bill Oakley | Hawkman (DC Comics), JSA (DC Comics), The League of Extraordinary Gentlemen, Volume II (America's Best Comics), Sleeper (WildStorm/DC Comics) | |
| 2004 | Dave Sim | Cerebus (Aardvark-Vanaheim) | |
| 2004 | Richard Starkings | Batman (DC Comics), Planetary (WildStorm/DC Comics), Hulk: Gray (Marvel Comics), Hip Flask: Elephantmen (Comicraft) | |
| 2005 | Todd Klein | Promethea (America's Best Comics), Tom Strong (America's Best Comics), Tom Strong's Terrific Tales (America's Best Comics), Wonder Woman (DC Comics), Books of Magick: Life During Wartime (Vertigo Comics/DC Comics), Fables (Vertigo Comics/DC Comics), We3 (Vertigo Comics/DC Comics), Creatures of the Night (Dark Horse Comics) | |
| 2005 | Stan Sakai | Usagi Yojimbo (Dark Horse Comics) | |
| 2005 | Dave Sim | Cerebus (Aardvark-Vanaheim) | |
| 2005 | Craig Thompson | Carnet de Voyage (Top Shelf Productions), "Eve O' Twins" in Rosetta 2 (Alternative Comics) | |
| 2006 | Todd Klein | Wonder Woman (DC Comics), Justice (DC Comics, Seven Soldiers #0 (DC Comics), Desolation Jones (WildStorm/DC Comics), Promethea (America's Best Comics), Top 10: The Forty-Niners (America's Best Comics), Tomorrow Stories Special #1 (America's Best Comics), Fables (Vertigo Comics/DC Comics), 1602: New World (Marvel Comics) | |
| 2006 | Chris Eliopoulos | Ultimate Iron Man (Marvel Comics), Astonishing X-Men (Marvel Comics), The Ultimates 2 (Marvel Comics), House of M (Marvel Comics), Franklin Richards (Marvel Comics), Fell (Image Comics) | |
| 2006 | Richard Starkings | Conan (Dark Horse Comics), Revelations (Dark Horse Comics), Gødland (Image Comics), Gunpowder Girl and the Outlaw Squaw (Active Images), Hip Flask: Mystery City (Active Images) | |
| 2006 | Chris Ware | Acme Novelty Library #16 (The ACME Novelty Library) | |
| 2007 | Todd Klein | Fables (Vertigo Comics/DC Comics), Jack of Fables (Vertigo Comics/DC Comics), Fables: 1001 Nights of Snowfall (Vertigo Comics/DC Comics), Pride of Baghdad (Vertigo Comics/DC Comics), Testament (Vertigo Comics/DC Comics), 1602: Fantastick Four (Marvel Comics), Eternals (Marvel Comics), Lost Girls (Top Shelf Productions) | |
| 2007 | Ivan Brunetti | Schizo (Fantagraphics Books) | |
| 2007 | Clem Robins | BPRD (Dark Horse Comics), The Dark Horse Book of Monsters (Dark Horse Comics), Hellboy (Dark Horse Comics), Loveless (Vertigo Comics/DC Comics), 100 Bullets (Vertigo Comics/DC Comics), Y: The Last Man (Vertigo Comics/DC Comics) | |
| 2007 | Richard Sala | The Grave Robber's Daughter (Fantagraphics Books), Delphine (Fantagraphics Books) | |
| 2007 | Chris Ware | Acme Novelty Library #17 (Acme Novelty Library) | |
| 2008 | Todd Klein | Justice (DC Comics), Simon Dark (DC Comics), Fables (Vertigo Comics/DC Comics), Jack of Fables (Vertigo Comics/DC Comics), Crossing Midnight (Vertigo Comics/DC Comics), The League of Extraordinary Gentlemen: Black Dossier (WildStorm/DC Comics), Nexus (Rude Dude Productions) | |
| 2008 | Jared K. Fletcher | Catwoman (DC Comics), The Spirit (DC Comics), Sentences: The Life of MF Grimm (Vertigo Comics/DC Comics) | |
| 2008 | Jimmy Gownley | Amelia Rules! (Renaissance Press) | |
| 2008 | Lewis Trondheim | At Loose Ends (Fantagraphics Books), Mome #7 & 8 (Fantagraphics Books) | |
| 2008 | Chris Ware | Acme Novelty Library #18 (Acme Novelty Library) | |
| 2009 | Chris Ware | Acme Novelty Library #18 (Acme Novelty Library) | |
| 2009 | Farel Dalrymple | Omega: The Unknown (Marvel Comics) | |
| 2009 | Jimmy Gownley | Amelia Rules! (Renaissance Press) | |
| 2009 | Scott Morse | Tiger!Tiger!Tiger! (Red Window) | |
| 2009 | Nate Powell | Swallow Me Whole (Top Shelf Productions) | |
2010s
| 2010 | David Mazzucchelli | Asterios Polyp (Pantheon Books) | |
| 2010 | Brian Fies | Whatever Happened to the World of Tomorrow? (Abrams ComicArts) | |
| 2010 | Tom Orzechowski | Savage Dragon (Image Comics), X-Men Forever (Marvel Comics) | |
| 2010 | Richard Sala | Cat Burgler Black (First Second Books), Delphine (Fantagraphics Books) | |
| 2010 | Adrian Tomine | A Drifting Life (Drawn & Quarterly) | |
| 2011 | Todd Klein | Fables (Vertigo Comics/DC Comics), The Unwritten (Vertigo Comics/DC Comics), Joe the Barbarian (Vertigo Comics/DC Comics), iZOMBIE (Vertigo Comics/DC Comics), Tom Strong and the Robots of Doom (WildStorm/DC Comics), SHIELD (Marvel Comics), Driver for the Dead (Radical Publishing) | |
| 2011 | Darwyn Cooke | Richard Stark's Parker: The Outfit (IDW Publishing) | |
| 2011 | Dan Clowes | Wilson (Drawn & Quarterly) | |
| 2011 | Jimmy Gownley | Amelia Rules!: True Things (Adults Don’t Want Kids to Know) (Atheneum Books/Simon & Schuster), Amelia Rules!: The Tweenage Guide to Not Being Unpopular (Atheneum Books/Simon & Schuster) | |
| 2011 | Doug TenNapel | Ghostopolis (Scholastic Graphix) | |
| 2011 | Chris Ware | Acme Novelty Library #20: Lint (Drawn & Quarterly) | |
| 2012 | Stan Sakai | Usagi Yojimbo (Dark Horse Comics) | |
| 2012 | Deron Bennett | Billy Fog (Archaia Entertainment), Jim Henson's Dark Crystal (Archaia Entertainment), Jim Henson's Tale of Sand (Archaia Entertainment), Mr. Murder Is Dead (Archaia Entertainment), Helldorado (Ape Entertainment), Puss in Boots (Ape Entertainment), Richie Rich (Ape Entertainment) | |
| 2012 | Jimmy Gownley | Amelia Rules!: The Meaning of Life ... And Other Stuff (Atheneum Books) | |
| 2012 | Laura Lee Gulledge | Page by Paige (Amulet Books) | |
| 2012 | Tom Orzechowski | The Manara Library (with L. Lois Buhalis) (Dark Horse Comics), Mangaman (Houghton Mifflin Harcourt), Savage Dragon (Image Comics) | |
| 2013 | Chris Ware | Building Stories (Pantheon Books) | |
| 2013 | Paul Grist | Mudman (Image Comics) | |
| 2013 | Troy Little | Angora Napkin 2: Harvest of Revenge (IDW Publishing) | |
| 2013 | Joseph Remnant | Harvey Pekar's Cleveland (ZIP Comics/Top Shelf Productions) | |
| 2013 | C. Tyler | You'll Never Know, Book 3: A Soldier's Heart (Fantagraphics Books) | |
| 2014 | Darwyn Cooke | Richard Stark's Parker: Slayground (IDW Publishing) | |
| 2014 | Carla Speed McNeil | Bad Houses (Dark Horse Comics), "Finder" in Dark Horse Presents (Dark Horse Comics) | |
| 2014 | Terry Moore | Rachel Rising (Abstract Studio) | |
| 2014 | Ed Piskor | Hip Hop Family Tree (Fantagraphics Books) | |
| 2014 | Britt Wilson | Adventure Time with Fionna and Cake (kaBOOM!) | |
| 2015 | Stan Sakai | Usagi Yojimbo: Senso (Dark Horse Comics), Usagi Yojimbo Color Special: The Artist (Dark Horse Comics) | |
| 2015 | Joe Caramagna | Ms. Marvel (Marvel Comics), Daredevil (Marvel Comics) | |
| 2015 | Todd Klein | Fables (Vertigo Comics/DC Comics), The Sandman: Overture (Vertigo Comics/DC Comics), The Unwritten (Vertigo Comics/DC Comics), Nemo: The Roses of Berlin (Top Shelf Productions) | |
| 2015 | Max | Vapor (Fantagraphics Books) | |
| 2015 | Jack Morelli | Afterlife with Archie (Archie Comics), Archie (Archie Comics), Betty and Veronica (Archie Comics), etc. (Archie Comics) | |
| 2016 | Derf Backderf | Trashed (Abrams Books) | |
| 2016 | Steve Dutro | Blood-C (Dark Horse Comics), Midnight Society (Dark Horse Comics), Plants vs. Zombies (Dark Horse Comics) | |
| 2016 | Lucy Knisley | Displacement (Fantagraphics Books) | |
| 2016 | Troy Little | Hunter S. Thompson's Fear and Loathing in Las Vegas (Top Shelf Productions/IDW Publishing) | |
| 2016 | Kevin McCloskey | We Dig Worms! (Toon Books) | |
| 2017 | Todd Klein | Clean Room (Vertigo Comics/DC Comics), Dark Night: A True Batman Story (Vertigo Comics/DC Comics), Lucifer (Vertigo Comics/DC Comics), Black Hammer (Dark Horse Comics) | |
| 2017 | Dan Clowes | Patience (Fantagraphics Books) | |
| 2017 | Brecht Evens | Panther (Drawn & Quarterly) | |
| 2017 | Tom Gauld | Mooncop (Drawn & Quarterly) | |
| 2017 | Sonny Liew | The Art of Charlie Chan Hock Chye (Pantheon Books) | |
| 2018 | Stan Sakai | Usagi Yojimbo (Dark Horse Comics), Groo: Play of the Gods (Dark Horse Comics) | |
| 2018 | Isabelle Arsenault | Louis Undercover (Groundwood Books/House of Anansi Press) | |
| 2018 | Clayton Cowles | Bitch Planet: Triple Feature (Image Comics), Redlands (Image Comics), The Wicked + The Divine (Image Comics), Black Bolt (Marvel Comics), Spider-Gwen (Marvel Comics), Astonishing X-Men (Marvel Comics), Star Wars (Marvel Comics) | |
| 2018 | Emil Ferris | My Favorite Thing Is Monsters (Fantagraphics Books) | |
| 2018 | John Workman | Mother Panic (DC's Young Animal), Ragnarok (IDW Publishing) | |
| 2019 | Todd Klein | Black Hammer: Age of Doom (Dark Horse Comics), Neil Gaiman’s A Study in Emerald (Dark Horse Comics), Batman: White Knight (DC Comics), Eternity Girl (DC's Young Animal), Books of Magic (Vertigo Comics/DC Comics), The League of Extraordinary Gentlemen: The Tempest (Top Shelf Productions/IDW Publishing) | |
| 2019 | David Aja | The Seeds (Berger Books/Dark Horse Comics) | |
| 2019 | Jim Campbell | Breathless (Black Mask Studios), Calexit (Black Mask Studios), Gravetrancers (Black Mask Studios), Snap Flash Hustle (Black Mask Studios), Survival Fetish (Black Mask Studios), The Wilds (Black Mask Studios), Abbott (Boom! Studios), Alice: From Dream to Dream (Boom! Studios), Black Badge (Boom! Studios), Clueless (Boom! Studios), Coda (Boom! Studios), Fence (Boom! Studios), Firefly (Boom! Studios), Giant Days (Boom! Studios), Grass Kings (Boom! Studios), Lumberjanes: The Infernal Compass (Boom! Studios), Low Road West (Boom! Studios), Sparrowhawk (Boom! Studios), Angelic (Image Comics), Wasted Space (Vault Comics) | |
| 2019 | Alex de Campi | Bad Girls (Gallery 13), Twisted Romance (Image Comics) | |
| 2019 | Jared K. Fletcher | Batman: Damned (DC Comics), The Gravediggers Union (Image Comics), Moonshine (Image Comics), Paper Girls (Image Comics), Southern Bastards (Image Comics) | |
2020s
| 2020 | Stan Sakai | Usagi Yojimbo (IDW Publishing) | |
| 2020 | Deron Bennett | Batgirl (DC Comics), Green Arrow (DC Comics), Justice League (DC Comics), Martian Manhunter (DC Comics), Canto (IDW Publishing), Assassin Nation (Skybound Entertainment/Image Comics), Excellence (Skybound Entertainment/Image Comics), To Drink and To Eat, vol. 1 (Lion Forge Comics), Resonant (Vault Comics) | |
| 2020 | Jim Campbell | Black Badge (Boom! Studios), Coda (Boom! Studios), Giant Days (Boom! Box), Lumberjanes: The Shape of Friendship (Boom! Box), Rocko’s Modern Afterlife (KaBOOM!), At the End of Your Tether (Lion Forge Comics), Blade Runner 2019 (Titan), The Mall (Scout Comics), The Plot (Vault Comics), Wasted Space (Vault Comics) | |
| 2020 | Clayton Cowles | Aquaman (DC Comics), Batman (DC Comics), Batman and the Outsiders (DC Comics), Heroes in Crisis (DC Comics), Superman: Up in the Sky (DC Comics), Superman's Pal Jimmy Olsen (DC Comics), Bitter Root (Image Comics), Pretty Deadly (Image Comics), Moonstruck (Image Comics), Redlands (Image Comics), The Wicked + The Divine (Image Comics), Reaver (Skybound Entertainment/Image Comics), Daredevil (Marvel Comics), Ghost-Spider (Marvel Comics), Silver Surfer Black (Marvel Comics), The Superior Spider-Man (Marvel Comics), Venom (Marvel Comics) | |
| 2020 | Emile Plateau | Colored: The Unsung Life of Claudette Colvin (Europe Comics) | |
| 2020 | Tillie Walden | Are You Listening? (First Second Books/Macmillan Publishers) | |
| 2021 | Stan Sakai | Usagi Yojimbo (IDW Publishing) | |
| 2021 | Mike Allred | Bowie: Stardust, Rayguns & Moonage Daydreams (Insight Editions) | |
| 2021 | Deron Bennett | Bear (Archaia Entertainment), The Sacrifice of Darkness (Archaia Entertainment); King of Nowhere (Boom! Studios), Something Is Killing the Children (Boom! Studios), We Only Find Them When They’re Dead (Boom! Studios); Far Sector (DC Comics), Harley Quinn: Black + White + Red (DC Comics), Martian Manhunter (DC Comics); Excellence (Image Comics/Skybound Entertainment); A Dark Interlude (Vault Comics), Dark One (Vault Comics), Relics of Youth (Vault Comics), Resonant (Vault Comics), Shadow Service (Vault Comics), Vampire: The Masquerade: Winter’s Teeth (Vault Comics); Ping Pong (Viz Media) | |
| 2021 | Aditya Bidikar | Barbalien: Red Planet (Dark Horse Comics), Grafity’s Wall Expanded Edition (Dark Horse Comics); John Constantine, Hellblazer (DC Comics); A Map to the Sun (First Second Books); The Department of Truth (Image Comics), Lost Soldiers (Image Comics); Giga (Vault Comics), The Picture of Everything Else (Vault Comics) | |
| 2021 | Clayton Cowles | Aquaman (DC Comics), Batman (DC Comics), Batman and the Outsiders (DC Comics), Strange Adventures (DC Comics), Superman: Man of Tomorrow (DC Comics), Superman's Pal Jimmy Olsen (DC Comics); Adventureman (Image Comics), Bitter Root (Image Comics), Bog Bodies (Image Comics), Die (Image Comics); Reaver (Image Comics/Skybound Entertainment); Morbius (Marvel Comics), X of Swords (Marvel Comics) | |
| 2021 | Rus Wooton | Wonder Woman: Dead Earth (DC Comics); Decorum (Image Comics), Monstress (Image Comics); Die!Die!Die! (Image Comics/Skybound Entertainment), Fire Power (Image Comics/Skybound Entertainment), Oblivion Song (Image Comics/Skybound Entertainment), Outcast (Image Comics/Skybound Entertainment), Stillwater (Image Comics/Skybound Entertainment) | |
| 2022 | Barry Windsor-Smith | Monsters (Fantagraphics) | |
| 2022 | Wes Abbott | Future State, Nightwing, Suicide Squad, Wonder Woman Black & Gold (DC) | |
| 2022 | Clayton Cowles | The Amazons, Batman, Batman/Catwoman, Strange Adventures, Wonder Woman Historia (DC); Adventureman (Image); Daredevil, Eternals, King in Black, Strange Academy, Venom, X-Men Hickman, X-Men Duggan (Marvel) | |
| 2022 | Crank! | Jonna and the Unpossible Monsters, The Tea Dragon Tapestry (Oni); Money Shot (Vault) | |
| 2022 | Ed Dukeshire | Once & Future, Seven Secrets (BOOM Studios) | |
| 2023 | Stan Sakai | Usagi Yojimbo (IDW) | |
| 2023 | Pat Brosseau | Batman: The Knight, Wonder Woman: The Villainy of Our Fears (DC): Creepshow, Dark Ride, I Hate This Place, Skybound Presents: Afterschool (Image Skybound) | |
| 2023 | Chris Dickey | The Night Eaters: She Eats the Night (Abrams ComicArts) | |
| 2023 | Todd Klein | Chivalry (Dark Horse); Fables (DC); Miracleman by Gaiman & Buckingham: The Silver Age (Marvel) | |
| 2023 | Nate Piekos | Black Hammer Reborn, Minor Threats, Shaolin Cowboy, Stranger Things: Kamchatka (Dark Horse), I Hate Fairyland, Twig (Image) | |
| 2024 | Hassan Otsmane-Elhaou | The Unlikely Story of Felix and Macabber, The Witcher: Wild Animals, and others (Dark Horse); Batman: City of Madness, The Flash, Poison Ivy, and others (DC); Black Cat Social Club (Humanoids); Beneath the Trees Where Nobody Sees (IDW); The Cull, What’s the Furthest Place from Here? (Image); and others | |
| 2024 | Lauren Bowes | Inside the Mind of Sherlock Holmes (Titan Comics) | |
| 2024 | E. M. Carroll | A Guest in the House (First Second/Macmillan) | |
| 2024 | Bill Griffith | Three Rocks (Abrams ComicArts) | |
| 2024 | Richard Starkings | Barnstormers: A Ballad of Love and Murder, Canary (Comixology Originals/Best Jackett); Parliament of Rooks (Comixology); Astro City, Battle Chasers (Image); Conan the Barbarian (Titan Comics) | |
| 2024 | Rus Wooton | Monstress, The Sacrificers (Image); Fire Power, Kroma, Transformers, The Walking Dead Deluxe, Universal Monsters: Dracula, Void Rivals (Image Skybound); Hunt. Kill. Repeat., A Legacy of Violence, Nature’s Labyrinth (Mad Cave) | |
| 2025 | Clayton Cowles | Animal Pound (BOOM! Studios); FML, Helen of Wyndhorn (Dark Horse); Absolute Batman, Batman, Batman & Robin: Year One, Birds of Prey, Jenny Sparks, Wonder Woman (DC); Strange Academy, Venom (Marvel) | |
| 2025 | Becca Carey | Absolute Superman, Absolute Wonder Woman, Plastic Man No More! (DC); Radiant Black, Rogue Sun (Image); When the Blood Has Dried, Murder Kingdom (Mad Cave Studios) | |
| 2025 | Leela Corman | Victory Parade (Pantheon) | |
| 2025 | Emil Ferris | My Favorite Thing Is Monsters, Book Two (Fantagraphics) | |
| 2025 | Nate Powell | Fall Through (Abrams ComicArts); Lies My Teacher Told Me (New Press) | |
| 2026 | Hassan Otsmane-Elhaou | Ill Vacation, Stillman (Comixology Originals); Absolute Martian Manhunter, Challengers of the Unknown, DC K.O., The Flash, Green Arrow, Poison Ivy (DC); Beneath the Trees Where Nobody Sees, The Exorcism at 1600 Penn, Starship Godzilla, (IDW); Author Immortal (Image); Our-Soot-Stained Heart (Mad Cave) | |
| 2026 | Janice Chiang | Acro and the Cat, All Upon a Time, Beyond the Aural Vault, Republica, Solarblader (Sandstorm); John Carpenter’s Blood of the Taken: Next of Kin, Pause, Tales of Science Fiction (Storm King) | |
| 2026 | Clayton Cowles | Absolute Batman, Batman, Batman & Robin: Year One, Birds of Prey, Black Canary: Best of the Best, Trinity: Daughter of Wonder Woman, Wonder Woman, (DC); Daredevil: Cold Day in Hell #1-3 (Marvel) | |
| 2026 | Nate Piekos | American Caper #1, Archie Vs. Minor Threats, Black Hammer: Spiral City, The Brood, Minor Threats: The Last Devil Left Alive, Stranger Things and Dungeons & Dragons, The Umbrella Academy Plan B, Welcome to Twilight (Dark Horse); I Hate Fairyland (Image) | |
| 2026 | Ben Wickey | More Weight: A Salem Story (Top Shelf) | |

== Multiple awards and nominations ==
The following individuals have won Best Letterer two or more times:

| Letterer | Wins | Nominations |
|---|---|---|
| Todd Klein | 18 | 19 |
| Stan Sakai | 7 | 14 |
| Chris Ware | 2 | 12 |
| Hassan Otsmane-Elhaou | 2 | 0 |

The following individuals have received two or more nominations but never won Best Letterer:

| Letterer | Nominations |
|---|---|
| Dave Sim | 8 |
| Dan Clowes | 6 |
| Richard Starkings / Comicraft | 5 |
| Jimmy Gownley | 4 |
| Tom Orzechowski | 3 |
| John Workman | 3 |
| Richard Sala | 3 |
| Deron Bennett | 3 |
| Bill Yoshida | 2 |
| Troy Little | 2 |
| Jim Campbell | 2 |
| Nate Piekos | 2 |
| Emil Ferris | 2 |
| Nate Powell | 2 |

== See also ==
- Eisner Award for Best Publication for Early Readers
- Eisner Award for Best Academic/Scholarly Work
- Eisner Award for Best Writer
- Eisner Award for Best Cover Artist
- Eisner Award for Best Coloring
