= Collin Kelly and Jackson Lanzing =

American film, TV, and comics writing duo

Collin Kelly
- Kelly at Dragon Con in 2026
- Born: Collin Kelly Kauaʻi, Hawaii
- Area: Writer

Jackson Lanzing
- Lanzing at Dragon Con in 2026
- Born: Jackson Lanzing Santa Cruz, California
- Area: Writer

Collin Kelly and Jackson Lanzing are an American writing duo known primarily for their work on comics and streaming series. They are colloquially known as the "Hivemind."

They have worked for DC Comics, Marvel Comics, IDW Publishing and other independent comic companies. In 2023, they were nominated for the "Best New Series" Eisner Award for Star Trek. They were also the lead writers and executive producers for Kings of Atlantis (2017).

== Career ==
=== 2014–2020 ===
Kelly and Lanzing met and became friends when they both went to USC to study film, bonding over comics. Per Kelly: "Comics let us write stories — stories weirder and more wonderful than Hollywood would ever dream of green-lighting — and then within six months, they can be on the shelves. In comics, you can actually tell stories that people can READ; for a writer, that's the first step towards happiness." Their first script together was "a Samurai vs. Feral Monster movie called Sundown." Their first major comic writing credit was a 2014 four-issue mini-series with Boom! Studios called Hacktivist, where they collaborated with Alyssa Milano and artist Marcus To. They followed that up with a six-issue sequel.

In 2016, they got their first writing job for DC Comics, where they wrote issues of Batman and Robin Eternal, and then took over writing Grayson from Tom King and Tim Seeley. Their first creator-owned series, published in 2016 through Boom! Studios, was Joyride, where they teamed up again with artist Marcus To to tell the story of some disaffected teenagers who steal a spaceship, which AiPT called a "space epic with a punk-rock attitude." The book lasted twelve issues and they followed it up with Zojaquan, published in 2017 through Vault Comics, a fantasy comic about a woman who wakes up on a primordial world.

In 2016, Lanzing became the gamemaster for the actual play series VAST which premiered on the Alpha streaming service by Legendary Digital Networks and Kelly appeared as a player in the series. In 2017, the second season streamed on Geek & Sundry's Twitch channel. They were the lead writers and executive producers for Kings of Atlantis (2017), the "first-ever animated kids series from YouTube Originals."

In 2017, they wrote Gotham City Garage, a mini-series set in a dystopian Elseworld inspired by DC Collectibles' Gotham City Garage statues. Per Kelly: "Gotham City Garage is an anti-fascist anthem for the open road, starring reimagined takes on DC's great female characters through an outlaw lens. We're bringing Big Barda, Steel, Catwoman, Harley Quinn, Silver Banshee, Hawkgirl and the first Kryptonian this world has ever seen--the mysterious girl named Kara Gordon--into a world of bikes, outlaws and elaborate tattoos." The series lasted twelve issues.

In 2018, they took over writing the book Green Arrow starting with issue #48 and wrote it until issue #50, when it was cancelled. In 2019, they became the writers for DC's six-issue gen:LOCK mini-series. Also in 2019, they were announced as the showrunners of Star Trek: Year Five for IDW, which told the "final year of the Enterprise's original five-year mission." Lanzing spoke at WonderCon 2019 about it:

To me it is one of the greatest unanswered questions of Star Trek canon: how did the five-year mission end? How did we end up where we begin in Star Trek: The Motion Picture? How do these characters – the last time we saw them in season three – function so strongly as a family and so strongly as a crew. How do we then find them splintered – particularly with Spock – at the beginning of The Motion Picture?

=== 2020–present ===
The Star Trek series ran for twenty-five issues and ended in 2021. In 2022, IDW announced that Kelly and Lanzing were the writers of their new Star Trek comic which would include bring together "characters from across the galaxy--and all eras and variations of the beloved franchise--who must band together to prevent the mysterious murder of the gods." As of 2024, it is still ongoing and has spun off several other comics, such as Star Trek: Defiant.

In 2021, they wrote their first work for Marvel Comics, a five-issue mini-series for Kang the Conqueror. Per Kelly: "We are hoping to, by the end of issue five, take you through the entirety of King's [sic] life. So that any Kang story that you have read over the course of the last several decades, you can look at it and see where it fits inside the secret history of Kang the Conqueror, and the personal story he's been through." Also in 2021, with Brandon Sanderson, they wrote the graphic novel Dark One, through Vault Comics.

Collin Kelly and Jackson Lanzing, Hivemind, writers, at Dragon Con in Atlanta Ga September 6 2026

In 2022, they wrote the one-shot Devil's Reign: Winter Soldier, which explored the dark past of Bucky Barnes and led into the announcement of their ongoing Captain America series, Captain America: Sentinel of Liberty. "Steve is a member of the Greatest Generation. That's so important, especially now, because he's seen so much of the 20th century and he's really able to weigh it." In 2023, they crossed over their book with the Sam Wilson-led Captain America: Symbol of Truth, written by Tochi Onyebuchi, in a crossover titled "Cold War." Sentinel of Liberty came to an end after thirteen issues, with the book leading into Captain America #750 and Captain America Finale.

Starting in 2022, they wrote two mini-series for DC: Batman Beyond: Neo-Year and Aquaman & the Flash: Voidsong. The next year, they wrote a follow-up to Neo-Year, Batman Beyond: Neo-Gothic. The same year, they wrote the oversized one-shot Batman: One Bad Day -- Clayface. Per Kelly, "We love the character and that entire side of Gotham -- that goopy, monstrous side of Gotham."

In 2023, they were announced as the writers for the new volume of Guardians of the Galaxy with artist Kev Walker. The driving force of the series was an event called "Grootfall." The series lasted ten issues and an annual. They were also announced as the writers for the new volume of Thunderbolts, focusing on a team led by Bucky Barnes; the series ran from December 2023 to March 2024 with four issues total. In 2024, it was announced that the series would receive a sequel, Thunderbolts: Doomstrike, during Marvel's "One World Under Doom" event. The five issue limited series started in February 2025.

They also were the writers for 2023's Timeless #1, an annual issue exploring Marvel's future storylines. That year, they also published their first middle-grade novel, Thor Quest: Hammer of the Gods, through Disney Books. In 2023, it was announced that they would be writing a new volume of Outsiders for DC, about Luke Fox and Kate Kane exploring mysteries of the DC universe. Per Lanzing, "What does it mean to live in that kind of universe? What does it mean to be a historian or an archaeologist in that kind of universe? And what does it mean to try to understand your place in a constantly shifting, changing, rebooting universe?" The series came to an end after eleven issues.

In 2024, they were part of the X-Men: From the Ashes relaunch for the X-Men, writing the ongoing series NYX (vol. 2). Per Lanzing: "The cool thing about teen superhero books is that [characters] tend not to come together over a big threat. They tend to instead be a lot closer to hang out or friendship books. They tend to be a little bit closer to a teen drama, than they do to a big action extravaganza." NYX (vol. 2) ran for ten issues with its finale scheduled for release in April 2025. Lanzing commented that they knew in advance NYX would end so they were able to include a finale for the characters, however, Kamala 's story would continue in the Giant-Size X-Men Anniversary Event. With artist Adam Kubert, the two wrote the one-shot Giant-Size X-Men #1 (May 2025).

They also wrote the tie-in limited series Venom War: Spider-Man (2024).

== Awards and nominations ==
| Year | Work | Award | Category | Result | Ref. |
|---|---|---|---|---|---|
| 2023 | Star Trek | Eisner Awards | Best New Series | Nominated | |

== Personal lives ==
Collin Kelly is a professor at USC School of Cinematic Arts. Jackson Lanzing is a creative director in brand marketing. They both live in Los Angeles, California, minutes away from each other.

== Bibliography ==
=== Novels ===
- Thor Quest: Hammer of the Gods, with illustrations by Billy Young (Disney Books, July 25, 2023, ISBN 9781368074353)

=== DC Comics ===
- Aquaman and the Flash: Voidsong #1-3 (2022)
- Are You Afraid of Darkseid #1, short story "The Endless Staircase" (2021)
- Batman
  - Batman & Robin Eternal #9-10, 15-16 (2016)
  - Batman Secret Files #1, short story "He Help Us" (2019)
  - Batman: One Bad Day – Clayface #1 (2023)
  - Batman: The Brave and the Bold (vol. 2) #3-4, stories "City of Monsters" and "Enter the Abyss" (2023)
  - Batman: Urban Legends #7, story "Batman Beyond: Wake" (2021)
- Batman Beyond:
  - Batman Beyond: Neo-Year #1-6 (2022)
  - Batman Beyond: Neo-Gothic #1-6 (2023–2024)
- DC Nuclear Winter Special #1, short story "Warmth" (2019)
- DC's Beach Blankent Bad Guys Summer Special #1, short story "Independence" (2018)
- Dog Days of Summer #1, short story "The Crucible" (2019)
- gen:LOCK (digital) #1-14 (2019–2020)
- Gotham City Garage #1-12 (2017–2018)
- Grayson #18-20, Annual #3 (2016)
- Green Arrow (vol. 6) #39-40, 48-50 (2018, 2019)
- Let Them Live!: Unpublished Tales from the DC Vault #2, short story "Without a Net" (2021)
- Nightwing (vol. 4) #42 (2018)
- Outsiders (vol. 5) #1-11 (2024)
- Strange Love Adventures #1, short story "Romance on Dinosaur Island" (2022)
- Tales from Earth-6: A Celebration of Stan Lee #1, short story "Contingency" (2023)
- Tales from the Dark Multiverse: Dark Nights Metal #1 (2021)
- Wonder Woman Annual (vol. 5) #1, short story "The Last Kaiju" (2017)
- Young Monsters in Love #1, short story "The Dead Can Dance" (2018)

=== Marvel Comics ===
- Alien: Black, White, and Blood #1-4, four-part story "Utopia" (2024)
- Captain America:
  - Devil's Reign: Winter Soldier #1 (2022)
  - Captain America (vol. 10) #0 (2022)
  - Captain America: Sentinel of Liberty (vol. 2) #1-13 (2022–2023)
  - Captain America and the Winter Soldier Special #1 (2022)
  - Captain America: Cold War Alpha #1 (2023)
  - Captain America: Cold War Omega #1 (2023)
  - Captain America (vol. 1) #750, story "Nothing But a Fight" (2023)
  - Captain America Finale #1 (2023)
- Guardians of the Galaxy (vol. 7) #1-10, Annual (vol. 5) #1 (2023–2024)
- Kang the Conqueror #1-5 (2021–2022)
- NYX (vol. 2) #1-10 (2024–2025)
- Thor Annual (vol. 6) #1, story "Mythos" (2023)
- Spider-Man:
  - Edge of Spider-Verse (vol. 4) #1, short story "New Toys" (2024)
  - Venom War: Spider-Man #1-4 (2024)
- Thunderbolts:
  - Thunderbolts (vol. 5) #1-4 (2023–2024)
  - Thunderbolts: Doomstrike #1-5 (2025)
- Timeless:
  - Timeless (vol 3) #1 (2023)
  - Power Man: Timeless #1-present (2025)

=== Other Publishers ===
==== Ape Entertainment ====
- Penguins of Madagascar #1 (2010) (Lanzing only)

==== Boom! Studios ====
- Regular Show #18 (2014)
- Hacktivist #1-4 (2014)
- Hacktivist vol. 2 #1-6 (2015)
- Joyride #1-12 (2016–2017)

==== IDW Comics ====
- Star Trek: Waypoint Special #1, short story "My Human is Not" (2018)
- Star Trek: Year Five #1-25 (2019–2021)
- Star Trek #400, short story "A Perfect System" (2022)
- Star Trek: Klingons #1 (2022)
- Star Trek #1-present (2022–present)
- Star Trek Annual 2023 #1 (2023)
- Star Trek: Day of Blood #1 (2023)
- Star Trek Annual 2024 #1 (2024)
- Star Trek: The Last Starship #1-present (2025-present)

==== Valiant Entertainment ====
- Valiant: FCBD Special 2021, Harbinger short story (2021)

==== Magma Comix ====
- The Principles of Necromancy #1-4 (2024)

==== Vault Comics ====
- Brandon Sanderson's Dark One (2021)
- Wifwulf (2024)
- Zojaqan #1-5

== Filmography ==
=== Web series and streaming ===
| Title | Network | Year | Credited as | | | Role | Notes |
| Title | Network | Year | Writer | Producer | Actor | Role | Notes |
|---|---|---|---|---|---|---|---|
| Titansgrave: The Ashes of Valkana | Geek & Sundry | 2015 | Yes | No | No | | Episode: "Staff of Forlorn Hope" (Lanzing only); Lanzing was also an author on the Titansgrave: The Ashes of Valkana role-playing game sourcebook |
| VAST | Alpha/Geek & Sundry | 2016–2017 | —N/a | Yes | Yes | Gamemaster (Lanzing); This Might be a Good Idea (Kelly) | VAST has no writers in the traditional sense as it is an actual play web series; it relies on improvisation and collaborative storytelling through a role-playing game system. |
| Kings of Atlantis | YouTube Originals | 2017 | Yes | Yes | No | | 13 episodes |
| Beyond the Dark | Shudder | 2022 | Yes | No | No | | Episode: "Pipe" |
