= Dark One =

Dark one or Dark One may refer to:

- Dark Lord, a fictional stock character who is a powerful villain with evil henchmen
- Dark One (The Wheel of Time), the primary antagonist in the Wheel of Time series
- Dark One (graphic novel), a graphic novel series created by Brandon Sanderson
