= Black Hammer (comics) =

American comic book series

- Cover of Black Hammer #1 (July 2016). Art by Dean Ormston.

Publication information
- Publisher: Dark Horse Comics
- Schedule: Monthly
- Format: Ongoing
- Genre: Superhero; Metafiction
- Publication date: July 2016 – 2024

Creative team
- Created by: Jeff Lemire; Dean Ormston
- Written by: Jeff Lemire
- Artist(s): Dean Ormston (2016–2019); Caitlin Yarsky (2021–2022); Malachi Ward (2021–2023)
- Letterer(s): Todd Klein (2016–2019); Nate Piekos (2019–present)
- Colorist: Dave Stewart
- Editor(s): Brendan Wright (#1–7); Daniel Chabon (#1–present)

Collected editions
- 1. Secret Origins: ISBN 9781616557867
- 2. The Event: ISBN 9781506701981
- 3. Age of Doom – Part 1: ISBN 9781506703893
- 4. Age of Doom – Part 2: ISBN 9781506708164
- 5. Reborn – Part 1: ISBN 9781506714264
- 6. Reborn – Part 2: ISBN 9781506715155
- 7. Reborn – Part 3: ISBN 9781506720159
- Streets of Spiral: ISBN 9781506709413
- Visions – Vol. 1: ISBN 9781506723266
- Visions – Vol. 2: ISBN 9781506725512

Black Hammer is an ongoing American comic series created by writer Jeff Lemire and artist Dean Ormston, published by Dark Horse Comics.

== Plot ==
Ten years ago, Black Hammer and six other superheroes saved Spiral City from the Anti-God, but in the process became trapped in Rockwood, a timeless Twilight Zone-ish town. Shortly after the heroes arrived, Black Hammer died while trying to escape. In the present, the six heroes live on Black Hammer farm with very little hope of ever escaping Rockwood.

== Publication history ==
=== Phase I ===
Jeff Lemire originally conceived of Black Hammer in 2007, intending to draw the story himself after the end of Essex County. In 2008, he pitched the series to Dark Horse editor Diana Schutz. The pitch was accepted, but Lemire was unable to begin work until he finished The Nobody and Sweet Tooth for Vertigo, then his exclusivity contract for DC Comics prevented him from working on the series from 2010 to 2014. When Lemire returned to the series in 2014, he was working on so many projects that drawing it himself was no longer possible, so he teamed up with artist Dean Ormston for the title. According to Lemire, it was important for Black Hammer not to look anything like mainstream superhero comics. He wanted the series to stand outside of superhero comics and comment on them, not become one of them. For this, Ormston's art style was deemed perfect.

Black Hammer #1 was originally scheduled for release March 2015, but Ormston suffered a cerebral hemorrhage, which left the right side of his body partially paralyzed. After months of rehabilitation, Ormston recovered. The first issue of Black Hammer came out July the following year. Lemire continued working on the series while Ormston recovered. Dean Ormston's working pace was greatly reduced, so he sometimes worked with layout assistance from Peter Gross. Because of this, Lemire has scripts written well ahead of the release schedule.

In 2017, Jeff Lemire started to expand the Black Hammer universe with spinoff titles, starting with Sherlock Frankenstein and the Legion of Evil. The spinoffs are identified by a "From the world of Black Hammer" banner along the top of the cover. Early on, Black Hammer and its spinoffs were frequently referred to as "The Hammerverse" (not to be confused with David Drake's Hammerverse) by editor Daniel Chabon in the letter columns, though the official branding is now "The World of Black Hammer".

==== Sherlock Frankenstein and the Legion of Evil ====
In October 2017, shortly after the cliffhanger ending of Black Hammer #13, Dark Horse Comics launched Sherlock Frankenstein and the Legion of Evil, the first Black Hammer spinoff miniseries, written by Jeff Lemire with art by David Rubín. The series focused on Lucy Weber, a young investigative reporter searching for the truth about what happened ten years ago when her father, the Black Hammer, disappeared. The miniseries introduced numerous characters that would go on to play larger roles in future stories, such as Cthu-Louise and Grimjim.

==== Doctor Andromeda and the Kingdom of Lost Tomorrows ====
Originally published as Doctor Star and the Kingdom of Lost Tomorrows, this second Black Hammer spinoff miniseries was written by Jeff Lemire with art by Max Fiumara was launched in December 2017. The series focuses on Doctor Star (later renamed Doctor Andromeda), a Golden Age superhero and contemporary of Abraham Slam.

The series was retitled "Doctor Andromeda and the Kingdom of Lost Tomorrows" following a legal issue with another publisher. As Lemire himself explained in a 2020 interview:

"I have been cagey about this because the honest truth is that there was a legal issue with the name and its similarity to another publisher's character and there is very little I can actually discuss. But we worked it out very amicably with that other publisher and we agreed to change his name and costume a bit. Not any drama or anything, it was all very civil. The good thing is the name changed, but the story is exactly the same. And that original printing of Doctor Star trades and floppies will probably be collector's items to a degree now, I guess. This being Black Hammer, I do have a fun meta way of explaining the name change within the universe itself that will unfold next year in some new Black Hammer projects".

Doctor Andromeda originally appeared in a cameo role in the original Black Hammer series as an homage to Starman, specifically the incarnation written by James Robinson, to the point that the character's alter ego was named "Jimmy Robinson".

==== Black Hammer: Age of Doom ====
Black Hammer series ended and was relaunched as Black Hammer: Age of Doom in 2018. Lemire explained the name change in a press release:

"One thing Black Hammer has always done is comment on the history of superhero comics and we live in a world where superhero universes seem to be rebooted, relaunched, and rebirthed every year. It felt like we needed to play around with that idea, but put a Black Hammer spin on it".

Age of Doom finished the story that Lemire had originally pitched to Dark Horse about the superheroes stranded on Black Hammer farm. However, in a July 2019 interview, he explained this was simply the end of Phase I, and went on to tease developments for Phase II with more spinoffs and a new core Black Hammer series.

==== The Quantum Age ====
The Quantum Age, a spinoff set in 2141 (originally 3041, but this date was revised in the trade paperback) about a group of superheroes, inspired by the heroes of Black Hammer Farm, was released in March 2018. The series deals with some of the aftermath of Age of Doom.

==== Black Hammer ’45 ====
Black Hammer ’45, a four-issue miniseries about the Black Hammer Squadron in World War II, was published in December 2018. This miniseries marked the first time a Black Hammer title wasn't solely written by Jeff Lemire, with Ray Fawkes joining as co-writer. Matt Kindt, who had previously worked on the Black Hammer: Giant-Sized Annual, returned as the artist.

=== Phase II ===
==== Skulldigger + Skeleton Boy ====
Just prior to SDCC 2019, Newsarama announced Skulldigger + Skeleton Boy, a six-issue miniseries about the vigilante Skulldigger, written by Jeff Lemire with art by Tonci Zonjic. The series had previously been mentioned in the Stranger Things / Black Hammer Free Comic Book Day 2019 issue and in The World of Black Hammer Encyclopedia. Jeff Lemire said that this book would be the first title in "Phase II" of the Black Hammer universe. Early on, Lemire had planned on drawing the series himself, but he couldn't find time in his schedule.

==== Colonel Weird: Cosmagog ====
Colonel Weird: Cosmagog, a four-issue miniseries was published in October 2020, written by Jeff Lemire with art by Tyler Crook. It looks at Colonel Randall Weird's past and his future beyond the ending of Black Hammer: Age of Doom. Lemire described the series as a bridge from the Phase I Black Hammer series to the stories he has planned for the future.

==== Barbalien: Red Planet ====
Barbalien: Red Planet, a five-issue miniseries written by Jeff Lemire and Tate Brombal with art by Gabriel Hernández Walta was announced in spring 2020. The miniseries explores Mark Markz's time as a police officer during the 1980s AIDS crisis. It was originally scheduled to launch in LGBTQ Pride Month, but was delayed due to the COVID-19 pandemic.

==== Black Hammer: Visions ====
In November 2020, Dark Horse announced an eight-issue anthology series, with each story from different creative teams. Lemire has clarified that Visions is not in continuity.

==== Black Hammer: Reborn ====
This will be the core title of Phase II. It will be a twelve-issue series with a new artist, Caitlin Yarsky. Dean Ormston will continue to work in the World of Black Hammer on another title with more of a horror focus. The series jumps ahead twenty years after the finale of Black Hammer: Age of Doom with Lucy living in the suburbs with her partner and children. Lemire described it as "Lucy Weber's Mid-Life Crisis on Multiple Earths". It will focus on Lucy Weber as the new Black Hammer and include Skulldigger in a prominent role as well as many other returning characters.

==== The Unbelievable Unteens ====
Dark Horse announced a new spinoff reuniting Jeff Lemire and Tyler Crook, The Unbelievable Unteens in May 2021. This story is set to focus on comic artist Jane Ito meeting one of her comics creations. Earlier that year, Lemire had posted a teaser image by Crook featuring Jack Sabbath holding the fictional final issue of The Incredible Unteens.

==== The Last Days of Black Hammer ====
In March 2022, Lemire launched The Last Days of Black Hammer, a 110-page comic that was serialized weekly through his newsletter, Tales from the Farm. Drawn by Stefano Simeone, this story is a prequel to the original Black Hammer run, set in 1986 and focused on Joe Weber and his family.

==== Colonel Weird and Little Andromeda ====
Like The Last Days of Black Hammer, Colonel Weird and Little Andromeda was originally serialized through Jeff Lemire's Tales from the Farm newsletter. Written by Tate Brombal, the series has work from many artists. Ray Fawkes drew the framing sequences, while Tyler Bence, Shawn Kuruneru, Ariela Kristantina, Dani, Marguerite Sauvage, Andrea Sorrentino, Tyler Crook, Yuko Shimizu, and Nick Robles all drew self-contained stories within the framework. The series introduced the character Willow D. Whisper, created by Tate Brombal and Dani.

==== Black Hammer: The End ====
In September 2021, Lemire posted an image on Instagram teasing Black Hammer: The End. After it was announced that he had entered into an exclusive deal with Image Comics, Lemire posted a newsletter explaining what this would mean for Black Hammer—that the deal had an exemption for all his Black Hammer work. However, he also mentioned that he was planning to bring Black Hammer to an end in 2023. He has since clarified that The End will wrap up all the storylines that have been building over the last few years, and will set the stage for a whole new era of Black Hammer stories in 2024 and beyond.

=== Phase III ===
==== Black Hammer: Spiral City ====
In July 2024, Dark Horse Comics announced a new seven-issue miniseries, Black Hammer: Spiral City, the first in a new phase, written by Jeff Lemire and drawn by Teddy Kristiansen. The series debuted November 2024.

==== Black Hammer: Forever ====
At the 2026 San Diego Comic-Con, while celebrating the tenth anniversary of the series, a new 12-issue miniseries was announced for 2027, Black Hammer: Forever, written by Jeff Lemire and drawn by Mark Buckingham.

=== Crossovers ===
Beginning in July 2019, Dark Horse Comics and DC Comics released "Hammer of Justice," a five-issue Black Hammer and Justice League crossover miniseries, written by Jeff Lemire and drawn by Michael Walsh. In the initial announcement, Lemire assured readers he would keep Black Hammer character-driven and free of unnecessary tie-ins and events. "Hammer of Justice!" is not "a throwaway imaginary story" and will have lasting repercussions for future stories in continuity.

As to the topic of further crossovers in future, Lemire said: "If there is a very good story to be told, I am open to it, but I doubt we will see many, or any, other crossovers in the future. This particular opportunity really worked and was a great once in a lifetime chance to tell a really fun story". He has mentioned that artist Dean Ormston would like to do a Hellboy crossover if Mike Mignola was interested.

=== Future ===
In his email newsletter, Lemire has spoken about a few upcoming titles that have yet to be formally announced. Dean Ormston will be drawing a Madame Dragonfly miniseries. Following Black Hammer: The End, Lemire said he aimed to bring the series back to one core Black Hammer book for a while.

Lemire has also mentioned he'd like to do a sequel to The Quantum Age called The Quantum World with artist Wilfredo Torres. He's also mentioned that he intends to come back to Black Hammer at some point after The End, when he's had a few years' break, to do a Golden Gail story. He has also mentioned wanting to do something special for the series' tenth anniversary.

=== Tales from the Farm online stories ===
In September 2021, Lemire launched a new iteration of his Tales from the Farm newsletter through Substack, a place where paying subscribers would have access to behind-the-scenes material and new stories. On January 31, 2022, he began the first of several planned World of Black Hammer projects.

On September 1, 2022, Lemire posted that he would no longer be serializing stories through the newsletter due to increased demands on his schedule. (He was showrunning the Essex County television adaptation at the time.) The Colonel Weird and Little Andromeda story was left incomplete until its hardcover collection in March the following year. On this topic, Lemire said, "I naïvely thought I could juggle comics with doing that show, but it just became obvious that it was like a full-time job ... The last year has been basically just the show."

== Issues ==
Phase I
Series	Issue	Release date	Story	Art	Colors	Letters	Cover
Black; Hammer	#1	July 20, 2016	Jeff Lemire	Dean Ormston	Dave Stewart	Todd Klein	Dean Ormston; Jeff Lemire (variant); Dustin Nguyen (SDCC 2016 variant); Fábio Moon (ECCC 2018 variant)
Black; Hammer	#2	August 17, 2016	Jeff Lemire	Dean Ormston	Dave Stewart	Todd Klein	Dean Ormston; Jeff Lemire (variants)
Black; Hammer	#3	September 21, 2016	Jeff Lemire	Dean Ormston	Dave Stewart	Todd Klein	Dean Ormston; Jeff Lemire (variants)
Black; Hammer	#4	October 19, 2016	Jeff Lemire	Dean Ormston	Dave Stewart	Todd Klein	Dean Ormston; Jeff Lemire (variants)
Black; Hammer	#5	November 16, 2016	Jeff Lemire	Dean Ormston	Dave Stewart	Todd Klein	Dean Ormston; Jeff Lemire (variants)
Black; Hammer	#6	December 21, 2016	Jeff Lemire	Dean Ormston	Dave Stewart	Todd Klein	Dean Ormston; Jeff Lemire (variants)
Black; Hammer	Giant-Sized; Annual (2017)	January 18, 2017	Jeff Lemire	Michael Allred; Ray Fawkes; Matt Kindt; Emi Lenox; Dustin Nguyen; Nate Powell	Ray Fawkes; Sharlene Kindt; Dave Stewart	Todd Klein	Jeff Lemire
Black; Hammer	#7	March 22, 2017	Jeff Lemire	Dean Ormston	Dave Stewart	Todd Klein	Dean Ormston; Jeff Lemire (variants)
Black; Hammer	#8	April 19, 2017	Jeff Lemire	Dean Ormston	Dave Stewart	Todd Klein	Dean Ormston; Jeff Lemire (variants)
Black; Hammer	#9	May 24, 2017	Jeff Lemire	David Rubín			David Rubín; Jeff Lemire (variant)
Black; Hammer	#10	June 21, 2017	Jeff Lemire	Dean Ormston	Dave Stewart	Todd Klein	Dean Ormston; Jeff Lemire (variants)
Black; Hammer	#11	July 26, 2017	Jeff Lemire	Dean Ormston	Dave Stewart	Todd Klein	Dean Ormston; Jeff Lemire (variants)
Black; Hammer	#12	August 23, 2017	Jeff Lemire	David Rubín			David Rubín; Jeff Lemire (variant)
Black; Hammer	#13	September 20, 2017	Jeff Lemire	Dean Ormston	Dave Stewart	Todd Klein	Dean Ormston; Jeff Lemire (variant)
Sherlock; Frankenstein and the Legion of Evil	#1	October 18, 2017	Jeff Lemire	David Rubín			David Rubín; Mike Mignola (variant); Darren Warren Johnson (ECCC 2018 variant)
Sherlock; Frankenstein and the Legion of Evil	#2	November 22, 2017	Jeff Lemire	David Rubín			David Rubín; Dean Ormston (variant)
Sherlock; Frankenstein and the Legion of Evil	#3	December 20, 2017	Jeff Lemire	David Rubín			David Rubín; Duncan Fegredo (variant)
Sherlock; Frankenstein and the Legion of Evil	#4	January 24, 2018	Jeff Lemire	David Rubín			David Rubín; Jeff Lemire (variant)
Doctor Star and the Kingdom of Lost Tomorrows	#1	March 7, 2018	Jeff Lemire	Max Fiumara	Dave Stewart	Nate Piekos	Max Fiumara; Declan Shalvey & Jordie Bellaire (variant); Jeff Lemire (ComicsPRO variant)
Doctor Star and the Kingdom of Lost Tomorrows	#2	April 4, 2018	Jeff Lemire	Max Fiumara	Dave Stewart	Nate Piekos	Max Fiumara; J.G. Jones (variant)
Doctor Star and the Kingdom of Lost Tomorrows	#3	May 2, 2018	Jeff Lemire	Max Fiumara	Dave Stewart	Nate Piekos	Max Fiumara; Dustin Nguyen (variant)
Doctor Star and the Kingdom of Lost Tomorrows	#4	June 6, 2018	Jeff Lemire	Max Fiumara	Dave Stewart	Nate Piekos	Max Fiumara; Annie Wu (variant)
Black; Hammer: Age of Doom	#1	April 18, 2018	Jeff Lemire	Dean Ormston	Dave Stewart	Todd Klein	Dean Ormston; Skottie Young (variant); Rafael Albuquerque (2018 Diamond Retailer Summit variant); James Stokoe (C2E2 2018 variant)
Black; Hammer: Age of Doom	#2	May 23, 2018	Jeff Lemire	Dean Ormston	Dave Stewart	Todd Klein	Dean Ormston; Jeff Lemire (variant)
Black; Hammer: Age of Doom	#3	June 20, 2018	Jeff Lemire	Dean Ormston	Dave Stewart	Todd Klein	Dean Ormston; Michael Cho (variant)
Black; Hammer: Age of Doom	#4	August 22, 2018	Jeff Lemire	Dean Ormston	Dave Stewart	Todd Klein	Dean Ormston; James Harren (variant)
Black; Hammer: Age of Doom	#5	September 19, 2018	Jeff Lemire	Dean Ormston	Dave Stewart	Todd Klein	Dean Ormston; Fábio Moon (variant)
Black; Hammer: Age of Doom	#6	October 17, 2018	Jeff Lemire	Rich Tommaso			Rich Tommaso; Farel Dalrymple (variant)
Black; Hammer: Age of Doom	#7	November 21, 2018	Jeff Lemire	Rich Tommaso			Rich Tommaso; Christian Ward (variant)
Black; Hammer	FCBD 2018: Overwatch / Black Hammer "The Quantum Age"	May 5, 2018	Jeff Lemire	Dean Ormston; Wilfredo Torres	Dave Stewart	Todd Klein	N/A
The; Quantum; Age	#1	July 4, 2018	Jeff Lemire	Wilfredo Torres	Dave Stewart	Nate Piekos	Wilfredo Torres; Christian Ward (variant); Marcos Martín (SDCC 2018 variant)
The; Quantum; Age	#2	August 1, 2018	Jeff Lemire	Wilfredo Torres	Dave Stewart	Nate Piekos	Wilfredo Torres; Andrew MacLean (variant)
The; Quantum; Age	#3	October 10, 2018	Jeff Lemire	Wilfredo Torres	Dave Stewart	Nate Piekos	Wilfredo Torres; Marco Rudy (variant)
The; Quantum; Age	#4	November 14, 2018	Jeff Lemire	Wilfredo Torres	Dave Stewart	Nate Piekos	Wilfredo Torres; Brendan McCarthy (variant)
The; Quantum; Age	#5	December 12, 2018	Jeff Lemire	Wilfredo Torres	Dave Stewart	Nate Piekos	Wilfredo Torres; Tula Lotay (variant)
The; Quantum; Age	#6	January 30, 2019	Jeff Lemire	Wilfredo Torres	Dave Stewart	Nate Piekos	Wilfredo Torres; Jeff Lemire (variant)
Black; Hammer	Cthu-Louise	December 12, 2018	Jeff Lemire	Emi Lenox	Dave Stewart	Todd Klein	Emi Lenox; Jill Thompson (variant)
Black; Hammer: Age of Doom	#8	February 27, 2019	Jeff Lemire	Dean Ormston	Dave Stewart	Todd Klein	Dean Ormston; Bill Sienkiewicz (variant)
Black; Hammer: Age of Doom	#9	March 27, 2019	Jeff Lemire	Dean Ormston	Dave Stewart	Todd Klein	Dean Ormston; Sanford Greene (variant)
Black; Hammer: Age of Doom	#10	May 8, 2019	Jeff Lemire	Dean Ormston	Dave Stewart	Todd Klein	Dean Ormston; Michel Fiffe (variant)
Black; Hammer: Age of Doom	#11	July 3, 2019	Jeff Lemire	Dean Ormston	Dave Stewart	Todd Klein	Dean Ormston; Paolo and Joe Rivera (variant)
Black; Hammer: Age of Doom	#12	September 18, 2019	Jeff Lemire	Dean Ormston	Dave Stewart	Todd Klein	Dean Ormston; Paul Pope (variant)
Black; Hammer ’45	#1	March 6, 2019	STORY; Jeff Lemire; STORY & SCRIPT; Ray Fawkes	Matt Kindt	Sharlene Kindt	Marie Enger	Matt & Sharlene Kindt; Veronica Fish (variant)
Black; Hammer ’45	#2	April 3, 2019	STORY; Jeff Lemire; STORY & SCRIPT; Ray Fawkes	Matt Kindt	Sharlene Kindt	Marie Enger	Matt & Sharlene Kindt; Glenn Fabry (variant)
Black; Hammer ’45	#3	May 1, 2019	STORY; Jeff Lemire; STORY & SCRIPT; Ray Fawkes	Matt Kindt	Sharlene Kindt	Marie Enger	Matt & Sharlene Kindt; Denys Cowan, Don Hudson, & Noelle Giddings (variant)
Black; Hammer ’45	#4	June 5, 2019	STORY; Jeff Lemire; STORY & SCRIPT; Ray Fawkes	Matt Kindt	Sharlene Kindt	Marie Enger	Matt & Sharlene Kindt; Sanford Greene (variant)
Black; Hammer	FCBD 2019: Stranger Things / Black Hammer "Horrors to Come"	May 4, 2019	Jeff Lemire; Ray Fawkes	David Rubín			N/A
Black; Hammer	The World of Black Hammer; Encyclopedia	July 3, 2019	Jeff Lemire; Tate Brombal	Various	Dave Stewart	N/A	Andrea Sorrentino
Black; Hammer / Justice League: Hammer of Justice!	#1	July 10, 2019	Jeff Lemire	Michael Walsh		Nate Piekos	Michael Walsh; Jeff Lemire (variant); Yanick Paquette (variant); Yuko Shimizu (variant); Andrea Sorrentino (2 variants); Christian Ward (SDCC 2019 variant)
Black; Hammer / Justice League: Hammer of Justice!	#2	August 14, 2019	Jeff Lemire	Michael Walsh		Nate Piekos	Michael Walsh; Ian Bertram (variant); Matteo Scalera (variant); Jill Thompson (variant); Julián Totino Tedesco (variant)
Black; Hammer / Justice League: Hammer of Justice!	#3	September 11, 2019	Jeff Lemire	Michael Walsh		Nate Piekos	Michael Walsh; Ray Fawkes (variant); Tradd Moore (variant); Nate Powell (variant); Evan Shaner (variant)
Black; Hammer / Justice League: Hammer of Justice!	#4	October 9, 2019	Jeff Lemire	Michael Walsh		Nate Piekos	Michael Walsh; Tyler Crook (variant); Francesco Francavilla (variant); Andrew Robinson (variant); Gabriel Walta (variant)
Black; Hammer / Justice League: Hammer of Justice!	#5	November 13, 2019	Jeff Lemire	Michael Walsh		Nate Piekos	Michael Walsh; Shawn Crystal (variant); Terry Dodson (variant); Sandy Jarrell (variant); Matt Kindt (variant)
Black; Hammer	3 for $1	November 6, 2019	ʀᴇᴘʀɪɴᴛs: Black Hammer #1; Sherlock Frankenstein and the Legion of Evil #1; The Quantum Age #1				David Rubín

Phase II
Series	Issue	Release date	Story	Art	Colors	Letters	Cover
Skulldigger + Skeleton Boy	#1	December 18, 2019	Jeff Lemire	Tonci Zonjic		Steve Wands	Tonci Zonjic; Mike Deodato Jr. (variant); Jeff Lemire (variant)
Skulldigger + Skeleton Boy	#2	January 15, 2020	Jeff Lemire	Tonci Zonjic		Steve Wands	Tonci Zonjic; James Harren (variant)
Skulldigger + Skeleton Boy	#3	February 19, 2020	Jeff Lemire	Tonci Zonjic		Steve Wands	Tonci Zonjic; Patric Reynolds (variant)
Skulldigger + Skeleton Boy	#4	September 23, 2020	Jeff Lemire	Tonci Zonjic		Steve Wands	Tonci Zonjic; Daniel Warren Johnson with Mike Spicer (variant)
Skulldigger + Skeleton Boy	#5	October 21, 2020	Jeff Lemire	Tonci Zonjic		Steve Wands	Tonci Zonjic; Sam Kieth (variant)
Skulldigger + Skeleton Boy	#6	February 24, 2021	Jeff Lemire	Tonci Zonjic		Steve Wands	Tonci Zonjic; Cliff Chiang (variant)
Colonel Weird: Cosmagog	#1	October 28, 2020	Jeff Lemire	Tyler Crook			Tyler Crook; Jeff Lemire with Dave Stewart (variant)
Colonel Weird: Cosmagog	#2	November 25, 2020	Jeff Lemire	Tyler Crook			Tyler Crook; Evan Dorkin with Sarah Dyer (variant)
Colonel Weird: Cosmagog	#3	December 30, 2020	Jeff Lemire	Tyler Crook			Tyler Crook; John McCrea with Mike Spicer (variant)
Colonel Weird: Cosmagog	#4	January 27, 2021	Jeff Lemire	Tyler Crook			Tyler Crook; Malachi Ward (variant)
Barbalien: Red Planet	#1	November 18, 2020	Tate Brombal	Gabriel Hernández Walta	Jordie Bellaire	Aditya Bidikar	Gabriel Hernández Walta; Phil Jimenez with Dave Stewart (variant)
Barbalien: Red Planet	#2	December 16, 2020	Tate Brombal	Gabriel Hernández Walta	Jordie Bellaire	Aditya Bidikar	Gabriel Hernández Walta; Kevin Wada (variant)
Barbalien: Red Planet	#3	January 20, 2021	Tate Brombal	Gabriel Hernández Walta	Jordie Bellaire	Aditya Bidikar	Gabriel Hernández Walta; Aud Koch (variant)
Barbalien: Red Planet	#4	February 17, 2021	Tate Brombal	Gabriel Hernández Walta	Jordie Bellaire	Aditya Bidikar	Gabriel Hernández Walta; Naomi Franquiz (variant)
Barbalien: Red Planet	#5	March 24, 2021	Tate Brombal	Gabriel Hernández Walta	Jordie Bellaire	Aditya Bidikar	Gabriel Hernández Walta; Nick Robles (variant)
Black; Hammer: Visions	#1	February 10, 2021	Patton Oswalt	Dean Kotz	Jason Wordie	Nate Piekos	Dean Kotz with Jason Wordie; Evan Dorkin with Sarah Dyer (variant); Gilbert Hernández with Dave Stewart (variant)
Black; Hammer: Visions	#2	March 10, 2021	Geoff Johns	Scott Kolins	Bill Crabtree	Nate Piekos	Scott Kolins; Kelley Jones with Bill Crabtree (variant); Tom & Sian Mandrake (variant)
Black; Hammer: Visions	#3	April 14, 2021	Chip Zdarsky	Johnnie Christmas	Dave Stewart	Nate Piekos	Chip Zdarsky; Jason Loo (variant); Gerardo Zaffino (variant)
Black; Hammer: Visions	#4	May 12, 2021	Mariko Tamaki	Diego Olortegui	Dave Stewart	Nate Piekos	Diego Olortegui; Christina Chung (variant); Patricia Martin (variant)
Black; Hammer: Visions	#5	June 9, 2021	Kelly Thompson	Leonardo Romero	Jordie Bellaire	Nate Piekos	Leonardo Romero; Annie Wu (variant); Marguerite Sauvage (variant)
Black; Hammer: Visions	#6	July 14, 2021	Cullen Bunn	Malachi Ward & Matthew Sheean	Dave Stewart	Nate Piekos	Malachi Ward & Matthew Sheean; Dan Brereton (variant); Brian Hurtt (variant)
Black; Hammer: Visions	#7	August 18, 2021	Cecil Castellucci	Melissa Duffy	Bill Crabtree	Nate Piekos	Melissa Duffy; Veronica Fish (variant); Yuko Shimizu (variant)
Black; Hammer: Visions	#8	September 22, 2021	Scott Snyder	David Rubín		Nate Piekos	David Rubín; Glenn Fabry with Karen Holloway (variant); Patric Reynolds with Luis NCT (variant)
Black; Hammer: Reborn	#1	June 23, 2021	Jeff Lemire	Caitlin Yarsky	Dave Stewart	Nate Piekos	Caitlin Yarsky; Jeff Lemire with Dave Stewart (variant)
Black; Hammer: Reborn	#2	July 21, 2021	Jeff Lemire	Caitlin Yarsky	Dave Stewart	Nate Piekos	Caitlin Yarsky; Jill Thompson (variant)
Black; Hammer: Reborn	#3	September 1, 2021	Jeff Lemire	Caitlin Yarsky	Dave Stewart	Nate Piekos	Caitlin Yarsky; Fiona Stephenson (variant)
Black; Hammer: Reborn	#4	October 13, 2021	Jeff Lemire	Caitlin Yarsky	Dave Stewart	Nate Piekos	Caitlin Yarsky; Dave Johnson (variant)
Black; Hammer: Reborn	#5	October 27, 2021	Jeff Lemire	Malachi Ward & Matthew Sheean THE CASE OF THE ELECTRIC BOY; Rich Tomasso	Malachi Ward THE CASE OF THE ELECTRIC BOY; Rich Tomasso	Nate Piekos	Caitlin Yarsky; Malachi Ward & Matthew Sheean (variant); Vanesa Del Rey (Tales from the Farm variant)
Black; Hammer: Reborn	#6	November 24, 2021	Jeff Lemire	Malachi Ward & Matthew Sheean THE CASE OF THE ELECTRIC BOY; Rich Tomasso	Malachi Ward THE CASE OF THE ELECTRIC BOY; Rich Tomasso	Nate Piekos	Caitlin Yarsky; Malachi Ward & Matthew Sheean (variants)
Black; Hammer: Reborn	#7	December 29, 2021	Jeff Lemire	Malachi Ward & Matthew Sheean THE CASE OF THE ELECTRIC BOY; Rich Tomasso	Malachi Ward THE CASE OF THE ELECTRIC BOY; Rich Tomasso	Nate Piekos	Caitlin Yarsky; Malachi Ward & Matthew Sheean (variants)
Black; Hammer: Reborn	#8	January 26, 2022	Jeff Lemire	Malachi Ward & Matthew Sheean THE CASE OF THE ELECTRIC BOY; Rich Tomasso	Malachi Ward THE CASE OF THE ELECTRIC BOY; Rich Tomasso	Nate Piekos	Caitlin Yarsky; Malachi Ward & Matthew Sheean (variants)
Black; Hammer: Reborn	#9	February 23, 2022	Jeff Lemire	Caitlin Yarsky	Dave Stewart	Nate Piekos	Caitlin Yarsky; Aaron Conley (variant)
Black; Hammer: Reborn	#10	March 23, 2022	Jeff Lemire	Caitlin Yarsky	Dave Stewart	Nate Piekos	Caitlin Yarsky; Andrea Mutti (variant)
Black; Hammer: Reborn	#11	April 20, 2022	Jeff Lemire	Caitlin Yarsky	Dave Stewart	Nate Piekos	Caitlin Yarsky; Stefano Simeone (variant)
Black; Hammer: Reborn	#12	May 18, 2022	Jeff Lemire	Caitlin Yarsky	Dave Stewart	Nate Piekos	Caitlin Yarsky; Raul Allen (variant)
The; Unbelievable; Unteens	#1	August 11, 2021	Jeff Lemire	Tyler Crook			Tyler Crook; John McCrea (variant)
The; Unbelievable; Unteens	#2	September 8, 2021	Jeff Lemire	Tyler Crook			Tyler Crook; Emi Lenox (variant)
The; Unbelievable; Unteens	#3	October 13, 2021	Jeff Lemire	Tyler Crook			Tyler Crook; Ray Fawkes (variant)
The; Unbelievable; Unteens	#4	November 10, 2021	Jeff Lemire	Tyler Crook			Tyler Crook; Andrea Sorrentino (variant)
Black; Hammer: The End	#1	August 30, 2023	Jeff Lemire	Malachi Ward		Nate Piekos	Malachi Ward; David Rubín (variant)
Black; Hammer: The End	#2	September 27, 2023	Jeff Lemire	Malachi Ward		Nate Piekos	Malachi Ward; Max Fiumara (variant)
Black; Hammer: The End	#3	October 25, 2023	Jeff Lemire	Malachi Ward		Nate Piekos	Malachi Ward; Wilfredo Torres with Bill Crabtree (variant)
Black; Hammer: The End	#4	November 22, 2023	Jeff Lemire	Malachi Ward		Nate Piekos	Malachi Ward; Tonci Zonjic (variant)
Black; Hammer: The End	#5	January 17, 2024	Jeff Lemire	Malachi Ward		Nate Piekos	Malachi Ward; Caitlin Yarsky (variant)
Black; Hammer: The End	#6	March 27, 2024	Jeff Lemire	Malachi Ward		Nate Piekos	Malachi Ward; Tyler Crook (variant)

Phase III
Series	Issue	Release date	Story	Art	Colors	Letters	Cover
Black; Hammer: Spiral City	#1	November 13, 2024	Jeff Lemire	Teddy Kristiansen		Nate Piekos	Teddy Kristiansen; Mike Mignola (variant); Matt Wagner (variant); Duncan Fegredo (variant)
Black; Hammer: Spiral City	#2	December 18, 2024	Jeff Lemire	Teddy Kristiansen		Nate Piekos	Teddy Kristiansen; Jesse Lonergan (variant)
Black; Hammer: Spiral City	#3	January 22, 2025	Jeff Lemire	Teddy Kristiansen		Nate Piekos	Teddy Kristiansen; Dan Orgill (variant)
Black; Hammer: Spiral City	#4	February 26, 2025	Jeff Lemire	Teddy Kristiansen		Nate Piekos	Teddy Kristiansen; Cliff Chiang (variant)
Black; Hammer: Spiral City	#5	April 23, 2025	Jeff Lemire	Teddy Kristiansen		Nate Piekos	Teddy Kristiansen; Tyler Crook (variant)
Black; Hammer: Spiral City	#6	May 28, 2025	Jeff Lemire	Teddy Kristiansen		Nate Piekos	Teddy Kristiansen; Caitlin Yarsky (variant)
Black; Hammer: Spiral City	#7	July 2, 2025	Jeff Lemire	Teddy Kristiansen		Nate Piekos	Teddy Kristiansen; Jan Solheim (variant)
Black; Hammer	FCBD 2025: Critical Role / Black Hammer "To Tomorrow!"	May 3, 2025	Jeff Lemire	Letizia Cadonici	Dave Stewart	Nate Piekos	N/A

Tales from the Farm stories
Series	Chapter	Release date	Story	Art	Colors	Letters
The Last Days of Black Hammer	The Hyperguild War!	January 31 – March 17, 2022	Jeff Lemire	Stefano Simone		Nate Piekos
The Last Days of Black Hammer	Black Hammer No More	March 31 – April 28, 2022	Jeff Lemire	Stefano Simone		Nate Piekos
The Last Days of Black Hammer	Cataclysm Crossover	May 19, 2022 – July 7, 2022	Jeff Lemire	Stefano Simone		Nate Piekos
Colonel Weird and Little Andromeda	Parts 1–4	April 6 – May 5, 2022	Tate Brombal	Ray Fawkes		Steve Wands
Colonel Weird and Little Andromeda	Para-Zoned	May 18, 2022	Tate Brombal	Tyler Bence	Bill Crabtree	Steve Wands
Colonel Weird and Little Andromeda	Martian Mayday	May 25, 2022	Tate Brombal	Shawn Kuruneru	Jordie Bellaire	Steve Wands
Colonel Weird and Little Andromeda	Utopia Born	June 8, 2022	Tate Brombal	Ariela Kristantina		Steve Wands
Colonel Weird and Little Andromeda	Interlude I Willow D. Whisper: Chaotic Investigator	June 15, 2022	Tate Brombal	Dani	Jordie Bellaire	Steve Wands
Colonel Weird and Little Andromeda	Cataclysm	June 22, 2022	Ray Fawkes			Steve Wands
Colonel Weird and Little Andromeda	Para-Zone Island	June 29, 2022	Tate Brombal	Marguerite Sauvage		Steve Wands
Colonel Weird and Little Andromeda	A Girl and her Eyeball	July 6, 2022	Tate Brombal	Andrea Sorrentino	Dave Stewart	Steve Wands
Colonel Weird and Little Andromeda	Cosmic Sheep	July 13, 2022	Tate Brombal	Tyler Crook		Steve Wands
Colonel Weird and Little Andromeda	The End of Eve	July 20, 2022	Tate Brombal	Yuko Shimizu		Steve Wands
Colonel Weird and Little Andromeda	Interlude II; Chasing Chaos	July 27, 2022	Tate Brombal	Dani	Jordie Bellaire	Steve Wands
Colonel Weird and Little Andromeda	Randall's Story	August 3, 2022	Tate Brombal	Nick Robles		Steve Wands
Untitled Black Hammer: Visions story		August 4, 2022	David A. Robertson	Scott B. Henderson		Uncredited
Betwixt, Between		August 24, 2022	Lucy Sullivan			

== Collected editions ==
=== Trade paperbacks ===
Black Hammer trade paperbacks
Title	#	Release date	Material collected	ISBN
Black Hammer: Secret Origins	1	March 29, 2017	Black Hammer #1–6	9781616557867
Black Hammer: The Event	2	December 27, 2017	Black Hammer #7–11, #13	9781506701981
Black Hammer: Age of Doom – Part I	3	January 2, 2019	Black Hammer: Age of Doom #1–5	9781506703893
Black Hammer: Streets of Spiral	—	September 11, 2019	Black Hammer: Giant-Sized Annual; Black Hammer: Cthu-Louise; "Horrors to Come"; The World of Black Hammer Encyclopedia	9781506709413
Black Hammer: Age of Doom – Part II	4	December 18, 2019	Black Hammer: Age of Doom #6–12	9781506708164
Black Hammer: Reborn – Part I	5	February 2, 2022	Black Hammer: Reborn #1–4	9781506714264
Black Hammer: Reborn – Part II	6	June 1, 2022	Black Hammer: Reborn #5–8	9781506715155
Black Hammer: Reborn – Part III	7	October 4, 2022	Black Hammer: Reborn #9–12	9781506720159
The Last Days of Black Hammer	—	February 22, 2023	The Last Days of Black Hammer	9781506731124
Black Hammer: The End	8	June 11, 2024	Black Hammer: The End #1–6	9781506732534
Black Hammer: Spiral City	9	November 18, 2025	Black Hammer: Spiral City #1–7	9781506740775

The World of Black Hammer trade paperbacks
Title	Release date	Material collected	ISBN
Sherlock Frankenstein and the Legion of Evil	May 9, 2018	Black Hammer #12; Sherlock Frankenstein and the Legion of Evil #1–4	9781506705262
Doctor Star and the Kingdom of Lost Tomorrows	November 14, 2018	Doctor Star and the Kingdom of Lost Tomorrows #1–4	9781506706597
Doctor Andromeda and the Kingdom of Lost Tomorrows (revised edition)	April 28, 2021	Doctor Star and the Kingdom of Lost Tomorrows #1–4	9781506723297
The Quantum Age	April 10, 2019	"The Quantum Age"; The Quantum Age #1–6	9781506708416
Black Hammer ’45	October 16, 2019	Black Hammer ’45 #1–4	9781506708508
Colonel Weird: Cosmagog	January 27, 2021	Colonel Weird: Cosmagog #1–4	9781506715162
Barbalien: Red Planet	May 12, 2021	Barbalien: Red Planet #1–5	9781506715803
Skulldigger + Skeleton Boy	June 2, 2021	Skulldigger + Skeleton Boy #1–6	9781506710334
The Unbelievable Unteens	March 9, 2022	"Horrors to Come"; The Unbelievable Unteens #1–4	9781506724362

=== Hardcovers ===
Black Hammer hardcovers
Bʟᴀᴄᴋ Hᴀᴍᴍᴇʀ
Title	Release date	Material collected	ISBN
Black Hammer / Justice League: Hammer of Justice!	March 25, 2020	Black Hammer / Justice League: Hammer of Justice! #1–5	9781506710990
Black Hammer: Visions – Volume 1	October 13, 2021	Black Hammer: Visions #1–4	9781506723266
Black Hammer: Visions – Volume 2	February 2, 2022	Black Hammer: Visions #5–8	9781506725512
Colonel Weird and Little Andromeda	March 22, 2023	Colonel Weird and Little Andromeda	9781506733821

=== Library editions ===
Black Hammer library editions
Volume	Release date	Material collected	ISBN
1	November 28, 2018	Black Hammer #1–13; Black Hammer: Giant-Sized Annual (2017)	9781506710730
2	September 23, 2020	Black Hammer: Age of Doom #1–12; Black Hammer: Cthu-Louise; The World of Black Hammer Encyclopedia	9781506711850
3	October 10, 2023	Black Hammer: Reborn #1–12	9781506725468

The World of Black Hammer library editions
Volume		Release date	Material collected	ISBN
1	Sherlock Frankenstein and the Legion of Evil and Doctor Andromeda and the Kingdom of Lost Tomorrows	October 7, 2020	Black Hammer #12; Sherlock Frankenstein and the Legion of Evil #1–4; Doctor Star and the Kingdom of Lost Tomorrows #1–4	9781506719955
2	Black Hammer ’45 and The Quantum Age	February 23, 2021	Black Hammer ’45 #1–4; "The Quantum Age"; The Quantum Age #1–6	9781506719962
3	Colonel Weird: Cosmagog and Barbalien: Red Planet	June 16, 2021	Colonel Weird: Cosmagog #1–4; Barbalien: Red Planet #1–5	9781506719979
4	Skulldigger + Skeleton Boy and The Unbelievable Unteens	October 26, 2022	Skulldigger + Skeleton Boy #1–6; "Horrors to Come"; The Unbelievable Unteens #1–4	9781506726014
5	Visions	April 12, 2023	Black Hammer: Visions #1–8	9781506732503
6	The Last Days of Black Hammer and Colonel Weird and Little Andromeda	scheduled for September 29, 2026	The Last Days of Black Hammer; Colonel Weird and Little Andromeda	9781506753492

== Awards ==
Award	Year	Category	Nominee	Result
Eisner Awards	2017	Best New Series	Black Hammer; Jeff Lemire & Dean Ormston	Won
Eisner Awards	2017	Best Lettering	Todd Klein	Won
Eisner Awards	2017	Best Writer	Jeff Lemire	Nominated
Eisner Awards	2018	Best Continuing Series	Black Hammer; Jeff Lemire & Dean Ormston	Nominated
Eisner Awards	2018	Best Writer	Jeff Lemire	Nominated
Eisner Awards	2018	Best Penciller/Inker or Penciller/Inker Team	David Rubín	Nominated
Eisner Awards	2018	Best Coloring	David Rubín	Nominated
Eisner Awards	2018	Best Coloring	Dave Stewart	Nominated
Eisner Awards	2019	Best Single Issue/One-Shot	Black Hammer: Cthu-Louise; Jeff Lemire & Emi Lenox	Nominated
Eisner Awards	2019	Best Continuing Series	Black Hammer: Age of Doom; Jeff Lemire, Dean Ormston, & Rich Tommaso	Nominated
Eisner Awards	2019	Best Writer	Jeff Lemire	Nominated
Eisner Awards	2019	Best Lettering	Todd Klein	Won
Eisner Awards	2020	Best Coloring	Dave Stewart	Won
Eisner Awards	2021	Best Limited Series	Barbalien: Red Planet; Jeff Lemire, Tate Brombal, and Gabriel Hernández Walta	Nominated
Eisner Awards	2021	Best Writer	Jeff Lemire	Nominated
Eisner Awards	2021	Best Graphic Album—Reprint	Black Hammer – Volume 2 (library edition); Jeff Lemire, Dean Ormstom, Emi Lenox, and Rich Tommaso	Nominated
Harvey Awards	2018	Book of the Year	Black Hammer: Secret Origins	Nominated
Ringo Awards	2019	Best Series	Black Hammer: Age of Doom	Won
Ringo Awards	2020	Best Series	Black Hammer: Age of Doom	Nominated
Tripwire Awards	2021	Best Collection	Black Hammer – Volume 2 (library edition)	Won
Tripwire Awards	2021	Best Colourist	Dave Stewart	Nominated

== In other media ==
A film and television development was reported to be in development with Legendary Entertainment in November 2018. This deal included not just Black Hammer, but all its associated titles, effectively opening the door to create a cross-platform film and television shared universe. Both Jeff Lemire and Dean Ormston are executive producers, and Lemire will be actively involved in the adaptations. Lemire described his involvement as follows:

"I decided with Black Hammer, because it's so personal and near and dear to my heart, if I was ever going to option and develop it, I had to be intimately involved. As far as that adaptation, I do have to be the one that is creatively steering that ship, like the comic".

Lemire wrote a pilot script for the initial project with Legendary and a series bible, but in April 2021 Legendary Entertainment's option on the series was passed and Lemire was looking a new home for it.
