= Bill Yoshida =

- Self-portrait of Bill Yoshida.
- Born: William Saburo Yoshida; December 1921 U.S.
- Died: February 17, 2005 (aged 83)
- Area: Letterer
- Pseudonyms: Bill Yosh; Saburo Yoshida
- Notable works: Letterer for Archie Comics

William Saburo Yoshida (Japanese: 吉田三郎, December 1921 - February 17, 2005) was a long time letterer for Archie Comics. He was sometimes credited as Bill Yosh or Saburo Yoshida.

Born in the United States in 1921, Yoshida and his family were placed in an internment camp for the Japanese during World War II after the signing of Executive Order 9066. In the post-war years, Yoshida was a guitarist and night club singer who also worked as a chef.

While bowling in an all-Japanese league in New York City, one of his teammates was leading comics letterer Ben Oda. He learned comic book lettering from Oda and was hired in 1965 by Archie Comics, where he averaged 75 pages a week for 40 years for an approximate total of 156,000 pages. He lettered along with many other well-known Archie Comics talents, such as Stan Goldberg, Dan DeCarlo, Samm Schwartz.

He also freelanced on a variety of comic book stories, lettering many pages for Wally Wood and others.

== Awards ==
Yoshida was twice nominated for a Will Eisner Award for Best Lettering, in 1996 and 1999.
