= Kings of Atlantis =

- Genre: Action; Adventure
- Created by: TheAtlanticCraft
- Based on: Atlantis Various Pop Culture movies and series
- Developed by: Tim T. Cunningham
- Written by: Collin Kelly; Jackson Lanzing
- Directed by: Tim T. Cunningham
- Voices of: Cody Owen; Joseph Kenny; Kevin Dean; Larry Brantley; Elizabeth Maxwell
- Country of origin: United States
- Original language: English
- No. of seasons: 1
- No. of episodes: 13

Production
- Executive producers: Jessica Driscoll; Carrye Gilliland Glazar; James E. Tooley; Alex Toumayan; Chris Yates
- Running time: 11 minutes
- Production companies: Omnia Media; Mighty Coconut; YouTube Studio

Original release
- Network: YouTube
- Release: April 7 – May 26, 2017

Kings of Atlantis is an American animation web series produced exclusively for YouTube Premium (then known as YouTube Red) and YouTube Kids, based on and starring Cody Owen and Joseph Kenny, a Minecraft gaming duo known online as TheAtlanticCraft. The series premiered on April 7, 2017, and lasted one season which ended on May 26, 2017.

The 13 episodes series is based on various pop culture movies and series and co-produced by Omnia Media and Mighty Coconut. According to TubeFilter, Kings of Atlantis was the first YouTube Red original series for YouTube Kids.

Each 11-minute episode finds Cody and Joe in an adventure in the city of Atlantis.

== Cast ==
- Cody Owen as Cody
- Joseph Kenny as Joe
- Kevin Dean as Professor Pikalus
- Larry Brantley as Phaeton
- Elizabeth Maxwell as Anemone
- Kelli Bland as Coral
- Brian Coughlin as Alchemor
- Robert Ashker Kraft as King Atlas
- Cameron Hales as Cameron
- Ben Wolfe as The Kraken Kid
- Shannon McCormick as Crabnan the Cabmerian

== Episodes ==
| No. overall | No. in season | Title | Directed by | Written by | Original release date |
|---|---|---|---|---|---|
| 1 | 1 | "Coronation Catastrophe" | Tim T. Cunningham | Collin Kelly and Jackson Lanzing | 7 April 2017 |
On Coronation Day, Cody and Joe are set to become the new Kings of Atlantis when their evil Uncle Phaeton steals their crowns and usurps the throne turning their beloved kingdom into an oppressed and dark place.
| 2 | 2 | "Sneaky Justice" | Tim T. Cunningham | Collin Kelly and Jackson Lanzing | 7 April 2017 |
As King Phaeton continues to run Atlantis into the ground, Cody and Joe work with the Sneaky Sisters to sneak back into the palace to steal their crowns and save their father.
| 3 | 3 | "Night of the Dripping Dead" | Tim T. Cunningham | Collin Kelly and Jackson Lanzing | 7 April 2017 |
When Phaeton turns the entire Atlantis population into a loyal zombie army, Cody and Joe must work to with their mentor Professor Pikalus to create an antidote before it's too late.
| 4 | 4 | "Kraken Kid and The Krazy Krushers" | Tim T. Cunningham | Collin Kelly and Jackson Lanzing | 7 April 2017 |
When dozens of Atlantis' pets are kidnapped for ransom by Kraken Kid, the craziest, baddest outlaw of the sea, they call on Cody and Joe to infiltrate his evil lair and save their friends.
| 5 | 5 | "Crabnan and Crabmerrian" | Tim T. Cunningham | Collin Kelly and Jackson Lanzing | 7 April 2017 |
When Crabnan the Crabmerrian, the finest warrior in the ocean, arrives in the reef, Cody and Joe train in the art of swordplay, deception and handsomeness so they can become better warriors and succeed in their quest to save their kingdom.
| 6 | 6 | "Saving Tides Day" | Tim T. Cunningham | Collin Kelly and Jackson Lanzing | 7 April 2017 |
When Phaeton locks up the citizens of Atlantis so they can not enjoy the beloved Tides Day holiday, Cody, Joe, and the Sneaky Sisters work together to remedy this travesty.
| 7 | 7 | "The Hunter and the Hunted" | Tim T. Cunningham | Collin Kelly and Jackson Lanzing | 14 April 2017 |
After an explosion in Atlantis sends Joe under the city into the catacombs with Captain Lennox, Cody must work to navigate his brother out before it's too late.
| 8 | 8 | "Pikalus Smash!" | Tim T. Cunningham | Collin Kelly and Jackson Lanzing | 21 April 2017 |
When Cody and Joe set up an energy machine that accidentally transforms Professor Pikalus into a monster, they must use science and instinct to make things right with their friend.
| 9 | 9 | "High Reef Drifter" | Tim T. Cunningham | Collin Kelly and Jackson Lanzing | 28 April 2017 |
When Kraken Kid and his Tidal Raiders continually bully a village of innocent Urchins, Cody and Joe teach them how to defend themselves with illusions, pranks, and the element of surprise.
| 10 | 10 | "Unmasked" | Tim T. Cunningham | Collin Kelly and Jackson Lanzing | 5 May 2017 |
When Phaeton hosts a lavish holographic art opening at the palace, Cody, Joe, and the Daughters Merma sneak into the royal affair to take it down with jokes, pranks, and some legit hacking.
| 11 | 11 | "Cody's Cursed!" | Tim T. Cunningham | Collin Kelly and Jackson Lanzing | 12 May 2017 |
Cody is convinced a hermit crab cursed him with the worst head cold ever so he persuades Joe to go on a whirlwind road trip deep into the ocean to locate the culprit and lift the curse.
| 12 | 12 | "Realm of the Titans" | Tim T. Cunningham | Collin Kelly and Jackson Lanzing | 19 May 2017 |
Cody and Joe mischievously create an untested and unsafe portal in order to visit the ancient Titans who they hope can assist them in their quest to defeat Phaeton and save Atlantis.
| 13 | 13 | "Return of the Kings" | Tim T. Cunningham | Collin Kelly and Jackson Lanzing | 26 May 2017 |
When Phaeton summons a Peace Summit in order to take down the leaders of the undersea world, Cody, Joe, The Sneaky Sisters and Professor Pikalus battle it out against a massive army hoping to curb his evil plan before Atlantis is destroyed forever.
