= Ashley A. Woods =

American comic book artist

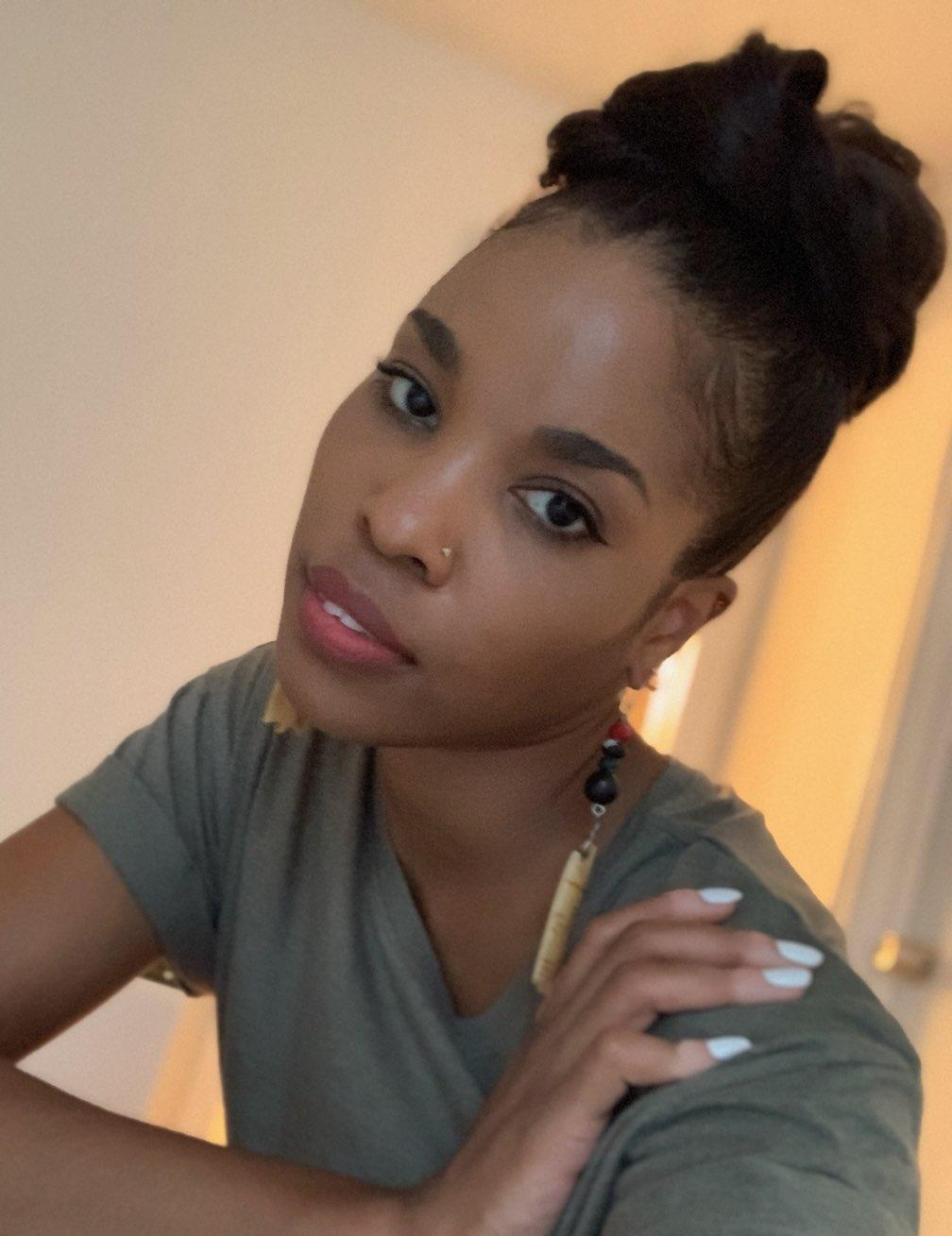
- Born: October 15, 1985 (age 41); Chicago, Illinois
- Occupations: Comic Creator, Illustrator, Storyboard Artist, Creator & Writer
- Website: https://ashleyawoods.com/ https://www.instagram.com/ninjatrip/

Ashley A. Woods (born October 15, 1985) is a comic book artist from Chicago, Illinois, known for her work on the Tomb Raider, Niobe, and Ladycastle series.

== Early life ==
Woods was born and raised in Chicago, Illinois and developed an interest in anime, movies, comics and video games at a young age. Her favorite character was Sailor Moon, along with video games like Final Fantasy, Resident Evil, Pandemonium!, Super Mario World, Sonic the Hedgehog and Mega Man.

She decided to pursue an art education when she was 15 and attended the International Academy of Design and Technology, receiving her degree in Film and Animation in 2007. After graduation, she presented her work in gallery shows across the States and Kyoto University in Kyoto, Japan before deciding to leverage contacts she'd made on the comic-con exhibit circuit and at local gatherings of industry professionals.

=== Career ===
Inspired by blending military and fantasy themes, Woods created, wrote, and fully illustrated her action-fantasy comic, "Millennia War", during her senior year of high school and freshman year of college and self-published the first issue of the series in March 2006. The series currently has seven issues and a graphic novel."

Her breakthrough work came in 2015, when she began working on the series Niobe: She is Life

In 2016, she illustrated the four-issue limited series Ladycastle for Boom! Studios. Published over the first half of 2017, the series brought her popular attention, leading SyFy to call Woods a "breakout artist".

Dark Horse Comics hired Woods to pencil the four-issue limited series Tomb Raider: Survivor's Crusade, published November 2017 through February 2018.

She has since provided cover work for the Image Comics title Bitter Root, Excellence (Skybound & Image Comics), Marvel's Shuri from Black Panther, and interiors for the Viking comic Heathen, with Vault Comics. She then expanded to television and worked on the Jordan Peele and J. J. Abrams-produced TV show, Lovecraft Country, based on the drama/horror novel by writer Matt Ruff. Her work can also be seen in the motion comic Jupiter Invincible with Pulitzer Prize winning author Yusef Komunyakaa which premiered at the Tribeca Film Festival June 2021, Wonder Woman Black & Gold for DC Comics July 2021 and "Red Dirt Witch" January 2026.

== Bibliography ==
- Millennia War #0-6 (Creator, Artist, and Writer) (2006–2009)
- Niobe: She is Life #1-4 with writers Sebastian Jones and Amandla Stenberg (2015–2016)
- Eraathun #2 (Cover) (2016)
- Lady Castle #1-3 with writer Delilah S. Dawson (January - May 2017)
- Tomb Raider: Survivor's Crusade #1-#4 (November 2017 - February 2018)
- Bitter Root (Cover) (2018)
- EXCELLENCE (Cover) (2019)
- MARVEL Action Black Panther #5 (Cover) (2019)
- HEATHEN #9 (Cover) (2019–2020)
- HEATHEN #9-12 (Interiors) (2019–2020)
- Lovecraft Country (TV Show) (2020)
- Jupiter Invincible (Cover & Interiors) (2021)
- Wonder Woman Black & Gold (Interiors) (2021)
- Red Dirt Witch (Cover & Interiors) (2026)
