= Gotham City Garage =

Comic book

Publication information
- Publisher: DC Comics
- Format: Digital
- Publication date: August 2017 - February 2018
- No. of issues: 12

Creative team
- Written by: Collin Kelly and Jackson Lanzing
- Artist(s): Brian Ching, Lynne Yoshii

Gotham City Garage is a digital comic series published by DC Comics, and inspired by a DC collectibles statue line reimagining DC's female heroes as bikers. The series is set in an alternate version of the DC Universe in which Lex Luthor has turned Gotham City into a paradise known as The Garden. Characters include Supergirl, Wonder Woman, Batgirl, Big Barda, and others.

== Background ==
Gotham City Garage is the second comic book series to be spun off from DC Comics' line of collectible statues. DC Bombshells, characters based on 40s-style pin-up heroines, was the first line of collectibles to be turned into a digital comic, and began publishing in 2015. The Gotham City Garage collectibles were launched in 2013, and in 2017 the characters were used to form the basis of a new digital comic series of the same name.

== Collected editions ==
=== English version by DC ===
Title	Material collected	Publication Date	ISBN
Gotham City Garage Volume 1	Gotham City Garage #1-6	2018-06-06	978-1-4012-8019-2
Gotham City Garage Volume 2	Gotham City Garage #7-12	2018-11-07	978-1-4012-8498-5
