= Vault Comics =

American comic book publisher

- Founded: 2016; 10 years ago
- Founder: Adrian Wassel, Damian Wassel, Nathan Gooden
- Country of origin: U.S.
- Headquarters location: Missoula, Montana
- Distribution: Simon & Schuster (books)
- Key people: Adrian Wassel (CCO & Editor-in-Chief); Damian Wassel (CEO & Publisher); Nathan Gooden (Art Director); Damian Wassel, Sr. (President); Tim Daniel (Visual Branding & Design); Ian Baldessari (Office Manager)
- Publication types: Comics
- Fiction genres: Horror, fantasy, science fiction
- Owner: Aethon Books (since 2025)
- Official website: www.vaultcomics.com

Vault Comics is an American publisher of comic books. The company is known for its horror, fantasy, and science fiction titles, with a focus on diversity and cross-media properties.

A private family-owned company, Vault Comics is based in Missoula, Montana.

== History ==
Vault was founded in 2016 by brothers Damian and Adrian Wassel, and their cousin Nathan Gooden. The founders based the company's business model on such publishers as Image Comics and Vertigo Comics.

In 2025, book publisher Aethon Books announced to have purchased majority share of Vault.

== Creators ==
Notable creators associated with Vault include Tim Seeley, Ashley A. Woods, Magdalene Visaggio, Cavan Scott, Donny Cates, Brandon Sanderson, and Jen Bartel.

== Notable titles ==
Titles published by Vault include Vampire: The Masquerade, based on the tabletop role-playing game of the same name. The creative team includes writers Tim Seeley and husband-and-wife duo Blake and Tini Howard, artists Devmalya Pramanik, Nathan Gooden, David W. Mack and Aaron Campbell, colorist Addison Duke, and letterer AndWorld. The comic was nominated for an Eisner Award for Best Lettering of 2021.

Other titles include Dark One, a fantasy graphic novel series created by American author Brandon Sanderson, written by Sanderson, Jackson Lanzing and Collin Kelly with artwork by Nathan C. Gooden. It is the first part of a planned trilogy and the opening volume was published by Vault Comics on May 18, 2021. It is being developed by Sanderson and FremantleMedia North America for a fantasy-drama television series.

The three-issue limited series Reactor (November 2017–April 2018) was written by Donny Cates with art by Dylan Burnett.

Natasha Alterici and Ashley A. Woods' Heathen ran for 12 issues from 2017 to 2020, and is in development as a feature film.

2018 saw the debut of Magdalene Visaggio's six-issue series Vagrant Queen, followed in 2020 by the six-issue series Vagrant Queen: A Planet Called Doom. In 2020, a television series adaptation of Vagrant Queen aired on SyFy (co-produced by Blue Ice Pictures).

Tim Seeley's Money Shot debuted in October 2019 and is still running.

In July 2020, Vault released the magical private eye series Shadow Service, written by Cavan Scott with art by Corin M. Howell. This was Cavan Scott's first creator-owned comic series.

Vault's longest-running title is Wasted Space, which has been published since 2018.

In 2022 Vault began publishing the ongoing series Door to Door Night by Night, written by Cullen Bunn with art by Sally Cantirino. Issue #1 was released in November 2022.

In 2024, Netflix announced an adaptation of the ongoing series Barbaric, written by Michael Moreci with Nathan Gooden as a co-creator and artist. Issue #1 was published in 2021. The live action adaptation of the series is set to star Patrick Stewart and Sam Claflin.

In 2025, Vault announced their Vantage line. This is a line of smaller, more affordable reprints of their more popular comics, similar to DC Compacts or Marvel Premier. They have announced that Witchblood, Money Shot, and These Savage Shores will be released in the compact Vantage editions in December 2025, and that they will be announcing a second wave shortly.

In May 2026, Vault released the first volume of a graphic novel adaptation of the sci-fi novel Dungeon Crawler Carl by Matt Dinniman.

== Awards and nominations ==
Jen Bartel won the 2019 Eisner Award for Best Cover Artist in part for her work on the Vault title Submerged.

The Indian creators Ram V, Sumit Kumar, Vitorio Astone, Aditya Bidikar, and Tim Daniel won the 2020 Ignyte Award for Best Comics Team for their Vault title These Savage Shores.

Vault Comics letterers Jim Campbell and Deron Bennett have been nominated for multiple Eisner Awards.

The Unfinished Corner, by author Dani Colman and illustrator Rachel "Tuna" Petrovicz, was a 2021 National Jewish Book Award finalist, and winner of the VLA Graphic Novel Diversity Award (Youth).
