= Jimmy Gownley =

American comic book writer/artist (born 1972)

- Born: February 5, 1972 (age 54)
- Occupation: Author
- Writing career
- Genre: Graphic novels

Jimmy Gownley (born February 5, 1972) is an American comic book writer/artist best known for his award winning comic book Amelia Rules!. He grew up in the small town of Girardville, Pennsylvania and started to write and draw his own comics at an early age. His first published work was Shades of Gray, which he self-published. Two issues (#0 and #1), self-distributed in an edition of about 100 copies, were published in 1988-89 while the artist was still in high school. Twelve additional issues, starting over with #1 (1993) and titled Shades of Gray Comics and Stories, had national distribution in the low thousands of copies, with color covers and black and white interior art. Gownley called his publishing company Lady Luck, Ltd.

In 1998, Gownley published a Shades of Gray graphic novel, titled Fiction, Part One. Included with the graphic novel was a CD of songs, purportedly written and sung by the characters, actually written by Gownley, and performed by a group of hired musicians. Fiction ends on a cliffhanger, but instead of wrapping up the storyline, Gownley turned to a new set of characters with Amelia Rules.

The first four issues of Shades of Gray were collected in 1995, in a trade paperback titled Days to Remember, and all 12 issues were collected in 2006 in Black and White Life.

Gownley has always had a close circle of admirers, but with the publication of Amelia Rules starting in 2001, he began to receive national recognition, with favorable reviews in Library Journal. Four graphic novel collections of Amelia Rules! were released under Gownley's self-publishing label Renaissance Press, a company he co-founded along with Karen Gownley, and cartoonist Michael Cohen.

The publishing rights to Amelia Rules! were licensed by Simon & Schuster in 2008. The 8-book deal would re-publish the first four Amelia Rules! books and see the release of four new ones.

In May, 2009, Atheneum, an imprint of Simon & Schuster began re-releasing the first four volumes of Amelia Rules!: The Whole World's Crazy, What Makes You Happy, Superheroes, and When The Past Is A Present. They also released a re-packaged version of the holiday story (found in The Whole World's Crazy), entitled A Very Ninja Christmas.

Amelia Rules!: The Tweenage Guide To Not Being Unpopular was released in April 2010. True Things (Adults Don't Want Kids To Know) was released in October 2010. The Meaning of Life ... and Other Stuff became the seventh volume in the Amelia series when it was released in September 2011.

In November 2011 Simon and Schuster announced that the eighth and final Amelia Rules! volume will be called Her Permanent Record, which was eventually released in the following year in September. Upon release in 2012 Her Permanent Record became a New York Times Bestseller, a first for Gownley and the series.

While still producing Amelia Rules! books, Gownley began work on Gracieland, a weekly webstrip featuring the comic exploits of a Catholic School girl and her family. It found immediate favor, receiving favorable reviews on Comics Worth Reading and Comic Book Resources. Gownley produced the strip until 2012.

In February 2014, Gownley released The Dumbest Idea Ever. It was the first of his books to be published under the Scholastic/Graphix imprint. It is also Gownley's first attempt at writing a memoir, and deals with his teen years as a self-publishing comic book artist.

After Dumbest Idea Ever, Gownley turned his attention to writing books for Disney properties, including Tangled and Zootopia. A new original graphic novel under the Scholastic/Graphix imprint, 7 Good Reasons Not to Grow Up, was published in November 2020.

Gownley has traveled across North America talking to students, teachers, and librarians about the creative process and the art of cartooning. He has been an Artist-In-Residence at the Museum of Cartoon Art and The Charles M. Schulz Museum and Research Center.

== Awards ==
The Dumbest Idea Ever! won the Children's Choice book of the Year Award in 2015.

In 2008, Gownley was nominated for four Eisner Awards, the comic book industry's highest honor, which tied him for most nominations by an individual that year. The nominations were for "Best kid's comic", "Best Single Issue" (#18), Best Lettering, Best Coloring.

Gownley has also been nominated for five Harvey Awards in the categories of Best Artist, Best Graphic album reprint, and Best Humor Publication.

Amelia Rules!: Superheroes won the Cybil Award for Best Graphic Novel for ages 12 and under.

In 2008, Gownley was a winner of the Pennsylvania Library Associations One Book Award.

The Tweenage Guide to Not Being Unpopular, True Things (Adults Don't Want Kids to Know) and The Meaning of Life ... and Other Stuff were all named Junior Library Guild selections.
