= Amelia Rules! =

Comic book series

- Cover of Vol. 1
- Author: Jimmy Gownley
- Illustrator: Jimmy Gownley
- Language: English
- Genre: Graphic novel
- Publication place: United States

Amelia Rules! is the title of a comic book series written and drawn by Jimmy Gownley. Amelia Rules! follows the life of Amelia Louise McBride as she adjusts to life in a new town after her parents' divorce causes her to leave life in Manhattan. She is helped along the way by an odd group of friends and her ever-cool aunt, Tanner Clark.

The book has been nominated for 13 Eisner Awards as well as five Harvey Awards. It was also a short list finalist for the Howard E. Day Prize in 2002. In 2007, Amelia Rules! Volume 3: Superheroes won the Cybil Award for best graphic novel for readers twelve and under.

Eight book collections of comic book stories have been published so far: The Whole World's Crazy, What Makes You Happy, Superheroes, When the Past is a Present, The Tweenage Guide to Not Being Unpopular, True Things (Adults Don't Want Kids to Know), The Meaning of Life...and Other Stuff, and Her Permanent Record.

In 2008, Amelia Rules! received four Eisner Nominations, tying Gownley for most nominations by an individual that year. Nominations that year were for "Best Title For A Younger Audience," "Best Single Issue," "Best Coloring," and "Best Lettering". Also in 2008, the Pennsylvania Library Association named Amelia Rules! Volume 4, as one of its "One Book" award winners.

In 2009, Amelia Rules! was nominated for three Harvey Awards: Best Artist (Jimmy Gownley), Best Letterer (Jimmy Gownley) and Best Graphic Album.

In 2012, Her Permanent Record became the first Amelia Rules! book to make the New York Times bestseller list.

The trademark for Amelia Rules! is held by Jimmy Gownley and Karen Applegate-Gownley.

== Books in the series ==
- The Whole World's Crazy
- What Makes You Happy
- Superheroes
- When The Past Is A Present
- The Tweenage Guide To Not Being Unpopular
- True Things (Adults Don't Want Kids To Know)
- The Meaning of Life (and Other Stuff)
- Her Permanent Record
- A Very Ninja Christmas (Reprinting the Christmas story from The Whole World's Crazy plus an origin story),
- Funny Stories (a best of digest sized collection)

== Cast ==
Amelia McBride

Amelia Louise McBride is a 5th-grade spitfire, a whip-smart, wisecracking tomboy who can be surprisingly sweet and giving. Forced out of New York City following her parents' divorce, Amelia takes setbacks in stride—for the most part.

Reggie Grabinsky

Leader and founder of G.A.S.P. (Gathering of Awesome Super Pals), Reggie Grabinsky is a fun-loving, silly guy with a loose grasp on reality. However he can be something that might be considered mature when he needs to.

Rhonda Bleenie

Rhonda Bleenie is a smart, stubborn, and loud girl. She is friends with Amelia because of “geography” and nothing else. She was well known for her hairstyle until she adapted a more down-to-earth look, as well as her unabashed love for Reggie.

Pajamaman

Being the most popular kid in class, being dirt poor, never speaking, and never changing out of his “footie” pajamas requires the magic of this man...Pajamaman. How does he do it? Pajamaman is a loyal friend, a great listener, and cute as a button. Though 'PM' is the shy, silent type, one can always know what he's thinking by checking out the symbol on his jammies.

Tanner Clark

Amelia's Aunt Tanner is a friend, a confidant, and a mentor. She's Amelia's Jiminy Cricket. That is, if Jiminy was a Rock ‘N Roll hipster hottie, instead of, y'know, a bug. She always tells the truth, even when it's difficult. At one time Tanner was a pop rock princess who ruled the charts, but she retired for mysterious reasons and now lives the quiet life in small town PA. But there is always the chance of a big-time comeback tour.

Amelia's mom (Mary McBride) and dad

Typical average parents who are going through a divorce. Amelia's mom, Mary is a bit too overwhelmed to completely connect with her daughter at times but her love for Amelia is evident. She uses care and caution when approaching potentially unsettling moments, like telling Amelia that they are moving (again) and breaking the news that she is going out on a date.

Amelia's dad also loves his daughter unconditionally, but struggles to be an active part of her life, given his infrequent visits and the miles that separate them. A bit depressed from the collapse of his marriage and the dwindling popularity of the company he promotes (he's marketing director for Softee Chicken, a once-popular kids' franchise), he still maintains a semi-cordial relationship with his ex (that is when he doesn't think Amelia is around).

Ninja Kyle

Leader of G.A.S.P.'s arch-rivals, the Park View Terrace Ninjas, Kyle comes off as an arrogant jerk, taking great delight in embarrassing (even humiliating) other kids. But Kyle's jerk-like tendencies may be rooted in something deeper - a genuine affection for Amelia, who reluctantly gets past Kyle's tough exterior, and even agrees to be his “date” to their first school dance. It is difficult to understand how Amelia could ignore Kyle's awful behavior, and it can only be guessed that Kyle's occasional moments of humanity make it difficult for her to remember the worse things he's done. He was injured in a fall at the climax of "True Things" and reappears in "Her Permanent Record" in which he has not completely recovered from his injuries after he broke his leg. He also started to reconnect with Amelia and become friends again after the accident.

Trishia

A friend of both Amelia and Ninja Kyle, Trishia is the writer for all articles in the Tweennie Zeenie (a neighborhood magazine). She writes them all under different pen names except for a story called The Adventures of Princess Trishara. She suffers from a severe case of ventricular septal defect which eventually causes her to move to California to see a specialist in "Superheroes", but she sends Amelia a letter years later to tell her that she survived the operation.

Sunday Jones

Amelia's best friend from her New York days, Sunday is Amelia's equal in terms of spunk and wit.

Ninja Joan Driscoll

Originally known to Amelia only as a member of the rival Park View Terrace Ninjas, Joan became closer friends with Amelia and Rhonda after her father, a Captain in the US Army, was deployed overseas for a year. Joan's tomboy tendencies and a quick wit make her a natural fit in Amelia's small group of friends.

Owen

A minor friend of Amelia. He is mentioned to always smell like cheese. He is also a member of G.A.S.P., although, he doesn't seem to have an alter ego and simply wears homemade bat wings that he believes enables him to fly, which is proven wrong when he attempted to ambush the Park View Terrace Ninjas and fell.

Mary Violet/Ultra Violet

A goth girl who appears to be Catholic and described as a "Cabbage Patch Kid that threw up". In the second volume, she develops a violent personality after a fight with Reggie and joins G.A.S.P. under the alias Ultra Violet.

Earth Dog

Reggie's cousin who enjoys writing poems and is a member of G.A.S.P. as Bear Hugger.

Bug And Iggy

Bullies that torment Reggie. This is temporarily halted after Reggie sneeze-barfed on them. Later, they continue to bully and annoy Reggie by existing.

G.A.S.P.

G.A.S.P. is a superhero group that protects the neighborhood from whatever happens to be bugging leader and founder Reggie Grabinsky, such as Ninjas and the Legion of Steves. Founding members are Reggie (Captain Amazing), Amelia (Princess Powerful), Rhonda (Ms. Miraculous), and Pajama Man (Kid Lightning). New members are Mary Violet (Ultra Violet), Owen (no alter ego), and Earth Dog (Bear Hugger).

Britney, Christina and Jessica

The dominant girls of the school. Every boy's dream and girl's nightmare, the mean group is constantly teasing everyone in school. The posse is led by Britney, whose biting wit can put a comedian to shame. As part of the cheerleaders, these evil triplets are people to look out for.
