= Dark One (graphic novel) =

Fantasy graphic novel series

- The cover for Dark One, volume one.

Publication information
- Publisher: Vault Comics
- Genre: Fantasy
- Publication date: May 2021
- No. of issues: 1

Creative team
- Created by: Brandon Sanderson; Nathan C. Gooden
- Written by: Brandon Sanderson; Jackson Lanzing; Collin Kelly
- Artist: Nathan C. Gooden
- Letterer: Andworld Design
- Colorist: Kurt Michael Russell

Dark One is a fantasy graphic novel series created by American author Brandon Sanderson, written by Sanderson, Jackson Lanzing and Collin Kelly with artwork by Nathan C. Gooden. It is the first part of a planned trilogy and the opening volume was published by Vault Comics on May 18, 2021. It is being developed by Sanderson and FremantleMedia North America for a fantasy-drama television series.

== Development ==
Originally announced as The Dark One, the graphic novel has been in the works since 2013. The story was originally planned as not being connected to his shared fantasy universe the Cosmere, then changed to be part of the Cosmere in 2014, before going back to being its own setting in 2017. It was originally pitched as a television show and novel, though Sanderson opted to go with the graphic novel format: "As I’d paced it, the story didn’t feel like a novel. Not a traditional one, at least. So I began looking for a partnership that would tell the story the way I envisioned." Unlike White Sand, a previous graphic novel series created by Sanderson, Dark One was initially planned to tell its story through the graphic novel medium.

== Plot ==
=== Book one ===
Mirandus is a fantastical wasteland where there is a division between the army of the light and dark. The light devoutly follow "The Narrative," a predestined and unchanging history. On Earth, the 18-year-old Paul Tanasin is drawn into the world of Mirandus at the behest of his sister Nikka, a blue spirit who only he can see and whom he has no memory of. There he meets Feotora, daughter of Mirandus's Chronicle King of the Kingdoms of Light. Paul quickly discovers that he is destined to become the "Dark One", ruler of the drull cultists who have been pushed back and repressed throughout history and backed up by previous Dark Ones. Paul discovers that the cost of killing is that the people he kills will be tied to him as a spirit, or powering the magical sword he uses as a weapon. He decides to become the Dark One after revisiting memories that were removed by an unknown force, wherein he remembered the death of his mysterious father, discovering a portal into Mirandus and having to kill his own sister after she accidentally stepped on a land mine in the fantasy world. As Feotora discovers that the Narrative is actually a false conception stemming from Earth, she kills her father to take control of the Kingdoms of Light's Narrative and defeat the Dark One. However, Paul overwhelms her army and kills the destined Light One. She escapes as Paul makes his new home in the Blackened Lands, but not before he is accidentally teleported back to Earth and falsely accused of murder. Meanwhile, his mother Lin Yang-Tanasin is a lawyer who defends Mr. Caligo, a murderer, but it is revealed that Caligo is actually Malmahan, a previous Dark One. They are teleported to Mirandus in tandem simultaneous to Paul's return to Earth.

== Publication ==
#	Title	Pages	Release date	Hardback ISBN
1	Dark One	224	May 18, 2021	ISBN 978-1939424457

In addition to the graphic novel trilogy, a series of books are planned to further expand the world and storyline of the graphic novels. In addition, audio-original novels and podcasts called Dark One: Forgotten and Dark One: Prophetic Histories. They will be developed by Recorded Books and Mainframe.

== Reception ==
Deanna Destito of Comics Beat said of the first volume: "Lanzing and Kelly deftly transform Sanderson’s plot into an exciting, layered adventure." She added that "Gooden and Russell create a beautiful combination of line art and colors...the whole book is tied together by Bennett’s lettering choices for each character." Destito praised the visuals, saying that they "make a clear distinction between the universes as they exist side-by-side." Joseph Salvatore Knipper of Screen Rant called it "typical for a Sanderson work" and praised the "thought-provoking interpretation of epic fantasy from a villainous point of view."

== Television adaptation ==
In 2018, FremantleMedia North America and Random House Studio were partnering to produce a television series in conjunction with the graphic novels. According to Dante Di Loreto, president of FremantleMedia North America, “The narrative of Dark One will examine the dual roles we often take on in life...this innovative creative partnership with Brandon will serve as a catalyst for deepening the connection between him and his many fans.”
