= Blambot =

American typographer

Blambot is the name of an online type foundry and is the pseudonym of typographer Nate Piekos. Blambot specializes in typefaces for use as lettering in both print and online comics. Blambot has provided lettering and design for major comic book publishers including Marvel Comics, DC Comics, Dark Horse Comics, Image Comics, and Oni Press. Blambot's designs have been licensed for video games, movies, advertising, and product packaging for companies like Microsoft, Cartoon Network, Universal Pictures, Six Flags Amusement Parks, Charles Schulz & Associates, New Yorker Magazine, The Gap, Penguin Random House, and Sony.

Blambot also provides logo design, lettering, and custom typefaces and fonts.
