= Trillium (Vertigo) =

Comic series

Publication information
- Publisher: Vertigo Comics (DC Comics)
- Schedule: monthly
- Format: Limited series
- Publication date: July 2013 – April 2014
- No. of issues: 8

Creative team
- Created by: Jeff Lemire
- Written by: Jeff Lemire
- Artist: Jeff Lemire
- Colorist: José Villarrubia

Trillium is a creator owned 8-issue comic series by Jeff Lemire, published by Vertigo Comics in 2013. Lemire's Sweet Tooth collaborator José Villarrubia is the colorist, while Carlos M. Mangual is the letterer. The story is an inter-dimensional, time traveling love story between two explorers in two different time periods: William Pike, a World War I veteran on an expedition to the lost temples of the Incas in Peru in 1921, and Nika Temsmith, a botanist researching a strange flower on the outer-rim of colonized space in 3797. Separated by thousands of years, William and Nika's budding love threatens the fabric of the universe. Lemire stated that the work of Arthur C. Clarke and Moebius, and contemporary comic series Saga, had a major influence on his story.

Trillium is written and illustrated by Lemire, who is known for his creator owned graphic novels, Lost Dogs, Essex County, The Underwater Welder, and comic book series, Sweet Tooth. Trillium is his third title with Vertigo.

== Eisner Awards ==
Trillium received an Eisner Award nomination in 2014 for Best Limited Series.

== Collected editions ==
Title	Material collected	Publication date	ISBN
Trillium	Trillium #1-8	August 2014	9781401249007
