= The Nobody =

2009 graphic novel by Jeff Lemire

- Date: 2009
- Page count: 144 pages
- Publisher: Vertigo

Creative team
- Writers: Jeff Lemire
- Artists: Jeff Lemire
- Pencillers: Jeff Lemire
- Letterers: Sean Konot
- Colourists: Jeff Lemire

Original publication
- Date of publication: July 7, 2009
- ISBN: 1401220800

The Nobody is a graphic novel created by cartoonist Jeff Lemire. It was first published in a hardcover format by Vertigo Comics in July 2009. It is a retelling of the 1897 H.G. Wells novel The Invisible Man, recasting the bandaged stranger as a modern-day drifter. His presence in a small-town American fishing village creates a frenzy that unwraps and exposes the scarred underside to their own secrets. Lemire believed Wells' character was an ideal way to "explore themes of identity, rural life, community and paranoia".

== Synopsis ==
In 1994, the mysterious drifter John Griffen enters the small town of Large Mouth. As he walks through town, the passing townsfolk are shocked and somewhat disturbed by Griffen's appearance, as he is wrapped head to toe in bandages and wears pitch-black goggles over his eyes. He eventually reaches the local motel and requests a room, his appearance scaring the inn keeper June Jaques.

A few days later, June tells other locals at Big Reg's Diner of her encounter with Griffen, but is only met with skepticism. Reg, owner of the diner, and Teddy "Henfrey", another local, try to reason with her that Griffen can't be as bad as she claims, although she tries to explain that his secretive nature is very suspicious.

== Characters ==
- John Griffen: The main protagonist, he resembles the title character of The Invisible Man by H.G. Wells. Griffen is a mysterious scientist who claims that he was once a university professor in Chicago before suffering an accident, although many of the townsfolks believe he is not who he claims.
- Victoria "Vickie": The narrator of the story and only friend of John Griffen.
- "Reg" Reggie: Vickie's father and owner of the local diner Big Reg's who is one of few people who is sympathetic towards Griffen.
- Mrs. June Jacques: Keeper of the motel where Griffen stays.
- Teddy "Henfrey": A paranoid old man who is highly suspicious of Griffen and often tries to convince the townsfolk that Griffen is hiding something they don't want to see.
- Bill: Bartender at King's Tavern who is suspicious of Griffen.
- "Millie" Jeffers: A waitress at King's Tavern who later goes missing.
- Jack "Jeffers": Millie's husband
- Mr. Tommy Marvel: An old man by the lake and owner of Howie. Griffen meets Marvel by the lake while on a late night stroll and the two strike up a friendly conversation with each other until Marvel's dog attacks Griffen, prompting him to flee.
- Howie: Tommy Marvel's dog who attacks Griffen.
- Deputy Ayde: A lawman who ignores Teddy's outrageous claims against John Griffen.
- John "Kemp": Griffen's partner in Chicago and a minor antagonist of the story.
- "HER": The lady in Griffen's visions.
- Anna: Vickie's alibi friend who she uses as an excuse to see Griffen.

== Reception ==
In a review for Oregon Live, Steve Duin said there was a "lot to like" about The Nobody, but that it was not as good as Lemire's previous work, Essex County.
