= Descender (comics) =

Comic book by Jeff Lemire and Dustin Nguyen

- Cover to Descender #1

Publication information
- Publisher: Image Comics
- Schedule: Monthly
- Format: Limited Series
- Genre: Science fiction
- Publication date: Descender: March 4, 2015 – July 25, 2018; Ascender: April 24, 2019 – August 18, 2021
- No. of issues: 32 (Descender); 18 (Ascender)

Creative team
- Created by: Jeff Lemire; Dustin Nguyen
- Written by: Jeff Lemire
- Artist: Dustin Nguyen
- Letterer: Steve Wands

Collected editions
- Descender Vol 1: Tin Stars: ISBN 9781632154262
- Descender Vol 2: Machine Moon: ISBN 9781632156761
- Descender Vol 3: Singularities: ISBN 9781632158789
- Descender Vol 4: Orbital Mechanics: ISBN 9781534301931
- Descender Vol 5: Rise of the Robots: ISBN 9781534303454
- Descender Vol 6: The Machine War: ISBN 9781534306905
- Ascender Vol. 1: The Haunted Galaxy: ISBN 9781534313484
- Ascender Vol. 2: The Dead Sea: ISBN 9781534315938
- Ascender Vol. 3: The Digital Mage: ISBN 9781534317260
- Ascender Vol. 4: Star Seed: ISBN 9781534319226

Descender is a science fiction space opera comic book series written by Jeff Lemire and illustrated by Dustin Nguyen. The series was published by Image Comics. The story follows a young android, TIM-21, trying to survive endless bounty hunters in a universe that has outlawed all robotics and artificial intelligence.

The first issue of the series was released on March 4, 2015, and received critical acclaim for Lemire's writing as well as for Nguyen's artwork, with the latter winning an Eisner Award for his artwork on the series. Descender ran for a total of 32 issues, with the final issue of the series released on July 25, 2018. A sequel series, titled Ascender, taking place ten years after the events of Descender was announced in 2018. The first issue was published on April 24, 2019, by Image Comics.

In January 2015, it was announced that Sony Pictures had acquired the film rights to the series with the intention of creating a feature film adaptation. In June, 2020, Canada's Lark Productions, a subsidiary of NBCUniversal, announced that they had acquired the exclusive television rights to the series.

== Plot summary ==
Ten years in the past, planet-sized robots appeared out of nowhere. They began to wreak havoc throughout the galaxy, demolishing entire worlds before suddenly disappearing as quickly as they arrived. After the destruction caused by these the "harvesters", as they are nicknamed by The United Galactic Council, anti-robot fanaticism spreads throughout the council's nine-core planets, resulting in the culling of all artificial intelligence and robotic life in the galaxy. Ten years after the carnage, a young android named TIM-21 wakes up to discover that he is not only one of the last robots in existence, but also the most wanted being in the universe. Pursuing him are the inimitable Captain Telsa, daughter of the U.G.C.'s president and survivor of the harvester attacks, and Doctor Quon, the disgraced and secretive "father of robotics". Alongside his robot dog, Bandit, and a maladroit mining droid named Driller, TIM-21 embarks on a cosmic odyssey that has him facing bounty hunters and threats at every turn.

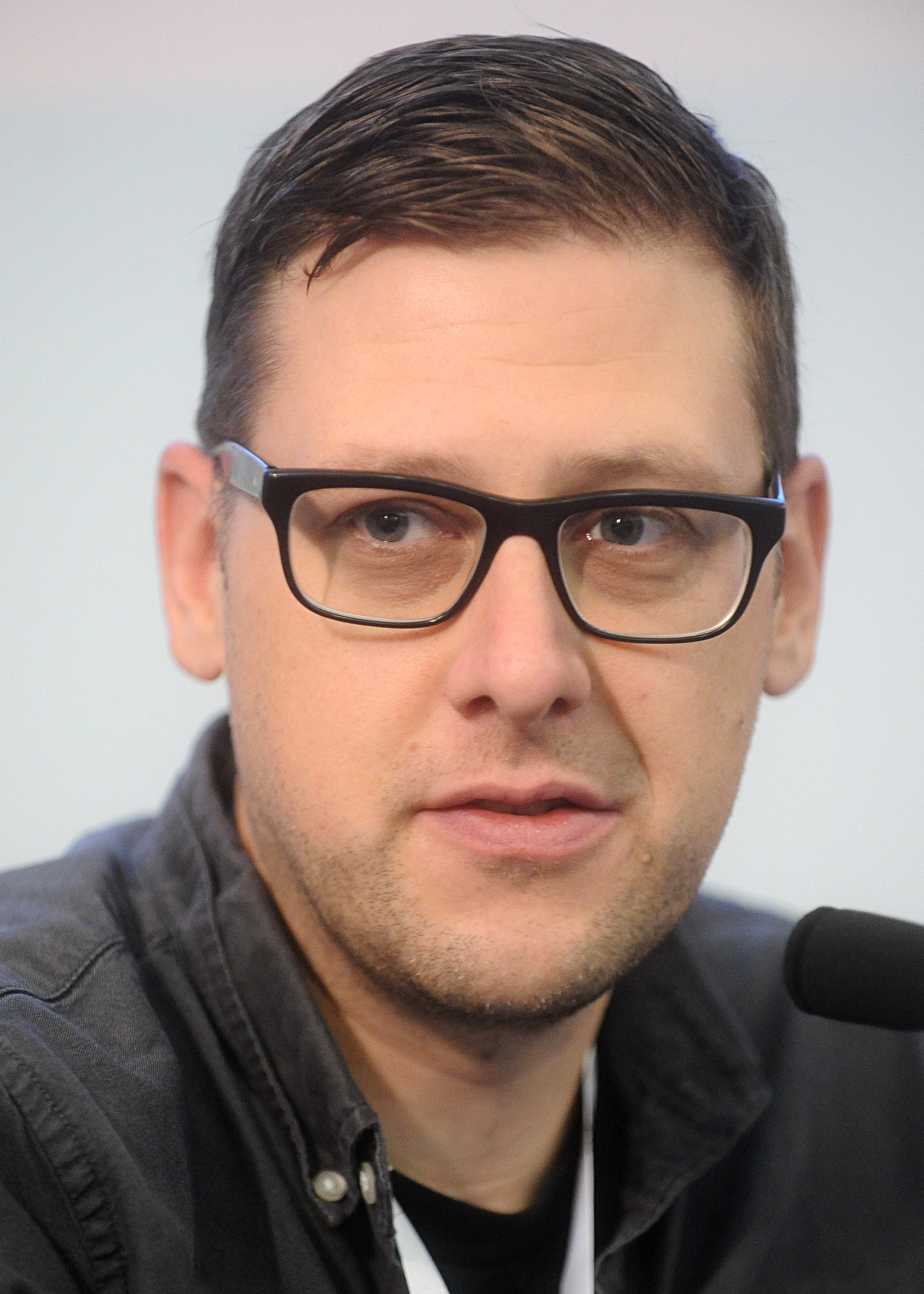
Descender co-creator and writer Jeff Lemire

== Background and Critical Reception ==
Lemire's work is often heavily influenced by his personal life. The Essex County Trilogy, for instance, is based on the area of Ontario, Canada where Lemire grew up. Descender also pulls from the writer's personal life, notably becoming a father, as Lemire has stated that the series is "more about my fears for my son and me wanting to protect his perspective about the world." Like much of Lemire's other work, Descender makes use of a child protagonist in order to tackle a variety of intimate topics such as alienation, grief, mental illness and othering, a narrative tactic that Lemire frequently utilizes because "kids feel everything so intensively." Lemire's notable minimal style is utilized throughout Descender. For instance, many comic writers make use of "thought balloons", meant to indicate the internal thoughts of a character. Lemire, however, frequently chooses to omit this aspect of his work, instead utilizing only balloons to indicate speech. As Lemire puts it: "I try not to overwrite. I try to only say what needs to be said and let the images tell all the rest." The series is also unique in that it is Lemire's first ongoing, creator-owned project that he has not illustrated. Descender was critically acclaimed upon its release. In 2016, Dustin Nguyen won an Eisner Award for "Best Painter/Multimedia Artist" for his work on Descender.

== Television Adaptation ==
In January, 2015, Sony Pictures acquired the movies rights to Descender after a competitive bidding war, two months before the publication of the first issue of the series. That same month, it was announced that both Lemire and Nguyen would serve as executive producers. In June, 2020, Lark Productions, a branch of NBCUniversal, announced that they had acquired the exclusive television rights to Descender, with Lemire and Nguyen still attached as producers.

== Sequel Series ==
In 2019, Lemire and Nguyen announced they would be re-teaming to work on a direct sequel series, called Ascender, set ten years after the conclusion of Descender. The new story features Mila, daughter of two characters from Descender, Andy and Effie and is set on a world where magic has almost completely replaced machines. The final issue of the series had a standard cover titled Ascender #18, and a variant cover titled Descender #50.
