= Jeff Lemire =

Canadian cartoonist, comic book writer, and artist (born 1976)

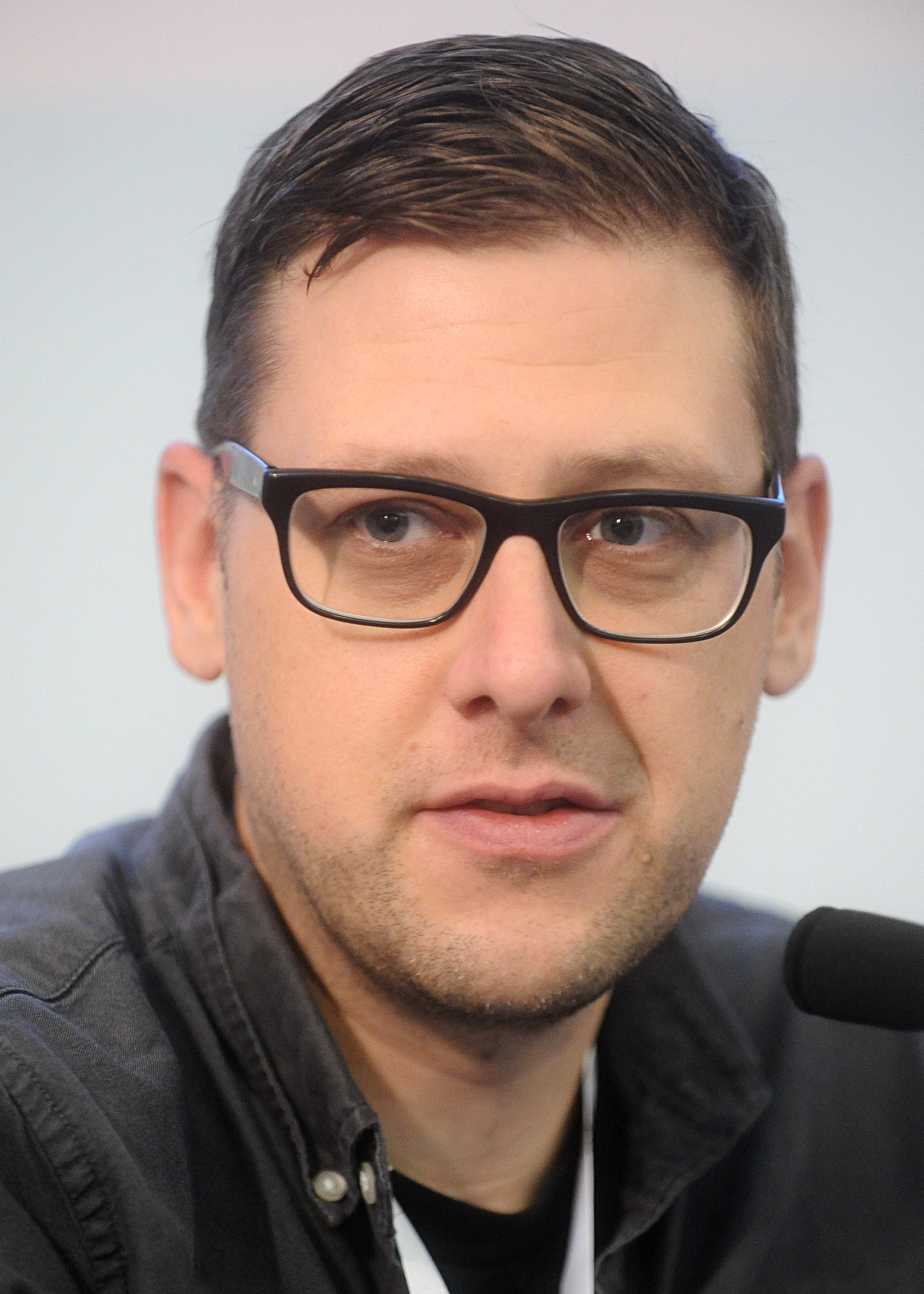
- Lemire at Lucca Comics & Games 2017
- Born: March 21, 1976 (age 50) Essex County, Ontario, Canada
- Areas: Cartoonist, Writer, Penciller
- Notable works: Sweet Tooth; Essex County Trilogy; Green Arrow; Animal Man; Black Hammer; Gideon Falls; Descender; Absolute Flash
- Awards: Xeric Award, 2005; YALSA Alex Award, 2008; Joe Shuster Award, 2008; Doug Wright Award, 2008; Joe Shuster Award, 2013; Eisner Award, 2017; YALSA Alex Award, 2018; Eisner Award, 2019; Eisner Award, 2022

Jeff Lemire (/ləˈmɪr/; born March 21, 1976) is a Canadian comic book writer, artist, cartoonist, and television producer. He is the author of critically acclaimed titles including the Essex County Trilogy, Sweet Tooth, and The Nobody. His written work includes All-New Hawkeye, Extraordinary X-Men, Moon Knight and Old Man Logan for Marvel; Superboy, Animal Man, Justice League Dark, Green Arrow and Absolute Flash for DC; Black Hammer and Mazebook for Dark Horse; Descender and Gideon Falls for Image Comics; and Bloodshot Reborn for Valiant.

In 2021, Sweet Tooth was adapted as a Netflix television series through Susan and Robert Downey Jr.'s production company Team Downey, with Lemire serving as an on-set consultant.

Lemire has also collaborated with musicians such as Eddie Vedder on his Matter of Time animated video and Gord Downie on Secret Path, a multimedia storytelling project.

== Early life ==
Lemire was born and raised in Woodslee, Ontario in Essex County, near Lake St. Clair. Lemire attended film school, but decided to pursue comics when he realized that filmmaking did not suit his solitary personality.

== Career ==
=== 2000s ===
==== Early work ====
After self-publishing the Xeric Award-winning comic book Lost Dogs in 2005 via his Ashtray Press imprint, Lemire was employed at Top Shelf Productions. While beginning his comics career, Lemire worked as a line cook in restaurants to support himself. He continued working in kitchens even after Essex County began to be published by Top Shelf Productions, as the books initially did not provide enough income for him to live on. He had originally expected to continue working in kitchens while making comics as a personal passion, rather than as a full-time career.

Lemire serialized a science-fiction strip called Fortress in the quarterly UR Magazine.

In 2006 Lemire's work was included in an international symposium gathering artists, scholars, curators, publishers, librarians, critics, and writers at the Banff Centre. Lemire's work was part of the "Comic Craze" exhibit, which showcased Canadian comics and narrative fiction.

==== Essex County ====
Lemire wrote and illustrated the Eisner and Harvey Award-nominated Essex County Trilogy for Top Shelf in 2008–2009.

In June 2011 it was announced that visual effects artist John Dykstra would direct an adaptation of Essex County entitled Super Zero.

2012 saw the publication of a new graphic novel from Top Shelf called The Underwater Welder, which was released to critical acclaim.

In December 2015, it was announced that First Generation Films had optioned the rights to Essex County to develop the graphic novel as a television series from Canada's CBC. Aaron Martin was set as writer and showrunner, as well as executive producing with Lemire.

In October 2020, Lemire revealed that the show will commence filming in 2022 as a six-episode mini-series with himself serving as writer, showrunner, and producer. The series, Essex County, premiered on March 19, 2023, on CBC Television.

==== The Nobody ====
In 2009, DC Comics' Vertigo imprint published Lemire's The Nobody, a two-colour tale of identity, fear and paranoia in a small community.

==== Sweet Tooth ====
Lemire wrote and illustrated the full-colour Vertigo series Sweet Tooth, published September 2009 to January 2013.

In May 2020, Netflix confirmed the release of the movie adaptation of Sweet Tooth as a series of eight episodes. Susan and Robert Downey Jr. take part in the project through their production company Team Downey. While on set during the filming of the pilot in New Zealand, Lemire was hit with an inspiration for how to revisit the world of Sweet Tooth in comics, which led to the 2020 six-issue miniseries Sweet Tooth: The Return.

=== 2010s ===
==== DC Comics ====
Lemire signed an exclusivity contract with DC Comics in December 2010. He moved over to the DC Universe to write the one-shot Brightest Day: Atom, with Turkish artist Mahmud Asrar, designed to act as a springboard for an Atom story to co-feature in Adventure Comics. He also relaunched the Superboy series featuring the character Conner Kent. During Flashpoint he wrote Frankenstein and the Creatures of the Unknown miniseries, then, as part of The New 52, he wrote the ongoing series Animal Man and Frankenstein, Agent of S.H.A.D.E..

Further into the launch of The New 52, Lemire took over the writing duties on Justice League Dark with issue #9, while leaving Frankenstein: Agent of S.H.A.D.E. to newcomer Matt Kindt. He continued to write Animal Man into 2012, including teaming up with Swamp Thing writer Scott Snyder for a crossover between the two books called "Rotworld." In February 2013, Lemire replaced Ann Nocenti as the writer of Green Arrow. His work on the title, which had not been well-received under previous writers, was widely praised by critics and fans, and lasted until September 2014.

Lemire drew a Rip Hunter story for Time Warp #1 (May 2013) which was written by Damon Lindelof and published by Vertigo.

In 2014, Lemire joined a team of writers composed of Brian Azzarello, Keith Giffen, and Dan Jurgens to co-write The New 52: Futures End, a new weekly series set five years into the New 52's future. It ran from May 2014 through April 2015.

Lemire wrote Teen Titans: Earth One, an original graphic novel with art by Terry and Rachel Dodson published by DC Comics in November 2014. As part of DC's Earth One line, Teen Titans: Earth One takes place in an alternate continuity-free universe that re-imagines DC's characters.

He is currently the head writer for Absolute Flash with the head artist being Nick Robles.

==== Marvel Comics ====
After his exclusivity contract with DC came to an end, Lemire began working with other publishers. At the 2014 New York Comic Con, it was announced that Lemire would be writing All-New Hawkeye, his first Marvel Comics title, with artist Ramón Pérez, which began in March 2015, a follow-up to Matt Fraction's and David Aja's acclaimed run. The series ran for five issues until September 2015 before being relaunched as part of All-New All-Different Marvel.

Bleedingcool reported in April 2015 that Lemire had signed an exclusivity contract with Marvel, which excluded his creator-owned work with Image and Dark Horse Comics, as well as his work with Valiant Entertainment.

In June 2015, Lemire was announced as a writer for three titles in the All-New, All-Different Marvel branding: All-New Hawkeye, with artist Ramón Pérez, Extraordinary X-Men, with artist Humberto Ramos, and Old Man Logan, with artist Andrea Sorrentino. Three months later, it was announced he would pen the relaunched Moon Knight title, with artist Greg Smallwood. His work on the character served as inspiration for the 2022 Disney+ television series adaptation. Series directors Justin Benson and Aaron Moorhead said of the Lemire/Smallwood run's influence:

"When we got together [...] and we cracked open that run in particular, that was when the visuals of the show really crystallized for us [...] The highly formal composition, the bright colors — there's actually a sense of match cutting, so it even informed our editing a little bit. The blending of realities and all of that, that was a big, big part of it. That's why we just obsessed over that run."

— Aaron Moorhead

"There's obviously a pretty big focus on human emotion in that run in ways that are not kinetic on the page [...] That's why we respected it even more. It's so hard to just have two people in a panel just having an emotional moment, but that was obviously a big inspiration for the show."

— Justin Benson

Extraordinary X-Men, billed as the flagship X-Men title, features a team led by Storm, deals with the fallout of the Terrigen Mist, and launched in November 2015. All-New Hawkeye debuted in November 2015, continuing with the story-line established in Lemire's and Pérez's previous run on the title. Old Man Logan launched in January 2016, and features a future version of Wolverine.

==== Valiant Entertainment ====
In December 2014, Lemire launched The Valiant, a four-issue limited series, featuring characters from all over the Valiant line, co-written with Matt Kindt with art by Paolo Rivera. His first work for Valiant Comics, the series sets the stage for the Valiant Universe moving forward.

Spinning out of The Valiant, Lemire began writing the ongoing series Bloodshot Reborn alongside artist Mico Suayan, with the first issue being released in April 2015. The series features Bloodshot, a character Lemire approached by distilling the issues he had him and twisting the prototypical action hero into a more emotionally-driven story. The second story arc, starting with issue 6 in September, featured art by Butch Guice. The third arc, debuting with issue 10 in January 2016, began publishing in the Valiant Prestige format, with art by Lewis LaRosa.

==== Descender ====
In March 2015, Lemire launched Descender, a creator-owned science fiction series with art by Dustin Nguyen, from Image Comics. Announced on San Diego Comic-Con 2014, the ongoing series follows a robot named Tim-21 through his adventures in space. The series is Lemire's first creator-owned ongoing series not illustrated by himself. Descender ran thirty-two issues from March 2015 to July 2018. A sequel series, Ascender, set ten years after the original series, launched April 2019.

In January 2015, Sony Pictures acquired the movie rights to Descender after a competitive bidding war. Josh Bratman is producing, with Lemire and Nguyen serving as executive producers. Jesse Wigutow, writer of the Tron: Legacy sequel, was announced as the screenwriter adapting Descender in February 2016.

==== The World of Black Hammer ====
In July 2014, Dark Horse Comics announced a new creator-owned superhero series written by Lemire with art by Dean Ormston, titled Black Hammer, set to be released in March 2015. However, in April 2015, Lemire stated that the series had been delayed indefinitely due to a cerebral hemorrhage suffered by Ormston. In February 2016 it was announced that the series would be launching on July of that same year. In 2017 it won the Eisner award for Best New Series.

In 2017, Jeff Lemire launched The World of Black Hammer, a series of Black Hammer spinoff titles.

In 2018, the title was optioned as a "multiplatform franchise" by Legendary Entertainment, with television and film adaptations in the works.

==== Plutona ====
Plutona, a five-issue limited series from Image Comics co-written with artist Emi Lenox, was released in September 2015 to critical acclaim. Announced at Image Expo 2015, the series follows a group of kids who find the body of a dead superhero in the woods, and features colors by Jordie Bellaire. Lemire will be drawing backup stories featuring the last adventures of Plutona.

==== Roughneck and AD: After Death ====
In September 2013, Simon & Schuster acquired world rights to Lemire's newest graphic novel, Roughneck, for publication in 2016. The graphic novel, which Lemire wrote, illustrated, and painted, follows a former hockey player's slide into depression as interrupted by the arrival of his sister, and was scheduled to be published in October 2016. Comparing the project to Essex County, a book that found success in the mainstream literary world, Lemire stated that he chose Simon & Schuster because he wanted to find a publisher that would treat Roughneck as a novel instead of a comic, with his goal being finding success outside of the direct market.

AD: After Death, a graphic novel written by Scott Snyder and illustrated by Lemire, was announced at Image Expo 2015 for release on November of that same year.

==== Secret Path ====
In 2016, Lemire collaborated with musician Gord Downie on Secret Path, a graphic novel accompaniment to Downie's solo album of the same name.

==== Royal City ====
In March 2017, Lemire released a new ongoing series titled Royal City through Image Comics. He is the sole writer and illustrator. The series follows Royal City resident the Pike family, who live with the ghost of the young Tommy Pike, who "is quite literally haunting them all still and holding them all back." Lemire originally intended the series to be much longer. He later said of the series' premature ending:

Of all the books I have done, this one feels like a failure of sorts. I had huge ambitions for the Royal City series. I wanted it to be a place where I could tell all sorts of stories and a place that I could return to throughout my career, and check in on the characters at different points in their lives. But the truth is, the schedule of trying to write, draw and watercolor paint a monthly comic myself, while also writing all my other series for other artists, was just too much. I can do a lot, but doing that really pushed me to exhaustion and I had to wrap up Royal City sooner than I wanted just to keep my sanity.

Royal City continued in Fall 2023.

==== Sentient ====
In October 2019, TKO Studios released Sentient as both a six-issue miniseries and an original graphic novel. Written by Jeff Lemire with art by Gabriel Hernández Walta, Sentient was nominated for the Eisner Award for Best Limited Series in 2020.

=== 2020s ===
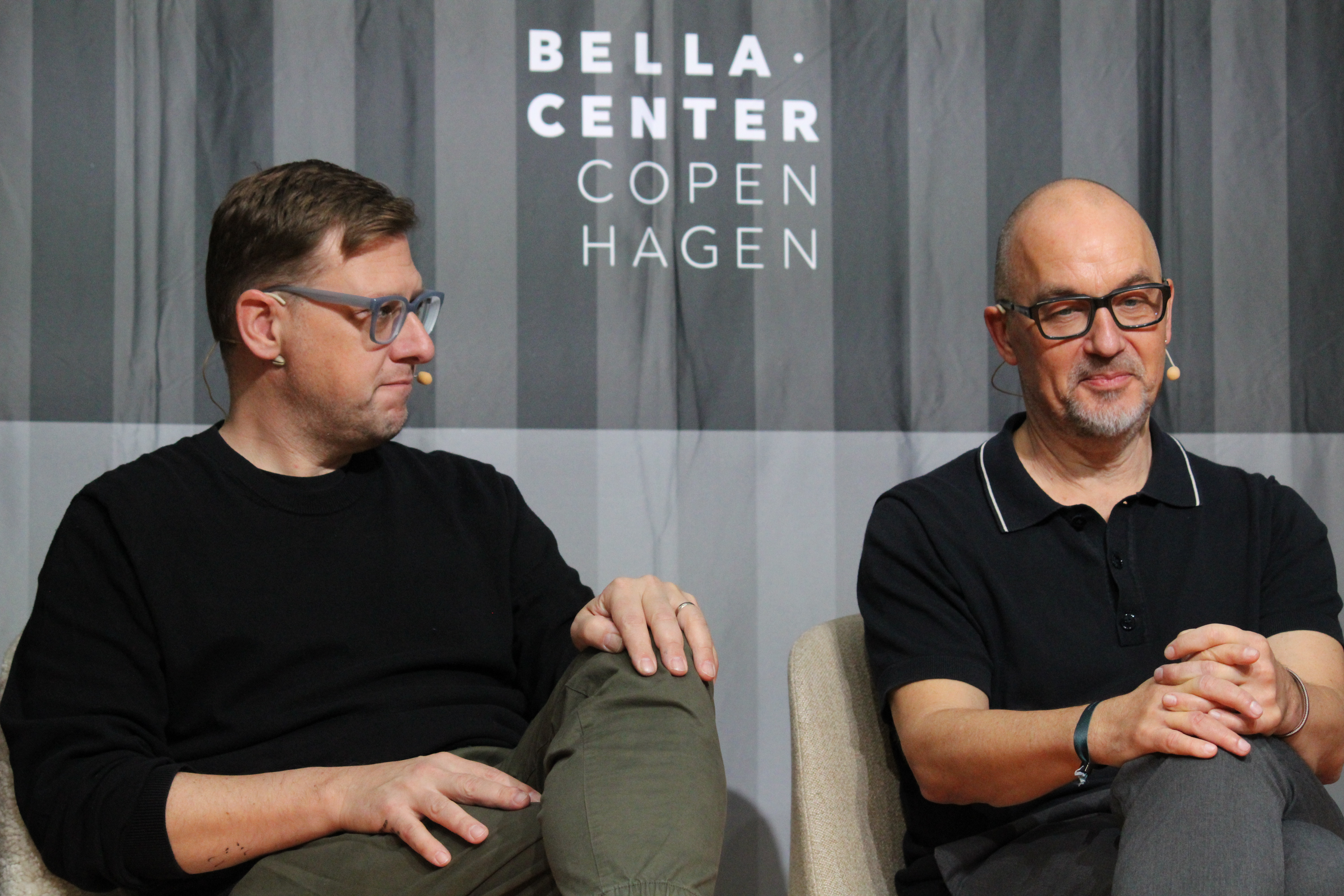
Lemire with Teddy Kristiansen at Bogforum 2025 in Copenhagen

In 2022, Lemire announced he had signed an exclusive deal with Image Comics, with an exclusion clause for his work on Black Hammer with Dark Horse Comics.

==== Snow Angels ====
On February 16, 2021, writer Jeff Lemire and artist Jock's Snow Angels launched as a comiXology Original. It is a ten-issue limited series divided into two miniseries of four and six issues respectively. Additionally, a prose short story written by Lemire was released on Amazon's Kindle and Audible to tie in with the comic's release. The series was republished in trade paperback form by Dark Horse Comics in 2022. The series won the Best Digital Comic Eisner Award in 2022.

==== Mazebook ====
Lemire originally announced this series in his newsletter, Tales from the Farm, in January 2021 before the official announcement the following June. It is a five-issue monthly miniseries, published by Dark Horse Comics. Written and drawn by Lemire, the story follows a man looking for his daughter ten years after she originally went missing. The first issue was published September 8, 2021.

==== Tales from the Farm newsletter ====
In early September 2021, Lemire announced his Tales from the Farm email newsletter would be moving to Substack, where he would be serializing a new story, Fishflies. It began September 10, with Lemire projecting the series to run about five hundred pages, with each update being around five pages long.

In addition to the World of Black Hammer stories published with Dark Horse Comics, Lemire will be debuting new stories through his Tales from the Farm newsletter. Several are already in the works.

==== Primordial ====
This was initially announced as collaboration with illustrator Andrea Sorentino codenamed "Project Bark". It was published as a six-issue miniseries by Image Comics beginning on September 15, 2021.

==== The Bone Orchard Mythos ====
In his Tales from the Farm newsletter, Lemire has said he and Sorrentino are already at work on their next project after Primordial, teasing an announcement to coming in the Fall of 2021. Lemire claimed it will be "the most ambitious thing he and I have done together." In November 2021, Lemire announced the project as The Bone Orchard Mythos, a "shared horror universe of interconnected stories taking place across multiple books and in different formats" from him and Sorrentino at Image Comics. The first three books will be a graphic novel in June 2022 called The Passageway, a mini-series in Fall 2022 called Ten Thousand Black Feathers, and another hardcover graphic novel in mid-2023 called Tenement, with a Free Comic Book Day prelude issue debuting in May 2022.

==== Cosmic Detective ====
In May 2020, Jeff Lemire and Matt Kindt announced the opening of a Kickstarter crowdfunding campaign for a graphic novel entitled Cosmic Detective, for which they will be writers with David Rubín on board as artist. The book was completed in November 2021, with the digital edition releasing in December 2021 and the physical edition was released in summer of 2022.

==== Little Monsters ====
Lemire announced plans to re-team with Descender and Ascender illustrator Dustin Nguyen for a project initially known under the working title of Project Pavement. The project's name was eventually revealed to be Little Monsters, an ongoing series at Image Comics, and the first issue came out in March 2022.

==== Phantom Road ====
Originally announced under the codenames "Project Jackknife" and "Project Headlights," Phantom Road is a collaboration with artist and co-creator Gabriel Hernández Walta, colorist Jordie Bellaire, and letterer Steve Wands, which Lemire calls "ambitious" and a "longer story" with at least three different story arcs, currently planned for a November 2022 release. Phantom Road was formally announced December 22, 2022, as an ongoing horror series described by the publisher as "Mad Max: Fury Road meets The Sandman", which will follow Birdie, a young woman from a car crash, and Dom, a truck driver, on a nightmarish road trip. Lemire said he wanted to do something with the scope of Preacher, The Sandman, and The Walking Dead.

== Awards ==
Lemire won a Xeric Award in 2005 for his book Lost Dogs. He was a 2008 recipient of a Young Adult Library Services Association Alex Award for Essex County Volume 1: Tales from the Farm. Lemire received a Joe Shuster Canadian Comic Book Creator Award for Outstanding Cartoonist in 2008, and the Doug Wright Award for Best Emerging Talent in 2008. 2013 saw Lemire win another Joe Shuster Award for Outstanding Cartoonist (recognizing his work on Sweet Tooth and The Underwater Welder). Lemire won an Eisner Award for Best New Series in 2017 for his work on Black Hammer.

Lemire has also been nominated for an Ignatz, a Harvey, and multiple other Eisner Awards (most recently for Barbalien: Red Planet by Dark Horse).

In 2011 Essex County was selected as one of five titles for Canada Reads, with the theme of "The Essential Canadian Novels of the Decade." Its celebrity champion was Sara Quin. Essex County was eliminated in the first round, but later placed #1 in a "People's Choice" poll with more votes than all other books combined.

== Personal life ==
As of 2009, Lemire lives in Toronto, Ontario, Canada. He is married and has a son.

== Bibliography ==
=== Early work ===
- Ashtray #1–2 (writer/artist, Ashtray Press, 2003)
- Beowulf #6–7 (writer/artist, Speakeasy, 2006)
- The Fortress (writer/artist, strip in UR Magazine, 2006)
- Bio-Graphical (writer/artist, strip in Driven, 2008)

=== Dark Horse Comics ===
- Noir: A Collection of Crime Comics: "The Old Silo" (w/a, anthology graphic novel, tpb, 104 pages, 2009, ISBN 1595823581)
- The World of Black Hammer
  - Black Hammer #1–13 (w, with Dean Ormston, June 2016 – September 2017) collected in Black Hammer Library Edition Volume 1 (hc, 408 pages, 2018, ISBN 978-1506710730)
    - Black Hammer – Volume 1: Secret Origins #1–6 (tpb, 184 pages, 2017, ISBN 1616557869)
    - Black Hammer – Volume 2: The Event #7–11, #13 (tpb, 176 pages, 2017, ISBN 1506701981)
  - Black Hammer: Age of Doom #1–12 (w, with Dean Ormston, April 2018 – September 2019) collected in Black Hammer Library Edition Volume 2 (hc, 400 pages, 2020, ISBN 978-1506711850)
    - Black Hammer – Volume 3: Age of Doom, Part One #1–5 (tpb, 136 pages, 2019, ISBN 1506703895)
    - Black Hammer – Volume 4: Age of Doom, Part Two #6–12 (tpb, 192 pages, 2019, ISBN 1506708161)
  - Black Hammer: Streets of Spiral (tpb, 128 pages, 2019, ISBN 1506709419) collected
    - Black Hammer: Giant Sized Annual (w, one-shot, with Dustin Nguyen, Emi Lenox, Nate Powell, Matt Kindt, and Ray Fawkes, January 2017) collected in Black Hammer Library Edition Volume 1 (hc, 408 pages, 2018, ISBN 978-1506710730)
    - Black Hammer: Cthu-Louise (w, one-shot, with Emi Lenox, December 2018) collected in Black Hammer Library Edition Volume 2 (hc, 400 pages, 2020, ISBN 978-1506711850)
    - "Horrors to Come" (w, short story, with David Rubín in Free Comic Book Day 2019: Stranger Things / Black Hammer, May 2019)
    - The World of Black Hammer Encyclopedia (w, one-shot, with Tate Brombal and various artists, July 2019) collected in Black Hammer Library Edition Volume 2 (hc, 400 pages, 2020, ISBN 978-1506711850)
  - Black Hammer / Justice League: Hammer of Justice! #1–5 (w, limited series, with Michael Walsh, July 2019 – November 2019) collected in Black Hammer / Justice League: Hammer of Justice! (hc, 168 pages, 2020, ISBN 1506710999)
  - Sherlock Frankenstein and the Legion of Evil #1–4 (w, limited series, with David Rubín, October 2017 – January 2018) collected with Black Hammer #12 in Sherlock Frankenstein and the Legion of Evil (tpb, 152 pages, 2018, ISBN 150670526X) and The World of Black Hammer Library Edition Volume 1 (hc, 256 pages, 2020, ISBN 978-1506719955)
  - Doctor Star and the Kingdom of Lost Tomorrows #1–4 (w, limited series, with Max Fiumara, March–June 2018) collected in Doctor Star and the Kingdom of Lost Tomorrows: From the World of Black Hammer (tpb, 128 pages, 2018, ISBN 1506706592), Doctor Andromeda and the Kingdom of Lost Tomorrows: From the World of Black Hammer (tpb, 104 pages, 2021, ISBN 978-1506723297), and The World of Black Hammer Library Edition Volume 1 (hc, 256 pages, 2020, ISBN 978-1506719955)
  - The Quantum Age #1–6 (w, limited series, with Wilfredo Torres, July 2018 – January 2019) collected in The Quantum Age (tpb, 176 pages, 2019, ISBN 1506708412) and The World of Black Hammer Library Edition Volume 2 (hc, 296 pages, 2021, ISBN 978-1506719962)
  - Black Hammer '45 #1–4 (w, limited series, with Ray Fawkes and Matt Kindt, March 2019 – June 2019) collected in Black Hammer '45 (tpb, 120 pages, 2019, ISBN 1506708501) and The World of Black Hammer Library Edition Volume 2 (hc, 296 pages, 2021, ISBN 978-1506719962)
  - Skulldigger + Skeleton Boy #1–6 (w, limited series, with Tonci Zonjic, December 2019 – January 2021) collected in Skulldigger + Skeleton Boy (tpb, 168 pages, 2021, ISBN 9781506710334) and The World of Black Hammer Library Edition Volume 4 (hc, 288 pages, 2022, ISBN 978-1506726014)
  - Colonel Weird: Cosmagog #1–4 (w, limited series, with Tyler Crook, October 2020 – January 2021) collected in Colonel Weird: Cosmagog (tpb, 112 pages, 2021, ISBN 9781506715162) and The World of Black Hammer Library Edition Volume 3 (hc, 248 pages, 2021, ISBN 978-1506719979)
  - Barbalien: Red Planet #1–5 (w [with Tate Brombal], limited series with Gabriel Hernández Walta, November 2020 – March 2021) collected in Barbalien: Red Planet (tpb, 120 pages, 2021, ISBN 9781506715803) and The World of Black Hammer Library Edition Volume 3 (hc, 248 pages, 2021, ISBN 978-1506719979)
  - Black Hammer: Reborn #1–12 (w, with Caitlin Yarsky, Malachi Ward, Matthew Sheean, and Rich Tomasso, June 2021 – May 2022)
    - Black Hammer Volume 5: Reborn Part One #1–4 (tpb, 112 pages, 2022, ISBN 978-1506714264)
    - Black Hammer Volume 5: Reborn Part Two #5–8 (tpb, 112 pages, 2022, ISBN 978-1506715155)
    - Black Hammer Volume 5: Reborn Part Three #9–12 (tpb, 104 pages, 2022, ISBN 978-1506720159)
  - The Unbelievable Unteens #1–4 (w, limited series, with Tyler Crook, August 2021 – January 2021) collected in The Unbelievable Unteens: From the World of Black Hammer Volume 1 (tpb, 128 pages, 2022, ISBN 978-1506724362) and The World of Black Hammer Library Edition Volume 4 (hc, 288 pages, 2022, ISBN 978-1506726014)
  - The Last Days of Black Hammer (w, limited series with Stefano Simeone, 110 pages, Substack, January 2022 – ) republished by Dark Horse as The Last Days of Black Hammer: From the World of Black Hammer (tpb, 136 pages, 2023, ISBN 9781506731124)
- Berserker Unbound (w, limited series, with Mike Deodato, August 2019 – November 2019) collected in Berserker Unbound (hc, 136 pages, 2020, ISBN 9781506713373)
- Mazebook (writer/artist, limited series, September 2021 – January 2022) collected in Mazebook (hc, 256 pages, 2022, ISBN 9781506723662)
- Snow Angels (w, 10-issue limited series, with Jock, ComiXology Originals, February – November 2021) republished by Dark Horse Comics as:
  - Snow Angels Volume 1 #1–4 (tpb, 104 pages, 2022, ISBN 9781506726489)
  - Snow Angels Volume 2 #5–10 (tpb, 160 pages, 2022, ISBN 9781506726496)

=== DC Comics ===
- Atom:
  - Brightest Day: The Atom Special #1: "Nucleus, Prologue" (w, with Mahmud Asrar, one-shot, July 2010)
  - Adventure Comics #516–521 (w, with Mahmud Asrar, co-feature, July 2010 – December 2010):
    - "Splitting the Atom" (in #516)
    - "Atom Strange" (in #517)
    - "We are All Atoms" (in #518)
    - "Colonized" (in #519)
    - "Atom-Ant" (in #520)
    - "Weapons of Mass-Reduction" (in #521)
  - Giant-Size Atom #1: "Nucleus, Conclusion" (w, with Mahmud Asrar, Allan Goldman and Robson Rocha, one-shot, March 2011)
- Action Comics vol. 1 #892: "A look at things to come in... Superboy" (with Pier Gallo, August 2010)
- Superboy vol. 4 #1–11 (November 2010 – August 2011)
  - Superboy: Smallville Attacks #1-11 (tpb, 256 pages, 2011, ISBN 1-4012-3251-5)
- Flashpoint: Frankenstein and the Creatures of the Unknown #1–3 (w, with Ibraim Roberson, June 2011 – August 2011) collected in Flashpoint: The World of Flashpoint Featuring Green Lantern (tpb, 232 pages, 2012, ISBN 1-4012-3406-2)
- Jonah Hex vol. 2 #69 (a, with Justin Gray and Jimmy Palmiotti, July 2011) collected in Bury Me in Hell (tpb, 224 pages, 2011, ISBN 1-4012-3249-3)
- Animal Man vol. 2 #0–29, Annual #1–2 (w [with Scott Snyder]/a, with Travel Foreman, John Paul Leon, Steve Pugh, Alberto Ponticelli, Timothy Green II, Francis Portela, Rafael Albuquerque, and Cully Hamner, September 2011 – March 2014)
  - Volume 1: The Hunt #1-6 (tpb, 144 pages, 2012, ISBN 1-4012-3507-7)
  - Volume 2: Animal vs. Man #7-11 (tpb, 160 pages, 2012, ISBN 1-4012-3800-9)
  - Volume 3: Rotworld: The Red Kingdom #12-17 (tpb, 232 pages, 2013, ISBN 1-4012-4262-6)
  - Volume 4: Splinter Species #18-23 (tpb, 144 pages, 2014, ISBN 1-4012-4644-3)
  - Volume 5: Evolve or Die! #24-29 (tpb, 144 pages, 2014, ISBN 1-4012-4994-9)
  - Animal Man by Jeff Lemire Omnibus #0-29, Annual #1-2, and Swamp Thing #12 and #17 (hc, 816 pages, 2019, ISBN 978-1401289416)
- Frankenstein, Agent of S.H.A.D.E. #1–9 (w, with Alberto Ponticelli, September 2011 – May 2012) collected as:
  - War of the Monsters (collects #1–6, tpb, 144 pages, 2012, ISBN 1-4012-3471-2)
  - Son of Satan's Ring (collects #7–9, tpb, 144 pages, 2013, ISBN 1-4012-3818-1)
- O.M.A.C. #5 (w [with Dan DiDio and Keith Giffen], January 2012) collected in O.M.A.C. Vol. 1: Omactivate! (tpb, 192 pages, 2012, ISBN 978-1401234829)
- Men of War #8 (w, with Matt Kindt and Thomas Derenick, April 2012) collected in Men of War: Uneasy Company (tpb, 256 pages, 2012, ISBN 1-4012-3499-2)
- Justice League Dark #9–23, 0, Annual #1 (w, May 2012 – August 2013) collected in Justice League Dark: The New 52 Omnibus (hc, 1648 pages, 2021, ISBN 978-1779513137)
  - Volume 2: The Books of Magic #7–13 (tpb, 224 pages, 2013, ISBN 1-4012-4024-0)
  - Volume 3: The Death of Magic #12–21 (tpb, 192 pages, 2014, ISBN 1-4012-4245-6)
  - Justice League: Trinity War (tpb, 320 pages, 2014, ISBN 1-4012-4519-6) collects:
    - "Trinity War" (with Mikel Janín, in #22–23, 2013)
- National Comics: Eternity #1 (w, with Cully Hamner, one-shot, July 2012)
- Swamp Thing #12, 17 (w [with Scott Snyder] with Marco Rudy and Andrew Belanger, October 2012 – April 2013) collected in Swamp Thing Vol. 3: Rotworld (tpb, 208 pages, 2013, ISBN 978-1401242640), Swamp Thing By Scott Snyder: Deluxe Edition (hc, 512 pages, 2015, ISBN 978-1401258702), Animal Man by Jeff Lemire Omnibus, and Swamp Thing: The New 52 Omnibus (hc, 1160 pages, 2021, ISBN 978-1779508140)
- Legends of the Dark Knight #1: "The Butler Did It" (a, with Damon Lindelof, October 2012)
- Justice League vol. 2 #13: "On the Outs" (w [with Geoff Johns], October 2012) collected in Volume 3: Throne of Atlantis (hc, 192 pages, 2013, ISBN 978-1401242404)
- Green Arrow vol. 5 #17–34 (w, with Andrea Sorrentino and Denys Cowan, February 2013 – August 2014)
  - Volume 4: The Kill Machine #17–24, 23.1: Count Vertigo (tpb, 208 pages, 2014, ISBN 1-4012-4690-7)
  - Volume 5: The Outsiders War #25–31 (tpb, 176 pages, 2014, ISBN 1-4012-5044-0)
  - Volume 6: Broken #32–34, Green Arrow: Future's End #1, Secret Origins #4 (tpb, 128 pages, 2015, ISBN 1-4012-5474-8)
  - Green Arrow By Jeff Lemire & Andrea Sorrentino Deluxe Edition #17–34, 23.1: Count Vertigo, Green Arrow: Future's End #1, Secret Origins #4 (hc, 464 pages, 2016, ISBN 978-1401257613)
- Constantine #1–4 (w, with Ray Fawkes (w), Renato Guedes (a) & Fabiano Neves (a), March 2013 – June 2013)
  - Volume 1: The Spark and the Flame #1–6 (tpb, 144 pages, 2014, ISBN 1-4012-4323-1)
- Adventures of Superman vol. 2 #1: "Fortress" (w/a, May 2013) collected in Volume 1 (tpb, 168 pages, 2014, ISBN 978-1401246884)
- Batman Black and White vol. 2 #2: "Winter's End" (w, with Alex Niño, October 2013) collected in Volume 4 (hc, 288 pages, 2014, ISBN 1-4012-4643-5)
- Justice League United #0–10, Annual #1, Futures End #1 (w, April 2014 – March 2015):
  - Volume 1: Justice League Canada #0-5 (hc, 192 pages, 2015, ISBN 1-4012-5235-4)
  - Volume 2: The Infinitus Saga #6-10 (hc, 232 pages, 2015, ISBN 1-4012-5766-6)
- The New 52: Futures End #1–48 (w [with Keith Giffen, Brian Azzarello, and Dan Jurgens], April 2014 – April 2015)
  - Volume 1 #0–17 (tpb, 416 pages, 2014, ISBN 1-4012-5244-3)
  - Volume 2 #18-30 (tpb, 304 pages, 2015, ISBN 1-4012-5602-3)
  - Volume 3 #31-48 (tpb, 408 pages, 2015, ISBN 1-4012-5878-6)
- Batman/Superman #10: "Enter the Microverse" (w, with Karl Kerschl and Scott Hepburn, May, 2014) collected in Second Chance (hc, 160 pages, 2015, ISBN 1-4012-5424-1)
- Teen Titans: Earth One (w, with Terry Dodson, graphic novel)
  - Volume One (hc, 144 pages, November 2014, ISBN 1-4012-4556-0)
  - Volume Two (hc, 144 pages, August 2016, ISBN 978-1401259068)
- DC Holiday Special 2017 #1: "The Reminder" (w, one-shot with Giuseppe Camuncoli, December 2017)
- Hawkman: Found #1 (w, with Bryan Hitch and Kevin Nowlan, December 2017) collected in Dark Nights: Metal: The Resistance (tpb, 128 pages, 2018, ISBN 978-1401282981)
- The Terrifics (w, with Ivan Reis, Jose Luis, Joe Bennett, Doc Shaner, Dale Eaglesham, and Viktor Bogdanovic, February 2018 – March 2019)
  - Volume 1: Meet the Terrifics #1–6 (tpb, 144 pages, 2018, ISBN 978-1401283360)
  - Volume 2: Tom Strong and the Terrifics #7–14 (tpb, 184 pages, 2019, ISBN 978-1401291488)
- Inferior Five: "Peacemaker" (writer/artist, September 2019 – April 2021) collected in Inferior Five (tpb, 144 pages, 2021, ISBN 978-1779513472)
- Joker: Killer Smile #1–3 (w, with Andrea Sorrentino, October 2019 – February 2020) collected in Joker: Killer Smile (hc, 152 pages, 2020, ISBN 978-1779502698)
- The Question: The Deaths of Vic Sage #1–4 (w, with Denys Cowan and Bill Sienkiewicz, November 2019 – August 2020) collected in The Question: The Deaths of Vic Sage (hc, 200 pages, 2020, ISBN 978-1779505583)
- Batman: The Smile Killer #1 (w, one-shot with Andrea Sorrentino, June 2020) collected in Joker: Killer Smile (hc, 152 pages, 2020, ISBN 978-1779502698)
- Legion of Super-Heroes #8 (a, with Brian Michael Bendis, August 2020) collected in Legion of Super-Heroes Vol. 2: The Trial of the Legion (tpb, 160 pages, 2020, ISBN 978-1779505637)
- Sweet Tooth: The Return #1–6 (w/a, limited series November 2020 – April 2021) collected in Sweet Tooth: The Return (tpb, 152 pages, 2021, ISBN 978-1779510327)
- Dark Nights: Death Metal - The Last Stories of the DC Universe #1: "Green Lantern in "Last Knights"" (w, one-shot with Rafael Albuquerque, December 2020) collected in Dark Nights: Death Metal: War of the Multiverses (tpb, 176 pages, 2021, ISBN 978-1779510068)
- Green Arrow 80th Anniversary 100-Page Super Spectacular #1: "The Last Green Arrow Story" (w, one-shot with Andrea Sorrentino, June 2021)
- Robin & Batman #1–3 (w, Dustin Nguyen, November 2021 – January 2022) collected in Robin & Batman (tpb, 144 pages, 2022, ISBN 978-1779516596)
- Robin & Batman: Jason Todd #1-3 (w, Dustin Nguyen, June 2025 - August 2025) collected in Robin & Batman: Jason Todd (hc, 144 Pages, 2025, ISBN 978-1799503279)
- Swamp Thing: Green Hell #1–3 (w, limited series with Doug Mahnke, December 2021 – May 2022)
- The Fury of Firestorm (w, with Rafael De Latorre, April 2026 – present)

=== Image Comics ===
- Outlaw Territory – Volume 2: "Coffin for Mr. Bishell" (a, with Joshua Hale Fialkov, anthology graphic novel, tpb, 240 pages, 2011, ISBN 9781607063216)
- The CBLDF Presents Liberty Annual '11: "Being Normal" (a, with Mark Waid, 2011)
- Descender #1–32 (w, with Dustin Nguyen, March 2015 – July 2018)
  - Volume 1: Tin Stars #1–6 (tpb, 160 pages, 2015, ISBN 9781632154262)
  - Volume 2: Machine Moon #7–11 (tpb, 116 pages, 2016, ISBN 9781632156761)
  - Volume 3: Singularities #12–16 (tpb, 128 pages, 2016, ISBN 9781632158789)
  - Volume 4: Orbital Mechanics #17–21 (tpb, 120 pages, 2017, ISBN 9781534301931)
  - Volume 5: Rise of The Robots #22–26 (tpb, 120 pages, 2018, ISBN 9781534303454)
  - Volume 6: The Machine War #27–32 (tpb, 120 pages, 2018, ISBN 9781534306905)
  - Descender: The Deluxe Edition Volume 1 #1–16 (hc, 400 pages, 2017, ISBN 9781534303461)
  - Descender: The Deluxe Edition Volume 2 #17–32 (hc, 424 pages, 2019, ISBN 9781534314559)
- Ascender #1–18 (w, with Dustin Nguyen, April 2019 – August 2021)
  - Volume 1: The Haunted Galaxy #1–5 (tpb, 136 pages, 2019, ISBN 9781534313484)
  - Volume 2: The Dead Sea #6–10 (tpb, 128 pages, 2020, ISBN 9781534315938)
  - Volume 3: The Digital Mage #11–14 (tpb, 104 pages, 2020, ISBN 9781534317260)
  - Volume 4: Star Seed #15–18 (tpb, 104 pages, 2021, ISBN 978-1534319226)
  - Ascender: The Deluxe Edition, Volume 1 #1–18 (hc, 448 pages, 2022, ISBN 978-1534322363)
- Plutona #1–5 (w, with Emi Lenox, five-issue miniseries, September 2015 – January 2016) collected in Plutona (tpb, 152 pages, 2016, ISBN 9781632156013)
- A.D. After Death Books 1–3 (a, with Scott Snyder, 3 books, November 2016 – May 2017) collected in A.D. After Death (hc, 256 pages, 2017, ISBN 9781632158680)
- Royal City #1–14 (w/a, March 2017 – August 2018)
  - Volume 1: Next of Kin #1–5 (tpb, 160 pages, 2017, ISBN 9781534302624)
  - Volume 2: Sonic Youth #6–10 (tpb, 128 pages, 2018, ISBN 9781534305526)
  - Volume 3: We All Float On #11–14 (tpb, 120 pages, 2018, ISBN 9781534308497)
  - Royal City Book 1: The Complete Collection (hc, 408 pages, 2020, ISBN 978-1534316058)
- Gideon Falls #1–27 (w, with Andrea Sorrentino, March 2018 – December 2020)
  - Volume 1: The Black Barn #1–6 (tpb, 160 pages, 2018, ISBN 9781534308527)
  - Volume 2: Original Sins #7–11 (tpb, 136 pages, 2019, ISBN 9781534310674)
  - Volume 3: Stations of The Cross #12–16 (tpb, 136 pages, 2019, ISBN 9781534313446)
  - Volume 4: The Pentoculus #17–21 (tpb, 128 pages, 2020, ISBN 9781534315136)
  - Volume 5: Wicked Worlds #22–26 (tpb, 120 pages, 2020, ISBN 9781534317222)
  - Volume 6: The End #27 (tpb, 120 pages, 2021, ISBN 9781534318670)
  - Gideon Falls Deluxe Edition, Book One #1–16 (hc, 432 pages, 2021, ISBN 9781534319189)
  - Gideon Falls Deluxe Edition, Book Two #17–27 (hc, 336 pages, 2022, ISBN 9781534323292)
- Family Tree #1–12 (w, with Phil Hester, November 2019 – March 2021)
  - Volume 1: Sapling #1–4 (tpb, 96 pages, 2020, ISBN 9781534316492)
  - Volume 2: Seeds #5–8 (tpb, 96 pages, 2020, ISBN 9781534316966)
  - Volume 3: Forest #9–12 (tpb, 120 pages, 2021, ISBN 9781534318632)
- The Silver Coin #4 (w, with Michael Walsh, July 2021) collected in The Silver Coin, Volume 1 (tpb, 144 pages, 2021, ISBN 978-1534319929)
- Primordial #1–6 (w, with Andrea Sorrentino, six-issue miniseries, September 2021 – February 2022) collected in Primordial (hc, 160 pages, 2022, ISBN 9781534321250)
- Little Monsters #1–ongoing (w, with Dustin Nguyen, March 2022 – present)
  - Volume 1 #1–6 (tpb, 152 pages, 2022, ISBN 9781534323186)
- The Bone Orchard Mythos (w, with Andrea Sorrentino, May 2022 – 2024)
  - Free Comic Book Day 2022: The Bone Orchard Mythos—Prelude (May 2022)
  - The Bone Orchard Mythos: The Passageway (hc, 96 pages, June 2022, ISBN 978-1534322240)
- Fishflies (w/a, Substack, September 2021 – present) republished by Image Comics as:
  - Fishflies Volume 1 (2023)

=== Marvel Comics ===
- Strange Tales II #1: "A Civilized-Thing" (writer/artist, 2010, collected in ST2, hc, 144 pages, 2011, ISBN 0-7851-4822-1; tpb, 2011, ISBN 0-7851-4823-X)
- All-New Hawkeye vol. 1 (March 2015 – September 2015)
  - Volume 5: All-New Hawkeye (tpb, 112 pages, 2015, ISBN 0-7851-9403-7) collects:
    - "Wunderkammer" (w, with Ramon K. Perez, in #1–5, 2015)
- All-New Hawkeye vol. 2 #1–6 (w, with Ramon K. Perez, November 2015 – April 2016)
  - Volume 6: Hawkeyes #1-6 (tpb, 136 pages, 2016, ISBN 0-7851-9946-2)
- Extraordinary X-Men #1–20 (w, November 2015 – March 2017)
  - Volume 1: X-Haven #1-5 (with Humberto Ramos, tpb, 120 pages, ISBN 0-7851-9934-9, 2016)
  - Volume 2: Apocalypse Wars #6-12 (with Victor Ibáñez and Humberto Ramos, tpb, 168 pages, 2016, ISBN 0-7851-9935-7)
  - Volume 3: Kingdoms Fall #13-16, Annual (with Victor Ibáñez, tpb, 128 pages, 2017, ISBN 0-7851-9936-5)
  - Volume 4: IvX #17-20 (with Eric Koda, Victor Ibáñez, Andrea Sorrentino, tpb, 112 pages, 2017, ISBN 0-7851-9937-3)
- Old Man Logan vol. 2 #1–24 (w, January 2016 – May 2017)
  - Volume 1: Berzerker #1-4 (tpb, 128 pages, 2016, ISBN 0-7851-9620-X)
  - Volume 2: Bordertown #5-8 (tpb, 112 pages, 2016, ISBN 0-7851-9621-8)
  - Volume 3: The Last Ronin #9-13 (tpb, 112 pages, 2017, ISBN 1-30290-314-4)
  - Volume 4: Old Monsters #14-18 (tpb, 112 pages, 2017, ISBN 1-30290-573-2)
  - Volume 5: Past Lives #19-24 (tpb, 136 pages, 2017, ISBN 1-30290-574-0)
- Moon Knight vol. 8 #1–14 (w, April 2016 – May 2017)
  - Volume 1: Lunatic #1-5 (tpb, 120 pages, 2016, ISBN 0-7851-9953-5)
  - Volume 2: Reincarnations #6-9 (tpb, 112 pages, 2017, ISBN 0-7851-9954-3)
  - Volume 3: Birth and Death #10-14 (tpb, 112 pages, 2017, ISBN 1-30290-288-1)
  - Moon Knight By Lemire & Smallwood: The Complete Collection (tpb, 320 pages, 2022, ISBN 978-1302933630)
- Death of X (w, 4-issue limited series, with Charles Soule, Aaron Kuder and Javier Garrón, October–November 2016) collected in Death of X (tpb, 136 pages, 2017, ISBN 1-30290-337-3)
- Thanos vol. 2 #1-12 (w, November 2016 – October 2017)
  - Volume 1: Thanos Returns #1-6 (tpb, 136 pages, 2017, ISBN 1-30290-557-0)
  - Volume 2: The God Quarry #7-12 (tpb, 112 pages, 2018, ISBN 9781302905583)
- Inhumans vs. X-Men (w, 6-issue limited series, with Charles Soule, Leinil Francis Yu and Javier Garrón, December 2016 – March 2017) collected in Inhumans Vs. X-Men (hc, 208 pages, 2017, ISBN 1-30290-653-4)
- Sentry vol. 3 #1-5 (w, with Kim Jacinto and Joshua Cassara June 2018 – October 2018)
  - Sentry: Man of Two Worlds #1-5 (tpb, 112 pages, 2018, ISBN 1-30291-338-7)
- Immortal Hulk: The Threshing Place #1 (w, one-shot, with Mike Del Mundo, September 2020) collected in Immortal Hulk: Great Power (tpb, 112 pages, 2021, ISBN 978-1302931179)

=== Other publishers ===
- Minor Arcana (w/a, Boom! Studios, September 2024 – Present)

=== TKO Studios ===
- Sentient (December 2019) In 2020 Sentient became the first title from TKO to be nominated for an Eisner Award, when the series picked up a nomination for Best Limited Series.

=== Top Shelf Productions ===
- The Complete Essex County (hc, 512 pages, 2009, ISBN 1-60309-046-0; tpb, 2009, ISBN 1-60309-038-X) collects:
  - Tales from the Farm (writer/artist, graphic novel, tpb, 112 pages, 2007, ISBN 1-891830-88-0)
  - Ghost Stories (writer/artist, graphic novel, tpb, 224 pages, 2007, ISBN 1-891830-94-5)
  - The Essex County Boxing Club (writer/artist, one-shot, 2008)
  - The Sad and Lonely Life of Eddie Elephant Ears: A Tale from Essex County (writer/artist, one-shot, 2008)
  - The Country Nurse (writer/artist, graphic novel, tpb, 128 pages, 2008, ISBN 1-891830-95-3)
- Awesome 2: Awesomer: "The Horseless Rider" (writer/artist, anthology graphic novel, tpb, 200 pages, 2009, ISBN 1-60309-039-8)
- The Underwater Welder (writer/artist, graphic novel, tpb, 224 pages, 2012, ISBN 1-6030-9074-6)
- Lost Dogs (writer/artist, graphic novel, Ashtray Press, 2005) republished by Top Shelf Productions as Lost Dogs (tpb, 104 pages, 2012, ISBN 978-1603091541)

=== Simon & Schuster ===
- Roughneck (w/a, graphic novel, 272 pages, Simon & Schuster, 2017, ISBN 1501160990)
- Frogcatchers (w/a, graphic novel, 112 pages, Gallery 13 imprint of Simon & Schuster, 2019, ISBN 9781982107376)

=== Valiant Comics ===
- The Valiant (w, 4-issue limited series, with Matt Kindt and Paolo Rivera, December 2014 – March 2015) collected in The Valiant (tpb, 112 pages, 2015, ISBN 1939346606)
- Bloodshot Reborn #0–18, Annual #1 (w, April 2015 – October 2016)
  - Volume 1: Colorado #1–5 (with Mico Suayan and Raúl Allén, tpb, 144 pages, 2015, ISBN 1939346673)
  - Volume 2: The Hunt #6–9 (with Butch Guice, tpb, 112 pages, 2016, ISBN 1939346827)
  - Volume 3: The Analog Man #10–13 (with Lewis LaRosa, tpb, 112 pages, 2016, ISBN 1682151336)
  - Volume 4: Bloodshot Island #14–18, Annual #1 (with Mico Suayan and Tomás Giorello, tpb, 192 pages, 2017, ISBN 1682151670)
- Book of Death: The Fall of Bloodshot #1 (w, with Doug Braithwaite, July 2015) collected in Book of Death: The Fall of the Valiant Universe (tpb, 112 pages, 2016, ISBN 1939346983)
- 4001 AD: Bloodshot #1 (w, with Doug Braithwaite, June 2016), collected in 4001 A.D.: Beyond New Japan (tpb, 112 pages, 2016, ISBN 1682151468)
- Bloodshot U.S.A. #1–4 (w, with Doug Braithwaite, October 2016 – January 2017) collected in Bloodshot U.S.A. (tpb, 112 pages, 2017, ISBN 1682151956)
- Divinity III: Komandar Bloodshot #1 (w, with Clayton Crain, December 2016) collected in Divinity III: Heroes of the Glorious Stalinverse (tpb, 112 pages, 2017, ISBN 1682152073)
- Bloodshot Salvation #1–12 (September 2017 – August 2018)

=== Vertigo ===
- The Nobody (writer/artist, graphic novel, hc, 144 pages, 2009, ISBN 1-4012-2080-0)
- Sweet Tooth (writer/artist, September 2009 – January 2013) collected as:
  - Out of the Deep Woods (collects #1–5, tpb, 128 pages, 2010, ISBN 1-4012-2696-5)
  - In Captivity (collects #6–11, tpb, 144 pages, 2010, ISBN 1-4012-2854-2)
  - Animal Armies (collects #12–17, tpb, 144 pages, 2011, ISBN 1-4012-3170-5)
  - Endangered Species (collects #18–25, tpb, 176 pages, 2012, ISBN 1-4012-3361-9)
  - Unnatural Habit (collects #26–32, tpb, 160 pages, 2012, ISBN 1-4012-3723-1)
  - Wild Game (collects #33–40, tpb, 200 pages, 2013, ISBN 1-4012-4029-1)
  - Sweet Tooth Compendium (collects #1-40, 920 pages, 2021, ISBN 978-1779510242)
- House of Mystery #18: "The Tale of Brutus the Bold" (a, with Lilah Sturges, October 2009) collected in Volume 4 (tpb, 160 pages, 2010, ISBN 1-4012-2756-2)
- Strange Adventures vol. 2 #1: "Ultra the Multi-Alien: The Life and Death of Ace Arn" (writer/artist, one-shot, May 2011) collected in Strange Adventures (tpb, 160 pages, 2014, ISBN 978-1401243937)
- Ghosts #1: "Ghost-for-Hire" (a, with Geoff Johns, October 2012)
- Time Warp #1: "R. I. P." (a, with Damon Lindelof, March 2013)
- American Vampire Anthology #1: "Canadian Vampire" (w, with Ray Fawkes, August 2013) collected in Volume 6 (hc, 144 pages, 2014, ISBN 978-1401247089)
- Trillium (writer/artist, eight-issue limited series, August 2013 – April 2014)
  - Trillium (tpb, 192 pages, 2014, ISBN 1-4012-4900-0) collects:
    - "The Scientist/The Soldier" (in #1, 2013)
    - "Binary Systems" (in #2, 2013)
    - "Telemetry" (in #3, 2013)
    - "Entropy" (in #4, 2014)
    - "Starcrossed" (in #5, 2014)
    - "Escape Velocity" (in #6, 2014)
    - "All the Shadows Have Stars in Them..." (in #7, 2014)
    - "Two Stars Become One" (in #8, 2014)
- Vertigo Quarterly: Black: "Sweet Tooth: Black" (w/a, January 2015) collected in CMYK (tpb, 296 pages, 2015, ISBN 978-1401253363)

| Preceded by Karl Kesel | Superboy writer 2010–2011 | Succeeded by Scott Lobdell |
| Preceded by Peter Milligan | Justice League Dark writer 2012–2013 (with Ray Fawkes in 2013) | Succeeded by J.M. DeMatteis |
| Preceded by Ann Nocenti | Green Arrow writer 2013–2014 | Succeeded by Ben Sokolowski & Andrew Kreisberg |
| Preceded by Peter Milligan (Hellblazer) | Constantine writer 2013 (with Ray Fawkes) | Succeeded by Ray Fawkes |
| Preceded by Matt Fraction (Hawkeye) | All-New Hawkeye writer 2015–2016 | Succeeded by Kelly Thompson (Hawkeye) |
| Preceded by Brian Michael Bendis | Old Man Logan writer 2016–2017 | Succeeded by Ed Brisson |
| Preceded by Cullen Bunn | Moon Knight writer 2016–2017 | Succeeded by Max Bemis |
