= Frogcatchers =

2019 graphic novel by Jeff Lemire

- Author: Jeff Lemire
- Illustrator: Jeff Lemire
- Publisher: Gallery 13
- Publication date: 24 September 2019
- Pages: 112
- ISBN: 978-1-982-10738-3

Frogcatchers is a graphic novel by Jeff Lemire, published 24 September 2019 by Gallery 13.

== Premise ==
Frogcatchers follows a man who, upon waking up in a hotel room with little memory, meets a boy who tells him that a frog is out to get them both.

== Critical reception ==
In a review for Quill & Quire, Andrew Woodrow-Butcher wrote that Frogcatchers is "a brilliant piece from an accomplished cartoonist who is continuing to explore and grow even while at the top of his game". Publishers Weekly wrote that the book is "carried off with striking visual themes", though noting that it "points rather obviously to the pay-off".
