= Essex County (TV series) =

Canadian television series

- Genre: Drama
- Based on: Essex County Trilogy by Jeff Lemire
- Directed by: Andrew Cividino
- Country of origin: Canada
- Original language: English
- No. of episodes: 5

Production
- Executive producers: Jeff Lemire; Eilis Kirwan; Christina Piovesan; Andrew Cividino
- Production companies: First Generation Films; ITV Studios; Media Musketeer Studios

Original release
- Network: CBC; CBC Gem
- Release: March 19 – April 16, 2023

Essex County is a Canadian drama television limited series that premiered March 19, 2023 on CBC Television.

== Premise ==
An adaptation of Jeff Lemire's graphic novel Essex County Trilogy, the series centres on two interconnected families in Essex County, Ontario.

Lester is a young boy who moves in with his uncle Ken after his mother's death, turning to Jimmy, his biological father who has returned to Essex County; Anne is a nurse who is caring for her ailing uncle Lou.

== Cast ==
- Molly Parker as Anne, a nurse who takes care of her sick uncle, Lou, with whom she has a strained relationship.
  - Jordyn Gillis plays a young Anne in the opening scene of Episode 3.
- Brian J. Smith as Ken, a closeted farmer who takes in his nephew, Lester, following his sister's death.
- Stephen McHattie as Lou, uncle of Anne, who has dementia.
  - Stephen Kalyn plays a young Lou
- Finlay Wojtak-Hissong as Lester, nephew of Ken and Anne whose mother died of cancer and is taken in by Ken.
- Kevin Durand as Jimmy
- Tamara Podemski as Joy
- Rossif Sutherland as Doug
- Jim Calarco
- Daniel Maslany as Luke, a potential love interest of Ken.
- Martin Roach as Officer Danny Laraque

== Episodes ==
No.	Title	Directed by	Written by	Original release date
1	Episode 1	Andrew Cividino	Story by : Aaron Martin and Jeff Lemire; Teleplay by : Aaron Martin	March 19, 2023
2	Episode 2	Andrew Cividino	Story by : Adriana Maggs; Teleplay by : Adriana Maggs and Jeff Lemire and Eilis Kirwan	March 26, 2023
3	Episode 3	Andrew Cividino	Story by : Alex Levine and Eilis Kirwan; Teleplay by : Eilis Kirwan	April 2, 2023
4	Episode 4	Andrew Cividino	Jeff Lemire & Eilis Kirwan	April 9, 2023
5	Episode 5	Andrew Cividino	Jeff Lemire & Eilis Kirwan	April 16, 2023

== Development ==
The series was written by Jeff Lemire and Eilis Kirwan. It was shot principally in North Bay and West Nipissing, in fall 2022.

== Release ==
A first look trailer was released on February 21, 2023. The series premiered March 19, 2023 on CBC and CBC Gem
