= Dustin Nguyen (comics) =

American comic book artist

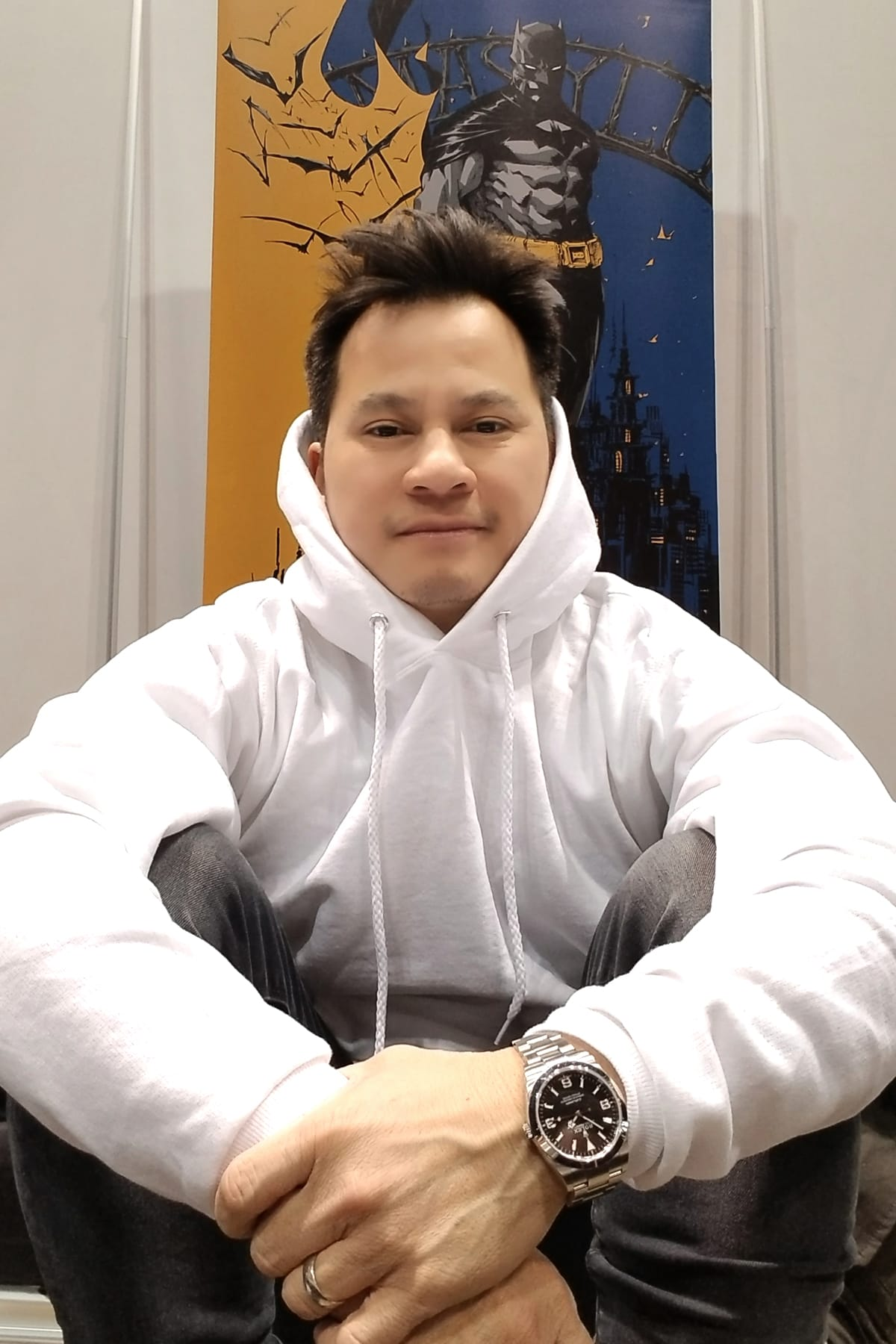
- Nguyen at C2E2
- Born: 1976 (age 49–50)
- Areas: Penciller, Inker, Colourist
- Notable works: Ascender; Descender; The Authority; Detective Comics; Batman: Streets of Gotham; Batman: Lil Gotham
- Awards: 2016 Eisner Award for Best Painter/Multimedia Artist

Dustin Nguyen (born 1976) is a comic book artist. He has worked for DC Comics and WildStorm since 2000. He is best known for being the artist on his and Jeff Lemire's creator-owned Image Comics series, Descender, for which he won the 2016 Eisner Award for Best Painter/Multimedia Artist.

== Career ==
Nguyen has worked on such titles as Jet with Dan Abnett, Wildcats v3.0 with Joe Casey, Batman with Judd Winick, Manifest Eternity with Scott Lobdell, and the latest revamp of The Authority, The Authority: Revolution, with Ed Brubaker. He was also the artist on a six-issue arc of Superman/Batman entitled "Torment", written by Alan Burnett.

Starting with issue #840, Nguyen became the regular ongoing artist on one of DC's flagship titles, Detective Comics, with writer Paul Dini. Their run lasted until issue #852, after which the pair launched Batman: Streets of Gotham, which lasted 21 issues and was cancelled in March 2011. In 2012, Nguyen collaborated with writer Scott Snyder on the miniseries American Vampire: Lord of Nightmares, which made the New York Times Best Seller list in 2013. He subsequently launched Batman: Li'l Gotham with co-writer Derek Fridolfs, an all ages series that was positively reviewed by Brian Truitt of USA Today. In rendering that series, Nguyen drew inspiration from the cartoons of the 1980s and '90s that he viewed in his childhood, explaining that in watching them, "you get this goofy view of the world."

In 2015, Jeff Lemire launched his creator-owned Image Comics series, Descender, with Nguyen as artist, for which Nguyen won the 2016 and 2019 Eisner Award for Best Painter/Multimedia Artist.

== Bibliography ==
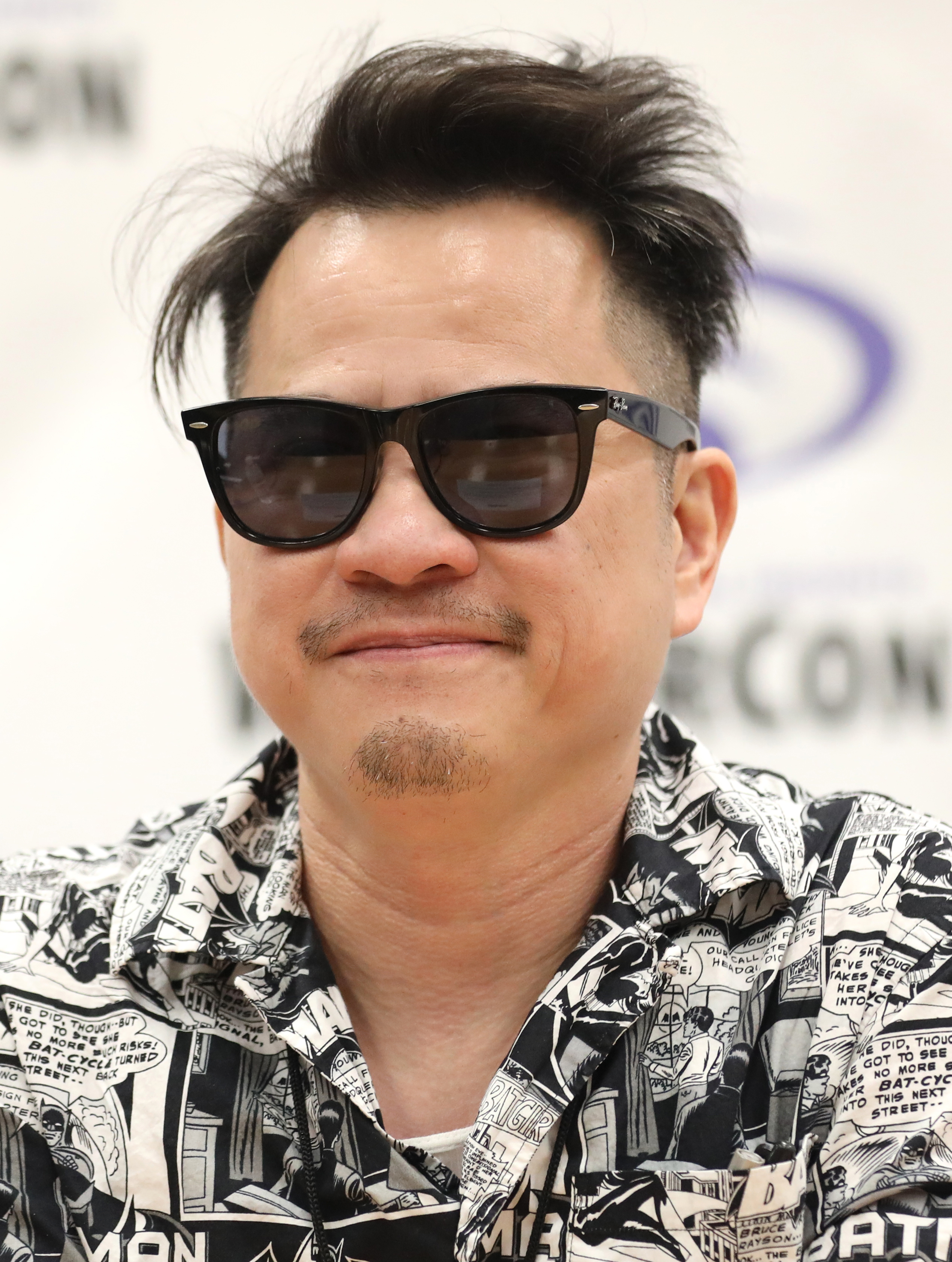
Nguyen at the 2024 WonderCon

=== Interior work ===
- Gen-Active #1-2, 6 (with Dan Abnett and Andy Lanning, Wildstorm, 2000)
- Wildstorm Thunderbook #1: "Family Matters" (with Dan Abnett and Andy Lanning, Wildstorm, 2000)
- Jet #1-4 (with Dan Abnett and Andy Lanning, Wildstorm, 2000–2001)
- Stray (with Scott Lobdell and Jimmy Palmiotti, graphic novel, Wildstorm, 2001)
- The Authority #23-26: "Transfer of Power" (with Tom Peyer, Wildstorm, 2001)
- Wildcats v3.0 #1-16 (with Joe Casey, Wildstorm, 2002–2004)
- Batman (DC Comics):
  - "As the Crow Flies" (with Judd Winick, in #626-630, 2004)
  - "Catspaw" (with Paul Dini, in #685, 2009)
  - "Off Rogue Racing, A Lil' Gotham Tale!" (script and art, with Derek Fridolfs, in Annual #27, 2009)
- The Authority: Revolution #1-12 (with Ed Brubaker, Wildstorm, 2004–2005)
- Vigilante #3: "Out of the Night" (with Bruce Jones, DC Comics, 2005)
- Manifest Eternity #1-6 (with Scott Lobdell, Wildstorm, 2006–2007)
- Superman/Batman #37-42: "Torment" (with Alan Burnett, DC Comics, 2007–2008)
- Detective Comics (DC Comics):
  - "Private Casebook" (with Paul Dini, in #840-845, 2008)
  - "Heart of Hush" (with Paul Dini, in #846-850, 2008–2009)
  - "Reconstruction" (with Paul Dini, in #852, 2009)
  - "Question & Answer, A Lil' Gotham Tale!" (script and art, with Derek Fridolfs, in Annual #11, 2009)
  - "The Medallion" (with Dennis O'Neil, in #866, 2010)
- Gotham Gazette #1-2: "The Veil" (with Fabian Nicieza, DC Comics, 2009)
- Batman: Streets of Gotham #1-14, 16-21 (with Paul Dini, DC Comics, 2009–2011)
- Batman and Robin #12: "Mexican Train" (with Grant Morrison and Andy Clarke, DC Comics, 2010)
- Batgirl #15-16, 18, 21 (with Bryan Q. Miller, DC Comics, 2011)
- Batman: Arkham City Special: "Hugo Strange" (with Paul Dini, among other artists, DC Comics, 2011)
- Batman: Gates of Gotham #4: "The Gotham City Massacre" (with Scott Snyder, Kyle Higgins, Graham Nolan and Derec Donovan, DC Comics, 2011)
- Batman Beyond Unlimited #1-10: "Justice League Unlimited" (script and art, with Derek Fridolfs, DC Comics, 2012–2013)
- Batwing #7-8 (with Judd Winick, DC Comics, 2012)
- American Vampire: Lord of Nightmares #1-5 (with Scott Snyder, Vertigo, 2012)
- Descender #1-32 (with Jeff Lemire, Image Comics, 2015-2018)
- Robin & Batman #1-3 (with Jeff Lemire, DC Comics, 2021-2022)

=== Cover work ===
- Gen-Active #4 (Wildstorm, 2001)
- ThunderCats: Dogs of War #2 (Wildstorm, 2003)
- Street Fighter #6 (Image, 2004)
- Wildcats v3.0 #17-24 (Wildstorm, 2004)
- Robin #129-131 (DC Comics, 2004)
- Batgirl v1 #63 (DC Comics, 2005)
- Welcome to Tranquility #3 (Wildstorm, 2007)
- Supernatural: Origins #4 (Wildstorm, 2007)
- Friday the 13th: Pamela's Tale #1-2 (Wildstorm, 2007)
- Necessary Evil #1 (Desperado, 2007)
- Friday the 13th: How I Spent My Summer Vacation #1 (Wildstorm, 2007)
- Countdown Presents: The Search for Ray Palmer — Gotham by Gaslight #1 (DC Comics, 2008)
- Supernatural: Rising Son #1, 3-6 (Wildstorm, 2008)
- DC/Wildstorm: DreamWar #4 (Wildstorm, 2008)
- Batman: Streets of Gotham #15 (DC Comics, 2009)
- Superman/Batman #65 (DC Comics, 2009)
- Superman: World of New Krypton #10 (DC Comics, 2009)
- Batman Beyond v3 #1-6 (DC Comics, 2010-2011)
- Telara Chronicles #0 (Wildstorm, 2010)
- Batman Beyond v4 #1-8 (DC Comics, 2011)
- Batgirl v3 #17, 19, 22-24 (DC Comics, 2011)
- Justice League: Generation Lost #14-16, 19-24 (DC Comics, 2011)
- Batman 80-Page Giant #1 (DC Comics, 2011)
- Gen^{13} #39 (Wildstorm, 2011)
- Superboy #3 (DC Comics, 2011)
- Superman 80-Page Giant #1 (DC Comics, 2011)
- Batman: Gates of Gotham #1-3, 5 (DC Comics, 2011)
- Superman Beyond #0 (DC Comics, 2011)
- Supernatural: The Dogs of Edinburgh #1-6 (DC Comics, 2011–2012)
- T.H.U.N.D.E.R. Agents v4 #3 (DC Comics, 2012)
- Batman v2 #7 (DC Comics, 2012)
- Ben 10 v3 #1 (Dynamite Entertainment, 2026)
