= Emi Lenox =

American cartoonist

- Areas: Cartoonist, Writer
- Notable works: "EmiTown" "Nowhere Men" "Plutona" "Black Hammer: Cthu-Louise"

Emi Lenox is an American cartoonist from Portland, Oregon. She is best known for EmiTown, an autobiographical webcomic that was later published in print by Image Comics. As an artist, she has worked with well-known comics creators such as Jeff Lemire (on Sweet Tooth) and Mike Allred (on Madman). Her most recent project, Plutona, is a collaboration with Lemire and Jordie Bellaire.

== Career ==
Emi Lenox began her comics career interning at Top Shelf Productions and Periscope Studio.

Lenox published two volumes of EmiTown with Image Comics. The first volume, originally published on January 4, 2011, is now on its second printing. The second volume was published on March 20, 2012. Lenox's two EmiTown volumes span 400-pages each of sketch diary entries from her day-to-day life in Portland, Oregon from the years 2008 to 2011. Her whimsical and occasionally serious drawings portray her life as she pursues her career in comics and meets with friends (as well as potential love interests). Lenox is still continuing to draw pages for EmiTown.

Lenox met well-known comic creator Jeff Lemire at a comic convention, where they first became friends. Plutona was a collaboration between them after working together on Lemire's Sweet Tooth. Lenox and Lemire co-wrote the Plutona story for the five-issue mini-series. Jordie Bellaire was brought on as their first choice for a colorist for Plutona. The story line in Plutona revolves around a group of kids who discover the dead body of a superhero, Plutona, while in the woods. Their relationships and identity are shaped by this experience in various ways. Plutona is a genre-bending comic that combines elements of superhero comics and character-driven dramas.

In 2016, Lenox was listed as a contributing artist on the notable series Nowhere Men, starting with issue #7. Her art first appears in short stories about Monica Strange presented in the form of Monica's diary entries. Lenox was chosen as the artist based on her previous sketch diary work in EmiTown. In an interview, creator Eric Stephenson noted, "Emi was my first and only choice, because I love her style. I’m a big fan of her own book, Emitown, and that was pretty much exactly what I wanted for Monica’s sketch diary."

In 2019, Lenox collaborated with Lemire again on the Eisner-nominated one-shot, Black Hammer: Chu-Louise.
