= Snow Angels (comic) =

- Cover of Snow Angels #1 (February 16, 2021). Art by Jock.

Publication information
- Publisher: comiXology (digital); Dark Horse Comics (print)
- Schedule: Monthly
- Format: Miniseries
- Genre: Science fiction
- Publication date: February 16 – November 30, 2021
- No. of issues: 10

Creative team
- Created by: Jeff Lemire; Jock
- Written by: Jeff Lemire
- Artist: Jock
- Letterer: Steve Wands
- Editor(s): Will Dennis; Tyler Jennes (assistant)

Collected editions
- Snow Angels – Volume 1: ISBN 9781506726489
- Snow Angels – Volume 2: ISBN 9781506726496

Snow Angels is a 10-part comic miniseries created by writer Jeff Lemire and artist Jock, published by comiXology. The series focuses on two girls, Milliken (age 12) and Mae (age eight), as they struggle to survive in a frozen wasteland, hunted by the mysterious "Snowman".

== Publication history ==
The series was originally teased in late October 2020 via various social media channels with a video revealing only the title of the project, the creators' names, and the publisher. A full announcement followed in mid November. The series debuted digitally as a part of the comiXology Originals line with Dark Horse Comics printing the book later. In tandem with the release of Snow Angels #1, Amazon released "Snow Angels: A Short Story", written by Lemire, on Kindle and Audible (narrated by Jennifer Ikeda).

Season One
Title	Release date	Medium
Snow Angels #1	February 16, 2021	Digital issue
Snow Angels #2	March 16, 2021	Digital issue
Snow Angels #3	April 20, 2021	Digital issue
Snow Angels #4	May 18, 2021	Digital issue
Snow Angels – Season One	June 22, 2021	Digital collection
Snow Angels – Volume 1	February 1, 2022	Trade paperback
Season Two
Title	Release date	Medium
Snow Angels – Season Two #1	June 22, 2021	Digital issue
Snow Angels – Season Two #2	July 20, 2021	Digital issue
Snow Angels – Season Two #3	August 17, 2021	Digital issue
Snow Angels – Season Two #4	September 21, 2021	Digital issue
Snow Angels – Season Two #5	October 2021	Digital issue
Snow Angels – Season Two #6	November 2021	Digital issue
Snow Angels – Season Two	February 1, 2022	Digital collection
Snow Angels – Volume 2	June 8, 2022	Trade paperback

== Reception ==
Many reviewers praised the first issue for its design and intriguing premise, though some criticized it as being overly familiar, especially in Adventures in Poor Taste's review. Over time, the reviews for the series trended upwards, with the central mystery commonly cited as a major part of the appeal. In 2022, Snow Angels was awarded the Eisner Award for Best Digital Comic.
