= Batman: Streets of Gotham =

American comic book series

- Variant incentive cover to Batman: Streets of Gotham #1, art by J. G. Jones.

Publication information
- Publisher: DC Comics
- Schedule: Monthly
- Format: Ongoing series
- Genre: Superhero
- Publication date: June 2009 – March 2011
- No. of issues: 21
- Main character(s): Dick Grayson/Batman; Damian Wayne/Robin; Commissioner Gordon

Creative team
- Written by: Paul Dini
- Penciller: Dustin Nguyen
- Inker: Derek Fridolfs
- Letterer: Steve Wands
- Colorist: John Kalisz
- Editor(s): Mike Marts; Janelle Siegel

Batman: Streets of Gotham is an American comic book written by Paul Dini, with art by Dustin Nguyen, published by the comic book publishing company DC Comics. The series stars Dick Grayson as the new Batman and ties into Grant Morrison's overarching "Batman: Reborn" story and the new Gotham City Sirens monthly. The series ran for 21 issues, from 2009 to 2011.

Streets of Gotham features Batman as the main character, but from a "street level" with other characters providing the main narrative. When asked about the style of Streets of Gotham, Batman group editor Mike Marts explained, "...these are Batman stories told through the point of view of other characters in Gotham City. So it could be Commissioner Gordon telling the story, it could be a villain, or it could be a supporting character telling the story".

The series also includes a Manhunter co-feature written by Marc Andreyko and illustrated by Georges Jeanty. The co-feature was replaced by another co-feature that spins-off of the end of the Manhunter one starring Two-Face. The same occurs with the Two-Face one ending and starting the Ragman co-feature.

== Tone and style ==
=== Main feature ===
In addition to Batman and Robin, the series follows a number of characters from the DC Universe, including Firefly, Hush, and Black Mask. The first arc follows Hush as he attempts to steal Bruce Wayne's identity, while Firefly, Black Mask, and others wreak havoc in the city. The writer Dini notes: "I've always liked that interpretation of Batman – you see him from the crooks' point of view, or you see him from an innocent person's point of view. So with this, it was 'Let's leave the Batcave behind, let's leave the alter ego behind, let's just do Batman and the effect he has on people'".

Chris Yost fills in for Paul Dini in a two-part story arc called "Leviathan" in which Huntress teams up with Man Bat to stop a ravaged priest who believes God is telling him to kill the two. The story drives away from the plot involving Victor Zsasz that Paul Dini was working on.

=== "Manhunter" backup strip ===
The series also contains a nine-page strip written by Marc Andreyko featuring the Manhunter. The story follows her arrival in Gotham as District Attorney. Writer Andreyko notes: "I think it's the smartest way to get new characters out there in people's minds, because with the economy being as horrible as it is, and with retailers having their choice of 300 Avengers books or 1500 Batman books or 1700 X-Men books, putting these backups in books that compliment [sic] each other, allows people to check these things out".

== Plot ==
At the beginning of the series. Judson Pierce and Sallie Guzzo swindle the Kane family out of their money. Pierce then tries to seduce Martha Kane, but is stopped by Thomas Wayne. In order to enact revenge, Pierce and Guzzo enlist the help of Doctor Death to try to destroy Martha Kane's clinic, their plot fails. Guzzo is apprehended by Roger Elliot, but saved by Pierce who shoots Elliot. Later Guzzo betrays Pierce and sends him into jail, for many years Pierce thinks of ways to enact revenge on the Wayne family. When he hears of Thomas and Martha Wayne's deaths, he decides to try to kill Bruce Wayne, their son.

Roger Elliot's wife then drives him to alcoholism because of her complaining about Judson Pierce having had shot him and him losing the Elliot family honour. This would lead to Roger beating his son Thomas, who would then try to kill his parents, eventually leading into him become the villain Hush.

Around the time Batman emerges, Guzzo is still a big player and goes to facilitate a deal with a new gangster, he calls for his nephew Tony Marchetti to come, Tony comes to find that a newly emerging Joker has hyenas eat Guzzo alive. This would eventually drive Tony Marchetti to try to get Judson Pierce freed so that after killing Bruce Wayne, they could kill the Joker.

Following the events of the storyline The Battle for the Cowl, Kate Spencer is appointed the new district attorney of Gotham City. She decides to investigate the death of the previous district attorney, believing Two-Face to have been framed. Before she can catch the murderer, Jane Doe, she is attacked by the murderer herself and overcome. Jane Doe strips Kate naked and begins to skin her alive but is electrocuted by the Huntress.

Meanwhile, Firefly begins to burn citizens of Gotham one he had burned the Black Mask's chip out of his head. Thomas Elliot, Hush, uses this to his advantage and escapes Wayne Manor. The Firefly attempts to kill the Black Mask but is stopped by Batman. The Black Mask is then saved from Robin by Victor Zsasz. Hush then begins to pose as Bruce Wayne, squandering Wayne's money until he is stopped by the Outsiders who put tabs on him.

As a reward for his loyalty, Victor Zsasz is given a briefcase of money by the Black Mask to torture people. Zsasz then starts kidnapping children and making them kill each other in an arena to raise money to get more kids to kill each other. Dick Grayson becomes Batman and gets information on Zsasz out of the Broker. Batman then apprehends Harley Quinn and tells her to get out of town and live a new life. On the other side of town, a girl named Katie is being sold until she is saved by a massive giant named Abuse.

Black Mask then [BSOG 5 Leviathan Part 1] has a man go invisible and produce terror throughout town. Man-Bat senses him with sonar and can see him, though nobody else can. Huntress pursues Man-Bat and the man is knocked out by a priest upon the arrival of Batman [BSOG 6 Leviathan Part 2]. Batman and Robin then [BSOG 7 In the Bleak Midwinter] further investigate the Zsasz murders by interrogating former-villains such as Humpty Dumpty. They are once again interrupted when Commissioner Gordon calls on Batman for investigation of rash murders [BSOG 8-9 Hardcore Nights Parts 1 & 2]. Colin Wilkes, a boy tortured by the Scarecrow using Bane's toxin, and Damian Wayne meet and are kidnapped by Zsasz' men [BSOG 10 The Heroes]. Colin uses Bane's toxin and transforms into Abuse and they fight Victor Zsasz who then falls into a pit upon Robin's self-defense [BSOG 11 Final Cut].

Kate then hunts down Two-Face and is about to kill him before being stopped by the timely arrival of Batman and Robin. During Jane Doe's trial, a fire occurs allowing Two-Face to escape, although Jane Doe manages to stay hidden. Hush, to humiliate the Batman family gets Jane Doe released from prison. Around the same time, Judson Pierce is released from Blackgate Prison. Bruce Wayne then returns and launches Batman Incorporated. Pierce kidnaps Hush, believing him to be Wayne, but Hush turns the tables on his captors and reveals that he is not Wayne.

Hush and his new "allies" recruit Doctor Death to their cause to kill Bruce Wayne and the real Bruce reconciles with Catwoman. With her, he combats a villain known as the Bedbug. Hush betrays Death, whose chems go off on Judson Pierce. Jane Doe then captures Hush, believing him to be Wayne, and cuts off his face. Hush is then rescued by Bruce and put into Arkham Asylum. Death's chemicals give Judson Pierce superhuman strength and he adopts the moniker Skel.

In Arkham Asylum, a doctor questions Hush and asks about Thomas Elliot. The series ends with a provoked Hush killing the doctor, even though guards are present and he is handcuffed. Arkham is then given a new nickname, the House of Hush.

Hush's story was continued in the comic book miniseries Batman: Gates of Gotham.

== Reception ==
IGN described the series as similar in tone to Ed Brubaker's Criminal, and that the focus on a more human angle makes "heroes seem larger than life, and is awe-inspiring".

Comic Book Resources noted with issue #3 that, "at this point, I think it's safe to say that Batman: Streets of Gotham isn't going to be that different of an approach to a Bat-title than any of the others".

=== Fill-in writers ===
Chris Yost acted as the first fill-in writer for Dini on issues #5-6, giving the fans a two-part story entitled "Leviathan". IGN stated issue #5 as being "odd and frustrating" while praising Nguyen's work. Mike Benson's work was treated much the same.

== Collected editions ==
- Batman: Streets of Gotham, Vol. 1 – Hush Money (collects issues #1–4, plus Detective Comics #852, Batman #685), May 2010, ISBN 978-1-4012-2721-0
- Batman: Streets of Gotham, Vol. 2 – Leviathan (collects issues #5–11), November 2010, ISBN 978-1-4012-2905-4
- Batman: Streets of Gotham, Vol. 3 – The House of Hush (collects issues #12-14, 16–21), August 2011, ISBN 978-1-4012-3129-3
- Manhunter: Face Off (cancelled by publisher; planned to collect "Manhunter" co-feature stories from issues #1–13), February 2011, ISBN 978-0-85768-008-2
