= The Underwater Welder =

2012 graphic novel ghost story by Jeff Lemire

- Date: 2012
- Page count: 232 pages
- Publisher: Top Shelf Productions

Creative team
- Writers: Jeff Lemire
- Artist: Jeff Lemire

Original publication
- Published in: Top Shelf Productions
- Date of publication: August 2012
- Language: English

The Underwater Welder is a graphic novel ghost story by Jeff Lemire, published in 2012 by Top Shelf Productions. The main character, Jack Joseph, is an offshore oil rig worker responsible for scuba-diving and repairing the rig. On shore, his wife is pregnant with their unborn son and Jack feels the pressure of impending fatherhood. On one dive, Jack encounters a supernatural presence at the bottom of the sea that puts him in contact with the ghost of his own father. The story explores themes dealing with the relationship between father and sons and memory and reality.

== Critical reception ==
Various critical websites hailed The Underwater Welder as one of the best graphic novels of 2012. Comic Book Resources, The A.V. Club, and ComicsAlliance listed the graphic novel in their "Best of 2012" lists.

== Film adaptation ==
In March 2017, Anonymous Content and Ryan Gosling announced that they will produce a film based on the graphic novel.
