= Sweet Tooth (Vertigo) =

Comic book series by Jeff Lemire

- Cover of Sweet Tooth 1 (November 2009), art by Jeff Lemire and Jose Villarrubia

Publication information
- Publisher: Vertigo/DC Black Label
- Schedule: Monthly
- Format: Ongoing series
- Genre: Post-apocalyptic
- Publication date: September 2009 – August 2021
- No. of issues: 46
- Main character(s): Gus; Jepperd

Creative team
- Created by: Jeff Lemire
- Written by: Jeff Lemire
- Artist: Jeff Lemire
- Letterer: Pat Brosseau
- Colorist: Jose Villarrubia
- Editor(s): Brandon Montclare; Bob Schreck

Collected editions
- Out of the Deep Woods: ISBN 1-4012-2696-5
- In Captivity: ISBN 1-4012-2854-2
- Animal Armies: ISBN 1-4012-3170-5
- Endangered Species: ISBN 1-4012-3361-9
- Unnatural Habitats: ISBN 1-4012-3723-1
- Wild Game: ISBN 1-4012-4029-1
- The Return: ISBN 1-77951-032-2

Sweet Tooth is an American comic book limited series written and drawn by Canadian cartoonist Jeff Lemire and published by DC Comics' Vertigo imprint. Dubbed by some as "Mad Max meets Bambi", it takes place in a mostly rural post-apocalyptic setting where some creatures are human/animal hybrids. The original 40-issue series of six sub-titled segments, ran from November 2009 to January 2013 (cover dates). A six-issue sequel, sub-titled The Return, ran from November 2020 to November 2021.

A television series adaptation was released on Netflix in June 2021, with a second season released in April 2023. The third and final season was released in June 2024.

== Plot summary ==
Gus, a young boy with deer-like features, lives a quiet life deep in the woods with his father. He learns many things, from medical care to religious prophecy. Though he loves his religious father, he yearns to escape as he learns there is no fire past the trees but simply more land.

Sometime after Gus's father passes away from an illness, a group of men come to kidnap him. They are slain by Jepperd, who then promises to take Gus to a sanctuary. Lonely, Gus goes with him. Along the way, they encounter many problems. Hybrid cultists almost kill Jepperd, but Gus saves him. 'Sweet Tooth' then earns his nickname by eating all of Jepperd's candy and food stash, though he had gained more food while Jepperd recovered. The duo also rescues several women from a prostitution ring.

Ultimately, Jepperd betrays Gus to a horrible scientific facility in return for the remains of his wife. It turns out a mysterious plague has been wiping out humanity, and the leader of the facility, Abbot, along with scientist Dr. Singh, believe the half-animal, half-human children hybrids have something to do with it. In flashback, it's revealed that Jepperd was a former hockey bruiser who protected his wife Louise in the post-apocalyptic world. Eventually, though, Louise reveals she is pregnant, and Jepperd relents when a militia led by Abbot offers protection. It was all a trick, however, with Abbot and Singh experimenting on pregnant women and hybrid babies to try to find a cure for the plague. Jepperd is kept in a cage but is eventually freed by Abbot's brother, Johnny, a guard in the facility. Johnny tells Jepperd his wife is dead, and Jepperd goes on a rampage through the facility. He is recaptured, and Abbot lets him out of the camp, telling him he can have his wife's remains if he brings Abbot a hybrid child. It is revealed that this is why Jepperd betrayed Gus, and he heads home to fulfill a promise to his wife that he would "bring her back home".

Despite the horrors, Gus makes friends with the last animal children at the place, the pig girl Wendy, half-feral groundhog boy Bobby, and the silent donkey boy Buddy. Gus is hypnotized by Dr Singh, who goes deep into his memory to find out the truth about his birth. He discovers that Gus's father was a lunatic and may even have been responsible for the apocalypse. He insists Abbot take him to the woods. They find a bible that Gus's father wrote, but no evidence of a mother in her grave; on the way back to the camp, Singh starts to believe the writings. Jepperd, overwhelmed with guilt and a directionless life, decides to re-rescue Gus. He recruits Becky and Lucy, the women he saved, and hundreds of hybrid cultists. With help from Johnny, the children escape, although Gus is forced to kill a lost alligator-child who had gone feral. While on the move, Jepperd and Gus share an identical dream about Alaska.

A battle and Johnny's intervention allow Jepperd and the women to escape with the children and Dr Singh, who insists on coming. Seemingly, Buddy is lost to the murderous attentions of the hybrid cultists, and at the same time, he seems to think Jepperd is his father. Despite the emotional turmoil, the group close ranks to protect the children still with them. Buddy is taken by Abbot, who murders the head cultist to do so. Somehow, the headmaster is now friendly and sympathetic toward the injured, moaning boy. Gus, Jepperd, Becky, Lucy, Wendy, Bobby, Johnny, and Singh stumble across a mysterious dam.

== Influence ==
Although the story is initially set in Nebraska, the landscape is inspired by Lemire's past home of Essex County, Ontario.

Sweet Tooth, as a post-apocalyptic parable, is rife with influences such as Tim Truman's Scout: War Shaman and the Winterworld three issue mini-series. As well as art influenced by Richard Corben's A Boy and His Dog written by Harlan Ellison and The Punisher: The End, written by Garth Ennis.

== Publication history ==
Twelve issues were slated for Sweet Tooth's first year (as part of Lemire's initial contract). Because the nature of monthly comics is dependent on sales, initially not even Jeff Lemire knew how many issues Sweet Tooth would run. Editor Brandon Montclare confirmed, "Sweet Tooth is taken down and rebuilt every issue—sometimes every page. And as far down the road as I can see, who knows where Gus' journey ends. Not even Jeff knows yet, although it's in his head somewhere." The main plot points were planned out with loosely 40 issues for DC/Vertigo, and in an interview for USA Today, Jeff Lemire was quoted: "right now, I have it planned out to be 20 to 30 issues, but it could go even further depending on the response it gets."

On May 7, 2012, Jeff Lemire announced that Sweet Tooth would be finishing with a double size special at #40. In January 2015, an 8-page Sweet Tooth short story titled Sweet Tooth: Black was published in Vertigo Quarterly: CMYK #4 Black. In August 2020, a sequel series subtitled The Return was announced, set 300 years later and following a cloned Gus, beginning publication in November 2020.

== Characters ==
- Gus — A 10-12-year-old hybrid deer boy with antlers, the first of a new breed of human/animal hybrid that appeared after an apocalyptic pandemic of an unknown virus. Raised alone by his religious father in a nature preserve in Nebraska, he decides to leave his forest home with Jepperd after his father dies of an unknown illness.
- Tommy Jepperd — A hulking, violent drifter who takes in Gus and promises to lead him to "The Preserve" (a fabled safe-haven for hybrid children). The character was based on an aged Frank Castle (Marvel's "The Punisher"). "Corben's aging gray-haired Frank is an unstoppable force of nature and amazing to behold. This character design ended up being a huge influence on the design of Jepperd, the big bad ass in Sweet Tooth."
- Dr. Singh — A scientist that experiments on hybrid Human/Animals. He takes special interest in Gus because his apparent age predates the pandemic.
- Wendy — A hybrid pig girl Gus meets in the militia camp. She seems to be around the same age as Gus. She was raised by a single mother, and takes to Lucy and Jepperd as mother and father figures.

== Issues ==
Issue	Release date	Story arc	Summary	Trade Paperback Collection	Hardcover Collection	Compendium
#1	September 2, 2009	Out of the Deep Woods	Gus, a young boy with deer-like features, meets drifter Jepperd after the boy's father passes away. Jepperd promises Gus he will bring him to "The Preserve," a safe haven for hybrid children such as himself.	Sweet Tooth – Volume 1: Out of the Deep Woods; May 18, 2010; ISBN 978-1-4012-2696-1	Sweet Tooth Deluxe Edition – Volume 1 September 2, 2015; ISBN 978-1-4012-5871-9	Sweet Tooth Compendium; July 27, 2021; ISBN 978-1-77951-024-2
#2	October 7, 2009	Out of the Deep Woods	Gus, a young boy with deer-like features, meets drifter Jepperd after the boy's father passes away. Jepperd promises Gus he will bring him to "The Preserve," a safe haven for hybrid children such as himself.	Sweet Tooth – Volume 1: Out of the Deep Woods; May 18, 2010; ISBN 978-1-4012-2696-1	Sweet Tooth Deluxe Edition – Volume 1 September 2, 2015; ISBN 978-1-4012-5871-9	Sweet Tooth Compendium; July 27, 2021; ISBN 978-1-77951-024-2
#3	November 4, 2009	Out of the Deep Woods	Gus, a young boy with deer-like features, meets drifter Jepperd after the boy's father passes away. Jepperd promises Gus he will bring him to "The Preserve," a safe haven for hybrid children such as himself.	Sweet Tooth – Volume 1: Out of the Deep Woods; May 18, 2010; ISBN 978-1-4012-2696-1	Sweet Tooth Deluxe Edition – Volume 1 September 2, 2015; ISBN 978-1-4012-5871-9	Sweet Tooth Compendium; July 27, 2021; ISBN 978-1-77951-024-2
#4	December 2, 2009	Out of the Deep Woods	Gus, a young boy with deer-like features, meets drifter Jepperd after the boy's father passes away. Jepperd promises Gus he will bring him to "The Preserve," a safe haven for hybrid children such as himself.	Sweet Tooth – Volume 1: Out of the Deep Woods; May 18, 2010; ISBN 978-1-4012-2696-1	Sweet Tooth Deluxe Edition – Volume 1 September 2, 2015; ISBN 978-1-4012-5871-9	Sweet Tooth Compendium; July 27, 2021; ISBN 978-1-77951-024-2
#5	January 6, 2010	Out of the Deep Woods	Gus, a young boy with deer-like features, meets drifter Jepperd after the boy's father passes away. Jepperd promises Gus he will bring him to "The Preserve," a safe haven for hybrid children such as himself.	Sweet Tooth – Volume 1: Out of the Deep Woods; May 18, 2010; ISBN 978-1-4012-2696-1	Sweet Tooth Deluxe Edition – Volume 1 September 2, 2015; ISBN 978-1-4012-5871-9	Sweet Tooth Compendium; July 27, 2021; ISBN 978-1-77951-024-2
#6	February 3, 2010	In Captivity	Gus finally meets other hybrids. Gus, now parted from Jepperd, sees the horrors of being a hybrid and why his father wanted to protect him. Jepperd, away from Gus, reflects on his life choices.	Sweet Tooth – Volume 2: In Captivity; December 14, 2010; ISBN 978-1-4012-2854-5	Sweet Tooth Deluxe Edition – Volume 1 September 2, 2015; ISBN 978-1-4012-5871-9	Sweet Tooth Compendium; July 27, 2021; ISBN 978-1-77951-024-2
#7	March 3, 2010	In Captivity	Gus finally meets other hybrids. Gus, now parted from Jepperd, sees the horrors of being a hybrid and why his father wanted to protect him. Jepperd, away from Gus, reflects on his life choices.	Sweet Tooth – Volume 2: In Captivity; December 14, 2010; ISBN 978-1-4012-2854-5	Sweet Tooth Deluxe Edition – Volume 1 September 2, 2015; ISBN 978-1-4012-5871-9	Sweet Tooth Compendium; July 27, 2021; ISBN 978-1-77951-024-2
#8	April 7, 2010	In Captivity	Gus finally meets other hybrids. Gus, now parted from Jepperd, sees the horrors of being a hybrid and why his father wanted to protect him. Jepperd, away from Gus, reflects on his life choices.	Sweet Tooth – Volume 2: In Captivity; December 14, 2010; ISBN 978-1-4012-2854-5	Sweet Tooth Deluxe Edition – Volume 1 September 2, 2015; ISBN 978-1-4012-5871-9	Sweet Tooth Compendium; July 27, 2021; ISBN 978-1-77951-024-2
#9	May 5, 2010	In Captivity	Gus finally meets other hybrids. Gus, now parted from Jepperd, sees the horrors of being a hybrid and why his father wanted to protect him. Jepperd, away from Gus, reflects on his life choices.	Sweet Tooth – Volume 2: In Captivity; December 14, 2010; ISBN 978-1-4012-2854-5	Sweet Tooth Deluxe Edition – Volume 1 September 2, 2015; ISBN 978-1-4012-5871-9	Sweet Tooth Compendium; July 27, 2021; ISBN 978-1-77951-024-2
#10	June 2, 2010	In Captivity	Gus finally meets other hybrids. Gus, now parted from Jepperd, sees the horrors of being a hybrid and why his father wanted to protect him. Jepperd, away from Gus, reflects on his life choices.	Sweet Tooth – Volume 2: In Captivity; December 14, 2010; ISBN 978-1-4012-2854-5	Sweet Tooth Deluxe Edition – Volume 1 September 2, 2015; ISBN 978-1-4012-5871-9	Sweet Tooth Compendium; July 27, 2021; ISBN 978-1-77951-024-2
#11	July 7, 2010	In Captivity	Gus finally meets other hybrids. Gus, now parted from Jepperd, sees the horrors of being a hybrid and why his father wanted to protect him. Jepperd, away from Gus, reflects on his life choices.	Sweet Tooth – Volume 2: In Captivity; December 14, 2010; ISBN 978-1-4012-2854-5	Sweet Tooth Deluxe Edition – Volume 1 September 2, 2015; ISBN 978-1-4012-5871-9	Sweet Tooth Compendium; July 27, 2021; ISBN 978-1-77951-024-2
#12	August 4, 2010	The Singh Tapes	Dr. Singh recounts the events of the plague. We see a day in the life of Gus in the militia camp.	Sweet Tooth – Volume 3: Animal Armies; June 8, 2011; ISBN 978-1-4012-3170-5	Sweet Tooth Deluxe Edition – Volume 1 September 2, 2015; ISBN 978-1-4012-5871-9	Sweet Tooth Compendium; July 27, 2021; ISBN 978-1-77951-024-2
#13	September 1, 2010	Animal Armies	The hybrids try to escape from the militia compound. In this third volume, Jepperd begins to form an army to topple the militia camp so he can rescue Gus and the other hybrid kids.	Sweet Tooth – Volume 3: Animal Armies; June 8, 2011; ISBN 978-1-4012-3170-5	Sweet Tooth Deluxe Edition – Volume 2 April 6, 2016; ISBN 978-1-4012-6146-7	Sweet Tooth Compendium; July 27, 2021; ISBN 978-1-77951-024-2
#14	October 6, 2010	Animal Armies	The hybrids try to escape from the militia compound. In this third volume, Jepperd begins to form an army to topple the militia camp so he can rescue Gus and the other hybrid kids.	Sweet Tooth – Volume 3: Animal Armies; June 8, 2011; ISBN 978-1-4012-3170-5	Sweet Tooth Deluxe Edition – Volume 2 April 6, 2016; ISBN 978-1-4012-6146-7	Sweet Tooth Compendium; July 27, 2021; ISBN 978-1-77951-024-2
#15	November 3, 2010	Animal Armies	The hybrids try to escape from the militia compound. In this third volume, Jepperd begins to form an army to topple the militia camp so he can rescue Gus and the other hybrid kids.	Sweet Tooth – Volume 3: Animal Armies; June 8, 2011; ISBN 978-1-4012-3170-5	Sweet Tooth Deluxe Edition – Volume 2 April 6, 2016; ISBN 978-1-4012-6146-7	Sweet Tooth Compendium; July 27, 2021; ISBN 978-1-77951-024-2
#16	December 1, 2010	Animal Armies	The hybrids try to escape from the militia compound. In this third volume, Jepperd begins to form an army to topple the militia camp so he can rescue Gus and the other hybrid kids.	Sweet Tooth – Volume 3: Animal Armies; June 8, 2011; ISBN 978-1-4012-3170-5	Sweet Tooth Deluxe Edition – Volume 2 April 6, 2016; ISBN 978-1-4012-6146-7	Sweet Tooth Compendium; July 27, 2021; ISBN 978-1-77951-024-2
#17	January 5, 2011	Animal Armies	The hybrids try to escape from the militia compound. In this third volume, Jepperd begins to form an army to topple the militia camp so he can rescue Gus and the other hybrid kids.	Sweet Tooth – Volume 3: Animal Armies; June 8, 2011; ISBN 978-1-4012-3170-5	Sweet Tooth Deluxe Edition – Volume 2 April 6, 2016; ISBN 978-1-4012-6146-7	Sweet Tooth Compendium; July 27, 2021; ISBN 978-1-77951-024-2
#18	February 2, 2011	The Further Adventures of The Boy and The Big Man	Gus and company explore a mall.: This issue is presented in landscape format	Sweet Tooth – Volume 4: Endangered Species; January 31, 2012; ISBN 978-1-4012-3361-7	Sweet Tooth Deluxe Edition – Volume 2 April 6, 2016; ISBN 978-1-4012-6146-7	Sweet Tooth Compendium; July 27, 2021; ISBN 978-1-77951-024-2
#19	March 2, 2011	Endangered Species	Gus reluctantly joins Jepperd on missing persons hunt, but the tension between the two continues to grow. Meanwhile, Singh and Johnny come face to face with a deadly new threat, and Lucy and the girls meet Walter Fish, an enigmatic survivor who may have more to offer than meets the eye.: Sweet Tooth #19 featuring art by Matt Kindt, Emi Lenox, and Nate Powell	Sweet Tooth – Volume 4: Endangered Species; January 31, 2012; ISBN 978-1-4012-3361-7	Sweet Tooth Deluxe Edition – Volume 2 April 6, 2016; ISBN 978-1-4012-6146-7	Sweet Tooth Compendium; July 27, 2021; ISBN 978-1-77951-024-2
#20	April 6, 2011	Endangered Species	Gus reluctantly joins Jepperd on missing persons hunt, but the tension between the two continues to grow. Meanwhile, Singh and Johnny come face to face with a deadly new threat, and Lucy and the girls meet Walter Fish, an enigmatic survivor who may have more to offer than meets the eye.: Sweet Tooth #19 featuring art by Matt Kindt, Emi Lenox, and Nate Powell	Sweet Tooth – Volume 4: Endangered Species; January 31, 2012; ISBN 978-1-4012-3361-7	Sweet Tooth Deluxe Edition – Volume 2 April 6, 2016; ISBN 978-1-4012-6146-7	Sweet Tooth Compendium; July 27, 2021; ISBN 978-1-77951-024-2
#21	May 4, 2011	Endangered Species	Gus reluctantly joins Jepperd on missing persons hunt, but the tension between the two continues to grow. Meanwhile, Singh and Johnny come face to face with a deadly new threat, and Lucy and the girls meet Walter Fish, an enigmatic survivor who may have more to offer than meets the eye.: Sweet Tooth #19 featuring art by Matt Kindt, Emi Lenox, and Nate Powell	Sweet Tooth – Volume 4: Endangered Species; January 31, 2012; ISBN 978-1-4012-3361-7	Sweet Tooth Deluxe Edition – Volume 2 April 6, 2016; ISBN 978-1-4012-6146-7	Sweet Tooth Compendium; July 27, 2021; ISBN 978-1-77951-024-2
#22	June 1, 2011	Endangered Species	Gus reluctantly joins Jepperd on missing persons hunt, but the tension between the two continues to grow. Meanwhile, Singh and Johnny come face to face with a deadly new threat, and Lucy and the girls meet Walter Fish, an enigmatic survivor who may have more to offer than meets the eye.: Sweet Tooth #19 featuring art by Matt Kindt, Emi Lenox, and Nate Powell	Sweet Tooth – Volume 4: Endangered Species; January 31, 2012; ISBN 978-1-4012-3361-7	Sweet Tooth Deluxe Edition – Volume 2 April 6, 2016; ISBN 978-1-4012-6146-7	Sweet Tooth Compendium; July 27, 2021; ISBN 978-1-77951-024-2
#23	July 6, 2011	Endangered Species	Gus reluctantly joins Jepperd on missing persons hunt, but the tension between the two continues to grow. Meanwhile, Singh and Johnny come face to face with a deadly new threat, and Lucy and the girls meet Walter Fish, an enigmatic survivor who may have more to offer than meets the eye.: Sweet Tooth #19 featuring art by Matt Kindt, Emi Lenox, and Nate Powell	Sweet Tooth – Volume 4: Endangered Species; January 31, 2012; ISBN 978-1-4012-3361-7	Sweet Tooth Deluxe Edition – Volume 2 April 6, 2016; ISBN 978-1-4012-6146-7	Sweet Tooth Compendium; July 27, 2021; ISBN 978-1-77951-024-2
#24	August 3, 2011	Endangered Species	Gus reluctantly joins Jepperd on missing persons hunt, but the tension between the two continues to grow. Meanwhile, Singh and Johnny come face to face with a deadly new threat, and Lucy and the girls meet Walter Fish, an enigmatic survivor who may have more to offer than meets the eye.: Sweet Tooth #19 featuring art by Matt Kindt, Emi Lenox, and Nate Powell	Sweet Tooth – Volume 4: Endangered Species; January 31, 2012; ISBN 978-1-4012-3361-7	Sweet Tooth Deluxe Edition – Volume 2 April 6, 2016; ISBN 978-1-4012-6146-7	Sweet Tooth Compendium; July 27, 2021; ISBN 978-1-77951-024-2
#25	September 7, 2011	Endangered Species	Gus reluctantly joins Jepperd on missing persons hunt, but the tension between the two continues to grow. Meanwhile, Singh and Johnny come face to face with a deadly new threat, and Lucy and the girls meet Walter Fish, an enigmatic survivor who may have more to offer than meets the eye.: Sweet Tooth #19 featuring art by Matt Kindt, Emi Lenox, and Nate Powell	Sweet Tooth – Volume 4: Endangered Species; January 31, 2012; ISBN 978-1-4012-3361-7	Sweet Tooth Deluxe Edition – Volume 2 April 6, 2016; ISBN 978-1-4012-6146-7	Sweet Tooth Compendium; July 27, 2021; ISBN 978-1-77951-024-2
#26	October 5, 2011	The Taxidermist	As the mysterious Captain James Thacker and his crew man a deadly expedition, they will uncover secrets centuries old.: Art by Matt Kindt	Sweet Tooth – Volume 5: Unnatural Habitats; January 31, 2012; ISBN 978-1-4012-3723-3	Sweet Tooth Deluxe Edition – Volume 3 November 29, 2016; ISBN 978-1-4012-6739-1	Sweet Tooth Compendium; July 27, 2021; ISBN 978-1-77951-024-2
#27	November 2, 2011	The Taxidermist	As the mysterious Captain James Thacker and his crew man a deadly expedition, they will uncover secrets centuries old.: Art by Matt Kindt	Sweet Tooth – Volume 5: Unnatural Habitats; January 31, 2012; ISBN 978-1-4012-3723-3	Sweet Tooth Deluxe Edition – Volume 3 November 29, 2016; ISBN 978-1-4012-6739-1	Sweet Tooth Compendium; July 27, 2021; ISBN 978-1-77951-024-2
#28	December 7, 2011	The Taxidermist	As the mysterious Captain James Thacker and his crew man a deadly expedition, they will uncover secrets centuries old.: Art by Matt Kindt	Sweet Tooth – Volume 5: Unnatural Habitats; January 31, 2012; ISBN 978-1-4012-3723-3	Sweet Tooth Deluxe Edition – Volume 3 November 29, 2016; ISBN 978-1-4012-6739-1	Sweet Tooth Compendium; July 27, 2021; ISBN 978-1-77951-024-2
#29	January 4, 2012	Unnatural Habitats	As Jepperd, Singh and Gus make plans to head to Alaska, things start to deteriorate for the rest of the group back at the sanctuary.	Sweet Tooth – Volume 5: Unnatural Habitats; January 31, 2012; ISBN 978-1-4012-3723-3	Sweet Tooth Deluxe Edition – Volume 3 November 29, 2016; ISBN 978-1-4012-6739-1	Sweet Tooth Compendium; July 27, 2021; ISBN 978-1-77951-024-2
#30	February 1, 2012	Unnatural Habitats	As Jepperd, Singh and Gus make plans to head to Alaska, things start to deteriorate for the rest of the group back at the sanctuary.	Sweet Tooth – Volume 5: Unnatural Habitats; January 31, 2012; ISBN 978-1-4012-3723-3	Sweet Tooth Deluxe Edition – Volume 3 November 29, 2016; ISBN 978-1-4012-6739-1	Sweet Tooth Compendium; July 27, 2021; ISBN 978-1-77951-024-2
#31	March 7, 2012	Unnatural Habitats	As Jepperd, Singh and Gus make plans to head to Alaska, things start to deteriorate for the rest of the group back at the sanctuary.	Sweet Tooth – Volume 5: Unnatural Habitats; January 31, 2012; ISBN 978-1-4012-3723-3	Sweet Tooth Deluxe Edition – Volume 3 November 29, 2016; ISBN 978-1-4012-6739-1	Sweet Tooth Compendium; July 27, 2021; ISBN 978-1-77951-024-2
#32	April 4, 2012	Unnatural Habitats	As Jepperd, Singh and Gus make plans to head to Alaska, things start to deteriorate for the rest of the group back at the sanctuary.	Sweet Tooth – Volume 5: Unnatural Habitats; January 31, 2012; ISBN 978-1-4012-3723-3	Sweet Tooth Deluxe Edition – Volume 3 November 29, 2016; ISBN 978-1-4012-6739-1	Sweet Tooth Compendium; July 27, 2021; ISBN 978-1-77951-024-2
#33	May 2, 2012	The Continuing Adventures of The Boy and The Big Man	Gus and company mourn the passing of Lucy.: This issue is presented in landscape format	Sweet Tooth – Volume 6: Wild Game; June 25, 2013; ISBN 978-1-4012-4029-5	Sweet Tooth Deluxe Edition – Volume 3 November 29, 2016; ISBN 978-1-4012-6739-1	Sweet Tooth Compendium; July 27, 2021; ISBN 978-1-77951-024-2
#34	June 6, 2012	The Ballad of Johnny and Abbot	The brothers come to an impasse.: Featuring art by Nate Powell	Sweet Tooth – Volume 6: Wild Game; June 25, 2013; ISBN 978-1-4012-4029-5	Sweet Tooth Deluxe Edition – Volume 3 November 29, 2016; ISBN 978-1-4012-6739-1	Sweet Tooth Compendium; July 27, 2021; ISBN 978-1-77951-024-2
#35	July 4, 2012	The Singh Tapes – Vol. 3: Alaska	Dr. Singh arrives in Alaska and uncovers the origins of Gus and the hybrid children and the cause of the plague that decimated the world.	Sweet Tooth – Volume 6: Wild Game; June 25, 2013; ISBN 978-1-4012-4029-5	Sweet Tooth Deluxe Edition – Volume 3 November 29, 2016; ISBN 978-1-4012-6739-1	Sweet Tooth Compendium; July 27, 2021; ISBN 978-1-77951-024-2
#36	August 1, 2012	Wild Game	The militia arrives in Alaska, and Gus and Jepperd deal with the truth of Gus's origins.	Sweet Tooth – Volume 6: Wild Game; June 25, 2013; ISBN 978-1-4012-4029-5	Sweet Tooth Deluxe Edition – Volume 3 November 29, 2016; ISBN 978-1-4012-6739-1	Sweet Tooth Compendium; July 27, 2021; ISBN 978-1-77951-024-2
#37	September 5, 2012	Wild Game	The militia arrives in Alaska, and Gus and Jepperd deal with the truth of Gus's origins.	Sweet Tooth – Volume 6: Wild Game; June 25, 2013; ISBN 978-1-4012-4029-5	Sweet Tooth Deluxe Edition – Volume 3 November 29, 2016; ISBN 978-1-4012-6739-1	Sweet Tooth Compendium; July 27, 2021; ISBN 978-1-77951-024-2
#38	October 3, 2012	Wild Game	The militia arrives in Alaska, and Gus and Jepperd deal with the truth of Gus's origins.	Sweet Tooth – Volume 6: Wild Game; June 25, 2013; ISBN 978-1-4012-4029-5	Sweet Tooth Deluxe Edition – Volume 3 November 29, 2016; ISBN 978-1-4012-6739-1	Sweet Tooth Compendium; July 27, 2021; ISBN 978-1-77951-024-2
#39	November 7, 2012	Wild Game	The militia arrives in Alaska, and Gus and Jepperd deal with the truth of Gus's origins.	Sweet Tooth – Volume 6: Wild Game; June 25, 2013; ISBN 978-1-4012-4029-5	Sweet Tooth Deluxe Edition – Volume 3 November 29, 2016; ISBN 978-1-4012-6739-1	Sweet Tooth Compendium; July 27, 2021; ISBN 978-1-77951-024-2
#40	January 9, 2013	Home Sweet Home	An epilogue showing the passage of the humans into extinction and the rise of the hybrids.	Sweet Tooth – Volume 6: Wild Game; June 25, 2013; ISBN 978-1-4012-4029-5	Sweet Tooth Deluxe Edition – Volume 3 November 29, 2016; ISBN 978-1-4012-6739-1	Sweet Tooth Compendium; July 27, 2021; ISBN 978-1-77951-024-2
#1	November 3, 2020	The Return	Once upon a time there was a little boy named Gus. He had antlers and lived with his father in a little cabin in the woods. Then his father died, and the big man with cold eyes took Gus away. Gus went on many great adventures, found friends, love, happiness, family, and acceptance. Now, years later…it begins again. A young boy with antlers and deer-like feature wakes in a bizarre and completely foreign world where the last humans struggle to survive. They tell the boy he is special, he is chosen, and that he alone can lead them back to a world dominated by the oppressive Hybrids.	Sweet Tooth – Volume 7: The Return; August 17, 2021; ISBN 978-1-77951-032-7	TBA	
#2	December 8, 2020	The Return	Father is not very happy with the boy. The boy should have listened to Father. Surely, every boy needs to play, run, and be wild…but the boy can never be free…not really. Now the boy has done something quite bad and made Father very unhappy. Go to your room, young man! But the rooms here are very small, and dark, and cold, and the boy is not very happy in them. No one is happy. But sometimes, even from a bad time, something special and unexpected can blossom.	Sweet Tooth – Volume 7: The Return; August 17, 2021; ISBN 978-1-77951-032-7	TBA	
#3	January 12, 2021	The Return	Oh no, oh no! Things are even worse now! Father told the boy and Penny to go to the jail cell for a time out, but now it looks like they have escaped! And what's this? One of Father's nannies has gone missing too? And the Downsiders are angry with Father? Oh dear, this simply will not do. Not one bit. The people must be put back in their places. Order must be maintained. Otherwise humanity cannot survive. Will Penny and the boy ruin Father's perfect plans, or will he have to put an end to the meddlesome children?	Sweet Tooth – Volume 7: The Return; August 17, 2021; ISBN 978-1-77951-032-7	TBA	
#4	February 9, 2021	The Return	Rejoice! For at long last the tale of the Boy's miraculous birth is revealed. A savior born of holiness and science! Truly, such a feat could only be conducted by one as holy as Father. Behold! As the stage is set for the final confrontation between man and the abhorrent hybrid beasts that walk the earth! Praise! For out of nothing Father has birthed a savior: the Boy.	Sweet Tooth – Volume 7: The Return; August 17, 2021; ISBN 978-1-77951-032-7	TBA	
#5	March 9, 2021	The Return	The clock is tick-tick-ticking down. Soon all the nasty hybrid beasts that roam the Earth will get sick and die. And it's all thanks to our beloved Father and his incredible science virus! He's doing it for all of you, because Father loves you very much, and soon you and all his other very good, special friends will get to walk upon the desiccated corpses of the villainous creatures that took our home from us! What a joyous time that will be! What's that? Oh my! It's almost time! Let's pack our bags, brush our teeth, and remember to never lie to Father! Because lying is what a hybrid would do, and you're much better than one of them, right?	Sweet Tooth – Volume 7: The Return; August 17, 2021; ISBN 978-1-77951-032-7	TBA	
#6	April 13, 2021	The Return	Once upon a time a young boy with antlers lived in a little house under the earth. He had a father and two nannies. They raised him to be good and to obey their every command. They said they loved the boy, and maybe some of them did, but Father? Well, he only loved himself. Father says the boy is a weapon against those who stand in opposition to humanity, while the rebellious Undersider dissidents believe the child to be the second coming of a mythological savior from the past. Haunted by dreamlike memories of a life he never lived and hunted by the man who created him, the boy must choose what and who he will be, and bring this chapter of his life to a close.	Sweet Tooth – Volume 7: The Return; August 17, 2021; ISBN 978-1-77951-032-7	TBA	

Other Sweet Tooth stories:

- Sweet Tooth: Black (8-page short story) in: Vertigo Quarterly CMYK #4 (anthology, 2015) collected in CMYK (tpb, 296 pages, 2015, ISBN 1-4012-5336-9)

== Television series adaptation ==
On November 16, 2018, it was announced that streaming service Hulu had given a pilot order to a potential television series adaptation of the comic book series. The pilot was written and directed by Jim Mickle who also executive produced alongside Robert Downey Jr., Susan Downey, Amanda Burrell, and Linda Moran. Production companies involved with the pilot are Team Downey and Warner Bros. Television. On April 9, 2020, it was announced that the series has been moved from Hulu to Netflix. On May 12, 2020, Netflix had given the production a series order for a first season consisting of eight episodes and starring Nonso Anozie as Tommy Jeppard, Christian Convery as Sweet Tooth/Gus, and narrated by James Brolin. Sweet Tooth premiered on June 4, 2021.
