= Essex County Trilogy =

2008 graphic novel collection

- Date: 2008
- Main characters: Lester, Lou LeBeuf, Anne Quenneville, Uncle Ken
- Series: Tales From the Farm, Ghost Stories, The Country Nurse
- Publisher: Top Shelf Productions

Creative team
- Writers: Jeff Lemire
- Artist: Jeff Lemire

Original publication
- Published in: Top Shelf Productions
- Issues: "Tales From the Farm" "Ghost Stories" "The Country Nurse"
- Date of publication: 2008, 2009, 2011
- Language: English
- ISBN: 978-1603090384

Essex County Trilogy is a collection of three graphic short stories set in Essex County, Ontario by Jeff Lemire published in 2011 by Top Shelf Productions. The three short stories are "Tales from the Farm" (2008), "Ghost Stories" (2008), and "The Country Nurse" (2009). Two other shorter stories titled "The Essex County Boxing Club" and "The Sad and Lonely Life of Eddie Elephant Ears" are also included.

The collection won the Alex Award, the Doug Wright Award, and the Joe Shuster Award. It was also a 2011 selection for Canada Reads: The Essential Canadian Novels of the Decade. In addition, Essex County provided Jeff Lemire with a Harvey Award nomination for Best New Talent in 2008.

== Publication order ==
- Vol 1: Tales From the Farm (2008)
- Vol 2: Ghost Stories (2008)
- "Essex County Boxing Club" (short) (2008)
- Vol 3: The Country Nurse (2009)
- "The Sad and Lonely Life of Eddie Elephant-Ears" (2011)
- Essex County (Hardcover) (2011)
- Essex County (Paperback) (2011)

== Adaptations ==
In June 2011, it was announced that visual effects artist John Dykstra would direct an adaptation of Essex County entitled Super Zero.

In December 2015, it was announced that First Generation Films had optioned the rights to Essex County to develop the graphic novel as a television series for Canada's CBC Television. Aaron Martin is set as writer and showrunner, as well as executive producing with Lemire. The television adaptation, Essex County, premiered on CBC Television in March 2023.

== Reception ==
Awards for the Essex County series
Award	Year	Recipient	Result
CBC Canada Reads for People's Choice	2011	Series	Winner
Joe Shuster Award for Cartoonist	2008	Jeff Lemire	Winner
Doug Wright Award for Best Emerging Talent	2008	Jeff Lemire	Winner
YALSA Alex Awards	2008	Volume 1: Tales from the Farm	Top Ten
