= DC Black Label =

Imprint of DC comics

- Parent company: DC Comics
- Status: Active
- Predecessor: Vertigo Comics
- Founded: 2018; 8 years ago
- Country of origin: United States
- Headquarters location: New York City
- Publication types: Comic books
- Fiction genres: Superhero
- Owner: Skydance Corporation

DC Black Label (also referred to simply as Black Label) is an imprint of American comic book publisher DC Comics consisting of original miniseries and reprints of books previously published under other imprints. The imprint intends to present traditional DC Universe characters for a mature audience with stand-alone Prestige Format series. The first title of the imprint, Batman: Damned, was released on September 19, 2018.

== Publication history ==
Single issues of comic books that are issued under the Black Label line will be published in Prestige Format. If a comic book series exceeds a miniseries run length, it will be published in standard format. All series are eventually collected in hardcover format.

Black Label was launched in September 2018. Black Label is designed for writers and artists to create more adult oriented stories, without having to follow the rules of continuity and age ratings.

With the discontinuation of DC's Vertigo imprint, new and current series, as well as reprints of old titles, are being published under the DC Black Label imprint beginning in 2020. Some series reprinted include The Sandman, Fables, Y: The Last Man, The Sleeper, Sweet Tooth, Animal Man, Doom Patrol, Swamp Thing, Watchmen, IZombie, etc. Continuations of Vertigo series are published under the Black Label line, such as Sweet Tooth: The Return and Fables #151 - 162.

== Series and continuity ==
Many series released by DC Black Label focus on characters from the DC Universe, with stories described as darker or more mature, or reinventions of existing characters.

Geoff Johns said that the Black Label stories do not always have to exist outside of the main universe canon. Stories which may not intentionally exist within the main universe upon release can be folded into the main universe dependant on their success or popularity.

Tom King, speaking on the topic of continuity with mainline DC, has said that there are three major categories, based on DC published during the 1980s. Comics in one category have nothing to do with the DC Universe. In the second category are stories which could exist in hypothetical futures of mainstream continuity, such as The Dark Knight Returns. In the third category are stories like The Killing Joke, which may occur within the DCU, and therefore impact it, but aren't occurring at the same point in the timeline as the routine publishing continuity.

== Titles ==
Comic books
Title	Issues	Publication date	Writer	Artist	Ref.
Released
Batman: Damned	#1–3	September 19, 2018 – June 26, 2019	Brian Azzarello	Lee Bermejo	
Superman: Year One	#1–3	June 19, 2019 – October 16, 2019	Frank Miller	John Romita Jr.	
Dark Knight Returns: The Golden Child	#1	December 11, 2019	Frank Miller	Rafael Grampá	
Harleen	#1–3	September 25, 2019 – December 18, 2019	Stjepan Šejić		
Batman: Last Knight on Earth	#1–3	May 29, 2019 – December 18, 2019	Scott Snyder	Greg Capullo	
Joker: Killer Smile	#1–3	October 30, 2019 – February 19, 2020	Jeff Lemire	Andrea Sorrentino	
Birds of Prey	#1	June 2, 2020	Brian Azzarello	Emanuela Lupacchino	
The Last God: Tales from the Book of Ages	#1	June 2, 2020	Phillip Kennedy Johnson	Riccardo Federici	
Batman: The Smile Killer	#1	June 24, 2020	Jeff Lemire	Andrea Sorrentino	
Joker/Harley: Criminal Sanity - Secret Files	#1	July 21, 2020	Kami Garcia; Ed Kurz	David Mack; Jason Badower	
Wonder Woman: Dead Earth	#1–4	December 18, 2019 – August 18, 2020	Daniel Warren Johnson		
The Question: The Deaths of Vic Sage	#1–4	November 20, 2019 – August 25, 2020	Jeff Lemire	Denys Cowan	
The Last God: Songs of Lost Children	#1	September 22, 2020	Dan Watters	Steve Beach	
Batman: Three Jokers	#1–3	August 25, 2020 – October 27, 2020	Geoff Johns	Jason Fabok	
The Last God	#1–12	October 30, 2019 – January 26, 2021	Phillip Kennedy Johnson	Riccardo Federici	
Harley Quinn and the Birds of Prey	#1–4	February 12, 2020 – February 2, 2021	Amanda Conner; Jimmy Palmiotti	Arthur Adams	
Hellblazer: Rise and Fall	#1–3	September 2, 2020 – February 2, 2021	Tom Taylor	Darick Robertson	
Joker/Harley: Criminal Sanity	#1–8	October 9, 2019 – April 7, 2021	Kami Garcia	Mike Mayhew; Mico Suayan	
Sweet Tooth: The Return	#1–6	November 3, 2020 – April 13, 2021	Jeff Lemire		
The Other History of the DC Universe	#1–5	November 24, 2020 – July 27, 2021	John Ridley	Giuseppe Camuncoli	
American Vampire 1976	#1–10	October 6, 2020 – August 3, 2021	Scott Snyder	Rafael Albuquerque	
Rorschach	#1–12	October 13, 2020 – September 14, 2021	Tom King	Jorge Fornés	
Strange Adventures	#1–12	March 4, 2020 – October 12, 2021	Tom King	Mitch Gerads; Evan "Doc" Shaner	
Batman: Reptilian	#1–6	June 22, 2021 – November 23, 2021	Garth Ennis	Liam Sharp	
Batman: The Imposter	#1–3	October 12, 2021 – December 14, 2021	Mattson Tomlin	Andrea Sorrentino	
Peacemaker: Disturbing the Peace	#1	January 25, 2022	Garth Ennis	Garry Brown	
Batman/Catwoman Special	#1	January 25, 2022	Tom King	John Paul Leon	
Batman vs. Bigby! A Wolf in Gotham	#1–6	September 28, 2021 – February 22, 2022	Bill Willingham	Brian Level	
Superman vs. Lobo	#1–3	August 24, 2021 – March 8, 2022	Tim Seeley; Sarah Beattie	Mirka Andolfo	
Suicide Squad: Get Joker!	#1–3	August 3, 2021 – May 10, 2022	Brian Azzarello	Alex Maleev	
Batman/Catwoman	#1–12	December 1, 2020 – June 28, 2022	Tom King	Clay Mann	
Suicide Squad: Blaze	#1–3	February 8, 2022 – July 5, 2022	Simon Spurrier	Aaron Campbell	
Batman: One Dark Knight	#1–3	December 21, 2021 – July 26, 2022	Jock		
Tales of the Human Target	#1	August 23, 2022	Tom King	Greg Smallwood	
Rogues	#1–4	March 22, 2022 – October 18, 2022	Joshua Williamson	Leomacs	
Aquaman: Andromeda	#1–3	June 7, 2022 – October 18, 2022	Ram V	Christian Ward	
Catwoman: Lonely City	#1–4	October 19, 2021 – October 25, 2022	Cliff Chiang		
The Nice House on the Lake	#1–12	June 1, 2021 – December 27, 2022	James Tynion IV	Álvaro Martínez Bueno	
Wonder Woman Historia: The Amazons	#1–3	November 30, 2021 – December 27, 2022	Kelly Sue DeConnick	Phil Jimenez; Gene Ha; Nicola Scott	
The Human Target	#1–12	November 2, 2021 – February 28, 2023	Tom King	Greg Smallwood	
Swamp Thing: Green Hell	#1–3	December 28, 2021 – March 21, 2023	Jeff Lemire	Doug Mahnke	
Batman & The Joker: The Deadly Duo	#1–7	November 1, 2022 – May 2, 2023	Marc Silvestri		
The Riddler: Year One	#1–6	October 25, 2022 – August 29, 2023	Paul Dano	Stevan Subic	
Peacemaker Tries Hard	#1–6	May 2, 2023 – October 3, 2023	Kyle Starks	Steve Pugh	
Danger Street	#1–12	December 13, 2022 – December 12, 2023	Tom King	Jorge Fornés	
Waller vs. WildStorm	#1–4	March 28, 2023 – December 12, 2023	Spencer Ackerman; Evan Narcisse	Eric Battle	
Batman: City of Madness	#1–3	October 10, 2023 - February 13, 2024	Christian Ward		
Fables	#1–12	May 17, 2022 – March 12, 2024	Bill Willingham	Mark Buckingham	
The Bat-Man: First Knight	#1–3	March 5, 2024 – May 21, 2024	Dan Jurgens	Mike Perkins	
The Boy Wonder	#1–5	May 7, 2024 – September 4, 2024	Juni Ba		
The Nice House by the Sea	#1–3	July 24, 2024 – October 2, 2024	James Tynion IV	Álvaro Martínez Bueno	
Zatanna: Bring Down the House	#1–5	June 25, 2024 – October 23, 2024	Mariko Tamaki	Javier Rodríguez	
Plastic Man No More!	#1–4	September 4, 2024 – December 4, 2024	Christopher Cantwell	Alex Lins	
Jenny Sparks	#1–7	August 21, 2024 – February 19, 2025	Tom King	Jeff Spokes	
Batman: Full Moon	#1–4	October 16, 2024 – March 5, 2025	Rodney Barnes	Stevan Subic	
Superman: The Last Days of Lex Luthor	#1–3	July 25, 2023 – April 23, 2025	Mark Waid	Bryan Hitch	
Peacemaker Presents: The Vigilante/Eagly Double Feature!	#1–5	March 26, 2025 – August 27, 2025	Tim Seeley; Rex Ogle	Mitch Gerads; Matteo Lolli	
Resurrection Man: Quantum Karma	#1–6	April 2, 2025 – September 3, 2025	Ram V	Anand RK	
Superman: The Kryptonite Spectrum	#1–5	August 13, 2025 – December 17, 2025	W. Maxwell Prince	Martin Morazzo	
The Bat-Man: Second Knight	#1–3	September 17, 2025 – February 25, 2026	Dan Jurgens	Mike Perkins	
Sirens: Love Hurts	#1–4	February 11, 2026 – May 20, 2026	Tini Howard	Babs Tarr	
Batman: Gargoyle of Gotham	#1–4	September 16, 2023 – June 10, 2026	Rafael Grampá		
Batman/Green Arrow/The Question: Arcadia	#1–4	November 26, 2025 – June 24, 2026	Gabriel Hardman		
Swamp Thing 1989	#1–4	April 29, 2026 – July 22, 2026	Rick Veitch	Michael Zulli; Vince Locke	
Publishing
Superman: The Stranger	#1–6	September 2, 2026 – present	Wes Craig		
Upcoming
Swamp Thing Is Killing the Children	#1–TBD	TBD	James Tynion IV	Werther Dell'Edera	
Joker/Harley: Malicious Intent	#1–4	TBD	Kami Garcia	Mico Suayan; Jason Badower	
Green Lantern: The Dying of the Light	#1–5	TBD	Jason Aaaron	Tirso Cons	
Unproduced
Wonder Woman: Diana's Daughter	TBD				

== Black Label lines ==
Several lines occur under the Black Label imprint. Each of these Lines are often shared under the same creative umbrella with some sort of connections between each series, whether that be through creative teams, shared universe or even thematically.

=== The Sandman Universe ===
The line was launched in order to celebrate the 30th anniversary of Neil Gaiman's The Sandman (1989–1996) and for Vertigo's 25th anniversary. The line began in August 2018 with The Sandman Universe being unveiled by creator Neil Gaiman. This line was initially published under the Vertigo label, but DC closed the Vertigo line in January 2020 as part of a reorganization of age-directed imprints. All Sandman Universe titles were published under DC Black Label, but with Vertigo's relaunch in 2024, the Sandman Universe reverted back to Vertigo Comics.

=== Hill House Comics ===
Hill House Comics is a pop-up horror line of comics founded and curated by Joe Hill under DC Black Label. The first title, Basketful of Heads #1, written by Joe Hill, was released on October 30, 2019. There is also a backup story, Sea Dogs, written by Joe Hill in every comic series, with each chapter of this story following the order of when each comic issue under Hill House Comics was released. A Sea Dogs trade paperback was published in a trade paperback format as part of a Hill House Box Set that collected all the backup stories and added additional pages. The latest series in this imprint, Refrigerator Full of Heads was a sequel to the first series released and concluded in April 2022.

Hill House Comics
Title	Issues	Publication date	Writer	Artist	Ref.
Released
Basketful of Heads	#1–7	October 30, 2019 – May 27, 2020	Joe Hill	Leomacs	
The Dollhouse Family	#1–6	November 13, 2019 – May 20, 2020	Mike Carey	Peter Gross; Vince Locke	
The Low, Low, Woods	#1–6	December 18, 2019 – June 23, 2020	Carmen Maria Machado	Dani	
Daphne Byrne	#1–6	January 8, 2020 – June 10, 2020	Laura Marks	Kelley Jones	
Plunge	#1–6	February 19, 2020 – August 25, 2020	Joe Hill	Stuart Immonen	
Sea Dogs	Backup stories	October 26, 2021	Joe Hill	Dan McDaid	
Refrigerator Full of Heads	#1–6	October 19, 2021 – April 19, 2022	Rio Youers	Tom Fowler	

=== Murphyverse ===
By March 2020, following the success of Batman: White Knight (2017–2018) and Batman: Curse of the White Knight (2019–2020), both comics created by Sean Murphy, DC was reportedly interested in creating a mini-imprint centered around Murphy's works. Referred to as the "Murphyverse", the imprint features limited series set in the shared universe first established in the White Knight series. The main line titles in this universe have been written and drawn by Murphy himself, with spin-offs being written and drawn by other creators.

== Collected edition ==
=== DC Black Label reprinted material ===
A number of series that were reprinted under this label were original titles originally published under DC Vertigo, WildStorm or titles originally published by DC Comics.

Title	Material collected	Writer	Artist	Pages	Publication date
100 Bullets: Book One (2024 Edition)	100 Bullets #1-19 and a short story from Vertigo: Winter's Edge #3	Brian Azzarello	Eduardo Risso	453	April 2, 2024
100 Bullets: Book Two (2025 Edition)	100 Bullets #20-36	Brian Azzarello	Eduardo Risso	416	April 22, 2025
Animal Man by Grant Morrison and Chaz Truog Compendium	#1-26 and a tale from Secret Origins #39	Grant Morrison	Chaz Truog	712	October 1, 2024
Animal Man Omnibus (2022 Edition)	#1-26 and a tale from Secret Origins #39	Grant Morrison	Chaz Truog	712	August 23, 2022
Batman: White Knight	Batman: White Knight #1-8	Sean Murphy		232	October 9, 2018
Bodies	Bodies #1-8	Si Spencer	Meghan Hetrick, Dean Ormston, Tula Lotay and Phil Winslade	208	October 31, 2023
DC: The New Frontier	DC: The New Frontier #1-6	Darwyn Cooke		407	February 19, 2019
DMZ: Compendium One	DMZ #1-36	Brian Wood	Riccardo Burchielli	840	March 31, 2020
DMZ: Compendium Two	DMZ #37-72	Brian Wood	Riccardo Burchielli	824	January 11, 2022
Fables: Compendium One	Fables #1-41, Fables: The Last Castle, A Wolf in the Fold, Fables: 1,001 Nights of Snowfall	Bill Willingham	Mark Buckingham	1180	October 20, 2020
Fables: Compendium Two	Fables #42–82	Bill Willingham	Mark Buckingham	1402	May 11, 2021
Fables: Compendium Three	Fables #83–113; Jack of Fables #33–35, The Literals #1–3, Fables: Werewolves of the Heartland #1, Pinocchio's Army	Bill Willingham	Mark Buckingham	1094	August 24, 2021
Fables: Compendium Four	Fables #114–150	Bill Willingham	Mark Buckingham	909	December 21, 2021
Green Arrow: The Longbow Hunters Saga Omnibus Volume 1	Green Arrow: The Longbow Hunters #1-3, Green Arrow #1-50, and a story from Secret Origins #38	Mike Grell		1536	September 1, 2020
Green Arrow: The Longbow Hunters Saga Omnibus Volume 2	Green Arrow #51-80, Green Arrow: The Wonder Year #1-4, Shado: Song of the Dragon #1-4, The Brave and the Bold #1-6, Green Arrow Annual #4, 6	Mike Grell		1480	December 28, 2021
iZombie Omnibus (2023 Edition)	iZombie #1-28	Chris Roberson	Mike Allred	656	October 24, 2023
Joker: 10th Anniversary Edition	Joker (2008)	Brian Azzarello	Lee Bermejo	144	July 3, 2019
Luthor 10th Anniversary Edition	Lex Luthor: Man of Steel #1-5	Brian Azzarello	Lee Bermejo	144	July 9, 2019
Saga of the Swamp Thing Box Set	Saga of the Swamp Thing Volume #1-6	Alan Moore	Stephen Bissette, John Totleben, Rick Veitch and Alfredo Alcala	1238	December 27, 2021
Scalped Omnibus Volume 1	Scalped #1-29	Jason Aaron	R. M. Guéra	752	November 12, 2024
Scalped Omnibus Volume 2	Scalped #30-60	Jason Aaron	R. M. Guéra	768	February 4, 2025
Sweet Tooth Compendium	Sweet Tooth #1-40	Jeff Lemire		920	June 8, 2021
The Sleeper Omnibus (2022 Edition)	Point Blank #1-5, Sleeper #1-24, Coup d'etat: Sleeper #1 and Coup d'etat: Afterward #1	Ed Brubaker	Sean Phillips	736	December 27, 2022
V for Vendetta	V for Vendetta #1-10	Alan Moore	David Loyd	296	November 17, 2021
Watchmen	Watchmen #1-12	Alan Moore	Dave Gibbons	414	May 20, 2019
Y: The Last Man Compendium One	Y: The Last Man #1-31	Brian K. Vaughan	Pia Guerra	728	November 10, 2020
Y: The Last Man Compendium Two	Y: The Last Man #32-60	Brian K. Vaughan	Pia Guerra	704	March 8, 2022

=== DC Black Label Collected ===
Collected editions
Title	Material collected	Format	Writer	Artist	Pages	Publication date	ISBN
Batman: Damned	Batman: Damned #1–3	HC	Brian Azzarello	Lee Bermejo	160	September 4, 2019	978-1401291402
Superman: Year One	Superman: Year One #1–3	HC	Frank Miller	John Romita Jr.	160	November 12, 2019	978-1401291372
Harleen	Harleen #1–3	HC	Stjepan Šejić		160	February 11, 2020	978-1779501110
Batman: Last Knight on Earth	Batman: Last Knight on Earth #1–3	HC	Scott Snyder	Greg Capullo	184	April 7, 2020	978-1401294960
Basketful of Heads	Basketful of Heads #1–7	HC	Joe Hill	Leomacs; Dave Stewart	184	September 8, 2020	978-1779502971
Joker: Killer Smile	Joker: Killer Smile #1–3 and Batman: The Smile Killer #1	HC	Jeff Lemire	Andrea Sorrentino	160	September 15, 2020	978-1779502698
Dark Knight Returns: The Golden Child – The Deluxe Edition	Dark Knight Returns: The Golden Child	HC	Frank Miller	Rafael Grampá	80	September 15, 2020	978-1779503916
The Dollhouse Family	The Dollhouse Family #1–6	HC	Mike Carey	Peter Gross; Vince Locke	160	October 13, 2020	978-1779504647
Daphne Byrne	Daphne Byrne #1–6	HC	Laura Marks	Kelley Jones	160	November 3, 2020	978-1779504654
Batman: Three Jokers	Batman: Three Jokers #1–3	HC	Geoff Johns	Jason Fabok	160	November 17, 2020	978-1779500236
Plunge	Plunge #1-6	HC	Joe Hill	Jeremy Wilson	168	November 17, 2020	978-1779506887
The Question: The Deaths of Vic Sage	The Question: The Deaths of Vic Sage #1–4	HC	Jeff Lemire	Denys Cowan	200	November 24, 2020	978-1779505583
Wonder Woman: Dead Earth	Wonder Woman: Dead Earth #1–4	HC	Daniel Warren Johnson		200	December 1, 2020	978-1779502612
Harley Quinn & the Birds of Prey: The Hunt for Harley	Harley Quinn & the Birds of Prey #1–4 and a story from Harley Quinn Black + White + Red #12	HC	Jimmy Palmiotti	Amanda Conner	160	March 23, 2021	978-1779504494
Hellblazer: Rise and Fall	Hellblazer: Rise and Fall #1-3	HC	Tom Taylor	Darick Robertson	200	April 27, 2021	978-1779504661
The Last God: Book I of the Fellspyre Chronicles	The Last God #1–12, The Last God: Tales from the Book of Ages #1 and The Last God: Songs of Lost Children #1	HC	Phillip Kennedy Johnson	Riccardo Federici	448	August 3, 2021	978-1779510549
Sweet Tooth: The Return	Sweet Tooth: The Return #1–6	TP	Jeff Lemire		152	August 17, 2021	978-1779510327
Joker/Harley: Criminal Sanity	Joker/Harley: Criminal Sanity #1–8 and Joker/Harley: Criminal Sanity Secret Files #1	HC	Kami Garcia	Mico Suayan	304	September 7, 2021	978-1779512024
The Low, Low Woods	The Low, Low Woods #1–6	HC	Carmen Maria Machado	Dani	160	September 21, 2021	978-1779504524
American Vampire 1976	American Vampire 1976 #1–10	HC	Scott Snyder	Rafael Albuquerque	264	November 2, 2021	978-1779512673
Hill House Box Set	Basketful of Heads #1–7, The Dollhouse Family #1–6, The Low, Low, Woods #1-6, Daphne Byrne #1-6, Plunge #1-6, Sea Dogs, Refrigerator Full of Heads #1–6	HC	Joe Hill	Various	Various	November 9, 2021	978-1779512215
The Other History of the DC Universe	The Other History of the DC Universe #1–5	HC	John Ridley	Giuseppe Camuncoli	224	November 16, 2021	978-1779511973
Rorschach	Rorschach #1–12	HC	Tom King	Jorge Fornés	312	December 7, 2021	978-1779512048
Strange Adventures	Strange Adventures #1–12	HC	Tom King	Mitch Gerads; Evan Shaner	376	December 14, 2021	978-1779512031
Batman: The Imposter	Batman: The Imposter #1–3	HC	Mattson Tomlin	Andrea Sorrentino	168	February 22, 2022	978-1779514325
The Nice House on the Lake Vol. 1	The Nice House on the Lake #1–6	TP	James Tynion IV	Alvaro Martinez	200	March 1, 2022	978-1779514349
Batman vs. Bigby! A Wolf in Gotham	Batman vs. Bigby! A Wolf in Gotham #1–6	TP	Bill Willingham	Brian Level	160	May 10, 2022	978-1779515254
Batman: Reptilian	Batman: Reptilian #1–6	HC	Garth Ennis	Liam Sharp	160	May 31, 2022	978-1779515339
Suicide Squad: Get Joker!	Suicide Squad: Get Joker! #1–3	HC	Brian Azzarello	Alex Maleev	160	July 5, 2022	978-1779514257
Superman Vs. Lobo	Superman Vs. Lobo #1-3	HC	Tim Seeley; Sarah Beattie	Mirka Andolfo	176	August 2, 2022	978-1779517913
The Human Target Volume One	Human Target #1–6	HC	Tom King	Greg Smallwood	192	September 13, 2022	978-1779516701
Batman: One Dark Knight	Batman: One Dark Knight #1–3	HC	Jock		168	September 20, 2022	978-1779510280
Rogues	Rogues #1–4	HC	Joshua Williamson	Leomacs	208	October 4, 2022	978-1779516855
Refrigerator Full of Heads	Refrigerator Full of Heads #1–6	HC	Rio Youers	Tom Fowler	160	October 18, 2022	978-1779516909
Catwoman: Lonely City	Catwoman: Lonely City #1-4	HC	Cliff Chiang		208	November 22, 2022	978-1779516367
Batman/Catwoman	Batman/Catwoman #1-12, Batman (2016) Annual #2, and material from Detective Comics #1027, Catwoman 80th Anniversary 100-Page Super Spectacular #1 and Batman/Catwoman Special #1	HC	Tom King	Clay Mann	272	December 13, 2022	978-1779517074
Suicide Squad: Blaze	Suicide Squad: Blaze #1–3	HC	Simon Spurrier	Aaron Campbell	168	January 10, 2023	978-1779514264
Wonder Woman Historia: The Amazons	Wonder Woman Historia: The Amazons #1-3	HC	Kelly Sue DeConnick	Phil Jimenez; Gene Ha; Nicola Scott	232	June 6, 2023	978-1779521354
The Human Target Volume Two	Human Target #7–12	HC	Tom King	Greg Smallwood	232	July 18, 2023	978-1779520210
Swamp Thing: Green Hell	Swamp Thing: Green Hell #1-3	HC	Jeff Lemire	Doug Mahnke	152	August 1, 2023	978-1779517234
Batman & The Joker: The Deadly Duo	Batman & The Joker: The Deadly Duo #1-7	HC	Marc Silvestri		208	September 12, 2023	978-1779523105
The Nice House on the Lake: Deluxe Edition	The Nice House on the Lake #1-12	HC	James Tynion IV	Álvaro Martínez Bueno	400	October 17, 2023	978-1779521576
Aquaman: Andromeda	Aquaman: Andromeda #1-3	HC	Ram V	Christian Ward	176	November 21, 2023	978-1779517333
The Riddler: Year One	The Riddler: Year One #1-6	HC	Paul Dano	Stevan Subic	232	November 21, 2023	978-1779523068
Danger Street Vol. 1	Danger Street #1-6	TPB	Tom King	Jorge Fornés	192	November 28, 2023	978-1779518422
Waller Vs. Wildstorm	Waller Vs. Wildstorm #1-4	HC	Spencer Ackerman; Evan Narcisse	Eric Battle	144	Jan 30, 2024	978-1779517517
Peacemaker Tries Hard!	Peacemaker Tries Hard #1-6	HC	Kyle Starks	Steve Pugh	160	Feb 6, 2024	978-1779524324
Fables: The Deluxe Edition Book 16	Fables #1-12	HC	Bill Willingham	Mark Buckingham	312	May 7, 2024	978-1779524027
Danger Street Vol. 2	Danger Street #7-12	TPB	Tom King	Jorge Fornés	184	May 28, 2024	978-1779524959
Batman: City of Madness	Batman: City of Madness	HC	Christian Ward		160	Sept 3, 2024	978-1779527028
The Boy Wonder	The Boy Wonder #1-5	HC	Juni Ba		184	Feb 11, 2025	978-1799500322
The Nice House by the Sea Vol. 1	The Nice House by the Sea #1-6	TPB	James Tynion IV	Álvaro Martínez Bueno	168	Jun 10, 2025	978-1799500605
Zatanna: Bring Down the House	Zatanna: Bring Down the House #1-5	HC	Mariko Tamaki	Javier Rodríguez	176	Mar 18, 2025	978-1799500803
Plastic Man No More!	Plastic Man No More! #1-4	HC	Christopher Cantwell	Alex Lins	152	April 22, 2025	978-1799501015
Batman: Full Moon	Batman: Full Moon #1-4	HC	Rodney Barnes	Stevan Subic	160	May 13, 2025	978-1799501336
Jenny Sparks: Be Better	Jenny Sparks #1-7	TPB	Tom King	Jeff Spokes	216	May 27, 2025	978-1799501534
Superman: The Last Days of Lex Luthor	Superman: The Last Days of Lex Luthor #1-3	HC	Mark Waid	Bryan Hitch	168	July 8, 2025	978-1799500780
Peacemaker Presents: The Vigilante/Eagly Double Feature!	Peacemaker Presents: The Vigilante/Eagly Double Feature! #1-5	TPB	Tim Seeley; Rex Ogle	Mitch Gerads; Matteo Lolli	128	Nov 11, 2025	978-1799506331
The Human Target by Tom King and Greg Smallwood: The Deluxe Edition	The Human Target #1-12 and Tales of the Human Target #1	HC	Tom King	Greg Smallwood	456	Dec 16, 2025	978-1799503224
Resurrection Man: Quantum Karma	Resurrection Man: Quantum Karma #1-6	TPB	Ram V	Anand RK	160	Jan 20, 2026	978-1799505969
Superman: The Kryptonite Spectrum	Superman: The Kryptonite Spectrum #1-5	HC	W. Maxwell Prince	Martin Morazzo	184	April 21, 2026	978-1799506218
The Bat-Man: Second Knight	The Bat-Man: Second Knight #1-3	HC	Dan Jurgens	Mike Perkins	168	May 5, 2026	978-1799505662
Wonder Woman: Historia: The Amazons: Absolute Edition	Wonder Woman Historia: The Amazons #1-3	HC	Kelly Sue DeConnick	Phil Jimenez; Gene Ha; Nicola Scott	232	August 11, 2026	978-1799508465
Batman: Gargoyle of Gotham - The Deluxe Edition	Batman: Gargoyle of Gotham #1-4	HC	Rafael Grampá		232	September 15, 2026	978-1799501176
Batman/Green Arrow/The Question: Arcadia	''Batman: Gargoyle of Gotham #1-4	HC	Gabriel Hardman		152	September 22, 2026	978-1799505518
