= Batman: The Imposter =

Limited comic book series by Mattson Tomlin and Andrea Sorrentino

- Cover of Batman: The Imposter #1 (October 2021), art by Andrea Sorrentino.

Publication information
- Publisher: DC Comics
- Schedule: Monthly
- Format: Limited series
- Genre: Neo-noir; Superhero
- Publication date: October – December 2021
- No. of issues: 3
- Main character(s): Batman; Leslie Thompkins; Blair Wong

Creative team
- Written by: Mattson Tomlin
- Artist: Andrea Sorrentino
- Letterer: Andrea Sorrentino
- Colorist: Jordie Bellaire

Collected editions
- Hardcover: ISBN 978-1779514325

Batman: The Imposter is an American comic book published by DC Comics under its Black Label imprint. The three-issue limited series, written by Mattson Tomlin and illustrated and lettered by Andrea Sorrentino, began publication on October 12 and concluded on December 14, 2021. The limited series was released to critical acclaim, with critics praising the mature story, action, and Sorrentino's art. The standalone story takes place in the early years of Batman, in which an imposter dressed as Batman murders Gotham criminals while Bruce Wayne tackles the duality of his crime-fighting lifestyle.

== Plot summary ==
Leslie Thompkins awakens to find Batman bleeding on the floor, and uncovers his mask, realizing that Bruce Wayne is Batman. She decides to not call the cops on Batman and nurses him back to health. When Bruce wakes up, Leslie forces him to recount on how he had to stop three armed robbers in a shop, but was heavily injured. Bruce explains he became Batman to control his rage in order to make Gotham City a better place. Leslie tells Bruce that he can leave her place, but on the condition that every morning at dawn Bruce must meet up with Leslie to talk about his methods.

Meanwhile, a man named Mr. Wesker is not happy about Batman being in Gotham City and wants Detective Blair Wong to arrest him. Detective Wong learns that someone dressed as Batman has been killing innocent people and Gotham City Police Department decides to arrest the Batman killer. Bruce Wayne meets up with Leslie Thompkins and tells her that he isn't the killer, and confronted The Loman Family and Penguin about it, but they also denied hiring someone to be the killer. Bruce Wayne and Detective Wong deduce that the imposter is targeting criminals in the upper class and may have a personal vendetta against the victims. Detective Wong meets up with Bruce Wayne to talk about the Batman.

Detective Wong asks Bruce Wayne if he is selling motorcycles to Batman, but Bruce successfully convinces Detective Wong to leave. As Leslie waits for Batman, she recalls Bruce Wayne being in fights at a young age, and Alfred Pennyworth quitting his job due to Bruce's behavior after Bruce is sent to military school in Russia and disappeared. Batman arrives and tells Leslie he was late because he went to Mr. Wesker's company to get technology to find the imposter. Batman gets in a fight with a couple of guards and escapes after successfully managing to hack Wesker's network and meeting Arnold Wesker who wants Batman to kill his father.

Bruce recounts what happened with Detective Wong to Leslie Thompkins, and realizes that the Batman imposter is targeting criminals. Bruce also realizes that Detective Wong can help him catch the imposter because she has a similar backstory to him, which he can take advantage of. The next day, Bruce and Detective Wong bond and have sex. Bruce dresses up as Batman, and realizes that the majority of the victims were sentenced by the same judge name Alex McCard. Batman confronts Alex McCard, but Alex tells Batman that the victims were free after Batman and Jim Gordon exposed that three criminal families had five judges on their payroll, and the imposter is killing the victims to clean up Batman and Gordon's mistake.

Detective Wong asks Mr. Wesker to let her access the surveillance network while Batman tries to find Otis Flannegan, an accomplice of the Batman killer. Batman attacks Detective Wong, Otis and her partner Hatcher and abducts Otis to a secret location and asks Hatcher who the imposter is, but Otis says he doesn't know. Detective Wong and Hatcher gather more guns to take down Batman.

Otis Flannegan commits suicide in the police department, but not before revealing the Batman imposter had a hideout in the sewers. Batman confronts the imposter but the Gotham Police arrive and start shooting at Batman. Batman is wounded heavily and caught by Detective Wong. Batman reveals his identity to convince Detective Wong he isn't the killer, and she lets him go. Bruce Wayne meets up with Leslie Thompkins to tell her he won't be attending her therapy sessions. Leslie tries convincing Bruce that Batman isn't the solution to the crime problem, Bruce Wayne could donate to charity to make Gotham City a better place but Bruce ignores her. Bruce Wayne realizes the imposter is using guns from Lawrence Loman who wants to be the Kingpin of Gotham City. Batman meets up with Detective Wong to ask her for help and asks her to meet alone. They meet up, but Wong is shot by the Batman Imposter. As Batman fights the imposter, the Imposter reveals himself to be Wong's partner Hatcher who tells Batman the reason why he is killing the criminals is because of Batman and Gordon's mistake. Batman and Wong manage to defeat the imposter, and allows himself to be arrested by Wong. Batman asks Wong if she arrests him, would Gotham City be safe, and Wong decides to let him escape. Batman meets up with Arnold Wesker, but instead of turning Arnold in Batman leads him to Leslie Thompkins and visits his parents grave before vowing to help Gotham City as Bruce Wayne.

== Publication ==
Batman: The Imposter was written by Mattson Tomlin and illustrated and lettered by Andrea Sorrentino, with colors by Jordie Bellaire. Tomlin used some of the ideas he developed for the DC Studios film The Batman (2022) to create this limited series. The series is part of the DC Black Label, a DC Comics imprint designed to allow comic book writers to submit their own unique interpretations of traditional DC Universe (DCU) characters for a more mature audience. The three issues of Batman: The Imposter were released by DC Comics at monthly intervals, with the first being published on October 12, 2021, and the last on December 14. Batman: The Imposter was also published simultaneously in the following territories: Argentina, Brazil, Czech Republic, France, Germany, Italy, Japan, Mexico, Poland, Russia, South Korea, Spain and Turkey. The three issues were collected into a hardcover edition of the series, which was published on February 22, 2022.

=== Issues ===
Issue	Publication date
#1	October 12, 2021
#2	November 9, 2021
#3	December 14, 2021

== Reception ==
Reviewing Batman: The Imposter, Dustin Holland of Comic Book Resources described the life-like version of Batman featured in the series as "a refreshingly vulnerable vision of the Dark Knight". Holland also commented on how the brutal fight sequences increase the "human quality" of the comic book. At the end of his analysis, Holland wrote: "Batman: The Imposter kicks off the series with a bang and promises more thought-provoking, beautifully drawn excitement is to come". Chris Arrant of GamesRadar+ compared Batman: The Imposter to Batman: Year One, Gotham Central and Batman: Earth One, due to the realistic tone the series addresses, which is similar to the other three comics.

According to Comicscored.com, the series received generally favorable ratings, with a Comicscore Index of 73 based on 30 ratings from critics.

According to Comic Books Roundup, the series received an average score of 8.3 out of 10 based on 27 reviews.

== See also ==
- Gideon Falls - another comic book series co-created and illustrated by Sorrentino
