= The Bone Orchard Mythos =

2022 comicbook series

- The Bone Orchard Mythos Prelude cover by Andrea Sorrentino
- Created by: Jeff Lemire & Andrea Sorrentino

Publication information
- Publisher: Image Comics
- Schedule: Varied
- Formats: Original material for the series has been published as a set of limited series, graphic novels, and one-shot comics.
- Genre: Horror
- Publication date: May 7, 2022 – July 30, 2024

Creative team
- Writer(s): Jeff Lemire
- Artist(s): Andrea Sorrentino
- Letterer(s): Steve Wands
- Colorist(s): Dave Stewart
- Editor(s): Greg Lockard

Reprints
- Collected editions
- The Passageway: ISBN 9781534322240
- Ten Thousand Black Feathers: ISBN 9781534325883
- Tenement: ISBN 9781534397149

The Bone Orchard Mythos is a comic book project consisting of limited series, graphic novels, and one-shots by writer Jeff Lemire and artist Andrea Sorrentino, published by Image Comics. It is designed to be a shared universe of self-contained horror stories told in various formats. The project ended in 2024, due to sales and the creators' personal reasons.

== Publication history ==
Early on, even before The Bone Orchard Mythos was announced, Jeff Lemire described the project as "the most ambitious thing [Andrea Sorrentino] and I have done together." During their first creator-owned work together, Gideon Falls, Lemire discovered that despite the complexity of the project, he and Sorrentino bounced ideas off of each other in a way that felt effortless, which made him feel like they could tackle a project even more challenging. The idea for The Bone Orchard Mythos sprang from Sorrentino, who wanted to do darker stories, but expansive like H. P. Lovecraft's Cthulhu Mythos; individual stand-alone stories which share a common mythology. Sorrentino also wanted to do different formats, miniseries, maxiseries, original graphic novels, and more. He described the series as "the kind of stories I want to read as a graphic novel and comics fan, and the kind of things I want to draw as an artist." Part of the appeal of doing different stories was that it opened up more opportunities to experiment with his style and stay fresh.

It was essential to both creators though that any story could act as an entry point to the series, that they could be read in any order and still make sense. The connections between the books are an additional feature for more dedicated readers. Over a period of a year before the series was announced, Lemire and Sorrentino worked out the whole story, plotted out in chronological order. However, they do not plan to ever tell the full story, but rather show "enough" of the story that readers get a sense of it, told non-chronologically through the various stand-alone stories. It is designed to be interpreted. This approach was inspired by the work of David Lynch.

The series was announced with a teaser trailer on Halloween 2021 with further details emerging over the following week from the social media channels of Lemire, Sorrentino, and Image Comics. Three titles were revealed in the initial announcement (The Passageway, Ten Thousand Black Feathers, and Tenement) along with promise of more in 2023 and beyond.

=== Prelude: Shadow Eater ===
Originally published as a one-shot story for Free Comic Book Day (FCBD) 2022, Shadow Eater was designed to be "an appetizer for the horror to come." While the FCBD issue was mentioned as part of the original announcement, no details, not even a title, were revealed until Lemire teased his newsletter readers with the comic's cover a month ahead of the FCBD 2022 titles reveal announcement.

=== The Passageway ===
The first major story in the series was The Passageway, an original graphic novel released on June 15, 2022. Originally a different story was meant to be the first, but when Lemire could not get that story to work, he came up with the idea for The Passageway and wrote the script in a week. For Lemire, it was essential that the story be character-driven, rather than driven by its concept. Sorrentino felt The Passageway was the right story to establish The Bone Orchard Mythos since it was about the "passageway" to supernatural horrors of their universe, both for readers and the characters in the story.

=== Ten Thousand Black Feathers ===
Ten Thousand Black Feathers is a 5-issue miniseries, released monthly beginning in September 2022.

Ten Thousand Black Feathers issues
Issue	Publication date	Covers
#1	September 14, 2022	Standard cover by Andrea Sorrentino; Variant cover by Christian Ward; Variant cover by Martin Simmonds; Black sketch cover; Standard cover (no trade dress); "Crow King" variant cover by Andrea Sorrentino; Variant cover by Mike Del Mundo
#2	October 19, 2022	Standard cover by Andrea Sorrentino; Variant cover by Dani with colors by Brad Simpson; Variant cover by Martin Simmonds
#3	November 16, 2022	Standard cover by Andrea Sorrentino; Variant cover by Dustin Nguyen; Variant cover by Martin Simmonds
#4	December 14, 2022	Standard cover by Andrea Sorrentino; Variant cover by Yuko Shimizu; Variant cover by Martin Simmonds
#5	January 11, 2023	Standard cover by Andrea Sorrentino; Variant cover by Rafael Albuquerque; Variant cover by Martin Simmonds

=== Tenement ===
Tenement was the last of the three titles revealed in the original announcement. Though it was at first slated to be an original graphic novel, it had become a six-issue miniseries by the time Starseed was announced, and later it was further expanded to ten issues with a double-length first issue. This was so readers could spend time with the seven leads and invest in their stories. Tenement #1 was released on June 21, 2023.

When Lemire and Sorrentino were originally discussing possible stories to act as the reader's introduction to The Bone Orchard Mythos, Tenement was their initial choice before later settling on The Passageway. It was the first story that Lemire began working on and meant to be a centerpiece for all the stories to date, connecting threads from previous stories while expanding the larger mythology.

Tenement issues
Issue	Publication date	Covers
#1	June 21, 2023	Standard cover by Andrea Sorrentino; Variant cover by Christian Ward; Variant cover by Martin Simmonds; Black sketch cover; Standard cover (no trade dress); "Us'uuul" variant cover by Andrea Sorrentino; Variant cover by Tradd Moore
#2	July 26, 2023	Standard cover by Andrea Sorrentino; Variant cover by Christian Ward
#3	August 23, 2023	Standard cover by Andrea Sorrentino; Variant cover by Christian Ward
#4	September 20, 2023	Standard cover by Andrea Sorrentino; Variant cover by Christian Ward
#5	October 18, 2023	Standard cover by Andrea Sorrentino; Variant cover by Christian Ward; The Walking Dead 20th anniversary variant cover by Andrea Sorrentino
#6	November 22, 2023	Standard cover by Andrea Sorrentino; Variant cover by Christian Ward
#7	December 27, 2023	Standard cover by Andrea Sorrentino; Variant cover by Christian Ward
#8	January 24, 2024	Standard cover by Andrea Sorrentino; Variant cover by Christian Ward
#9	February 21, 2024	Standard cover by Andrea Sorrentino; Variant cover by Christian Ward
#10	March 20, 2024	Standard cover by Andrea Sorrentino; Variant cover by Christian Ward

=== Starseed ===
For Halloween 2022, Lemire announced Starseed in his newsletter. The story was originally scheduled for release in 2024, until Lemire announced an indefinite hiatus for The Bone Orchard Mythos.

== Reception ==
=== Critical reception ===
==== The Passageway ====
Critics generally praised the debut OGN, especially Andrea Sorrentino's layouts. Reviewers were more divided on the plot ambiguity, with some finding it intriguing, others finding it a little slight, and still others finding it unsatisfying, confusing, or under-developed. In an informal poll, Multiversity Comics' readers voted it the best OGN of 2022, 94% of League of Comic Geek readers liked the book with it averaging four stars, and the book has a 4.3 reader rating on Amazon.com.

==== Ten Thousand Black Feathers ====
Reviewers responding positively to Sorrentino's art, particularly praising the different art styles to separate past and present, reality and otherworldy, and dreamlike and nightmarish. The first issue in particular was praised for its intriguing hooks and characters, and later issues for their world building and character development, though with some criticism for leaning too heavily on well-worn coming-of-age tropes.

== Collected editions ==
Title	Material collected	Publication date	ISBN
The Passageway	Original material	June 15, 2022	9781534322240
Ten Thousand Black Feathers	Ten Thousand Black Feathers #1–5	May 10, 2023	9781534325883
Tenement	Tenement #1–10	July 30, 2024	9781534397149
