= Basketful of Heads =

Limited DC comic series

- Basketful of Heads #1 cover, art by Leomacs and Reiko Murakami.

Publication information
- Publisher: DC Comics
- Schedule: Monthly
- Format: Limited series
- Publication date: October 30, 2019 – May 27, 2020
- No. of issues: 7

Creative team
- Created by: Joe Hill
- Written by: Joe Hill
- Pencillers: Leomacs; Reiko Murakami
- Inker: Leomacs
- Letterer: Deron Bennett
- Colorist: Dave Stewart

Basketful of Heads is an American comic book limited horror series written by Joe Hill, pencilled by Leomacs and Reiko Murakami. It is the first series in his Hill House Comics imprint. It follows June Branch, who tries to rescue her kidnapped boyfriend with a basket and a magical axe.

The title was written as part of Hill House Comics, a pop-up horror line of comics that was created by DC Comics who appointed Hill to oversee this imprint. Hill started talking about the Hill House line in 2017 with editor Mark Doyle. The line was originally to be titled Vertigo Fall, then Joe Hill's Vertigo Fall, before eventually being named Hill House Comics.

The first issue was released in October 2019.

The series received critical acclaim; Hill's writing, the artwork, and the dark humor were praised.

== Plot ==
During the month of September 1983 on Brody Island in Maine, June Branch meets her boyfriend Liam on a suspension bridge. Liam is a summer hire for the local police department who is finishing up his last shift. While discussing their future, Liam recounts an incident where he had responded to a suicide at that same bridge earlier that summer.

June and Liam are stopped at the site of an apparent escape of prisoners from Shawshank Prison. June meets Police Chief Wade Clausen and City Councilman Ned Hamilton. Four inmates have escaped from hard labor duty and are on the loose. Wade discounts the escapees as being real threats due to the non-violent nature of their crimes. Liam offers to help in the search, but cannot due to his employment ending that day. Instead Wade informally asks that Liam and June look after his wife, Bobby, until the prisoners are apprehended.

Arriving at the Chief's home, June is introduced to Bobby, her son Hank and maid Gabby. Hank is a student at Harvard who serves as a congressional aide. While visiting the home, June learns of Wade's interest in Norse culture and his collection of Viking artifacts including an ornate battle axe.

While dining with the Clausens the group is informed of the death of Noel Flannagan, one of Wade's officers. Wade informs them that he believes that Noel fell to his death attempting to stop the escaped inmates from fleeing using a stolen boat. Bobby and Hank leave to inform Noel's wife and ask Liam and June to watch over the house while they are gone.

Later that evening, the pair are startled by a sound of someone entering the house. Liam asks June to hide while he investigates. While hiding June realizes that the inmates have broken into the home. June manages to evade the invaders but soon leaves to investigate when she hears Liam cry out in pain. She is shocked to find signs of a struggle and a severed finger. She is confronted by one of the inmates, Salvatore "Sal" Puzo. Sal has stayed behind while the other inmates have kidnapped Liam to search for some unknown item. June grabs the axe for her protection while Sal threatens her with a handgun. At the same time, the ongoing rainstorm knocks out electricity to the entire island. June manages to ambush Sal and uses the axe to kill him.

June is shocked to find that Sal is still alive as a severed head. She rescues Sal's head from floating out to sea. Shaking away her disbelief, she interrogates Sal about his intentions. Sal says that he and his fellow inmates heard that Liam had stolen a large amount of money from the suicide victim that he had mentioned earlier. Skeptical of the story June takes Sal's head with her in a basket and leaves to find help.

She finds Ned nearby with his pickup truck. Hiding Sal's head she explains her situation to Ned (hiding the fact she has killed Sal and his head is still alive). Ned agrees to drive her to find help and offers her his extra raincoat. The pair is forced to stop to clear a fallen tree in the road. While June uses her axe to clear the tree, Ned is shocked to find Sal's severed and gagged head in her basket. At the same time June finds a bloody pair of pruning shears in Ned's raincoat and deduces that they were used to cut off Liam's finger. Ned attacks June with a chain and tries to kill her. June manages to kill Ned and soon discovers that Ned still lives as a head as well. Ned professes innocence and claims he was only acting in self-defense when he discovered the severed head. This fills June with self-doubt.

June uses Ned's truck to drive into town with the still living heads in tow. Arriving at the police station, June finds Hank. June tells her story to Hank while again omitting the supernatural aspects. While changing clothes she finds a police softball jersey with Sal's name on it. Hank reveals that Sal was a police officer working for his father. Hank traps June in a jail cell and demands she reveal the location of a tape belonging to Liam. After shocking June with a stun gun, Hank begins to slowly reveal information regarding the situation. While serving as a congressional aide, Hank learns of an FBI investigation centering on Brody Island. An informant codenamed L.E. has been providing information about police corruption and investigating his family. Hank believes that L.E. is Liam since his last name is Ellsworth. Hank informed his father and upon further investigation found an empty cassette case belonging to Liam labeled "Police-Evidence".

Hank believes that he is the target of the investigation due to a sexual relationship he had with a woman named Emily Dunn. June recognizes the name as the woman who had committed suicide on the bridge. Emily was brought into the household by Gabby to help with house duties. Hank's affair with Emily led to her becoming pregnant. After an argument with her Emily has a miscarriage (it is unclear if this was due to physical assault or an accident). Bobby gives Emily a bribe in order to get her to leave town. Wade threatens to have Emily arrested for theft if word ever got about her affair with Hank. It was then that Emily decided to kill herself. Hank had revealed the affair to Liam and was afraid that this would be revealed to the authorities.

June deduces that the inmates that invaded the home was Sal, Hank, Ned and Wade. This would be used to frame the inmates for Liam's death. June tricks Hank into releasing her to look for the tape in her belongings. While searching the truck, Hank cuffs June to a lightpost. Hank discovers the basket of talking heads and panics. June grabs her axe to free herself, but finds that the ancient axe is ineffective against metal. She cuts off her own thumb to escape and succeeds in killing Hank. Now with three talking heads, June learns more about her situation. From Ned, she learns that he controlled drug trade on the island. He reveals that Liam had a flirtatious relationship with Ned's daughters. The daughters had shown Liam where Ned grew and stored his marijuana and poppy. He feared that Liam would use that information against him. Wade had planned and staged the inmate escape as a cover for silencing Liam. Noel had attempted to intervene and was murdered by Sal. It is revealed that Sal's involvement stemmed from fear that he would be outed as a homosexual by Liam.

June forces Hank to radio Wade to divert him away from his houseboat where he is holding Liam. June arrives on the houseboat and finds a tortured, but alive, Liam. She is attacked by Wade, who was tipped off by a coded message from Hank. June loses her axe overboard. Wade knocks June unconscious, ties an anchor around her and throws her overboard to die. Sinking in water, June is shocked to see she is surrounded by the corpses of the missing inmates. June manages to free herself using the axe and swims back to the boat.

While speaking with Liam, Wade finally realizes that Liam has been loyal to him throughout and that he is not the informant. Wade reveals that the axe that June has been using is said to have been used to cut Odin down from Yggdrasil, the world tree. The axe is said to bring life not death. Wade expresses regret about the situation but still intends to kill Liam. June attacks Wade and bisects his body leaving one arm attached to his head and torso.

Liam reveals that Wade has an engagement ring intended for her. Wade reveals that Liam had indeed stolen the money from Emily Dunn. He also reveals that Emily was still alive after her suicide attempt, but that Liam had left Emily to die in order to retrieve the money. Liam admits this and begins to justify that it was better that Emily was dead. June tearfully kills Liam in retaliation for his lies.

June burns the boat with the still living remains of Wade and Liam on board. She leaves using Liam's car. She laughs in disbelief when she finds the tape and reads the label, Vital Evidence by the Police.

She returns to the bridge carrying the basket containing the heads of Hank, Ned and Sal. She is met on the bridge by Gabby who is leaving town and her job with the Clausens behind. She offers June a lift out of town. June pushes the basket and axe off the bridge, leaving the still-living heads to their fate. Gabby realizes that June has been assaulted and reveals that she is the federal informant. Her full name is Gabriella and that she was normally called Ellie (L.E.). She made the decision to report Bobby Clausen for dealing in stolen historical artifacts due to the family's treatment of Emily leading to her suicide. June leaves the island behind with Ellie and the story concludes showing the axe laying on the ocean floor.

== Publication history ==
Joe Hill and Mark Doyle, the final editor at Vertigo, were talking about horror comics in general:

Then it hit me. I said to Mark, "Why don't we try doing that for comic books?" Can we have a studio for comic books that essentially does the same sort of thing that Blumhouse is doing for the screen? And he thought it was a pretty good idea, so we decided to go for it.

DC Comics began to discontinue Vertigo Comics. Two new imprints, DC Black Label and Hill House Comics, were introduced. Hill House Comics is overseen by Joe Hill, who announced the debut series Basketful of Heads. It was written by Hill, and pencilled by Leomacs and Reiko Murakami. The series was described as "Norse mythology and horror" by Hill.

The comic was released by DC Comics in October 2019, and sold over a million copies. On his interview with Polygon, he commented that:

Horror comics sold best. They sold the best in the 50s. The Comics now don't even sell one-tenth of how much Vault of Horror or Tales from the Crypt did sell. Of course, that was before Congress and psychologists joined forces to make comics boring again.
