= Rorschach (comic book) =

American comic book limited series (2020–2021)

- Cover A for issue #1 by Jorge Fornés

Publication information
- Publisher: DC Comics
- Schedule: October 13, 2020
- Format: Limited series
- Genre: Superhero
- Publication date: October 13, 2020 – September 14, 2021
- No. of issues: 12

Creative team
- Created by: Alan Moore
- Written by: Tom King
- Penciller: Jorge Fornés
- Letterer: Clayton Cowles
- Colorist: Dave Stewart
- Editor: James S. Rich

Rorschach is an American comic book limited series written by Tom King and drawn by Jorge Fornés, based on the character of the same name. The series is published by DC Comics under their DC Black Label imprint. Rorschach is one of two sequels to the comic book maxiseries Watchmen by Alan Moore and Dave Gibbons, the other being Doomsday Clock. Ignoring the events of Doomsday Clock, the comic is also tangentially and loosely linked to the 2019 television limited series by Damon Lindelof, set after its events. The standalone story analyzes the divisive cultural presence of Rorschach, a deranged superhero who died during the events of Watchmen, while a detective investigates a prolific assassination attempt.

== Premise ==
In 1985, deranged vigilante Walter Kovacs / Rorschach is killed by Doctor Manhattan while attempting to expose Ozymandias as the mastermind behind the "Squid"; a mutated psychic organism that kills half of the population of New York. The event inspires a tentative world peace under the illusion that an extraterrestrial attack is imminent. Thirty-five years later, Rorschach is the basis of many far right-wing conspiracy theories involving serving U.S. President Robert Redford, deceased superheroes and an alien invasion. An unnamed homicide detective investigates the crimes committed by Wil Myerson, a radicalized comic book artist who assumed the Rorschach mantle and was killed during the attempted assassination of a presidential candidate.

== Characters ==
- The Detective
- William "Wil" Myerson / Rorschach
- Laura Cummings / The Kid

== Reception ==
Issue #	Publication date	Critic rating	Critic reviews	Ref.
1	October 14, 2020	8.4/10	18	
2	November 17, 2020	8.3/10	13	
3	December 16, 2020	8.3/10	11	
4	January 20, 2021	8.3/10	13	
5	February 9, 2021	8.0/10	9	
6	March 9, 2021	8.6/10	8	
7	April 13, 2021	8.0/10	11	
8	May 11, 2021	8.5/10	10	
9	June 8, 2021	8.6/10	10	
10	July 13, 2021	8.2/10	10	
11	August 11, 2021	8.2/10	9	
12	September 15, 2021	7.9/10	8	
Overall		8.3/10	130	
