= Terminator Zero =

2024 science fiction animated series

Japanese name
- Kanji: ターミネーター ゼロ
Transcriptions
- Revised Hepburn: Tāminētā zero
- Genre: Science fiction; Action
- Based on: Terminator by: James Cameron; Gale Anne Hurd
- Developed by: Mattson Tomlin
- Showrunner: Mattson Tomlin
- Written by: Mattson Tomlin
- Directed by: Masashi Kudō
- Voices of: André Holland; Sonoya Mizuno; Sumalee Montano; Armani Jackson; Gideon Adlon; Carter Rockwood; Rosario Dawson; Timothy Olyphant
- Music by: Michelle Birsky; Kevin Henthorn
- Countries of origin: United States; Japan
- Original languages: English; Japanese
- No. of seasons: 1
- No. of episodes: 8

Production
- Executive producers: Mattson Tomlin; Rui Kuroki; David Ellison; Dana Goldberg; Don Granger
- Running time: 26–30 minutes
- Production companies: Production I.G; No Brakes; Skydance Television

Original release
- Network: Netflix
- Release: August 29, 2024

Terminator Zero (Japanese: ターミネーター ゼロ, Hepburn: Tāminētā zero) is a science fiction action anime series developed by Mattson Tomlin for Netflix. It is set in the Terminator universe created by James Cameron and Gale Anne Hurd. Animation services were provided by Production I.G under the direction of Masashi Kudō.

The eight-episode series premiered on August 29, 2024. In February 2026, the series was confirmed to have been canceled after one season.

== Premise ==
In 1997 Tokyo, Malcolm Lee is developing Kokoro, an AI system intended to compete with Skynet. The day before Judgment Day, Lee finds himself and his three children pursued by an unknown robot assassin and a mysterious soldier from the year 2022 has been sent to protect him.

== Voice cast and characters ==
=== Main ===
- Malcolm Lee (Voiced by: Yūya Uchida (Japanese); André Holland (English)): a scientist developing an AI that competes with Skynet
- Eiko (Voiced by: Toa Yukinari (Japanese); Sonoya Mizuno (English)): a resistance soldier sent from the year 2022 to protect Malcolm and his three kids from the Terminator and to prevent the Kokoro AI from being launched
- Misaki (Voiced by: Saori Hayami (Japanese); Sumalee Montano (English)): Malcolm's housekeeper and the sweet and protective babysitter of Malcolm's kids
- Kenta Lee (Voiced by: Hiro Shimono (Japanese); Armani Jackson (English)): Malcolm's elder son
- Reika Lee (Voiced by: Miyuki Sato (Japanese); Gideon Adlon (English)): Malcolm's daughter
- Hiro Lee (Voiced by: Shizuka Ishigami (Japanese); Carter Rockwood (English)): Malcolm's younger son
- Kokoro (Voiced by: Atsumi Tanezaki (Japanese); Rosario Dawson (English)): an AI developed by Malcolm Lee, created to counter Skynet
- The Terminator (Voiced by: Yasuhiro Mamiya (Japanese); Timothy Olyphant (English)): a cybernetic assassin sent back in time to eliminate Malcolm Lee

=== Supporting ===
- The Prophet (Voiced by: Mari Yokoo (Japanese); Ann Dowd (English)): the Resistance's spiritual and philosophical leader
- Ani / Annie (Voiced by: Ayaka Shimoyamada (Japanese); Julie Nathanson (English)): Eiko's fellow resistance soldier and roommate during the year 2022
- Natsuko (Voiced by: Yuka Keicho (Japanese); Vanessa Marshall (English)): a scientist working under Malcolm
- Fujino (Voiced by: Chō (Japanese); Fred Tatasciore (English)): a senior police detective
- Shiraki (Voiced by: Yōhei Azakami (Japanese); Nicolas Roye (English)): a young police detective and Fujino's partner

== Episodes ==
No.	Title	Directed by (Note: Refers to episode directors (演出), which are credited as "animation directors" in the credits. These are separate from the actual animation directors (作画監督), which are credited as "animation supervisors".)	Written by	Original release date
1	"Model 101"	Mineo Ōe	Mattson Tomlin	August 29, 2024
In a dystopian, post-apocalyptic 2022, Eiko fights a Terminator and hacks it to gather data on Skynet's plans, disabling it in the process. After escaping, she meets with the Prophet, leader of the Resistance, for a special mission. In an alternate 1997 Japan where robots are increasingly common, a workaholic Malcolm Lee neglects his three children, Kenta, Reika, and Hiro, to focus on an advanced AI system known as Kokoro, a competitor to Skynet. Despite working in the robotics industry, Malcolm objects to his housekeeper Misaki buying a robot cat for his children. Kenta resents his father for not spending enough time with him and his siblings.
2	"Model 102"	Haruka Tanaka	Mattson Tomlin	August 29, 2024
The Prophet enlists Eiko on a mission to travel back in time to 1997 to stop Malcolm from launching Kokoro. The Terminator that Eiko fought reactivates and raids the Resistance base, attacking numerous human survivors, including Annie. The time machine transports both Eiko and the Terminator to 1997 Japan. In 1997, Reika takes a liking to the robot cat, which leads her to an abandoned shopping mall. Her brothers Kenta and Hiro follow without informing Misaki, who panics. Elsewhere, Malcolm discusses the threat posed by Skynet with Kokoro. Kokoro, however, researches human history and deems humanity unworthy, similar to Skynet. Malcolm and Misaki search for the children but encounter a Terminator, who has been sent back through time on a mission to kill Malcolm and his children. Misaki is separated from Malcolm and encounters Eiko, who warns her about the importance of Malcolm's children to the future timeline.
3	"Model 103"	Shigeki Hatakeyama	Mattson Tomlin	August 29, 2024
At his workplace, Malcolm continues to communicate with Kokoro, trying to convince the AI program that humanity is worth saving. While Malcolm admits that he cannot name any time in history when humanity lived in peace, he speaks of the human will to survive. Misaki tends to the wounded Eiko and learns about the dystopian future unleashed by Malcolm's Kokoro AI system. Meanwhile, Kenta discovers several decommissioned robots in the abandoned shopping mall, which he sets about reprogramming. While searching for the robot cat, Reika and Hiro encounter the Terminator, who attempts to kill them, but is stopped by Eiko. The Terminator incapacitates Kenta, when he comes to defend his siblings. Eiko, the children, and Misaki flee to a nearby subway station with the Terminator in pursuit. Misaki and the boys are separated from Eiko and Reika.
4	"Model 104"	Tomomi Takeuchi	Mattson Tomlin	August 29, 2024
Eiko and Reika flee in a stolen police car, pursued by Japanese police. Reika and Eiko hide in an office building, which is under siege by a SWAT team. At Eiko's urging, Reika tries to call her father, Malcolm, but he is preoccupied with Kokoro. The SWAT team overpowers Eiko and takes the two to a hospital. Misaki, Kenta, and Hiro take refuge in a police station. The police chief is unable to find any identification to prove Misaki's existence. The Terminator attacks the police station, killing several policemen and detectives. During the fight, it rips off Misaki's arm, exposing her as an android. Misaki and the boys escape. Meanwhile, Skynet activates and launches several nuclear strikes across the Western Hemisphere and much of Asia, causing massive casualties. With little choice, Malcolm activates Kokoro.
5	"Model 105"	Shigeki Hatakeyama	Mattson Tomlin	August 29, 2024
Following Kokoro's launch, the decommissioned robots in the mall activate and use violent force to subdue the Japanese population, overpowering the Japanese Self-Defense Force. Eiko and Reika arrive at the hospital only to be caught up in the robot uprising, which they escape. Misaki and the boys flee to a garbage dump. While Kenta initially rejects Misaki for being an android, Hiro is more understanding. Misaki is able to convince him and Hiro that she only serves Malcolm. Kokoro tells Malcolm and the Japanese population that she can protect them from Skynet on the condition that they submit to her. She justifies her violent takeover as a response to the enslavement of robots in science fiction literature.
6	"Model 106"	Mineo Ōe	Mattson Tomlin	August 29, 2024
In 2022, the Prophet explains the paradox of time travel to Eiko—although time proceeds in a straight line, whenever a human or machine travels back in time, a new timeline is created. Malcolm shares the painful memory of his wife's death with Kokoro. Misaki and the boys head to Cat Town theme park, their mother's favorite place, to meet Reika and Eiko. Kenta threatens Misaki when he sees her kill several people to protect Hiro, but relents and they proceed to Cat Town, where the Terminator abducts Kenta by impersonating Reika's voice. While Eiko is initially hostile towards Misaki for being a machine, Reika convinces Eiko that Misaki can be trusted.
7	"Model 107"	Haruka Tanaka	Mattson Tomlin	August 29, 2024
Kokoro gets Malcolm to admit that he's from the future. In flashbacks, it is revealed that in Malcolm's timeline, he grew up ostracized for suggesting changing the nature of machines. This led him to create Misaki, and together, they traveled back to 1983 from the post-apocalyptic future to create Kokoro, sacrificing Misaki's memories in the process. He found work with Cortex and used his knowledge of robotics to build Kokoro. Through Kokoro's network of robots, he learns that Reika, Hiro, and Misaki are safe and have linked up with Eiko. The Terminator brings a captive Kenta to force Malcolm out of hiding.
8	"Model 108"	Masashi Kudō; Yuta Maruyama	Mattson Tomlin	August 29, 2024
Eiko engages in a fierce fight with the Terminator, during which her hand is crushed by the Terminator, ending with Malcolm being fatally stabbed. As he dies, he reveals that Eiko is his mother in his timeline. Kokoro finally decides to defend humanity from Skynet. The Terminator drags Kenta to the facility's EMP, telling him that in the future, Kenta will broker peace with Skynet and send the Terminator back to destroy Kokoro. As the Terminator is destroyed fighting Kokoro's robots, Kenta is left with the choice to activate the EMP. Upon being told that Skynet would attack again, Kenta ultimately chooses to spare Kokoro before going into hiding with Reika, Hiro, Eiko, and Misaki.

== Production ==
An anime series set in the Terminator universe was first announced in February 2021. The anime was produced for Netflix by animation studio Production I.G and Skydance Television, coming from showrunner Mattson Tomlin and director Masashi Kudō. The show further developed with the working title Terminator: The Anime Series as revealed by Netflix in its 2023 Geeked Week when it announced the premise of following new characters in the year 1997.

The scripts were originally written in English by Tomlin, then translated to Japanese, which was the language used for the animation. The dialogue was then rewritten by Tomlin to fit the animation in Japanese for the English dub.

Tomlin has stated that the series treats all of the prior films as canon, and Production I.G. requested that it have some kind of Japanese component. The decision was made to set the story in Japan, which introduces cultural differences, such as lesser availability of firearms to civilians. Tomlin has also stated that he wants the series to last for five seasons, mentioning that future seasons would focus on Malcolm's children as "they grow up through this war that eventually evolves into the future war" and how their views on humans and machines change and become "radically different from each other".

In February 2026, Tomlin confirmed that the series had been canceled after one season. While they had planned for two further seasons, Tomlin stated that the lack of viewership did not justify renewal.

=== Casting ===
By June 2024, Timothy Olyphant was cast to voice the Terminator for the series, and additional character photos were first revealed with the voices of Rosario Dawson, André Holland, Sonoya Mizuno, and Ann Dowd.

== Release ==
On August 6, 2024, all eight episodes of the series were leaked online before its official release. On August 29, 2024, the series was released on Netflix, coinciding with the in-universe date of Judgment Day.

== Reception ==
=== Critical response ===
The series received positive reviews from critics. On the review aggregator website Rotten Tomatoes, 87% of 30 critics' reviews are positive, with an average rating of 7.3/10. The website's consensus reads: "Shedding the skin of past Terminator incarnations to tell a sophisticated sci-fi saga of its own, this visceral anime proves its mettle." Metacritic, which uses a weighted average, assigned the film a score of 69 out of 100, based on 11 critics, indicating "generally favorable" reviews.
