= BRZRKR: Poetry of Madness =

2023 comic book

- BRZRKR: Poetry of Madness Cover

Publication information
- Publisher: Boom! Studios
- Format: Limited series
- Genre: Supernatural; Action
- Publication date: July 26, 2023
- No. of issues: 1
- Main character: B (Unute)

Creative team
- Written by: Keanu Reeves; Steve Skroce
- Artist: Steve Skroce
- Letterer: Ed Dukeshire
- Colorist: Dave Stewart
- Editor: Matt Gagnon

Collected editions
- BRZRKR: Bloodlines Vol. 1: ISBN 978-1939867780

BRZRKR: Poetry of Madness is a one-shot spin-off issue of the BRZRKR comic book series, telling the story of B's time as the guardian of Atlantis and protector of its ruler, King Azaes, how he came to be in this position, why he feels so strongly about the king, and the events that led to him leaving Atlantis in the end (although in this story B is known as Unute). It was written by Keanu Reeves and Steve Skroce, with art by Skorce and colors by Dave Stewart. It was published on July 26, 2023, by Boom! Studios to positive reviews.

== Plot ==
The story follows Unute (also known as B or Berserker), a powerful immortal Half-human Half-God warrior with extraordinary regenerative abilities, and his centuries old struggle with an uncontrollable urge that forces him to commit unspeakable acts of carnage and violence, an urge that must and will be met at all costs.

After a fateful chance encounter with the young prince of Atlantis convinces him to safeguard the boy and the advanced ancient realm from the numerous threats and foe's attracted to it by its many riches and wonders, Unute becomes the sole protector of Atlantis, brutally exerting his unquenchable need for bloodshed on all invading enemies of the city.

The innocent young prince, now a grown but sickly king, corrupted and misguided by the years of security and bliss provided by Unute's violent devotion to protecting him, and his interactions with an ancient cult who together with the king, plan to trap Unute with the intention of replicating his immortality, and opening the gates to another dimension to free Cthulhu—a massive unspeakable monster, spelling a disastrous and tragic end for the legendary city, one beyond even Unute's ability to save.

== Reception ==
CBR gave the issue a positive review, saying, "BRZRKR: Poetry of Madness #1 never pretends to be anything it isn't. The book doesn't try to position itself as a highbrow epic fantasy or thought-provoking social commentary competing for an Eisner Award. Instead, it is all about how far it can take the intensity of the action and present Berserker as even more of a butt-kicking hero than he already is. Much like how most people feel toward Reeves, it's hard not to fall in love with the honesty of it all."

Screen Rant's Andrew Firestone praised the issue, saying "Keanu Reeves and the rest of the creative team manages to weave a satisfying prequel that delivers on the promise of the immortal warrior, B." Firestone called the comic "visually fantastic" and praised the "human" portrayal of B, opining "Reeves and Skorce do a superb job in reconstructing this particular type of character in full complexity".

Reviewing for Comicon.com, Anton Kromoff also gave the issue a positive appraisal, likening it as "sword and sorcery [..] meets John Wick in a really fun way". Kromoff felt that the comic appealed to "[those who] play D&D, read fantasy books, or are into high-fantasy blood baths."
