= Little Fish (2020 film) =

2021 film by Chad Hartigan

- Theatrical release poster
- Directed by: Chad Hartigan
- Screenplay by: Mattson Tomlin
- Based on: "Little Fish" by Aja Gabel
- Produced by: Lia Buman; Rian Cahill; Tim Headington; Brian Kavanaugh-Jones; Mattson Tomlin
- Starring: Olivia Cooke; Jack O'Connell; Raúl Castillo; Soko
- Cinematography: Sean McElwee
- Edited by: Josh Crockett
- Music by: Keegan DeWitt
- Production companies: Automatik; Black Bear Pictures; Tango Entertainment; Oddfellows Entertainment
- Distributed by: IFC Films (North America); Stage 6 Films (International)
- Release dates: October 1, 2020 (Newport Beach Film Festival); February 5, 2021 (United States)
- Running time: 101 minutes
- Country: United States
- Language: English
- Box office: $39,053

Little Fish is a 2020 American science fiction romantic drama film directed by Chad Hartigan and written by Mattson Tomlin, based on the 2011 short story of the same name by Aja Gabel. It stars Olivia Cooke, Jack O'Connell, Raúl Castillo, and Soko.

It was released on February 5, 2021, by IFC Films.

== Premise ==
A couple fights to hold their relationship together as a memory loss virus spreads and threatens to erase the history of their love and courtship.

== Cast ==
- Olivia Cooke as Emma Ryerson
- Jack O'Connell as Jude Williams
- Raúl Castillo as Benjamin “Ben” Richards
- Soko as Samantha

== Production ==
In March 2019, it was announced that Chad Hartigan would direct a film adaptation of Aja Gabel's short story "Little Fish", with Mattson Tomlin writing the screenplay, and Olivia Cooke, Jack O'Connell, Raúl Castillo and Soko starring. Brian Kavanaugh-Jones, Rian Cahill, Tim Headington, Lia Buman, Chris Ferguson and Tomlin were set to produce the film, while Cooke, Fred Berger, Teddy Schwarzman, Ben Stillman, Michael Heimler and Max Silva would serve as executive producers under their Black Bear Pictures, Automatik, Tango Entertainment and Oddfellows Entertainment banners, respectively.

Principal photography took place from March 11 to April 12, 2019, in British Columbia, Canada.

== Release ==
It was scheduled to have its world premiere at the Tribeca Film Festival on April 17, 2020. However, the festival was postponed due to the COVID-19 pandemic. In September 2020, IFC Films acquired North American distribution rights to the film and released it in theaters on February 5, 2021. Stage 6 Films also acquired international distribution rights to the film.

== Reception ==
Review aggregator Rotten Tomatoes gives the film a 91% approval rating based on 80 reviews, with an average rating of 7.3/10. The website's critics consensus reads: "Tough but stirring, Little Fish uses one couple's pandemic love story to illustrate the strength of human connection in trying times." According to Metacritic, which sampled eleven critics and calculated a weighted average score of 71 out of 100, the film received "generally favorable" reviews.
