= BRZRKR =

American comic book series

- BRZRKR Issue 1 Cover

Publication information
- Publisher: Boom! Studios
- Format: Limited series
- Genre: Action; Supernatural; Sci Fi
- Publication date: March 3, 2021
- No. of issues: 12
- Main characters: B (Called "Unute", which means "tool" or "weapon", by his kind); Dr. Diana Ahuja

Creative team
- Created by: Keanu Reeves; Matt Kindt
- Written by: Keanu Reeves; Matt Kindt
- Artist: Ron Garney
- Letterer: Clem Robins
- Colorist: Bill Crabtree
- Editor: Matt Gagnon

Collected editions
- BRZRKR Vol. 1: ISBN 978-1684156856
- BRZRKR Vol. 2: ISBN 978-1684158157
- BRZRKR Vol. 3: ISBN 978-1684157129
- BRZRKR Deluxe Edition: ISBN 979-8892150521

BRZRKR is a comic book series created and written by Keanu Reeves and Matt Kindt, and illustrated by Ron Garney. The comic follows an immortal half-human, half-god warrior, known as "B." Compelled to violence, he has fought and killed his way through the ages, but now works for the U.S. Government completing missions too violent and dangerous for anyone else.

The first issue of the 12-issue limited series was published on March 3, 2021, by Boom! Studios. It raised more than US$1.4 million in its funding campaign on Kickstarter. The series was initially announced to be illustrated by Alessandro Vitti, but this was later changed as the art was handled by Garney instead.

== Plot ==
BRZRKR follows a mysterious, immortal warrior known only as B, a man who has lived for over 80,000 years, gifted—or perhaps cursed—with superhuman strength and speed, godlike regenerative abilities, and an uncontrollable urge to commit unspeakable acts of carnage and violence. In the present day, B works as a weapon for the U.S. government, undertaking black-ops missions too dangerous for normal soldiers. In exchange, they promise to help him unlock the secrets of his origin—and grant him the one thing he wants the most, the ability to finally die.

As B endures each brutal mission, his body quickly regenerates from horrific damage, but the many psychological scars of his unending violent life remain. Between operations for the US government, he's studied and counseled by Dr. Diana Ahuja, a government scientist who seeks to unravel the mystery of his biology and mind. Through her therapy sessions, they develop a strong connection, and B begins to recount his origins: he was born in prehistoric times to a human mother who prayed for a weapon to protect her nomadic tribe from surrounding oppressors, and the being of cosmic energy she prayed to, who impregnated her with B instead, granting them an undying living weapon with monstrous, uncontrollable rage.

From conception, B was very different from the average human. He spent only two months in his mother's womb before birth, his body developed, grew, and healed incredibly fast, and he killed violently without remorse making his people refer to him as Unute which means weapon or tool. This only reinforced and convinced his surrogate father to raise and train him as the tool of war they prayed for to protect their tribe from the relentlessness and savagery of the larger tribes and villages that surrounded them, sending him into battle where he slaughtered and dismembered enemies in increasingly gruesome ways. Eventually, his surrogate father's greed and desire for conquest eventually lead to the tragic demise of B's mother, and their entire tribe. After this, B wandered the Earth alone for centuries, fighting in countless wars, toppling empires, and inspiring a cult-like following of people who revered, manipulated, and followed him for ages, passing their ways and knowledge from one generation to the next. They sought to gain his abilities by all means, and have been trying, but failing for centuries. B was unable to procreate and lost loved ones who aged and died while he remained unchanged. The weight of his curse grew heavier with time, leading him to strongly desire a way to end his suffering and finally die.

In the present, the U.S. government, led by a high-ranking influential figure called Caldwell (revealed to be a member of the above-mentioned ancient cult), who seemed to understand the full extent of B's abilities and his importance to humanity's advancement over the ages, continued to use B as a living weapon, while attempting to replicate his DNA to build immortal super-soldiers. B is fully aware of this, but remains indifferent to their intention as long as they could find a way to make him mortal. Together with Dr. Ahuja, B begins to uncover his true origin by confronting his repressed memories and emotions about his mother's death, and using a special device to harness his innate energy and connect with the cosmic being responsible for B's creation—his father. This brief connection reveals the location of his birth and an artifact his father gave to his mother before her death, one capable of permanently ridding B of his abilities and making him mortal. Through her close connection with B, Diana also connects with the cosmic entity, granting her abilities of her own, and a psychic connection to B.

B reveals the location of the artifact, heading there with the US military, Caldwell, and Diana. Utilizing their psychic connection to navigate B's memories, he and Diana find the artifact which he activates, summoning a massive bolt of energy from outer space to their location. The U.S. military taps this energy from orbit back to their secret base using a satellite. Caldwell's machinations come to light as he orchestrates events to transfer B's abilities to himself, and Diana activates her psychic connection to B, once again linking to the cosmic entity in an attempt to understand its intention. The climax unfolds with Caldwell, now imbued with B's former abilities. Now overcome with the urge to kill, he initiates an assault on the surrounding US military officials and B. Despite his newfound mortality, B confronts Caldwell, leading to a decisive battle. Diana's intervention proves crucial, as she utilizes her new powers to aid B in overcoming Caldwell's threat.

== Development and publication history ==
Keanu Reeves' BRZRKR began in 2020 as an original comic series conceived by Reeves and writer Matt Kindt. The two planned it as a 12‐issue action saga about an immortal half‐god warrior, and partnered with Boom! Studios to publish it. To fund the project, Boom! ran a Kickstarter campaign in mid‑2020, hoping for $50,000. The campaign ultimately raised over $1.4 million, and set a new record as the highest‑funded comic book campaign on Kickstarter at the time. This fan support helped guarantee Boom! could produce and distribute the series alongside its usual channels.

The creative team was announced shortly thereafter. Reeves co‑writes the comic with Kindt, and Boom! assembled a veteran art team to match. Originally the art duties had been assigned to newcomer Alessandro Vitti, but before publication Boom! replaced Vitti with long‑time Marvel and DC penciller Ron Garney. Colorist Bill Crabtree and letterer Clem Robins were also named as part of the core creative lineup. Reeves later noted in interviews that he and Kindt had already completed scripts for the first four issues before Garney came on board, after which Garney began illustrating the series. In this way, the project combined Reeves' story ideas with Kindt's scripting and Garney's art, under editor Matt Gagnon at Boom!.

BRZRKR's publication schedule evolved over time. The series was originally solicited for an October 2020 debut, but when Garney joined the production late in the process Boom! announced a delay. The first issue was rescheduled to reach comic shops on February 17, 2021 (cover-dated March 2021). From there the series rolled out at roughly bi‑monthly intervals through early 2023. In total twelve issues were released, with the final issue hitting stores in March 2023. Boom! began collecting the issues into trade paperbacks as they came out: the first four issues were gathered into a paperback volume (BRZRKR Vol. 1) published in September 2021. A deluxe omnibus edition of all 12 issues was later announced, scheduled for 2024.

Issue #1 became one of the biggest comic debuts in decades, selling roughly 615,000 copies to comic shops. That number required a second printing and led Boom! to describe the issue as "the highest‑selling original comic book launch in nearly 30 years". Sales remained strong after the first issue: by comparison, orders for BRZRKR #2 were about 148,000 – which Bleeding Cool considered "impressive", considering that #2 had fewer retail incentives and variant covers than #1. Over its run the series shipped more than one million copies. In short, BRZRKR's Kickstarter success and its record‑breaking sales made it one of Boom! Studios' most notable creator‑owned series.

== Reception and sales ==
Issue #1 sold over 615,000 copies, making it the top-selling single issue since Star Wars #1 in 2015.

The complete 12-issue original series of BRZRKR and the 4 one-shot releases have a collective average critic score of 7.1 out of 10 for 77 reviews, and an average user score of 8.6 out of 10 for 383 reviews on the review aggregator website Comic Book Roundup.

PER-ISSUE SALES (DIAMOND INDEXES)
Issue	On-Sale Date	Estimated units shipped (Diamond)	Ref.
#1	March 3, 2021	321,184	
#2	April 28, 2021	113,565	
#3	June 16, 2021	85,743	
#4	July 28, 2021	69,173	
#5	September 29, 2021	Unavailable	N/A
#6	November 17, 2021	Unavailable	N/A
#7	January 26, 2022	Unavailable	N/A
#8	March 30, 2022	Unavailable	N/A
#9	June 29, 2022	Unavailable	N/A
#10	September 28, 2022	Unavailable	N/A
#11	December 21, 2022	Unavailable	N/A
#12	March 15, 2023	Unavailable	N/A

== Collected editions ==
Collections of BRZRKR
Title	Material collected	Published date	ISBN
BRZRKR Vol. 1	BRZRKR #1–4	November 2021	978-1684156856
BRZRKR Vol. 2	BRZRKR #5–8	September 2022	978-1684158157
BRZRKR Vol. 3	BRZRKR #9–12	October 2023	978-1684157129
BRZRKR Deluxe Edition	BRZRKR #1–12	September 25, 2024	979-8892150521

== Adaptations and spin-offs ==
BRZRKR
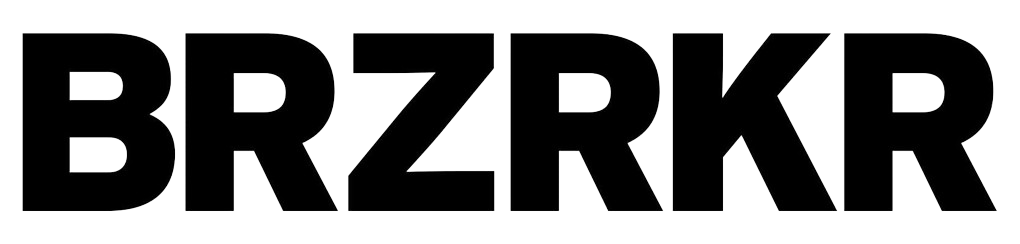
- Official logo (2021-present)
- Created by: Keanu Reeves
- Original work: BRZRKR Vol. 1 (2021)
- Owner: Keanu Reeves
- Years: 2021–present

Print publications
- Book: The Book of Elsewhere (2024)
- Comics: BRZRKR (2021–2023); Poetry of Madness (2023); Fallen Empire (2023); A Faceful of Bullets (2024); The Lost Book of B (2024)

BRZRKR is a print media and planned film and television franchise created by Keanu Reeves and developed by Boom! Studios. Beginning with the first titular comic book run in 2021, the series has expanded to include four one-shot spin-off issues and a novel written by Reeves and speculative fiction author China Miéville. At Netflix, a feature film produced by and starring Reeves and written by Mattson Tomlin is in development, as well as a two-season anime series with Tomlin as showrunner.

=== Film ===
On March 22, 2021, Netflix announced it was developing a live-action film adaptation and a follow-up anime series based on the comics with Reeves cast as the lead. In October 2021, Mattson Tomlin was writing the live-action film adaptation. In March 2025, it was announced Justin Lin would direct and produce the film. Tomlin completed the script in September 2022.

Adam Yoelin is set to executive produce the film through Boom! Studios. Reeves stated that once he had finished reading the script, there was "a 33% chance" he would direct the film himself. Reeves commented on the possibility of him directing, saying

"I know how it's a lot of work, but the film that I directed, Man of Tai Chi, was born, I became the director because I was part of the writing process, and I didn't want to hand it over. I was like, oh, okay. I have to direct this. I'm not quite there yet on ‘BRZRKR’. I have to read the script, but I'm also interested in having a collaborator and what they could bring to it.

By the time Penguin Random House announced its acquisition of Boom! Studios in July 2024, the project was confirmed to remain in development. That month at San Diego Comic-Con, Tomlin revealed he had turned in another draft of the script.

In March 2025, it was announced that Justin Lin would direct the film.

=== Anime series ===
In July 2022, during Reeves's panel at San Diego Comic-Con 2022, it was announced that the anime series adaptation will be produced by Production I.G and have two seasons. Reeves will reprise his voice role as 'B'.

At San Diego Comic-Con 2024, Mattson Tomlin was announced to be the showrunner for the project, with production set to begin in the fall.

=== Bloodlines Vol. 1 ===
On July 26, 2023, Boom! Studios released BRZRKR: Poetry of Madness, written by Reeves and Steve Skroce, to be the first issue in the first volume of the Bloodlines series. It has art by Skroce and colors by Dave Stewart. Cover variant artists include Travis Charest, David Aja, and David W. Mack. CBR gave the issue a positive review, saying, "BRZRKR: Poetry of Madness #1 never pretends to be anything it isn't. The book doesn't try to position itself as a highbrow epic fantasy or thought-provoking social commentary competing for an Eisner Award. Instead, it is all about how far it can take the intensity of the action and present Berserker as even more of a butt-kicking hero than he already is. Much like how most people feel toward Reeves, it's hard not to fall in love with the honesty of it all."

On November 29, 2023, Boom! Studios released BRZRKR: Fallen Empire, written by Reeves and Mattson Tomlin, to be the second issue in the first volume of the Bloodlines series. It has art by Rebekah Isaacs and colors by Dee Cuniffe, titled The comic had cover variants by Joëlle Jones, Jenny Frison, and Yanick Paquette. CBR praised the issue, calling it "[It is] as beautiful as it is tragic, BRZRKR: Fallen Empire #1 demonstrates the true series potential of this young franchise." Reviewer Hannah Rose specifically praised Cuniffe's colors, calling them "spectacular", and likened the comic to a "Victorian novel". Alex Zalben and Justin Tyler of comicbookclublive.com gave the run positive reviews, with Tyler likening the portrayal of 'B' to a "feature film version of the character", and comparing the story of the issue to The Mummy (1999). Zalben said he was at first "bummed" that original series co-writer Matt Kindt and original artist Ron Garney weren't involved, but said he ended up liking the comic regardless, praising the "surprising amount of important mythology" in the issue. It is set in a fictional desert empire, Olos, where B. finds love and is manipulated, was released on November 29, 2023. The comic had cover variants by Joëlle Jones, Jenny Frison, and Yanick Paquette.

In October 2023, Boom! Studios announced the first compilation issue of the first volume of the Bloodlines run, which includes Poetry of Madness and Fallen Empire. It was released on March 27, 2024.

=== Bloodlines Vol. 2 ===
In October 2023, Boom! Studios announced the first volume of the "Bloodlines" spin-off run, written by Reeves and Tomlin and illustrated by Skroce. It was released on March 27, 2024.

In February 2024, writer Jason Aaron was revealed to be writing a "standalone Western story" for the "Bloodlines" run of the series with artist Salvador Larroca, titled BRZRKR: A Faceful of Bullets. It was released on July 24, 2024.

A new one-shot spinoff by Reeves, Kindt, Garney, and Bill Crabtree titled BRZRKR: THE LOST BOOK OF B following B.'s time serving as the ultimate weapon of the warlord Genghis Khan, released on August 21, 2024.

The second volume of the BRZRKR: Bloodlines spinoff series co-written by Reeves, Kindt, & Jason Aaron, and Illustrated by Garney & Salvador Larroca released on December 18, 2024. It collects BRZRKR: The Lost Book of B, and BRZRKR: A Face Full of Bullets.

=== Novel ===
In January 2024, in an interview on Good Morning America, Reeves announced that he was co-authoring a new book with speculative fiction writer China Miéville titled The Book of Elsewhere. The book takes place in an alternate universe to Reeves's comic book series BRZRKR, and was released on July 23, 2024 by Del Rey Books and Boom! Studios.
