= The Nice House =

Comic book series

The Nice House...
- Cover of the deluxe edition of The Nice House on the Lake, art by Álvaro Martínez Bueno.

Publication information
- Publisher: DC Black Label (2021–2024); Vertigo Comics (2024–present)
- Schedule: Monthly
Title(s)
- The Nice House on the Lake
- The Nice House by the Sea
- Formats: Original material for the series has been published as a set of limited series.
- Genre: Horror, post-apocalyptic
- Publication date: 2021 – present
- Number of issues: 20

Creative team
- Writer(s): James Tynion IV
- Artist(s): Álvaro Martínez Bueno
- Letterer(s): Andworld Design
- Colorist(s): Jordie Bellaire

The Nice House on the Lake and The Nice House by the Sea are two post-apocalyptic horror comic book limited series created by writer James Tynion IV and artist Álvaro Martínez Bueno, and published by DC Comics through their Black Label imprint and since 2024, their Vertigo imprint.

The Nice House on the Lake debuted on June 1, 2021, and concluded on December 27, 2022. This first series focuses on the mysterious Walter, who invites ten (Note: Later revealed to be eleven.) of his friends to an idyllic house in the countryside, only for them to witness the end of the world and be told they are not allowed to leave. The series received critical acclaim, winning four Eisner Awards including the 2022 award for Best New Series.

A second "cycle" in the same setting, The Nice House by the Sea, began on July 24, 2024. This series follows a different household consisting of exemplary humans selected by Max, another member of Walter's species. In October 2024, DC relaunched their Vertigo imprint and began publishing some Black Label titles, including The Nice House by the Sea, as Vertigo titles.

== Synopsis ==
=== The Nice House on the Lake ===
The enigmatic Walter invites ten of his close friends and acquaintances to spend a week at an opulent lake house, initially believed to be in Wisconsin. On the group's first night at the house, they discover to their horror that the outside world is ending.

Walter reveals that he is part of an alien species who intend to destroy the Earth and study the ten humans inside the house. He explains to the terrified group that they can live without want in this house forever, but they can never leave. As time passes, the group discovers that not only will anything they request be delivered to them, but they can no longer die or even be injured. The group then starts to see their idyllic existence as a gilded cage, and resolve to uncover the truth about Walter and the house – and maybe even save what is left of the world.

=== The Nice House by the Sea ===
The second "cycle" follows Max, another enigmatic figure who has handpicked a group to live in a beautiful house in a Mediterranean setting after the end of the world. In contrast to Walter's group of friends (accomplished professionals in their own right, but chosen by Walter out of personal affection), the members of Max's group have attained some of the highest positions and awards in their respective fields, but were not personally connected before arriving at the house.

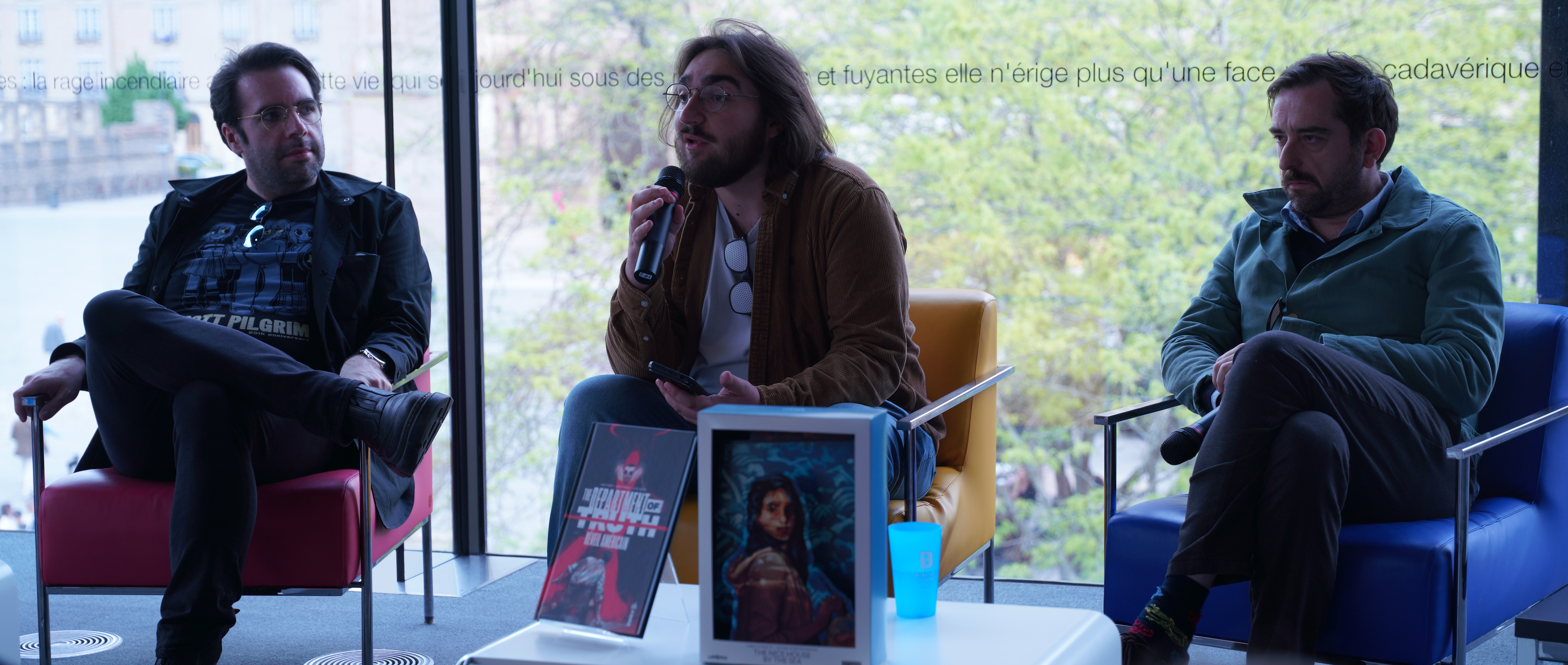
French tour, The Nice House by the Sea

== Characters ==
In issue #10 of The Nice House on the Lake, Walter reveals that he (and by implication, Max and others of their species) was tasked with identifying and preserving ten exceptional human beings who embody different core aspects of humanity. Where the in-text description of a character varies from the "core aspects", it is given in parentheses.

Characters
Aspect	The Nice House on the Lake	The Nice House by the Sea
(the alien)	Walter	Max
The Artist	Ryan Cane (The Artist), the youngest and newest selection, with the fewest connections to other members of the group Reginald Madison (The Painter), high-school friend of Walter (Note: It is revealed in issue #10 that Walter had initially invited Reg as the Artist of the group and even involved him in designing the house and its surroundings. When Reg learned of Walter's plans and resisted, Walter replaced him with Ryan in the house but kept Reg isolated elsewhere on the premises.)	Soko Tanaka, MacArthur Fellow
The Writer	Norah Jakobs, (Note: A trans woman, referred to as "Norm" in high school flashback scenes.) high-school friend of Walter	Victor Pace, Hugo and Nebula Award winner
The Actor	David Daye (The Comedian), college friend of Walter	Oliver Landon Clay, Tony Award winner, high-school friend of Walter
The Mathematician	Molly Reynolds (The Accountant), high-school friend of Veronica	Bob Washington, award-winning mathematics teacher
The Scientist	Veronica Wright, former high-school girlfriend of Norah, NASA astronomer	Quinn Thomas, Nobel Prize–winning geneticist
The Historian	Sam Nguyen (The Reporter), high-school friend of Walter, partner of Arturo	Henry Allan, Pulitzer Prize winner
The Person of Faith	Arturo Perez (The Acupuncturist), partner of Sam	Freddie Beaumont (The Priest), Provincial Superior of the Society of Jesus
The Politician	Sarah Radnitz (The Consultant), college friend of Walter, member of the Democratic National Committee	Margaret Collins (The Senator), United States Senator
The Doctor	Naya Rada, wife of Rick (Note: Naya dies in issue #10, leaving the house with the "correct" number of occupants, but with two Artists and no Doctor.)	Hector Aguilar, Nobel Prize winner
The Musician	Rick MacEwan (The Pianist), college friend of Walter, husband of Naya	Cherri Campbell (The Singer), Grammy and Emmy Award winner

== Reception ==
=== Awards and nominations ===
Award nominations for The Nice House on the Lake
Year	Organization	Award	Result	Ref.
2022	Harvey Awards	Book of the Year	Nominated	
2022	Eisner Awards	Best New Series	Won	
2022	Eisner Awards	Best Writer	Won	
2023	Eisner Awards	Best Writer	Won	
2023	Eisner Awards	Best Continuing Series	Nominated	
2023	Eisner Awards	Best Penciller/Inker or Penciller/Inker Team	Nominated	
2023	Eisner Awards	Best Coloring	Won	
2023	GLAAD Media Awards	Outstanding Comic Book	Nominated	
2024	Angoulême International Comics Festival	Prize for a Series	Won	

Award nominations for The Nice House by the Sea
Year	Organization	Award	Result	Ref.
2025	GLAAD Media Awards	Outstanding Comic Book	Nominated	

== Collected editions ==
Collected editions of The Nice House...
Title	Material collected	Format	Publication date	ISBN
The Nice House on the Lake: Volume 1	The Nice House on the Lake #1–6	Trade paperback	March 1, 2022	ISBN 978-1779514349
The Nice House on the Lake: Volume 2	The Nice House on the Lake #7-12	Trade paperback	March 7, 2023	ISBN 978-1779517401
The Nice House on the Lake: Deluxe Edition	The Nice House on the Lake #1–12	Hardcover	October 24, 2023	ISBN 978-1779521576
The Nice House by the Sea: Volume 1	The Nice House by the Sea #1–6	Trade paperback	March 4, 2025	ISBN 978-1799500605
