= BRZRKR: Fallen Empire =

2023 comic book

- BRZRKR: Fallen Empire Cover

Publication information
- Publisher: Boom! Studios
- Format: Limited series
- Genre: Supernatural; Action
- Publication date: November 29, 2023
- No. of issues: 1
- Main character: B. (Unute)

Creative team
- Written by: Keanu Reeves; Mattson Tomlin
- Artist: Rebekah Isaacs
- Letterer: Becca Carey
- Colorist: Dee Cuniffe
- Editor: Matt Gagnon

Collected editions
- BRZRKR: Bloodlines Vol. 1: ISBN 978-1939867780

BRZRKR: Fallen Empire is a one-shot spin-off issue of the BRZRKR comic book series. It tells the story of B (short for Berserker), an immortal half-human half-god warrior compelled to commit unspeakable acts of violence and carnage, and his time in the Olos Empire, where he experienced romance and destruction. It was co-written by Keanu Reeves and Mattson Tomlin, with art by Rebekah Isaacs and colors by Dee Cuniffe. BRZRKR was published by Boom! Studios on November 29, 2023. It is set in the BRZRKR universe.

== Synopsis ==
Set in the thriving Desert kingdom of Olos, a city currently at war with its neighboring kingdoms and ruled by a violent king and his beautiful cunning queen. The immortal B is captured and imprisoned by the king who upon witnessing the un-dying B's abilities and potential for carnage and destruction seeks to use him to wipe out his enemies.

B refuses and remains imprisoned until he is freed by the queen who confesses to also being a prisoner in her relationship with the king. They escape together, finding shelter in the desert where they slowly fall in love and confide in each other, with the queen revealing the history of her original homeland, her tribe's people, and how she came to be with the king of Olos.

After the queen is apprehended by her people, an enraged B returns to Olos to find out where she was taken. There, the king of Olos reveals that her people are in league with his neighboring enemy kingdom, the Washukanni. B unleashes the Berserker and brutally obliterates the king's enemies reuniting with his beloved, only to later discover that he was manipulated and used. This pushes B to make a decision that would lead to even more death and cataclysm, a decision that would change the face of the entire desert forever.

== Background ==
Co-writer Mattson Tomlin said that working on the issue was a "surreal honor" and called it "a delight to play in the world Keanu, Matt, Ron, Bill, Clem and BOOM! have created!"

== Reception ==
The issue received positive reviews. CBR praised the comic, declaring "[It is] as beautiful as it is tragic, BRZRKR: Fallen Empire #1 demonstrates the true series potential of this young franchise." Reviewer Hannah Rose specifically praised Cuniffe's colors, calling them "spectacular", and likened the comic to a "Victorian novel".

Review aggregator website ComicbookRoundup.com gave the series positive reviews, gaining an average score of 9.2 from 4 critics. Brett from Graphic Policy gave a score of 8.8/10 for his review, saying "BRZRKR: Fallen Empire #1 is another great entry in the series and adds to the story of B. While I initially rolled my eyes at what felt like a movie/tv pitch, I'm actively excited to see it move to that and hopefully expand the world further. Even if you don't know the story of B, BRZRKR: Fallen Empire #1 is a comic to check out and it very well might get you excited to learn more and see what you missed."

Alex Zalben and Justin Tyler of comicbookclublive.com gave the run positive reviews, with Tyler likening the portrayal of 'B' to a "feature film version of the character", and comparing the story of the issue to The Mummy (1999). Zalben said he was at first "bummed" that original series co-writer Matt Kindt and original artist Ron Garney weren't involved, but said he ended up liking the comic regardless, praising the "surprising amount of important mythology" in the issue.
