= The Book of Elsewhere =

2024 novel by Keanu Reeves and China Miéville

- Cover from United States editions
- Author: Keanu Reeves; China Miéville
- Language: English
- Genre: Action; Speculative fiction
- Set in: BRZRKR universe
- Publisher: Boom! Studios; Del Rey Books
- Publication date: July 23, 2024
- Publication place: United States; United Kingdom
- Media type: Print (hardcover)

The Book of Elsewhere is a 2024 action and speculative fiction novel written by Keanu Reeves and British author China Miéville that takes place in an alternate universe to the main BRZRKR universe.

Reeves had initial ideas for a novel set in the BRZRKR universe after the release of the first volume of his BRZRKR comic book run (2021) was published. Reeves had been a fan of China Miéville's work, and wanted to initiate a collaboration despite doubting that he would succeed in convincing him to collaborate. However, work quickly began once basic terms were established by both parties. After a time of Miéville's insistence that the novel remain secret until he and Reeves were satisfied with the final product, it was officially announced in January 2024 on the Good Morning America show.

The Book of Elsewhere was published on July 23, 2024 by Boom! Studios and Del Rey Books.

== Premise ==
The Book of Elsewhere, set in an alternate world of the BRZRKR comic book universe, follows an immortal warrior on a millennia-long journey to understand his immortality.

== Conception and development ==
Keanu Reeves, better known for his roles in Hollywood films, published the first volume of his debut comic book series, BRZRKR in 2021. Not long after, Reeves initiated a collaboration with speculative fiction writer China Miéville, wanting to expand the franchise. He had enjoyed the author's previous work, and Boom! Studios had asked him who would be his "dream" author to write the book. Initially, Reeves was afraid that Miéville would decline, as he was "a big deal" in his circle. In deciding whether to collaborate, the author sought out Reeves's non-negotiable terms, as well as to establish his own; early collaboration ensued after Reeves had stipulated that his only terms were the basic outline of being set around B., the main character, and his journey to reconcile his immortality. Although Reeves admits he didn't write the book himself, wanting "another creator to take that journey", Miéville asserted "It wouldn't exist in the form without a lot of very thoughtful and careful work with [Reeves]."

During its inception, the novel was kept secret. Outside of his home, Miéville would only discuss the collaboration with his partner, Season Butler, as "the project with their very dear friend". On the collaborative process, Miéville remarked, "Sometimes the greatest games are those you play with other people's toys. It was an honour, a shock and a delight when Keanu invited me to play. But I could never have predicted how generous he'd be with toys he's spent so long creating." He found that writing in respect to an immortal character allowed himself to explore his long-held belief of immortality being "torture". In the context of his own views on writing, the author sought to respect the genres "set of principles", asserting that "If you come in wanting horrible violence and a helicopter chase, you’re going to get it, because it would be cheating to not give you that in a BRZRKR novel." He admitted that in the understanding of traditional literature, "tie-ins" are usually considered "vulgar", yet opined that some can be "really great". The author would insist on keeping Reeves from announcing the collaboration until a publication date was officially announced, and when he was finally confident that Reeves was happy with the finished product. It was formally announced in a January 2024 interview on Good Morning America.

== Reception and assessment ==
Writing for WIRED, Hannah Zeavin described the book as "less about Karl Marx than about Sigmund Freud." She considered the book "practically Freudian fan fiction", a stark contrast to her expectations, given Miéville's personal position as a staunch communist. She appreciated the ability to read the book as a "lost case study", finding the context of 'B' as a metaphor for Freud's death drive theory. Joshua Rivera of Polygon wrote highly of the book. He felt that it "has an elegance that might surprise you for a pulp thriller", and attributed that to Miéville's experienced writing prowess, who explored the "stranger aspects" of 'B'. He observed that the author's presentation of the story as if the world of BRZRKR didn't exist and the element of 'B's conflict with an immortal babirusa helped give it "an Annihilation-esque flair", and appreciated its increased focus on the philosophical aspects found in BRZRKR. He noted the book's appeal to not just to readers of BRZRKR, but also to Reeves's fans, and praised Reeves's ability to enable other creatives through his own work.

Jessa Crispin of The Daily Telegraph gave the book four stars. She praised Reeves's contributions to the story, feeling it helped "calm" Miéville's style of extreme detail, which in her opinion "[gave the] imagination space to move". She felt that the "Miéville-esque" language helped expand the universe of the book and offered a more thorough understanding of 'B's backstory. She felt less positively about the "self-consciously fantastical prose", feeling it would be more fit as narration in the upcoming film adaptation. Overall, she saw the book as a success in its mission of entertaining the reader, opining the longer format than a comic helped explore other aspects unique to the medium. The Los Angeles Times's Ilana Masad enjoyed the idea of one of her favorite celebrities writing a book with an author who she is a fan of. While she felt doubtful of the "jerky, staccato style" of the book's opener, she was impressed by the rest of the book's "lush prose and [Miéville] and Reeves' melancholy romp of a narrative". She felt the alternating chapters were a highlight, and that they along with 'B's, brought the book to "emotionally satisfying and morally complex places." She concluded that "Miéville's keen eye, brimful imagination and impeccable style make it a deeply pleasurable read."
