= Mattson Tomlin =

American screenwriter and producer (born 1990)

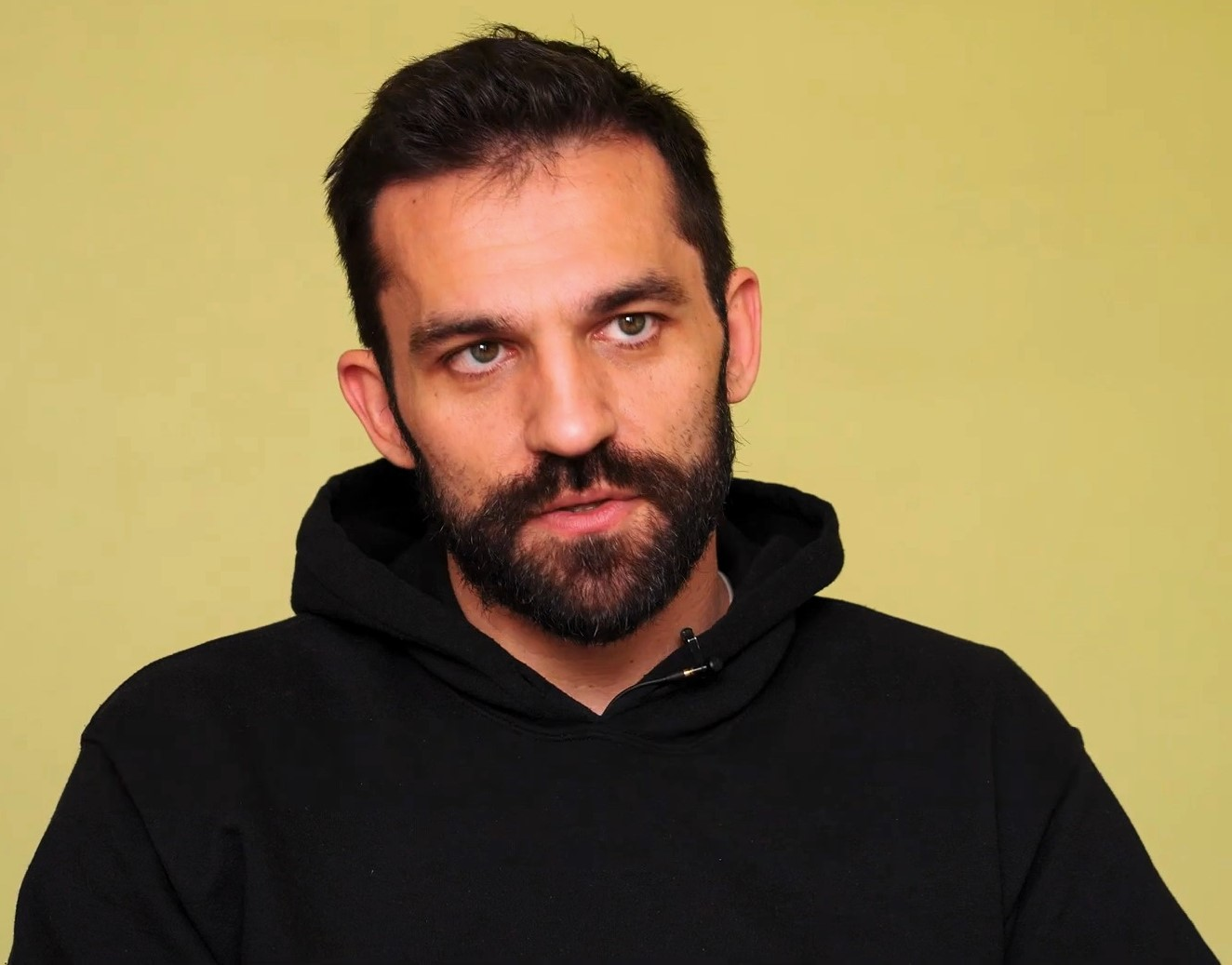
- Tomlin in 2024
- Born: July 16, 1990 (age 36); Romania
- Occupations: Screenwriter; Producer; Director
- Years active: 2018–present

Mattson Tomlin (born July 16, 1990) is an American filmmaker and writer.

== Early life ==
Tomlin was born on July 16, 1990, in Romania amid the Romanian revolution. He was adopted by an American couple and grew up in Massachusetts. From a young age he enjoyed films, and interned for John Hart on Revolutionary Road at age 17. He attended State University of New York at Purchase, graduating in 2012 with a Bachelor of Fine Arts degree in film. Afterwards, he enrolled in the American Film Institute's writer/director program, graduating in 2014.

== Career ==
In 2018, Tomlin wrote the script for the Project Power (2020) for Netflix, starring Jamie Foxx, Joseph Gordon-Levitt, and Dominique Fishback. He scripted and produced the film Little Fish (2020), based on a short story by Aja Gabel. He gained attention in 2019 when he was brought on board to assist with The Batman (2022). The film would serve as a reboot of the Batman film franchise and star Robert Pattinson. The script which was completed in 2019 was submitted to Warner Bros by Matt Reeves written by Reeves, Tomlin and Peter Craig although only Reeves and Craig received credit.

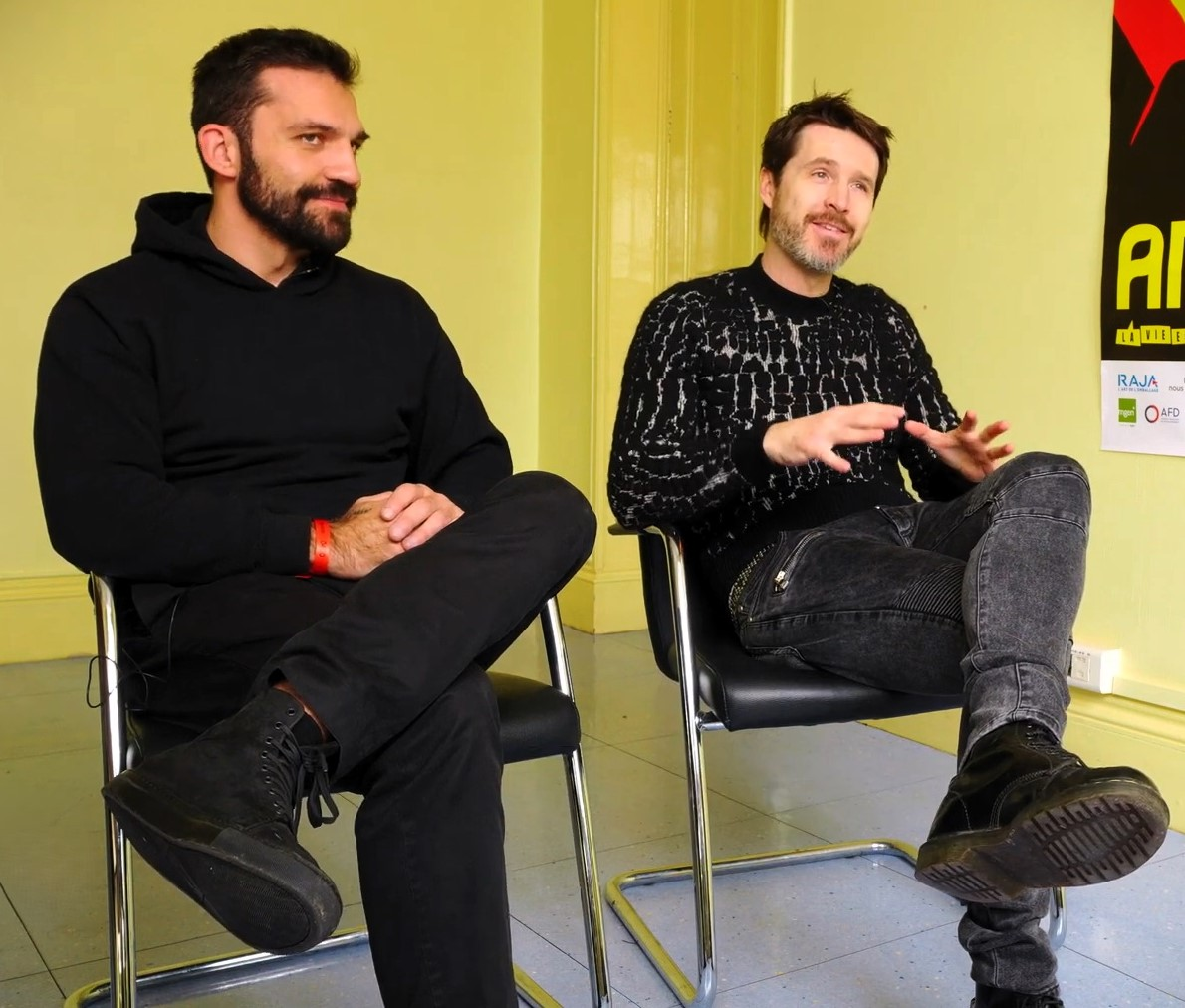
Tomlin with Lee Bermejo in 2024

By January 2020, Tomlin was writing the television pilot for an adaption of the comic book series Fear Agent, and a film adaption of the comic book series Memetic for Lionsgate. Both projects would be produced by Seth Rogen's Point Grey Pictures. He was also writing a film adaptation of the video game character Mega Man for Netflix. In May 2020, Tomlin sold a spec script, titled 2084, to Paramount Pictures. In September 2020, Tomlin wrote the script for Mother/Android, with the intention to direct.

In February 2021, Tomlin was hired to be the showrunner for an anime series based on the Terminator franchise, to be produced by Netflix, Skydance, and Production I.G, titled Terminator Zero. In 2021, Tomlin wrote the live-action film adaptation of BRZRKR and the comic book series Batman: The Imposter for DC Comics, alongside artist Andrea Sorrentino and with variant covers by artist Lee Bermejo. In 2022, Tomlin co-wrote the sequel to The Batman with Matt Reeves, the Oscar-nominated film The Sea Beast, and a three-issue maxiseries for Boom! Studios entitled A Vicious Circle, with Lee Bermejo serving as artist; the next year, the first issue of A Vicious Circle was nominated for multiple Eisner awards. In 2025, he scripted a John Wick spinoff movie, centered around Caine (played by Donnie Yen). Later that year, he announced that he was trying to contact director Sam Raimi with a pitch for Spider-Man 4, which was cancelled in 2010 after Raimi was unable to decide on a script. Tomlin's pitch would see Peter Parker / Spider-Man (played by Tobey Maguire) managing his duties as a husband to Mary Jane Watson (played by Kirsten Dunst) and a father along with that of being Spider-Man.

== Personal life ==
Tomlin lives in Los Angeles.

== Filmography ==
=== Film ===
Year	Title	Director	Writer	Producer	Notes
2020	Project Power	No	Yes	No	
2020	Little Fish	No	Yes	Yes	Based on the short story by Aja Gabel
2021	Mother/Android	Yes	Yes	Yes	Feature directorial debut
2022	The Batman	No	Uncredited	No	Script revisions
2022	The Sea Beast	No	Story Consultant	No	
2028	The Batman: Part II	No	Yes	No	Filming
TBA	Caine	No	Yes	No	Post-production

=== Television ===
Year	Title	Writer	Executive Producer	Developer	Notes
2024	Terminator Zero	Yes	Yes	Yes	Showrunner

== Bibliography ==
- Batman: The Imposter (2021)
- A Vicious Circle (2022–23)
- BRZRKR: Fallen Empire (2023)

== Accolades ==
In 2023, Tomlin's work on A Vicious Circle Book 1 was nominated at the Eisner Awards for "Best Single Issue/One-Shot".
