= Andrea Sorrentino =

Italian comic book artist (born 1982)

Andrea Sorrentino (born April 21, 1982) is an Italian comic book artist known for his work for DC Comics, Marvel and Image Comics. His work includes I, Vampire and Green Arrow for DC Comics, Uncanny X-Men, All-New X-Men and Old Man Logan for Marvel and Gideon Falls for Image Comics.

He his known for his unique style made of heavy inks and creative layouts.

In December 2012 he was awarded 'Best Comic artist of 2012' by IGN.

In July 2019 he won, together with writer Jeff Lemire, an Eisner Award for their creator-owned series Gideon Falls.

== Career ==
Sorrentino's first published work was for 'God of War' in 2010, written by Marv Wolfman (based on the Sony videogame for PlayStation), for Wildstorm. He then went to illustrate I, Vampire for DC Comics with writer Joshua Hale Fialkov. After a 15 issues run on the series, Sorrentino rose to popularity in the comics industry thanks to his work with writer Jeff Lemire on Green Arrow from 2013 to 2014.

In 2015, he signed an exclusive contract with Marvel and worked with writer Brian Michael Bendis on two X-Men annuals (for Uncanny X-Men and All-New X-Men), on two All-New X-Men issues, and then on the Old Man Logan limited series.

In 2016, he has rejoined writer Jeff Lemire to produce art for the ongoing Old Man Logan series. After 16 issues he announced he would leave the series for another important Marvel project, Secret Empire.

In 2017, he worked on Marvel's Secret Empire event, drawing 4 out of the 10 main issues, the Marvel Free Comic Book Day 2017 special and the Secret Empire: Omega issue.

In October 2017, he announced a new collaboration with writer Jeff Lemire for an Image Comics creator-owned horror ongoing series: Gideon Falls. The series started in March 2018 and in June 2018 it was announced to be adapted for TV by Hivemind, with Lemire and Sorrentino serving as Executive Producers on the project. In October 2019, Aquaman and Saw director James Wan, was also announced to join the TV adaptation as Executive Producer.

In July 2019, Gideon Falls has been rewarded with an Eisner Award as 'Best New Series of 2018'

In October 2019, while still working on Gideon Falls, Sorrentino has paired again with Jeff Lemire to produce a 3-issues limited series for DC Comics, Joker: Killer Smile. The series had a one-shot follow up in June 2020 called Batman: The Smile Killer.

In September 2021, he teamed up with Jeff Lemire to create Primordial, a 6 issue Sci Fi Cold War thriller miniseries for Image Comics. The series concluded in February 2022.

From October to December 2021, he worked on Batman: The Imposter for DC Comics with Mattison Tomlin. the series was a 3 issue limited series.

In 2024, Sorrentino was accused of using AI-generated images for comics such as Batman (contrary to DC Comics policy), which he denied doing.

In 2025, he has been announced as the artist of the limited comic series Blood Type, along with writer Corinna Bechko and colorist Dave Stewart as part of the Oni Press 'Summer of Fear' initiative.

== Awards ==
- 2012 'Best Comic Artist of 2012' for ign.com
- 2018 Eisner Award, with Jeff Lemire, for 'Best New Series' for Gideon Falls.

== Bibliography ==
=== WildStorm ===
- God of War #1–6 (with writer Marv Wolfman, 2010)

=== DC Comics ===
- I, Vampire #1–15, #0 (with writer Joshua Hale Fialkov, 2011–2012)
- Green Arrow #17–34, #23.1 (with writer Jeff Lemire, 2012–2014)
- Green Arrow: Future's End (with writer Jeff Lemire, 2014)
- Joker: Killer Smile #1–3 (with writer Jeff Lemire, 2019)
- Batman: The Smile Killer #1 (with writer Jeff Lemire, 2020)
- Green Arrow 80th Anniversary 100-Page Super Spectacular (with writer Jeff Lemire, 2021)
- Batman: The Imposter #1–3 (with writer Mattson Tomlin, 2021)

=== Marvel Comics ===
- Uncanny X-Men Annual #1 (with writer Brian Michael Bendis, 2014)
- All-New X-Men Annual #1 (with writer Brian Michael Bendis, 2014)
- All-New X-Men #38–39 (with writer Brian Michael Bendis, 2015)
- Old Man Logan Vol. 0 #1–5 (with writer Brian Michael Bendis, 2015)
- Old Man Logan Vol. 1 #1–13, #16–23 (with writer Jeff Lemire, 2016–2017)
- Secret Empire #2–3, #5, #7 (with writer Nick Spencer, 2017)
- Secret Empire: Omega #1 (with writer Nick Spencer, 2017)
- Star Wars #37 (with writers Jason Aaron and Dash Aaron, 2017)

=== Image Comics ===
- Gideon Falls #1–27 (with writer Jeff Lemire, 2018–2020)
- Primordial #1–6 (with writer Jeff Lemire, 2021–2022)
- The Bone Orchard Mythos (with writer Jeff Lemire, 2022–2024)
  - Prelude (Free Comic Book Day 2022)
  - The Passageway (2022)
