= Gideon Falls =

Horror comic book series

- Cover of Gideon Falls #1 (March 7, 2018), art by Andrea Sorrentino.

Publication information
- Publisher: Image Comics
- Schedule: Monthly
- Format: Ongoing
- Genre: Horror
- Publication date: March 2018 – December 2020
- No. of issues: 27

Creative team
- Created by: Jeff Lemire; Andrea Sorrentino
- Written by: Jeff Lemire
- Artist: Andrea Sorrentino
- Letterer: Steve Wands
- Colorist: Dave Stewart
- Editor: Will Dennis

Collected editions
- 1. The Black Barn: ISBN 9781534308527
- 2. Original Sins: ISBN 9781534310674
- 3. Stations of the Cross: ISBN 9781534313446
- 4. The Pentoculus: ISBN 9781534315136
- 5. Wicked Worlds: ISBN 9781534317222
- 6. The End: ISBN 9781534318670

Gideon Falls is an American horror comic book series created by writer Jeff Lemire and artist Andrea Sorrentino, published by Image Comics. The series ran for 27 issues from March 2018–December 2020.

== Plot ==
The lives of a reclusive young man obsessed with a conspiracy in the city's trash, and a washed-up Catholic priest arriving in a small town full of dark secrets, become intertwined around the mysterious legend of The Black Barn, an otherworldly building that is alleged to have appeared in both the city and the small town, throughout history, bringing death and madness in its wake.

== Publication history ==
Gideon Falls was first announced in October 2017, in advance of New York Comic Con. Lemire set out to create an intelligent horror story, not one driven by gore, but by exploring the nature of evil. Sorrentino described the central character, Norton Sinclair, as inheriting the worst from himself and Lemire - nihilism from Sorrentino and obsession from Lemire. Norton is based on a character Lemire created in 1996 for a short film during film school in Toronto. The Black Barn from the series was somewhat inspired by the Black Lodge from Twin Peaks, though Lemire assured readers that he was going somewhere very different with the concept. The story came from two separate stories that weren't working on their own, but finally clicked when Lemire put them together.

The series concluded at issue #27 in December 2020 with an 80-page issue.

=== Issues ===
Issue	Title	Release date	Trade Paperback Collection	Hardcover Collection
#1	The Speed of Pain	March 7, 2018	Gideon Falls – Volume 1: The Black Barn; October 17, 2018; 9781534308527	Gideon Falls; Book I: The Legend of the Black Barn; August 18, 2021; 9781534319189
#2	All the Little Sinners Say Hallelujah!	April 11, 2018	Gideon Falls – Volume 1: The Black Barn; October 17, 2018; 9781534308527	Gideon Falls; Book I: The Legend of the Black Barn; August 18, 2021; 9781534319189
#3	The Faller of Trees	May 16, 2018	Gideon Falls – Volume 1: The Black Barn; October 17, 2018; 9781534308527	Gideon Falls; Book I: The Legend of the Black Barn; August 18, 2021; 9781534319189
#4	Twin Shadows	June 20, 2018	Gideon Falls – Volume 1: The Black Barn; October 17, 2018; 9781534308527	Gideon Falls; Book I: The Legend of the Black Barn; August 18, 2021; 9781534319189
#5	We Are All Just Soft Instruments	July 18, 2018	Gideon Falls – Volume 1: The Black Barn; October 17, 2018; 9781534308527	Gideon Falls; Book I: The Legend of the Black Barn; August 18, 2021; 9781534319189
#6	The Faller of Trees	August 15, 2018	Gideon Falls – Volume 1: The Black Barn; October 17, 2018; 9781534308527	Gideon Falls; Book I: The Legend of the Black Barn; August 18, 2021; 9781534319189
#7	The Sum of Its Parts	October 17, 2018	Gideon Falls – Volume 2: Original Sins; April 17, 2019; 9781534310674	Gideon Falls; Book I: The Legend of the Black Barn; August 18, 2021; 9781534319189
#8	Killer Smile	November 14, 2018	Gideon Falls – Volume 2: Original Sins; April 17, 2019; 9781534310674	Gideon Falls; Book I: The Legend of the Black Barn; August 18, 2021; 9781534319189
#9	The Transfiguration	December 19, 2018	Gideon Falls – Volume 2: Original Sins; April 17, 2019; 9781534310674	Gideon Falls; Book I: The Legend of the Black Barn; August 18, 2021; 9781534319189
#10	The Hypostatic Union	January 16, 2019	Gideon Falls – Volume 2: Original Sins; April 17, 2019; 9781534310674	Gideon Falls; Book I: The Legend of the Black Barn; August 18, 2021; 9781534319189
#11	Did I Find You or Did You Find Me?	February 13, 2019	Gideon Falls – Volume 2: Original Sins; April 17, 2019; 9781534310674	Gideon Falls; Book I: The Legend of the Black Barn; August 18, 2021; 9781534319189
#12	The Laughing Man, Part One	April 17, 2019	Gideon Falls – Volume 3: Stations of the Cross; October 9, 2019; 9781534313446	Gideon Falls; Book I: The Legend of the Black Barn; August 18, 2021; 9781534319189
#13	He Said I Was Special	May 15, 2019	Gideon Falls – Volume 3: Stations of the Cross; October 9, 2019; 9781534313446	Gideon Falls; Book I: The Legend of the Black Barn; August 18, 2021; 9781534319189
#14	The Village Near the Centre	June 19, 2019	Gideon Falls – Volume 3: Stations of the Cross; October 9, 2019; 9781534313446	Gideon Falls; Book I: The Legend of the Black Barn; August 18, 2021; 9781534319189
#15	The Misplaced Man	July 17, 2019	Gideon Falls – Volume 3: Stations of the Cross; October 9, 2019; 9781534313446	Gideon Falls; Book I: The Legend of the Black Barn; August 18, 2021; 9781534319189
#16	All Those Little Scars	August 14, 2019	Gideon Falls – Volume 3: Stations of the Cross; October 9, 2019; 9781534313446	Gideon Falls; Book I: The Legend of the Black Barn; August 18, 2021; 9781534319189
#17	Forever and Ever	October 16, 2019	Gideon Falls – Volume 4: The Pentoculus; June 17, 2020 (with printing error); July 22, 2020 (corrected version); 9781534315136	Gideon Falls; Book II: The Eater of All Things; November 19, 2022; 9781534323292
#18	All of His Kingdoms	November 13, 2019	Gideon Falls – Volume 4: The Pentoculus; June 17, 2020 (with printing error); July 22, 2020 (corrected version); 9781534315136	Gideon Falls; Book II: The Eater of All Things; November 19, 2022; 9781534323292
#19	Alone in the Dark	December 11, 2019	Gideon Falls – Volume 4: The Pentoculus; June 17, 2020 (with printing error); July 22, 2020 (corrected version); 9781534315136	Gideon Falls; Book II: The Eater of All Things; November 19, 2022; 9781534323292
#20	Drink the Dark Water	January 8, 2020	Gideon Falls – Volume 4: The Pentoculus; June 17, 2020 (with printing error); July 22, 2020 (corrected version); 9781534315136	Gideon Falls; Book II: The Eater of All Things; November 19, 2022; 9781534323292
#21	The Eater of All Things	February 5, 2020	Gideon Falls – Volume 4: The Pentoculus; June 17, 2020 (with printing error); July 22, 2020 (corrected version); 9781534315136	Gideon Falls; Book II: The Eater of All Things; November 19, 2022; 9781534323292
#22	What's That Flying with the Crows?	June 17, 2020	Gideon Falls – Volume 5: Wicked Worlds; November 25, 2020; 9781534317222	Gideon Falls; Book II: The Eater of All Things; November 19, 2022; 9781534323292
#23	Neon Bible	July 15, 2020	Gideon Falls – Volume 5: Wicked Worlds; November 25, 2020; 9781534317222	Gideon Falls; Book II: The Eater of All Things; November 19, 2022; 9781534323292
#24	All the Best Cowgirls Have Daddy Issues	August 19, 2020	Gideon Falls – Volume 5: Wicked Worlds; November 25, 2020; 9781534317222	Gideon Falls; Book II: The Eater of All Things; November 19, 2022; 9781534323292
#25	Are You Feeling Sinister?	September 23, 2020	Gideon Falls – Volume 5: Wicked Worlds; November 25, 2020; 9781534317222	Gideon Falls; Book II: The Eater of All Things; November 19, 2022; 9781534323292
#26	It's Time to Play	October 21, 2020	Gideon Falls – Volume 5: Wicked Worlds; November 25, 2020; 9781534317222	Gideon Falls; Book II: The Eater of All Things; November 19, 2022; 9781534323292
#27	The End	December 23, 2020	Gideon Falls – Volume 6: The End; April 14, 2021; 9781534318670	Gideon Falls; Book II: The Eater of All Things; November 19, 2022; 9781534323292

== Awards ==
Year	Award	Category	Nominee	Result
2019	Eisner Awards	Best New Series	Gideon Falls; Jeff Lemire and Andrea Sorrentino	Won
2019	Eisner Awards	Best Writer	Jeff Lemire	Nominated
2020	Eisner Awards	Best Coloring	Dave Stewart	Won

== Television adaptation ==
Gideon Falls was picked up for a television series by Hivemind Productions in June 2018. Lemire and Sorrentino will serve as executive producers alongside Jason Brown, Sean Daniel, Kathy Lingg, and Dinesh Shamdasani. In October 2019, James Wan, along with his Atomic Monster partner Michael Clear, has joined as executive producer. Lemire has assured readers that despite television development, the comic will remain his primary focus.
