= Keanu Reeves filmography =

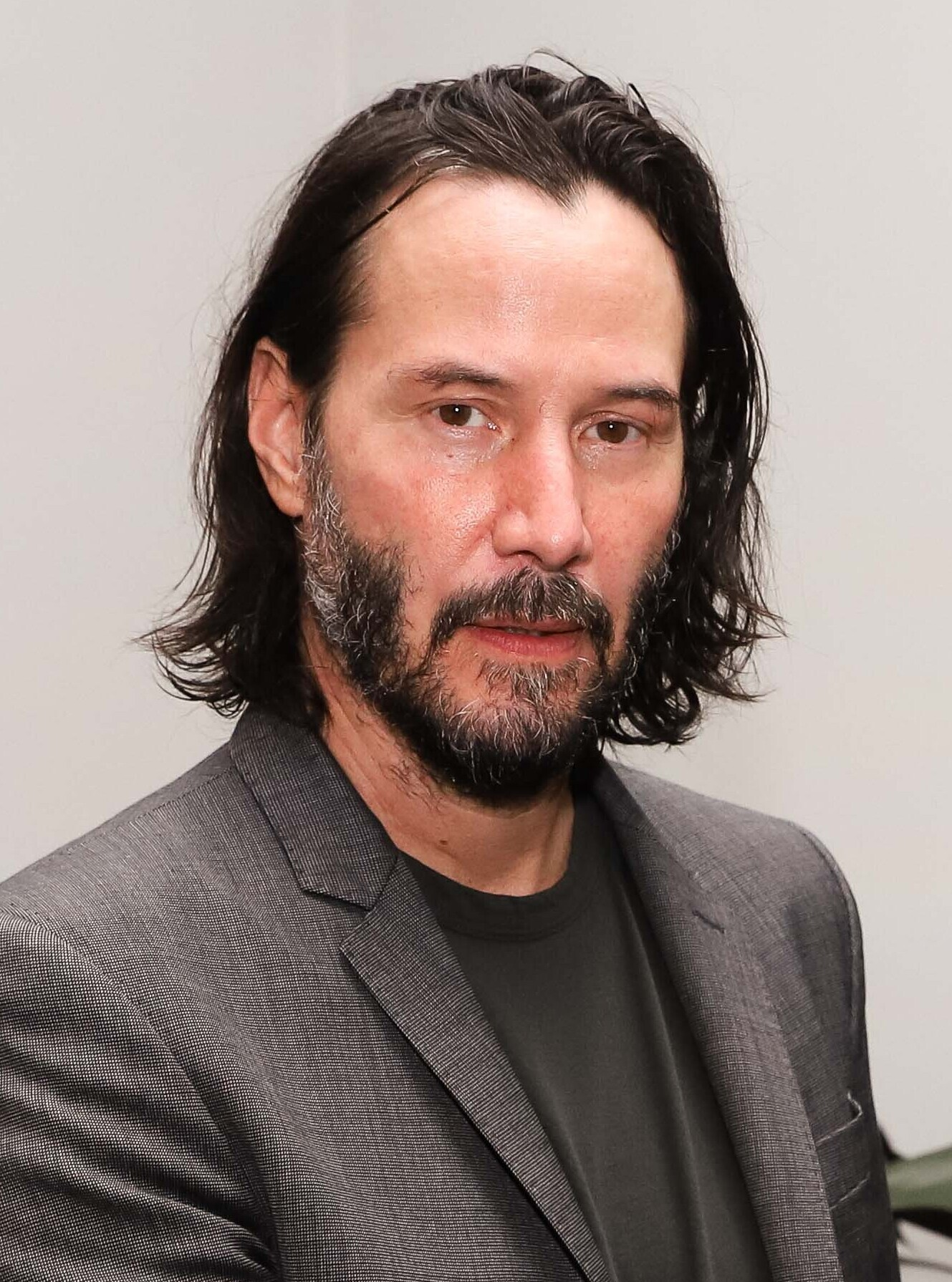
Reeves in 2019

Keanu Reeves is a Canadian actor who has appeared in films, television series and video games. He made his film debut in the short One Step Away in 1985. The following year, Reeves appeared in the crime film River's Edge, and the television films Babes in Toyland, Act of Vengeance, and Brotherhood of Justice. His first lead role was as a teenager dealing with his best friend's suicide in the 1988 drama Permanent Record. His breakthrough role came when he played time-travelling slacker Ted "Theodore" Logan in the science fiction comedy Bill & Ted's Excellent Adventure (1989) with Alex Winter, which was an unexpected commercial success. Reeves followed this with a supporting role in Ron Howard's comedy Parenthood. In 1991 he starred in the action film Point Break with Patrick Swayze, the science fiction comedy sequel Bill & Ted's Bogus Journey, and the independent drama My Own Private Idaho.

He starred as a police officer in the action thriller Speed (1994) with Sandra Bullock, which was a commercial and critical success. However he followed this with a series of films that performed poorly at the box office, including Johnny Mnemonic (1995) and Chain Reaction (1996). His career experienced a turnaround when he played computer hacker Neo in the science fiction film The Matrix (1999). The film was a commercial success and received critical acclaim. He reprised the role in its sequels, The Matrix Reloaded, The Matrix Revolutions (both 2003), and The Matrix Resurrections (2021). Reeves played exorcist John Constantine in Constantine and a dentist in the comedy-drama Thumbsucker (both 2005). He reunited with Bullock in the 2006 romantic drama The Lake House. In 2008, Reeves played alien Klaatu in The Day the Earth Stood Still.

Reeves played the assassin in the neo-noir action thriller John Wick (2014), which was a commercial success and had a generally positive reception from critics. He starred in its sequels, John Wick: Chapter 2 (2017), John Wick: Chapter 3 – Parabellum (2019) and John Wick: Chapter 4 (2023). In 2016, he played the ghost of a stuntman in the American-Swedish television series Swedish Dicks. Reeves voiced Duke Caboom in the animated film sequel Toy Story 4 (2019), which grossed over $1 billion at the worldwide box office, and in 2020 portrayed rock star Johnny Silverhand in the video game Cyberpunk 2077. Reeves reprised his role as Silverhand alongside Idris Elba in Cyberpunk's Phantom Liberty expansion (2023), and starred alongside Elba in Sonic the Hedgehog 3 (2024) as Shadow the Hedgehog.

== Film ==
Year	Title	Role(s)	Notes	Ref(s)
1985	One Step Away	Ron Petrie	Short film	
1986	Youngblood	Heaver		
1986	Flying	Tommy		
1986	River's Edge	Matt		
1988	The Night Before	Winston Connelly		
1988	Permanent Record	Chris Townsend		
1988	The Prince of Pennsylvania	Rupert Marshetta		
1988	Dangerous Liaisons	Le Chevalier Raphael Danceny		
1989	Bill & Ted's Excellent Adventure	Ted "Theodore" Logan		
1989	Parenthood	Tod		
1990	I Love You to Death	Marlon		
1990	Tune in Tomorrow	Martin Loader		
1991	Point Break	Johnny Utah		
1991	Bill & Ted's Bogus Journey	Ted "Theodore" Logan / Evil Robot Ted		
1991	My Own Private Idaho	Scott Favor		
1992	Bram Stoker's Dracula	Jonathan Harker		
1993	Much Ado About Nothing	Don John		
1993	Even Cowgirls Get the Blues	Julian Gitche		
1993	Freaked	Ortiz the Dog Boy	Uncredited cameo	
1993	Little Buddha	Prince Siddhartha		
1994	Speed	LAPD Officer Jack Traven		
1995	Johnny Mnemonic	Johnny Mnemonic		
1995	A Walk in the Clouds	Paul Sutton		
1996	Chain Reaction	Eddie Kasalivich		
1996	Feeling Minnesota	Jjaks Clayton		
1997	The Last Time I Committed Suicide	Harry		
1997	The Devil's Advocate	Kevin Lomax		
1999	The Matrix	Neo		
1999	Me and Will	Himself	Uncredited cameo	
2000	The Replacements	Shane Falco		
2000	The Watcher	David Allen Griffin		
2000	The Gift	Donnie Barksdale		
2001	Sweet November	Nelson Moss		
2001	Hardball	Conor O'Neill		
2003	The Matrix Reloaded	Neo		
2003	The Animatrix	Neo	Voice; segment "Kid's Story"	
2003	The Matrix Revolutions	Neo		
2003	Something's Gotta Give	Dr. Julian Mercer		
2005	Constantine	John Constantine		
2005	Thumbsucker	Dr. Perry Lyman		
2005	Ellie Parker	Himself	Cameo	
2006	A Scanner Darkly	Bob Arctor		
2006	The Lake House	Alex Wyler		
2006	The Great Warming	Narrator	Voice; documentary	
2008	Street Kings	Detective Tom Ludlow		
2008	The Day the Earth Stood Still	Klaatu		
2009	The Private Lives of Pippa Lee	Chris Nadeau		
2010	Henry's Crime	Henry Torne		
2012	Side by Side	Himself	Also producer; documentary	
2012	Sunset Strip	Himself	Documentary	
2012	Generation Um...	John Wall		
2013	Man of Tai Chi	Donaka Mark	Also director	
2013	47 Ronin	Kai		
2014	John Wick	John Wick		
2015	Knock Knock	Evan Webber	Also executive producer	
2015	Deep Web: The Untold Story of Bitcoin and the Silk Road	Narrator	Voice; documentary	
2015	Mifune: The Last Samurai	Narrator	Voice; documentary	
2016	Exposed	Detective Scott Galban	Also producer	
2016	Keanu	Keanu	Voice; cameo	
2016	The Neon Demon	Hank		
2016	The Bad Batch	The Dream		
2016	The Whole Truth	Richard Ramsay		
2017	To the Bone	Dr. William Beckham		
2017	John Wick: Chapter 2	John Wick		
2017	A Happening of Monumental Proportions	Bob	Cameo	
2017	SPF-18	Himself	Cameo	
2018	Siberia	Lucas Hill	Also producer	
2018	Destination Wedding	Frank		
2018	Replicas	Will Foster	Also producer	
2019	John Wick: Chapter 3 – Parabellum	John Wick		
2019	Always Be My Maybe	Himself		
2019	Toy Story 4	Duke Caboom	Voice	
2019	Already Gone	—N/a	Executive producer	
2019	Between Two Ferns: The Movie	Himself	Cameo	
2020	The SpongeBob Movie: Sponge on the Run	Sage		
2020	Bill & Ted Face the Music	Ted "Theodore" Logan		
2021	The Matrix Resurrections	Neo / Thomas Anderson		
2022	DC League of Super-Pets	Bruce Wayne / Batman	Voice	
2023	John Wick: Chapter 4	John Wick	Also executive producer	
2024	A Very Sonic Christmas	Shadow the Hedgehog	Voice, short film	
2024	Sonic the Hedgehog 3	Shadow the Hedgehog	Voice	
2025	Wick Is Pain	Himself	Also executive producer; documentary	
2025	Ballerina	John Wick	Also executive producer	
2025	Good Fortune	Gabriel		
2025	Last Days	—N/a	Executive producer	
2026	Outcome	Reef Hawk		
2026	Toy Story 5	Duke Caboom	Voice cameo	
2027	Shiver †	TBA	Post-production	
2027	Sonic the Hedgehog 4 †	Shadow the Hedgehog	Voice; post-production	
TBA	The Entertainment System Is Down †	Graves Keeper	Post-production	

Key
†	Denotes films that have not yet been released

== Television ==
Year(s)	Title	Role(s)	Notes	Ref(s)
1984	Hangin' In	Teen Client		
1985	Letting Go	Stereo Teen	Television film	
1985	Night Heat	Mugger / Thug #1	2 episodes	
1985	Fast Food	Crackers		
1986	The Disney Sunday Movie	Michael Riley (age 17)	Episode: "Young Again"	
1986	Babes in Toyland	Jack Nimble	Television film	
1986	Act of Vengeance	Buddy Martin	Television film	
1986	Brotherhood of Justice	Derek	Television film	
1986	Under the Influence	Eddie Talbot	Television film	
1987	Trying Times	Joey	Episode: "Moving Day"	
1989	Life Under Water	Kip	Television film	
1989	The Tracey Ullman Show	Jesse Walker	Segment: "Two Lost Souls"	
1990	Bill & Ted's Excellent Adventures	Ted "Theodore" Logan	Voice; 13 episodes	
2009	Bollywood Hero	Himself	Cameo; miniseries	
2016–2018	Swedish Dicks	Tex	13 episodes	
2020	A World of Calm	Narrator	Voice; episode: "Living Among Trees"	
2023	Ride with Norman Reedus	Himself	Episode: "The Utah Desert with Keanu Reeves"	
2023	Brawn: The Impossible Formula 1 Story	Host	Documentary series; also executive producer	
2024	Ancient Apocalypse	Himself	Season 2; recurring guest	
2024	Secret Level	Pilot (voice and motion-capture)	Episode: "Armored Core: Asset Management"	
2025	Severance	Animated Lumon Administrative Building	Voice; episode: "Hello, Ms. Cobel"; uncredited	

== Stage ==
Year	Title	Role	Venue	Notes	Ref.
1995	Hamlet	Prince Hamlet	Manitoba Theatre Centre		
2025	Waiting for Godot	Estragon	Hudson Theatre		

== Video games ==
Year	Title	Role(s)	Notes	Ref(s)
2003	Enter the Matrix	Neo	Live action FMV cutscenes and voice-over role	
2005	Constantine	John Constantine	Likeness only, tie-in for Constantine	
2014	Payday 2	John Wick	Likeness only, John Wick Heists DLC pack	
2019	Fortnite	John Wick, Johnny Silverhand	Likeness only, DLC cosmetic	
2020	Cyberpunk 2077	Johnny Silverhand	Voice and motion capture, as well as Phantom Liberty expansion	
2021	The Matrix Awakens	Himself and Neo	Voice, tie-in The Matrix Awakens tech demo for The Matrix Resurrections	
2024	Shadow Generations	Shadow the Hedgehog	Voice; "Sonic the Hedgehog 3 Movie Pack" DLC	
TBA	Untitled John Wick Game	John Wick	Voice & Likeness	

== Music videos ==
Year	Artist	Title	Role	Notes	Ref.
1991	Paula Abdul	"Rush Rush"	Jim		

== See also ==
- List of awards and nominations received by Keanu Reeves
