= Keanumycin =

Group of chemical compounds

Keanumycins are a group of chemical compounds isolated from bacteria in the genus Pseudomonas. They are classified as nonribosomal lipopeptides and they have a variety of antimicrobial activities. Keanumycin A is active against the amoebas Dictyostelium discoideum (IC_{50} = 4.4 nM), Acanthamoeba castellanii (IC_{50} = 2.0 μM), and Acanthamoeba comandoni (IC_{50} = 3.1 μM) which cause infections in humans.

Fermentation broth containing keanumycins is effective against the fungus Botrytis cinerea and can be directly applied to plants to stop the development of Botrytis blight.

Researchers at the Hans Knöll Institute who first isolated and characterized these compounds named them after the actor Keanu Reeves because their deadliness was perceived to be comparable to Reeves in his film roles.

== Chemical structures ==
Chemical structures of keanumycins

Keanumycin A

Keanumycin B

Keanumycin C
