= Man of Tai Chi =

2013 Chinese-American martial arts film by Keanu Reeves

- Chinese theatrical release poster
- Directed by: Keanu Reeves
- Written by: Michael G. Cooney
- Produced by: Lemore Syvan
- Starring: Tiger Chen; Keanu Reeves; Karen Mok; Yu Hai; Ye Qing; Simon Yam
- Cinematography: Elliot Davis
- Edited by: Derek Hui
- Music by: Chan Kwong-wing
- Production companies: Universal Pictures; Village Roadshow Pictures Asia; China Film Co., Ltd; Wanda Media
- Distributed by: China Film Co., Ltd Wanda Media (China); RADiUS-TWC (United States); Universal Pictures (International)
- Release dates: 5 July 2013 (China); 1 November 2013 (United States)
- Running time: 105 minutes
- Countries: China; United States
- Languages: Mandarin; English; Cantonese
- Budget: US$25 million
- Box office: US$5.5 million

Man of Tai Chi is a 2013 martial arts film directed by Keanu Reeves in his directorial debut. It also stars Reeves, Tiger Chen (credited as Chen Hu), Karen Mok and Simon Yam. The film is multilingual, featuring dialogue in Mandarin, English and Cantonese. In the film, a young martial artist enters the world of underground fighting to earn money for the refurbishing of his temple.

The film was released in China on 5 July 2013, and in the United States on 1 November 2013. It received generally positive reviews, with critics praising Reeves's direction and action sequences, but bombed at the box office.

== Plot ==
Hong Kong police officer Sun-Jing is investigating Donaka Mark, who is hosting an illegal fighting operation. Donaka attempts to recruit Tiger, a young working-class disciple of Tai Chi, at a Wu Lin Wang Competition. Donaka offers large sums of money to fight for him but Tiger refuses, as fighting for money would compromise his honor.

Soon after, land inspectors declare Tiger's Tai Chi temple structurally unsafe, intending to demolish the temple. To preserve the temple, Tiger applies for historic protection status, arguing it is a place for cultivating peace and wellbeing; however, he requires a large sum of money to repair the temple and accepts Donaka's offer.

Donaka's illegal fights take the form of modern gladiatorial combat, for the entertainment of wealthy individuals. Tiger earns enough money to repair the temple and improve his quality of life, but develops a more brutal style. In the Wu Lin Competition, Tiger viciously injures his opponent; the authorities reject his temple petition for historical protection, as his actions at the competition clearly do not represent peace and wellbeing. Tiger nearly kills his next opponent, but relents at the end. Realizing how much he has changed for the worse, Tiger declares his intention to stop fighting for Donaka and contacts officer Sun-Jing. They plan to track the location of the next fight and arrest Donaka; Sun-Jing is hindered by her boss, Superintendent Wong, who secretly works for Donaka.

Donaka prepares a fight to the death for Tiger. Donaka reveals how he engineered the temple's crisis to manipulate Tiger; he wished to transform him from innocent martial arts practitioner to ruthless killer. In the ring, Tiger refuses to fight his assigned opponent, continuously evading him. Sun-Jing's officers storm the compound, but Donaka escapes. Later, Donaka arrives at the temple and begins a fight with Tiger. Donaka initially has the upper hand, but Tiger re-embraces his Tai Chi training and manages to palm-strike Donaka despite getting stabbed. A dying Donaka expresses his pleasure for having pushed Tiger to become a killer.

In the aftermath, Sun-Jing is promoted to Superintendent and Tiger's temple petition succeeds. Tiger intends to open his own Tai Chi school in the city to continue the legacy of the Ling Kong Tai Chi.

== Cast ==
- Chen Hu as Tiger Chen Lin Hu
- Keanu Reeves as Donaka Mark
- Karen Mok as Inspector Suen Jing Si
- Yu Hai as Master Yang
- Ye Qing as Ching Sha
- Simon Yam as Superintendent Wong

== Production ==
Pre-production began in 2007-2008 with years-long script refinements. When the project eventually moved into the production phase, principal photography occurred on mainland China and Hong Kong.

== Release ==
The film received an R rating from the MPAA, although Reeves said it was shot with the intention of a PG-13 rating.

The film premiered in 2013 with showings at the Beijing Film Festival and Cannes Film Festival. It was also scheduled to be shown at the 2013 Toronto International Film Festival. It became available for purchase on 27 September 2013, via the iTunes Store (VOD) video on demand, and had its theatrical release in the US on 1 November 2013.

== Reception ==
The film premiered at the 2013 Beijing International Film Festival, where it received praise from action film director John Woo. Rotten Tomatoes reported that 71% of critics gave the film a positive review based on 68 reviews, with an average rating of 6.10/10. The site's consensus reads, "It may not be groundbreaking, but Man of Tai Chi represents an agreeably old-fashioned picture for martial arts fans – and a solid debut for first-time director Keanu Reeves." On Metacritic, the film has a weighted average score of 52 out of 100 based on 22 critic reviews, indicating "mixed or average reviews". Since its release, Man of Tai Chi has been regarded as one of the best films in Reeves's filmography.

Robert Abele of the Los Angeles Times called it "a movie streamlined to evoke the timeless zip of martial arts movies past" and praised the "refreshingly grounded and old-school kinetic" action. Sheila O'Malley, writing at RogerEbert.com, also praised the "thrilling immediacy" of the fight scenes: "you realize you are actually seeing these guys actually do this, as opposed to watching something pieced together later in the editing room". Dave McGinn of the Globe and Mail, in contrast, called the film "ambitious but generic" and filled with "stale conventions".

Despite the favorable reviews, the movie was a box office bomb, having grossed US$5.5 million against a budget of US$25 million.

== See also ==
- List of martial arts films
