= ARCH Motorcycle =

American motorcycle manufacturer

- Founded: 2011; 15 years ago
- Founder: Keanu Reeves; Gard Hollinger
- Headquarters: Hawthorne, California, U.S.
- Key people: Keanu Reeves; Gard Hollinger
- Products: Motorcycles
- Website: www.archmotorcycle.com

ARCH Motorcycle Company, LLC is an American custom production motorcycle manufacturer founded by Keanu Reeves and Gard Hollinger in 2011.

== History ==
In 2007, Keanu Reeves employed Gard Hollinger to customize his Harley-Davidson Dyna Wide Glide, but after five years of design and testing, Reeves's bike only retained the Harley-Davidson engine. Reeves liked the finished product's handling and character so much that he suggested he and Hollinger start a motorcycle company to mass-produce the bike. Initially, Hollinger refused as he already owned his own motorcycle customization business and was not looking to take the significant step of producing an entire motorcycle and its constituent parts from scratch. According to the pair, Hollinger was eventually convinced by Reeves's persistence, enthusiasm and argument that they could produce something great to leave behind as a legacy.

The custom Harley-Davidson served as the prototype ARCH motorcycle which eventually evolved into the company's first production model; the KRGT-1. The KRGT-1 launched in September 2014 and was designed and built using the lessons learned from the initial customization of Reeves's Harley-Davidson and Hollinger's extensive experience in commercial motorcycle customization. According to Reeves—the Porsche 911 served as an inspiration for the KRGT-1 as the 911 is "a vehicle suited for daily use as well as for outright speed" and is "as user-friendly as possible" and "always look beautiful and perform just as brilliantly" all of which was a requirement for the KRGT-1.

== Models ==
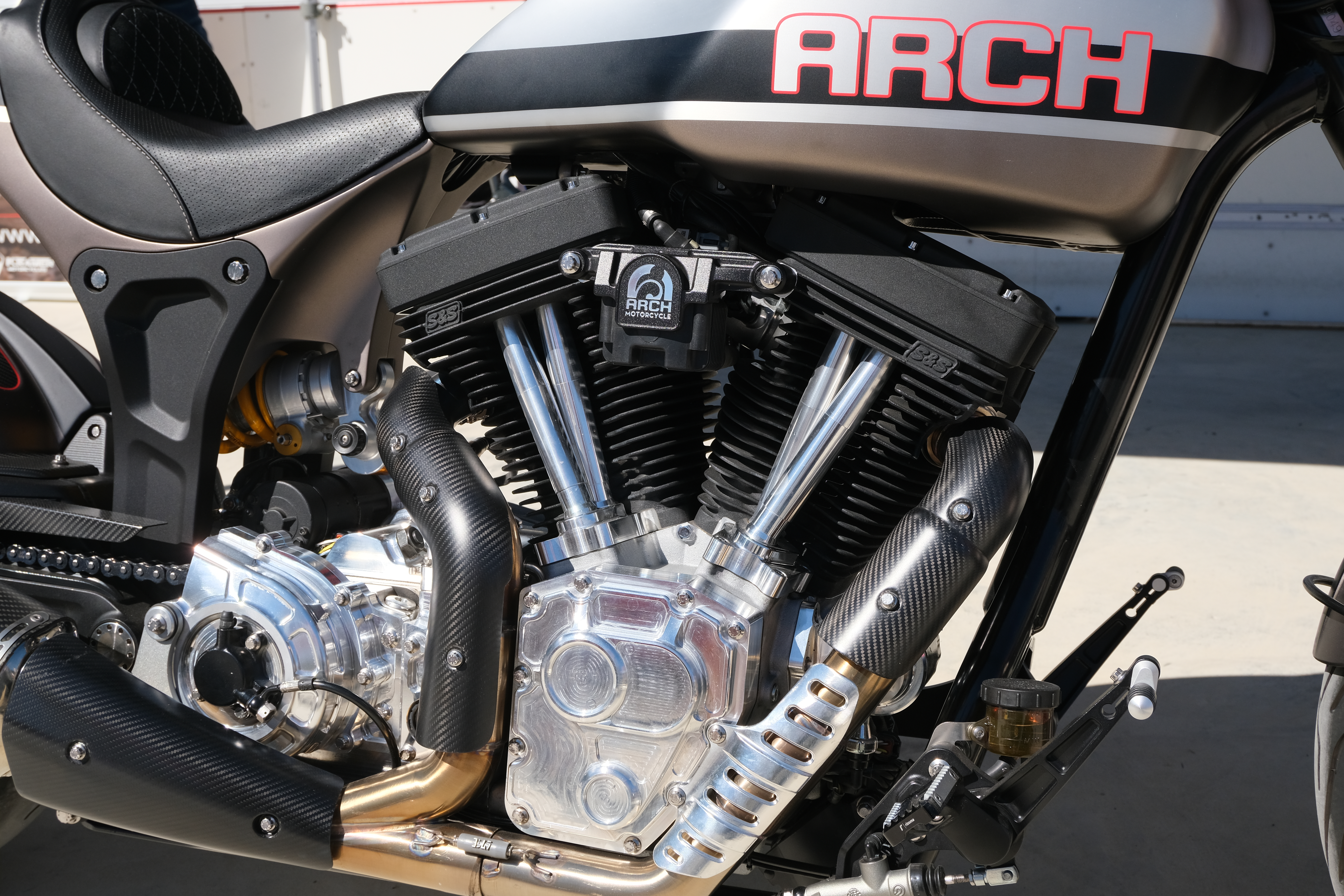
KRGT-1 engine

As of April 2023, ARCH is producing two models; the KRGT-1 and 1s. ARCH also revealed the Method143 in November 2017 at EICMA, but that has yet to enter production. Each model is customized to every customers individual specifications and measurements.

ARCH motorcycles are described as "American performance cruisers"—according to Reeves and Hollinger; a bike created in the typical American motorcycle style with the comfort and range of a cruiser but closer in performance and handling to a sports bike.

The 1s and Method143 take on a sportier and more aggressive riding position and design than the KRGT-1. The Method143 is described as a "concept", as such it has an unusual, striking and futuristic appearance, much like concept automobiles.

== In popular culture ==
- The brand appears in the 2020 video game Cyberpunk 2077, in which Reeves portrays a main character, with Jackie Welles owning a custom bike manufactured by Arch.
