= Keanu Reeves =

Canadian actor (born 1964)

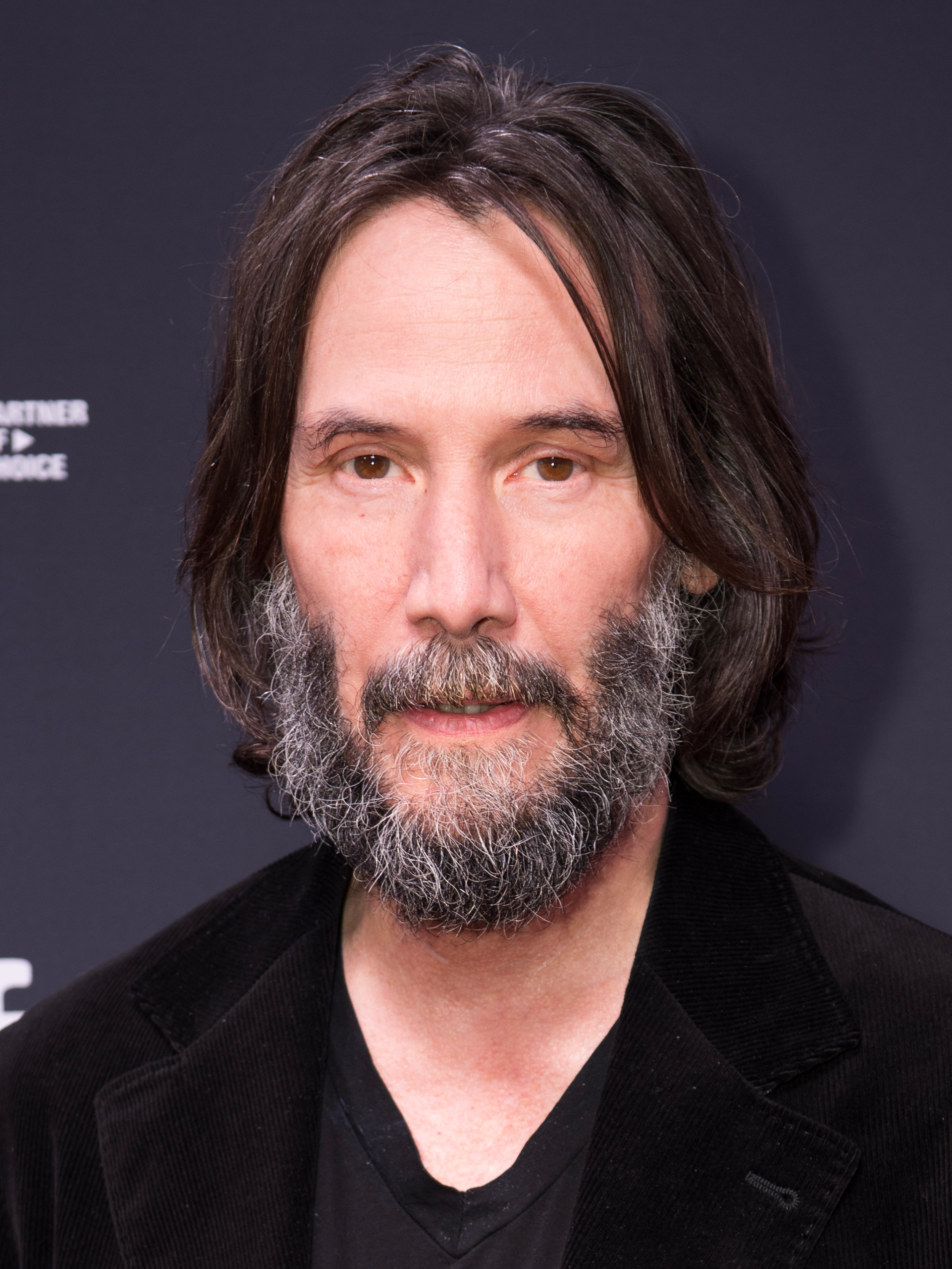
- Reeves in 2025
- Born: Keanu Charles Reeves; September 2, 1964 (age 62); Beirut, Lebanon
- Citizenship: Canada
- Occupations: Actor; musician
- Years active: 1984–present
- Works: Filmography
- Partners: Jennifer Syme (1998–2000, 2001; her death); Alexandra Grant (c. 2018–present) (Note: Although Reeves and Grant have had a business relationship publishing books that began shortly after they met in 2009, they only went public with their personal relationship in November 2019. Meg Tilly, Grant's friend, stated in July 2020 that "I remember a couple of years ago, about a year and a half ago, [Grant] said, 'Keanu Reeves is my boyfriend,'" and "[Grant] had gone to a lot of events with him [in the past]. It's just suddenly surfaced that he's been dating her for several years." Therefore the earliest that one could reasonably surmise that the personal relationship began is 2018.)
- Children: 1 (Note: Stillborn)
- Relatives: Paul Aaron (step-father)
- Awards: Full list
- Musical career
- Genre: Rock
- Instruments: Bass guitar
- Years active: 1991–present
- Member of: Dogstar

Signature
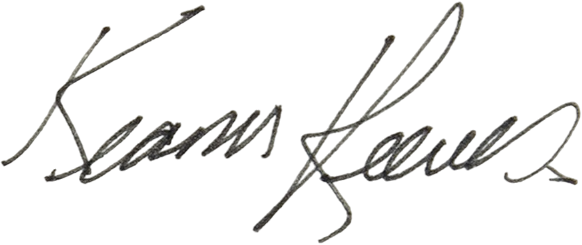

Keanu Charles Reeves (/kiˈɑːnuː/ kee-AH-noo; born September 2, 1964) is a Canadian (Note: Although he was born in Lebanon to an English mother and an American father, Reeves was raised in Canada. He identifies as Canadian and holds only Canadian citizenship. At the time of his birth, British women could not automatically transmit citizenship at birth to their children born abroad. Due to legislative changes introduced in 2003, Reeves is eligible for British citizenship upon demand.) actor and musician. The recipient of numerous accolades in a career on screen spanning four decades, he is known for his leading roles in action films, his amiable public image, and his philanthropic efforts. In 2020, The New York Times ranked him as the fourth-greatest actor of the 21st century, and in 2022, Time magazine named him one of the 100 most influential people in the world.

Born in Beirut and raised in Toronto, Reeves made his acting debut in the Canadian television series Hangin' In (1984), before making his feature-film debut in Youngblood (1986). He had his breakthrough role in the science-fiction comedies Bill & Ted's Excellent Adventure (1989) and Bill & Ted's Bogus Journey (1991). He gained praise for playing a hustler in the independent drama My Own Private Idaho (1991) and established himself as an action hero with leading roles in Point Break (1991) and Speed (1994). Following several box-office disappointments, Reeves's performance in the horror film The Devil's Advocate (1997) was well received. Greater stardom came with his role as Neo in The Matrix (1999); Until 2016, Reeves was the highest paid actor for a single production for reprising the role in its 2003 sequels Reloaded and Revolutions. He also played John Constantine in Constantine (2005).

Reeves made his film directorial debut with Man of Tai Chi (2013). Following a period of limited commercial success, he made a career comeback by playing the titular assassin in the action film series John Wick (2014–present). Reeves voiced Duke Caboom in Toy Story 4 (2019) and portrayed Johnny Silverhand in the video game Cyberpunk 2077 (2020) as well as its expansion. He has since reprised his roles of Ted in Bill & Ted Face the Music (2020) and Neo in The Matrix: Resurrections (2021), and voiced Shadow the Hedgehog in Sonic the Hedgehog 3 (2024).

In addition to acting, Reeves is a member of the musical band Dogstar, releasing albums including Somewhere Between the Power Lines and Palm Trees (2023). He is the co-writer and creator of the BRZRKR franchise, which started with the original comic book (2021–2023) and since expanded to include numerous spin-offs, including The Book of Elsewhere (2024). An avid motorcyclist, Reeves is the co-founder of the custom manufacturer ARCH Motorcycle. He also co-founded the production company Company Films.

== Early life ==
Keanu Charles Reeves was born in Beirut, Lebanon, on September 2, 1964, the son of Patricia (née Taylor), a costume designer and performer, and Samuel Nowlin Reeves Jr. His mother is English, originating from Essex. His American father is from Hawaii, and is of Native Hawaiian, Chinese, English, and Portuguese descent. Reeves's paternal grandmother is of Hawaiian and Chinese descent. His mother was working in Beirut when she met his father. They divorced in 1966 when Reeves was a toddler. Reeves last met his father on the Hawaiian island of Kaua'i when he was thirteen.

After his parents divorced in 1966, his mother moved the family to Sydney, Australia, and then to New York City, where she married Paul Aaron, a Broadway and Hollywood director, in 1970. The couple moved to Toronto and divorced in 1971. When Reeves was nine, he took part in a theatre production of Damn Yankees. Aaron remained close to Reeves, offering him advice and recommending him a job at the Hedgerow Theatre in Pennsylvania. Reeves's mother married Robert Miller, a rock music promoter, in 1976; the couple divorced in 1980. Reeves and his sisters grew up primarily in the Yorkville neighborhood of Toronto, where they were cared for, in large part, by a nanny. Reeves watched British comedy shows such as The Two Ronnies, and his mother imparted English manners that he has maintained into adulthood. Because of his grandmother's Chinese ethnicity, Reeves grew up with Chinese art, furniture, and cuisine.

External videos
- " Keanu Reeves'" – Canada's Walk of Fame inductee speech. - etalk [youtube] (7:11 min)

Describing himself as a "private kid", Reeves attended four different high schools, including the Etobicoke School of the Arts, from which he was expelled. Reeves said he was expelled because he was "just a little too rambunctious and shot my mouth off once too often ... I was not generally the most well-oiled machine in the school". Reeves has dyslexia and has said, "Because I had trouble reading, I wasn't a good student". At De La Salle College, he was a successful ice hockey goalkeeper. Reeves had aspirations to play for the Canadian Olympic team and was once considered an OHL prospect, but his hockey career ended due to injury. (Note: Although Reeves would later claim he never seriously considered hockey as a career, according to his former teammate and writer for the Hockey News, Jason Kay) At the age of fifteen, he decided he wanted to become an actor. After leaving De La Salle College, he attended Avondale Secondary Alternative School, which allowed him to get an education while working as an actor. Reeves dropped out of high school when he was seventeen. He obtained a green card through his American stepfather and moved to Los Angeles three years later. Reeves holds only Canadian citizenship.

== Career ==
=== 1984–1990: Early work ===
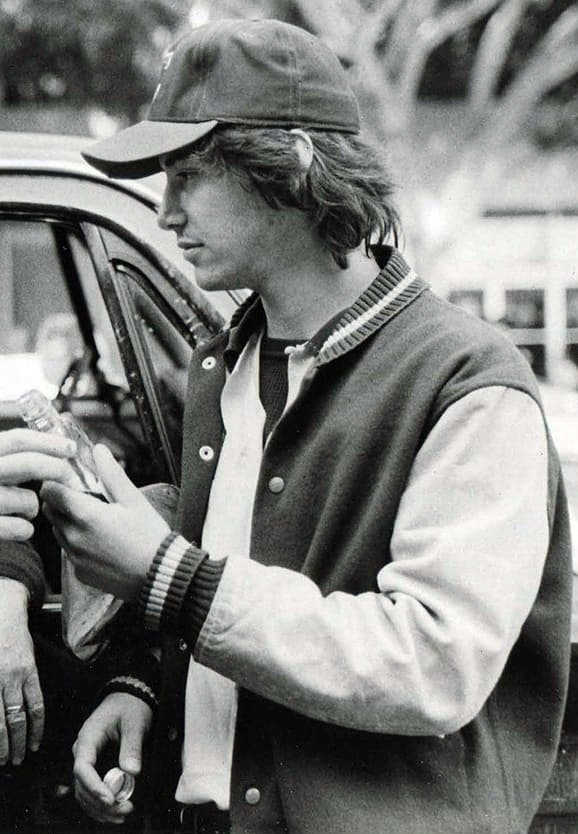
Reeves in 1986

In 1984, Reeves was a correspondent for the Canadian Broadcasting Corporation (CBC) youth television program Going Great. That same year, he made his acting debut in an episode of the television series, called Hangin' In. In 1985, he played Mercutio in a stage production of Romeo and Juliet at the Leah Posluns Theatre in North York, Ontario. He made further appearances on stage, including Brad Fraser's cult hit Wolfboy in Toronto. He also appeared in a Coca-Cola commercial in 1983, and in the National Film Board of Canada (NFB) coming-of-age, short film One Step Away. Reeves later said that, when he was looking for work in the mid-1980s, his agents advised him to go by a different name because his first name was "too ethnic". He briefly initialized his first and middle name and attended auditions as "K. C." or "Casey" Reeves before reverting to Keanu.

In 1986, Reeves made a foray into television films, including NBC's Babes in Toyland, Act of Vengeance and Brotherhood of Justice. He made his first motion picture appearances in Peter Markle's Youngblood, in which he played a goalkeeper, and in the low-budget romantic drama, Flying. He was cast as Matt in River's Edge, a crime drama about a group of high school friends dealing with a murder case, loosely based on the 1981 murder of Marcy Renee Conrad. The film premiered in 1986 at the Toronto International Film Festival to a largely positive response. Janet Maslin of The New York Times describes the performances of the young cast as "natural and credible", with Reeves being described as "affecting and sympathetic".

In 1988, Reeves starred in several dramas aimed at teen audiences, including as the lead in The Night Before, a comedy starring opposite Lori Loughlin, The Prince of Pennsylvania and Permanent Record. Although the latter received mixed reviews, Variety magazine praised Reeves's performance, "which opens up nicely as the drama progresses". His other acting efforts included a supporting role in Dangerous Liaisons, which earned seven nominations at the 61st Academy Awards, winning three: Best Adapted Screenplay, Best Costume Design, and Best Production Design.

In 1989, Reeves starred in Bill & Ted's Excellent Adventure, in which he portrays a slacker who travels through time with a friend (portrayed by Alex Winter), to assemble historical figures for a school presentation. The film was generally well received by critics and grossed $40.5 million at the worldwide box office. Film review aggregator Rotten Tomatoes gave the film a 79% approval rating with the critical consensus: "Keanu Reeves and Alex Winter are just charming, goofy, and silly enough to make this fluffy time-travel Adventure work". Reeves then starred in the comedy-drama Parenthood directed by Ron Howard. Nick Hilditch of the BBC gave the film three out of five stars, calling it a "feelgood movie" with an "extensive and entertaining ensemble cast". In 1990, Reeves gave two acting performances; he portrayed an incompetent hitman in the black comedy I Love You to Death, and played Martin, a radio station employee in the comedy Tune in Tomorrow. He also appeared in Paula Abdul's music video for "Rush Rush" which featured a Rebel Without a Cause (1955) motif, with him in the James Dean role.

=== 1991–1994: Breakthrough with mature roles ===
In 1991, Reeves starred in Bill & Ted's Bogus Journey, a sequel to Bill & Ted's Excellent Adventure, with his co-star Winter. Michael Wilmington of the Los Angeles Times wrote that the sequel was "more imaginative, more opulent, wilder and freer, more excitingly visualized", praising the actors for their "fuller" performances. Film critic Roger Ebert thought it was "a riot of visual invention and weird humour that works on its chosen sub-moronic level [...] It's the kind of movie where you start out snickering in spite of yourself, and end up actually admiring the originality that went into creating this hallucinatory slapstick". The rest of 1991 marked a significant transition for Reeves's career as he undertook adult roles. Co-starring with River Phoenix as a street hustler in the adventure My Own Private Idaho, the characters embark on a journey of personal discovery. The story was written by Gus Van Sant, and is loosely based on William Shakespeare's Henry IV, Part 1, Henry IV, Part 2, and Henry V. The film premiered at the 48th Venice International Film Festival, followed by a theatrical release in the United States on September 29, 1991. The film earned $6.4 million at the box office. My Own Private Idaho was positively received, with Owen Gleiberman of Entertainment Weekly describing the film as "a postmodern road movie with a mood of free-floating, trance-like despair [...] a rich, audacious experience". The New York Times complimented Reeves and Phoenix for their insightful performances.

Reeves starred alongside Patrick Swayze, Lori Petty and Gary Busey in the action thriller Point Break, directed by Kathryn Bigelow. He plays an undercover FBI agent tasked with investigating the identities of a group of bank robbers. To prepare for the film, Reeves and his co-stars took surfing lessons with professional surfer Dennis Jarvis in Hawaii; Reeves had never surfed before. Upon its release, Point Break was generally well-received, and a commercial success, earning $83.5 million at the box office. Reeves's performance was praised by The New York Times for "considerable discipline and range", adding, "He moves easily between the buttoned-down demeanour that suits a police procedural story and the loose-jointed manner of his comic roles". Writing for The Washington Post, Hal Hinson called Reeves the "perfect choice" and praised the surfing scenes, but opined that "the filmmakers have their characters make the most ludicrously illogical choices imaginable". At the 1992 MTV Movie Awards, Reeves won the Most Desirable Male award.

In 1991, Reeves developed an interest in a music career; he formed the alternative rock band Dogstar, consisting of members Robert Mailhouse, Gregg Miller and Bret Domrose. Reeves played the bass guitar. A year later, he played Jonathan Harker in Francis Ford Coppola's Gothic horror Bram Stoker's Dracula, based on Stoker's 1897 novel Dracula, starring alongside Gary Oldman, Winona Ryder and Anthony Hopkins. The film was critically and commercially successful: it grossed $215.8 million worldwide. For his role, Reeves was required to speak with an English accent, which drew some ridicule; "Overly posh and entirely ridiculous, Reeves's performance is as painful as it is hilarious", wrote Limara Salt of Virgin Media. In a retrospective interview in 2015, director Coppola said, "[Reeves] tried so hard [...] He wanted to do it perfectly and in trying to do it perfectly it came off as stilted". Bram Stoker's Dracula was nominated for four Academy Awards, winning three in Best Costume Design, Best Sound Editing and Best Makeup. The film also received four nominations at the British Academy Film Awards.

In 1993, he had a role in Much Ado About Nothing, based on Shakespeare's play of the same name. The film received positive reviews, although Reeves was nominated for a Golden Raspberry Award for Worst Supporting Actor. The New Republic magazine thought his casting was "unfortunate" because of his amateur performance. In that same year, he starred in two more drama films, Even Cowgirls Get the Blues and Little Buddha, both of which garnered a mixed-to-negative reception. The Independent critic gave Little Buddha a mixed review but opined that Reeves's part as a prince was "credible". The film also left an impression on Reeves; he later said, "When I played this innocent prince who starts to suspect something when he has the first revelations about old age, sickness and death, it hit me. [...] That lesson has never left me."

In 1994, he starred in the action thriller Speed alongside Sandra Bullock and Dennis Hopper. He plays police officer Jack Traven, who must prevent a bus from exploding by keeping its speed above 50 mph. Speed was the directorial debut of Dutch director Jan de Bont. Several actors were considered for the lead role, but Reeves was chosen because de Bont was impressed with his Point Break performance. To look the part, Reeves shaved all his hair off and spent two months in the gym to gain muscle mass. During production, Reeves's friend and his My Own Private Idaho co-star River Phoenix died, resulting in adjustments to the filming schedule to allow him to mourn. Speed was released on June 10 to a critically acclaimed response. Gene Siskel of the Chicago Tribune lauded Reeves, calling him "absolutely charismatic [...] giving a performance juiced with joy as he jumps through elevator shafts [...] and atop a subway train". David Ansen, writing for Newsweek, summarized Speed as, "Relentless without being overbearing, this is one likely blockbuster that doesn't feel too big for its britches. It's a friendly juggernaut". The film grossed $350 million from a $30 million budget and won two Academy Awards in 1995 – Best Sound Editing and Best Sound. He was voted Sexiest Man Alive the same year.

=== 1995–1998: Career fluctuations ===
I do love it [Shakespeare]. It's like this kind of code that once you start to inhabit it with breath and sound and feeling and thought, it is the most powerful and consuming and freeing at the same time. Just, literally, elemental in sound, consonants and vowels. What I found out in doing it [Hamlet] was that it brought up for me all the anger that was inside me for my mother. I mean, it surprised me, just what was there, and I hadn't seen that before.

— Reeves on his Hamlet performance

Reeves's next leading role came in the 1995 cyberpunk action thriller Johnny Mnemonic, directed by artist Robert Longo and based on the 1981 short story by William Gibson. Set in 2021, it is about a man who has a cybernetic brain implant and must deliver a data package before he dies or is killed by the yakuza. The film received mainly negative reviews and critics felt Reeves was "woefully miscast". Roger Ebert opined that the film is one of the "great goofy gestures of recent cinema, a movie that doesn't deserve one nanosecond of serious analysis but has a kind of idiotic grandeur that makes you almost forgive it." He next appeared in the romantic drama A Walk in the Clouds, which also garnered mixed-to-negative reviews. Reeves plays a young soldier returning home from World War II, trying to settle down with a woman he married impulsively just before he enlisted. Film critic Mick LaSalle opined that "A Walk in the Clouds is for the most part a beautiful, well-acted and emotionally rich picture", whereas Hal Hinson from The Washington Post said, "The film has the syrupy, Kodak magic-moment look of a Bo Derek movie, and pretty much the same level of substance".

Besides film work, Reeves retreated briefly to the theatre playing Prince Hamlet in a 1995 Manitoba Theatre Centre production of Hamlet in Winnipeg, Manitoba. The Sunday Times critic Roger Lewis believed his performance, writing he "quite embodied the innocence, the splendid fury, the animal grace of the leaps and bounds, the emotional violence, that form the Prince of Denmark ... He is one of the top three Hamlets I have seen, for a simple reason: he is Hamlet". In 1996, Reeves was soon drawn to science fiction roles, appearing in Chain Reaction with co-stars Morgan Freeman, Rachel Weisz, Fred Ward, Kevin Dunn and Brian Cox. He plays a researcher of a green energy project, who has to go on the run when he is framed for murder. The film gained a mostly negative reaction; review aggregator Rotten Tomatoes gave it a rating of 16% and described it as "a man-on-the-run thriller that mostly sticks to generic formula". Reeves's film choices after Chain Reaction were also critical disappointments. He starred in the independent crime comedy Feeling Minnesota, with Vincent D'Onofrio and Cameron Diaz, which was described as "shoddily assembled, and fundamentally miscast" by Rotten Tomatoes.

Reeves turned down an offer to star in the 1997 film Speed 2: Cruise Control, despite being offered a salary of $12 million. According to Reeves, this decision caused 20th Century Fox to sever ties with him for a decade. In the summer of 1996, Reeves went on tour with Dogstar in Europe, and next appeared in the drama The Last Time I Committed Suicide, based on a 1950 letter written by Neal Cassady to Jack Kerouac. Reeves's performance gained mixed reviews; Paul Tatara of CNN called him "void of talent [...] here he is again, reciting his lines as if they're non-related words strung together as a memory exercise", whereas Empire magazine thought "Reeves gives the nearest thing to a performance in his career as the enthusiastic feckless drunk". He starred in the 1997 supernatural horror The Devil's Advocate alongside Al Pacino and Charlize Theron; Reeves agreed to a pay cut of several million dollars so that the film studio could afford to hire Pacino. Based on Andrew Neiderman's novel of the same name, the feature is about a successful young lawyer invited to New York City to work for a major firm, who discovers the owner of the firm is a devil. The Devil's Advocate attracted positive reviews from critics. Film critic James Berardinelli called the film "highly enjoyable" and wrote, "There are times when Reeves lacks the subtlety that would have made this a more multi-layered portrayal, but it's nevertheless a solid job".

=== 1999–2004: Resurgence with The Matrix franchise and comedies ===
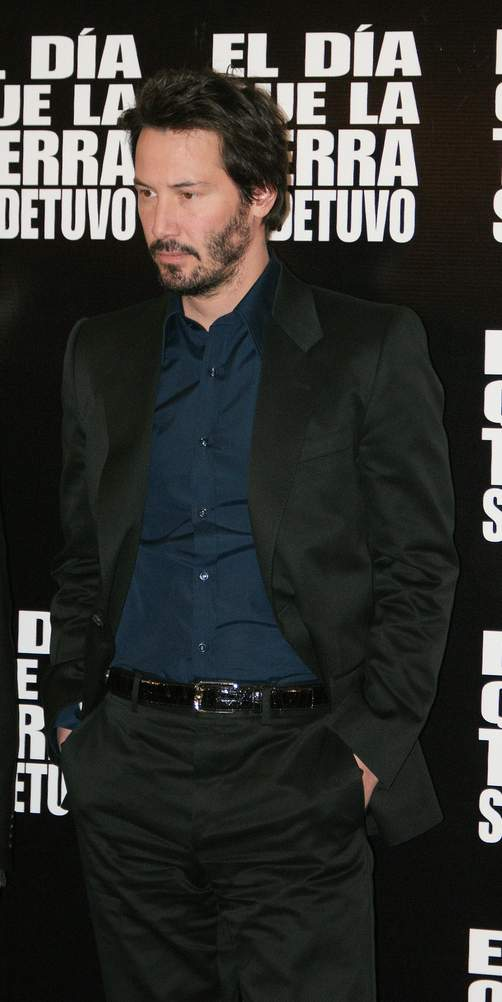
Reeves promoting The Day the Earth Stood Still in Mexico, 2009

In 1999, Reeves starred in the critically acclaimed science fiction film The Matrix, the first installment in what would become The Matrix franchise. Reeves portrays computer programmer Thomas Anderson, a hacker using the alias "Neo", who discovers humanity is trapped inside a simulated reality created by intelligent machines. To prepare for the film, which was written and directed by the Wachowskis, Reeves had read Kevin Kelly's Out of Control: The New Biology of Machines, Social Systems, and the Economic World, and Dylan Evans's ideas on evolutionary psychology. The principal cast underwent months of intense training with martial arts choreographer Yuen Woo-ping to prepare for the fight scenes. The Matrix proved to be a box office success; several critics considered it to be one of the best science fiction films of all time. Kenneth Turan of the Los Angeles Times felt it was a "wildly cinematic futuristic thriller that is determined to overpower the imagination", despite perceiving weaknesses in the film's dialogue. Janet Maslin of The New York Times credited Reeves for being a "strikingly chic Prada model of an action hero", and thought the martial arts stunts were the film's strongest feature. The Matrix received Academy Awards for Best Film Editing, Best Sound Editing, Best Visual Effects, and Best Sound.

After the success of The Matrix, Reeves avoided another blockbuster in favour of the 2000 sports comedy The Replacements. He agreed to a pay cut to enable Gene Hackman to co-star in the film. Against his wishes, Reeves starred in the thriller The Watcher, playing a serial killer who stalks a retired FBI agent. He said that a friend forged his signature on a contract, which he could not prove; he appeared in the film to avoid legal action. Upon its release, the film was critically panned. That year, he had a supporting role in another thriller, Sam Raimi's The Gift, a story about a woman (played by Cate Blanchett) with extrasensory perception asked to help find a young woman who disappeared. The film grossed $44 million worldwide. Film critic Paul Clinton of CNN thought the film was fairly compelling, saying of Reeves's acting: "[Raimi] managed to get a performance out of Reeves that only occasionally sounds like he's reading his lines from the back of a cereal box."

In 2001, Reeves continued to explore and accept roles in a diverse range of genres. The first was a romantic drama, Sweet November, a remake of the 1968 film. This was his second collaboration with Charlize Theron; the film was met with a generally negative reception. Desson Thompson of The Washington Post criticized it for its "syrupy cliches, greeting-card wisdom and over-the-top tragicomedy", but commended Reeves for his likability factor in every performance he gives. Later that year, Hardball marked Reeves's attempt in another sports comedy. Directed by Brian Robbins, it is based on the book Hardball: A Season in the Projects by Daniel Coyle. Reeves plays Conor O'Neill, a troubled young man who agrees to coach a Little League team from the Cabrini Green housing project in Chicago as a condition of obtaining a loan. Film critic Roger Ebert noted the film's desire to tackle difficult subjects and baseball coaching, but felt it lacked depth, and Reeves's performance was "glum and distant".

By 2002, his professional music career had come to an end when Dogstar disbanded. The band had released two albums during their decade together; Our Little Visionary in 1996 and Happy Ending in 2000. Sometime afterwards, Reeves performed in the band Becky for a year, founded by Dogstar band-mate Mailhouse, but quit in 2005, citing a lack of interest in a serious music career. After being absent from the screen in 2002, Reeves returned to The Matrix sequels in 2003 with The Matrix Reloaded and The Matrix Revolutions, released in May and November, respectively. Principal photography for both films was completed back-to-back, primarily at Fox Studios in Australia. The Matrix Reloaded garnered mostly favourable reviews; John Powers of LA Weekly praised the "dazzling pyrotechnics" but was critical of certain machine-like action scenes. Of Reeves's acting, Powers thought it was somewhat "wooden" but felt he has the ability to "exude a charmed aura". Andrew Walker, writing for the Evening Standard, praised the cinematography "visually it gives full value as a virtuoso workout for your senses" but he was less taken by the film's "dime-store philosophy". The film grossed $739 million worldwide.

The Matrix Revolutions, the third installment, was met with mixed reception. According to review aggregator Rotten Tomatoes, the consensus was that "characters and ideas take a back seat to the special effects". Paul Clinton, writing for CNN, praised the special effects but felt Reeves's character was unfocused. In contrast, the San Francisco Chronicle's Carla Meyer was highly critical of the special effects, writing, "[The Wachowskis] computer-generated imagery goes from dazzling to deadening in action scenes that favor heavy, clanking weaponry over the martial-arts moves that thrilled viewers of The Matrix and The Matrix Reloaded." Nevertheless, the film grossed $427 million worldwide, although less than the two previous films. Something's Gotta Give, a romantic comedy, was Reeves's last release of 2003. He co-starred with Jack Nicholson and Diane Keaton, and played Dr. Julian Mercer in the film. Something's Gotta Give received generally favourable reviews.

=== 2005–2013: Thrillers, documentaries and directorial debut ===
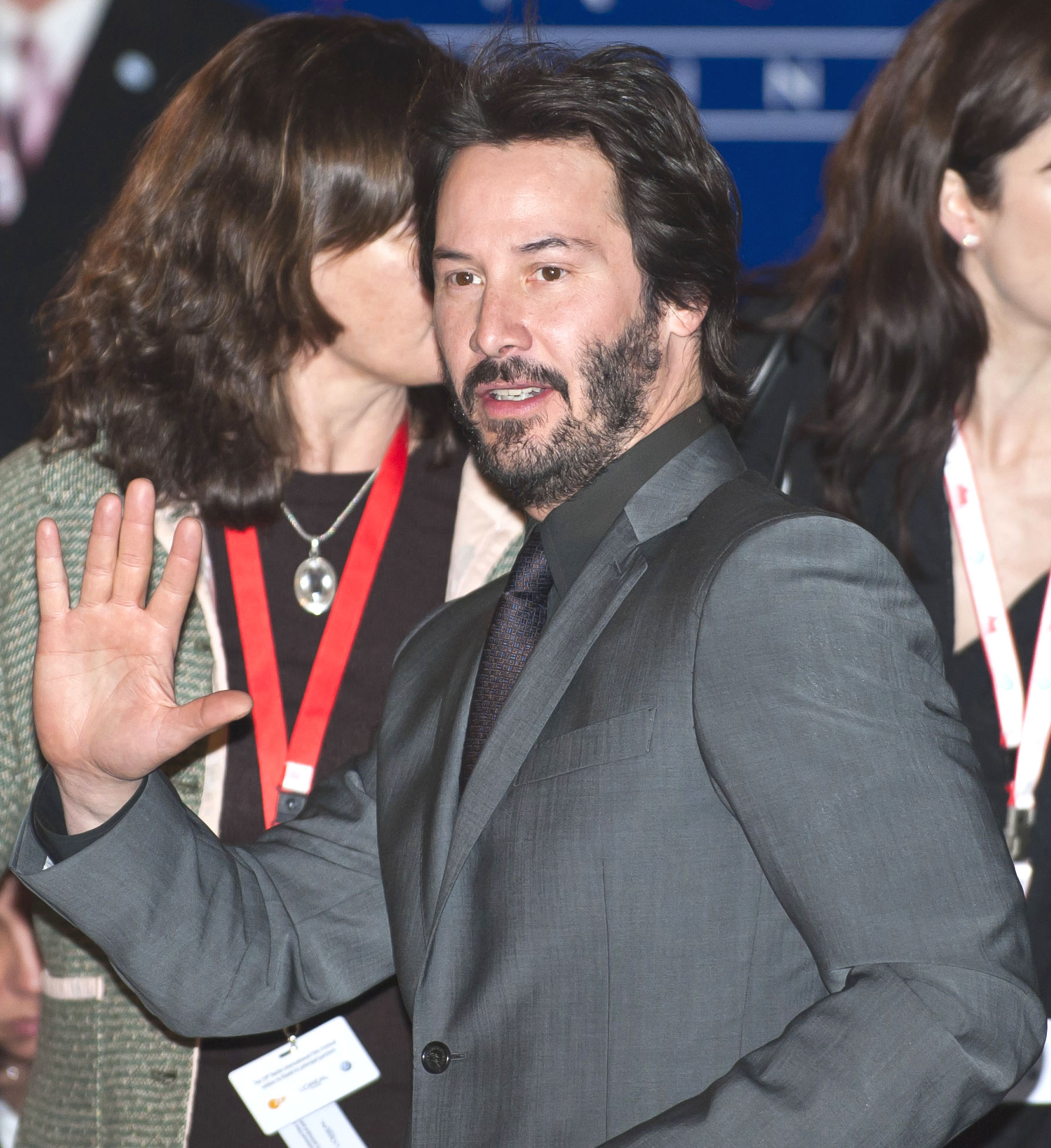
Reeves at the Berlin International Film Festival in 2009

In 2005, Reeves played John Constantine in Constantine, an occult detective film, about a man who has the ability to perceive and communicate with half-angels and half-demons. The film was a respectable box office hit, grossing $230 million worldwide from a $100 million budget but attracted mixed-to-positive reviews. The Sydney Morning Herald's critic wrote that "Constantine isn't bad, but it doesn't deserve any imposing adjectives. It's occasionally cheesy, sometimes enjoyable, intermittently scary, and constantly spiked with celestial blatherskite". He next appeared in Thumbsucker, which premiered at the Sundance Film Festival in 2005. A comedy adapted from the 1999 novel by Walter Kirn, the story follows a boy with a thumb-sucking problem. Reeves and the cast garnered positive critical reviews, with The Washington Post describing it as "a gently stirring symphony about emotional transition filled with lovely musical passages and softly nuanced performances".

In 2006, Reeves appeared in the Richard Linklater-directed animated science fiction thriller A Scanner Darkly, which premiered at the 2006 Cannes Film Festival. Reeves played Bob Arctor/Fred, an undercover agent in a futuristic dystopia under high-tech police surveillance. Based on the 1977 novel by Philip K. Dick, the film was a box office failure. However, the film attracted generally favourable reviews; Paul Arendt of the BBC thought the film was "beautiful to watch", but that Reeves was outshone by his co-star Robert Downey Jr. His next role was Alex Wyler in The Lake House, a romantic drama adaptation of the 2000 South Korean film Il Mare, which reunited him with Sandra Bullock. Despite its box office success, Mark Kermode of The Guardian was highly critical, writing "this syrup-drenched supernatural whimsy achieves stupidity at a genuinely international level [...] The last time Bullock and Reeves were together on screen the result was Speed. This should have been entitled Stop". Towards the end of 2006, he co-narrated The Great Warming with Alanis Morissette, a documentary about climate change mitigation.

In 2008, Reeves collaborated with director David Ayer on the crime thriller Street Kings. He played an undercover policeman who must clear his name after the death of another officer. Released on April 11, the film grossed a moderate $66 million worldwide. The film's plot and Reeves' performance, however, were met with mostly unenthusiastic reviews. Paul Byrnes of The Sydney Morning Herald stated, "It's full of twists and turns, a dead body in every reel, but it's not difficult to work out who's betraying whom, and that's just not good enough". The Guardian opined that "Reeves is fundamentally blank and uninteresting". Reeves starred in another science fiction film, The Day the Earth Stood Still, a loose adaptation of the 1951 film. He portrayed Klaatu, an alien sent from outer space to try to change human behaviour or eradicate humans because of their environmental impact. At the 2009 Razzie Awards, the film was nominated for Worst Prequel, Remake, Rip-off or Sequel. Many critics were unimpressed with the heavy use of special effects; The Telegraph credited Reeves's ability to engage the audience, but thought the cinematography was abysmal and the "sub-Al-Gore environment lecture leaves you light-headed with tedium".

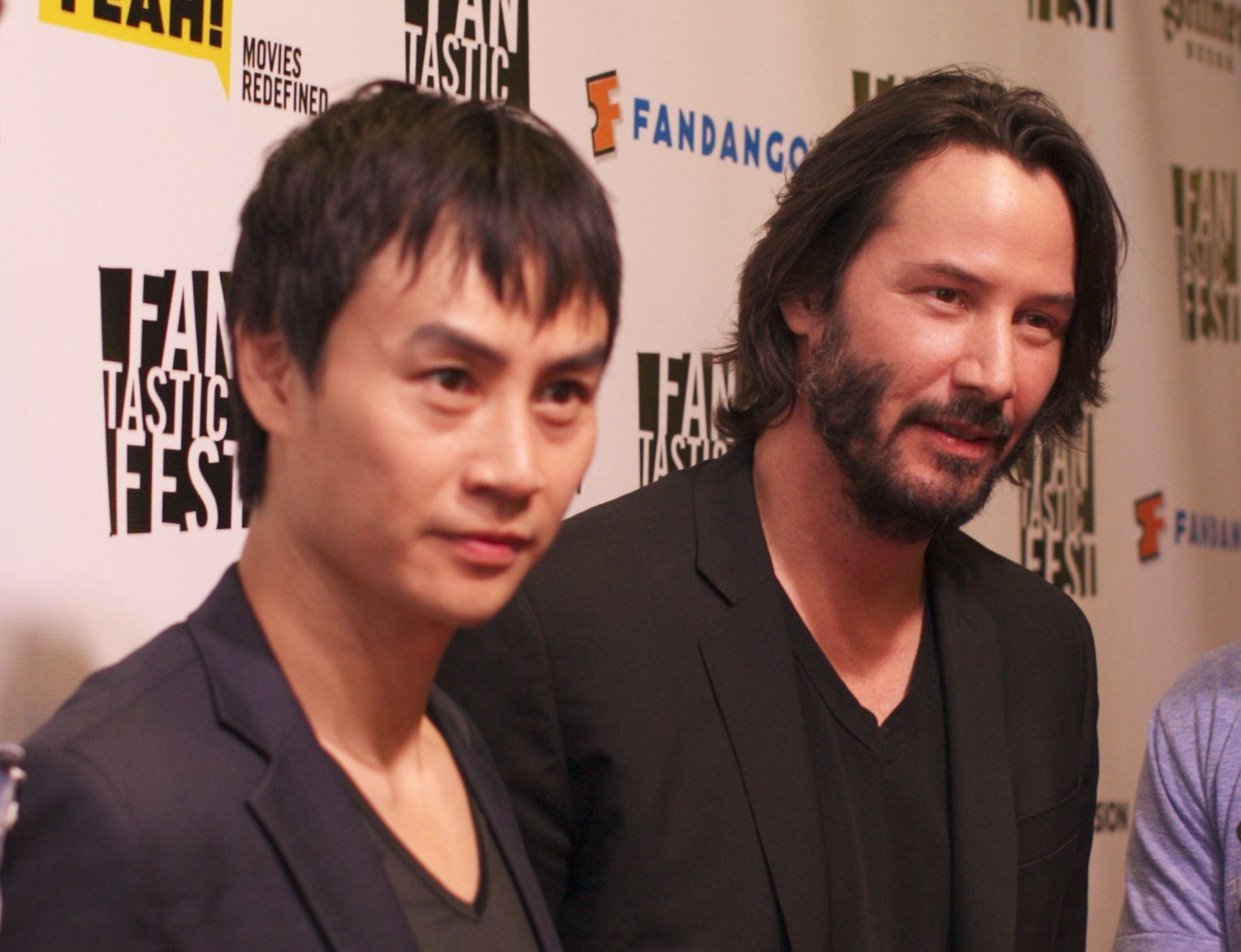
Tiger Chen and Reeves at the 2013 Fantastic Fest

Rebecca Miller's The Private Lives of Pippa Lee was Reeves's sole release of 2009, which premiered at the 59th Berlin International Film Festival. The romantic comedy and its ensemble received an amicable review from The Telegraph's David Gritten; "Miller's film is a triumph. Uniformly well acted, it boasts a psychologically knowing script, clearly written by a smart, assertive human". In 2010, he starred in another romantic comedy, Henry's Crime, about a man who is released from prison for a crime he did not commit, but then targets the same bank with his former cellmate. The film was not a box office hit. Reeves's only work in 2011 was an adult picture book titled Ode to Happiness, which he wrote, complemented by Alexandra Grant's illustrations. Reeves co-produced and appeared in a 2012 documentary, Side by Side. He interviewed filmmakers including James Cameron, Martin Scorsese, and Christopher Nolan; the feature investigated digital and photochemical film creation. Reeves then starred in Generation Um..., an independent drama which was critically panned.

In 2013, Reeves starred in his own directorial debut, the martial arts film Man of Tai Chi. The film has multilingual dialogue and follows a young man drawn to an underground fight club, partially inspired by the life of Reeves' friend Tiger Chen. Principal photography took place in China and in Hong Kong. Reeves was also assisted by Yuen Woo-ping, the fight choreographer of The Matrix films. Man of Tai Chi premiered at the Beijing Film Festival and the Cannes Film Festival, and received praise from director John Woo. A wider, warm response followed suit; Bilge Ebiri of Vulture thought the fight sequences were "beautifully assembled", and Reeves showed restraint with the film editing to present the fighters' motion sequences. The Los Angeles Times wrote, "The brutally efficient shooting style Reeves employs to film master choreographer Yuen Woo-ping's breathtaking fights [...] is refreshingly grounded and old-school kinetic", while Dave McGinn of The Globe and Mail called the film "ambitious but generic". At the box office, Man of Tai Chi was a commercial disappointment, grossing only $5.5 million worldwide from a budget of $25 million. Also in 2013, Reeves played Kai in the fantasy 47 Ronin, a Japanese fable about a group of rogue samurai. The film premiered in Japan but failed to gain traction with audiences; reviews were not positive, causing Universal Pictures to reduce advertising for the film elsewhere. 47 Ronin was a box office flop and was mostly poorly received.

=== 2014–2022: Resurgence with John Wick ===
In 2014, after another series of commercial failures, Reeves made a career comeback, playing the title role in the action thriller John Wick, directed by Chad Stahelski. In the first installment of the John Wick franchise, Reeves plays a retired hitman seeking vengeance. He worked closely with the screenwriter to develop the story; "We all agreed on the potential of the project. I love the role, but you want the whole story, the whole ensemble to come to life", Reeves said. Filmed on location in the New York City area, the film was eventually released on October 24 in the United States. The Hollywood Reporter was impressed by the director's "confident, muscular action debut", and Reeves's "effortless" performance, which marked his return to the action genre. Jeannette Catsoulis of The New York Times praised Reeves's fight scenes and wrote he is "always more comfortable in roles that demand cool over hot, attitude over emotion". John Wick proved to be a box office success, grossing $86 million worldwide. In 2015, Reeves starred in a smaller-scale horror feature, Knock Knock, a remake of the 1977 film Death Game. Described as "over-the-top destruction" by the Toronto Star, Reeves plays a father, home alone, when two young women show up and start a game of cat and mouse. His other releases in 2015 were the documentaries Deep Web, about crime on the dark web, and Mifune: The Last Samurai, about the life of Toshiro Mifune, famous for playing samurai characters. He narrated both films.

Reeves appeared in five film releases in 2016. The first was Exposed, a crime thriller about a detective who investigates his partner's death and discovers police corruption along the way. The film received negative reviews for its confused plot, and Reeves was criticized for displaying limited facial expressions. His next release, the comedy Keanu, was better received. In it he voiced the eponymous kitten. Reeves then had a minor role in The Neon Demon, a psychological horror directed by Nicolas Winding Refn. He played Hank, a lustful motel owner who appears in Jesse's (played by Elle Fanning) nightmare. In his fourth release, he played a charismatic leader of a settlement in The Bad Batch. His final release of the year was The Whole Truth, featuring Gabriel Basso, Gugu Mbatha-Raw, Renée Zellweger, and Jim Belushi. He played Richard, a defence attorney. Noel Murray of The A.V. Club described it as "moderately clever, reasonably entertaining courtroom drama", with a skilled cast but overall a "mundane" film. Reeves also appeared in Swedish Dicks, a two-season web television series.

In 2017, Reeves agreed to reprise his role for a sequel in the John Wick franchise, John Wick: Chapter 2. The story carries on from the first film and follows John Wick as he goes on the run when a bounty is placed on him. The film was a critical and commercial success, grossing $171.5 million worldwide, more than its predecessor. Chris Hewitt of Empire magazine praised Reeves's performance, which complemented his previous action roles in Point Break and Speed. However, Justin Chang of the Los Angeles Times described the picture as "a down-and-dirty B-picture with a lustrous A-picture soul". Reeves then starred in a drama, To the Bone, in which he plays a doctor helping a young woman with anorexia. It premiered at the 2017 Sundance Film Festival, followed by distribution on Netflix in July. Early reviews were positive, with praise for its non-glamorized portrayal of anorexia, although the New Statesman magazine thought it was irresponsible. That year, Reeves also made cameo appearances in the films A Happening of Monumental Proportions and SPF-18.

In 2018, Reeves reunited with Winona Ryder in the comedy Destination Wedding, about wedding guests who develop a mutual affection for each other. They had worked together previously in Bram Stoker's Dracula, A Scanner Darkly and The Private Lives of Pippa Lee. Reeves also co-produced and starred in two thrillers. Siberia, in which he plays a diamond trader who travels to Siberia to search for his Russian partner, and Replicas, which tells the story of a neuroscientist who violates laws and bioethics to bring his family back to life after they die in a car crash. Siberia was critically panned; reviewers thought the plot was nonsensical and Reeves had little chemistry with co-star Ana Ularu. Replicas did not fare well with critics either; The A.V. Club praised Reeves's performance, but gave the film a grade D−, adding it is "garbage". It was also a box office failure, earning $9.3 million from a budget of $30 million.

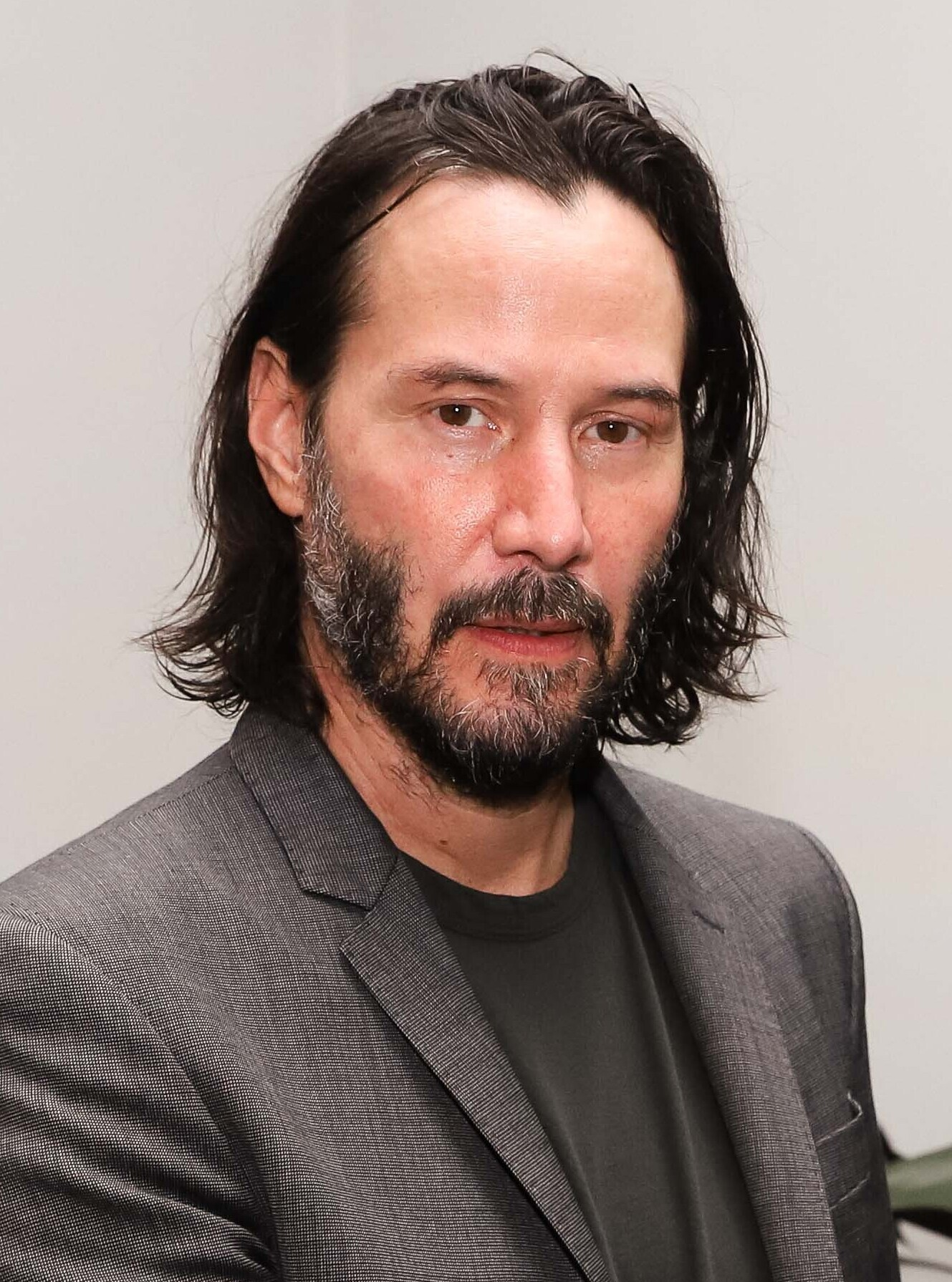
Reeves in 2019

In 2019, Reeves starred in John Wick: Chapter 3 – Parabellum, the third film in the series directed by Stahelski. The film takes place immediately after the events of John Wick: Chapter 2 and features new cast members including Halle Berry. The film was another box office hit, grossing $171 million in the United States and more than $155 million internationally. The Globe and Mail's reviewer gave the film three out of four stars, praising the fight scenes, but felt there was "aesthetic overindulgence" with the cinematography. The Guardian's Cath Clarke questioned Reeves's acting; she wrote that "he keeps his face statue-still [...] three movies in, franchise bloat is beginning to set in". Reeves was nominated for Favorite Male Movie Star of 2019 in the People's Choice Awards, and the film itself was nominated for Best Contemporary Film in the Art Directors Guild Awards. Reeves then voiced Duke Caboom in Toy Story 4, the fourth installment of Pixar's Toy Story franchise. In that same year on April 27 and 28, a film festival was held in his honour, called KeanuCon, hosted in Glasgow, Scotland. Over two days, nine of his films were screened for guests. Also in 2019, Reeves played a supporting role as himself in the Ali Wong-led romantic comedy Always Be My Maybe. In 2019, Reeves travelled to São Paulo to produce a Netflix series, Conquest. Footage shot for the project would remain in development hell for years due to creator Carl Rinsch's erratic behaviour and mental health state, which caused him to miss several deadlines and enter litigation with Netflix over the rights to the series.

As early as 2008, Reeves and Alex Winter had shown enthusiasm for a third Bill & Ted film, but the project went into development limbo. In 2020, the third film in the franchise Bill & Ted Face the Music was released. The critic from Salon magazine was disappointed in Reeves's performance, but praised the film for its message that "music has the power to unite the world". Leah Greenblatt of Entertainment Weekly gave the film a grade B, and complimented the onscreen chemistry between Reeves and Winter. He also appeared in The SpongeBob Movie: Sponge on the Run as a tumbleweed named Sage. Reeves appears as Johnny Silverhand in the video game Cyberpunk 2077. In December 2021, Reeves returned to the screen for the fourth film in The Matrix franchise: The Matrix Resurrections. Carrie-Anne Moss also reprised her role as Trinity. The Matrix Resurrections was a box office disappointment; one critic praised Reeves's and Moss's performances, but thought the film was "no game-changer".

=== 2023–present: career progression and books ===
In 2023, Reeves reprised his role as the title character in John Wick: Chapter 4. It received critical acclaim; several reviewers cited the film among the greatest action films ever made. He also reprised his role as Johnny Silverhand in the Cyberpunk 2077 expansion, Phantom Liberty. A comic book series, BRZRKR, co-written by Reeves was published in three volumes starting in March 2021 and concluding in October 2023. Issue #1 sold over 615,000 copies, making it the top-selling single issue since Star Wars #1 in 2015.

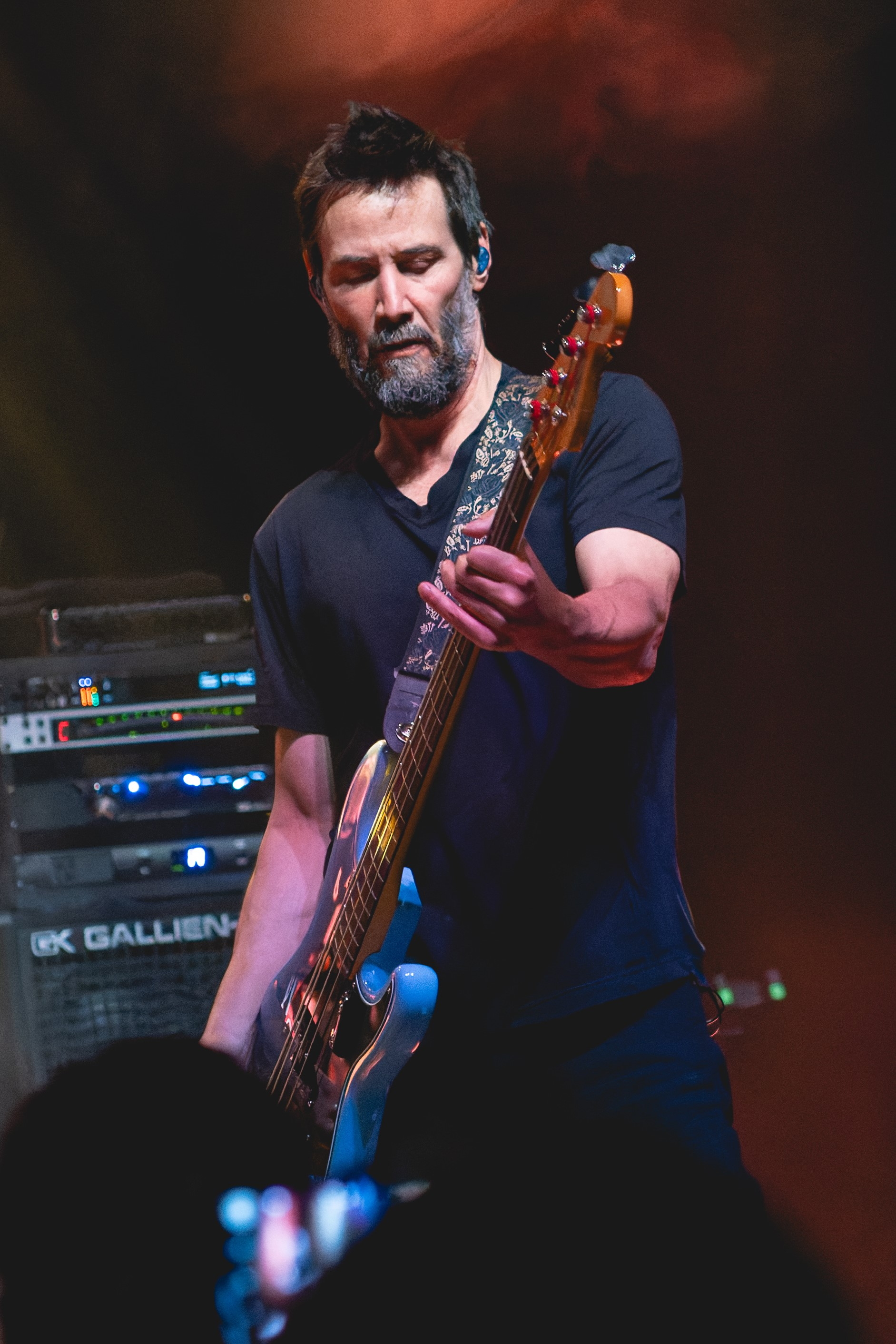
Reeves performing with Dogstar in 2024

After occasional jam sessions in the years following Dogstar's dissolution, the band began recording new songs during the start of the COVID-19 pandemic, which turned into album: Somewhere Between the Power Lines and Palm Trees (2023). Following their first performance in 20 years at BottleRock Napa Valley music festival, Reeves and the band embarked on a 25-date tour in North America and Japan in support of the album, beginning August 10 in Hermosa Beach, California. In July, Boom! Studios published the first issue of BRZRKR: Bloodlines, titled Poetry of Madness. Reeves appeared as the featured guest for the season 6 premiere episode of Ride with Norman Reedus, titled "The Utah Desert with Keanu Reeves". CinemaBlend's Nick Venable said, "the installment makes for some truly heartwarming viewing for anyone who needs something to smile about". In November 2023, Reeves appeared as the host, and executive producer for the 4-part documentary series Brawn: The Impossible Formula 1 Story for Hulu and Disney+. Jack Seale of The Guardian felt that Reeves was "there to humanize the story", and pointed out his "numerous adorable habits that most interviewers would deem unprofessional, but which don't offend." He felt that much of the emotion in the series owed to the way "he gets his interviewees to open up. He often asks an emotion-based question – how did someone feel about what they did, rather than just what did they do". At the end of that month, Boom! Studios published the second comic in the BRZRKR: Bloodlines series, entitled Fallen Empire.

In May 2024, Netflix won litigation over the rights to the Reeves-produced Conquest series, with the footage reverting to their ownership alongside being reimbursed for $8.78 million worth of creator Carl Erik Rinsch's misused production money. That June, Reeves and Dogstar announced their Summer Vacation Tour, with shows scheduled from August to September in the US and Canada. On July 23, 2024, Reeves published a novel, The Book of Elsewhere, co-written with China Miéville, a telling of the story of BRZRKR. The first issue of the second volume of the Bloodlines series, A Faceful of Bullets, written with Jason Aaron and art by Francesco Manna was released the following day after a delay from June. Another BRZRKR Bloodlines spin-off, titled The Lost Book of B released on August 21, 2024. He joined Graham Hancock in the second season of the series Ancient Apocalypse on Netflix, where he discussed his insights into storytelling as an act of preserving culture. In October 2024, Reeves made his motorsport debut in the Toyota GR Cup North America where he finished in 25th and 24th place in Race 1 and 2, respectively, at the Indianapolis Motor Speedway. Reeves starred in the Armored Core episode of the animated anthology series Secret Level. In April, Reeves was cast as the voice of Shadow the Hedgehog in the third installment of the Sonic the Hedgehog film series, Sonic the Hedgehog 3, which released on December 20, 2024. He also voiced the character in a DLC for the video game Shadow Generations, developed as a tie-in for the film.

In January 2025, Reeves had an uncredited role voicing a stop-motion Lumon building in the second season of the television series Severance. In June 2025, Reeves reprised his role as John Wick in the series spin-off film Ballerina, starring Ana de Armas. Reeves then appeared in the comedy Good Fortune, starring alongside Seth Rogen and Aziz Ansari, the latter's directorial debut. Writing about Reeves' performance, the critic from Rolling Stone thought it was "divine". In September 2025, Reeves made his Broadway debut in a production of Waiting for Godot directed by Jamie Lloyd, alongside Bill & Ted co-star Alex Winter.

Reeves starred in Jonah Hill's black comedy film Outcome which was released on Apple TV+ in 2026.

Dogstar released their fourth studio album on May 29, 2026 "All In Now" with Dillion Street Records.

In June 2026, he reprised his role as the voice of Duke Kaboom in Toy Story 5.

==== Upcoming projects ====
Reeves is set to star in Ruben Östlund's satire film The Entertainment System Is Down. Reeves will co-produce a documentary about the life of Benny Urquidez, directed by Jennifer Tiexiera. Also Reeves is set to star in Tim Miller's science fiction survival film Shiver.

A film adaptation of BRZRKR written by Mattson Tomlin and produced by and starring Reeves is being developed for Netflix, with Reeves open to the possibility of directing. After the release of the film, a two-season anime series also planned for release on Netflix and produced by Production I.G is planned to follow. A fifth film in the John Wick series is currently in the works at Lionsgate with Chad Stahelski set to return as director. Besides plans for a fifth film, a sequel television series titled John Wick: Under the High Table is being developed with Reeves attached as an executive producer. Reeves and former co-star Sandra Bullock are attached to star in a romantic thriller being produced by Amazon MGM. In 2027, Reeves will again voice Shadow the Hedgehog in Sonic the Hedgehog 4.

== Personal life ==
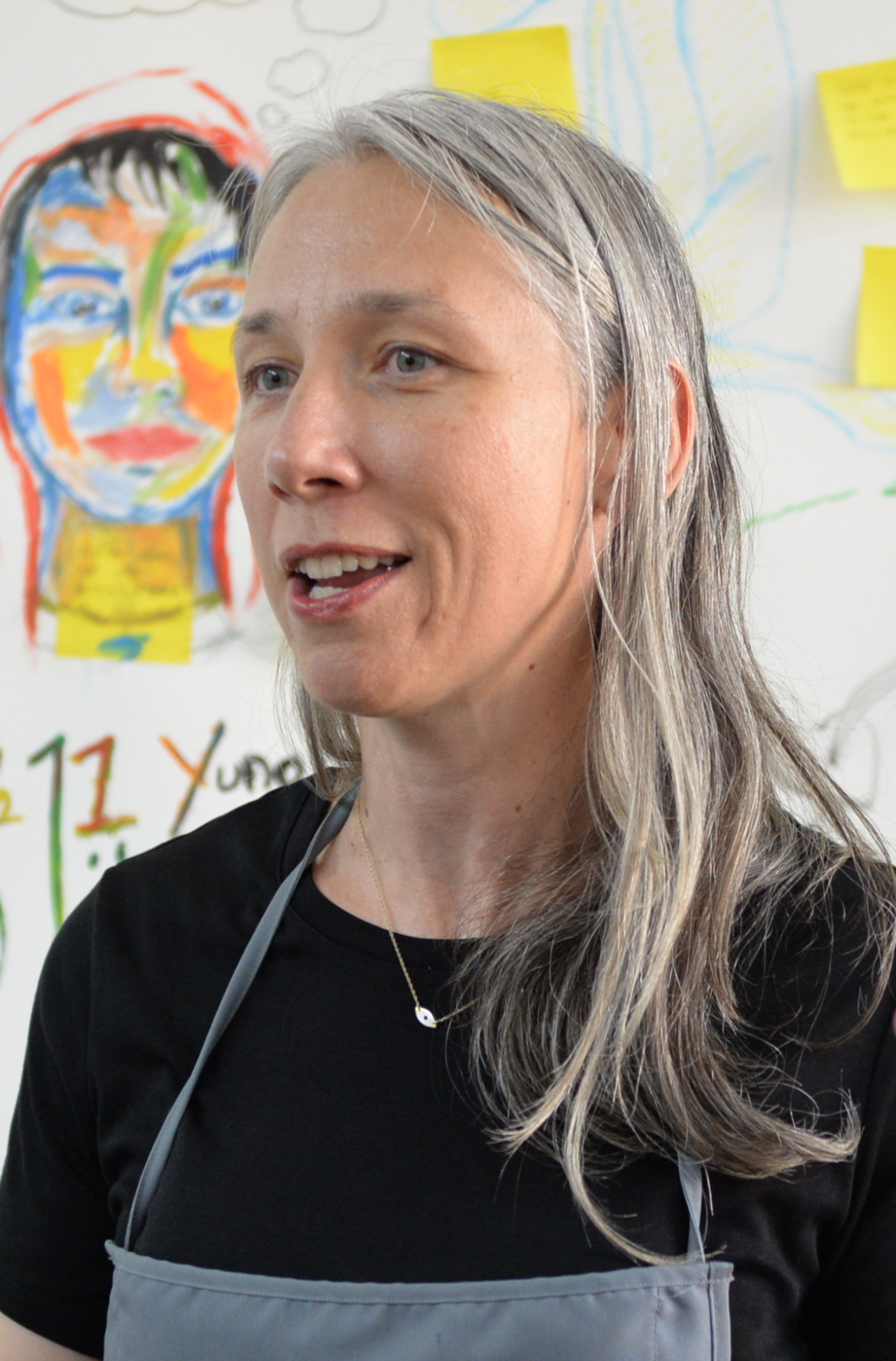
Alexandra Grant in May 2014

In 1998, Reeves met director David Lynch's assistant Jennifer Syme at a party thrown for his band Dogstar, and they started dating. On December 24, 1999, Syme gave birth eight months into her pregnancy to the couple's child, who was stillborn. The couple broke up several weeks afterward, but later reconciled. On April 2, 2001, Syme was killed when her vehicle collided with three parked cars on Cahuenga Boulevard in Los Angeles. Syme had been under the influence and also not belted in. Reeves told investigators that they were back together, and had brunch together in San Francisco the day before the accident. Reeves acted as a pallbearer for Syme, who was buried next to their daughter. He was scheduled to film the sequels to The Matrix the following spring, but sought "peace and time", according to friend Bret Domrose of Dogstar.

Reeves has also been romantically linked to longtime friend and filmmaker Brenda Davis, to whose child he is godfather, and model-actress China Chow. Reeves also maintains a close friendship with his Bram Stoker's Dracula co-star Winona Ryder; after taking part in a wedding scene with a Romanian priest for the film, they still call each other "husband and wife" when speaking personally.

In 2009, Reeves met Alexandra Grant at a dinner party; they went on to collaborate on two books together. They went public with their relationship in November 2019.

Reeves is discreet about his spiritual beliefs, saying that it is something "personal and private". When asked if he was a spiritual person, he said that he believes "in God, faith, inner faith, the self, passion, and things", and that he is "very spiritual". Although he does not formally practice Buddhism, the religion has left a strong impression on him, especially after filming Little Buddha. He said, "Most of the things I've come away with from Buddhism have been human—understanding feelings, impermanence, and trying to understand other people and where they're coming from." In 2024, Reeves spoke on his thoughts about mortality, saying, "I'm thinking about death all the time. That's a good thing. Hopefully it's not crippling, but hopefully it's sensitised [us] to an appreciation of the breath we have, and the relationships that we have the potential to have."

In 1988, Reeves was injured in a motorcycle accident while riding in Topanga; he had to undergo a splenectomy. Reeves was injured again on his motorcycle in 1996 when he swerved to avoid a car that pulled out from the curb.

In 2023, the lipopeptide keanumycin, a substance deadly to fungi, was named in honour of Reeves.

== Business and philanthropy ==
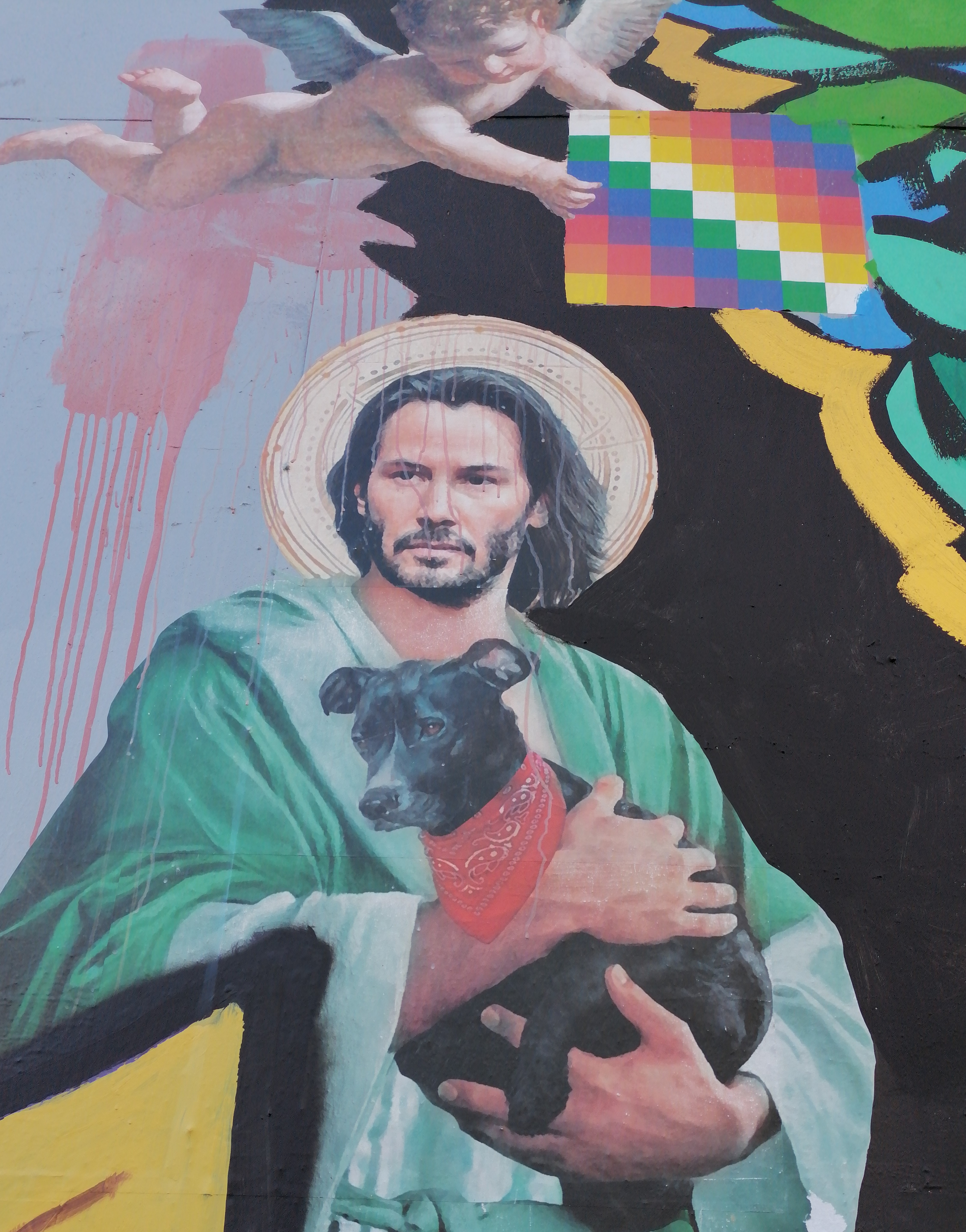
Mural of Reeves in Santiago de Chile

Reeves supports several charities and causes. In response to his sister's battle with leukemia, he founded a private cancer foundation, which aids children's hospitals and provides cancer research. He prefers for the foundation to operate privately, stating in a 2009 interview that he does not like to attach his name to it. In June 2020, he volunteered for Camp Rainbow Gold, an Idaho children's cancer charity. Reeves was also recognized as one of the 100 Influential Celebrities in Oncology by OncoDaily. Reeves has said, "Money is the last thing I think about. I could live on what I have already made for the next few centuries".

It was rumoured that Reeves gave away a substantial portion, estimated to be $35–$125 million, of his earnings from The Matrix to the special effects and makeup crews. However, this has been significantly embellished; Reeves negotiated a smaller deal, relinquishing his contractual right to a percentage of the sequels' profits in exchange for a more extensive special effects budget. During production on that film, Reeves heard that a crew member was having "family trouble", and elected to gift the man $20,000 to help him with his finances. As a wrap gift for the twelve-person stunt team of The Matrix Reloaded (2003), Reeves purchased Harley-Davidson motorcycles for each of the members, saying of the gifts, "I just wanted ... to give a bigger thank-you to all these guys who helped me make this".

After filming John Wick: Chapter 4, Reeves, Chad Stahelski and Brazilian jiu-jitsu instructor Dave Camarillo, signed an exclusive training uniform that was put up for auction in March 2023 to raise money for St. Jude Children's Research Hospital. Reeves also presented his personal stunt team for the film with engraved custom Rolex Submariner watches, and bought the larger Chapter 4 stunt crews each personalized T-shirts indicating how many times that the various extras they portrayed "died" in the film. In 2024, Reeves signed a one-day contract with the Windsor Spitfires, and signed items which were auctioned off in benefit of the Canadian Mental Health Association of Windsor-Essex.

Reeves co-founded a production company, Company Films, with friend Stephen Hamel. In 2011, Reeves, an avid motorcyclist, co-founded ARCH Motorcycle Company, which builds and sells custom motorcycles, with Gard Hollinger.

In 2017, Reeves, Jessica Fleischmann, and Alexandra Grant founded book publisher, X Artists' Books (also known as XAB). He has written two books with Grant: Ode to Happiness and Shadows; he provided the text to her photographs and art.

== In the media ==
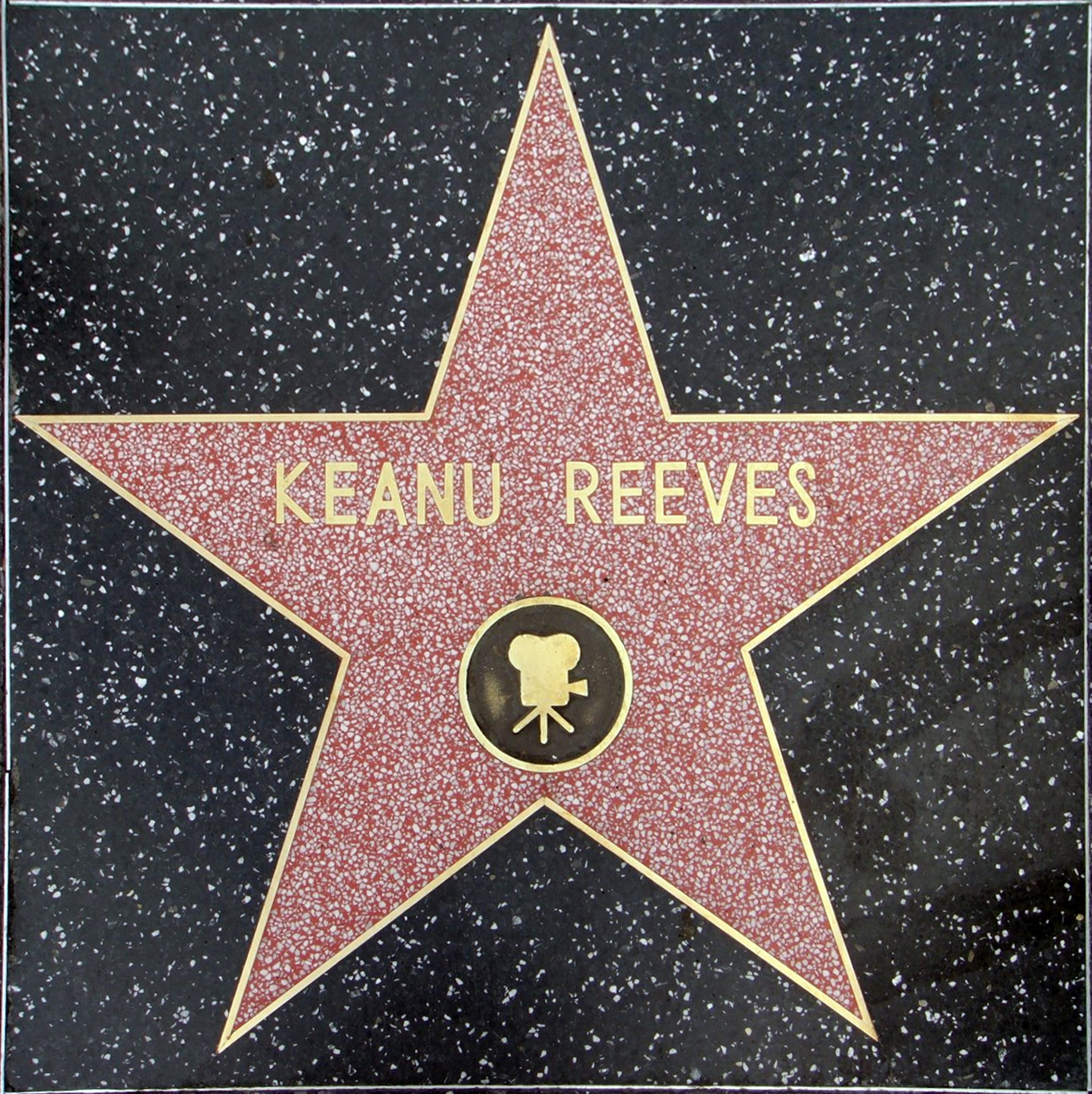
Reeves' star on the Hollywood Walk of Fame

In a 2005 article for Time magazine, Lev Grossman called Reeves "Hollywood's ultimate introvert". He has been described as a workaholic, charming and "excruciatingly shy". During the production of Constantine, director Francis Lawrence commented on his personality, calling him "hardworking" and "generous". His co-star Shia LaBeouf said, "I've worked with him for a year and a couple of months, but I don't really know him that much". Erwin Stoff of 3 Arts Entertainment has served as Reeves's agent and manager since he was 16, and produced many of his films. Stoff said Reeves "is a really private person" and keeps his distance from other people. In 2023, Reeves's frequent collaborator Laurence Fishburne remarked on him, "He's kinder, yeah. He's much kinder than people say he is. He's a very gentle, highly intelligent man. Really thoughtful and gifted and incredibly patient. Yeah, he has a lot of grace, Keanu." Aziz Ansari, who directed and starred with Reeves in Good Fortune, joked that he "actually is an angel", and that "he's been pretending to be human for all these other roles." In a 2024 interview with People magazine, Hiroyuki Sanada said, "He [is] so humble, very kind to others but very hard on himself". [...] He's always trying to do his best: aim higher, move forward".

In 2010, an image of Reeves became an internet meme after photographs of him were published, sitting on a park bench with a sad facial expression. The images were posted on the 4chan discussion board and were soon distributed via several blogs and media outlets, leading to the "Sad Keanu" meme being spread on the internet. An unofficial holiday was created when a Facebook fan page declared June 15 as "Cheer-up Keanu Day". He would later downplay the photo, saying, "Man, I was eating a sandwich. I was thinking—I had some stuff going on. I was hungry."

Reeves's casual persona and ability to establish rapport have been observed by the public, leading him to be dubbed the "Internet's boyfriend". In 2019, Vox named Reeves's unorthodox filmography and ability to appeal to nerd culture as the primary reasons for his internet popularity. The Guardian noted that he holds a reputation as "one of the nicest, humblest guys on the Hollywood A-list", and the BBC wrote that he is known for his "gentle, mild-mannered persona", and is often described as "the nicest man in Hollywood." Time dubbed Reeves as the "master of the fan encounter", and Snopes observed that he is "so beloved that he's a cultural fixture".

In March 2019, Reeves went viral after his United Airlines flight to Burbank, California was grounded in Bakersfield. Taking initiative in arranging alternate travel plans, Reeves boarded a travel van with the other passengers. Reeves read fun facts from his phone about Bakersfield to the passengers, and later used YouTube to share 1950s American country music that was native to the town. Time said of the events, "One thing's for certain after this eventful trip: if you're looking for a road trip buddy, Keanu Reeves should be on the top of your list".

Reeves again gained media attention in May when his appearance on The Late Show with Stephen Colbert went viral. Colbert asked at the end of the show about his views on death, then Reeves answered, "I know that the ones who love us will miss us." The response incited an emotional reaction from the audience, and Colbert shook Reeves's hand before wrapping up the show. Vice's River Donaghey declared that "Keanu is my new religion" in response to the clip, and called the moment "transcendent". The New Yorker called it "a response so wise, so genuinely thoughtful, that it seemed like a rebuke to the usual canned blather of late-night television"—staff writer Naomi Fry recounted that she "felt like [she] was standing alone in a rock garden, having a koan whispered into [her] ear" after watching the viral clip on Twitter. The interaction would later inspire science communicator Hank Green to end his Pissing Out Cancer comedy special, based on his experiences fighting Hodgkin's Lymphoma, with a quote inspired by Reeves's answer; "Either way, what comes next is going to be beautiful". In choosing the ending, he felt that Reeves's words reflected a larger understanding of the human experience.

While filming Bill & Ted Face the Music in July 2019, Reeves and other cast members came across a house with a banner reading "You're Breathtaking" and "Mini Keanu", two memes that had come out of Reeves's appearance at the Electronic Entertainment Expo 2019 for the game Cyberpunk 2077. Reeves took time to sign the banner, and talk to the family. Business Insider reported that the actor's fans were quick to praise him in response to the incident, calling him "good guy Keanu" and lauding him as "the best human on the planet".

Reeves appeared on Forbes' annual Celebrity 100 list in 2001 and 2002, at number 36 and 49, respectively. In 2005, Reeves received a star on the Hollywood Walk of Fame for his contributions to the motion picture industry. In 2016, The Hollywood Reporter calculated that Reeves had earned $250 million for The Matrix franchise, making him one of the highest-paid actors. In 2020, The New York Times ranked him at number four on its list of the 25 Greatest Actors of the 21st Century.

In 2022, Reeves's recitation of the Beat poem "Pull My Daisy" for a virtual benefit concert for Tibet House US, a nonprofit organization affiliated with the exiled Tibetan spiritual leader, the Dalai Lama, stirred a negative reaction from users on Chinese social media. Reeves's films were subsequently banned from streaming platforms in China, including iQiyi, Tencent Video and Youku.

A popular internet meme asserts that Reeves is "secretly immortal" and has lived throughout the last millennia under the identities of several historical figures, including Charlemagne and French actor Paul Mounet. The meme came to media prominence in 2017 when Reeves was asked on The Tonight Show Starring Jimmy Fallon about it. Reeves addressed his resemblance with Charlemagne, saying "We have a likeness in the eyes. And the nose and the mustache and the beard and the cheekbones and the forehead". When asked in a Q&A event for John Wick: Chapter 4 "if he ever ages", Reeves responded, "Yeah man, I age. I really – I age. It's happening, man". In 2023, a website dedicated to chronicling every time Reeves has spoken the word "whoa" in his film career was created by web developer Avi Mamenko to honor him. In 2022, Time magazine named him one of the 100 most influential people in the world.

== Filmography and awards ==
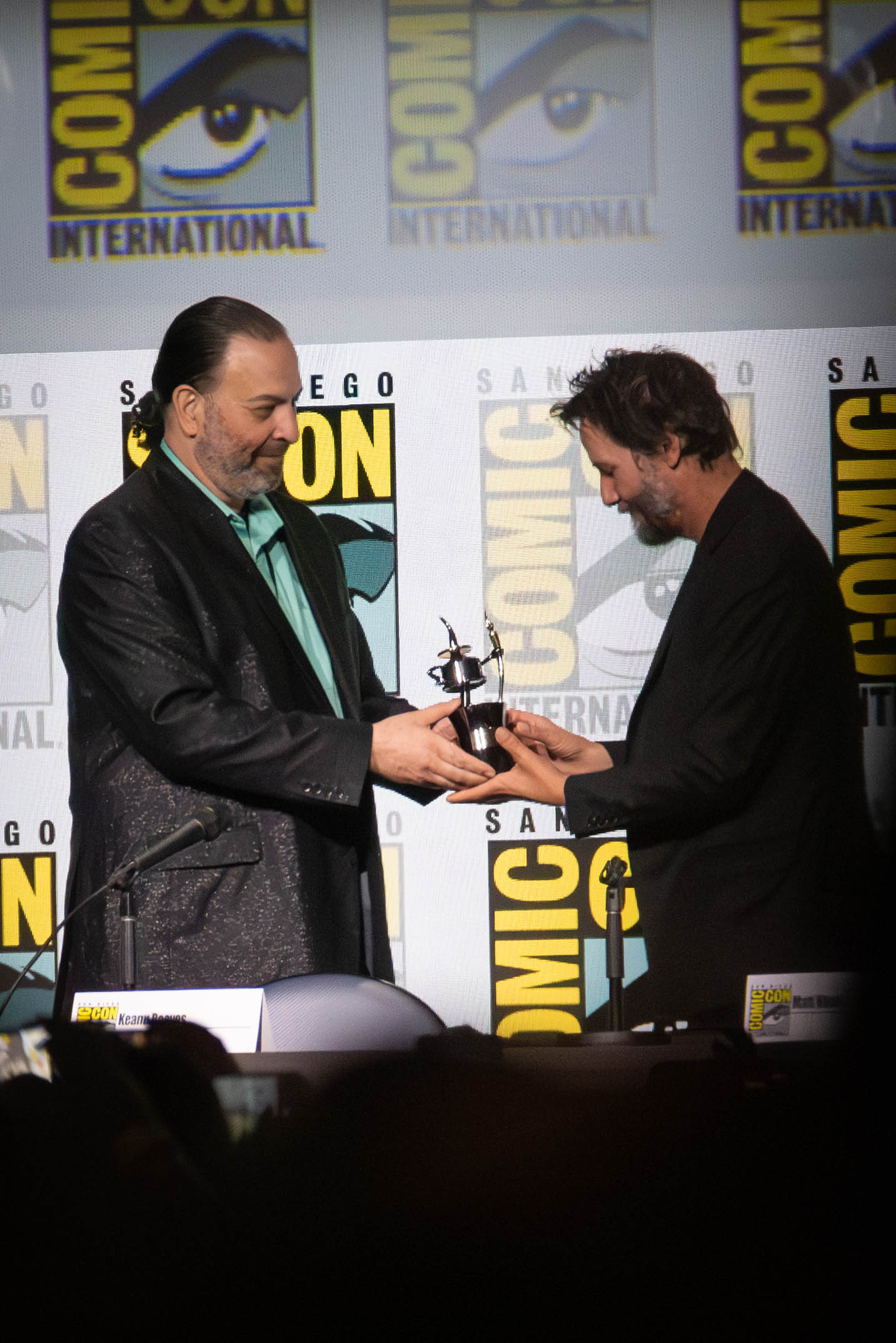
Reeves (right) receiving the Inkpot Award in 2024

Prolific in film since 1985, Reeves's most acclaimed and highest-grossing films, according to the review aggregate site Rotten Tomatoes, include: River's Edge (1987), Bill and Ted's Excellent Adventure (1989), My Own Private Idaho (1991), Much Ado About Nothing (1993), Speed (1994), The Matrix (1999), John Wick (2014), John Wick: Chapter 2 (2017), John Wick: Chapter 3 – Parabellum (2019), and Toy Story 4 (2019). Reeves has won four MTV Movie Awards, and received two Best Actor nominations at the Saturn Awards. He was nominated twice for a People's Choice Award: Favorite Male Movie Star and Favorite Action Movie Star, for his performance in John Wick: Chapter 3 – Parabellum (2019).

In November 2015, People retroactively named him 1994's Sexiest Man Alive. In September 2021, Tae Kwon Do Life Magazine deemed Reeves the "#1 Martial Arts movie star in the world" based upon his multiple films in the genre, their popularity, and sheer box office gross. In 2024, Gold House honored him on its Most Impactful Asians A100 list, and he was presented with the Inkpot Award for Lifetime Contributions to Movies, TV, Comics, and Books at San Diego Comic-Con.

== Written works ==
- Reeves, Keanu (2011). Bergam, Janey (ed.). Ode to Happiness. Alexandra Grant (drawings and book design). Göttingen: Steidl Publishers. ISBN 9783869302096. OCLC 756797130.
- Reeves, Keanu (2014). Shadows: A Collaborative Project by Alexandra Grant and Keanu Reeves. Alexandra Grant (photographs). Göttingen: Steidl Publishers. ISBN 9783869308272. OCLC 965117169.
- BRZRKR Vol. 1 (with Matt Kindt and Ron Garney, 4-issue compilation, Boom! Studios, 2021, ISBN 9781684156856)
- BRZRKR Vol. 2 (with Matt Kindt and Ron Garney, 4-issue compilation, Boom! Studios, 2022, ISBN 9781684158157)
- BRZRKR Vol. 3 (with Matt Kindt and Ron Garney, 4-issue compilation, Boom! Studios, 2023, ISBN 9781684157129)
- Reeves, Keanu; Miéville, China (2024). The Book of Elsewhere. Boom! Studios, Del Rey Books. ISBN 9780593446591.
