= List of awards and nominations received by Keanu Reeves =

Keanu Reeves awards and nominations
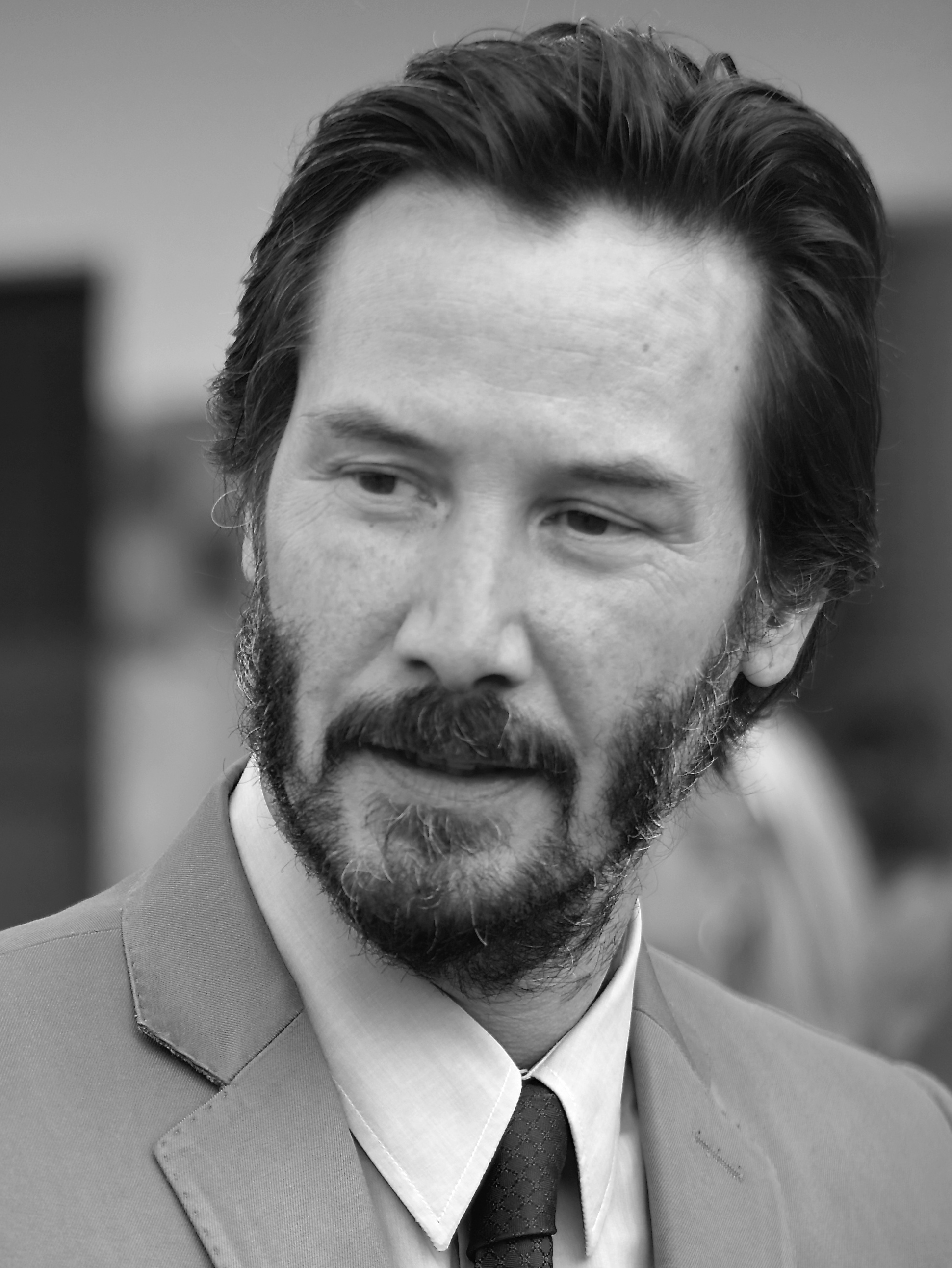
- Reeves in 2015
Awards and nominations
Award	Wins	Nominations
Nickelodeon Kids' Choice	0	3
People's Choice	0	2
Teen Choice	1	2
MTV Movie & TV Awards	4	8
Saturn Awards	1	4

Totals (Note: Certain award groups do not simply award one winner. They acknowledge several different recipients, have runners-up, and have third place. Since this is a specific recognition and is different from losing an award, runner-up mentions are considered wins in this award tally. For simplification and to avoid errors, each award in this list has been presumed to have had a prior nomination.)
- Wins: 15
- Nominations: 45

The following is a list of awards and nominations received by Canadian actor Keanu Reeves throughout his career. He earned his first award, the MTV Movie Award for Most Desirable Male, in 1992 for his performance in Point Break. Two years later, his role as the lead protagonist in Speed won him a Bravo Otto for best actor and the MTV Movie Award for Best On-Screen Duo along with Sandra Bullock. Although he was nominated for the one-off Golden Raspberry Worst of Our First 25 Years Award in 2005 for having seven previous Razzie nominations, his success in the John Wick franchise led to his nominations for the Razzie Redeemer Award in the 2015 and 2020 ceremonies.

== Awards and nominations ==
Awards and nominations received by Keanu Reeves
Award	Year (Note: Indicates the year of ceremony. Each year is linked to the article about the awards held that year, wherever possible.)	Nominated work	Category	Result	Ref.
Alliance of Women Film Journalists	2019	Siberia	Most Egregious Age Difference Between Leading Man and Love Interest (shared with Ana Ularu)	Nominated	
Bambi Awards	2008	–	Best International Actor	Won	
Blockbuster Entertainment Awards	2000	The Matrix	Favorite Actor—Science Fiction	Won	
Bravo Otto	1994	Speed	Best Actor	Won	
CinemaCon Awards	2016	–	Vanguard Award	Won	
Fangoria Chainsaw Awards	2001	The Gift	Best Supporting Actor	Nominated	
Golden Raspberry Awards	1994	Much Ado About Nothing	Worst Supporting Actor	Nominated	
Golden Raspberry Awards	1996	A Walk in the Clouds; Johnny Mnemonic	Worst Actor	Nominated	
Golden Raspberry Awards	1997	Chain Reaction	Worst Actor	Nominated	
Golden Raspberry Awards	2001	The Watcher	Worst Supporting Actor	Nominated	
Golden Raspberry Awards	2002	Hardball; Sweet November	Worst Actor	Nominated	
Golden Raspberry Awards	2005	Nominated for 7 prior Razzies without winning any	Worst of Our First 25 Years	Nominated	
Golden Raspberry Awards	2015	John Wick	Razzie Redeemer Award	Nominated	
Golden Raspberry Awards	2020	John Wick: Chapter 3 – Parabellum; Toy Story 4	Razzie Redeemer Award	Nominated	
Golden Schmoes Awards	2019	–	Favorite Celebrity of the Year	Won	
Golden Tomato Awards	2020	John Wick: Chapter 3 – Parabellum; Toy Story 4 Always Be My Maybe	Golden Year Award	Won	
Golden Tomato Awards	2020	John Wick: Chapter 3 – Parabellum; Toy Story 4 Always Be My Maybe	Fan Favorite Actors	Nominated	
Inkpot Awards	2024	–	Lifetime Contributions	Won	
MTV Movie & TV Awards	1992	Point Break	Most Desirable Male	Won	
MTV Movie & TV Awards	1995	Speed	Most Desirable Male	Nominated	
MTV Movie & TV Awards	1995	Speed	Best Male Performance	Nominated	
MTV Movie & TV Awards	1995	Speed	Best Kiss (shared with Sandra Bullock)	Nominated	
MTV Movie & TV Awards	1995	Speed	Best On-Screen Duo (shared with Sandra Bullock)	Won	
MTV Movie & TV Awards	1996	A Walk in the Clouds	Most Desirable Male	Nominated	
MTV Movie & TV Awards	1996	A Walk in the Clouds	Best Kiss (shared with Aitana Sánchez-Gijón)	Nominated	
MTV Movie & TV Awards	2000	The Matrix	Best On-Screen Duo (shared with Laurence Fishburne)	Nominated	
MTV Movie & TV Awards	2000	The Matrix	Best Fight (shared with Laurence Fishburne)	Won	
MTV Movie & TV Awards	2000	The Matrix	Best Male Performance	Won	
MTV Movie & TV Awards	2004	The Matrix Reloaded	Best Fight (shared with Hugo Weaving)	Nominated	
MTV Movie & TV Awards	2004	The Matrix Reloaded	Best Kiss (shared with Monica Bellucci)	Nominated	
MTV Movie & TV Awards	2023	John Wick: Chapter 4	Best Fight	Nominated	
MTV Movie Awards Mexico	2004	The Matrix Reloaded	Sexiest Hero (Héroe más Sexy)	Nominated	
Nickelodeon Kids' Choice Awards	1995	Speed	Favorite Movie Actor	Nominated	
Nickelodeon Kids' Choice Awards	2022	The SpongeBob Movie: Sponge on the Run	Favorite Voice from an Animated Movie	Nominated	
Nickelodeon Kids' Choice Awards	2025	Sonic The Hedgehog 3	Favorite Male Voice From An Animated Movie	Nominated	
People's Choice Awards	2019	John Wick: Chapter 3 – Parabellum	Male Movie Star of the Year	Nominated	
People's Choice Awards	2019	John Wick: Chapter 3 – Parabellum	Action Movie Star of the Year	Nominated	
People's Choice Awards	2020	Bill & Ted Face the Music	Comedy Movie Star of the Year	Nominated	
Saturn Awards	2000	The Matrix	Best Actor	Nominated	
Saturn Awards	2019	John Wick: Chapter 3 – Parabellum	Best Actor	Nominated	
Saturn Awards	2024	John Wick: Chapter 4	Best Actor	Nominated	
Saturn Awards	2024	–	Lance Reddick Legacy Award	Won	
Taurus World Stunt Awards	2004	The Matrix Reloaded	Action Movie Star of the Year	Won	
Teen Choice Awards	2003	The Matrix Reloaded	Choice Movie Actor - Drama/Action Adventure	Nominated	
Teen Choice Awards	2004	The Matrix Revolutions	Choice Movie Actor - Drama/Action Adventure	Nominated	
Teen Choice Awards	2006	The Lake House	Choice Liplock (shared with Sandra Bullock)	Won	
