= The Great Warming =

2006 American climate change film

- DVD cover
- Directed by: Michael Taylor
- Narrated by: Alanis Morissette; Keanu Reeves
- Release dates: March 6, 2006 (Portland); November 9, 2006 (United States)
- Running time: 85 minutes
- Countries: United States; Canada
- Language: English

The Great Warming is a 2006 documentary film directed by Michael Taylor. The film was hosted by Alanis Morissette and Keanu Reeves, which showed an alliance between Democrats and Evangelicals trying to influence the administration out of its lack of action on climate change mitigation. The documentary is a shortened, American-focused version of a three-part Canadian TV series from 2003.

Regal Cinemas initially released the film in 34 markets on November 3, 2006 and released in major U.S. cities on November 9, 2006. A special program was developed for faith communities, and the film was distributed to over 500 churches, synagogs, and mosques across the US.

== Summary ==
Featuring elements of the 2005 Public Broadcasting Service special Global Warming: the Signs and the Science, The Great Warming (produced by the same team) talks to key researchers and reports on social justice and day-to-day impacts as well as emission statistics. It is also populated with everyday people from all over the United States and the planet who are feeling the brunt of global warming, and/or finding innovative ways to tackle it.

== Reception ==
A review in Newsweek criticized the film by saying "The Great Warming shows exactly what's wrong with turning complex issues over to Hollywood: it's manipulative (it travels to Peru to report on the death of two boys from cholera contracted during a flood — implying a causal connection that serious scientists invariably warn against) and muddled in its use of scientific terms."

Variety said "Different countries and individual citizens are visited in intimate vignettes, but this personal approach seems inimical to any overarching sense of urgency and cohesion."

== See also ==
- Politics of global warming (United States)
- Evangelical environmentalism
- An Inconvenient Truth
