= Development of the DC Extended Universe =

DC logo used from 2016 to 2024

From 2013 until 2023, the DC Extended Universe (DCEU) media franchise experienced a turbulent history behind the scenes, characterized by highly publicized clashes between studio executives and talent, constantly changing approaches to worldbuilding, and repeated changes in management. Warner Bros. Pictures originally announced plans for a shared universe of live-action films based on the DC Comics, starting with the release of Man of Steel (2013), with director Zack Snyder set to spearhead the franchise. Following the negative reception to Snyder's follow-up film Batman v Superman: Dawn of Justice (2016), Warner Bros. created DC Films, a new division led by Geoff Johns and Jon Berg tasked with overseeing development of the DCEU. DC Films attempted to course-correct the franchise's direction, culminating in the troubled production and release of the crossover film Justice League (2017).

After the failure of Justice League, Warner Bros. sought to de-emphasize the DCEU's interconnectivity and transition from the Snyder era, releasing a series of solo films while greenlighting live-action films not set in the DCEU. Walter Hamada was appointed the new head of DC Films, replacing Johns and Berg; under his leadership, the studio severed ties with several of its leading talent, including Snyder, Superman actor Henry Cavill, and Batman actor Ben Affleck. The DCEU also expanded to live-action television with HBO Max's Peacemaker (2022–present), helmed by The Suicide Squad (2021) director James Gunn.

In 2022, WarnerMedia completed its merger with Discovery to form Warner Bros. Discovery, led by CEO David Zaslav, whose aspirations for the DCEU differed from those of Hamada, leading to his cancellation of Batgirl (2022) and the subsequent ousting of Hamada. After a months-long search for a replacement, Zaslav selected Gunn and Peter Safran to co-lead DC Studios, the successor to DC Films. Under their leadership, DC Studios launched a new media franchise and shared franchise, known as the "DC Universe" (DCU), which served as a soft reboot of the DCEU. The final DCEU film, Aquaman and the Lost Kingdom (2023), capped off a string of poorly received DCEU films in its final year, and was succeeded by the first round of DCU projects in 2024. Gunn and Safran would themselves be ousted in 2026, when DC fell under the ownership of David Ellison's newly formed conglomerate Skydance, with Jeremy Latcham tapped to replace them.

== Background ==
The first feature film based on a character from American comic books published by DC Comics was Superman and the Mole Men (1951), a B-movie distributed by Lippert Pictures and starring George Reeves as Clark Kent / Superman, which served as a backdoor pilot to the Adventures of Superman (1952–1958) television series. In 1967, DC Comics predecessor National Periodical Publications was acquired by Kinney National Company, later known as Warner Communications, Time Warner, and WarnerMedia. Since then, nearly all DC films have been distributed by Warner Bros. Pictures, the flagship film studio of the Warner conglomerate.

In the early 2000s, Warner Bros. was looking to relaunch its Batman and Superman film franchises following the disappointing performances of Batman & Robin (1997) and Superman IV: The Quest for Peace (1987), both critically and commercially. The studio briefly entertained the idea of a "Batman vs. Superman" crossover film directed by Wolfgang Petersen from a script by Akiva Goldsman, but these plans never came to fruition and the film was sent to development hell. The studio instead opted to greenlight Batman Begins (2005) and Superman Returns (2006), standalone stories featuring the two characters that the studio hoped would eventually lead to a Batman–Superman crossover. Batman Begins was a critical and commercial success, leading to two sequels that constituted The Dark Knight trilogy: The Dark Knight (2008) and The Dark Knight Rises (2012). By contrast, Superman Returns underperformed at the box office, causing the studio to cancel plans for a 2009 sequel.

In 2007, Warner Bros. hired Michele and Kieran Mulroney to pen a screenplay for a film featuring the Justice League of America (JLA). Christian Bale, who starred as Bruce Wayne / Batman in The Dark Knight trilogy, was not approached to reprise the role, nor was Brandon Routh, who starred as Superman in Superman Returns. George Miller signed on to direct the film, reportedly titled Justice League Mortal, with the ensemble cast consisting of Armie Hammer as Batman, D. J. Cotrona as Superman, Adam Brody as Barry Allen / Flash, Santiago Cabrera as Arthur Curry / Aquaman, Common as John Stewart / Green Lantern, Megan Gale as Diana Prince / Wonder Woman, Hugh Keays-Byrne as J'onn J'onzz / Martian Manhunter, and Jay Baruchel as Maxwell Lord. The project was abandoned within a year because the studio failed to secure tax breaks for filming in Australia and the 2007–2008 Writers Guild of America strike hindered progress on the script. It had been intended to launch a full-fledged franchise, with sequels and spin-offs planned.

== 2008–2016: Zack Snyder ==
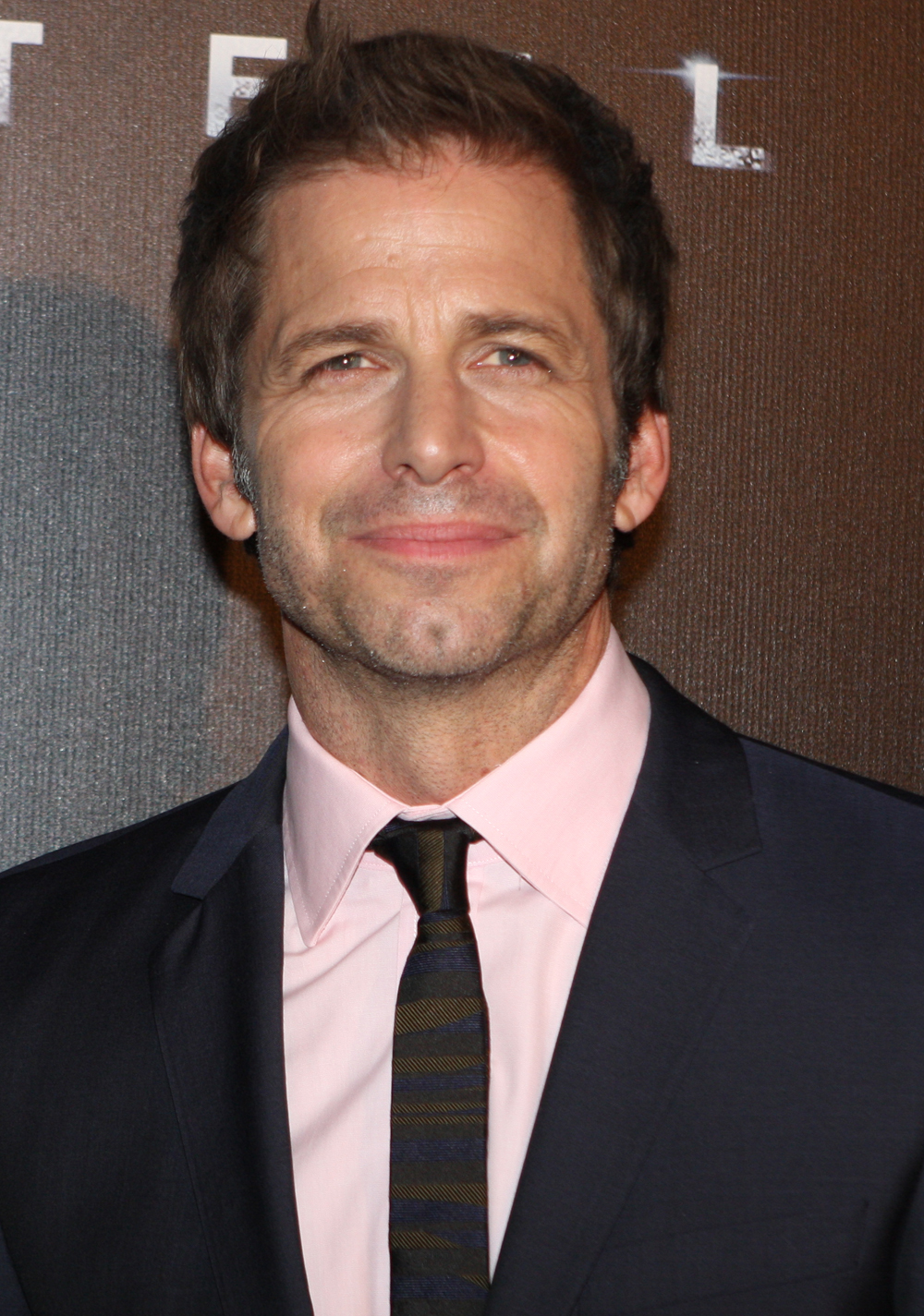
Zack Snyder, director of Man of Steel (2013), Batman v Superman: Dawn of Justice (2016), and Justice League (2017)

By June 2008, Warner Bros. had restarted plans for a Superman reboot, hearing pitches from comic-book writers such as Grant Morrison, Mark Waid, Geoff Johns, Brad Meltzer, and Mark Millar. While discussing the story of The Dark Knight Rises with director Christopher Nolan, screenwriter David S. Goyer shared with him an idea of a Superman film set in a modern context, which Nolan was impressed by and pitched to the studio. On the heels of The Dark Knight's critical acclaim and financial success, Warner Bros. quickly hired Goyer to write the film and Nolan to produce. By then, the Batman–Superman team-up film was no longer in development.

In October 2010, Zack Snyder was chosen to direct the Superman reboot. Henry Cavill was announced to star as Superman in January 2011, and the film was released in 2013 under the title Man of Steel. It was to lay the groundwork for future DC films, containing numerous Easter eggs and references to other DC characters, with the intention of setting up a shared universe of DC characters in film akin to the DC Universe in the comics. Snyder and Nolan considered having Man of Steel share continuity with The Dark Knight trilogy, but ultimately decided against it. The film Green Lantern (2011), starring Ryan Reynolds as Hal Jordan / Green Lantern, was originally meant to kickstart the shared universe, but those plans were discarded following the film's critical and commercial failure. Meanwhile, despite a mixed critical reception, Man of Steel was a financial success, and Warner Bros. unveiled plans for a follow-up film featuring Batman and Superman at San Diego Comic-Con (SDCC) in July 2013, one month after the film's release, titled Batman v Superman: Dawn of Justice.

The studio soon resumed work on a Justice League film as work on adaptations of the Flash and Wonder Woman stalled, with Will Beall attached as screenwriter. Goyer came in to replace Beall in June 2013, before being replaced himself by Chris Terrio the next year, and Snyder was locked in to direct in April 2014. Casting for the other Justice League members took place throughout 2013–2015, with Ben Affleck set to play Batman, Gal Gadot set to play Wonder Woman, Jason Momoa set to play Aquaman, Ezra Miller set to play the Flash, and Ray Fisher set to play Victor Stone / Cyborg.

Warner Bros. was keen on emulating the success of the Marvel Cinematic Universe (MCU), a nascent media franchise based on characters published by DC archrival Marvel Comics. In October 2014, the studio announced a slate of 11 films set in their shared DC universe: Suicide Squad, Wonder Woman, Justice League Part One, The Flash, Aquaman, Shazam!, Justice League Part Two, Cyborg, Green Lantern Corps, a sequel to Man of Steel, and a Batman film. Snyder, the de facto head of the franchise, was to direct both Justice League crossovers, with Part One later shortened to simply Justice League. The Flash and Cyborg both suffered multiple delays, with the former eventually securing a 2023 release date. The franchise, which had no official name, was humorously dubbed the "DC Extended Universe" (DCEU) by Entertainment Weekly reporter Keith Staskiewicz in July 2015, and this became widely used to refer to DC's live-action shared universe under the erroneous assumption that the name was legitimate; Warner Bros. began using the term officially in 2020.

== 2016–2017: Geoff Johns and Jon Berg ==
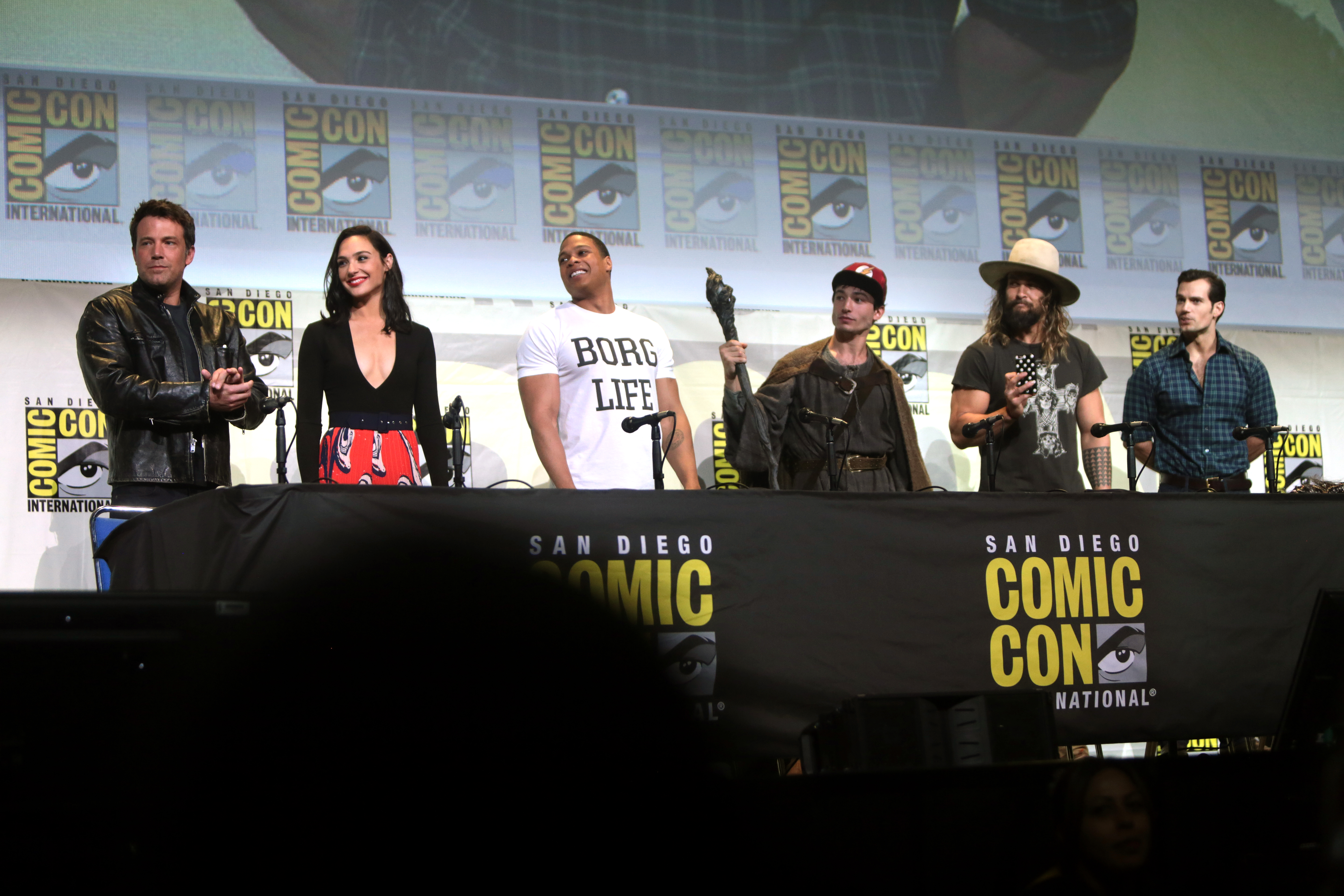
The cast of Justice League (2017) at the 2016 San Diego Comic-Con (L to R): Ben Affleck, Gal Gadot, Ray Fisher, Ezra Miller, Jason Momoa, and Henry Cavill

Despite strong opening-weekend numbers, Batman v Superman was lambasted by critics upon its release in 2016 and performed below expectations. In response, Warner Bros. established DC Films to consolidate oversight of the franchise, not dissimilar to the Marvel Studios division led by Kevin Feige, the studio behind the MCU. Johns, who was now DC's chief creative officer, and Warner Bros. executive vice president Jon Berg were appointed to co-lead the new division. DC Films would not be fully autonomous, as Johns reported to DC Entertainment president Diane Nelson and Berg reported to Warner Bros. president of creative development Greg Silverman. Charles Roven, who had produced every DC film since Batman Begins, was relegated to the administrative position of executive producer. Silverman exited the company in December, with Toby Emmerich promoted to president and chief content officer in his place; by January 2017, Johns and Berg both reported to Emmerich.

Hoping to avert another Batman v Superman–esque disaster, DC Films made swift attempts to course-correct the DCEU, with the goal of setting a more light-hearted tone. Director David Ayer was ordered to perform extensive reshoots and re-editing for Suicide Squad based on rewritten material from Johns, resulting in a theatrical cut that vastly differed from Ayer's original vision. Warner Bros. was similarly unhappy with Justice League despite Snyder's considerable efforts to lighten its tone, and Warner Bros. Entertainment CEO Kevin Tsujihara dispatched Johns and Berg to "babysit" Snyder. Joss Whedon, who previously directed the MCU crossover films Marvel's The Avengers (2012) and Avengers: Age of Ultron (2015), was brought in by Johns to assist in rewrites and reshoots, but his power grew exponentially and Snyder eventually "lost the will to fight" during deliberations over the script. Johns also performed a rewrite of Wonder Woman with director Patty Jenkins, changing that film's ending over her objections.

In May 2017, Snyder stepped down from directorial duties on Justice League to cope with his daughter Autumn's suicide, and Whedon assumed command to oversee post-production and complete the film. Whedon made significant alterations to Snyder's nearly finished cut, reshooting much of the film with 80 pages of new material while deleting a large number of sequences that had already been filmed. These efforts failed to produce Warner Bros.' desired effect, with Suicide Squad and Justice League both panned by critics. While Suicide Squad was a box-office success, Justice League became a box-office bomb and lost the studio an estimated $60 million; Wonder Woman was released several months prior to Justice League to critical and commercial success. By the end of the year, development on the Man of Steel sequel was in limbo.

== 2018–2022: Walter Hamada ==
=== Justice League fallout ===
In the aftermath of Justice League, Berg departed DC Films and was replaced by Walter Hamada in January 2018. Chantal Nong was also appointed vice president of DC Films. Warner Bros. executives approached Feige at this time to have him lead development of the DCEU, but these talks "fizzled". Johns stepped down from his position in June, leaving Hamada solely in command. The studio now sought to de-emphasize the DCEU's shared nature, with Nelson and Tsujihara stating that future DCEU films would concentrate on individual character stories rather than maintaining a sense of interconnectivity. As such, Justice League Part Two was delayed indefinitely. Under Hamada's leadership, the studio severed ties with Snyder, whose original plans had encompassed a five-film arc that began with Man of Steel and concluded with an adaptation of the Flashpoint (2011) crossover story arc, the latter of which would have rebooted the DCEU.

Affleck had signed on to direct his solo Batman film, titled The Batman, in April 2016, but he resigned in January 2017 and was replaced by Matt Reeves. The actor departed from the film outright in January 2019, allowing Reeves to remove the film's connections to the DCEU; The Batman (2022) ultimately served as a reboot of the Batman film series, starring Robert Pattinson in the titular role and launching its own franchise. Affleck attributed his decision to retire to his negative experience shooting Justice League, adding that his friend and fellow actor Matt Damon was a "principal influence in that decision". In August 2020, he was confirmed to reprise his role as Batman for a final time in The Flash in a limited capacity, with Michael Keaton also set to return as his version of the character from the 1989–1997 Batman films. After The Flash, Keaton was scheduled to return in Batgirl and another film based on the animated television series Batman Beyond (1999–2001).

Immediately after the release of Justice League, fans of Snyder began calling for Warner Bros. to release his original cut prior to Whedon's contributions, dubbed the "Snyder Cut". These calls ballooned into a years-long campaign with the hashtag #ReleaseTheSnyderCut, gaining the support of key Justice League cast members, though industry experts believed it unlikely for Warner Bros. to release said cut. In July 2020, Fisher accused Whedon of abusive behavior on set during his reshoots for Justice League, claims that were corroborated by Gadot and Momoa. Criticizing Hamada for allegedly harboring Whedon, Fisher declared he would not return as Cyborg unless Hamada stepped down, resulting in the Cyborg film and Fisher's planned appearance in The Flash being shelved.

In September 2018, Cavill was reported to have parted ways with Warner Bros., and Emmerich commissioned a search for a new actor to portray Superman. Superman proceeded to make a headless cameo in Shazam! via a body double. Development on the Man of Steel sequel had stagnated by May 2020, though Cavill was said to have engaged in talks to return as his character in future DCEU projects. In February 2021, Ta-Nehisi Coates was revealed to be writing a new Superman film set in the DCEU and produced by J. J. Abrams, expected to cast a Black actor as Superman. Similar to The Batman, the film's connections to the DCEU were later dropped, placing it in a separate continuity.

=== New ventures ===
In October 2018, James Gunn was hired to direct a standalone sequel to Suicide Squad, later titled The Suicide Squad (2021). This came after Gunn's dismissal from his role as director of the MCU film Guardians of the Galaxy Vol. 3 (2023), amid the resurfacing of offensive remarks made by him on Twitter years prior. Aquaman and Shazam! both enjoyed successes critically and commercially, while Suicide Squad spin-off Birds of Prey (2020), Wonder Woman sequel Wonder Woman 1984 (2020), and The Suicide Squad all underperformed at the box office, in part due to the COVID-19 pandemic. Green Lantern Corps, which had been languishing in development hell, was no longer in active development by 2019. The DCEU expanded to television in 2022 with HBO Max's Peacemaker (2022–2025), a spin-off to The Suicide Squad helmed by Gunn which garnered favorable reviews from critics. The Justice League makes a cameo appearance in the first-season finale, "It's Cow or Never", with Miller and Momoa reprising their roles, Superman and Wonder Woman appearing via silhouette, and Batman and Cyborg absent per Warner Bros.' request.

In May 2020, WarnerMedia announced that a director's cut of Justice League, titled Zack Snyder's Justice League (2021), would be released on its recently launched HBO Max streaming service, with several actors returning for additional photography to finish the film. Zack Snyder's Justice League, which is four hours long and not canon to the DCEU, received mixed reviews from critics, who generally viewed it as superior to Whedon's theatrical cut. Emboldened by their campaign's success, Snyder's fans now urged Warner Bros. to restore Snyder's original vision for the DCEU, employing the hashtag #RestoreTheSnyderVerse, and release Ayer's original cut of Suicide Squad prior to Johns' contributions, employing the hashtag #ReleaseTheAyerCut.

By 2021, Warner Bros. had once again shifted their stance on interconnectivity, with Warner Bros. Entertainment CEO Ann Sarnoff now stating that future DCEU projects would be "more connected". Hamada said that DC Films was interested in developing spin-off series to DCEU films on HBO Max, and the platform began planning multiple series featuring Justice League Dark members in collaboration with Abrams, with the goal of eventually culminating these projects in a crossover miniseries. In addition to The Batman, Hamada also greenlit Joker (2019), directed by Todd Phillips and starring Joaquin Phoenix as Arthur Fleck / Joker, which is not set in the DCEU. The film went on to receive critical acclaim, becoming a box-office success and leading to a sequel, Joker: Folie à Deux (2024).

=== Warner Bros. Discovery ===
In April 2022, Discovery, Inc. completed its acquisition of WarnerMedia from AT&T, forming Warner Bros. Discovery (WBD). Former Discovery CEO David Zaslav became president and CEO of the new company, and he immediately began searching for a "creative and strategic czar" akin to Feige to establish a "coherent creative and brand strategy" at DC. Zaslav desired to prioritize theatrical releases over direct-to-streaming content, and a planned HBO Max film centered around the Wonder Twins was no longer move forward by May due to Zaslav's concerns over its costly production budget. In June, Michael De Luca and Pamela Abdy were selected as interim co-CEOs and co-chairpersons of Warner Bros. Pictures, succeeding Emmerich. The same month, The Flash was expected to be Miller's last DCEU appearance, following a string of controversial incidents and arrests involving them amidst a mental health crisis, while Amber Heard, who portrayed Mera in Aquaman and Justice League, found herself embroiled in controversy in the aftermath of a highly publicized defamation lawsuit against her ex-husband, actor Johnny Depp. An online petition to have Heard removed from Aquaman sequel Aquaman and the Lost Kingdom (2023) received over 4 million signatures, but Hamada and producer Peter Safran vehemently denied claims that her role had been reduced. Variety later stated that Heard had been "nearly fired" from the film due to chemistry issues with Momoa, but that these plans were scrapped after Heard's ex-boyfriend, billionaire business magnate Elon Musk, intervened.

In July, rumors circulated that Cavill would make an appearance at SDCC 2022 to announce his return as Superman in Black Adam (2022), a spin-off to Shazam! which Dwayne Johnson had been attached to star and produce since 2014. When this did not happen, Johnson was booed onstage by panel attendees. After this episode, Johnson approached Hamada and requested his permission to film a Superman cameo with Cavill. Hamada refused, citing Coates and Abrams' film, and Johnson turned to De Luca and Abdy, who overruled Hamada. A sequel to Man of Steel re-entered development, with Roven set to produce. Cavill, who had previously expressed his desire to return as Superman, filmed cameos for Black Adam and The Flash shortly thereafter, with the latter intended be part of De Luca and Abdy's newly conceived ending of the film in which Cavill is joined by Gadot's Wonder Woman, Keaton's Batman, and Sasha Calle's Kara Zor-El / Supergirl. This was to drum up excitement for Cavill's Man of Steel sequel and a third Wonder Woman film which was in development from Jenkins and Gadot. Meanwhile, Affleck returned to film a cameo as Batman for Aquaman and the Lost Kingdom, replacing a planned appearance by Keaton due to the film being moved to before The Flash.

In August, Zaslav made the unprecedented decision to cancel Batgirl, which had just concluded principal photography and been scheduled for an HBO Max release. According to TheWrap, the move stemmed from Zaslav's dissatisfaction with the film's quality, but Variety, The Hollywood Reporter, and Deadline Hollywood maintained that the cancellation was part of the studio's cost-cutting measures. Hamada, who was not consulted, was upset by the news and considered resigning, but agreed to remain on until Black Adam's release. He had plans for a crossover event based on the comic book storyline "Crisis on Infinite Earths" (1985). Executives also canceled plans for a film centered on Supergirl. During WBD's quarterly earnings investor call two days after Batgirl's cancellation, Zaslav described his goal to "reset" DC and develop a ten-year plan for the DCEU, mentioning Feige and Marvel Studios as his blueprint. Batman, Superman, and Wonder Woman were named as the key players of his vision.

As Hamada prepared for his exit, Zaslav began searching for a successor, with Dan Lin said to be among those in contention. Johnson took on an advisory role for the DCEU, expressing confidence in the future of the franchise under the direction of Zaslav, De Luca, and Abdy. Johnson was ecstatic about his future in the DCEU and framed Black Adam as the cornerstone of a new chapter in the franchise, frequently teasing a showdown between Teth-Adam / Black Adam and Cavill's Superman. Johnson pitched a "multiyear plan" involving the two characters to Zaslav, but his relationship with the studio gradually deteriorated due to executives' reluctance to meet Johnson's demands. Despite Cavill's appearance in Black Adam's mid-credits scene drawing a positive response from some audiences, the film was poorly received and became a box-office bomb, and a sequel was reported to be unlikely.

== 2022–2023: James Gunn and Peter Safran ==
=== Immediate effects ===
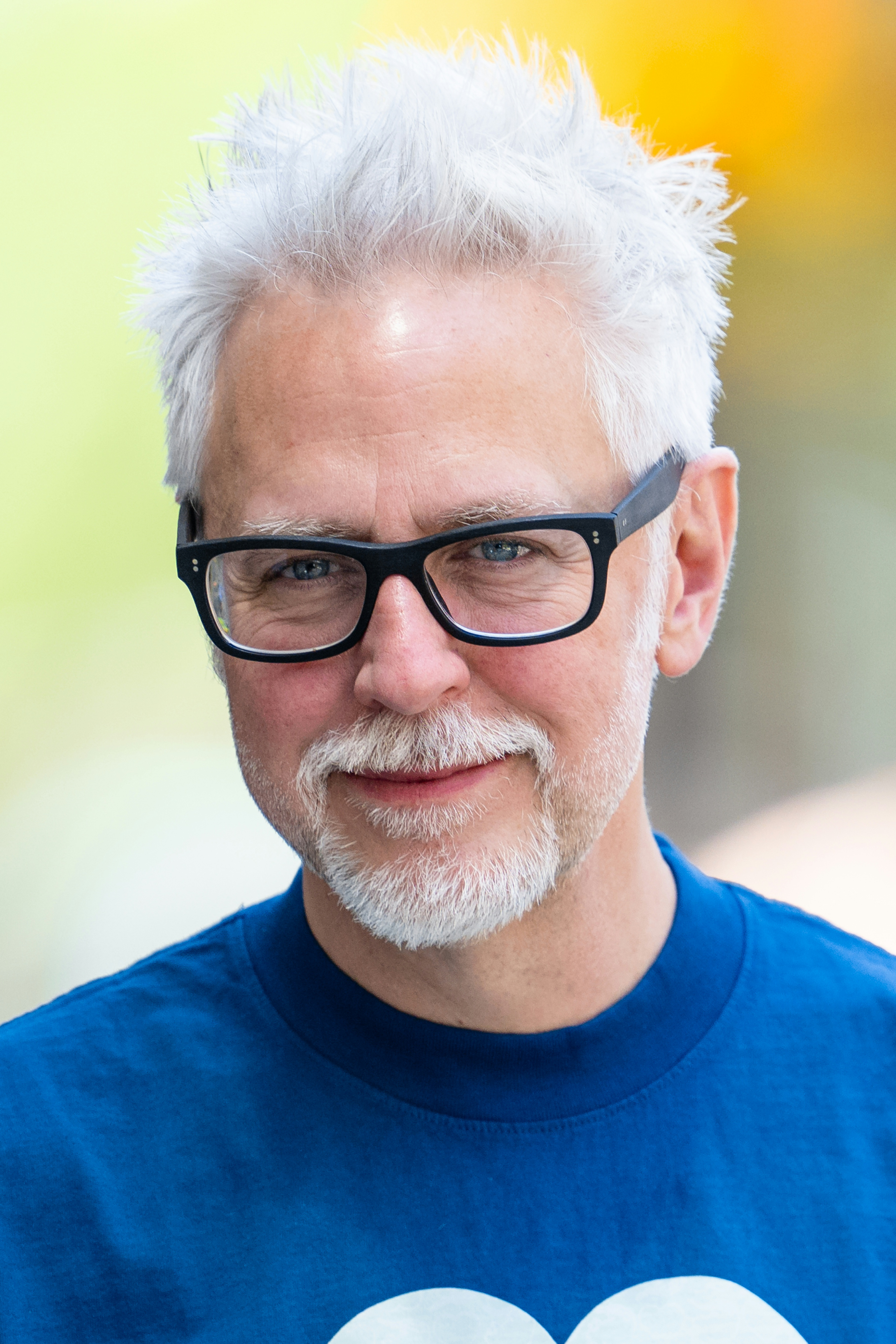
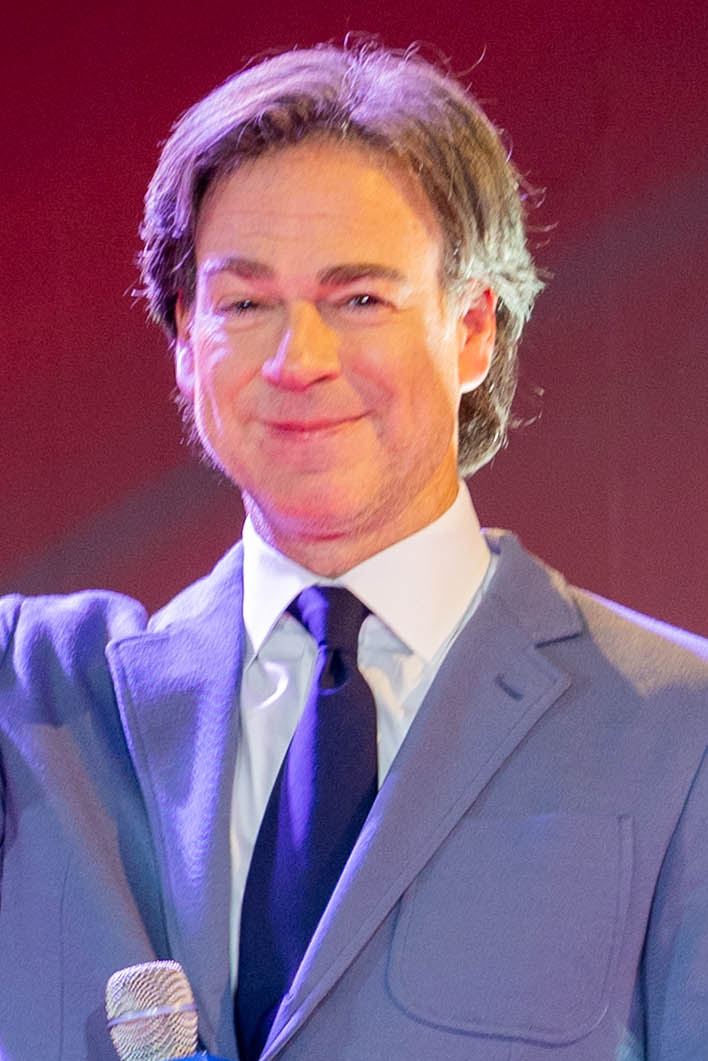
Filmmaker James Gunn and producer Peter Safran, the co-chairs and co-CEOs of DC Studios since November 2022

In October 2022, Gunn and Safran were hired as the co-CEOs of DC Studios, the successor to DC Films, effective November 1. The duo had been recommended to Zaslav by De Luca. Gunn and Safran signaled their intention to overhaul DC's film and television properties, with Zaslav indicating that DC's various media offerings across film, television, animation, video games, and other mediums would be united into one franchise. Gunn further stated that he and Safran would have an open mind to input from fans, condemned the vitriol directed to him by discontent DCEU fans, and promised that they would receive no studio interference unlike their predecessors. He has cited the animated series Justice League Unlimited (2004–2006) and Young Justice (2010–2022) as inspirations for his and Safran's slate of projects. The duo spent the remaining year finalizing their plans for the DCEU, which spanned eight to ten years, presenting them to Zaslav in December.

Upon taking the reins of the DCEU, Gunn and Safran decided to abandon the previous regimes' plans for the franchise's future. Work on the third Wonder Woman film was halted, while Cavill backtracked his previous announcement that he was returning as Superman, which had been made in coordination with De Luca and Abdy. Instead, Gunn revealed that he was writing a new Superman film centered on a younger version of the character, and the role would be recast. The Man of Steel sequel was once again shelved. Johnson confirmed that Black Adam was not part of Gunn and Safran's immediate plans, and Keaton's Batman Beyond film was scrapped. The Hollywood Reporter indicated that DC Studios was also considering ending Momoa's run as Aquaman, with the potential of recasting him in a different role.

Because of these changes, Gunn and Safran found the new Flash ending problematic, and thus removed Cavill, Gadot, Keaton, and Calle from the ending in favor of a cameo from Batman & Robin star George Clooney. For the same reason, Gunn and Safran also removed both Keaton and Affleck from Aquaman and the Lost Kingdom, following a third round of reshoots. Cavill's role in the Flash was reduced to a brief cameo being made with the use of CGI and his likeness. Momoa stated that he would continue to play Aquaman, but hinted at the possibility of him taking on other roles simultaneously. Actor Dave Bautista, who worked with Gunn on the Guardians films, said that Gunn and Safran intended to reboot the DCEU. Variety reported that Gunn and Safran's new universe would be a "broad but not blanket reset" for the franchise.

=== DC Universe ===
In January 2023, Gunn and Safran announced their slate of ten DC adaptations, which included: the animated series Creature Commandos; the series Waller, which serves as a spinoff to Peacemaker; the film Superman: Legacy (2025), Gunn's Superman film (later retitled to simply Superman); the series Lanterns, unrelated to Greg Berlanti's Green Lantern project that was previously in development; the film The Authority; the series Paradise Lost, which explores the island of Themyscira before the birth of Wonder Woman; the film The Brave and the Bold, featuring a new Batman; the series Booster Gold; the film Supergirl; and the film Swamp Thing. These projects were to be part of the DC Universe (DCU), a new franchise which serves as the spiritual successor to the DCEU. Gunn further revealed that The Flash would "reset" the DCEU's continuity, essentially serving as a soft reboot. Any projects produced by DC Studios that were not set in the DCEU or DCU, including the Joker and The Batman films, would henceforth be labeled as "DC Elseworlds" properties.

Shazam! sequel Shazam! Fury of the Gods (2023), The Flash, Blue Beetle (2023), and Aquaman and the Lost Kingdom were released as the final four DCEU films, segueing into Gunn and Safran's slate. Fury of the Gods was originally positioned as the DCEU's third course correction. Gunn stated that while neither Affleck's Batman nor Cavill's Superman would be a part of the DCU, he and Safran had offered to allow Gadot, Momoa, Miller, and Billy Batson / Shazam actor Zachary Levi to continue playing their DCEU characters. David F. Sandberg, the director of the Shazam! films, said he was told that his films did not contradict Gunn and Safran's plans and the character's future would thus depend on the film's attendance; following Fury of the Gods's failure at the box office, Levi cast doubt on his return. Meanwhile, Gadot told reporters that Gunn and Safran had personally assured her that the third Wonder Woman film would move forward; Collider and Variety both refuted her claims, affirming that no Wonder Woman project besides Paradise Lost was in development at DC Studios. A Variety report in October 2023 stated that no actors from Snyder's DCEU films would reprise their roles in the DCU. The same applied to Calle, who originally signed on a multi-film contract to reprise her role as Supergirl from The Flash before Warner "frustratingly" changed that film's ending.

Jennifer Holland and Steve Agee reprise their DCEU roles as Emilia Harcourt and John Economos, respectively, in Fury of the Gods' mid-credits scene, in which they attempt to recruit Batson into Black Adam's Justice Society of America (JSA). This had been intended as the post-credits scene of Black Adam, and originally featured members of the JSA, but Johnson "vetoed" both ideas, forcing Safran to bring in Holland and Agee. Gadot cameos in Fury of the Gods and The Flash, while Johnson declined cameos in both. The Flash acknowledges the events of Zack Snyder's Justice League, despite Warner Bros.' previous statements regarding the film's canonicity. In April 2023, Deadline stated that the titular character in Blue Beetle would likely return in the DCU, while Gunn called him "the first DCU character".

As the DCEU neared the end of its decade-long run, it continued to struggle financially. The final four DCEU films all failed at the box office, which analysts attributed to a variety of compounding factors, including subdued marketing efforts due to WBD's financial woes, Miller's situation, and two concurrent strikes in Hollywood; poor word-of-mouth driven by the films' lackluster critical reception; and a tepid audience awaiting the arrival of Gunn and Safran's DCU slate. Additionally, years of behind-the-scenes drama had created a sharply divided fanbase, including Snyder zealots who maintained a large presence online, those optimistic about the DCU in Gunn and Safran's hands, and those who have moved on from the DCEU and comic-book films in general. The Hollywood Reporter summarized the toxic discourse surrounding the DCEU as "a war of personal attacks, vendettas, cult mentalities, antagonistic journalism, and career-altering decisions".

== See also ==
- List of films based on DC Comics publications
- List of television series based on DC Comics publications
