= Production of The Batman (film) =

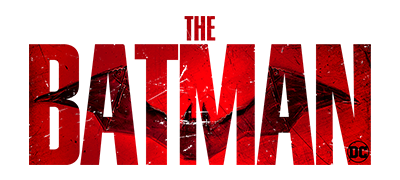

The 2022 superhero film The Batman, based on the DC Comics character Batman, had a long production that was characterized by changes in the creative direction of the project, co-writer and director Matt Reeves's meticulous filmmaking process, and various production delays that were largely caused by effects of the COVID-19 pandemic on the cast and crew members.

Warner Bros. Pictures announced initial plans for a reboot of the Batman film series in October 2014 with a new film that was originally conceived as part of its media franchise and shared universe of DC-based properties, the DC Extended Universe (DCEU). Ben Affleck, who was cast to portray the DCEU version of the character in 2013, was originally hired to star in and direct the film in 2015 before he stepped down as writer and director in January 2017 due to personal issues, in part caused by the troubled production of the DCEU film Justice League (2017). Warner Bros. subsequently hired Reeves to take over the project in February 2017, and he underwent a meticulous writing process during which he chose to focus on a version of Batman younger than Affleck's portrayal and separated the film from the DCEU continuity to tell a standalone story. Robert Pattinson was cast as Batman in May 2019, and filming began in January 2020, but was suspended several times due to the onset of the COVID-19 pandemic. Filming was completed in March 2021, and The Batman was theatrically released a year later.

== Development ==
=== Early work and initial plans from Ben Affleck ===
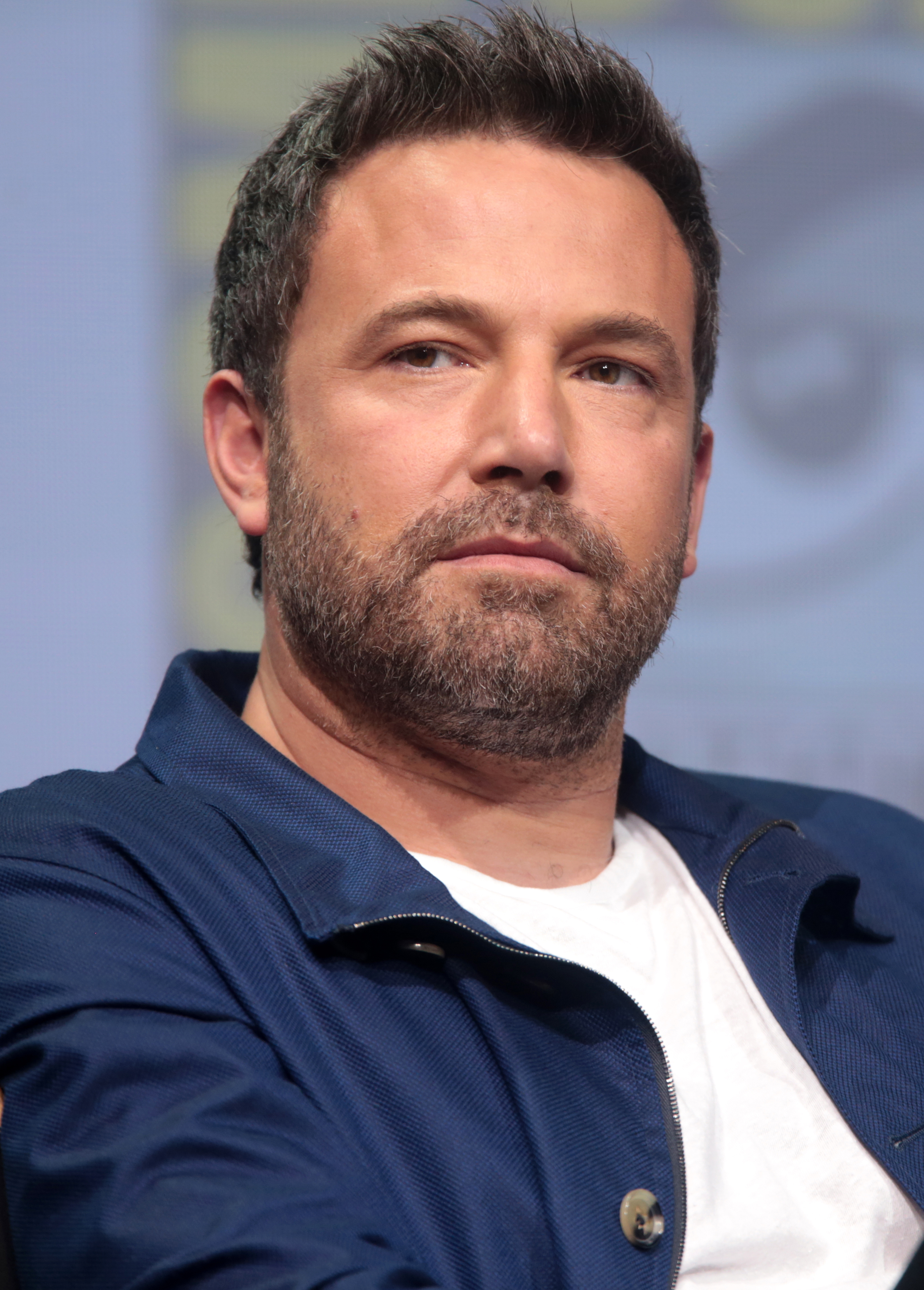
Ben Affleck was initially set to star in and develop The Batman before exiting due to several factors.

Ben Affleck was cast in August 2013 to portray the DC Comics character Bruce Wayne / Batman in multiple films set in the DC Extended Universe (DCEU) media franchise. He made his debut in Batman v Superman: Dawn of Justice (2016), before appearing in Suicide Squad (2016) and Justice League (2017). In October 2014, Warner Bros. Pictures revealed plans for a standalone Batman film starring Affleck, and he was in negotiations to direct and co-write the screenplay with Geoff Johns by July 2015. Production was expected to begin after Affleck finished work on Live by Night (2016). Affleck and Johns finished the first draft in March 2016. Set after the events of Batman v Superman and Justice League, the script told an original story inspired by comic book elements, an approach that Affleck compared to director Zack Snyder's Batman v Superman story, with specific influence from Arkham Asylum: A Serious House on Serious Earth (1989) and "Knightfall" (1992–1994) as well as the video game Batman: Arkham Asylum (2009). Cinematographer Robert Richardson, who was attached early in development, confirmed that the script was primarily set in Arkham Asylum. It featured Slade Wilson / Deathstroke orchestrating a breakout at Arkham to tire Batman and make him vulnerable, before fighting him in the streets of Gotham City during the climax. Batgirl was planned to appear and help Batman. Johns said the film would also explore the death of Robin, which was hinted at in Batman v Superman.

Warner Bros. CEO Kevin Tsujihara confirmed at CinemaCon in April 2016 that Affleck would direct the Batman film. Jeremy Irons said he would reprise his Batman v Superman role of Alfred Pennyworth in May, and Joe Manganiello was cast as Deathstroke in September. Manganiello explained that Deathstroke believed Batman was responsible for his son's death and was depicted as systematically dismantling Batman's life and killing those close to him like a "horror movie villain". He compared the story to David Fincher's The Game (1997). Snyder enjoyed the story and filmed a scene at the end of Justice League—featuring Lex Luthor (Jesse Eisenberg) revealing Batman's secret identity to Deathstroke—to help set up the film. Affleck revealed in October that they were referring to the film as The Batman, but said this could change, later clarifying that it was not the final title, as it was widely reported to be. In December, he said filming was on track to begin in mid-2017 for a 2018 release. That month, a planned Justice League sequel was delayed to accommodate The Batman. Chris Terrio turned in a rewrite of the script in January 2017.

Affleck began to have reservations about directing the film, and announced in January 2017 that he was stepping down as director, while still planning to star and produce. He initially said he had stepped down to focus more on starring as Batman, but soon stated that he had been unable to get the script where he needed it and felt it was time for someone else to "have a shot at it". Affleck later added that he did not think he would have enjoyed directing the film and felt it should be directed by someone who would love working on it. At the time, Warner Bros. was re-evaluating its approach to superhero films following the release of Batman v Superman, which Borys Kit of The Hollywood Reporter said led to Affleck's film being "sidelined". The Justice League scene was altered in post-production to tease the Injustice League in a Justice League sequel instead of Deathstroke's role in The Batman, though the original was restored in the 2021 director's cut, Zack Snyder's Justice League.

=== Redevelopment under Matt Reeves ===
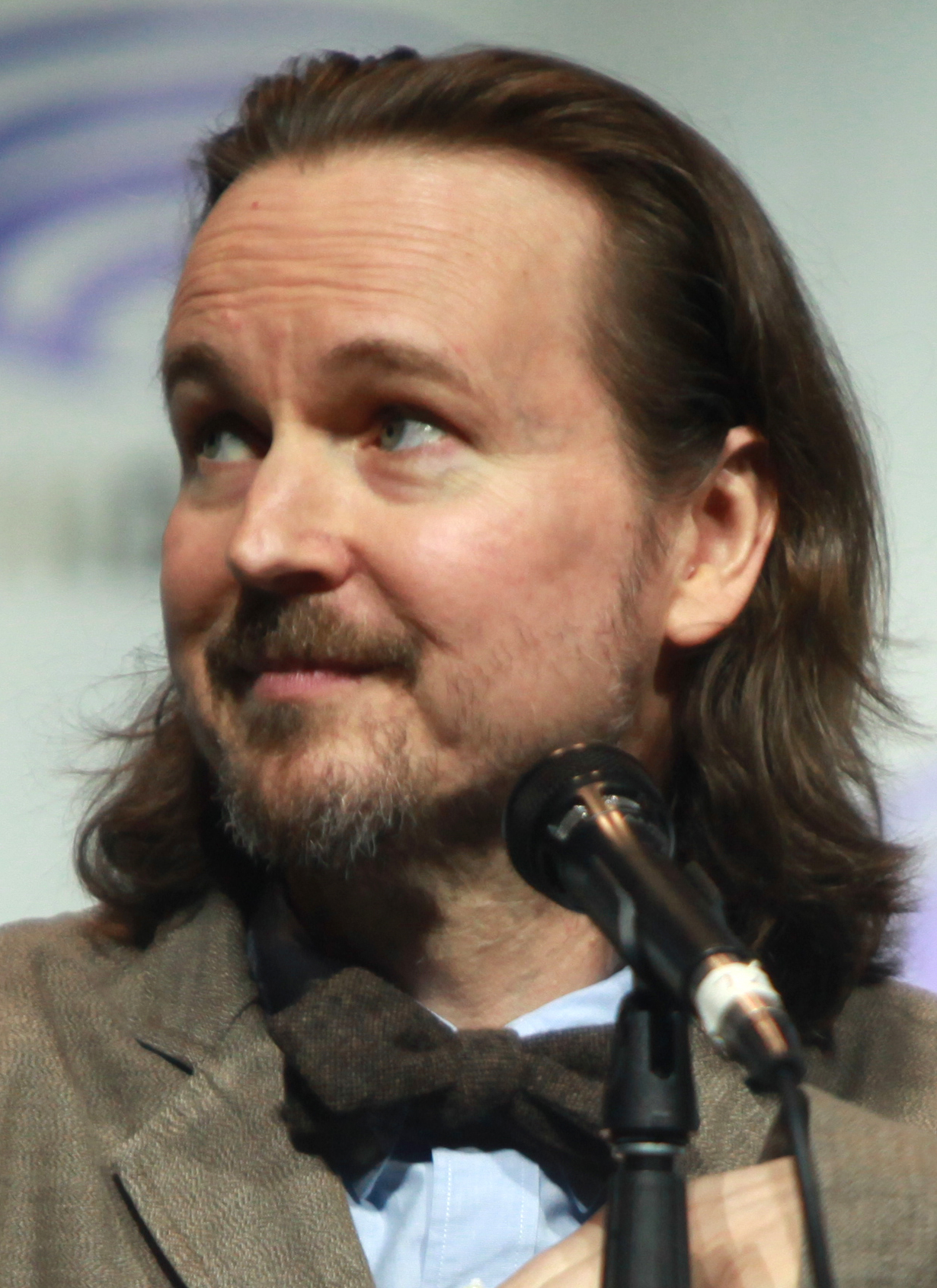
Matt Reeves took over as writer and director, and focused on a younger version of Batman.

Matt Reeves, Matt Ross, Ridley Scott, Gavin O'Connor, George Miller, Denis Villeneuve, and Fede Álvarez were all considered as replacements for Affleck as director. Reeves, a longtime Batman fan, quickly moved to the top of the shortlist and entered negotiations after meeting with Warner Bros. on February 10, 2017. Warner Bros. sent Reeves a copy of the script, but Reeves felt that Affleck's take, while "totally valid", was not the film he wanted to make. Reeves only wanted to join if he was guaranteed creative control, and Warner Bros. Pictures Group chairman Toby Emmerich—who wanted an auteur to make the next Batman film—was impressed by his initial ideas. An issue with his salary soon arose, but it was quickly overcome, and Reeves was hired to direct The Batman on February 23. He was also set to produce the film with Dylan Clark. Reeves was not willing to share his full vision with the studio while he was working on War for the Planet of the Apes (2017), and Warner Bros. agreed to delay production until he was available.

Reeves began working on the script in March 2017. He initially planned to keep The Batman's connections to the DCEU and spoke with Affleck during the writing process, but soon reworked the story to focus on Batman earlier in his vigilante career, with plans to cast a younger actor to play Batman; Warner Bros. was planning to replace Affleck by July 2017. In August 2018, Affleck went to rehabilitation for alcohol abuse, and it was considered unlikely that he would reprise his role in the film after that. At that time, Reeves said the script was nearing completion, and he hoped to finish it within a couple of weeks. He was aiming to begin production in early to mid-2019. Reeves submitted his first draft to Warner Bros. the following month. Mattson Tomlin and Peter Craig also contributed to the script, though only Reeves and Craig received credit. Tomlin used some of the ideas he developed for The Batman in a comic book limited series, Batman: The Imposter (2021).

In January 2019, Warner Bros. scheduled a release date of June 25, 2021, for The Batman, and Affleck confirmed that he was no longer starring. Affleck explained that he stepped down due to a combination of factors, including his divorce from Jennifer Garner, the tumultuous production of Justice League, his lack of enjoyment in the role at that point, and his alcohol problems. Elaborating on his Justice League experience, Affleck said it had particularly soured his interest in the role since it involved his divorce, frequent traveling, and competing agendas, as well as the death of Snyder's daughter Autumn (which led to the director's exit from the project) and the subsequent extensive reshoots for the film. Affleck recalled that he had shown a version of The Batman's script to a friend who said, "I think the script is good. I also think you'll drink yourself to death if you go through what you just went through [on Justice League] again".

== Writing ==
=== Process and Batman's characterization ===
When Reeves decided to focus on Batman earlier in his vigilante career, he began writing a new script from scratch. Affleck's script had taken an action-driven approach similar to the James Bond franchise, but Reeves wanted a more personal narrative that would "rock [Batman] to his core". He wanted to explore how the Batman mythos could exist in the real world and chose to set the film during the second year of Batman's career rather than retell the character's origin story, as he wanted his take to be different from previous Batman films. He felt the film was "more about someone who hadn't quite figured out why they were doing the thing they were doing" and wanted it to focus on Batman's emotional arc, in which "you see him go through tremendous trauma and then marshal the will to find a way through". Reeves originally intended for his version of The Batman to be set in the DCEU, but eventually decided that this would distract from Batman's character arc and asked Warner Bros. for the creative freedom to move outside of the shared universe. Reeves wanted to be able to create a version of Batman with a "personal aspect to it" and felt he should not be obligated to connect it to other aspects of the DCEU. Warner Bros.' incorporation of the multiverse in its DC productions allowed Reeves to take the project in his own direction; as a consequence, the film takes place in a separate world that was being referred to as "Earth-2".

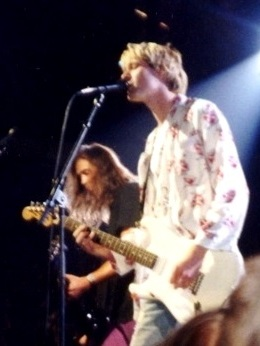
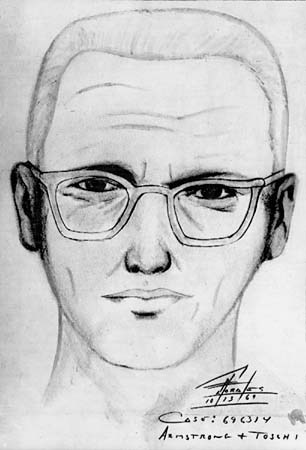
Kurt Cobain and the Zodiac Killer inspired the film's depiction of Batman and the Riddler.

In portraying Bruce Wayne, Reeves wanted to depart from the traditional playboy and socialite; because he listened to the Nirvana song "Something in the Way" (1991) as he wrote the first act, he decided to base Bruce on reclusive Nirvana frontman Kurt Cobain. He took inspiration from the film Last Days (2005), which features a fictionalized version of Cobain living in a "decaying manor". The character Michael Corleone from The Godfather (1972) also influenced Reeves's take on Bruce. Reeves sought to make Batman relatable while honoring what people love about him, and described his Batman as "still trying to figure out how to do this, how to be effective, and he's not necessarily succeeding. He's broken and driven". Although it does not depict Batman's origin—in which he witnesses the murder of his parents—The Batman still explores the emotional cost that it has on the character, with Reeves stating Batman is "emotionally stunted at being 10 years old, because that's a trauma you don't get past".

Unlike previous Batman films, The Batman focuses on Batman's detective skills, with Reeves describing it as an "almost-noir driven, detective version of Batman" emphasizing the character's heart and mind. He said the film blended the detective, action, horror, and psychological thriller genres, which he felt hewed closer to the comics than previous adaptations had. He also felt this approach made it the most frightening Batman film. Reeves looked to films and filmmakers from the New Hollywood era for inspiration, including The French Connection (1971), Klute (1971), Chinatown (1974), All the President's Men (1976), and Taxi Driver (1976), as well as the works of Alfred Hitchcock and Wong Kar-wai's short film The Hand (2004). Chinatown and All the President's Men influenced The Batman's depiction of a corrupt, decaying Gotham, while the relationship between Donald Sutherland and Jane Fonda's characters in Klute inspired the dynamic between Batman and Catwoman. Reeves said that he blended the inspirations to "inform the story, motivation, imagery, and tone" while also "conjur[ing] something... evocative and unique". To convey Batman's insecurity, Reeves added a scene, inspired by Manhunter (1986), featuring him visiting the Joker to profile the Riddler. Reeves also intended for the Joker's appearance to signify that Gotham's troubles would not end after the Riddler is captured.

Reeves and Craig had finished writing most of the script and requested Mattson Tomlin's assistance to complete the third act. They wrote the third act in six months, although Tomlin did not receive credit for his contributions. He explained that he spent that much time as he felt the "bar is therefore very high" due to Batman's popularity. He cited the scene in which Batman and Jim Gordon enter the Riddler's apartment as one of his most difficult scenes, as he wanted to visually convey Batman's fear that the Riddler is aware of his identity rather than using dialogue.

=== Story and other characterizations ===
Reeves knew early on that the film would draw from Batman: The Long Halloween (1996–97) and its sequel Dark Victory (1999–2000) by Jeph Loeb and Tim Sale, featuring Batman hunting a serial killer who "would reveal this cooperation between the people who are legitimate pillars in the city and the criminal element in the city". He decided to use the Riddler after noting parallels between the character and the Zodiac Killer, a costumed serial killer who operated in California in the 1960s, while reading Mindhunter: Inside the FBI's Elite Serial Crime Unit (1995). Reeves imagined that Batman's investigation would have him encounter other figures from the comic book mythos, leading to the introduction of characters like Catwoman, the Penguin and Carmine Falcone. However, Reeves sought to ensure that Batman remained the story's focus, and tried to include him in every scene.

Reeves re-read his favorite Batman comics, but did not base the film on a specific storyline. Particular influence came from "Batman: Year One" (1987) by Frank Miller and David Mazzucchelli, Batman: Ego (2000) by Darwyn Cooke, and "Batman: Zero Year" (2013–14) by Scott Snyder and Greg Capullo, as well as Bob Kane, Bill Finger and Neal Adams' runs on the character. Reeves drew from the depiction of a young, inexperienced Batman in "Year One", Catwoman's relationship to Falcone in The Long Halloween and Dark Victory, the exploration of Batman's psychology and his transition from exacting vengeance to inspiring hope in Ego, and the Riddler's plot to flood Gotham in "Zero Year". Other elements, such as Alfred Pennyworth's characterization, Thomas Wayne's mayoral campaign, and Martha Wayne being part of the Arkham family, came from Batman: Earth One (2012) by Geoff Johns and Gary Frank, while the theme of vengeance was inspired by Kevin Conroy's "I am vengeance, I am the night" speech from the DC Animated Universe (DCAU) television series Batman: The Animated Series (1992–1995). The film also features references to other comic storylines, including "Batman: No Man's Land" (1999) and "Batman: Hush" (2002–03).

The film contains several historical allusions, which Reeves felt would make it more believable. Two characters—Mayor Don Mitchell Jr. and District Attorney Gil Colson—share surnames with Watergate scandal figures John N. Mitchell and Charles Colson, and the Riddler's murder of Colson mirrors the death of Brian Wells. Additionally, Reeves based Falcone on Winter Hill Gang leader Whitey Bulger, citing the documentary Whitey: United States of America v. James J. Bulger (2014) as an influence; some plot elements mirror events from Bulger's life, including Falcone serving as an informant and bribing city officials.

== Pre-production ==
=== Casting ===
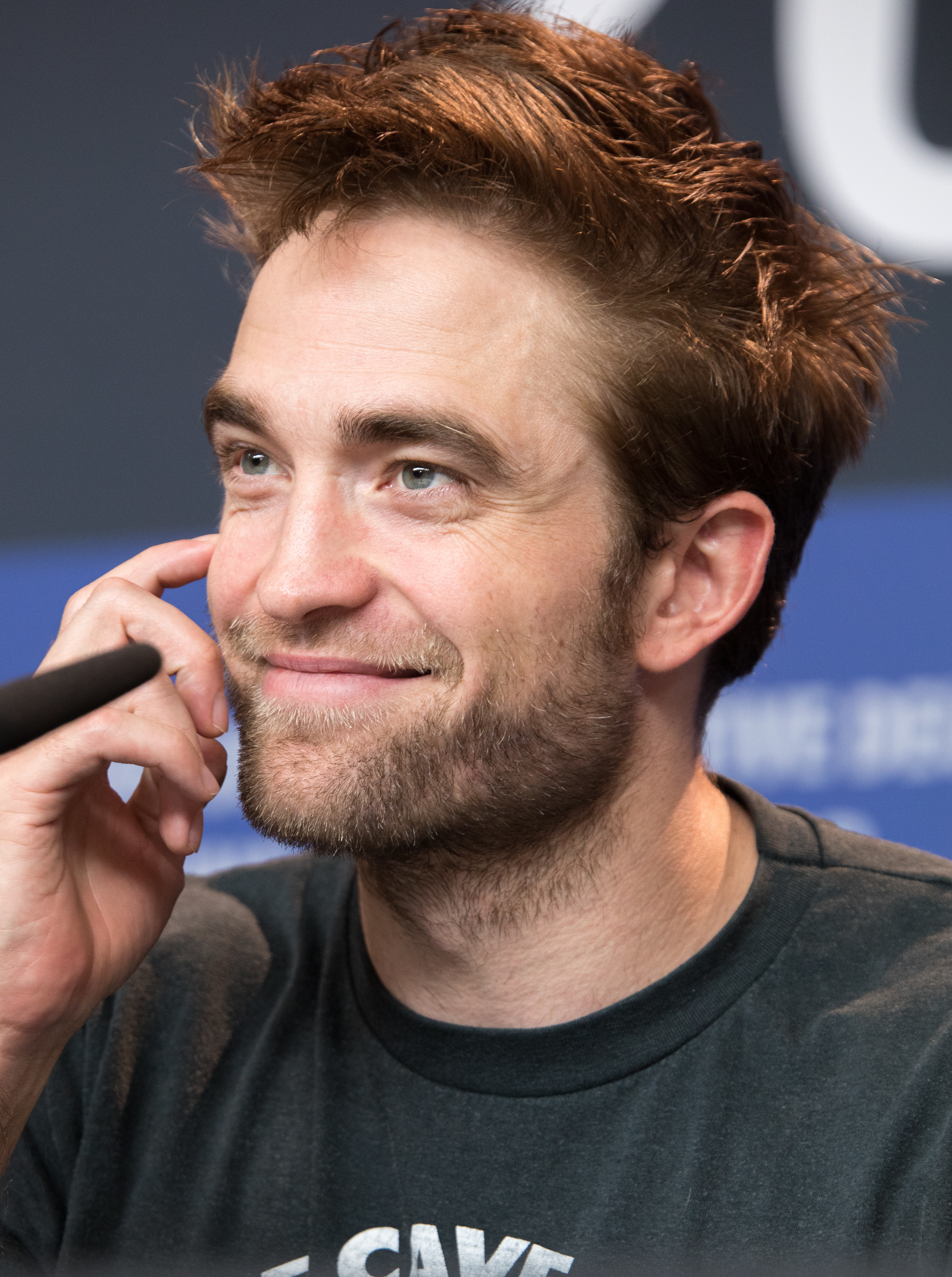
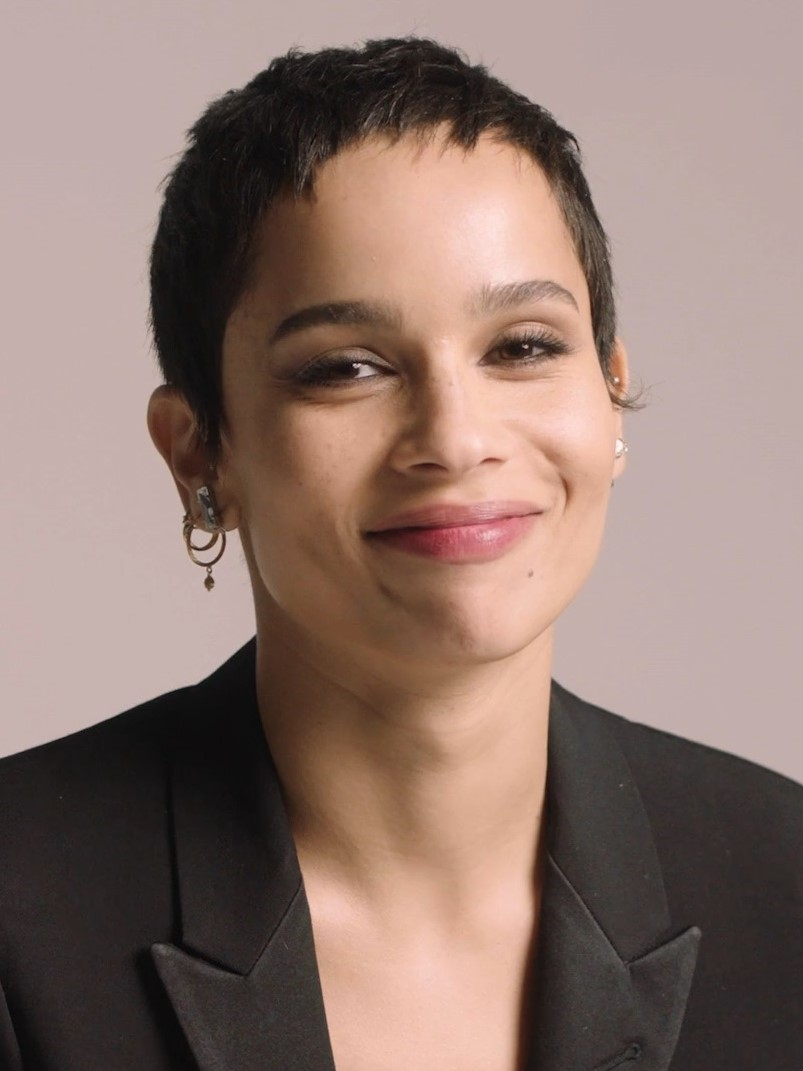
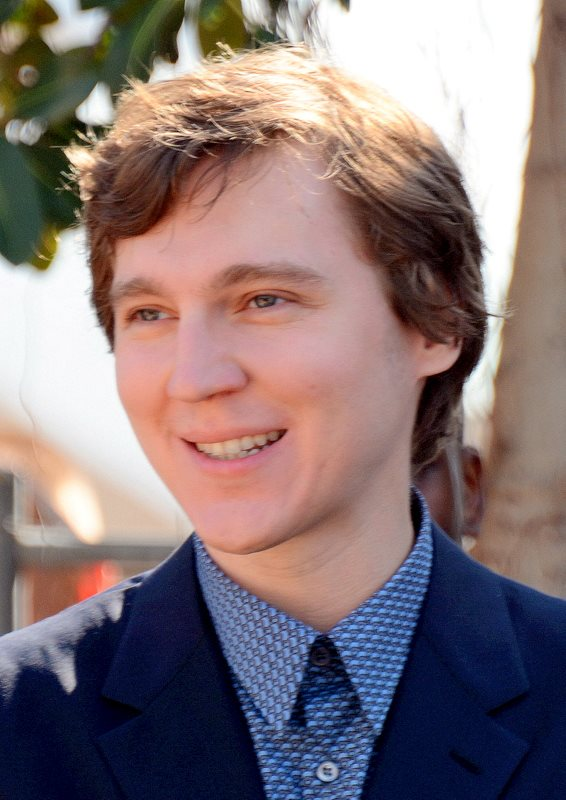
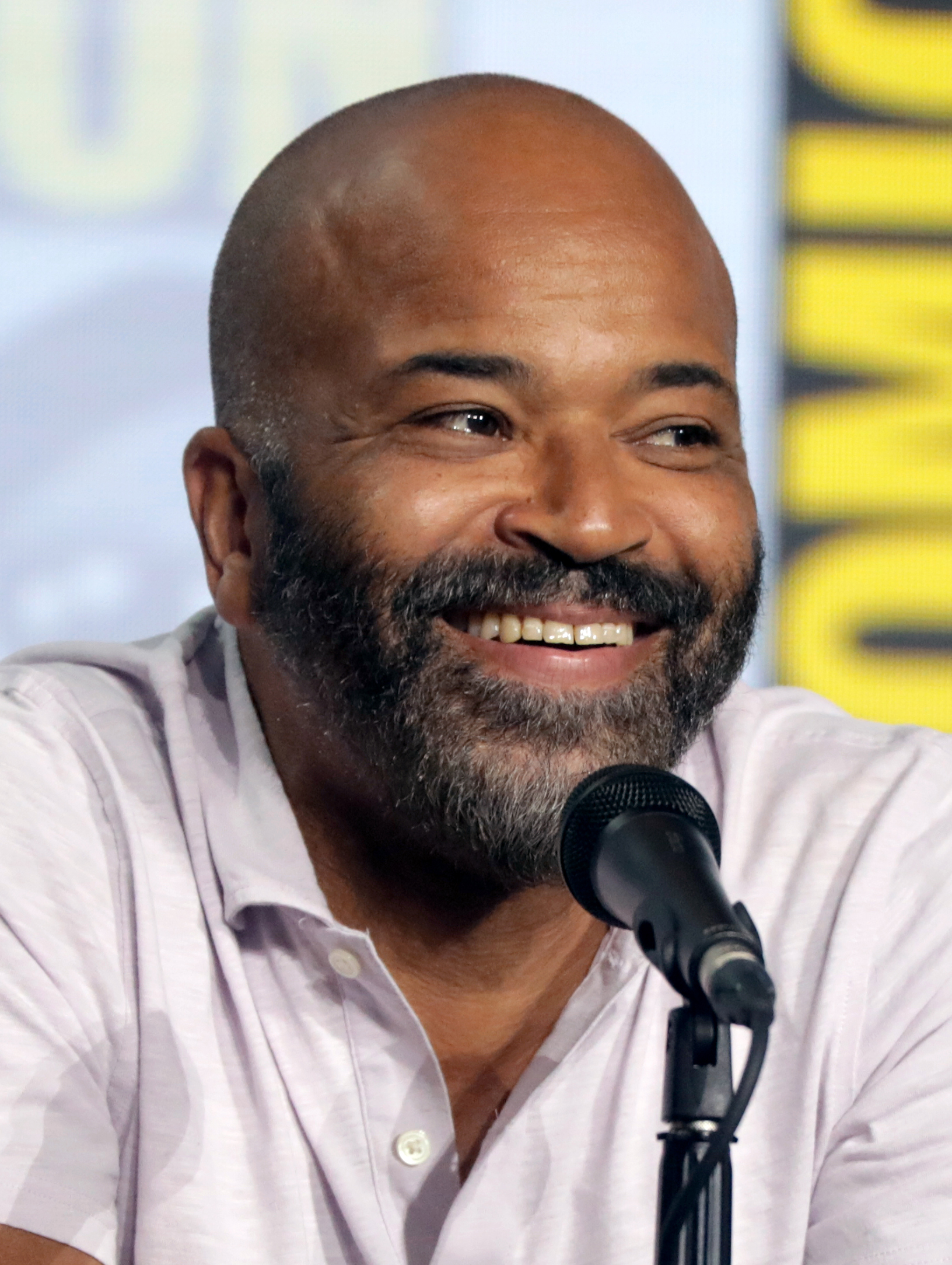
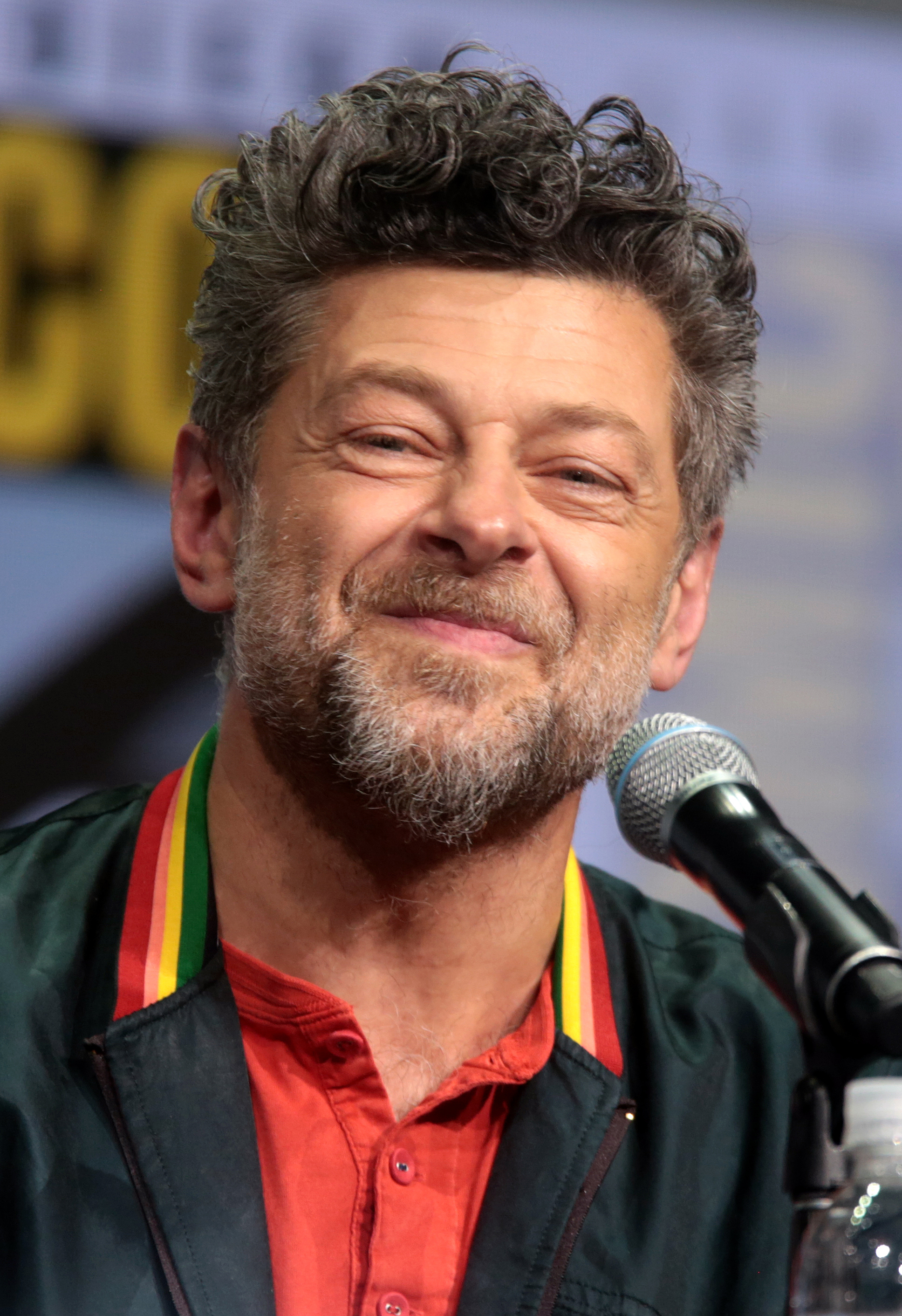
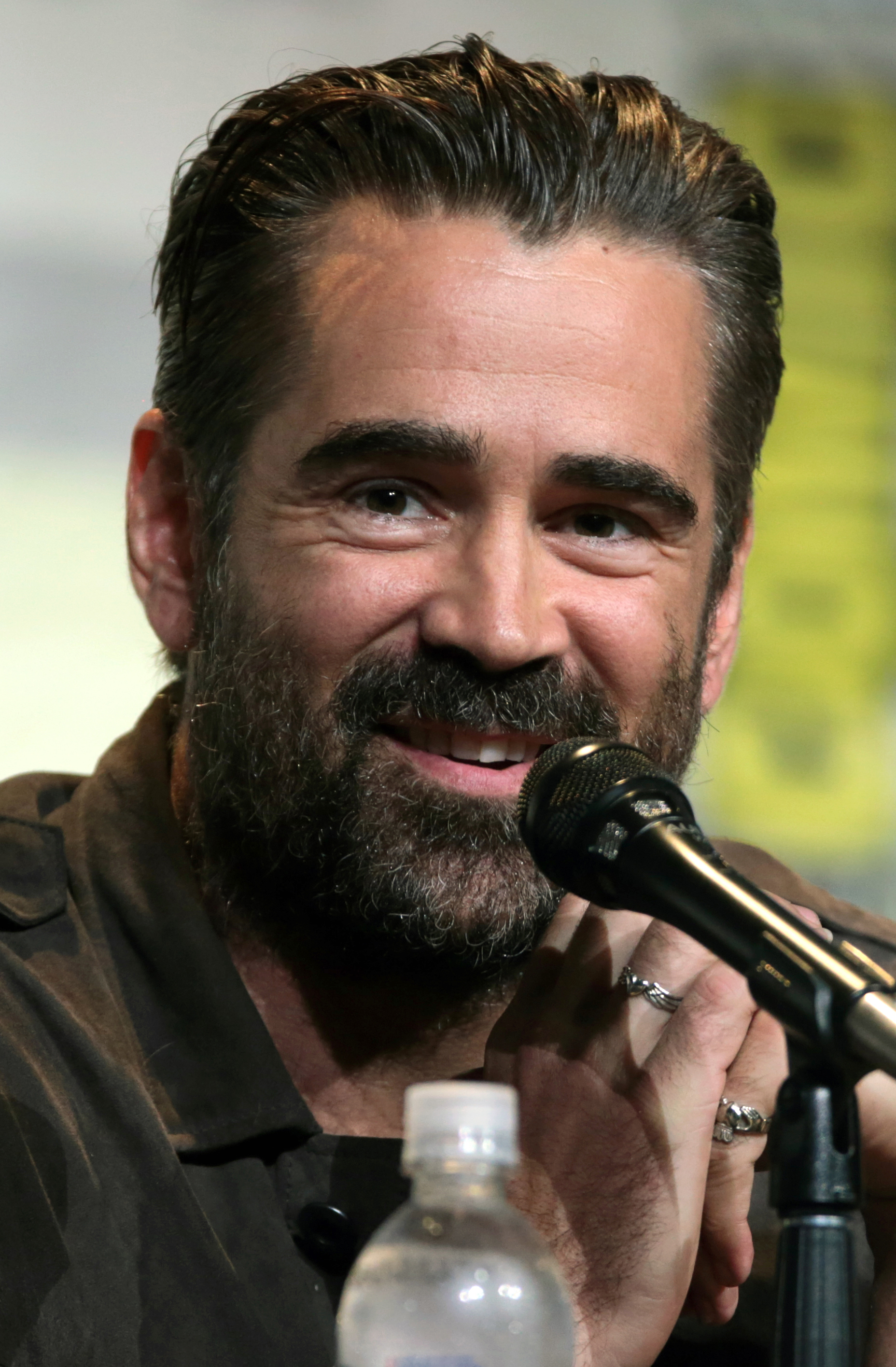
The Batman stars Robert Pattinson, Zoë Kravitz, Paul Dano, Jeffrey Wright, Andy Serkis, and Colin Farrell

Robert Pattinson, Nicholas Hoult, Armie Hammer, and Aaron Taylor-Johnson were on the shortlist to replace Affleck as Batman, with Pattinson the frontrunner. Reeves wrote the script with Pattinson in mind after seeing his performance in Good Time (2017), but was unsure if he would be interested. Pattinson had eschewed major Hollywood franchise films since his work on the Twilight series (2008–2012), as he found those roles dull and wanted to avoid paparazzi attention. This meant he had not appeared in Marvel Studios's Marvel Cinematic Universe (MCU), which made him desirable to Warner Bros. The other major contender, Hoult, portrayed Hank McCoy / Beast in 20th Century Fox's Marvel Comics–based X-Men prequel films, which are separate from the MCU, and Hoult was unrecognizable for much of them due to prosthetics and makeup.

Pattinson became interested in the role a year in advance and "kept obsessively checking up on it". A longtime Batman fan, he had ideas about how to bring a unique portrayal of the relationship between Batman's superhero activities and his identity as Bruce compared to previous film adaptations, and was interested in the character's lack of superpowers. Reeves spent hours reviewing Pattinson's and Hoult's previous work before meeting with them in April 2019. They were the only contenders for the role by May 20, and both flew to Burbank, California, for a screen test. Pattinson wore Val Kilmer's Batsuit from Batman Forever (1995) during his test since it was the only existing costume that fit him. The audition was challenging because the suit was small and difficult to move in, but Pattinson and Reeves found it a "transformative" experience. Pattinson was cast on May 31, with a salary of $3 million.

Pattinson's casting was met with backlash from some Batman fans, who launched a Change.org petition calling for the decision to be reversed. Pattinson said he found the response less vitriolic than he had expected and felt that being an underdog meant he did not have expectations to meet in his performance. He was intrigued that there had been numerous interpretations of Batman in film and wanted to fill the gap between them. Christian Bale, who played Bruce Wayne / Batman in The Dark Knight Trilogy (2005–2012), supported Pattinson, encouraging him to "make [the role] his own" and ignore critics. Bale likened the fan revolt to the backlash that Heath Ledger experienced when he was cast as the Joker in The Dark Knight (2008). To prepare, Pattinson studied Batman's history, reading comics spanning from the Golden Age of Comic Books to writer Tom King's 2016–2019 run on Batman. He trained in Brazilian jiu-jitsu with instructor Rigan Machado, wanting to undergo physical change in a similar way to superhero actors like Chris Hemsworth, Dwayne Johnson, Robert Downey Jr., and Chris Evans. He received advice from The Dark Knight Trilogy director Christopher Nolan while working with him on Tenet (2020).

Zoë Kravitz was cast as Catwoman in October 2019 following a screen test with Pattinson; she had previously voiced the character in The Lego Batman Movie (2017). Casting director Cindy Tolan suggested Kravitz, and Reeves chose her over actresses such as Ana de Armas, Ella Balinska, and Eiza González, who also auditioned for the role, as well as Zazie Beetz, Alicia Vikander, Hannah John-Kamen, and Nathalie Emmanuel. Kravitz was reluctant to join another superhero film after working on X-Men: First Class (2011), but was a fan of the Catwoman character and felt "connected to her emotionally and also aesthetically"; she felt that her honesty with Reeves played a large part in her selection, and explained that she wanted Reeves to know what working with her would be like. She provided advice on developing Catwoman's character, and began training with instructor David Higgins two months before shooting. Kravitz also studied footage of cats and lions fighting to develop her movements while practicing with stunt coordinator Rob Alonzo. She drew inspiration from "Year One" and Michelle Pfeiffer's portrayal of Selina Kyle / Catwoman in Batman Returns (1992).

Jeffrey Wright entered negotiations to portray Jim Gordon in September 2019, and was confirmed to be cast the following month. Wright, who is the first actor of color to portray Gordon in live action, felt his casting reflected how diverse America has become since Batman's introduction in 1939, and said none of Gordon's qualities "require that he be white". In preparation, Wright read Batman comics, including The Long Halloween. He looked to Golden Age comics because he felt there was a "long arc for Gordon from then until today", which inspired his performance. He also based his performance on Eric Adams, a police officer who became the mayor of New York City. Mahershala Ali was linked to the role of Gordon but passed on it to prioritize his work on the then-planned Marvel Studios film Blade. Jonah Hill initially entered negotiations to play either the Riddler or the Penguin, but exited negotiations after a month. Justin Kroll of Variety reported that Hill wanted $10 million—more than double the amount Pattinson would earn—while Kit reported that Warner Bros. and Hill could not decide which role he would take. Paul Dano was cast as the Riddler in October after Hill exited talks. To prepare, Dano researched serial killers and chose to read this material in public places since he found it disturbing and did not want to read it alone. He used the Beach Boys' founder Brian Wilson, whom he had portrayed in the biopic Love & Mercy (2014), as the basis of his performance, and was also influenced by Nirvana's songs. Reeves wrote the Riddler's character with Dano's portrayal of Wilson in mind. Dano thought about the Riddler's motivations and the character's sense of power he feels when wearing a mask, and worked with a mask expert to figure out how to approach the role in costume.

Reeves approached Andy Serkis regarding the role of Alfred during post-production on War for the Planet of the Apes, and he was eager to work with Reeves again. Serkis was cast in November 2019, when Colin Farrell and John Turturro were also cast as the Penguin and Carmine Falcone. Farrell looked to Fredo Corleone, another character from The Godfather, for inspiration and worked with dialect coach Jessica Drake to develop the Penguin's voice, while Turturro collaborated with his son Amadeo, who is an editor at DC Comics, and Reeves to develop Falcone and his mannerisms. Turturro drew inspiration from warnings his father gave him about the Mafia as a child growing up in New York City. Other cast members include Jayme Lawson, Peter Sarsgaard, Gil Perez-Abraham, twins Charlie and Max Carver, Rupert Penry-Jones, Jay Lycurgo, and Con O'Neill. Lycurgo, who portrays a criminal, shot his scenes a year before he joined the DC series Titans (2018–2023) as Tim Drake. Reeves was unsure if the Joker's appearance would be kept in the theatrical release or if the actor playing him would be able to reprise the role in the future. Consequently, he felt the actor who played the Joker needed to be "fearless". Reeves met with Barry Keoghan, who was eager to accept the offer. The production team attempted to keep Keoghan's role a secret by announcing that he was portraying GCPD officer Stanley Merkel, a character featured in "Year One", when he was cast in August 2020, but Keoghan's role as the Joker was revealed by his brother online ahead of the film's release.

=== Design ===
==== Sets and props ====
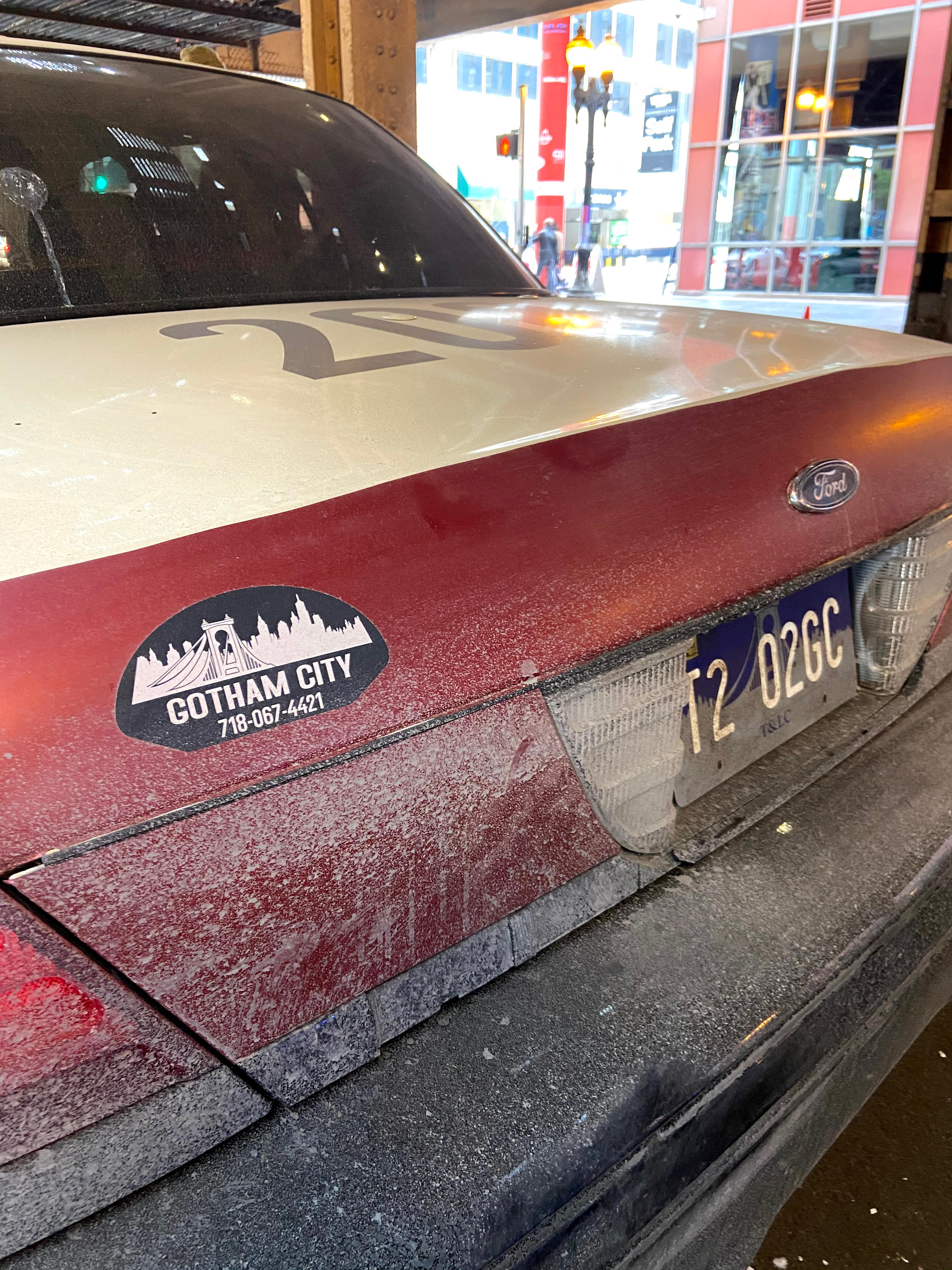
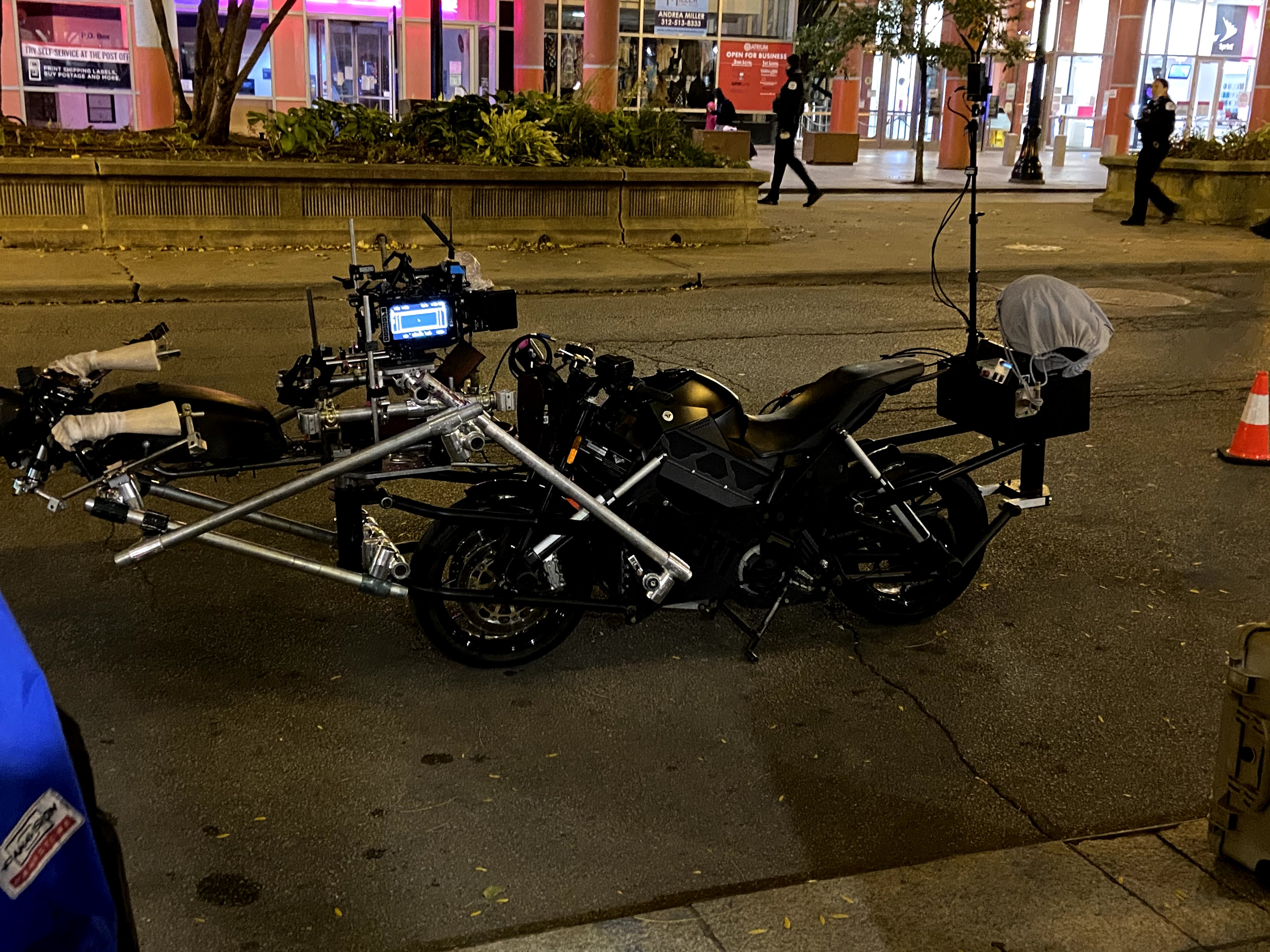
A taxi with Gotham City decal and a motorcycle rigged with a camera used during filming in Chicago

The design team began work on the Batcave and Batmobile designs before the script was finished, as Reeves had a clear vision of what The Batman's world would look like and wanted the three to reflect one another. The Batcave was based on the train station beneath New York's Waldorf Astoria Hotel and private underground railways in New York City that wealthy families used around the early 1900s. Reeves said this was a way to "root all these things in things that feel real, but also extraordinary". The Batcave, a partial set build on the Warner Bros. Studios Leavesden, also serves as the foundation of the film's depiction of Wayne Manor, which Reeves described as decaying, representing Batman's uninterest in his family's wealth. The Gotham City Hall set was built in a hangar at Cardington Airfield; the hangar also had a soundproof room that was set up for Dano to record certain Riddler scenes. Eight blocks of Gotham were designed in Warner Bros. Studios Leavesden.

Reeves and production designer James Chinlund envisioned a realistic Gotham City and drew inspiration from various locations, such as Chicago and Pittsburgh. During pre-production, Chinlund had designed virtual sets using virtual reality headsets and showed them to Reeves and Fraser, which allowed them to plan for various logistics for filming in the actual sets depicted in the headsets. He had described it as allowing Reeves to storyboard "the whole film himself", with the shots incorporated into the film. Reeves had used screengrabs from the headset for inspiration when storyboarding the Batmobile chase sequence, explaining, "I set all of these shots basically beforehand, and we made this crazy storyboard that was made of screengrabs from VR, from the lenses we had found. And so it was an incredibly involved process". Fraser had also said that this had helped the crew plan the positions of the cameras, though he noted that "VR doesn't give you the emotionality of lenses—it just gives you the mathematics of the field of view."

Chinlund drew inspiration from David Fincher's films and blended several architectural styles, including those of buildings from the 1920s to the 1940s. Since the failed economic revivals of Gotham left unfinished architecture, Chinlund "litter[ed] the skyline with these unfinished skyscrapers" to show the "grit up there". Wayne Tower, which serves as Wayne's mausoleum, was inspired by the Hearst Castle; he described it as baroque, Gothic, and ornate. The Iceberg Lounge's aesthetics were inspired by the works of Robert Moses. Fraser said that Gotham City was inspired by the depiction of cities from Chinatown and that of the New York City streets in Klute. While Fraser chose a "broader palette, which skewed towards dour and gloom", Chinlund used a different color palette when designing Selina Kyle's residence in the red-light district. He was inspired by Wong Kar-wai's films and called it a "romantic palette" of the neon and colorful street lights from those films. Chinlund described Gotham as "grim in a lot of places" and said that this environment allowed some of the colors to "pop".

Reeves envisioned a grounded, handmade design for the Batmobile, with Chinlund and concept artist Ash Thorp designing the vehicle's engine to resemble a bat. Reeves wanted the Batmobile to feel like a "wild beast" and move away from the tank-like design popularized by Nolan's The Dark Knight films in favor of one that looked like a muscle car. He looked to Stephen King's novel Christine (1983), which is about a car possessed by supernatural forces, for inspiration: "I liked the idea of the car itself as a horror figure, making an animalistic appearance to really scare the hell out of the people Batman's pursuing". Reeves and Chinlund wanted the Batmobile to feel like its own character, and Chinlund prioritized function which reflected Batman's "single-minded focus on the mission". Chinlund used a steel bumper for the frame, so Batman could "push his way through any obstacle", as well as the roof of a 1969 Dodge Charger; he left the back open since it did not require protection. Four Batmobile units were built, with the primary driving unit powered by a 650 bhp Chevrolet V8 engine constructed from over 3,000 machined parts, and the other units equipped with gimbals, water dispensers, and an electronic version for usability. Another unit was built on a Tesla chassis for indoor and night shots.

==== Batsuit ====
The Batsuit was designed by supervisor Dave Crossman and concept artist Glyn Dillon over a year, intending to design "the signature Batsuit" with two guiding concepts: it needed to "look the part", balancing light and dark while not detracting from Pattinson's emotion, and it had to be flexible; Reeves and Pattinson wanted the suit to be practical and easy to move and fight in it, inspired by the depiction of Batman in the Batman: Legends of the Dark Knight storyline "Shaman" (1989) by O'Neil and Edward Hannigan. Pattinson also asked Bale for advice during the design process, and he jokingly advised to "make sure you're gonna be able to relieve yourself" while wearing the suit. The team took scans of Pattinson's body while he was filming Tenet and used them in reference to concept art drawn by Dillon. They printed out a rough copy of each element after refining it using digital software before it was molded by supervising costume effects modeler Piere Bohmaned. Further modifications were made to each piece until Reeves approved the final suit. The team created over 20 suits for filming. The final suit is more flexible than previous Batsuits, to the point that Pattinson "immediately started doing somersaults in it just because you could" when he put on the initial prototype.

Reeves wanted the Batsuit to be utilitarian and feel as if Batman used spare parts to create it on his own, and the production team sought to evoke the iconography of the comics and balance the Batsuit's darkness without making it difficult to see. Nylon was used to create the suit and make it appear like bulletproof Kevlar, while details like bloodstains, nicks, and ricochets from bullets were added. The suit's color was chosen after consultation with Reeves, cinematographer Greig Fraser, and the costume team. The team used different shades of dark gray for the body armor, with some green and yellow accents; Crossman noted that the grays made Batman more visible. Batman's utility belt was changed from yellow to black since the team felt it was more practical and realistic, and the belt contains material used by law enforcement, such as handcuff holders and leather ammo packs. The design team looked to tactical gear from the Vietnam War for inspiration. Particular inspiration came from Lee Bermejo's art in comics like Noël (2011) and Damned (2018–19), as Reeves was impressed by Bermejo's riot gear–esque design while reading Damned, which he felt suited the realistic tone. Bermejo was not consulted regarding the design but was proud to see a Batsuit similar to his in a film.

The cowl was printed after being sculpted digitally and was created from polyurethane rubber, while it was stitched together by hand and was intended to resemble leather; the stitching around the forehead and the nose patches were influenced by Adam West's costume from the 1960s Batman television series. Dillon added that he wanted Batman to feel like the "Grim Reaper" with stillness through a skull-like cowl with a neutral expression, which allowed Pattinson to have more freedom to convey emotions through his eyes. The cape was created using artificial Japanese leather, as it was impractical to use real leather due to its weight. It transforms into a wingsuit, which was created by a Seattle–based wingsuit company using the Batsuit material. Austrian combat boots inspired the suit's boots, while the costume prop maker, Ian Jones, added a leather gaiter to embellish fight scenes and scenes when Batman rides a motorbike. The costume prop department added a special port to the Batsuit towards the end of filming to aid a scene in which Batman injects himself with adrenaline. Batman's grapple gun, which can slide out via a hidden contraption in his arm, was influenced by Travis Bickle's gun from Taxi Driver (1976). The bat symbol on his chest also serves as a knife; Dillon felt it was unrealistic for the symbol to be leather, so the team decided to make it a blade.

==== Other costumes ====
Costume design was led by Jacqueline Durran. Makeup artist Maria Donne modeled Bruce Wayne's hairstyle after Cobain, while the eyeliner he wears when suiting up as Batman featured a mix of pigments and products that would sustain rain and sweating. Catwoman's costume was designed to lay a foundation for what would become her comic book outfit while feeling "as practical as possible". The facial prosthetics that Keoghan used to portray the Joker were designed by makeup artist Mike Marino; although the Joker only appears in silhouette in the final cut, Reeves still had Marino develop a full design. Reeves wanted him to resemble Conrad Veidt's The Man Who Laughs (1928) character Gwynplaine that inspired the Joker's original portrayal in the comics. Reeves made the Joker's perpetual grin the result of a biological condition, rather than a facial scar as in previous films, to distinguish the new incarnation. The Riddler's costume was based on sketches of the Zodiac Killer; it retains the character's traditional green coat while adding a combat mask, which Dano wanted to show that the Riddler "probably felt a lot of shame or self-hatred or pain". Dano also covered himself in plastic wrap since he felt the Riddler would take extreme precautions to avoid leaving DNA at crime scenes. He became concerned about the effect this costume had on him during filming because his head was "throbbing with heat" and felt compressed due to the heat, sweat, and a lack of oxygen.

To portray the Penguin, Farrell wore prosthetics and a fat suit created by Marino. Reeves described it as "almost like a throwback Warner Bros. gangster" similar to actors John Cazale, Sydney Greenstreet, and Bob Hoskins. Farrell chose to wear a fat suit over gaining weight because he had suffered health problems when he gained weight for the television series The North Water (2021). Farrell's costume does not feature the Penguin's traditional monocle and top hat, and Warner Bros. disallowed him from smoking tobacco as he does in the comics. Farrell fought to allow him to carry a cigar instead of cigarettes, but Warner Bros. would not relent. Farrell was frequently described as "unrecognizable" in costume, to the point that Wright and Penry-Jones initially did not recognize him on set. Reeves was hesitant to make Farrell unrecognizable, as he wanted the Penguin's design to reflect the realistic tone, but accepted the design after seeing makeup tests. It took between two and four hours to apply the prosthetics, and Farrell tested the costume at a Burbank Starbucks where he "got a couple of stares" ordering a latte in-character. He described wearing the costume as "absolute liberation", adding, "When the piece moves as well as the piece that was designed for the Penguin moved, my eyebrows moved to my cheeks and my smile, it was fucking insane. I didn't have any fear that Colin could be seen through".

== Filming ==
=== Principal photography ===
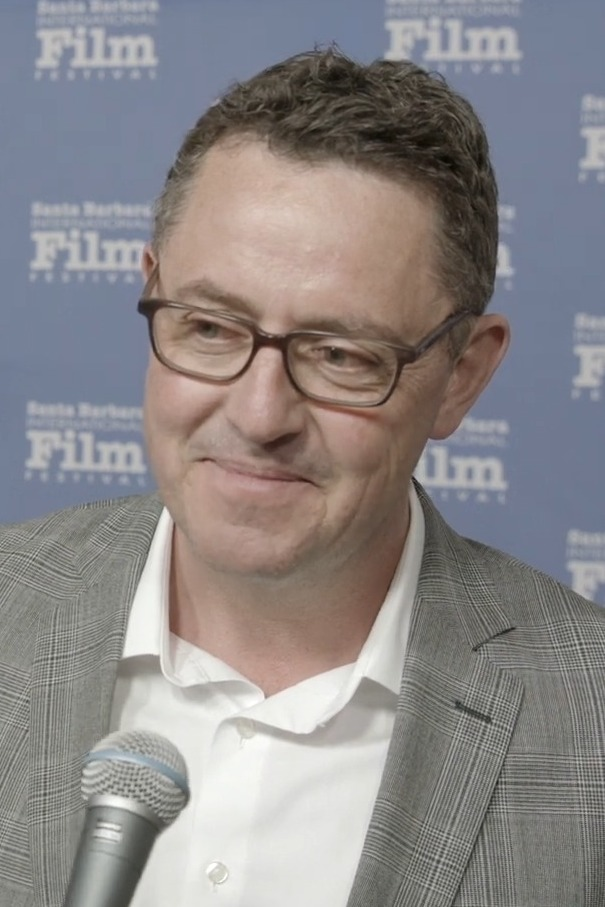
Cinematographer Greig Fraser cited Gordon Willis as inspiration and sought to convey the film from Batman's point of view.

Principal photography began in January 2020 in London, under the working title Vengeance. Reeves announced that filming had wrapped on March 13, 2021, which was a year after it was suspended by the COVID-19 pandemic, and production officially concluded on March 21. Second unit filming took place in December 2019. Greig Fraser served as the cinematographer, after previously worked with Reeves on Let Me In (2010). Cemetery scenes were filmed at the Glasgow Necropolis in Scotland in mid-February 2020, before relocating to Liverpool in March. Filming in London took place at the O2 Arena, Printworks nightclub, Kingsway tramway subway, the Two Temple Place, the Somerset House, and areas near the River Thames. Filming in Liverpool took place at St George's Hall, Anfield Cemetery, Walker Art Gallery, Wellington Square, County Sessions House, and the Royal Liver Building. One scene was filmed at the abandoned Hartwood Hospital in Shotts, Scotland, while some exterior shots and stunts were filmed in Chicago.

Fraser used digital capture on Arri Alexa LF cameras, with custom ALFA anamorphic lenses. The film was finished by being printed onto negative film stock and then transferred to an interpositive and transferred back to digital to give the image film grain and texture. Fraser cited cinematographer Gordon Willis's lighting work on Klute, The Godfather, and All the President's Men, and took inspiration from photographer Todd Hido, and at Reeves's suggestion attempted to convey the film from Batman's point of view. He described shooting the film as "one of the most challenging lighting jobs I've ever done"; filming Pattinson in the Batsuit was particularly difficult since he did not want shadows to obscure the costume's details. Pattinson broke his wrist performing a stunt towards the beginning of production, and described feeling "very much alone" while filming due to the insular nature of nighttime filming and his inability to take off his costume off-set. Industrial Light & Magic (ILM) provided the StageCraft virtual production technology that Fraser helped develop on the Disney+ Star Wars series The Mandalorian (2019–2023), with a wall of LED panels allowing visual effects backgrounds to be rendered in real-time via Unreal Engine 4. The wall was built around existing practical sets; it was used for scenes involving the abandoned skyscraper where the Bat-Signal is stationed, so Reeves and Fraser could film with consistent golden hour lighting, which is difficult when shooting on location. Using virtual production also meant the lighting impacted the actors and the set in ways green screen technology could not. Reeves was inspired by the lighting from In the Mood for Love (2000). The production team only had a few weeks to shoot the scenes.

Reeves was a meticulous director and described The Batman as the "most intricate narrative" he had worked on up to that point. Pattinson said Reeves asked for many retakes, and adjusting to such an approach took some time. Kravitz described Reeves as "the most specific person and director I've ever worked with", citing a particular instance in which he told her not to close her mouth since he thought it needed to be open to convey a certain emotion. Reeves showed the different takes to the actors after filming to illustrate the "make-or-break nuances" he had seen. One scene, in which Batman and the Riddler communicate via videotelephony, took over 200 takes. Pattinson guessed that Reeves was "editing the entire movie, every single take", which Reeves said was correct and not something that other actors he had worked with had observed. Reeves developed this style of filming, in which he spent more time on fewer angles, while directing the television series Felicity (1998–2002). Reeves filmed fake scenes with Keoghan portraying Merkel to prevent his actual role from leaking, and during the Joker scenes, Reeves kept Keoghan's face out of focus to signify that the Joker was still in his formative stages. The production team briefly discussed removing the subplot in which the Riddler's online followers attempt to assassinate Bella Reál due to its similarities to the January 6 United States Capitol attack, which occurred during the final months of filming, but Reeves decided it was too integral to the story and different enough from the attack.

For fight scenes, Reeves wanted to depart from the "kinetic, quick-cutting" sequences that previous Batman directors like Tim Burton and Nolan had shot. He wanted viewers to "actually see what's happening... in a way that is utterly convincing". The Batmobile chase scene's cinematography was inspired by the car chase scene in The French Connection. Reeves originally planned to film the scene on a Liverpool freeway, but instead filmed it at the Dunsfold Aerodrome after determining that a race track would allow for more control. Parts were also filmed at the Coryton Refinery. A camera car with a 360-degree "hydra"-like rig attached was used to capture background plate shots. The shot in which the Batmobile jumps through the fire was done practically, though the fireballs were enhanced in post-production. The interior shots of the Penguin's car rolling were achieved with a rotisserie rig on a rotating gimbal attached to the car that Farrell was in. Fraser said the crew worked against logistics and time to convey the chase from Batman's perspective by attaching cameras to different vehicles, despite the technical difficulties in doing so. Fraser used different camera lenses and coated them with silicone to simulate rain and dirt, immersing the viewer.

=== Impact of the COVID-19 pandemic ===
Production was disrupted by the COVID-19 pandemic, beginning two months into filming. When the pandemic began, Warner Bros. did not plan to suspend shooting, unlike other major studios. However, it eventually did so on March 14, 2020. Warner Bros. stated that the hiatus would just be for two weeks, but Reeves announced on March 25 that filming had been suspended indefinitely. Production was unlikely to restart until at least mid-May, and in April, Warner Bros. pushed the release date back to October 1, 2021. On March 31, the production's dialect coach, Andrew Jack, died of complications from COVID-19. Around a quarter of filming was completed before the suspension, and Reeves began looking over that footage to help plan for the rest of filming. Reeves did not rewrite the script but used the time to explore the film's tone. During the shutdown, Pattinson was provided with a Bosu ball and a weight to work out with, but did not believe in doing so all the time because it would "set a precedent" he did not want to entertain. Meanwhile, Kravitz exercised five days a week. On May 12, the UK government said high-end film productions could resume shooting as soon as employers put COVID-19 safety measures in place. A month later, The Batman was permitted to restart production in July at the earliest. Clark said Jack's death haunted the crew as they prepared to resume production.

By September 3, filming had resumed for three days at Warner Bros. Studios Leavesden, only to be put on pause again after Pattinson tested positive for COVID-19. The filming crew then entered a two-week quarantine, after which filming was set to resume, while construction on the sets and props at Leavesden Studios continued. Following this, Reeves became concerned that he would be unable to finish the film if he contracted COVID-19, so he wore a mask, scuba diving goggles, and a head covering on set. Pattinson stated that approximately 90% of the film was shot in the studio. Filming resumed on September 17, after Pattinson was cleared to return to set. At this point, the film had approximately three more months of filming and was expected to finish by the end of 2020. Filming was limited to England, and crew members were required to live close to the production area and not leave the surrounding community until production ended. Pattinson compared filming during the pandemic to a "military operation", saying the cast and crew used earpieces to communicate directions and limit their interactions. Some scenes were filmed with a remote-controlled camera, which Pattinson found strange because he could not tell if any crew members were around. Kravitz added that production became "impersonal" since mask mandates and other precautions meant the crew could not interact much. In early October, the film's release was pushed to March 4, 2022, due to the production delays. Certain Riddler scenes, such as the interrogation scene, were originally intended to be filmed towards the end of production but were filmed early due to the pandemic.

== Post-production ==
=== Editing ===
The editing for The Batman was challenging due to the COVID-19 pandemic. After production wrapped in 2021, the post-production team was set up on the Warner Bros. lot in Burbank, California. Hula Post set up the workflow and installed nine Avid editing systems. Due to the strict COVID-19 protocols the studio implemented, editors William Hoy and Tyler Nelson could not sit with Reeves side by side, which was how they were accustomed to working. The solution was to set Reeves up in a separate room with the ability to mirror what was on both editors' Avids, their assistant editors as well as other members of the team. Reeves was given a non-working Avid with a mixing board, a 5.1 surround sound setup, a 65-inch (1,700 mm) OLED playback monitor, and desktop screen playbacks which imitated Reeves looking over the shoulders of Hoy and Nelson. According to Hula Post's Senior Support Engineer, James Tejada, this environment was created so the entire editing team could work collaboratively and see each other's playbacks using additional hardware. Two Mac Minis connected to a local NEXIS network allowed Reeves to perform multiple screen shares, with the addition of a video switcher to provide access to outputs from any Avid used by the entire editing team. It was the first time such a unique dynamic was deployed. The Batmobile car chase was the first scene that sound designer Will Files worked on, and he used a bottle rocket sound effect as the basis for how the car sounded. Files collaborated with Douglas Murray and Andy Nelson to complete the sequence. The Batmobile's main engine noise came from a Ford big block engine, while the supercharger sound effect was a reversed World War II Jeep recording.

Warner Bros. held test screenings in late 2021; some early screenings showed a four-hour-long cut. Test audiences were not told they were seeing The Batman until entering the theater. The first cut was longer than Reeves intended, and he felt test screening it then to be rough because he had not yet edited the entire cut, saying "[t]here was so much of the movie yet to be touched". Reeves was "terrified" going into the first test screening, but was relieved when test audiences enjoyed the complex narrative. He felt it "kind of validated that this was a direction that an audience would be excited about", and future test screenings were met with improved reception. Reeves then progressed through the cut and made minor adjustments to ensure that small details were made clear. Later test screenings showed two cuts, with an unknown actor, possibly Keoghan, included in only one. The final screening took place during the week beginning November 29, after which Warner Bros. executives decided which cut they preferred. Reeves kept the penultimate scene—in which the Joker befriends the Riddler in Arkham—because he felt it heightened the stakes of Batman and Catwoman's final conversation while completing the Riddler's story arc, but he cut the Manhunter–inspired scene for being unnecessary and disrupting the pacing. The final cut runs at 176 minutes including credits, making The Batman the longest Batman film and the third-longest superhero film after Zack Snyder's Justice League and Avengers: Endgame (2019). The final film was produced on a budget of $185–200 million.

In January 2022, The Batman received a PG-13 rating from the Motion Picture Association, despite wide speculation and internal discussions at Warner Bros. that its somber tone and violent content would lead to it being the first theatrical Batman film with an R-rating. The film received a PG-13 rating because it does not include excessive profanity or nudity. Rebecca Rubin of Variety opined that an R-rating could have hurt the film's box office potential by preventing many young males from seeing it, noting that the two previous R-rated DC films, Birds of Prey (2020) and The Suicide Squad (2021), both underperformed commercially. Reeves said that he always intended to make The Batman PG-13 and that there was not an alternate R-rated cut. He added that a PG-13 rating was one of the only studio mandates he faced.

=== Visual effects ===
External video
- The Making Of The Batman | The Batman | HBO Max (archive) presents behind-the-scenes footage of the film's visual effects work, YouTube video from HBO Max's channel

Dan Lemmon served as the visual effects supervisor, after previously collaborating with Reeves on the Planet of the Apes films. Visual effects vendors included Wētā FX, ILM, Scanline VFX, and Crafty Apes, with over 1,500 visual effects shots created on a $20 million budget. According to Lemmon, ILM had done work with Gotham, and its StageCraft group handled rendering LED backgrounds in real-time during production. Moreover, Scanline VFX handled most of the third act and complex simulations; Wētā FX handled the Batmobile pursuit and other standalone environments; and Crafty Apes performed significant work on 2D and issue fixes. Chinland designed the Gotham cityscape so it could be created digitally by ILM and displayed in the background of scenes using the StageCraft technology. He used plate shots from London, New York, and Chicago; according to Lemmon, Reeves wanted the cityscapes to capture the "forms, architecture, and the fabric of the city to look like it was really in decay". Chinland originated the idea to place the Bat-Signal on an abandoned building rather than on top of the GCPD building. Due to the COVID-19 pandemic, a majority of the buildings were created using computer-generated imagery (CGI). Lemmon stated that using Unreal Engine to render the LED-walls in real time helped the team plan logistics for production, such as "how big the sets needed to be, where process screens would go, what the extensions would look like through the camera, where stunt rigging and special effects equipment would go" and allowing Fraser to adjust lighting. Portable LED screens showing advertisements were used when filming scenes in Gotham Square to augment the lighting of the jumbotrons in post-production.

Wētā FX created over 320 VFX shots for the film. They had begun contacting Lemmon and Warner Bros. about working on the film by the middle of 2019. Anders Langlands, the visual effects supervisor for Wētā, had already traveled to the UK by December 2019 to see pre-production work. They were initially planned to be on set during filming, but this did not happen due to the COVID-19 pandemic. Langlands said that Wētā worked on the film for over a year and that the team efficiently set up their crew for a smooth transition to remote work. For the Batmobile chase sequence, four vehicles were constructed by visual effects supervisor Dominic Tuohy, two of which could be driven via remote control, and portions of the scene were shot practically. Wētā was then tasked with fleshing out the sequence, using CGI to add rain and vehicles and help form the "beats" of the chase, such as the Penguin causing a fuel truck explosion. One of Wētā's biggest tasks was replicating Fraser's cinematography, which they performed using the Manuka renderer and virtual cinematography. They also bought glass plates and silicone sealants to replicate Fraser's process of inserting silicone on the lenses. Furthermore, the team, including the compositing staff members Peter Hillman, Ben Morgan, and Beck Veitch, upgraded their tools that performed deep focus effects, allowing them to emulate the bokeh and optical vignetting resulting from Fraser's camera lens.

The team found it difficult to insert rain into the Batmobile chase because of the physics and rain's oscillation, which they wanted to replicate. They began by creating a rain primitive to adjust the speed and phases of rain oscillation, with supervisor Christos Parliarnos setting the primitive on the Houdini particle system to animate the rain speed. The team also created an adjustable car rig for the camera team to use for tracking. The camera team could then adjust the headlights and wheels, allowing the VFX team to create accurate 3D models of each car, thereby facilitating the insertion of additional cars during post-production. Other CGI elements of the scene included the Batmobile's collision with Penguin's car, as well as Batman's cape and boots. Wētā designed the entrance of the Batcave to accommodate shots of Bruce's motorcycle; Reeves could not film the scenes due to the size of the sets. They digitally created the space using models provided by the art department and plate shots; it sought to emulate Fraser's lighting, drew inspiration from the Tribune Tower, and inserted bats. Additionally, Wētā used CGI to create higher balconies and windows for the City Hall set, as the practical set ended at the first balcony. The team experienced difficulty compositing the CGI architecture to the practical due to distortion and focus falloff caused by the lenses. In fight scenes, the team replaced stunt double Rick English's face with Pattinson's using paintings and facial animations.

Scanline VFX created over 217 VFX shots across 11 sequences. It was responsible for the design of the destruction of the water dams, the subsequent tsunami rushing towards Gotham Square Gardens, and Catwoman's burglary. For the burglary, the team used digital doubles for Pattinson and Kravitz, and facial replacements for footage shot with stunt doubles. A CGI arena was created for the Gardens so that cameras could be placed anywhere on set; its exterior was based on scans and plate shots of exterior locations in Chicago and the Madison Square Garden, while the ground level and entrance were based on the O2 Arena. The overall arena set was the only one that used blue screens, with principal photography from O2 being used to create the backgrounds. Simulations were used to replicate water, architectural destruction, fire, smoke, and electric arcing for the final act, with Houdini being used for rigid body simulations and Flowline for water simulations. The artists began by creating low-resolution simulations and progressively animating them at higher speeds, using footage of tsunamis as a reference. They did not need to make significant lighting adjustments and focused mainly on color-correcting the water. Practical explosions were modified with CGI, while other modifications included environmental interactions, such as fire, smoke, and shockwaves that generated dust and dirt. Rendering glass during the explosion of the Gotham Square Gardens roof was difficult due to the "pings, reflections, and refractions", while scenes involving arcing electricity from disconnected cables and rafter beams from the interior of Gotham Square Gardens required "significant art direction". The team also performed set extensions from practical sets and reconstructed them using plate photography for action scenes located in the rafters. They used Eyeline Studios' volumetric capture tools to replace the stunt doubles' faces. Additional setups were created to match Fraser's process of inserting caulk on the lenses, while crowds were inserted using CGI.

=== Music ===
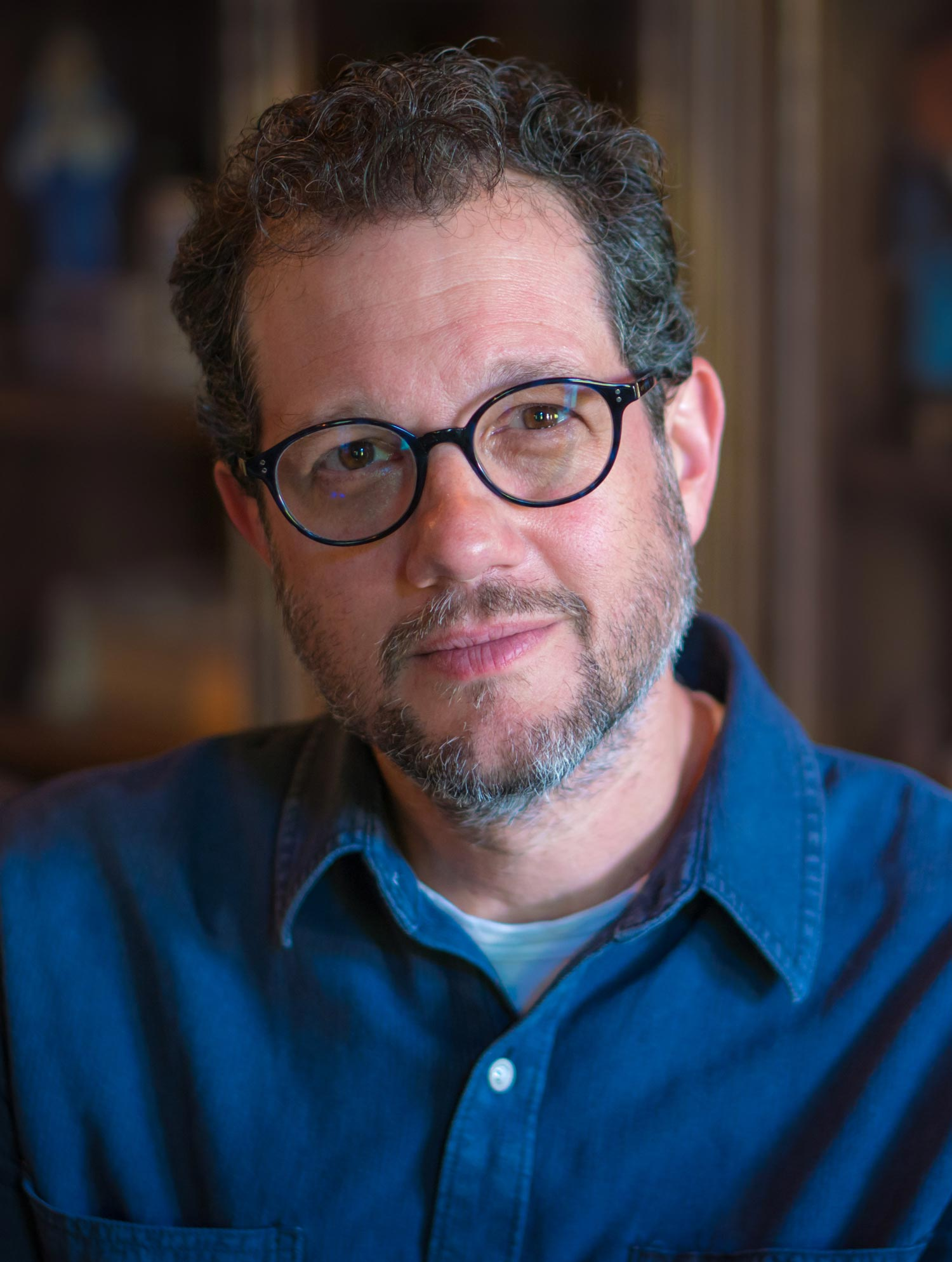
Composer Michael Giacchino wrote the main theme shortly after joining the film.

In October 2019, Reeves announced that his frequent collaborator Michael Giacchino would compose the film's score. Later that month, Giacchino said he had already finished writing the main theme for the film because he was so excited to do so; because this music was written much earlier in the production than is usual for a film, Giacchino and Reeves were able to use it in promotional materials. Giacchino said he felt total freedom to write the music he wanted for the film, agreeing with Reeves that this was their vision of Batman, similar to how different comic book and graphic novel authors and artists over the years had created different takes on the character. Giacchino completed the score in October 2021. "Something in the Way" by Nirvana appears twice in the film, and was noted to have a similar bassline to Giacchino's score. He acknowledged this but said it was a lucky coincidence. "Ave Maria" by Franz Schubert is also featured and was performed by the Tiffin Boys' Choir and Dano.

== See also ==
- List of accolades received by The Batman (film)
- Production of Justice League (film)
- Development of the DC Extended Universe
- Batman in film
