= Ride with Norman Reedus =

2016 AMC TV show

- Season 1 promotional poster
- Genre: Documentary; Travel
- Starring: Norman Reedus
- Theme music composer: The Well
- Country of origin: United States
- Original language: English
- No. of seasons: 7
- No. of episodes: 37

Production
- Executive producers: Ken Druckerman; Banks Tarver; Norman Reedus; Anneka Jones; Elizabeth Ashe; Geoff O'Brien
- Producers: Kevin Vargas; Elizabeth Ashe; Stuart Fero
- Cinematography: Ethan Mills; Jeremy Schneider
- Editors: Diana Decilio; Geoff O'Brien; Dave Tung; Jon LeClaire
- Camera setup: Single-camera
- Running time: 37–43 minutes
- Production companies: bigbaldhead (seasons 4–7); Left/Right Productions; AMC Studios

Original release
- Network: AMC
- Release: June 12, 2016 – September 28, 2025

Ride with Norman Reedus is an American travel documentary television series that premiered on AMC on June 12, 2016, and concluded on September 28, 2025, after seven seasons comprising 37 episodes. The series follows actor and motorcycle enthusiast Norman Reedus, where he and a guest of the week travel across a different destination on a motorcycle while exploring local biker culture and various locales.

AMC ordered the series on October 29, 2015. The idea came from AMC president of original programming Joel Stillerman, who called Reedus about doing a show about his love for motorcycles to which Reedus replied "Yes, yes, yes right away" before Stillerman could change his mind. Reedus picks the ride companion for each episode due to their history and location, like Peter Fonda, who starred in the film Easy Rider.

In September 2016, AMC renewed the series for a second season, which premiered on November 5, 2017. In September 2017, AMC renewed the series for a third season, which premiered on February 10, 2019. In January 2019, AMC renewed the series for a fourth season, which premiered on March 8, 2020. In December 2019, AMC renewed the series for a fifth season, which premiered on March 7, 2021. By July 2023, the series had been renewed for a sixth season, which premiered on September 10, 2023. By March 2025, the series had been renewed for a seventh and, ultimately, final season, which premiered on September 14, 2025.

== Guests ==
=== Season 1 ===
- Imogen Lehtonen – Jewelry designer/friend
- Balthazar Getty – Actor
- Jason Paul Michaels – Custom bike builder
- Jake Lamagno – Artist/friend
- Brent Hinds – Musician
- Peter Fonda – Actor

=== Season 2 ===
- Jeffrey Dean Morgan – Actor
- Dave Chappelle – Actor/comedian
- Greg Nicotero – Director/make-up artist
- Aimee Nash – Musician
- Patrick Hoelck – Filmmaker/photographer
- Mario Batali – Chef

=== Season 3 ===
- Jeffrey Dean Morgan – Actor
- Andrew Lincoln – Actor
- Ian Anderson – Singer
- Elspeth Beard – Motorcyclist
- Steven Yeun – Actor
- Les Claypool – Singer/bassist
- Melissa McBride – Actor
- Austin Amelio – Actor
- Sean Patrick Flannery – Actor
- Marilyn Manson – Singer

=== Season 4 ===
- Michael Rooker – Actor
- Ryan Hurst – Actor
- Milo Ventimiglia – Actor
- Dom Rocket – DJ/friend
- Becky Goebel – Motorcyclist/writer
- Clifton Collins Jr. – Actor

=== Season 5 ===
- Josh Brolin – Actor
- Dylan McDermott – Actor

=== Season 6 ===
- Keanu Reeves – Actor/co-founder of ARCH Motorcycle
- Josh Holloway – Actor
- Johnny Knoxville – Actor/stunt performer
- Adri Law – Artist

=== Season 7 ===
- Kim Coates – Actor
- Melissa McBride – Actor
- Robert Patrick – Actor
- Zahn McClarnon – Actor
- Greg Nicotero – Director/make-up artist
- Scott M. Gimple – Writer/producer

== Episodes ==
| Season | Episodes | Originally released | |
| Season | Episodes | First released | Last released |
|---|---|---|---|
| 1 | 6 | June 12, 2016 | July 17, 2016 |
| 2 | 6 | November 5, 2017 | December 4, 2017 |
| 3 | 6 | February 11, 2019 | March 18, 2019 |
| 4 | 6 | March 8, 2020 | April 12, 2020 |
| 5 | 6 | March 7, 2021 | April 25, 2021 |
| 6 | 4 | September 10, 2023 | October 1, 2023 |
| 7 | 3 | September 14, 2025 | September 28, 2025 |

=== Season 1 (2016) ===
| No. overall | No. in season | Title | Original release date | U.S. viewers (millions) |
|---|---|---|---|---|
| 1 | 1 | "California: Pacific Coast Highway" | June 12, 2016 | 0.748 |
Norman invites jewelry designer and friend Imogen Lehtonen to ride up the scenic cliffs of the PCH (Pacific Coast Highway). They start out in Los Angeles, winding 400 miles up the coast, stopping in Santa Barbara and Pismo Beach, ending up in the biker town of Santa Cruz. Along the way, they go beach dune-buggying, test ride gas-less bikes of the future, called Zero electric bikes and joins in on a biker podcast.
| 2 | 2 | "Death Valley: Dante's View" | June 19, 2016 | 0.470 |
Norman invites actor and best buddy Balthazar Getty for an epic ride through two states. They start out in Las Vegas, Nevada, heading 120 miles west on Nevada Highway 160 through the mountains and valleys across states lines into California, deep into the heart of Death Valley. Their bikes of choice are matching red Ducatis. Along the way, they stop to see Zombie Burlesque show, ride souped-up dirt bikes and meet up with Nina and Anya, co-founders of "Babes Ride Out" to ride Artist's Drive and Dante's View.
| 3 | 3 | "Appalachia: Blue Ridge Parkway" | June 26, 2016 | 0.627 |
Norman invites custom bike builder Jason Paul Michaels from Brother Moto to ride through Appalachia. Norman's bike of choice is a Confederate Hellcat while Jason Paul's bike is a Motus MST. They start out in Atlanta, Georgia, heading north into some of the most beautiful roads in the south. Along the way, they plan on hitting the Fontana Dam, riding the famous "Dragon's Tail" and heading up the Blue Ridge Parkway all the way up to Asheville, North Carolina. They stop to hang out with the locals at the Deal's Gap and join in on the biker festivities and also watch the mini-bike races. They also stop by Howling Moon Distillery and get some authentic Appalachian moonshine while listening to some old moonshine stories.
| 4 | 4 | "Texas: Twisted Sisters" | July 3, 2016 | 0.584 |
Norman invites his New York-based artist and friend Jake Lamagno to ride the back roads of Texas. They start their ride in Austin, heading west through Hill Country on Ranch Road 336 to ride the legendary "Twisted Sisters" near Medina, ending up in San Antonio. Norman's bike of choice is his custom Triumph Tiger 800XCX while Jake's bike is a 1977 Harley Davidson Sportster. They stop at Limey Bikes, visit film director Robert Rodriguez at Troublemaker Studios to check out his movie bikes, see Norman's favorite band, The Well, and shoot vintage weapons at homemade targets at a gun range called A Place to Shoot.
| 5 | 5 | "Louisiana: Crescent City" | July 10, 2016 | 0.611 |
Norman invites Mastodon guitarist Brent Hinds for a ride through southern Louisiana. They begin in Lafayette through the Atchafalaya Basin into Baton Rouge, following the Great River Road south along the Mississippi River, ending up in New Orleans. Their bikes of choice are Triumph Tigers. They start their journey at a taco joint named Taco Sisters before meeting Mike Clay to catch several crayfish in his pond. It's back on the road in Henderson to meet Captain Tucker for an airboat ride through the swamp with alligators. Back on the bikes, they cruise around Baton Rouge, go aboard the Hollywood Casino on a riverboat and stop at Middendorf's. Finally, they arrive in Crescent City. They first stop at Abracadabra Tattoos where they get tribute tattoos to the late Lemmy Kilmister of Motörhead, followed by a visit to a priestess to perform a voodoo ceremony in front of a shrine of Marie Laveau. Next, they eat at Elizabeth's for boudin, then meet an all-girl motorcycle group (Caramel Curves) to celebrate their 11th anniversary with a ride around the city. Norman and Brent end their trip with a walk around Bourbon Street.
| 6 | 6 | "The Keys with Peter Fonda" | July 17, 2016 | 0.632 |
Norman takes a legendary ride with one of his idols, Easy Rider actor Peter Fonda, who inspired him to first get on a motorcycle. They go on an adventure through the swamp of the Florida Everglades. They start in Naples, stop in Miami, then take the Overseas Highway on the Seven Mile Bridge south to Key West, Peter's old stomping grounds. Norman's bike of choice is a Triumph Tiger 800XC, while Peter's bike is a Triumph Thunderbird Storm. They try alligator meat at Joanie's Blue Crab Café, check out Lucky Cole's biker campground, test ride Moto Guzzis, learn how to roll their own cigars, and eat hogfish sandwiches at Hogfish Grill. Lastly, they make it to the Southernmost point buoy.

=== Season 2 (2017) ===
| No. overall | No. in season | Title | Original release date | U.S. viewers (millions) |
|---|---|---|---|---|
| 7 | 1 | "Spain with Jeffrey Dean Morgan" | November 5, 2017 | 1.072 |
While on a The Walking Dead press tour in Barcelona, Norman and co-star Jeffrey Dean Morgan set out to tour Spain; Norman riding a Triumph Tiger XCx and Jeffrey Dean, a Brixton BX 125 motorcycle. They have breakfast at a cafe in Barcelona, meet a couple of Norman's friends from Free Kustom Bikes on La Rambla, tour the Sagrada Família, and greet fans. They then travel to Sitges, where Norman lived for a year in the late 1990s. They end their trip in Valencia, hanging out with Alicia Sornosa, the first Spanish woman to ride a motorcycle across the world, at the Falles festival, and later shoot fireworks with Jeffrey Dean's family.
| 8 | 2 | "Lowcountry with Dave Chappelle" | November 6, 2017 | 0.323 |
Norman rides through the Low Country with comedian Dave Chappelle while he's on his comedy tour. They meet up in Charleston, South Carolina and coast though the Sea Islands to go oystering on Bowens Island. Next, they hangout David "Sully" Sullivan, a local photographer and biker. Then they ride 70 miles to Saint Helena Island to visit the historic Penn Center to learn about Gullah history. Their last stop takes them to Savannah, Georgia, where they race down Hutchinson Island Race Track, America's first grand prix with some vintage bikers from Coastal Empire Moto.
| 9 | 3 | "California: Joshua Tree" | November 13, 2017 | 0.397 |
Norman Reedus rides from Los Angeles to Joshua Tree, visits friends including Greg Nicotero, and explores Southern California's hidden gems.
| 10 | 4 | "New Mexico: White Sands" | November 20, 2017 | 0.425 |
Norman and musician Aimee Nash ride from Albuquerque to White Sands, N.M.; they ride ziplines, eat chili and test out government-grade weapons.
| 11 | 5 | "Hawaii: The Big Island" | November 27, 2017 | 0.408 |
Norman and photographer Patrick Hoelck ride the Big Island of Hawaii; taking in local customs like fishing, ukulele music, and exploring volcanoes.
| 12 | 6 | "My New York" | December 4, 2017 | 0.420 |
Norman rides around his home city of New York while visiting friends; eating pizza with Mario Batali; exploring the city's art, food and culture.

=== Season 3 (2019) ===
| No. overall | No. in season | Title | Original release date | U.S. viewers (millions) |
|---|---|---|---|---|
| 13 | 1 | "England: A Walking Dead Reunion" | February 11, 2019 | 0.415 |
In the season opener, Norman Reedus travels with Walking Dead co-star Jeffrey Dean Morgan on their second trip together. This time they meet up with fellow castmate Andrew Lincoln to ride around London. They discover centuries old landscapes and mystic monuments with British icon rock icon Ian Anderson, singer of Jethro Tull and Elspeth Beard, the first English woman to ride a motorcycle around the world.
| 14 | 2 | "Bay Area with Steven Yeun" | February 18, 2019 | 0.371 |
Norman invites former Walking Dead star Steven Yeun to travel the Bay Area of California. Their journey starts on the wharfs of San Francisco and the Golden Gate Bridge. Next, they head south to the countryside to meet up with bassist Les Claypool for the best seafood chowder. Then they go to Oakland to ride with a legendary motorcycle club, the East Bay Dragons.
| 15 | 3 | "Scotland with Melissa McBride" | February 25, 2019 | 0.426 |
Norman Reedus meets up with his Walking Dead co-star Melissa McBride to uncover her Scottish ancestry. With the weather too dangerous to ride motorcycles, the duo traverse rolling hills of Scotland in an SUV. They have afternoon tea, tartan shop and learn to play the bagpipes in Edinburgh. Make their way north to Stonehaven where they explore the medieval ruins of Dunnottar Castle. They end their journey in Nigg Bay where Melissa's relatives are from and then Aberdeen finding the memorial of William Wallace.
| 16 | 4 | "Valley of the Sun with Austin Amelio" | March 4, 2019 | 0.413 |
Norman Reedus and Austin Amelio explore the desert wasteland of Arizona on a heavy metal adventure to meet some of the country's bravest heroes.
| 17 | 5 | "Lone Star State with Sean Patrick Flanery" | March 11, 2019 | 0.474 |
Norman Reedus and Sean Patrick Flanery saddle up and ride through the heart of Texas to hang out with influential tattoo artist Oliver Peck in Dallas.
| 18 | 6 | "Tennessee: Music City with Marilyn Manson" | March 18, 2019 | 0.390 |
Norman Reedus embarks on a melodic expedition through Tennessee guided by a band of musicians who show him the heart and soul of the musical state.

=== Season 4 (2020) ===
| No. overall | No. in season | Title | Original release date | U.S. viewers (millions) |
|---|---|---|---|---|
| 19 | 1 | "Georgia with Michael Rooker" | March 8, 2020 | 0.317 |
The Dixon brothers explore the historic city of Birmingham Alabama, and have fun in Atlanta before arriving in Senoia for a Walking Dead reunion.
| 20 | 2 | "Japan with Ryan Hurst" | March 15, 2020 | 0.298 |
Norman Reedus and Ryan Hurst tour modern Japan and explore its technological history, ultimately arriving at the iconic and serene Mt. Fuji.
| 21 | 3 | "Japan with Milo Ventimiglia" | March 22, 2020 | 0.223 |
Norman Reedus and Milo Ventimiglia travel from Kyoto to Osaka Japan, taking in its cultural traditions and meeting some creative locals along the way.
| 22 | 4 | "Costa Rica with Dom Rocket" | March 29, 2020 | 0.336 |
Norman Reedus and Dom Rocket traverse the jungles and coasts of Costa Rica while doing some extreme riding, and exploring its natural beauty.
| 23 | 5 | "Uruguay with Becky Goebel" | April 5, 2020 | 0.323 |
Norman Reedus and Becky Goebel learn about the easygoing country of Uruguay while riding with locals to take in the rich culture it has to offer. This episode is dedicated to the late Peter Fonda who previously appeared in the first season finale.
| 24 | 6 | "Kentucky with Clifton Collins Jr." | April 12, 2020 | 0.198 |
Norman Reedus and Clifton Collins Jr. ride from Louisville to the Red River Gorge, while embracing the quintessential Kentucky experience.

=== Season 5 (2021) ===
| No. overall | No. in season | Title | Original release date | U.S. viewers (millions) |
|---|---|---|---|---|
| 25 | 1 | "The North Island of New Zealand with Josh Brolin" | March 7, 2021 | 0.161 |
Norman Reedus explores the harbor city of Auckland before meeting up with actor Josh Brolin; together they discover a rich native Maori culture and an affinity for motor sports amongst the stunning North Island landscape.
| 26 | 2 | "The South Island of New Zealand with Dylan McDermott" | March 14, 2021 | 0.202 |
Actor Dylan McDermott joins Norman Reedus for a scenic trip along New Zealand's majestic South Island; navigating dramatic mountain roads, they take in some of the most rugged, unpredictable landscape in a remote corner of the world.
| 27 | 3 | "Journey Down Norman's Memory Lane" | March 21, 2021 | 0.229 |
Norman Reedus looks back at his favorite moments from the previous four seasons, revisiting trips with Peter Fonda, Jeffrey Dean Morgan, Melissa McBride, and Dave Chappelle and remembering time spent in Japan, Costa Rica, Europe, and Uruguay.
| 28 | 4 | "America: Cross Country Adventure" | March 28, 2021 | 0.149 |
From the Pacific Coast Highway to the city of New York, Norman Reedus recalls his favorite experiences traveling America from coast to coast, on rides through the country with Steven Yeun, Austin Amelio, Sean Patrick Flanery, and Dave Chappelle.
| 29 | 5 | "Globetrotting on Two Wheels" | April 18, 2021 | 0.118 |
From his travels, Norman Reedus has discovered it's the people who make the journey; he looks back on those he's met and the lessons he's learned throughout the world with guests Jeffrey Dean Morgan, Melissa McBride, Ryan Hurst, and Milo Ventimiglia.
| 30 | 6 | "The Road Less Traveled: Behind the Scenes" | April 25, 2021 | N/A |
Norman Reedus joins the crew as they revisit their most unusual and surprising experiences on the road throughout the years, telling behind-the-scenes stories and pulling the curtains back to reveal what it took to get there.

=== Season 6 (2023) ===
| No. overall | No. in season | Title | Original release date | U.S. viewers (millions) |
|---|---|---|---|---|
| 31 | 1 | "The Utah Desert with Keanu Reeves" | September 10, 2023 | 0.275 |
| 32 | 2 | "Northern Italy with Josh Holloway" | September 17, 2023 | 0.207 |
| 33 | 3 | "The Eternal City with Johnny Knoxville" | September 24, 2023 | 0.215 |
| 34 | 4 | "Portugal: A Journey from Lisbon to Porto" | October 1, 2023 | 0.160 |

=== Season 7 (2025) ===
| No. overall | No. in season | Title | Original release date | U.S. viewers (millions) |
|---|---|---|---|---|
| 35 | 1 | "Walking Dead Country with Kim Coates" | September 14, 2025 | N/A |
Norman Reedus and actor Kim Coates reunite to ride through Georgia; together they reminisce about how far they've come in their careers and what it means to be part of The Walking Dead family.
| 36 | 2 | "Northern Georgia with Robert Patrick" | September 21, 2025 | N/A |
Norman Reedus and Robert Patrick ride through Georgia from Athens to Atlanta; together they learn about Georgia's musical history, and what it means to get a second chance in life.
| 37 | 3 | "New Mexico with Zahn McClarnon" | September 28, 2025 | N/A |
Norman Reedus and Zahn McClarnon travel through the artistic and unique parts of New Mexico; from Sante Fe to Hatch, they discover that weird is what's normal.

== In popular culture ==
- An advertisement for the show appears in the 2019 video game Death Stranding, whose main character is portrayed by Reedus, along with a special "Ride" branded bike with Reedus' character referencing the show while riding it.
