= Triumph Tiger Sport 800 =

Triumph motorcycle in Tiger range

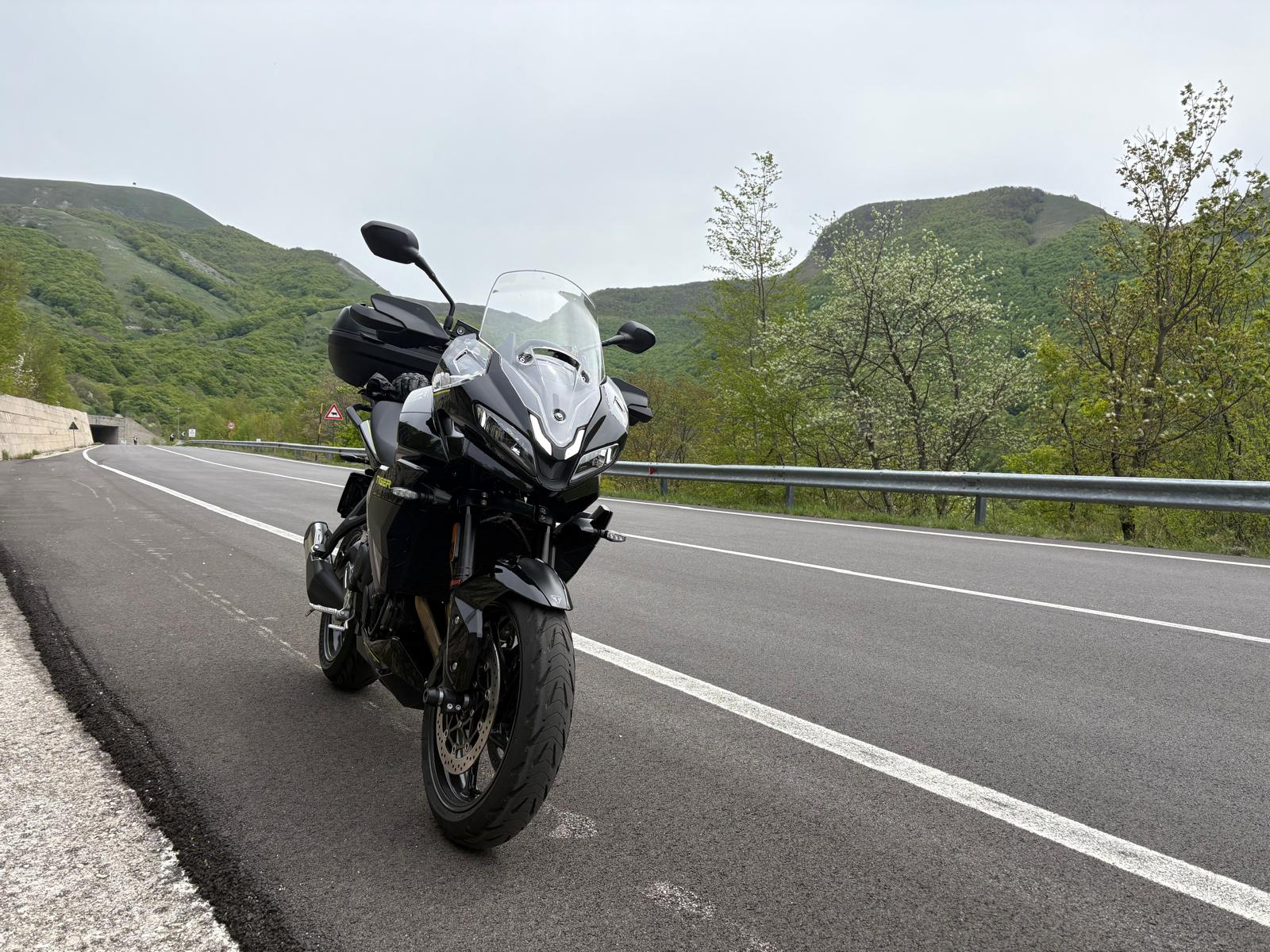
- Triumph Tiger Sport 800 parked on the road to Leonessa.
- Manufacturer: Triumph
- Production: 2025–present
- Predecessor: Tiger 850 Sport
- Class: Sport-tourer
- Engine: 798 cc (48.7 cu in); inline-three, DOHC, 12 valves, liquid-cooled
- Bore / stroke: 78.0 mm (3.07 in) × 55.7 mm (2.19 in)
- Compression ratio: 13.2:1
- Power: 113 bhp (84 kW) (115 PS (85 kW)) @ 10,750 rpm
- Torque: 84 N⋅m (62 lb⋅ft) @ 8,500 rpm
- Transmission: 6-speed gearbox; wet multi-plate assist clutch; X-ring chain final drive
- Frame type: Tubular steel perimeter frame
- Rake, trail: 23.8° / 99 mm (3.9 in)
- Wheelbase: 1,422 mm (56.0 in)
- Dimensions: L: 2,073 mm (81.6 in); W: 828 mm (32.6 in); H: 1,386 mm (54.6 in) / 1,303 mm (51.3 in)
- Seat height: 835 mm (32.9 in)
- Weight: 214 kg (472 lb) (claimed, in running order) (wet)
- Fuel capacity: 18.6 L (4.1 imp gal; 4.9 US gal)
- Related: Tiger

Triumph Tiger Sport 800 is a middle-weight sport touring motorcycle manufactured by Triumph since 2025. Combining a compact, high-revving 798 cc inline-three with a road-focused chassis and a modern electronics package (ride-by-wire), the Tiger Sport 800 is positioned as a sporty yet practical machine intended for both aggressive back-road riding and long-distance touring. The model was introduced as a road-focused successor to the Tiger 850 Sport and emphasises on-road dynamics over off-road capability.

== Design and development ==
Triumph developed the Tiger Sport 800 from the premise of delivering a compact, mass-centralised sport-tourer that would be more oriented to tarmac performance than the more adventure-oriented Tigers. Key development goals were mass centralisation, chassis agility, consistent midrange engine performance, rider comfort during long rides, and a modern electronics set to enhance safety and versatility. The resulting machine shares some architectural elements with the Tiger Sport 660 (steel perimeter frame and compact packaging) but uses a bespoke 798 cc triple and revised geometry for sharper handling.

== Engine and performance ==
The Tiger Sport 800 is powered by a short-stroke, liquid-cooled inline-three (78.0 millimetres (3.07 in) × 55.7 millimetres (2.19 in)) with DOHC and 12 valves. Claimed output is 115 PS (113 bhp / 84.6 kW) at 10,750 rpm and 84 N·m (61.9 lb·ft) at 8,500 rpm. The engine features sequential multipoint electronic fuel injection and ride-by-wire throttle, permitting selectable ride modes and refined throttle mapping.

Reviews highlight the triple’s flexible delivery — lively midrange with a willing top end — and its characteristic three-cylinder exhaust note. First-ride tests praise the engine’s tractability for both spirited canyon work and relaxed long-distance cruising.

== Chassis, suspension and brakes ==
The Tiger Sport 800 uses a tubular steel perimeter frame and a relatively short wheelbase (1,422 mm) for its category, aiding quick direction changes and nimble handling. Showa supplies the suspension: a 41 mm separate-function inverted fork with adjustable compression and rebound at the front and a Showa monoshock with hydraulic remote preload and rebound adjustment at the rear; both ends provide approximately 150 mm of travel and are tuned for a balance of mid-corner composure and touring comfort.

Stopping is provided by twin 310 mm front discs with radial-mounted four-piston calipers and a single 255 mm rear disc. A six-axis inertial measurement unit (IMU) enables lean-sensitive ABS and traction control. Many trims include a bi-directional quickshifter and cruise control.

== Electronics and rider aids ==
The electronics suite centres on a six-axis IMU and ride-by-wire. Standard and available features include:

- Multiple ride modes (Road, Sport and Rain) that alter throttle mapping and traction control sensitivity.
- Lean-sensitive ABS and traction control via the IMU.
- Full LED lighting with daytime running lights and a TFT instrument display with smartphone connectivity on higher trims.
- Available aids on higher-spec models include a bi-directional quickshifter and cruise control.

== Public Reception ==
Contemporary reviews have been broadly positive, praising the Tiger Sport 800’s combination of agility and long-distance comfort. Motorcycle.com highlighted its “cat-like reflexes” and versatility, while Rider magazine described it as an “exceptional” balance of agility, comfort, technology and performance. Cycle News emphasised the bike’s sporty handling and the triple’s character.

== See also ==
- Triumph Tiger
- Sport touring motorcycle
