= Elspeth Beard =

British architect and motorcyclist

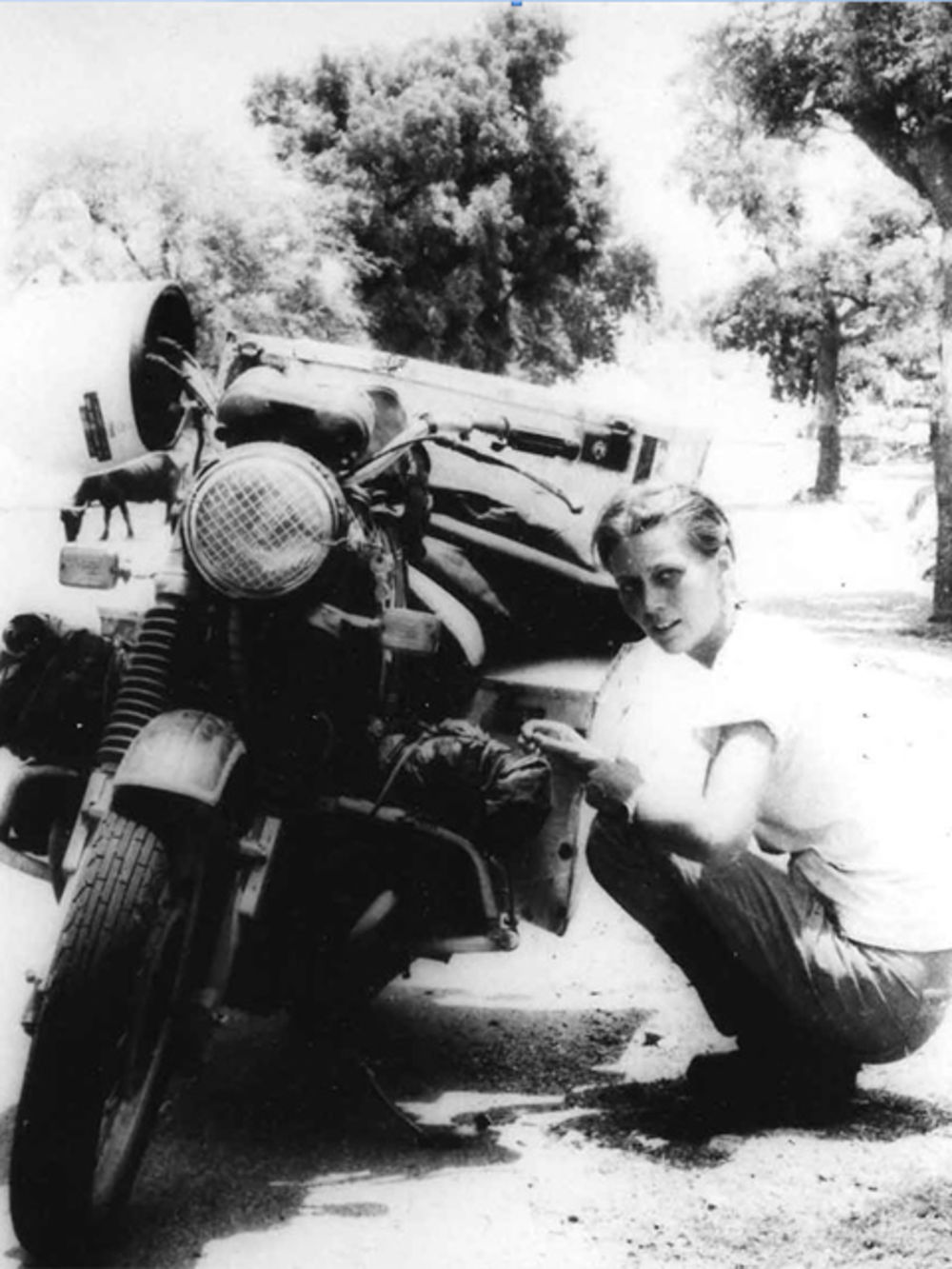
- Born: 28 April 1959 (age 67)
- Occupation: Architect
- Children: 1
- Awards: Royal Institute of British Architects Award
- Practice: Elspeth Beard Architects
- Projects: The first Englishwoman to ride a motorcycle around the world
- Design: Munstead Tower
- Website: https://www.elspethbeard.com/

Elspeth Beard (born 28 April 1959) is an architect and motorcyclist, noted for being one of the first Englishwomen to ride a motorcycle around the world. (Note: Some sources say she was the first British woman to ride a motorcycle around the world.) She later redesigned the historic Munstead Tower in Godalming, winning the 1994 Royal Institute of British Architects award for South East England. She now owns an architectural firm based in a converted stable in Godalming.

== Personal life ==
Beard currently runs the Elspeth Beard Architects practice in Godalming. She received her pilot's licence in 1991. She has never married. She has a son.

== Motorcycling ==
Beard learned to ride a motorcycle on Salisbury Plain at the age of 16. She began her global journey in 1982, after the third year of her architect training course, using a BMW R60/6 motorcycle. She added soft panniers, a tank bag and an extra bag lashed to the pillion seat before she embarked on the trip. She began her journey in New York City, United States, having shipped the bike from the United Kingdom. From there, she motorcycled to Canada and Mexico and back to the US before shipping her bike to Sydney, Australia.

In Sydney, Beard ran out of money and spent seven months working in a pub before motorcycling across Australia. In Townsville, Queensland, she had an accident which left her hospitalised for two weeks. Afterwards, she travelled to Singapore, where she spent 6 weeks replacing important documents and gear after they were all stolen; then she travelled into Asia. In Thailand, she collided with a dog and recuperated with a local family who fed her the remains of the dog she had crashed into. At the time of the assassination of Prime Minister Indira Gandhi, the entire Punjab state was closed. Beard forged the necessary permit to get out of the Punjab region and travelled into Pakistan before riding back into Europe via Turkey. She arrived in the United Kingdom in 1984, having travelled 35,000 miles (56,000 km). In doing so, she became the first Englishwoman to motorcycle around the world.

When Beard returned from the trip, there was a lack of interest in what she had accomplished, as she stated in an interview: "After I got back and nobody was interested in what I'd done, I just shoved everything into the back of the garage. I just kind of moved on with my life."

Beard's 2017 autobiography Lone Rider chronicles the circumnavigation.

== Munstead Tower ==
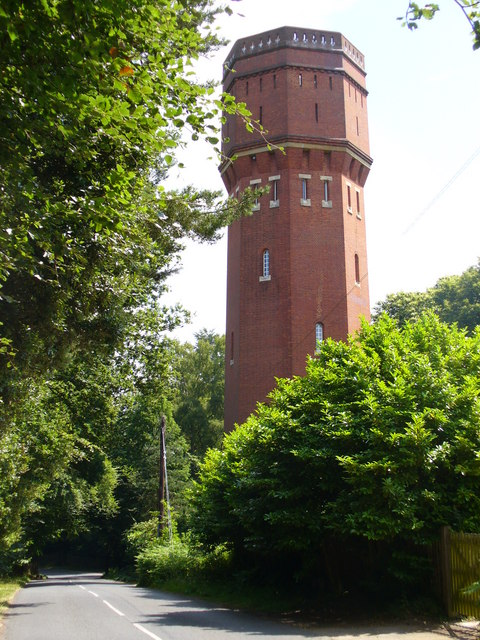

After her motorcycling feat, Beard bought the derelict Munstead Tower in Godalming, a 130-foot (40 m) former water tower built in 1898. Over five years, she renovated and converted it into a habitable house. The renovated tower was featured on a 1995 episode of Home Front, and in 1994, the tower won the Royal Institute of British Architects award for South East England. In 2019, Beard and the tower were featured in the Season 3 episode 1 of Ride with Norman Reedus. The principal bedroom of the tower also featured in the 2022 film Rogue Agent.

== Publications ==
- Lone Rider: The First British Woman to Motorcycle Around the World, Autobiography, 2017, ISBN 9781782438045
- Sola, en moto, La Mala Suerte Ediciones, 2020, ISBN 9788412143638 Spanish translation.
- Sola, in moto, La Mala Suerte Ediciones, 2021, ISBN 9788412143669 Italian translation.
