= Triumph Tiger =

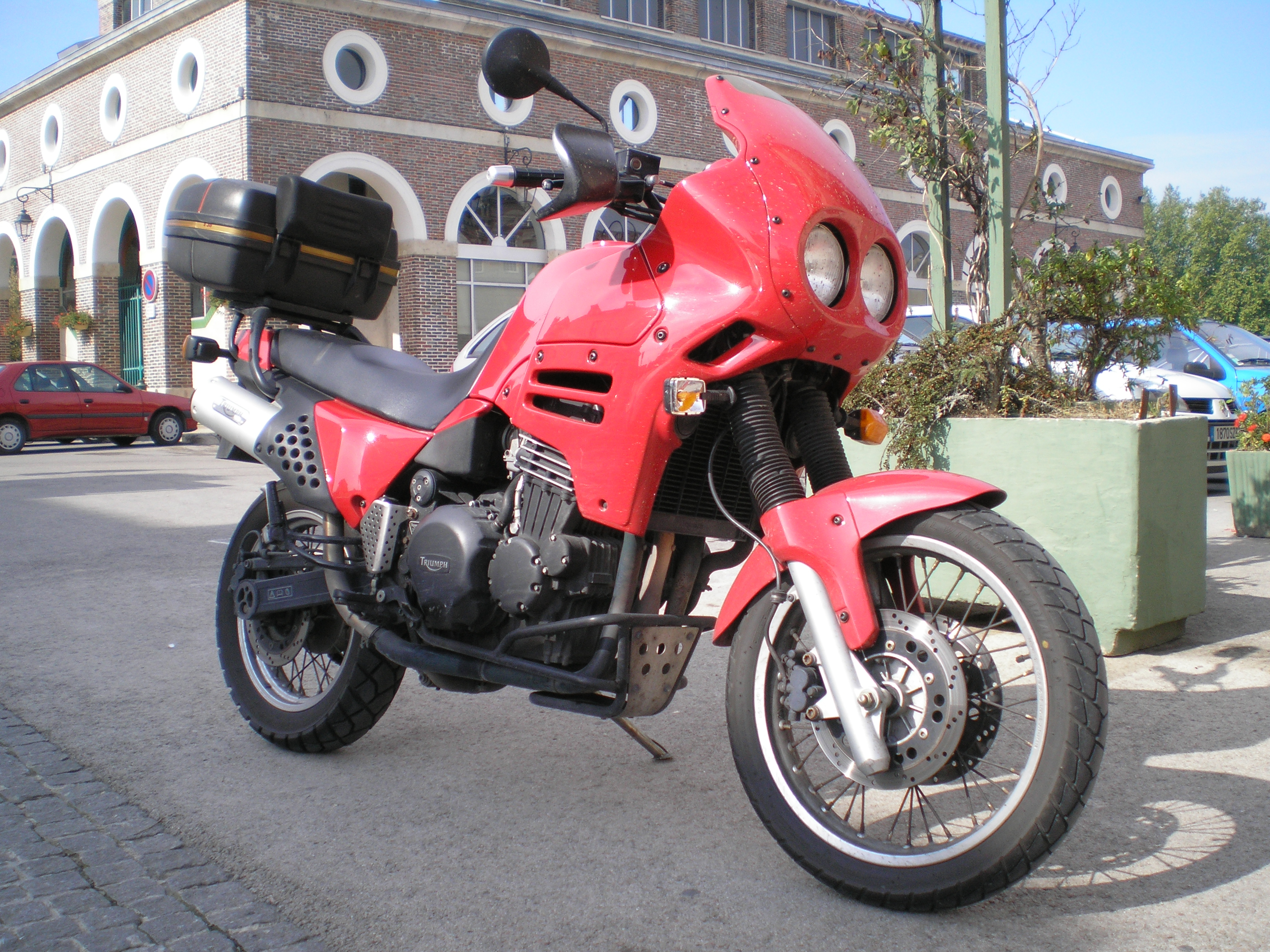
A Triumph Tiger 900 (T400)

Triumph Tiger is a name used by a number of former motorcycles historically made by the British company Triumph Engineering and more-recent models by its modern successor, Triumph Motorcycles Ltd.

== Current models ==
- Triumph Tiger Sport 660, produced since 2022
- Triumph Tiger Sport 800, produced since 2025
- Triumph Tiger 900 (2020), produced since 2020
- Triumph Tiger Explorer (1200), produced since 2012

== Previous models made by Triumph Motorcycles Ltd since 1993 ==
- Triumph Tiger 800, produced since 2010
- Triumph Tiger 1050, produced since 2007
- Triumph Tiger 900 (T400), produced between 1993 and 1998
- Triumph Tiger 955i, produced between 2001 and 2006

== Earlier models made by Triumph Engineering prior to 1982 ==
- Triumph Tiger 80, produced between 1937 and 1939
- Triumph Tiger 100, produced between 1939 and 1940; and between 1946 and 1973
- Triumph Tiger T110, produced between 1953 and 1961
- Triumph Tiger Cub, produced between 1956 and 1968
- Triumph Tiger Daytona, produced between 1967 and 1974
- Triumph TR7 Tiger, produced between 1973 and 1980
- Triumph Tiger Trail, produced between 1981 and 1982
