= Oystering =

Type of decorative veneer

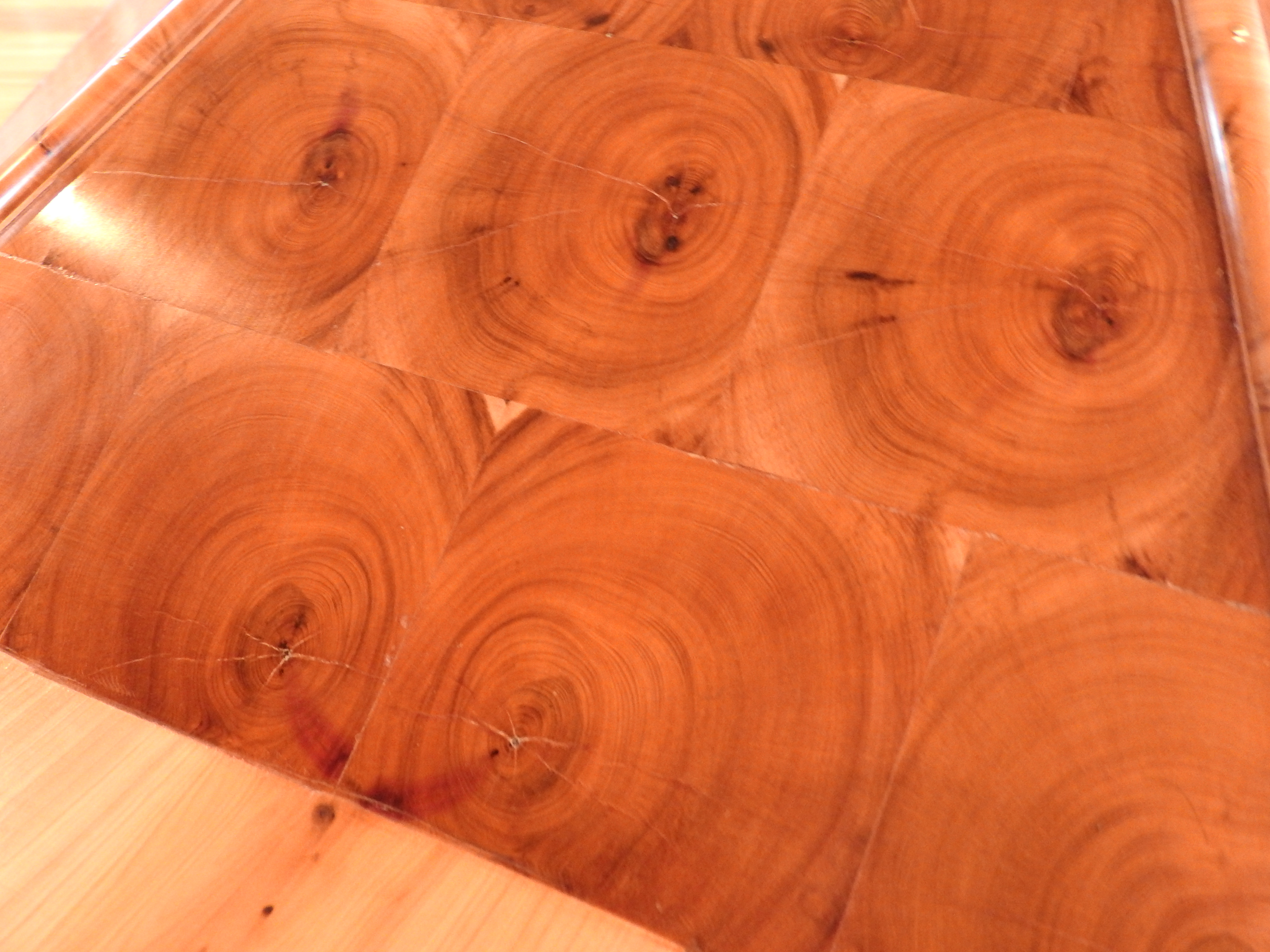
The oyster-like effect of yew wood cut across the grain

Oystering or oyster veneer is a decorative form of veneering, a type of parquetry. This technique is using thin slices of wood branches or roots cut in cross-section, usually from small branches of walnut, olive, kingwood and less commonly laburnum, yew and cocus. The resulting circular or oval pieces of veneer are laid side by side in furniture to produce various decorative patterns. Because the shape formed resembles an oyster shell the technique acquired the name of oyster veneering.

== History ==
This technique is likely to have been developed by English cabinet-makers in the 1660s, immediately after the Restoration of the monarchy, first being used on furniture such as the cocuswood cabinet on stand which bears the cipher of Queen Henrietta Maria, constructed in c.1661-65, and now at Windsor Castle. Early oyster veneered cabinets were invariably in cocus or kingwood. Contemporary longcase clock cases were similarly veneered.

By around the early 1670s softer and more cheaply available woods such as olive and walnut began to be used for oyster veneering, the fashion for such furniture becoming widespread and also spreading to Holland by around the mid-1670s. Oyster veneering fell out of fashion from c.1710. The chest illustrated here, if it is not a later reproduction, therefore appears to be an unusually late example.

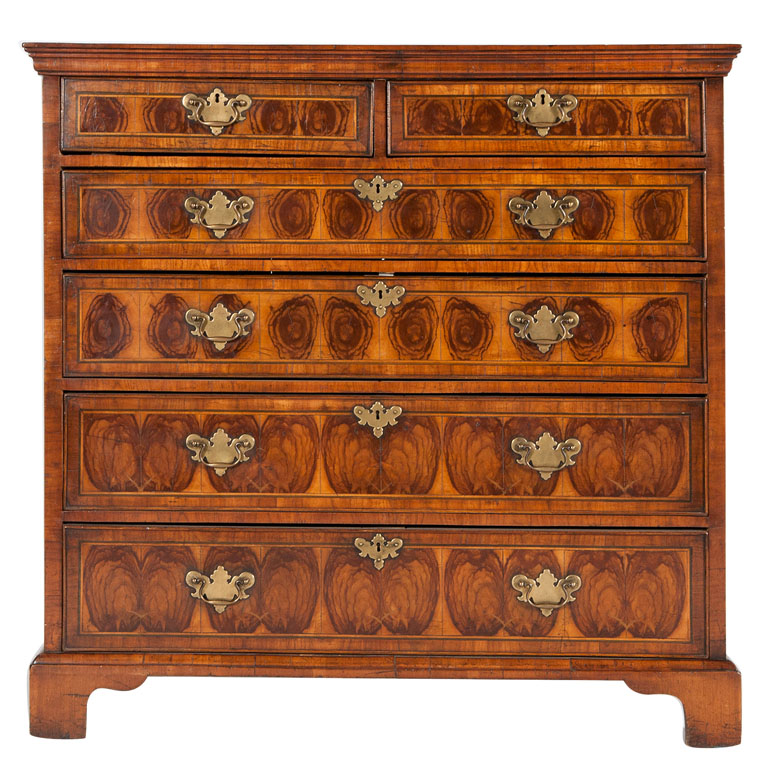
Chest Of Drawers, age of George I

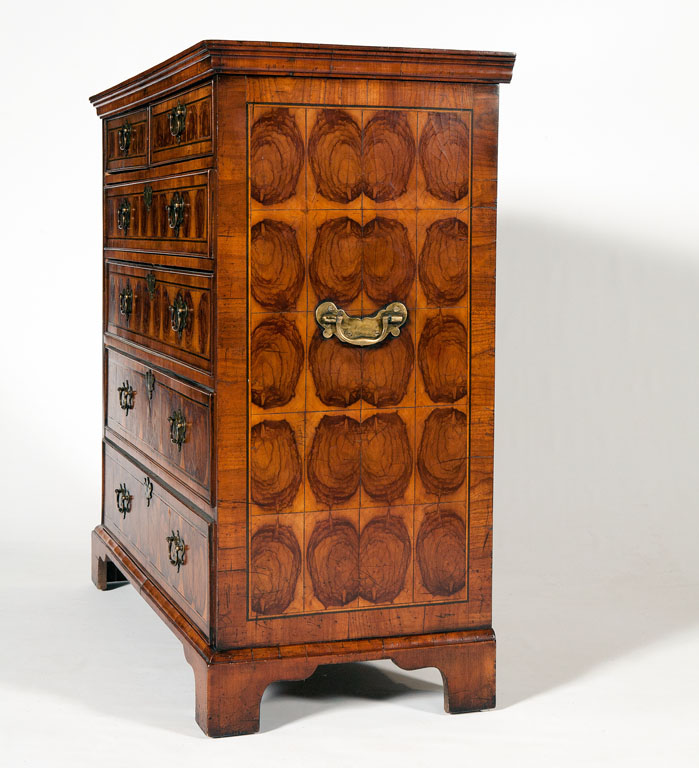
End of same chest

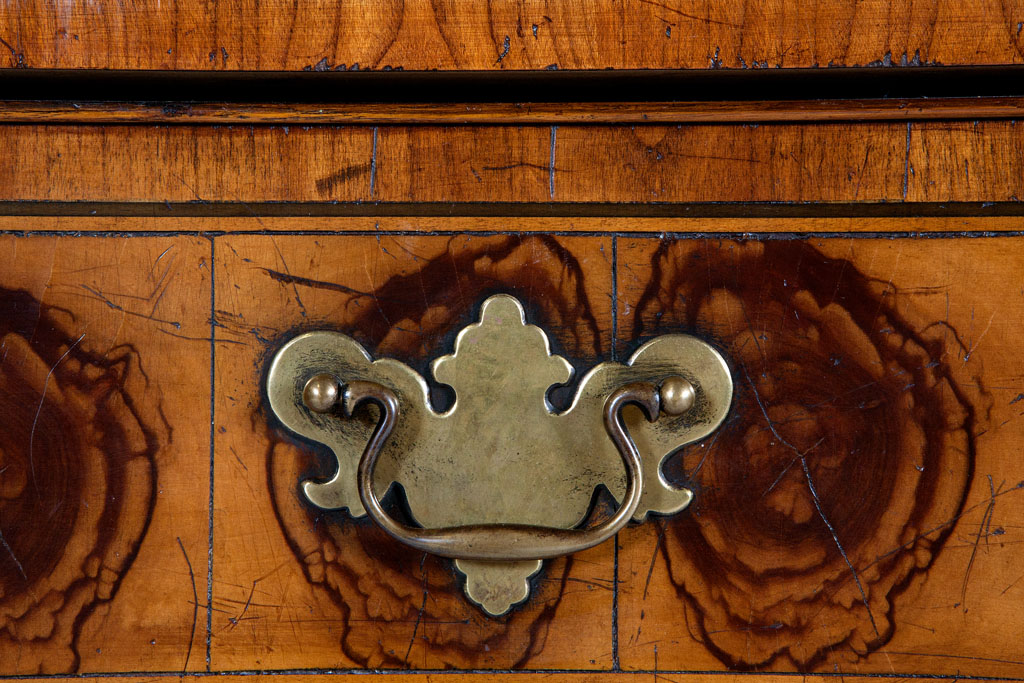
Detail of the chest

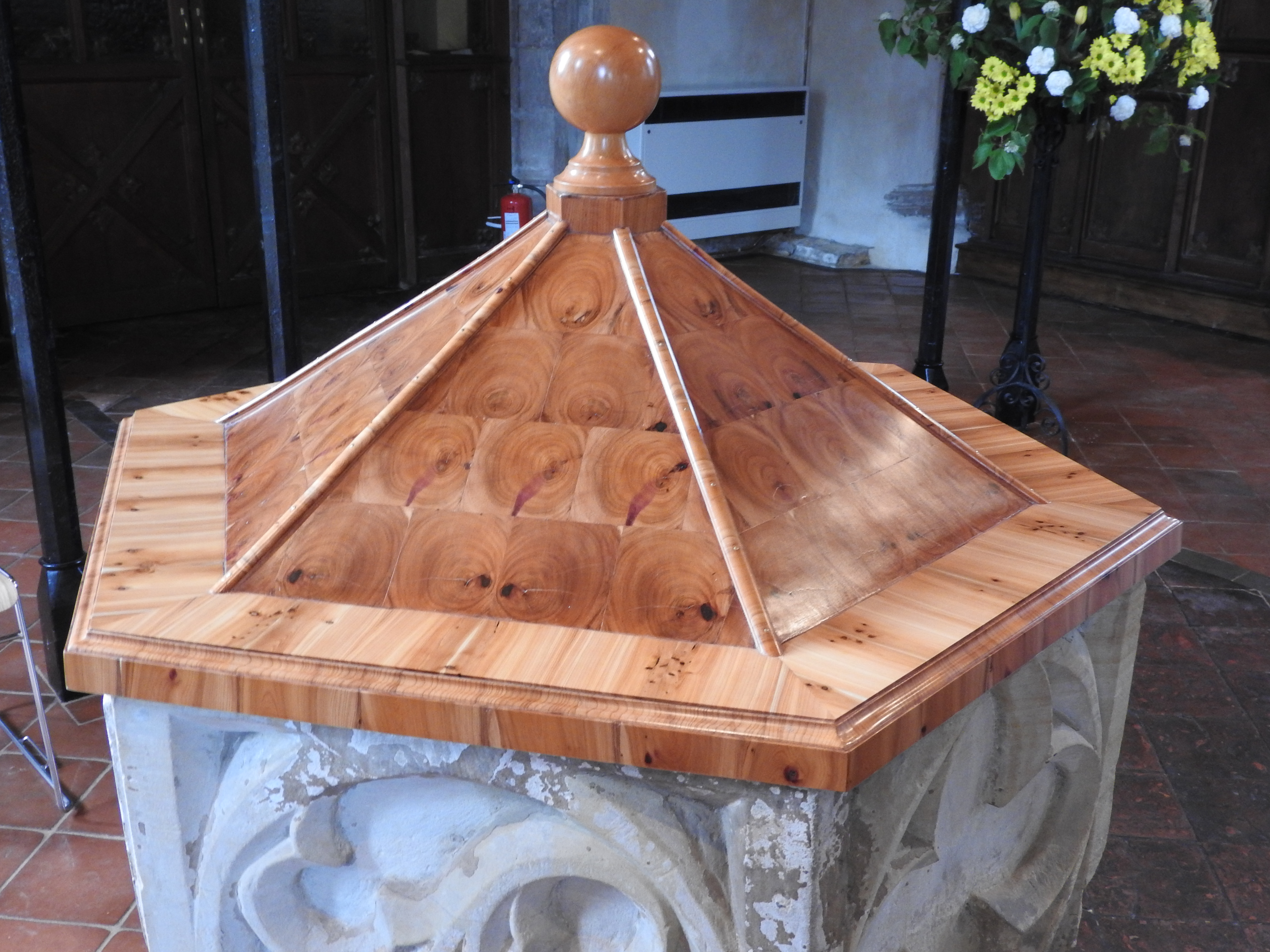
A commission from 2017, A baptismal font cover in Rolvenden, Kent.
