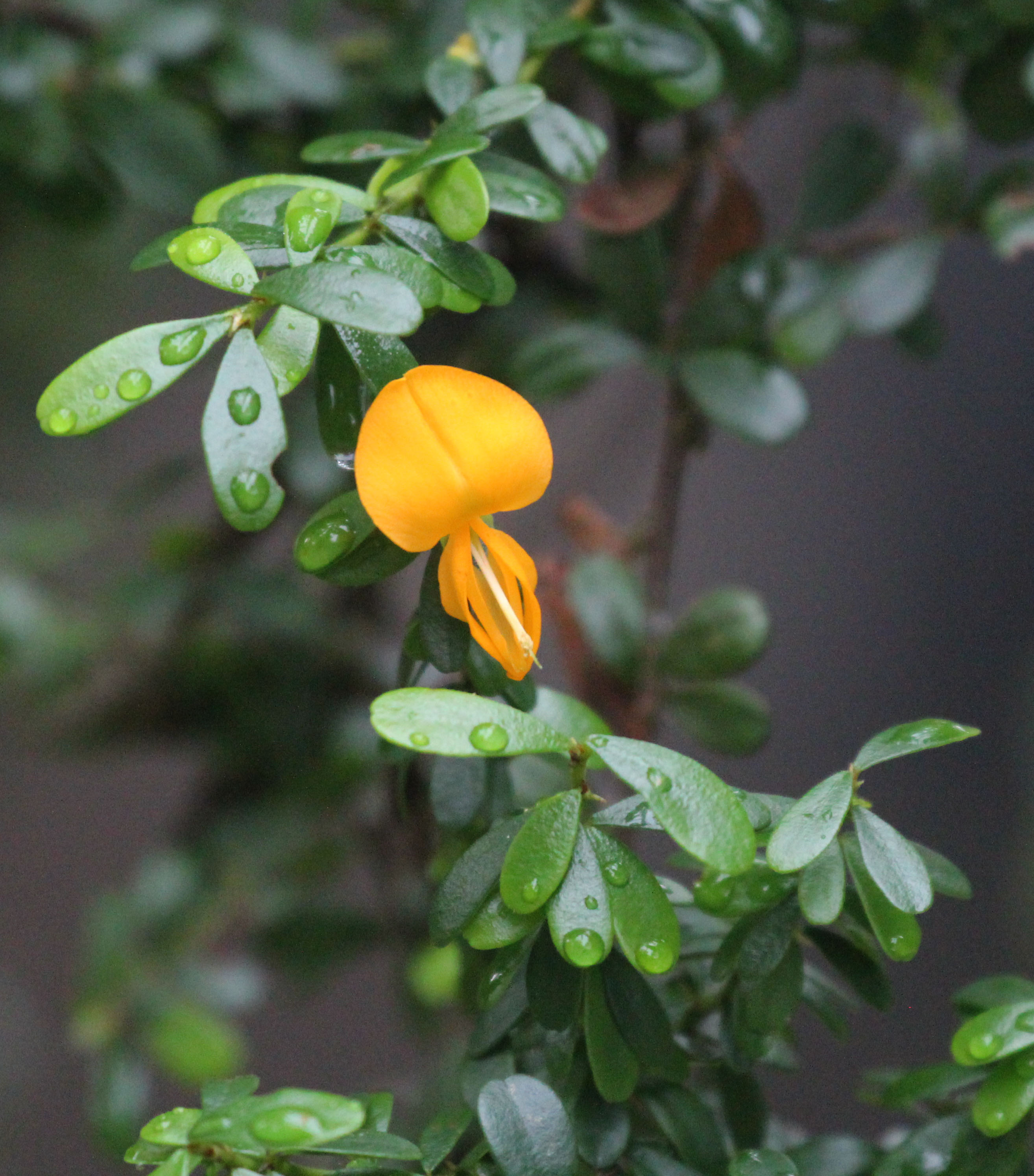
- Brya ebenus

Scientific classification
- Kingdom: Plantae
- Clade: Tracheophytes
- Clade: Angiosperms
- Clade: Eudicots
- Clade: Rosids
- Order: Fabales
- Family: Fabaceae
- Subfamily: Faboideae
- Tribe: Dalbergieae
- Genus: Brya; P.Browne (1756)

Species
- Brya buxifolia (Murray) Urb.; Brya chrysogonii León & Alain; Brya depressa Borhidi & A.Barreto; Brya ebenus (L.) DC.; Brya hirsuta Borhidi; Brya microphylla Bisse; Brya subinermis León & Alain

Synonyms
- Nefrakis Raf. (1838)

= Brya =

Genus of legumes

Brya is a genus of flowering plants in the legume family, Fabaceae. It includes seven species of shrubs or small spreading trees native to Cuba and Hispaniola in the Caribbean. It belongs to the subfamily Faboideae, and was recently assigned to the informal monophyletic Pterocarpus clade of the Dalbergieae. Species include Brya ebenus, a valuable timber tree.

Typical habitats include seasonally dry tropical forest and shrubland.

== Species ==
Seven species are accepted:

- Brya buxifolia (Murray) Urb. – eastern Cuba and Hispaniola
- Brya chrysogonii León & Alain – southeastern Cuba
- Brya depressa Borhidi & A.Barreto – Cuba
- Brya ebenus (L.) DC. – Cuba
- Brya hirsuta Borhidi – Cuba
- Brya microphylla Bisse – Cuba
- Brya subinermis León & Alain – Cuba (Sierra de Moa)
