= Triumph Tiger Sport 660 =

British motorcycle

- 2026 Triumph Tiger Sport 660
- Manufacturer: Triumph Motorcycles
- Production: 2022–present
- Class: Sport touring motorcycle
- Engine: Water-cooled, 660 cc (40 cu in), DOHC, triple
- Bore / stroke: 74 mm × 51.1 mm (2.91 in × 2.01 in)
- Compression ratio: 11.95:1
- Power: 81 PS (60 kW) @ 10,250 rpm (claimed)
- Torque: 47 ft⋅lb (64 N⋅m) @ 6,250 rpm (claimed)
- Transmission: wet clutch, 6-speed, chain
- Frame type: Steel perimeter
- Suspension: Front Showa 41 mm USD telescopic separate function fork (SFF); Rear Showa monoshock with preload adjustment
- Brakes: Nissin two-piston sliding calipers, twin 310mm discs Nissin single-piston sliding caliper, single 255 mm disc
- Tyres: 120/70 ZR 17 Michelin Road 5 (front); 180/55 ZR 17 Michelin Road 5 (rear)
- Rake, trail: 23.1 ° / 97.1 mm (3.82 in)
- Wheelbase: 1,418 mm (55.8 in)
- Seat height: 835 mm (32.9 in)
- Weight: 206 kg (454 lb) (wet)
- Fuel capacity: 17.2 L (3.8 imp gal; 4.5 US gal)

The Triumph Tiger Sport 660 is a middle-weight Sport touring motorcycle launched in 2022 by British manufacturer Triumph Motorcycles Ltd and using many of the components of its naked sibling, the Triumph Trident 660.

== Features ==
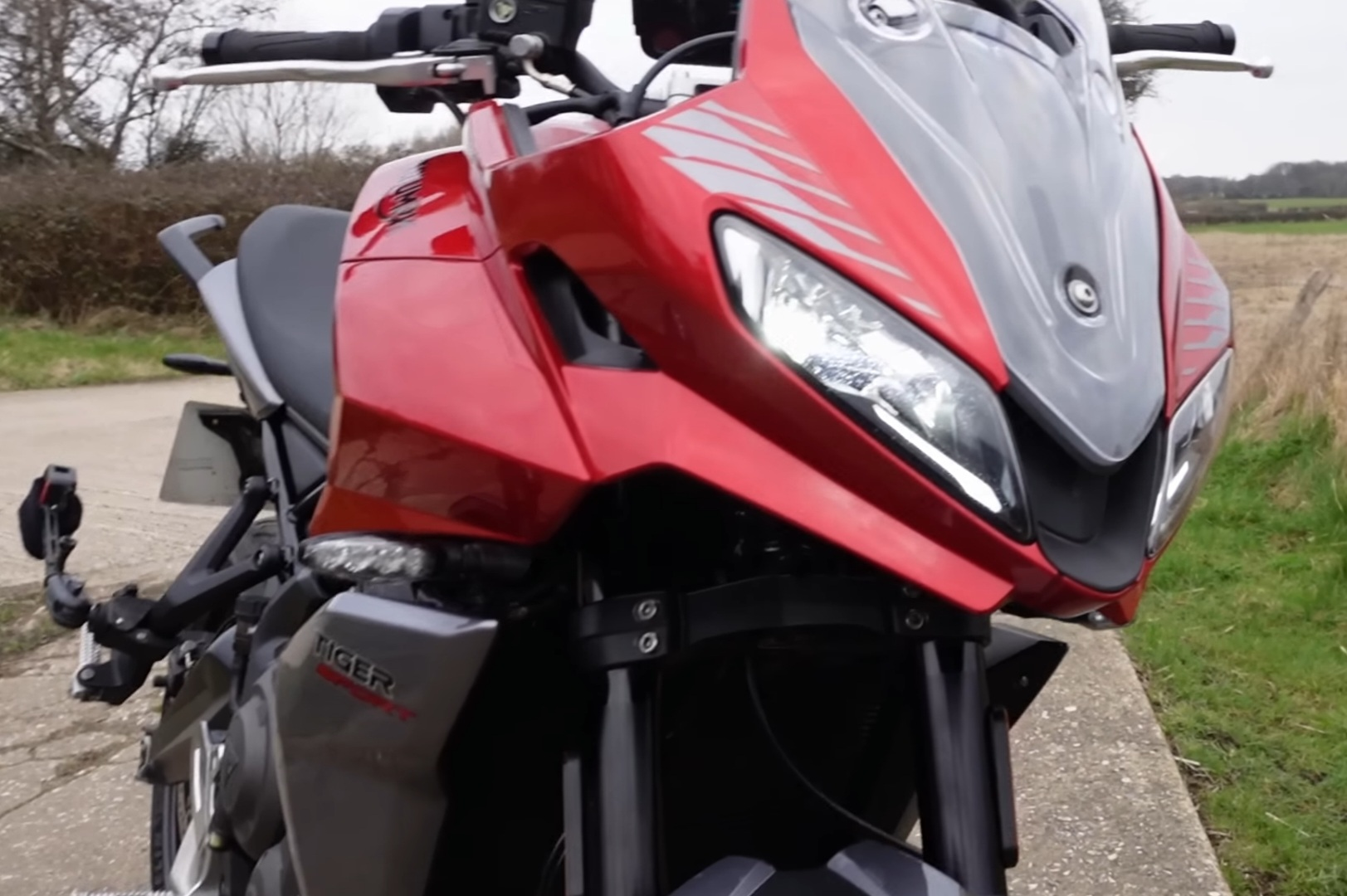
Front details

The motorcycle features:

- Riding modes (rain/road)
- Switchable traction control
- Non-switchable anti-lock brakes
- Hybrid LCD/TFT instrument pod
- Full LED lighting
- Remote preload adjustment for the rear shocks
- Optional quickshifter and autoblipper
- A2 Licence restrictor kit
- LAMS Restricted (39 kW) model for Australia / New Zealand market
- Adjustable windshield

An optional Bluetooth connectivity system is available, which allows mobile phone connection, navigation, music control, and GoPro control. This system is driven by the My Triumph app, and available for both Android and Apple iOS.
