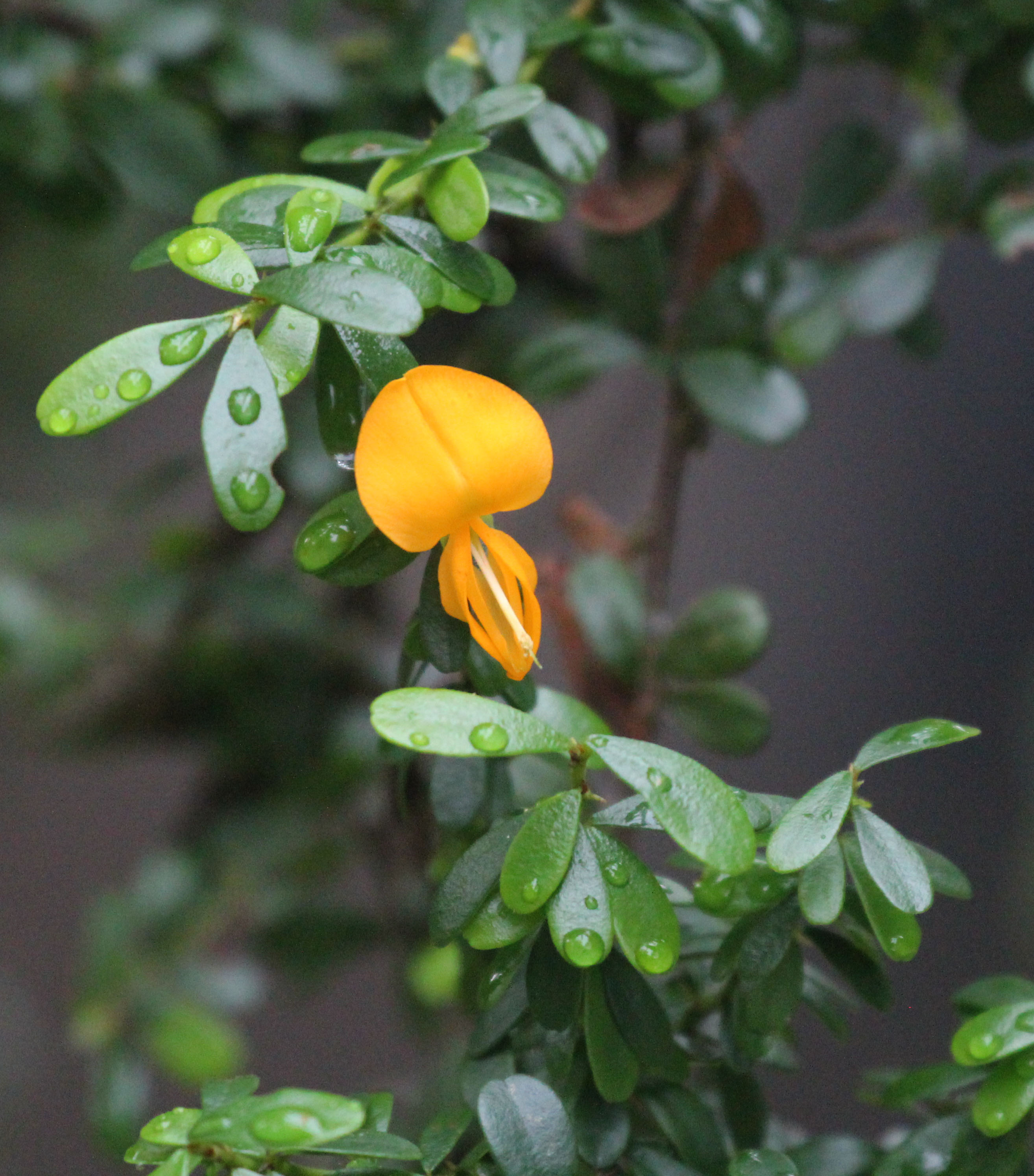

Scientific classification
- Kingdom: Plantae
- Clade: Tracheophytes
- Clade: Angiosperms
- Clade: Eudicots
- Clade: Rosids
- Order: Fabales
- Family: Fabaceae
- Subfamily: Faboideae
- Genus: Brya
- Species: B. ebenus

Binomial name
- Brya ebenus (L.) DC.

Synonyms
- Aspalathus ebenus L.

= Brya ebenus =

Species of legume

Brya ebenus, the Jamaican raintree, espino de sabana, granadillo, cocus wood, cocuswood, and coccuswood, is a species of plant in the pea family, Fabaceae. It is native to Cuba, and it has been introduced to Jamaica. Horticulturally it is known as the Jamaica(n) rain tree.

== Description ==
The Jamaican rain tree is a small drought-resistant tree that can grow around 20–30 feet tall and produces long, drooping branches. It has small, waxy 2-3 parted compound leaves that often appear to be simple. The leaves are densely borne in alternate formation on short spurs that are produced on the main stems. The bright yellow flowers develop on short indeterminate (racemose) inflorescences. They are typically (for the subfamily Faboideae) pea-like and hermaphroditic, with bilateral symmetry and (not so typically) heterostyly. The fruits are legumes, which are common for the family Fabaceae.

== Ecology ==
Brya ebenus grows in scrublands (tropical terrestrial biome), needs full sunlight and flowers sporadically throughout the year. As its common name suggests, the Jamaican rain tree is well known to come into bloom almost immediately after a rain event. This is may be an adaptation to produce seeds quickly when unpredictable rains occur. The flowers attract insect visitors such as bees. As in many Faboideae, the Jamaican rain tree has bacterial nodules in its roots, which fix atmospheric nitrogen into a usable form, allowing growth in poor soils.

== Cultivation and uses ==
Brya ebenus is cultivated as an ornamental, for bonsai trees, and for its valuable wood. Cocus wood is a very dense tropical hardwood with excellent musical tone quality, and was used for making flutes in England and France especially during the 19th century. It is still occasionally used for wooden musical instruments such as bagpipes, clarinets, oboes, and piccolos.

The branches of Brya ebenus were used as whips for slaves.
