= Triumph Trident 660 =

British motorcycle

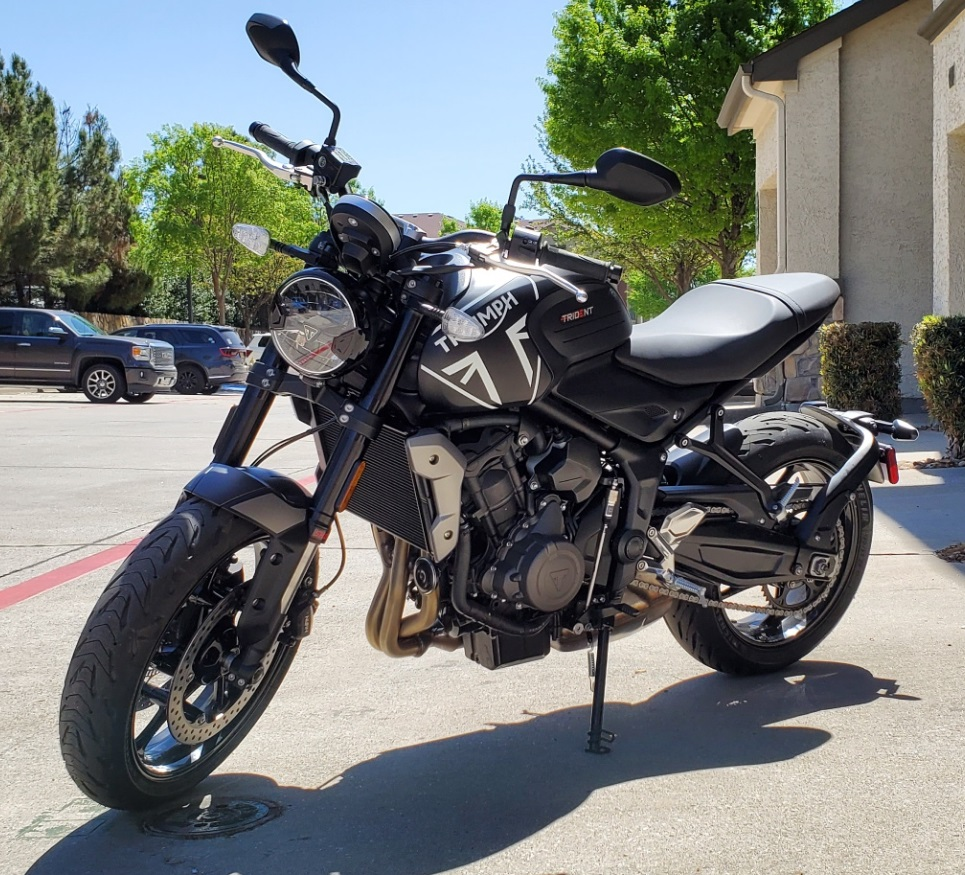
- Triumph Trident 660
- Manufacturer: Triumph Motorcycles
- Production: 2020
- Class: naked
- Engine: Water-cooled, 660 cc (40 cu in), DOHC, triple
- Bore / stroke: 74 mm × 51.1 mm (2.91 in × 2.01 in)
- Compression ratio: 11.95:1
- Power: 81 PS (60 kW) @ 10,250 rpm (claimed)
- Torque: 47 ft⋅lb (64 N⋅m) @ 6,250 rpm (claimed)
- Transmission: wet clutch, 6-speed, chain
- Frame type: Steel perimeter
- Suspension: Front Showa 41mm USD telescopic separate function fork (SFF); Rear Showa monoshock with preload adjustment
- Brakes: Nissin two-piston sliding calipers, twin 310mm discs Nissin single-piston sliding caliper, single 255mm disc
- Tyres: 120/70 ZR 17 Michelin Road 5 (front); 180/55 ZR 17 Michelin Road 5 (rear)
- Rake, trail: 24.6 ° / 107.3 mm (4.22 in)
- Wheelbase: 1,401 mm (55.2 in)
- Seat height: 805 mm (31.7 in)
- Weight: 189 kg (417 lb) (wet)
- Fuel capacity: 14 L (3.1 imp gal; 3.7 US gal)

The Triumph Trident 660 is a naked motorcycle by manufacturer Triumph Motorcycles Ltd. Following a four-year development programme, the Triumph Trident prototype was revealed at the London Design Museum on 25 August 2020. To disguise the final form, the prototype was painted all white with the exception of the engine. A further, less-disguised and fully running prototype was released to the press a few weeks later, and shows the motorcycle undergoing final testing.

Finally, the production version of the Trident was released to the press and journalists on 30 October 2020.

The Trident is intended to compete in the middleweight sector, and be a rival to the likes of the Yamaha MT-07, Kawasaki Z650, Honda CB650R, and to a lesser extent the Suzuki SV650.

== Features ==
Unlike the Street Triple S, the engine of which was developed to power the new motorcycle, the Trident has an all-new steel perimeter frame.

The motorcycle features:

- Riding modes (rain/road)
- Switchable traction control
- Non-switchable anti-lock brakes
- Hybrid LCD/TFT instrument pod
- Full LED lighting
- Optional quickshifter and autoblipper
- A2 Licence restrictor kit
- LAMS Restricted (39 kW) model for Australia / New Zealand market

An optional Bluetooth connectivity system is available, which allows mobile phone connection, navigation, music control, and GoPro control. This system is driven by the My Triumph app, and available for both Android and Apple iOS.

== Engine ==
The Trident 660 engine is an updated Triumph Daytona 675 engine with a slightly shorter stroke, down from 52.3 mm to 51.1 mm. The engine has 67 new components, including crank, pistons, gudgeon pins, cylinder liners, cylinder head, cams, crankcase castings, sump, cooling system, radiator, alternator rotor and stator, air intakes, exhaust and slip and assist clutch for a light lever action.

== History ==
BSA Rocket 3/Triumph Trident

Trident 750/900
