= List of DC Comics publications (G–J) =

DC Comics is one of the largest comic book publishers in North America. DC has published comic books under a number of different imprints and corporate names. This is a list of all series, mini-series, limited series, one-shots and graphic novels published under the imprints DC or AA, and published by National Periodical Publications, National Comics Publications, All-American Comics, Inc., National Allied Publications, Detective Comics, Inc., and related corporate names, as well as imprints publishing titles directly related to the DC Universe characters and continuity, such as Elseworlds and DC Black Label. The list does not include collected editions; trade paperbacks; digital comics; free, promotional giveaways; or magazines, nor does it include series from imprints mainly publishing titles that are separate from the DC Universe continuity, such as Vertigo or WildStorm; series published under those imprints that are related to the DC Universe continuity are noted, but not listed.

While generally the most recognizable name of a comic is printed on the cover, the cover title can be changed for a number of reasons. For example, Action Comics has frequently been listed as Action Comics featuring Superman or Superman in Action Comics, or even on occasion Supergirl in Action Comics. The official name, however, is found in the indicia, in small print inside the comics.

- List of DC Comics publications (A–B)
- List of DC Comics publications (C–F)
- List of DC Comics publications (K–O)
- List of DC Comics publications (P–S)
- List of DC Comics publications (T–Z)

== G ==
Title	Series	Issues	Dates	Notes	Reference
G.I. Combat	vol. 1	#44–288	Jan 1957 – Mar 1987	Prior issues published by Quality Comics	
G.I. Combat	vol. 2	#0–7	Jul 2012 – Feb 2013	Issue #0 was published between #4 and #5	
G.I. Combat (War One-Shot)		#1	Nov 2010	One-shot; also known as G. I. Combat Featuring Haunted Tank	
G.I. War Tales		#1–4	Mar/Apr 1973 – Oct/Nov 1973		
Galaxy: As the World Falls Down			2026	Graphic novel	
Galaxy: The Prettiest Star			2022	Graphic novel	
Gammarauders		#1–10	Jan 1989 – Dec 1989		
Gang Busters		#1–67	Dec/Jan 1947/1948 – Dec/Jan 1958/1959		
Gangs of Gotham		#1–	Jan 2027 – present		
GCPD: The Blue Wall		#1–6	Dec 2022 – May 2023	Limited series	
Gears of War		#16–24	Apr 2011 – Aug 2012	Issues #1–15 published under the WildStorm imprint	
gen:LOCK		#1–7	Jan 2020 – Oct 2020	Limited series; print release of issues #6 & 7 canceled due to COVID-19 pandemic, though later included in trade paperback collection	
Generation Hex		#1	Jun 1997	One-shot; published under the Amalgam Comics imprint in association with Marvel	
Generations Forged		#1	Apr 2021	One-shot	
Generations Shattered		#1	Mar 2021	One-shot	
Genesis		#1–4	Oct 1997	Weekly limited series	
Ghost/Batgirl: The Resurrection Machine		#1–4	Aug 2000 – Dec 2000	Limited series; co-published with Dark Horse Comics	
Ghosts		#1–112	Sep/Oct 1971 – May 1982		
Giantkiller		#1–6	Aug 1999 – Jan 2000	Limited series	
Giantkiller A To Z: A Field Guide To Big Monsters			Aug 1999	One-shot	
Giant-Size Atom		#1	May 2011	One-shot	
Gilgamesh II		#1–4	Feb 1989 – Jun 1989	Limited series	
Girl Taking Over: A Lois Lane Story			2023	Graphic novel	
GirlFrenzy!			Jun 1998	Fifth-week event series of one-shots; individual issues are listed separately	
Girls' Love Stories		#1–180	Aug/Sep 1949 – Nov/Dec 1973		
Girls' Romances		#1–160	Feb/Mar 1950 – Oct 1971		
G'nort's Illustrated Swimsuit Edition		#1	Oct 2023	One-shot	
God of War		#6	Jan 2011	Final issue of a limited series. Prior issues were published by WildStorm. DC published a collected edition with all six issues in March 2011.	
Gog (Villains)		#1	Feb 1998	One-shot; part of the New Year's Evil series	
The Golden Age		#1–4	Summer 1993 – Spring 1994	Elseworlds limited series	
Golden Age Secret Files and Origins		#1	Feb 2001	One-shot	
Gotham Academy		#1–18	Dec 2014 – Jul 2016		
Gotham Academy		Annual #1	Oct 2016		
Gotham Academy	Endgame	#1	May 2015	One-shot	
Gotham Academy	Second Semester	#1–12	Nov 2016 – Oct 2017		
Gotham Academy: First Year		#1–6	Dec 2025 – Oct 2026	Limited series	
Gotham Academy: Maps of Mystery		#1	Jul 2023	One-shot	
Gotham by Gaslight: An Alternative History of the Batman			1989	One-shot	
Gotham by Midnight		#1–12	Jan 2015 – Dec 2015		
Gotham by Midnight		Annual #1	2015		
Gotham Central		#1–40	Feb 2003 – Apr 2006		
Gotham City Garage		#1–12	Dec 2017 – May 2018		
Gotham City Monsters		#1–6	Nov 2019 – Apr 2020	Limited series	
Gotham City Sirens	vol. 1	#1–26	Aug 2009 – Oct 2011		
Gotham City Sirens	vol. 2	#1–4	Oct 2024	Weekly limited series	
Gotham City Sirens: Uncovered		#1	Feb 2025	One-shot	
Gotham City Sirens: Unfit for Orbit		#1–5	Sep 2025	Weekly limited series	
Gotham City Villains Anniversary Giant		#1	Jan 2022	One-shot	
Gotham City: Year One		#1–6	Dec 2022 – May 2023	Limited series	
Gotham Gazette	Batman Alive?	#1	May 2009	One-shot	
Gotham Gazette	Batman Dead?	#1	May 2009	One-shot	
Gotham Girls		#1–5	Oct 2002 – Feb 2003	Limited series	
Gotham High			2020	Graphic novel	
Gotham Underground		#1–9	Dec 2007 – Aug 2008	Limited series	
Grayson		#1–20	Sep 2014 – Jul 2016		
Grayson		Annual #1–3	2015 – 2016		
Grayson		Futures End #1	Nov 2014		
The Great Ten		#1–9	Jan 2010 – Sep 2010	Limited series	
Green Arrow	vol. 1	#1–4	May 1983 – Aug 1983	Limited series	
Green Arrow	vol. 2	#1–137	Feb 1988 – Oct 1998		
Green Arrow	vol. 2	#0	Oct 1994	Zero Hour tie-in	
Green Arrow	vol. 2	#1,000,000	Nov 1998	DC One Million tie-in	
Green Arrow	vol. 2	Annual #1–7	1988 – 1994		
Green Arrow	vol. 3	#1–75	Apr 2001 – Aug 2007		
Green Arrow	vol. 3	Secret Files & Origins #1	Dec 2002		
Green Arrow	vol. 4	#30–32	Apr 2010 – Jun 2010	Formerly Green Arrow/Black Canary; issue #30 titled Black Lantern Green Arrow	
Green Arrow	vol. 5	#1–15	Aug 2010 – Oct 2011		
Green Arrow	vol. 6	#0–52	Nov 2011 – Jul 2016	Issue #0 was published between #12 and #13	
Green Arrow	vol. 6	#23.1	Nov 2013	Forever Evil tie-in	
Green Arrow	vol. 6	Annual #1	2015		
Green Arrow	vol. 6	Futures End #1	Nov 2014		
Green Arrow	vol. 7	#1–50	Aug 2016 – May 2019		
Green Arrow	vol. 7	Annual #1–2	2018		
Green Arrow	vol. 7	Rebirth #1	Aug 2016		
Green Arrow	vol. 8	#1–31	Jun 2023 – Feb 2026		
Green Arrow	vol. 8	2024 Annual	2024		
Green Arrow 80th Anniversary 100-Page Super Spectacular		#1	Aug 2021	One-shot	
Green Arrow/Black Canary		#1–29	Dec 2007 – Apr 2010	Becomes Green Arrow vol. 4	
Green Arrow/Black Canary Wedding Special		#1	Nov 2007	One-shot	
Green Arrow: Stranded			2022	Graphic novel	
Green Arrow: The Longbow Hunters		#1–3	Aug 1987 – Oct 1987	Limited series	
Green Arrow: The Wonder Year		#1–4	Feb 1993 – May 1993	Limited series	
Green Arrow: Year One		#1–6	Sep 2007 – Nov 2007	Bi-weekly limited series	
Green Lantern	vol. 1	#1–38	Fall 1941 – May/Jun 1949		
Green Lantern	vol. 2	#1–89	Jul/Aug 1960 – Apr/May 1972		
Green Lantern	vol. 2	#90–205	Aug/Sep 1976 – Oct 1986	Becomes Green Lantern Corps	
Green Lantern	vol. 2	Annual #1	1985	Titled Tales of the Green Lantern Corps Annual	
Green Lantern	vol. 3	#1–181	Jun 1990 – Nov 2004		
Green Lantern	vol. 3	#0	Oct 1994	Zero Hour tie-in	
Green Lantern	vol. 3	#1,000,000	Nov 1998	DC One Million tie-in	
Green Lantern	vol. 3	80-Page Giant #1–3	1998 – 2000		
Green Lantern	vol. 3	Annual #1–9	1992 – 2000		
Green Lantern	vol. 3	Plus #1	Dec 1996		
Green Lantern	vol. 3	Secret Files #1–3	Jul 1998 – Jul 2002		
Green Lantern	vol. 4	#1–67	Jul 2005 – Oct 2011		
Green Lantern	vol. 4	Secret Files and Origins 2005	Jun 2005		
Green Lantern	vol. 5	#0–52	Nov 2011 – Jul 2016	Issue #0 was published between #12 and #13	
Green Lantern	vol. 5	#23.1–23.4	Nov 2013	Forever Evil tie-ins	
Green Lantern	vol. 5	Annual #1–4	2012 – 2015		
Green Lantern	vol. 5	Futures End #1	Nov 2014		
Green Lantern	vol. 6	#1–12	Jan 2019 – Dec 2019	Titled The Green Lantern	
Green Lantern	vol. 6	Annual #1	2019	Titled The Green Lantern	
Green Lantern	vol. 7	#1–12	Apr 2020 – May 2021	Titled The Green Lantern: Season Two	
Green Lantern	vol. 8	#1–12	Jun 2021 – Jun 2022		
Green Lantern	vol. 8	2021 Annual	2021		
Green Lantern	vol. 9	#1–	Jul 2023 – present		
Green Lantern 3-D		#1	Dec 1998	One-shot	
Green Lantern 80th Anniversary 100-Page Super Spectacular		#1	Aug 2020	One-shot	
Green Lantern: 1001 Emerald Nights			May 2001	Elseworlds one-shot	
Green Lantern/Adam Strange		#1	Oct 2000	One-shot; part of the Green Lantern: Circle of Fire series	
Green Lantern: Alliance			2022	Graphic novel	
Green Lantern Annual		#1	1998	One-shot; reprinted material produced as though it was made in 1963	
Green Lantern/Atom		#1	Oct 2000	One-shot; part of the Green Lantern: Circle of Fire series	
Green Lantern: Blackstars		#1–3	Jan 2020 – Mar 2020	Limited series	
Green Lantern: Brightest Day, Blackest Night			Aug 2002	One-shot	
Green Lantern: Circle of Fire		#1–2	Oct 2000	Limited series	
Green Lantern Civil Corps Special		#1	Dec 2024	One-shot	
Green Lantern Corps	vol. 1	#206–224	Nov 1986 – May 1988	Formerly Green Lantern vol. 2; titled The Green Lantern Corps	
Green Lantern Corps	vol. 1	Annual #2–3	1986 – 1987	Titled Tales of the Green Lantern Corps Annual	
Green Lantern Corps	vol. 2	#1–63	Aug 2006 – Oct 2011		
Green Lantern Corps	vol. 3	#0–40	Nov 2011 – May 2015	Issue #0 was published between #12 and #13	
Green Lantern Corps	vol. 3	Annual #1–2	2013 – 2014		
Green Lantern Corps	vol. 3	Futures End #1	Nov 2014		
Green Lantern Corps	vol. 4	#1–	Apr 2025 – present		
Green Lantern Corps: Edge of Oblivion		#1–6	Mar 2016 – Aug 2016	Limited series	
Green Lantern Corps Quarterly		#1–8	Summer 1992 – Spring 1994		
Green Lantern Corps: Recharge		#1–5	Nov 2005 – Mar 2006	Limited series	
Green Lantern Dark		#1–7	Dec 2024 – Dec 2025	Elseworlds limited series	
Green Lantern: Dragon Lord		#1–3	Jun 2001 – Aug 2001	Limited series	
Green Lantern: Earth One	vol. 1		2018	Graphic novel	
Green Lantern: Earth One	vol. 2		2020	Graphic novel	
Green Lantern: Emerald Dawn		#1–6	Dec 1989 – May 1990	Limited series	
Green Lantern: Emerald Dawn II		#1–6	Apr 1991 – Sep 1991	Limited series	
Green Lantern: Emerald Warriors		#1–13	Oct 2010 – Nov 2011		
Green Lantern: Evil's Might		#1–3	Aug 2002 – Oct 2002	Elseworlds limited series	
Green Lantern: Fear Itself			1999	Graphic novel	
Green Lantern/Firestorm		#1	Oct 2000	One-shot; part of the Green Lantern: Circle of Fire series	
Green Lantern/Flash: Faster Friends			1997	Limited series; part one of two; continued in Flash/Green Lantern: Faster Friends	
Green Lantern: Fractured Spectrum		#1	Mar 2025	One-shot	
Green Lantern Gallery		#1	1996	One-shot	
Green Lantern: Ganthet's Tale			1992	One-shot	
Green Lantern/Green Arrow		#1–7	Oct 1983 – Apr 1984	Limited series	
Green Lantern/Green Arrow: World's Finest Special		#1	Feb 2025	One-shot	
Green Lantern/Green Lantern		#1	Oct 2000	One-shot; part of the Green Lantern: Circle of Fire series	
Green Lantern/Huckleberry Hound Special		#1	Dec 2018	One-shot	
Green Lantern: Larfleeze Christmas Special		#1	Feb 2011	One-shot	
Green Lantern: Legacy			2020	Graphic novel	
Green Lantern: Legacy: The Last Will and Testament of Hal Jordan			2002	Graphic novel	
Green Lantern: Lost Army		#1–6	Aug 2015 – Jan 2016	Limited series	
Green Lantern: Mosaic		#1–18	Jun 1992 – Nov 1993		
Green Lantern Movie Prequel	Abin Sur	#1	Jul 2011	One-shot; tie-in to Green Lantern movie	
Green Lantern Movie Prequel	Hal Jordan	#1	Jul 2011	One-shot; tie-in to Green Lantern movie	
Green Lantern Movie Prequel	Kilowog	#1	Jul 2011	One-shot; tie-in to Green Lantern movie	
Green Lantern Movie Prequel	Sinestro	#1	Oct 2011	One-shot; tie-in to Green Lantern movie	
Green Lantern Movie Prequel	Tomar-Re	#1	Jul 2011	One-shot; tie-in to Green Lantern movie	
Green Lantern/New Gods: Godhead		#1	Dec 2014	One-shot	
Green Lantern: New Guardians		#0–40	Nov 2011 – May 2015	Issue #0 was published between #12 and #13	
Green Lantern: New Guardians		Annual #1–2	2013 – 2014		
Green Lantern: New Guardians		Futures End #1	Nov 2014		
Green Lantern: Our Worlds at War		#1	Aug 2001	One-shot	
Green Lantern/Plastic Man: Weapons of Mass Deception		#1	Feb 2011	One-shot	
Green Lantern/Power Girl		#1	Oct 2000	One-shot; part of the Green Lantern: Circle of Fire series	
Green Lantern: Rebirth		#1–6	Dec 2004 – May 2005	Limited series	
Green Lantern/Sentinel: Heart of Darkness		#1–3	Mar 1998 – May 1998	Limited series	
Green Lantern/Silver Surfer: Unholy Alliances			1995	One-shot; co-published with Marvel	
Green Lantern/Sinestro Corps: Secret Files		#1	Dec 2007	One-shot	
Green Lantern: Sinestro Corps Special		#1	Aug 2007	One-shot	
Green Lantern/Space Ghost Special		#1	May 2017	One-shot	
Green Lantern Special		#1–2	1988 – 1989		
Green Lantern/Superman: Legend of the Green Flame			Nov 2000	One-shot	
Green Lantern: The Animated Series		#0–14	Jan 2012 – Sep 2013		
Green Lantern: The New Corps		#1–2	Feb 1999 – Mar 1999	Limited series	
Green Lantern Versus Aliens		#1–4	Sep 2000 – Dec 2000	Limited series; co-published with Dark Horse Comics	
Green Lantern: War Journal		#1–12	Nov 2023 – Oct 2024		
Green Lantern: WillWorld			2001	Graphic novel	
Green Lanterns		#1–57	Aug 2016 – Dec 2018		
Green Lanterns		Annual #1	Jul 2018		
Green Lanterns		Rebirth #1	Aug 2016		
The Green Team: Teen Trillionaires		#1–8	Jul 2013 – Mar 2014		
The Griffin		#1–6	Nov 1991 – Apr 1992	Limited series	
Grifter		#0–16	Nov 2011 – Mar 2013	Issue #0 was published between #12 and #13	
Gross Point		#1–14	Aug 1997 – Aug 1998		
Guardians of Metropolis		#1–4	Nov 1994 – Feb 1995	Limited series	
Gunfire		#1–13	May 1994 – Jun 1995		
Gunfire		#0	Oct 1994	Zero Hour tie-in	
Guns of the Dragon		#1–4	Oct 1998 – Jan 1999	Limited series	
Guy Gardner		#1–16	Oct 1992 – Jan 1994	Becomes Guy Gardner: Warrior	
Guy Gardner: Collateral Damage		#1–2	Jan 2007	Limited series	
Guy Gardner: Reborn		#1–3	May 1992 – Jul 1992	Limited series	
Guy Gardner: Warrior		#17–44	Feb 1994 – Jul 1996	Formerly Guy Gardner	
Guy Gardner: Warrior		#0	Oct 1994	Zero Hour tie-in	
Guy Gardner: Warrior		Annual #1–2	1995 – 1996		

== H ==
Title	Series	Issues	Dates	Notes	Reference
The Hacker Files		#1–12	Aug 1992 – Jul 1993		
Hal Jordan and the Green Lantern Corps		#1–50	Sep 2016 – Oct 2018		
Hal Jordan and the Green Lantern Corps		Rebirth #1	Sep 2016		
Hammerlocke		#1–9	Sep 1992 – May 1993		
Hard Time Season Two		#1–7	Feb 2006 – Aug 2006	Original series published under the DC Focus imprint	
Hardcore Station		#1–6	Jul 1998 – Dec 1998	Limited series	
Hardware: Season One		#1–6	Oct 2021 – Jul 2022	Limited series	
Harlan Ellison's 7 Against Chaos			2013	Graphic novel; published under the DC Entertainment imprint	
Harleen		#1–3	Nov 2019 – Feb 2020	Limited series; published under the DC Black Label imprint	
Harley & Ivy: Life & Crimes		#1–6	Jan 2026 – Aug 2026	Limited series	
Harley & Ivy: Love on the Lam			Nov 2001	One-shot	
Harley & Ivy Meet Betty & Veronica		#1–6	Dec 2017 – May 2018	Limited series; co-published with Archie Comics	
Harley Loves Joker		#1–2	Jul 2018	Limited series	
Harley Quinn	vol. 1	#1–38	Dec 2000 – Jan 2004		
Harley Quinn	vol. 2	#0–30	Jan 2014 – Sep 2016		
Harley Quinn	vol. 2	Annual #1	2014		
Harley Quinn	vol. 2	Futures End #1	Nov 2014		
Harley Quinn	vol. 2	Holiday Special #1	Feb 2015		
Harley Quinn	vol. 2	Road Trip Special #1	Nov 2015		
Harley Quinn	vol. 2	Valentine's Day Special #1	Apr 2015		
Harley Quinn	vol. 3	#1–75	Oct 2016 – Oct 2020		
Harley Quinn	vol. 4	#1–	May 2021 – present		
Harley Quinn	vol. 4	2021 – 2022; 2024 Annual	2021 – 2022; 2024		
Harley Quinn 25th Anniversary Special		#1	Nov 2017	One-shot	
Harley Quinn 30th Anniversary Special		#1	Nov 2022	One-shot	
Harley Quinn and Her Gang of Harleys		#1–6	Jun 2016 – Nov 2016	Limited series	
Harley Quinn and Poison Ivy		#1–6	Nov 2019 – Apr 2020	Limited series	
Harley Quinn and Power Girl		#1–6	Aug 2015 – Jan 2016	Limited series	
Harley Quinn & the Birds of Prey		#1–4	Apr 2020 – Apr 2021	Limited series; published under the DC Black Label imprint	
Harley Quinn & the Suicide Squad April Fool's Special		#1	Jun 2016	One-shot	
Harley Quinn: Be Careful What You Wish For		#1	Mar 2018	One-shot	
Harley Quinn: Black + White + Redder		#1–6	Sep 2023 – Feb 2024	Limited series	
Harley Quinn: Breaking Glass			2019	Graphic novel; published under the DC Ink imprint	
Harley Quinn Fartacular: Silent Butt Deadly		#1	May 2025	One-shot	
Harley Quinn/Gossamer Special		#1	Oct 2018	One-shot	
Harley Quinn Invades Comic-Con International: San Diego		#1	Sep 2014	One-shot	
Harley Quinn: Our Worlds at War		#1	Oct 2001	One-shot	
Harley Quinn: The Animated Series	Legion of Bats!	#1–6	Dec 2022 – May 2023	Limited series	
Harley Quinn: The Animated Series	The Eat. Bang! Kill. Tour	#1–6	Nov 2021 – Apr 2022	Limited series	
Harley Quinn: The Animated Series	The Real Sidekicks of New Gotham Special	#1	Oct 2022	One-shot	
Harley Quinn: Uncovered		#1	Feb 2023	One-shot	
Harley Quinn: Villain of The Year		#1	Feb 2020	One-shot	
Harley Quinn X Elvira		#1–6	Dec 2025 – Jun 2026	Limited series; co-published with Dynamite Entertainment	
Harley Quinn's Bud and Lou: Trouble Times Two			2025	Graphic novel	
Harley's Little Black Book		#1–6	Feb 2016 – May 2017	Limited series	
Haven: The Broken City		#1–9	Feb 2002 – Oct 2002	Limited series	
Hawk and Dove	vol. 1	#1–6	Aug/Sep 1968 – Jun/Jul 1969	Titled The Hawk and the Dove	
Hawk and Dove	vol. 2	#1–5	Oct 1988 – Holiday 1989	Limited series	
Hawk and Dove	vol. 3	#1–28	Jun 1989 – Oct 1991		
Hawk and Dove	vol. 3	Annual #1–2	1990 – 1991		
Hawk and Dove	vol. 4	#1–5	Nov 1997 – Mar 1998	Limited series	
Hawk and Dove	vol. 5	#1–8	Sep 2011 – Jun 2012		
Hawkgirl	vol. 1	#50–66	Aug 2006 – Sep 2007	Formerly Hawkman (vol. 4)	
Hawkgirl	vol. 2	#1–6	Sep 2023 – Feb 2024	Limited series	
Hawkman	vol. 1	#1–27	Apr/May 1964 – Aug/Sep 1968	Becomes Atom and Hawkman	
Hawkman	vol. 2	#1–17	Aug 1986 – Dec 1987		
Hawkman	vol. 3	#1–33	Sep 1993 – Jul 1996		
Hawkman	vol. 3	#0	Oct 1994	Zero Hour tie-in	
Hawkman	vol. 3	Annual #1–2	1993 – 1995		
Hawkman	vol. 4	#1–49	May 2002 – Apr 2006	Becomes Hawkgirl	
Hawkman	vol. 5	#1–29	Aug 2018 – Jan 2021		
Hawkman: Found		#1	Feb 2018	One-shot; Dark Nights: Metal tie-in	
Hawkman Secret Files and Origins		#1	Oct 2002	One-shot	
Hawkman Special	vol. 1	#1	Mar 1986	One-shot	
Hawkman Special	vol. 2	#1	Aug 2008	One-shot	
Hawkworld	vol. 1	#1–3	Aug 1989 – Oct 1989	Limited series	
Hawkworld	vol. 2	#1–32	Jun 1990 – Mar 1993		
Hawkworld	vol. 2	Annual #1–3	1990 – 1992		
Haywire		#1–13	Oct 1988 – Sep 1989		
Heart Throbs		#47–146	Apr/May 1957 – Oct 1972	Earlier issues published by Quality Comics; becomes Love Stories	
The Heckler		#1–6	Sep 1992 – Feb 1993		
Hellblazer	vol. 1	#1–62	Jan 1988 – Feb 1993	Continued as a Vertigo title	
Hellblazer	vol. 1	Annual #1	Oct 1989		
Hellblazer	vol. 2	#1–24	Oct 2016 – Sep 2018	Titled The Hellblazer	
Hellblazer	vol. 2	Rebirth #1	Sep 2016	Titled The Hellblazer	
Hellblazer: Rise and Fall		#1–3	Nov 2020 – Apr 2021	Limited series; published under the DC Black Label imprint	
Helmet of Fate	Black Alice	#1	Apr 2007	One-shot	
Helmet of Fate	Detective Chimp	#1	Mar 2007	One-shot	
Helmet of Fate	Ibis the Invincible	#1	Mar 2007	One-shot	
Helmet of Fate	Sargon the Sorcerer	#1	Apr 2007	One-shot	
Helmet of Fate	Zauriel	#1	May 2007	One-shot	
He-Man and the Masters of the Multiverse		#1–6	Jan 2020 – Jul 2020	Limited series	
He-Man and the Masters of the Universe	vol. 1	#1–6	Sep 2012 – Mar 2013	Limited series; published under the DC Entertainment imprint	
He-Man and the Masters of the Universe	vol. 2	#1–19	Jun 2013 – Jan 2015	Published under the DC Entertainment imprint	
He-Man: The Eternity War		#1–15	Feb 2015 – Apr 2016		
He-Man/ThunderCats		#1–6	Dec 2016 – May 2017	Limited series	
Hercules Unbound		#1–12	Nov 1975 – Sep 1977		
Here's Howie		#1–18	Jan/Feb 1952 – Nov/Dec 1954		
H-E-R-O		#1–22	Apr 2003 – Jan 2005		
Hero Hotline		#1–6	Apr 1989 – Sep 1989	Limited series	
Heroes Against Hunger		#1	Aug 1986	One-shot	
Heroes in Crisis		#1–9	Nov 2018 – Jul 2019	Limited series	
Hex		#1–18	Sep 1985 – Feb 1987		
History of the DC Universe		#1–2	Sep 1986 – Nov 1986	Limited series	
Hitchhiker's Guide to the Galaxy		#1–3	1993	Limited series; novel adaptation	
Hitman		#1–60	Apr 1996 – Jun 2001		
Hitman		#1,000,000	Nov 1998	DC One Million tie-in	
Hitman		Annual #1	1997		
Hitman/Lobo: That Stupid Bastich		#1	Sep 2000	One-shot	
Hollywood Funny Folks		#27–60	Aug/Sep 1950 – Jul/Aug 1954	Formerly Funny Folks; becomes Nutsy Squirrel	
Hopalong Cassidy		#86–135	Feb 1954 – May/Jun 1959	Earlier issues published by Fawcett Comics	
Hot Wheels		#1–6	Mar/Apr 1970 – Jan/Feb 1971		
Hourman		#1–25	Apr 1999 – Apr 2001		
House of El	Book One: The Shadow Threat		2021	Graphic novel	
House of El	Book Two: The Enemy Delusion		2022	Graphic novel	
House of El	Book Three: The Treacherous Hope		2023	Graphic novel	
House of Mystery		#1–321	Dec/Jan 1951/2 – Oct 1983	See also Vertigo list	
House of Secrets		#1–80	Nov/Dec 1956 – Sep/Oct 1966	See also Vertigo list	
House of Secrets		#81–154	Aug/Sep 1969 – Oct/Nov 1978	See also Vertigo list	
House of Whispers		#15–22	Jan 2020 – Sep 2020	Published under the DC Black Label imprint; issues #1–14 published under the Vertigo imprint; issues #21 & 22 released digitally-only	
Human Bomb		#1–4	Feb 2013 – May 2013	Limited series	
Human Defense Corps		#1–6	Jul 2003 – Dec 2003	Limited series	
The Human Race		#1–7	May 2005 – Nov 2005	Limited series	
Human Target	vol. 3	#1–6	Apr 2010 – Sep 2010	Limited series; volumes 1 & 2 published under the Vertigo imprint	
Human Target	vol. 4	#1–12	Jan 2022 – Apr 2023	Limited series; published under the DC Black Label imprint	
Human Target Special		#1	Nov 1991	One-shot	
The Huntress	vol. 1	#1–19	Apr 1989 – Oct 1990		
The Huntress	vol. 2	#1–4	Jun 1994 – Sep 1994	Limited series	
Huntress	vol. 3	#1–6	Oct 2011 – Mar 2012	Limited series	
Huntress: Year One		#1–6	May 2008 – Aug 2008	Limited series	

== I ==
Title	Series	Issues	Dates	Notes	Reference
I Am Batman		#0–18	Oct 2021 – Apr 2023		
I Am Not Starfire			2021	Graphic novel	
I, Vampire		#0–19	Nov 2011 – Jun 2013	Issue #0 was published between #12 and #13	
iCandy		#1–6	Nov 2003 – Apr 2004		
Icon & Rocket: Season One		#1–6	Sep 2021 – May 2022	Limited series	
Icon vs. Hardware		#1–5	Apr 2023 – Jan 2024	Limited series	
Identity Crisis		#1–7	Aug 2004 – Feb 2005	Limited series	
The Immortal Doctor Fate		#1–3	Jan 1985 – Mar 1985	Limited series	
Immortal Legend Batman		#1–6	Oct 2025 – Apr 2026	Elseworlds limited series	
The Immortal Men		#1–6	Jun 2018 – Nov 2018		
Impulse		#1–89	Apr 1995 – Oct 2002		
Impulse		#1,000,000	Nov 1998	DC One Million tie-in	
Impulse		Annual #1–2	1996 – 1997		
Impulse		Plus #1	Sep 1997		
Impulse/Atom Double-Shot		#1	Feb 1998		
Impulse: Bart Saves the Universe			Mar 1999	One-shot	
The Incredible Hulk vs Superman		#1	Jul 1999	One-shot; co-published with Marvel	
inFamous		#1–6	Early May 2011 – Late Jun 2011	Limited series	
The Infected	Deathbringer	#1	Feb 2020	One-shot	
The Infected	King Shazam!	#1	Jan 2020	One-shot	
The Infected	Scarab	#1	Jan 2020	One-shot	
The Infected	The Commissioner	#1	Feb 2020	One-shot	
The Inferior Five	vol. 1	#1–10	Mar/Apr 1967 – Sep/Oct 1968		
The Inferior Five	vol. 1	#11–12	Aug/Sep 1972 – Oct/Nov 1972		
The Inferior Five	vol. 2	#1–6	Nov 2019 – Jun 2021	Limited series; originally planned as a 12 issue series; issues #5–6 released digitally-only.	
Inferno		#1–4	Oct 1997 – Feb 1998	Limited series	
Infinite Crisis		#1–7	Dec 2005 – Jun 2006	Limited series	
Infinite Crisis	Secret Files 2006	#1	Apr 2006	One-shot	
Infinite Crisis: Fight for the Multiverse		#1–12	Sep 2014 – Aug 2015	Video game tie-in	
Infinite Frontier		#0–6	May 2021 – Nov 2021	Limited series	
Infinite Frontier	Secret Files	#1	Aug 2021	One-shot	
Infinity Inc.	vol. 1	#1–53	Mar 1984 – Aug 1988		
Infinity Inc.	vol. 1	Annual #1–2	1985; 1988	Annual #2 story begins in Young All-Stars Annual #1	
Infinity Inc.	vol. 1	Special #1	1987	Story begins in The Outsiders Special #1	
Infinity Inc.	vol. 2	#1–12	Nov 2007 – Aug 2008		
Infinity Man and the Forever People		#1–9	Aug 2014 – May 2015		
Infinity Man and the Forever People		Futures End #1	Nov 2014		
Injustice 2		#1–36	Jul 2017 – Dec 2018		
Injustice 2		Annual #1–2	Jan 2018 – Jan 2019		
Injustice: Gods Among Us		#1–12	Mar 2013 – Mar 2014	Limited series	
Injustice: Gods Among Us		Annual #1	Jan 2014		
Injustice: Gods Among Us	Year Two	#1–12	Mar 2014 – Late Nov 2014	Limited series	
Injustice: Gods Among Us	Year Two	Annual #1	Dec 2014		
Injustice: Gods Among Us	Year Three	#1–12	Early Dec 2014 – Late May 2015	Limited series	
Injustice: Gods Among Us	Year Three	Annual #1	Jun 2015		
Injustice: Gods Among Us	Year Four	#1–12	Early Jul 2015 – Dec 2015	Limited series	
Injustice: Gods Among Us	Year Four	Annual #1	Feb 2016		
Injustice: Gods Among Us	Year Five	#1–20	Mar 2016 – Dec 2016	Limited series	
Injustice: Gods Among Us	Year Five	Annual #1	Jan 2017		
Injustice: Ground Zero		#1–12	Feb 2017 – Jul 2017	Limited series	
Injustice vs. Masters of the Universe		#1–6	Sep 2018 – Mar 2019	Limited series	
Insurgent		#1–3	Mar 2013 – May 2013	Limited series; was supposed to be 6 issues but cancelled half-way through; published under the DC Entertainment imprint	
Invasion!		#1–3	Jan 1989 – Mar 1989	Limited series	
Invasion!	Special: Daily Planet	#1	1989	One-shot	
Ion		#1–12	Jun 2006 – May 2007	Limited series	
Ironwolf		#1	1986	One-shot	
Ironwolf: Fires of the Revolution			1992	Graphic novel	
Isis		#1–8	Oct/Nov 1976 – Dec/Jan 1977/8	A DC-TV Comic	
It's Game Time		#1–4	Sep/Oct 1955 – Mar/Apr 1956		

== J ==
Title	Series	Issues	Dates	Notes	Reference
Jack Cross		#1–4	Oct 2005 – Jan 2006	Limited series	
Jack Kirby's Fourth World		#1–20	Mar 1997 – Oct 1998	Story continues from New Gods vol. 4	
Jackie Gleason and the Honeymooners		#1–12	Jun/Jul 1956 – Apr/May 1958		
Jay Garrick: The Flash		#1–6	Dec 2023 – Jun 2024	Limited series	
Jemm, Son of Saturn		#1–12	Sep 1984 – Aug 1985	Limited series	
Jenny Sparks		#1–7	Oct 2024 – Apr 2025	Limited series; published under the DC Black Label imprint	
The Jetsons		#1–6	Jan 2018 – Mar 2018	Limited series	
Jimmy Olsen		#1	May 2011	One-shot	
Jimmy Olsen's Supercyclopedia			2025	Graphic novel	
Jimmy Wakely		#1–18	Sep/Oct 1949 – Ju/Aug 1952		
Jinny Hex Special		#1	Feb 2021	One-shot; published under the Wonder Comics pop-up imprint	
JLA		#1–125	Jan 1997 – Apr 2006		
JLA		#1,000,000	Nov 1998	DC One Million tie-in	
JLA		80-Page Giant #1–3	1998 – 2000		
JLA		Annual #1–4	1997 – 2000		
JLA		Secret Files #1–3	Sep 1997 – Dec 2000		
JLA: A League of One			2000	Graphic novel	
JLA: Act of God		#1–3	Nov 2000 – Jan 2001	Elseworlds limited series	
JLA: Age of Wonder		#1–2	2003	Elseworlds limited series	
JLA: Black Baptism		#1–4	May 2001 – Aug 2001	Limited series	
JLA Classified		#1–54	Jan 2005 – May 2008		
JLA Classified: Cold Steel		#1–2	Feb 2006 – Mar 2006	Limited series	
JLA: Created Equal		#1–2	Mar 2000 – Apr 2000	Elseworlds limited series	
JLA/Cyberforce		#1	Jan 2005	One-shot; co-published with Top Cow Productions	
JLA: Destiny		#1–4	Jun 2002 – Sep 2002	Elseworlds limited series	
JLA/Doom Patrol Special		#1	Mar 2018	One-shot; published under the Young Animal pop-up imprint	
JLA: Earth 2			2000	Graphic novel	
JLA: Foreign Bodies			1999	One-shot	
JLA: Gallery			1997	One-shot	
JLA: Gatekeeper		#1–3	Dec 2001 – Feb 2002	Limited series	
JLA: Gods and Monsters		#1	Aug 2001	One-shot	
JLA/Haven	Anathema	#1	Nov 2002	One-shot	
JLA/Haven	Arrival	#1	Jan 2002	One-shot	
JLA: Heaven's Ladder			2000	Graphic novel	
JLA in Crisis Secret Files		#1	Nov 1998	One-shot	
JLA: Incarnations		#1–7	Jul 2001 – Feb 2002	Limited series	
JLA/JSA Secret Files and Origins		#1	Jan 2003	One-shot	
JLA/JSA: Virtue and Vice			2002	Graphic novel	
JLA: Liberty and Justice			2003	Graphic novel	
JLA: Our Worlds at War		#1	Sep 2001	One-shot	
JLA: Paradise Lost		#1–3	Jan 1998 – Mar 1998	Limited series	
JLA: Primeval			1999	One-shot	
JLA: Riddle of the Beast			2001	Elseworlds graphic novel	
JLA: Scary Monsters		#1–6	May 2003 – Oct 2003	Limited series	
JLA Secret Files and Origins 2004		#1	Nov 2004	One-shot	
JLA: Secret Origins			2002	Graphic novel	
JLA: Seven Caskets			2000	One-shot	
JLA: Shogun of Steel			2002	Elseworlds one-shot	
JLA Showcase 80-Page Giant		#1	Feb 2000	One-shot	
JLA/Spectre: Soul War		#1–2	2003	Limited series	
JLA: Superpower			Nov 1999	One-shot	
JLA/The 99		#1–6	Dec 2010 – May 2011	Limited series; co-published with Teshkeel Comics	
JLA: The Island of Dr. Moreau			Sep 2002	Elseworlds one-shot	
JLA: The Nail		#1–3	Aug 1998 – Oct 1998	Elseworlds limited series	
JLA: The Secret Society of Super-Heroes		#1–2	2000	Elseworlds limited series	
JLA/Titans		#1–3	Dec 1998 – Feb 1999	Limited series	
JLA: Tomorrow Woman		#1	Jun 1998	One-shot; part of the GirlFrenzy! series	
JLA Versus Predator			Feb 2001	One-shot; co-published with Dark Horse Comics	
JLA: Welcome to the Working Week			2003	One-shot	
JLA/WildC.A.T.s			1997	One-shot; co-published with Image Comics	
JLA/Witchblade		#1	Dec 2000	One-shot; co-published with Top Cow Productions	
JLA: World Without Grown-Ups		#1–2	Aug 1998 – Sep 1998	Limited series	
JLA: Year One		#1–12	Jan 1998 – Dec 1998	Limited series	
JLA-Z		#1–3	Nov 2003 – Jan 2004	Limited series	
JLX		#1	Apr 1996	One-shot; published under the Amalgam Comics imprint in association with Marvel	
JLX Unleashed		#1	Jun 1997	One-shot; published under the Amalgam Comics imprint in association with Marvel	
Joe Kubert: 100 Years - A Life in Covers		#1	Nov 2026	One-shot	
Joe Kubert Presents		#1–6	Dec 2012 – May 2013	Limited series	
John Constantine: Hellblazer		#1–12	Jan 2020 – Jan 2021	Published under the DC Black Label imprint	
John Constantine, Hellblazer: Dead in America		#1–11	Mar 2024 – Feb 2025	Limited series; published under the DC Black Label imprint	
John Stewart: The Emerald Knight		#1	Feb 2023	One-shot	
Johnny Thunder		#1–3	Feb/Mar 1973 – Jul/Aug 1973		
The Joker	vol. 1	#1–9	May 1975 – Sep/Oct 1976		
The Joker	vol. 1	#10	Dec 2019		
The Joker	vol. 2	#1–15	May 2021 – Sep 2022		
The Joker	vol. 2	2021 Annual	2021		
Joker			2008	Graphic novel	
The Joker 80th Anniversary 100-Page Super Spectacular		#1	Aug 2020	One-shot	
The Joker/Daffy Duck		#1	Oct 2018	One-shot	
The Joker: Devil's Advocate			1996	Graphic novel	
Joker/Harley: Criminal Sanity		#1–8	Dec 2019 – Jun 2021	Limited series; published under the DC Black Label imprint	
Joker/Harley: Criminal Sanity		Secret Files #1	Sep 2020	One-shot; published under the DC Black Label imprint	
The Joker/Harley Quinn: Uncovered		#1	Feb 2024	One-shot	
Joker: Killer Smile		#1–3	Dec 2019 – Apr 2020	Limited series; published under the DC Black Label imprint	
Joker: Last Laugh		#1–6	Dec 2001 – Jan 2002	Limited series	
Joker: Last Laugh	Secret Files	#1	Dec 2001	One-shot	
Joker/Mask		#1–4	May 2000 – Aug 2000	Limited series; co-published with Dark Horse Comics	
The Joker Presents: A Puzzlebox		#1–7	Oct 2021 – Apr 2022	Limited series	
The Joker: The Man Who Stopped Laughing		#1–12	Dec 2022 – Jan 2024		
Joker: The World			2024	Graphic novel	
The Joker: Uncovered		#1	Aug 2023	One-shot	
The Joker: Year of The Villain		#1	Dec 2019	One-shot	
Joker's Asylum	Penguin	#1	Sep 2008	One-shot	
Joker's Asylum	Poison Ivy	#1	Sep 2008	One-shot	
Joker's Asylum	Scarecrow	#1	Sep 2008	One-shot	
Joker's Asylum	The Joker	#1	Sep 2008	One-shot	
Joker's Asylum	Two-Face	#1	Sep 2008	One-shot	
Joker's Asylum II	Clayface	#1	Aug 2010	One-shot	
Joker's Asylum II	Harley Quinn	#1	Aug 2010	One-shot	
Joker's Asylum II	Killer Croc	#1	Aug 2010	One-shot	
Joker's Asylum II	Mad Hatter	#1	Aug 2010	One-shot	
Joker's Asylum II	The Riddler	#1	Aug 2010	One-shot	
Jonah Hex	vol. 1	#1–92	Mar/Apr 1977 – Aug 1985		
Jonah Hex	vol. 2	#1–70	Jan 2006 – Oct 2011		
Jonah Hex and Other Western Tales		#1–3	Sep/Oct 1979 – Jan/Feb 1980	Digest sized	
Jonah Hex and the Shadow of Death		#1–6	Dec 2026 – present	Limited series	
Jonah Hex: No Way Back			2010	Graphic novel	
Jonah Hex/Yosemite Sam Special		#1	Aug 2017	One-shot	
Jonni Thunder		#1–4	Feb 1985 – Aug 1985	Limited series	
JSA	vol. 1	#1–87	Aug 1999 – Sep 2006		
JSA	vol. 1	Annual #1	Oct 2000		
JSA	vol. 1	Secret Files #1–2	Aug 1999 – Sep 2001		
JSA	vol. 2	#1–24	Jan 2025 – Dec 2026		
JSA: All Stars (2003)		#1–8	Jul 2003 – Feb 2004	Limited series	
JSA All-Stars (2010)		#1–18	Feb 2010 – Jul 2011		
JSA Classified		#1–39	Sep 2005 – Jun 2008		
JSA Kingdom Come Special	Magog	#1	Jan 2009	One-shot	
JSA Kingdom Come Special	Superman	#1	Jan 2009	One-shot	
JSA Kingdom Come Special	The Kingdom	#1	Jan 2009	One-shot	
JSA Liberty Files: The Whistling Skull		#1–6	Feb 2013 – Jul 2013	Limited series	
JSA: Our Worlds at War		#1	Sep 2001	One-shot	
JSA: Strange Adventures		#1–6	Oct 2004 – Mar 2005	Limited series	
JSA: The Liberty File		#1–2	Feb 2000 – Mar 2000	Elseworlds limited series	
JSA: The Unholy Three		#1–2	Apr 2003 – May 2003	Elseworlds limited series	
JSA vs. Kobra		#1–6	Jun 2009 – Nov 2009	Limited series	
The Judas Coin			2012	Graphic novel	
Judge Dredd		#1–18	Aug 1994 – Jan 1996		
Judge Dredd: Legends of the Law		#1–13	Dec 1994 – Dec 1995		
Judge Dredd: The Official Movie Adaptation			1995	One-shot movie adaptation	
The Jurassic League		#1–6	Jul 2022 – Dec 2022	Limited series	
Just Imagine Stan Lee	Secret Files and Origins	#1	Mar 2002	One-shot	
Just Imagine Stan Lee	with Chris Bachalo Creating Catwoman		Jul 2002	One-shot	
Just Imagine Stan Lee	with Dave Gibbons Creating Green Lantern		Dec 2001	One-shot	
Just Imagine Stan Lee	with Gary Frank creating Shazam!		May 2002	One-shot	
Just Imagine Stan Lee	with Jerry Ordway Creating JLA		Feb 2002	One-shot	
Just Imagine Stan Lee	with Jim Lee Creating Wonder Woman		Oct 2001	One-shot	
Just Imagine Stan Lee	with Joe Kubert Creating Batman		Sep 2001	One-shot	
Just Imagine Stan Lee	with John Buscema Creating Superman		Nov 2001	One-shot	
Just Imagine Stan Lee	with John Byrne Creating Robin		Apr 2002	One-shot	
Just Imagine Stan Lee	with John Cassaday Creating Crisis		Sep 2002	One-shot	
Just Imagine Stan Lee	with Kevin Maguire Creating the Flash		Jan 2002	One-shot	
Just Imagine Stan Lee	with Scott McDaniel Creating Aquaman		Jun 2002	One-shot	
Just Imagine Stan Lee	with Walter Simonson Creating Sandman		Aug 2002	One-shot	
Justice		#1–12	Oct 2005 – Aug 2007	Limited series	
Justice, Inc.	vol. 1	#1–4	May/Jun 1975 – Nov/Dec 1975		
Justice, Inc.	vol. 2	#1–2	Jul 1989 – Aug 1989	Limited series	
Justice League	vol. 1	#1–6	May 1987 – Oct 1987	Becomes Justice League International (vol. 1)	
Justice League	vol. 1	Annual #1	1987		
Justice League	vol. 2	#0–52	Sep 2011 – Aug 2016	Issue #0 was published between #12 and #13	
Justice League	vol. 2	#23.1–23.4	Nov 2013	Forever Evil tie-ins	
Justice League	vol. 2	Futures End #1	Nov 2014		
Justice League	vol. 3	#1–43	Sep 2016 – Jun 2018		
Justice League	vol. 3	Rebirth #1	Sep 2016		
Justice League	vol. 4	#1–75	Aug 2018 – Jun 2022		
Justice League	vol. 4	Annual #1–2	2019 – 2020		
Justice League	vol. 4	2022 Annual	2022		
Justice League 3000		#1–15	Dec 2013 – Mar 2015		
Justice League 3001		#1–12	Aug 2015 – Jul 2016		
Justice League: A Midsummer's Nightmare		#1–3	Sep 1996 – Nov 1996	Limited series	
Justice League Adventures		#1–34	Jan 2002 – Oct 2004	Takes place in the DC Animated Universe	
Justice League America		#26–113	May 1989 – Aug 1996	Formerly Justice League International (vol. 1)	
Justice League America		#0	Oct 1994	Zero Hour tie-in	
Justice League America		Annual #4–10	1990 – 1996		
Justice League/Aquaman: Drowned Earth		#1	Dec 2018	One-shot	
Justice League: Cry for Justice		#1–7	Sep 2009 – Apr 2010	Limited series	
Justice League Dark	vol. 1	#0–40	Sep 2011 – May 2015	Issue #0 was published between #12 and #13	
Justice League Dark	vol. 1	#23.1–23.2	Nov 2013	Forever Evil tie-ins	
Justice League Dark	vol. 1	Annual #1–2	2012 – 2013		
Justice League Dark	vol. 1	Futures End #1	Nov 2014		
Justice League Dark	vol. 2	#1–29	Sep 2018 – Feb 2021		
Justice League Dark	vol. 2	Annual #1	2019		
Justice League Dark	vol. 2	2021 Annual	2021		
Justice League Dark and Wonder Woman: The Witching Hour		#1	Dec 2018	One-shot	
Justice League: Dark Realm Special		#1	Dec 2026	One-shot	
Justice League: Dark Tomorrow Special		#1	Sep 2025	One-shot	
Justice League: Darkseid War	Batman	#1	Dec 2015	One-shot	
Justice League: Darkseid War	Flash	#1	Jan 2016	One-shot	
Justice League: Darkseid War	Green Lantern	#1	Jan 2016	One-shot	
Justice League: Darkseid War	Lex Luthor	#1	Feb 2016	One-shot	
Justice League: Darkseid War	Shazam	#1	Jan 2016	One-shot	
Justice League: Darkseid War	Special	#1	May 2016	One-shot	
Justice League: Darkseid War	Superman	#1	Jan 2016	One-shot	
Justice League: Dream Girls – A DC Pride Event		#1–4	Aug 2026	Weekly limited series	
Justice League Elite		#1–12	Sep 2004 – Aug 2005	Limited series	
Justice League: Endless Winter		#1–2	Feb 2021	Limited series	
Justice League Europe		#1–50	Apr 1989 – May 1993	Becomes Justice League International (vol. 2)	
Justice League Europe		Annual #1–3	1990 – 1992	Becomes Justice League International Annual (vol. 2)	
Justice League: Generation Lost		#1–24	Jul 2010 – Jun 2011	24-issue biweekly, alternating with Brightest Day	
Justice League: Gods and Monsters		#1–3	Oct 2015	Limited series	
Justice League: Gods and Monsters	Batman	#1	Sep 2015	One-shot	
Justice League: Gods and Monsters	Superman	#1	Sep 2015	One-shot	
Justice League: Gods and Monsters	Wonder Woman	#1	Oct 2015	One-shot	
Justice League/Hitman		#1–2	Nov 2007 – Dec 2007	Limited series; also known as JLA/Hitman	
Justice League Incarnate		#1–5	Jan 2022 – May 2022	Limited series	
Justice League Infinity		#1–7	Sep 2021 – Mar 2022	Limited series	
Justice League Intergalactic Special		#1	Jun 2026	One-shot	
Justice League International	vol. 1	#7–25	Nov 1987 – Apr 1989	Formerly Justice League; becomes Justice League America	
Justice League International	vol. 1	Annual #2–3	1988 – 1989		
Justice League International	vol. 1	Special #1–2	1990 – 1991		
Justice League International	vol. 2	#51–68	Jun 1993 – Sep 1994	Formerly Justice League Europe	
Justice League International	vol. 2	Annual #4–5	1993 – 1994	Formerly Justice League Europe Annual	
Justice League International	vol. 3	#1–12	Nov 2011 – Oct 2012		
Justice League International	vol. 3	Annual #1	Oct 2012		
Justice League: Knight Vision Special		#1	Sep 2026	One-shot	
Justice League: Last Ride		#1–7	Jul 2021 – Jan 2022	Limited series	
Justice League: No Justice		#1–4	Jul 2018	Limited series	
Justice League Odyssey		#1–25	Nov 2018 – Dec 2020		
Justice League of America	vol. 1	#1–261	Oct/Nov 1960 – Apr 1987		
Justice League of America	vol. 1	Annual #1–3	Oct 1983 – Nov 1985		
Justice League of America	vol. 2	#0–60	Sep 2006 – Aug 2011		
Justice League of America	vol. 2	80-Page Giant #1	Nov 2009		
Justice League of America	vol. 2	80-Page Giant 2011 #1	Jun 2011		
Justice League of America	vol. 3	#1–14	Apr 2013 – Jul 2014		
Justice League of America	vol. 3	#7.1–7.4	Nov 2013	Forever Evil tie-ins	
Justice League of America	vol. 4	#1–10	Aug 2015 – Jan 2017		
Justice League of America	vol. 5	#1–29	Apr 2017 – Jun 2018		
Justice League of America	vol. 5	Annual #1	Jan 2018		
Justice League of America	vol. 5	Rebirth #1	Apr 2017		
Justice League of America: Another Nail		#1–3	May 2004 – Jul 2004	Elseworlds limited series	
Justice League of America: Killer Frost - Rebirth		#1	Mar 2017	One-shot	
Justice League of America Super-Spectacular		#1	1999	One-shot	
Justice League of America: The Atom - Rebirth		#1	Mar 2017	One-shot	
Justice League of America: The Ray - Rebirth		#1	Mar 2017	One-shot	
Justice League of America: Vixen - Rebirth		#1	Mar 2017	One-shot	
Justice League of America's Vibe		#1–10	Apr 2013 – Feb 2014		
Justice League/Power Rangers		#1–6	Mar 2017 – Nov 2017	Limited series; co-published with Boom! Studios	
Justice League Quarterly		#1–17	Winter 1990 – Winter 1994		
Justice League Red		#1–6	Oct 2025 – Mar 2026	Limited series	
Justice League: Road to Dark Crisis		#1	Jul 2022	One-shot	
Justice League Spectacular		#1	1992	One-shot	
Justice League Task Force		#1–37	Jun 1993 – Aug 1996		
Justice League Task Force		#0	Oct 1994	Zero Hour tie-in	
Justice League: The Atom Project		#1–6	Mar 2025 – Aug 2025	Limited series	
Justice League: The New Frontier Special		#1	May 2008	One-shot	
Justice League: The Omega Act Special		#1	Dec 2025	One-shot	
Justice League: The Rise & Fall Special		#1	May 2010	One-shot	
Justice League: The Rise of Arsenal		#1–4	May 2010 – Aug 2010	Limited series	
Justice League United		#0–16	Jun 2014 – Feb 2016		
Justice League United		Annual #1	2014		
Justice League United		Futures End #1	Nov 2014		
Justice League Unlimited (2004)		#1–46	Nov 2004 – Aug 2008	Based on the animated series	
Justice League Unlimited (2024)		#1–	Jan 2025 – present		
Justice League vs. Godzilla vs. Kong	vol. 1	#1–7	Dec 2023 – Jul 2024	Limited series	
Justice League vs. Godzilla vs. Kong	vol. 2	#1–7	Aug 2025 – Apr 2026	Limited series; titled Justice League vs. Godzilla vs. Kong 2	
Justice League vs. Suicide Squad		#1–6	Feb 2017 – Mar 2017	Limited series	
Justice League vs. The Legion of Super-Heroes		#1–6	Mar 2022 – Nov 2022	Limited series	
Justice League Wedding Special		#1	Nov 2007	One-shot	
Justice Leagues	JL?	#1	Mar 2001	One-shot; part one of six	
Justice Leagues	JLA	#1	Mar 2001	One-shot; part six of six	
Justice Leagues	Justice League of Aliens	#1	Mar 2001	One-shot; part five of six	
Justice Leagues	Justice League of Amazons	#1	Mar 2001	One-shot; part two of six	
Justice Leagues	Justice League of Arkham	#1	Mar 2001	One-shot; part four of six	
Justice Leagues	Justice League of Atlantis	#1	Mar 2001	One-shot; part three of six	
Justice Riders			1997	Elseworlds one-shot	
Justice Society of America	vol. 1	#1–8	Apr 1991 – Nov 1991	Limited series	
Justice Society of America	vol. 2	#1–10	Aug 1992 – May 1993		
Justice Society of America	vol. 3	#1–54	Feb 2007 – Oct 2011		
Justice Society of America	vol. 3	Annual #1–2	2008 – 2010		
Justice Society of America	vol. 3	Special #1	Nov 2010		
Justice Society of America	vol. 4	#1–12	Jan 2023 – Dec 2024	Limited series	
Justice Society of America	vol. 4	Gold Edition #1	Dec 2023	One-shot; reprinting of Justice Society of America vol. 4 #1–3	
Justice Society of America 80-Page Giant		#1	Jan 2010		
Justice Society of America 80-Page Giant	2010	#1	Dec 2010		
Justice Society of America 80-Page Giant	2011	#1	Aug 2011		
Justice Society of America 100-Page Super Spectacular		#1	2000	One-shot	
The Justice Society Returns!			May 1999	Fifth-week event series of one-shots; individual issues are listed separately; also known as JSA Returns	

== See also ==
- List of current DC Comics publications
- List of DC Comics reprint collections
- List of DC Archive Editions
- List of DC Comics imprint publications
- List of Elseworlds publications
- List of DC Comics characters

DC Comics has also published titles under other imprints (chiefly Vertigo, Milestone, WildStorm, ABC, Paradox Press, Amalgam, DC Focus, Johnny DC, Tangent, CMX, Impact, Helix, Minx, and Homage) along with a number of reprints.
