= List of DC Comics publications (T–Z) =

DC Comics is one of the largest comic book publishers in North America. DC has published comic books under a number of different imprints and corporate names. This is a list of all series, mini-series, limited series, one-shots and graphic novels published under the imprints DC or AA, and published by National Periodical Publications, National Comics Publications, All-American Comics, Inc., National Allied Publications, Detective Comics, Inc., and related corporate names, as well as imprints publishing titles directly related to the DC Universe characters and continuity, such as Elseworlds and DC Black Label. The list does not include collected editions; trade paperbacks; digital comics; free, promotional giveaways; or magazines, nor does it include series from imprints mainly publishing titles that are separate from the DC Universe continuity, such as Vertigo or WildStorm; series published under those imprints that are related to the DC Universe continuity are noted, but not listed.

While generally the most recognizable name of a comic is printed on the cover, the cover title can be changed for a number of reasons. For example, Action Comics has frequently been listed as Action Comics featuring Superman or Superman in Action Comics, or even on occasion Supergirl in Action Comics. The official name, however, is found in the indicia, in small print inside the comics.

- List of DC Comics publications (A–B)
- List of DC Comics publications (C–F)
- List of DC Comics publications (G–J)
- List of DC Comics publications (K–O)
- List of DC Comics publications (P–S)

== T ==
Title	Series	Issues	Dates	Notes	Reference
T.H.U.N.D.E.R. Agents	vol. 1	#1–10	Jan 2011 – Oct 2011		
T.H.U.N.D.E.R. Agents	vol. 2	#1–6	Jan 2012 – Jun 2012	Limited series	
Tailgunner Jo		#1–6	Sep 1988 – Jan 1989	Limited series	
Takion		#1–7	Jun 1996 – Dec 1996		
Talent Showcase		#16–19	Apr 1985 – Oct 1985	Formerly New Talent Showcase	
Tales from Earth-6: A Celebration of Stan Lee		#1	Feb 2023	One-shot	
Tales from the Dark Multiverse	Blackest Night	#1	Jan 2020	One-shot	
Tales from the Dark Multiverse	Crisis on Infinite Earths	#1	Feb 2021	One-shot	
Tales from the Dark Multiverse	Dark Nights: Metal	#1	Feb 2021	One-shot	
Tales from the Dark Multiverse	Flashpoint	#1	Feb 2021	One-shot	
Tales from the Dark Multiverse	Hush	#1	Jan 2021	One-shot	
Tales from the Dark Multiverse	Infinite Crisis	#1	Jan 2020	One-shot	
Tales from the Dark Multiverse	Knightfall	#1	Dec 2019	One-shot	
Tales from the Dark Multiverse	The Death of Superman	#1	Dec 2019	One-shot	
Tales from the Dark Multiverse	The Judas Contract	#1	Feb 2020	One-shot; also known as Tales from the Dark Multiverse: Teen Titans: The Judas Contract	
Tales from the Dark Multiverse	Wonder Woman: War of the Gods	#1	Feb 2021	One-shot	
Tales of Ghost Castle		#1–3	May/Jun 1975 – Sep/Oct 1975		
Tales of the Green Lantern Corps		#1–3	May 1981 – Jul 1981	Limited series	
Tales of the Green Lantern Corps: Guy Gardner		#1	Jul 2026	One-shot	
Tales of the Human Target		#1	Oct 2022	One-shot; Human Target (vol. 4) tie-in; published under the DC Black Label imprint	
Tales of the Legion of Super-Heroes		#314–354	Aug 1984 – Dec 1987	Formerly Legion of Super-Heroes (vol. 2)	
Tales of the Legion of Super-Heroes		Annual #4–5	1986 – 1987	Formerly Legion of Super-Heroes (vol. 2)	
Tales of the New Teen Titans		#1–4	Jun 1982 – Sep 1982	Limited series	
Tales of the Sinestro Corps	Cyborg Superman	#1	Dec 2007	One-shot	
Tales of the Sinestro Corps	Ion	#1	Jan 2008	One-shot	
Tales of the Sinestro Corps	Parallax	#1	Nov 2007	One-shot	
Tales of the Sinestro Corps	Superman-Prime	#1	Dec 2007	One-shot	
Tales of the Teen Titans		#41–91	Apr 1984 – Jul 1988	Formerly The New Teen Titans (vol. 1). Annual #3 was titled Teen Titans Annual in the indicia.	
Tales of the Teen Titans		Annual #3–4	1984 – 1986	Formerly The New Teen Titans (vol. 1). Annual #3 was titled Teen Titans Annual in the indicia.	
Tales of the Titans		#1–4	Sep 2023 – Dec 2023	Limited series	
Tales of the Unexpected	vol. 1	#1–104	Feb/Mar 1956 – Dec/Jan 1967/8	Becomes The Unexpected (1968 series)	
Tales of the Unexpected	vol. 2	#1–8	Dec 2006 – Jul 2007	Limited series	
Talon		#0–17	Nov 2012 – May 2014		
Talos of the Wilderness Sea		#1	Sep 1987	One-shot	
Tangent Comics	Doom Patrol	#1	Dec 1997	One-shot	
Tangent Comics	Green Lantern	#1	Dec 1997	One-shot	
Tangent Comics	JLA	#1	Sep 1998	One-shot	
Tangent Comics	Metal Men	#1	Dec 1997	One-shot	
Tangent Comics	Nightwing	#1	Dec 1997	One-shot	
Tangent Comics	Nightwing: Night Force	#1	Sep 1998	One-shot	
Tangent Comics	Powergirl	#1	Sep 1998	One-shot	
Tangent Comics	Sea Devils	#1	Dec 1997	One-shot	
Tangent Comics	Secret Six	#1	Dec 1997	One-shot	
Tangent Comics	Tales of the Green Lantern	#1	Sep 1998	One-shot	
Tangent Comics	The Atom	#1	Dec 1997	One-shot	
Tangent Comics	The Batman	#1	Sep 1998	One-shot	
Tangent Comics	The Flash	#1	Dec 1997	One-shot	
Tangent Comics	The Joker	#1	Dec 1997	One-shot	
Tangent Comics	The Joker's Wild!	#1	Sep 1998	One-shot	
Tangent Comics	The Superman	#1	Sep 1998	One-shot	
Tangent Comics	The Trials of the Flash	#1	Sep 1998	One-shot	
Tangent Comics	Wonder Woman	#1	Sep 1998	One-shot	
Tangent: Superman's Reign		#1–12	May 2008 – Apr 2009	Limited series	
Tarzan		#207–258	Apr 1972 – Feb 1977	Earlier issues published by Dell Comics and Gold Key Comics.	
Tarzan Digest		#1	Aug 1972	One-shot	
Tarzan Family		#60–66	Nov/Dec 1975 – Nov/Dec 1976	Formerly Korak, Son of Tarzan	
Task Force Z		#1–12	Dec 2021 – Nov 2022		
Team 7		#0–8	Nov 2012 – Jul 2013		
Team Superman		#1	Jul 1999	One-shot	
Team Superman Secret Files		#1	May 1998	One-shot	
Team Titans		#1–24	Sep 1992 – Sep 1994		
Team Titans		Annual #1–2	1993 – 1994		
Teen Beam		#2	Jan/Feb 1968	Formerly Teen Beat	
Teen Beat		#1	Nov/Dec 1967	Comic-sized "teen idol gossip" magazine. Renamed Teen Beam for the second issue due to possible trademark infringement with Tiger Beat.	
Teen Titans	vol. 1	#1–43	Jan/Feb 1966 – Jan/Feb 1973		
Teen Titans	vol. 1	#44–53	Nov 1976 – Feb 1978		
Teen Titans	vol. 2	#1–24	Oct 1996 – Sep 1998		
Teen Titans	vol. 2	Annual #1	1997		
Teen Titans	vol. 3	#1–100	Sep 2003 – Aug 2011		
Teen Titans	vol. 3	Annual #1	2006		
Teen Titans	vol. 3	Annual 2009 #1	Jun 2009		
Teen Titans	vol. 4	#0–30	Nov 2011 – Jun 2014	Issue #0 was published between #12 and #13	
Teen Titans	vol. 4	#23.1–23.2	Nov 2013	Forever Evil tie-ins	
Teen Titans	vol. 4	Annual #1–3	2012 – 2014		
Teen Titans	vol. 5	#1–24	Sep 2014 – Nov 2016		
Teen Titans	vol. 5	Annual #1–2	2015 – 2016		
Teen Titans	vol. 5	Futures End #1	Nov 2014		
Teen Titans	vol. 6	#1–47	Dec 2016 – Jan 2021		
Teen Titans	vol. 6	Annual #1–2	2019 – 2020		
Teen Titans	vol. 6	Rebirth #1	Nov 2016		
Teen Titans	vol. 6	Special #1	Aug 2018		
Teen Titans	vol. 7	#1–	Nov 2026 – present		
Teen Titans Academy		#1–15	May 2021 – Jul 2022		
Teen Titans Academy	2021 Yearbook	#1	Aug 2021	One-shot	
Teen Titans Annual No.1, 1967 Issue			1999	One-shot; reprints	
Teen Titans: Beast Boy			2020	Graphic novel	
Teen Titans: Beast Boy Loves Raven			2021	Graphic novel	
Teen Titans: Cold Case		#1	Feb 2011	One-shot	
Teen Titans: Earth One	vol. 1		2014	Graphic novel	
Teen Titans: Earth One	vol. 2		2016	Graphic novel	
Teen Titans: Endless Winter Special		#1	Feb 2021	One-shot	
Teen Titans Go!	vol. 1	#1–55	Jan 2004 – Jul 2008		
Teen Titans Go!	vol. 2	#1–36	Feb 2014 – Nov 2019		
Teen Titans Go!	vol. 2	Special #1	Sep 2018		
Teen Titans Go!	vol. 3	#1–12	May 2025 – Apr 2026		
Teen Titans Go!/DC Super Hero Girls: Exchange Students!			2022	Graphic novel	
Teen Titans Go! On TV!			2025	Graphic novel	
Teen Titans Go! To the Library!			2024	Graphic novel	
Teen Titans Go!: Undead?!			2022	Graphic novel	
Teen Titans/Legion Special		#1	Nov 2004	One-shot	
Teen Titans Lost Annual		#1	Mar 2008	One-shot	
Teen Titans/Outsiders Secret Files	2003		Dec 2003	One-shot	
Teen Titans/Outsiders Secret Files	2005		Oct 2005	One-shot	
Teen Titans: Raven			2019	Graphic novel; published under the DC Ink imprint	
Teen Titans: Robin			2023	Graphic novel	
Teen Titans Spotlight		#1–21	Aug 1986 – Apr 1988		
Teen Titans: Starfire			2024	Graphic novel	
Teen Titans: The Lazarus Contract Special		#1	Jul 2017	One-shot	
Teen Titans: Together			2026	Graphic novel	
Teen Titans: Year One		#1–6	Mar 2008 – Aug 2008	Limited series	
Teeny Titans		#1	Jun 2016	One-shot	
Tell Me, Dark			1992	Graphic novel	
Telos		#1–6	Dec 2015 – May 2016		
Tempest		#1–4	Nov 1996 – Feb 1997	Limited series	
Tempus Fugitive		#1–4	Mar 1990 – Jul 1991	Limited series	
Terra		#1–4	Jan 2009 – Feb 2009	Limited series	
The Terrifics		#1–30	Apr 2018 – Nov 2020	Issues #28–30 released digitally-only	
The Terrifics		Annual #1	2018		
Terror Titans		#1–6	Dec 2008 – May 2009	Limited series	
This Land is Our Land: A Blue Beetle Story			2024	Graphic novel	
Three Dimension Adventures			1953	Reprints of Superman comics in 3-D	
The Three Mouseketeers	vol. 1	#1–26	Mar/Apr 1956 – Nov/Dec 1960		
The Three Mouseketeers	vol. 2	#1–7	May/Jun 1970 – May/Jun 1971		
Threshold		#1–8	Mar 2013 – Oct 2013		
Thriller		#1–12	Nov 1983 – Oct 1984		
Thrilling Comics		#1	May 1999	One-shot; part of The Justice Society Returns! series	
Thrillkiller		#1–3	Jan 1997 – Mar 1997	Elseworlds limited series	
Thrillkiller '62			1998	Elseworlds one-shot	
Tim Drake: Robin		#1–10	Nov 2022 – Aug 2023		
Timber Wolf		#1–5	Nov 1992 – Mar 1993	Limited series	
Time Masters		#1–8	Feb 1990 – Sep 1990	Limited series	
Time Masters: Vanishing Point		#1–6	Sep 2010 – Jan 2011	Limited series	
Time Warp		#1–5	Oct/Nov 1979 – Jun/Jul 1980		
Tiny Titans		#1–50	Apr 2008 – May 2012		
Tiny Titans/Little Archie		#1–3	Dec 2010 – Feb 2011	Limited series; co-published with Archie Comics	
Tiny Titans: Return to the Treehouse		#1–6	Aug 2014 – Jan 2015	Limited series	
Tiny Toon Adventures Magazine		#1–4	Oct 1990 – Sep 1991	Continues under Welsh Publishing Group	
'Tis the Season to be Freezin'		#1	Feb 2022	One-shot	
Titans	vol. 1	#1–50	Mar 1999 – Apr 2003	Titled The Titans	
Titans	vol. 1	Annual #1	2000	Titled The Titans	
Titans	vol. 1	Secret Files #1–2	Mar 1999 – Oct 2000	Titled The Titans	
Titans	vol. 2	#1–38	Jun 2008 – Oct 2011		
Titans	vol. 2	Annual #1	Sep 2011		
Titans	vol. 3	#1–36	Sep 2016 – Jun 2019		
Titans	vol. 3	Annual #1–2	May 2017 – Apr 2018		
Titans	vol. 3	Rebirth #1	Aug 2016		
Titans	vol. 3	Special #1	Aug 2018		
Titans	vol. 4	#1–32	Jul 2023 – Apr 2026	Continued as New Titans vol. 2	
Titans	vol. 4	2025 Annual	2025		
Titans: Beast World		#1–6	Jan 2024 – Mar 2024	Limited series	
Titans: Beast World	Evolution	#1	Jan 2024	One-shot	
Titans: Beast World	Waller Rising	#1	Feb 2024	One-shot	
Titans: Beast World Tour	Atlantis	#1	Mar 2024	One-shot	
Titans: Beast World Tour	Central City	#1	Feb 2024	One-shot	
Titans: Beast World Tour	Gotham	#1	Feb 2024	One-shot	
Titans: Beast World Tour	Metropolis	#1	Feb 2024	One-shot	
Titans: Beast World Tour	Star City	#1	Mar 2024	One-shot	
Titans: Burning Rage		#1–7	Oct 2019 – Apr 2020	Limited series	
Titans East Special		#1	Jan 2008	One-shot	
Titans Hunt		#1–8	Dec 2015 – Jul 2016	Limited series	
Titans/Legion of Super-Heroes: Universe Ablaze		#1–4	Jan 2000 – Apr 2000	Limited series	
Titans: Scissors, Paper, Stone			1997	Elseworlds one-shot	
Titans Sell-Out Special		#1	Nov 1992	One-shot	
Titans United		#1–7	Nov 2021 – May 2022	Limited series	
Titans United	Bloodpact	#1–6	Nov 2022 – Apr 2023	Limited series	
Titans: Villains For Hire Special		#1	Jul 2010	One-shot	
Titans/Young Justice: Graduation Day		#1–3	Jul 2003 – Aug 2003	Limited series	
Toe Tags Featuring George A. Romero		#1–6	Dec 2004 – May 2005	Limited series	
Tomahawk		#1–140	Sep/Oct 1950 – May/Jun 1972		
Tor	vol. 1	#1–6	May/Jun 1975 – Mar/Apr 1976		
Tor	vol. 2	#1–6	May 2008 – Oct 2008	Limited series	
Total Justice		#1–3	Oct 1996 – Nov 1996	Limited series	
Total Recall		#1	1990	One-shot movie adaptation	
Trial of the Amazons		#1–2	May 2022 – Jun 2022	Limited series	
Trial of the Amazons	Wonder Girl	#1–2	May 2022 – Jun 2022	Limited series	
Trials of Shazam		#1–12	Oct 2006 – May 2008	Limited series	
Trigger Twins		#1	Mar/Apr 1973	One-shot	
Trinity	vol. 1	#1–52	Jun 2008 – May 2009	Weekly limited series	
Trinity	vol. 2	#1–22	Nov 2016 – Jun 2018		
Trinity	vol. 2	Annual #1	Jul 2017		
Trinity: Daughter of Wonder Woman		#1–6	Aug 2025 – Feb 2026	Limited series	
Trinity of Sin		#1–6	Dec 2014 – May 2015		
Trinity of Sin: Pandora		#1–14	Aug 2013 – Oct 2014		
Trinity of Sin: Pandora		Futures End #1	Nov 2014		
Trinity of Sin: Phantom Stranger		#9–22	Aug 2013 – Oct 2014	Formerly Phantom Stranger (vol. 4)	
Trinity of Sin: Phantom Stranger		Futures End #1	Nov 2014	Formerly Phantom Stranger (vol. 4)	
Trinity Special		#1	Mar 2024	One-shot	
Trinity Special	World's Finest	#1	Nov 2024	One-shot	
Triumph		#1–4	Jun 1995 – Sep 1995	Limited series	
Trouble Magnet		#1–4	Feb 2000 – May 2000	Limited series	
Truth & Justice		#1–7	Apr 2021 – Oct 2021	Limited series	
TSR Worlds		Annual #1	1990	TSR One-shot	
TV Screen Cartoons		#129–138	Jul/Aug 1959 – Jan/Feb 1961	Formerly Real Screen Comics (1945 series)	
Twilight		#1–3	Dec 1990 – Feb 1991	Limited series	
Two-Face		#1–6	Feb 2025 – Jul 2025	Limited series	
Two-Face: Year One		#1–2	Sep 2008 – Oct 2008	Limited series	

== U ==
Title	Series	Issues	Dates	Notes	Reference
The Uncanny X-Men and the New Teen Titans		#1	Jan 1982	One-shot; co-published with Marvel	
Uncharted		#1–6	Jan 2012 – Jun 2012	Limited series	
Uncle Sam and the Freedom Fighters	vol. 1	#1–8	Sep 2006 – Apr 2007	Limited series	
Uncle Sam and the Freedom Fighters	vol. 2	#1–8	Nov 2007 – Jun 2008	Limited series	
Under the Moon: A Catwoman Tale			2019	Graphic novel; published under the DC Ink imprint	
Underworld		#1–4	Dec 1987 – Mar 1988	Limited series	
Underworld Unleashed		#1–3	Nov 1995 – Dec 1995	Limited series	
Underworld Unleashed	Abyss-Hell's Sentinel	#1	Dec 1995	One-shot	
Underworld Unleashed	Apokolips: Dark Uprising	#1	Nov 1995	One-shot	
Underworld Unleashed	Batman: Devil's Asylum	#1	Nov 1995	One-shot	
Underworld Unleashed	Patterns of Fear	#1	Dec 1995	One-shot	
Unearthed: A Jessica Cruz Story			2021	Graphic novel	
The Unexpected (1968)		#105–222	Feb/Mar 1968 – May 1982	Formerly Tales of the Unexpected	
The Unexpected (2018)		#1–8	Aug 2018 – Mar 2019		
Unknown Soldier	vol. 1	#205–268	Apr/May 1977 – Oct 1982	Formerly Star Spangled War Stories	
Unknown Soldier	vol. 2	#1–12	Winter 1988 – Dec 1989	Limited series; titled The Unknown Soldier; future volumes published under the Vertigo imprint	
Unlimited Access		#1–4	Dec 1997 – Mar 1998	Limited series; co-published with Marvel	
Unstoppable Doom Patrol		#1–7	May 2023 – Dec 2023	Limited series	
The Untold Legend of the Batman		#1–3	Jul 1980 – Sep 1980	Limited series	
Untold Tales of Blackest Night		#1	Dec 2010	One-shot	

== V ==
Title	Series	Issues	Dates	Notes	Reference
V		#1–18	Feb 1985 – Jul 1986		
V for Vendetta		#1–10	Sep 1988 – May 1989	Limited series	
Valor		#1–23	Nov 1992 – Sep 1994		
The Vampire Diaries		#1–6	Mar 2014 – Aug 2014		
Vext		#1–6	Mar 1999 – Aug 1999		
Victor and Nora: A Gotham Love Story			2020	Graphic novel	
The Vigil		#1–6	Jul 2023 – Jan 2024	Limited series	
Vigilante	vol. 1	#1–50	Nov 1983 – Feb 1988		
Vigilante	vol. 1	Annual #1–2	1985 – 1986		
Vigilante	vol. 2	#1–6	Nov 2005 – Apr 2006	Limited series	
Vigilante	vol. 3	#1–12	Feb 2009 – Jan 2010		
Vigilante: City Lights, Prairie Justice		#1–4	Nov 1995 – Feb 1996	Limited series	
Vigilante: Southland		#1–6	Dec 2016 – Feb 2017 (#1–3); Jan 2018 (#4–6)	Limited series; only 3 of scheduled 6 issues were initially released; issues #4–6 were published in trade paperback collection	
Viking Glory - The Viking Prince			1991	Graphic novel	
Villains United		#1–6	Jul 2005 – Dec 2005	Limited series	
Villains United	Infinite Crisis Special	#1	Jun 2006	One-shot	
Viper		#1–4	Aug 1994 – Nov 1994	Limited series	
Vixen: Return of the Lion		#1–5	Dec 2008 – Apr 2009	Limited series	
Voodoo		#0–12	Nov 2011 – Nov 2012	Issue #0 was published after #12 as final issue of series	

== W ==
Title	Series	Issues	Dates	Notes	Reference
Wacky Raceland		#1–6	Aug 2016 – Jan 2017	Limited series	
Waller vs. Wildstorm		#1–4	May 2023 – Feb 2024	Limited series; published under the DC Black Label imprint	
The Wanderers		#1–13	Jun 1988 – Apr 1989		
Wanted, the World's Most Dangerous Villains		#1–9	Aug 1972 – Sep 1973		
War for Earth-3		#1–2	May 2022	Limited series	
War of the Gods		#1–4	Sep 1991 – Dec 1991	Limited series	
War of the Green Lanterns: Aftermath		#1–2	Sep 2011 – Oct 2011	Limited series	
The War that Time Forgot		#1–12	May 2008 – Apr 2009	Limited series	
Warlord	vol. 1	#1–133	Jan/Feb 1976 – Winter 1988		
Warlord	vol. 1	Annual #1–6	1982 – 1987		
Warlord	vol. 2	#1–6	Jan 1992 – Jun 1992	Limited series	
Warlord	vol. 3	#1–10	Apr 2006 – Jan 2007		
Warlord	vol. 4	#1–16	Jun 2009 – Sep 2010		
Wasteland		#1–18	Dec 1987 – May 1989		
Watchmen		#1–12	Sep 1986 – Oct 1987	Limited series	
We Are Robin		#1–12	Aug 2015 – Jul 2016		
We Found a Monster			2021	Graphic novel	
The Web		#1–10	Nov 2009 – Aug 2010		
Wednesday Comics		#1–12	Jul 2009 – Sep 2009	Weekly limited series	
The Weird		#1–4	Apr 1988 – Jul 1988	Limited series	
Weird Mystery Tales		#1–24	Jul/Aug 1972 – Nov 1975		
Weird Secret Origins			Oct 2004	80-Page Giant one-shot	
Weird War Tales		#1–124	Sep/Oct 1971 – Jun 1983	See also Vertigo series	
Weird War Tales (War One-shot)		#1	Nov 2010	One-shot	
Weird Western Tales		#12–70	Jun/Jul 1972 – Aug 1980	Formerly All-Star Western (vol. 2)	
Weird Western Tales		#71	Mar 2010	Blackest Night tie-in	
Weird Worlds	vol. 1	#1–10	Aug/Sep 1972 – Oct/Nov 1974		
Weird Worlds	vol. 2	#1–6	Mar 2011 – Aug 2011	Limited series	
Welcome Back, Kotter		#1–10	Nov 1976 – Mar/Apr 1978	DC-TV comic	
Wesley Dodds: The Sandman		#1–6	Dec 2023 – May 2024	Limited series	
Western Comics		#1–85	Jan/Feb 1948 – Jan/Feb 1961		
Where in the World is Carmen Sandiego?		#1–4	Jun 1996 – Jan 1997	Limited series	
Whistle: A New Gotham City Hero			2021	Graphic novel	
Who's Who in Star Trek		#1–2	Mar 1987 – Apr 1987	Limited series	
Who's Who in the DC Universe		#1–16	Aug 1990 – Feb 1992	Limited series	
Who's Who in the DC Universe: Update 1993		#1–2	Dec 1992 – Jan 1993	Limited series	
Who's Who in the Legion of Super-Heroes		#1–7	Apr 1988 – Nov 1988	Limited series	
Who's Who: The Definitive Directory of the DC Universe		#1–26	Mar 1985 – Apr 1987	Limited series	
Who's Who: Update '87		#1–5	Aug 1987 – Dec 1987	Limited series	
Who's Who: Update '88		#1–4	Aug 1988 – Nov 1988	Limited series	
Wild Dog		#1–4	Sep 1987 – Dec 1987	Limited series	
Wild Dog Special		#1	1989	One-shot	
The Wild Storm		#1–24	Apr 2017 – Sep 2019	Limited series	
The Wild Storm: Michael Cray		#1–12	Dec 2017 – Dec 2018	Limited series	
WildC.A.T.s		#1–12	Jan 2023 – Jan 2024		
Wildstorm 30th Anniversary Special		#1	Jan 2023	One-shot	
Windy and Willy		#1–4	May/Jun 1969 – Nov/Dec 1969		
The Witching Hour		#1–85	Feb/Mar 1969 – Oct 1978	See also Vertigo	
Wonder Girl	vol. 1	#1–6	Nov 2007 – Apr 2008	Limited series	
Wonder Girl	vol. 2	#1	Mar 2011	One-shot	
Wonder Girl	vol. 3	#1–7	Jul 2021 – Mar 2022		
Wonder Girl	vol. 3	2022 Annual	2022		
Wonder Twins		#1–12	Apr 2019 – Apr 2020	Limited series; published under the Wonder Comics pop-up imprint	
Wonder Woman	vol. 1	#1–329	Summer 1942 – Feb 1986		
Wonder Woman	vol. 2	#1–226	Feb 1987 – Apr 2006		
Wonder Woman	vol. 2	#0	Oct 1994	Zero Hour tie-in	
Wonder Woman	vol. 2	#1,000,000	Nov 1998	DC One Million tie-in	
Wonder Woman	vol. 2	80-Page Giant #1	2003		
Wonder Woman	vol. 2	Annual #1–8	1988 – 1999		
Wonder Woman	vol. 2	Plus #1	Jan 1997		
Wonder Woman	vol. 2	Secret Files #1–3	1998 – 2000		
Wonder Woman	vol. 2	Special #1	1992		
Wonder Woman	vol. 3	#1–44, 600–614	Aug 2006 – Jul 2010; Aug 2010 – Aug 2011	Took the combined numbering of previous volumes after issue #44	
Wonder Woman	vol. 3	Annual #1	2007		
Wonder Woman	vol. 4	#0–52	Nov 2011 – Jul 2016	Issue #0 was published between #12 and #13	
Wonder Woman	vol. 4	23.1–23.2	Nov 2013	Forever Evil tie-ins	
Wonder Woman	vol. 4	Annual #1	2015		
Wonder Woman	vol. 4	Futures End #1	Nov 2014		
Wonder Woman	vol. 5	#1–83, 750–800	Aug 2016 – Aug 2023	Took the combined numbering of previous volumes after issue #83	
Wonder Woman	vol. 5	Annual #1–4	2017 – 2020		
Wonder Woman	vol. 5	2021 Annual	2021		
Wonder Woman	vol. 5	Rebirth #1	Aug 2016		
Wonder Woman	vol. 6	#1–	Nov 2023 – present		
Wonder Woman	vol. 6	2026 Annual: Wonder War – The Matriarch Special #1	Nov 2026		
Wonder Woman	vol. 6	Outlaw Edition #1	Jan 2024	One-shot; Reprinting of issues #1–2	
Wonder Woman 75th Anniversary Special		#1	Dec 2016	One-shot	
Wonder Woman '77 Meets The Bionic Woman		#1–6	Dec 2016 – Sep 2017	Limited series; co-published with Dynamite Entertainment	
Wonder Woman '77 Special		#1–4	Jun 2015 – Nov 2016	Limited series	
Wonder Woman 80th Anniversary 100-Page Super Spectacular		#1	Dec 2021	One-shot	
The Wonder Woman 100 Project			2017	One-shot	
Wonder Woman 1984		#1	Nov 2020	One-shot; movie tie-in	
Wonder Woman: Amazonia			Nov 1997	Elseworlds one-shot	
Wonder Woman and Justice League Dark: The Witching Hour		#1	Dec 2018	One-shot	
Wonder Woman Black & Gold		#1–6	Aug 2021 – Jan 2022	Limited series	
Wonder Woman: Black & Gold 2026 Special		#1	Mar 2026	One-shot	
Wonder Woman: Come Back to Me		#1–6	Sep 2019 – Feb 2020	Limited series	
Wonder Woman/Conan		#1–6	Nov 2017 – Apr 2018	Limited series; co-published with Dark Horse Comics	
Wonder Woman: Dead Earth		#1–4	Feb 2020 – Oct 2020	Limited series; published under the DC Black Label imprint	
Wonder Woman: Donna Troy		#1	Jun 1998	One-shot; part of the GirlFrenzy! series	
Wonder Woman: Earth One	vol. 1		2016	Graphic novel	
Wonder Woman: Earth One	vol. 2		2018	Graphic novel	
Wonder Woman: Earth One	vol. 3		2021	Graphic novel	
Wonder Woman: Evolution		#1–8	Jan 2022 – Sep 2022	Limited series	
Wonder Woman Gallery			1996	One-shot	
Wonder Woman Historia: The Amazons		#1–3	Jan 2022 – Feb 2023	Limited series; published under the DC Black Label imprint	
Wonder Woman: Our Worlds at War		#1	Oct 2001	One-shot	
Wonder Woman: Spirit of Truth			2001	Graphic novel	
Wonder Woman: Steve Trevor		#1	Aug 2017	One-shot	
Wonder Woman/Tasmanian Devil Special		#1	Aug 2017	One-shot	
Wonder Woman: Tempest Tossed			2020	Graphic novel	
Wonder Woman: The Adventures of Young Diana Special		#1	Dec 2021	One-shot	
Wonder Woman: The Blue Amazon			Sep 2003	Elseworlds one-shot	
Wonder Woman: The Hiketeia			2002	Graphic novel	
Wonder Woman: The Once and Future Story			1998	One-shot	
Wonder Woman: The True Amazon			2016	Graphic novel	
Wonder Woman: Uncovered		#1	Dec 2024	One-shot	
Wonder Woman: Warbringer			2020	Graphic novel	
Wonderful Women of the World			2021	Graphic novel	
World of Krypton	vol. 1	#1–3	Jul 1979 – Sep 1979	Limited series	
World of Krypton	vol. 2	#1–4	Dec 1987 – Mar 1988	Limited series	
World of Krypton	vol. 3	#1–6	Feb 2022 – Jul 2022	Limited series	
World of Metropolis		#1–4	Aug 1988 – Nov 1988	Limited series	
World of Smallville		#1–4	Apr 1988 – Jul 1988	Limited series	
World of Warcraft: Dark Riders			2013	Graphic novel; published under the DC Entertainment imprint	
World of Warcraft: Pearl of Pandaria			2012	Graphic novel; published under the DC Entertainment imprint	
World War III		#1–4	Jun 2007	Limited series	
World Without End		#1–6	Nov 1990 – Apr 1991	Limited series	
World's Best Comics		#1	Spring 1941	Becomes World's Finest Comics	
World's Best Comics: Golden Age Sampler			2003	One-shot	
World's Best Comics: Silver Age Sampler			2004	One-shot	
World's Finest	vol. 1	#1–3	Aug 1990 – Oct 1990	Limited series	
World's Finest	vol. 2	#1–4	Dec 2009 – Mar 2010	Limited series	
World's Finest Comics		#2–323	Summer 1941 – Jan 1986	Formerly World's Best Comics	
World's Finest: Our Worlds at War		#1	Oct 2001	One-shot	
World's Finest: Teen Titans		#1–6	Sep 2023 – Feb 2024	Limited series	
Worlds Collide		#1	Jul 1994	Milestone crossover	
Worlds' Finest		#0–32	Jul 2012 – May 2015	Issue #0 was published between #4 and #5	
Worlds' Finest		Annual #1	Mar 2014		
Worlds' Finest		Futures End #1	Nov 2014		
Wrath of the Spectre		#1–4	May 1988 – Aug 1988	Limited series	

== X ==
Title	Series	Issues	Dates	Notes	Reference
Xenobrood		#0–6	Oct 1994 – Apr 1995	Limited series	
Xer0		#1–12	May 1997 – Apr 1998		
Xombi		#1–6	May 2011 – Oct 2011	Previous series published under the Milestone imprint	

== Y ==
Title	Series	Issues	Dates	Notes	Reference
Yeah!		#1–9	Oct 1999 – Jun 2000	Limited series	
Year of The Villain: Hell Arisen		#1–4	Feb 2020 – May 2020	Limited series	
Year One: Batman/Ra's al Ghul		#1–2	Jun 2005 – Jul 2005	Limited series	
Year One: Batman/Scarecrow		#1–2	Jul 2005 – Aug 2005	Limited series	
You Brought Me the Ocean			2020	Graphic novel	
You're a Superhero!			2026	Graphic novel	
Young Alfred: Pain in the Butler			2023	Graphic novel	
Young All-Stars		#1–31	Jun 1987 – Nov 1989		
Young All-Stars		Annual #1	1988	Story continues in Infinity Inc. Annual #2	
Young Heroes in Love		#1–17	Jun 1997 – Oct 1998		
Young Heroes in Love		#1,000,000	Nov 1998	DC One Million tie-in	
Young Justice	vol. 1	#1–55	Sep 1998 – May 2003		
Young Justice	vol. 1	#1,000,000	Nov 1998	DC One Million tie-in	
Young Justice	vol. 1	80-Page Giant #1	May 1999		
Young Justice	vol. 1	Secret Files #1	Jan 1999		
Young Justice	vol. 2	#0–25	Mar 2011 – Apr 2013	Based on the TV series	
Young Justice	vol. 3	#1–20	Mar 2019 – Jan 2021	Published under the Wonder Comics pop-up imprint	
Young Justice in No Man's Land		#1	Jul 1999	One-shot	
Young Justice: Our Worlds at War		#1	Nov 2001	One-shot	
Young Justice: Sins of Youth		#1–2	May 2000	Limited series	
Young Justice: Targets		#1–6	Sep 2022 – Feb 2023	Limited series	
Young Justice: The Secret		#1	Jun 1998	One-shot; part of the GirlFrenzy! series	
Young Love		#39–126	Sep/Oct 1963 – Jul 1977	Earlier issues published by Prize Comics. Numbering follows on from the first series, not the second.	
Young Monsters in Love		#1	Apr 2018	One-shot	
Young Romance		#125–208	Aug/Sep 1963 – Nov/Dec 1975	Earlier issues published by Prize Comics	
Young Romance: The New 52 Valentine's Day Special		#1	Apr 2013	One-shot	

== Z ==
Title	Series	Issues	Dates	Notes	Reference
Zatanna	vol. 1	#1–4	Jul 1993 – Oct 1993	Limited series	
Zatanna	vol. 2	#1–16	Jul 2010 – Aug 2011		
Zatanna	vol. 3	#1–6	Apr 2025 – Sep 2025	Limited series	
Zatanna	vol. 4	#1–	Jun 2026 – present		
Zatanna and the House of Secrets			2020	Graphic novel	
Zatanna: Bring Down the House		#1–5	Aug 2024 – Dec 2024	Limited series; published under the DC Black Label imprint	
Zatanna Special		#1	1987	One-shot	
Zatanna: The Jewel of Gravesend			2022	Graphic novel	
Zero Hour 30th Anniversary Special		#1	Oct 2024	One-shot	
Zero Hour: Crisis in Time		#4–0	Sep 1994	Weekly limited series; numbered backwards.	

== See also ==
- List of current DC Comics publications
- List of DC Comics reprint collections
- List of DC Archive Editions
- List of DC Comics imprint publications
- List of Elseworlds publications

DC Comics has also published titles under other imprints (chiefly Vertigo, Milestone, WildStorm, ABC, Paradox Press, Amalgam, DC Focus, Johnny DC, Tangent, CMX, Impact, Helix, Minx, and Homage) along with a number of reprints.
