= List of DC Comics publications (K–O) =

DC Comics is one of the largest comic book publishers in North America. DC has published comic books under a number of different imprints and corporate names. This is a list of all series, mini-series, limited series, one-shots and graphic novels published under the imprints DC or AA, and published by National Periodical Publications, National Comics Publications, All-American Comics, Inc., National Allied Publications, Detective Comics, Inc., and related corporate names, as well as imprints publishing titles directly related to the DC Universe characters and continuity, such as Elseworlds and DC Black Label. The list does not include collected editions; trade paperbacks; digital comics; free, promotional giveaways; or magazines, nor does it include series from imprints mainly publishing titles that are separate from the DC Universe continuity, such as Vertigo or WildStorm; series published under those imprints that are related to the DC Universe continuity are noted, but not listed.

While generally the most recognizable name of a comic is printed on the cover, the cover title can be changed for a number of reasons. For example, Action Comics has frequently been listed as Action Comics featuring Superman or Superman in Action Comics, or even on occasion Supergirl in Action Comics. The official name, however, is found in the indicia, in small print inside the comics.

- List of DC Comics publications (A–B)
- List of DC Comics publications (C–F)
- List of DC Comics publications (G–J)
- List of DC Comics publications (P–S)
- List of DC Comics publications (T–Z)

== K ==
Title	Series	Issues	Dates	Notes	Reference
Kamandi: At Earth's End		#1–6	Jun 1993 – Nov 1993	Elseworlds limited series	
The Kamandi Challenge		#1–12	Mar 2017 – Feb 2018	Limited series	
The Kamandi Challenge		Special #1	Mar 2017		
Kamandi: The Last Boy on Earth		#1–59	Oct/Nov 1972 – Oct 1978	#60 & 61 appear in Cancelled Comic Cavalcade	
Kanga-U: Lost in a Labyrinth			2026	Graphic novel	
Kanga-U: Tests and Tournaments			2025	Graphic novel	
Kanga-U: Tricks and Transformation			2026	Graphic novel	
Karate Kid		#1–15	Mar/Apr 1976 – Jul/Aug 1978		
Katana		#1–10	Apr 2013 – Feb 2014		
The Kents		#1–12	Aug 1997 – Jul 1998	Limited series	
Kentucky Fried Chicken Presents...	Across the Universe	#1	Jul 2017	One-shot	
Kentucky Fried Chicken Presents...	Colonel Corps: Crisis of Infinite Colonels	#1	Jul 2016	One-shot	
Kentucky Fried Chicken Presents...	The Colonel of Two Worlds	#1	Dec 2015	One-shot	
Kid Eternity		#1–3	Apr 1991 – Oct 1991	Limited series; vol. 2 published under the Vertigo imprint	
Kid Flash: Going Rogue			2026	Graphic novel	
The Kingdom		#1–2	Feb 1999	Limited series	
The Kingdom	Kid Flash	#1	Feb 1999	One-shot	
The Kingdom	Nightstar	#1	Feb 1999	One-shot	
The Kingdom	Offspring	#1	Feb 1999	One-shot	
The Kingdom	Planet Krypton	#1	Feb 1999	One-shot	
The Kingdom	Son of the Bat	#1	Feb 1999	One-shot	
Kingdom Come		#1–4	May 1996 – Aug 1996	Elseworlds Limited series	
Kissyfur		#1	Sep 1989	One-shot	
Klarion		#1–6	Dec 2014 – May 2015		
Kneel Before Zod		#1–8	Mar 2024 – Oct 2024	Limited series	
Knight and Squire		#1–6	Oct 2010 – Mar 2011	Limited series	
Knight Terrors		#1–4	Sep 2023 – Oct 2023	Limited series	
Knight Terrors	Action Comics	#1–2	Sep 2023 – Oct 2023	Limited series	
Knight Terrors	Angel Breaker	#1–2	Sep 2023 – Oct 2023	Limited series	
Knight Terrors	Batman	#1–2	Sep 2023 – Oct 2023	Limited series	
Knight Terrors	Black Adam	#1–2	Sep 2023 – Oct 2023	Limited series	
Knight Terrors	Catwoman	#1–2	Sep 2023 – Oct 2023	Limited series	
Knight Terrors	Detective Comics	#1–2	Sep 2023 – Oct 2023	Limited series	
Knight Terrors	First Blood	#1	Sep 2023	One-shot	
Knight Terrors	Green Lantern	#1–2	Sep 2023 – Oct 2023	Limited series	
Knight Terrors	Harley Quinn	#1–2	Sep 2023 – Oct 2023	Limited series	
Knight Terrors	Night's End	#1	Oct 2023	One-shot	
Knight Terrors	Nightwing	#1–2	Sep 2023 – Oct 2023	Limited series	
Knight Terrors	Poison Ivy	#1–2	Sep 2023 – Oct 2023	Limited series	
Knight Terrors	Punchline	#1–2	Sep 2023 – Oct 2023	Limited series	
Knight Terrors	Ravager	#1–2	Sep 2023 – Oct 2023	Limited series	
Knight Terrors	Robin	#1–2	Sep 2023 – Oct 2023	Limited series	
Knight Terrors	Shazam!	#1–2	Sep 2023 – Oct 2023	Limited series	
Knight Terrors	Superman	#1–2	Sep 2023 – Oct 2023	Limited series	
Knight Terrors	The Flash	#1–2	Sep 2023 – Oct 2023	Limited series	
Knight Terrors	The Joker	#1–2	Sep 2023 – Oct 2023	Limited series	
Knight Terrors	Titans	#1–2	Sep 2023 – Oct 2023	Limited series	
Knight Terrors	Wonder Woman	#1–2	Sep 2023 – Oct 2023	Limited series	
Knight Terrors	Zatanna	#1–2	Sep 2023 – Oct 2023	Limited series	
Kobra		#1–7	Feb/Mar 1976 – Mar/Apr 1977		
Kong the Untamed		#1–5	Jun/Jul 1975 – Feb/Mar 1976		
Korak, Son of Tarzan		#46–56	May/Jun 1972 – Feb/Mar 1974	Earlier issues published by Gold Key Comics	
Korak, Son of Tarzan		#57–59	May/Jun 1975 – Sep/Oct 1975	Becomes Tarzan Family	
Krypto: The Last Dog of Krypton		#1–5	Aug 2025 – Dec 2025	Limited series	
Krypto the Superdog		#1–6	Nov 2006 – Apr 2007	Limited series; based on the animated TV series	
Krypton Chronicles		#1–3	Sep 1981 – Nov 1981	Limited series	

== L ==
Title	Series	Issues	Dates	Notes	Reference
The L.A.W. (Living Assault Weapons)		#1–6	Sep 1999 – Feb 2000	Limited series	
L.E.G.I.O.N. '89		#1–10	Feb 1989 – Dec 1989	Becomes L.E.G.I.O.N. '90	
L.E.G.I.O.N. '90		#11–22	Jan 1990 – Dec 1990	Becomes L.E.G.I.O.N. '91	
L.E.G.I.O.N. '90		Annual #1	1990	Becomes L.E.G.I.O.N. '91	
L.E.G.I.O.N. '91		#23–34	Jan 1991 – Dec 1991	Becomes L.E.G.I.O.N. '92	
L.E.G.I.O.N. '91		Annual #2	1991	Becomes L.E.G.I.O.N. '92	
L.E.G.I.O.N. '92		#35–47	Jan 1992 – Dec 1992	Becomes L.E.G.I.O.N. '93	
L.E.G.I.O.N. '92		Annual #3	1992	Becomes L.E.G.I.O.N. '93	
L.E.G.I.O.N. '93		#48–61	Jan 1993 – Dec 1993	Becomes L.E.G.I.O.N. '94	
L.E.G.I.O.N. '93		Annual #4	1993	Becomes L.E.G.I.O.N. '94	
L.E.G.I.O.N. '94		#62–70	Jan 1994 – Sep 1994	Final story continued in R.E.B.E.L.S. #0	
L.E.G.I.O.N. '94		Annual #5	1994	Final story continued in R.E.B.E.L.S. #0	
Lab Rats		#1–8	Jun 2002 – Jan 2003		
Larfleeze		#1–12	Aug 2013 – Aug 2014		
Larry Harmon's Laurel and Hardy		#1	Jul/Aug 1972	Was supposed to be an ongoing series but only one issue was published	
The Last Days of Animal Man		#1–6	Jul 2009 – Dec 2009	Limited series	
Last Days of the Justice Society Special		#1	Jul 1986	One-shot	
The Last God		#1–12	Dec 2019 – Mar 2021	Limited series; published under the DC Black Label imprint	
The Last God	Songs of Lost Children	#1	Dec 2020	One-shot; published under the DC Black Label imprint	
The Last God	Tales From the Book of Ages	#1	Aug 2020	One-shot; published under the DC Black Label imprint; also known as The Last God Sourcebook	
Lazarus Five		#1–5	Jul 2000 – Nov 2000	Limited series	
Lazarus Planet	Alpha	#1	Mar 2023	One-shot; Part 1 of 7	
Lazarus Planet	Assault on Krypton	#1	Mar 2023	One-shot; Part 2 of 7	
Lazarus Planet	Dark Fate	#1	Apr 2023	One-shot; Part 6 of 7	
Lazarus Planet	Legends Reborn	#1	Mar 2023	One-shot; Part 4 of 7	
Lazarus Planet	Next Evolution	#1	Apr 2023	One-shot; Part 5 of 7	
Lazarus Planet	Omega	#1	Apr 2023	One-shot; Part 7 of 7	
Lazarus Planet	Revenge of the Gods	#1–4	May 2023 – Jun 2023	Limited series	
Lazarus Planet	We Once Were Gods	#1	Mar 2023	One-shot; Part 3 of 7	
Leading Comics		#1–41	Winter 1941 – Feb/Mar 1950	Becomes Leading Screen Comics	
Leading Screen Comics		#42–77	Apr/May 1950 – Aug/Sep 1955	Formerly Leading Comics	
League of Justice		#1–2	Feb 1996 – Mar 1996	Elseworlds limited series	
Leave it to Binky		#1–60	Feb/Mar 1948 – Oct 1958		
Leave it to Binky		#61–71	Jun/Jul 1968 – Feb/Mar 1970	Becomes Binky	
Legend of the Hawkman		#1–3	2000	Limited series	
Legend of the Swamp Thing: Halloween Spectacular		#1	Dec 2020	One-shot	
The Legend of Wonder Woman	vol. 1	#1–4	May 1986 – Aug 1986	Limited series	
The Legend of Wonder Woman	vol. 2	#1–9	Mar 2016 – Oct 2016	Limited series	
Legends		#1–6	Nov 1986 – Apr 1987	Limited series	
The Legends of Daniel Boone		#1–8	Nov 1955 – Oct 1956		
Legends of the Dark Claw		#1	Apr 1996	One-shot; published under the Amalgam Comics imprint in association with Marvel	
Legends of the Dark Knight	vol. 1	#1–36	Nov 1989 – Aug 1992	Becomes Batman: Legends of the Dark Knight	
Legends of the Dark Knight	vol. 1	Annual #1–2	1991 – 1992	Becomes Batman: Legends of the Dark Knight	
Legends of the Dark Knight	vol. 2	#1–13	Dec 2012 – Dec 2013		
Legends of the Dark Knight	vol. 3	#1–8	Jul 2021 – Feb 2022		
Legends of the Dark Knight 100-Page Super Spectacular		#1–5	Feb 2014 – Mar 2015		
Legends of the DC Universe		#1–41	Feb 1998 – Jun 2001		
Legends of the DC Universe		3-D Gallery #1	Dec 1998	One-shot	
Legends of the DC Universe		80-Page Giant #1–2	Sep 1998 – Jan 2000		
Legends of the DC Universe		Crisis on Infinite Earths #1	Feb 1999		
Legends of the Legion		#1–4	Feb 1998 – May 1998	Limited series	
Legends of the World's Finest		#1–3	1994	Limited series	
Legends of Tomorrow		#1–6	May 2016 – Oct 2016		
The Legion		#1–38	Dec 2001 – Oct 2004		
The Legion		Secret Files 3003	2003		
Legion Lost	vol. 1	#1–12	May 2000 – Apr 2001	Limited series	
Legion Lost	vol. 2	#0–16	Nov 2011 – Mar 2013	Issue #0 was published between #12 and #13	
The Legion of Substitute Heroes Special		#1	Jul 1985	One-shot	
Legion of Super-Heroes	vol. 1	#1–4	Feb 1973 – Aug 1973		
Legion of Super-Heroes	vol. 2	#259–313	Jan 1980 – Jul 1984	Formerly Superboy and the Legion of Super-Heroes; becomes Tales of the Legion of Super-Heroes	
Legion of Super-Heroes	vol. 2	Annual #1–3	1982 – 1984	Formerly Superboy and the Legion of Super-Heroes; becomes Tales of the Legion of Super-Heroes	
Legion of Super-Heroes	vol. 3	#1–63	Aug 1984 – Aug 1989		
Legion of Super-Heroes	vol. 3	Annual #1–4	1985 – 1988		
Legion of Super-Heroes	vol. 4	#1–125	Sep 1989 – Mar 2000		
Legion of Super-Heroes	vol. 4	#0	Oct 1994	Zero Hour tie-in	
Legion of Super-Heroes	vol. 4	#1,000,000	Nov 1998	DC One Million tie-in	
Legion of Super-Heroes	vol. 4	Annual #1–7	1990 – 1996		
Legion of Super-Heroes	vol. 4	Secret Files #1–2	Jan 1998 – Jun 1999		
Legion of Super-Heroes	vol. 5	#1–15	Feb 2005 – Apr 2006	Becomes Supergirl and the Legion of Super-Heroes.	
Legion of Super-Heroes	vol. 5	#38–50	Mar 2008 – Jan 2009	Formerly Supergirl and the Legion of Super-Heroes. Cover logo changes to Legion of Super-Heroes with #37, but indicia title only changes with #38.	
Legion of Super-Heroes	vol. 6	#1–16	Jul 2010 – Oct 2011		
Legion of Super-Heroes	vol. 6	Annual #1	Feb 2011		
Legion of Super-Heroes	vol. 7	#0–23	Nov 2011 – Oct 2013	Issue #0 was published between #12 and #13	
Legion of Super-Heroes	vol. 8	#1–12	Jan 2020 – Mar 2021		
Legion of Super-Heroes	vol. 9	#1–	Nov 2026 – present		
Legion of Super-Heroes/Bugs Bunny Special		#1	Aug 2017	One-shot	
Legion of Super Heroes in the 31st Century		#1–20	Jun 2007 – Jan 2009	Based on the animated TV series	
Legion of Super-Heroes: Millennium		#1–2	Nov 2019 – Dec 2019	Limited series	
Legion of Super-Villains		#1	May 2011	One-shot	
Legion: Science Police		#1–4	Aug 1998 – Nov 1998	Limited series	
Legion: Secret Origin		#1–6	Dec 2011 – May 2012	Limited series	
Legion Worlds		#1–6	Jun 2001 – Nov 2001	Limited series	
Legionnaires		#1–81	Apr 1993 – Mar 2000		
Legionnaires		#0	Oct 1994	Zero Hour tie-in	
Legionnaires		#1,000,000	Nov 1998	DC One Million tie-in	
Legionnaires		Annual #1–3	1994 – 1996		
Legionnaires 3		#1–4	Feb 1986 – May 1986	Limited series	
Leviathan Dawn		#1	Apr 2020	One-shot	
Lex Luthor: Diabolical Genius			2026	Graphic novel	
Lex Luthor: Man of Steel		#1–5	May 2005 – Sep 2005	Limited series	
Lex Luthor/Porky Pig		#1	Oct 2018	One-shot	
Lex Luthor: The Unauthorized Biography			Jul 1989	One-shot	
Lex Luthor: Year of The Villain		#1	Nov 2019	One-shot	
The Life Story of the Flash			1997	Graphic novel	
Life, the Universe and Everything		#1–3	1996	Limited series; novel adaptation	
The Light Brigade		#1–4	Feb 2004 – May 2004	Limited series	
Limited Collectors' Edition		#C-21–C-25, C-27, C-29, C-31–C-52, C-57, C-59	Summer 1973 – Aug 1978	Tabloid sized See also All-New Collectors' Edition and Famous First Edition	
Little Batman: Month One		#1–4	Jan 2025 – Apr 2025	Limited series	
Little Shop of Horrors		#1	Mar 1987	One-shot movie adaptation	
Lobo	vol. 1	#1–4	Nov 1990 – Feb 1991	Limited series	
Lobo	vol. 2	#1–64	Dec 1993 – Jul 1999		
Lobo	vol. 2	#0	Oct 1994	Zero Hour tie-in	
Lobo	vol. 2	#1,000,000	Nov 1998	DC One Million tie-in	
Lobo	vol. 2	Annual #1–3	1993 – 1995		
Lobo	vol. 3	#1–13	Dec 2014 – Feb 2016		
Lobo	vol. 3	Annual #1	2015		
Lobo	vol. 4	#1–	May 2026 – present		
Lobo: A Contract On Gawd		#1–4	Apr 1994 – Jul 1994	Limited series	
Lobo: Blazing Chain of Love		#1	Sep 1992	One-shot	
Lobo: Bounty Hunting for Fun and Profit			1995	One-shot	
Lobo Cancellation Special		#1	Nov 2024	One-shot	
Lobo: Chained		#1	May 1997	One-shot	
Lobo Convention Special		#1	1993	One-shot	
Lobo/Deadman: The Brave and the Bald			Feb 1995	One-shot	
Lobo: Death and Taxes		#1–4	Oct 1996 – Jan 1997	Limited series	
Lobo/Demon: Helloween		#1	Dec 1996	One-shot	
Lobo: Fragtastic Voyage			1997	One-shot	
The Lobo Gallery: Portraits of a Bastich		#1	Sep 1995	One-shot	
Lobo Goes to Hollywood		#1	Aug 1996	One-shot	
Lobo: Highway to Hell		#1–2	Jan 2010 – Feb 2010	Limited series	
Lobo: I Quit		#1	Dec 1995	One-shot	
Lobo: In the Chair		#1	Aug 1994	One-shot	
Lobo: Infanticide		#1–4	Oct 1992 – Jan 1993	Limited series	
Lobo/Judge Dredd: Psycho Bikers vs. the Mutants From Hell			1995	One-shot	
Lobo/Mask		#1–2	Feb 1997 – Mar 1997	Limited series; co-published with Dark Horse Comics	
Lobo Paramilitary Christmas Special		#1	Jan 1991	One-shot	
Lobo: Portrait of a Victim		#1	Apr 1993	One-shot	
Lobo/Road Runner Special		#1	Aug 2017	One-shot	
Lobo the Duck		#1	Jun 1997	One-shot; published under the Amalgam Comics imprint in association with Marvel	
Lobo: Unamerican Gladiators		#1–4	Jun 1993 – Sep 1993	Limited series	
Lobo Unbound		#1–6	Aug 2003 – May 2004	Limited series	
Lobo's Back		#1–4	May 1992 – Nov 1992	Limited series	
Lobo's Big Babe Spring Break Special			Spring 1995	One-shot	
Lobocop		#1	Feb 1994	One-shot	
Locke & Key/Sandman: Hell & Gone		#0–2	Feb 2021 – Nov 2021	Limited series; co-published with IDW	
Lois Lane	vol. 1	#1–2	Aug 1986 – Sep 1986	Limited series	
Lois Lane	vol. 2	#1–12	Sep 2019 – Sep 2020	Limited series	
Lois Lane and the Friendship Challenge			2020	Graphic novel	
Lois Lane Annual		#1–2	1962 – 1963		
Looney Tunes		#1–281	Apr 1994 – Jan 2025		
Looney Tunes: Back in Action			2003	One-shot movie adaptation	
Loose Cannon		#1–4	Jun 1995 – Sep 1995	Limited series	
Lords of the Ultra-Realm		#1–6	Jun 1986 – Nov 1986	Limited series	
Lords of the Ultra-Realm		Special #1	1987		
Losers Special		#1	Sep 1985	One-shot	
The Lost Carnival: A Dick Grayson Graphic Novel			2020	Graphic novel	
Lot 13		#1–5	Dec 2012 – Apr 2013	Limited series	
Love Stories		#147–152	Nov 1972 – Oct/Nov 1973	Formerly Heart Throbs	
The Low, Low Woods		#1–6	Feb 2020 – Aug 2020	Limited series; published under the DC Black Label/Hill House Comics imprint	
Lucifer	vol. 3	#14–24	Jan 2020 – May 2020 (#14–18); Jul 2020 (#19); Feb 2021 (#20–24)	Published under the DC Black Label imprint; vols. 1 & 2 and issues #1–13 of vol. 3 published under the Vertigo imprint; previously unreleased issue #19 published in collection Volume 3: The Wild Hunt; previously unreleased issues #20–24 published in collection Volume 4: The Devil At Heart	
Lumberjanes/Gotham Academy		#1–6	Jun 2016 – Nov 2016	Limited series; co-published with Boom! Studios	

== M ==
Title	Series	Issues	Dates	Notes	Reference
M.A.S.K.	vol. 1	#1–4	Dec 1985 – Mar 1986	Limited series	
M.A.S.K.	vol. 2	#1–9	Feb 1987 – Oct 1987		
MAD About DC		#1	Jun 2026	One-shot	
Madame Xanadu	vol. 1	#1	Jul 1981	One-shot; for vol. 2 see Vertigo list	
Magog		#1–12	Nov 2009 – Oct 2010		
Majestic		#1–4	Oct 2004 – Jan 2005	Limited series	
Major Bummer		#1–15	Aug 1997 – Oct 1998		
Man and Superman 100-Page Super Spectacular		#1	Apr 2019	One-shot	
Man-Bat	vol. 1	#1–2	Dec/Jan 1975 – Feb/Mar 1976		
Man-Bat	vol. 2	#1	Dec 1984	One-shot; reprints; also known as Man-Bat vs. Batman	
Man-Bat	vol. 3	#1–3	Feb 1996 – Apr 1996	Limited series	
Man-Bat	vol. 4	#1–5	Jun 2006 – Oct 2006	Limited series	
Man-Bat	vol. 5	#1–5	Apr 2021 – Aug 2021	Limited series	
The Man Called A-X		#1–8	Oct 1997 – May 1998	Limited series. An earlier series was published by Malibu Comics.	
Manhunter	vol. 1	#1	May 1984	One-shot	
Manhunter	vol. 2	#1–24	Jul 1988 – Apr 1990		
Manhunter	vol. 3	#0–12	Oct 1994 – Nov 1995		
Manhunter	vol. 4	#1–30 #31–38	Oct 2004 – Jun 2007 Jul 2008 – Mar 2009		
Manhunter Special		#1	Oct 2017	One-shot	
Mann and Superman			2000	One-shot	
The Man of Steel	vol. 1	#1–6	Oct 1986 – Dec 1986	Limited series	
The Man of Steel	vol. 2	#1–6	Jul 2018 – Sep 2018	Limited series	
Many Loves of Dobie Gillis		#1–26	May/Jun 1960 – Oct 1964		
Martian Manhunter	vol. 1	#1–4	May 1988 – Aug 1988	Limited series	
Martian Manhunter	vol. 2	#0–36	Oct 1998 – Nov 2001		
Martian Manhunter	vol. 2	#1,000,000	Nov 1998	DC One Million tie-in	
Martian Manhunter	vol. 2	Annual #1–2	1998 – 1999		
Martian Manhunter	vol. 3	#1–8	Oct 2006 – May 2007	Limited series	
Martian Manhunter	vol. 4	#1–12	Aug 2015 – Jul 2016		
Martian Manhunter	vol. 5	#1–12	Feb 2019 – Apr 2020	Limited series	
Martian Manhunter: American Secrets		#1–3	Aug 1992 – Oct 1992	Limited series	
Martian Manhunter/Marvin the Martian Special		#1	Aug 2017	One-shot	
Martian Manhunter Special		#1	May 1996	One-shot	
Masters of the Universe		#1–3	Dec 1982 – Feb 1983	Limited series	
Masters of the Universe	Origin of He-Man	#1	Mar 2013	One-shot; published under the DC Entertainment imprint	
Masters of the Universe	Origin of Hordak	#1	Jul 2013	One-shot; published under the DC Entertainment imprint	
Masters of the Universe	Origin of Skeletor	#1	Dec 2012	One-shot; published under the DC Entertainment imprint	
The Masterworks Series of Great Comic Book Artists		#1–3	Spring 1983 – Oct 1983		
'Mazing Man		#1–12	Jan 1986 – Dec 1986		
'Mazing Man		Special #1–3	1987; 1988; 1990		
Meet Angel		#7	Nov/Dec 1969	Formerly Angel and the Ape	
Men of War	vol. 1	#1–26	Aug 1977 – Mar 1980		
Men of War	vol. 2	#1–8	Nov 2011 – Jun 2012		
Mera: Queen of Atlantis		#1–6	Apr 2018 – Sep 2018	Limited series	
Mera: Tidebreaker			2019	Graphic novel; published under the DC Ink imprint	
Metal Men	vol. 1	#1–41	Apr/May 1963 – Dec/Jan 1969/70		
Metal Men	vol. 1	#42–44	Feb/Mar 1973 – Jul/Aug 1973		
Metal Men	vol. 1	#45–56	Apr/May 1976 – Feb/Mar 1978		
Metal Men	vol. 2	#1–4	Oct 1993 – Jan 1994	Limited series	
Metal Men	vol. 3	#1–8	Oct 2007 – Jul 2008	Limited series	
Metal Men	vol. 4	#1–12	Dec 2019 – Feb 2021	Limited series	
Metamorpho	vol. 1	#1–17	Jul/Aug 1965 – Mar/Apr 1968		
Metamorpho	vol. 2	#1–4	Aug 1993 – Nov 1993	Limited series	
Metamorpho: The Element Man		#1–6	Feb 2025 – Jul 2025		
Metamorpho: Year One		#1–6	Dec 2007 – Feb 2008	Limited series	
Metropolis Grove			2021	Graphic novel	
Metropolis S.C.U.		#1–4	Nov 1994 – Feb 1995	Limited series	
MGM's Marvelous Wizard of Oz		#1	1975	One-shot movie adaption; co-published with Marvel	
Michael Moorcock's Elric: The Making of a Sorcerer		#1–4	2004 – 2006	Limited series	
Midnighter	vol. 2	#1–12	Aug 2015 – Jul 2016	Vol. 1 published by Wildstorm	
Midnighter	vol. 3	2021 Annual	2021		
Midnighter and Apollo		#1–6	Dec 2016 – Mar 2017	Limited series	
The Mighty		#1–12	Apr 2009 – Mar 2010	Limited series	
The Mighty Crusaders		#1–6	Sep 2010 – May 2011	Limited series	
The Mighty Crusaders Special		#1	Jul 2010	One-shot	
Mighty Love			2003	Graphic novel	
Milestone 30th Anniversary Special		#1	May 2023	One-shot	
Milestone Forever		#1–2	Apr 2010 – May 2010	Limited series	
Milestone Returns: Infinite Edition		#0	Jul 2021	One-shot	
Milestone Universe: The Shadow Cabinet		#1–4	Jan 2025 – Apr 2025	Limited series	
Milestones in History		#1	Aug 2022	One-shot	
Millennium		#1–8	Jan 1988 – Feb 1988	Weekly limited series	
Miss Beverly Hills of Hollywood		#1–9	Mar/Apr 1949 – Jul/Aug 1950		
Miss Melody Lane of Broadway		#1–3	Feb/Mar 1950 – Jun/Jul 1950		
Mister E		#1–4	Jun 1991 – Sep 1991	Limited series	
Mister Miracle	vol. 1	#1–18	Mar/Apr 1971 – Feb/Mar 1974		
Mister Miracle	vol. 1	#19–25	Sep 1977 – Aug/Sep 1978		
Mister Miracle	vol. 2	#1–28	Jan 1989 – Jun 1991		
Mister Miracle	vol. 3	#1–7	Apr 1996 – Oct 1996		
Mister Miracle	vol. 4	#1–12	Oct 2017 – Jan 2019	Limited series	
Mister Miracle Special		#1	1987	One-shot	
Mister Miracle: The Great Escape			2022	Graphic novel	
Mister Miracle: The Source of Freedom		#1–6	Jul 2021 – Jan 2022	Limited series	
Mister Terrific		#1–8	Nov 2011 – Jun 2012		
Modesty Blaise			1994	Graphic novel	
Monkey Prince		#1–12	Apr 2022 – May 2023	Limited series	
Monolith		#1–12	Apr 2004 – Mar 2005		
More Fun		#7–8	Jan 1936 – Feb 1936	National Allied Publications; formerly New Fun; becomes More Fun Comics	
More Fun Comics		#9–127	Mar/Apr 1936 – Nov/Dec 1947	Formerly More Fun	
Mortal Kombat X		#1–12	Mar 2015 – Jan 2016	Limited series	
Mother Panic		#1–12	Jan 2017 – Dec 2017	Limited series; published under the Young Animal pop-up imprint	
Mother Panic/Batman Special		#1	Apr 2018	One-shot; published under the Young Animal pop-up imprint	
Mother Panic: Gotham A.D.		#1–6	May 2018 – Oct 2018	Limited series; published under the Young Animal pop-up imprint	
The Movement		#1–12	Jul 2013 – Jul 2014		
Movie Comics		#1–6	Apr 1939 – Sep 1939		
Movietown's Animal Antics		#24–51	Jan/Feb 1950 – Jul/Aug 1954	Formerly Animal Antics; becomes Raccoon Kids	
Mr. District Attorney		#1–67	Jan/Feb 1948 – Jan/Feb 1959		
Mr. Mxyzptlk (Villains)		#1	Feb 1998	One-shot; part of the New Year's Evil series	
Mr. Terrific: Year One		#1–6	Jul 2025 – Jan 2026	Limited series	
Ms. Tree Quarterly		#1–10	Summer 1990 – Winter 1992/3	#9–10 are titled Ms. Tree Special	
¡Mucha Lucha!		#1–3	Jun 2003 – Aug 2003		
The Multiversity		#1–2	Oct 2014 – Jun 2015	Limited series	
The Multiversity	Guidebook	#1	Mar 2015	One-shot	
The Multiversity	Mastermen	#1	Apr 2015	One-shot	
The Multiversity	Pax Americana	#1	Jan 2015	One-shot	
The Multiversity	The Just	#1	Dec 2014	One-shot	
The Multiversity	The Society of Super-Heroes: Conquerors of the Counter-World	#1	Nov 2014	One-shot	
The Multiversity	Thunderworld Adventures	#1	Feb 2015	One-shot	
The Multiversity	Ultra Comics	#1	May 2015	One-shot	
Multiversity: Harley Screws up the DCU		#1–6	May 2023 – Oct 2023	Limited series	
Multiversity: Teen Justice		#1–6	Aug 2022 – Jan 2023	Limited series	
MultiVersus: Collision Detected		#1–6	Nov 2024 – Jan 2025	Limited series; video game tie-in; also known as MultiVersus: Collision Detection	
Mutt and Jeff		#1–103	Summer 1939 – Jan 1958	Series continued by Dell Comics	
My Adventures with Superman		#1–6	Aug 2024 – Jan 2025	Limited series; based on the TV series	
My Buddy, Killer Croc			2022	Graphic novel	
My Greatest Adventure	vol. 1	#1–85	Jan/Feb 1955 – Feb 1964	Becomes Doom Patrol	
My Greatest Adventure	vol. 2	#1–6	Dec 2011 – May 2012	Limited series	
My Name is Chaos		#1–4	1992	Limited series	
My Video Game Ate My Homework			2020	Graphic novel	
Mysteries of Love in Space		#1	Mar 2019	One-shot	
Mystery in Space	vol. 1	#1–110	Apr/May 1951 – Sep 1966		
Mystery in Space	vol. 1	#111–117	Sep 1980 – Mar 1981		
Mystery in Space	vol. 2	#1–8	Nov 2006 – Jun 2007	Limited series	
The Mystery of the Meanest Teacher: A Johnny Constantine Graphic Novel			2021	Graphic novel	
Mystik U		#1–3	Jan 2018 – May 2018	Limited series	

== N ==
Title	Series	Issues	Dates	Notes	Reference
Naomi	vol. 1	#1–6	Mar 2019 – Sep 2019	Limited series; published under the Wonder Comics pop-up imprint	
Naomi	vol. 2	#1–6	May 2022 – Oct 2022	Limited series; titled Naomi: Season Two	
Nathaniel Dusk		#1–4	Feb 1984 – May 1984	Limited series	
Nathaniel Dusk II		#1–4	Oct 1985 – Jan 1986	Limited series	
National Comics (1999)		#1	May 1999	One-shot; part of The Justice Society Returns! series. Named after a 1940s Quality Comic.	
National Comics (2012)	Eternity	#1	Sep 2012	One-shot	
National Comics (2012)	Looker	#1	Oct 2012	One-shot	
National Comics (2012)	Madame X	#1	Dec 2012	One-shot	
National Comics (2012)	Rose & Thorn	#1	Nov 2012	One-shot	
The Nazz		#1–4	Oct 1990 – Jan 1991	Limited series	
Nemesis: The Impostors		#1–4	May 2010 – Aug 2010	Limited series	
The New 52: Futures End		#1–48	Jul 2014 – Jun 2015	Weekly limited series	
New Adventure Comics		#12–31	Jan 1937 – Oct 1938	Formerly New Comics; becomes Adventure Comics	
The New Adventures of Charlie Chan		#1–6	Jun 1958 – Apr 1959		
The New Adventures of Superboy		#1–54	Jan 1980 – Jun 1984		
New Book of Comics		#1–2	1936 – 1938		
New Challengers		#1–6	Jul 2018 – Dec 2018	Limited series	
The New Champion of Shazam!		#1–4	Oct 2022 – Mar 2023	Limited series	
New Comics		#1–11	Dec 1935 – Dec 1936	Becomes New Adventure Comics	
New Fun		#1–6	Feb 1935 – Oct 1935	National Allied Publications. First comic (not reprinting newspaper strips) published by DC. Becomes More Fun.	
New Gods	vol. 1	#1–11	Feb/Mar 1971 – Oct/Nov 1972		
New Gods	vol. 1	#12–19	Jul 1977 – Jul/Aug 1978	Also known as Return of the New Gods	
New Gods	vol. 2	#1–6	Jun 1984 – Dec 1984	Limited series	
New Gods	vol. 3	#1–28	Feb 1989 – Aug 1991		
New Gods	vol. 4	#1–15	Oct 1995 – Feb 1997	Story continues in Jack Kirby's Fourth World	
New Gods	vol. 5	#1–12	Feb 2025 – Jan 2026	Limited series; titled The New Gods	
New Gods Secret Files		#1	Sep 1998	One-shot	
New Gods Special		#1	Oct 2017	One-shot	
The New Golden Age		#1	Jan 2023	One-shot	
The New Golden Age	Special Edition	#1	Dec 2023	One-shot	
The New Guardians		#1–12	Sep 1988 – Sep 1989		
New History of the DC Universe		#1–4	Aug 2025 – Dec 2025	Limited series	
New History of the DC Universe	The Dakota Incident	#1	Apr 2026	One-shot	
New Suicide Squad		#1–22	Sep 2014 – Sep 2016		
New Suicide Squad		Annual #1	2015		
New Suicide Squad		Futures End #1	Nov 2014		
New Super-Man		#1–19	Sep 2016 – Mar 2018	Becomes New Super-Man and the Justice League of China	
New Super-Man and the Justice League of China		#20–24	Apr 2018 – Aug 2018	Formerly New Super-Man	
New Talent Showcase	vol. 1	#1–15	Jan 1984 – Mar 1985	Becomes Talent Showcase	
New Talent Showcase	vol. 2	#1	Jan 2017	One-shot	
New Talent Showcase	2017	#1	Jan 2018	One-shot	
New Talent Showcase	2018	#1	Jan 2019	One-shot	
New Talent Showcase	The Milestone Initiative	#1	Aug 2023	One-shot	
The New Teen Titans	vol. 1	#1–40	Nov 1980 – Mar 1984	Becomes Tales of the Teen Titans	
The New Teen Titans	vol. 1	Annual #1–2	1982 – 1983	Becomes Tales of the Teen Titans	
The New Teen Titans	vol. 2	#1–49	Aug 1984 – Nov 1988	Becomes The New Titans	
The New Teen Titans	vol. 2	Annual #1–4	1985 – 1988	Becomes The New Titans	
New Teen Titans: Games			2011	Graphic novel	
The New Titans	vol. 1	#50–130	Dec 1988 – Feb 1996	Formerly The New Teen Titans (vol. 2)	
The New Titans	vol. 1	#0	Oct 1994	Zero Hour tie-in	
The New Titans	vol. 1	Annual #5–11	1989 – 1995		
The New Titans	vol. 2	#33–	May 2026 – present	Titled New Titans; continued from Titans vol. 4	
New Year's Evil (1998)			Feb 1998	Fifth-week event series of one-shots; individual issues are listed separately	
New Year's Evil (2020)		#1	Feb 2020	One-shot	
New York World's Fair Comics		no number	1939; 1940	One-shots	
The Newsboy Legion and the Boy Commandos Special		#1	Oct 2017	One-shot	
Newstime			May 1993	One-shot	
The Next		#1–6	Sep 2006 – Feb 2007	Limited series	
The Next Batman: Second Son		#1–4	Jun 2021 – Sep 2021	Limited series	
Next Level: One Shot		#1	Oct 2026	One-shot	
The Nice House by the Sea		#1–3	Sep 2024 – Dec 2024	Limited series; published under the DC Black Label imprint; continued under the Vertigo imprint starting with issue #4	
The Nice House on the Lake		#1–12	Aug 2021 – Feb 2023	Limited series; published under the DC Black Label imprint	
Night Force	vol. 1	#1–14	Aug 1982 – Sep 1983		
Night Force	vol. 2	#1–12	Dec 1996 – Nov 1997		
Night Force	vol. 3	#1–7	May 2012 – Nov 2012	Limited series	
Nightmaster: Monsters of Rock		#1	Jan 2011	One-shot	
Nightwing	vol. 1	#1–4	Sep 1995 – Dec 1995	Limited series	
Nightwing	vol. 2	#1–153	Oct 1996 – Apr 2009		
Nightwing	vol. 2	#1,000,000	Nov 1998	DC One Million tie-in	
Nightwing	vol. 2	80-Page Giant #1	Dec 2000		
Nightwing	vol. 2	Annual #1–2	1997 – 2007		
Nightwing	vol. 2	Secret Files #1	Oct 1999		
Nightwing	vol. 3	#0–30	Nov 2011 – Jul 2014	Issue #0 was published between #12 and #13	
Nightwing	vol. 3	Annual #1	Dec 2013		
Nightwing	vol. 4	#1–	Sep 2016 – present		
Nightwing	vol. 4	Annual #1–3	2018 – 2020		
Nightwing	vol. 4	2021 – 2022; 2024 – 2025 Annual	2021 – 2022; 2024 – 2025		
Nightwing: Alfred's Return		#1	Jul 1995	One-shot	
Nightwing and Huntress		#1–4	May 1998 – Aug 1998	Limited series	
Nightwing/Magilla Gorilla Special		#1	Dec 2018	One-shot	
Nightwing: Our Worlds at War		#1	Sep 2001	One-shot	
Nightwing: The New Order		#1–6	Oct 2017 – Jan 2018	Limited series	
Nightwing: The Target		#1	Sep 2001	One-shot	
Nightwing: Uncovered		#1	Nov 2024	One-shot	
Nubia & the Amazons		#1–6	Dec 2021 – May 2022	Limited series	
Nubia & The Justice League Special		#1	Jan 2023	One-shot	
Nubia: Coronation Special		#1	Jul 2022	One-shot	
Nubia: Queen of the Amazons		#1–4	Aug 2022 – Nov 2022	Limited series	
Nubia: Real One			2021	Graphic novel	
Nubia: Too Real			2025	Graphic novel	
Nutsy Squirrel		#61–72	Sep/Oct 1954 – Nov 1957	Formerly Hollywood Funny Folks	

== O ==
Title	Series	Issues	Dates	Notes	Reference
Ocean Master: Year of The Villain		#1	Feb 2020	One-shot	
Odyssey of the Amazons		#1–6	Mar 2017 – Aug 2017	Limited series	
Old Lady Harley		#1–5	Dec 2018 – Apr 2019	Limited series	
Olympus: Rebirth		#1	Oct 2022	One-shot	
OMAC	vol. 1	#1–8	Sep/Oct 1974 – Nov/Dec 1975		
OMAC	vol. 2	#1–8	Sep 2006 – Apr 2007	Limited series	
OMAC	vol. 3	#1–8	Nov 2011 – Jun 2012	as O.M.A.C.	
OMAC: One Man Army Corps		#1–4	Jan 1991 – Apr 1991	Limited series	
The OMAC Project		#1–6	Jun 2005 – Nov 2005	Limited series	
The OMAC Project	Infinite Crisis Special	#1	May 2006	One-shot	
The Omega Men	vol. 1	#1–38	Apr 1983 – May 1986		
The Omega Men	vol. 1	Annual #1–2	1984 – 1985		
The Omega Men	vol. 2	#1–6	Dec 2006 – May 2007	Limited series	
The Omega Men	vol 3	#1–12	Aug 2015 – Jul 2016		
One-Star Squadron		#1–6	Feb 2022 – Jul 2022	Limited series	
The Oracle Code			2020	Graphic novel	
Oracle: The Cure		#1–3	May 2009 – Jul 2009	Limited series	
Orion (2000)		#1–25	Jun 2000 – May 2002		
Orion (2026)			2026	Graphic novel	
The Other History of the DC Universe		#1–5	Jan 2021 – Sep 2021	Limited series; published under the DC Black Label imprint	
Our Army at War		#1–301	Aug 1952 – Feb 1977	Becomes Sgt. Rock	
Our Army at War (War One-shot)		#1	Nov 2010	One-shot	
Our Fighting Forces		#1–181	Oct/Nov 1954 – Sep/Oct 1978		
Our Fighting Forces (War One-shot)		#1	Nov 2010	One-shot	
Outcasts		#1–12	Oct 1987 – Sep 1988	Limited series	
Outlaws		#1–8	Sep 1991 – Apr 1992	Limited series	
Outsiders	vol. 1	#1–28	Nov 1985 – Feb 1988	Titled The Outsiders	
Outsiders	vol. 1	Annual #1	1986		
Outsiders	vol. 1	Special #1	1987	Story concludes in Infinity Inc. Special #1	
Outsiders	vol. 2	#1–24	Nov 1993 – Nov 1995	Issue #1 has two versions, "alpha" and "omega"	
Outsiders	vol. 2	#0	Oct 1994	Zero Hour tie-in	
Outsiders	vol. 3	#1–50	Aug 2003 – Nov 2007		
Outsiders	vol. 3	Annual #1	2007		
Outsiders	vol. 4	#15–39	Apr 2009 – Jul 2011	Formerly Batman and the Outsiders (vol. 2)	
Outsiders	vol. 5	#1–11	Jan 2024 – Nov 2024	Limited series	
Outsiders: Five of a Kind	Katana/Shazam	#1	Oct 2007	One-shot	
Outsiders: Five of a Kind	Martian Manhunter/Thunder	#1	Oct 2007	One-shot	
Outsiders: Five of a Kind	Metamorpho/Aquaman	#1	Oct 2007	One-shot	
Outsiders: Five of a Kind	Nightwing/Boomerang	#1	Oct 2007	One-shot	
Outsiders: Five of a Kind	Wonder Woman/Grace	#1	Oct 2007	One-shot	
The Oz-Wonderland Wars		#1–3	Jan 1986 – Mar 1986	Limited series; also known as Captain Carrot and His Amazing Zoo Crew! In the Oz-Wonderland War Trilogy	

== See also ==
- List of current DC Comics publications
- List of DC Comics reprint collections
- List of DC Archive Editions
- List of DC Comics imprint publications
- List of Elseworlds publications
- List of DC Comics characters

DC Comics has also published titles under other imprints (chiefly Vertigo, Milestone, WildStorm, ABC, Paradox Press, Amalgam, DC Focus, Johnny DC, Tangent, CMX, Impact, Helix, Minx, and Homage) along with a number of reprints.
