= Margeaux Pepoy =

American comic book writer and artist

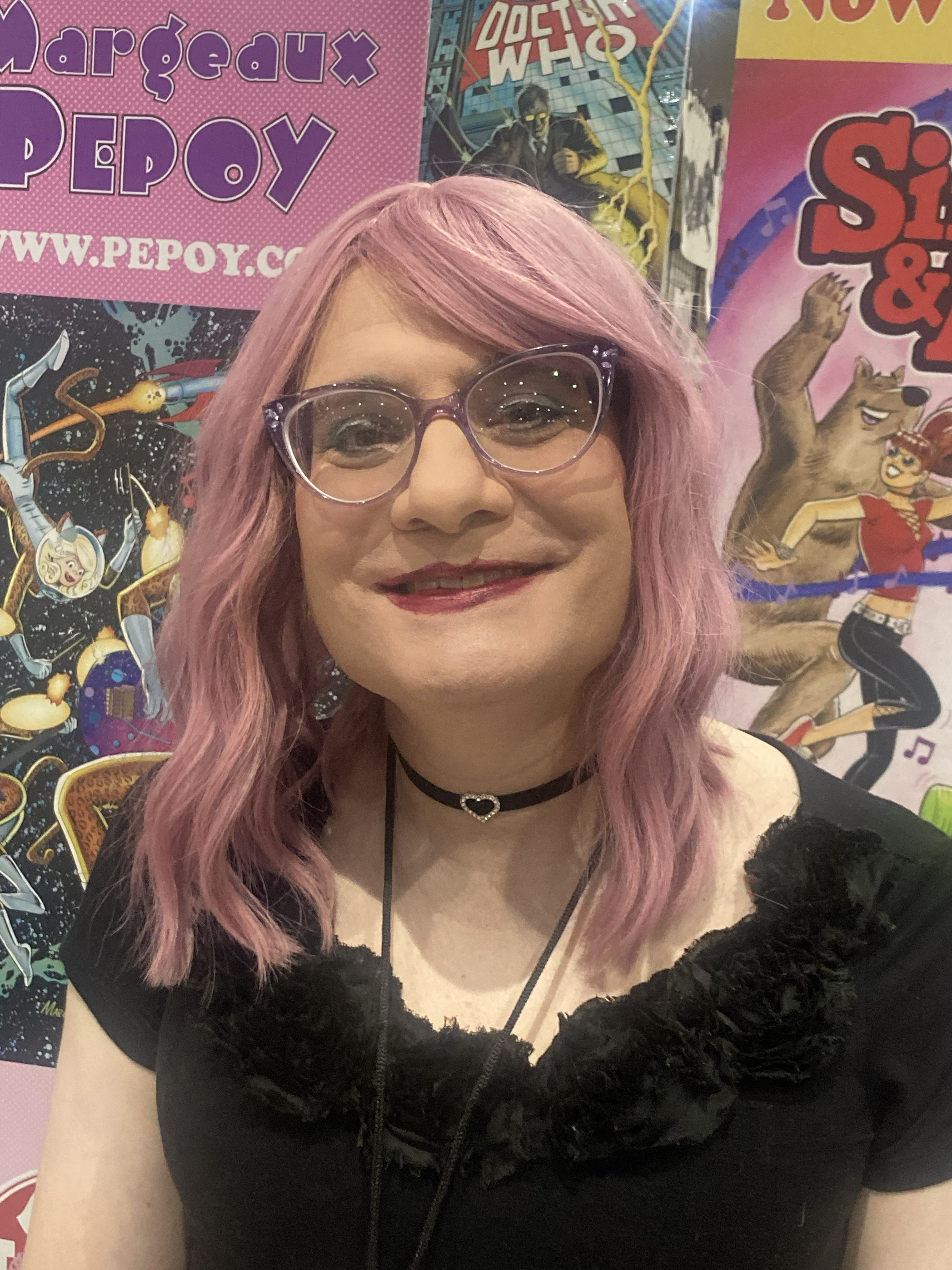
- Pepoy at her booth at the 2026 San Diego Comic-Con
- Born: Holland, Michigan
- Areas: Writer, Penciller, Artist, Inker
- Awards: Inkwell Award for The SPAMI Award (2014)

Margeaux Pepoy (née Andrew Pepoy; born 1969) is an American comic book writer and artist.

== Career ==
Pepoy began working as a professional artist while still in college at Loyola University Chicago. She got her first work in comics in 1991.

She has worked on a large variety of comics, including Superman, Spider-Man, Batman, The X-Men, Scooby-Doo, Sonic the Hedgehog, The Simpsons, Betty & Veronica, Birds of Prey, Godzilla, Ghost Rider, Star Wars, G.I. Joe, Katy Keene, and Dick Tracy.

In 2000, she redesigned the Little Orphan Annie newspaper strip, which she illustrated for the next year.

== Personal life ==
Pepoy announced via Facebook that she was taking the name Margeaux on March 16, 2026. She expressed comfort with her existing work continuing to have her prior name attached.

== Selected works ==
- Altered Image #1 (inker, 1998)
- Green Lantern: Circle of Fire Green Lantern and Power Girl (inker, 2000)
