= Green Lantern: Circle of Fire =

2000 comic book story arc

"Circle of Fire"
- Cover of Green Lantern: Circle of Fire #1 (October 2000). Art by Cary Nord and Mark Lipka.
- Publisher: DC Comics
- Publication date: October 2000
- Genre: Superhero
Title(s)
Green Lantern: Circle of Fire #1-2
Green Lantern and Adam Strange #1
Green Lantern and the Atom #1
Green Lantern and Firestorm the Nuclear Man #1
Green Lantern and Green Lantern #1
Green Lantern and Power Girl #1
Impulse #68-69
- Main character(s): Kyle Rayner; Adam Strange; Atom (Ray Palmer); Firestorm; Power Girl

Creative team
- Writer(s): Brian K. Vaughan; Jay Faerber; Judd Winick; Scott Beatty
- Penciller(s): Norm Breyfogle; Randy Greene; Trevor McCarthy; Cary Nord; Ron Randall; Robert Teranishi; Pete Woods
- Inker(s): Keith Aiken; Steve Bird; Dan Davis; Wayne Faucher; Ray Kryssing; Mark Lipka; John Lowe; Tyson McAdoo; John Nyberg; Andrew Pepoy; Claude St. Aubin; John Stanisci
- Circle of Fire: ISBN 1-56389-806-3

"Circle of Fire" is a story arc that ran through a two-issue, self-titled comic book miniseries and five one-shot comics starring Green Lantern (Kyle Rayner) that was published by DC Comics in October 2000.

It consists of two bookend issues, titled Green Lantern: Circle of Fire, and five issues in between in each of which a brand new Green Lantern Corps member pairs up with an established DC superhero. These other heroes include Power Girl, Adam Strange, Firestorm, the Atom, and Kyle. The bookend issues and two of the team-up issues were written by Brian K. Vaughan. Scott Beatty, Jay Faerber, and Judd Winick also contributed towards writing issues, while the team of artists included Keith Aiken, Steve Bird, Norm Breyfogle, Dan Davis, Wayne Faucher, Randy Greene, Ray Kryssing, Mark Lipka, John Lowe, Tyson McAdoo, Trevor McCarthy, Cary Nord, John Nyberg, Andrew Pepoy, Ron Randall, Claude St. Aubin, John Stanisci, Robert Teranishi, and Pete Woods.

Two issues of Impulse, #68-69, follow as the aftermath of the story, written by Todd Dezago with art by Eric Battle.

== Synopsis ==
Oblivion, the enigmatic being with a troubled link to Kyle Rayner and primary antagonist of the story.

The story opens with Adam Strange witnessing the entire planet Rann lapse into madness due to an attack by the cosmic entity Oblivion. As Strange tries to defend the planet, he is unwillingly transported to Earth, where he gets help from Firestorm and the Atom in alerting the JLA of Oblivion's approach. When Strange debriefs the JLA about the encounter, Kyle Rayner is shocked to hear the description of Oblivion, because it matches the description of a supervillain Kyle had created as a child for a story he made during his period of struggling his fear and anger of growing up without a father. The JLA engages Oblivion, who can create cosmic events such as black holes and dwarf stars. They are quickly overpowered, so Kyle retreats to gather other heroes to help him.

After a warning from the Spectre that someone close to Kyle would betray him, the Green Lantern asks for assistance from Oracle, who sends over Power Girl. Just as she arrives to help, six new Green Lanterns appear, each claiming to be the sole protector of Earth in a different time or universe. They are:

- Pel Tavin, the Emerald Knight, a Daxamite knight from the 13th century.
- Ali Rayner-West, Green Lightning, a descendant of Kyle and Wally West who has both a power ring and super-speed.
- Hunter and Forest Rayner, cousins and members of the Teen Lantern Corps, who are from a world where Kyle's descendants all share his original power ring.
- G.L.7177.6, a reprogrammed Manhunter android.
- Alexandra DeWitt who, in an alternate timeline, received the last power ring, only for Kyle to be murdered soon after (an inversion of Kyle's story).

Kyle splits the group of heroes up to go investigate Oblivion's arrival and rescue the captured JLA, pairing Power Girl with the Emerald Knight, Firestorm with G.L.7177.6, Green Lightning with Adam Strange, and the Atom with the Teen Lanterns. He chooses Alex to be his partner to go and hunt down Oblivion and stop him.

In Green Lantern and the Atom, the Atom and the Teen Lanterns try to figure out who created Oblivion, narrowing down the field to four suspects: the Scarecrow, Doctor Psycho, Professor Ivo, and Doctor Light, all of whom have no idea who Oblivion is. Back at Kyle's apartment, they find a sketch of a character, Sir Nobleman, who resembles the Emerald Knight in a notebook from Kyle's childhood, suggesting that Oblivion and Pel Tavin were created together.

In Green Lantern and Power Girl, the Emerald Knight and Power Girl locate the JLA on a distant planet, only to find them encapsulated in a yellow crystal. After being unable to break them free, Power Girl realizes that they are not in danger, but rather are being kept safe inside.

In Green Lantern and Adam Strange, Green Lightning and Adam Strange return to Rann only to find it in ruins, not from Oblivion's work, but from the population's madness. They discover the source of the hysteria is a giant green lantern broadcasting a signal that only Rannians can pick up. They conclude a Green Lantern must have constructed the beacon.

In Green Lantern and Firestorm the Nuclear Man, G.L.7177.6 and Firestorm search for the "Omega Option", the only thing capable of stopping Oblivion in Kyle's childhood comics. However, they are unsure if the Omega Option exists. As G.L.7177.6 and Firestorm travel through space, they encounter Martin Stein, a fire elemental who was one half of the original Firestorm. They eventually discover that the weapon does not exist.

In the last team-up book, Green Lantern and Green Lantern, Kyle and Alex deal with their conflicting emotions over each seeing their long-dead partner as they track down Oblivion. During this, Kyle finds himself mysteriously weakening. They finally find Oblivion on the ruins of Oa, so they call everyone to rendezvous.

The Circle of Fire: Kyle Rayner, Alexandra DeWitt, Pel Tavin, Ali Rayner-West, Hunter and Forest Rayner, and G.L.7177.6

As the backup arrives team-by-team, the friends fill each other in on what each team had discovered. Piecing together the clues, Kyle concludes that Pel Tavin must be the traitor that the Spectre warned about. Before the Emerald Knight and Power Girl return, however, Oblivion attacks the heroes, killing Forest. As the Atom and Hunter are about to face the same fate, the missing duo swoops in to save them. Realizing that Pel Tavin was not Oblivion after all, Kyle charges towards the supervillain, only to be transported into his own subconscious. There, he learns that Oblivion was created using the power of the ring and the negative emotions Kyle bottled up after Alex's death and that the new Green Lanterns are equally imagined, each representing a positive aspect of Kyle's subconscious; Alex is an embodiment of Kyle's capability for love, while Tavin represents his courage, Ali represents hope, G.L.7177.6 represents logic, and Hunter and Forest represent imagination.

Kyle also realizes that his current weakening state is because of subconsciously sustaining the Circle of Fire's existences with his willpower, and he eventually would die if they are not returned to him. The heroes agree and Kyle absorbs each of them to gain enough power to fight Oblivion, even Alex herself after she and Kyle bid their tearful farewells. Oblivion threatens to destroy everything Kyle loves, starting with New York City, unless Kyle lets Oblivion take over his mind and therefore the power ring. Kyle threatens suicide to stop Oblivion, but Oblivion reminds Kyle that the JLA would be lost forever. Instead, Kyle lets Oblivion into his mind, where he is overwhelmed by Kyle's positivity.

Having rescued the JLA and stopped Oblivion, Kyle tenders his resignation. Superman, Wonder Woman and Batman on the other hand interpret this to be a sign of maturity and responsibility and refuse to accept his resignation. The Spectre, who is hidden, watches this meeting and is proud of his successor. Following the meeting, Kyle is eager to look forward into the future.

== Aftermath ==
The story was followed by two issues of Impulse #68-69, serving as an epilogue. After the battle with Oblivion, Adam Strange misses his Zeta Beam due to Impulse shoving him out of the way when it appears that Strange is about to be struck by lightning; Impulse winds up being teleported to Rann himself. This situation forces Strange to seek the Justice League's aid, to which Kyle Rayner responds and takes him back to Rann. Along the way, the two try to rebuild their trust toward each other as well as repairing the damage done by Oblivion and Impulse.

This miniseries paves the way for the Green Lantern: Power of Ion storyline, in both plot and theme. Here, Kyle denies the temptation of omnipotence for altruistic reasons. In Power of Ion, Kyle is again faced with all the energy from Oblivion, becoming godlike in nature, only to give it all up.

The miniseries also deals with evolving the character of Kyle from a perennial rookie to a responsible, powerful hero in the eyes of his colleagues.

An element of the story was briefly explored on Tales of the Sinestro Corps: Parallax as Kyle once again gives into the fear and anger after the death of his mother, which this time leads to him being possessed by the fear entity Parallax instead of the return of his darker persona Oblivion. Parallax plays the same role as Oblivion with Kyle as he tortures Kyle with his own fear and doubt to continuously break his will. Kyle's childhood home has appeared once again since Circle of Fire during a battle with Parallax inside Kyle's mind.

== Reading order ==
- Green Lantern: Circle of Fire #1 (Oct. 2000)
- Green Lantern and Adam Strange #1 (Oct. 2000)
- Green Lantern and the Atom #1 (Oct. 2000)
- Green Lantern and Firestorm the Nuclear Man #1 (Oct. 2000)
- Green Lantern and Power Girl #1 (Oct. 2000)
- Green Lantern and Green Lantern #1 (Oct. 2000)
- Green Lantern: Circle of Fire #2 (Oct. 2000)

Epilogue:

- Impulse #68-69 (Jan.-Feb. 2001)
