= Mark Lipka =

Comic book artist

Mark Lipka is a comic book artist who has inked comics such as Batman, Star Wars, Justice League of America, Wolverine, Gambit & Bishop, Green Lantern, Swamp Thing, Aliens versus Predator, Daredevil, among others.

He has worked with pencillers including Cary Nord, Rick Leonardi, Yanick Paquette, Roger Petersen, Karl Waller, Adam Hughes, Toby Cypress, Rick Burchett, Steve McNiven, Steve Scott, Joe Phillips and Tom Raney.

Lipka's first professional comic work was for Rock Fantasy Comics, published by Michael Valentine Smith, in 1991, on an ultimately unpublished story in which Mick Fleetwood (of Fleetwood Mac) taught Ozzy Osbourne (Black Sabbath) the magical arts. Throughout the 1990s Lipka worked for several independent comic book publishers while working also on commercial art projects. He was mentored by friend and fellow artist Karl Waller, who lived near Lipka in Lancaster, Pennsylvania, and by Nathan Massengill (also a friend and fellow artist). Lipka's first published work with a major publisher was 1997's "Savage Dragon: Sex & Violence" for (Image). Shortly after starting The Savage Dragon book, Mark started to receive mentoring from Brian Stelfreeze.

Lipka is nicknamed "the Jackie Robinson of CrossGen comics". He was the first freelancer to work for CrossGen, who had intended to use only in-house artists on their books.
