= Wonder Comics (DC Comics) =

DC Comics imprint

- Parent company: DC Comics
- Status: Active
- Founded: 2018; 8 years ago
- Key people: Brian Michael Bendis (curator)
- Publication types: Comics
- Fiction genres: Superheroes

Wonder Comics is a pop-up imprint of DC Comics. Curated by Brian Michael Bendis, the imprint focuses on reviving old characters and original characters set in the main DC universe.

== History ==
The imprint was announced in October 2018 with one ongoing series and three miniseries, Young Justice, Naomi, Dial H for Hero, and Wonder Twins. Wonder Comics published its first and flagship book in January 2019, Young Justice.

== Titles ==
=== Season 1 ===
Title	Publication date	Issues	Initial writer(s)	Initial artist(s)
Young Justice	January 9, 2019 – November 3, 2020	1–20	Brian Michael Bendis	Patrick Gleason, John Timms
Naomi	January 23, 2019 – July 10, 2019	1–6	David F. Walker and Brian Michael Bendis	Jamal Campbell
Dial H for Hero	March 27, 2019 – February 26, 2020	1–12	Sam Humphries	Joseph A. Quinones Jr.
Wonder Twins	February 13, 2019 – February 19, 2020	1–12	Mark Russell	Stephen Byrne

=== Season 2 ===
Title	Publication date	Issues	Initial writer(s)	Initial artist(s)
Amethyst	February 26, 2020	1–6	Amy Reeder	
Jinny Hex Special	December 29, 2020	1	Magdalene Visaggio	Gleb Melnikov
