= List of Vertigo Comics publications =

Vertigo Comics is an American comic book imprint started in 1993. It is a DC Comics' imprint aimed at "mature readers", and has published many critically acclaimed titles, both company-owned, such as The Sandman and Hellblazer, and creator-owned, such as Preacher and Y: The Last Man. It was discontinued in January 2020, with ongoing series moving to the DC Black Label imprint, and future reprints were published under the new imprint. DC brought back the Vertigo imprint in 2024.

== Publications ==
=== 0–9 ===
Title	Issues	Type	Writer(s)	Artist(s)	Cover dates	Notes
100 Bullets	#1–100	Ongoing series	Brian Azzarello	Eduardo Risso	August 1999 – April 2009	Won multiple Eisner Awards and Harvey Awards from 2002 to 2004.
100 Bullets: Brother Lono	#1–8	Limited series	Brian Azzarello	Eduardo Risso	August 2013 – April 2014	Sequel series to 100 Bullets.
100 Bullets: The US of Anger	#1–TBD	TBD	Brian Azzarello	Eduardo Risso	July 2026 – present	Sequel series to 100 Bullets.
100%	#1–5	Limited series	Paul Pope		August 2002 – July 2003	
2020 Visions	#1–12	Limited series	Jamie Delano	Various	May 1997 – April 1998	

=== A ===
Title	Issues	Type	Writer(s)	Artist(s)	Cover dates	Notes
A Death Gallery	#1	One-shot		Various	January 1994	One-shot showcasing various illustrations by different artists.
Absolute Vertigo	#1	One-shot	Various	Various	winter 1995	Previews one-shot
Accelerate	#1–4	Limited series	Richard Kadrey	Jacob and Arnold Pander	August – November 2000	
Adventures in the Rifle Brigade	#1–3	Limited series	Garth Ennis	Carlos Ezquerra	October – December 2000	
Adventures in the Rifle Brigade: Operation: Bollock	#1–3	Limited series	Garth Ennis	Carlos Ezquerra	October 2001 – January 2002	
Air	#1–24	Ongoing series	G. Willow Wilson	M. K. Perker	October 2008 – October 2010	
American Carnage	#1–9	Ongoing series	Bryan Hill	Leandro Fernández, Dean White	January – September 2019	
American Century	#1–27	Ongoing series	Howard Chaykin, David Tischman	Various	May 2001 – October 2003	Issues #23–27 published under the Vertigo X imprint.
American Freak: A Tale of the Un-Men	#1–5	Limited series	Dave Louapre	Vince Locke	February – June 1994	
American Splendor	#1–4	Limited series	Harvey Pekar	Various	November 2006 – February 2007	First series
American Splendor	#1–4	Limited series	Harvey Pekar	Various	June – September 2008	Second series
American Vampire	#1–34	Ongoing series	Scott Snyder, Stephen King	Rafael Albuquerque	May 2010 – February 2013	Won the Eisner Award and the Harvey Award for Best New Series in 2011.
American Vampire Anthology	#1–2	One-shots	Various	Various	October 2013, December 2016	Anthology one-shots
American Vampire: Lord of Nightmares	#1–5	Limited series	Scott Snyder	Dustin Nguyen	August – December 2012	
American Vampire: Second Cycle	#1–11	Ongoing series	Scott Snyder	Rafael Albuquerque	May 2014 – January 2016	
American Vampire: Survival of the Fittest	#1–5	Limited series	Scott Snyder	Sean Murphy	August – December 2011	
American Vampire: The Long Road To Hell	#1	One-shot	Scott Snyder	Rafael Albuquerque	August 2013	
American Virgin	#1–23	Ongoing series	Steven T. Seagle	Becky Cloonan	May 2006 – March 2008	
The American Way: Those Above and Those Below	#1–6	Limited series	John Ridley	Georges Jeanty, Nick Filardi	September 2017 – April 2018	Previous series published by WildStorm.
Angel and the Ape	#1–4	Limited series	Howard Chaykin, David Tischman	Philip Bond	October 2001 – January 2002	Third series. See also: List of DC Comics publications
Angeltown	#1–5	Limited series	Gary Phillips	Shawn Martinbrough	January – May 2005	
Animal Man	#57–89	Ongoing series	Jamie Delano, Jerry Prosser	Various	March 1993 – November 1995	Previous issues published by DC Comics.
Animal Man	Annual #1	Ongoing series	Jamie Delano	Russel Braun, Tom Sutton, Rafael Kayanan	December 1993	Part of The Children's Crusade event.
Arcana: The Books of Magic Annual	#1	One-shot	John Ney Rieber	Peter Gross	January 1994	Part of The Children's Crusade event.
Army@Love	#1–12	Ongoing series	Rick Veitch	Gary Erskine	May 2007 – April 2008	First series
Army@Love	#1–6	Limited series	Rick Veitch	Gary Erskine	October 2008 – March 2009	Second series. Covers feature subtitle "The Art of War".
Art Ops	#1–12	Ongoing series	Shaun Simon	Michael Allred	December 2015 – December 2016	
Astro City	#1–52	Ongoing series	Kurt Busiek	Brent Anderson	August 2013 – August 2018	Third series. Previous series published by Homage Comics.

=== B ===
Title	Issues	Type	Writer(s)	Artist(s)	Cover dates	Notes
Bang! Tango	#1–6	Limited series	Joe Kelly	Adrian Sibar, Rodney Ramos	April – September 2009	
Battleaxes	#1–4	Limited series	Terry LaBan	Alex Horley	May – August 2000	
Beware the Creeper	#1–5	Limited series	Jason Hall	Cliff Chiang	June – October 2003	Second series. Published under the Vertigo X imprint. See also: List of DC Comics publications
Bite Club	#1–6	Limited series	Howard Chaykin, David Tischman	David Hahn	June – November 2004	
Bite Club: Vampire Crime Unit	#1–5	Limited series	Howard Chaykin, David Tischman	David Hahn	June – October 2006	
Black Orchid	#1–22	Ongoing series	Dick Foreman	Jill Thompson, Rebecca Guay, Jamie Tolagson	September 1993 – June 1995	Second series. See also: List of DC Comics publications
Black Orchid	Annual #1	Ongoing series	Dick Foreman	Various	December 1993	Part of The Children's Crusade event.
Black Tower: The Raven Conspiracy	#1–TBD	TBD	Ram V	Mike Perkins	August 2026 – present	
Bleeding Hearts	#1–TBD	TBD	Deniz Camp	Stipan Morian	February 2026 – present	
Blood & Water	#1–5	Limited series	Judd Winick	Tomm Coker	May – September 2003	Published under the Vertigo X imprint.
Blood and Shadows	#1–4	Limited series	Joe R. Landsdale	Mark Nelson	March – July 1996	
Blood: A Tale	#1–4	Limited series	J. M. DeMatteis	Kent Williams	November 1996 – February 1997	Reprints the Epic Comics series. Also known as Blood: A Life.
Bodies	#1–8	Limited series	Si Spencer	Meghan Hetrick, Dean Ormston, Tula Lotay, Phil Winslade	September 2014 – April 2015	
The Books of Faerie	#1–3	Limited series	Bronwyn Carlton	Peter Gross	March – May 1997	
The Books of Faerie: Auberon's Tale	#1–3	Limited series	Bronwyn Carlton	Peter Gross	August – October 1998	
The Books of Faerie: Molly's Story	#1–4	Limited series	John Ney Rieber	Hermann Mejía	September – December 1999	
The Books of Magic	#1–75	Ongoing series	John Ney Rieber, Peter Gross	Peter Gross	May 1994 – August 2000	Second series. Previous series published by DC Comics.
The Books of Magic	Annual #1–3	Ongoing series	John Ney Rieber, Peter Gross	Various	February 1997 – June 1999	Second series. Previous series published by DC Comics.
The Books of Magic	#1–13	Ongoing series	Kat Howard	Tom Fowler	December 2018 – December 2019	Third series. Published under The Sandman Universe imprint. Starting with issue #14, published under the DC Black Label imprint.
Books of Magick: Life During Wartime	#1–15	Ongoing series	Si Spencer	Dean Ormston	September 2004 – December 2005	
Border Town	#1–4	Limited series	Eric M. Esquivel	Ramon Villalobos	November 2018 – February 2019	Cancelled after issue #4, originally intended to be six issues long.
Brave Old World	#1–4	Limited series	William Messner-Loebs	Guy Davis, Phil Hester	February – May 2000	Published under the V2K imprint.

=== C ===
Title	Issues	Type	Writer(s)	Artist(s)	Cover dates	Notes
Chiaroscuro: The Private Lives of Leonardo da Vinci	#1–10	Limited series	Pat McGreal, David Rawson	Chaz Truog, Rafael Kayanan	July 1995 – April 1996	
The Children's Crusade	#1–2	Limited series	Neil Gaiman	Various	December 1993 – January 1994	Part of The Children's Crusade event.
Cinderella: Fables are Forever	#1–6	Limited series	Chris Roberson	Shawnn McManus	April – September 2011	Fables spin-off
Cinderella: From Fabletown with Love	#1–6	Limited series	Chris Roberson	Shawnn McManus	January – June 2010	Fables spin-off
Clean Room	#1–18	Ongoing series	Gail Simone	Jon Davis-Hunt, Walter Geovani, Sanya Anwar	December 2015 – June 2017	
Codename: Knockout	#0–23	Ongoing series	Robert Rodi	Various	June 2001 – June 2003	Issues #21–23 were published under the Vertigo X imprint.
Coffin Hill	#1–20	Ongoing series	Caitlin Kittredge	Inaki Miranda	December 2013 – September 2015	
Collider	#1	Ongoing series	Simon Oliver	Robbi Rodriguez	September 2013	Continued as FBP: Federal Bureau of Physics with issue #2.
Congo Bill	#1–4	Limited series	Scott Cunningham	Danijel Žeželj	October 1999 – January 2000	Second series. See also: List of DC Comics publications
Constantine: The Official Movie Adaptation	#1	One-shot	Steven T. Seagle	Ron Randall, Jimmy Palmiotti	March 2005	Adaptation of the 2005 film Constantine.
Crossing Midnight	#1–19	Ongoing series	Mike Carey	Jim Fern	January 2007 – July 2008	
Cruel and Unusual	#1–4	Limited series	Jamie Delano, Tom Peyer	John McCrea, Andrew Chiu	June – September 1999	
The Crusades	#1–20	Ongoing series	Steven T. Seagle	Kelley Jones	May 2001 – December 2002	
The Crusades: Urban Decree	#1	One-shot	Steven T. Seagle	Kelley Jones	April 2001	Prelude story to main series.
The Crying Doll	#1–TBD	TBD	Mariko Tamaki	Rosemary Valero-O'Connell	TBD 2026 – present	

=== D ===
Title	Issues	Type	Writer(s)	Artist(s)	Cover dates	Notes
The Dark & Bloody	#1–6	Limited series	Shawn Aldridge	Scott Godlewski	April – September 2016	
Daytripper	#1–10	Limited series	Gabriel Bá, Fábio Moon		February – November 2010	Won the Eisner Award for Best Limited Series and the Harvey Award for Best Single Issue or Story in 2011.
The Dead Boy Detectives	#1–12	Ongoing series	Toby Litt, Mark Buckingham	Mark Buckingham	February 2014 – February 2015	Sequel series to the graphic novel.
Deadenders	#1–16	Ongoing series	Ed Brubaker	Warren Pleece	March 2000 – June 2001	
Deadman	#1–13	Ongoing series	Bruce Jones	John Watkiss	October 2006 – November 2007	Fourth series. See also: List of DC Comics publications
Death Talks About Life	#1	One-shot	Neil Gaiman	Dave McKean	1994	Giveaway comic distributed through comic stores and other outlets.
Death: At Death's Door	#1	One-shot	Jill Thompson		September 2003	
Death: The High Cost of Living	#1–3	Limited series	Neil Gaiman	Chris Bachalo, Mark Buckingham	March – May 1993	
Death: The Time of Your Life	#1–3	Limited series	Neil Gaiman	Chris Bachalo, Mark Buckingham	April – June 1996	
Deathbed	#1–6	Limited series	Joshua Williamson	Riley Rossmo	April – September 2018	
Demo	#1–6	Limited series	Brian Wood	Becky Cloonan	April – September 2010	Second series. Previous series published by AiT/Planet Lar.
Destiny: A Chronicle of Deaths Foretold	#1–3	Limited series	Alissa Kwitney	Kent Williams	November 1997 – January 1998	
Dhampire: Stillborn	#1	One-shot	Nancy A. Collins	Paul Lee	November 1996	Prologue to cancelled ongoing series.
Django Unchained	#1–7	Limited series	Quentin Tarantino, Reginald Hudlin	R. M. Guéra, Jason Latour	February – October 2013	Adaptation of the 2012 film Django Unchained.
Django/Zorro	#1–7	Limited series	Quentin Tarantino, Matt Wagner	Esteve Polls, Brennan Wagner	November 2014 – May 2015	Co-published with Dynamite Entertainment.
DMZ	#1–72	Ongoing series	Brian Wood	Riccardo Burchielli	January 2006 – February 2012	
Dominique Laveau: Voodoo Child	#1–7	Ongoing series	Selwyn Hinds	Denys Cowan, John Floyd	May – November 2012	
Doom Patrol	#64–87	Ongoing series	Rachel Pollack	Ted McKeever, Richard Case, Linda Medley, Graham Higgins, Scot Eaton, Tom Sutton, Jamie Tolagson, Matt Howarth	March 1993 – February 1995	Second series. Previous issues published by DC Comics. See also: List of DC Comics publications
Doom Patrol	Annual #2	Ongoing series	Rachel Pollack	Mark Wheatley, Stuart Chaifetz	January 1994	Part of The Children's Crusade event. First Annual issue was published by DC Comics.
The Dreaming	#1–60	Ongoing series	Various	Various	June 1996 – May 2001	First series
The Dreaming	Special #1	Ongoing series	Various	Various	July 1998	First series
The Dreaming	#1–14	Ongoing series	Simon Spurrier	Bilquis Evely	November 2018 – December 2019	Second series. Published under The Sandman Universe imprint. Starting with issue #15, published under the DC Black Label imprint.

=== E ===
Title	Issues	Type	Writer(s)	Artist(s)	Cover dates	Notes
The Eaters	#1	One-shot	Peter Milligan	Dean Ormston	January 1996	Published under the Vertigo Voices imprint.
Effigy	#1–7	Limited series	Tim Seeley	Marley Zarcone	March – September 2015	
Egypt	#1–7	Limited series	Peter Milligan	Glyn Dillon, Roberto Corona	August 1995 – February 1996	
El Diablo	#1–4	Limited series	Brian Azzarello	Danijel Žeželj	March – June 2001	Second series. See also: List of DC Comics publications
End of Life	#1–TBD	TBD	Kyle Starks	Steve Pugh	February 2026 – present	
The Endless Gallery	#1	One-shot	Neil Gaiman	Various	June 1995	
Enigma	#1–8	Limited series	Peter Milligan	Duncan Fegredo	March – October 1993	
Essential Vertigo: Swamp Thing	#1–24	Ongoing series	Alan Moore	Various	November 1996 – October 1998	Reprints Swamp Thing (vol. 2) #21–38 in color and #39–43 in black and white.
Essential Vertigo: The Sandman	#1–32	Ongoing series	Neil Gaiman	Various	August 1996 – March 1999	Reprints The Sandman #1–32.
Everafter: From the Pages of Fables	#1–12	Ongoing series	Dave Justus, Lilah Sturges	Travis Moore	November 2016 – October 2017	Cancelled after 12 issues.
The Exterminators	#1–30	Ongoing series	Simon Oliver	Tony Moore	March 2006 – August 2008	
The Extremist	#1–4	Limited series	Peter Milligan	Ted McKeever	September – December 1993	

=== F ===
Title	Issues	Type	Writer(s)	Artist(s)	Cover dates	Notes
Fables	#1–149	Ongoing series	Bill Willingham	Various	July 2002 – April 2015	Issues #10–20 published under the Vertigo X imprint. Won the Eisner Awards for Best New Series in 2003 and Best Serialized Story in 2003, 2005 and 2006.
Fables	#150	Ongoing series	Bill Willingham	Various	September 2015	Published in trade paperback format.
Fables: The Last Castle	#1	One-shot	Bill Willingham	Craig Hamilton, P. Craig Russell	November 2003	
Fables: The Wolf Among Us	#1–16	Ongoing series	Dave Justus, Lilah Sturges	Stephen Sadowski, Shawn McManus, Travis Moore	March 2015 – June 2016	Print edition the digital-first series of the same name.
Face	#1	One-shot	Peter Milligan	Duncan Fegredo	January 1995	Published under the Vertigo Voices imprint.
Fairest	#1–33	Ongoing series	Bill Willingham, Various	Various	May 2012 – March 2015	
Faith	#1–5	Limited series	Ted McKeever		November 1999 – March 2000	
Faker	#1–6	Limited series	Mike Carey	Jock	September 2007 – February 2008	
Fanatic	#1–TBD	TBD	Grace Ellis	Hannah Templer	TBD 2026 – present	
Farewell, Moonshadow	#1	One-shot	J. M. DeMatteis	Jon J Muth	January 1997	Sequel to Moonshadow limited series.
Faultlines	#1–6	Limited series	Lee Marrs	Bill Koeb	May – October 1997	
FBP: Federal Bureau of Physics	#1–24	Ongoing series	Simon Oliver	Robbi Rodriguez, Alberto Ponticelli	September 2013 – November 2015	Originally named Collider, the title was changed beginning with issue #2. The first issue was reprinted with the new title.
Fight for Tomorrow	#1–6	Limited series	Brian Wood	Denys Cowan, Kent Williams	November 2002 – April 2003	Issue #6 published under the Vertigo X imprint.
The Filth	#1–13	Limited series	Grant Morrison	Chris Weston, Gary Erskine	August 2002 – October 2003	Issues #9–13 published under the Vertigo X imprint.
Finals	#1–4	Limited series	Will Pfeifer	Jill Thompson	September – December 1999	
Flex Mentallo	#1–4	Limited series	Grant Morrison	Frank Quitely	June – September 1996	
Flinch	#1–16	Ongoing series	Various	Various	June 1999 – January 2001	Anthology series
Four Horsemen	#1–4	Limited series	Robert Rodi	Esad Ribić	February – May 2000	Published under the V2K imprint.
Frostbite	#1–6	Limited series	Joshua Williamson	Jason Shawn Alexander, Luis NCT	November 2016 – April 2017	

=== G ===
Title	Issues	Type	Writer(s)	Artist(s)	Cover dates	Notes
Gangland	#1–4	Limited series	Various	Various	June – September 1998	
Ghostdancing	#1–6	Limited series	Jamie Delano	Richard Case	March – September 1995	
Ghosts	#1	One-shot	Various	Various	December 2012	Anthology one-shot
Gifts of the Night	#1–4	Limited series	Paul Chadwick	John Bolton	February – May 1999	
Girl	#1–3	Limited series	Peter Milligan	Duncan Fegredo	July – September 1996	Published under the Vertigo Vérité imprint.
The Girl Who Would Be Death	#1–4	Limited series	Caitlin R. Kiernan	Dean Ormston	December 1998 – March 1999	
Goddess	#1–8	Limited series	Garth Ennis	Phil Winslade	June 1995 – January 1996	
Goddess Mode	#1–6	Ongoing series	Zoë Quinn	Robbi Rodriguez, Rico Renzi	February – July 2019	
Greatest Hits	#1–6	Limited series	David Tischman	Glenn Fabry, Gary Erskine	November 2008 – April 2009	
Greek Street	#1–16	Ongoing series	Peter Milligan	David Gianfelice	September 2009 – December 2010	
Grip: The Strange World of Men	#1–5	Limited series	Gilbert Hernandez		January – May 2002	

=== H ===
Title	Issues	Type	Writer(s)	Artist(s)	Cover dates	Notes
Happydale: Devils in the Desert	#1–2	Limited series	Andrew Dabb	Seth Fisher, Laura Allred	August – September 1999	
The Haunted Tank	#1–5	Limited series	Frank Marrafino	Henry Flint	February – June 2009	
Heartland	#1	One-shot	Garth Ennis	Steve Dillon	March 1997	
Heartthrobs	#1–4	Limited series	Various	Various	January – April 1999	
Heavy Liquid	#1–5	Limited series	Paul Pope		October 1999 – February 2000	
Hell Eternal	#1	One-shot	Jamie Delano	Sean Phillips, Matt Hollingsworth	May 1998	Published under the Vertigo Vérité imprint.
Hellblazer	#63–300	Ongoing series	Various	Various	March 1993 – April 2013	First 62 issues published under DC Comics. Issues #181–191 published under the Vertigo X imprint.
Hellblazer	Special #1	Ongoing series	Garth Ennis	Steve Dillon	November 1993	
Hellblazer	Annual 2011	Ongoing series	Peter Milligan	Simon Bisley	February 2012	
Hellblazer – Special Constantine DVD Issue	#1	One-shot	Various	Various	April 2005	Extra with Constantine – 2-Disc Deluxe Edition DVD.
Hellblazer Presents: Chas – The Knowledge	#1–5	Limited series	Simon Oliver	Goran Sudžuka	September 2008 – January 2009	
Hellblazer Special: Bad Blood	#1–4	Limited series	Jamie Delano	Philip Bond	September – December 2000	
Hellblazer Special: Lady Constantine	#1–4	Limited series	Andy Diggle	Goran Sudžuka	February – May 2003	Issues #3–4 published under the Vertigo X imprint.
Hellblazer Special: Papa Midnite	#1–5	Limited series	Mat Johnson	Tony Akins, Dan Green	April – August 2005	
Hellblazer: City of Demons	#1–5	Limited series	Si Spencer	Sean Murphy	early December 2010 – February 2011	
Hellblazer/The Books of Magic	#1–2	Limited series	Paul Jenkins, John Ney Rieber	Paul Lee	December 1997 – January 1998	
Hex Wives	#1–6	Ongoing series	Ben Blacker	Mirka Andolfo	December 2018 – May 2019	
High Level	#1–6	Ongoing series	Rob Sheridan	Barnaby Bagenda	April – November 2019	
Hinterkind	#1–18	Ongoing series	Ian Edginton	Francesco Trifogli	December 2013 – July 2015	
The Horrorist	#1–2	Limited series	Jamie Delano	David Lloyd	December 1995 – January 1996	
House of Mystery	#1–42	Ongoing series	Various	Various	July 2008 – December 2011	Second series. See also: List of DC Comics publications
House of Mystery	Halloween Annual #1–2	Ongoing series	Various	Various	December 2009 – December 2010	Second series. See also: List of DC Comics publications
House of Secrets	#1–25	Ongoing series	Steven T. Seagle	Teddy Kristiansen, Various	October 1996 – December 1998	Second series. See also: List of DC Comics publications
House of Secrets: Facade	#1–2	Limited series	Steven T. Seagle	Teddy Kristiansen	May – July 2001	
House of Whispers	#1–14	Ongoing series	Nalo Hopkinson	Dominike Stanton	November 2018 – December 2019	Published under The Sandman Universe imprint. Starting with issue #15, published under the DC Black Label imprint.
Human Target	#1–4	Limited series	Peter Milligan	Edvin Biuković	April – July 1999	First series
Human Target	#1–21	Ongoing series	Peter Milligan	Various	October 2003 – June 2005	Second series. Issues #1–5 published under the Vertigo X imprint.
Hunter: The Age of Magic	#1–25	Ongoing series	Dylan Horrocks	Richard Case	September 2001 – September 2003	Issues #20–25 published under the Vertigo X imprint.

=== I ===
Title	Issues	Type	Writer(s)	Artist(s)	Cover dates	Notes
I Am Legend: Awakening	#1	One-shot	Various	Various	2007	Promotional comic for the 2007 film I Am Legend.
I Die At Midnight	#1	One-shot	Kyle Baker		February 2000	Published under the V2K imprint.
Imaginary Fiends	#1–6	Limited series	Tim Seeley	Stephen Molnar	January– June 2018	
Industrial Gothic	#1–5	Limited series	Ted McKeever		December 1995 – April 1996	
The Invisibles	#1–25	Ongoing series	Grant Morrison	Various	September 1994 – October 1996	First series
The Invisibles	#1–22	Ongoing series	Grant Morrison	Various	February 1997 – February 1999	Second series
The Invisibles	#1-12	Limited series	Grant Morrison	Various	April 1999 – June 2000	Third series. Numbering runs in reverse.
iZombie	#1–28	Ongoing series	Chris Roberson	Mike Allred	July 2010 – October 2012	

=== J ===
Title	Issues	Type	Writer(s)	Artist(s)	Cover dates	Notes
Jack of Fables	#1–50	Ongoing series	Bill Willingham, Lilah Sturges	Various	September 2006 – April 2011	Fables spin-off
Jacked	#1–6	Limited series	Eric Kripke	John Higgins	January – June 2016	
Joe the Barbarian	#1–8	Limited series	Grant Morrison	Sean Murphy	March 2010 – May 2011	
Jonah Hex: Riders of the Worm and Such	#1–5	Limited series	Joe R. Lansdale	Timothy Truman, Sam Glanzsman	March – July 1995	
Jonah Hex: Shadows West	#1–3	Limited series	Joe R. Lansdale	Timothy Truman, Sam Glanzsman	February – April 1999	
Jonah Hex: Two-Gun Mojo	#1–5	Limited series	Joe R. Lansdale	Timothy Truman, Sam Glanzsman	August – December 1993	
Jonny Double	#1–4	Limited series	Brian Azzarello	Eduardo Risso	September – December 1998	
Junk Culture	#1–2	Limited series	Ted McKeever		July – August 1997	

=== K ===
Title	Issues	Type	Writer(s)	Artist(s)	Cover dates	Notes
Kid Eternity	#1–16	Ongoing series	Ann Nocenti	Sean Phillips	May 1993 – September 1994	See also: List of DC Comics publications
Kill Your Boyfriend	#1	One-shot	Grant Morrison	Philip Bond	June 1995	Published under the Vertigo Voices imprint.
The Kitchen	#1–8	Limited series	Ollie Masters	Ming Doyle, Jordan Bellaire	January – August 2015	

=== L ===
Title	Issues	Type	Writer(s)	Artist(s)	Cover dates	Notes
Last Gang in Town	#1–6	Limited series	Simon Oliver	Rufus Dayglo	February – August 2016	
The Last One	#1–6	Limited series	J. M. DeMatteis	Dan Sweetman	July – December 1993	
The Literals	#1–3	Limited series	Bill Willingham, Lilah Sturges	Mark Buckingham	June – August 2009	Fables spin-off
The Losers	#1–32	Ongoing series	Andy Diggle	Jock	August 2003 – March 2006	Issues #1–7 published under the Vertigo X imprint.
The Lost Boys	#1–6	Limited series	Tim Seeley	Scott Godlewski	December 2016 – May 2017	Sequel to the 1987 film The Lost Boys.
Loveless	#1–24	Ongoing series	Brian Azzarello	Marcelo Frusin, Danijel Zezelj, Werther Dell'Edera	December 2005 – June 2008	
Lucifer	#1–75	Ongoing series	Mike Carey	Various	June 2000 – August 2006	First series. Issues #35–45 published under the Vertigo X imprint.
Lucifer	#1–19	Ongoing series	Holly Black, Richard Kadrey	Lee Garbett, Antonio Fabela, Stephanie Hans, Marco Rudy	February 2016 – August 2017	Second series
Lucifer	#1–13	Ongoing series	Dan Watters	Various	December 2018 – December 2019	Third series. Published under The Sandman Universe imprint. Starting with issue #14, published under the DC Black Label imprint.
Lucifer: Nirvana	#1	One-shot	Mike Carey	Jon J Muth	October 2002	

=== M ===
Title	Issues	Type	Writer(s)	Artist(s)	Cover dates	Notes
Mad Max: Fury Road: Furiosa	#1	One-shot	George Miller, Nico Lathouris, Mark Sexton	Mark Sexton, Tristan Jones, Szymon Kudranski	August 2015	Tie-in comics to the 2015 film Mad Max: Fury Road.
Mad Max: Fury Road: Mad Max	#1–2	Limited series	George Miller, Nico Lathouris, Mark Sexton	Mark Sexton, Michael Spicer	September – October 2015	Tie-in comics to the 2015 film Mad Max: Fury Road.
Mad Max: Fury Road: Nux & Immortan Joe	#1	One-shot	George Miller, Nico Lathouris, Mark Sexton	Mark Sexton, Leandro Fernández, Riccardo Burchielli, Andrea Mutti	July 2015	Tie-in comics to the 2015 film Mad Max: Fury Road.
Madame Xanadu	#1–29	Ongoing series	Matt Wagner	Amy Reeder	August 2008 – January 2011	Second series. See also: List of DC Comics publications
Midnight, Mass.	#1–8	Limited series	John Rozum	Jesús Saíz, Jimmy Palmiotti	June 2002 – January 2003	
Midnight, Mass: Here There Be Monsters	#1–6	Limited series	John Rozum	Paul Lee	March – August 2004	
Millennium Edition: Hellblazer	#1	One-shot	Jamie Delano	John Ridgway	July 2000	Reprints Hellblazer #1.
Millennium Edition: House of Mystery	#1	One-shot	Various	Various	September 2000	Reprints House of Mystery #1.
Millennium Edition: Preacher	#1	One-shot	Garth Ennis	Steve Dillon	October 2000	Reprints Preacher (comics) #1.
Millennium Edition: The Saga of the Swamp Thing	#1	One-shot	Alan Moore	Stephen R. Bissette, John Totleben	November 2000	Reprints Saga of the Swamp Thing #21.
Millennium Edition: The Sandman	#1	One-shot	Neil Gaiman	Sam Kieth, Mike Dringenberg	February 2000	Reprints The Sandman #1.
Millennium Fever	#1–4	Limited series	Nick Abadzis	Duncan Fegredo	October 1995 – January 1996	
The Minx	#1–8	One-shot	Peter Milligan	Sean Phillips	October 1998 – May 1999	
Mnemovore	#1–6	Limited series	Hans Rodionoff, Ray Fawkes	Mike Huddleston	June – November 2005	
Mobfire	#1–6	Limited series	Gary Ushaw	Warren Pleece	December 1994 – May 1995	
Moonshadow	#1–12	Limited series	J. M. DeMatteis	Jon J Muth	September 1994 – August 1995	Reprints the Epic Comics series.
Motherlands	#1–6	Limited series	Simon Spurrier	Rachael Stott	March – August 2018	
Muktuk Wolfsbreath: Hard-Boiled Shaman	#1–3	Limited series	Terry LaBan	Steve Parkhouse	August – October 1998	
My Faith in Frankie	#1–4	Limited series	Mike Carey	Sonny Liew, Marc Hempel	March – June 2004	
Mystery in Space	#1	One-shot	Various	Various	July 2012	Third series. Anthology one-shot. See also: List of DC Comics publications
Mythos: The Final Tour	#1–3	Limited series	John Ney Rieber	Various	December 1996 – February 1997	

=== N ===
Title	Issues	Type	Writer(s)	Artist(s)	Cover dates	Notes
The Names	#1–9	Limited series	Peter Milligan	Leandro Fernández, Cris Peter	November 2014 – July 2015	
The Names of Magic	#1–5	Limited series	Dylan Horrocks	Richard Case	February – June 2001	
Necretaceous	#1–TBD	TBD	Tom Taylor	Darick Robertson	TBD 2026 – present	
Neil Gaiman and Charles Vess' Stardust	#1–4	Limited series	Neil Gaiman	Charles Vess	December 1997 – May 1998	
Neil Gaiman's Neverwhere	#1–9	Limited series	Mike Carey	Glenn Fabry	August 2005 – September 2006	
Nevada	#1–6	Limited series	Steve Gerber	Phil Winslade, Steve Leialoha	May – October 1998	
The New Deadwardians	#1–8	Limited series	Dan Abnett	Ian Culbard	May – December 2012	
New Romancer	#1–6	Limited series	Peter Milligan	Brett Parson	February – July 2016	
The New York Five	#1–4	Limited series	Brian Wood	Ryan Kelly	March – June 2011	
The Nice House By The Sea	#4–8	Ongoing series	James Tynion IV	Álvaro Martínez Bueno	December 2024 – present	Second series. Previous issues published under DC Comics' Black Label imprint.
Northlanders	#1–50	Ongoing series	Brian Wood	Various	February 2008 – June 2012	

=== O ===
Title	Issues	Type	Writer(s)	Artist(s)	Cover dates	Notes
The Other Side	#1–5	Limited series	Jason Aaron	Cameron Stewart	December 2006 – April 2007	
Otherworld	#1–7	Limited series	Phil Jimenez	Andy Lanning, Jeromy Cox	May – November 2005	Announced as a 12-issue limited series, but went on hiatus after issue #7.
Outlaw Nation	#1–19	Ongoing series	Jamie Delano	Goran Sudžuka	November 2000 – May 2002	

=== P ===
Title	Issues	Type	Writer(s)	Artist(s)	Cover dates	Notes
The Peril of the Brutal Dark: An Ezra Cain Mystery	#1–TBD	TBD	Chris Condon	Jacob Phillips	February 2026 – present	
Preacher	#1–66	Ongoing series	Garth Ennis	Steve Dillon	April 1995 – October 2000	Won the Eisner Award for Best Continuing Series in 1999.
Preacher Special: Cassidy: Blood & Whiskey	#1	One-shot	Garth Ennis	Steve Dillon	February 1998	
Preacher Special: One Man's War	#1	One-shot	Garth Ennis	Peter Snejbjerg	March 1998	
Preacher Special: Saint of Killers	#1–4	Limited series	Garth Ennis	Steve Pugh	August – November 1996	
Preacher Special: Tall in the Saddle	#1	One-shot	Garth Ennis	Steve Dillon, John McCrea	February 2000	
Preacher Special: The Good Old Boys	#1	One-shot	Garth Ennis	Carlos Ezquerra	August 1997	
Preacher Special: The Story of You-Know-Who	#1	One-shot	Garth Ennis	Richard Case	December 1996	
Pride & Joy	#1–4	Limited series	Garth Ennis	John Higgins	July – October 1997	
Proposition Player	#1–6	Limited series	Bill Willingham	Bill Willingham, Paul Guinan	December 1999 – May 2000	
Pulp Fantastic	#1–3	Limited series	Howard Chaykin, David Tischman	Rick Burchett	February – April 2000	Published under the V2K imprint.
Punk Rock Jesus	#1–6	Limited series	Sean Murphy		September 2012 − February 2013	

=== R ===
Title	Issues	Type	Writer(s)	Artist(s)	Cover dates	Notes
Red Thorn	#1–13	Ongoing series	David Baillie	Meghan Hetrick	January 2016 – February 2017	
Rogan Gosh	#1	One-shot	Brendan McCarthy, Peter Milligan	Brendan McCarthy	May 1994	
The Royals: Masters of War	#1–6	Limited series	Rob Williams	Simon Coleby	April – September 2014	

=== S ===
Title	Issues	Type	Writer(s)	Artist(s)	Cover dates	Notes
S.C.I. Spy	#1–6	Limited series	Paul Gulacy, Doug Moench	Paul Gulacy, Jimmy Palmiotti	April – September 2002	
The Sandman	#47–75	Ongoing series	Neil Gaiman	Various	March 1993 – March 1996	Previous issues published by DC Comics.
Sandman Midnight Theatre	#1	One-shot	Neil Gaiman, Matt Wagner	Teddy Kristiansen	September 1995	
Sandman Mystery Theatre	#1–70	Ongoing series	Matt Wagner, Steven T. Seagle	Guy Davis	April 1993 – February 1999	
Sandman Mystery Theatre	Annual #1	Ongoing series	Matt Wagner, Steven T. Seagle	Various	October 1994	
Sandman Mystery Theatre: Sleep of Reason	#1–5	Limited series	John Ney Rieber	Eric Nguyen	February – June 2007	
The Sandman Presents: Bast	#1–3	Limited series	Caitlín R. Kiernan	Joe Bennett	March – May 2003	
The Sandman Presents: Everything You Always Wanted to Know About Dreams... But Were Afraid to Ask	#1	One-shot	Bill Willingham	Various	July 2001	
The Sandman Presents: Love Street	#1–3	Limited series	Peter Hogan	Michael Zulli, Vince Locke	July – September 1999	
The Sandman Presents: Lucifer: The Morningstar Option	#1–3	Limited series	Mike Carey	Scott Hampton	March – May 1999	
The Sandman Presents: Merv Pumpkinhead, Agent of Dream	#1	One-shot	Bill Willingham	John Stokes, Mark Buckingham	December 2000	
The Sandman Presents: Petrefax	#1–4	Limited series	Mike Carey	Steve Leialoha	March – June 2000	
The Sandman Presents: The Corinthian	#1–3	Limited series	Darko Macan	Danijel Žeželj	December 2001 – February 2002	
The Sandman Presents: The Dead Boy Detectives	#1–4	Limited series	Ed Brubaker	Bryan Talbot, Steve Leialoha	August – November 2001	
The Sandman Presents: The Thessaliad	#1–4	Limited series	Bill Willingham	Shawn McManus	March – June 2002	
The Sandman Presents: Thessaly: Witch for Hire	#1–4	Limited series	Bill Willingham	Shawn McManus	April – July 2004	
The Sandman Universe	#1	One-shot	Various	Various	October 2018	Introductory one-shot to The Sandman Universe imprint.
The Sandman: A Gallery of Dreams	#1	One-shot	Neil Gaiman	Various	October 1994	
The Sandman: Endless Nights Special	#1	One-shot	Neil Gaiman	Miguelanxo Prado	November 2003	
The Sandman: Overture	#1–6	Limited series	Neil Gaiman	J. H. Williams III	December 2013 − November 2015	
The Sandman: Overture	#1–6 Special Edition	Limited series	Neil Gaiman	J. H. Williams III	January 2014 – December 2015	
The Sandman: The Dream Hunters	Novella		Neil Gaiman	Yoshitaka Amano	1999	
The Sandman: The Dream Hunters	#1–4	Limited series	Neil Gaiman	P. Craig Russell	January – April 2009	Comic adaptation
Saucer Country	#1–14	Ongoing series	Paul Cornell	Ryan Kelly	May 2012 – June 2013	
Savage Things	#1–8	Limited series	Justin Jordan	Ibrahim Moustafa	May – December 2017	
Scalped	#1–60	Ongoing series	Jason Aaron	R. M. Guéra	March 2007 – October 2012	
Scarab	#1–8	Limited series	John Smith	Scot Eaton, Mike Barreiro	November 1993 – June 1994	
Scene of the Crime	#1–4	Limited series	Ed Brubaker	Michael Lark	May – August 1999	
Seaguy	#1–3	Limited series	Grant Morrison	Cameron Stewart	July – September 2004	
Seaguy: Slaves of Mickey Eye	#1–3	Limited series	Grant Morrison	Cameron Stewart	June − August 2009	
Sebastian O	#1–3	Limited series	Grant Morrison	Steve Yeowell	May – July 1993	
Seekers into the Mystery	#1–15	Ongoing series	J. M. DeMatteis	Glenn Barr, Michael Zulli, Jill Thompson, Jon J Muth	January 1996 – April 1997	
Seven Miles a Second	#1	One-shot	David Wojnarowicz	James Romberger	May 1996	Published under the Vertigo Vérité imprint.
Shade, the Changing Man	#33–70	Ongoing series	Peter Milligan	Various	March 1993 – April 1996	Second series. First 32 issues published under DC Comics.
Shadows Fall	#1–6	Limited series	John Ney Rieber	John Van Fleet	November 1994 – April 1995	
The Sheriff of Babylon	#1–12	Limited series	Tom King	Mitch Gerads	February 2016 − January 2017	
Skin Graft: The Adventures of a Tattooed Man	#1–4	Limited series	Jerry Prosser	Warren Pleece	July – October 1993	
Slash & Burn	#1–6	Ongoing series	Si Spencer	Max Dunbar	January – June 2016	
Sleepy Hollow	#1	One-shot	Steven T. Seagle	Kelley Jones	January 2000	
Spaceman	#1–9	Limited series	Brian Azzarello	Eduardo Risso	December 2011 – October 2012	
Strange Adventures	#1–4	Limited series	Various	Various	November 1999 – February 2000	Second series. See also: List of DC Comics publications
Strange Adventures	#1	One-shot	Various	Various	July 2011	Fourth series
Strange Sports Stories	#1–4	Limited series	Various	Various	May – August 2015	Second series. See also: List of DC Comics publications
Suiciders	#1–6	Limited series	Lee Bermejo	Matt Hollingsworth	April – November 2015	
Suiciders: Kings of HelL.A.	#1–6	Limited series	Lee Bermejo	Alessandro Vitti	May – December 2016	
Survivors' Club	#1–9	Ongoing series	David Halvorson, Lauren Beukes	Ryan Kelly	December 2015 – August 2016	
Swamp Thing	#129–171	Ongoing series	Nancy A. Collins, Grant Morrison, Mark Millar	Various	March 1993 – October 1996	Second series. Previous issues published under DC Comics.
Swamp Thing	Annual #7	Ongoing series	Nancy A. Collins	Various	December 1993	Part of The Children's Crusade event.
Swamp Thing	#1–20	Ongoing series	Brian K. Vaughan	Roger Petersen, Giuseppe Camuncoli	May 2000 – December 2001	Third series
Swamp Thing	#1–29	Ongoing series	Andy Diggle, Will Pfeifer, Joshua Dysart	Various	May 2004 – September 2006	Fourth series
Swamp Thing: Roots	#1	One-shot	Jon J Muth		April 1998	
Sweet Tooth	#1–40	Ongoing series	Jeff Lemire		November 2009 – February 2013	
The System	#1–3	Limited series	Peter Kuper		May – July 1996	Published under the Vertigo Vérité imprint.

=== T ===
Title	Issues	Type	Writer(s)	Artist(s)	Cover dates	Notes
Tainted	#1	One-shot	Jamie Delano	Al Davison	February 1995	Published under the Vertigo Voices imprint.
Tank Girl: Apocalypse!	#1–4	Limited series	Alan Grant	Andie Pritchett, Philip Bond	November 1995 – February 1996	
Tank Girl: The Movie Adaptation	#1	One-shot	Peter Milligan	Andie Pritchett	May 1995	Adaptation of the 1995 film Tank Girl.
Tank Girl: The Odyssey	#1–4	Limited series	Peter Milligan	Jamie Hewlett	June – October 1995	
Tattered Banners	#1–4	Limited series	Alan Grant, Keith Giffen	Mike McMahon	November 1998 – February 1999	
Terminal City	#1–9	Limited series	Dean Motter	Michael Lark	July 1996 – March 1997	
Terminal City: Aerial Graffiti	#1–5	Limited series	Dean Motter	Michael Lark	November 1997 – March 1998	
Testament	#1–22	Ongoing series	Douglas Rushkoff	Various	February 2006 – March 2008	
Time Warp	#1	One-shot	Various	Various	May 2013	
Tom Strong and the Planet of Peril	#1–6	Limited series	Peter Hogan	Chris Sprouse, Karl Story	September 2013 − February 2014	
Totems	#1	One-shot	Tom Peyer	Duncan Fegredo, Richard Case, Dean Ormston	February 2000	Published under the V2K imprint.
Toxic Gumbo	#1	One-shot	Lydia Lunch	Ted McKeever	May 1998	
Transmetropolitan	#13–60	Ongoing series	Warren Ellis	Darick Robertson, Rodney Ramos	September 1998 – November 2002	First 12 issues published by Helix.
Transmetropolitan: Filth of the City	#1	One-shot	Warren Ellis	Various	July 2001	
Transmetropolitan: I Hate It Here	#1	One-shot	Warren Ellis	Various	June 2000	
The Trenchcoat Brigade	#1–4	Limited series	John Ney Rieber	John Ridgway	March – June 1999	
Trigger	#1–8	Limited series	Jason Hall	John Watkiss	February – September 2005	
Trillium	#1–8	Limited series	Jeff Lemire		October 2013 − June 2014	
The Twilight Children	#1–4	Limited series	Gilbert Hernandez	Darwyn Cooke, Dave Stewart	December 2015 – March 2016	

=== U ===
Title	Issues	Type	Writer(s)	Artist(s)	Cover dates	Notes
The Un-Men	#1–13	Ongoing series	John Whalen	Mike Hawthorne	October 2007 – October 2008	
Uncle Sam	#1–2	Limited series	Steve Darnall	Alex Ross	January – February 1998	
The Unexpected	#1	One-shot	Various	Various	December 2011	Second series. See also: List of DC Comics publications
Unfollow	#1–18	Ongoing series	Rob Williams	Mike Dowling	January 2016 – June 2017	
Unknown Soldier	#1–4	Limited series	Garth Ennis	Kilian Plunkett	April – July 1997	Third series
Unknown Soldier	#1–25	Ongoing series	Joshua Dysart	Alberto Ponticelli	December 2008 – December 2010	Fourth series. See also: List of DC Comics publications
The Unseen Hand	#1–4	Limited series	Terry LaBan	Ilya, Ande Parks	September – December 1996	Published under the Vertigo Vérité imprint.
The Unwritten	#1–54	Ongoing series	Mike Carey	Peter Gross	July 2009 – December 2013	
The Unwritten	#31.5–35.5	Ongoing series	Mike Carey	Peter Gross	July 2009 – December 2013	
The Unwritten: Apocalypse	#1–12	Ongoing series	Mike Carey	Peter Gross	March 2014 – March 2015	
User	#1–3	Limited series	Devin Grayson	John Bolton, Sean Phillips	March – May 2001	

=== V ===
Title	Issues	Type	Writer(s)	Artist(s)	Cover dates	Notes
Vamps	#1–6	Limited series	Elaine Lee	Will Simpson	August 1994 – January 1995	
Vamps: Hollywood & Vein	#1–6	Limited series	Elaine Lee	Will Simpson	February – July 1996	
Vamps: Pumpkin Time	#1–3	Limited series	Elaine Lee	Will Simpson	December 1998 – February 1999	
Vertical	#1	One-shot	Steven T. Seagle	Mike Allred, Philip Bond, Laura Allred	February 2004	
Vertigo 2015 Preview	#1	One-shot	Various	Various	November 2015	
Vertigo Double Shot	#1	One-shot	Various	Various	October 2008	Flipbook reprinting House of Mystery #1 and Young Liars #1.
Vertigo Essentials: 100 Bullets	#1	One-shot	Brian Azzarello	Eduardo Risso	February 2014	Reprints 100 Bullets #1.
Vertigo Essentials: American Vampire	#1	One-shot	Scott Snyder	Rafael Albuquerque, Dave McCaig	February 2014	Reprints American Vampire #1.
Vertigo Essentials: Fables	#1	One-shot	Bill Willingham	Lan Medina, Steve Leialoha	January 2014	Reprints Fables #1.
Vertigo Essentials: The American Way	#1	One-shot	John Ridley	Georges Jeanty, Karl Story	September 2017	Reprints The American Way #1.
Vertigo Essentials: The Sandman	#1	One-shot	Neil Gaiman	Sam Kieth, Mike Dringenberg	December 2013	Reprints The Sandman #1.
Vertigo Essentials: V for Vendetta	#1	One-shot	Alan Moore	David Lloyd	December 2013	Reprints V for Vendetta #1.
Vertigo Essentials: Y: The Last Man	#1	One-shot	Brian K. Vaughan	Pia Guerra, José Marzan Jr.	January 2014	Reprints Y: The Last Man #1.
Vertigo First Blood	#1	One-shot	Various	Various	February 2012	
The Vertigo Gallery: Dreams and Nightmares	#1	One-shot		Various	October 1995	Illustrations one-shot
Vertigo Jam	#1	One-shot	Various	Various	August 1993	
Vertigo Pop! London	#1–4	Limited series	Peter Milligan	Philip Bond	January – April 2003	Issue #4 published under the Vertigo X imprint.
Vertigo Pop! Tokyo	#1–4	Limited series	Jonathan Vankin	Seth Fisher	September – December 2002	
Vertigo Pop!: Bangkok	#1–4	Limited series	Jonathan Vankin	Giuseppe Camuncoli, Shawn Martinbrough	July – October 2003	Published under the Vertigo X imprint.
Vertigo Preview	#1	One-shot	Various	Various	February 1993	Previews one-shot
Vertigo Quarterly	#1–4	Limited series	Various	Various	June 2014 – March 2015	CMYK: Cyan, Magenta, Yellow, Black
Vertigo Quarterly	#1–4	Limited series	Various	Various	June 2015 – March 2016	SFX: Pop!, Slam!, Krak!, Bam!
Vertigo Rave	#1	One-shot	Various	Various	Fall 1994	Previews one-shot
Vertigo Resurrected	#1	One-shot	Various	Various	December 2010	
Vertigo Resurrected: Finals	#1	One-shot	Will Pfeifer	Jill Thompson	May 2011	Reprints Finals #1–4.
Vertigo Resurrected: Hellblazer	#1	One-shot	Various	Various	February 2011	Reprints Hellblazer #57–58, 245–246.
Vertigo Resurrected: Hellblazer: Bad Blood	#1	One-shot	Jamie Delano	Various	June 2011	Reprints Hellblazer Special: Bad Blood #1–4.
Vertigo Resurrected: Jonny Double	#1	One-shot	Brian Azzarello	Eduardo Risso	October 2011	Reprints Jonny Double #1–4.
Vertigo Resurrected: My Faith in Frankie	#1	One-shot	Mike Carey	Sonny Liew, Marc Hempel	January 2012	Reprints My Faith in Frankie #1–4.
Vertigo Resurrected: Sgt. Rock: Between Hell & a Hard Place	#1–2	Limited series	Brian Azzarello	Joe Kubert	January – February 2012	Reprints the graphic novel.
Vertigo Resurrected: The Eaters	#1	One-shot	Various	Various	December 2011	Reprints The Eaters #1 and other stories.
Vertigo Resurrected: The Extremist	#1	One-shot	Peter Milligan	Ted McKeever	January 2011	Reprints The Extremist #1.
Vertigo Resurrected: The Sandman Presents: Petrefax	#1	One-shot	Mike Carey	Steve Leialoha	August 2011	Reprints The Sandman Presents: Petrefax #1.
Vertigo Resurrected: Winter's Edge	#1	One-shot	Various	Various	February 2011	Reprints Vertigo: Winter's Edge #1–3.
Vertigo Secret Files & Origins: Swamp Thing	#1	One-shot	Various	Various	November 2000	
Vertigo Secret Files: Hellblazer	#1	One-shot	Various	Various	August 2000	
Vertigo Visions: Doctor 13	#1	One-shot	Matt Howarth	Michael Avon Oeming	September 1998	
Vertigo Visions: Doctor Occult	#1	One-shot	Dave Louapre	Dan Sweetman	July 1994	
Vertigo Visions: Prez	#1	One-shot	Ed Brubaker	Eric Shanower	September 1995	
Vertigo Visions: Tomahawk	#1	One-shot	Rachel Pollack	Thomas Yeates	July 1998	
Vertigo Visions: The Geek	#1	One-shot	Rachel Pollack	Mike Allred	June 1993	
Vertigo Visions: The Phantom Stranger	#1	One-shot	Alisa Kwitney	Guy Davis	October 1993	
Vertigo X Anniversary Preview	#1	One-shot	Various	Various	April 2003	Previews one-shot
Vertigo: Winter's Edge	#1–3	One-shots	Various	Various	January 1998 – January 2000	Anthology series
Vimanarama	#1–3	Limited series	Grant Morrison	Philip Bond	April – June 2005	
The Vinyl Underground	#1–12	Ongoing series	Si Spencer	Simon Gane, Cameron Stewart, Ryan Kelly	December 2007 – November 2008	

=== W ===
Title	Issues	Type	Writer(s)	Artist(s)	Cover dates	Notes
The Wake	#1–10	Limited series	Scott Snyder	Sean Murphy	July 2013 − August 2014	Won the Eisner Award for Best Limited Series in 2014.
The Wake	#1 Director's Cut	One-shot	Scott Snyder	Sean Murphy	October 2013	Reprints the first issue and includes extras.
A Walking Shadow	#1–TBD	TBD	Simon Spurrier	Aaron Campbell	TBD 2026 – present	
War Story: Archangel	#1	One-shot	Garth Ennis	Gary Erskine	April 2003	Part of the War Stories series.
War Story: Condors	#1	One-shot	Garth Ennis	Carlos Ezquerra	March 2003	Part of the War Stories series.
War Story: D-Day Dodgers	#1	One-shot	Garth Ennis	John Higgins	December 2001	Part of the War Stories series.
War Story: J for Jenny	#1	One-shot	Garth Ennis	David Lloyd	February 2003	Part of the War Stories series.
War Story: Johann's Tiger	#1	One-shot	Garth Ennis	Chris Weston, Gary Erskine	November 2001	Part of the War Stories series.
War Story: Nightingale	#1	One-shot	Garth Ennis	David Lloyd	February 2002	Part of the War Stories series.
War Story: Screaming Eagles	#1	One-shot	Garth Ennis	Dave Gibbons	January 2002	Part of the War Stories series.
War Story: The Reivers	#1	One-shot	Garth Ennis	Cam Kennedy	January 2003	Part of the War Stories series.
We3	#1–3	Limited series	Grant Morrison	Frank Quitely	October 2004 – March 2005	
Weird War Tales	#1–4	Limited series	Various	Various	June – September 1997	Second series. Anthology series. See also: List of DC Comics publications
Weird War Tales Special	#1	One-shot	Various	Various	April 2000	
Weird Western Tales	#1–4	Limited series	Various	Various	April – July 2001	Second series. Anthology series. See also: List of DC Comics publications
Welcome Back to the House of Mystery	#1	One-shot	Various	Various	July 1998	
Witchcraft	#1–3	Limited series	James Robinson	Teddy Kristiansen	June – August 1994	
Witchcraft: La Terreur	#1–3	Limited series	James Robinson	Michael Zulli, Vince Locke	April – June 1998	
The Witching	#1–10	Ongoing series	Jonathan Vankin	Leigh Gallagher, Ron Randall, Dan Green	August 2004 – May 2005	
The Witching Hour	#1–3	Limited series	Jeph Loeb	Chris Bachalo, Art Thibert	June – August 1999	Second series. See also: List of DC Comics publications
The Witching Hour	#1	One-shot	Various	Various	December 2013	Third series. Anthology one-shot.
Wolf Moon	#1–6	Limited series	Cullen Bunn	Jeremy Haun	February – July 2015	

=== Y ===
Title	Issues	Type	Writer(s)	Artist(s)	Cover dates	Notes
Y: The Last Man	#1–60	Ongoing series	Brian K. Vaughan	Pia Guerra	September 2002 – March 2008	Issues #8–17 published under the Vertigo X imprint. Won the Eisner Award for Best Continuing Series in 2008.
Young Liars	#1–18	Ongoing series	David Lapham		May 2008 – October 2009	

=== Z ===
Title	Issues	Type	Writer(s)	Artist(s)	Cover dates	Notes
Zatanna: Everyday Magic	#1	One-shot	Paul Dini	Rick Mays	May 2003	Prestige format one-shot

== Graphic novels ==
Title	Writer(s)	Artist(s)	Publication date	Format	ISBN	Notes
99 Days	Matteo Casali	Kristian Donaldson	August 2011	Hardcover	978-1401230890	Published under the Vertigo Crime imprint.
A Flight of Angels	Rebecca Guay, various co-writers	Rebecca Guay	November 2011	Hardcover	978-1401232009	
A Flight of Angels	Rebecca Guay, various co-writers	Rebecca Guay	November 2012	Paperback	978-1401221478	
A History of Violence	John Wagner	Vince Locke	August 2011	Paperback	978-1401231897	Originally published by Paradox Press in 1997.
A Sickness in the Family	Denise Mina	Antonio Fuso	October 2010	Hardcover	978-1401210816	Published under the Vertigo Crime imprint.
A.D.D.: Adolescent Demo Division	Douglas Rushkoff	Goran Sudžuka	January 2012	Hardcover	978-1401223557	
A.D.D.: Adolescent Demo Division	Douglas Rushkoff	Goran Sudžuka	2013	Paperback	978-8866912736	
Aaron and Ahmed	Jay Cantor	James Romberger	April 2011	Hardcover	978-1401211868	
The Alcoholic	Jonathan Ames	Dean Haspiel	October 2008	Hardcover	978-1401210564	
The Alcoholic	Jonathan Ames	Dean Haspiel	September 2009	Paperback	978-1401210571	
Area 10	Christos N. Gage	Chris Samnee	April 2010	Hardcover	978-1401210670	Published under the Vertigo Crime imprint.
Area 10	Christos N. Gage	Chris Samnee	April 2011	Paperback	978-1401226305	Published under the Vertigo Crime imprint.
Barnum!: In Secret Service to the USA	Howard Chaykin, David Tischman	Niko Henrichon	May 2003	Hardcover	978-1401200725	
Barnum!: In Secret Service to the USA	Howard Chaykin, David Tischman	Niko Henrichon	December 2004	Paperback	978-1401200732	
Bigg Time: A Farcical Fable of Fleeting Time	Ty Templeton	Ty Templeton	August 2002	Paperback	978-1563899058	
The Bronx Kill	Peter Milligan	James Romberger	March 2010	Hardcover	978-1401211554	Published under the Vertigo Crime imprint.
The Bronx Kill	Peter Milligan	James Romberger	March 2011	Paperback	978-1401226312	Published under the Vertigo Crime imprint.
Cairo	G. Willow Wilson	M. K. Perker	November 2007	Hardcover	978-1401211400	
Cairo	G. Willow Wilson	M. K. Perker	October 2008	Paperback	978-1401217341	
Can't Get No	Rick Veitch	Rick Veitch	June 2006	Paperback	978-1401210595	
The Chill	Jason Starr	Mick Bertilorenzi	January 2010	Hardcover	978-1401212865	Published under the Vertigo Crime imprint.
The Chill	Jason Starr	Mick Bertilorenzi	January 2011	Paperback	978-1401225469	Published under the Vertigo Crime imprint.
The Cowboy Wally Show	Kyle Baker	Kyle Baker	June 2003	Paperback	978-1401200503	16th Anniversary Edition. Originally published by Doubleday in 1998 and Marlowe & Company in 1996.
Cowboys	Gary Phillips	Brian Hurtt	July 2011	Hardcover	978-1401215347	Published under the Vertigo Crime imprint.
Cuba: My Revolution	Inverna Lockpez	Dean Haspiel	September 2010	Hardcover	978-1401222185	
Cuba: My Revolution	Inverna Lockpez	Dean Haspiel	September 2011	Paperback	978-1401222185	
Dark Entries	Ian Rankin	Werther Dell'Edera	August 2009	Hardcover	978-1401213862	Published under the Vertigo Crime imprint.
Dark Entries	Ian Rankin	Werther Dell'Edera	August 2010	Paperback	978-1401224295	Published under the Vertigo Crime imprint.
Dark Night: A True Batman Story	Paul Dini	Eduardo Risso	June 2016	Hardcover	978-1401241438	
Dark Night: A True Batman Story	Paul Dini	Eduardo Risso	June 2017	Paperback	978-1401271367	
Dark Rain: A New Orleans Story	Mat Johnson	Simon Gane	August 2010	Hardcover	978-1401221607	
The Dead Boy Detectives	Jill Thompson	Jill Thompson	July 2005	Paperback	978-1401203139	
Delirium's Party: A Little Endless Storybook	Jill Thompson	Jill Thompson	2011	Hardcover	978-1401224776	
Dog Moon	Robert Hunter	Timothy Truman	February 1996	Paperback	978-1563892370	
The Executor	Jon Evans	Andrea Mutti	May 2010	Hardcover	978-1401213855	Published under the Vertigo Crime imprint.
The Executor	Jon Evans	Andrea Mutti	May 2011	Paperback	978-1401228217	Published under the Vertigo Crime imprint.
Fables: 1001 Nights of Snowfall	Bill Willingham	Various	October 2006	Hardcover	978-1401203672	
Fables: 1001 Nights of Snowfall	Bill Willingham	Various	March 2008	Paperback	978-1401203696	
Fables: Werewolves of the Heartland	Bill Willingham	Various	November 2012	Hardcover	978-1401224790	
Fables: Werewolves of the Heartland	Bill Willingham	Various	October 2013	Paperback	978-1401224806	
Fairest In All the Land	Bill Willingham	Various	November 2013	Hardcover	978-1401239008	
Fairest In All the Land	Bill Willingham	Various	November 2014	Paperback	978-1401245573	
Filthy Rich	Brian Azzarello	Victor Santos	August 2009	Hardcover	978-1401211844	Published under the Vertigo Crime imprint.
Filthy Rich	Brian Azzarello	Victor Santos	August 2010	Paperback	978-1401211851	Published under the Vertigo Crime imprint.
Fogtown	Andersen Gabrych	Brad Rader	August 2010	Hardcover	978-1401213848	Published under the Vertigo Crime imprint.
Fogtown	Andersen Gabrych	Brad Rader	August 2011	Paperback	978-1401229504	Published under the Vertigo Crime imprint.
The Fountain	Darren Aronofsky	Kent Williams	November 2005	Hardcover	978-1401200596	Adaptation of the original script of the 2006 film The Fountain.
The Fountain	Darren Aronofsky	Kent Williams	October 2006	Paperback	978-1401200589	Adaptation of the original script of the 2006 film The Fountain.
Get Jiro!	Joel Rose, Anthony Bourdain	Langdon Foss	June 2012	Hardcover	978-1401228279	
Get Jiro!	Joel Rose, Anthony Bourdain	Langdon Foss	May 2013	Paperback	978-1401228286	
Get Jiro!: Blood and Sushi	Joel Rose, Anthony Bourdain	Alé Garza	October 2015	Hardcover	978-1401252267	
Get Jiro!: Blood and Sushi	Joel Rose, Anthony Bourdain	Alé Garza	October 2016	Paperback	978-1401265007	
The Girl who Kicked the Hornets' Nest	Denise Mina	Andrea Mutti, Antonio Fuso	July 2015	Hardcover	978-1401237592	Adaptation of the 2007 novel The Girl who Kicked the Hornets' Nest.
The Girl who Kicked the Hornets' Nest	Denise Mina	Andrea Mutti, Antonio Fuso	October 2016	Paperback	978-1401264772	Adaptation of the 2007 novel The Girl who Kicked the Hornets' Nest.
The Girl who Played with Fire	Denise Mina	Andrea Mutti, Antonio Fuso, Leonardo Manco	May 2014	Hardcover	978-1401237578	Adaptation of the 2006 novel The Girl who Played with Fire.
The Girl who Played with Fire	Denise Mina	Andrea Mutti, Antonio Fuso, Leonardo Manco	May 2015	Paperback	978-1401255503	Adaptation of the 2006 novel The Girl who Played with Fire.
The Girl with the Dragon Tattoo Book 1	Denise Mina	Leonardo Manco, Andrea Mutti	November 2012	Hardcover	978-1401235574	Adaptation of the 2005 novel The Girl with the Dragon Tattoo.
The Girl with the Dragon Tattoo Book 2	Denise Mina	Leonardo Manco, Andrea Mutti	May 2013	Hardcover	978-1401235581	Adaptation of the 2005 novel The Girl with the Dragon Tattoo.
God Save the Queen	Mike Carey	John Bolton	April 2007	Hardcover	978-1401203030	
God Save the Queen	Mike Carey	John Bolton	April 2008	Paperback	978-1401203047	
Gone to Amerikay	Derek McCulloch	Colleen Doran, José Villarrubia	March 2012	Hardcover	978-1401223519	
The Green Woman	Peter Straub, Michael Easton	John Bolton	October 2010	Hardcover	978-1401211004	
The Green Woman	Peter Straub, Michael Easton	John Bolton	November 2011	Paperback	978-1401211011	
The Heart of the Beast	Dean Motter, Judith Dupré	Sean Phillips	May 1994	Hardcover	978-1563891458	
The Heart of the Beast	Dean Motter, Judith Dupré	Sean Phillips		Paperback	978-1563891687	
Hellblazer: All His Engines	Mike Carey	Leonardo Manco	January 2005	Hardcover	978-1401203160	
Hellblazer: All His Engines	Mike Carey	Leonardo Manco	July 2006	Paperback	978-1401203177	
Hellblazer: Pandemonium	Jamie Delano	Jock	February 2010	Hardcover	978-1401220358	
Hellblazer: Pandemonium	Jamie Delano	Jock	February 2011	Paperback	978-1401220396	
The House on the Borderland	William Hope Hodgson, Richard Corben, Simon Revelstone	Richard Corben, Lee Loughridge	November 2000	Hardcover	978-1563895456	Adaptation of the 1908 novel The House on the Borderland. Included an introduction by Alan Moore.
The House on the Borderland	William Hope Hodgson, Richard Corben, Simon Revelstone	Richard Corben, Lee Loughridge	May 2003	Paperback	978-1563898600	Adaptation of the 1908 novel The House on the Borderland. Included an introduction by Alan Moore.
How to Understand Israel in 60 days or Less	Sarah Glidden	Sarah Glidden	November 2010	Hardcover	978-1401222338	
How to Understand Israel in 60 days or Less	Sarah Glidden	Sarah Glidden	August 2011	Paperback	978-1401222345	
Human Target: Final Cut	Peter Milligan	Javier Pulido, Dave Stewart	May 2002	Hardcover	978-1563898891	
Human Target: Final Cut	Peter Milligan	Javier Pulido, Dave Stewart	August 2003	Paperback	978-1563899041	
I, Paparazzi	Pat McGreal	Stephen John Phillips, Steven Parke	October 2001	Hardcover	978-1563897528	Photography instead of traditional hand-drawn illustration
I, Paparazzi	Pat McGreal	Stephen John Phillips, Steven Parke	November 2002	Paperback	978-1563898631	Photography instead of traditional hand-drawn illustration
In the Shadow of Edgar Allan Poe	Jonathon Scott Fuqua, Steven Parke	Steven Parke, Stephen John Phillips	September 2002	Hardcover	978-1563899287	
In the Shadow of Edgar Allan Poe	Jonathon Scott Fuqua, Steven Parke	Steven Parke, Stephen John Phillips	July 2003	Paperback	978-1401200176	
Incognegro	Mat Johnson	Warren Pleece	February 2008	Hardcover	978-1401210977	
Incognegro	Mat Johnson	Warren Pleece	May 2009	Paperback	978-1401210984	
It's a Bird...	Steven T. Seagle	Teddy Kristiansen	April 2004	Hardcover	978-1401201098	
It's a Bird...	Steven T. Seagle	Teddy Kristiansen	February 2005	Paperback	978-1401203115	
King David	Kyle Baker	Kyle Baker	May 2002	Paperback	978-1563898662	
The Little Endless Storybook	Jill Thompson	Jill Thompson	August 2001	Hardcover	978-1401204280	
Lovecraft	Hans Rodionoff, Keith Giffen	Enrique Breccia	February 2004	Hardcover	978-1401201104	
Lovecraft	Hans Rodionoff, Keith Giffen	Enrique Breccia	November 2004	Paperback	978-1401201432	
Luna Park	Kevin Baker	Danijel Žeželj	November 2009	Hardcover	978-1401215842	
Luna Park	Kevin Baker	Danijel Žeželj	November 2010	Paperback	978-1401224264	
Marzi: A Memoir	Marzena Sowa	Sylvain Savoia	October 2011	Paperback	978-1401229597	
Menz Insana	Christopher Fowler	John Bolton	July 1997	Paperback	978-1563893001	
Mercy	J. M. DeMatteis	Paul Johnson	March 1993	Paperback	978-1563890918	
The Mystery Play	Grant Morrison	Jon J. Muth	March 1994	Hardcover	978-1563891083	
The Mystery Play	Grant Morrison	Jon J. Muth	June 1995	Paperback	978-1563891892	
Neil Young's Greendale	Joshua Dysart	Cliff Chiang, Dave Stewart	June 2010	Hardcover	978-1401226985	Adaptation of the music album of the same name.
Neil Young's Greendale	Joshua Dysart	Cliff Chiang, Dave Stewart	September 2013	Paperback	978-1401228224	Adaptation of the music album of the same name.
The Nobody	Jeff Lemire	Jeff Lemire	July 2009	Hardcover	978-1401220808	
The Nobody	Jeff Lemire	Jeff Lemire	May 2010	Paperback	978-1401220815	
Noche Roja	Simon Oliver	Jason Latour	February 2011	Hardcover	978-1401215354	Published under the Vertigo Crime imprint.
Orbiter	Warren Ellis	Colleen Doran	April 2003	Hardcover	978-1401200565	
Orbiter	Warren Ellis	Colleen Doran	May 2004	Paperback	978-1401202682	
The Originals	Dave Gibbons	Dave Gibbons	October 2004	Hardcover	978-1401203559	
The Originals	Dave Gibbons	Dave Gibbons	November 2005	Paperback	978-1401203566	
Other Lives	Peter Bagge	Peter Bagge	April 2010	Hardcover	978-1401219024	
Peter & Max: A Fables Novel	Bill Willingham	Steve Leialoha	October 2009	Hardcover	978-1401215736	Fables spin-off novel.
Peter & Max: A Fables Novel	Bill Willingham	Steve Leialoha	December 2012	Paperback	978-1401225377	Fables spin-off novel.
Pride of Baghdad	Brian K. Vaughan	Niko Henrichon	September 2006	Hardcover	978-1401203146	
Pride of Baghdad	Brian K. Vaughan	Niko Henrichon	January 2008	Paperback	978-1401203153	
Prince of Cats	Ron Wimberly	Ron Wimberly	September 2012	Paperback	978-1401220686	
The Quitter	Harvey Pekar	Dean Haspiel	October 2005	Hardcover	978-1401203993	
The Quitter	Harvey Pekar	Dean Haspiel	September 2006	Paperback	978-1401204006	
Rat Catcher	Andy Diggle	Victor Ibáñez	January 2011	Hardcover	978-1401211585	Published under the Vertigo Crime imprint.
Rat Catcher	Andy Diggle	Victor Ibáñez	February 2012	Paperback	978-1401230630	Published under the Vertigo Crime imprint.
Return to Perdition	Max Allan Collins	Terry Beatty	November 2011	Hardcover	978-1401223830	Published under the Vertigo Crime imprint.
Return to Perdition	Max Allan Collins	Terry Beatty	November 2012	Paperback	978-1401223847	Published under the Vertigo Crime imprint.
Revolver	Matt Kindt	Matt Kindt	July 2010	Hardcover	978-1401222413	
Revolver	Matt Kindt	Matt Kindt	July 2011	Paperback	978-1401222420	
Right State	Mat Johnson	Andrea Mutti	August 2012	Hardcover	978-1401229436	
Right State	Mat Johnson	Andrea Mutti	August 2013	Paperback	978-1401229443	
The Sandman Presents: The Furies	Mike Carey	John Bolton	November 2002	Hardcover	978-1563899355	
The Sandman Presents: The Furies	Mike Carey	John Bolton	November 2003	Paperback	978-1401200930	
The Sandman: Endless Nights	Neil Gaiman	Various	September 2003	Hardcover	978-1401200893	Won the Eisner Award for Best Anthology in 2004.
The Sandman: Endless Nights	Neil Gaiman	Various	August 2004	Paperback	978-1401201135	Won the Eisner Award for Best Anthology in 2004.
Sentences: The Life of MF Grimm	Percy Carey	Ronald Wimberly	September 2007	Hardcover	978-1401210465	
Sentences: The Life of MF Grimm	Percy Carey	Ronald Wimberly	October 2008	Paperback	978-1401210472	
Sgt. Rock: Between Hell & a Hard Place	Brian Azzarello	Joe Kubert	November 2003	Hardcover	978-1401200534	
Sgt. Rock: Between Hell & a Hard Place	Brian Azzarello	Joe Kubert	November 2004	Paperback	978-1401200541	
Shooters	Eric Trautmann, Brandon Jerwa	Steve Lieber	April 2012	Hardcover	978-1401222154	
Silverfish	David Lapham	David Lapham	July 2007	Hardcover	978-1401210489	
Silverfish	David Lapham	David Lapham	December 2008	Paperback	978-1401210496	
Six Days: The Incredible Story of D-Day's Lost Chapter	Robert Venditti, Kevin Maurer	Andrea Mutti	May 2019	Hardcover	978-1401290719	
Sloth	Gilbert Hernandez	Gilbert Hernandez	July 2006	Hardcover	978-1401203665	
Sloth	Gilbert Hernandez	Gilbert Hernandez	November 2008	Paperback	978-1401203689	
Stuck Rubber Baby	Howard Cruse	Howard Cruse	June 2010	Hardcover	978-1401227135	Originally published by Paradox Press.
Stuck Rubber Baby	Howard Cruse	Howard Cruse	June 2011	Paperback	978-1401227036	Originally published by Paradox Press.
The Tragical Comedy or Comical Tragedy of Mr. Punch	Neil Gaiman	Dave McKean	November 1994	Hardcover	978-1563891816	
The Tragical Comedy or Comical Tragedy of Mr. Punch	Neil Gaiman	Dave McKean	September 1995	Paperback	978-1563892462	
True Faith	Garth Ennis	Warren Pleece	August 1997	Paperback	978-1563893780	Originally published by Fleetway Publications in 1990.
Undercover Genie: The Irreverent Conjurings of a Illustrative Aladdin	Kyle Baker	Kyle Baker	August 2003	Paperback	978-1401201043	
The Unwritten: Tommy Taylor and the Ship That Sank Twice	Mike Carey	Peter Gross	September 2013	Hardcover	978-1401229764	
The Unwritten: Tommy Taylor and the Ship That Sank Twice	Mike Carey	Peter Gross	September 2014	Paperback	978-1401229771	
Veils	Pat McGreal	Stephen John Phillips, Rebecca Guay, José Villarrubia	April 1999	Hardcover	978-1563893551	
Veils	Pat McGreal	Stephen John Phillips, Rebecca Guay, José Villarrubia	October 1999	Paperback	978-1563895616	
Why I Hate Saturn	Kyle Baker	Kyle Baker	November 1998	Paperback	978-0930289720	Originally published by Piranha Press in 1990.
You Are Here	Kyle Baker	Kyle Baker	November 1998	Paperback	978-1563894428	Won the Harvey Award for Best Graphic Album of Original Work in 1999.

== See also ==
- List of Vertigo Comics reprint collections
- List of DC Comics publications
