= Glenn Fabry =

British comics artist

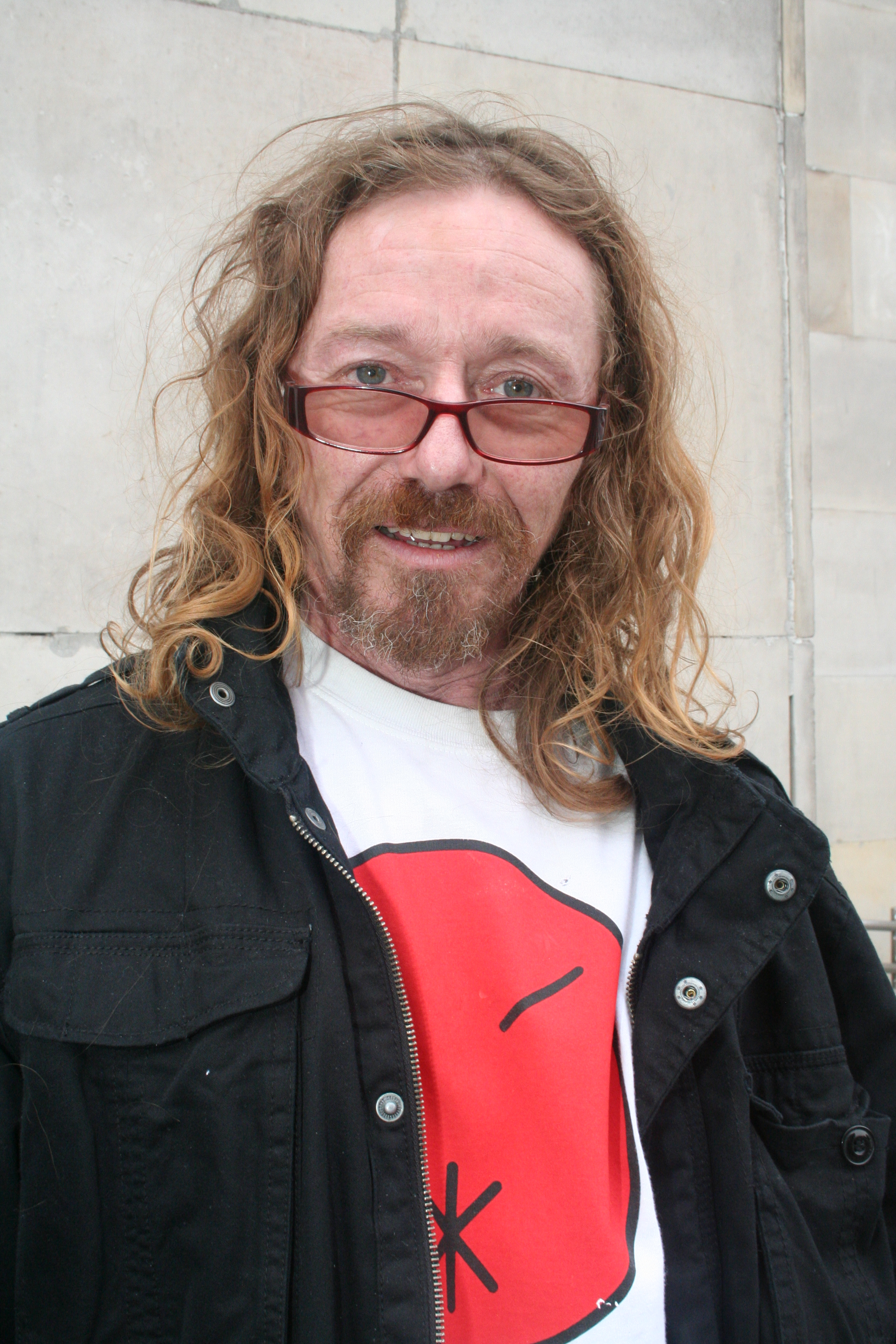
- Fabry in 2012
- Born: 24 March 1961 (age 65)
- Areas: Penciler, Inker
- Notable works: Sláine, Preacher
- Awards: "Best Cover Artist" Eisner Award, 1995

Glenn Fabry (/ˈfeɪbri/; born 24 March 1961) is a British comics artist known for his detailed, realistic work in both ink and painted colour.

== Career ==
Glenn Fabry's career began in 1985, drawing Slaine for 2000 AD, with writer Pat Mills. He also worked with Mills on the newspaper strip Scatha in 1987. Painted work followed in Crisis, Revolver and Deadline. In 1991 he took over painting the covers of Hellblazer, then written by Garth Ennis.

He has continued his association with Ennis, painting the covers for his Vertigo series Preacher, and drawing Ennis-written stories in The Authority and Thor. In 2003 he drew a story in Neil Gaiman's Sandman anthology Endless Nights, and in 2005 worked on the comics adaptation of Gaiman's TV series/novel Neverwhere with writer Mike Carey.

Recent projects include providing the art for the Vertigo title Greatest Hits, written by David Tischman.

== Personal life ==
In 2018, Fabry announced that he had been diagnosed with lung cancer. It was found to be a misdiagnosis in December 2018, and was confirmed to be tuberculosis, which he reported in January 2019 was in remission.

== Awards ==
- 1995: Won the "Best Cover Artist" Eisner Award, for Hellblazer

== Bibliography ==
=== Comics ===
- Sláine (with Pat Mills):
  - "Time Killer" (in 2000 AD #411–412, 419–421, 427–428, 431, 1985)
  - "Tomb of Terror" (in 2000 AD #447–448, 458–460, 1985–1986)
  - "The Devil's Banquet" (in 1986 2000 AD Sci-Fi Special)
  - "Slaine the King" (in 2000 AD #500–508 & 517–519, 1986–1987)
  - "The Killing Field" (with Angela Kincaid, in 2000 AD No. 582, 1988)
  - "Slaine the King" (in 2000 AD #589–591, 1988)
  - "Slaine the High King" (in 1992 2000 AD Yearbook, 1991)
  - "Demon Killer" (in 2000 AD #852–859, 1993)
- Tharg's Future Shocks: "Plastic Surgeon" (with Chris Smith, in 2000 AD No. 576, 1988)
- Judge Dredd:
  - "The Sage" (with John Wagner/Alan Grant, in 2000 AD No. 577, 1988)
  - "The Power of the Gods" (with Alan Grant, in 2000 AD No. 600, 1988)
  - "Talkback" (with Garth Ennis, in 2000 AD No. 740, 1991)
- Bricktop (art and script, with co-author Chris Smith, in A1 series 1 #1-6a, 1989–1992)
- "A Day in the Life" (with Igor Goldkind, in Crisis No. 39, 1990)
- "Loveboy loves Lovegirl" (with Brett Ewins, in Deadline, 1990)
- "Waltz" (with Ian Salmon, in Revolver No. 3, 1990)
- "Prisoner of Justice" (with Alan Mitchell, in Crisis No. 52, 1990)
- "The One I Love" (with Garth Ennis, in Revolver Romance Special, 1991)
- "Along for the Ride" (with Igor Goldkind, in A1 series 2 No. 1, 1992)
- Batman/Judge Dredd: Die Laughing #1 (pages 1–46, with John Wagner/Alan Grant, DC Comics/Fleetway, 1998)
- Global Frequency #2: "Big Wheel" (pencils, with Warren Ellis and inks by Liam Sharp, Wildstorm, 2001)
- Daredevil/Bullseye: The Target (with Kevin Smith, Marvel Comics, 2002)
- The Authority: Kev (with Garth Ennis, Wildstorm, tpb, 2005 ISBN 1-4012-0614-X) collects:
  - "Kev" (one-shot, 2002)
  - "More Kev" (4-issue mini-series, 2004)
- Destruction: On The Peninsula (with Neil Gaiman, in The Sandman: Endless Nights, 2003)
- Thor: Vikings (with Garth Ennis, Marvel Comics, 2003)
- Neverwhere (with Mike Carey, DC/Vertigo, 2005)
- Midnighter No. 6 (with Garth Ennis, Wildstorm, 2007)
- Greatest Hits (with David Tischman, 6-issue limited series, Vertigo, November 2008 – April 2009)

==== Covers ====
- Preacher #1–66 (plus 5 specials and a 4-issue miniseries)
- Outlaw Nation
- Transmetropolitan #50–54
- The Dead: Kingdom of Flies (covers, with Alan Grant and Simon Bisley, Berserker Comics, 2008–2009)
- Hellblazer #52–83, 129–133, 144–145, 239–242, Hellblazer Special #1, Hellblazer Presents: Chas – The Knowledge #1–5
- Jacked #1–6
- Vertigo Jam #1
- Marvel Knights: Double Shot #2

=== Other work ===
- Magic: The Gathering as of the Ravnica: City of Guilds expansion.
- SLA Industries Cover of Hogshead Publishing edition
- Lost For Words Cover of Mach One LP (released 1984)
- An Ancient Lie Cover of Mach One CD (released 2002)
- Six of One Cover of Mach One Cassette Album (released 1983)
- Half a Dozen of the Other Cover of Janysium Cassette Album (released 1983)
- Official Art for Brighton Wok: The Legend of Ganja Boxing Film (released 2008)
- Cover art for Kill Shakespeare: The Board Game
- Cover art for Sláine (video game) (released 1987)
- Cover art for Speedball 2: Brutal Deluxe (released 1990)
- Cover art for Captain America and The Avengers (SNES version) (released 1993)
- Cover art for The Incredible Hulk (video game) (released 1994)
- Cover art for Marvel Super Heroes: War of the Gems (released 1996)
- Cover art for Damage Incorporated (released 1997)
- Art of Arcanum: Of Steamworks and Magick Obscura (released 2001)
- Cover art for Desperados: Wanted Dead or Alive (North American version) (released 2001)
- Cover art for Dungeons & Dragons: Heroes (released 2003)

=== Books ===
- Muscles in Motion: Figure Book Drawing for the Comic Book Artist (144 pages, Watson-Guptill, ISBN 0-8230-3145-4)
