= Bite Club =

Bite Club may refer to:

- Bite Club (comics), a Vertigo comic book mini series created by Howard Chaykin and David Tischman
- Bite Club (TV series), an Australian crime thriller television series
