= Amazons Attack! =

DC Comics limited series

- Art by Pete Woods.

Publication information
- Publisher: DC Comics
- Schedule: Monthly
- Format: Limited series
- Genre: Superhero
- Publication date: March–August 2007
- No. of issues: 6
- Main character(s): Queen Hippolyta, Nemesis, Sarge Steel, Cassie Sandsmark, Supergirl, Circe

Creative team
- Written by: Will Pfeifer
- Artist: Pete Woods

Collected editions
- Hardcover: ISBN 1-4012-1543-2

Amazons Attack! is a six-issue comic book limited series that was published by DC Comics. Written by Will Pfeifer and pencilled by Pete Woods, the first issue was released on April 25, 2007. A series with the same name written by Josie Campbell as part of the Dawn of DC initiative ran for six issues between 2023 and 2024.

== Development ==
A proposed story titled Amazons Attack! was originally slated as one of the mini-series that led into the Infinite Crisis storyline, but was cancelled and never appeared. Though the projects share the same title, the planned Crisis tie-in was a completely different storyline that involved the U.S. military invading Themyscira.

== Plot ==
After leaving the DC Universe during the events of Infinite Crisis, the Amazons return to attack Washington, D.C., in retaliation for the American government's illegal detention of Wonder Woman.

The Amazons teleport to Washington, D.C., where Diana is being held captive and tortured by the Department of Metahuman Affairs. The DMA wants the schematic plans for an Amazonian Purple Ray, wishing to deploy the device for their own uses. Diana refuses their demand. Led by the newly resurrected Hippolyta and her adviser Circe, the Amazons are joined by mythical creatures such as chimeras, pegasus, hydras, and several cyclopes. The Amazon forces waste no time in murdering every male in sight, both adult and child, regardless of whether or not they are armed. Hippolyta is bent on destroying Man's World once and for all and emphasizes this point by slicing the head off of Lincoln's statue at the Lincoln Memorial. Two Amazons enter the White House and attempt to assassinate the President of the United States, but are stopped by Black Lightning.

The Amazons are unaware that Wonder Woman's capture was orchestrated by Circe, and that Diana was rescued by Nemesis shortly before their invasion. While the Justice League and the U.S. military assemble to combat the assault, Wonder Woman comes face-to-face with her reborn mother. After realizing that Hippolyta is not an impostor, Diana tries reasoning with her mother to stop the war. Instead Hippolyta grows angry with her daughter, telling Diana that her rightful place is by her side.

Diana leaves and finds Circe, who admits that her mobilization of the Amazon forces has been a ruse to force the destruction of the Amazon's homeland, Themyscira. Hippolyta overhears this conversation, and drives a battle spear through Circe's chest. Circe then disappears. Donna Troy also tries reasoning with Hippolyta to end the war: Hippolyta agrees to peace talks if Donna and her sister Diana both meet with her at the same time, but the Amazons launch attacks on California and Kansas.

The escalating attacks lead Amazon leaders Philipus and Artemis to question Hippolyta's motives. The severity of the situation causes the U.S. President to invoke the provisions of the McCarran Internal Security Act.

Consequently, Wonder Girl's mother is held with other women at an internment camp. Cassie and Supergirl confront the soldiers guarding the camp, and are themselves threatened with arrest due to their ties to the Amazons. The Teen Titans arrive to attempt to stem the conflict, only to have Wonder Girl and Supergirl battle against them as well as the military before flying off to Washington D.C., to talk with Hippolyta. Cassie convinces the Amazon queen to engage in peace talks with the U.S. President. When Hippolyta agrees, Cassie promises to bring the U.S. leader to her.

During the fighting in Washington, D.C., Nemesis is stung by several giant venomous Stygian Killer Wasps native to Themyscira. Diana then calls upon Athena to transport her to her homeland in the hopes of retrieving an anti-venom for Nemesis. While on the island Athena refuses to return Diana back to Man's World and stops a missile from destroying her subject's home. Athena then attacks Diana for questioning her actions.

Wonder Girl and Supergirl block the path of Air Force One. The President's guards are powerless against the two superheroes; he agrees to have the plane land. However, a party of Amazon warriors on winged horses attack Air Force One, causing it to crash-land; the President is severely injured. Wonder Girl and Supergirl realize their plan has gone awry; the Amazons press their attack on the downed survivors. Superman enters the fray: his forceful landing creates both a powerful shock-wave and a crater in the ground. He attempts to reason with the stunned Amazons, but just as the warriors are about to react to Superman's entreaties, a hidden troop of U.S. forces slaughter the Amazons with gunfire.

Due to the high-tech weaponry deployed, Batman deduces that the off-Washington attacks are the work of an outside group. When he informs Wonder Woman of his discovery, she informs him that the group must be a rogue tribe of Bana Amazons. Batman leaves for Gotham, intending to dispatch Catwoman to infiltrate the group.

Diana returns to Washington, D.C., with the anti-venom and supplies Nemesis with the cure. Using the Outsider Grace as a shield, the Banas then join forces with Hippolyta and her Amazons in battling the remaining U.S. military forces.

Batman uses a spell given to him by Zatanna that renders Circe powerless for one hour. Wonder Woman confronts Circe, while Hippolyta defends the sorceress. Wonder Woman confronts her mother about the decisions she has made. Since Circe is powerless, Hippolyta is no longer under anyone else's influence: her decisions are her own. Hippolyta throws down her weapon.

Athena appears, displeased with what the Amazons have done and prepared to pass judgment. Circe is banished to Hades. Themyscira rises from the ocean. The Amazons disappear to parts unknown. Hippolyta is exiled to rule over an empty Themyscira.

Athena watches events unfold, with the Greek gods in chains behind her. She reveals that the Amazons have been turned into regular mortal women scattered throughout the world with no memory of their past lives. On the final page of the series, it is revealed that Granny Goodness has imprisoned the Greek gods, incapacitated Athena, and stolen her identity.

== Reception ==
In their review at IGN, Dan Phillips, Jesse Schedeen and Kevin Fuller described the series as "ill-conceived" and "awful". Kevin Powers, reviewing the title at Silver Bullet Comics, described it as "lackluster". The level of displeasure among certain fans led some readers to mail their copies of Amazons Attack back to DC Comics editors.

== Tie-in issues ==
- Catwoman (vol. 3) #69–70
- Supergirl (vol. 5) #20
- Teen Titans (vol. 3) #48–49
- Wonder Woman (vol. 3) #6–13

== Collected editions ==
The series has been collected into a single volume:

- Amazons Attack! (160 pages, hardcover, DC Comics, December 2007, ISBN 1-4012-1543-2, Titan Books, January 2008, ISBN 1-84576-644-X, softcover, July 2009, ISBN 1-4012-1732-X)
