= An Ancient Lie =

Studio album by Mach One
- Released: 2002
- Recorded: 1982–1984
- Studio: Various Studios, London
- Genre: Neo-prog
- Length: 55:00
- Label: Granite Bap

Mach One chronology
Lost for Words (1983)	An Ancient Lie (2002)	Could This Have Been Our Prehistory (1985)

Professional ratings
Review scores
Source	Rating
DPRP	(6/10) by

An Ancient Lie is a compilation of prior releases by the British progressive rock band Mach One. Released in 2002, it included songs like "Into The Pit" from their 1983 LP release Lost For Words (distributed via Pinnacle Records), "No Time To Sleep" from their 1982 cassette release Six of One plus some never before released material such as "Machine In White" recorded in 1984 just before they disbanded.

The album cover featured artwork provided by Glenn Fabry, better known for his work as a British Comics artist.

== Track listing ==
1. "Into the Pit" – 7:59
2. "Amadeus" – 3:22
3. "Essence of Life" – 5:52
4. "Primevil Man" – 3:11
5. "Lovers Only" – 4:16
6. "Shout for Francesca" – 3:20
7. "Sands of Time" – 4:05
8. "Machine in White" – 3:34
9. "Clockwork Subversive" – 2:56
10. "New Worlds" – 2:49
11. "Me" – 3:06
12. "Center of the Universe" – 5:37
13. "No Time to Sleep" – 3:16
14. "That's What It's All About" – 0:49

== Band members ==
- Tim Sprackling – keyboards
- Geoff Sprackling – lead guitar
- Peter Matuchniak – rhythm guitar
- Simon Strevens – drums, backing vocals
- Steve Fisher – lead vocals (1983–84)
- Jon Bankes – bass, backing vocals (1983–84)
- Martin Polley – bass (1981–82)
- Judith – backing vocals, violin
