= Will Pfeifer =

American comic book writer

- Born: William John Pfeifer Jr. July 28, 1967 (age 59) Niles, Ohio
- Area: Comic book writer
- Notable works: Catwoman; Amazons Attack! Red Hood and the Outlaws

William "Will" Pfeifer (born July 28, 1967) is an American comic book writer.

== Career ==
=== Personal life ===
Will Pfeifer was born in 1967 in the town of Niles, Ohio. He attended Kent State University and graduated in 1989. He has resided in Rockford, Illinois since 1990, with his wife, Amy. Pfeifer, along with his comic writing duties, is the former assistant features editor at the Rockford Register Star. He also wrote a weekly DVD column for the Sunday paper during his time there.

=== Comics ===
Pfeifer got his break working with artist Jill Thompson on Vertigo's Finals miniseries.

Pfeifer wrote Catwoman for DC Comics until its cancellation, and temporarily took over for John Rogers on Blue Beetle. He also wrote the Amazons Attack! miniseries, and an issue of Wonder Woman. In July 2014, the series Teen Titans was relaunched with a new issue 1 written by Pfeifer, with art by Kenneth Rocafort.

=== Podcast ===
Pfeifer is a featured host on the Out of Theaters podcast, which launched in April 2015. The podcast leverages Pfeifer's extensive movie knowledge by introducing classic movies to his younger co-host. In September 2016, Pfeifer began co-hosting the Pictures Within Pictures podcast. The show spotlights a comic book series or original graphic novel, dissects it, and puts it into a digestible historical and narrative context. In October 2022, Pfeifer began co-hosting the Film Force 5 podcast discussing movies in various categories and ranking them into top 5 lists with co-hosts and guests.

== Bibliography ==
=== Vertigo Comics ===
- Finals (limited series, July–October 1999)
  - "Back to School" (with Jill Thompson, in #1, 1999)
  - "All-Nighters" (with Jill Thompson, in #2, 1999)
  - "Hell Week" (with Jill Thompson, in #3, 1999)
  - "Pomp & Circumstance Beyond Our Control" (with Jill Thompson, in #4, 1999)
- Flinch #15 (with Robert Valley, September 2000)
- Swamp Thing vol. 4 #7-8 (September–October 2004)
  - "Missing Links" (with Richard Corben, in #7-8, 2004)

=== DC Comics ===
- Bizarro Comics, "The GL Corps: The Few, the Proud" (anthology, hc, 224 pages, 2001, ISBN 1-56389-779-2)
- JSA Secret Files and Origins, "Pulling the Mask from History's Face" (July 2001)
- Guide to the DC Universe Secret Files and Origins 2001-2002, "A Year in the Life" (with Anthony Williams, December 2001)
- Cartoon Cartoons #13, "Brak Talk" (with Matt Jenkins, September 2002)
- H.E.R.O. (February 2003-November 2004)
  - Power and Abilities (tpb, 144 pages, 2003, ISBN 1-4012-0168-7)
    - "Powers and Abilities" (with Kano, in #1-4, 2003)
    - "Meet Matt Allen" (with Kano, in #5, 2003)
    - "Girl Power" (with Kano, in #6, 2003)
  - "Don't Try This @ Home" (with Patrick Gleason, in #7-8, 2003)
  - "A World Made of Glass" (with Kano, in #9-10, 2003)
  - "The Great Leap Forward" (with Kano, in #11, 2003)
  - "Ch-Ch-Ch-Changes" (with Leonard Kirk, in #12-14, 2004)
  - "Whatever Happened To Robby Reed?" (with Dale Eaglesham, in #15, 2004)
  - "Goodguys & Badguys" (with Dale Eaglesham, in #16-18, 2004)
  - "Pieces of Hate" (with Dale Eaglesham, in #19-21, 2004)
  - "Picking Up The Pieces" (with Dale Eaglesham, in #22, 2004)
- Batman: Gotham Knights #46, "Urban Renewal" (with Brent Anderson, October 2003)
- Aquaman vol. 6 #15-22 (February–September 2004)
  - Sub-Diego (tpb, 192 pages, 2015, ISBN 1-4012-5510-8) collects:
    - "American Tidal" (with Patrick Gleason, in #15-20, 2004)
    - "With the Fishes" (with Patrick Gleason, in #21-22, 2004)
- Blood of the Demon #1-17 (March 2005-July 2006)
  - "Born Again" (with John Byrne, in #1, 2005)
  - "Hunters" (with John Byrne, in #2, 2005)
  - "Friends and Enemies" (with John Byrne, in #3, 2005)
  - "Masks" (with John Byrne, in #4, 2005)
  - "Today We Choose Faces" (with John Byrne, in #5, 2005)
  - "The Gathering Storm" (with John Byrne, in #6, 2005)
  - "Cages of the Mind" (with John Byrne, in #7, 2005)
  - "Mind Games" (with John Byrne, in #8, 2005)
  - "Tortured Souls" (with John Byrne, in #9, 2005)
  - "New Gods and Old Monsters" (with John Byrne, in #10, 2005)
  - "Angels & Devils" (with John Byrne, in #11, 2006)
  - "Wrath Of The Lamb" (with John Byrne, in #12, 2006)
  - "Demon Quest" (with John Byrne, in #13, 2006)
  - "This Painful Existence" (with John Byrne, in #14, 2006)
  - "Lost & Found" (with John Byrne, in #15, 2006)
  - "Pandemonium" (with John Byrne, in #16, 2006)
  - "The End" (with John Byrne, in #17, 2006)
- Batman Allies Secret Files and Origins 2005, "Street Crime" (with Ron Randall, June 2005)
- Catwoman vol. 3 #44-82 (June 2005-July 2008)
  - Volume 4: The One You Love (tpb, 240 pages, 2015, ISBN 1-4012-5832-8) collects:
    - "The One You Love" (with Pete Woods, in #44-49, 2005)
  - Volume 5: Backward Masking (tpb, 232 pages, 2016, ISBN 1-4012-6073-X) collects:
    - "Backward Masking" (with Pete Woods, in #50-52, 2005-2006)
    - "The Replacements" (with David López, in #53-57, 2016)
    - "Memories Are Made of This" (with David López, in #58, 2006)
    - "It's Only a Movie" (with David López, in #59-61, 2006)
    - "Sons and Daughters" (with David López, in #62, 2006)
    - "The Paperweight" (with David López, in #63-65, 2007)
  - Catwoman Dies (tpb, 168 pages, 2008, ISBN 1-4012-1643-9) collects:
    - "Catwoman Dies" (with David López, in #66-68, 2007)
    - "Life During Wartime" (with David López, in #69-70, 2007)
    - "Mother's Day" (with David López, in #71, 2007)
    - "Crime Pays" (with David López, #72, 2007)
  - Crime Pays (tpb, 144 pages, 2008, ISBN 1-4012-1929-2) collects:
    - "Crime Pays" (with David López, #73-74, 2007)
    - "Waking Up on the Wrong Side of the Universe" (with David López, in #75-77, 2008)
  - The Long Road Home (tpb, 144 pages, 2009, ISBN 1-4012-2168-8) collects:
    - "The Long Road Home" (with David López, #78-79, 2008)
    - "Final Jeopardy" (with David López, #80-82, 2008)
- Batman: Legends of the Dark Knight #197-199 (November 2005-January 2006)
  - "Blaze of Glory: The Spark" (with Chris Weston, in #197, 2005)
  - "Blaze of Glory: The Fuse" (with Chris Weston, in #198, 2005)
  - "Blaze of Glory: The Fire" (with Chris Weston, in #199, 2006)
- Crisis Aftermath: The Spectre (limited series, June–August 2006)
  - Crisis Aftermath: The Spectre (tpb, 144 pages, 2007, ISBN 1-4012-1380-4) collects:
    - "Dead Again" (with Cliff Chiang, in #1-3, 2006)
- Amazons Attack! (limited series, April–August 2007)
  - Wonder Woman: Amazons Attack! (hc, 160 pages, 2007, ISBN 1-4012-1543-2) collects:
    - "The Last Full Measure of Devotion" (with Pete Woods, in #1, 2007)
    - "Battle Lines" (with Pete Woods, in #2, 2007)
    - "The Road to Hell" (with Pete Woods, in #3, 2007)
    - "Things Fall Apart" (with Pete Woods, in #4, 2007)
    - "Trouble on the Home Front" (with Pete Woods, in #5, 2007)
    - "Pyrrhic Victory" (with Pete Woods, in #6, 2007)
- Wonder Woman vol. 3 #5, "Gimme Shelter" (with Geraldo Borjes and Jean Diaz, March 2007)
- Blue Beetle vol. 8 #27-28 (May–June 2008)
  - Black and Blue (tpb, 168 page, 2010, ISBN 1-4012-2897-6) collects:
    - "Black Magic Woman" (with David Baldeon, in #27, 2008)
    - "Brutus" (with David Baldeon, in #28, 2008)
- Spirit vol. 2 #17, "Art Walk" (with P. Craig Russell, August 2011)
- Red Hood and the Outlaws #29-31 (March 2014-May 2014)
  - Volume 5: The Big Picture (tpb, 160 pages, 2014, ISBN 1-4012-5048-3) collects:
    - "The Big Picture" (with Rafa Sandoval and R. B. Silva, in #29-31, 2014)
- Teen Titans vol. 5 #1-16 (July 2014-January 2016)
  - Volume 1: Blinded by the Light (tpb, 176 pages, 2015, ISBN 1-4012-5237-0) collects:
    - "Blinded by the Light" (with Kenneth Rocafort, in #1-4, 2014)
    - "Human Resources" (with Scott Hepburn, in #5-6, 2014-2015)
    - "One Brief, Shining Moment" (with Kenneth Rocafort, in #7, 2015)
  - Volume 2: Rogue Targets (tpb, 192 pages, 2016, ISBN 1-4012-6162-0) collects:
    - "Divergence: Teen Titans" (with Kenneth Rocafort, in Convergence: Superboy and the Legion of Super-Heroes #2, 2015)
    - "One Brief, Shining Moment" (with Kenneth Rocafort, in #8, 2015)
    - "Rogue Targets" (with Kenneth Rocafort, Felipe Watanabe, Ricken, Scott Lobdell, Ian Churchill, Paolo Pantalena, Noel Rodriguez and Scott McDaniel, in #9-13, 2015)
    - "The Source of Mercy" (with Tom King, Alisson Borges and Wes St. Claire, in Annual vol. 5 #1, 2015)
  - Volume 3: The Sum of Its Parts (tpb, 144 pages, 2016, ISBN 1-4012-6520-0) collects:
    - "Aftermath" (with Scott Lobdell, Noel Rodriguez and Scott McDaniel, in #14, 2015)
    - "On the Run; A Tale from Robin War" (with Scott Lobdell, Ian Churchill and Miguel Mendoça, in #15, 2015)
    - "The Sum of its Parts" (with Miguel Mendoça, in #16, 2016)
- Teen Titans: Future Ends #1, "Team Effort" (with Andy Smith, September 2014) collected in Futures End: Five Years Later Omnibus (hc, 912 pages, 2014, ISBN 1-4012-5129-3)

=== Marvel Comics ===
- X-Men Unlimited #32-33 (with Jill Thompson, Walter Taborda, Esteban Maroto and Quique Alcatena, July–October 2001)
- Iron Man 2.0. #10-12 (November 2011-December 2011)
  - Volume 2: Asymmetry (tpb, 128 pages, 2012, ISBN 0-7851-4751-9) collects:
    - "The Palmer Addley Infection" (with Nick Spencer, Ariel Olivetti and Carmine Di Giandomenico, 2011)

=== WildStorm Productions ===
- Wildstorm Winter Special, antologhy, "Small World, After All" (with Scott Iwahashi, in November 2005)
- Captain Atom: Armageddon #1-9 (limited series, September 2005-June 2006)
  - Captain Atom: Armageddon (tpb, 224 pages, 2006, ISBN 1-4012-1106-2) collects:
    - "A Scream Across the Sky" (with Giuseppe Camuncoli, in #1, 2005)
    - "Brave New World" (with Giuseppe Camuncoli, in #2, 2005)
    - "Power Struggle" (with Giuseppe Camuncoli, in #3, 2005)
    - "Fight Scene" (with Giuseppe Camuncoli, in #4, 2006)
    - "No Exit" (with Giuseppe Camuncoli, in #5, 2006)
    - "Sometimes When We Touch..." (with Giuseppe Camuncoli, in #6, 2006)
    - "Who Says the World Needs Saving" (with Giuseppe Camuncoli, in #7, 2006)
    - "Lessons in Nuclear Physics" (with Giuseppe Camuncoli, in #8, 2006)
    - "The End" (with Giuseppe Camuncoli and Jim Lee, in #9, 2006)
- The Texas Chainsaw Massacre: Cut! (with Stefano Raffaele, in June 2007)

=== Tor Books ===
- The Advance Team (graphic novel with Germán Torres, tpb, 176 pages, March 2012, ISBN 0-7653-2712-0)

Preceded by John Ostrander	Aquaman writer 2004	Succeeded by John Ostrander
Preceded by Andy Diggle	Swamp Thing writer 2004	Succeeded by Joshua Dysart
Preceded by Ed Brubaker	Catwoman writer 2005–2008	Succeeded by Tony Bedard
Preceded by Allan Heinberg	Wonder Woman writer 2007	Succeeded by Jodi Picoult
Preceded by John Rogers	Blue Beetle writer 2008	Succeeded by Matthew Sturges
Preceded by Scott Lobdell	Teen Titans writer 2014-2016	Succeeded by Greg Pak
