= Mach One =

British neo-prog band

- Origin: England
- Genres: Neo-prog
- Years active: 1980–1985
- Members: Tim Sprackling; Geoff Sprackling; Peter Matuchniak; Simon Strevens; Steve Fisher; Jon Bankes
- Past members: Steve Whalley; Martin Polley; Dave Polley
- Website: www.myspace.com/machone1

Mach One are a British neo-prog band, founded in 1980 by a group of students attending Burlington Danes High School in West London. After a series of studio demos, school gigs and lineup changes, the band attracted the attention of Keith Goodwin (notable as publicist for Yes, Rod Argent, Black Sabbath, in the 1970s, and Marillion in the 1980s) who represented them through 1983-85. During this time Mach One embarked on a series of live shows at pubs and clubs around London, and universities across England, while releasing two albums, Six of One and Lost for Words, that featured prominently in underground progressive rock fanzines (such as the Genesis Fanzine called Afterglow) and specialist progressive rock catalogues. However, in the more mainstream press they received mixed reviews for their second album, including a humorous 1-star review by Mary Anne Hobbs in Sounds (a British music paper), although their live show was given a positive write-up in the same paper a few weeks thereafter by journalist Gareth Thompson.

In 1984 they established a residency at The Cafe Emil in Kensington, London, one of the few places where they regularly sold out. Any success beyond this eluded them, and when Pinnacle Records, their main distribution company, declared bankruptcy the band decided to call it a day.

The band briefly reformed in 1985 as a smaller three-piece to record material for a new concept album titled Could This Have Been Our Prehistory. Although this has yet to be released officially, they did play the whole album live in its entirety at a few gigs in London but there was no plans to continue beyond that. Later that summer they were asked to play a last minute support gig at London's famous Marquee Club but it was the last time they were ever to play live.

== Line-ups and the neo-progressive movement ==
Mach One were one of a small number of British bands formed during the early 1980s, including Marillion, Pendragon, IQ, Twelfth Night, Pallas and Janysium, that was associated with the Progressive Rock revival of that decade, often referred to as the "Neo Progressive Rock Movement". The initial Mach One lineup founded by brothers Tim and Geoff Sprackling was more aligned with a straightforward rock style, with influences by the likes of Jimi Hendrix, Deep Purple and Led Zeppelin.

The final lineup changes introduced yet more influences such as David Bowie and Bauhaus from new singer Steve Fisher, and the styles of blues and funk from bassist Jon Bankes. The overall effect of these varied influences appeared to cause consternation amongst some of the more traditional progressive rock fans.

== Band members ==
=== 1985 line-up ===
- Tim Sprackling – keyboards
- Geoff Sprackling – lead guitar, rhythm guitar, bass
- Peter Matuchniak – rhythm and lead guitar, bass, backing vocals

=== 1983-84 line-up ===
- Tim Sprackling – keyboards
- Geoff Sprackling – lead guitar
- Peter Matuchniak – rhythm guitar
- Simon Strevens – drums, backing vocals
- Steve Fisher – lead vocals
- Jon Bankes – bass, backing vocals

=== 1981-82 line-up ===
- Tim Sprackling – keyboards
- Geoff Sprackling – lead guitar
- Peter Matuchniak – rhythm guitar
- Simon Strevens – drums, lead vocals
- Martin Polley – bass

=== 1980 line-up ===
- Tim Sprackling – keyboards
- Geoff Sprackling – lead guitar
- Martin Polley – bass
- Dave Polley – drums
- Steve Whalley – rhythm guitar, lead vocals

== Discography ==
=== Albums ===
- Studio Sessions (cassette) (1982)
- Six of One (cassette) (1983)
- Lost for Words (LP) (1984) (distributed via Pinnacle Records
- Could This Have Been Our Prehistory (CD) (1985) (pending release)

=== Compilations ===
- An Ancient Lie (CD) (2000) (compilation from 1981–1984)

== Bibliography ==
- Lucky, Jerry. The Progressive Rock Files. Burlington, Ontario: Collector's Guide Publishing, Inc (1998), 304 pages, ISBN 1-896522-10-6 (paperback). Gives an overview of progressive rock's history as well as histories of the major and underground bands in the genre. Mentions the release of Mach One's LP Lost for Words in the 1983-84 chapter.
