= Tony Moore (artist) =

American comic-book artist

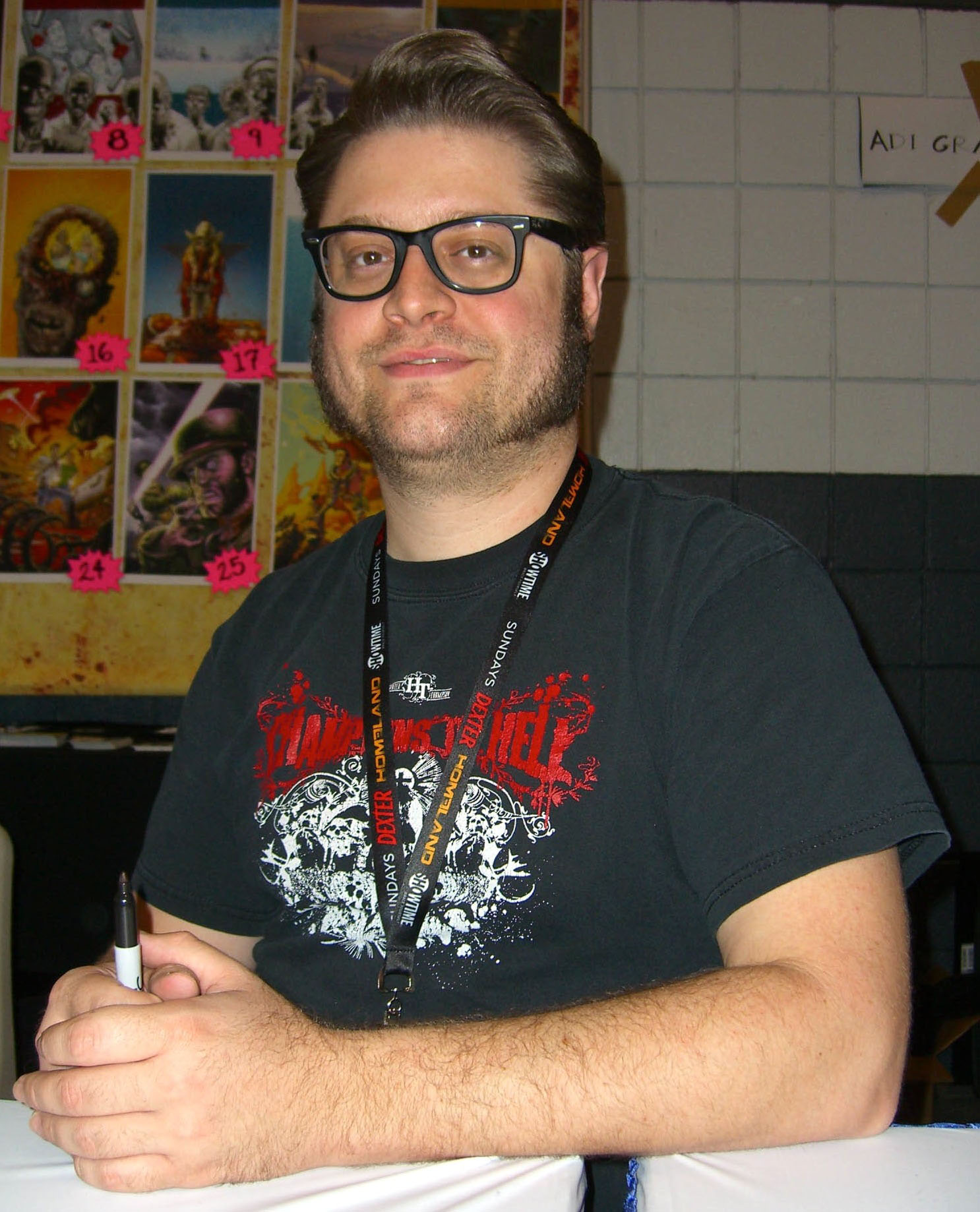
- Moore at the 2011 New York Comic Con
- Born: Cynthiana, Kentucky, U.S.
- Areas: Penciller, Inker, Colourist
- Pseudonym: Tony
- Notable works: The Walking Dead; The Exterminators; Fear Agent; Brit
- Awards: Eisner Award nominations: 2004: "Best New Series" (The Walking Dead); 2005: "Best Cover Artist" (The Walking Dead)

Tony Moore is an American comic-book artist whose work consists mainly of genre pieces, most notably in horror and science fiction, with titles such as Fear Agent, The Exterminators, and the first six issues of The Walking Dead. He also co-created the Invincible Universe character Brit.

== Career ==
Moore's first comic-book work was the 2000 superhero parody Battle Pope, which he co-created with his childhood friend, writer Robert Kirkman. Self-published under the Funk-O-Tron label, it was adapted into a season of eight animated webisodes that appeared on Spike TV's website in 2008. While working on Battle Pope, Kirkman and Moore were asked to produce work for the Mattel-licensed Masters of the Universe property. Shortly afterward, they launched Brit and The Walking Dead at Image Comics. Although Moore ceased regular interior art on The Walking Dead with #6, he continued to contribute to the title as cover artist through issue #24, and illustrated the covers for the series' first four collected volumes. Moore was nominated for two Eisner Awards for his work on The Walking Dead, (2004: "Best New Series", and 2005: Best Cover Artist.) Because of the popularity of the series, which increased considerably when it was adapted into a television series of the same name, Moore's original artwork for the series' early issues has gone up in value. On the March 28, 2013, episode of the VH1 reality television series For What It's Worth, Moore's original artwork for Page 7 of issue #1 was professionally appraised to be worth $20,000.

Moore has since co-created The Exterminators with Simon Oliver at DC/Vertigo, and Fear Agent with Rick Remender at Dark Horse Comics, and has contributed covers to numerous titles, including Claudio Sanchez's The Amory Wars and Rob Zombie's Spookshow International. He has also contributed to Marvel Comics' titles Ghost Rider (with Jason Aaron), and Punisher (with Rick Remender). He also was the artist for the Venom series from 2010 to 2012, also written by Remender.

On February 9, 2012, Moore filed a lawsuit alleging that in 2005, Kirkman deceitfully engineered him into surrendering his rights to The Walking Dead comic book and eventual TV series in exchange for payments that never materialized. Kirkman said in a statement the following day that he and Moore "each had legal representation seven years ago and now he is violating the same contract he initiated and approved and he wants to misrepresent the fees he was paid and continues to be paid for the work he was hired to do." Kirkman in turn sued Moore. On September 24, 2012, the two released a joint statement saying they had reached a settlement "to everyone's mutual satisfaction."

In 2018, Moore began collaborating with country musician and fellow Kentuckian Tyler Childers, doing the cover art for Childers' album, Country Squire. Moore illustrated a small promotional Chick tract parody comic, written by Childers, which was released with the album. Moore also produced several screen printed concert posters for Childers. In 2019, Moore designed the animated band featured in the music video for the Grammy-nominated song, All Your'n, directed by Matt Stawski, though the final renderings were painted by longtime Stawski collaborator, artist Serge Gay Jr. In 2020, Moore wrote, designed, storyboarded, and directed the animated music video for the album's title track, Country Squire.

== Bibliography ==
Interior comic work includes:

- Battle Pope #1–5, 8, 10–13 (with Robert Kirkman, Funk-O-Tron, 2000–2002)
- Kieron Dwyer's LCD #3: "Lockdown Laffs" (script and art, anthology, FogelComix, 2002)
- 9-11 Volume 1: "Untitled" (with Robert Kirkman, anthology graphic novel, Dark Horse, 2002)
- Masters of the Universe: Icons of Evil — Beast Man (with Robert Kirkman, one-shot, MVCreations, 2003)
- Brit and Brit: Cold Death (with Robert Kirkman, one-shots, Image, 2003)
- The Walking Dead #1–6 (with Robert Kirkman, Image, 2003–2004)
- Fear Agent (with Rick Remender):
  - "Re-Ignition" (with Jerome Opeña, in #1–4, Image, 2005–2006)
  - Fear Agent: The Last Goodbye #1–4 (Dark Horse, 2007)
  - "I Against I" (in #22–27, Dark Horse, 2008–2009)
  - "Out of Step" (with Mike Hawthorne, in #28–32, Dark Horse, 2010–2011)
- Western Tales of Terror #5: "Know When to Hold 'em" (with Matty Field, anthology, Hoarse and Buggy, 2005)
- 24Seven Volume 1: "Fear and Loathing in NYC" (with Jonathan L. Davis, anthology graphic novel, Image, 2006)
- The Exterminators #1–7, 9–10, 13–14, 24–25, 28–30 (with Simon Oliver, Vertigo, 2006–2008)
- XXXombies #1–4 (co-written with Rick Remender, art by Kieron Dwyer, Image, 2007–2008)
- The Goon: Noir #3: "The Honey Pot" (with Brian Posehn, anthology, Dark Horse, 2007)
- Ghost Rider vol. 4 #33–35: "Trials and Tribulations" (with Jason Aaron, Marvel, 2009)
- The Punisher vol. 8 #11–14, 16, 19–20 (with Rick Remender, Mike Hawthorne (#13) and Dan Brereton (#14), Marvel, 2010)
- Venom vol. 2 #1-2, 4–5, 13–14 (with Rick Remender and Tom Fowler (#5), Marvel, 2011–2012)
- Deadpool vol. 3 #1–6: "Dead Presidents" (with Brian Posehn and Gerry Duggan, Marvel, 2012–2013)
- Thor vol. 5 #7: "Young Thor's Lament" (with Jason Aaron, Marvel, 2018)

=== Covers only ===
- Rob Zombie's Spookshow International #7 (MVCreations, 2004)
- Western Tales of Terror #1 (Hoarse and Buggy, 2004)
- The Walking Dead #7–24, 150 (Image, 2004–2016)
- Tales from the Bully Pulpit #1 (Image, 2004)
- Sea of Red #1–3, 8–10 (Image, 2005–2006)
- Battle Hymn #5 (Image, 2005)
- Army of Darkness #8 (Dynamite, 2006)
- The Last Christmas #5 (Image, 2006)
- Fear Agent #5–11, 21 (Image/Dark Horse, 2006–2008)
- Tales of the Fear Agent: Twelve Steps in One #1 (Dark Horse, 2007)
- The Amory Wars vol. 1 #1–5 + vol. 2 #1–5 (Image, 2007–2008)
- Pilot Season: Ripclaw #1 (Top Cow, 2007)
- Ghost Rider vol. 4 #18 (Marvel, 2008)
- Deadpool: Merc with a Mouth #2 (Marvel, 2009)
- Victorian Undead #1 (Wildstorm, 2010)
- Key of Z #1 (Boom! Studios, 2011)
- Venom vol. 2 #6–8, 10–12, 15, 18–19, 21–22 (Marvel, 2011–2012)
- American Vampire: The Long Road to Hell #1 (Vertigo, 2013)
- Batman vol. 2 #32 (DC Comics, 2014)
- Detective Comics vol. 2 #33 (DC Comics, 2014)
- Nameless #1 (Image, 2015)
- Deadpool vol. 3 #45 (Marvel, 2015)
- Southern Bastards #9 (Image, 2015)
- Attack on Titan Volume 16 (Kodansha, 2015)
- Star Wars vol. 4 #7 (Marvel, 2015)
- Invincible Iron Man vol. 2 #1 (Marvel, 2015)
- Sam Wilson: Captain America #2 (Marvel, 2015)
- Deadpool vol. 4 #1–3, 5, 7 (Marvel, 2016)
- Seven to Eternity #1 (Image, 2016)
- Zombies Assemble #1 (Marvel, 2017)
- The Realm #1 (Image, 2017)
- The Despicable Deadpool #300 (Marvel, 2018)
- Dollman Kills the Full Moon Universe #1 (Full Moon, 2018)
- Hulkverines #2 (Marvel, 2019)
- Venom vol. 4 #19 (Marvel, 2019)
- Punisher Kill Krew #1–5 (Marvel, 2019–2020)
- Marauders #2 (Marvel, 2020)
