= FBP: Federal Bureau of Physics =

Sci-fi comic book

Publication information
- Publisher: Vertigo Comics (DC)
- Schedule: Monthly
- Format: Ongoing series
- Publication date: July 2013 – Nov 2015
- No. of issues: 24
- Main character: Adam Hardy

Creative team
- Created by: Simon Oliver and Robbi Rodriguez
- Written by: Simon Oliver
- Penciller: Robbi Rodriguez
- Inker: Robbi Rodriguez
- Colorist: Rico Renzi

FBP: Federal Bureau of Physics is an American comic book series by Simon Oliver and Robbi Rodriguez, published by Vertigo Comics. FBP imagines a world where disturbances in the laws of physics are as common as weather, and necessitate forecasts about wormhole locations, momentary gravity losses, and entropy reversals. With much fanfare, the government creates a new bureaucratic organization to deal with quantum disturbances, the Federal Bureau of Physics. The story follows special agent Adam Hardy as he deals with internal departmental battles and increasingly dangerous and radical quantum disasters.

== Publication history ==
=== Original title ===
The original title of the series was Collider. When Vertigo published the first issue under that name, beActive, an Irish comics publisher, took legal action and forced Vertigo to change the title to FBP: Federal Bureau of Physics. While Oliver said he was ambivalent about changing the name, the process of creating a new title allowed the creative team an opportunity to "really get back examine to the nuts and bolts, and kick the tires of what the book's really all about".

Vertigo published 24 issues of Collider/FBP from 2013 to 2015.

== In other media ==
In 2014, Warner Bros. was in development of a film version of FBP with Justin Marks penning the script, while produced by David S. Goyer and Nellie Reed.

== Collected editions ==
Title	Material collected	Publication date	ISBN
FBP: Federal Bureau of Physics Vol 1: The Paradigm Shift	FBP: Federal Bureau of Physics #1–7	February 2014	9781401245108
FBP: Federal Bureau of Physics Vol 2: Wish You Were Here	FBP: Federal Bureau of Physics #8–13	September 2014	9781401250676
FBP: Federal Bureau of Physics Vol 3: Standing on Shoulders	FBP: Federal Bureau of Physics #14–19	May 2015	9781401254346
FBP: Federal Bureau of Physics Vol 4: The End Times	FBP: Federal Bureau of Physics #20–24	Jan 6 2016	9781401258450
