= The Exterminators (comics) =

Vertigo comic book series

Publication information
- Publisher: Vertigo
- Schedule: Monthly
- Format: Ongoing series (canceled at issue #30)
- Publication date: March 2006 – August 2008
- No. of issues: 30
- Main character(s): Henry James; Laura; Stretch; Page Christie; Kevin; Nils Peterson; Dr. Saloth Sar

Creative team
- Created by: Simon Oliver; Tony Moore
- Written by: Simon Oliver
- Artist(s): Tony Moore (interior art); Philip Bond; Darick Robertson (covers)
- Penciller(s): Tony Moore, Darick Robertson, John Lucas, and others
- Inker(s): Ande Parks; Sean Parsons; Tony Moore
- Colorist: Brian Buccellato

Collected editions
- Bug Brothers: ISBN 1-4012-1064-3
- Insurgency: ISBN 1-4012-1221-2
- Lies of our Fathers: ISBN 1-4012-1475-4
- Crossfire and Collateral: ISBN 1-4012-1685-4
- Bug Brothers Forever: ISBN 1-4012-1970-5

The Exterminators is an American monthly comic book series, published under the Vertigo imprint by DC Comics. The comic was created by writer Simon Oliver and artist Tony Moore and follows the employees of the Bug-Bee-Gone extermination company. The book is notable for its graphic and darkly humorous take on the extermination business. The first issue was released on January 4, 2006 and the series finished at issue #30, initially been envisioned as a 50-issue series.

== History ==
The Exterminators initial incarnation was a TV pitch and pilot outline as writer Simon Oliver was working in the film industry at the time. After consideration, Oliver realized the story wasn't really network material. Oliver then decided to pitch it to a comic book publisher. A film producer friend of Oliver had become good friends with Karen Berger of Vertigo Comics after they had discussed 100 Bullets. Through this friend, the pitch of The Exterminators reached an interested publisher. After some reworking with editor Jon Vankin, the project was greenlit and the first issue was released in January 2006.

A short preview of the comic before its initial release appeared in an issue of Y: The Last Man.

== Story ==
=== Characters ===
The main character of The Exterminators is Henry James. Fresh out of jail, he starts working for his stepfather Nils Peterson's extermination company Bug-Bee-Gone. Henry lives in an apartment with his girlfriend Laura, a high level employee of Ocran Industries, manufacturers of chemical products. One of these products is Draxx, a new poisonous gel for exterminating cockroaches. Draxx has some serious side effects which have been discovered by Dr. Saloth Sar, the in house scientist of Bug-Bee-Gone (Saloth Sar is also the birth name of the infamous Cambodian leader Pol Pot).

=== Plot ===
Henry is training with his partner, AJ, under Bug-Be-Gone, an extermination company run by Henry's father, Nils. Henry is out of prison, and after AJ overdoses on Draxx, the insect-killing gel that Bug-Be-Gone uses, the police try to solve a break-in at the extermination company.

Sal, the head scientist at Bug-Be-Gone, discovers that insects mutate after prolonged exposure to Draxx, skipping their evolution up several generations. After Henry and his new partner clean out a run-down apartment complex and a swarm of mutant cockroaches attack them, Henry breaks up with his girlfriend who is working at the company that produces Draxx and plans to market it as a street drug to wipe out poorer neighborhoods.

One of the apartment's mutated cockroaches finds the resurrected AJ, now calling himself CJ, who is actually a reborn Egyptian pharaoh who worships insects. CJ murders one of the employees of Bug-Be-Gone to prove himself to the mutant roach leaders, as fruit from Madagascar infested with Hisser cockroaches is shipped to America. The hissers eat the Draxx, and evolve into Mayan hissers, responsible for that civilization's destruction. Henry's ex-girlfriend, now the head of the Draxx producing company, is herself removed from the board after the hissers paralyze her, and Henry moves on to a new girlfriend.

CJ, now recognized as the resurrected pharaoh, attacks the city with the hissers as Henry and the other exterminators destroy them. In the final battle Henry loses an eye, and he marries his new girlfriend.

=== The Box ===
The box in question is of unknown origins, though it carries a distinct Egyptian motif. Henry James found it in AJ's truck just before AJ died, and the subsequent flashback sequence indicates that the box was found during AJ's stint in the Marine Corps, in the Gulf War. The box appears to be made of stone, and has an elaborately carved scarab on one side. On another are four keyholes and a swastika. It is entirely possible that the box is Egyptian, as it may have been carried by Roman soldiers into Iraq, and then rediscovered sometime before AJ's military service.

The box's significance is elaborated on in issue #25.

== Adaptations ==
In July 2008, Showtime announced that it would develop the Vertigo series as a one-hour drama. Executive producer Sara Colleton's credits include the Showtime hit drama Dexter. Later in February 2011, Oliver revealed in an interview that the project is currently in limbo.

== Collected editions ==
#	Title	ISBN	Publication date	Reprinted issues
1	Bug Brothers	ISBN 1-4012-1064-3	August 2, 2006	The Exterminators #1–5
2	Insurgency	ISBN 978-1-4012-1221-6	March 7, 2007	The Exterminators #6-10
3	Lies of Our Fathers	ISBN 978-1-4012-1475-3	September 12, 2007	The Exterminators #11-16
4	Crossfire and Collateral	ISBN 978-1-4012-1685-6	April 30, 2008	The Exterminators #17-23
5	Bug Brothers Forever	ISBN 978-1-4012-1970-3	November 12, 2008	The Exterminators #24-30
