= Janysium =

British rock band

- Origin: England
- Genres: Neo-prog
- Years active: 1980–1982, 1985–1987, 1999–2000
- Label: Granite Bap
- Members: Peter Matuchniak; Simon Strevens
- Past members: Sean Lewis; Martin Polley
- Website: Official website

Janysium are a British neo-prog band, founded in 1980 by two pupils from Little Ealing Middle School; Peter Matuchniak and Simon Strevens. Their debut release in 1982 attracted the attention of Phil Collins via a chance meeting with his mother, and was also given a positive review in the Official Genesis Fan Club quarterly magazine.

== The Neo-Progressive movement ==
Janysium were one of a small number of British bands formed during the early 1980s, including Marillion, Pendragon, IQ, Twelfth Night, Pallas and Mach One, that was associated with the progressive rock revival of that decade, often referred to as the "Neo Progressive Rock Movement". Initially their sound was likened to progressive bands like Camel and Genesis, although they later experimented with a more updated sound, influenced by current bands at the time such as Duran Duran.

Interesting post note: The band got its name from Peter Matuchniak overhearing a conversation about the singer Janis Ian, and interpreting this as Janysium.

== Line-ups and output ==
During 1981-82 two members joined Janysium, Sean Lewis (keyboards) and Martin Polley (bass guitar), to rehearse and record their first studio sessions. The original members Matuchniak and Strevens remained the core of Janysium throughout, although both abandoned their project with the band when they merged with fellow musicians in Mach One from 1982 to 1985. After the breakup of Mach One, Matuchniak and Strevens resumed writing and recording in late 1985-86 but this time as a duet only. In 1987, they performed as a guest act for Rock Machine (later known as Indus Creed under CBS) in front of 4,000 people at the Rang Bhavan in Bombay, India under the name "The Various Artists". This followed several months there recording jingles for television advertisements shown nationally on Indian TV.

== Other projects ==
Matuchniak formed the progressive rock band Evolve IV in 2003, and Strevens played in Still (1990s) and The Noun (2000s). Lewis became a producer/engineer of classical music at Naxos Records. Polley dropped out of music entirely, focusing on publishing books on the history of sports, and is a lecturer at Southampton University.

== Band members ==
- Peter Matuchniak – rhythm and lead guitar
- Simon Strevens – drums, vocals, keyboards
- Sean Lewis - keyboards (1981–82)
- Martin Polley - bass (1981–82)

== Discography ==
=== Albums ===
- Studio Sessions (cassette) (1982)
- Half a Dozen of the Other (cassette) (1983)

== Notes ==
- Lucky, Jerry. The Progressive Rock Files. Burlington, Ontario: Collector's Guide Publishing, Inc (1998), 304 pages, ISBN 1-896522-10-6 (paperback). Gives an overview of progressive rock's history as well as histories of the major and underground bands in the genre. Lists Janysium in the appendix, as well as the release of their so-called 'sister-band' Mach One's LP Lost for Words in the 1983-84 chapter.
