= Hellblazer Presents: Chas – The Knowledge =

Comic book limited series

Hellblazer Presents: Chas - The Knowledge
- Cover to issue #1 of Hellblazer Presents: Chas - The Knowledge. Art by Glenn Fabry and Tony Luke.

Publication information
- Publisher: Vertigo
- Schedule: Monthly
- Format: Limited series
- Publication date: July 2008 - January 2009
- No. of issues: 5

Creative team
- Written by: Simon Oliver
- Artist: Goran Sudžuka
- Letterer: Clem Robins
- Colorist: Matt Hollingsworth
- Editor(s): Mark Doyle; Jonathan Vankin

Collected editions
- Hellblazer: Chas: ISBN 1-4012-2127-0

Hellblazer Presents: Chas – The Knowledge is a comic book limited series, written by Simon Oliver, with artwork by Goran Sudžuka, and cover art by Glenn Fabry. It is a spin-off from the Vertigo series Hellblazer, featuring John Constantine's oldest and closest friend, Francis 'Chas' Chandler.

The first issue was printed in July 2008. The series ran for five issues, and was later collected in trade paperback format.

== Issues ==
=== #1 ===
Cab driver Francis "Chas" Chandler leads an unremarkable existence. His greatest moments have come tagging along with John Constantine—as a chauffeur. His home life is nothing special, and his beloved London is becoming a soulless metropolis. In middle age, Chas is stuck in a rut.

But Chas is a master of The Knowledge, the elaborate system of routes and landmarks which every London cabbie must memorize. Until now, The Knowledge has been just a tool for Chas. But now, he is about to discover a more sinister significance of The Knowledge.

An ominous entity from London's grim history has reemerged, and only someone with The Knowledge can stop it.

=== #2 ===
A demon is loose in London, but John Constantine is on a beach in Ibiza with a mai tai and a Brazilian model. That leaves Chas alone to solve a bloody mystery – but when one of his old friends goes missing and a new friend emerges to turn his life upside down, saving the city is the last thing on Chas's overburdened mind.

=== #3 ===
Chas continues to have emotional problems just when London needs him the most. John is off in a tropical paradise causing trouble, a new women tempts Chandler and old promises go neglected.

=== #4 ===
The demon possessing Chas's would-be protégé, Nicky, has unlocked the secrets of "The Knowledge", and now it is looking to rip the soul right out of London. A football match between two of the city's most heated rivals creates a moment of decision in the life of Chas.

=== #5 ===
The demon Tuma'el stands poised to take control of London's very soul. Chas has managed to array a small group of friends and allies, which does not include John, to fight back against the demonic force.

== Reception ==
The first issue sold an estimated 10,463 issues putting it at 182 in the Diamond Comic Distributors sales table.

== Collected editions ==
The series has been collected into a trade paperback:

- Hellblazer: Chas (128 pages, Vertigo, April 2009, ISBN 1-4012-2127-0)
