= Greatest Hits (comics) =

- Cover to Greatest Hits #1 (November 2008), art by Glenn Fabry.

Publication information
- Publisher: Vertigo
- Schedule: Monthly
- Format: Limited series
- Genre: Superhero
- Publication date: November 2008 – April 2009
- No. of issues: 6
- Main character(s): Solicitor; Crusader; Vizier; Zipper; Golem

Creative team
- Created by: David Tischman; Glenn Fabry
- Written by: David Tischman
- Artist: Glenn Fabry
- Letterer: Todd Klein
- Colorist(s): Richard Horie; Tanya Horie
- Editor: Shelly Bond

Greatest Hits is a six-issue comic book limited series, published in 2008 by DC Comics as a part of the Vertigo imprint. The series was written by David Tischman, with art by Glenn Fabry.

The series focuses on The Mates, a super-powered foursome from The Sixties, in the first superhero series from Vertigo since Grant Morrison's The Invisibles.

== Publication history ==
The series ran for six issues dated November 2008 to April 2009.

== Characters ==
The main character team are The Mates. While there are parallels with The Beatles and each character is a pastiche of a superhero, Tischman insisted the concept was much broader than that: "The persona of the Mates is an iconic one for both superhero teams and rock bands. You are always going to have the really cute one. You are going to have the quiet one. You are going to have the spiritual one and you are going to have the goofy one. That's the case from every group from Justice League to 'N Sync".

- Solicitor is the Batman of the team who has no actual superpowers but is an excellent martial artist.
- Crusader is the team's Superman-equivalent although, while strong and invulnerable, he lacks the power of flight. He is the result of a WWII super soldier program his father took part in, which failed but the powers appeared in his only son.
- Vizier, Dr. Fate who, as a druid, has mystical powers that are drawn from the Earth.
- Golem takes the Hulk role in the Mates and is Vizier's older brother. He leaves the team to be replaced by Zipper, and is the Pete Best figure of the group.
- Zipper, the Flash-style speedster of the group and the only actual mutant.

== Plot ==
The story is told through Come Together, a Behind the Music-like documentary looking back on the team directed by Nick Mansfield, the son of one of The Mates. It then relates the history of the fictional universe through the decades, each one bringing their own types of superhero.

== Reception ==
Martijn Form reviewed the first issue for Comics Bulletin and was not impressed with the story, also finding the dialogue "mediocre" and the plotting "forced". In contrast, Kris Bather at Broken Frontier felt that, while there was a lot going on, it still works well, with hints of Warren Ellis's superhero work (in particular his series No Hero) and the art worked well with parallels to Steve Dillon's work. Comic Book Resources' Timothy Callahan was somewhere in between. He liked Fabry's cleaner line work suggesting "he's just about the perfect guy for this particular job" and while he didn't struggle as much with the plot jumping about in time he felt the part in the present was not as engaging or interesting as The Mates during the Sixties, although even this fell into a predictable pattern: "Okay, it's the Beatles as superheroes, but then what?".

Troy Stith at Comics Bulletin was positive about all aspects of the second issue. Fabry's art has "perfect feel for the story" and Tishman's dialogue "continues to capture the era and feeling of the situation". He concluded: "I can only hope the art and storyline continue to carry on the way they have thus far".
