= American Century (comics) =

Comic

- Cover for American Century #1, art by Howard Chaykin.

Publication information
- Publisher: Vertigo
- Schedule: Monthly
- Format: Ongoing series
- Genre: Crime
- Publication date: May 2001 – October 2003
- No. of issues: 27
- Main character(s): Harry Block

Creative team
- Created by: Howard Chaykin; David Tischman
- Written by: Howard Chaykin; David Tischman
- Penciller(s): Marc Laming; Luke Ross; Lan Medina
- Inker(s): John Stokes; Digital Chameleon
- Letterer(s): Ken Bruzenak; Digital Chameleon; John Costanza
- Colorist(s): Pamela Rambo; Sherilyn Van Valkenburgh
- Editor(s): Shelly Bond; Assistant editors: Will Dennis; Mariah Huehner

Collected editions
- Scars & Stripes: ISBN 978-1563897917
- Hollywood Babylon: ISBN 978-1563898853

American Century is a comic book series published by DC Comics as a part of the Vertigo imprint starting in early 2001. It was co-written by Howard Chaykin and David Tischman.

The story concerned a former American pilot who fakes his death and goes on the run in the 1950s. Chaykin intended it as a "left-wing version of Steve Canyon", and wrote all of the issues. The comic ran for 27 issues until 2003.

== Plot ==
Harry Block, a World War II veteran, fakes his own death and makes his way to Central America to create a new identity for himself as Harry Kraft, a hard-drinking smuggler. During a war in Guatemala, a CIA operative blackmails Block into assassinating Rosa de Santiis, a popular leader in opposition to the CIA puppet dictator General Zavala. Afterward, he heads back to the United States, taking a road trip from Hollywood to Chicago to New York, exploring myriad avenues of 1950s American culture.

The comic ends with Block essentially turning into the character he had created for the fictional "Starburst Comics", a vigilante known as "Dr. Dream".

== Collected editions ==
Some of the series has been collected into two trade paperbacks:

- Scars & Stripes (collects issues #1–4, DC/Vertigo, 2001, ISBN 1-56389-791-1)
- Hollywood Babylon (collects issues #5–9, DC/Vertigo, 2002, ISBN 1-56389-885-3)
