= Finals (comics) =

- Front cover of Finals #1

Publication information
- Publisher: Vertigo
- Schedule: Monthly
- Format: Limited series
- Publication date: September–December 1999
- No. of issues: 4
- Main character(s): Wally Maurer; Nancy Bierce; Dave Oswald; Tim Pike; Gary Skelton

Creative team
- Created by: Will Pfeifer; Jill Thompson
- Written by: Will Pfeifer
- Artist(s): Jill Thompson

Finals is a four-issue mini-series published by DC under its Vertigo imprint from September to December 1999. Written by Will Pfeifer and illustrated by Jill Thompson, it is a black comedy about campus life at Knox State University, aka KAOS U, where the maxim "Strength Through Study" is taken very much to heart.

== Plot synopsis ==
Various college students try to survive the 'finals' period literally. Common incidents at the learning institution include murders, world-changing wars and various cults.

== Characters ==
- Wally Maurer - a film studies major, Wally is something of a slacker, struggling to find inspiration for his "extreme cinema verite" senior project.
- Nancy Bierce - a comparative religions major, Nancy is Wally's girlfriend. She's set up her own cult as her senior thesis but is starting to feel the pressure of having dozens of girls looking to her for divine guidance.
- Dave Oswald - a criminal justice major, Dave has been on a one-man crime wave, robbing local convenience stores as "homework". His new girlfriend Collette is a member of Nancy's cult.
- Tim Pike - a theoretical engineering major, Tim is attempted to live up to his family's high standards by developing a time travel machine. He becomes cynical after witnessing his future self come through the machine only to be shot and killed.
- Gary Skelton - an anthropology major, Gary is attempting to de-evolve (a scientific and logical impossibility) for his thesis. He's prepared to do anything to climb down the evolutionary ladder, even undergo physical change.
- Michael Woolrich - the only member of the faculty to survive the detonation of homemade nuclear bomb in 1949, he is now college president and rules with an iron fist.
- Riley - the head of campus security, Riley is Woolrich's right-hand man and responsible for all of the president's dirty work.
- Collette - a junior, Collette is a member of Nancy's cult who starts's dating Dave.
- Randy is a senior who is going to ace his final year by orchestrating a war in the Middle East.
