= David Tischman =

American comic book writer

- Area: Writer
- Notable works: American Century; Cable; Bite Club; Star Trek

David Tischman is an American comic book writer who has been active since 2000, writing for such series as American Century, Cable, Bite Club, and Star Trek, as well as the web comic Heroine Chic.

== Biography ==
Tischman wrote Greatest Hits at Vertigo.

Among his credits are the mini-series Luke McBain, from 12-Gauge Comics; Red Herring for Wildstorm, with artist Philip Bond; and Angel: Barbary Coast for IDW. From 2015 to 2017, he wrote the web comic Heroine Chic, with art by Audrey Mok.

== Bibliography ==
Comics work includes:

- American Century (with co-author Howard Chaykin, Vertigo, May 2001 – October 2003) collected as:
  - Scars & Stripes (collects American Century #1-4, 2001, ISBN 1-56389-791-1)
  - Hollywood Babylon (collects American Century #5-9, 2002, ISBN 1-56389-885-3)
- Angel and the Ape (with co-author Howard Chaykin and art by Philip Bond, 4-issue mini-series, Vertigo, October 2001 - January 2002)
- Greatest Hits (with artist Glenn Fabry, 6-issue limited series, Vertigo, 2008–2009)
- Red Herring (with art by Philip Bond, 6-issue limited series, Wildstorm, October 2009 - March 2010, tpb, August 2010, 144 pages, ISBN 1-4012-2762-7)
