= Simon Oliver =

British-American comic book writer

- Born: United Kingdom
- Area: Writer
- Notable works: The Exterminators

Simon Oliver is a British-American comic book writer, best known for his creator-owned series The Exterminators and FBP: Federal Bureau of Physics, published under DC Comics' Vertigo imprint.

== Career ==
Simon Oliver was born in the United Kingdom but left the country in the early 90s. After traveling around the world for several years, he settled in Los Angeles, working in the film industry, mostly as a camera assistant on TV shows such as Once and Again and Joan of Arcadia. Oliver began writing The Exterminators as a potential TV series but, after his early scripts were passed to Karen Berger, the Editor-in-Chief of DC Comics' Vertigo imprint, Oliver received an offer from the publisher to turn the series into a comic book. The Exterminators began publishing as an ongoing monthly series in January 2006. The following year, Oliver became the writer of the Wildstorm ongoing series Gen^{13} and penned Hellblazer Presents: Chas – The Knowledge, a spin-off mini-series published as part of the Hellblazer 20th anniversary.

In 2013, Vertigo began publishing Oliver's second creator-owned series, Collider. The series' title was changed to FBP: Federal Bureau of Physics following legal action from an international comics publisher.

== Bibliography ==
To date, the entirety of Oliver's work has been published by DC Comics and its various imprints:

- The Exterminators (with Tony Moore, Chris Samnee (#8), Mike Hawthorne (#11–12), John Lucas (#15–16, 27), Ty Templeton (#17–18, 26), Darick Robertson (#19–23), Vertigo, 2006–2008) collected as:
  - Bug Brothers (collects #1–5, tpb, 128 pages, 2006, ISBN 1-4012-1064-3)
  - Insurgency (collects #6–10, tpb, 128 pages, 2007, ISBN 1-4012-1221-2)
  - Lies of Our Fathers (collects #11–16, tpb, 144 pages, 2007, ISBN 1-4012-1475-4)
  - Crossfire and Collateral (collects #17–23, tpb, 168 pages, 2008, ISBN 1-4012-1685-4)
  - Bug Brothers Forever (collects #24–30, tpb, 168 pages, 2008, ISBN 1-4012-1970-5)
- Gen^{13} vol. 4 #14–20 (with Carlo Barberi, Sunny Lee (#16) and Wes Craig (#20), Wildstorm, 2008) collected as Gen^{13}: 15 Minutes (tpb, 160 pages, 2008, ISBN 1-4012-2002-9)
- Hellblazer Presents: Chas – The Knowledge #1–5 (with Goran Sudžuka, Vertigo, 2008–2009) collected as Chas: The Knowledge (tpb, 128 pages, 2009, ISBN 1-4012-2127-0)
- Vertigo Crime: Noche Roja (with Jason Latour, graphic novel, hc, 184 pages, 2011, ISBN 1-4012-1535-1; sc, 2011, ISBN 1-4012-3062-8)
- FBP: Federal Bureau of Physics (with Robbi Rodriguez (#1–13) and Alberto Ponticelli (#14–24), Vertigo, 2013–2015) collected as:
  - The Paradigm Shift (collects #1–7, tpb, 160 pages, 2014, ISBN 1-4012-4510-2)
  - Wish You Were Here (collects #8–13, tpb, 144 pages, 2014, ISBN 1-4012-5067-X)
  - Audeamus (collects #14–19, tpb, 144 pages, 2015, ISBN 1-4012-5434-9)
  - The End Times (collects #20–24, tpb, 128 pages, 2016, ISBN 1-4012-5845-X)
- Convergence: Plastic Man and the Freedom Fighters #1–2 (with John McCrea, 2015) collected in Convergence: Infinite Earths Book Two (tpb, 272 pages, 2015, ISBN 1-4012-5838-7)
- Last Gang in Town #1–6 (with Rufus Dayglo, Vertigo, 2016) collected as Last Gang in Town (tpb, 160 pages, 2016, ISBN 1-4012-6473-5)
- The Hellblazer (with Moritat, Pia Guerra (#5–6), Philip Tan (#7–8) and Davidé Fabbri, 2016–2017) collected as:
  - The Poison Truth (collects the Rebirth one-shot and #1–6, tpb, 168 pages, 2017, ISBN 1-40126-886-2)
  - The Smokeless Fire (collects #7–12, tpb, 144 pages, 2017, ISBN 1-4012-7389-0)

Preceded by Gail Simone	Gen^{13} writer 2008	Succeeded by Scott Beatty
Preceded by Ming Doyle; James Tynion IV (Constantine: The Hellblazer)	The Hellblazer writer 2016–2017	Succeeded by Tim Seeley
