= Bite Club (comics) =

- Cover to issue #1 of Bite Club (June 2004), art by Frank Quitely.

Publication information
- Publisher: Vertigo
- Schedule: Monthly
- Format: Limited series
- Publication date: Bite Club: June–November 2004; Bite Club: Vampire Crime Unit: June–September 2006
- No. of issues: Bite Club: 6 Bite Club: Vampire Crime Unit: 5

Creative team
- Created by: Howard Chaykin; David Tischman
- Written by: Howard Chaykin; David Tischman
- Artist(s): David Hahn
- Letterer(s): Jared K. Fletcher
- Colorist(s): Brian Miller
- Editor(s): Karen Berger; Tony R. Rose

Collected editions
- The Complete Bite Club: ISBN 1-4012-1272-7

Bite Club is a Vertigo comic book mini series created by writers Howard Chaykin and David Tischman. It is a crime story in which the protagonists are vampires living in Miami, Florida, United States. Chaykin has said the comic was a metaphor for racial profiling and the immigrant experience.

== Plot ==
After the murder of vampire crime boss Eduardo del Toro, his heirs and relatives begin to make a play for control of his organization. To their dismay, Toro in his will named his youngest son, a Roman Catholic priest and vampire named Leto, as his successor. Leto announces that his family will get out of the illegal-drug business and begin investing in legitimate industry. This endeavor earns Leto the support of Zephraim Klein, the Del Toro family consigliere, and the enmity of his other relatives, like his siblings Eddie and Risa, and his cousin Victor. Risa later assassinates Eddie. Risa then teams up with Victor to assassinate Leto, and is successful, although Victor also dies during the attempt, and Risa takes control of the family with her girlfriend Carrie.

Risa soon finds that running the Del Toro family is not as fulfilling as she had expected. Their legitimate businesses are the subject of myriad lawsuits, and Risa herself is being investigated by the police as the suspect in a string of murders. Homicide detective Paco Macavoy develops an obsession with Risa. He confirms that Risa is innocent of the murders, and also that the Vampire Crime Unit is riddled with corruption. After discovering that it was Risa's girlfriend Carrie who did the killings, Macavoy is himself turned into a vampire. Sick of the entire affair, he abandons both the Del Toro family and his job on the police department.

== Collected editions ==
The two series have been collected as a trade paperback:

- The Complete Bite Club (collects Bite Club #1-6, and Bite Club: Vampire Crime Unit #1-5, 272 pages, August 2007, ISBN 1-4012-1272-7)
