= List of DC Comics imprint publications =

DC Comics is one of the largest comic book and graphic novel publishers in North America. DC has published comic books under a number of different imprints and corporate names. This page lists ongoing series, limited series, one-shots and graphic novels published under the imprints All-Star, ABC, CMX, DC Focus, Helix, Homage, Impact, Johnny DC, Milestone, Minx, Paradox Press, Piranha Press, Tangent, Vertigo, WildStorm, and Young Animal as well as those Amalgam Comics published by DC.

A list of DC Comics published under the DC or AA imprint can be found here.

A list of DC Archive Editions can be found here.

A list of DC Comics trade paperback reprint collections can be found here.

A list of DC Comics imprints reprint collections can be found here.

== Titles under DC ==
=== All-Star ===
The All-Star line intended to reinterpret DC's most recognizable characters in their purest, iconic forms. All Star Batgirl and All Star Wonder Woman were announced but never released.

Title	Issues	Cover dates	Notes
All Star Batman & Robin, the Boy Wonder	#1 – 10	September 2005 – August 2008	Published irregularly.
All-Star Superman	#1 – 12	January 2006 – October 2008	Published irregularly.

=== Amalgam ===
Amalgam Comics was a title shared by DC and Marvel Comics for a Fifth-week event. The following were the titles published by DC, while others were published by Marvel.

Title	Issues	Cover dates	Notes
Amazon	#1	April 1996	
Assassins	#1	April 1996	
Bat-Thing	#1	June 1997	
Dark Claw Adventures	#1	June 1997	
Doctor Strangefate	#1	April 1996	
Generation Hex	#1	June 1997	
JLX	#1	April 1996	
JLX Unleashed	#1	June 1997	
Legends of the Dark Claw	#1	April 1996	
Lobo the Duck	#1	June 1997	
Super Soldier	#1	April 1996	
Super Soldier: Man of War	#1	June 1997	

=== DC Focus ===
DC Focus was a short-lived imprint featuring people with super powers who did not necessarily become heroes.

Title	Issues	Cover dates	Notes
Fraction	#1 – 6	June 2004 – November 2004	
Hard Time	#1 – 12	April 2004 – March 2005	Season Two published by DC Comics.
Kinetic	#1 – 8	May 2004 – December 2004	
Touch	#1 – 6	June 2004 – November 2004	

=== Johnny DC ===
Johnny DC was a DC Comics imprint for a younger audience, who published animated series and Cartoon Network related material.

Title	Issues	Cover dates	Notes
All-New Batman: The Brave and the Bold	#1 - 16	January 2011 - April 2012	Continuation of Batman: The Brave and the Bold.
Batman: The Brave and the Bold	#1 – 22	March 2009 – December 2010	Based on the 2008 animated series Batman: The Brave and the Bold.
The Batman Strikes!	#1 – 50	November 2004 – December 2008	Based on the 2004 animated series The Batman.
Billy Batson and the Magic of SHAZAM!	#1 – 21	September 2008 – December 2010	
Cartoon Cartoons	#1 – 29	March 2001 – October 2004	
Cartoon Network Action Pack	#1 – 67	July 2006 – May 2012	
Cartoon Network Block Party	#1 – 59	November 2004 – September 2009	
Cartoon Network Presents	#1 – 24	August 1997 – August 1999	
Cartoon Network Starring	#1 – 18	September 1999 – February 2001	
DC Kids Mega Sampler	#1	June 2009	One-shot
DC Super Friends	#1 - 29	May 2008 - September 2010	Based on the Imaginext toy line of the same name.
Gotham Girls	#1 - 5	October 2002 - February 2003	Tie-in for the Gotham Girls webseries.
Green Lantern: The Animated Series	#1 - 14	January 2012 - September 2013	Based on the 2011 animated series Green Lantern: The Animated Series.
Hi Hi Puffy Amiyumi	#1 – 3	April 2006 – June 2006	Limited series. Based on the 2004 animated series Hi Hi Puffy AmiYumi.
Justice League Adventures	#1 - 34	January 2002 - October 2004	Based on the 2001 animated series Justice League.
Justice League Unlimited	#1 – 46	November 2004 – August 2008	Based on the 2004 animated series Justice League Unlimited.
Krypto the Super Dog	#1– 6	November 2006 – April 2007	Limited series. Based on the 2005 animated series Krypto the Superdog.
Legion of Super Heroes in the 31st Century	#1 – 20	June 2007 – January 2009	Based on the 2006 animated series Legion of Super Heroes.
Looney Tunes	#118 – 158	November 2004 – March 2008	Issues #1–117 and from #159 onwards published by DC.
The Powerpuff Girls	#1 – 70	March 2000 – March 2006	Did not publish in July 2002. Based on the 1998 animated series The Powerpuff Girls.
The Powerpuff Girls Double Whammy	#1	December 2000	One-shot reprint of The Powerpuff Girls #1 and #2 in one issue.
The Powerpuff Girls Movie	#1	July 2002	One-shot adaptation of the film.
Princess Natasha	#1 – 4	August 2006 – November 2006	Based on the 2003 flash cartoon Princess Natasha.
Scooby-Doo	#88 – 128	November 2004 – March 2008	Issues #1–87 and from #129 onwards published by DC.
Scooby-Doo: Where Are You?	#1 – ongoing	November 2010 – present	
Supergirl: Cosmic Adventures in the 8th Grade	#1 – 6	February – July 2009	
Superman Family Adventures	#1 - 12	July 2012 - June 2013	
Teen Titans Go!	#11 – 51	November 2004 – March 2008	Issues #1–87 and from #129 onwards published by DC. Based on the 2003 animated series Teen Titans.
Teen Titans: Jam Packed Action	#1	2005	
Tiny Titans	#1 – 50	April 2008 – May 2010	
Tiny Titans/Little Archie	#1 – 3	December 2010 – February 2011	
Young Justice	0 - 25	January 2011 - April 2013	Based on the 2011 animated series Young Justice. Issues #0 to #19 were set between episodes of season 1, while the final 6-issue arc was set a month before the start of season 2.

=== Tangent ===
Tangent Comics was a title used for two Fifth-week events.

Title	Issues	Cover dates	Notes
The Atom	#1	February 1997	
The Batman	#1	September 1998	
Doom Patrol	#1	February 1997	
Flash	#1	December 1997	
Green Lantern	#1	February 1997	
JLA	#1	September 1998	
The Joker	#1	February 1997	
The Joker's Wild!	#1	September 1998	
Metal Men	#1	February 1997	
Nightwing	#1	February 1997	
Nightwing: Night Force	#1	September 1998	
Powergirl	#1	September 1998	
Sea Devils	#1	December 1997	
Secret Six	#1	December 1997	
The Superman	#1	September 1998	
Tales of the Green Lantern	#1	September 1998	
The Trials of the Flash	#1	September 1998	
Wonder Woman	#1	September 1998	

== CMX ==
CMX was a DC Comics imprint that reprinted manga.

Title	Issues	Cover dates	Notes
Emma	#1 – 5	October 2006 – November 2007	

== Helix ==
Helix was short-lived science fiction imprint for mature readers. It was ultimately folded into Vertigo.

Title	Issues	Cover dates	Notes
The Black Lamb	#1 – 6	November 1996 – April 1997	
Bloody Mary	#1 – 4	October 1996 – January 1997	
Bloody Mary: Lady Liberty	#1 – 4	September 1997 – December 1997	
BrainBanx	#1 – 6	March 1997 – August 1997	
Cyberella	#1 – 12	September 1996 – August 1997	
Dead Corps	#1 – 4	September 1998 – December 1998	
The Dome: Ground Zero	#1	1998	
Gemini Blood	#1 – 9	September 1996 – May 1997	
Michael Moorcock's Multiverse	#1 – 12	November 1997 – October 1998	
Sheva's War	#1 – 5	October 1998 – February 1999	
Star Crossed	#1 – 3	June – August 1997	
Time Breakers	#1 – 5	January – May 1997	
Transmetropolitan	#1 – 12	September 1997 – August 1998	Moved to Vertigo
Vermillion	#1 – 12	October 1996 – September 1997	

== Impact ==
Impact Comics printed superhero comics licensed from Archie Comics.

Title	Issues	Cover dates	Notes
The Black Hood	#1 – 12	December 1991 – December 1992	
The Black Hood	Annual #1	1992	
The Comet	#1 – 18	July 1991 – December 1992	
The Comet	Annual #1	1992	
Crucible	#1 – 6	February – July 1993	
The Crusaders	#1 – 8	May – December 1992	
The Fly	#1 – 17	August 1991 – December 1992	
The Fly	Annual #1	1992	
Impact Christmas Special	#1	1991	
Impact Comics Who's Who	#1 – 3	September 1991 – May 1992	
The Jaguar	#1 – 14	August 1991 – October 1992	
The Jaguar	Annual #1	1992	
The Legend of the Shield	#1 – 16	July 1991 – October 1992	
The Legend of the Shield	Annual #1	1992	
The Web	#1 – 14	September 1991 – October 1992	
The Web	Annual #1	1992	

== Milestone Media ==
Milestone Media was a creator-owned imprint licensed to DC. In 2008, Milestone Media characters became part of the DC Universe.

Title	Issues	Cover dates	Notes
Blood Syndicate	#1 – 35	April 1993 – February 1996	
Deathwish	#1 – 4	December 1994 – March 1995	
Hardware	#1 – 50	April 1993 – April 1997	
Heroes	#1 – 6	May – November 1996	
Icon	#1 – 42	May 1993 – February 1997	
Kobalt	#1 – 16	June 1994 – September 1995	
Long Hot Summer	#1 – 3	July – September 1995	
My Name is Holocaust	#1 – 5	May – September 1995	
Shadow Cabinet	#0 – 17	January 1994 – October 1995	
Static	#1 – 47	June 1993 – May 1997	
Static Shock: Rebirth of the Cool	#1 – 4	January – April 2001	
Wise Son: The White Wolf	#1 – 4	November 1996 – February 1997	
Worlds Collide	#1	July 1994	
Xombi	#0 – 21	January 1994 – February 1996	

== Minx ==
Title	Issues	Cover dates	Notes
Burnout	One-shot graphic novel	April 2008	
Confessions of a Blabbermouth	One-shot	September 2007	
Kimmie66	One-shot graphic novel	October 2007	
Waterbaby	One-shot graphic novel	April 2008	

== Paradox Press ==
Title	Issues	Cover dates	Notes
100% True	#1 – 2	Summer 1996 – Winter 1997	Published quarterly
Brooklyn Dreams	#1 – 4	December 1994 – March 1995	
Family Man	#1 – 3	January – May 1995	
Hunter's Heart	#1 – 3	June – August 1995	
La Pacifica	#1 – 3	December 1994 – February 1995	
The Remarkable Worlds of Professor Phineas B. Fuddle	#1 – 4	July – October 2000	
Weird	#1 – 4	Summer 1997 – Spring 1999	

== Piranha Press ==
Published from 1989 to 1993, Piranha Press was DC's alternative comics line.

Title	Issues	Cover dates	Notes
Beautiful Stories for Ugly Children	#1 – 30	June 1989 – November 1991	One graphic novel followed the regular series. One trade paperback reprinting the first and thirteenth issues, as well as a new story, was published in 1990.
The Elvis Mandible	#1	1990	
Fast Forward	#1 – 3	October 1992 – January 1993	
Invaders from Home	#1 – 6	1990	
Nation of Snitches		September 1990	One-shot
Prince and the New Power Generation: Three Chains of Gold		1994	One-shot
The Score	#1 – 4	July – October 1989	
The Sinners		1989	One-shot
Why I Hate Saturn		1990	One-shot
