= List of DC Comics publications (A–B) =

DC Comics is one of the largest comic book publishers in North America. DC has published comic books under a number of different imprints and corporate names. This is a list of all series, mini-series, limited series, one-shots and graphic novels published under the imprints DC or AA, and published by National Periodical Publications, National Comics Publications, All-American Comics, Inc., National Allied Publications, Detective Comics, Inc., and related corporate names, as well as imprints publishing titles directly related to the DC Universe characters and continuity, such as Elseworlds and DC Black Label. The list does not include collected editions; trade paperbacks; digital comics; free, promotional giveaways; or magazines, nor does it include series from imprints mainly publishing titles that are separate from the DC Universe continuity, such as Vertigo or WildStorm; series published under those imprints that are related to the DC Universe continuity are noted, but not listed.

While generally the most recognizable name of a comic is printed on the cover, the cover title can be changed for a number of reasons. For example, Action Comics has frequently been listed as Action Comics featuring Superman or Superman in Action Comics, or even on occasion Supergirl in Action Comics. The official name, however, is found in the indicia, in small print inside the comics.

- List of DC Comics publications (C–F)
- List of DC Comics publications (G–J)
- List of DC Comics publications (K–O)
- List of DC Comics publications (P–S)
- List of DC Comics publications (T–Z)

== 0–9 ==
Title	Series	Issues	Dates	Notes	Reference
1st Issue Special		#1–13	Apr 1975 – Apr 1976		
3-D Batman		2 issues	1953; 1966	One-shot; 1966 issue is a reprint of the 1953 issue	
9-11: September 11, 2001		#1–2	Jan 2002 – Feb 2002	Limited series; co-published with Dark Horse Comics	
52		#1–52	May 2006 – May 2007	Weekly limited series	
52 Aftermath: The Four Horsemen		#1–6	Oct 2007 – Mar 2008	Limited series	
80-Page Giant Magazine		#1–15	Aug 1964 – Oct 1965	Series continued (#G16–G89) as giant-sized "dual-numbered" editions of existing titles	

== A ==
Title	Series	Issues	Dates	Notes	Reference
A. Bizarro		#1–4	Jul 1999 – Oct 1999	Limited series	
Absolute Batman		#1–	Dec 2024 – present		
Absolute Batman		2025 Annual #1	2025		
Absolute Batman		Ark M Special #1	Mar 2026		
Absolute Cassandra Cain: The Shadow's Hand		#1	Nov 2026	One-shot	
Absolute Catwoman		#1–12	Aug 2026 – present	Limited series	
Absolute Evil		#1	Dec 2025	One-shot	
Absolute Flash		#1–	May 2025 – present		
Absolute Green Arrow		#1–6	Jul 2026 – Dec 2026	Limited series	
Absolute Green Lantern		#1–	Jun 2025 – present		
Absolute Martian Manhunter		#1–12	May 2025 – Sep 2026	Limited series	
Absolute Power		#1–4	Sep 2024 – Dec 2024	Limited series	
Absolute Power	Ground Zero	#1	Aug 2024	One-shot	
Absolute Power	Origins	#1–3	Sep 2024 – Nov 2024	Limited series	
Absolute Power	Super Son	#1	Nov 2024	One-shot	
Absolute Power	Task Force VII	#1–7	Sep 2024 – Nov 2024	Limited series	
Absolute Superman		#1–	Jan 2025 – present		
Absolute Wonder Woman		#1–	Dec 2024 – present		
Absolute Wonder Woman		2026 Annual #1	2026		
Action Comics	vol. 1	#1–904	Jun 1938 – Oct 2011	Issues #601–642 are titled Action Comics Weekly; see also Action Comics #1	
Action Comics	vol. 1	#0	Oct 1994	Zero Hour tie-in	
Action Comics	vol. 1	#1,000,000	Nov 1998	DC One Million tie-in	
Action Comics	vol. 1	Annual #1–13	1987 – 1997; 2007 – 2009; 2011		
Action Comics	vol. 2	#0–52	Nov 2011 – Jul 2016	Issue #0 was published between #12 and #13	
Action Comics	vol. 2	#23.1–23.4	Nov 2013	Forever Evil tie-ins	
Action Comics	vol. 2	Annual #1–3	2012 – 2014		
Action Comics	vol. 2	Futures End #1	Nov 2014		
Action Comics	vol. 3	#957–	Aug 2016 – present	Rebirth. Return to original numbering	
Action Comics	vol. 3	2021 – 2023 Annual	2021 – 2023		
Action Comics	vol. 3	Special #1	Jul 2018		
Action Comics Presents: Doomsday Special		#1	Oct 2023	One-shot	
Adam Strange	vol. 1	#1–3	May 1990 – Jul 1990	Limited series	
Adam Strange	vol. 2	#1–8	Nov 2004 – Jun 2005	Limited series	
Adam Strange/Future Quest Special		#1	May 2017	One-shot	
Adam Strange Special		#1	Nov 2008	One-shot	
Advanced Dungeons and Dragons		#1–36	Dec 1988 – Dec 1991		
Advanced Dungeons and Dragons		Annual #1	1990		
Adventure Comics	vol. 1	#32–503	Nov 1938 – Sep 1983	Formerly New Adventure Comics; issues #491–503 are digest-sized	
Adventure Comics	vol. 2	#1	May 1999	One-shot; part of The Justice Society Returns! series	
Adventure Comics	vol. 3	#0–12 #516–529	Apr 2009 – Oct 2011	Issues #1–12 are dual-numbered #504–515	
Adventure Comics 80-Page Giant		#1	Oct 1998	One-shot	
Adventure Comics Special Featuring the Guardian		#1	Jan 2009	One-shot	
Adventures in the DC Universe		#1–19	Apr 1997 – Oct 1998		
Adventures in the DC Universe		Annual #1	Nov 1997		
The Adventures of Alan Ladd		#1–9	Oct/Nov 1949 – Feb/Mar 1951		
The Adventures of Bob Hope		#1–109	Feb/Mar 1949 – Feb/Mar 1968		
The Adventures of Dean Martin and Jerry Lewis		#1–40	Jul/Aug 1952 – Oct 1957	Becomes The Adventures of Jerry Lewis	
The Adventures of Ford Fairlane		#1–4	May 1990 – Aug 1990	Limited series; movie adaptation	
The Adventures of Jerry Lewis		#41–124	Nov 1957 – May/Jun 1971	Formerly The Adventures of Dean Martin and Jerry Lewis	
The Adventures of Ozzie and Harriet		#1–5	Oct/Nov 1949 – Jun/Jul 1950	Based on the radio series	
The Adventures of Rex the Wonder Dog		#1–46	Jan/Feb 1952 – Nov/Dec 1959		
The Adventures of Superboy		#18–22	Jul 1991 – Feb 1992	Formerly Superboy vol. 2. Based on the TV series	
The Adventures of Superboy		Special #1	1992	Formerly Superboy vol. 2. Based on the TV series	
Adventures of Supergirl		#1–6	Jul 2016 – Sep 2016	Based on the TV series	
Adventures of Superman	vol. 1	#424–649	Jan 1987 – Apr 2006	Formerly Superman; becomes Superman vol. 3	
Adventures of Superman	vol. 1	#0	Oct 1994	Zero Hour tie-in	
Adventures of Superman	vol. 1	#1,000,000	Nov 1998	DC One Million tie-in	
Adventures of Superman	vol. 1	Annual #1–9	1987 – 1997		
Adventures of Superman	vol. 2	#1–17	Jul 2013 – Nov 2014		
Adventures of Superman: Book of El		#1–12	Nov 2025 – Nov 2026	Limited series	
Adventures of Superman: Jon Kent		#1–6	May 2023 – Oct 2023	Limited series	
Adventures of the Outsiders		#33–46	May 1986 – Jun 1987	Formerly Batman and the Outsiders	
Adventures of the Super Sons		#1–12	Oct 2018 – Sep 2019	Limited series	
Agent Liberty Special		#1	Jan 1992	One-shot	
Alan Scott: The Green Lantern		#1–6	Dec 2023 – Jul 2024	Limited series	
Alien Nation		#1	Dec 1988	One shot movie adaptation	
All-American Comics	vol. 1	#1–102	Apr 1939 – Oct 1948	Becomes All-American Western	
All-American Comics	vol. 2	#1	May 1999	One-shot; part of The Justice Society Returns! series	
All-American Men of War	vol. 1	#127–128	Aug/Sep 1952 – Oct/Nov 1952	Formerly All-American Western	
All-American Men of War	vol. 2	#2–117	Dec 1952/Jan 1953 – Sep/Oct 1956	No first issue	
All-American Western		#103–126	Nov 1948 – Jun/Jul 1952	Formerly All-American Comics; becomes All-American Men of War	
All-Flash	vol. 1	#1–32	Summer 1941 – Dec/Jan 1947/1948	Issues #1-5 are titled All-Flash Quarterly	
All-Flash	vol. 2	#1	Sep 2007	One-shot; leads into Flash vol. 2 #231	
All Funny Comics		#1–23	Winter 1943/1944 – May/Jun 1948		
The All-New Atom		#1–25	Sep 2006 – Sep 2008		
The All-New Batman: The Brave and the Bold		#1–16	Jan 2011 – Apr 2012	Based on the television series Batman: The Brave and the Bold; issues #14–16 titled Batman: The Brave and the Bold	
All-New Collectors' Edition		#C-53–C-58, #C-60–C-62	Jan 1978 – Mar 1979	Numbering continued from Limited Collectors' Edition; each issue is tabloid-sized	
All-Out War		#1–6	Sep/Oct 1979 – Aug 1980		
All Star Batman		#1–14	Oct 2016 – Dec 2017		
All Star Batman and Robin the Boy Wonder		#1–10	Sep 2005 – Aug 2008		
All-Star Comics	vol. 1	#1–57	Summer 1940 – Feb/Mar 1951	Becomes All-Star Western at #58	
All-Star Comics	vol. 1	#58–74	Jan/Feb 1976 – Sep/Oct 1978	Numbering revived in the late 1970s	
All-Star Comics	vol. 2	#1–2	May 1999	Limited series; part of The Justice Society Returns! series	
All-Star Comics 80-Page Giant		#1	Sep 1999	One-shot	
All-Star Section Eight		#1–6	Aug 2015 – Feb 2016	Limited series	
All-Star Squadron		#1–67	Sep 1981 – Mar 1987		
All-Star Squadron		Annual #1–3	1982 – 1984		
All-Star Superman		#1–12	Jan 2006 – Oct 2008	Limited series	
All-Star Western	vol. 1	#58–119	Apr/May 1951 – Jun/Jul 1961	Formerly All Star Comics	
All-Star Western	vol. 2	#1–11	Aug/Sep 1970 – Apr/May 1972	Becomes Weird Western Tales	
All-Star Western	vol. 3	#0–34	Sep 2011 – Aug 2014	Issue #0 was published between #12 and #13	
All Access		#1–4	Oct 1996 – Dec 1997	Limited series; co-published with Marvel	
Alpha Centurion Special		#1	1996	One-shot	
Amazing Adventures of the JLA		#1	2006	One-shot	
Amazing World of DC Comics		#1–17	Aug 1974 – Apr 1978		
Amazon		#1	Apr 1996	One-shot; published under the Amalgam Comics imprint in association with Marvel	
Amazons Attack	vol. 1	#1–6	Jun 2007 – Oct 2007	Limited series	
Amazons Attack	vol. 2	#1–6	Dec 2023 – May 2024		
Ambush Bug		#1–4	Jun 1985 – Sep 1985	Limited series	
Ambush Bug: Nothing Special		#1	Sep 1992	One-shot	
Ambush Bug Stocking Stuffer		#1	Feb 1986	One-shot	
Ambush Bug: Year None		#1–5, 7	Jul 2008 – Oct 2009	Limited series; issue #6 was not published	
Ame-Comi Girls	vol. 1	#1–5	Dec 2012 – Apr 2013	Limited series	
Ame-Comi Girls	vol. 2	#1–8	May 2013 – Dec 2013		
America vs. the Justice Society		#1–4	Jan 1985 – Apr 1985	Limited series	
American Vampire 1976		#1–10	Dec 2020 – Oct 2021	Limited series; published under the DC Black Label imprint; previous volumes published under the Vertigo imprint	
Amethyst	vol. 1	#1–16	Jan 1985 – Aug 1986		
Amethyst	vol. 1	Special #1	Oct 1986		
Amethyst	vol. 2	#1–4	Nov 1987 – Feb 1988	Limited series	
Amethyst	vol. 3	#1–6	Apr 2020 – Feb 2021	Limited series; published under the Wonder Comics pop-up imprint	
Amethyst, Princess of Gemworld	vol. 1	#1–12	May 1983 – Apr 1984		
Amethyst, Princess of Gemworld	vol. 1	Annual #1	Sep 1984		
Amethyst, Princess of Gemworld	vol. 2		2021	Graphic novel; titled Amethyst: Princess of Gemworld	
Anarky	vol. 1	#1–4	May 1997 – Aug 1997	Limited series	
Anarky	vol. 2	#1–8	May 1999 – Dec 1999		
Angel and the Ape	vol. 1	#1–6	Nov/Dec 1968 – Sep/Oct 1969	Becomes Meet Angel	
Angel and the Ape	vol. 2	#1–4	Mar 1991 – Jun 1991	Limited series; see also Vertigo list	
Angel Love		#1–8	Aug 1986 – Mar 1987		
Angel Love		Special #1	1987		
Anima		#1–15	Mar 1994 – Jul 1995		
Anima		#0	Oct 1994	Zero Hour tie-in	
Animal Antics		#1–23	Mar/Apr 1946 – Nov/Dec 1949	Becomes Movietown's Animal Antics	
Animal Man	vol. 1	#1–56	Sep 1988 – Feb 1993	Series continued under the Vertigo imprint	
Animal Man	vol. 2	#0–29	Sep 2011 – Mar 2014	Issue #0 was published between #12 and #13	
Animal Man	vol. 2	Annual #1–2	2012 – 2013		
Animaniacs		#1–59	May 1995 – Apr 2000		
Animaniacs: A Christmas Special		#1	1994	One-shot	
Anthro		#1–6	Jul 1968 – Jul 1969		
Anti/Hero			2020	Graphic novel	
Ape-ril Special		#1	May 2024	One-shot	
Aquaman	vol. 1	#1–56	Jan/Feb 1962 – Mar/Apr 1971		
Aquaman	vol. 1	#57–63	Aug/Sep 1977 – Aug/Sep 1978		
Aquaman	vol. 2	#1–4	Feb 1986 – May 1986	Limited series	
Aquaman	vol. 3	#1–5	Jun 1989 – Oct 1989	Limited series	
Aquaman	vol. 4	#1–13	Dec 1991 – Dec 1992		
Aquaman	vol. 5	#1–75	Aug 1994 – Jan 2001		
Aquaman	vol. 5	#0	Oct 1994	Zero Hour tie-in	
Aquaman	vol. 5	#1,000,000	Nov 1998	DC One Million tie-in	
Aquaman	vol. 5	Annual #1–5	1995 – 1999		
Aquaman	vol. 5	Secret Files #1	Dec 1998		
Aquaman	vol. 6	#1–39	Feb 2003 – Apr 2006	Becomes Aquaman: Sword of Atlantis	
Aquaman	vol. 6	Secret Files 2003	May 2003		
Aquaman	vol. 7	#0–52	Nov 2011 – Jul 2016	Issue #0 was published between #12 and #13	
Aquaman	vol. 7	#23.1–23.2	Nov 2013	Forever Evil tie-ins	
Aquaman	vol. 7	Annual #1–2	2013 – 2014		
Aquaman	vol. 7	Futures End #1	Nov 2014		
Aquaman	vol. 8	#1–66	Aug 2016 – Feb 2021		
Aquaman	vol. 8	Annual #1–2	2018 – 2019		
Aquaman	vol. 8	Rebirth #1	Aug 2016		
Aquaman	vol. 9	#1–14	Mar 2025 – Apr 2026	Continued as Emperor Aquaman	
Aquaman 80th Anniversary 100-Page Super Spectacular		#1	Oct 2021	One-shot	
Aquaman & The Flash: Voidsong		#1–3	Aug 2022 – Oct 2022	Limited series	
Aquaman and the Lost Kingdom Special		#1	Dec 2023	One-shot; movie tie-in	
Aquaman and the Others		#1–11	Jun 2014 – May 2015		
Aquaman and the Others		Futures End #1	Nov 2014		
Aquaman: Andromeda		#1–3	Aug 2022 – Dec 2022	Limited series; published under the DC Black Label imprint	
Aquaman/Green Arrow - Deep Target		#1–7	Dec 2021 – Jun 2022	Limited series	
Aquaman/Jabberjaw Special		#1	Jul 2018	One-shot	
Aquaman/Justice League: Drowned Earth Special		#1	Jan 2019	One-shot	
Aquaman Special	vol. 1	#1	1988		
Aquaman Special	vol. 2	#1	1989	Titled Legend of Aquaman on cover	
Aquaman: Sword of Atlantis		#40–57	May 2006 – Dec 2007	Formerly Aquaman vol. 6	
Aquaman: The Becoming		#1–6	Nov 2021 – Apr 2022	Limited series	
Aquaman: Time and Tide		#1–4	Dec 1993 – Mar 1994	Limited series	
Aquamanateam: More Than a Dream			2026	Graphic novel	
Aquamanatee			2025	Graphic novel	
Aquamen		#1–6	Apr 2022 – Sep 2022		
Arak, Son of Thunder		#1–50	Sep 1981 – Nov 1985		
Arak, Son of Thunder		Annual #1	Oct 1984		
Archie Meets Batman '66		#1–6	Sep 2018 – Mar 2019	Limited series; co-published with Archie Comics	
Are You Afraid of Darkseid?		#1	Dec 2021	One-shot	
Argus		#1–6	Apr 1995 – Oct 1995	Limited series	
Arion Lord of Atlantis		#1–35	Nov 1982 – Sep 1985		
Arion Lord of Atlantis		Special #1	Oct 1985		
Arion the Immortal		#1–6	Jul 1992 – Dec 1992	Limited series	
Arkham Asylum			1989	Graphic novel; also known as Arkham Asylum: A Serious House on Serious Earth	
Arkham Asylum: Living Hell		#1–6	Jul 2003 – Dec 2003	Limited series	
Arkham Asylum: Madness			2011	Graphic novel; also known as Batman: Arkham Asylum: Madness	
Arkham City: The Order of the World		#1–6	Dec 2021 – May 2022	Limited series	
Arkham Manor		#1–6	Dec 2014 – May 2015		
Arkham Manor	Endgame	#1	Jun 2015	One-shot	
Arkham Reborn		#1–3	Dec 2009 – Feb 2010	Limited series	
ArkhaManiacs			2020	Graphic novel	
Armageddon 2001		#1–2	May 1991 – Sep 1991	Limited series	
Armageddon: Inferno		#1–4	Apr 1992 – Jul 1992	Limited series	
Armageddon: The Alien Agenda		#1–4	Nov 1991 – Feb 1992	Limited series	
Army at War		#1	Oct/Nov 1978	Cancelled after first issue as part of the DC Implosion	
Arrow		#1–12	Jan 2013 – Dec 2013	Based on the TV series	
Arrow Season 2.5		#1–12	Dec 2014 – Nov 2015	Based on the TV series	
Arsenal		#1–4	Oct 1998 – Jan 1999	Limited series	
Arsenal		Special #1	Jul 1996	One-shot	
Artemis: Requiem		#1–6	Jun 1996 – Nov 1996	Limited series	
Artemis: Wanted		#1	Sep 2022	One-shot	
Assassin's Creed: The Fall		#1–3	Jan 2011 – Mar 2011	Limited series	
Assassins		#1	Apr 1996	One-shot; published under the Amalgam Comics imprint in association with Marvel	
Atari Force		#1–20	Jan 1984 – Aug 1985		
Atari Force		Special #1	Apr 1986		
The Atlantis Chronicles		#1–7	Mar 1990 – Sep 1990	Limited series	
The Atom		#1–38	Jun/Jul 1962 – Aug/Sep 1968	Becomes The Atom and Hawkman	
The Atom		Special #1–2	1993 – 1994		
The Atom and Hawkman		#39–45	Oct/Nov 1968 – Oct/Nov 1969	Formerly The Atom	
The Atom and Hawkman		#46	Mar 2010	Blackest Night tie-in	
The Authority/Lobo: Jingle Hell		#1	Feb 2004	One-shot; WildStorm crossover	
The Authority/Lobo: Spring Break Massacre		#1	Aug 2005	One-shot; WildStorm crossover	
Avatar		#1–3	Feb 1991 – Apr 1991	Limited series	
Avengers/JLA		#2, 4	Oct 2003; Dec 2003	Limited series; issues #1 & 3 published by Marvel as JLA/Avengers	
Azrael	vol. 1	#1–46	Feb 1995 – Oct 1998	Becomes Azrael: Agent of the Bat	
Azrael	vol. 1	#1,000,000	Nov 1998	DC One Million tie-in	
Azrael	vol. 1	Annual #1–3	1995 – 1997		
Azrael	vol. 1	Plus #1	1996		
Azrael	vol. 2	#1–18	Nov 2009 – May 2011		
Azrael: Agent of the Bat		#47–100	Dec 1998 – May 2003	Formerly Azrael	
Azrael/Ash			1997	Graphic novel; co-published with Event Comics	
Azrael: Death's Dark Knight		#1–3	May 2009 – Jul 2009	Limited series	
Aztek: The Ultimate Man		#1–10	Aug 1996 – May 1997		

== B ==
Title	Series	Issues	Dates	Notes	Reference
Babylon 5		#1–11	Jan 1995 – Dec 1995		
Babylon 5: In Valen's Name		#1–3	Mar 1998 – May 1998	Limited series	
Bad Dream: A Dreamer Story			2024	Graphic novel	
Bad Girls		#1–5	Oct 2003 – Feb 2004	Limited series	
Bane: Conquest		#1–12	Jul 2017 – Jun 2018	Limited series	
Barbara Gordon: Breakout		#1–	Jul 2026 – present		
Barda			2024	Graphic novel	
Barkham Asylum			2024	Graphic novel	
Basketful of Heads		#1–7	Dec 2019 – Jul 2020	Limited series; published under the DC Black Label/Hill House Comics imprint	
Bat Lash	vol. 1	#1–7	Oct/Nov 1968 – Oct/Nov 1969		
Bat Lash	vol. 2	#1–6	Feb 2008 – Jul 2008	Limited series	
Batgirl	vol. 1	#1–73	Apr 2000 – Apr 2006		
Batgirl	vol. 1	Annual #1	Aug 2000		
Batgirl	vol. 1	Secret Files #1	Aug 2002		
Batgirl	vol. 2	#1–6	Jul 2008 – Dec 2008	Limited series	
Batgirl	vol. 3	#1–24	Oct 2009 – Oct 2011		
Batgirl	vol. 4	#0–52	Nov 2011 – Jul 2016	Issue #0 was published between #12 and #13	
Batgirl	vol. 4	Annual #1–3	2012 – 2015		
Batgirl	vol. 4	Futures End #1	Nov 2014		
Batgirl	vol. 5	#1–50	Sep 2016 – Dec 2020		
Batgirl	vol. 5	Annual #1–2	May 2017 – Oct 2018		
Batgirl	vol. 6	#1–	Jan 2025 – present		
Batgirl	Endgame	#1	May 2015	One-shot	
Batgirl & the Birds of Prey		#1–22	Oct 2016 – Jul 2018		
Batgirl & the Birds of Prey		Rebirth #1	Sep 2016		
The Batgirl Adventures		#1	Feb 1998	One-shot	
Batgirl Special		#1	1988	One-shot	
Batgirl: Year One		#1–9	Feb 2003 – Oct 2003	Limited series	
Batgirls		#1–19	Feb 2022 – Aug 2023		
Batgirls		2022 Annual	2022		
The Bat-Man: First Knight		#1–3	May 2024 – Jul 2024	Limited series; published under the DC Black Label imprint	
The Bat-Man: Second Knight		#1–3	Nov 2025 – Apr 2026	Limited series; published under the DC Black Label imprint	
Batman	vol. 1	#1–713	Spring 1940 – Oct 2011		
Batman	vol. 1	#0	Oct 1994	Zero Hour tie-in	
Batman	vol. 1	#1,000,000	Nov 1998	DC One Million tie-in	
Batman	vol. 1	Annual #1–28	1961 – 2011		
Batman	vol. 1	Plus #1	Feb 1997		
Batman	vol. 1	Secret Files #1	Oct 1997		
Batman	vol. 1	Special #1	1984		
Batman	vol. 2	#0–52	Nov 2011 – Jul 2016	Issue #0 was published between #12 and #13	
Batman	vol. 2	#23.1–23.4	Nov 2013	Forever Evil tie-ins	
Batman	vol. 2	Annual #1–4	2012 – 2015		
Batman	vol. 2	Futures End #1	Nov 2014		
Batman	vol. 3	#1–163	Aug 2016 – Jul 2026		
Batman	vol. 3	Annual #1–5	2017 – 2020		
Batman	vol. 3	2021 – 2022 Annual	2021 – 2022		
Batman	vol. 3	Rebirth #1	Aug 2016		
Batman	vol. 3	Secret Files #1–3	Dec 2018 – Aug 2020		
Batman	vol. 4	#1–	Nov 2025 – present		
Batman 3-D		#1	1990	One-shot	
Batman '66		#1–30	Jul 2013 – Dec 2015	Print edition of the weekly web comic of the same title, which began in July 2013; based on Batman (TV series)	
Batman '66	The Lost Episode	#1	Jan 2015	One-shot	
Batman '66 Meets Steed and Mrs Peel		#1–6	Sep 2016 – Feb 2017	Limited series	
Batman '66 Meets the Green Hornet		#1–6	Aug 2014 – Jan 2015	Limited series	
Batman '66 Meets the Legion of Super-Heroes		#1	Sep 2017	One-shot	
Batman '66 Meets the Man from U.N.C.L.E.		#1–6	Feb 2016 – Jul 2016	Limited series	
Batman '66 Meets Wonder Woman '77		#1–6	Mar 2017 – Aug 2017	Limited series	
Batman 80-Page Giant	vol. 1	#1–3	Aug 1998 – Jul 2000		
Batman 80-Page Giant	vol. 2	#1	Feb 2010	One-shot	
Batman 80-Page Giant	2010	#1	Feb 2011	One-shot	
Batman 80-Page Giant	2011	#1	Oct 2011	One-shot	
Batman '89		#1–6	Oct 2021 – Sep 2022	Limited series	
Batman '89	Echoes	#1–6	Jan 2024 – Sep 2025	Limited series	
Batman #428: Robin Lives!		#1	Feb 2024	One-shot	
Batman: Absolution			2002	Graphic novel	
The Batman Adventures	vol. 1	#1–36	Oct 1992 – Oct 1995	Takes place in the DC Animated Universe	
The Batman Adventures	vol. 1	Annual #1–2	1994 – 1995	Takes place in the DC Animated Universe	
The Batman Adventures	vol. 1	Holiday Special #1	1995	Takes place in the DC Animated Universe	
The Batman Adventures	vol. 2	#1–17	Jun 2003 – Nov 2004	Takes place in the DC Animated Universe	
The Batman Adventures: Mad Love			Feb 1994	One-shot	
The Batman Adventures: The Lost Years		#1–5	Jan 1998 – May 1998	Limited series	
Batman/Aliens		#1–2	Mar 1997 – Apr 1997	Limited series; co-published with Dark Horse Comics	
Batman/Aliens II		#1–3	Feb 2003 – May 2003	Limited series; co-published with Dark Horse Comics	
Batman Allies Secret Files and Origins			Aug 2005	One-shot	
Batman and Dracula: Red Rain			1991	Elseworlds graphic novel	
Batman and Robin	vol. 1	#1–26	Jun 2009 – Oct 2011		
Batman and Robin	vol. 2	#0–40	Nov 2011 – Mar 2015	Issue #0 was published between #12 and #13	
Batman and Robin	vol. 2	#23.1–23.4	Nov 2013	Forever Evil tie-ins	
Batman and Robin	vol. 2	Annual #1–3	2013 – 2015		
Batman and Robin	vol. 2	Futures End #1	Nov 2014		
Batman and Robin	vol. 3	#1–30	Nov 2023 – Apr 2026		
Batman and Robin	vol. 3	2024 Annual	2024		
Batman and Robin Adventures		#1–25	Nov 1995 – Dec 1997		
Batman and Robin Adventures		Annual #1–2	1996 – 1997		
Batman and Robin Adventures: Sub-Zero			1998	One-shot	
Batman and Robin and Howard			2021	Graphic novel	
Batman and Robin and Howard		#1–4	May 2024 – Aug 2024	Limited series; serialized reprinting of graphic novel	
Batman and Robin and Howard: Summer Breakdown		#1–3	Sep 2024 – Nov 2024	Limited series	
Batman and Robin Eternal		#1–26	Dec 2015 – May 2016		
Batman and Robin: The Official Comic Adaptation of the Warner Bros. Motion Picture			Jun 1997	One-shot adaptation of the Batman & Robin film	
Batman & Robin: Year One		#1–12	Dec 2024 – Dec 2025	Limited series	
Batman & Robin: Year One - Dynamic Duos		#1–12	Oct 2026 – present	Limited series	
The Batman & Scooby-Doo Mysteries	vol. 1	#1–12	Jun 2021 – May 2022	Limited series	
The Batman & Scooby-Doo Mysteries	vol. 2	#1–12	Dec 2022 – Nov 2023	Limited series	
The Batman & Scooby-Doo Mysteries	vol. 3	#1–12	Mar 2024 – Feb 2025		
The Batman & Scooby-Doo Mysteries	Extravaganza	#1	Aug 2021	One-shot; reprinting of The Batman & Scooby-Doo Mysteries vol. 1 #1–2	
Batman and Superman: World's Finest		#1–10	Apr 1999 – Jan 2000	Limited series	
Batman and Superman Adventures: World's Finest			1997	One-shot	
Batman & The Joker: The Deadly Duo		#1–7	Jan 2023 – Jul 2023	Limited series; published under the DC Black Label imprint	
Batman & The Joker: The Deadly Duo	Enemy of My Enemy Edition	#1	May 2023	One-shot; reprinting of Batman & The Joker: The Deadly Duo #1–3	
Batman & The Joker: The Deadly Duo	Unplugged	#1		Black-and-white, dialogue-free reprint of Batman & The Joker: The Deadly Duo #1–2	
Batman and the Justice League	vol. 1		Oct 2018	Manga	
Batman and the Justice League	vol. 2		Apr 2019	Manga	
Batman and the Justice League	vol. 3		Dec 2019	Manga	
Batman and the Mad Monk		#1–6	Oct 2006 – Feb 2007	Limited series	
Batman and the Outsiders	vol. 1	#1–32	Aug 1983 – Apr 1986	Becomes Adventures of the Outsiders	
Batman and the Outsiders	vol. 1	Annual #1–2	1984 – 1985	Becomes Adventures of the Outsiders	
Batman and the Outsiders	vol. 2	#1–14, 40	Oct 2007 – Feb 2009; Aug 2011	Becomes Outsiders vol. 4	
Batman and the Outsiders	vol. 2	Special #1	Mar 2009	Becomes Outsiders vol. 4	
Batman and the Outsiders	vol. 3	#1–17	Jul 2019 – Dec 2020		
Batman and the Outsiders	vol. 3	Annual #1	2019		
Batman and The Signal		#1–3	Mar 2018 – Jun 2018	Limited series	
Batman: Arkham Asylum Special			Dec 2009	One-shot	
Batman: Arkham Asylum: Tales of Madness		#1	May 1998	One-shot; part 16 of "Cataclysm" storyline	
Batman: Arkham Asylum: The Road to Arkham			2009	One-shot based on the video game Batman: Arkham Asylum	
Batman: Arkham City		#1–5	Jul 2011 – Oct 2011	Limited series	
Batman: Arkham City: End Game		#1	Jan 2013	One-shot	
Batman: Arkham City: Special Issue			2011	One-shot	
Batman: Arkham Knight		#1–12	May 2015 – Feb 2016	Based on the video game	
Batman: Arkham Knight		Annual #1	2015	Based on the video game	
Batman: Arkham Knight	Batgirl & Harley Quinn	#1	Apr 2016	One-shot	
Batman: Arkham Knight	Genesis	#1–6	Oct 2015 – Mar 2016	Limited series	
Batman: Arkham Knight	Robin	Special #1	Jan 2016		
Batman: Arkham Origins			2014	One-shot	
Batman: Arkham Unhinged		#1–20	Jun 2012 – Jan 2014		
Batman: Bad Seeds	Gotham Central	#1–2	Nov 2026 – Dec 2026	Limited series	
Batman: Bad Seeds	Gotham General	#1–2	Dec 2026 – present	Limited series	
Batman: Bad Seeds	Streets of Gotham	#1	Dec 2026	One-shot	
Batman: Bad Seeds	Sunrise	#1	Dec 2026	One-shot	
Batman: Bad Seeds	Sunset	#1	Oct 2026	One-shot	
Batman: Bane			1997	One-shot	
Batman: Bane of the Demon		#1–4	Mar 1998 – Jun 1998	Limited series	
Batman: Batgirl (1997)			1997	One-shot	
Batman: Batgirl (1998)		#1	Jun 1998	One-shot; part of the GirlFrenzy! series	
Batman: Battle for the Cowl		#1–3	May 2009 – Jul 2009	Limited series	
Batman: Battle for the Cowl	Arkham Asylum	#1	Jun 2009	One-shot	
Batman: Battle for the Cowl	Commissioner Gordon	#1	May 2009	One-shot	
Batman: Battle for the Cowl	Man-Bat	#1	Jun 2009	One-shot	
Batman: Battle for the Cowl	The Network	#1	Jul 2009	One-shot	
Batman: Battle for the Cowl	The Underground	#1	Jun 2009	One-shot	
Batman Begins: The Official Movie Adaptation			2005	One-shot adaptation of the Batman Begins film	
Batman Beyond	vol. 1	#1–6	Mar 1999 – Aug 1999	Limited series	
Batman Beyond	vol. 2	#1–24	Nov 1999 – Oct 2001		
Batman Beyond	vol. 3	#1–6	Aug 2010 – Jan 2011	Limited series	
Batman Beyond	vol. 4	#1–8	Mar 2011 – Oct 2011		
Batman Beyond	vol. 5	#1–16	Aug 2015 – Nov 2016	Sequel to The New 52: Futures End, taking place after Terry McGinnis's death, with Tim Drake taking up the mantle of Batman from him.	
Batman Beyond	vol. 6	#1–50	Dec 2016 – Feb 2021		
Batman Beyond	vol. 6	Rebirth #1	Nov 2016		
Batman Beyond: Neo-Gothic		#1–6	Sep 2023 – Feb 2024		
Batman Beyond: Neo-Year		#1–6	Jun 2022 – Nov 2022	Limited series	
Batman Beyond: Return of the Joker			Feb 2001	One-shot adaptation of the animated film Batman Beyond: Return of the Joker	
Batman: Beyond the White Knight		#1–8	May 2022 – Apr 2023	Limited series; published under the DC Black Label imprint	
Batman: Beyond the White Knight	Showcase Edition	#1	Jul 2022	One-shot; reprinting of Batman: Beyond the White Knight #1–2	
Batman Beyond Universe		#1–16	Oct 2013 – Jan 2015		
Batman Beyond Unlimited		#1–18	Apr 2012 – Sep 2013		
Batman: Birth of the Demon			1992	Graphic novel	
Batman Black and White	vol. 1	#1–4	Jun 1996 – Sep 1996	Limited series	
Batman Black and White	vol. 2	#1–6	Nov 2013 – Apr 2014	Limited series	
Batman Black and White	vol. 3	#1–6	Feb 2021 – Jul 2021	Limited series	
Batman: Blackgate		#1	Jan 1997	One-shot	
Batman: Blackgate: Isle of Men		#1	Apr 1998	Part 8 of "Cataclysm" storyline	
Batman: Bloodstorm			1994	Elseworlds graphic novel	
Batman: Book of the Dead		#1–2	Jun 1999 – Jul 1999	Elseworlds limited series	
Batman: Bride of the Demon			1991	Graphic novel	
Batman: Brotherhood of the Bat			1995	Elseworlds one-shot	
Batman: Bullock's Law		#1	Aug 1999	One-shot	
Batman: Cacophony		#1–3	Jan 2009 – Mar 2009	Limited series	
Batman/Captain America			1996	Elseworlds one-shot; co-published with Marvel; also known as Batman & Captain America	
Batman: Castle of the Bat			1994	Elseworlds one-shot	
Batman/Catwoman		#1–12	Feb 2021 – Aug 2022	Limited series; published under the DC Black Label imprint	
Batman/Catwoman		Special #1	Mar 2022	One-shot; published under the DC Black Label imprint	
Batman/Catwoman: Follow the Money		#1	Jan 2011	One-shot	
Batman/Catwoman: The Gotham War	Battle Lines	#1	Oct 2023	One-shot	
Batman/Catwoman: The Gotham War	Red Hood	#1–2	Nov 2023 – Dec 2023	Limited series	
Batman/Catwoman: The Gotham War	Scorched Earth	#1	Dec 2023	One-shot	
Batman/Catwoman: Trail of the Gun		#1–2	Aug 2004 – Sep 2004	Limited series	
Batman: Child of Dreams			2003	Collected edition of the manga series published by Magazine Z	
The Batman Chronicles		#1–23	Summer 1995 – Winter 2001		
The Batman Chronicles		Gallery #1	May 1997		
Batman Chronicles: The Gauntlet			1997	One-shot	
Batman: City of Light		#1–8	Dec 2003 – Jul 2004	Limited series	
Batman: City of Madness		#1–3	Dec 2023 – Apr 2024	Limited series; published under the DC Black Label imprint	
Batman Confidential		#1–54	Feb 2007 – May 2011		
Batman: Creature of the Night		#1–4	Jan 2018 – Jan 2020	Limited series; 19-month delay between issues #3 & 4	
Batman: Crimson Mist			1998	Elseworlds graphic novel	
Batman: Curse of the White Knight		#1–8	Sep 2019 – May 2020	Limited series; published under the DC Black Label imprint	
Batman: Damned		#1–3	Nov 2018 – Aug 2019	Limited series; published under the DC Black Label imprint	
Batman/Danger Girl			Feb 2005	One-shot; WildStorm crossover	
Batman/Daredevil			2000	One-shot; co-published with Marvel; also known as Batman/Daredevil: King of New York	
Batman: Dark Age		#1–6	May 2024 – Jan 2025	Limited series	
Batman: Dark Allegiances			1996	Elseworlds one-shot	
Batman: Dark Detective		#1–6	Jul 2005 – Sep 2005	Limited series	
Batman: Dark Joker - The Wild			1993	Elseworlds graphic novel	
Batman: Dark Knight Dynasty			1997	Elseworlds graphic novel	
Batman: Dark Knight Gallery		#1	Jan 1996	One-shot	
Batman: Dark Knight of the Round Table		#1–2	Oct 1999 – Nov 1999	Elseworlds limited series	
Batman: Dark Patterns		#1–12	Feb 2025 – Jan 2026	Limited series	
Batman: Dark Victory		#0–13	Sep 1999 – Dec 2000	Limited series	
Batman: Day of Judgment		#1	Nov 1999	One-shot	
Batman/Deadman: Death and Glory			1996	Graphic novel	
Batman: Dear Detective		#1	Nov 2022	One-shot	
Batman: Death and the Maidens		#1–9	Oct 2003 – Aug 2004	Limited series	
Batman: Death by Design			2012	Graphic novel	
Batman: Death Mask		#1–4	Jun 2008 – Sep 2008	Manga; limited series	
Batman: Death of Innocents		#1	Dec 1996	One-shot	
Batman/Deathblow: After the Fire		#1–3	Mar 2002 – Aug 2002	Limited series; WildStorm crossover	
Batman/Demon			1996	One-shot	
Batman/Demon: A Tragedy			2000	Elseworlds one-shot	
Batman: Detective No. 27			2003	Elseworlds graphic novel	
Batman: Digital Justice			1990	Graphic novel	
Batman: DOA			Dec 1999	One-shot	
Batman/Doc Savage Special		#1	Jan 2010	One-shot	
Batman: Dreamland			Jul 2000	One-shot	
Batman/Dylan Dog		#1–3	May 2024 – Jul 2024	Limited series	
Batman: Earth One	vol. 1		2012	Graphic novel	
Batman: Earth One	vol. 2		2015	Graphic novel	
Batman: Earth One	vol. 3		2021	Graphic novel	
Batman: Ego			Aug 2000	One-shot	
Batman/Elmer Fudd Special		#1	Aug 2017	One-shot	
Batman Eternal		#1–52	Apr 2014 – Apr 2015		
Batman: Europa		#1–4	Jan 2016 – Apr 2016	Limited series	
Batman: Family		#1–8	Dec 2002 – Feb 2003	Limited series	
The Batman Family		#1–20	Sep/Oct 1975 – Oct/Nov 1978		
Batman/FaZe Clan		#1	May 2022	One-shot	
Batman: Fear State	Alpha	#1	Oct 2021	One-shot	
Batman: Fear State	Omega	#1	Jan 2022	One-shot	
Batman Forever: The Official Comic Adaptation of the Warner Bros. Motion Picture			1995	One-shot adaptation of the Batman Forever film	
Batman/Fortnite	Foundation	#1	Dec 2021	One-shot	
Batman/Fortnite	Zero Point	#1–6	Jun 2021 – Sep 2021	Limited series	
Batman: Fortress		#1–8	Jul 2022 – Mar 2023	Limited series	
Batman: Fortunate Son			1999	Graphic novel	
Batman: Full Circle			1991	One-shot	
Batman: Full Moon		#1–4	Dec 2024 – May 2025	Limited series; published under the DC Black Label imprint	
The Batman Gallery		#1	1992	One-shot	
Batman: Gargoyle of Gotham		#1–4	Nov 2023 – Aug 2026	Limited series; published under the DC Black Label imprint	
Batman: Gates of Gotham		#1–5	Jul 2011 – Oct 2011	Limited series	
Batman: GCPD		#1–4	Aug 1996 – Nov 1996	Limited series	
Batman: Ghosts: Legends of the Dark Knight Halloween Special			1995	One-shot	
Batman: Gordon of Gotham		#1–4	Jun 1998 – Sep 1998	Limited series	
Batman: Gordon's Law		#1–4	Dec 1996 – Mar 1997	Limited series	
Batman: Gotham Adventures		#1–60	Jun 1998 – May 2003	Takes place in the DC Animated Universe	
Batman: Gotham After Midnight		#1–12	May 2008 – May 2009	Limited series	
Batman: Gotham by Gaslight - A League for Justice		#1–6	Sep 2025 – Feb 2026	Elseworlds limited series	
Batman: Gotham by Gaslight - The Kryptonian Age		#1–6	Aug 2024 – Jan 2025	Elseworlds limited series	
Batman: Gotham City Secret Files		#1	Apr 2000	One-shot	
Batman: Gotham County Line		#1–3	Dec 2005 – Feb 2006	Limited series	
Batman: Gotham Knights		#1–74	Mar 2000 – Apr 2006		
Batman: Gotham Knights - Gilded City		#1–6	Dec 2022 – May 2023	Limited series; video game tie-in	
Batman: Gotham Nights		#1–4	Mar 1992 – Jun 1992	Limited series; also known as Gotham Nights	
Batman: Gotham Nights II		#1–4	Mar 1995 – Jun 1995	Limited series	
Batman: Gotham Noir			2001	Elseworlds one-shot	
Batman/Green Arrow: The Poison Tomorrow			1992	One-shot	
Batman/Green Arrow/The Question: Arcadia		#1–4	Jan 2026 – Sep 2026	Limited series; published under the DC Black Label imprint	
Batman/Grendel	vol. 1	#1–2	Apr 1993 – May 1993	Limited series; co-published with Comico	
Batman/Grendel	vol. 2	#1–2	Jun 1996 – Jul 1996	Limited series; co-published with Dark Horse Comics	
Batman: Harley & Ivy		#1–3	Jun 2004 – Aug 2004	Limited series	
Batman: Harley Quinn			1999	One-shot	
Batman: Harvest Breed			2000	Graphic novel	
Batman: Haunted Gotham		#1–4	Feb 2000 – May 2000	Elseworlds limited series	
Batman/Hellboy/Starman		#1–2	Jan 1999 – Feb 1999	Limited series; co-published with Dark Horse Comics	
Batman: Hidden Treasures		#1	Dec 2010	One-shot	
Batman: Hollywood Knight		#1–3	Apr 2001 – Jun 2001	Elseworlds limited series	
Batman: Holy Terror			1991	Elseworlds one-shot	
Batman: Hong Kong			2003	Graphic novel	
Batman/Houdini: The Devil's Workshop			1992	Elseworlds one-shot	
Batman/Huntress: Cry for Blood		#1–6	Jun 2000 – Dec 2000	Limited series	
Batman: Huntress/Spoiler: Blunt Trauma		#1	May 1998	Part 13 of "Cataclysm" storyline; also known as Batman: Spoiler/Huntress: Blunt Trauma	
Batman: I, Joker			1998	Elseworlds one-shot	
Batman in Barcelona: Dragon's Knight		#1	Jul 2009	One-shot	
Batman: In Darkest Knight			1994	Elseworlds one-shot	
Batman in Noir Alley			2017	One-shot	
Batman Incorporated	vol 1	#1–8	Jan 2011 – Oct 2011		
Batman Incorporated	vol 2	#0–13	May 2012 – Jul 2013	Issue #0 was published between #3 and #4	
Batman Incorporated	vol 2	Special #1	Aug 2013		
Batman Incorporated	vol. 3	#1–12	Dec 2022 – Nov 2023		
Batman Incorporated	Leviathan Strikes	#1	Feb 2012	One-shot	
Batman: Jekyll & Hyde		#1–6	Jun 2005 – Nov 2005	Limited series	
Batman/Joker: Switch		#1	2003	One-shot	
Batman: Joker Time		#1–3	2000	Limited series	
Batman: Joker's Apprentice		#1	May 1999	One-shot	
Batman: Joker's Daughter		#1	Apr 2014	One-shot	
Batman: Journey into Knight		#1–12	Oct 2005 – Nov 2006	Limited series	
Batman/Judge Dredd: Die Laughing		#1–2	Nov 1998 – Dec 1998	Limited series; co-published with Fleetway	
Batman/Judge Dredd: Judgment on Gotham			Dec 1991	One-shot; co-published with Fleetway	
Batman/Judge Dredd: The Ultimate Riddle			Sep 1995	One-shot; co-published with Fleetway	
Batman/Judge Dredd: Vendetta in Gotham			1993	One-shot; co-published with Fleetway	
Batman: Killing Time		#1–6	May 2022 – Oct 2022	Limited series	
Batman: Kings of Fear		#1–6	Oct 2018 – Mar 2019	Limited series	
Batman: KnightGallery			1995	Elseworlds one-shot	
Batman - Knightwatch		#1–5	Nov 2022 – Mar 2023	Limited series	
Batman: Last Knight on Earth		#1–3	Jul 2019 – Feb 2020	Limited series; published under the DC Black Label imprint	
Batman: League of Batmen		#1–2	2001	Elseworlds limited series	
Batman: Legends of Gotham		#1	Mar 2023	One-shot	
Batman: Legends of the Dark Knight		#37–214	Aug 1992 – Mar 2007	Formerly Legends of the Dark Knight	
Batman: Legends of the Dark Knight		#0	Oct 1994	Zero Hour tie-in	
Batman: Legends of the Dark Knight		Annual #3–7	1993–1997		
Batman: Legends of the Dark Knight		Halloween Special #1	Dec 1993		
Batman: Legends of the Dark Knight: Jazz		#1–3	Apr 1995 – Jun 1995	Limited series	
Batman: Legends of the Dark Knight Special			2010	One-shot	
Batman: Li'l Gotham		#1–12	Jun 2013 – May 2014	Print edition of digital series of the same title	
Batman/Lobo			2000	Elseworlds one-shot	
Batman/Lobo: Deadly Serious		#1–2	Aug 2007 – Sep 2007	Limited series	
Batman: Lost		#1	Jan 2018	One-shot; Dark Nights: Metal tie-in	
Batman: Madness - A Legends of the Dark Knight Halloween Special			1994	One-shot	
Batman: Manbat		#1–3	Oct 1995 – Dec 1995	Elseworlds limited series	
Batman: Mask of the Phantasm			1994	One-shot movie adaptation	
Batman: Masque			1997	Elseworlds one-shot	
Batman: Master of the Future			1991	Elseworlds one-shot	
Batman: Mitefall			1995	One-shot	
Batman: Mr. Freeze			1997	One-shot	
Batman: Nevermore		#1–5	Jun 2003 – Oct 2003	Elseworlds limited series	
Batman: Night Cries			1992	Graphic novel	
Batman: Nightwalker			2019	Graphic novel; published under the DC Ink imprint	
Batman/Nightwing: Bloodborne			2002	One-shot	
Batman: Nine Lives			2002	Elseworlds graphic novel	
Batman: No Man's Land		#1	Mar 1999	One-shot	
Batman: No Man's Land		#0	Dec 1999	One-shot	
Batman: No Man's Land		Gallery #1	Jul 1999	One-shot	
Batman: No Man's Land		Secret Files #1	Dec 1999		
Batman: Noël			2011	Graphic novel	
Batman: Nosferatu			1999	Elseworlds one-shot	
Batman: Odyssey	vol. 1	#1–6	Sep 2010 – Feb 2011	Limited series	
Batman: Odyssey	vol. 2	#1–7	Dec 2011 – Jun 2012	Limited series	
The Batman of Arkham			Jun 2000	Elseworlds one-shot	
Batman of Two Worlds		#1	Nov 2026	One-shot	
Batman: Off-World		#1–6	Jan 2024 – Apr 2025	Limited series	
Batman - One Bad Day	Bane	#1	Mar 2023	One-shot	
Batman - One Bad Day	Catwoman	#1	Mar 2023	One-shot	
Batman - One Bad Day	Clayface	#1	Apr 2023	One-shot	
Batman - One Bad Day	Mr. Freeze	#1	Jan 2023	One-shot	
Batman - One Bad Day	Penguin	#1	Dec 2022	One-shot	
Batman - One Bad Day	Ra's Al Ghul	#1	May 2023	One-shot	
Batman - One Bad Day	The Riddler	#1	Oct 2022	One-shot	
Batman - One Bad Day	Two-Face	#1	Nov 2022	One-shot	
Batman: One Dark Knight		#1–3	Feb 2022 – Sep 2022	Limited series; published under the DC Black Label imprint	
Batman: Orphans		#1–2	Feb 2011	Limited series	
Batman: Orpheus Rising		#1–5	Oct 2001 – Feb 2002	Limited series	
Batman: Our Worlds at War		#1	2001	One-shot	
Batman: Outlaws		#1–3	Sep 2000 – Nov 2000	Limited series	
Batman: Overdrive			2020	Graphic novel	
Batman: Penguin Triumphant			1992	One-shot	
Batman: Pennyworth R.I.P.		#1	Apr 2020	One-shot	
Batman/Phantom Stranger			1997	One-shot	
Batman: Poison Ivy			May 1997	One-shot	
Batman/Poison Ivy: Cast Shadows			2004	One-shot	
Batman/Predator III		#1–4	Nov 1997 – Feb 1998	Limited series; co-published with Dark Horse Comics	
Batman: Prelude to the Wedding	Batgirl vs. Riddler	#1	Jun 2018	One-shot	
Batman: Prelude to the Wedding	Harley Quinn vs. Joker	#1	Jun 2018	One-shot	
Batman: Prelude to the Wedding	Nightwing vs. Hush	#1	Jun 2018	One-shot	
Batman: Prelude to the Wedding	Red Hood vs. Anarky	#1	Jun 2018	One-shot	
Batman: Prelude to the Wedding	Robin vs. Ras Al'Ghul	#1	Jun 2018	One-shot	
Batman/Punisher: Lake of Fire			1994	One-shot; co-published with Marvel	
Batman: Reign of Terror			1999	Elseworlds one-shot	
Batman: Reptilian		#1–6	Aug 2021 – Jan 2022	Limited series; published under the DC Black Label imprint	
Batman Returns: The Official Comic Adaptation of the Warner Bros. Motion Picture			1992	One-shot adaptation of the Batman Returns film	
Batman: Riddler - The Riddle Factory			1995	One-shot	
Batman: Room Full of Strangers			Apr 2004	One-shot	
Batman: Run, Riddler, Run		#1–3	May 1992 – Jul 1992	Limited series	
Batman - Santa Claus: Silent Knight		#1–4	Feb 2024	Weekly limited series	
Batman - Santa Claus: Silent Knight Returns		#1–5	Jan 2025 – Feb 2025	Weekly limited series	
Batman: Scar of the Bat			1996	Elseworlds one-shot	
Batman/Scarecrow 3-D		#1	Dec 1998	One-shot	
Batman/Scarecrow: Fear			2006	One-shot	
Batman/Scarface: A Psychodrama			2001	One-shot	
Batman: Scottish Connection			1998	One-shot	
Batman Secret Files	Clownhunter	#1	Oct 2021	One-shot	
Batman Secret Files	Huntress	#1	Sep 2021	One-shot	
Batman Secret Files	Miracle Molly	#1	Nov 2021	One-shot	
Batman Secret Files	Peacekeeper	#1	Dec 2021	One-shot; also known as Batman Secret Files: Peacekeeper-01	
Batman Secret Files	The Gardener	#1	Jan 2022	One-shot	
Batman Secret Files	The Signal	#1	Sep 2021	One-shot	
Batman: Secrets		#1–5	May 2006 – Sep 2006	Limited series	
Batman: Seduction of the Gun		#1	Feb 1992	One-shot	
Batman/Shadow		#1–6	Jun 2017 – Nov 2017	Limited series; co-published with Dynamite Entertainment	
Batman: Shadow of the Bat		#1–94	Jun 1992 – Feb 2000		
Batman: Shadow of the Bat		#0	Oct 1994	Zero Hour tie-in	
Batman: Shadow of the Bat		#1,000,000	Nov 1998	DC One Million tie-in	
Batman: Shadow of the Bat		Annual #1–5	1993 – 1997		
Batman: Sins of the Father		#1–6	Feb 2018 – Sep 2018	Limited series; based on the Batman: The Telltale Series video game	
Batman: Son of the Demon			1987	Graphic novel	
Batman/Spawn		#1	Feb 2023	One-shot	
Batman/Spawn	Unplugged	#1	Apr 2023	Black-and-white, dialogue-free reprint	
Batman/Spawn: War Devil			1994	One-shot; co-published with Image Comics	
Batman/Spider-Man			Oct 1997	One-shot; co-published with Marvel; also known as Batman and Spider-Man	
Batman/Static: Beyond		#1–6	Jan 2026 – Jul 2026	Elseworlds limited series	
Batman: Streets of Gotham		#1–21	Jun 2009 – Mar 2011		
The Batman Strikes!		#1–50	Nov 2004 – Dec 2008		
Batman/Superman	vol. 1	#1–34	Aug 2013 – Jul 2016; Apr 2017	Previously unreleased issues #33 & 34 published in collection Volume 6: Universe's Finest	
Batman/Superman	vol. 1	#3.1	Nov 2013	Forever Evil tie-in	
Batman/Superman	vol. 1	Annual #1–3	2014 – 2015; 2017	Previously unreleased Annual #3 published in collection Volume 6: Universe's Finest	
Batman/Superman	vol. 1	Futures End #1	Nov 2014		
Batman/Superman	vol. 2	#1–22	Oct 2019 – Nov 2021		
Batman/Superman	vol. 2	Annual #1	2020		
Batman/Superman	vol. 2	2021 Annual	2021		
Batman/Superman: Authority Special		#1	Jan 2022	One-shot	
Batman/Superman/Weird Al: World’s Weirdest		#1	Nov 2026	One-shot	
Batman/Superman/Wonder Woman: Trinity		#1–3	Aug 2003 – Oct 2003	Limited series	
Batman/Superman: World's Finest		#1–	May 2022 – present		
Batman/Superman: World's Finest		2024 Annual	2024		
Batman/Superman: World's Finest		2025 Annual #1	2025		
Batman/Superman: World's Finest		2026 Annual #1	2026		
Batman: Sword of Azrael		#1–4	Oct 1992 – Jan 1993	Limited series	
Batman Tales: Once Upon a Crime			2020	Graphic novel	
Batman/Tarzan: Claws of the Cat-Woman		#1–4	Sep 1999 – Dec 1999	Elseworlds limited series; co-published with Dark Horse Comics	
Batman/Teenage Mutant Ninja Turtles		#1–6	Feb 2016 – Jul 2016	Limited series; co-published with IDW	
Batman/Teenage Mutant Ninja Turtles II		#1–6	Feb 2018 – Jun 2018	Limited series; co-published with IDW	
Batman/Teenage Mutant Ninja Turtles III		#1–6	Jul 2019 – Dec 2019	Limited series; co-published with IDW	
Batman/Teenage Mutant Ninja Turtles Adventures		#1–6	Nov 2016 – Apr 2017	Limited series; co-published with IDW	
Batman: Tenses		#1–2	Oct 2003 – Nov 2003	Limited series	
Batman: The 10 Cent Adventure			Mar 2002	One-shot	
Batman: The 12 Cent Adventure		#1	Oct 2004	One-shot	
Batman: The Abduction			Apr 1998	One-shot	
Batman: The Adventures Continue	vol. 1	#1–8	Aug 2020 – Mar 2021	Limited series	
Batman: The Adventures Continue	vol. 2	#1–7	Aug 2021 – Feb 2022	Limited series; titled Batman: The Adventures Continue: Season Two	
Batman: The Adventures Continue	vol. 3	#1–8	Mar 2023 – Dec 2023	Limited series; titled Batman: The Adventures Continue: Season Three	
Batman: The Ankh		#1–2	Nov 2001 – Dec 2001	Limited series	
Batman: The Audio Adventures		#1–7	Nov 2022 – Sep 2023	Limited series	
Batman: The Audio Adventures Special		#1	Dec 2021	One-shot	
Batman: The Blue, the Grey, and the Bat			1992	Elseworlds one-shot	
Batman: The Book of Shadows			Jul 1999	One-shot	
Batman: The Brave and the Bold (2009)		#1–22	Mar 2009 – Dec 2010	Based on the animated series	
Batman: The Brave and the Bold (2023)		#1–20	Jul 2023 – Feb 2025		
Batman: The Chalice			1999	Graphic novel	
Batman: The Cult		#1–4	Aug 1988 – Nov 1988	Limited series	
Batman: The Dark Knight	vol. 1	#1–5	Jan 2011 – Oct 2011		
Batman: The Dark Knight	vol. 2	#0–29	Nov 2011 – Mar 2014	Issue #0 was published between #12 and #13	
Batman: The Dark Knight	vol. 2	#23.1–23.4	Nov 2013	Forever Evil tie-ins	
Batman: The Dark Knight	vol. 2	Annual #1	2013		
Batman: The Dark Knight Returns		#1–4	Feb 1986 – Jun 1986	Limited series	
Batman: The Dark Prince Charming		#1–2	Jan 2018 – Jun 2018	Graphic novel; published in two volumes	
Batman: The Dawnbreaker		#1	Dec 2017	One-shot; Dark Nights: Metal tie-in	
Batman: The Detective		#1–6	Jun 2021 – Jan 2022	Limited series	
Batman: The Devastator		#1	Jan 2018	One-shot; Dark Nights: Metal tie-in	
Batman: The Doom that Came to Gotham		#1–3	Nov 2000 – Jan 2001	Elseworlds limited series	
Batman: The Drowned		#1	Dec 2017	One-shot; Dark Nights: Metal tie-in	
Batman: The Golden Streets of Gotham			2003	Elseworlds one-shot	
Batman: The Hill		#1	May 2000	One-shot	
Batman: The Imposter		#1–3	Dec 2021 – Feb 2022	Limited series; published under the DC Black Label imprint	
Batman: The Joker War Zone		#1	Nov 2020	One-shot	
Batman: The Killing Joke			1988	One-shot	
Batman: The Knight		#1–10	Mar 2022 – Dec 2022	Limited series	
Batman: The Knight	Compendium Edition	#1	Jul 2022	One-shot; reprinting of Batman: The Knight #1–3	
Batman: The Last Angel			1994	Graphic novel	
Batman: The Long Halloween		#1–13	Dec 1996 – Dec 1997	Limited series	
Batman: The Long Halloween	Special	#1	Dec 2021	One-shot	
Batman: The Long Halloween: The Last Halloween		#0–10	Nov 2024 – Dec 2025	Limited series	
Batman: The Man Who Laughs			2005	One-shot	
Batman/The Maxx: Arkham Dreams		#1–5	Oct 2018 – Jan 2021	Limited series; co-published with IDW; two-year delay between issues #3 & 4	
Batman/The Maxx: Arkham Dreams	The Lost Year Compendium		Nov 2020	One-shot; co-published with IDW	
Batman: The Merciless		#1	Dec 2017	One-shot; Dark Nights: Metal tie-in	
Batman: The Monster Men		#1–6	Jan 2006 – Jun 2006	Limited series; also known as Batman and the Monster Men	
Batman: The Murder Machine		#1	Nov 2017	One-shot; Dark Nights: Metal tie-in	
Batman: The Official Comic Book Adaptation of the Warner Bros Motion Picture			1989	One-shot adaptation of the Batman film	
Batman: The Order of Beasts			2004	Elseworlds one-shot	
Batman: The Red Death		#1	Nov 2017	One-shot; Dark Nights: Metal tie-in	
Batman: The Return		#1	Jan 2011	One-shot	
Batman: The Return of Bruce Wayne		#1–6	Jul 2010 – Dec 2010	Limited series	
Batman: The Smile Killer		#1	Aug 2020	One-shot; published under the DC Black Label imprint	
Batman/The Spirit		#1	Jan 2007	One-shot	
Batman: The Ultimate Evil		#1–2	Nov 1995 – Dec 1995	Limited series	
Batman: The World			2021	Graphic novel	
Batman: Three Jokers		#1–3	Oct 2020 – Dec 2020	Limited series; published under the DC Black Label imprint	
Batman: Through the Looking Glass			2011	Graphic novel	
Batman: Toyman		#1–4	Nov 1998 – Feb 1999	Limited series	
Batman: Turning Points		#1–5	Jan 2001 – May 2001	Limited series	
Batman: Two-Face - Crime and Punishment			1996	One-shot	
Batman: Two-Face Strikes Twice		#1–2	Nov 1993 – Dec 1993	Limited series	
Batman: Two Faces		#1	Nov 1998	Elseworlds one-shot	
Batman: Uncovered		#1	Jan 2025	One-shot	
Batman: Universe		#1–6	Sep 2019 – Feb 2020	Limited series	
Batman: Unseen		#1–5	Dec 2009 – Feb 2010	Limited series	
Batman: Urban Legends		#1–23	May 2021 – Mar 2023		
Batman: Vengeance of Bane		#1	Jan 1993	One-shot	
Batman: Vengeance of Bane II			1995	One-shot	
Batman Versus Predator		#1–3	Dec 1991 – Feb 1992	Limited series; co-published with Dark Horse Comics	
Batman Versus Predator II: Bloodmatch		#1–4	1994 – 1995	Limited series; co-published with Dark Horse Comics	
Batman Villains Secret Files		#1	Oct 1998	One-shot	
Batman Villains Secret Files and Origins 2005			Jul 2005	One-shot	
Batman vs. Bigby! A Wolf In Gotham		#1–6	Nov 2021 – Apr 2022	Limited series; published under the DC Black Label imprint	
Batman vs. Ra's Al Ghul		#1–6	Nov 2019 – Jun 2021	Limited series	
Batman vs. Robin		#1–5	Nov 2022 – Apr 2023	Limited series	
Batman: War on Crime			1999	Graphic novel	
Batman: White Knight		#1–8	Dec 2017 – Jul 2018	Limited series	
Batman: White Knight Presents: Generation Joker		#1–6	Jul 2023 – Dec 2023	Limited series; published under the DC Black Label imprint	
Batman: White Knight Presents: Harley Quinn		#1–6	Dec 2020 – May 2021	Limited series; published under the DC Black Label imprint	
Batman: White Knight Presents: Red Hood		#1–2	Oct 2022	Limited series; published under the DC Black Label imprint	
Batman: White Knight Presents: Von Freeze		#1	Jan 2020	One-shot; published under the DC Black Label imprint	
The Batman Who Laughs		#1–7	Feb 2019 – Sep 2019	Limited series	
The Batman Who Laughs	The Grim Knight	#1	May 2019	One-shot	
Batman: Widening Gyre		#1–6	Sep 2009 – Feb 2010	Limited series	
Batman/Wildcat		#1–3	Apr 1997 – Jun 1997	Limited series	
Batman/Wonder Woman: Truth		#1	Jun 2026	One-shot	
Batman: Year 100		#1–4	Feb 2006 – May 2006	Limited series	
The Batman's Grave		#1–12	Dec 2019 – Feb 2021	Limited series	
Batman's Mystery Casebook			2022	Graphic novel	
Bat-Mite		#1–6	Aug 2015 – Jan 2016	Limited series	
Bat-Thing		#1	Jun 1997	One-shot; published under the Amalgam Comics imprint in association with Marvel	
Battle Classics		#1	Sep/Oct 1978	Series canceled after first issue	
Batwing		#0–34	Nov 2011 – Aug 2014	Issue #0 was published between #12 and #13	
Batwing		Futures End #1	Nov 2014		
Batwoman	vol. 1	#0–40	Jan 2011 – Mar 2015		
Batwoman	vol. 1	#0	Nov 2012	Published between #12 and #13; 2nd #0 issue published during this run	
Batwoman	vol. 1	Annual #1–2	2014 – 2015		
Batwoman	vol. 1	Futures End #1	Nov 2014		
Batwoman	vol. 2	#1–18	May 2017 – Oct 2018		
Batwoman	vol. 2	Rebirth #1	Apr 2017		
Batwoman	vol. 3	#1–	May 2026 – present		
Beast Boy		#1–4	Jan 2000 – Apr 2000	Limited series	
Before Watchmen	Comedian	#1–6	Aug 2012 – Jun 2013	Limited series	
Before Watchmen	Dollar Bill	#1	Mar 2013	One-shot	
Before Watchmen	Dr. Manhattan	#1–4	Oct 2012 – Apr 2013	Limited series	
Before Watchmen	Minutemen	#1–6	Aug 2012 – Mar 2013	Limited series	
Before Watchmen	Moloch	#1–2	Jan 2013 – Feb 2013	Limited series	
Before Watchmen	Nite Owl	#1–4	Aug 2012 – Feb 2013	Limited series	
Before Watchmen	Ozymandias	#1–6	Sep 2012 – Apr 2013	Limited series	
Before Watchmen	Rorschach	#1–4	Oct 2012 – Apr 2013	Limited series	
Before Watchmen	Silk Spectre	#1–4	Aug 2012 – Jan 2013	Limited series	
Beowulf		#1–6	Apr/May 1975 – Feb/Mar 1976		
The Best of DC		#1–71	Sep/Oct 1979 – Apr 1986	Digest-sized	
Best of the Brave and the Bold		#1–6	Oct 1988 – Jan 1989	Limited series	
Beware the Batman		#1–6	Dec 2013 – May 2014		
Beware the Creeper		#1–6	May/Jun 1968 – Mar/Apr 1969	See also Vertigo list	
Beyond The Fringe		#1	May 2012	One-shot; published under the DC Entertainment imprint	
The Big All-American Comic Book		#1	1944	One-shot	
The Big Book of Fun Comics		#1	Spring 1936	One-shot	
Big Daddy Danger		#1–9	Oct 2002 – Jun 2003	Limited series	
Big Town		#1–50	Jan 1951 – Mar/Apr 1958		
Bill & Ted's Excellent Adventure Movie Adaptation			1989	One-shot movie adaptation	
Billy Batson and the Magic of Shazam!		#1–21	Sep 2008 – Dec 2010		
Binky		#72–81, 82	Apr/May 1970 – Oct/Nov 1971; Summer 1977	Formerly Leave It to Binky	
Binky's Buddies		#1–12	Jan/Feb 1969 – Nov/Dec 1970		
Bionicle		#1–27	Jun 2001 – Nov 2005		
Bionicle Glatorian		#1–7	Jan 2009 – Mar 2010		
Bionicle: Ignition		#0–15	Jan 2006 – Nov 2008	Title changes to Bionicle: Battle for Power with issue #12	
Birds of Prey	vol. 1	#1–127	Jan 1999 – Feb 2009		
Birds of Prey	vol. 2	#1–15	Jul 2010 – Oct 2011		
Birds of Prey	vol. 3	#0–34	Nov 2011 – Aug 2014	Issue #0 was published between #12 and #13	
Birds of Prey	vol. 3	Futures End #1	Nov 2014		
Birds of Prey	vol. 4	#1	Aug 2020	One-shot; published under the DC Black Label imprint	
Birds of Prey	vol. 5	#1–28	Nov 2023 – Feb 2026		
Birds of Prey: Batgirl		#1	Feb 1998	One-shot; also known as Birds of Prey: Black Canary/Batgirl	
Birds of Prey: Batgirl/Catwoman		#1	Apr 2003	Followed by Birds of Prey: Catwoman/Oracle #2	
Birds of Prey: Catwoman/Oracle		#2	May 2003	Follows Birds of Prey: Batgirl/Catwoman #1	
Birds of Prey: Manhunt		#1–4	Sep 1996 – Dec 1996	Limited series	
Birds of Prey: Revolution		#1	Feb 1997	One-shot	
Birds of Prey Secret Files 2003			Aug 2003	One-shot	
Birds of Prey: The Origins			2026	Graphic novel	
Birds of Prey: The Ravens		#1	Jun 1998	One-shot; part of the GirlFrenzy! series	
Birds of Prey: Uncovered		#1	Feb 2024	One-shot	
Birds of Prey: Wolves		#1	Oct 1997	One-shot	
Bizarro		#1–6	Aug 2015 – Jan 2016	Limited series	
Bizarro Comics			2001	Graphic novel	
Bizarro World			2005	Graphic novel	
Bizarro: Year None		#1–4	Jun 2026 – present	Limited series	
Black Adam		#1–12	Aug 2022 – Aug 2023	Limited series	
Black Adam: Endless Winter Special		#1	Feb 2021	One-shot	
Black Adam: The Dark Age		#1–6	Oct 2007 – Mar 2008	Limited series	
Black Adam - The Justice Society Files	Atom Smasher	#1	Nov 2022	One-shot	
Black Adam - The Justice Society Files	Dr. Fate	#1	Dec 2022	One-shot	
Black Adam - The Justice Society Files	Cyclone	#1	Oct 2022	One-shot	
Black Adam - The Justice Society Files	Hawkman	#1	Sep 2022	One-shot	
Black Adam: Year of The Villain		#1	Dec 2019	One-shot	
Black Canary	vol. 1	#1–4	Nov 1991 – Feb 1992	Limited series (subtitled "New Wings" on the cover)	
Black Canary	vol. 2	#1–12	Jan 1993 – Dec 1993		
Black Canary	vol. 3	#1–4	Sep 2007 – Oct 2007	Bi-weekly limited series	
Black Canary	vol. 4	#1–12	Aug 2015 – Aug 2016		
Black Canary and Zatanna: Bloodspell			2014	Graphic novel	
Black Canary: Best of the Best		#1–6	Jan 2025 – Jul 2025	Limited series	
Black Canary: Ignite			2019	Graphic Novel; published under the DC Zoom imprint	
Black Canary/Oracle: Birds of Prey		#1	1996	One-shot	
Black Canary Wedding Planner		#1	Sep 2007	One-shot	
Black Condor		#1–12	Jun 1992 – May 1993		
Black Hammer/Justice League: Hammer of Justice!		#1–5	Jul 2019 – Nov 2019	Limited series; co-published with Dark Horse Comics	
Black Lightning	vol. 1	#1–11	Apr 1977 – Sep/Oct 1978		
Black Lightning	vol. 2	#1–13	Feb 1995 – Feb 1996		
Black Lightning	vol. 3	#1–5	Jan 2025 – May 2025		
Black Lightning: Cold Dead Hands		#1–6	Jan 2018 – Jun 2018	Limited series	
Black Lightning/Hong Kong Phooey Special		#1	Jul 2018	One-shot	
Black Lightning: Year One		#1–6	Jan 2009 – Mar 2009	Limited series	
Black Magic		#1–9	Oct/Nov 1973 – Apr/May 1975		
Black Manta		#1–6	Nov 2021 – Apr 2022	Limited series	
Black Mask: Year of The Villain		#1	Oct 2019	One-shot	
Black Orchid		#1–3	Nov 1988 – Jan 1989	Limited series	
The Black Racer and Shilo Norman Special		#1	Oct 2017	One-shot	
Blackest Night		#1–8	Jul 2009 – Feb 2010	Limited series	
Blackest Night	Batman	#1–3	Aug 2009 – Oct 2009	Limited series	
Blackest Night	JSA	#1–3	Feb 2010 – Apr 2010	Limited series	
Blackest Night	Superman	#1–3	Aug 2009 – Oct 2009	Limited series	
Blackest Night	Tales of the Corps	#1–3	Jul 2009	Limited series	
Blackest Night	The Flash	#1–3	Feb 2010 – Apr 2010	Limited series	
Blackest Night	Titans	#1–3	Aug 2009 – Oct 2009	Limited series	
Blackest Night	Wonder Woman	#1–3	Feb 2010 – Apr 2010	Limited series	
Blackhawk	vol. 1	#108–243	Jan 1957 – Oct/Nov 1968	Formerly published by Quality Comics	
Blackhawk	vol. 1	#244–250	Jan/Feb 1976 – Jan/Feb 1977	Formerly published by Quality Comics	
Blackhawk	vol. 1	#251–273	Oct 1982 – Nov 1984	Formerly published by Quality Comics	
Blackhawk	vol. 2	#1–3	Mar 1988 – May 1988	Limited series	
Blackhawk	vol. 3	#1–16	Mar 1989 – Aug 1990		
Blackhawk	vol. 3	Annual #1	1989		
Blackhawk Special		#1	1992	One-shot	
Blackhawks		#1–8	Nov 2011 – Jun 2012		
Blackmask		#1–3	Nov 1993 – Mar 1994	Limited series	
Blasters Special		#1	May 1989	One-shot	
Blitzkrieg		#1–5	Jan/Feb 1976 – Sep/Oct 1976		
Blood of the Demon		#1–17	May 2005 – Sep 2006		
Blood Pack		#1–4	Mar 1995 – Jun 1995	Limited series	
Blood Syndicate: Season One		#1–6	Jul 2022 – Jan 2023	Limited series	
Bloodbath		#1–2	Dec 1993	Limited series	
Bloodhound		#1–10	Sep 2004 – Jun 2005		
Bloodlines		#1–6	Jun 2016 – Nov 2016	Limited series	
Blue & Gold		#1–8	Sep 2021 – Jun 2022	Limited series	
Blue Beetle	vol. 1	#1–24	Jun 1986 – May 1988	Previously published by other companies	
Blue Beetle	vol. 2	#1–36	May 2006 – Feb 2009		
Blue Beetle	vol. 3	#0–16	Nov 2011 – Mar 2013	Issue #0 was published between #12 and #13	
Blue Beetle	vol. 4	#1–18	Nov 2016 – Apr 2018		
Blue Beetle	vol. 4	Rebirth #1	Oct 2016		
Blue Beetle	vol. 5	#1–11	Nov 2023 – Oct 2024		
Blue Beetle: Graduation Day		#1–6	Jan 2023 – Jun 2023	Limited series	
Blue Devil		#1–31	Jun 1984 – Dec 1986		
Blue Devil		Annual #1	1985		
Bob, the Galactic Bum		#1–4	Feb 1995 – Jun 1995	Limited series	
Body Doubles		#1–4	Oct 1999 – Jan 2000	Limited series	
Body Doubles (Villains)		#1	Feb 1998	One-shot; part of the New Year's Evil series	
Bomba, the Jungle Boy		#1–7	Sep/Oct 1967 – Sep/Oct 1968		
Bombshells United		#1–19	Nov 2017 – Aug 2018		
The Book of Fate		#1–12	Feb 1997 – Jan 1998		
Books of Magic	vol. 1	#1–4	Jan 1991 – Jun 1991	Limited series	
Books of Magic	vol. 3	#14–23	Jan 2020 – Nov 2020	Published under the DC Black Label imprint; vol. 2 & issues #1–13 published under the Vertigo imprint	
Booster Gold	vol. 1	#1–25	Feb 1986 – Feb 1988		
Booster Gold	vol. 2	#1–47	Oct 2007 – Oct 2011		
Booster Gold	vol. 2	#0	Apr 2008	Zero Hour tie-in	
Booster Gold	vol. 2	#1,000,000	Sep 2008	DC One Million tie-in	
Booster Gold	vol. 2	Futures End #1	Nov 2014		
Booster Gold/The Flintstones Special		#1	May 2017	One-shot	
Boy Commandos	vol. 1	#1–36	Winter 1942/1943 – Nov/Dec 1949		
Boy Commandos	vol. 2	#1–2	Sep/Oct 1973 – Nov/Dec 1973		
The Boy Wonder		#1–5	Jul 2024 – Nov 2024	Limited series; published under the DC Black Label imprint	
The Brave and the Bold	vol. 1	#1–200	Aug/Sep 1955 – Jul 1983		
The Brave and the Bold	vol. 2	#1–6	Dec 1991 – Jun 1992	Limited series	
The Brave and the Bold	vol. 3	#1–35	Apr 2007 – Aug 2010		
The Brave and the Bold 80-Page Giant		#1	2001	One-shot	
The Brave and the Bold: Batman and Wonder Woman		#1–6	Apr 2018 – Sep 2018	Limited series	
Breach		#1–11	Mar 2005 – Jan 2006		
Breathtaker		#1–4	Jul 1990 – Oct 1990	Limited series	
Brightest Day		#1–26	Apr 2010 – Apr 2011	Bi-weekly, alternating with Justice League: Generation Lost	
Brightest Day	The Atom Special	#1	Sep 2010	One-shot	
Brightest Day Aftermath: The Search for Swamp Thing		#1–3	Aug 2011 – Oct 2011	Limited series	
Brother Power, the Geek		#1–2	Sep/Oct 1968 – Nov/Dec 1968		
Bruce Wayne: Not Super			2023	Graphic novel	
Bruce Wayne: Not Super – The Bat-Catastrophe			2026	Graphic novel	
Bruce Wayne: The Road Home	Batgirl	#1	Dec 2010	One-shot	
Bruce Wayne: The Road Home	Batman and Robin	#1	Dec 2010	One-shot	
Bruce Wayne: The Road Home	Catwoman	#1	Dec 2010	One-shot	
Bruce Wayne: The Road Home	Commissioner Gordon	#1	Dec 2010	One-shot	
Bruce Wayne: The Road Home	Oracle	#1	Dec 2010	One-shot	
Bruce Wayne: The Road Home	Outsiders	#1	Dec 2010	One-shot	
Bruce Wayne: The Road Home	Ra's Al Ghul	#1	Dec 2010	One-shot	
Bruce Wayne: The Road Home	Red Robin	#1	Dec 2010	One-shot	
Bug! The Adventures of Forager		#1–6	Jul 2017 – Feb 2018	Limited series; published under the Young Animal pop-up imprint	
Bugs Bunny		#1–3	Jun 1990 – Aug 1990	Limited series	
The Bugs Bunny Monthly		#1–3	Oct 1990 – Dec 1990		
The Butcher		#1–5	May 1990 – Sep 1990	Limited series	
Buzzy		#1–77	Winter 1944/1945 – Oct 1958		

== See also ==
- List of current DC Comics publications
- List of DC Comics reprint collections
- List of DC Archive Editions
- List of DC Comics imprint publications
- List of Elseworlds publications
- List of DC Comics characters

DC Comics has also published titles under other imprints (chiefly Vertigo, Milestone, WildStorm, ABC, Paradox Press, Amalgam, DC Focus, Johnny DC, Tangent, CMX, Impact, Helix, Minx, and Homage) along with a number of reprints.
