= Batman: Gotham Knights – Gilded City =

Limited comic book series published by DC Comics

- Cover page of Batman: Gotham Knights – Gilded City #1 (October 2022).

Publication information
- Publisher: DC Comics
- Schedule: Monthly
- Format: Limited series
- Genre: Superhero
- Publication date: October 25, 2022 – March 28, 2023
- No. of issues: 6
- Main character(s): Batgirl; Batman; Nightwing; Red Hood; Robin

Creative team
- Written by: Evan Narcisse
- Artist: ABEL

Batman: Gotham Knights – Gilded City is an American comic book published by DC Comics. The six-issue limited series was written by Evan Narcisse and illustrated by ABEL, and serves as a tie-in and prequel to the video game Gotham Knights, the premise revolving around Batman's final case before his death. The first issue was published on October 25, 2022.

== Premise ==
A mysterious virus has infected Gotham City, turning its citizens into rabid, yellow-irised maniacs driven to looting, theft, and bursts of anger. As Batman and the Gotham Knights—consisting of his protégés Nightwing, Batgirl, Robin, and Red Hood—try to contain and stop the outbreak, their search for more information about the virus leads them to uncover the story of the Runaway, an early Gotham vigilante who dealt with a similar outbreak in the 1800s.

== Publication ==
The six-issue miniseries was written by Evan Narcisse and illustrated by ABEL. The comic was first announced at San Diego Comic-Con in July 2022, three months ahead of the release of Gotham Knights, to which it serves as a prequel. Batman: Gotham Knights – Gilded City began publishing on October 25 the same year, four days after the game was released. In addition to the United States, the series was published simultaneously in Brazil, France, Germany, Italy, Mexico, and Spain. It was distributed as both individual issues and a hardcover collected edition, the latter of which was released in all aforementioned territories, as well as Poland, on July 25, 2023. Each issue came with a code for a Gotham Knights in-game item, as well as a seventh item given to those who purchased all six issues of the series.

=== Issues ===
Issue	Publication date	Ref.
No. 1	October 25, 2022	
No. 2	November 22, 2022	
No. 3	December 27, 2022	
No. 4	January 24, 2023	
No. 5	February 28, 2023	
No. 6	March 28, 2023	

== See also ==
- List of prequels
