= Vermillion (Helix) =

- Cover to Vermillion No. 1: Starlight Drive, art by Michael Kaluta

Publication information
- Publisher: Helix (DC Comics imprint)
- Schedule: Monthly
- Format: Ongoing series
- Publication date: 1996 – 1997
- No. of issues: 12
- Main character: Jonathan Cave

Creative team
- Created by: Lucius Shepard
- Written by: Lucius Shepard
- Artist(s): Al Davison; John Totleben; Gary Erskine
- Inker: Angus McKie
- Colorist: Kim DeMulder
- Editor: Stuart Moore

Vermillion is a dark science fantasy comic book series set in an eponymous city located in an imagined far future or alternate reality. The series was conceived and written by science fiction author Lucius Shepard as part of the short-lived DC Comics imprint Helix. The title was cancelled after a one-year publication run shortly before the Helix imprint was itself cancelled by DC and its remaining titles shifted across to the Vertigo line.

== Plot ==
The series narrates the tale of its major protagonist Jonathan Cave, to a man named Brother Fry. It describes the last days of a previous universe whose destruction in turn spawned the never-ending dystopian city-universe of Vermillion:

...the sight of Vermillion by night oppressed me. Streets so long no man could travel their length in a thousand lifetimes. A universe that was literally a single city. My home yet not my home. As old as time by most measures, yet new to me. I would never grow used to it.

— Jonathan Cave, Vermillion #1, p.3, Oct. 96

The series included two notable story arcs during its brief print run: Starlight Drive (issues #1–7) and Lord Iron & Lady Manganese (issues #9–11).
