= Gemini Blood =

- Cover to Gemini Blood, art by Tommy Lee Edwards

Publication information
- Publisher: Helix (DC Comics imprint)
- Schedule: Monthly
- Format: Ongoing series
- Publication date: 1996 - 1997
- No. of issues: 9
- Main character(s): Nick; Laura; Gillian; Rolk; Russell

Creative team
- Created by: Christopher Hinz
- Written by: Christopher Hinz
- Artist: Tommy Lee Edwards
- Colorist: Melissa Edwards

Gemini Blood is a nine-issue comic book series published by American company DC Comics under its Helix imprint. Dated from September 1996 to May 1997, the series was written by Christopher Hinz and illustrated by Tommy Lee Edwards. It was placed in the same universe as Hinz's Paratwa Saga, featured in his trilogy of novels consisting of Liege-Killer (1987), Ash Ock (1989) and The Paratwa (1991). Set in the mid 21st century, the world of Gemini Blood was one of increasing global chaos. The plot of the comic followed a group of four adventurers as they attempted to combat the Paratwa, a race of genetically engineered assassins who share a psychic bond between two bodies.
