= Christopher Hinz =

American writer

Christopher Hinz (born March 10, 1951) is an American writer best known for the Paratwa science fiction trilogy. Hinz has also written comic books for DC Comics and Marvel Comics. He won the Compton Crook Award in 1988 for his novel Liege-Killer, the first book in his "Paratwa Trilogy".

As a comic books writer, Hinz created the nine-issue comic book series titled Gemini Blood, published under the Helix imprint of DC Comics. With illustrations from Tommy Lee Edwards, the comics deal with the same themes and with similar characters as the Paratwa Trilogy; it ran from 1996 to 1997. He also co-created and wrote the Dead Corps four-issue limited series for Helix, and a ten-issue story arc for Marvel's Blade which comprised Volume 2 of the series.

== Bibliography ==
=== Paratwa ===
- Binary Storm (2016) [standalone prequel]
- Liege-Killer (1987) [book 1 of the trilogy]
- Ash Ock (1989) [book 2 of the trilogy]
- The Paratwa (1991) [book 3 of the trilogy]

=== Other ===
- Anachronisms (1988)
- Spartan X (2012)
- Starship Alchemon (2019)
- Refraction (2022)
