= Jason Temujin Minor =

American comic book artist (born 1971)

- Born: September 1, 1971 (age 54)
- Website: http://www.jason-minor.com

Jason Temujin Minor (born 1971) is an American artist, writer, and comic book artist.

== Biography ==
=== Artist ===
Minor has worked in the graphic arts field for over twenty years. He attended the Joe Kubert School of Cartoon and Graphic Art in 1990 and started his own freelance studio, called Baraka Studios, in 1998. His portfolio covers a wide range of media, including; comic books, 3D graphics, book covers, web design, ad design, Illustration, and fine art.

=== Comic books ===
As a comic book artist, Minor is best known for his work on The Books of Magic, Buffy the Vampire Slayer, Teenage Mutant Ninja Turtles, Animal Man, and "Deadpool". He has also worked on such titles such as Batman, X-Men, Terror Inc., Shadowman, Vampirella, Spider-Man, The Punisher, Excalibur, and the Eisner Award-winning anthology Big Book of Urban Legends. In 1997, Minor co-created the science fiction mini-series BrainBanx with writer Elaine Lee for the Helix imprint of DC Comics.

=== Video games ===
In 2000, Minor transitioned from a 2D comic and graphic artist to a 3D computer game artist. He worked for a short time at Kinesoft before going to work for Sony Online Entertainment on their MMO game Star Wars Galaxies. He was an environment and character artist on the initial launch of the game and became the lead character artist on the Rage of the Wookiees expansion. He took over as art director of Star Wars Galaxies: Live in 2004. In 2006, Minor joined the game company BioWare, working on their MMO Star Wars: The Old Republic as the lead character artist.

=== Writing ===
Minor won an award for his short story, "A Dance in the Woods". He contributed a short story and several illustrations to the horror flash fiction anthology "Flashes of Fear". He is also a member of the San Gabriel Writer's League and writes a monthly, serialized story called "Chapter Play".

== Bibliography ==
=== Comics ===
- 1992 The Punisher #72 – Inker
- 1993 Terror Inc. #9–13 – inker
- 1993 Hawkman #11 – inker
- 1993 Excalibur Annual #2 – inker
- 1993 Cable #8 – inker
- 1993 Black Orchid Annual 1 – inker
- 1993 Hardware #8 – inker
- 1993 Teenage Mutant Ninja Turtles #58,61 – inker
- 1993–94 Teenage Mutant Ninja Turtles (color) #1–3 – inker
- 1994 Saint Sinner #5 – inker
- 1994 Excalibur #76 – inker
- 1994 Showcase '94 #7 – inker
- 1994 Savage Sword of Conan #227 – inker
- 1994 X-Men: The Wedding Album – inker
- 1994 Vengeance of Vampirella #4 – inker
- 1994 Deadpool: Sins of the Past #1–2 – inker
- 1994 Mantra #13 – inker
- 1994 Nightman #5 – inker
- 1994 Big Book of Urban Legends – artist
- 1994 Big Book of Freaks – artist
- 1995 Vampirella Strikes #3 – inker
- 1995 Godwheel #2–3 – inker
- 1995 Dream Team – Inker
- 1995 Animal Man #80–89 – inker
- 1995 X-Men Poster Magazine #3 – inker
- 1995 Codename: Strykeforce #14 – inker
- 1996–97 BrainBanx #1–6 – co-creator, artist
- 1998 Slingers #8,12 – inker
- 1998–99 The Books of Magic #46–54, 57–58, 70, annual 3 – finishes
- 1998 Resident Evil #4 – inker
- 1998 Shadowman #16–18 – inker
- 1998 Tales of the Witchblade #6 – inker
- 1998 Buffy the Vampire Slayer #16 – inker
- 1998 Buffy The Vampire Slayer #20 – penciler
- 1999 Batman: No Man's Land Gallery – artist
- 1999 Batman: Shadow of the Bat #89 – penciler
- 1999 Deadpool TPB – inker
- 1999 JSA Secret Files – artist
- 2000 Spider-Man vs. The Punisher – inker
- 2009 The Vertigo Encyclopedia – artist

=== Video games ===
- Star Wars Galaxies (2001) – Character artist
- Star Wars: The Old Republic (2006) – Character artist
