= Bloody Mary (Helix) =

- Cover to Bloody Mary #1, art by Carlos Ezquerra.

Publication information
- Publisher: Helix / DC Comics
- Schedule: Monthly
- Format: Miniseries
- Genre: Science fiction
- Publication date: Vol. 1: October 1996 - January 1997; Vol. 2: September - December 1997
- No. of issues: Vol. 1: 4 Vol. 2: 4

Creative team
- Written by: Garth Ennis
- Artist: Carlos Ezquerra
- Letterer: Annie Parkhouse
- Colorist(s): Vol. 1: Matt Hollingsworth; Vol. 2: Chris Chuckry
- Editor(s): Stuart Moore; Julie Rottenberg

Collected editions
- Bloody Mary, Bloody Mary: ISBN 1-4012-0725-1

Bloody Mary is the title of a series of science fiction comic book limited series written by Garth Ennis and illustrated by Carlos Ezquerra. All of the series were published as part of DC Comics' Helix imprint. It is also the name of the protagonist of the series.

== Publication history ==
The first series, Bloody Mary, ran for four issues from October 1996 to January 1997. The second series, Bloody Mary: Lady Liberty, also ran for four issues, from September to December 1997.

== Plot ==
Both series are set in the year 2012, after many years of war between a fascistic (mainland) Europe versus the United States and England.

In the first series, the main character, Corporal "Bloody Mary" Malone, a highly trained American commando, is sent to Europe, along with a team and her friend, "the Major", to retrieve the Blood Dragon, a parasitic organism developed in a Himalayan research lab which makes its host almost immortal. The Blood Dragon is now in the hands of Mary's former sergeant, Anderton, who steals it to sell for the best price.

The second series, Bloody Mary: Lady Liberty deals with Achilles Seagal, a religious maniac who has generated a bigot cult which counts half a million people to take over New York City and is slaughtering thousands of innocent people. Mary Malone is sent, along with a team and the Major, to assassinate him.

== Collected editions ==
The two series were collected into a single trade paperback Bloody Mary, Bloody Mary (ISBN 1-40120-725-1) in 2005.
