= Time Breakers =

- Cover to Time Breakers No. 2 - Mind out of Time, art by Chris Weston

Publication information
- Publisher: Helix (DC Comics imprint)
- Schedule: Monthly
- Format: Limited series
- Publication date: 1997
- No. of issues: 5
- Main character(s): Angela Attenborough; Leo Kharshovsky; Aithon, Luis, Nkacha

Creative team
- Created by: Rachel Pollack and Chris Weston
- Written by: Rachel Pollack
- Artist: Chris Weston
- Editor: Stuart Moore

Time Breakers is a five-issue comic book limited series published in 1997 under the short-lived DC Comics imprint Helix. It was written by Rachel Pollack and illustrated by Chris Weston.

Time Breakers narrates the exploits of a self-recruited team of time travellers dedicated to the creation of time paradoxes in the belief that this is the only method to prevent the destruction of time itself. Contrary to the performance of most other Helix titles, Time Breakers gained a loyal readership yet the overall poor sales figures of the Helix line dissuaded DC from renewing the title for an additional series.

== Plot synopsis ==
In the late 1950s, Angela Attenborough is a young bored housewife living a comfortable but tedious existence married to Phillip, her doctor husband. Three strangely dressed personages appear to her in the wood one day and confer upon her a rare disk capable of altering probability waves through the power of thought alone. Following a series of misadventures over the next several years, Angela rids herself of Phillip and embarks upon a career as a Parisian jewel thief. When a heist goes awry she is rescued and transported out of time itself by the same motley garbed crew she encountered previously, including a woman she identifies as a future version of herself.

Angela finds herself in Paradox Pond the sanctuary and headquarters of her saviours, a disparate group which call themselves Time Breakers and include Leo Kharshovsky her future soul-mate. It is explained to Angela that the raison d'être of the Breakers is to unite various episodes in history through deliberate acts of paradox which thereby strengthen life and the very nature of reality. Indeed all members of the team have been recruited from random periods of human history through acts of paradoxical intervention orchestrated by elder versions of themselves.

Opposed to the Breakers are the Heroes of Knowledge or Knowers, whose actions in resisting paradox foment the destruction of time and the release of all souls from 'the prison of life'. This destruction manifests itself in the form of a time storm which has been sweeping from the far future backwards in time eradicating all history back as far as the twenty-first century and which is shortly to converge on the present.

As the story arc proceeds, the Breakers seek to influence various incidents in human history such as the collaboration in Cambridge in the early part of the twentieth century between Srinivasa Ramanujan and G. H. Hardy and to keep one step ahead of the Knowers. The narrative concludes with the implementation of a meta-paradox which gives meaning to the origins of the two factions of time travellers and simultaneously both destroys yet preserves the continuity of history itself.

== Themes ==
In her introduction to the title Pollack stated that her motivation in writing the series was to exploit a new angle on the time travel cliché as a literary device. Rather than to challenge the logic behind the traditional time travel paradoxes, a ground which had been comprehensively covered by the likes of Heinlein and others, she seeks to show that a robust self-perpetuating paradox can give meaning to the structure of the universe itself. She therefore sought to compose a narrative where the creation rather than the prevention of paradox would be the goal of the leading protagonists.

== Collections ==
Time Breakers was collected in an Italian edition in 2017. Weston is crowdfunding an English edition, as of 2024.
