= Cyberella =

Science fiction comic

- Cover to Cyberella #2 by Don Cameron

Publication information
- Publisher: Helix (DC Comics imprint)
- Schedule: Monthly
- Format: Ongoing series
- Genre: Cyberpunk
- Publication date: 1996 – 1997
- No. of issues: 12
- Main character: Cyberella / Sunny Winston

Creative team
- Created by: Don Cameron and Howard Chaykin
- Written by: Howard Chaykin
- Artist: Don Cameron
- Colorist: Nathan Eyring
- Editor: Stuart Moore

Cyberella is an American comic book series first published in 1996 as part of the short-lived DC Comics imprint Helix. The title was initially scheduled to be an ongoing monthly, but, owing to poor sales figures for both it and the Helix line generally, was cancelled after twelve issues in 1997. Written by Howard Chaykin and drawn by Don Cameron the title has been variously described as a techno-satire and a populist cyberpunk dystopia.

== Plot synopsis ==
Sunny Winston is an 'ordinary citizen' who exhibits aberrant behaviour living in the insular consumer-driven society of a near-future Earth.

Karoshi/Macrocorp has designed a program to keep the human masses under its sway by exploiting their affinity with popular culture. This program is based on "Lil Ella", a cartoon character created by Kelton Mosby the founder of Karoshi/Macrocorp, based on Ella Fiscus, a child star who died in a factory accident. Following Mosby's death, Karoshi/Macrocorp falls under the sway of Bronson Travis and his descendants including Bronson Travis III, the one time lover of Sunny Winston.

The Karoshi/Macrocorp plan backfires and leads to the merging of the persona of Sunny Winston with the 'Lil Ella program. The end-product of this fusion is 'Cyberella' a being imbued with various 'super-powers' (including the ability to meld her mind with others) and who sets about undermining the ambitions of Karoshi/Macrocorp.

The events narrated by the comic take place in Slangeliego, "the capital of the twenty first century [and] the greatest city in the world", a megalopolis stretching the length of the west coastline of the North American continent, from Vancouver in Canada southwards down to Tijuana in Mexico.
