= Angus McKie =

British artist

- Born: July 1951 (age 75) Newcastle upon Tyne, England
- Areas: Cartoonist, Artist, Inker, Letterer, Colourist
- Notable works: So Beautiful and So Dangerous; The Dome: Ground Zero
- Awards: Eisner Award for Best Coloring, 1995

Angus McKie (born July 1951 in Newcastle upon Tyne) is a British comics creator who has worked as an artist, inker, writer and colourist. McKie was an early employer of computer-generated artwork. He has worked frequently with fellow British creators Dave Gibbons and Bryan Talbot.

He is best known as a science fiction illustrator whose work appeared on the covers of numerous science fiction paperback novels in the mid-1970s and 1980s, as well as in Stewart Cowley's Terran Trade Authority series of illustrated books. McKie's illustrations often present highly detailed spacecraft against vividly colored backgrounds and high-tech constructions, examples of which include So Beautiful and So Dangerous (1979) and The Dome: Ground Zero (1998), as well as the cover for the 1978 Vangelis album Hypothesis. (Note: The cover artwork for Hypothesis was originally created by McKie for a series of novels by SF author Brian Stableford, featuring the spacecraft Hooded Swan, mentioned in the books.)

Like Peter Elson, Tony Roberts, Chris Foss, and some other artists of the period, he influenced an entire generation of science fiction illustrators and concept artists. This influence may be seen in the look of the Homeworld video game.

== Career ==
McKie's earliest professional comics work was published in late 1970s/early '80s British anthologies like Brainstorm Comix, House of Hammer, and Pssst!.

McKie's 64-page graphic novel So Beautiful and So Dangerous (Heavy Metal/Simon & Schuster, 1979) follows the surreal and whimsical adventures of various characters, including a green alien named Sisyphus, a robot named Titan, and a Woody Allen lookalike, as they navigate a universe filled with bizarre civilizations and philosophical musings. The story blends humor and existential reflections, presenting a journey that explores the nature of existence and humanity's place in the cosmos. Key components of the story were later adapted into a segment in the 1981 film Heavy Metal. (Following a complaint by French comics artist Jean-Claude Mézières, McKie later admitted that several panels from So Beautiful and So Dangerous were copied from Mézières' Ambassador of the Shadows from the Valérian and Laureline series.)

In 1993 McKie wrote and drew (via computer generation) the first two parts of a science fiction comic entitled "The Blue Lily", based on Dave Weir's short story, about "a robot private eye with a line in rumination on the human and robot condition." Issues #1-2 were published by Dark Horse Comics. As of 2011, McKie was reportedly working on the last two parts of the work in his spare time (but by 2024 they had still not appeared in print).

McKie's pioneering work on The Dome: Ground Zero (Helix/DC Comics, 1998) employed some illustrative techniques that were considered novel at the time, involving a computer-driven process from start to finish. After writer Dave Gibbons finished the script, he produced page layouts using Adobe Photoshop which he then provided to McKie, who combined them with the letters and panel borders using Macromedia FreeHand. Painted 3D images were rendered and then opened using Photoshop for reworking and finally pasted onto the letters and panel borders. The result was computer-generated characters that were considered (at the time) more lifelike and preserved the recognizable biomechanical attributes of human anatomy without sacrificing texture and detail.
