= Dead Corps =

1998 comic book mini-series

- Cover to Dead Corps - Suckers of Mars #1, art by Steve Pugh

Publication information
- Publisher: Helix (DC Comics imprint)
- Schedule: Monthly
- Format: Miniseries
- Genre: Science fiction
- Publication date: 1998
- No. of issues: 4
- Main character: CJ Rataan

Creative team
- Created by: Christopher Hinz
- Written by: Christopher Hinz
- Artist: Steve Pugh
- Colorist: Patricia Mulvihill
- Editor: Stuart Moore

Dead Corps, subtitled Dead Corpse, is a four-issue comic book miniseries published in 1998 by Helix, a short-lived imprint of American company DC Comics. Written by Christopher Hinz and illustrated by Steve Pugh, the story is set in a near-future earth where medical technology has opened the possibility for the re-animation of human beings and the dead play an active but sometimes unwilling role in everyday society. The title met with little success commercially as it was published by Helix some time after the cancellation of the entire imprint had been announced.

== Plot synopsis ==
The year is 2101 and thirty three years have passed since the first successful brain tissue remodulation and body reanimation of a human being. Vitals, ordinary living human beings, share their lives with Expireds, an underclass of once dead people who have been restored to life to perform a variety of specialist but unwanted tasks. Apart from the pallor of their skin and the putrid chemical unction which they are forced to consume as a food-substitute, the dead are otherwise indistinguishable from ordinary functioning human beings.

Detective Sergeant CJ Rataan is the senior officer in a squad of the Paladin Dead Corps, an elite but poorly respected team of mixed expired and vital police officers based out of North Nome, Alaska.

CJ himself is an Expired, having been murdered and then revived several years prior to the narrative owing to his role thwarting the operations of a gangland syndicate of body-poachers and killing the leader's brother. As the tale develops, CJ and his rag-tag crew of Expireds (Detectives Cicatriz and 'Pappy') and Vitals (Detective Eldo Kway and Corporal Meep) are engaged to investigate the circumstances surrounding CJ's death, but in addition to robbing him of his first life, CJ has been targeted for PR.
