= The Black Lamb =

Limited comic-book series that ran for six issues

- Cover to The Black Lamb #1, art by Tim Truman

Publication information
- Publisher: Helix (DC Comics imprint)
- Schedule: Monthly
- Format: Limited series
- Publication date: November 1996 - April 1997
- No. of issues: 6
- Main character: The Black Lamb

Creative team
- Created by: Tim Truman
- Written by: Tim Truman
- Artist: Tim Truman
- Penciller: Tim Truman
- Inker: Tim Truman
- Colorist: Sam Parsons

The Black Lamb is an American six-issue comic book limited series that takes place in a science fantasy setting. Published in late 1996 and early 1997 by DC Comics as part of their now defunct Helix imprint, the series was written and drawn by Tim Truman.

Set in an unnamed near future city that has a cyberpunk appearance and feel, The Black Lamb stars a character named Diarmaid Donn, a centuries old vampire who is originally from medieval Ireland. Donn, known as the Black Lamb, is a figure authorized by the supernatural elements of the city, known collectively as the Tribes of the Night, as judge, jury and executioner in matters pertaining to the protection of the Tribes of the Night. In 2008 Truman declared:

He was designed to be a "Shadow" for the monster-class -- a defender of the things that go bump in the night. Even monsters need heroes, after all.

Told mostly from the point of view of the title character, a significant amount of time also finds the story told from the point of view of a supporting character named Commissioner Damn. Damn is a police officer who has the ability to sense supernatural beings.

Although some members of the Tribes of the Night live above ground, the majority reside, hidden in secret, in a huge maze of caverns beneath the city.

In the back of issue #1, Tim Truman wrote a column titled "Out for Blood" in which he noted the influences and inspirations for The Black Lamb. Among the named sources are James Whale's 1931 motion picture version of Frankenstein, the stories featuring Fu Manchu and The Iron Dream by science fiction writer, Norman Spinrad.

== Publication history ==
The six issues of The Black Lamb are broken up into four semi-related stories. Issue #1 (dated November 1996) is a stand alone story which introduces the Black Lamb and Commissioner Damn. Issues #2 (dated December 1996) and #3 (dated January 1997) tell a story in which the Black Lamb must deal with a war between two tribes of werewolves. Issue #3 also tells the Black Lamb's origin. Issue #4 (dated February 1997) deals with the first meeting between the Black Lamb and Commissioner Damn as they deal with a group of hunters (known in this universe as specialists) who have come to the city. Issues #5 (dated March 1997) and #6 (dated April 1997) finish up the series as the Black Lamb recruits Commissioner Damn and a number of other supporting characters who appeared in the other issues to stop a plot launched by Dracula.

Tim Truman was unsatisfied with a new printing process used on The Black Lamb that he felt hurt the series in its original printing:

The artwork for the original comic series was hurt by a new process that DC's production team was experimenting with at the time-- basically, the original black plates were shot for xeroxed photocopies! Argh. As a result, a lot of the care that I put into the linework didn't make it to the printed page.

In 2008, he authorized the free online release of the series by Comicmix.com.

== Plot summary ==
=== Back story ===
In medieval Ireland, Diarmaid Donn lives with his wife (a normal human) and children. Like other vampires of his world, he was born a vampire with a mortal lifespan just slightly longer than a human. His son was born a human, but his daughter was born a vampire like him.

When their small farm is attacked by Vikings Donn's wife and son are killed. Recognizing them as vampires the attackers take Donn and his daughter as prisoners. Donn's daughter is tortured to death, her last words being a request to her father to drink her blood to give him strength so that he may survive. It is an act that will make him immortal, but will also make him a social outcast among the Tribes of the Night. He does so, becomes an immortal and kills his jailers.

=== Issue #1 ===
The Black Lamb deals with a group of three specialists who have come to the city to hunt. He kills two, but brings the leader to stand trial before the Court of Monsters. The two deaths attract the attention of Commissioner Damn who begins to investigate the activities of the Tribes of the Night.

=== Issues #2-3 ===
The Black Lamb learns of a war that has developed between two Werewolf clans. On one side, the family of Niceros, an old friend of the Black Lamb's. On the other side, the forces led by Lykaon, an ancient werewolf who disguises himself as human and owns and runs his own corporation. Seeking to end the hostilities which are attracting the sort of attention which can be dangerous to the Tribes of the Night, the Black Lamb breaks into Lykaon Towers in an attempt to kill Lykaon. Once inside, he learns that the whole war was a plot by Lykaon to lure him into a trap.

Seeking to kill the Black Lamb, drink his blood and become immortal, Lykaon captures the Black Lamb and places him in an iron maiden. Thinking the Black Lamb dead, Lykaon opens the iron maiden but is incorrect is this assumption. After hallucinating about the events leading to his immortality, the Black Lamb breaks free and kills Lykaon.

=== Issue #4 ===
A group of dangerous specialists led by twins named Renfield and Helsing come to the city. The Black Lamb and Commissioner Damn meet for the first time when they both seek to stop this group's activities.

=== Issues #5-6 ===
Dracula and his daughter, the Blood Contessa come to the city seeking to rule it. To stop them the Black Lamb recruits Commissioner Damn and a number of other minor character who have appeared in other issues in a bid to stop them. This group locates Dracula's lair in the caverns beneath the city and begins their plans of attack.

== Sources ==
- The Black Lamb at the Grand Comics Database
- The Black Lamb at the Comic Book DB (archived from the original)
