= The Dome: Ground Zero =

Novel by Dave Gibbons

- Cover to The Dome: Ground Zero, art by Angus McKie

Publication information
- Publisher: Helix, an imprint of DC Comics
- Schedule: Monthly
- Format: One-shot
- Publication date: 1998
- No. of issues: 1
- Main character(s): Adam Berg; Elizabeth Lopez

Creative team
- Created by: Dave Gibbons; Angus McKie
- Written by: Dave Gibbons
- Artist: Angus McKie
- Editor: Stuart Moore

The Dome: Ground Zero is a one-shot graphic novel published in 1998 under the short-lived DC Comics imprint Helix. Written and laid out by Dave Gibbons and illustrated by Angus McKie, The Dome used computer-rendered graphics to augment the latter's illustrations. Despite suffering by its association with the poorly received Helix line, The Dome won praise both for the high quality of its art and for its well-constructed storyline set in the south Pacific waters of a recognizably contemporary Earth environment, replete with the conflicting ideologies of US techno-military forces and Christian fundamentalist eco-warriors.

== Plot synopsis ==
The US military has successfully test-detonated a Quantum Bomb, an unpredictable new weapon, on a disused island deep in the Pacific ocean despite intervention from Elias Walsh and his hang-gliding congregation of activist ecological protestors. Cities around the Pacific Rim are soon damaged by a variety of seemingly natural phenomena. It becomes apparent to observing military forces that the Quantum Bomb has triggered fallout of a most unexpected kind - a gigantic reflective hemisphere, some ten-miles across and growing, has projected out of the ocean to cover ground zero at the site of the detonation.

Adam Berg, a geologist responsible for surveying the blast-site prior to detonation and Lieutenant Elizabeth Lopez are despatched with a team of marines to investigate the interior of the dome, which itself is discovered to be not solid but rather a field of energy. Inside it they find the original island has spontaneously terraformed itself into a greenhouse-like environment occupied by the hostile remnants of an ancient alien robotic civilisation. Berg and Lopez encounter both the fanatical Elias Walsh and the unbalanced Major Henderson, a survivor of the initial expeditionary force sent by the military. They must resolve the unworldly forces which have been brought into play inside of twenty-four hours, after which time the island has been scheduled for destruction by The Pentagon by conventional nuclear weapons.

== Artwork ==
As part of the creative process for The Dome, Angus McKie employed some illustrative techniques which were considered novel at the time, involving a computer-driven process from start to finish. After Gibbons finished the script he produced page layouts using Photoshop which he then provided to McKie who combined them with the letters and panel borders using Freehand. Painted 3D images were rendered and then opened using Photoshop for reworking and finally pasted onto the letters and panel borders. The result was to produce computer generated characters which were considered (at the time) more lifelike and preserved the recognizable biomechanical attributes of human anatomy without sacrificing texture and detail.
