= Liege-Killer =

1987 novel by Christopher Hinz

- Author: Christopher Hinz
- Cover artist: Bill Sienkiewicz
- Language: English
- Series: Paratwa Trilogy
- Release number: 1
- Genre: Science fiction
- Set in: Near future
- Publisher: St. Martin's Press
- Publication date: February 1, 1987
- Publication place: United States
- Media type: Print (hardcover)
- Pages: 458
- Awards: Compton Crook Award (1988)
- ISBN: 978-0312000653
- Followed by: Ash Ock
- Website: www.christopherhinz.com

Liege Killer is a science fiction novel by American writer Christopher Hinz. The book and its sequels Ash Ock and The Paratwa are set in human colonies in orbit around a desolated post-apocalyptic Earth.

The antagonists of the books are the Paratwa, a new species resulting from experimentation on human embryos in the near future. They are a single consciousness occupying a pair of telepathically linked bodies. The Paratwa are highly skilled warriors but look like normal people; the only way to identify a Paratwa match is by inflicting strong pain upon one of them and observing the reaction in the other.

The books follow the activities of humans and Paratwa as these old enemies are reunited more than a century after the Earth's apocalypse, during which humans had believed the Paratwa were extinct.

The novel won the Compton Crook Award in 1988.

In 2013, Liege-Killer was adapted into a graphic novel, Binary, also written by Chris Hinz, and illustrated by Jon Proctor.

== Sequels ==
- Ash Ock (1989)
- The Paratwa (1991)

There is also a prequel novel called Binary Storm written by Hintz in 2016
