= List of DC imprint reprint collections =

This is a list of DC Comics imprint reprint collections including trade paperbacks, hardcovers, and other special format collections. DC Comics is one of the largest comic book and graphic novel publishers in North America. They have published comics under a number of different imprints and corporate names. The collections on this page include all series, mini-series, limited series, and graphic novels published under the imprints All-Star, Johnny DC, Tangent, and those Amalgam Comics published by DC.

== All-Star ==
Title	Vol.	Material collected	Format	Publication date	ISBN
All Star Batman & Robin, the Boy Wonder	1	All Star Batman & Robin, the Boy Wonder #1–9	HC	June 2008	978-1401216818
All Star Batman & Robin, the Boy Wonder	1	All Star Batman & Robin, the Boy Wonder #1–9	TP	June 2009	978-1401220082
All-Star Superman	1	All-Star Superman #1–6	HC	April 2007	978-1401209148
All-Star Superman	1	All-Star Superman #1–6	TP	August 2008	978-1401211028
All-Star Superman	2	All-Star Superman #7–12	HC	February 2009	978-1401218379
All-Star Superman	2	All-Star Superman #7–12	TP	February 2010	978-1401218607
All-Star Superman		All-Star Superman #1–12	TP	October 2011	978-1401232054

== Amalgam Comics ==
Title	Vol.	Material collected	Format	Publication date	ISBN
The Amalgam Age of Comics: The DC Comics Collection	1	Amazon #1; Assassins #1; Doctor Strangefate #1; JLX #1; Legends of the Dark Claw #1; Super-Soldier #1	TP	September 1996	978-1563892950
Return to the Amalgam Age of Comics: The DC Comics Collection	2	Bat-Thing #1; Dark Claw Adventures #1; Generation Hex #1; JLX Unleashed #1; Lobo the Duck #1; Super-Soldier: Man of War #1	TP	October 1997	978-1563893827

== Johnny DC ==
Some collected editions, while reprinting comics published under the Johnny DC imprint, were not published under the imprint.

Title	Vol.	Vol. title	Material collected	Format	Publication date	ISBN
The Batman Strikes!	1	Crime Time	The Batman Strikes! #1–5	TP	May 2005	978-1401205096
The Batman Strikes!	2	In Darkest Night	The Batman Strikes! #6–10	TP	October 2005	978-1401205102
The Batman Strikes!	3	Duty Calls	The Batman Strikes! #11–14, 16–18	TP	September 2007	978-1401215484
Batman: The Brave and the Bold	1		Batman: The Brave and the Bold #1–6	TP	January 2010	978-1401226503
Billy Batson and the Magic of Shazam!	2		Billy Batson and the Magic of Shazam! #1–6	TP	May 2010	978-1401222482
Bugs Bunny	1	What's Up Doc?		TP	June 2005	978-1401205164
Cartoon Network Block Party!	1	Get Down!		TP	July 2005	978-1401205171
Cartoon Network Block Party!	2	Read All About It!		TP	September 2005	978-1401205188
Cartoon Network Block Party!	3	Can You Dig It?		TP	June 2006	978-1401210120
Cartoon Network Block Party!	4	Blast Off!		TP	June 2006	978-1401210137
Daffy Duck	1	You're Despicable!		TP	June 2005	978-1401205157
Justice League Unlimited	1	United They Stand	Justice League Unlimited #1–5	TP	May 2005	978-1401205126
Justice League Unlimited	2	World's Greatest Heroes	Justice League Unlimited #6–10	TP	April 2006	978-1401210144
Justice League Unlimited	3	Champions of Justice	Justice League Unlimited #11–15	TP	April 2006	978-1401210151
Justice League Unlimited	4	The Ties That Bind	Justice League Unlimited #16–22	TP	April 2008	978-1401216917
Justice League Unlimited	5	Heroes	Justice League Unlimited #23–29	TP	April 2009	978-1401222024
Justice League Unlimited		Jam Packed Action		TP	September 2005	978-1401206871
The Legion of Super-Heroes in the 31st Century	1	Tomorrow's Heroes	The Legion of Super-Heroes in the 31st Century #1–6		March 2008	978-1401216689
Scooby-Doo	1	You Meddling Kids!	Scooby-Doo #1–5	TP	November 2003	978-1401201777
Scooby-Doo	2	Ruh-Roh!	Scooby-Doo #6–10	TP	November 2003	978-1401201784
Scooby-Doo	3	All Wrapped Up!	Scooby-Doo #11–15	TP	February 2005	978-1401205133
Scooby-Doo	4	The Big Squeeze!	Scooby-Doo #16–20	TP	February 2005	978-1401205140
Scooby-Doo	5	Surf's Up!	Scooby-Doo #21–25	TP	February 2006	978-1401209360
Scooby-Doo	6	Space Fright	Scooby-Doo #26–30	TP	February 2006	978-1401209377
Super Friends	1	For Justice	Super Friends #1–7	TP	March 2009	978-1401221560
Super Friends	2	Calling All Super Friends	Super Friends #8–14	TP	July 2009	978-1401222895
Supergirl: Cosmic Adventures in the 8th Grade	1		Supergirl: Cosmic Adventures in the 8th Grade #1–6	TP	December 2009	978-1401225063
Teen Titans		Jam Packed Action		TP	October 2005	978-1401209025
Teen Titans Go!	1	Truth, Justice, Pizza!	Teen Titans Go! #1–5	TP	October 2004	978-1401203337
Teen Titans Go!	2	Heroes on Patrol!	Teen Titans Go! #6–10	TP	October 2004	978-1401203344
Teen Titans Go!	3	Bring It On!	Teen Titans Go! #11–15	TP	July 2005	978-1401205119
Teen Titans Go!	4	Ready for Action!	Teen Titans Go! #16–20	TP	July 2006	978-1401209858
Teen Titans Go!	5	On the Move!	Teen Titans Go! #21–25	TP	August 2006	978-1401209865
Tiny Titans	1	Welcome to the Treehouse	Tiny Titans #1–6	TP	February 2009	978-1401220785
Tiny Titans	2	Adventures in Awesomeness	Tiny Titans #7–12	TP	May 2009	978-1401223281
Tiny Titans	3	Sidekickin' It	Tiny Titans #13–18	TP	February 2010	978-1401226534
Tiny Titans	4	The First Rule of Pet Club...	Tiny Titans #19–25	TP	September 2010	978-1401228927
Tiny Titans	5	Field Trippin'	Tiny Titans #26–32	TP	May 2011	978-1401231736
Tiny Titans	6	The Treehouse and Beyond!	Tiny Titans #33–38	TP	December 2011	978-1401233105
Tiny Titans	7	Growing Up Tiny!	Tiny Titans #39–44	TP	June 2012	978-1401235253

== Tangent ==
Tangent Comics was a title used for two fifth-week events. The following collections include the Tangent Comics one-shots from 1997 and 1998.

Title	Vol.	Material collected	Format	Publication date	ISBN
Tangent Comics	1	The Atom #1; Metal Men #1; Green Lantern #1; The Flash #1; Sea Devils #1	TP	August 2007	978-1401215309
Tangent Comics	2	The Joker #1; Nightwing #1; Secret Six #1; Doom Patrol #1; The Batman #1	TP	January 2008	978-1401216382
Tangent Comics	3	The Superman #1; Wonder Woman #1; Nightwing: Night Force #1; The Joker's Wild! #1; The Trials of the Flash #1; Tales of the Green Lantern #1; Powergirl #1; JLA #1	TP	June 2008	978-1401218065
