= BrainBanx =

Comic book series

- Cover to BrainBanx: Down upon the Darkness #1, art by Temujin

Publication information
- Publisher: Helix (DC Comics imprint)
- Schedule: Monthly
- Format: Limited series
- Publication date: 1997
- No. of issues: 6
- Main character(s): Anna Elysian; Ellis Shepherd

Creative team
- Created by: Elaine Lee and Jason Temujin Minor
- Written by: Elaine Lee
- Artist: Jason Temujin Minor
- Colorist: Tatjana Wood
- Editor: Stuart Moore

BrainBanx is a six-issue comic book limited series published in 1997 as part of the short-lived DC Comics imprint, Helix. Written by Elaine Lee and featuring artwork by Jason Temujin Minor, the title narrates the tale of the red-headed Anna Elysian, a telepathic intelligence operative working undercover in a distant future world.

== Plot synopsis ==
Anna is a 'Mount' which means that she is an agent who shares her body and her consciousness with one of the corporeal occupants ('volunteers') of the BrainBanx (or 'pool'), a series of sophisticated life support tanks administered by the galactic government. In Anna's case, she is joined with Ellis Shepherd (or 'Shep') a former employee of the Organic Ranching Corporation (ORC) who has fled his position upon discovering evidence of certain prohibited cross-breeding experiments that ORC had been performing with sheep.

As the series unfolds, Anna uncovers illegal plans to grow human brains in the bodies of animals and must also reconcile her emerging feelings for Shep with whom she shares her mind and body.

== Themes ==
In her foreword to the series, Elaine Lee described her wish to focus on human relationships in the title:

...Science fiction is at its best when it offers us new ways to look at our problems. It is silliest when it offers too many (or too simple solutions). Then it is simply an allegory..... or worse propaganda..... My very favourite thing is the relationship between men and women, and putting one of each into the same mind with no means of escape, is a way of exploring that relationship.

— Elaine Lee, BrainBanx #1, p.31, Mar. 1997
