= Evan Narcisse =

American writer and journalist

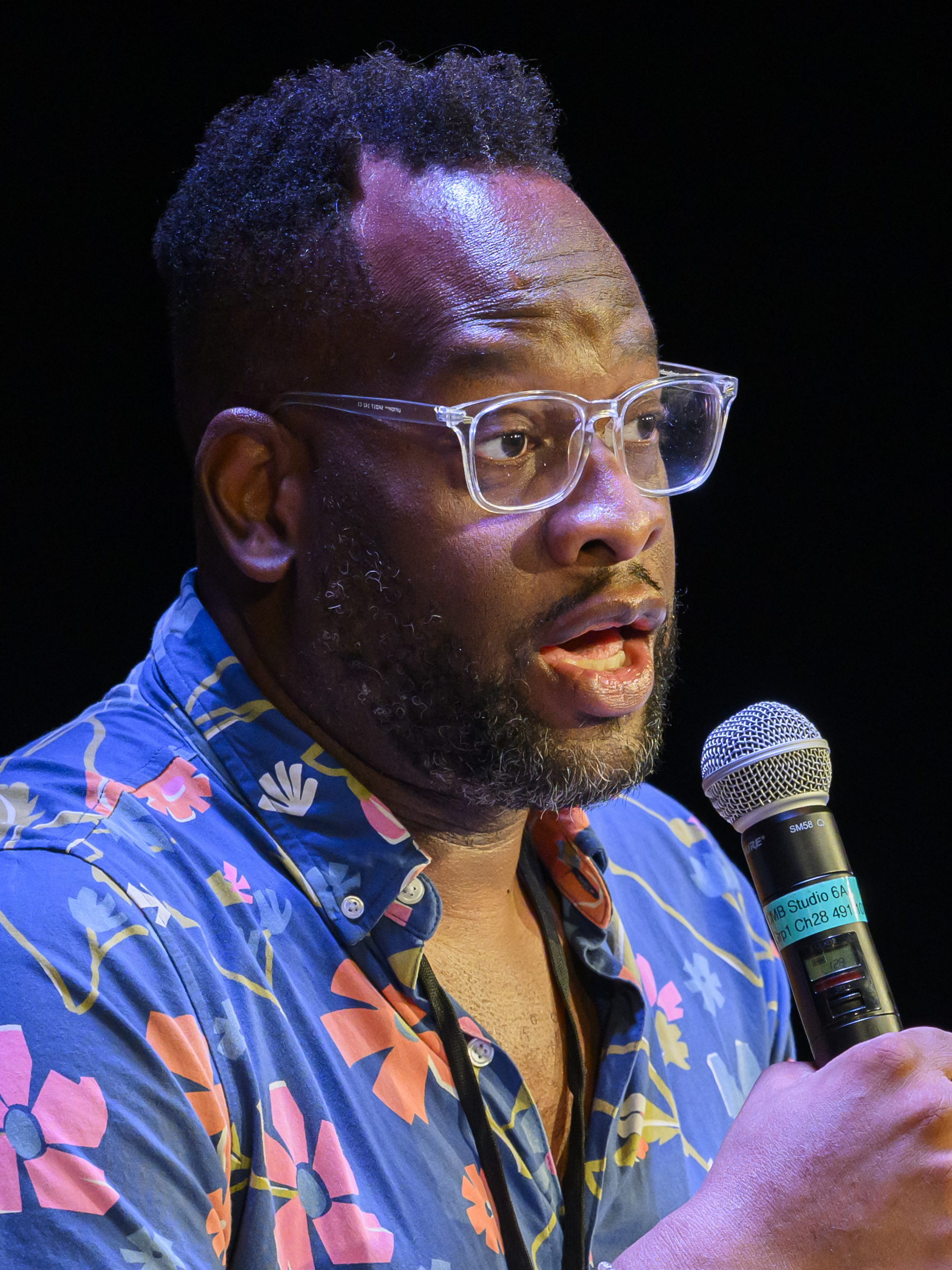
Narcisse in 2024

Evan Narcisse is an American comic book writer, journalist, and video game narrative designer. Narcisse began his working career as a journalist who has reported on video games for several media outlets, such as The Atlantic, The New York Times, Time, Kotaku, io9, and Polygon. As a comic book writer, Narcisse has authored multiple titles which feature the Marvel Comics superhero, Black Panther. Since 2018, Narcisse has been involved with designing or consulting on the narrative elements of several video games, including Insomniac Games' Spider-Man video game series, Marvel's Avengers, and Redfall.

== Career ==
=== Journalism ===
During the 2000s, Narcisse worked as a contributor and writer for several news outlets with a focus on the video game industry, such as Entertainment Weekly. In 2010, Narcisse authored several articles published by The Atlantic. Narcisse joined video game blog Kotaku in October 2011, where he worked for nearly five years. After leaving Kotaku in June 2016, Narcisse tenured as a senior staff writer at io9, a sister site to Kotaku, where he wrote about comics and comic reviews. Other media outlets Narcisse has previously written for included The New York Times, Time, IGN, GameSpot, and Rolling Stone. Narcisse has also appeared as an expert guest on CNN and NPR.

=== Comic books ===
One of Narcisse's interviews with Ta-Nehisi Coates about the latter's work on the Black Panther series caught the attention of Coates' editor at Marvel, who asked him to extend an invitation to Narcisse to collaborate on future Black Panther stories. Narcisse's debut comic book title is Rise of the Black Panther, a 2018 limited series he co-wrote with Coates. The comic series follow the early years of the main character, T'Challa as well as his family members and Wakanda, the fictional African nation he rules as its king. The premise of Rise of the Black Panther was pitched by Narcisse, as he wanted to explore what makes T'Challa "a man, a king and an African superhero in a world filled with blond-haired superpatriots and golden-locked gods".

Narcisse's other comic book work for titles published by Marvel Comics include Marvel's Voices #1 and Last Annihilation: Wakanda #1. Narcisse is also the co-writer of WWE The New Day: Power of Positivity, a limited comic series starring members of the professional wrestling stable, The New Day. He is the co-writer, along with national security journalist Spencer Ackerman, of Waller vs. Wildstorm from DC Comics.

=== Video games ===
Narcisse's first work on a video game was for the 2018 title, Spider-Man, where he was responsible for writing a few lines of dialogue. He served as the narrative design consultant for 2020's Marvel's Spider-Man: Miles Morales, a standalone expansion to Spider-Man starring the character Miles Morales.

Narcisse served as a story consultant on War for Wakanda, a 2021 downloadable content (DLC) expansion for Marvel's Avengers which stars Black Panther. Narcisse is the writer of the 2021 freeware title Dot's Home developed and published by the Rise Home Stories Project, a media collective project which is intended to spread public awareness about housing policy and social justice issues in the United States. In June 2021, Narcisse announced that he is part of the development team behind the upcoming open-world co-op shooter title, Redfall.

=== Other works ===
Narcisse is a member of the writing staff of Gen:LOCK, an American adult animated science fiction streaming television series created by Gray Haddock and produced by Rooster Teeth, since July 2018.

== Personal life ==
Narcisse is the son of Haitian immigrants who moved to the United States in the late 1960s, and could understand Antillean Kreyol. Narcisse and his siblings were raised by their mother in a New York suburban neighborhood, which later underwent gentrification that further disadvantaged some marginalized residents. Narcisse was inspired from a young age by the political history of Haiti, which instilled an interest in writing about issues of race and representation throughout his professional career. Narcisse is a longtime fan of the Black Panther comic book series; his earliest memory of reading a Black Panther story was an issue of the 1970s reprint title Marvel Triple Action, where the superhero character was revealed to be a black man from a foreign country who is also culturally sophisticated. Narcisse was educated at New York University, and later taught a course on video game journalism at his alma mater. Narcisse relocated from New York City to Austin, Texas as of 2016.
