= Michael Moorcock's Multiverse =

Comic Book Series

- Cover to Michael Moorcock's Multiverse #1, art by Walt Simonson

Publication information
- Publisher: Helix, an imprint of DC Comics
- Schedule: Monthly
- Format: Limited series
- Publication date: 1997 - 1998
- No. of issues: 12
- Main character(s): I: Rose, Sam Oakenhurst, Jack Karaquazian, Michael Moorcock; II: Sir Seaton Begg, Rose von Bek, Dr Taffy Sinclair, Count Zodiac; III: Duke Elric, Rose

Creative team
- Created by: Michael Moorcock
- Written by: Michael Moorcock
- Artist(s): I: Walter Simonson; II: Mark Reeve; III: John Ridgway
- Colorist: Tatjana Wood
- Editor: Stuart Moore

Collected editions
- Michael Moorcock's Multiverse: ISBN 1-56389-516-1

Michael Moorcock's Multiverse is an American twelve-issue comic book limited series published in 1997 as a part of the short-lived DC Comics imprint Helix. It was later collected as a single edition graphic novel. Written by Michael Moorcock, each monthly issue contained a chapter from three separate storylines featuring distinct groups of characters lifted from Moorcock's sprawling Eternal Champion novels.

A different artist illustrated each story: Walter Simonson for Moonbeams and Roses, Mark Reeve for The Metatemporal Detective and John Ridgway for Duke Elric. Whilst each story depicted an independent series of events set across different locations and time-lines, by the conclusion of the title the three plot threads had converged in a logical manner centred on their mutual search for the Silverskin, an enigmatic underworld crime figure and recurring protagonist from Moorcock's novels.

Despite a positive reception in comparison with other Helix titles, critics remarked that the title was not the best introduction to Moorcock's work.

== Synopsis of plotlines ==
Each of the three tales is set within a distinct aspect of the multiverse that Moorcock has built up over four decades in his novels and short stories about the Eternal Champion:

...the Multiverse isn't a globe. Time isn't cyclic. There is no real linearity. The Multiverse is a tree root and branch, a living organism. A creature. Like me. Forever adapting and changing. Like us, made up of spheres, but it's not itself spherical. We've evolved beyond the merely spheroid, I hope......

The first tale, I: Moonbeams and Roses, is set in the Terminal Cafe, in present-day Biloxi, Mississippi where Jack Karaquazian indulges in meta-universal games of chance with an assortment of leading characters from the Moorcock novels, together with Moorcock himself, and later, artist Walter Simonson. Somewhat impenetrable, the story tracks the adventures of Rose, who originally appeared in the novel The Revenge of the Rose (1991) and Sam Oakenhurst, hero of Blood (1995) and subsequent novels as their progress towards Silverskin is manipulated at each turn by the unseen players of the Game.

II: The Metatemporal Detective is set in the inter-war period and follows Sir Seaton Begg and his off-sider Dr Taffy Sinclair from the eponymous novel sleuthing an array of crimes Sherlock Holmes-style, including the murder of Adolf Hitler's incestuous girlfriend and niece.

The final tale III: Duke Elric features the popular albino emperor Elric of Melniboné displaced from his fantastical world and transported to the Europe and the Middle East of 1000 AD. Here he pursues a quest to uncover certain artifacts which will allow him freedom to confront King Silverskin and to return to his home world.

The three plotlines converge in a single narrative in the final issue of the title, The Harmonies of Chaos (drawn by Walter Simonson) as Elric confronts the Silverskin and its connection to Moorcock's multiverse is revealed.

== Collected editions ==
- Michael Moorcock's Multiverse (by Michael Moorcock, DC Comics, 1999, 288 pages, ISBN 978-1-56389-516-6)
