= Helix (comics) =

Defunct imprint of DC Comics (1996–1998)

- Parent company: DC Comics (Warner Bros.)
- Founded: 1996
- Defunct: 1998
- Country of origin: United States
- Headquarters location: New York City
- Key people: Michael Moorcock; Lucius Shepard; Christopher Hinz; Howard Chaykin; Elaine Lee; Matt Howarth; Warren Ellis; Walt Simonson; Garth Ennis
- Publication types: Comic books
- Fiction genres: Science fiction, science fantasy

Helix was a short-lived science fiction and science fantasy imprint of DC Comics, launched in 1996 and discontinued in 1998. In early promotional materials prior to the release of the first title, the imprint was called Matrix instead of Helix; it was renamed because of the then-upcoming film The Matrix. It featured a handful of ongoing monthly series, several limited series, and one short graphic novel.

Despite the involvement of successful science fiction/fantasy novelists Michael Moorcock, Lucius Shepard and Christopher Hinz, and established comics creators Howard Chaykin, Elaine Lee, Matt Howarth, Warren Ellis, Walt Simonson, and Garth Ennis, sales of the comic books were low, and most of the ongoing titles were cancelled after 12 or fewer issues. Ellis' Transmetropolitan was switched to the Vertigo imprint, where it continued for several more years before reaching its planned conclusion. Ennis' Bloody Mary miniseries and Michael Moorcock's Multiverse were later collected in Vertigo-label paperbacks and Moeller's Sheva's War was released as a graphic novel paperback by Dark Horse.

Limited availability of the books in bookstores that already sold science fiction, resistance among science-fiction readers to serialized monthly publication, the lower visibility of the line's deliberately muted cover color palette, and the lack of interest in genre SF among regular patrons of comic-book stores were all cited by industry observers as factors in the imprint's demise.

== History ==
According to Stuart Moore, a former editor for Vertigo Comics in charge of overseeing the new Helix (formerly Matrix) line of comics, some of the proposed projects and series submitted did not thematically fit within the Vertigo line or other parts of the established DC Comics umbrella like Paradox Press. The line launched in July 1996 with the goal being to publish four ongoing series and two or three limited series at a time. The primary focus of the imprint was on creator owned science fiction titles with adult sensibilities that would still be accessible to younger readers.

== Helix titles ==
Book title	Issues	Writer	Artist(s)	Publication dates
The Black Lamb	6	Timothy Truman	Timothy Truman	November 1996 – April 1997
Bloody Mary (Note: A TPB collected edition was released in 2005 under the Vertigo imprint.)	4	Garth Ennis	Carlos Ezquerra	October 1996 – January 1997
Bloody Mary: Lady Liberty (Note: A TPB collected edition was released in 2005 under the Vertigo imprint.)	4	Garth Ennis	Carlos Ezquerra	September 1997 – December 1997
BrainBanx	6	Elaine Lee	Jason Temujin Minor	March 1997 – August 1997
Cyberella	12	Howard Chaykin	Don Cameron	September 1996 – August 1997
Dead Corps	4	Christopher Hinz	Steve Pugh	September 1998 – December 1998
The Dome: Ground Zero	1	Dave Gibbons	Angus McKie	1998
Gemini Blood	9	Christopher Hinz	Tommy Lee Edwards	September 1996 – May 1997
Michael Moorcock's Multiverse (Note: A TPB collected edition was released in 1999 under the Vertigo imprint.)	12	Michael Moorcock	Walt Simonson, Mark Reeve, John Ridgway	November 1997 – October 1998
Sheva's War (Note: A TPB collection - Iron Empires vol. 2: Sheva's War - was released in 2004 by Dark Horse Comics.)	5	Christopher Moeller	Christopher Moeller	October 1998 – February 1999
Star Crossed	3	Matt Howarth	Matt Howarth	Jun 1997 - Aug 1997
Time Breakers	5	Rachel Pollack	Chris Weston	January 1997 – May 1997
Transmetropolitan	60 (Note: Issues #1-12 published under the Helix imprint; issues #13-60 published under the Vertigo imprint.)	Warren Ellis	Darick Robertson	September 1997 – November 2002
Vermillion	12	Lucius Shepard	Al Davison, John Totleben, Gary Erskine	October 1996 – September 1997
