= List of DC Comics publications (C–F) =

DC Comics is one of the largest comic book publishers in North America. DC has published comic books under a number of different imprints and corporate names. This is a list of all series, mini-series, limited series, one-shots and graphic novels published under the imprints DC or AA, and published by National Periodical Publications, National Comics Publications, All-American Comics, Inc., National Allied Publications, Detective Comics, Inc., and related corporate names, as well as imprints publishing titles directly related to the DC Universe characters and continuity, such as Elseworlds and DC Black Label. The list does not include collected editions; trade paperbacks; digital comics; free, promotional giveaways; or magazines, nor does it include series from imprints mainly publishing titles that are separate from the DC Universe continuity, such as Vertigo or WildStorm; series published under those imprints that are related to the DC Universe continuity are noted, but not listed.

While generally the most recognizable name of a comic is printed on the cover, the cover title can be changed for a number of reasons. For example, Action Comics has frequently been listed as Action Comics featuring Superman or Superman in Action Comics, or even on occasion Supergirl in Action Comics. The official name, however, is found in the indicia, in small print inside the comics.

- List of DC Comics publications (A–B)
- List of DC Comics publications (G–J)
- List of DC Comics publications (K–O)
- List of DC Comics publications (P–S)
- List of DC Comics publications (T–Z)

== C ==
Title	Series	Issues	Dates	Notes	Reference
C.O.P.S.		#1–15	Aug 1988 – Aug 1989		
C.O.R.T.: Children of the Round Table		#1–6	Nov 2025 – Apr 2026	Limited series	
Camelot 3000		#1–12	Dec 1982 – Apr 1985	Limited series	
Caper		#1–12	Dec 2003 – Nov 2004	Limited series	
Capt. Storm		#1–18	May/Jun 1964 – Mar/Apr 1967		
Captain Action		#1–5	Oct/Nov 1968 – Jun/Jul 1969		
Captain Atom	vol. 1	#1–57	Mar 1987 – Sep 1991	Previous volumes published by Charlton	
Captain Atom	vol. 1	Annual #1–2	1988		
Captain Atom	vol. 2	#0–12	Nov 2011 – Nov 2012	Issue #0 was published after #12 as final issue of series	
Captain Carrot and His Amazing Zoo Crew		#1–20	Mar 1982 – Nov 1983		
Captain Carrot and the Final Ark		#1–3	Oct 2007 – Dec 2007	Limited series	
Cartoon Cartoons		#1–33	Mar 2001 – Oct 2004		
Cartoon Network Action Pack		#1–67	Jul 2006 – May 2012		
Cartoon Network Block Party		#1–59	Nov 2004 – Sep 2009		
Cartoon Network Presents		#1–24	Aug 1997 – Aug 1999		
Cartoon Network Starring		#1–18	Sep 1999 – Feb 2001		
Catwoman	vol. 1	#1–4	Feb 1989 – May 1989	Limited series	
Catwoman	vol. 2	#1–94	Aug 1993 – Jul 2001		
Catwoman	vol. 2	#0	Oct 1994	Zero Hour tie-in	
Catwoman	vol. 2	#1,000,000	Nov 1998	DC One Million tie-in	
Catwoman	vol. 2	Annual #1–4	1994 – 1997		
Catwoman	vol. 2	Plus #1	Nov 1997		
Catwoman	vol. 3	#1–82	Jan 2002 – Aug 2008		
Catwoman	vol. 3	#83	Mar 2010	Blackest Night tie-in	
Catwoman	vol. 4	#0–52	Sep 2011 – Jul 2016	Issue #0 was published between #12 and #13	
Catwoman	vol. 4	Annual #1–2	2013 – 2014		
Catwoman	vol. 4	Futures End #1	Nov 2014		
Catwoman	vol. 5	#1–	Sep 2018 – present		
Catwoman	vol. 5	Annual #1	2019		
Catwoman	vol. 5	2021 Annual	2021		
Catwoman 80th Anniversary 100-Page Super Spectacular		#1	Aug 2020	One-shot	
Catwoman Defiant			Aug 1992	One-shot; also known as Batman: Catwoman Defiant	
Catwoman: Election Night		#1	Jan 2017	One-shot	
Catwoman: Guardian of Gotham		#1–2	Aug 1999 – Sep 1999	Elseworlds limited series	
Catwoman: Lonely City		#1–4	Dec 2021 – Dec 2022	Limited series; published under the DC Black Label imprint	
Catwoman Secret Files and Origins		#1	Nov 2002	One-shot	
Catwoman: Selina's Big Score			2002	Graphic novel	
Catwoman: Soulstealer			2021	Graphic novel	
Catwoman: The Movie		#1	2004	One-shot movie adaptation	
Catwoman/Tweety and Sylvester		#1	Oct 2018	One-shot	
Catwoman: Uncovered		#1	Oct 2023	One-shot	
Catwoman/Vampirella: The Furies			Feb 1997	One-shot; co-published with Harris Comics	
Catwoman: When in Rome		#1–6	Sep 2004 – Jul 2005	Limited series	
Catwoman/Wildcat		#1–4	Aug 1998 – Nov 1998	Limited series	
Cave Carson Has a Cybernetic Eye		#1–12	Dec 2016 – Nov 2017	Limited series; published under the Young Animal pop-up imprint	
Cave Carson Has a Cybernetic Eye/Swamp Thing Special		#1	Apr 2018	One-shot; published under the Young Animal pop-up imprint	
Cave Carson Has an Interstellar Eye		#1–6	May 2018 – Oct 2018	Limited series; published under the Young Animal pop-up imprint	
Centurions		#1–4	Jun 1987 – Sep 1987	Limited series	
Chain Gang War		#1–12	Jul 1993 – Jun 1994		
Challenge of the Super Sons		#1–7	Jun 2021 – Dec 2021	Limited series	
Challengers of the Unknown	vol. 1	#1–77	Apr/May 1958 – Dec/Jan 1970/1971		
Challengers of the Unknown	vol. 1	#78–80	Feb 1973 – Jun 1973		
Challengers of the Unknown	vol. 1	#81–87	Jun/Jul 1977 – Jun/Jul 1978		
Challengers of the Unknown	vol. 2	#1–8	Mar 1991 – Oct 1991	Limited series	
Challengers of the Unknown	vol. 3	#1–18	Feb 1997 – Jul 1998		
Challengers of the Unknown	vol. 4	#1–6	Aug 2004 – Jan 2005	Limited series	
Challengers of the Unknown	vol. 5	#1–6	Feb 2025 – present	Limited series	
Champion Sports		#1–3	Oct/Nov 1973 – Feb/Mar 1974		
Chase		#1–9	Feb 1998 – Nov 1998		
Chase		#1,000,000	Nov 1998	DC One Million tie-in	
Checkmate	vol. 1	#1–33	Apr 1988 – Jan 1991		
Checkmate	vol. 2	#1–31	Jun 2006 – Oct 2008		
Checkmate	vol. 3	#1–6	Aug 2021 – Jan 2022	Limited series; originally titled Event Leviathan: Checkmate	
Cheetah and Cheshire Rob the Justice League		#1–6	Oct 2025 – Mar 2026	Limited series	
Christmas with the Super-Heroes		#1–2	1988 – 1989		
Chronos		#1–11	Mar 1998 – Feb 1999		
Chronos		#1,000,000	Nov 1998	DC One Million tie-in	
Cinder and Ashe		#1–4	May 1988 – Aug 1988	Limited series	
Cinnamon: El Ciclo		#1–5	Oct 2003 – Feb 2004	Limited series	
City Boy		#1–6	Jul 2023 – Jan 2024	Limited series	
Clark & Lex			2023	Graphic novel	
Clash		#1–3	1991	Limited series	
Claw the Unconquered		#1–9	May/Jun 1975 – Sep/Oct 1976		
Claw the Unconquered		#10–12	Apr/May 1978 – Aug/Sep 1978		
Clayface: Celebrity Dirt		#1–6	Sep 2026 – present	Limited series	
Collapser		#1–6	Sep 2019 – Feb 2020	Limited series; published under the Young Animal pop-up imprint	
Comic Cavalcade		#1–63	Winter 1942 – Jun 1954		
Congo Bill		#1–7	Aug/Sep 1954 – Aug/Sep 1955	See also Vertigo list	
Congorilla		#1–4	Nov 1992 – Feb 1993	Limited series	
Conjurors		#1–3	Apr 1999 – Jun 1999	Elseworlds limited series	
Connor Hawke: Dragon's Blood		#1–6	Jan 2007 – Jul 2007	Limited series	
Conqueror of the Barren Earth		#1–4	Feb 1985 – May 1985	Limited series	
Constantine		#1–23	May 2013 – May 2015		
Constantine		Futures End #1	Nov 2014		
Constantine: Distorted Illusions			2022	Graphic novel	
Constantine/Hellblazer Special Edition		#1	Dec 2014	One-shot	
Constantine: The Hellblazer		#1–13	Aug 2015 – Aug 2016		
Convergence		#0–8	Jun 2015 – Jul 2015	Weekly limited series	
Convergence	Action Comics	#1–2	Jun 2015 – Jul 2015	Limited series	
Convergence	Adventures of Superman	#1–2	Jun 2015 – Jul 2015	Limited series	
Convergence	Aquaman	#1–2	Jun 2015 – Jul 2015	Limited series	
Convergence	Atom	#1–2	Jun 2015 – Jul 2015	Limited series	
Convergence	Batgirl	#1–2	Jun 2015 – Jul 2015	Limited series	
Convergence	Batman and Robin	#1–2	Jun 2015 – Jul 2015	Limited series	
Convergence	Batman and the Outsiders	#1–2	Jun 2015 – Jul 2015	Limited series	
Convergence	Batman: Shadow of the Bat	#1–2	Jun 2015 – Jul 2015	Limited series	
Convergence	Blue Beetle	#1–2	Jun 2015 – Jul 2015	Limited series	
Convergence	Booster Gold	#1–2	Jun 2015 – Jul 2015	Limited series	
Convergence	Catwoman	#1–2	Jun 2015 – Jul 2015	Limited series	
Convergence	Crime Syndicate	#1–2	Jun 2015 – Jul 2015	Limited series	
Convergence	Detective Comics	#1–2	Jun 2015 – Jul 2015	Limited series	
Convergence	Flash	#1–2	Jun 2015 – Jul 2015	Limited series	
Convergence	Green Arrow	#1–2	Jun 2015 – Jul 2015	Limited series	
Convergence	Green Lantern/Parallax	#1–2	Jun 2015 – Jul 2015	Limited series	
Convergence	Green Lantern Corps	#1–2	Jun 2015 – Jul 2015	Limited series	
Convergence	Harley Quinn	#1–2	Jun 2015 – Jul 2015	Limited series	
Convergence	Hawkman	#1–2	Jun 2015 – Jul 2015	Limited series	
Convergence	Infinity Inc.	#1–2	Jun 2015 – Jul 2015	Limited series	
Convergence	Justice League	#1–2	Jun 2015 – Jul 2015	Limited series	
Convergence	Justice League International	#1–2	Jun 2015 – Jul 2015	Limited series	
Convergence	Justice League of America	#1–2	Jun 2015 – Jul 2015	Limited series	
Convergence	Justice Society of America	#1–2	Jun 2015 – Jul 2015	Limited series	
Convergence	New Teen Titans	#1–2	Jun 2015 – Jul 2015	Limited series	
Convergence	Nightwing/Oracle	#1–2	Jun 2015 – Jul 2015	Limited series	
Convergence	Plastic Man and the Freedom Fighters	#1–2	Jun 2015 – Jul 2015	Limited series	
Convergence	Shazam	#1–2	Jun 2015 – Jul 2015	Limited series	
Convergence	Speed Force	#1–2	Jun 2015 – Jul 2015	Limited series	
Convergence	Suicide Squad	#1–2	Jun 2015 – Jul 2015	Limited series	
Convergence	Superboy	#1–2	Jun 2015 – Jul 2015	Limited series	
Convergence	Superboy and the Legion of Super-Heroes	#1–2	Jun 2015 – Jul 2015	Limited series	
Convergence	Supergirl: Matrix	#1–2	Jun 2015 – Jul 2015	Limited series	
Convergence	Superman	#1–2	Jun 2015 – Jul 2015	Limited series	
Convergence	Superman: Man of Steel	#1–2	Jun 2015 – Jul 2015	Limited series	
Convergence	Swamp Thing	#1–2	Jun 2015 – Jul 2015	Limited series	
Convergence	The Question	#1–2	Jun 2015 – Jul 2015	Limited series	
Convergence	Titans	#1–2	Jun 2015 – Jul 2015	Limited series	
Convergence	Wonder Woman	#1–2	Jun 2015 – Jul 2015	Limited series	
Convergence	Worlds' Finest	#1–2	Jun 2015 – Jul 2015	Limited series	
Cool World	vol. 1	#1–4	Apr 1992 – Sep 1992	Limited series	
Cool World	vol. 2		1992	One-shot movie adaptation	
Cosmic Boy		#1–4	Dec 1986 – Mar 1987	Limited series	
Cosmic Odyssey		#1–4	Nov 1988 – Mar 1989	Limited series	
Countdown		#51–26	May 2007 – Nov 2007	Weekly series, counting backwards; becomes Countdown to Final Crisis	
Countdown: Arena		#1–4	Feb 2008	Weekly limited series	
Countdown Presents: Lord Havok and the Extremists		#1–6	Oct 2007 – Mar 2008	Limited series	
Countdown Presents: The Search for Ray Palmer	Crime Society	#1	Dec 2007	One-shot	
Countdown Presents: The Search for Ray Palmer	Gotham by Gaslight	#1	Jan 2008	One-shot	
Countdown Presents: The Search for Ray Palmer	Red Rain	#1	Jan 2008	One-shot	
Countdown Presents: The Search for Ray Palmer	Red Son	#1	Feb 2008	One-shot	
Countdown Presents: The Search for Ray Palmer	Superwoman/Batgirl	#1	Feb 2008	One-shot	
Countdown Presents: The Search for Ray Palmer	Wildstorm	#1	Nov 2007	One-shot	
Countdown Special	Eclipso	#1	May 2008	One-shot; reprints	
Countdown Special	Jimmy Olsen	#1	Jan 2008	One-shot; reprints	
Countdown Special	Kamandi	#1	Jun 2008	One-shot; reprints	
Countdown Special	OMAC	#1	Apr 2008	One-shot; reprints	
Countdown Special	The Atom	#1–2	Feb 2008	Limited series; reprints	
Countdown Special	The Flash	#1	Dec 2007	One-shot; reprints	
Countdown Special	The New Gods	#1	Mar 2008	One-shot; reprints	
Countdown to Adventure		#1–8	Oct 2007 – May 2008	Limited series	
Countdown to Final Crisis		#25–1	Nov 2007 – May 2008	Weekly series, counting backwards; formerly Countdown	
Countdown to Infinite Crisis		#1	Apr 2005	See DC Countdown	
Countdown to Mystery		#1–8	Nov 2007 – Jun 2008	Limited series	
Creature Commandos		#1–8	May 2000 – Dec 2000	Limited series	
The Creeper	vol. 1	#1–11	Dec 1997 – Nov 1998		
The Creeper	vol. 1	#1,000,000	Nov 1998	DC One Million tie-in	
The Creeper	vol. 2	#1–6	Oct 2006 – Mar 2007	Limited series	
Crime Bible: Five Lessons of Blood		#1–5	Dec 2007 – Apr 2008	Limited series	
Crime Syndicate		#1–6	May 2021 – Oct 2021	Limited series	
The Crimson Avenger		#1–4	Jun 1988 – Sep 1988	Limited series	
Crisis Aftermath	The Battle for Blüdhaven	#1–6	Jun 2006 – Sep 2006	Limited series	
Crisis Aftermath	The Spectre	#1–3	Jul 2006 – Sep 2006	Limited series	
Crisis on Infinite Earths		#1–12	Apr 1985 – Mar 1986	Limited series	
Crush & Lobo		#1–8	Aug 2021 – Mar 2022	Limited series	
The Curse of Brimstone		#1–12	Jun 2018 – May 2019		
The Curse of Brimstone		Annual #1	2019		
Cursed Comics Cavalcade		#1	Dec 2018	One-shot	
Cyborg	vol. 1	#1–12	Sep 2015 – Aug 2016		
Cyborg	vol. 2	#1–23	Nov 2016 – Aug 2018		
Cyborg	vol. 2	Rebirth #1	Nov 2016		
Cyborg	vol. 3	#1–6	Jul 2023 – Feb 2024	Limited series	

== D ==
Title	Series	Issues	Dates	Notes	Reference
Dale Evans Comics		#1–24	Sep/Oct 1948 – Jul/Aug 1952		
Damage	vol. 1	#1–20	Apr 1994 – Jan 1996		
Damage	vol. 1	#0	Oct 1994	Zero Hour tie-in	
Damage	vol. 2	#1–16	Mar 2018 – Jun 2019		
Damage	vol. 2	Annual #1	2018		
Damian: Son of Batman		#1–4	Dec 2013 – Mar 2014	Limited series	
Danger Street		#1–12	Feb 2023 – Feb 2024	Limited series; published under the DC Black Label imprint	
Danger Trail	vol. 1	#1–5	Jul/Aug 1950 – Mar/Apr 1951		
Danger Trail	vol. 2	#1–4	Apr 1993 – Jul 1993	Limited series	
Daphne Byrne		#1–6	Mar 2020 – Sep 2020	Limited series; published under the DC Black Label/Hill House Comics imprint	
Daredevil/Batman			1997	Elseworlds one-shot; co-published with Marvel	
The Daring New Adventures of Supergirl		#1–13	Nov 1982 – Nov 1983	Becomes Supergirl vol. 2	
Dark Claw Adventures		#1	Jun 1997	One-shot; published under the Amalgam Comics imprint in association with Marvel	
Dark Crisis: Big Bang		#1	Feb 2023	One-shot	
Dark Crisis on Infinite Earths		#1–7	Aug 2022 – Feb 2023	Limited series; originally titled Dark Crisis	
Dark Crisis: The Dark Army		#1	Jan 2023	One-shot	
Dark Crisis: The Deadly Green		#1	Dec 2022	One-shot	
Dark Crisis: War Zone		#1	Feb 2023	One-shot	
Dark Crisis: Worlds Without a Justice League	Batman	#1	Jan 2023	One-shot	
Dark Crisis: Worlds Without a Justice League	Green Arrow	#1	Dec 2022	One-shot	
Dark Crisis: Worlds Without a Justice League	Green Lantern	#1	Oct 2022	One-shot	
Dark Crisis: Worlds Without a Justice League	Superman	#1	Sep 2022	One-shot	
Dark Crisis: Worlds Without a Justice League	Wonder Woman	#1	Nov 2022	One-shot	
Dark Crisis: Young Justice		#1–6	Aug 2022 – Jan 2023	Limited series	
Dark Days	The Casting	#1	Sep 2017	One-shot; prelude to Dark Nights: Metal	
Dark Days	The Forge	#1	Aug 2017	One-shot; prelude to Dark Nights: Metal	
The Dark Knight III: The Master Race		#1–9	Jan 2016 – Jul 2017	Limited series	
Dark Knight Returns: The Golden Child		#1	Feb 2020	One-shot; published under the DC Black Label imprint	
The Dark Knight Returns: The Last Crusade		#1	Aug 2016	One-shot	
The Dark Knight Strikes Again		#1–3	Dec 2001 – Jul 2002	Limited series	
Dark Knights of Steel		#1–12	Jan 2022 – Oct 2023	Limited series	
Dark Knights of Steel	II	#1–12	Sep 2026 – present	Elseworlds limited series	
Dark Knights of Steel	Allwinter	#1–6	Sep 2024 – Feb 2025	Elseworlds limited series	
Dark Knights of Steel	Heir to the Sea	#1	Sep 2026	Elseworlds one-shot	
Dark Knights of Steel	Tales from the Three Kingdoms	#1	Nov 2022	One-shot	
Dark Knights of Steel	The Gathering Storm	#1	May 2022	One-shot; reprinting of Dark Knights of Steel #1–3	
Dark Knights Rising: The Wild Hunt		#1	Apr 2018	One-shot; Dark Nights: Metal tie-in	
Dark Mansion of Forbidden Love		#1–4	Sep/Oct 1971 – Mar/Apr 1972	Becomes Forbidden Tales of Dark Mansion	
Dark Nemesis (Villains)		#1	Feb 1998	One-shot; part of the New Year's Evil series	
Dark Nights: Death Metal		#1–7	Aug 2020 – Mar 2021	Limited series	
Dark Nights: Death Metal	Guidebook	#1	Oct 2020	One-shot	
Dark Nights: Death Metal	Infinite Hour Exxxtreme!	#1	Jan 2021	One-shot	
Dark Nights: Death Metal	Legends of the Dark Knights	#1	Oct 2020	One-shot	
Dark Nights: Death Metal	Multiverse's End	#1	Nov 2020	One-shot	
Dark Nights: Death Metal	Rise of the New God	#1	Dec 2020	One-shot	
Dark Nights: Death Metal	Robin King	#1	Dec 2020	One-shot	
Dark Nights: Death Metal	Speed Metal	#1	Nov 2020	One-shot	
Dark Nights: Death Metal	The Last 52: War of the Multiverses	#1	Feb 2021	One-shot	
Dark Nights: Death Metal	The Last Stories of the DC Universe	#1	Feb 2021	One-shot	
Dark Nights: Death Metal	The Multiverse Who Laughs	#1	Jan 2021	One-shot	
Dark Nights: Death Metal	The Secret Origin	#1	Feb 2021	One-shot	
Dark Nights: Death Metal	Trinity Crisis	#1	Nov 2020	One-shot	
Dark Nights: Metal		#1–6	Oct 2017 – May 2018	Limited series	
Dark Nights: The Batman Who Laughs		#1	Jan 2018	One-shot; Dark Nights: Metal tie-in	
The Darkness/Batman		#1	Aug 1999	One-shot; co-published with Top Cow Productions	
The Darkness/Superman		#1–2	Jan 2005 – Feb 2005	Limited series; co-published with Top Cow Productions	
Darkseid Special		#1	Oct 2017	One-shot	
Darkseid (Villains)		#1	Feb 1998	One-shot; part of the New Year's Evil series	
Darkseid vs. Galactus: The Hunger			1995	One-shot; co-published with Marvel	
Darkstars		#1–38	Oct 1992 – Jan 1996		
Darkstars		#0	Oct 1994	Zero Hour tie-in	
Dastardly and Muttley		#1–6	Nov 2017 – Apr 2018	Limited series	
Date with Debbi		#1–17, 18	Jan/Feb 1969 – Sep/Oct 1971; Oct/Nov 1972		
A Date with Judy		#1–79	Oct/Nov 1947 – Oct/Nov 1960		
Day of Judgment		#1–5	Nov 1999	Weekly limited series	
Day of Judgment		Secret Files #1	Nov 1999	One-shot	
Day of Vengeance		#1–6	Jun 2005 – Nov 2005	Limited series	
Day of Vengeance	Infinite Crisis Special	#1	Mar 2006	One-shot	
DC 100 Page Super Spectacular		#4–6	May 1971 – Nov 1971	Issues #7-13 are "dual-numbered" as giant-sized editions of existing titles	
DC 100 Page Super Spectacular		#DC-14–DC-22	Feb 1973 – Nov 1973		
DC 2000		#1–2	Jan 2000 – Feb 2000	Limited series	
DC All In Saga: Darkseid vs. the World		#1	Dec 2026	One-shot	
DC All In Special		#1	Dec 2024	One-shot	
DC Challenge		#1–12	Nov 1985 – Oct 1986	Limited series	
DC Comics Bombshells		#1–33	Oct 2015 – Oct 2017		
DC Comics Bombshells		Annual #1	Oct 2016		
DC Comics Presents (1978)		#1–97	Jul/Aug 1978 – Sep 1986		
DC Comics Presents (1978)		Annual #1–4	1982 – 1985		
DC Comics Presents (2004)	Batman	#1	Sep 2004	One-shot	
DC Comics Presents (2004)	Flash	#1	Oct 2004	One-shot	
DC Comics Presents (2004)	Green Lantern	#1	Sep 2004	One-shot	
DC Comics Presents (2004)	Hawkman	#1	Sep 2004	One-shot	
DC Comics Presents (2004)	Justice League of America	#1	Oct 2004	One-shot	
DC Comics Presents (2004)	Mystery in Space	#1	Sep 2004	One-shot	
DC Comics Presents (2004)	Superman	#1	Oct 2004	One-shot	
DC Comics Presents (2004)	The Atom	#1	Oct 2004	One-shot	
DC Countdown		#1	Apr 2005	One-shot; labeled Countdown to Infinite Crisis on cover and title page	
DC Cybernetic Summer		#1	Sep 2020	One-shot	
DC Festival of Heroes: The Asian Superhero Celebration		#1	Jul 2021	One-shot	
DC First	Batgirl/Joker	#1	Jul 2002	One-shot	
DC First	Flash/Superman	#1	Jul 2002	One-shot	
DC First	Green Lantern/Green Lantern	#1	Jul 2002	One-shot	
DC First	Superman/Lobo	#1	Jul 2002	One-shot	
DC Graphic Novel		#1–7	1983 – 1986		
DC Holiday Special '09		#1	Dec 2009	One-shot	
DC Holiday Special 2017		#1	Feb 2018	One-shot	
DC Horror Presents		#1–4	Dec 2024 – Mar 2025	Limited series; titled DC Horror Presents...	
DC Horror Presents	Creature Commandos	#1–6	Dec 2024 – Jun 2025	Limited series	
DC Horror Presents	Sgt. Rock vs. The Army of the Dead	#1–6	Nov 2022 – Apr 2023	Limited series	
DC Horror Presents	Soul Plumber	#1–6	Dec 2021 – May 2022	Limited series	
DC Horror Presents	The Conjuring: The Lover	#1–5	Aug 2021 – Dec 2021	Limited series	
DC House of Horror		#1	Dec 2017	One-shot	
DC Infinite Halloween Special		#1	Oct 2007	One-shot	
DC K.O.		#1–5	Dec 2025 – May 2026	Limited series	
DC K.O.	Boss Battle	#1	Apr 2026	One-shot	
DC K.O.	Green Lantern Galactic Slam	#1	Mar 2026	One-shot	
DC K.O.	Harley Quinn vs. Zatanna	#1	Feb 2026	One-shot	
DC K.O.	Knightfight	#1–4	Jan 2026 – Apr 2026	Limited series	
DC K.O.	Red Hood vs. Joker	#1	Feb 2026	One-shot; also known as DC K.O.: Red Hood vs. The Joker and DC K.O.: The Joker vs. Red Hood	
DC K.O.	Superman vs. Captain Atom	#1	Feb 2026	One-shot	
DC K.O.	The Kids Are All Fight Special	#1	Mar 2026	One-shot	
DC K.O.	Wonder Woman vs. Lobo	#1	Feb 2026	One-shot	
DC League of Super-Pets: The Great Mxy-Up			2022	Graphic novel	
DC Love is a Battlefield		#1	Apr 2021	One-shot	
DC/Marvel: All Access		#1–4	Dec 1996 – Feb 1997	Limited series; published in association with Marvel	
DC/Marvel: Batman/Deadpool		#1	Jan 2026	One-shot; co-published with Marvel	
DC/Marvel: Superman/Spider-Man		#1	May 2026	One-shot; co-published with Marvel	
DC: Mech		#1–6	Sep 2022 – Feb 2023	Limited series	
DC Nation		#0–6	Jul 2018 – Jan 2019		
DC Nation Super Spectacular		#1–2	Summer 2012 – Winter 2012		
DC Nuclear Winter Special		#1	Jan 2019	One-shot	
DC One Million		#1–4	Nov 1998	Limited series	
DC One Million	80-Page Giant	#1,000,000	Aug 1999	One-shot	
DC Power	2024	#1	Mar 2024	One-shot	
DC Power	A Celebration	#1	Mar 2023	One-shot	
DC Power	Rise of the Power Company	#1	Mar 2025	One-shot	
DC Pride		#1	Aug 2021	One-shot	
DC Pride	2022	#1	Aug 2022	One-shot	
DC Pride	2023	#1	Jul 2023	One-shot	
DC Pride	2024	#1	Jul 2024	One-shot	
DC Pride	2025	#1	Aug 2025	One-shot	
DC Pride	A Celebration of Rachel Pollack	#1	Aug 2024	One-shot	
DC Pride	Through the Years	#1	Aug 2023	One-shot	
DC Pride	Tim Drake Special	#1	Aug 2022	One-shot	
DC Pride	Uncovered	#1	Aug 2024	One-shot	
DC Rebirth Holiday Special		#1	Feb 2017	One-shot	
DC Retroactive: Batman	The '70s	#1	Sep 2011	One-shot	
DC Retroactive: Batman	The '80s	#1	Oct 2011	One-shot	
DC Retroactive: Batman	The '90s	#1	Oct 2011	One-shot	
DC Retroactive: Green Lantern	The '70s	#1	Sep 2011	One-shot	
DC Retroactive: Green Lantern	The '80s	#1	Oct 2011	One-shot	
DC Retroactive: Green Lantern	The '90s	#1	Oct 2011	One-shot	
DC Retroactive: JLA	The '70s	#1	Sep 2011	One-shot	
DC Retroactive: JLA	The '80s	#1	Oct 2011	One-shot	
DC Retroactive: JLA	The '90s	#1	Oct 2011	One-shot	
DC Retroactive: Superman	The '70s	#1	Sep 2011	One-shot	
DC Retroactive: Superman	The '80s	#1	Oct 2011	One-shot	
DC Retroactive: Superman	The '90s	#1	Oct 2011	One-shot	
DC Retroactive: The Flash	The '70s	#1	Sep 2011	One-shot	
DC Retroactive: The Flash	The '80s	#1	Oct 2011	One-shot	
DC Retroactive: The Flash	The '90s	#1	Oct 2011	One-shot	
DC Retroactive: Wonder Woman	The '70s	#1	Sep 2011	One-shot	
DC Retroactive: Wonder Woman	The '80s	#1	Oct 2011	One-shot	
DC Retroactive: Wonder Woman	The '90s	#1	Oct 2011	One-shot	
DC/RWBY		#1–7	Apr 2023 – Oct 2023	Limited series	
DC Silent Tales		#1	Jun 2023	One-shot	
DC Special		#1–15	Oct/Dec 1968 – Nov/Dec 1971		
DC Special		#16–29	Spring 1975 – Aug/Sep 1977		
DC Special Blue Ribbon Digest		#1–24	Mar/Apr 1980 – Aug 1982		
DC Special: Cyborg		#1–6	May 2008 – Dec 2008	Limited series	
DC Special: Raven		#1–5	May 2008 – Sep 2008	Limited series	
DC Special Series		#1–16	Sep 1977 – Fall 1978		
DC Special Series		#17–27	Aug 1979 – Fall 1981	#18–19, 23–24 are digest sized; #25–27 are tabloid sized	
DC Special: The Return of Donna Troy		#1–4	Aug 2005 – Oct 2005	Limited series	
DC Super Hero Girls	At Metropolis High		2019	Graphic Novel; published under the DC Zoom imprint	
DC Super Hero Girls	Date With Disaster		2018	Graphic novel	
DC Super Hero Girls	Finals Crisis		2016	Graphic novel	
DC Super Hero Girls	Ghosting		2021	Graphic novel	
DC Super Hero Girls	High School Reunion		2026	Graphic novel	
DC Super Hero Girls	Hits and Myths		2016	Graphic novel	
DC Super Hero Girls	Midterms		2020	Graphic novel	
DC Super Hero Girls	Out of the Bottle		2018	Graphic novel	
DC Super Hero Girls	Past Times at Super Hero High		2017	Graphic novel	
DC Super Hero Girls	Powerless		2020	Graphic novel	
DC Super Hero Girls	Search for Atlantis		2018	Graphic novel; published under the DC Zoom imprint	
DC Super Hero Girls	Spaced Out		2019	Graphic novel; published under the DC Zoom imprint	
DC Super Hero Girls	Summer Olympus		2017	Graphic novel	
DC Super Hero Girls	Weird Science		2020	Graphic novel	
DC Super Stars		#1–18	Mar 1976 – Winter 1978		
DC: The Doomed and The Damned		#1	Dec 2020	One-shot	
DC: The New Frontier		#1–6	Mar 2004 – Nov 2004	Limited series	
DC Universe		#0	Mar 2008	One-shot	
DC Universe: Decisions		#1–4	Nov 2008 – Feb 2009	Limited series	
DC Universe Holiday Bash		#1	1997	One-shot; also known as DCU Holiday Bash	
DC Universe: Last Will and Testament		#1	Aug 2008	One-shot	
DC Universe: Legacies		#1–10	Jul 2010 – Apr 2011	Limited series	
DC Universe Online: Legends		#1–26	Apr 2011 – May 2012	Based on DC Universe Online	
DC Universe Presents		#0–19	Nov 2011 – Jun 2013	Issue #0 was published between #12 and #13	
DC Universe: Rebirth		#1	Jul 2016	One-shot	
DC Universe Special	Justice League of America	#1	Jul 2008	One-shot	
DC Universe Special	Reign in Hell	#1	Aug 2008	One-shot	
DC Universe Special	Superman	#1	Jul 2008	One-shot	
DC Universe: Trinity		#1–2	Aug 1993 – Sep 1993	Limited series that bookended the "Trinity" storyline	
DC Universe vs. Masters of the Universe		#1–6	Nov 2013 – Nov 2014	Limited series	
DC vs. Marvel		#1, 4	Feb 1996; May 1996	Limited series; issues #2 & 3 published by Marvel as Marvel vs. DC	
DC vs. Vampires		#1–12	Dec 2021 – Feb 2023	Limited series	
DC vs. Vampires	All-Out War	#1–6	Sep 2022 – Feb 2023	Limited series	
DC vs. Vampires	Coffin Edition	#1	Sep 2022	One-shot; reprinting of DC vs. Vampires #1–3	
DC vs. Vampires	Crypt Edition	#1	Sep 2022	One-shot; reprinting of DC vs. Vampires #4–6	
DC vs. Vampires	Hunters	#1	Jul 2022	One-shot	
DC vs. Vampires	Killers	#1	Aug 2022	One-shot	
DC vs. Vampires	World War V	#1–12	Oct 2024 – Nov 2025	Elseworlds limited series	
DC vs. Vampires	World War V - Darkness and Light	#1	Apr 2025	Elseworlds one-shot	
DC W.I.P.	Absolute Batman	#1	Nov 2025	One-shot	
DC W.I.P.	All-Star Superman	#1	Sep 2025	One-shot	
DC W.I.P.	American Vampire	#1	Dec 2025	One-shot	
DC W.I.P.	Batman – The Dark Knight Returns	#1	Nov 2026	One-shot	
DC W.I.P.	Dark Nights Metal	#1	Apr 2026	One-shot	
DC W.I.P.	Supergirl – Woman of Tomorrow	#1	Sep 2026	One-shot	
DC W.I.P.	Watchmen	#1	Nov 2026	One-shot	
DC/WildStorm: DreamWar		#1–6	Apr 2008 – Sep 2008	Limited series; WildStorm crossover	
DC x AEW		#1–2	Apr 2026 – May 2026	Limited series	
DC x Sonic the Hedgehog		#1–5	May 2025 – Sep 2025	Limited series	
DC x Sonic the Hedgehog: Metal Legion		#1–5	Jul 2026 – Nov 2026	Limited series; also known as DC x Sonic the Hedgehog: The Metal Legion	
DC's Batman Smells, Robin Laid an Egg		#1	Feb 2025	One-shot	
DC's Beach Blanket Bad Guys Summer Special		#1	Sep 2018	One-shot	
DC's Crimes of Passion		#1	Apr 2020	One-shot	
DC's Ghouls Just Wanna Have Fun		#1	Dec 2023	One-shot	
DC's Grifter Got Run Over by a Reindeer		#1	Jan 2023	One-shot	
DC's Harley Quinn Romances		#1	Mar 2023	One-shot	
DC's Hawk-Girl Summer		#1	Sep 2026	One-shot	
DC's How to Lose a Guy Gardner in 10 Days		#1	Apr 2024	One-shot	
DC's I Know What You Did Last Crisis		#1	Dec 2024	One-shot	
DC's I Saw Ma Hunkel Kissing Santa Claus		#1	Jan 2026	One-shot	
DC's Kal-El-Fornia Love		#1	Sep 2025	One-shot	
DC's Legion of Bloom		#1	May 2023	One-shot	
DC's Lex and the City		#1	Mar 2025	One-shot	
DC's Misfits of Magic			2025	Graphic novel	
DC's Quoth the Raven... Whatever		#1	Dec 2026	One-shot	
DC's Saved by the Belle Reve		#1	Oct 2022	One-shot	
DC's Spring Breakout!		#1	Jun 2024	One-shot	
DC's Supergirl Next Door		#1	Mar 2026	One-shot	
DC’s Terrors Through Time		#1	Dec 2022	One-shot	
DC's 'Twas the 'Mite Before Christmas		#1	Feb 2024	One-shot	
DC's Very Merry Multiverse		#1	Feb 2021	One-shot	
DC's Year of The Villain Special		#1	Jul 2019	One-shot	
DC's Zatannic Panic!		#1	Dec 2025	One-shot	
DCeased		#1–6	Jul 2019 – Dec 2019	Limited series	
DCeased	A Good Day to Die	#1	Nov 2019	One-shot	
DCeased	Dead Planet	#1–7	Sep 2020 – Mar 2021	Limited series	
DCeased	The Unkillables	#1–3	Apr 2020 – Jul 2020	Limited series	
DCeased	War of the Undead Gods	#1–8	Oct 2022 – Jun 2023	Limited series	
DCU: Brave New World		#1	Aug 2006	One-shot	
DCU Halloween Special		#1	Dec 2008	One-shot	
DCU Halloween Special	'09	#1	Dec 2009	One-shot	
DCU Halloween Special	2010	#1	Dec 2010	One-shot	
DCU Heroes Secret Files		#1	1999	One-shot	
DCU Holiday Bash II			1998	One-shot	
DCU Holiday Bash III			Jan 1999	One-shot	
DCU Holiday Special		#1	Feb 2009	One-shot	
DCU Holiday Special	2010	#1	Feb 2011	One-shot	
DCU: Infinite Holiday Special		#1	Feb 2007	One-shot	
DCU Villains Secret Files		#1	Apr 1999	One-shot	
Dead Romeo		#1–6	Jun 2009 – Nov 2009	Limited series	
Deadman	vol. 1	#1–7	May 1985 – Nov 1985	Limited reprint series	
Deadman	vol. 2	#1–4	Mar 1986 – May 1986	Limited series	
Deadman	vol. 3	#1–9	Feb 2002 – Oct 2002	vol. 4 published by Vertigo	
Deadman	vol. 5	#1–6	Jan 2018 – Jun 2018	Limited series	
Deadman	vol. 6	#1–6	Aug 2026 – present	Limited series; titled The Deadman	
Deadman: Dark Mansion of Forbidden Love		#1–3	Dec 2016 – Apr 2017	Limited series	
Deadman: Dead Again		#1–5	Oct 2001	Weekly limited series	
Deadman: Exorcism		#1–2	Oct 1992 – Dec 1992	Limited series	
Deadman: Love After Death		#1–2	Dec 1989 – Jan 1990	Limited series	
Deadman Tells the Spooky Tales			2022	Graphic novel	
Deadshot	vol. 1	#1–4	Nov 1988 – Holiday 1988	Limited series	
Deadshot	vol. 2	#1–5	Feb 2005 – Jun 2005	Limited series	
Dear DC Super-Villains			2021	Graphic novel	
Dear Justice League			2019	Graphic novel; published under the DC Zoom imprint	
Death of Hawkman		#1–6	Dec 2016 – May 2017	Limited series	
The Death of Superman 30th Anniversary Special		#1	Jan 2023	One-shot	
Death of the New Gods		#1–8	Dec 2007 – Jun 2008	Limited series	
Deathstroke	vol. 1	#48–60	Jun 1995 – Jun 1996	Previously Deathstroke, the Hunted	
Deathstroke	vol. 2	#0–20	Sep 2011 – Jul 2013	Issue #0 was published between #12 and #13	
Deathstroke	vol. 3	#1–20	Dec 2014 – Sep 2016		
Deathstroke	vol. 3	Annual #1–2	2015 – 2016		
Deathstroke	vol. 4	#1–50	Oct 2016 – Feb 2020		
Deathstroke	vol. 4	Annual #1	2018		
Deathstroke	vol. 4	Rebirth #1	Oct 2016		
Deathstroke Inc.		#1–15	Nov 2021 – Jan 2023		
Deathstroke, the Hunted		#0	Oct 1994	Zero Hour tie-in	
Deathstroke, the Hunted		#41–47	Nov 1994	Previously Deathstroke, the Terminator	
Deathstroke, the Terminator	vol. 1	#1–40	Aug 1991 – Jun 1996	Becomes Deathstroke, the Hunted	
Deathstroke, the Terminator	vol. 1	Annual #1–4	1992 – 1995		
Deathstroke, the Terminator	vol. 2	#1–	May 2026 – present		
Deathstroke/Yogi Bear Special		#1	Dec 2018	One-shot	
Debbi's Dates		#1–11	Apr/May 1969 – Dec/Jan 1970/1971		
Demolition Man		#1–4	Nov 1993 – Feb 1994	Limited series; movie adaptation	
The Demon	vol. 1	#1–16	Aug/Sep 1972 – Jan 1974		
The Demon	vol. 2	#1–4	Jan 1987 – Apr 1987	Limited series	
The Demon	vol. 3	#1–58	Jul 1990 – May 1995		
The Demon	vol. 3	#0	Oct 1994	Zero Hour tie-in	
The Demon	vol. 3	Annual #1–2	1992 – 1993		
The Demon	vol. 4	#1–	Dec 2026 – present		
The Demon: Driven Out		#1–6	Nov 2003 – Apr 2004	Limited series	
The Demon: Hell is Earth		#1–6	Jan 2018 – Jun 2018	Limited series	
Demon Knights		#0–23	Sep 2011 – Oct 2013	Issue #0 was published between #12 and #13	
Detective Comics	vol. 1	#1–881	Mar 1937 – Oct 2011		
Detective Comics	vol. 1	#0	Oct 1994	Zero Hour tie-in	
Detective Comics	vol. 1	#1,000,000	Nov 1998	DC One Million tie-in	
Detective Comics	vol. 1	Annual #1–12	1988 – 2011		
Detective Comics	vol. 2	#0–52	Sep 2011 – Jul 2016	Issue #0 was published between #12 and #13	
Detective Comics	vol. 2	#23.1–23.4	Nov 2013	Forever Evil tie-ins	
Detective Comics	vol. 2	Annual #1–3	2012 – 2014		
Detective Comics	vol. 2	Futures End #1	Nov 2014		
Detective Comics	vol. 3	#934–	Aug 2016 – present	Rebirth. Return to original numbering.	
Detective Comics	vol. 3	Annual #1–3	2018 – 2020		
Detective Comics	vol. 3	2021 – 2022 Annual	2021 – 2022		
Detective Comics	vol. 3	2025 Annual #1	2025		
Detective Comics	vol. 3	2026 Annual #1	2026		
Detective Comics	Endgame	#1	May 2015	One-shot	
Detention Comics		#1	Oct 1996	One-shot	
Deus Ex		#1–6	Apr 2011 – Sep 2011	Limited series	
Dexter's Laboratory		#1–29	Sep 1999 – Jan 2002		
Diablo		#1–5	Jan 2012 – Oct 2012	Limited series; published under the DC Entertainment imprint	
Dial H		#0–15	Jul 2012 – Oct 2013	Issue #0 was published between #4 and #5	
Dial H for Hero		#1–12	May 2019 – Apr 2020	Limited series; published under the Wonder Comics pop-up imprint	
Diana and Nubia: Princesses of the Amazons			2022	Graphic novel	
Diana and the Hero's Journey			2023	Graphic novel	
Diana, Princess of the Amazons			2020	Graphic novel	
Doc Savage	vol. 1	#1–4	Nov 1987 – Feb 1988	Limited series; first DC series, previous were published by Street & Smith, Gold Key, Marvel	
Doc Savage	vol. 2	#1–24	Nov 1988 – Oct 1990	Second DC series	
Doc Savage	vol. 2	Annual #1	1989	Second DC series	
Doc Savage	vol. 3	#1–18	Jun 2010 – Aug 2012	Third DC series; Issue #18 released digitally-only	
Doctor Fate	vol. 1	#1–4	Jul 1987 – Oct 1987	Limited series; titled as "Dr. Fate"	
Doctor Fate	vol. 2	#1–41	Winter 1988/1989 – Jun 1992		
Doctor Fate	vol. 2	Annual #1	1989		
Doctor Fate	vol. 3	#1–5	Oct 2003 – Feb 2004	Limited series	
Doctor Fate	vol. 4	#1–18	Aug 2015 – Jan 2017		
Doctor Mid-Nite		#1–3	Feb 1999 – Apr 1999	Limited series	
Doctor Strangefate		#1	Apr 1996	One-shot; published under the Amalgam Comics imprint in association with Marvel	
Dodo and the Frog		#80–92	Oct 1954 – Nov 1957	Formerly Funny Stuff	
Dog Days of Summer		#1	Jul 2019	One-shot	
The Dollhouse Family		#1–6	Jan 2020 – Jul 2020	Limited series; published under the DC Black Label/Hill House Comics imprint	
Doom Force Special		#1	Jul 1992	One-shot	
Doom Patrol	vol. 1	#86–121	Mar 1964 – Sep/Oct 1968	Formerly My Greatest Adventure	
Doom Patrol	vol. 1	#122–124	Feb 1973 – Jul 1973		
Doom Patrol	vol. 2	#1–63	Oct 1987 – Jan 1993	Continued under Vertigo imprint	
Doom Patrol	vol. 2	Annual #1	1988	Continued under Vertigo imprint	
Doom Patrol	vol. 3	#1–22	Dec 2001 – Sep 2003		
Doom Patrol	vol. 4	#1–18	Aug 2004 – Jan 2006		
Doom Patrol	vol. 5	#1–22	Aug 2009 – Apr 2011		
Doom Patrol	vol. 6	#1–12	Nov 2016 – Dec 2018	Published under the Young Animal pop-up imprint	
Doom Patrol	vol. 7	#1–	Nov 2026 – present	Titled The Doom Patrol	
Doom Patrol and Suicide Squad Special		#1	Feb 1988	One-shot	
Doom Patrol/JLA Special		#1	2018	One-shot; published under the Young Animal pop-up imprint	
Doom Patrol: Weight of the Worlds		#1–7	Sep 2019 – Sep 2020	Published under the Young Animal pop-up imprint	
Doomed		#1–6	Aug 2015 – Jan 2016		
Doomsday Annual		#1	1995	One-shot	
Doomsday Clock		#1–12	Jan 2018 – Feb 2020	Limited series	
Doorway to Nightmare		#1–5	Jan/Feb 1978 – Sep/Oct 1978		
Double Action Comics		#2	Jan 1940	One-shot; first issue exists as an ashcan copy	
Dragonlance		#1–34	Dec 1988 – Sep 1991		
The Dragonlance Saga		#4–5	1990 – 1991	Graphic novel adaptations; first three volumes published by TSR	
The Dreaming	vol. 2	#15–20	Jan 2020 – Jun 2020	Published under the DC Black Label imprint; vol. 1 & issues #1–14 published under the Vertigo imprint	
The Dreaming: Waking Hours		#1–12	Oct 2020 – Oct 2021	Limited series; published under the DC Black Label imprint	
Driver: Crossing the Line		#1	Oct 2011	One-shot	
Duo		#1–6	Jul 2022 – Dec 2022	Limited series	
Dynamic Classics		#1	Sep/Oct 1978	Canceled after first issue	

== E ==
Title	Series	Issues	Dates	Notes	Reference
Earth 2		#0–32	May 2012 – Mar 2015	Issue #0 was published between #4 and #5	
Earth 2		#15.1–15.2	Nov 2013	Forever Evil tie-ins	
Earth 2		Annual #1–2	2013 – 2014		
Earth 2		Futures End #1	Nov 2014		
Earth 2: Society		#1–22	Jun 2015 – May 2017		
Earth 2: Society		Annual #1	Oct 2016		
Earth 2: World's End		#1–26	Oct 2014 – Apr 2015	Weekly limited series	
Earth-Prime		#1–6	Jun 2022 – Aug 2022	Limited series	
Eclipso		#1–18	Nov 1992 – Apr 1994		
Eclipso		Annual #1	1993		
Eclipso: The Darkness Within		#1–2	Jul 1992 – Oct 1992	Limited series	
El Diablo	vol. 1	#1–16	Aug 1989 – Jan 1991		
El Diablo	vol. 2	#1–4	Mar 2001 – Jun 2001	See also Vertigo list	
El Diablo	vol. 3	#1–6	Nov 2008 – Apr 2009	Limited series	
Electric Warrior		#1–18	May 1986 – Oct 1987		
Electric Warriors		#1–6	Jan 2019 – Jun 2019	Limited series	
The Elfquest 25th Anniversary Special			Jul 2003	One-shot	
Elfquest: The Discovery		#1–4	Mar 2006 – Sep 2006	Limited series	
Elfquest: The Searcher and the Sword			2004	Graphic novel	
Elongated Man		#1–4	Jan 1992 – Apr 1992	Limited series	
Elseworlds 80-Page Giant		#1	Aug 1999	Elseworlds one-shot	
Elseworld's Finest		#1–2	Oct 1997 – Nov 1997	Elseworlds limited series	
Elseworld's Finest: Supergirl & Batgirl			1998	Elseworlds one-shot	
Elvira's House of Mystery		#1–11	Jan 1986 – Jan 1987		
Elvira's House of Mystery		Special #1	1987		
Emperor Aquaman		#15–	May 2026 – present	Continued from Aquaman vol. 9	
Empire		#0–6	Aug 2003 – Feb 2004	Earlier series (2 issues) published by Gorilla Comics	
End of Nations		#1–4	Jan 2012 – Apr 2012		
Enemy Ace Special		#1	Oct 1990	One-shot	
Enemy Ace: War Idyll			1990	Graphic novel	
Enemy Ace: War in Heaven		#1–2	May 2001 – Jun 2001	Limited series	
Enginehead		#1–6	Jun 2004 – Nov 2004	Limited series	
Eradicator		#1–3	Aug 1996 – Oct 1996	Limited series	
Eternity Girl		#1–6	May 2018 – Oct 2018	Limited series; published under the Young Animal pop-up imprint	
Even More Secret Origins			2003	One-shot	
Event Leviathan		#1–6	Aug 2019 – Jan 2020	Limited series	
Everything Happens to Harvey		#1–7	Sep/Oct 1953 – Sep/Oct 1954		
Exit Stage Left: The Snagglepuss Chronicles		#1–6	Mar 2018 – Aug 2018	Limited series	
Extreme Justice		#0–18	Jan 1995 – Jul 1996		

== F ==
Title	Series	Issues	Dates	Notes	Reference
Fables		#151–162	Jul 2022 – May 2024	Published under the DC Black Label imprint; issues #1–150 published under the Vertigo imprint	
Faces of Evil	Deathstroke	#1	Jan 2009	One-shot	
Faces of Evil	Kobra	#1	Jan 2009	One-shot	
Faces of Evil	Prometheus	#1	Jan 2009	One-shot	
Faces of Evil	Solomon Grundy	#1	Jan 2009	One-shot	
The Fall and Rise of Captain Atom		#1–6	Mar 2017 – Aug 2017	Limited series	
Fallen Angel		#1–20	Sep 2003 – Jul 2005	Creator owned; moved to IDW Publishing	
Falling in Love		#1–143	Nov 1955 – Nov 1973		
The Family Dynamic		#1–3	Oct 2008 – Dec 2008		
Famous 1st Edition		#C-26, C-28, C-30, C-61, F-4–F-8	1974; Oct/Nov 1974 – Aug/Sep 1975; Mar 1979		
Fanboy		#1–6	Mar 1999 – Aug 1999	Limited series	
Fann Club: Batman Squad			2023	Graphic novel	
Far Sector		#1–12	Jan 2020 – Aug 2021	Limited series; published under the Young Animal pop-up imprint	
Fate		#0–22	Oct 1994 – Sep 1996		
Feature Films		#1–4	Mar/Apr 1950 – Sep/Oct 1950		
Female Furies		#1–6	Apr 2019 – Sep 2019	Limited series	
Fifty Who Made DC Great			1985	One-shot	
Fighting American		#1–6	Feb 1994 – Jul 1994	Limited series	
Final Crisis		#1–7	May 2008 – Jan 2009	Limited series	
Final Crisis	Legion of 3 Worlds	#1–5	Aug 2008 – Jul 2009	Limited series	
Final Crisis	Rage of the Red Lanterns	#1	Dec 2008	One-shot	
Final Crisis	Requiem	#1	Sep 2008	One-shot	
Final Crisis	Resist	#1	Dec 2008	One-shot	
Final Crisis	Revelations	#1–5	Aug 2008 – Dec 2008	Limited series	
Final Crisis	Rogues' Revenge	#1–3	Jul 2008 – Dec 2008	Limited series	
Final Crisis	Secret Files	#1	Feb 2009		
Final Crisis	Sketchbook	#1	Jul 2008	One-shot	
Final Crisis	Submit	#1	Dec 2008	One-shot	
Final Crisis	Superman Beyond	#1–2	Aug 2008 – Jan 2009	Limited series	
Final Crisis Aftermath	Dance	#1–6	May 2009 – Oct 2009	Limited series	
Final Crisis Aftermath	Escape	#1–6	May 2009 – Oct 2009	Limited series	
Final Crisis Aftermath	Ink	#1–6	May 2009 – Oct 2009	Limited series	
Final Crisis Aftermath	Run!	#1–6	May 2008 – Oct 2009	Limited series	
The Final Night		#1–4	Nov 1996	Weekly limited series	
Fire & Ice: Welcome to Smallville		#1–6	Nov 2023 – Apr 2024	Limited series	
Fire & Ice: When Hell Freezes Over		#1–6	Jun 2025 – Nov 2025	Limited series	
Firebrand		#1–9	Feb 1996 – Oct 1996		
Firestorm	vol. 1	#1–5	Mar 1978 – Oct/Nov 1978		
Firestorm	vol. 2	#93–100	Jan 1990 – Aug 1990	Formerly Firestorm the Nuclear Man	
Firestorm	vol. 2	Annual #5	1987	Formerly Fury of Firestorm Annual	
Firestorm	vol. 3	#1–22	Jul 2004 – Apr 2006	Becomes Firestorm the Nuclear Man vol. 2	
Firestorm the Nuclear Man	vol. 1	#65–92	Nov 1987 – Dec 1989	Formerly Fury of Firestorm; becomes Firestorm vol. 2	
Firestorm the Nuclear Man	vol. 2	#23–35	May 2006 – Jun 2007	Formerly Firestorm vol. 3	
First Wave		#1–6	May 2010 – Mar 2011	Limited series	
First Wave		Special #1	Jun 2011		
The Flash	vol. 1	#105–350	Feb/Mar 1959 – Oct 1985	Continues numbering from Flash Comics	
The Flash	vol. 1	Annual #1	1963		
The Flash	vol. 2	#1–230, 231–247	Jun 1987 – Mar 2006; Oct 2007 – Dec 2008	Issues #1–139 were titled simply Flash in the indicia	
The Flash	vol. 2	#0	Oct 1994	Zero Hour tie-in	
The Flash	vol. 2	#1,000,000	Nov 1998	DC One Million tie-in	
The Flash	vol. 2	80-Page Giant #1–2	1998 – 1999		
The Flash	vol. 2	Annual #1–13	1987 – 2000		
The Flash	vol. 2	Plus #1	1997		
The Flash	vol. 2	Secret Files #1–3	1997; 1999; 2001		
The Flash	vol. 2	Special #1	1990	50th anniversary	
The Flash	vol. 3	#1–12	Jun 2010 – Jul 2011		
The Flash	vol. 3	Secret Files and Origins 2010	Apr 2010		
The Flash	vol. 4	#0–52	Nov 2011 – Jul 2016	Issue #0 was published between #12 and #13	
The Flash	vol. 4	#23.1–23.3	Nov 2013	Forever Evil tie-ins	
The Flash	vol. 4	Annual #1–4	2012 – 2015		
The Flash	vol. 4	Futures End #1	Nov 2014		
The Flash	vol. 5	#1–88, 750–800	Aug 2016 – Aug 2023	Took the combined numbering of previous volumes after issue #88	
The Flash	vol. 5	Annual #1–3	2018 – 2020		
The Flash	vol. 5	2021 – 2022 Annual	2021 – 2022		
The Flash	vol. 5	One-Minute War Special #1	Mar 2023		
The Flash	vol. 5	Rebirth #1	Aug 2016		
The Flash	vol. 6	#1–	Nov 2023 – present		
The Flash	vol. 6	2024 Annual	2024		
The Flash	vol. 6	Bad Moon Rising Special #1	Sep 2025		
Flash and Green Lantern: The Brave and the Bold		#1–6	Oct 1999 – Mar 2000	Limited series	
Flash Comics		#1–104	Jan 1940 – Feb 1949	Numbering continues as The Flash	
Flash Facts			2021	Graphic novel	
Flash Forward		#1–6	Nov 2019 – Apr 2020	Limited series	
Flash Gordon		#1–9	Jun 1988 – Holiday 1988/1989	Limited series	
Flash/Green Lantern: Faster Friends			1997	Limited series; part two of two; continued from Green Lantern/Flash: Faster Friends	
The Flash: Iron Heights			Aug 2001	One-shot	
The Flash: One-Minute War - Start the Clock		#1	May 2023	One-shot	
The Flash: Our Worlds at War		#1	Oct 2001	One-shot	
The Flash: Rebirth		#1–6	Jun 2009 – Apr 2010	Limited series	
The Flash: Season Zero		#1–12	Dec 2014 – Nov 2015	Based on the 2014 TV Series	
Flash/Speed Buggy Special		#1	Jul 2018	One-shot	
The Flash: The Fastest Man Alive	vol. 1	#1–13	Aug 2006 – Aug 2007	Issues #14–16 solicited, but replaced with All-Flash #1 and The Flash vol. 2 #231 and on	
The Flash: The Fastest Man Alive	vol. 2	#1–3	Nov 2022 – Jan 2023	Limited series; movie tie-in	
The Flash: Time Flies			Jul 2002	One-shot	
The Flash TV Special		#1	Jan 1991	One-shot; based on the 1990 TV Series	
Flashpoint (1999)		#1–3	Dec 1999 – Feb 2000	Elseworlds limited series	
Flashpoint (2011)		#1–5	Jul 2011 – Oct 2011	Limited series	
Flashpoint (2011)	Abin Sur - The Green Lantern	#1–3	Aug 2011 – Oct 2011	Limited series	
Flashpoint (2011)	Batman - Knight of Vengeance	#1–3	Aug 2011 – Oct 2011	Limited series	
Flashpoint (2011)	Citizen Cold	#1–3	Aug 2011 – Oct 2011	Limited series	
Flashpoint (2011)	Deadman and the Flying Graysons	#1–3	Aug 2011 – Oct 2011	Limited series	
Flashpoint (2011)	Deathstroke & the Curse of the Ravager	#1–3	Aug 2011 – Oct 2011	Limited series	
Flashpoint (2011)	Emperor Aquaman	#1–3	Aug 2011 – Oct 2011	Limited series	
Flashpoint (2011)	Frankenstein & the Creatures of the Unknown	#1–3	Aug 2011 – Oct 2011	Limited series	
Flashpoint (2011)	Green Arrow Industries	#1	Aug 2011	One-shot	
Flashpoint (2011)	Grodd of War	#1	Aug 2011	One-shot	
Flashpoint (2011)	Hal Jordan	#1–3	Aug 2011 – Oct 2011	Limited series	
Flashpoint (2011)	Kid Flash Lost	#1–3	Aug 2011 – Oct 2011	Limited series	
Flashpoint (2011)	Lois Lane and the Resistance	#1–3	Aug 2011 – Oct 2011	Limited series	
Flashpoint (2011)	Project Superman	#1–3	Aug 2011 – Oct 2011	Limited series	
Flashpoint (2011)	Reverse-Flash	#1	Aug 2011	One-shot	
Flashpoint (2011)	Secret Seven	#1–3	Aug 2011 – Oct 2011	Limited series	
Flashpoint (2011)	The Canterbury Cricket	#1	Aug 2011	One-shot	
Flashpoint (2011)	The Legion of Doom	#1–3	Aug 2011 – Oct 2011	Limited series	
Flashpoint (2011)	The Outsider	#1–3	Aug 2011 – Oct 2011	Limited series	
Flashpoint (2011)	The World of Flashpoint	#1–3	Aug 2011 – Oct 2011	Limited series	
Flashpoint (2011)	Wonder Woman and the Furies	#1–3	Aug 2011 – Oct 2011	Limited series	
Flashpoint Beyond		#0–6	Jun 2022 – Dec 2022	Limited series	
The Flintstones		#1–12	Sep 2016 – Aug 2017		
The Flintstones and the Jetsons		#1–21	Aug 1997 – May 1999		
Flippity and Flop		#1–46, 47	Dec/Jan 1951/1952 – Oct 1959; Sep/Nov 1960		
Forbidden Tales of Dark Mansion		#5–15	May/Jun 1972 – Feb/Mar 1974	Formerly Dark Mansion of Forbidden Love	
Forever Evil		#1–7	Nov 2013 – Jul 2014	Limited series	
Forever Evil	A.R.G.U.S.	#1–6	Dec 2013 – May 2014	Limited series	
Forever Evil	Arkham War	#1–6	Dec 2013 – May 2014	Limited series	
Forever Evil	Rogues Rebellion	#1–6	Dec 2013 – May 2014	Limited series	
Forever Evil Aftermath: Batman vs. Bane		#1	Jun 2014	One-shot	
Forever Maelstrom		#1–6	Jan 2003 – Jun 2003	Limited series	
Forever People	vol. 1	#1–11	Feb/Mar 1971 – Oct/Nov 1972	Jack Kirby's Fourth World	
Forever People	vol. 2	#1–6	Feb 1988 – Jul 1988	Limited series	
Forgotten Realms		#1–25	1990 – 1991		
Forgotten Realms		Annual #1	1990		
Formerly Known as the Justice League		#1–6	Sep 2003 – Feb 2004		
Four-Star Battle Tales		#1–5	Feb/Mar 1973 – Nov/Dec 1973		
Four-Star Spectacular		#1–6	Mar/Apr 1976 – Jan/Feb 1977		
The Fourth World Gallery			Sep 1996	One-shot	
The Fox and the Crow		#1–108	Dec/Jan 1951/1952 – Feb/Mar 1968	Becomes Stanley and His Monster	
Frankenstein, Agent of S.H.A.D.E.		#0–16	Nov 2011 – Mar 2013	Issue #0 was published between #12 and #13	
Freedom Fighters	vol. 1	#1–15	Mar/Apr 1976 – Jul/Aug 1978		
Freedom Fighters	vol. 2	#1–9	Nov 2010 – Jul 2011	Limited series	
Freedom Fighters	vol. 3	#1–12	Feb 2019 – Mar 2020	Limited series	
From Beyond the Unknown		#1–25	Oct/Nov 1969 – Nov/Dec 1973		
From the DC Vault: Death in the Family: Robin Lives!		#1–4	Sep 2024 – Dec 2024	Limited series	
Frontier Fighters		#1–8	Sep/Oct 1955 – Nov/Dec 1956		
Funny Folks		#1–26	Apr/May 1946 – Jun/Jul 1950	Becomes Hollywood Funny Folks	
Funny Stuff		#1–79	Summer 1944 – Jul/Aug 1954	Becomes The Dodo and the Frog	
Funny Stuff Stocking Stuffer		#1	Mar 1985	One-shot	
The Fury of Firestorm	vol. 1	#1–64	Jun 1982 – Oct 1987	Becomes Firestorm the Nuclear Man	
The Fury of Firestorm	vol. 1	Annual #1–4	1983 – 1986		
The Fury of Firestorm	vol. 2	#1–	Jun 2026 – present	Limited series	
The Fury of Firestorm: The Nuclear Man		#13–20	Dec 2012 – Jul 2013	Formerly The Fury of Firestorm: The Nuclear Men	
The Fury of Firestorm: The Nuclear Men		#0–12	Nov 2011 – Nov 2012	Becomes The Fury of Firestorm: The Nuclear Man; issue #0 was published after #12	
Future Quest		#1–12	Jul 2016 – Jul 2017		
Future Quest Presents		#1–12	Oct 2017 – Sep 2018		
Future State	Aquaman	#1–2	Mar 2021 – Apr 2021	Limited series	
Future State	Batman/Superman	#1–2	Mar 2021 – Apr 2021	Limited series	
Future State	Catwoman	#1–2	Mar 2021 – Apr 2021	Limited series	
Future State	Dark Detective	#1–4	Mar 2021 – Apr 2021	Limited series	
Future State	Gotham	#1–18	Jul 2021 – Dec 2022		
Future State	Green Lantern	#1–2	Mar 2021 – Apr 2021	Limited series	
Future State	Harley Quinn	#1–2	Mar 2021 – Apr 2021	Limited series	
Future State	Immortal Wonder Woman	#1–2	Mar 2021 – Apr 2021	Limited series	
Future State	Justice League	#1–2	Mar 2021 – Apr 2021	Limited series	
Future State	Kara Zor-El, Superwoman	#1–2	Mar 2021 – Apr 2021	Limited series	
Future State	Legion of Super-Heroes	#1–2	Mar 2021 – Apr 2021	Limited series	
Future State	Nightwing	#1–2	Mar 2021 – Apr 2021	Limited series	
Future State	Robin Eternal	#1–2	Mar 2021 – Apr 2021	Limited series	
Future State	Shazam!	#1–2	Mar 2021 – Apr 2021	Limited series	
Future State	Suicide Squad	#1–2	Mar 2021 – Apr 2021	Limited series	
Future State	Superman: House of El	#1	Apr 2021	One-shot	
Future State	Superman of Metropolis	#1–2	Mar 2021 – Apr 2021	Limited series	
Future State	Superman vs. Imperious Lex	#1–3	Mar 2021 – May 2021	Limited series	
Future State	Superman/Wonder Woman	#1–2	Mar 2021 – Apr 2021	Limited series	
Future State	Superman: Worlds of War	#1–2	Mar 2021 – Apr 2021	Limited series	
Future State	Swamp Thing	#1–2	Mar 2021 – Apr 2021	Limited series	
Future State	Teen Titans	#1–2	Mar 2021 – Apr 2021	Limited series	
Future State	Teen Titans – Ruins	#1	May 2021	One-shot	
Future State	The Flash	#1–2	Mar 2021 – Apr 2021	Limited series	
Future State	The Next Batman	#1–4	Mar 2021 – Apr 2021	Limited series	
Future State	Wonder Woman	#1–2	Mar 2021 – Apr 2021	Limited series	

== See also ==
- List of current DC Comics publications
- List of DC Comics reprint collections
- List of DC Archive Editions
- List of DC Comics imprint publications
- List of Elseworlds publications
- List of DC Comics characters

DC Comics has also published titles under other imprints (chiefly Vertigo, Milestone, WildStorm, ABC, Paradox Press, Amalgam, DC Focus, Johnny DC, Tangent, CMX, Impact, Helix, Minx, and Homage) along with a number of reprints.
