= Chloe Lattanzi =

American singer and actress (born 1986)

- Born: Chloe Rose Lattanzi; January 17, 1986 (age 40); Los Angeles, California, U.S.
- Genres: Pop; dance
- Occupations: Singer; actress
- Instrument: Vocals
- Years active: 1993–present

Chloe Rose Lattanzi (born January 17, 1986) is an American singer and actress.

== Biography ==
=== Personal life ===
Lattanzi was born on January 17, 1986, at Cedars-Sinai Medical Center in Los Angeles, California. She is the daughter of singer and actress Olivia Newton-John and actor Matt Lattanzi. Her parents divorced amicably in 1995. One of her maternal great-grandfathers was Nobel Prize–winning physicist Max Born.

Since turning 18, Lattanzi has undergone numerous plastic surgery procedures, reportedly to a value in excess of $500,000. In 2013, she was treated for cocaine addiction. In 2017, she moved with her fiancé, martial arts trainer James Driskill to Portland, Oregon, where they bought a farm and started a marijuana business.

=== Musical career ===
In 2002, Lattanzi portrayed Chrissy in a Melbourne stage production of the 1960s musical Hair.

Lattanzi is the writer of "Can I Trust Your Arms", which appeared on her mother's 2005 album Stronger Than Before.

In 2008, Lattanzi appeared on the reality show Rock the Cradle, finishing in third place, following Jesse Blaze Snider and Crosby Loggins.

In October 2010, Lattanzi's debut single "Wings and a Gun" was released digitally in Japan.

== Discography ==
=== Albums ===
List of albums, with selected details
| Title | Details |
|---|---|
| No Pain | Released: October 2016; Format: Digital; Label: Chloe Lattanzi |

=== Singles ===
List of singles, with selected chart positions
| Title | Year | Peak chart positions | |
| Title | Year | AUS Indie | US Dance |
|---|---|---|---|
| "Wings and a Gun" | 2010 | — | — |
| "Play with Me" | 2011 | — | — |
| "You Have to Believe" (Dave Audé featuring Olivia Newton-John and Chloe Lattanzi) | 2015 | — | 1 |
| "Window in the Wall" (with Olivia Newton-John) | 2021 | 2 | — |

== Filmography ==
- Paradise Beach (1993) (cameo in last episode of Australian television soap)
- A Christmas Romance (1994) (TV movie)
- Mannheim Steamroller's Christmas Angel (1998) (TV show)
- The Enchanted Billabong (1999) (voice in Australian animated feature)
- Bette (2001) (episode: "The Invisible Mom")
- The Wilde Girls (2001) (TV movie)
- Dead 7 (2016)
- Sharknado 5: Global Swarming (2017) (TV movie)
- Dancing with the Stars Australia (2020) (contestant)
- ’’Deltopia’’ (2023)

== See also ==
- List of artists who reached number one on the U.S. Dance Club Songs chart
