= Rock the Cradle =

- Genre: Interactive reality game show
- Created by: Christine Scowley; Tara-Anne Johnson
- Developed by: FremantleMedia North America
- Directed by: Jonathan Bullen
- Presented by: Ryan Devlin
- Judges: Belinda Carlisle; Jamie King; Brian Friedman (guest judge, week 4); June Ambrose; Larry Rudolph
- Country of origin: United States
- Original language: English
- No. of seasons: 1
- No. of episodes: 6

Production
- Executive producers: David Goffin; George Moll; Larry Rudolph; Cecile Frot-Coutaz
- Production locations: Los Angeles, California

Original release
- Network: MTV
- Release: April 3 – May 8, 2008

Rock the Cradle is an MTV reality show in which the offspring of R&B, pop, and rock stars from the 1980s and 1990s vie in a six-week singing competition. The show debuted on April 3, 2008, and ended on May 8 of the same year.

== Personnel ==
The show was hosted by Ryan Devlin, and there was a panel of four judges composed of The Go-Go's lead vocalist Belinda Carlisle, choreographer Jamie King, celebrity fashion stylist June Ambrose, and entertainment attorney/personal manager Larry Rudolph, who was also one of the executive producers. Brian Friedman substituted for an absent King in the fourth week.

== Scoring and elimination ==
Judges rated performances each week, and the highest-scoring contestant earned immunity from elimination for the following week. Elimination was determined by popular vote via toll-free telephone calls and text messaging. No immunity was granted for week five's performances, so all three finalists were subject to the popular vote and elimination to determine the winner.

== Contestants ==
The following contestants were featured:

Contestant	Age	Relation	Rank
Landon Brown	21	Son of Bobby Brown	6th Place
A'Keiba Burrell-Hammer	20	Daughter of MC Hammer	8th Place
Lara Johnston	17	Daughter of The Doobie Brothers lead singer Tom Johnston	5th Place
Chloe Lattanzi	22	Daughter of Olivia Newton-John	3rd Place
Crosby Loggins	27	Son of singer Kenny Loggins	1st Place
Jesse Money	19	Daughter of Eddie Money	9th Place
Jesse Blaze Snider	25	Son of Twisted Sister lead singer Dee Snider	2nd Place
Lil B. Sure!	21	Son of Al B. Sure!	7th Place
Lucy Walsh	24	Daughter of Joe Walsh	4th Place

== Results ==
The following list is presented in the order in which the contestants performed.

Weekly Results by Call-out
Episode 1	Episode 2	Episode 3	Episode 4	Episode 5	Episode 6
Landon; 26.5	Lucy; 31.0	**Jesse S.** **37.5**	Jesse S. 31.0	Crosby; 38.0	Crosby
A'Keiba; 34.5	**Jesse S.** **35.5**	Crosby; 34.0	Lara; 26.0	Chloe; 32.0	Jesse S.
Lara; 28.5	Lara; 31.5	Chloe; 36.0	Lucy; 37.5	**Jesse S.** **39.0**	Chloe
Chloe; 25.5	A'Keiba; 30.5	Lara; 30.5	Chloe; 21.0	Lucy	
Crosby; 33.5	Crosby; 32.5	Lil B. 21.5	**Crosby**; **38.5**	Lara	
Jesse S. 32.5	Landon. 33.5	Landon; 14.0	Landon		
Jesse M. 30.5	Lil B. 25.0	Lucy; 28.5	Lil B		
Lil B. 31.0	Chloe; 27.0	A'keiba			
**Lucy**; **36.5**	Jesse M.				

The contestant earned immunity for next week's elimination.
The contestant was eliminated.
The contestant won the competition.
Bold: The contestant had the highest score for that week.
Italics: The contestant had the lowest score for that week.

== Items ==
- Chloe Rose Lattanzi was the only contestant whose familial connection was her mother rather than her father.
- Episode 2 introduced a fifth score screen representing the singer's total score, which was not present in Episode 1.
- The show was conceived as an eight-week contest, but due to lower-than-expected ratings, an announcement in Episode 3 declared that subsequent episodes would have double eliminations, reducing the total number of broadcast shows to six. The Finale was moved from Las Vegas, Nevada to Los Angeles.
- After winning the immunity spot for Episode 2, Jesse Blaze Snider attempted to reject his second immunity on Episode 3. Producers forced him to accept the untouchable chair, ejecting Crosby Loggins for his earlier performance.
- A'Keiba Burrell-Hammer's parent is a rapper rather than a singer.
