= Crosby Loggins =

American musician (born 1980)

- Born: December 15, 1980 (age 45); Los Angeles, California
- Origin: Santa Barbara, California
- Genre: Pop rock
- Occupations: Singer; songwriter
- Years active: 2007—present

Crosby Sullivan Loggins (born December 15, 1980) is an American singer and songwriter. He is the oldest son of Grammy winning artist Kenny Loggins and his first wife, Eva Ein. In 2008, he was the winner of MTV's Rock the Cradle.

== Early life ==
Loggins grew up in Santa Barbara, California. He was constantly surrounded by his father's celebrity friends such as Jackson Browne, Graham Nash, Michael McDonald and Glen Phillips of Toad the Wet Sprocket. On Rock the Cradle, Kenny admitted that he had been touring during a significant amount of Loggins' childhood. Loggins was enthralled with the famous people he came to meet, but he stated that "Dad was just dad." He learned how to play the keyboard when he was seven and the guitar at age thirteen. From a young age, Loggins wanted to pursue music, because of his own love for it, rather than wanting to follow in his father's footsteps. He played in sporadic high school bands, but admitted that he was not yet ready for stardom. Loggins lived in Hawaii for some time after he was seen as just his father's son. He was still very interested in music, and after working in construction for a few years, Loggins decided to study at a conservatory.

== Crosby Loggins and the Light ==
Loggins got together with some of his friends in California to form a band called Crosby Loggins and the Leadbirds, but this was difficult for some to pronounce. Crosby Loggins and the Namedroppers was their next name, after which they settled for a new name, Crosby Loggins and the Light. Their debut album, We All Go Home, was released on September 25, 2007. They have played over 100 shows in both the United States and Europe. Crosby co-wrote 10 of the 12 songs on the album, and was the sole writer of the song, "We All Go Home".

=== Band members ===
Name	Instrument(s)
Crosby Loggins	Lead Vocals, Guitars
Paul Cartwright	Vocals, Mandolin, Violin
Dennis Hamm	Keyboards
Jarred Pope	Drums and Percussion
Forrestt Williams	Bass
Jesse Siebenberg	Vocals, Guitar, Lap Steel, Production

== Rock The Cradle ==
Crosby was offered to appear on the MTV reality show Rock the Cradle in the beginning of 2008, which tried to determine which musically successful parents had the most talented children. Crosby rejected MTV's offer three times before agreeing to take part in the show. He was said to be "apprehensive" about it.

=== Performance overview ===
Week	Theme	Song
1	Song That Describes Your Relationship With Your Parent	"(What's So Funny 'Bout) Peace, Love, and Understanding" - Nick Lowe
2	Parent's Choice	"I Don't Wanna Be" - Gavin DeGraw
3	New Spin On Parent's Song	"I'm Alright" - Kenny Loggins
4	Contestant's Choice	"Long Road to Ruin" - Foo Fighters
5	Judges' Choice	"Beverly Hills" - Weezer & "Over My Head (Cable Car)" - The Fray
6	Finale	"Steady, As She Goes" - The Raconteurs, "I'm Alright" - Kenny Loggins (with Kenny Loggins) & "Believe" - The Bravery

=== Week 1 ===
Crosby chose to sing "What's So Funny About Peace, Love, and Understanding?" by Nick Lowe because he and his father both like "uplifting material". He received a score of 33.5 out of 40 points. (individually 8.5, 7.5, 9, and 8.5) He did not receive a place in the untouchable chair and was up for elimination.

=== Week 2 ===
Crosby was announced as safe. Kenny chose "I Don't Wanna Be" by Gavin Degraw for Crosby to sing. Crosby was nervous that since this song was not his usual genre, the "audience would pick up on that", despite his father's utmost confidence in him. He received a score of 32.5 out of possible 40 points. (individually receiving a 6.5, 8, 9 and 9) He received a high 9 from judge June Ambrose for being consistent and a low 6.5 from judge Belinda Carlisle because she viewed his performance as disappointing and boring. He, once again, did not receive a place in the untouchable chair and was up for elimination.

=== Week 3 ===
Crosby was announced as safe. He chose to do a cover of his father's song "I'm All Right" He received a score of 34 out of 40 points. (individually 7.5, 7.5, 10, 9) He received a perfect 10 from judge June Ambrose for his sex appeal and a low score of 7.5 from judge Belinda Carlisle because she claimed he was awkward and called his performance "frat-rock" He, once again, did not receive a place in the untouchable chair and was up for elimination.

=== Week 4 ===
Crosby was announced as safe. He broke out the electric guitar and drove the crowd crazy with his rendition of "Long Road To Ruin" by the Foo Fighters. He received a score of 38.5 out of 40, getting the highest score of the season thus far, and the overall season's second highest. (individually 10, 9.5, 10, and 9) He got a perfect 10 from judge Belinda Carlisle because she felt his passion she knew he had and the lowest score of 9 from judge Larry Rudolph for lack of being able to reach out to the audience. After a near perfect score, Crosby was given a seat in the untouchable chair and will automatically be performing Week 5, which is also the last night to vote and the three remaining contestants will be in the finale. Crosby will automatically be in the finale.

=== Week 5 ===
Since Crosby was in the untouchable chair, he was automatically safe. Host Ryan Devlin announced that the first song would not be judged. Crosby sang "Beverly Hills" by Weezer and got good reviews from the judges. Crosby's second song was "Over My Head" by The Fray in which he played the piano for the first time this season. He broke out of his crowd comfort zone by dancing in the audience. He received a very high score of 38 out of 40 points. He lost his ranking of highest scorer of the season to Jesse Blaze Snider, who received an almost perfect 39. Because the next episode is the finale, the points do not matter. Crosby will be joined by Chloe Lattanzi, daughter of Olivia Newton-John, and Jesse Blaze Snider, son of Dee Snider.

=== Finale ===
On the finale, Crosby redid "I'm Alright" with his father, Kenny Loggins, with him, and sang The Bravery's "Believe". Chloe Lattanzi was eliminated and the final two were Jesse Blaze Snider and Crosby. The host, Ryan Devlin, announced that Crosby was the winner of Rock the Cradle. Crosby fell to his knees and covered his face. His father stood up and said they were very proud. Crosby thanked his fans, the band, his girlfriend, and his family. He picked up an acoustic guitar and played the opening song off his album, called "Good Enough". The show closed with confetti falling from the ceiling and Crosby receiving congrats from former contestants and friends.
