= Tom Peyer =

American comic creator

- Born: February 23, 1954 (age 72) Syracuse, New York, U.S.
- Areas: Writer, editor

Tom Peyer (born February 23, 1954) is an American comic book creator and editor. He is known for his 1999 revisioning of Golden Age super-hero Hourman, as well as his work on the Legion of Super-Heroes in the 1990s. An editor at DC Comics/Vertigo from 1987 to 1993, he served as assistant editor on Neil Gaiman's Sandman. Peyer has also worked for Marvel Comics, Wildstorm, and Bongo Comics. With John Layman, he wrote the 2007–2009 Tek Jansen comic book, based on the Stephen Colbert character.

== Biography ==
Peyer started drawing political cartoons and illustrations for various student underground newspapers in his hometown of Syracuse, New York, while in high school. His professional career began as a newspaper cartoonist for The Syracuse New Times, an alternative weekly newspaper in Syracuse, New York. In this role, he came to the attention of Roger Stern, a Syracuse resident.

Peyer was an editor at DC Comics/Vertigo during the same time as Mark Waid, and the two have been frequent collaborators. Another long-time collaborator is writer Hart Seely, with whom Peyer created a collection of found poetry based on the calls of baseball icon Phil Rizzuto.

== Selected bibliography ==
=== As writer ===
==== DC Comics ====
Titles published by DC Comics and its various imprints include:

- Action Comics, #723, 757
- Adventure Comics, 80-Page Giant (1998)
- Adventures of Superman Annual #8 (1996), #536, 570
- "All-Star Comics 80-Page Giant" (1999)
- Atom Special (1993) #1 and 2
- The Authority (1999)#23–26 ("Transfer of Power")
- Batman: Gotham Knights (2000) #15 ("Far from the Tree")
- Batman: Legends of the Dark Knight #169–171 ("Irresistible", Parts One, Two, and Three)
- Big Book of... #6 ("Big Book of Little Criminals") and 7 ("Big Book of Hoaxes")
- Cruel and Unusual (with co-author Jamie Delano, pencils by John McCrea and inks by Andrew Chiu, Vertigo, 4-issue mini-series, 1999)
- DC 2000 (2000), #1 and 2
- Doctor Fate (1988), #35 and 36
- Elseworlds 80 Page Giant (1999), #1
- Flash & Green Lantern: The Brave and the Bold (1999), #1–6
- The Flash 80-Page Giant (1998), #2
- The Flash Secret Files (1997), #2
- The Flash (1987) Annual 8, #238–243
- Golden Age Secret Files (2001), #1
- Hourman #1–25
- Impulse (1995), Annual 02, #19 and 28
- JLA 80-Page Giant (1998), #1 and 2
- JLA in Crisis Secret Files and Origins (1998), #1
- JLA Secret Files and Origins (1997), 33
- JLA: Tomorrow Woman (1998), #1
- Justice Leagues Part I: Twilight's Last Gleaming
- Justice Leagues Part VI: Dawn's Early Light
- The Justice Society Returns
- L.E.G.I.O.N. (1989), Annual 05, #61–70
- Legends of the DC Universe 80-Page Giant (1998), #2
- Legends of the Legion (1998), #1–4
- Legion of Super-Heroes (1989), Annual 06 and 07, #67–108, 110–121, #1000000
- Legion of Super-Heroes: The Beginning of Tomorrow (1999)
- Legion: Secret Files (1998), #1 and 2
- Legionnaires (1993), #19–34, 40, 44, 47, 54, 75, 1000000
- The Making of Hourman (1998), #1
- New Gods (vol. 4) #1–5 (with co-author Rachel Pollack, and pencils by Luke Ross, DC Comics, 1995–1996)
- Power of the Atom (1988), #14–18
- R.E.B.E.L.S. '94 (1994), #0–2
- R.E.B.E.L.S. '95 (1995), #3–14
- R.E.B.E.L.S. '96 (1996), #15–17
- Secret Origins 80-Page Giant (1998), #1
- Secret Origins of Super Villains (1999), #1
- Showcase '96 (1996), #11 and 12
- Silver Age: Doom Patrol (2000), #1
- Superboy (1990), #13, 14
- Supergirl (1996), Annual 02
- Superman (1987), #31, 114
- Superman & Batman Magazine (1993), #3
- Superman Plus (1997), #1
- Superman: The Man of Steel (1991), #92
- Team Titans (1992), #11 and 12
- The Titans (1999), #42–50
- V2K: Totems (with Richard Case, Duncan Fegredo and Dean Ormston, Vertigo, 2000)
- WildStorm Winter Special (2005)

==== Marvel Comics ====
Titles published by Marvel include:

- Amazing Spider-Man Digital (2009) #13–15
- Amazing Spider-Man Family (2008), #8
- The Amazing Spider-Man #623, 624, 628

Spider-Man: The Gauntlet, vol. 03

- Doom 2099 (1993), #41
- House of M (2005)
- House of M: Spider-Man, Fantastic Four & X-Men (2009)
- Magnetic Men Featuring Magneto (1997), #1
- Marvel Apes (2008), #1 and 2
- Marvel Apes: Amazing Spider-Monkey Special (2009), #1
- Marvel Apes: Grunt Line Special (2009), #1
- Marvel Apes: Speedball Special (2009), #1
- Marvel Apes: The Evolution Starts Here (2009)
- Marvel Team-Up (1997), #1–6, 8–11
- Marvel Valentine Special (1997), #1
- The Pulse: House of M Special (2005), #1
- The Punisher (2001), #9–12
- Quicksilver (1997), #1–6
- Return to the Amalgam Age of Comics (1997)

Volume 2 – "The Marvel Comics Collection"

- Spider-Man Team-Up (1995), #1
- Spider-Man: House of M (2005), #1–5
- Web of Spider-Man (2009), #2
- Wha...Huh? (2005), #1
- X-Nation 2099 (1996), #1–3

==== Bongo Comics ====
Titles published by Bongo include:

- Bongo Comics Free-For-All (2006)
- Bongo Comics Presents Simpsons Super Spectacular (2006), #4
- Simpsons Comics (1993), #125
- Simpsons Comics Presents Bart Simpson (2000), #21–23, 25, 26, 28–30, 34, 42
- Simpsons Comics Presents Bart Simpson vol. 06, "Big Beastly Book of Bart Simpson"

==== Other publishers ====
Titles published by various American publishers include:

- Cthulhu Tales (2008), #1
- Dragonfly & Dragonflyman (2019), #1–5
- Go Boy 7: Human Action Machine (2003), #1–4
- Magnus Robot Fighter (1997), #1–18
- Noble Causes: Extended Family (2003), #2
- Rocket Comics: Ignite (2003), #1
- Smash Comics (1999), #1
- Solar, Man of the Atom: Hell on Earth (1998), #2
- Stephen Colbert's Tek Jansen (2007), #1–5
- The Wrong Earth (2018), #1–6
- ZERO (1974), #2
- Zombie Tales: The Series (2008), #9

==== Books ====
- Rizzuto, Phil (2008). Tom Peyer; Hart Seely (eds.). O Holy Cow!: The Selected Verse of Phil Rizzuto. Harper Paperbacks. ISBN 978-0-06-156713-1.
- Peyer, Tom (1988). Ronald Reagan's Contradictionary of the American Language. Quinlan Press. ISBN 978-1-55770-056-8.
- Peyer, Tom (1982). Sideshow: Cartoons from the Syracuse New Times. Times-Advocate of New York, Inc. ASIN B00073EYZ2 (UK).

=== As editor ===
- Animal Man (1988), Annual 1, #35–63.
- Black Orchid (1988), Annual 1, #1–4
- Constantine: The Hellblazer Collection (2005)
- Doom Force Special (1992), #1 ("Judgment Day")
- Doom Patrol (1987), Annual 02, #44–71
- Hellblazer (1988), #29–41
- Kid Eternity (1993), #1–8
- The Sandman (1989), #16–25
- Shade, the Changing Man (1990), #1–12
- Swamp Thing, #96–100
- Vertigo Jam (1993), #1
- Vertigo Visions: The Geek, #1
- Vertigo Visions: Phantom Stranger, #1
- War of the Gods (1991), #2–4
- Who's Who in the DC Universe, #9, 10, 15
- Wonder Woman (1987), #43–62
