= Michael Jaffe =

American TV and film producer (born 1945)

- Born: Michael Muir Jaffe; January 9, 1945 (age 81); New York City, New York, U.S.
- Occupations: Television producer, writer
- Television: A Nero Wolfe Mystery; The Rosa Parks Story

Michael Muir Jaffe (born January 9, 1945) is an American TV and film producer. He started out in the business with his father, producer and former AFTRA lawyer Henry Jaffe (1907–1992). His mother was actress Jean Muir. He has more than 120 producing credits but ventured into writing and directing only for the A&E television series A Nero Wolfe Mystery (2001–02), which he called "the love of my life".

He is a founding partner of Jaffe/Braunstein Films in 1993 with Howard Braunstein, which became Jaffe/Braunstein Entertainment in 2007, when ITV, via Granada America, bought a controlling share of 51% in the company.

In 2011, Jaffe and Braunstein part ways, with the latter being moved to TNT. Prior to that, he ran Spectacor Films, a film division of Spectacor, of which was a founding member of distribution company ACI (Allied Communications Inc.) before being sold to Pearson Television in 1995. He also operated the company Michael Jaffe Films.

Jaffe holds a BA from Yankton College and an MA in Theater from Cornell University.

== Filmography ==
=== Producer ===
Michael Jaffe is credited as executive producer unless noted.

Year	Title	Notes
1973	Alexander (TV)	
1974	Emergency +4 (TV series)	12 episodes
1977	The Death of Richie (TV)	producer
1977	Emily, Emily (TV)	producer
1977	Romance (TV series)	producer, episode "Emily"
1978	Battered (TV)	producer
1978	A Woman Called Moses (TV)	producer
1979	When She Was Bad… (TV)	producer
1979	Aunt Mary (TV)	producer
1980	Escape (TV)	producer
1981	Incident at Crestridge (TV)	
1982	A New Day in Eden (TV series)	
1982	I Was a Mail Order Bride (TV)	producer
1984	The Seduction of Gina (TV)	
1985	Better Off Dead	producer
1985	Bad Medicine	
1986	One Crazy Summer	producer
1986	Crime Story (TV series)	producer
1987	Disorderlies	producer
1988	18 Again!	
1988	The Great Escape II: The Untold Story (TV)	
1989	The Hijacking of the Achille Lauro (TV)	
1990	On Thin Ice: The Tai Babilonia Story (TV)	
1991	Wedlock	
1991	In the Nick of Time (TV)	
1992	A Murderous Affair: The Carolyn Warmus Story (TV)	
1992	Mad at the Moon	
1992	Amy Fisher: My Story (TV)	
1993	Survive the Night (TV)	producer
1993	Gregory K (TV)	
1993	Body Snatchers	producer
1993	Acting on Impulse (TV)	
1993	Shattered Trust: The Shari Karney Story (TV)	
1994	Snowbound: The Jim and Jennifer Stolpa Story (TV)	
1994	The Babymaker: The Dr. Cecil Jacobson Story (TV)	
1994	Against Their Will: Women in Prison (TV)	
1994	Madonna: Innocence Lost (TV)	
1994	A Christmas Romance (TV)	
1995	Deadlocked: Escape from Zone 14 (TV)	
1995	Degree of Guilt (TV)	
1995	A Holiday to Remember (TV)	
1996	Mountain of Fear	
1996	Shattered Mind (TV)	
1996	Devil's Food (TV)	
1996	Undue Influence (TV)	
1996	To Brave Alaska (TV)	
1996	A Holiday for Love (TV)	
1997	…First Do No Harm (TV)	
1997	Lies He Told (TV)	
1997	All the Winters That Have Been (TV)	
1997	The Third Twin (TV)	
1997	I'll Be Home for Christmas (TV)	
1998	Flood: A River's Rampage (TV)	
1998	My Father's Shadow: The Sam Sheppard Story (TV)	
1999	Mind Prey (TV)	producer
1999	Judgment Day: The Ellie Nesler Story (TV)	
1999	Spenser: Small Vices (TV)	
1999	Ricky Nelson: Original Teen Idol (TV)	
1999	As Time Runs Out (TV)	
1999	Secret of Giving (TV)	
1999	A Holiday Romance (TV)	
2000	In the Name of the People (TV)	
2000	The Golden Spiders: A Nero Wolfe Mystery (TV)	
2000	Daydream Believers: The Monkees' Story (TV)	
2000	Deliberate Intent (TV)	
2000	Thin Air (TV)	
2000	The Stalking of Laurie Show (TV)	
2001	South Pacific (TV)	
2001	The Judge (TV)	
2001	Dr. Quinn, Medicine Woman: The Heart Within (TV)	
2001	Class Warfare (TV)	
2001	Walking Shadow (TV)	
2001	The Sons of Mistletoe (TV)	
2001–2002	100 Centre Street (TV series)	producer
2001–2002	A Nero Wolfe Mystery (TV series)	
2002	The Rosa Parks Story (TV)	
2002	Gilda Radner: It's Always Something (TV)	
2002	A Family's Decision (TV)	
2003	Benedict Arnold: A Question of Honor (TV)	
2003	Hunger Point (TV)	
2003	Sounder (TV)	
2003	Martha, Inc.: The Story of Martha Stewart (TV)	
2003	Ice Bound: A Woman's Survival at the South Pole (TV)	
2003	Hollywood Wives: The New Generation (TV)	
2003	Word of Honor (TV)	
2003	Undercover Christmas (TV)	
2003	Picking Up & Dropping Off (TV)	
2004	I Want to Marry Ryan Banks (TV)	producer
2004	It Must Be Love (TV)	
2004	She's Too Young (TV)	
2004	The Survivors Club (TV)	
2004	Behind the Camera: The Unauthorized Story of Charlie's Angels (TV)	
2004	10.5 (TV)	
2004	Evel Knievel (TV)	
2004	The Brooke Ellison Story (TV)	
2005	Odd Girl Out (TV)	
2005	Elvis (TV)	
2005	Faith of My Fathers (TV)	
2005	Cyber Seduction: His Secret Life (TV)	
2005	The Engagement Ring (TV)	
2005	Recipe for a Perfect Christmas (TV)	
2006	10.5: Apocalypse (TV)	
2006	Touch the Top of the World (TV)	
2006	Not Like Everyone Else (TV)	
2006	Firestorm: Last Stand at Yellowstone (TV)	
2007	The Party Never Stops: Diary of a Binge Drinker (TV)	
2007	Write & Wrong (TV)	
2007	Custody (TV)	
2007	Nature of the Beast (TV)	
2007	More of Me (TV)	
2007	Impact (TV)	
2008	Jack and Jill vs. the World (TV)	
2008	The Memory Keeper's Daughter (TV)	
2008	The Tenth Circle (TV)	
2009	Stranger with My Face (TV)	
2009	The Informant!	producer
2009	Christmas in Canaan (TV)	
2010	Ice Castles	
2010	Double Wedding (TV)	
2010	The Client List (TV)	
2010	Bond of Silence (TV)	
2010	Avalon High (TV)	
2011	Aux Presents: South by Southwest (TV)	
2011	Texas Killing Fields (TV)	
2011	Certain Prey (TV)	
2012–2013	The Client List (TV series)	
2013	Romeo Killer: The Chris Porco Story (TV)	
2014	The Grim Sleeper (TV)	

=== Writer ===
Year	Title	Notes
2001–2002	A Nero Wolfe Mystery (TV series)	"The Doorbell Rang" "The Silent Speaker"

=== Director ===
Year	Title	Notes
2002	A Nero Wolfe Mystery (TV series)	"The Silent Speaker"

== Awards ==
- 2005, Winner, Christopher Award
  The Brooke Ellison Story
- 2005, Nominee, Primetime Emmy Award
  Elvis
  Outstanding Miniseries
- 2008, Nominee, Primetime Emmy Award
  The Memory Keeper's Daughter
  Outstanding Made-for-Television Movie
