= Growing Up Twisted =

- Created by: Dee Snider
- Starring: Dee Snider; Suzette Snider; Jesse Snider; Shane Snider; Cody Snider; Cheyenne Snider
- Country of origin: United States
- Original language: English
- No. of seasons: 1
- No. of episodes: 7

Production
- Production location: United States
- Running time: 23 minutes

Original release
- Network: A&E
- Release: July 27 – August 27, 2010

Growing Up Twisted is an American reality television series that premiered on A&E on July 27, 2010. The show follows the life of Twisted Sister vocalist Dee Snider, his wife Suzette to whom he's been married since October 21, 1981, and their four children, Jesse (Born 1982), Shane (Born 1988), Cody (Born 1989), and Cheyenne (Born 1996). The show is similar to Gene Simmons Family Jewels in that it follows a rock star and his family through their everyday lives. Season one ran from July 27, 2010 until August 24, 2010.

== Episodes ==
=== Season 1 (2010) ===
Series episode	Season episode	Title	Original airdate
1	1	"Baptism by Snider"	July 27, 2010
2	2	"Carpet and Drapes"	July 27, 2010
3	3	"Are Those Real?"	August 3, 2010
4	4	"Empty Nest"	August 3, 2010
5	5	"I Still Wanna Rock"	August 10, 2010
6	6	"Uneasy Riders"	August 17, 2010
7	7	"Mommy's Boys"	August 24, 2010
