= A Christmas Romance =

- DVD cover
- Genre: Comedy; Drama; Family
- Based on: A Christmas Romance by Maggie Davis
- Written by: Darrah Cloud
- Directed by: Sheldon Larry
- Starring: Olivia Newton-John; Gregory Harrison; Chloe Lattanzi; Stephanie Sawyer
- Music by: Peter Manning Robinson
- Country of origin: United States
- Original language: English

Production
- Executive producers: Robert Dalrymple; Michael Jaffe; Howard Braunstein
- Producers: Sheldon Larry; Joseph Plager; Matthew O'Connor
- Production location: Maple Ridge, British Columbia
- Cinematography: Richard Leiterman
- Editor: Barbara Pokras
- Running time: 94 minutes
- Production companies: Dalrymple Production; Jaffe/Braunstein Films; Spectacor Films

Original release
- Network: CBS
- Release: December 18, 1994

A Christmas Romance is a 1994 American made-for-television Christmas romantic drama film directed by Sheldon Larry and starring Olivia Newton-John, Gregory Harrison and Chloe Lattanzi, Newton-John's real-life daughter. It was written by Darrah Cloud based on the novel A Christmas Romance by Maggie Davis. The film was shot on location in Vancouver, British Columbia, Canada and originally premiered on CBS on December 18, 1994.

Newton-John also sings the song "The Way of Love" in the opening and closing credits, a track taken from her 1994 album Gaia: One Woman's Journey.

== Summary ==
Julia Stonecypher (Olivia Newton-John) is a widow with two young daughters – Deenie and Emily Rose (Chloe Lattanzi and Stephanie Sawyer) – who struggles to keep up financially and loses her job just days before Christmas. To make matters worse, Brian Harding (Gregory Harrison), an upscale banker from the city, comes to visit Julia to tell her that her house is being repossessed and she will be homeless; Julia is unable to pay.

When Brian takes off into a snowstorm, his car slides into a ditch and he is injured. Julia allows him into her home to recuperate despite his surly attitude and the four of them are trapped together in the isolated house. But as they wait out the storm, Brian begins to have a change of heart and an unlikely romance flares up between him and Julia, fueled by the atmosphere of Christmas time.

== Cast ==
- Olivia Newton-John as Julia Stonecypher
- Gregory Harrison as Brian Harding
- Chloe Lattanzi as Deenie Stonecypher
- Stephanie Sawyer as Emily Rose Stonecypher
- Tom Heaton as Mel Betsill
- Stephen E. Miller as Bert Betsill
- Brent Stait as O.T. Betsill
- Susan Astley as Margie Peterson
- Tom McBeath as Mr. Macklin
- Anna Ferguson as Old Woman
- Melody Ryane as Felicity

== Reception ==
=== Ratings ===
The film was watched by 25.5 million people and placed 6th for the week in total viewers.

== DVD release ==
On September 13, 2011, A Christmas Romance was released on Region 1 DVD by Echo Bridge Home Entertainment.
