= Jesse Blaze Snider =

American writer, voice actor and musician (born 1982)

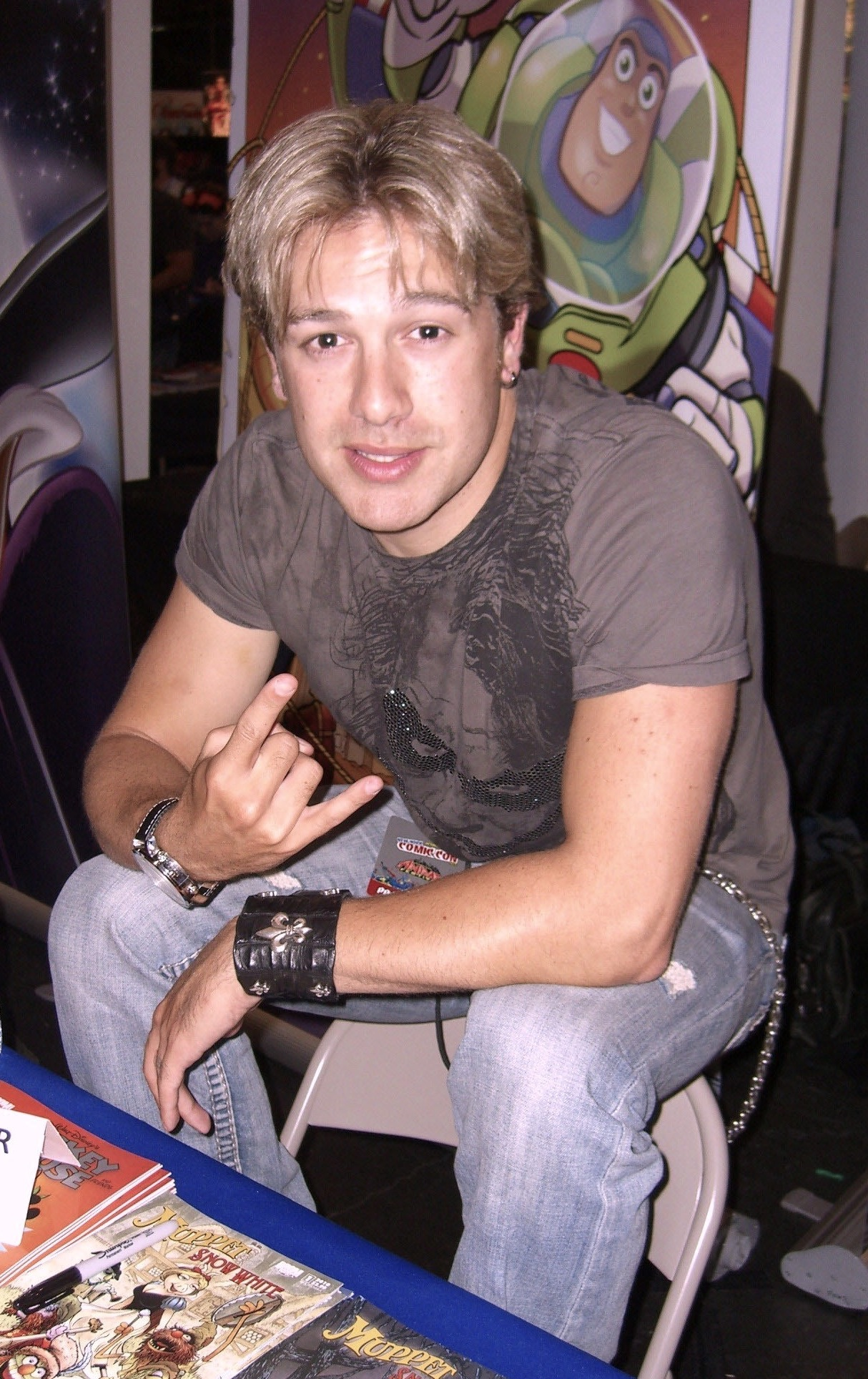
- Snider in 2010
- Born: September 19, 1982 (age 44)
- Notable works: Creator of the Dead Romeo graphic novel series, writer of Evil Ernie 2012 reboot
- Spouse: Patti (m. 2007)
- Children: 4

Jesse Blaze Snider (born September 19, 1982) is an American comic book writer, voice-over actor, TV and radio host, and rock musician. He is the eldest son of Twisted Sister frontman and vocalist Dee Snider.

== Hosting ==
Snider has hosted MTV2 Rock, The MTV2 Rock Countdown, as well as shows on Fuse TV and HBO. He was the host of Haunted Live on the Travel Channel until the end of 2018.

He was a radio DJ on 98.5 The Bone and on WLIR-FM.

He also co-hosted the last installments of Qore, an interactive online magazine from PlayStation Network for the PlayStation 3.

== Narration and voice work ==
Snider has been the narrator of Food Paradise for the Travel Channel since 2014 and has done narration for Museum Secrets (Smithsonian Channel).

He has served as the voice of Pizza Hut, GameStop, and Cheetos.

== Music ==
Snider was the music consultant for Dee Snider's film Strangeland (1998).

In 2008, Snider appeared on the reality television singing competition Rock the Cradle, which featured the offspring of famous singers competing against one another. Snider came in second place, behind winner Crosby Loggins.

=== Discography ===
Snider wrote and performed "G.U.T.", the theme song to his family's reality show Growing Up Twisted (2010), and "Rock 'n' Roll Ain't Dead", which he performed with his father Dee on the show. The song "Go With Me", written for his eldest daughter's christening, was featured on the show.

In 2012, he released the single "Twisted," which would eventually appear on the album The Slip: Love Songs from a Serial Killer, produced by Matt Squire and GoodWill & MGI, among others.

His single "Crank it Up" was featured on ESPN coverage of NCAA college football in 2012.

In November 2014, the single "Promised Land," co-written with Frederick Scott and performed by Snider, was featured on Monday Night Football. The music video was directed by John Herzfeld.

The soundtrack to the film Reach Me (2014) features the song "Alive," written and performed by Snider. John Herzfeld, who wrote and directed the film, directed the music video.

Snider wrote and performed the theme song "Juggernaut" for The Movie Crypt podcast. The song was subsequently used as the international theme song to the related TV series Holliston.

In 2016, Snider won in the Novelty/Comedy category of the USA Songwriting Competition with his song "Fight to Death". The song won 3rd overall grand prize. That same year he was named one of Music Connection's Hot 100 Live Unsigned Artists & Bands. His song "Got Your Number" was featured on ESPN's First Take in March 2016. That year he released his debut album 16, which included the songs "Crank it Up", "G.U.T.", "Go With Me", and "Rock 'n' Roll Ain't Dead".

His album Come With Me If You Want to Live was released in 2020.

== Comic books ==
Snider's first professional work in comics was writing a Deadpool short called "Fun With Ninjas" (Marvel Comics Presents, volume 2 #10, August 2008).

In 2009, Snider created the Dead Romeo graphic novel series. On December 9, 2009, the first issue of an ongoing Toy Story comic from Boom! Studios written by Snider was released. He wrote a four-issue prequel to the motion picture Strangeland for Fangoria Graphix called Strangeland: Seven Sins, though only the first issue of the series was released before Fangoria went bankrupt.

In 2010 Snider wrote the Marvel One-Shot installment Hulk: Let the Battle Begin. He wrote the reboot issues of the comic series Evil Ernie, drawn by Jason Craig, the first of which was released in October 2012.

On October 12, 2016, Snider released Black Light District: 6 Issues from Image Comics, a combination of comic book and soundtrack. It features six short stories based on the six tracks from his EP album of the same name.

== Personal life ==
Snider and wife Patti (m. 2007) are parents of four children.
