= Dead Romeo =

DC Comics comic book series

Dead Romeo is a comic book series from DC Comics, written by Jesse Blaze Snider with art by Ryan Benjamin. The series, begun in April 2009, follows the journey of the undead rock star, Jonathan Romero (aka "Dead Romeo") as he attempts to save his lover, Whisper, from certain death.

== Synopsis ==
Jonathan Romero, aka "Dead Romeo", was the lead singer of the '80s rock band The Dead Romeos. The story follows John Romero, a glam rock musician who died in the 1980s, but not before falling madly in love, marrying his sweetheart and becoming a vampire. Romero returns from Hell in the present day with a chance to escape forever. All he has to do is kill one innocent virgin. But can the hopeless romantic rock singer do such a terrible thing? And if he can't, what will his Hellish companions, the evil Hollywood Vampires, do to John if he chokes?. Now he's back on Earth and he has a difficult choice to make: Kill his true love and earn his permanent release from eternal damnation – or protect her and burn for eternity. Either way, someone will have to die.
