= DC Comics Two Thousand =

Two-issue miniseries by DC Comics

Publication information
- Publisher: DC Comics
- Schedule: Monthly
- Format: Limited series
- Genre: Superhero
- Publication date: January – February 2000
- No. of issues: 2
- Main characters: Justice League; Justice Society of America; T. O. Morrow

Creative team
- Written by: Tom Peyer
- Penciller: Val Semeiks
- Inker: Prentis Rollins
- Letterer: Kurt Hathaway
- Colorists: Heroic Age; John Kalisz
- Editors: Tony Bedard; Dan Raspler

DC Comics Two Thousand, also known as DC Two Thousand and DC 2000, is a two-issue miniseries by DC Comics in which the Justice League of America and the Justice Society of America team up, via time travel, to stop the attempts of T. O. Morrow to alter the present by changing the past. The two issues of the series were released in January and February 2000, in prestige format.

== Synopsis ==
=== Issue #1 ===
In the year 2000, T. O. Morrow is the ruler of the world, as a result of using a time-travel machine called M.O.R.R.O.W. to strategically send pieces of modern technology (a laptop, an artificial heart, et cetera) to specific places in the year 1941. In the past, the newly formed Justice Society is investigating the mysterious technological devices they have encountered, when a group of heroes from 2000—The Justice League—arrives, determined to take back the future devices and restore their time-period. The JSA's Spectre looks into the JLA members' minds, and sees the worst parts of the future (e.g., the dismantling of New Deal programs, causing the poor to suffer greatly). Rather than allow that future to occur, the Spectre imprisons the JLA members in 1941.

=== Issue #2 ===
The League members escape their imprisonment and return to 2000, where Morrow's citadel is being attacked by descendants of the JSA; made corrupt by unearned power, the heirs of the Society intend to hijack M.O.R.R.O.W. for their own purposes. In 1941, most of the JSA members plan to use Morrow's technology to improve the world, but the Flash (Jay Garrick) tries to tell them that it is wrong to do so. Later, Flash stops the future Morrow from killing his own mother in the past; he had intended to make himself "tougher" by having been an orphan, but Flash shows him that this is a line even Morrow cannot cross.

The JSA travels to the year 2000 and sees what has happened to the world as a result of Morrow's efforts and their own. With Morrow's help, they use M.O.R.R.O.W. to take back all the year-2000 devices that had been sent to 1941, thus restoring the future.
