= June Ambrose =

American costume designer and stylist

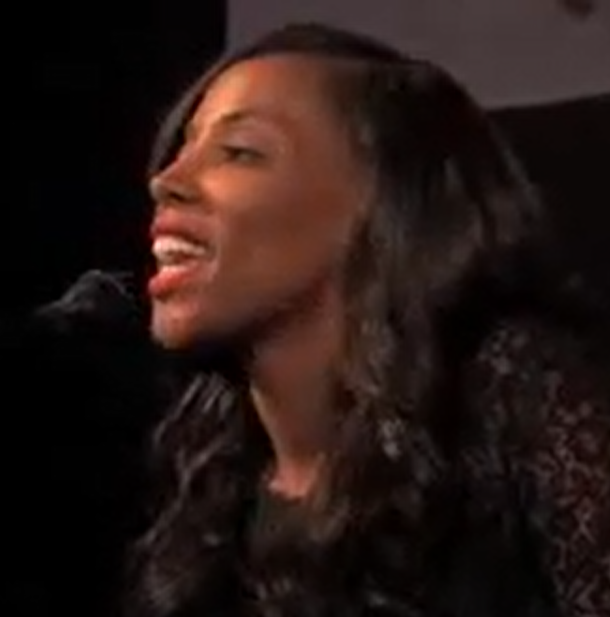
- Ambrose in 2018
- Born: June 5, 1971 (age 55); Antigua
- Known for: Costume design for The Rain (Supa Dupa Fly); Mo Money Mo Problems music videos
- Notable work: Designed the first Puma women's basketball clothing line in 2021
- Spouse: Marc Chamblin
- Children: 2
- Website: www.juneambrose.com

June Ambrose (born 5 June 1971) is an Antiguan-born American stylist, costume designer, author, creative director, influencer, and TV host. She is currently the creative director of women's basketball for Puma. Ambrose is best known for styling prominent hip hop and rhythm and blues artists in high fashion pieces and was one of the first designers to do so, most notably for artists such as Missy Elliott and Jay-Z in popular 1990s music videos. Ambrose was born in Antigua in 1971 and grew up in The Bronx. She attended Talent Unlimited High School and after graduation worked for a brief period in investment banking before interning at MCA Records where she began styling new artists. Ambrose has designed for over 200 music videos and was the costume designer for the 1998 film Belly and a stylist on The X Factor. She published her book, Effortless Style, in 2006 and in 2012 hosted her own reality television show on VH1. Ambrose was hired at Puma in 2020 and in December 2021 released her first fashion line, High Court, which is also the first-ever women's basketball clothing line released by the company.

== Early life ==
Ambrose was born in June 1971 in Antigua and grew up in a one-bedroom apartment in the Bronx with her mother and sister. She recalls interest in fashion at an early age, when she began cutting up her grandmother's curtains to design dresses for her Barbie dolls and produced fashion shows for the parents of her early school classmates.

She attended Talent Unlimited High School at the Julia Richman Education Complex where she began designing costumes for theater productions. After graduation, she went to work as an office administrator at S. G. Warburg & Co. for two years before securing an internship at MCA Records where she began styling artists for the label.

== Career ==
Ambrose's work at MCA quickly led to positions styling for more well-known artists on global tours. She describes being initially inspired by "Japanese animation and old movies" and as of 2021 has designed for over 200 music videos, most notably creating Missy Elliott's patent leather blow-up bodysuit in "The Rain (Supa Dupa Fly)"; Sean "Diddy" Combs' suit in "Mo Money Mo Problems" and Busta Rhymes' kaftan in "Put Your Hands Where My Eyes Could See".

=== Celebrity clients ===
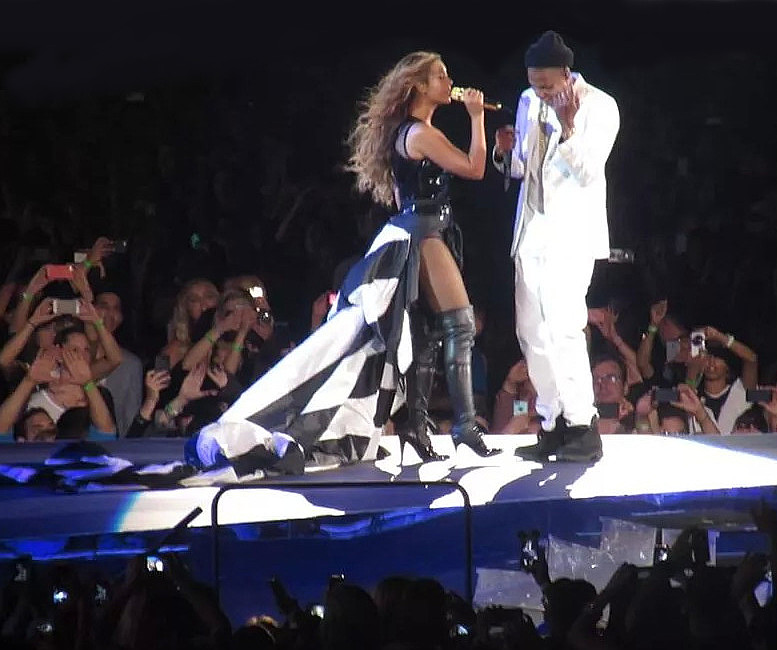
Ambrose designed wardrobes for Jay-Z, a long-time friend, for the On the Run (2014) and On the Run II (2018) tours.

In addition to Elliott, Combs and Rhymes, Ambrose has been a Costume Designer for

- Jay Z
- Mary J. Blige
- Enrique Iglesias
- Backstreet Boys
- Will Smith
- Mariah Carey
- Alicia Keys
- Busta Rhymes
- Jamie Foxx
- Zoe Saldaña
- Jason Derulo

She has also designed notable looks for her long-time friend and collaborator Jay-Z, including his wardrobes for the On the Run and On the Run II tours and his suits for Black Is King.

=== Film, television and print ===
Ambrose was the costume designer for the 1998 film Belly, directed by Hype Williams, with whom she frequently collaborated, and a stylist for The X-Factor in 2011. In 2012 she debuted Styled by June, a VH1 reality show in which Ambrose worked with celebrities who had "lost their swagger" to rebuild and rehabilitate their style. Her book, Effortless Style, was released in 2006.

=== Creative director at Puma ===
In October 2020, Puma announced that Ambrose would be joining them as creative director of Puma Hoops. Jay-Z had been the creative director for the brand's basketball line since 2018, and he introduced Ambrose to CEO Bjørn Gulden and director of brand and marketing Adam Petrick. Ambrose released High Court, a 25-piece women's basketball collection, in December 2021, her first fashion line and the first women's basketball line ever released by the company.

== Impact on the fashion industry ==
Ambrose is frequently credited with bringing high fashion together with the hip hop/R&B sphere:

“She took guys who were only used to wearing Timberland boots and baggy jeans, and put them in cuff links and Tom Ford suits.”
~Swizz Beatz, 2011

and, conversely, bringing streetwear to fashion runways. Some industry figures credit Ambrose's background in costuming, as opposed to traditional training as a high fashion designer, with her ability to create original intersections between the design fields.
