= Over Your Dead Body (novel) =

2016 horror novel by Dan Wells

- Author: Dan Wells
- Cover artist: Peter Lutjen
- Language: English
- Series: John Cleaver Second Trilogy
- Genre: Horror
- Published: 2016, Tor Books
- Publication place: United States
- Pages: 303
- Award: 2016 AML Award for Best Novel
- ISBN: 9780765380685
- OCLC: 948838578
- Preceded by: The Devil's Only Friend
- Followed by: Nothing Left to Lose

Over Your Dead Body is a 2016 horror novel by Dan Wells published by Tor Books. It is the fifth book of six in Wells's John Cleaver series. Set a year after the conclusion of The Devil's Only Friend, the book continues the story of sociopathic teenage protagonist John Wayne Cleaver and his best friend Brooke as they drift around the Midwestern U.S. in search of a network of supernatural killers called "the Withered." Brooke has dissociative identity disorder after surviving demonic possession, and her alternate personalities are key to discovering the other demons. The majority of critics approved of this fifth addition to the series, and the book won the 2016 AML Award for Best Novel. It is followed by the sixth and final novel in the John Cleaver series, Nothing Left to Lose.

== Development ==
For this fifth installment of John's story, Wells continued the character's second arc of learning how to cope with his emotions after discovering them in the first trilogy. He told Deseret News in 2016 that Over Your Dead Body was his most challenging writing experience yet because of the "aimless" feeling he wanted the story of John and Brooke on the road to have. Wells said that writing a "wandering story without the book itself feeling directionless proved even harder, far harder than [he] had expected it to be." He wanted the novel to "take John in a completely new direction again" after the events of The Devil's Only Friend. He also cited Brooke's character as "especially tricky to get right."

== Plot summary ==
John and Brooke are now on their own: hungry, dirty, and hunting down the "Withered" (demons in human form) using Brooke's memories from when she was possessed. They rely on stashes of supplies and money that Agent Potash, one of John's FBI team members, had stored before his death. Wanted by the FBI, the pair have been hitchhiking to different cities and towns for a year. They find a commune where the demon Yashodh is the leader, and John kills him quickly with a gun. They then move on to their next destination – the small town of Dillon, Oklahoma – and when they arrive, a new personality manifests itself through Brooke: Marci, John's former girlfriend who was killed by the demon Nobody. This proves to be extremely difficult for him; he is able to talk to the dead girl he loves, but she is trapped in Brooke's body and often gets replaced by the other personalities. Meanwhile, John struggles with the temptation to kill anyone who gets in their way.

They move on to Dallas, where John notices they are being followed by a black SUV, which they assume is the FBI. A news report then reveals that a gruesome murder just occurred in Dillon, the town John and Brooke just left. They go back and make friends with a teenage boy named Corey (who they suspect is the demon Attina) and two sisters: Brielle and Jessica. The next day, both Jessica and Corey are found dead. John suspects that Attina is reading his mind. Then, Brooke has a suicidal episode, and the police seize her and John; they are sent to a hospital, where FBI Agent Mills shows up. He takes them back to Dillon to try to stop Attina, and when they arrive, they find two more people dead. One was the pedophile police officer who was found with Jessica the night of her murder, and Brielle is presented as the primary suspect; John had even heard her vow to kill the predator if he ever did anything to her sister.

John is frustrated with his inability to figure out Attina, and postulates that he's driving the people in the town crazy enough to kill each other. He immediately tries to get Brooke to safety, but the demon – in the form of a giant monster – captures her. Desperate, John follows his idea that Brielle is Attina. He goes to her house, holding her family at gunpoint to get information, but finds Brielle's body in her room, killed the exact way another Dillon citizen proposed. Finally, he realizes that his theory was backwards: Attina isn't forcing the townspeople to murder, the townspeople's dark desires are driving Attina to action – and John himself started it all with his murderous thoughts. He realizes that Beth is Attina and finds the Withered in a farmhouse outside of the town, mirroring Brooke's inclination to kill herself, and helps Attina start the fire that serves as its suicide. Once it is all over, John takes Brooke back to their hometown of Clayton to be with her parents and get the care she needs. She protests and wants to stay with him, asserting that she loves him. John loves both her and Marci, tells her so, and leaves the town still unable to forgive himself for getting both girls involved in his supernatural war in the first place.

== Reception ==
Reviews of Over Your Dead Body were mostly complimentary; the majority of reviewers thought it a worthy addition to Wells's series. A San Francisco Book Review writer approved of the continuation of John's story and called the novel "an intriguingly fabulous mix of serial killer horror, supernatural beings, and dark humor." Alternative Magazine Online's review echoed similar ideas, saying: "Over Your Dead Body is yet another superb installment in the John Wayne Cleaver series that echoes the delightful eeriness of the earlier books while exploring exciting new territory." Publishers Weekly called the novel a "strong fifth entry" that proved to be "much richer than a simple monster vs. monster story." David Pitt for Booklist wrote: "For fans of the series, the book is a superlative must-read, although newcomers should probably start at the beginning. Still, this one’s very fine indeed."

== Awards and nominations ==
- 2016 AML Award for Best Novel
- 2016 Whitney Award finalist for Speculative Fiction
- 2016 Goodreads Choice Award nominee for Horror

== See also ==
- I Am Not a Serial Killer
- I Am Not a Serial Killer (film)
- Mr. Monster
- I Don't Want to Kill You
