= Fictional portrayals of psychopaths and sociopaths =

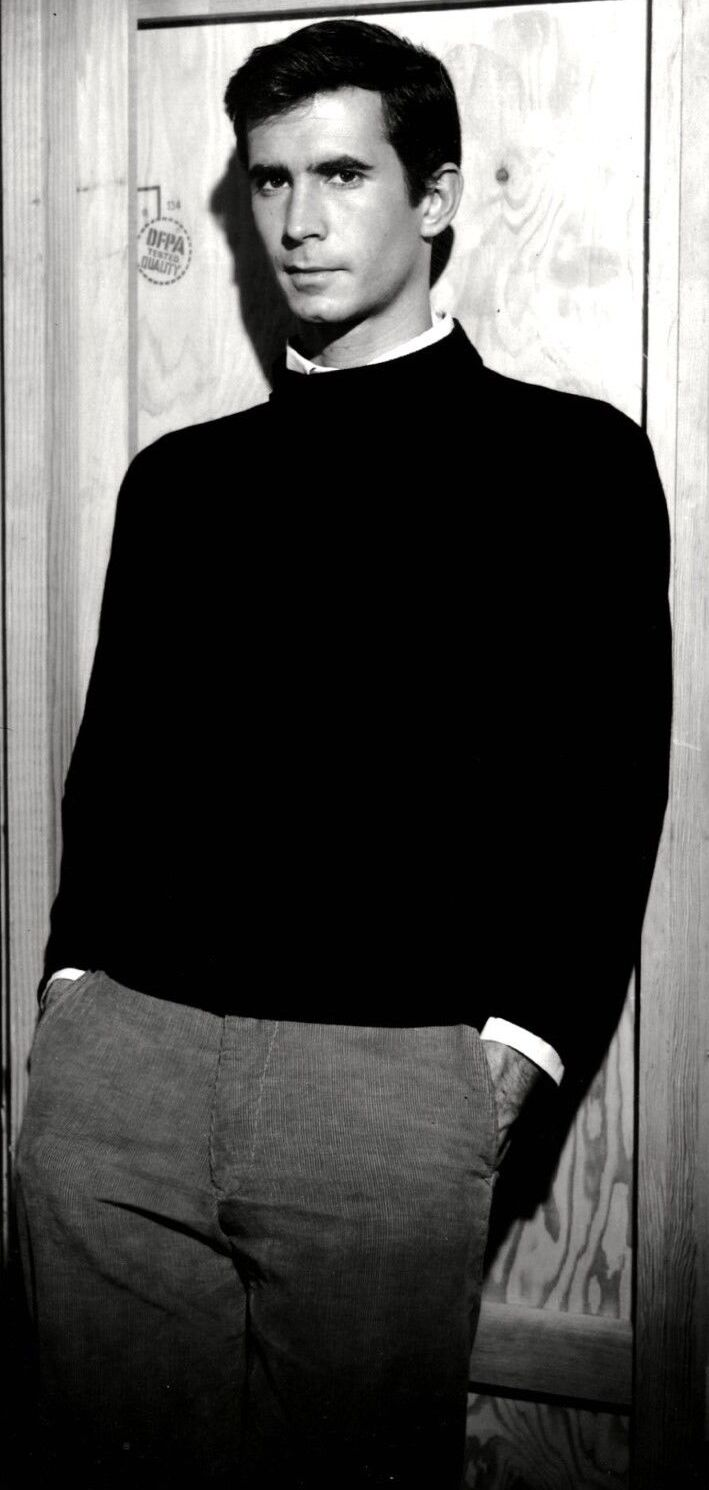
Anthony Perkins as Norman Bates from the Psycho franchise, a notable psychopathic fictional character

Fictional portrayals of psychopaths and sociopaths are some of the most notorious in film and literature but may only vaguely or partly relate to the concept of psychopathy, which is itself used with varying definitions by mental health professionals, criminologists and others. The character may be identified as a diagnosed/assessed psychopath or sociopath within the fictional work itself, or by its creator when discussing their intentions with the work, which might be distinguished from opinions of audiences or critics based only on a character appearing to show traits or behaviors associated with an undefined popular stereotype of psychopathy.

Such characters are often portrayed in an exaggerated fashion and typically in the role of a villain or antihero, where the general characteristics of a psychopath are useful to facilitate conflict and danger. Because the definitions and criteria in the history of psychopathy have varied over the years and continue to change even now, many characters in notable films may have been designed to fall under the category of a psychopath at the time of the film's production or release, but not necessarily in subsequent years. There are several stereotypical images of psychopathy in both lay and professional accounts which only partly overlap and can involve contradictory traits: the charming con artist, the deranged serial killer, the successful corporate psychopath, or the chronic low-level offender with juvenile delinquency. Contrary to many of these typical Machiavellian portrayals of psychopaths, in real-life they tend to be far less effective, often believing they’re masterfully controlling others, when in reality they are not. The public concept reflects some combination of fear of the mythical bogeyman, fascination with human evil, and sometimes perhaps envy of people who might appear to go through life unencumbered by the same levels of guilt, anguish or insecurity.

== History ==
For a more comprehensive film list, see List of films featuring psychopaths and sociopaths

=== 19th century ===
In the 19th century the diagnostic categories of monomania or moral insanity (the word 'moral' then meant either emotional or ethical) made their way into works of literature, covering numerous eccentricities, obsessions or breakdowns—and sometimes acts of apparently senseless criminality, occasionally violent. This period also saw the rise of crime fiction such as sensation novels, where often someone in a local community who appeared normal would turn out to be criminally insane, and detective novels, playing on increasing anxieties about the characters of people in the newly expanding and diversifying industrial cities. The term 'psychopath' came into use in the late 19th century (as did the term it would often be confused with, psychotic), and also spanned a very wide range of conditions (etymologically and originally equivalent to 'mentally ill'). Nevertheless, an early rise to prominence followed its use in a Russian trial between 1883 and 1885 concerning a child murder, contributing to the release of a probable false confessor while the original suspect was found guilty. 'Psychopaths' began to appear in vaudevilles, ditties (songs) and press articles. The psychopathy defense was reported internationally as having enabled a remorseless female child killer to go free, a usage still quoted in dictionaries today.

'Degenerates' were also depicted in popular fiction of the 19th through to mid 20th century, sometimes in similar ways to the modern usages of the concept of psychopaths, sometimes being cited as a cause of psychopathy. The concept fell into disrepute due partly to its use by the Nazis to justify eradicating their opposition.

=== 20th century ===
==== Early 20th century ====
The meaning gradually narrowed, initially as 'psychopathic inferiors' covering all of what today might be called personality disorders and various other conditions, then intertwining with the terminology of the 'sociopath' (and eventually antisocial personality disorder), though psychopathy remained variously defined in both broad and narrow ways.

Early representations of psychopaths in film were often caricatured as sadistic, unpredictable, sexually depraved, and emotionally unstable (manic) characters with a compulsion to engage in random violence and destruction, usually with a series of bizarre mannerisms such as giggling, laughing, or facial tics. Up until the late 1950s, cinematic conventions usually relegated the psychopath to roles of genre villains such as gangsters, mad scientists, supervillains, and many types of generic criminals. Examples of this type are Pinkie Brown (Richard Attenborough) in Brighton Rock, Tommy Udo (Richard Widmark) in Kiss of Death, Cody Jarrett (James Cagney) in White Heat, and Antonio 'Tony' Camonte (Paul Muni) in the 1932 version of Scarface. Homosexuals were also referred to as psychopaths under the broad definition then in use; the American Psychiatric Association in the first Diagnostic and Statistical Manual of Mental Disorders in 1952 would list it under 'sociopathic personality disturbance'.

One exceptional depiction in this period was the character of child murderer Hans Beckert (Peter Lorre) in the 1931 Fritz Lang film M. Lorre portrays Beckert as an outwardly unremarkable man tormented by a compulsion to ritualistically murder children. A German film (allegedly based on the real life serial killer Peter Kürten), it was released in America in 1933 and has been seen as indicative of a turning point in American media depictions of psychopaths. Until the 1930s psychiatrists typically applied the diagnosis to unemployed males or 'hypersexual' women, but several psychiatric, cultural and economic trends, together with sex crime panics, converged to transform the popular psychopath into a violent, male, sexual deviant or criminal—a threat to innocence, gender roles and the social order.

The Ostap Bender character from novels The Twelve Chairs and The Little Golden Calf by Soviet authors Ilf and Petrov is also considered a portrait of a charming psychopath.

==== Mid 20th century ====
One of the earliest real life cases which had a pervasive influence on American movies was that of Ed Gein, arrested in 1957. A farmer who had resided with his mother until her death, he had then killed two women and dug up female bodies from the local cemetery, making various items out of their skin. Rumours spread that he was also a necrophiliac, cannibal or transvestite, though these appear to have been unsupported other than by brief affirmations from Gein to leading questions by interrogators. Gein was found mentally ill and legally insane before trial, deemed to have had schizophrenia (psychosis including delusions and hallucinations) for at least 12 years, though at least one media psychiatrist dubbed him instead a 'sexual psychopath'. Robert Bloch, a prolific pulp horror author, says his 1959 novel Psycho was based on the Gein murders and the idea of an apparently sane person in a local community committing heinous crimes, but not necessarily on Gein himself, despite numerous similarities. The villain, Norman Bates, is portrayed as an outwardly unremarkable man who murders a woman while under the control of an alternate personality that takes the form of his domineering mother, whom he himself murdered. Both the novel and Alfred Hitchcock's 1960 film adaptation were influences on the popular media portrayal of psychopaths. Neither the book nor the film elaborates on the term 'psycho', though it is commonly taken to refer to mean either 'psychotic' or 'psychopathic' (despite referring to distinct constructs, the two terms can often be confounded in the public's mind and used interchangeably). At the end of the film, a psychiatrist describes Bates as having a split personality. Multiple personality disorder was at that time very popular (cf 1957 movie The Three Faces of Eve) and is to this day commonly confused with schizophrenia. Bloch later wrote a script for the 1966 film The Psychopath, the original working title for which was "Schizo".

A different thread within fictional portrayals of psychopathy continued to focus on rebelliously antisocial characters. The title of the 1955 film Rebel Without a Cause, starring James Dean, came from a 1944 book of the same name detailing the hypno-analysis of a diagnosed psychopath. In the book, psychiatrist Robert M. Lindner also discussed psychopaths in general as pointlessly selfish individuals who appear unable to accept society's rules. In Ken Kesey's 1962 novel One Flew Over the Cuckoo's Nest, Randle McMurphy, after being admitted to a mental institution, is repeatedly referred to by the authorities, other patients and himself as a possible or definite psychopath. He reads from his record: "repeated outbreaks of passion that suggest the possible diagnosis of psychopath", and adds that a doctor told him it means "I fight and fuh-pardon me, ladies-means I am he put it overzealous in my sexual relations." The current doctor then reads out the note: "Don't overlook the possibility that this man might be feigning psychosis". In the script for the popular film adaptation in 1975, only the latter is retained and the term psychopath is never used. Ironically, the main authority figure in the hospital—the cold, sadistic Nurse Ratched—was later described as a psychopath under later understandings of the term.

American mystery author Patricia Highsmith often featured psychopathic characters in her books, most notably her Ripliad series about Tom Ripley, a "suave, agreeable and utterly amoral" con artist and serial killer. In the first book, 1955's The Talented Mr. Ripley, Ripley murders a rich man and steals his identity; in four subsequent novels, he commits several murders and engages in a long-running art forgery scam, all without getting caught. Ripley has been described by several critics as a psychopath.

==== Late 20th century ====
The 1973 film Badlands involved two lead characters based loosely on Charles Starkweather and Caril Ann Fugate. While the male protagonist, spree killer Kit Carruthers (Martin Sheen), is sometimes described as a psychopath or sociopath, psychologist Robert D. Hare, a leading proponent of the assessment of psychopathy, has identified his girlfriend and accomplice Holly (Sissy Spacek) as exemplifying his concept of a psychopath due to her poor emotional sense of the meaning of events and her attempted mask of normality. However, writer and director Terrence Malick has said he considered Kit's shallow, bitter insensitivity to be a result of suffering and neglect growing up in the Midwest, and 15-year-old Holly, though immature and mis-estimating her audience, to be a quite typical Southern girl wanting to help narrate and come off well but still give the hard facts, and not dwell on herself or on personal tragedies.

The increasing media focus on serial killers in the late 20th century, fueled by cases such as John Wayne Gacy (1978), Ted Bundy (1978) and Jeffrey Dahmer (1991), lent an additional momentum to the way psychopathy was both perceived and portrayed in film and literature, sometimes incorporating a hybrid of traditional psychopaths from early film and late-19th century literature with the high-functioning behaviors detected in some serial killers.

The psychiatrist and cannibalistic serial killer Hannibal Lecter, most notably portrayed by Anthony Hopkins in the Academy Award-winning 1991 film The Silence of the Lambs, is perhaps the most infamous fictional psychopath of the 20th century. Lecter is intelligent and sophisticated and his disarming charisma and wit disguise his true nature as a serial killer. He spends most of the film in a cell, taunting FBI trainee Clarice Starling with clues to the identity of another serial killer, Buffalo Bill, in exchange for intimate details of Starling's troubled childhood. Lecter first appeared in Thomas Harris' 1981 novel Red Dragon, in which he is characterized as not fitting any known psychological profile. In the film adaptation of The Silence of the Lambs, he is referred to as a "pure psychopath". In the later novels Hannibal and Hannibal Rising, Lecter's psychopathy is portrayed as the result of seeing his sister Mischa murdered and cannibalized during World War II. In 2013 Harris revealed that he originally based the Lecter character on Alfredo Ballí Trevino, a Mexican physician who had killed and dismembered his homosexual lover, in what was called a crime of passion over a financial dispute.

The novel American Psycho tells the story of Patrick Bateman, a yuppie serial killer working on Wall Street in the 1980s. It was made into a film in 2000. Author Bret Easton Ellis has told interviewers that the book is a satire on shallow consumerist lifestyles, but also that the writing of the violent scenes was based on fictional horror and FBI material on serial killers, along with how he imagined "a psychotic who worked on Wall Street" would describe such incidents. Some commentary, including in scientific journals, has suggested the Bateman character appears to be a psychopath. However, Bateman also exhibits signs of psychosis such as hallucinations, and as such appears to be an unreliable narrator; it is left ambiguous whether Bateman is actually a serial killer, or is merely hallucinating about committing murder. In Ellis' 1998 novel Glamorama which features models-turned-terrorists a character also remarks "basically, everyone was a sociopath...and all the girls' hair was chignoned."

In the 1993 book Girl, Interrupted and its 1999 film adaptation, the character of Lisa (played by Angelina Jolie in the film) is a rebellious, antisocial young woman who is diagnosed as a sociopath.

The 1996 film Primal Fear depicts a suspected murderer who appears to have multiple personality disorder, who at the end reveals that he has been faking the disorder. In the original novel by William Diehl, the psychiatrist Molly Arrington and others repeatedly explain psychopathy and psychosis as if they are the same, inherently antisocial, condition.

Teatime, the main character of the 1996 Discworld novel Hogfather by Terry Pratchett and its 2006 film, is an assassin that kills for the sake of killing, instead of for money like most of the professional assassins in that series.

It has been postulated that Tony Soprano, the titular character of the TV series The Sopranos displays various sociopathic tendencies. Various sources point to his lack of remorse for heinous acts, emotional detachment and manipulation, and pervasive narcissism as signs.

Harry Potter author J. K. Rowling has described Lord Voldemort, the series' main villain, as "a raging psychopath, devoid of the normal human responses to other people's suffering, and there ARE people like that in the world".

=== 21st century ===
Numerous characters in television shows are informally described as psychopaths. Examples include Natalie Buxton in Bad Girls, Sean Slater and Michael Moon in EastEnders, Dexter Morgan in Dexter, Tuco Salamanca in Breaking Bad and Better Call Saul, and Frank Underwood in House of Cards.

Tana French's 2007 novel In the Woods depicts two detectives who work to hunt down child murderess Rosalind Devlin. Upon discovery, it is remarked that Devlin is a psychopath who is incapable of emotional attachment and feigns vulnerability to better manipulate people.

Anton Chigurh, the primary antagonist of the novel No Country for Old Men, is described as a "psychopathic killer." He is a relentless hitman who pursues protagonist Lewelyn Moss in order to recover two million in missing drug money. Chigurh kills almost everyone he meets and displays no empathy or conventional morals. He adheres to a warped series of principles and occasionally decides his victims fates with the flip of a coin. The film version of the character, portrayed by Javier Bardem, was rated by psychologists as the most accurate depiction of a psychopath.

Dr. Gregory House, the title character in the FOX medical-thriller House is referred to as a sociopath multiple times by several characters throughout the course of the show.

Sherlock Holmes, the lead character in the BBC series Sherlock, is referred to as a psychopath multiple times throughout the course of the show; in response to these claims, Holmes describes himself as a "high-functioning sociopath". He has also been described as having Asperger syndrome.

The Dan Wells novel I Am Not a Serial Killer and its sequels, Mr. Monster and I Don't Want to Kill You, are narrated by John Wayne Cleaver, a teenaged diagnosed sociopath who lives by a rigid code of behavior in order to avoid becoming a serial killer.

One Chicago academic has argued in a review of TV trends that the contemporary fantasy of sociopathy/psychopathy is of someone whose emotional disconnection from others in society, rather than being the hindrance that it can represent in real clinical cases, enables them to be an amazingly successful manipulator due to a breakdown in the social contract.

Vriska Serket, antihero of web fiction epic Homestuck, displays numerous traits of psychopathy, especially Machiavellianism, lack of remorse, and fearless-dominant confidence. Her friend Karkat Vantas calls her a "vile backstabbing sociopath."

Contemporary advice on writing psychopathic/sociopathic characters suggests that lack of a conscience and lack of empathy are always the chief characteristics, along with an ability to fool others, while the type of selfish antisocial behavior, and any secondary characteristics, can vary.

In 2013, the video console game Grand Theft Auto V was released with numerous references to psychopaths and sociopaths, including reports from a fictional psychiatrist. One of the lead characters, Trevor, is described both psychopathic and psychotic; the voice actor who played the part says he based his performance on Tom Hardy's portrayal of Charles Bronson in the film Bronson.

Jacob M. Appel's The Mask of Sanity depicts a high-functioning sociopath, Jeremy Balint, who gains fame as a cardiologist while killing strangers.

The character Villanelle in Killing Eve refers to herself as a psychopath. Her character portrays many of the traits of both sociopaths and psychopaths, including a lack of empathy in her methods of murdering her victims and not showing any guilt or remorse after the event.

Some characters in the fantasy television series Game of Thrones (2011-2019) have been suggested to be psychopathic, including Ramsay Bolton, Joffrey Baratheon, and Cersei Lannister.

Emma Grossman in The Bad Seed and The Bad Seed Returns is a psychopathic murderer with self-diagnosed antisocial personality disorder.

The 2019 Israeli film Incitement is a fictionalized portrayal of Israeli ultranationalist and killer Yigal Amir in the leadup to the 1995 assassination of Yitzhak Rabin, the Prime Minister of Israel. Carla Hay of CultureMixOnline.com described lead actor Yehuda Nahari's portrayal of Amir as a compelling depiction of a sociopath, with much left to audience interpretations.

== See also ==
- List of films featuring psychopaths and sociopaths
- History of psychopathy
