= The Devil's Only Friend =

2015 horror novel by Dan Wells

- Author: Dan Wells
- Cover artist: Peter Lutjen
- Language: English
- Series: John Cleaver Second Trilogy
- Genre: Horror
- Published: 2015, Tor Books
- Publication place: United States
- Media type: Print book (hardcover and paperback) e-book, audiobook
- Pages: 304
- Award: 2015 Whitney Award for Speculative Fiction
- ISBN: 9780765380661
- OCLC: 906447620
- Preceded by: I Don't Want to Kill You
- Followed by: Over Your Dead Body

The Devil's Only Friend is a 2015 horror novel by Dan Wells published by Tor Books. It tells the story of teenage sociopath John Wayne Cleaver, now seventeen years old and the member of a team of FBI agents dedicated to hunting down a network of supernatural murderers known as "the Withered." The Devil's Only Friend is the fourth book in the John Wayne Cleaver series, preceded by I Am Not a Serial Killer (2009), Mr. Monster (2010), and I Don't Want to Kill You (2011). The majority of its reviews were positive, and it was selected as the 2015 Whitney Award winner in the speculative fiction category. Translations include Spanish and German. It the first novel in the second John Cleaver trilogy, and is followed by Over Your Dead Body (2016).

== Development ==
Wells originally opposed continuing the series because he felt that "John's character arc concluded in what [he] thought was a very satisfying way." Because The Devil's Only Friend is the first book in the second John Wayne Cleaver trilogy, Wells wrote the novel in a way that newcomers to the series would be able to understand it without having to read the first three books first. He wanted to "explore the demons more," particularly their past, and to "take John in a new direction: not to repeat his character arc from the first series, but to build on it and show him grappling with new emotional problems." In addition to John, Wells "particularly enjoyed" writing the characters of Agent Potash and Elijah Sexton, who are introduced in the novel. He has also said that his close relationship with his grandfather, who was diagnosed with Alzheimer's, influenced his writing in The Devil's Only Friend.

== Plot summary ==
John and Brooke have left Clayton, the tiny North Dakota town where they grew up. Even though "Nobody", the demon who possessed Brooke, has been destroyed, the girl is still suffering from its memories. As a result, she has multiple personalities and extensive knowledge about the ancient network of demons. John and a team of FBI agents are using her recollections to hunt down this network, whom they call "the Withered." The group consists of a police detective named Kelly, a scholar named Nathan, criminal psychologist Dr. Trujillo, sniper Diana, ex-special forces soldier Potash, and ring leader Ostler. After months of hunting in the small midwestern town of Fort Bruce, more demons begin to appear, and John fears that the Withered are starting to hunt his team in return.

Their next confrontation goes awry when Kelly is killed by the target demon. John bursts in and ends its life, but loses control and stabs the body dozens of times. Their next target is Meshara, a demon in the body of a man named Elijah who consistently visits a patient with Alzheimer's. After speaking with him undercover, John hypothesizes that he isn't a killer. Next, a victim of a cannibal attack is found, and the team uses their criminal profiling skills to try to determine this new demon's weakness. It sends letters to the team, using the name "the Hunter." New evidence from Brooke suggests that there are two factions of demons who are enemies. During a police raid, the team finds John was right about Meshara/Elijah: he has no desire to kill, and even saves the humans from the other Withered. Meanwhile, John grows frustrated with his team, and feels that he could work more effectively on his own. He begins communicating with the Hunter in secret.

Their next letter from the Hunter reveals the deep, dark secrets of each member of the team. John figures out that the Hunter has faked being a cannibal to throw them off the scent of who he really is: the king demon Rack, whose defining characteristic is his lack of a mouth and heart. The team and a police security detail break into Rack's house, but it goes horribly wrong. Ostler, Diana, and all the officers are killed. John calls Nathan and tells him to protect Brooke because he thinks Dr. Trujillo is a traitor. The three find Elijah, but shortly after they do, Potash shows up and kills him. While John confronts his team member, Nathan sneaks up from behind and shoots Potash in the head. It is revealed that Nathan, the true traitor, killed Dr. Trujillo and informed Rack of their current location. Using Brooke as a distraction, John stabs Nathan and sets a trap for Rack by embalming Nathan's body with gasoline, which will poison the Withered if he absorbs Nathan's heart. When Rack shows up, he chooses Potash's heart instead and tries to recruit John to his side and become a Withered himself. John is tempted but refuses. Rack then takes Nathan's heart and dies. John and Brooke leave town, with plans to hunt down Rack's friends.

== Reception ==
The Devil's Only Friend received mostly positive reactions, with some reviewers citing the conclusion as a weak spot. Herb Scribner for Deseret News praised the "imagery and ... vivid storytelling" present in The Devil's Only Friend, but disapproved of the amount of supporting characters and plot twists. He also called the novel's finale "almost a rushed afterthought." However, Amanda Shrum for Brigham Young University's Children's Book and Media Review deemed the ending "satisfying" and cited John Wayne Cleaver as "one of the most intriguing characters in Young Adult fiction." Marty Mulrooney for Alternative Magazine Online writes: "The only real downside of the book is that John’s reluctance to connect with the people around him can stop the reader doing so too. This makes some situations feel less impactful and also makes John seem less likable, although he remains a fascinating protagonist nonetheless." Publishers Weekly applauded the "top-notch writing and well-structured suspense elements" present in the novel. Craig Clark for Booklist also praised the prose, and added: "John's first-person narration is at once deeply disturbing and darkly humorous." A Salt Lake Magazine reviewer wrote: "Wells’ fast-paced writing style works well with the plot, which doesn't lag at any point in the novel. Even with the quick pace, Wells manages to develop well-formed characters."

== Awards and nominations ==
- 2015 Whitney Award for Speculative Fiction

== See also ==
- Dan Wells
- I Am Not a Serial Killer
- I Am Not a Serial Killer (film)
- Mr. Monster
- I Don't Want to Kill You
