= The Slow Norris =

- Developed by: Animated Extras
- Voices of: Nick Ryan; Buddie Maddicott; Gary Martin
- Theme music composer: John Du Prez
- Country of origin: United Kingdom
- Original language: English
- No. of series: 5
- No. of episodes: 60

Production
- Running time: 10 minutes
- Production companies: Hat Trick Productions, HTV

Original release
- Network: ITV (CITV)
- Release: 4 September 1995 – 23 December 1999

The Slow Norris is a British children's television programme that aired on CITV from 4 September 1995 to 23 December 1999. The programme portrayed moral tales and fables through various anthropomorphized creatures. The show was produced by HTV and Hat Trick Productions for CITV.

There was also a version produced for American television by Hollywood Ventures which ran on PBS in the fall of 1997.

== Main characters ==
- The Slow Norris (voiced by Nick Ryan) – The lead character is a large, hairy Slow loris-like creature who – although not very clever (and somewhat naive) – is willing to learn and participate in stories and activities. The Slow Norris lives in a cave-like dwelling within a forest.
- Allie (voiced by Buddie Maddicott) – As the only human character, Allie is the group's natural leader. She travels through the woods on her bicycle to visit the Slow Norris. Allie has a magic book which shows Slow Norris what things are or an animated story featuring Jane the Fairy and her frog Ferdy. Allie is voiced by Buddie Maddicott, a relation of the show's producer Dan Maddicott
- Ben Beetle (voiced by Gary Martin) – Ben Beetle is a wise insect who spends much of his time sat on a toadstool with his walking stick.
- Walter the Worm – Walter the Worm lives in a house made of mud and talks with a slight stutter.
- Jane the Fairy – An animated fairy who only appears in Allie's magic book. She wears a lilac dress and a leaf hat.
- Ferdy the Frog – He is Jane's froggy companion. He's very sensitive and bit naughty sometimes.
- Hodgehug – A baby hedgehog.
- Stork – A white stork. She appears in "Things That Fly" and is only seen throughout the 1996 series.

== Episodes ==
Episodes include one where Allie shows the Slow Norris a story of someone baking a cake, in her magic book. In another, the Slow Norris is putting off tidying the cave where he lives. Allie shows him a story involving a fairy named Jane whose house has a leak due to a hole in the roof. Jane's friend, a frog named Ferdy is supposed to fix the roof, however doesn't. The pair go out on a train journey to have a picnic with Jane's gran; they return home to find it has rained and Jane's house is now flooded. This persuades the Slow Norris to tidy his cave. In one episode, Walter the Worm loses his tail cosy, only to find later on that the Slow Norris has it. In a later series, the opening music gained lyrics sung by Allie.

=== Series 1 (1995) ===
1. Making Friends – 4 September 1995
2. Colours – 11 September 1995
3. Things With Wheels – 18 September 1995
4. Being Yourself – 25 September 1995
5. Food – 2 October 1995
6. Birthdays – 9 October 1995
7. Feeling Poorly – 16 October 1995
8. Schools – 23 October 1995
9. Where We Live – 30 October 1995
10. Being Kind – 7 November 1995
11. Games – 14 November 1995
12. Big And Small – 21 November 1995
13. Being Teased – 28 November 1995
14. 2 Legs 4 Legs 6 Legs And No Legs – 4 December 1995
15. The Slow Norris Party - 11 December 1995

=== Series 2 (1996) ===
1. Things That Fly – 9 September 1996
2. Day And Night - 16 September 1996
3. Keeping Fit – 23 September 1996
4. Being Worried – 30 September 1996
5. Penfriends – 7 October 1996
6. Things That We Wear – 14 October 1996
7. Making Music – 21 October 1996
8. Being Angry – 28 October 1996
9. Things That Grow – 4 October 1996
10. Bones – 11 November 1996
11. Things That Swim – 18 November 1996
12. Friends And Relations – 25 November 1996
13. The Shape of Things – 2 November 1996
14. Putting Things Off – 9 December 1996
15. The Four Seasons – 16 December 1996

=== Series 3 (1997) ===
1. Families 1 September 1997
2. Holidays – 8 September 1997
3. Babies – 15 September 1997
4. Pictures And Stories – 22 September 1997
5. Harvest Time – 29 September 1997
6. Dreams – 6 October 1997
7. Being Different – 13 October 1997
8. Water – 20 October 1997
9. Decorating – 27 October 1997
10. Keeping Secrets – 3 November 1997
11. Money – 10 November 1997
12. Things In The Sky 17 November 1997
13. Playing Games - 24 November 1997
14. Magic - 1 December 1997
15. Milk And Eggs - 8 December 1997
16. Sizes – 15 December 1997

=== Puppeteers ===
- David Barclay -
- Mike Quinn -
- Karen Prell – Slow Norris (facial puppeteer), Walter the Worm
- Helena Smee
- Katherine Smee -
- Michael Bayliss – Allie
- Rebecca Nagan
- Jeremy Stockwell
- Simon Buckley
- Alison McGowen
- Rebecca Clow
- Margaret O’Flaherty

=== Voices ===
- Buddie Maddicott – Allie
- Gary Martin – Ben Beetle
- Nick Ryan – Slow Norris
