= Thurl =

Thurl is a given name. Notable people with the name include:

- Thurl Bailey (born 1961), American basketball player
- Thurl Ravenscroft (1914–2005), American voice actor and basso profundo
- Gunther Thurl, a fictional character in the webcomic Schlock Mercenary
