= Nick Ryan =

Irish film producer and director

- Notable work: The Summit, A Lonely Sky, The German, Electric Picnic: The Documentary,

Nick Ryan is a film director and producer from Dublin, Ireland. Ryan directed A Lonely Sky (2006), The German (2008), Electric Picnic: The Documentary (2008), and the award-winning documentary The Summit (2012); In 2016 he produced the award winning Feature I Am Not A Serial Killer directed by Billy O'Brien starring Max Records and Christopher Lloyd; he was also the producer for Ruairi Robinson's short films The Silent City, BlinkyTM, and Corporate Monster. In 1995 he and two others founded Image Now Films, where they worked on commercials and graphic design. In 2018 he established Titan II Films

== Filmography ==
Short film

| Year | Title | Director | Producer | Writer |
|---|---|---|---|---|
| 2000 | Are We Alone | Yes | Yes | Yes |
| 2006 | A Lonely Sky | Yes | Yes | Yes |
| 2006 | The Silent City | No | Yes | No |
| 2008 | The German | Yes | Yes | Yes |
| 2008 | Uncle Bill's Barrel | No | Yes | No |
| 2011 | BlinkyTM | No | Yes | No |
| 2019 | Corporate Monster | No | Yes | No |

Documentary film

| Year | Title | Director | Producer |
|---|---|---|---|
| 2006 | Electric Picnic 2005 | Yes | Yes |
| 2007 | Electric Picnic 2006 | Yes | Yes |
| 2008 | Electric Picnic 2007 | Yes | Yes |
| 2012 | The Summit | Yes | Yes |

Film producer

- I Am Not a Serial Killer (2016)

== Awards ==
Nick Ryan's 2012 documentary The Summit was nominated for and received several awards. In 2012 it was nominated for the Grierson Award at the London Film Festival. In 2013 it was nominated for the Grand Jury Prize at the Sundance Film Festival, and won the Editing Award for the category World Cinema Documentary. In the same year it won an award for Best Adventure Film at the Boulder International Film Festival. In 2014 it was a three-time nominee at the Irish Film and Television Awards; it was nominated for Best Original Score, and it won both Best Documentary and Best Feature Documentary. The film one seven other awards in festivals around the world. In 2016 I Am Not A Serial Killer won the Nocturno Nuove Visioni Award at the Trieste Science+Fiction Festival, Best Feature film at the Strasbourg European Fantastic Film Festival, the Panorama Audience Award at Sitges-Catalonian International Film Festival, thae Audience Choice award at the Saskatoon Fantastic Film Festival, the Jury Prize at Molins Film Festival and received 3 nominations at the British Independent Film Awards (BIFA). The film won best editing at the 2017 Irish Film and Television Awards and the Festival Prize at the Bilbao Fantasy Film Festival.
