= Sandra Tayler =

American children's book, fantasy writer, & blogger (born 1973)

- Born: Sandra Owens; 1973 (age 52–53)
- Occupations: Editor, writer, publisher
- Spouse: Howard Tayler (1993–present)
- Relatives: Nancy Fulda (sister)
- Writing career
- Language: English
- Years active: 2008 - present
- Period: 2008–present
- Genres: Children's books, fantasy, science fiction
- Subject: Mental illness
- Website: onecobble.com

Sandra Tayler (born 1973) is an American short story and children's book writer and blogger. She edits, formats, and publishes her husband Howard Tayler's Schlock Mercenary comic compilations and related works. She has published science fiction and fantasy short stories, essays on parenting and mental illness, and has presented at conventions on writing and geek parenting.

Her blog, One Cobble at a Time, received an award in 2009 from the Association for Mormon Letters.

== Biography ==
Sandra Owens was born 1973. She married Howard Tayler in 1993 and they are the parents of four children. The writer Nancy Fulda is her sister.

== Career ==
Tayler began blogging to "rediscover who I was when I wasn't Mom." Her blog entries received the Association for Mormon Letters award for online writing in 2009. She published selections from her 2011 blog entries in a compilation entitled Cobble Stones: Year 2011.

Her fantasy short story, "Immigrant", was published in Ages of Wonder, an anthology from Daw Books edited by Julie E. Czerneda and Rob St. Martin. She edited the 2009 roleplaying game book, XDM: X-Treme Dungeon Mastery, written by Tracy and Curtis Hickman and illustrated by her husband, Howard.

Taylor wrote Hold on To Your Horses and The Strength of Wild Horses to help her daughter "visualize and control her impulsive ideas." Roger Sutton, editor-in-chief of The Horn Book, said Strength was "purposive but lightened with humor." Two of Tayler's essays have been featured on The Mighty, a website that spotlights experiences with mental health issues.

Tayler has presented at many conventions. She moderated a panel on geeky parenting at the 2014 Salt Lake Comic Con. She was a panelist at the 2016 Salt Lake ComiCon FanXperience about how to share and moderate media consumption. At the Gen Con Writer's Symposium in 2016, she presented on self-publishing, writing author bios, how to avoid writer's block, and how to support a creative lifestyle. In a presentation at Life, the Universe, & Everything in 2013, she recommended setting aside a physical space for creative work and working in small bits of time as they become available.

=== Schlock Mercenary ===
Tayler directs the publication of her husband Howard Tayler's Schlock Mercenary comic compilations, completing editing, layout, and design.

She was the primary editor and a contributor to Planet Mercenary, a tabletop RPG set in the Schlock Mercenary universe. She completed the formatting and design for Seventy Maxims of Maximally Effective Mercenaries, which was available in two editions to Kickstarter backers: a "defaced" version with comments written by characters and a "pristine" version without handwritten comments. Tayler formatted the notes in the "defaced" edition using handwritten notes.

== Works ==
=== Books ===
- Hold on to Your Horses (2008, The Tayler Corporation)
- Cobble Stones (2012, Hypernode Press)
- The Strength of Wild Horses (2014, Hypernode Press)

=== Short fiction works ===
- "Immigrant" in Ages of Wonder edited by Julie E. Czerneda and Rob St. Martin (2009, Daw Books, ISBN 978-0-7564-0543-4)
- "Bethan's Garden" in The Mind of the Beholder (2012, AnthologyBuilder, ISBN 9781475296204)
- "The Road Not Taken" in 2012 Mormon Lit Blitz (2012, online only)

=== Roleplaying games ===
- XDM: X-Treme Dungeon Mastery, editor (2009, The Tayler Corporation, ISBN 9780977907465)
- Planet Mercenary, editor (2017)

=== Essays ===
- "The Non-Fictional Sense of Wonder" in Locus Roundtable (2011, online only)
- "Married to Depression" in Altered Perceptions edited by Brandon Sanderson, Dan Wells, and Robison Wells (2014, Fearful Symmetry)
- "When Mental Illness Is in Disguise" on The Mighty.com (2016, online only)
- "When You're the Wife of a Man With Depression" on The Mighty.com (2016, online only)

== Awards and recognition ==
Year	Organization	Award title, Category	Work	Result	Refs
2009	Association for Mormon Letters	Award for Online Writing	One Cobble at a Time website	Won	
