= Nothing Left to Lose (novel) =

2017 horror novel by Dan Wells

- Author: Dan Wells
- Cover artist: Peter Lutjen
- Language: English
- Series: John Cleaver Second Trilogy
- Genre: Horror
- Published: 2017, Tor Books
- Publication place: United States
- Media type: Print book (hardcover and paperback) e-book audiobook
- Pages: 335
- ISBN: 9780765380708
- OCLC: 957739362
- Preceded by: Over Your Dead Body

Nothing Left to Lose is a 2017 horror novel by Dan Wells published by Tor Books. It is the sixth and final John Wayne Cleaver series installment, following Over Your Dead Body (2016). The novel concludes the story of sociopathic teenage protagonist John Cleaver and his hunt for an ancient network of demons who call themselves "the Withered". After bringing his best friend, Brooke, back to her home and family, John travels to Arizona to find Rain, the Queen of the Withered. In what appears to be a simple, small town, John has to face multiple demons, all while trying to hide from the FBI. Critical reception of Nothing Left to Lose was mostly positive, and the book was nominated for an AML Award and a Dragon Award. It has been published in English, Spanish, and German. The audiobook version is narrated by Kirby Heyborne.

== Development ==
Like the earlier books in the series, Nothing Left to Lose required research on Wells's part of embalming and other aspects of a mortuary. He also drew upon his experiences traveling to Germany to write about John's travels in the second trilogy of the series. Wells wanted to write the novel in such a way that new readers not familiar with John or his past would be able to understand the events that occur in this sixth book. In an episode of the Writing Excuses podcast, he asserted that Nothing Left to Lose would be the last book in the John Cleaver series. He has, however, mentioned the possibility of releasing short stories "about some of [John's] travels the books only hint at."

== Plot summary ==
John Wayne Cleaver is again flying solo on his vendetta against the supernatural killers called "the Withered". He follows a lead to the town of Lewisville, Arizona, in search of a demon named "Rain." His first stop is the funeral of a woman he suspects might be a victim of a Withered. There, he is approached by an odd, homeless-looking woman who tells him to "Run from Rain". He lands a job as the local mortuary's make-up artist and makes friends with his boss, Margo, and fellow employee, Jasmyn. When townspeople begin to die under strange circumstances, John's gig allows him to examine the bodies of the victims: a woman who drowned nowhere near water, and a boy who was burned alive nowhere near fire. Then, while walking by the local canal, John is almost drowned by a man who claims "The Dark Lady" was sent to kill him. He is rescued by a few men, one of whom is a demon named Assu, who has the power to burn things. He craves cold, so John takes him back to the mortuary's freezer. There, a fire ignites, and Assu is disintegrated into demonic black sludge. John tries to clean it all up, worried that the FBI will track him down if it is discovered. With this in mind, he takes extra precautions, including arming the mortuary doors with motion detectors and finding a new place to stay.

The mortuary receives the body of the burned boy, and John finds two confounding handprints on his arms that were left unscathed. Further contributing to his confusion, another drowned body is found at a junkyard out in the desert, with strange splash marks nearby. Then, FBI Agent Mills shows up in Lewisville. Immediately, he inspects the mortuary and finds some of the black sludge left behind from the fire. Knowing that Mills will trace this evidence back to him, John runs out of town along the highway, but before he can escape, the same homeless-looking woman from the funeral attacks him. She flees when a car shows up, and John climbs inside before he realizes the driver is Mills. Exhausted from being attacked, John gives in and resigns himself to being in the custody of the FBI. Once they arrive at Mills' motel, they find the dead body of a fellow agent displayed in the room. Then, Mills – whose actual name is Sam Harris – is taken over by the Dark Lady. He attacks the only remaining FBI agent in Lewisville, but John manages to knock him out with a shower rod before any more damage can be done. Then, he immediately goes to tell his friends at the mortuary of the impending danger, but upon arrival, learns that Margo is the Dark Lady. Thousands of years ago, she gave up her unborn child to become a "goddess", and ever since, she has used her powers to take care of young wayward souls, trying to make up for her loss. The Dark Lady tells John that only three Withered are left, and she is trying to create more to keep their legacy intact. John thinks about something Jasmyn once said – that everyone is worth saving – and tries to help the Withered by telling them the rules he put in place for himself to control his dangerous impulses. Realizing just how much he has changed himself, he exhorts them to follow a similar path and curb their lust for blood.

The FBI comes, and a terrible array of violence breaks out. The homeless woman shows up and uses her powers to drown multiple agents, as well as another Withered that attacks John. Margo reveals that she turned this woman, Dana, into a demon sixty years ago as part of her plan to create more monsters. Because of her misery and desire to end the cycle of killing, Dana then drowns herself. Once Margo is the only Withered left, John convinces Agent Harris to let him stay with her to keep her in check; this way, a government execution will not be in her future. Five months later, John remains in Lewisville with Margo, helping her contain her darker side and continuing to improve himself. One day, Harris shows up with Margaret and Lauren, John's aunt and sister, respectively. John's story ends with him befriending the demon queen and a tearful, joyful reunion with the only family he has left.

== Reception ==
Rick Feldschau reviewed the book for Deseret News, writing that the conclusion "felt a bit far-fetched and saccharine," but concluded that "Dan Wells' latest comes in as one of the greats in the Cleaver series, paralleled only by book five's emotional depth and book one's intro to readers' favorite sociopath." Alternative Magazine Online reviewer Marty Mulrooney wrote that "Nothing Left to Lose takes all the atypical ingredients that have made the series so devilishly enjoyable and mixes them together in an exciting new way," and stated that while the ending "stretches believability", it was "worth it". Elitist Book Reviews also rated Nothing Left as a worthy conclusion for the series, recommending the novel's "twisty villains, twistier plots, and ... main character with (a knife and) all the heart in the world" to readers. At the Barnes and Noble Science Fiction and Fantasy blog, Adam Rowe wrote that he thought the story was "streamlined" and "gripping", "filled with the horrifying, murderous fun his fans rely on."

== Awards and nominations ==
- 2017 AML Award nominee for Best Novel
- 2017 Dragon Award nominee for Best Horror Novel
