= Extreme Makeover (novel) =

2016 satirical medical science fiction thriller novel by Dan Wells

- US version of the cover
- Author: Dan Wells
- Language: English
- Genre: Satire; Science fiction; Thriller
- Publisher: Tor (US)
- Publication date: 2016 (US)
- Publication place: United States
- Media type: Hardcover; Paperback; Digital; Audio
- Pages: 416
- ISBN: 978-0-7653-8563-5

Extreme Makeover is a 2016 satirical medical science fiction thriller novel by Dan Wells. It follows Lyle Fontanelle, a scientist at a cosmetics company, as he deals with the repercussions of creating an anti-wrinkle cream that clones people.

It was a finalist at the 2016 Whitney Awards for best speculative fiction novel.

== Plot summary ==
Lyle Fontanelle is the chief scientist at NewYew, a multi-national cosmetics company based in New York City. While working to create a better anti-wrinkle cream, he accidentally creates a lotion that clones people. The remainder of the novel follows Lyle and others as they deal with the fallout from a product they can no longer control.

== Release ==
Extreme Makeover was released in hardcover, trade paperback, and ebook by Tor Books on November 15, 2016. Macmillan Audio released an audiobook on the same day.

Hardcover

Tor Books (November 2016, ISBN 978-0-7653-8562-8, 416 pages)

Trade paperback

Tor Books (November 2016, ISBN 978-0-7653-8563-5, 416 pages)

Ebook

Tor Books (November 2016, ISBN 978-0-7653-8564-2)

Audiobook

Macmillan Audio (November 2016, ISBN 978-1-4272-8793-9, narrated by Brian Troxell)

== Reception and recognition ==
Publishers Weekly called the book "enjoyable satire" that "reads more like a humorous thriller than a diatribe", stating that it "should find favor with speculative and mainstream readers alike". Megan M. McArdle of Library Journal called it an "entertaining send-up of corporate greed and societal shallowness". Madelynn Conrad, writing in the Deseret News, said it was "riddled with Wells’ trademark humor" and "gracefully tied together with phenomenal writing, comprehensive world building and beautifully executed plot development".

=== Awards ===
Year	Organization	Award title, Category	Result	Refs
2016	Storymakers Author Guild	Whitney Awards, Best Speculative Fiction	Finalist	
