= Piper J. Drake =

American novelist (1976–2026)

- Born: September 15, 1976; Syracuse, New York, U.S.
- Died: May 18, 2026 (aged 49); Stony Brook, New York, U.S.
- Education: Trenton State College (BS); Temple University (MS)
- Occupations: Author, podcast personality
- Website: piperjdrake.com

Lalana Dararutana (September 15, 1976 – May 18, 2026), better known by her pseudonym Piper J. Drake, was an American author and podcast personality. She also authored as PJ Schnyder.

== Early life and education ==
Drake was born on September 15, 1976. She studied at Trenton State College and graduated with a Bachelor of Science in biology. She began a career in life sciences and graduated from Temple University with a Master of Science in Quality Assurance/Regulatory Affairs.

== Career ==
Piper J. Drake (or "PJ") began her writing career in 2010 as "PJ Schnyder" writing award-winning science fiction & paranormal romance and steampunk.

Her first podcast credit came from narrating her own short story written as PJ Schnyder, A Swan in Siam, for Tales from the Archives Vol. 2 set in the world of The Ministry of Peculiar Occurrences created by Tee Morris and Philippa Ballantine. She has provided her voice to episodes of The Voice of Free Planet X by Jared Axelrod. She appeared as a guest on The Shared Desk by Tee Morris and Philippa Ballantine occasionally and was co-host of MangoRicePod with her partner, Matthew J. Drake.

In 2015, she began writing romantic suspense as Piper J. Drake. She debuted in the genre with the Safeguard series, published by Carina Press. Her True Heroes series, published by Hachette Book Group's Grand Central Publishing's Forever imprint, launched in 2016.

In 2017, Drake joined the cast of Writing Excuses as a host for season 12. She also launched 20 Minute Delay, a podcast on travel co-hosted with Gail Carriger.

Recognized by the Romance Writers of America in 2018 as a Romance Trailblazer, having written the first Own Voices Thai (Southeast Asian) romance.

Surprise guest with TypecastRPG on Twitch in July 2020, she joined the cast in 2021.

== Death ==
Drake died on May 18, 2026, at the age of 49.

== Publications ==
=== Novels ===
- Heart's Sentinel written as PJ Schnyder, Carina Press, 2010, ISBN 1936394421
- Fighting Kat written as PJ Schnyder, Carina Press, 2014, ASIN: B00F942UCI
- Hidden Impact, Carina Press, 2015, ISBN 978-1335932297
- Extreme Honor, Forever – Hachette Book Group, 2016, ISBN 978-1455536047
- Deadly Testimony, Carina Press, 2016, ISBN 978-1335013118
- Ultimate Courage, Forever – Hachette Book Group, 2016, ISBN 978-1455536054
- Absolute Trust, Forever – Hachette Book Group, 2016, ISBN 978-1455536085
- Contracted Defense, Carina Press, 2017, ISBN 978-1335895677
- Total Bravery, Hachette Book Group, 2018, ISBN 978-1538759530
- Fierce Justice, Hachette Book Group, 2019, ISBN 978-1538759578
- Forever Strong, Hachette Book Group, 2020, ISBN 978-1538759608
- Wings Once Cursed & Bound, Sourcebooks Casablanca, 2023, ISBN 978-1492683865

=== Novellas ===
- Red's Wolf written as PJ Schnyder, Decadent Publishing, 2010, ISBN 978-1-936394-18-0
- Evie's Gift written as PJ Schnyder, Decadent Publishing, 2010, ISBN 978-1-936394-51-7
- Hunting Kat written as PJ Schnyder, Carina Press, 2011, ASIN: B005078OME
- Bite Me written as PJ Schnyder, Carina Press, 2011, ASIN: B005078OME
- Sing for the Dead written as PJ Schnyder, Carina Press, 2011, ASIN: B005078OME
- Survive to Dawn written as PJ Schnyder, Carina Press, 2011, ASIN: B005078OME
- Siren's Calling (The Sea King's Daughters Book 4), 2018, ASIN: B07FWSWV5T
- Gaming Grace (Gone Wild Book 2), 2020, ASIN: B081155LZ1

=== Short stories ===
- A Swan in Siam written as PJ Schnyder, Tales from the Archives, 2013
- Winter Valor, True Heroes short story in 2016
- A Calamity of Crows written as PJ Schnyder, Tales from the Archives, releasing in 2017

== Awards and recognition ==
- 2014 Prism Award from Futuristic, Fantasy and Paranormal Chapter of the RWA for Sing for the Dead written as PJ Schnyder
- 2013 Golden Leaf Award from New Jersey Romance Writers for Bite Me written as PJ Schnyder
- 2013 Parsec Award winner for Best Speculative Fiction: Small Cast (Short Form)
