= I Don't Want to Kill You =

2011 horror novel by Dan Wells

- Cover art for I Don't Want to Kill You
- Author: Dan Wells
- Cover artist: Peter Lutjen
- Language: English
- Series: John Cleaver Trilogy
- Genre: Horror
- Published: 2011, Tor Books (US) Headline (UK)
- Publication place: United States
- Media type: Print book (hardcover) and (paperback) e-book audiobook
- Pages: 334
- Award: 2011 Whitney Award for Best Novel of the Year
- ISBN: 9780765362384
- OCLC: 859308182
- Preceded by: Mr. Monster
- Followed by: The Devil's Only Friend

I Don't Want to Kill You is a 2011 horror novel by Dan Wells published by Tor Books in the U.S. and Headline Publishing Group in the U.K. It is the third book in the John Wayne Cleaver series, following I Am Not a Serial Killer and Mr. Monster. It continues the story of the sixteen-year-old sociopath who has now killed two demons and summoned another to his small town; in this novel, John encounters new threats, a new relationship, and heartbreak as he works to protect his friends and family from these supernatural beings. Critical reception of I Don't Want to Kill You was mostly positive, and the book was awarded the 2011 Whitney Award for Best Novel of the Year. It has been published in English, Spanish, French, Croatian, and German. Kirby Heyborne narrates the audiobook version.

== Development ==
The novel's working title prior to its release was "Full of Holes." It was originally intended to be the last book in the John Cleaver series. Wells has said that following up I Am Not a Serial Killer improved his abilities as a writer, particularly because of the work involved in deepening the character of John Cleaver. Wells strove to make the protagonist a sympathetic sociopath. As a whole, the first trilogy is "about John learning how to feel," according to Wells. Like Serial Killer and Mr. Monster, the novel required researching serial killers, embalming, and offender profiling.

== Plot summary ==
After encountering and killing two demons, sociopathic teenager John Wayne Cleaver has decided that if anyone in Clayton County, North Dakota is ever going to be completely safe, he has to be the slayer of these supernatural serial killers. The first one strikes by shooting a priest, cutting off his hands and tongue, and displaying the body outside. This is the signature of "the Handyman," a known serial killer from Georgia. John surmises that he or she is a demon, nicknamed "Nobody," and that they've come to Clayton to find him. Meanwhile, John goes on a date with Marci Jensen who, to his surprise, is very interested in him. A news report the next morning reveals Clayton's mayor as the next victim. John knows he is the only one who can stop Nobody, but his mom pleads with him to stay out of it.

On the first day of school, John learns that one of his classmates took her own life by slitting her wrists - the same exact way another girl had killed herself a few months prior. He and Marci skip class, and John opens up to her and teaches her how criminal profiling works. She proves to be very good at it, but the two are unable to identify the next victim before it is slain. The body of a teacher is found with the eyeballs removed. After Father Erikson, a priest at the local Catholic church, shares Matthew 5:29 and Matthew 5:30 with John, he realizes that the demon's pattern is killing sinners in authority positions. But before John can act, the culprit kills the sheriff.

While John and Marci are at the homecoming dance, the killer sends him a message - delivered by a student dressed in a fake bomb - in which he or she vows to "purify" the town "by fire." This encounter contradicts the profile John and Marci made for the killer. After spending plenty of time together, the two grow closer, with John feeling surprised that she still wants to be his friend after learning about his sociopathy. The next morning, John's neighbor Brooke comes over and tells him that Marci's best friend has died by suicide. She, too, slit her wrists, which leads John to suspect that the three girls were actually murdered by a second demon. He sets a trap for the Handyman, who he now has realized is separate from Nobody, and is successful. While he was expecting to find a demon, he finds a demon killer; John sees his future self in this man, but instead of killing him, calls the police. The Handyman shoots himself.

The next morning, Marci is found dead, the same way the other three girls were killed. The demon, Nobody, had been moving body to body, girl to girl. Her next victim is Brooke. John tries to kill her, but Nobody tries to possess him. Suddenly, John's mom intervenes, convincing the demon to possess her instead and sacrificing herself in order to save her son. After Brooke and John wake up in the hospital, an FBI agent reveals she knows about the demons, and his mother's death proves to John that he has a heart.

== Reception ==
Reviews of I Don't Want to Kill You mainly praised Wells's capability as an author and John Cleaver's effective characterization. Kirkus Reviews wrote: "John continues to evolve as a character, and the tantalizing conclusion hints at a new beginning." Voice of Youth Advocates cited John's sociopathy as clear and convincing, saying that "most of the ugly details are neutralized by Cleaver's cold and technical approach, which leaves the novel approachable for those who do not seek horror but enjoy a good detective story." Publishers Weekly echoed approval of the protagonist and added, "Wells lards his fanciful narrative with enough mortuary science to ground it in the cold realities of forensic pathology and give it a grisly edge." David Pitt for Booklist recommended I Don't Want to Kill You to "horror and fantasy fans of all ages," likening the series to Jeff Lindsay's Dexter novels.

Lee Mandelo applauded Wells's writing but felt the ending was forced and predictable. A Fantasy Book Review writer agreed that the final reveal was unsurprising, but still dubbed the novel "a great conclusion to a brilliant debut series." Emily W. Jensen for Deseret News complimented I Don't Want to Kill You's juxtaposition of horror with uplifting story elements, saying, "Wells deftly entwines lessons on strengthening relationships, standing for what’s right, and even sacrificing for love, all while taking the reader on a roller-coaster ride of a story that surprises, scares and above all, satisfies."

== Awards and nominations ==
- 2011 Whitney Award for Best Novel of the Year
- 2011 Whitney Award finalist for Best Speculative Fiction

== See also ==
- Dan Wells
- I Am Not a Serial Killer
- I Am Not a Serial Killer (film)
- Mr. Monster
