= Movement (short story) =

Short story by Nancy Fulda

"Movement" is a 2011 science fiction short story by Nancy Fulda. It was first published in Asimov's Science Fiction.

== Synopsis ==
Hannah is a teenage girl with "temporal autism", who is offered a potential cure.

== Reception ==
"Movement" was a finalist for the 2011 Nebula Award for Best Short Story and the 2012 Hugo Award for Best Short Story.
