= Ruairí Robinson =

Irish film director and writer (born 1978)

- Born: 15 February 1978 (age 48); Dublin, Ireland
- Occupation: Film director
- Website: www.ruairirobinson.com

Ruairí Robinson is an Irish film director and writer.

== Biography ==
He is known mainly for his science-fiction short films and animations, one of which, Fifty Percent Grey, was nominated for an Academy Award. Fifty Percent Grey was also included in the Animation Show of Shows. The Silent City concerns a group of soldiers wandering through a perilous post-apocalyptic wasteland; the cast includes actor Cillian Murphy. His short film BlinkyTM was released on 20 March 2011, and concerns a robot helper that turns murderous.

He signed on to direct a live action adaptation of Akira, but the project was cancelled after Robinson departed. In 2013, Robinson directed The Last Days on Mars, the adaptation of the science-fiction short story "The Animators" by Sydney J. Bounds. In early 2015 he directed the proof of concept short film The Leviathan, which became a viral hit, spawning talk of a full-length version.

== Filmography ==
=== As actor ===
- BlinkyTM as Blinky (voice) (2011, short)

=== As director ===
- The House on Dame Street (1999, short, also producer and writer)
- Fifty Percent Grey (2001, short, also writer)
- The Silent City (2006, short, also producer and writer)
- BlinkyTM (2011, short, also writer)
- The Last Days on Mars (2013)
- The Leviathan (2015, concept teaser, written by Jim Uhls)
- Corporate Monster (2019, short, also writer) - filmed circa 2010–2011 as Imaginary Forces

=== As producer ===
- Uncle Bill's Barrel (2008, short, executive producer)

=== As writer ===
- The German (2008, short also executive producer)
