= Writing Excuses =

Literary podcast

- The cover art for the Writing Excuses podcast
- Genre: Writing; Science fiction; Fantasy; Horror

Cast and voices
- Hosted by: Mary Robinette Kowal; Dan Wells; Brandon Sanderson; Howard Tayler

Publication
- Original release: 02/10/2008
- Updates: active

Related
- Website: writingexcuses.com

Writing Excuses is a podcast hosted by authors Dan Wells, Mary Robinette Kowal, Erin Roberts, DongWon Song, and author and web cartoonist Howard Tayler, and formerly also hosted by author Brandon Sanderson.

Promoted as "fifteen minutes long, because you're in a hurry, and we're not that smart", the hosts and guests discuss different topics involved in the creation and production of genre writing and webcomics.

== Premise ==
''Writing Excuses'' website in December 2019.

The show aims to cover a single writing-related topic in each podcast, in a format short enough to be listened to on a morning commute or during a lunch break. Though it is promoted as "fifteen minutes long, because you're in a hurry, and we're not that smart," Writing Excuses frequently runs to about 20 minutes.

The single topic is discussed in a back-and-forth by the hosts. Given the authors' backgrounds in fantasy and science fiction there is a strong emphasis in those genres, but Writing Excuses covers a wide variety of topics intended to apply to fiction and creative arts generally. The hosts also introduce a book of the week, either a favorite of the hosts or one of their own works. The hosts often also invite guest authors and industry professionals on board for podcast episodes (often at conventions).

As of 2026, the podcast is on its twenty-first season.

== Hosts ==
Writing Excuses began in 2008 with three hosts – Dan Wells, Brandon Sanderson, and Howard Tayler. After making a number of guest appearances, Mary Robinette Kowal joined the permanent cast as a new host at the beginning of season 6 in 2011. At the end of 2022, Erin Roberts and DongWon Song became hosts, replacing Sanderson, who became a "host emeritus."

Starting in season 12, the podcast has also included guest hosts, including Wesley Chu, Piper J. Drake, Mary Anne Mohanraj, C.L. Polk, Maurice Broaddus, Amal El-Mohtar, Zoraida Cordova, V.E. Schwab, and others.

== Awards ==
The Writing Excuses podcast has received the following recognition:

Year	Organization	Award title, Category	Work	Result	Refs
2009	FarPoint Media	Parsec Award, Best Writing Related Podcast	-	Won	
2010	FarPoint Media	Parsec Award, Best Podcast about Speculative Fiction Content Creation	-	Won	
2010	Podcast Connect	Podcast Award	-	Nominated	
2011	World Science Fiction Society	Hugo Award, Best Related Work	Writing Excuses Season 4	Nominated	
2012	World Science Fiction Society	Hugo Award, Best Related Work	Writing Excuses Season 6	Nominated	
2013	World Science Fiction Society	Hugo Award, Best Related Work	Writing Excuses Season 7	Won	
2014	World Science Fiction Society	Hugo Award, Best Related Work	Writing Excuses Season 8	Nominated	

== Shadows Beneath anthology ==
Shadows Beneath
- Editor: Peter Ahlstrom
- Author: Mary Robinette Kowal; Brandon Sanderson; Eric James Stone; Howard Tayler; Dan Wells
- Illustrator: Kekai Kotaki; Kathryn Layno; Ben McSweeney; Rhiannon Rasmussen-Silverstein; Howard Tayler
- Cover artist: Julie Dillon
- Language: English
- Genre: Science fiction, fantasy, horror
- Publisher: Dragonsteel Entertainment
- Publication date: July 2014
- Publication place: United States
- Media type: Print, digital
- Pages: 366
- ISBN: 978-1-938570-03-2 (hardcover)
- OCLC: 884923884
- LC Class: PS648.F3 S494 2014

Shadows Beneath, an anthology of four stories written by the members of Writing Excuses, was published in 2014. The anthology's bonus material is intended to show some of the processes of story creation. The stories were brainstormed on the podcast and the first drafts later critiqued. Transcripts of the podcasts and one or more drafts of the stories are included. The stories are illustrated by Kekai Kotaki, Kathryn Layno, Ben McSweeney, Rhiannon Rasmussen-Silverstein, and Tayler.

The anthology was released as a hardcover and an ebook in July 2014 through Dragonsteel Entertainment. The stories include:

- A Fire in the Heavens, by Mary Robinette Kowal
- I.E. Demon, by Dan Wells
- An Honest Death, by Howard Tayler
- Sixth of the Dusk, by Brandon Sanderson

=== Reception ===
Eric Seal of Nitwitty Magazine stated that "no other book on writing...offers a wealth of writing knowledge in such a consumable form." GraphicAudio described it as "an exhaustive look at the entire process [of writing]". MySF Reviews described the behind-the-scenes part of the book as "the most interesting thing about this collection". The anthology was a preliminary nominee for the Hugo Award for Best Related Work in 2015, but did not make the final ballot.

Writing Excuses was sponsored by Audible from October 2009 through July 2016, after which it became listener-supported.
