= Partials Sequence =

Young adult fiction book series

The Partials Sequence is a book series by Dan Wells that was published by the HarperCollins imprint Balzer & Bray. The series is composed of a trilogy in addition to a novella prequel. The story is set in a dystopic New York and follows the protagonist Kira Walker.

== Books ==
=== Isolation ===
Isolation is the prequel to the Partials Sequence.

=== Partials ===
Partials was published on February 28, 2012 by the HarperCollins imprint Balzer & Bray. Common Sense Media gave Partials a five star rating and recommended the book for readers age fourteen and up. The Los Angeles Times noted that although the book is young adult fiction, older readers may enjoy the book as well. The protagonist of the story is Kira Walker. The story is set in a dystopian world where the only living human beings left are in Long Island, New York. In the story, "Partials" are humans that were engineered to be weapons. In Slate, Chelsey Philpot compared the book to Megan McCafferty's book Thumped and Anna Carey's Eve. The book is 480 pages long.

=== Fragments ===
Fragments was published on February 26, 2013 by the HarperCollins imprint Balzer & Bray. Common Sense Media gave Fragments a five star rating and recommended the book for readers age fourteen and up. Fragments follows Kira as she searches for the remains of a company called ParaGen. Kira allies herself with two Partials during her journey through the wasteland.

=== Ruins ===
Ruins was published on March 11, 2014 by the HarperCollins imprint Balzer & Bray. Common Sense Media gave Ruins a five star rating and recommended the book for readers age fourteen and up. The book is 464 pages long. Ruins was a finalist in the Young Adult Speculative Novel category of the 2014 AML Awards.
