= Nancy Fulda =

American science fiction writer

- Born: Nancy Owens
- Education: Brigham Young University; BS & MS (Computer science)
- Occupations: Writer; scientist; instructor
- Relatives: Sandra Tayler (sister); Howard Tayler (brother-in-law)
- Writing career
- Language: English
- Period: 2004–present
- Genres: Science fiction, fantasy
- Subjects: Artificial intelligence, machine learning
- Notable works: "Movement"; "The Man Who Murdered Himself"; "Godshift"
- Notable awards: AML; BSFA; Asimov's Reader's Choice; Hugo (nominee); Nebula (nominee)

Nancy Fulda (née Owens) is an American science fiction writer, editor, and computer scientist. She is an alumna of Brigham Young University in the fields of artificial intelligence and machine learning. She has won multiple awards for her science fiction writing, which has been compared to that of Asimov and Clarke.

== Biography ==
Fulda graduated in 2002 with a bachelor's degree in computer science at Brigham Young University. In 2004, she received a master's degree in the same field, focusing on artificial intelligence and machine learning.

One of her favorite science fiction short stories is Flowers for Algernon, by Daniel Keyes, and she calls it "one of the best science fiction books [she] ever read". Her first award for writing was the 1998 Vera Hinckley Mayhew Award—given out at Brigham Young University—for her short story "The Man Who Murdered Himself". This story was later formally published in 2004 for the first time in The Phobos Science Fiction Anthology Volume 3. Having this story published helped her move toward a career in writing.

Her story "That Undiscovered Country" won the Jim Baen Memorial Short Story Award Grand Prize in 2011, beating "Gemini XVII" by Brad R. Torgersen and "Natural Selection" by Michael Simon. Fulda's 2012 story, "Movement" was partially inspired by her autistic son. It won the Readers' Choice Award from Asimov's Science Fiction, and was nominated for the BSFA, Hugo, and Nebula Awards.

Her writing has been compared to that of Isaac Asimov and Arthur C. Clarke. She draws on her religion, life experiences, and science background when creating her stories. Because of various conversations with fellow writers, she called for tolerance and respect in the science fiction and fantasy writing field for those with religious beliefs. Fulda is active in SFWA and has addressed various topics on the SFWA site as a guest blogger: engaging in online discussions, dealing with awards season, how to create good antagonists, developing effective hooks, writing short and long stories, and carving a finished story from an unfinished idea.

Fulda created the Anthology Builder website in 2007 as a way to promote short stories through custom anthologies, though the site closed down in late 2016. She is an assistant professor in the Computer Science department at Brigham Young University, and she has four children.

== Relatives ==
Fulda's sister is writer Sandra Tayler; her brother-in-law is cartoonist Howard Tayler.

== Bibliography ==
Works are listed in chronological order within each section.

=== Collections ===
- Dead Men Don't Cry: Science Fiction by Nancy Fulda (February 2011, self-published, ISBN 978-1-4609-5362-4)
  - Dead Men Don't Cry: 11 Stories by Nancy Fulda (February 2011, self-published, same content as above with the addition of "Tammi's Garden")
- Hexes and Haunts: A Halloween 5-Pack (October 2011, self-published)
- The Breath of Heaven: Stories from Distant Worlds (May 2012, AnthologyBuilder, ISBN 978-1-4662-7990-2)
- The Death and Rebirth of Anne Bonny (December 2015, self-published, ISBN 978-1-5196-3934-9)
  - Contains: "The Death and Rebirth of Anne Bonny", "Saving Sammy", "All or Nothing", "In the Fading Light of Sundown", "The Cyborg and the Cemetery", and "First Steps"

=== Series ===
- The Numbers Quartet
  - "All or Nothing" (2012)
  - "The Death and Rebirth of Anne Bonny" (2012)
  - "Godshift" (2012)

=== Short fiction ===
- "Tammi's Garden" in TeenAge (date unknown)
- "The Man Who Murdered Himself" (1998), first collected in All the Rage This Year edited by Keith Olexa (September 2004, Phobos Books, ISBN 0-9720026-5-0)
- "Ghost Chimes" in Apex Science Fiction and Horror Digest, #4 edited by Jason Sizemore (December 2005, Apex Publications)
- "All Praise to the Dreamer" in Aegri Somnia edited by Jason Sizemore and Gill Ainsworth (December 2006, Apex Publications, ISBN 0-9788676-2-9)
- "Pastry Run" in Jim Baen's Universe, Volume 1, #4 edited by Eric Flint (December 2006, Baen Books)
- "Blue Ink" in AlienSkin Magazine (2006)
- "The Breath of Heaven" in The Sword Review, Issue 27 (June 2007, Double-Edged Publishing)
- "Monument" in Apex Science Fiction and Horror Digest, #10 edited by Jason Sizemore (October 2007, Apex Publications)
- "Dead Men Don't Cry" in The Sword Review (2007, Double-Edged Publishing)
- "A New Kind of Sunrise" in Warrior Wisewoman edited by Roby James (June 2008, Norilana Books, ISBN 978-1-934169-89-6)
- "In the Halls of the Sky Palace" in Jim Baen's Universe, June 2009 (Baen Books)
- "Hexes and Tooth Decay" in Darwin's Evolutions (October 2009)
- "Backlash" in Asimov's Science Fiction Magazine, September 2010 (Dell Magazines)
- "Knowing Neither Kin Nor Foe" in Beneath Ceaseless Skies, #40 (April 2010)
- "The Scream" in NewMyths.com, Issue 13 (December 2010)
- "Like Rain From Silver Skies" in Basement Stories, Issue #3 (January 2011)
- "Movement" in Asimov's Science Fiction Magazine, March 2011 (Dell Magazines)
- "The Half-Life of Chocolate" (April 2011, Fae Publishing)
- "That Undiscovered Country" (2011, Baen.com)
- "All or Nothing" (January 2012, Daily Science Fiction)
- "The Death and Rebirth of Anne Bonny" (January 2012, Daily Science Fiction)
- "Godshift" (March 2012, Daily Science Fiction)
- "In The Fading Light of Sundown" in Orson Scott Card's InterGalactic Medicine Show, #27 edited by Edmund R. Schubert (March 2012, Hatrack River)
- "A Song of Blackness" in Beneath Ceaseless Skies, #106 edited by Scott H. Andrews (October 2012)
- "A Starscape Slightly Askew" (2012)
- "Dawn, and the Stars" (May 2013, Deorc Enterprise)
- "The Cyborg and the Cemetery" in Twelve Tomorrows edited by Stephen Cass (September 2013, MIT Technology Review)
- "A Soaring Pillar of Brightness" in Beyond the Sun edited by Bryan Thomas Schmidt (August 2013, Fairwood Press, ISBN 978-1-933846-38-5)
- Castles in the Sky" in Dark Expanse: Surviving the Collapse edited by Alex Shvartsman and William Snee (March 2014, Deorc Enterprise)
- "Ghost Ship" in Dark Expanse: Surviving the Collapse edited by Alex Shvartsman and William Snee (March 2014, Deorc Enterprise)
- "The Shadow Conspiracy" in Dark Expanse: Surviving the Collapse edited by Alex Shvartsman and William Snee (March 2014, Deorc Enterprise)
- "Deadfall" in Shattered Shields edited by Jennifer Brozek and Bryan Thomas Schmidt (November 2014, Baen Books, ISBN 978-1-4767-3701-0)
- "Recollection" in Carbide Tipped Pens edited by Eric Choi and Ben Bova (December 2014, Tor Books, ISBN 978-0-7653-3430-5)
- "Metamorphosis" (July 2015, SF Comet)
- "Saving Sammy" (December 2015, in The Death and Rebirth of Anne Bonny)
- "Angles of Incidence" in Analog Science Fiction and Fact, October 2016 (Dell Magazines)
- "Nexus" (2016, in Humanity 2.0 edited by Alex Shvartsman, Phoenix Pick, ISBN 978-1-61242-309-8)
- "Planetbound" (2017, in Chasing Shadows: Visions of Our Coming Transparent World edited by Stephen W. Potts, Tor Books, ISBN 978-0-7653-8258-0)

=== Nonfiction and academic ===
- Peterson, Todd S.; Carroll, James L.; Owens, Nancy E. (February 2001). "Memory-guided exploration in reinforcement learning". IJCNN'01. International Joint Conference on Neural Networks. Proceedings (Cat. No.01CH37222). Vol. 2. Washington, D.C.: International Joint Conference on Neural Networks. pp. 1002–1007. doi:10.1109/IJCNN.2001.939497. ISBN 0-7803-7044-9. S2CID 8477395.
- Peterson, Todd S.; Owens, Nancy E.; Carroll, James L. (May 2001). "Towards automatic shaping in robot navigation". Proceedings 2001 ICRA. IEEE International Conference on Robotics and Automation (Cat. No.01CH37164). Vol. 1. Seoul, South Korea: IEEE International Conference on Robotics and Automation. pp. 517–522. doi:10.1109/ROBOT.2001.932602. ISBN 0-7803-6576-3. S2CID 8531327.
- Peterson, Todd; Owens, Nancy (October 2001). "Using a reinforcement learning controller to overcome simulator/environment discrepancies" (PDF). Proceedings of the IEEE Conference on Systems, Man, and Cybernetics. Tucson, Arizona: 1424–1429.
- Fulda, Nancy; Ventura, Dan (May 2003). "Concurrently Learning Neural Nets: Encouraging Optimal Behavior in Cooperative Reinforcement Learning Systems" (PDF). Proceedings of the IEEE International Workshop on Soft Computing Techniques in Instrumentation, Measurement, and Related Applications. Provo, Utah: IEEE International Workshop on Soft Computing Techniques in Instrumentation, Measurement, and Related Applications: 2–5.
- Fulda, Nancy; Ventura, Dan (June 2003). "Dynamic Joint Action Perception for Q-Learning Agents" (PDF). Proceedings of the International Conference on Machine Learning and Applications. Los Angeles, California: International Conference on Machine Learning and Applications: 73–78.
- Fulda, Nancy; Ventura, Dan (September 2003). "Target Sets: A Tool for Understanding and Predicting the Behavior of Interacting Q-learners" (PDF). Proceedings of the International Joint Conference on Information Sciences. Cary, North Carolina: IEEE International Joint Conference on Neural Networks: 1549–1552.
- Fulda, Nancy; Ventura, Dan (July 2004). "Incremental policy learning: An equilibrium selection algorithm for reinforcement learning agents with common interests". 2004 IEEE International Joint Conference on Neural Networks (IEEE Cat. No.04CH37541) (PDF). Vol. 2. Budapest, Hungary: IEEE International Joint Conference on Neural Networks. pp. 1121–1126. CiteSeerX 10.1.1.160.5147. doi:10.1109/IJCNN.2004.1380091. ISBN 978-0-7803-8359-3. S2CID 10652624.
- Fulda, Nancy; Ventura, Dan (July 2006). "Learning a Rendezvous Task with Dynamic Joint Action Perception". The 2006 IEEE International Joint Conference on Neural Network Proceedings (PDF). Vancouver, British Columbia, Canada: IEEE International Joint Conference on Neural Networks. pp. 627–632. doi:10.1109/IJCNN.2006.246686. ISBN 978-0-7803-9490-2. S2CID 9291621.
- Fulda, Nancy; Ventura, Dan (January 2007). Veloso, Manuela M. (ed.). "Predicting and Preventing Coordination Problems in Cooperative Q-learning Systems" (PDF). Proceedings of the International Joint Conference on Artificial Intelligence. Hyderabad, India: International Joint Conference on Artificial Intelligence: 780–785.

== Awards ==
Year	Organization	Award title, Category	Work	Result	Refs
1998	Mayhew Committee, Brigham Young University	Vera Hinckley Mayhew Award, Short Story (Specialty)	"The Man Who Murdered Himself"	Won	
2004	Phobos Books	Phobos Award	"The Man Who Murdered Himself"	Won	
2011	Baen Books	Jim Baen Memorial Short Story Award, Grand Prize	"That Undiscovered Country"	Won	
2012	Readers of Asimov's Science Fiction	Asimov's Reader's Choice Award	"Movement"	Won	
2012	World Science Fiction Society	Hugo Award, Best Short Story	"Movement"	Nominated	
2012	Science Fiction Writers of America	Nebula Award, Short Story	"Movement"	Nominated	
2012	British Science Fiction Association	BSFA Award, Best Short Fiction (long list)	"Movement"	Nominated	
2013	Association for Mormon Letters	AML Awards, Short Fiction	"Godshift"	Won	
2014	Association for Mormon Letters	AML Awards, Short Fiction	"Recollection"	Nominated	
