= Howard Tayler =

American cartoonist

Howard V. Tayler
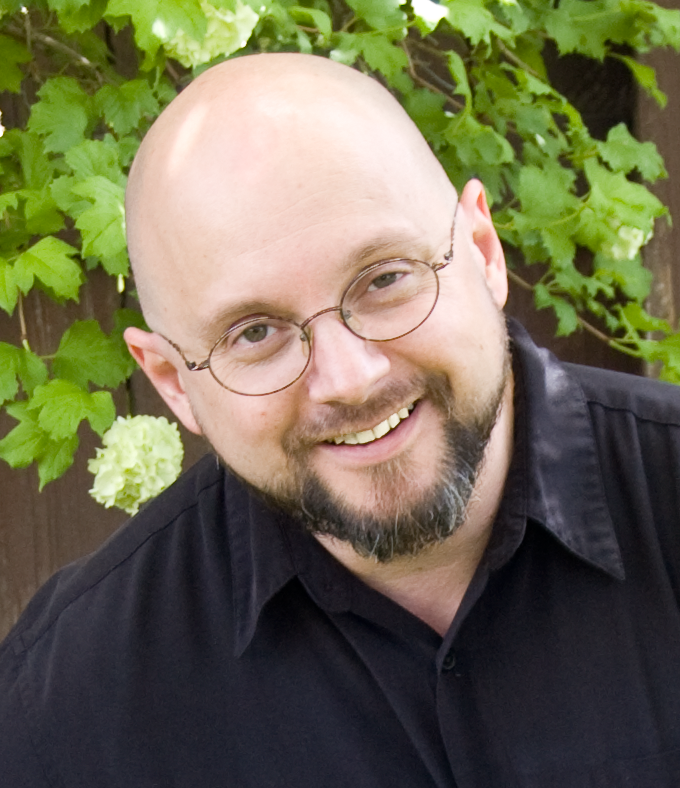
- Born: February 29, 1968 (age 58) Florida, United States
- Areas: Cartoonist, author
- Notable works: Schlock Mercenary
- Awards: Hugo Award (2013); WCCA Best Cameo Award (2001); WCCA Outstanding Science Fiction Comic (2004)
- Spouse: Sandra Tayler
- Relatives: Nancy Fulda (sister-in-law)

Howard V. Tayler (born February 29, 1968, in Florida) is the creator of the webcomic Schlock Mercenary. He worked as a volunteer missionary for the LDS Church, then graduated from Brigham Young University. Using his degree in music composition, he started an independent record label.

While working at Novell, Tayler began online publication of Schlock Mercenary. He quit his job at Novell several years later in order to work on the webcomic full-time. Schlock Mercenary has been nominated multiple times and won the Web Cartoonists' Choice Awards in two different categories, and the webcomic has been nominated four times for a Hugo Award.

Tayler spends time regularly during the week drawing at a local comic book and gaming store, as well as producing a weekly writing tips podcast called Writing Excuses with fellow authors Brandon Sanderson, Dan Wells, Mary Robinette Kowal, and producer Jordan Sanderson. The podcast has been nominated for a Hugo Award in 2011, 2012 and has won in 2013.

== Early life ==
Tayler was born in Florida. In 1985, he moved to Utah (his home as of 2020) to attend Brigham Young University. After studying there for two years, he volunteered to be a missionary for the Church of Jesus Christ of Latter-day Saints (LDS Church) before returning to BYU to finish a bachelor's degree in Music Composition.

== Career ==
Tayler co-founded an independent record label called Sanctus Records for the LDS market. Tayler also worked for Novell as a project manager, and co-authored a guide to administering GroupWise.

In 2000, he began publishing his webcomic, Schlock Mercenary. Four years later, Tayler left his job as product line manager at Novell to work full-time on the webcomic. By 2009, he was able to earn enough from the sales of the compilation books and other merchandise to make ends meet and reduce his weekly workload from 80–100 hours to 40–50.

He was a guest of honor at many genre conventions, including Balticon, CONduit, LepreCon, and Life, the Universe, & Everything. His wife, Sandra, is also a published author.

Schlock Mercenary volume 20 finished in July 2020, and since then Tayler's career has been slowed by health challenges. In May 2024 he attributed his chronic fatigue to long COVID.

== Works ==
In March 2000, Tayler, with co-authors Ross Phillips and Tay Kratzer, composed the guidebook Administering GroupWise 5.5 to assist system administrators in managing Novell's GroupWise.

Tayler's most well-known work is his webcomic, Schlock Mercenary, a comedic webcomic following the tribulations of a star-travelling mercenary company in a satiric, mildly dystopian 31st-century space opera setting. From its debut on June 12, 2000 to its conclusion on 25 July 2020, the comic was updated daily, began to support its author, and was nominated for three Hugo Awards.

Tayler also produces Writing Excuses, along with novelist Mary Robinette Kowal, best-selling fantasy author Brandon Sanderson and horror author Dan Wells. Running weekly since February 10, 2008, this 15-minute writing tips podcast featured notable guests including Steve Jackson, Phil Foglio, Brandon Mull, Tracy Hickman, and Patrick Rothfuss.

Along with best-selling fantasy author Tracy Hickman and his son, Curtis, he illustrated and published XDM: X-Treme Dungeon Mastery.

=== Schlock Mercenary ===
Main series:

1. Schlock Mercenary: Under New Management, ISBN 0-9779074-2-2, May 2006, The Tayler Corporation
2. Schlock Mercenary: The Blackness Between, ISBN 0-9779074-3-0, November 2006, The Tayler Corporation
3. Schlock Mercenary: The Tub of Happiness, ISBN 0-9779074-0-6, December 2007, The Tayler Corporation
4. Schlock Mercenary: The Teraport Wars, ISBN 0-9779074-1-4, October 2008, The Tayler Corporation
5. Schlock Mercenary: The Scrapyard of Insufferable Arrogance, ISBN 0-9779074-4-9, June 2009, The Tayler Corporation
6. Schlock Mercenary: Resident Mad Scientist, ISBN 0-9779074-7-3, July 2010, Hypernode Press
7. Schlock Mercenary: Emperor Pius Dei, ISBN 0-9835746-0-X, July 2011, Hypernode Press
8. Schlock Mercenary: The Sharp End of the Stick, ISBN 0-9835746-2-6, June 2012, Hypernode Press
9. Schlock Mercenary: The Body Politic, ISBN 978-0-9835746-4-4, August 2013, Hypernode Press
10. Schlock Mercenary: Longshoreman of the Apocalypse, ISBN 978-0-9835746-7-5, June 2014, Hypernode Press
11. Schlock Mercenary: Massively Parallel, ISBN 978-0-9835746-8-2, December 2014, Hypernode Press
12. Schlock Mercenary: Force Multiplication, ISBN 978-1-9451200-1-5, August 2016, Hypernode Press
13. Schlock Mercenary: Random Access Memorabilia,
14. Schlock Mercenary: Broken Wind,
15. Schlock Mercenary: Delegates and Delegation,
16. Schlock Mercenary: Big, Dumb Objects, ISBN 9781945120107 March 2021, Hypernode Press
17. Schlock Mercenary: A Little Immortality,

Related works:

- Strohl Munitions Activity and Coloring Book, no ISBN, Jan. 1, 2009, The Tayler Corporation

=== Short fiction ===
- "Flight of the Runewright" (novelette), December 2012 in Space Eldritch, ISBN 978-1-4811-7831-0, Cold Fusion Media
- "Extraordinary Zoology" (novella), July 2013, ISBN 978-1-939480-31-6, Privateer Press
- "Heartfire" (novelette), September 2013 in Called to Battle, Volume One, Privateer Press
- "Fall of the Runewrought" (novelette), November 2013 in Space Eldritch II: The Haunted Stars, ISBN 978-0-615-91859-4, Cold Fusion Media
- "Scrap Ante", March 2014 in Iron Kingdoms Excursions, Season One Volume Two, ISBN 978-1-939480-62-0, Privateer Press
- "Mouths to Feed", April 2014 in Iron Kingdoms Excursions, Season One Volume Three, ISBN 978-1-939480-64-4, Privateer Press
- "Call of the Caber", June 2014 in Iron Kingdoms Excursions, Season One Volume Five, ISBN 978-1-939480-68-2, Privateer Press
- "An Honest Death", July 2014 in Shadows Beneath, ISBN 978-1-938570-03-2, Dragonsteel Entertainment
- "Mind Over Matter" (novelette), December 2014 in Called to Battle, Volume Two, ISBN 978-1-939480-80-4, Privateer Press

=== Games ===
- XDM X-Treme Dungeon Mastery (illustrations, written by Tracy Hickman and Curtis Hickman), ISBN 0-9779074-6-5, July 20, 2009, The Tayler Corporation
- Planet Mercenary (with Alan Bahr and Sandra Tayler), ISBN 978-1-945120-04-6, June 5, 2017, Hypernode Media

=== Non-fiction ===
- Administering GroupWise 5.5 (with Ross Phillips and Tay Kratzer), ISBN 0-07-212329-X, March 20, 2000, McGraw-Hill

== Awards ==
Tayler won the Web Cartoonists' Choice Awards Best Cameo Award in 2001, and was also nominated for Best Comic, Best Writing, Best Other Character, and Best Science-Fiction Comic the same year. He won WCCA Outstanding Science Fiction Comic in 2004, and was nominated for the same award in 2005 and 2007.

He was nominated for the Hugo Award for Best Graphic Story for Schlock Mercenary four times: The Body Politic (2009); The Longshoreman of the Apocalypse (2010); Massively Parallel (2011), and Force Multiplication (2012). Tayler, Dan Wells, Brandon Sanderson, producer Jordan Sanderson, and Mary Robinette Kowal (2011) were nominated for the Hugo Award for Best Related Work in 2011, 2012 and 2013 for the fourth, sixth and seventh seasons of Writing Excuses, a podcast for aspiring authors. They won in 2013.
