= Schlock Mercenary =

Comedic science fiction webcomic

- Schlock Mercenary book 3: Under New Management
- Author: Howard Tayler
- Website: www.schlockmercenary.com
- Current status/schedule: Completed
- Launch date: June 12, 2000; 26 years ago
- End date: July 24, 2020
- Genre(s): Science fiction, comedy

Schlock Mercenary is a comedic webcomic written and drawn by Howard Tayler. It follows the tribulations of a star-travelling mercenary company in a satiric, mildly dystopian 31st-century space opera setting. After its debut on June 12, 2000, the comic was updated daily until its conclusion on July 24, 2020, supporting its author and receiving five Hugo Award nominations.

The comic had been collected into eighteen print volumes as of June 2026, and a nineteenth volume has been announced.

The online comic concluded in July 2020 at the end of the twentieth volume, with an announcement by Tayler that the main story was complete, though spin-offs might be expected in the future.

== Story ==
The story primarily centers on Captain Kaff Tagon, his mercenary crew, Tagon's Toughs, and their roles as members in a for-profit military organization. Various story lines have the crew swept into conflicts on a single planet, a galaxy-spanning apocalyptic crisis or intergalactic war.

In the distant future of Schlock Mercenary's setting, many changes face Terran society. Faster-than-light travel is attained, alien races are contacted, and technology undergoes radical improvements.

Alien species vary from fairly humanoid to almost unrecognizable. There are carbosilicate amorphs with no easily definable limbs or organs (the eponymous Sgt. Schlock), eight-limbed Gatekeepers, two-bodied Uklakk, and the unknowable Pa'anuri, beings made of dark matter.

The number of sapient species descended from Terran stock increased as Earth's genetic engineers refined their craft. Enhanced chimpanzees, gorillas, orangutans, dolphins, snakes, octopuses, at least two types of bears, and two species of elephant have citizenship. Genetic enhancement of the human population resulted in the purple-skinned photosynthetic "Purps", along with general improvements to the population.

=== Technology ===
As in many science fiction stories, technology forms a large part of Schlock Mercenary's storytelling framework. Several story arcs revolve around the political conflict surrounding rapid technological change. After a particularly complex or interesting new system is introduced to the comic, its in-comic explanation is often supplemented with a footnote.

Travel between the stars is accomplished through the use of "wormgates", large wormhole generators controlled by the enigmatic F'sherl-Ganni Gatekeepers. Within the storyline of the comic, wormgates are supplanted by the "teraport", a device allowing near-instant travel between any two points, as long as neither point is within range of an interdicting device. In that case, the teraporting object may be destroyed.

The F'sherl-Ganni also constructed several buuthandi, Schlock Mercenary's take on a Dyson sphere. A buuthandi is a balloon of solar-sail material around a star. Light pressure and solar wind offset the star's gravitation to keep the balloon inflated, while habitats and maintenance facilities dangling from the inner side act as ballast to balance the sails. Despite their tremendous surface area, a buuthandi provides a disproportionally small amount of livable habitat. "Control cables, millions of square kilometers of slack sail material, and some very clever engineering allow the 'balloon' to compensate for (and, in some cases, mitigate) the mood swings of the contained star." In the Schlock Mercenary universe, a buuthandi is about 300 million kilometers in diameter. ("Buuthandi" is a shortened form of a F'sherl-Ganni phrase which, after the foul language is removed, can be roughly translated as "This was expensive to build.")

Medical technology includes nanobots and both artificial and regrown replacements for damaged body parts. One important item in the comic is the "magic cryo-kit", an illegally-modified device with the capability to rebuild an entire body as long as the brain is intact. In the strip, this is shown as "from the head down", but, presumably, nothing more than the brain is necessary. Conventional legal medical technology is also capable of full-body regeneration, although at a much slower pace and dependent on your HMO insurance options. The Toughs employ various technologies to protect survival of heads until their owners can be regenerated. An example of this technology is the comedically ubiquitous "head-in-a-jar", which permits a character to interact in a storyline despite an otherwise-fatal injury. Another is the "nanny-bag", which maintains the severed head and/or entire body of an otherwise mortally-wounded teammate for an unknown length of time. For example, Kevyn Andreyasn's head was sustained for several weeks.

In addition to medical benefits, nanotechnology can "boost" soldiers to levels of physical performance unmodified humans cannot reach. Minor enhancements are legal, but extreme military modifications are highly regulated. Significant examples of soldier-boosting within the strip are the mercenary grunt Nick and the bounty hunter Doythaban, as well as Kevyn in a particular story arc.

Computer hardware has progressed to the point that true, strong artificial intelligence is common, and several artificial intelligences are characters in the story.

Weapons technology drastically improved as well. A mercenary's arsenal can include railguns, lasers, non-lethal nanomotive "goober" rounds, and plasma cannons. Old-fashioned bullet-firing firearms continue to be effective against unprotected targets... and are less likely to rupture a hull than a plasma bolt.

Energy is a resource literally too cheap to meter. Anything powered by miniaturized fusion reactors (which, in the 31st century, are so advanced, they can operate solely on atmospheric gasses), is easily fueled by massively powerful neutronium-annihilation "annie" plants—spherical devices generating massive amounts of power by gravitationally converting mass to energy, a means of power generation made possible by ubiquitous gravity manipulation. One-shot devices (and bombs) are often powered by fullerened antimatter, a carbon-based powder which contains antiprotons at the parts-per-thousand level, and should never be incinerated.

Gravity manipulation is a process as commonplace as modern electronics, employed in starship propulsion and artificial gravity, and weapons and shielding against weapons. Controlled/artificial gravity is referred to as "gravy." Gravitic weapons in particular are common and developed due to their dual purpose—as potent weapons, they can compress matter into neutronium which can then fuel an annie plant. The degree of this control is dependent on the number of projectors. For example, the battleplate Tunguska was able to manipulate individual limbs, and individual digits of crew on board the Serial Peacemaker while smaller ship create nodes of gravity in a few points on the ship and without the same level of control. However, the generation of gravity is beyond the capabilities of the sophonts of the Milky Way, necessitating ships to be constructed around annie plants as sources of gravity to manipulate.

These devices and more are built using fabrication technology, or "fabbers". While rare and expensive, possession of one of these portable factories and the appropriate designs allows for the cheap mass-production of any physical item. Several of the mercenaries are trained in fabber design, allowing the company to cheaply produce and repair their gear.

== Main characters ==
Notable members of the crew include Kevyn Andreyasn; title character Sergeant Schlock, who is a carbosilicate amorph; Petey, a former artificial intelligence and now Fleetmind and pseudo-God; and the wry AI and former boyband, Ennesby.

Sergeant Schlock
The title character, a carbosilicate amorph "everyman" with no easily definable limbs, organs, or moral compass. He normally appears as a large greenish-brown mass coming up to about normal human chest height.

Captain Kaff Tagon
The human leader of the mercenary company "Tagon's Toughs". In early strips of the comic, he exhibited overt sexism, such as proclaiming that "women don't belong in my command structure" and hiring a doctor based on her looks.

Kevyn Andreyasn
Munitions Commander and resident mad scientist, an engineering genius. He has more common sense and faster intuition than most of the members of the mercenary company. He enjoys tinkering with stuff in his lab, being crazy over mechanical stuff as the stereotypical nerd. His most notable invention is the teraport, a teleportation technology which eventually led to full-scale warfare spanning the galaxy when it was made open source.

Breya Andreyasn
Former leader of the mercenaries, now diplomat, and Kevyn's sister. She is highly competent, can operate in a variety of fields, and has little tolerance for disrespect, having once injured Captain Tagon after he purchased power armor for her which featured exaggerated breast sizes. She was first seen collaborating with her brother on commercializing his "teraport" stardrive, handling marketing and business aspects.

Ennesby
Ennesby is an AI with Tagon's Toughs who looks like a "flying maraca" (the shape of his first physical body). He has human-looking eyes, a speaker grille in front that moves like a mouth, and floating eyebrows. The maraca is capable of withstanding chemical explosives at point-blank range. His various additional capabilities include short-ranged levitation and a maser.

Post-Dated Check Loan ("Petey")
The artificial intelligence of the massive warship of the same name, originally the Sword of Inevitable Justice. Driven mad by a gruesome mutiny, Petey existed in a state of total introversion, rendering the ship nearly inoperative, until coaxed back to reality by the mercenary company. He controls the ship's every function and manifests an avatar in the form of a floating hologram of an Ob'enn, the koala-like race of warmongering xenophobes that constructed him.

Chief Warrant Officer Gunther Thurl
His job entails sitting at a console, and that, coupled with a tendency to snack and some genetic predispositions, meant he used to be obese. Because of a botched mission during which Schlock ate everything but his head, his body had to be regrown. He is now a lot slimmer than what he was used to. When the company added several new recruits (including Andy and Legs, q.v.), he was promoted to Chief Warrant Officer. Due to his experience and age, Thurl handles many of the administrative tasks that the current ship AI, Tagii, and Ennesby do not or are not authorized to do.

Doctor Edward Bunnigus
Originally hired by Captain Tagon for her well-endowed figure, she has consistently demonstrated an ability to deal with every situation Tagon's Toughs encounters. Less of a mercenary than many of her fellow officers, she concentrates on keeping the trigger-happy mercenaries alive. Her gender-inappropriate name, sizable intellect, and absurd proportions are the consequence of idiot parents and pre-birth gene therapy. Her parents wanted a child who had both a brilliant mind and the body proportions of an exotic dancer, because they thought their child should be both smart and beautiful. When the parents first looked upon the baby, the serial code on the tag on her wrist started with "E.D.", for exotic dancer. Her parents, nowhere near as bright as she would one day be, assumed that 'Ed' was her name, and called the girl Edward. She is married to Reverend Theo Fobius.

Ellen "Elf" Foxworthy
Elf began as a powered-armor soldier until a failed bounty hunt. She then became a tank pilot (her small size allowing her to fit into the Ob'Enn minitanks Petey had schematics for), and rose to become the head of her own minitank team.

The Very Reverend Theo Fobius
The company priest of an unspecified but fairly Christianesque faith, Theo is still a mercenary and has shown considerable theological flexibility when confronted with such things as an AI that goes explosively suicidal at the thought of the supernatural. His name, assuming it is derived from Greek, most fittingly means "God-Fearing".

Alexia Murtaugh
Tagon's Toughs first encountered Murtaugh when she was serving as head of security company "Sanctum Adroit" at the Haven Hive habitat. She was later fired from her security company and joined Tagons's Toughs. She started at the bottom, but due to her long military experience she was later made a captain when the mercenary company obtained new ships.

== Publication history ==
Creator Howard Tayler at CONduit in 2007.

Over time, Tayler's art improved, in his words, from bad to "marginally less bad." Jean Elmore served as colorist for the strip from February 9, 2003, to the spring of 2004 when she developed a repetitive strain injury from her work.

On March 3, 2003, the comic reached its 1001st strip. Tayler marked the milestone by "re-launching" the comic. With the relaunch, the strip was slightly reoriented for publication, organizing the comic's ongoing story into "books". Each book has a fairly self-contained story, although they are still chronological and connected. On December 2, 2005, Tayler published the comic's 2000th daily strip since the series' debut. On June 12, 2010, Schlock Mercenary marked ten years of uninterrupted daily run, a feat matched by few other webcomics.

In March 2006, Tayler published Schlock Mercenary: Under New Management, the first book-based collection of Schlock Mercenary comics. This collection features stories printed from March 9, 2003, through August 23, 2003, plus five pages of new material including a foreword by John Ringo, a feature explaining how Sgt. Schlock "got turned on to plasma cannons", bonus art, the author's biography, and architectural deck plans to Tagon's third ship Serial Peacemaker.

In December 2007, Tayler published Schlock Mercenary: The Tub of Happiness. It features stories from the beginning of the webcomic to October 2001, as well as the bonus story "Baggage Claim," explaining the circumstances around Schlock joining the Toughs. There are numerous pieces of fan art throughout the book, as well as early concept art drawn by Tayler and notes to the reader from both Tayler and his wife, talking about the characters and Tayler's early cartooning efforts.

On Monday, February 17, 2014, Tayler announced that the strip had reached 5,000 comics. On Tuesday, June 11, 2019, Tayler announced that the strip had reached 19 years of continuous daily comics.

=== Schlocktoberfest ===
Schlocktoberfest was a mostly-annual storyline that occurred during the month of October prior to 2009. The story arc generally started out typically, but soon developed a dark tone, usually involving gruesome events and often character death, before typically resolving itself at the end of the month. The last year with a Schlocktoberfest storyline was 2008, and Tayler has stated that he is no longer doing it.

=== Collections ===
Collections of Schlock Mercenary strips were originally published in book form by "The Tayler Corporation", and are now published through Hypernode Press. Tayler's wife, Sandra, is the publisher. The first published collection, Under New Management does not start at the beginning of the archive, but at the 1001st strip, when the strip was relaunched. The first 1,000 strips were published later in books 1 and 2.

Released and announced book titles are as follows:

1. The Tub of Happiness (ISBN 978-0-9779074-0-3, December 2007)
2. The Teraport Wars (ISBN 978-0-9779074-1-0, October 2008)
3. Under New Management (ISBN 978-0-9779074-2-7, May 2006)
4. The Blackness Between (ISBN 978-0-9779074-3-4, November 2006)
5. The Scrapyard of Insufferable Arrogance (ISBN 978-0-9779074-4-1, June 2009)
6. Resident Mad Scientist (ISBN 978-0-9779074-7-2, July 2010)
7. Emperor Pius Dei (ISBN 978-0-9835746-0-6, July 2011)
8. The Sharp End of the Stick (ISBN 978-0-9835746-2-0, June 2012)
9. The Body Politic (ISBN 978-0-9835746-4-4, August 2013)
10. The Longshoreman of the Apocalypse (ISBN 978-0-9835746-7-5, June 2014)
11. Massively Parallel (ISBN 978-0-9835746-8-2, December 2014)
12. Force Multiplication (ISBN 978-1945120015, August 2016)
13. Random Access Memorabilia (February 2018)
14. Broken Wind (April 2019)
15. Delegates and Delegation (April 2019)
16. Big, Dumb Objects
17. A Little Immortality
18. Mandatory Failure
19. A Function of Firepower

The books were renumbered in 2007 to allow for the release of The Tub of Happiness and The Teraport Wars. Originally, Roman numerals were used, with Under New Management as the first book.

=== The Seventy Maxims of Maximally Effective Mercenaries ===
The Seventy Maxims of Maximally Effective Mercenaries is a popular handbook in the Schlock Mercenary universe, with characters regularly quoting from it. It was originally called The Seven Habits of Highly Effective Pirates, a parody of The Seven Habits of Highly Effective People, but after Tayler received a cease and desist letter from FranklinCovey, he made the retcon on January 24, 2011. Tayler said that the letter "was worded as nicely as such a thing can be".

Two print versions of Seventy Maxims were released:

- Pristine (ISBN 978-1-945120-02-2, December 2016)
- Defaced (has handwritten notes and "stains" from being "used" by the characters) (ISBN 978-1-945120-03-9, February 2017)

=== Games ===
==== Capital Offensive ====
In 2012, Living Worlds Games published Schlock Mercenary: Capital Offensive, a board game based upon the webcomic, to positive reviews from reviewers such as The Dice Tower.

==== Planet Mercenary ====
A role-playing game, based on the comic and written by Alan Bahr and Howard Tayler, was launched as a Kickstarter on April 14, 2015. It successfully funded the following day.

=== Other related works ===
John Ringo's Troy Rising series has been inspired by the Schlock Mercenary universe. It is set in the early days of human-alien contact, but is not considered canon for the comic series.

The webcomic Under the Lemon Tree published a crossover with Schlock Mercenary, though it is non-canon in the Schlock Mercenary continuity.

== Reception and honors ==
The first Schlock Mercenary book publication was covered in Analog Science Fiction and Fact, which described it as "inventive and humorous." The comic tied for outstanding science fiction comic in the Web Cartoonists' Choice Awards in 2004, and was again nominated in 2005 and 2007. The strip won for Best Cameo in the 2001 awards.

Five story collections have been nominated for the Hugo Award for Best Graphic Story: The Body Politic (2009), The Longshoreman of the Apocalypse (2010), Massively Parallel (2011), Force Multiplication (2012), and Random Access Memorabilia (2013).

Schlock Mercenary has also been cited on lists of top web comics published by Wired and Ars Technica.

== See also ==
- Wikimedia fundraiser highlights webcomic community's frustration with Wikipedia guidelines at Wikinews
- List of webcomics
