= The German =

2008 Irish short film

- Directed by: Nick Ryan
- Written by: Nick Ryan; Ruairi Robinson
- Produced by: Olivia Leahy; Ruairi Robinson
- Cinematography: Robbie Ryan
- Edited by: Joe McHugh
- Music by: Brian Crosby; Nick Seymour
- Production companies: Image Now; Bord Scannán na hÉireann / The Irish Film Board; Raidió Teilifís Éireann (RTÉ)
- Release date: 12 July 2008 (Ireland)
- Running time: 10 minutes
- Country: Ireland
- Language: English

The German is a 2008 Irish short film written and directed by Nick Ryan, Starring Toby Kebbell and Christian Brassington. It premiered at the 2008 Cork Film Festival and has subsequently been screened at Palm Springs Film Festival, LA Shorts Fest and São Paulo International Film Festival.

== Synopsis ==
In November 1940, during the Battle of Britain, a duel unfolds between two ace pilots, each willing to take the match to its ultimate conclusion. Unknown to the pilots is a fate neither has considered. They crash-land in neutral Ireland, and both are captured by the Irish Defense Forces. On the truck bringing them into custody, the German pilot offers a cigarette to the Englishman. After a few seconds of surprise, he accepts. They both understand that the war is over for them.

== Cast ==
- Toby Kebbell
- Christian Brassington
- Glenn Mullins
- Gary Murphy
- David Ryan
