= BlinkyTM =

- Film poster
- Directed by: Ruairí Robinson
- Written by: Ruairí Robinson
- Produced by: Marshall Rawlings; Nick Ryan
- Starring: Max Records; Ruairí Robinson; Jenni Fontana; James Nardini; Joe Childs; Skoti Collins; Antal Kalik
- Edited by: Ruairí Robinson
- Music by: Ólafur Arnalds
- Production companies: Imagine Now Films; Alturas Films; Logolite Entertainment
- Release date: March 20, 2011
- Running time: 14 minutes
- Countries: Ireland; United States

BlinkyTM (stylized as Blinky™) is a 2011 Irish-American short science fiction-horror film written, edited, and directed by Ruairí Robinson. The film stars Max Records, Robinson, Jenni Fontana and James Nardini. It tells the story of a boy who adopts a robot, but later neglects it, until the robot complies with commands to murder. The film was released on March 20, 2011.

== Plot ==
In the near future, where robotics have greatly evolved, Alex is looking for the normal loving family that he doesn't have - his parents are always too busy fighting with each other to worry about the effect on him. After seeing an advertisement for a domestic robot named Blinky, he asks his parents for one for Christmas, hoping that it will bring his family together as is shown in the advert. Blinky's advertisement and conduct at this point indicate that Blinky is specifically designed to provide friendship to its masters. After obtaining Blinky and playing with him for a while, shown in a home-video style montage, Alex feels disappointment in the fact that Blinky hasn't changed anything and his parents continue to argue. Eventually, Alex becomes tired of the robot and ignores him, even when Blinky persistently asks to play games.

After leaving Blinky to count down from 1 million outside in the rain in a game of Hide and Seek, Alex becomes frustrated and gives Blinky multiple conflicting orders, such as telling him to be still and at the same time cleaning up, as well as telling him to kill both his parents, himself, their dog and everyone else in his rage, leading Blinky to malfunction. After Alex informs his mother about the glitched robot and that they need to buy a new one, she suggests rebooting him, and that Alex must clean up the mess he made or she will tell Blinky to ″clean and cook him for dinner". Alex reboots Blinky, apparently reverted to factory settings, and he asks Alex, "Will you be my best friend?". Alex continues to ignore Blinky as normal.

Soon afterwards, Blinky starts to behave abnormally, such as showing up in Alex's room overnight, and continuing the count down from before. The next day the family dog appears to be gone, with Alex believing that the robot had something to do with it. He tells his mother his forebodings, but she thinks he's just already tired of Blinky and wants a new robot. The next day Alex goes into another rage with Blinky, throwing an electronic tablet at him. The tablet simply shatters glass throughout the room, causing no damage to Blinky. When he notices the mess Alex has made, he gets even angrier and blames that on Blinky, so he retreats to the kitchen to "clean", counting down from 10 and grabbing an electric knife from the drawers, proclaiming, "Ready or not, here I come!" That evening, both parents are eating meatballs at the table, with Blinky present and Alex's seat empty. As Mrs. Neville asks Blinky if he has seen Alex, the robot replies that he's right there at the table, revealing that he has carried out both his and her "commands" from before: he has killed Alex, cleaned him and cooked him for dinner, which they're now eating. The parents scream and cough in horror as Blinky asks if he has "done good".

While a TV advertisement orders the people to contact immediately if Blinky acts abnormally, the police arrive at the house as Blinky is cleaning up the Nevilles' blood. He lets two officers into the house, and shuts the door behind them. The last shot shows Blinky as he kills his next victims, himself and the camera covered in blood, as he carries out Alex's past "command" to kill everybody.

== Cast ==
- Max Records as Alex Neville
- Ruairí Robinson as Blinky (voice)
- Jenni Fontana as Mrs. Neville
- James Nardini as Mr. Neville
- Joe Childs as Blinky's performance capture

== Production ==
BlinkyTM was based on a short story by writer/director Ruairí Robinson. The film was shot in Granada Hills, Los Angeles, California.
