= I Am Not a Serial Killer =

2009 horror novel by Dan Wells

- US version of the cover
- Author: Dan Wells
- Cover artist: Peter Lutjen
- Language: English
- Series: John Wayne Cleaver series
- Genre: Horror, Thriller, Mystery
- Publisher: Tor (US), Headline (UK)
- Publication date: 2009 (UK), 2010 (US)
- Publication place: United States
- Media type: Print hardcover and paperback and Digital
- Pages: 288
- ISBN: 0-7553-4881-8
- Followed by: Mr. Monster
- Website: https://thedanwells.com/index.php/i-am-not-a-serial-killer/

I Am Not a Serial Killer is a 2009 horror novel written by the American author Dan Wells, originally published by Tor Books. It is Wells' debut novel and the first installment in the John Cleaver series. It is followed by five books, and has been published in English, Spanish, French, German, and Russian.

Wells wrote the novel using his own prior knowledge of serial killers. It follows the teenager John Wayne Cleaver, a diagnosed sociopath. He seeks to expose a serial killer that has come to his midwestern hometown. Reception of the novel was mostly positive. A film adaptation was released in 2016.

== Development ==
Prior to writing Serial Killer, author Dan Wells had been fascinated with serial killers and serial killer predictors for years. He used this knowledge, combining it with extensive research on mortuaries and the embalming process, to write the novel. Wells was unable to observe the process in person, but found plenty of information about embalming on his own. He has said that the procedure described in Serial Killer is purposefully "a couple of years behind the times", because the characters run "a very small operation in a very small town". A mortician later complimented Wells on the accuracy of his depiction of the mortuary. For the supernatural aspect, Wells read selections from the genre to confirm the originality of his idea. On his website, Wells wrote that settling on the idea of writing a horror novel felt "like coming home". In developing the character of John Cleaver, Wells wanted to ensure that "the audience could relate to him". He told the Daily Herald:

"The best and most interesting part of [John] as a character is the delicate balance between scariness and relatability. He's a sociopath. He cannot, by definition feel any kind of empathy for you, but in order for the book to work you have to feel empathy for him."

Pertaining to its genre, Wells has stated that "a teenager protagonist means the book is YA (young adult), but my book is 'adult' enough that different markets are treating it very differently: in the UK it's a YA horror, in Germany it's an adult thriller, and in the US it's being marketed to both audiences."

== Plot summary ==
15-year-old John Wayne Cleaver is a diagnosed sociopath who lives above a mortuary owned by his mother and her twin sister, Margaret. His parents named him after actor John Wayne, but he notices that he also shares the name with serial killer John Wayne Gacy. He is obsessed with serial killers, and has extensive knowledge of their behaviors. John himself exhibits a few of these characteristics, such as wetting the bed, fascination with fire, and abusing animals. He fears that he is "destined" to become a serial killer, so lives by a set of rules designed to keep his homicidal impulses in check and keep him "normal". He forces himself not to obsess over any one person, to sit with a boy named Max during lunch to maintain a sort of friendship, and to attend therapy sessions with a counselor, Dr. Neblin.

After a serial killer comes to Clayton County, John decides to throw all his rules aside in order to catch the culprit. As the victims' bodies come to his family's mortuary, John notices that there is a part missing from each: for one, it is a kidney, for another, an arm. His conversations with Dr. Neblin become focused solely on the killer. Soon, John discovers that his neighbor Mr. Crowley is the guilty party; John watches as he transforms into a demon who kills to replace his own failing body parts. In the following weeks, he watches Crowley kill another innocent man, two police officers, and his friend Max's dad. He begins to leave Crowley anonymous notes threatening to expose his true identity. John wonders why Crowley stays in Clayton, then discovers that it is because he truly loves his wife, Kay. John notes this paradox: Crowley is a demon who can love, and he himself is a human who cannot.

John makes the decision to use the demon's weakness against it by sneaking into the house one night while Crowley is gone, knocking Kay out and sending pictures to Crowley. Crowley takes the bait; he returns to the house as John is leaving. However, it is too late: he has killed again, and the body is in his passenger's seat. It is Dr. Neblin, John's counselor. John takes Neblin's body and hides in a shed, hoping that Crowley will grow too sick and die before he can replace his failing organs with Neblin's. John's mother arrives, looking for him in the night. As the demon heads towards her, John runs to her, and the two escape to the embalming room. The demon follows them, and John destroys it using a bladed trocar. In the aftermath of this event, he begins to make an effort both to get to know his mother and to come to know who Mr. Crowley used to be by visiting Kay.

== Reception ==
Critical reception for I Am Not a Serial Killer was mostly positive, with many reviewers stating that the book's twist partway through the novel "may turn off thriller readers who prefer not to mix genres". Author Jack Heath praised the novel as having "plenty of thematic merit", and noted that "all the characters are richly identifiable, including–and I can't stress enough how impressed I was by this–the serial killer...Wells is a first-time novelist, and yet he's already created a sympathetic villain, the holy grail of thriller writing." Kirkus Reviews praised the book for its "completely believable teenage sociopath (with a heart of gold), dark humor, a riveting mystery and enough description of embalming to make any teen squeamish even if they won't admit it." The New York Times bestselling author F. Paul Wilson called it "dazzling and unputdownable". Brandon Sanderson, also a New York Times bestselling author, wrote: "the beauty of the prose, mixed with the depth of characterization, gave the haunting, first person narrative a human touch . . . Regardless of your age or your genre preferences, you will find this story both profound and enthralling."

== Awards and nominations ==
- 2009 Whitney Award for Best Novel by a New Author
- 2009 Whitney Award finalist for Best Speculative Fiction

== Film adaptation ==
Billy O'Brien directed a film adaptation, which stars Christopher Lloyd, Max Records, and Laura Fraser. Animator Toby Froud did design work for the film, while Robbie Ryan was its cinematographer. Daniel M. Gold of The New York Times described the movie as a "well-filmed indie that doesn't let its low budget get in the way of some true chills." It was written by Billy O'Brien and Christopher Hyde. Nick Ryan was the film's producer. A budget of $1.45 million was provided by the Irish Film Board, Quickfire Films, and The Fyzz Facility. Filming took place in Virginia, Minnesota.

== See also ==
- Mr. Monster
