= Dan Wells (author) =

American horror writer

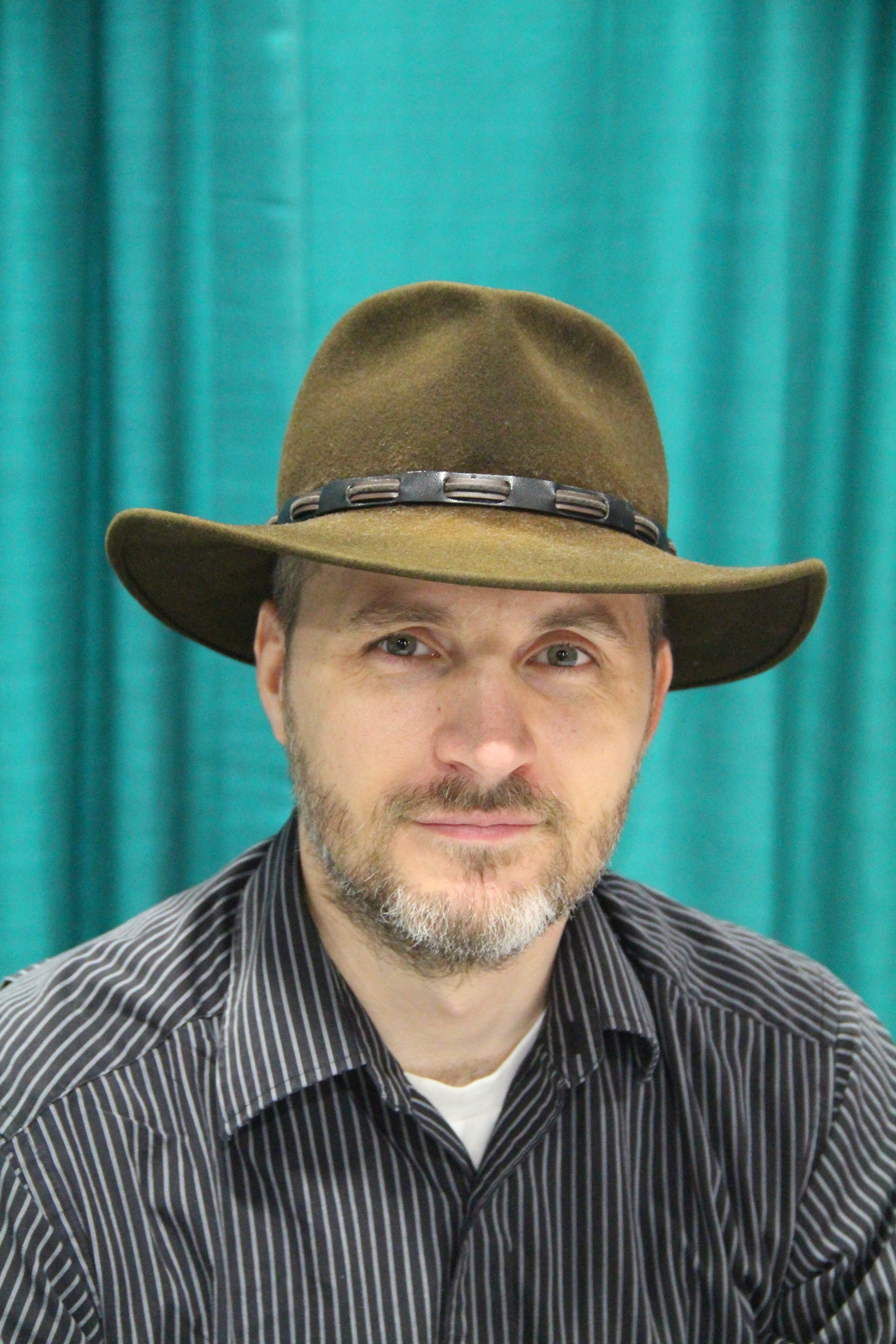
- Wells at the 2015 National Book Festival
- Born: Daniel Andrew Wells; March 4, 1977 (age 49); Utah, United States
- Education: Brigham Young University (BA)
- Occupations: Author, podcast personality
- Spouse: Dawn Wells
- Children: 6
- Writing career
- Period: 2000–present
- Genres: Horror, science fiction, young adult
- Notable work: I Am Not a Serial Killer
- Website: thedanwells.com

Daniel Andrew Wells (born March 4, 1977) is an American horror and science fiction author. Wells's first published novel, I Am Not a Serial Killer, was adapted into a movie in 2016.

== Early life ==
Dan Wells spent his childhood in Salt Lake City, Utah, and began writing at a young age. While in the second grade, he wrote his first stories based on the Choose Your Own Adventure series. He has cited Where the Wild Things Are as one of his first influences. During his childhood, Wells was also exposed to science fiction and fantasy: namely, titles such as The Hobbit and Star Wars. He frequented the library and loved to read. In addition to sci-fi and fantasy novels, he read classics, including those of French and Russian literature. He also enjoyed writing scripts, songs, and poetry as a child.

In high school, Wells wrote a series of comic books, novellas, and a serial. He began to take writing more seriously in college, finishing his first serious novel when he was 22. He studied English and anthropology at Brigham Young University. It was there that he met his wife, Dawn. As a student, Wells also worked on BYU's speculative fiction magazine, Leading Edge, and began writing game reviews; he has since described himself as a "rabid gamer". Before becoming a published novelist, he worked as a corporate writer for NuSkin.

== Career ==
Wells's debut novel, I Am Not a Serial Killer, was published in 2009. It has been printed in English, Spanish, French, German, and Russian. Wells did extensive research to make the novel's protagonist, John Cleaver, appear genuine. His fascination with serial killer predictors also inspired him to write the novel. In 2016, it was adapted into a film, starring Max Records and Christopher Lloyd. Wells wrote a sequel, Mr. Monster, which was published by Tor Books in 2010. In 2011, his third installment to the John Cleaver series, I Don't Want to Kill You, was published. Wells continued John Cleaver's story with a second trilogy, in which the protagonist changes and develops. In 2016, Wells told Deseret News that the fifth book in the series, Over Your Dead Body, was one of the most challenging to write. Some of Wells's novels feature main characters with mental health issues. In Serial Killer, John Cleaver is diagnosed with antisocial personality disorder, and the protagonist of The Hollow City has schizophrenia.

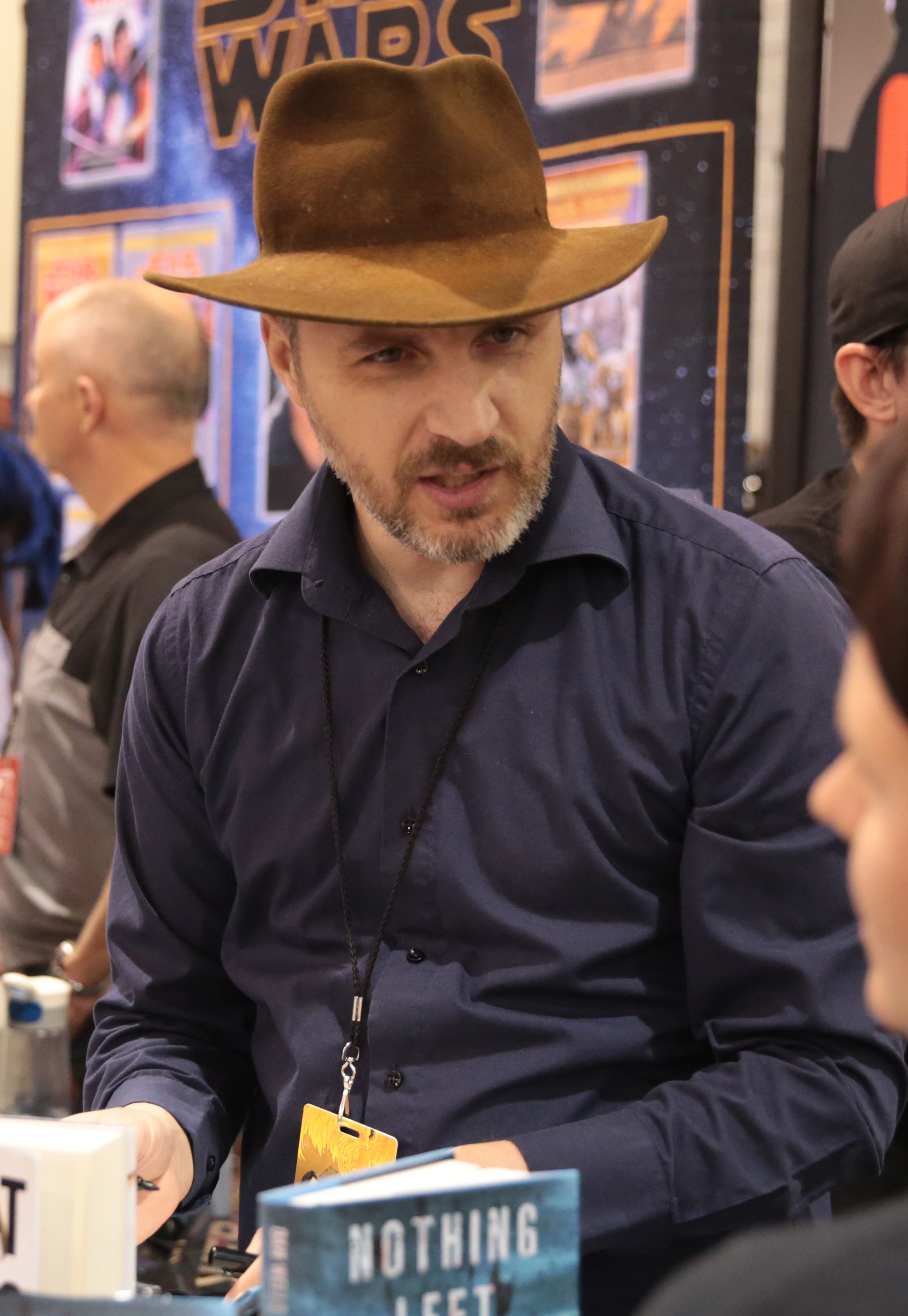
Wells at the 2017 Phoenix Comicon

Wells expanded into young adult dystopia with Partials Sequence in 2012. The series made an appearance on the New York Times Best Seller list for children's series in 2014. He followed up in 2016 with a Young Adult science fiction novel, Bluescreen, set in Los Angeles in the year 2050. He continued this Mirador series with Ones and Zeroes in 2017 and Active Memory in 2018. Other releases include middle-grade sci-fi audiobooks Zero G (2018), Dragon Planet (2019), and Stargazer (2021).

Wells is one of the four authors (including Mary Robinette Kowal, Brandon Sanderson, and Howard Tayler) who regularly host the podcast Writing Excuses. Wells was a writer for the 2017 TV series Extinct and co-wrote his own stage play, "A Night of Blacker Darkness" along with playwright Allison Hill.

In 2022, he became the Vice President of Narrative for Brandon Sanderson's company, Dragonsteel Entertainment.

== Personal life ==
He is the brother of author Robison Wells. He has six children. He has lived in Utah, Mexico, and Germany.

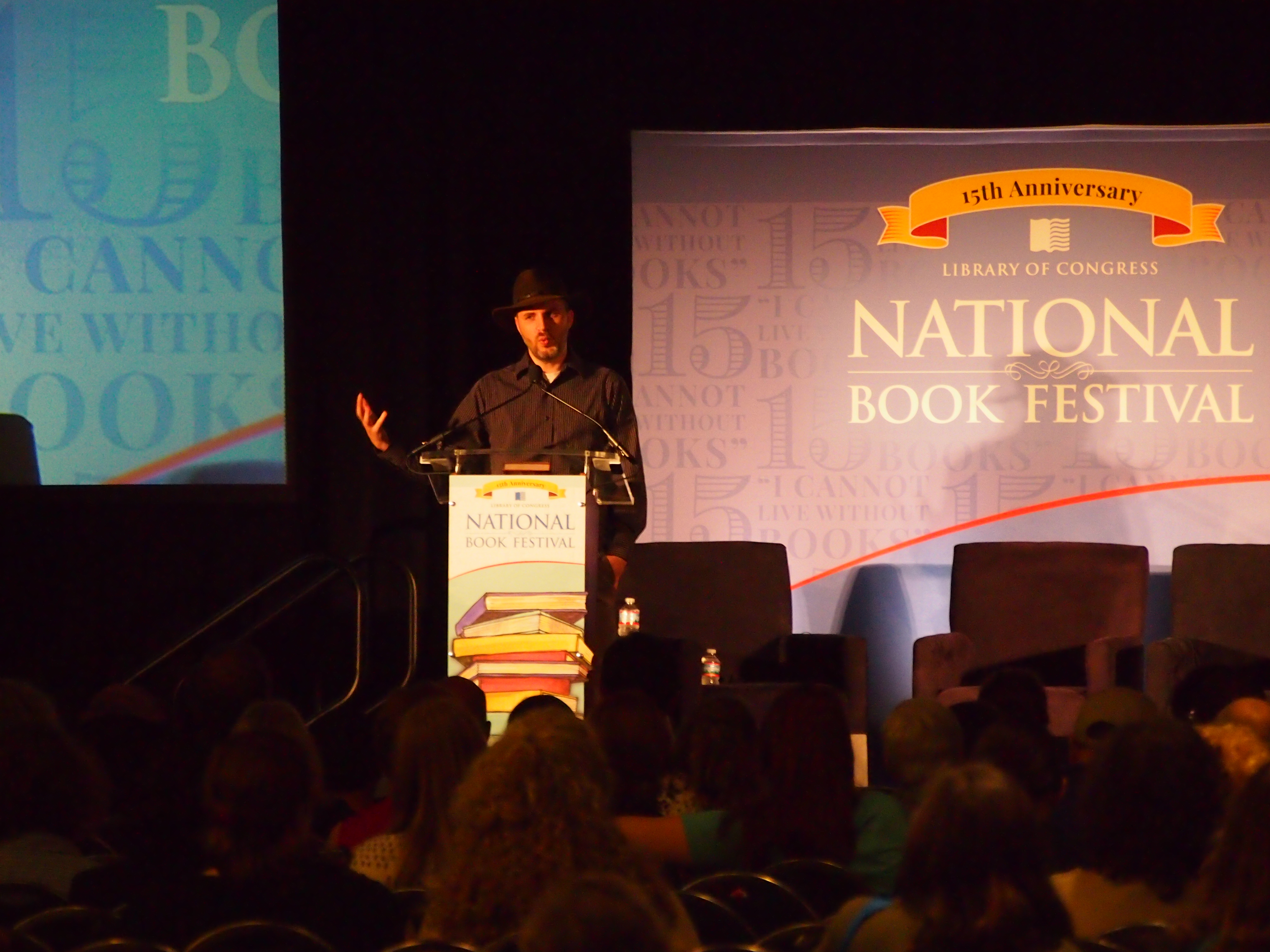
Wells reading at the 2015 National Book Festival

He also has his own YouTube channel on which he reviews tabletop role-playing games. The channel shares his name.

He and author Brandon Sanderson make the podcast Intentionally Blank together where they discuss everything from writing to other fantasy-related topics to their own lives and more.

Wells has described himself as a "card-carrying socialist" and does not like the musical Cats.

He is a member of the Church of Jesus Christ of Latter-day Saints.

== Critical reception ==
School Library Journal described his novel Bluescreen as "exciting and innovative". Another School Library Journal review of Ones and Zeroes complimented Wells' complex and diverse characters, plausible dystopian plot, and understandable descriptions of future technology. Kirkus said that Partials' "rushed ending" signaled there would be a sequel.

In 2011, Wells was nominated for the John W. Campbell Award for Best New Writer. His novella, The Butcher of Khardov, received a nomination for the Hugo Award for Best Novella in 2014; Wells stated that this was the result of his unwittingly having been selected by Larry Correia for the Sad Puppies campaign.

He is a cohost of Writing Excuses, which won the Hugo Award for Best Fancast and three Parsec Awards.

In February 2017, Wells was the Literary Guest of Honor and Keynote Speaker at the 35th annual Life, the Universe, & Everything professional science fiction and fantasy arts symposium.

== Awards ==
- 2009 Whitney Award for Best Novel by a New Author – I Am Not a Serial Killer
- 2010 Whitney Award for Best Novel of the Year – Mr. Monster
- 2011 Whitney Award for Best Novel of the Year – I Don't Want to Kill You
- 2015 Whitney Award for Speculative Fiction – The Devil's Only Friend
- 2016 AML Award for Best Novel – Over Your Dead Body

== Bibliography ==
=== John Wayne Cleaver series ===
- First trilogy
  - —— (2009). I Am Not a Serial Killer. Tor Books. ISBN 9780765322470.
  - —— (2010). Mr. Monster. Tor Books. ISBN 9780755348824.
  - —— (2011). I Don't Want to Kill You. Tor Books. ISBN 9780755348831.
- —— (2014). Next of Kin. Fearful Symmetry. ISBN 9780692246030.
- Second trilogy
  - —— (2015). The Devil's Only Friend. Tor Books. ISBN 9783492269957.
  - —— (2016). Over Your Dead Body. Tor Books. ISBN 9783492280242.
  - —— (2017). Nothing Left to Lose. Tor Books. ISBN 9780765380715.

=== Partials Sequence ===
- —— (2012). Isolation. Balzer + Bray. ISBN 9780062208187.
- —— (2012). Partials. Balzer + Bray. ISBN 9780062071040.
- —— (2013). Fragments. Balzer + Bray. ISBN 9780062071071.
- —— (2014). Ruins. Balzer + Bray. ISBN 9780062071101.

=== Mirador series ===
- —— (2016). Bluescreen. Balzer + Bray. ISBN 9780062347879.
- —— (2017). Ones and Zeroes. Balzer + Bray. ISBN 9780062347909.
- —— (2018). Active Memory. Balzer + Bray. ISBN 9780062347930.

=== The Zero Chronicles ===
- —— (2018). Zero G. Audible Originals.
- —— (2019). Dragon Planet. Audible Originals.
- —— (2021). Stargazer. Audible Originals.

=== Apocalypse Guard ===
- The Apocalypse Guard (with Brandon Sanderson, forthcoming)

=== Stand-alone novels ===
- —— (2011). A Night of Blacker Darkness. Fearful Symmetry. ISBN 9781466000759. Written as "Fred Whithers".
- —— (2012). The Hollow City. Tor Books. ISBN 9780765331700.
- —— (2016). Extreme Makeover. Tor Books. ISBN 9780765385628.
- —— (2019). Ghost Station. Audible Originals.

=== Novellas ===
- The Butcher of Khardov. Privateer Press. 2013. ISBN 9781939480323.

=== Short stories ===
- "The Amazing Adventures of George" in Leading Edge #40 (September 2000)
- "Charybdis" in Leading Edge #61 (June 2011)
- "The Mountain of the Lord" in Monsters & Mormons edited by Theric Jepson and Wm. Morris (October 2011, Peculiar Pages, ISBN 978-0-9827812-4-1)
- "Elsecaller" (2024) With Brandon Sanderson. Released as part of a collectible card set. Republished in a bundled volume the following year by Dragonsteel books.
- "Chasmfriends Get a Pet!" (2024) With Brandon Sanderson for the same card set; to be adapted in future as a picture book.

=== Editorials ===
- How to Write Good (September 2000), in Leading Edge #40

== Additional reading ==
- Interview with Teenreads, March 2, 2017
