= Max Records =

American former actor

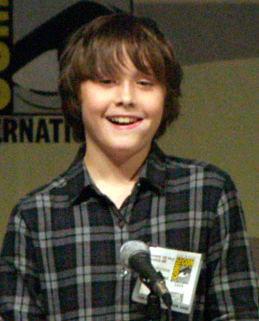
- Records at San Diego Comic-Con in 2009
- Born: June 18, 1997 (age 29); Portland, Oregon, United States
- Education: Metropolitan Learning Center
- Occupation: Actor
- Years active: 2006–2016

Max Records (born June 18, 1997) is an American former actor. He is known for his roles as Max in the film Where the Wild Things Are, for which he won the 2009 Young Artist Award for Best Leading Young Actor in a Feature Film, and as Slater Pedulla in The Sitter. He starred in the lead role of John Wayne Cleaver in the 2016 film titled I Am Not A Serial Killer, based on Dan Wells' 2009 novel of the same name, which received positive reviews and ratings. He has also appeared as a guest on The Tonight Show.

== Personal life ==
Records was born in Portland, Oregon, the son of Shawn Records, a photographer, and Jenny, a librarian.

Records attended Metropolitan Learning Center, a public K-12 school, for most of his childhood. He then transferred to Trillium Charter School for the rest of high school.

== Career ==
Records first became famous for the main role in Where the Wild Things Are when he was hired personally by Spike Jonze. Records' father, who is a photographer, was asked to send the company information of actors fitting a certain description; his son happened to fit the criteria, so his information was also provided.

Before being cast in Where the Wild Things Are, Records starred in a music video for the band Death Cab for Cutie.

After Where the Wild Things Are, his most notable roles are Young Stephen in The Brothers Bloom and Slater Pedula in The Sitter.

Records co-starred with Christopher Lloyd as John Wayne Cleaver in the film I Am Not a Serial Killer, shot in 2015 and released in early 2016. Rolling Stone described the role as "a homicidal Midwestern teen who has to kill a mass murderer in order to stop becoming one himself".

== Filmography ==
=== Film ===
Year	Title	Role	Notes
2006	Directions	Brother	Video; Segment: "Stable Song"
2009	Where the Wild Things Are	Max	Won Young Artist Award for Best Leading Young Actor in a Feature Film, for 2009. Nominated for multiple other awards.
2009	The Brothers Bloom	Young Stephen	
2010	The Vampire Attack	Boy in Cemetery	Short
2011	BlinkyTM	Alex Neville	Short
2011	The Sitter	Slater Pedulla	
2016	I Am Not a Serial Killer	John Wayne Cleaver	Fangoria Chainsaw Award for Best Actor

=== Video games ===
Year	Title	Role
2009	Where the Wild Things Are	Max

== Awards ==
Year	Award	Category	Result
2009	Young Artist Award	Best Leading Young Actor in Feature Film	Won
2016	British Film Institute Festival	Best Leading Actor	Nominated
