= Mr. Monster =

2010 horror novel by Dan Wells

- Cover art for Mr. Monster
- Author: Dan Wells
- Language: English
- Series: John Cleaver Trilogy
- Genre: Horror
- Publisher: Tor (US), Headline (UK)
- Publication date: 2010
- Publication place: United States
- Media type: Print hardcover and paperback; audiobook
- Award: 2010 Whitney Award for Novel of the Year
- ISBN: 9780765362377
- OCLC: 794790953
- Preceded by: I Am Not a Serial Killer
- Followed by: I Don't Want to Kill You

Mr. Monster is a young adult horror novel by Dan Wells, published in 2010 by Tor Books and by Headline. It is the sequel to I Am Not a Serial Killer and the second book in the John Wayne Cleaver series. The book focuses on the dual threats of the conflict between John and his darker side, which he calls "Mr. Monster", as well as the emergence of a second serial killer in Clayton County. Reviewers have praised both the continuation of the series' plot and the depth found in John's characterization. The novel was the co-winner of the 2010 Whitney Award for Novel of the Year. It has been published in English, Spanish, French, Russian, Czech, and Croatian. An audiobook of the novel is available, narrated by Kirby Heyborne. The sequel to this book, I Don't Want to Kill You, was released in March 2011.

== Development ==
Wells had not planned to write a sequel novel, but after the success of I Am Not a Serial Killer, his publisher requested that the book be expanded into a trilogy. Like the first book, Mr. Monster required research into offender profiling and embalming.

Wells has described Mr. Monster as "about half as gory as the first book, but at least twice as creepy". He focused on balancing John Cleaver's sympathetic and frightening sides. He has also commented that writing the sequels to Serial Killer "really helped me grow as a writer, by forcing me to dig deeper into the character and find new ways to challenge him and myself." This protagonist calls the darker part of his personality "Mr. Monster", which was one of the aliases employed by serial killer David Berkowitz, also known as the "Son of Sam."

== Plot ==
In the aftermath of the Clayton Killer, John Wayne Cleaver struggles to balance his desire to do and be good with his darker side, which he calls "Mr. Monster" and which he previously let loose in order to save the town. His mom is now aware of his rules and helps to enforce them, but refuses to confront the reality that the Clayton Killer, posing as Mr. Crowley, was actually a demon. John frequently meets with an FBI investigator, Agent Forman, but is careful not to reveal any information about the supernatural activity he witnessed or the fact that he himself killed Crowley. When Agent Forman informs John of a new murder victim, he begins to suspect that a new serial killer – possibly a demon – is on the loose. John then meets his sister Lauren's new boyfriend, Curt, whose behavior earns him the top spot on John's list of suspects. Meanwhile, he grows closer to Brooke and decides to ask her out on a date – despite his recurring nightmares about harming her. When they attend the school bonfire, another body is found in the lake. As John examines the evidence, he realizes the new killer is imitating Crowley; this time, however, the victims were tortured prior to their death.

While John assists his mother in embalming the body at the family mortuary, Lauren reveals that Curt has hit her. This triggers Mr. Monster's emergence; in order to curb his urge to kill Curt, John burns down an old warehouse and kills a cat. He begins to wonder if it is even possible to corral Mr. Monster at all. He takes Brooke on a second date, during which a news report reveals that a third body has been found. John rushes to Agent Forman's office, only to discover that he knows about Crowley's being a demon. Moreover, Forman himself is a demon, part of a network that has been searching for Mkhai – the being that took over Crowley's body – for the past 40 years. He keeps the women he's kidnapped – his "toys" – at a house outside Clayton. Forman takes John there, and tempts him with the opportunity to harm and kill the women, but John resists. Instead, he discovers that Forman is a different type of demon; his special power is being able to feel exactly what the people around him are feeling. Once John tells the trapped women of his discovery, they use it against him; one of the women sacrifices herself so that Forman will become weak enough for John to kill. However, Forman recovers, leaves the house, and brings back Curt as an offering to John. John resists the temptation a second time, instead distracting Forman with the story of how Mkhai fell in love with Kay Crowley. This gives Forman an idea, and he returns to the house with Brooke. In his absence, John constructed a trap for Forman by running an electrical current to his torture devices and hiding the wires. John has to pretend that he is going to harm Brooke in order to get Forman to fall for the trap; it works, and Forman's body melts. John saves most of the women, but Curt lights the house on fire before he can save one who had been trapped in the wall.

John wakes up in the hospital, and the police inform him that the testimonies of the women of his heroics have cleared him of any charges. Later, Brooke comes by to break up with John, saying she doesn't want to confront the truth about what happened back at the house, and hands him Forman's phone. He finds the phone numbers of other demons, and calls one named "Nobody," telling her to come find him. Slaying demons offers him an outlet for Mr. Monster.

== Reception ==
Critical reception of Mr. Monster was mostly positive, with multiple reviewers highlighting Wells's further development of both the protagonist and plot. A Savannah Morning News review complimented John Cleaver's characterization as "a nifty balancing act for Wells to have pulled off". Lee Mandelo praised Wells's expansion of Serial Killer into a series, stating: "If his own blog hadn't told me otherwise, I would never have guessed he hadn't intended a sequel from the beginning". Alternative Magazine also commended Wells's continuation of the storyline, saying that Mr. Monster "immediately addresses any faults with its predecessor's ending" while keeping the "strong aspects of the original story". Kirkus Reviews noted that "John's realistic familial relationships and friendships offer a counterbalance to the bloody, fantastical elements of the tale" and recommended the novel for "fans of genre mash-ups". A School Library Journal reviewer described Mr. Monster as "compelling, quick-paced, and chilling". Publishers Weekly wrote that the book "stands out with taut, sharp writing, strong plotting, vivid angst, and a compelling portrayal of a disturbed man's struggles for self-control".

== Awards and nominations ==
- 2010 Whitney Award for Novel of the Year (tied with The Way of Kings by Brandon Sanderson)
- 2010 Whitney Award finalist for Best Speculative Fiction

== See also ==
- I Am Not a Serial Killer
- I Am Not a Serial Killer (film)
- I Don't Want to Kill You
