= I Am Not a Serial Killer (film) =

- Theatrical release poster
- Directed by: Billy O'Brien
- Written by: Christopher Hyde; Billy O'Brien
- Based on: I Am Not a Serial Killer by Dan Wells
- Produced by: James Harris; Mark Lane; Nick Ryan
- Starring: Max Records; Laura Fraser; Christopher Lloyd; Christina Baldwin
- Cinematography: Robbie Ryan
- Edited by: Nick Emerson
- Music by: Adrian Johnston
- Production companies: Irish Film Board; Quickfire Films; The Fyzz Facility
- Distributed by: Bulldog Film Distribution
- Release dates: 13 March 2016 (SXSW); 26 August 2016 (United States)
- Running time: 103 minutes
- Countries: Ireland; United Kingdom
- Language: English
- Budget: $1.4 million

I Am Not a Serial Killer is a 2016 supernatural psychological horror film directed by Billy O'Brien and based on Dan Wells' 2009 novel of the same name. It stars Christopher Lloyd, Max Records, Laura Fraser, and Christina Baldwin.

Shooting began in Virginia, Minnesota, on 28 February 2015. It premiered at the South by Southwest Film Festival on 13 March 2016 and received limited theatrical and video-on-demand release on 26 August.

== Plot ==
John Wayne Cleaver, a teenager in a small Midwestern town, is a diagnosed sociopath and has a morbid obsession with death and serial killers. He works at his mother April's funeral home as a part-time assistant mortician. He controls his homicidal urges with strict rules, mental stopgaps, and sessions with his therapist Grant.

At the scene of a murder, John sees a puddle of black oil. An identical murder sparks rumors of a serial killer, which piques John's interest. While out trick-or-treating with his friend Max, John spots a drifter lurking outside his neighbor Bill Crowley's house. At the high school Halloween dance, John scares off a bully by threatening to kill him.

John sees the drifter join Crowley on an ice fishing trip, and follows them. Out in the water, as the drifter is about to attack Crowley, Crowley kills the man with his bare hand, which morphs into a branch-like shape. Crowley cuts out his own lungs and replaces them with the man's.

John creates a serial killer profile, noting every victim had organs removed. John follows Crowley and his wife Kay on their date night. As Crowley was limping because of a weak leg, a local barber named Greg invites Kay for a dance.

John comes across his mother and Grant having dinner, which upsets him. John later researches fairytales and mystic folklore. The police connect the recent murders to a missing person named Emmett Openshaw.

John follows Crowley to Greg's barbershop and sees Crowley attack Greg. John impulsively sets off the barbershop's alarm, drawing two police officers, whom Crowley kills. Crowley leaves the barbershop, appearing to be rejuvenated and without a limp. John sees a puddle of black oil at the scene and realizes it was Crowley's old leg, which he replaced with Greg's.

After leaving Crowley an anonymous note revealing his knowledge, John overhears Kay saying Crowley has been housebound for a week. As John visits Crowley at Kay's request, Crowley recites and explains William Blake's poems "The Lamb" and "The Tyger". John continues to profile Crowley, who grows weaker.

On Christmas Eve, John calls Crowley from a pay phone to ask about the process and what he stole from Openshaw. Crowley gives vague answers, and John realizes Crowley was stalling. Seeing Crowley's car, John flees to Max's house. After admitting their friendship was merely a coping mechanism, John is thrown out. John stumbles upon Crowley killing Max's father; John, wearing a ski mask, fails to stop Crowley and flees.

After Max's father's memorial, April tries to connect with John, who threatens her life when she pushes him. After a conversation with Grant, John waits until Crowley leaves the house and tries to scare him away by threatening what he loves most: Kay. When John believes he has unintentionally killed Kay, he panics and calls Grant. After seeing she is still alive, John leaves the house as Crowley arrives. In Crowley's car, he finds Grant's intact body, which he hides. The next morning, Crowley realizes John has taken the body. At Max's father's funeral, Crowley reveals Grant had been out looking for John. John says Crowley will not try anything in public and observes that Crowley's heart will not last much longer.

After the funeral, John realizes his mother did not leave; he finds her unconscious on the embalming table beside Crowley, who demands John return Grant's body. John pretends to agree but knocks out Crowley. After April regains consciousness, they hook Crowley up to the embalming device. When Crowley wakes, the lights flicker, and a large, black, oily monster slides out of his body. Realizing he can no longer be with Kay, he asks John to watch over her and commits suicide. Both Crowley and the monster's corpses melt into black oil.

The police find Grant's body, and Crowley is reported missing. John comforts Kay, who tells him the story of how she and Crowley fell in love, making John realize he can find happiness, too. John and his mother later have a conversation as they embalm Grant's body.

== Cast ==
- Max Records as John Wayne Cleaver
- Christopher Lloyd as Bill Crowley
- Laura Fraser as April Cleaver
- Christina Baldwin as Aunt Margaret
- Karl Geary as Dr. Grant Neblin
- Dee Noah as Kay Crowley
- Lucy Lawton as Brooke
- Anna Sundberg as Lauren Bacall Cleaver
- Raymond Branstrom as Max Bowen
- Michael Paul Levin as Roger Bowen
- Vincent Risso as Rob Anders
- Tony Papenfuss as Ron the Coroner
- Matt Roy as Drifter
- Jim Gaulke as Principal Layton
- Tim Russell as Greg Olson the barber
- Bruce Bohne as Minister
- Andrew Björklund as Pawn Shop Clerk
- Elizabeth Belfiori as Rachel
- William Todd-Jones as Jeb Jolley/The Monster

== Production ==
Author Dan Wells' novel I Am Not a Serial Killer was first released in 2009 and in the United States in 2010. Irish writer and director Billy O'Brien, who had previously written and directed the 2006 horror film Isolation, adapted the novel for the screen with co-writer Christopher Hyde, and was intending to shoot the film on 16 mm film. Robbie Ryan worked on the film as a producer as well as director of photography. Other producers include O'Brien, Nick Ryan, James Harris, and Mark Lane. Toby Froud served as a creature designer, with William Todd-Jones being the creature movement consultant. Jennifer Klide served as production designer. The Irish Egg Post Production performed postproduction work for the film.

Funding for I Am Not a Serial Killer was provided by the Irish Film Board, The Fyzz Facility, and Quickfire Films. The English firm Independent will manage international sales of the film. Its budget totals around $1.45 million.

Principal photography began in the US state of Minnesota on February 28, 2015. Centered in the town of Virginia on the Mesabi Iron Range, the film's producers had hoped to shoot somewhere in the North and ultimately chose the area—despite the book's setting of North Dakota—in part because of the Iron Range Resources and Rehabilitation Board. Through its Film Production Incentive program, the Board can reimburse almost $93,000 of eligible production costs. Michigan and Ohio were also considered as filming locations. Local extras were utilized as part of the shoot, which concluded on March 20 before the production team moved to other cities in Minnesota including Saint Paul and Golden Valley to film several scenes set during the autumn.

== Release ==
I Am Not a Serial Killer premiered at the South by Southwest Film Festival on March 13, 2016. The movie received simultaneous limited theatrical and video on demand releases on August 26. It won the Méliès d’argent at the Festival du Film Fantastique de Strasbourg in 2016

A trailer for the film was released on July 8.

== Reception ==
On Rotten Tomatoes, the film holds an approval rating of 93% based on 57 reviews, with a weighted average rating of 6.85/10. The site's critical consensus reads, "I Am Not A Serial Killer honors the book it's based on with a well-acted drama that leavens its gore and dark themes with wry humor." Metacritic, which uses a weighted average, assigned the film a score of 54 out of 100, based on 11 critics, indicating "mixed or average" reviews.

Mark Kermode of The Guardian gave it 4 stars and said ''This satirically frightening picture feels like a lost film from another age, from the retro red titles to the analogue score''.

== See also ==
- Summer of 84
- Super Dark Times
