= We Called Them Giants =

2024 graphic novel by Kieron Gillen and Stephanie Hans

- Cover art
- Date: November 12, 2024
- Publisher: Image Comics

Creative team
- Writer: Kieron Gillen
- Artist: Stephanie Hans
- Letterer: Clayton Cowles

Original publication
- Date of publication: October 30, 2024
- Language: English
- ISBN: 978-1-5343-8707-2

We Called Them Giants is a post-apocalyptic graphic novel by writer Kieron Gillen and artist Stephanie Hans. It was published by Image Comics on October 30, 2024.

The graphic novel focuses on Lori, a recently adopted teenager, who awakens to a mysteriously depopulated world and, alongside classmate Annette, struggles to survive roaming gangs, monstrous wolves, and giant aliens. Reuniting the creative team Gillen and Hans, this dystopian graphic novel explores themes of grief and trust. We Called Them Giants was a finalist for the 2025 Hugo Award for Best Graphic Story or Comic.

== Premise ==
We Called Them Giants follows the teenage Lori who wakes in a world where nearly every human has disappeared. She and her classmate Annette face survivalist threats, such as roaming gangs, food scavenging and monstrous wolves, in a post-apocalyptic world as giant aliens arrive on Earth.

== Publication history ==
Writer Kieron Gillen and artist Stephanie Hans had previously collaborated on the comic books Journey into Mystery (2012) and Die (2018–2021); they were joined by letterer Clayton Cowles who had also previously worked with them on Die. Gillen stated that after they finished Die, he and Hans "wanted to do something smaller and self-contained. A short, beautiful graphic novel where we can both stretch in ways we've never done before"; he called the graphic novel format for We Called Them Giants a "luxury". Hans explained it was a "joy" as an artist "to work on new challenges" and that Gillen "wrote an emotional story in which he let me go wild on designs. [...] It's nothing like we did before. In all the best ways". We Called Them Giants was published by Image Comics on October 30, 2024, with a wide release on November 12, 2024, by distributor Simon & Schuster.

In terms of comparisons to other media, Gillen commented that it is "kind of Pixar does The Walking Dead, with a little of Ted Hughes'" novel The Iron Man (1968), noting that "the original is far creepier" than The Iron Giant (1999) film adaptation. Gillen explained that the story emerged "from the isolation of the Covid lockdowns" while he was in his house with his cats and "thinking about the weirdness of how these two alien species get on (or not)". He stated:

That's the heart of the book – communication across a chasm of comprehension, at the end of the world. A girl. A giant. Understanding or not. And love. It's a book about love, and the difficulties of that. It's also a book about hitting things with a hockey stick covered in barbed-wire.

== Reception ==
Kirkus Reviews stated that We Called Them Giants focuses on teenage Lori and her classmate Annette who survive threats in a world where "nearly everyone has disappeared" and then "Supernatural Giants arrive, seemingly from space, speaking an impenetrable language". They noted that the "tone of the story then subtly shifts from post-apocalyptic desperation to one that's somewhat playful". Sean Dillon of The Beat called the graphic novel "a truly stellar work by some of the best artists in the business", noting that the "story is a rather straight forward tale of two girls surviving in a postapocalyptic landscape full of roaming gangs, carnivorous wolves, and inhuman giants". April Spisak, for the academic journal The Bulletin of the Center for Children's Books, highlighted that while Lori is practiced in loneliness, "nothing could have prepared her for the sudden disappearance of nearly everyone on Earth" so she is "inordinately lucky" to find an ally in the "practical" and "survival-oriented" Annette. Spisak noted that while Annette's "attitude keeps them alive", it is "Lori's dogged optimism" that provides the hope they need to keep going. Spisak commented that "the poignant, bitter journey of Lori's clawing toward emotional growth and openness is captured with an understated eloquence here". Peter Dabbene of Foreword Reviews called it "a thrilling graphic novel about alien contact on a postapocalyptic Earth". Dabbene commented that "the story is fueled by bold narrative decisions", noting the "mass disappearance of humans and arrival of the aliens are kept mysterious", which builds "tension and intrigue as" characters are left to piece together the truth "through guesswork and experience". He also highlighted the "satisfying" second narrative thread which focuses on "Lori's emotional breakthroughs and rediscoveries of how to trust". Thom Dunn of Boing Boing praised the graphic novel's "cleverness", noting that it begins with "simple characters and two huge mysteries", but by the end, readers become "more invested in the people than the mystery and your own relationship with the giants that surround you – and that's truly the mark of a good story". He added that We Called Them Giants has "the trappings of a classic young adult fantasy film from the 80s or 90s" with the ability to hold "up into adulthood" and that cinematic quality is enhanced by its release "as a complete graphic novel" rather than "in serialized installments to be later collected as a single edition, like most Western comic books".

Publishers Weekly highlighted that reunited collaborators Gillen and Hans "deliver a gripping but underexplored dystopian graphic novel. Though the breakneck pace is sometimes overwhelming, first-person focused vignettes arranged in dynamic composition and rendered in electric color palettes drive this propulsive adventure about grief and trust". Dillon opined that the "main draw" of We Called Them Giants is Hans as she is "one of the great comics artists of the modern era, whose water painted style feels right at home in this decaying natural landscape. Of particular note is the first page we see one of the titular giants" which have "a neon quality" and as the colors lean "mostly towards darker shades of red, yellow, and turquois, one is immediately drawn to the out of place nature of the giant, even if one discounts the fact that it's a giant". Dillon also commended the character design work. Spisak similarly noted the effective use of color, "with the ruby red and emerald-green giants sharply contrasting to each other, both several shades brighter and more vivid than the washed out, bleak blues, grays, and browns that are used elsewhere". Spisak commented that "perspective is key" and highlighted the size of the "visually stunning" giants, "particularly when a human is near one and barely reaches their ankles". Kirkus Reviews highlighted that "Hans' artwork and paneling fill each scene with wonders" and "after a certain point, a visual element that appears early on takes on clear significance and meaning in the context of the story at large, offering a subversively humorous twist for readers to consider and a creative element that deviates from other alien invasion narratives". Austin Manchester of AIPT commented that "Hans's artwork complements Gillen's script tremendously well", highlighting the depiction of "the titular giants as both beautiful and mysterious but also frightening". Manchester stated that the graphic novel "contains some of my favorite writing from Gillen" and his "prose runs throughout the book as Lori narrates the story in a way that makes it almost feel like you're reading a novel – a gorgeously, gorgeously illustrated novel". Dillon noted that while "survivalist fiction" is "a genre Gillen has never worked in before", post-apocalypse benefits "Gillen's skills as a writer".

ICv2 highlighted that ComicHub, a point of sale tracking system which provides a "non-random sample" from "stores selling American comics around the world", listed We Called Them Giants for three months – #8 on "Top 20 Graphic Novels by Units" and #15 on "Top 20 Graphic Novels by Dollars" in October 2024, #9 on "Top 20 Graphic Novels by Units" and #7 on "Top 20 Graphic Novels by Dollars" in November 2024, and #14 on "Top 20 Graphic Novels by Units in December 2024.

=== Accolades ===
Year	Award	Category	Result	Ref.
2024	Foreword Indies	Graphic Novels & Comics (General)	Silver Winner	
2025	Hugo Award	Best Graphic Story or Comic	Finalist	
