= Hugo Award for Best Graphic Story or Comic =

Annual award for science fiction or fantasy

- Awarded for: The best science fiction or fantasy story told in graphic form and published in the prior calendar year
- Presented by: World Science Fiction Society
- First award: 2009
- Most recent winner: Ursula K. Le Guin (original story), and Fred Fordham (adaptation and art) (A Wizard of Earthsea: A Graphic Novel)
- Website: Official website

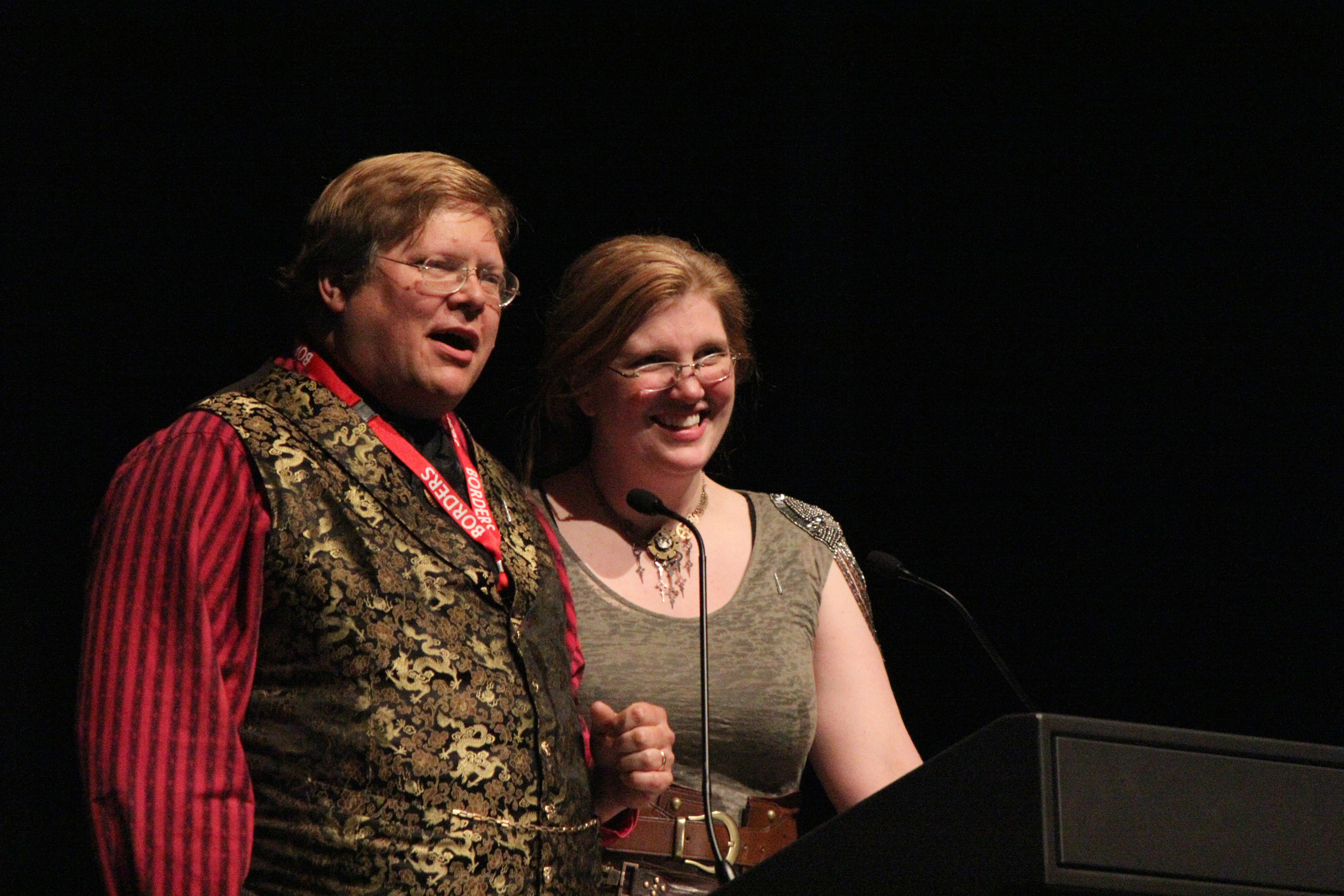
Phil Foglio and Kaja Foglio accept the 2010 Hugo Award for Best Graphic Story, for Girl Genius.

The Hugo Award for Best Graphic Story or Comic is given each year for science fiction or fantasy stories told in graphic form and published or translated into English during the previous calendar year. It has been awarded annually since 2009. Prior to 2020, the award was known as the Hugo Award for Best Graphic Story. The Hugo Awards have been described as "a fine showcase for speculative fiction" and "the best known literary award for science fiction writing".

In the 21 nomination years, 118 works from 76 series have been finalists, including Retro-Hugos. Works from 15 different series have won the award, including Retro-Hugos. Girl Genius, written by Kaja and Phil Foglio, drawn by Phil Foglio, and colored by Cheyenne Wright, won the first three awards. After their third straight win in 2011, the Girl Genius team announced that, in order to show the category was a "viable award", they were refusing nomination for the following year (after which the award was up for re-ratification); Girl Genius was a finalist a fourth time in 2014. For the following five years, the award was taken by a different series or work every year, and included both webcomics and installments of published series. The 2017–2019 awards saw the second series to win three times, Marjorie Liu and Sana Takeda's Monstress, and has been followed since by different works each year with the exception of 2024, when Brian K. Vaughan and Fiona Staples's Saga won for a second time. The three Retro Hugos were won by early comic books such as Bill Finger and Bob Kane's Batman #1, William Moulton Marston and H. G. Peter's Wonder Woman #5: "Battle for Womanhood", and Jerry Siegel and Joe Shuster's Superman: "The Mysterious Mr. Mxyzptlk". Saga has the most final ballot nominations at eight, followed by Monstress at seven and Howard Tayler's Schlock Mercenary at five, while Bill Willingham's Fables, Brian K. Vaughan and Cliff Chiang's Paper Girls, and Alex Raymond's Flash Gordon have been nominated four times. Nine other works have at least two nominations.

== Selection ==
Hugo Award nominees and winners are chosen by supporting or attending members of the annual World Science Fiction Convention, or Worldcon, and the presentation evening constitutes its central event. The selection process is defined in the World Science Fiction Society Constitution as instant-runoff voting with six finalists, except in the case of a tie as happened in 2009. The graphic stories on the ballot are the six most-nominated by members that year, with no limit on the number of stories that can be nominated. Initial nominations are made by members in January through March, while voting on the ballot of six finalists is performed roughly in April through July, subject to change depending on when that year's Worldcon is held. Prior to 2017, the final ballot was five works; it was changed that year to six, with each initial nominator limited to five nominations. Worldcons are generally held near the start of September, and are held in a different city around the world each year. In addition to the regular Hugo awards, between 1996 and 2025, Retrospective Hugo Awards or "Retro-Hugos" were available for works published 50, 75, or 100 years prior. Retro-Hugos could only be awarded for years after 1939 in which no awards were originally given. Retro-Hugo awards were given for graphic stories only for 1941 and 1944.

== Winners and finalists ==
In the following table, the years correspond to the date of the ceremony, rather than when the story was first published. Entries with a yellow background have won the award; those with a gray background are the other finalists.

* Winners and joint winners

Winners and finalists
Year	Work	Creator(s)	Publisher(s)	Ref.
2009	Girl Genius, Volume 8: Agatha Heterodyne and the Chapel of Bones*	Kaja Foglio (writer), Phil Foglio (writer, artist), Cheyenne Wright (colorist)	Airship Entertainment	
2009	The Dresden Files: Welcome to the Jungle	Jim Butcher (writer), Ardian Syaf (artist)	Del Rey Books/Dabel Brothers Productions	
2009	Fables: War and Pieces	Bill Willingham (writer), Mark Buckingham (penciller), Steve Leialoha (artist), Andrew Peopy (artist), Lee Loughridge (colorist), Todd Klein (letterist)	Vertigo Comics	
2009	Schlock Mercenary: The Body Politic	Howard Tayler (writer, artist)	The Tayler Corporation	
2009	Serenity: Better Days	Joss Whedon (writer), Brett Matthews (writer), Will Conrad (artist), Michelle Madsen (colorist), Jo Chen (cover)	Dark Horse Comics	
2009	Y: The Last Man, Volume 10: Whys and Wherefores	Brian K. Vaughan (writer), Pia Guerra (penciller), Jose Marzan, Jr. (inker)	Vertigo Comics	
2010	Girl Genius, Volume 9: Agatha Heterodyne and the Heirs of the Storm*	Kaja Foglio (writer), Phil Foglio (writer, artist), Cheyenne Wright (colorist)	Airship Entertainment	
2010	Batman: Whatever Happened to the Caped Crusader?	Neil Gaiman (writer), Andy Kubert (penciller), Scott Williams (inker)	DC Comics	
2010	Captain Britain and MI13. Volume 3: Vampire State	Paul Cornell (writer), Leonard Kirk (penciller), Mike Collins (penciller), Adrian Alphona (penciller), Ardian Syaf (penciller)	Marvel Comics	
2010	Fables: The Dark Ages	Bill Willingham (writer), Mark Buckingham (penciller), Steve Leialoha (artist), Peter Gross (artist), Andrew Peopy (artist), Mike Allred (artist), David Hahn (artist), Lee Loughridge (colorist), Laura Allred (colorist), Todd Klein (letterist)	Vertigo Comics	
2010	Schlock Mercenary: The Longshoreman of the Apocalypse	Howard Tayler (writer, artist)	The Tayler Corporation	
2011	Girl Genius, Volume 10: Agatha Heterodyne and the Guardian Muse*	Kaja Foglio (writer), Phil Foglio (writer, artist), Cheyenne Wright (colorist)	Airship Entertainment	
2011	Fables: Witches	Bill Willingham (writer), Mark Buckingham (artist)	Vertigo Comics	
2011	Grandville Mon Amour	Bryan Talbot (writer, artist)	Dark Horse Comics	
2011	Schlock Mercenary: Massively Parallel	Howard Tayler (writer, artist)	Hypernode	
2011	The Unwritten, Volume 2: Inside Man	Mike Carey (writer), Peter Gross (artist)	Vertigo Comics	
2012	Digger*	Ursula Vernon (writer, artist)	Sofawolf Press	
2012	Fables: Rose Red	Bill Willingham (writer), Mark Buckingham (artist)	Vertigo Comics	
2012	Locke & Key Volume 4: Keys To The Kingdom	Joe Hill (writer), Gabriel Rodriguez (artist)	IDW Publishing	
2012	Schlock Mercenary: Force Multiplication	Howard Tayler (writer, artist)	The Tayler Corporation	
2012	The Unwritten, Volume 4: Leviathan	Mike Carey (writer), Peter Gross (artist)	Vertigo Comics	
2013	Saga, Volume 1*	Brian K. Vaughan (writer), Fiona Staples (artist)	Image Comics	
2013	Grandville Bête Noire	Bryan Talbot (writer, artist)	Dark Horse Comics	
2013	Locke & Key Volume 5: Clockworks	Joe Hill (writer), Gabriel Rodriguez (artist)	IDW Publishing	
2013	Schlock Mercenary: Random Access Memorabilia	Howard Tayler (writer, artist)	The Tayler Corporation	
2013	Saucer Country, Volume 1: Run	Paul Cornell (writer), Ryan Kelly (artist), Jimmy Broxton (artist), Goran Sudžuka (artist)	Vertigo Comics	
2014	"Time"*	Randall Munroe	xkcd	
2014	Girl Genius, Volume 13: Agatha Heterodyne & The Sleeping City	Kaja Foglio (writer), Phil Foglio (writer, artist), Cheyenne Wright (colorist)	Airship Entertainment	
2014	The Girl Who Loved Doctor Who	Paul Cornell (writer), Jimmy Broxton (artist)	IDW Publishing	
2014	The Meathouse Man	Raya Golden (artist), George R. R. Martin (original work)	Jet City Comics	
2014	Saga, Volume 2	Brian K. Vaughan (writer), Fiona Staples (artist)	Image Comics	
2015	Ms. Marvel, Volume 1: No Normal*	G. Willow Wilson (writer), Adrian Alphona (artist), Jake Wyatt (artist)	Marvel Comics	
2015	Rat Queens, Volume 1: Sass and Sorcery	Kurtis J. Weibe (writer), Roc Upchurch (artist)	Image Comics	
2015	Saga, Volume 3	Brian K. Vaughan (writer), Fiona Staples (artist)	Image Comics	
2015	Sex Criminals, Volume 1: One Weird Trick	Matt Fraction (writer), Chip Zdarsky (artist)	Image Comics	
2015	The Zombie Nation Book #2: Reduce Reuse Reanimate	Carter Reid	The Zombie Nation	
2016	The Sandman: Overture*	Neil Gaiman (writer), J. H. Williams III (artist)	Vertigo Comics	
2016	The Divine	Boaz Lavie (writer), Asaf Hanuka (artist), Tomer Hanuka (artist)	First Second Books	
2016	Erin Dies Alone	Grey Carter (writer), Cory Rydell (artist)	dyingalone.net	
2016	Full Frontal Nerdity	Aaron Williams	ffn.nodwick.com	
2016	Invisible Republic, Volume 1	Corinna Bechko (writer), Gabriel Hardman (writer, artist)	Image Comics	
2017	Monstress, Volume 1: Awakening*	Marjorie Liu (writer), Sana Takeda (artist)	Image Comics	
2017	Black Panther, Volume 1: A Nation Under Our Feet	Ta-Nehisi Coates (writer), Brian Stelfreeze (artist)	Marvel Comics	
2017	Ms. Marvel, Volume 5: Super Famous	G. Willow Wilson (writer), Takeshi Miyazawa (artist)	Marvel Comics	
2017	Paper Girls, Volume 1	Brian K. Vaughan (writer), Cliff Chiang (artist), Matthew Wilson (colorist), Jared Fletcher (letterer)	Image Comics	
2017	Saga, Volume 6	Brian K. Vaughan (writer), Fiona Staples (artist), Fonografiks (letterer)	Image Comics	
2017	The Vision, Volume 1: Little Worse Than A Man	Tom King (writer), Gabriel Hernandez Walta (artist)	Marvel Comics	
2018	Monstress, Volume 2: The Blood*	Marjorie Liu (writer), Sana Takeda (artist)	Image Comics	
2018	Bitch Planet, Volume 2: President Bitch	Kelly Sue DeConnick (writer), Valentine De Landro (artist), Taki Soma (artist), Kelly Fitzpatrick (colorist), Clayton Cowles (letterer)	Image Comics	
2018	Black Bolt, Volume 1: Hard Time	Saladin Ahmed (writer), Christian Ward (artist), Clayton Cowles (letterer)	Marvel Comics	
2018	My Favorite Thing Is Monsters	Emil Ferris (writer, artist)	Fantagraphics Books	
2018	Paper Girls, Volume 3	Brian K. Vaughan (writer), Cliff Chiang (artist), Matthew Wilson (colorist), Jared Fletcher (letterer)	Image Comics	
2018	Saga, Volume 7	Brian K. Vaughan (writer), Fiona Staples (artist)	Image Comics	
2019	Monstress, Volume 3: Haven*	Marjorie Liu (writer), Sana Takeda (artist)	Image Comics	
2019	Abbott	Saladin Ahmed (writer), Sami Kivelä (artist), Jason Wordie (colorist), Jim Campbell (letterer)	Boom! Studios	
2019	Black Panther: Long Live the King	Nnedi Okorafor (writer), Aaron Covington (writer), André Lima Araújo (artist), Mario Del Pennino (artist), Tana Ford (artist)	Marvel Comics	
2019	On a Sunbeam	Tillie Walden (writer, artist)	First Second Books	
2019	Paper Girls, Volume 4	Brian K. Vaughan (writer), Cliff Chiang (artist), Matthew Wilson (colorist), Jared Fletcher (letterer)	Image Comics	
2019	Saga, Volume 9	Brian K. Vaughan (writer), Fiona Staples (artist)	Image Comics	
2020	LaGuardia*	Nnedi Okorafor (writer), Tana Ford (artist), James Devlin (colorist)	Berger Books / Dark Horse Comics	
2020	Die, Volume 1: Fantasy Heartbreaker	Kieron Gillen (writer), Stephanie Hans (artist), Clayton Cowles (letterer)	Image Comics	
2020	Monstress, Volume 4: The Chosen	Marjorie Liu (writer), Sana Takeda (artist)	Image Comics	
2020	Mooncakes	Suzanne Walker (writer), Wendy Xu (artist), Joamette Gil (letterer)	Oni Press / Lion Forge Comics	
2020	Paper Girls, Volume 6	Brian K. Vaughan (writer), Cliff Chiang (artist), Matt Wilson (colorist), Jared K. Fletcher (letterer)	Image Comics	
2020	The Wicked + The Divine, Volume 9: Okay	Kieron Gillen (writer), Jamie McKelvie (artist), Matt Wilson (colorist), Clayton Cowles (letterer)	Image Comics	
2021	Parable of the Sower: A Graphic Novel Adaptation*	Octavia E. Butler (original author), Damian Duffy (writer), John Jennings (artist)	Abrams Books	
2021	Die, Volume 2: Split the Party	Kieron Gillen (writer), Stephanie Hans (artist), Clayton Cowles (letterer)	Image Comics	
2021	Ghost-Spider, Volume 1: Dog Days Are Over	Seanan McGuire (writer), Takeshi Miyazawa (artist), Rosie Kämpe (artist)	Marvel Comics	
2021	Invisible Kingdom, Volume 2: Edge of Everything	G. Willow Wilson (writer), Christian Ward (artist)	Dark Horse Comics	
2021	Monstress, Volume 5: Warchild	Marjorie Liu (writer), Sana Takeda (artist)	Image Comics	
2021	Once & Future, Volume 1: The King Is Undead	Kieron Gillen (writer), Dan Mora (artist), Tamra Bonvillain (colorist), Ed Dukeshire (letterer)	Boom! Studios	
2022	Far Sector*	N. K. Jemisin (writer), Jamal Campbell (artist)	DC Comics	
2022	Die, Volume 4: Bleed	Kieron Gillen (writer), Stephanie Hans (artist), Clayton Cowles (letterer)	Image Comics	
2022	Lore Olympus, Volume 1	Rachel Smythe (writer, artist)	Del Rey Books	
2022	Monstress, Volume 6: The Vow	Marjorie Liu (writer), Sana Takeda (artist)	Image Comics	
2022	Once & Future, Volume 3: The Parliament of Magpies	Kieron Gillen (writer), Dan Mora (artist), Tamra Bonvillain (colorist)	Boom! Studios	
2022	Strange Adventures	Tom King (writer), Mitch Gerads (artist), Evan "Doc" Shaner (artist)	DC Comics	
2023	Cyberpunk 2077: Big City Dreams*	Bartosz Sztybor (writer), Filipe Andrade (artist), Alessio Fioriniello (artist), Roman Titov (colorist), Krzysztof Ostrowski (colorist)	Dark Horse Comics	
2023	Dune: The Official Movie Graphic Novel	Lilah Sturges (writer), Drew Johnson (artist), Zid (colorist)	Legendary Comics	
2023	Monstress, Volume 7: Devourer	Marjorie Liu (writer), Sana Takeda (artist)	Image Comics	
2023	Once & Future, Volume 4: Monarchies in the UK	Kieron Gillen (writer), Dan Mora (artist)	Boom! Studios	
2023	Saga, Volume 10	Brian K. Vaughan (writer), Fiona Staples (artist), Fonografiks (letterer)	Image Comics	
2023	Supergirl: Woman of Tomorrow	Tom King (writer), Bilquis Evely (artist), Matheus Lopes (colorist)	DC Comics	
2024	Saga, Volume 11*	Brian K. Vaughan (writer), Fiona Staples (artist)	Image Comics	
2024	Bea Wolf	Zach Weinersmith (writer), Boulet (artist)	First Second Books	
2024	Shubeik Lubeik	Deena Mohamed	Pantheon Graphic Library	
2024	The Three Body Problem, Part One	Cai Jin (writer), Ge Wendi (writer), Bo Mu (writer), Caojijiuridong (artist), Liu Cixin (original novel)	Zhejiang Literature and Art Publishing House	
2024	The Witches of World War II	Paul Cornell (writer), Valeria Burzo (artist)	TKO Studios	
2024	Wonder Woman Historia: The Amazons	Kelly Sue DeConnick (writer), Phil Jimenez (artist), Gene Ha (artist), Nicola Scott (artist)	DC Comics	
2025	Star Trek: Lower Decks – Warp Your Own Way	Ryan North (writer), Chris Fenoglio (artist)	IDW Publishing	
2025	The Deep Dark	Lee Knox Ostertag	Graphix	
2025	The Hunger and the Dusk: Vol. 1	G. Willow Wilson (writer), Chris Wildgoose (artist)	IDW Publishing	
2025	Monstress, Volume 9: The Possessed	Marjorie Liu (writer), Sana Takeda (artist)	Image Comics	
2025	My Favorite Thing Is Monsters, Book 2	Emil Ferris	Fantagraphics	
2025	We Called Them Giants	Kieron Gillen (writer), Stephanie Hans (artist), Clayton Cowles (letterer)	Image Comics	
2026	A Wizard of Earthsea: A Graphic Novel*	Fred Fordham (writer and artist), Ursula K LeGuin (original novel)	Clarion Books/Walker Books	
2026	Absolute Wonder Woman Vol. 1: The Last Amazon	Kelly Thompson (writer), Hayden Sherman (artist), Mattia de Iulis (artist), Jordie Bellaire (colorist), Becca Carey (letterer)	DC Comics	
2026	A Girl and Her Fed	KB Spangler (writer), Ale Presser (artist)	www.agirlandherfed.com	
2026	The Invisible Parade	Leigh Bardugo (writer), John Picacio (artist)	Little, Brown Books for Young Readers/Orion Books	
2026	The Power Fantasy Volume 1: The Superpowers	Kieron Gillen (writer), Caspar Wijngaard (artist), Clayton Cowles (letterer)	Image Comics	
2026	The Space Cat	Nnedi Okorafor (writer), Tana Ford (artist)	First Second Books	

=== Retro Hugos ===
Between the 1996 Worldcon and 2025 Worldcon, the World Science Fiction Society had the concept of "Retro-Hugos", in which the Hugo award could be retroactively awarded for 50, 75, or 100 years prior. Retro-Hugos could only be awarded for years after 1939 (the year of the first Worldcon) in which no Hugos were originally awarded. The only times the Graphic Story category both existed and received enough nominations to support a Retro Hugo category was in 2016 for 1941, 2019 for 1944, and 2020 for 1945.

Retro Hugo winners and nominees
Year	Year awarded	Work	Creator(s)	Publisher(s)	Ref.
1941	2016	Batman #1*	Bill Finger (writer), Bob Kane (artist)	Detective Comics (DC Comics)	
1941	2016	Captain Marvel: "Introducing Captain Marvel"	Bill Parker, C. C. Beck	Whiz Comics #2 (Fawcett Comics)	
1941	2016	Flash Gordon: "The Ice Kingdom of Mongo"	Alex Raymond, Don W. Moore	King Features Syndicate	
1941	2016	The Origin of the Spirit	Will Eisner	Register and Tribune Syndicate	
1941	2016	The Spectre: "The Spectre"/"The Spectre Strikes!"	Jerry Siegel (writer), Bernard Baily (artist)	More Fun Comics	
1944	2019	Wonder Woman #5: "Battle for Womanhood"*	William Moulton Marston (writer), H. G. Peter (artist)	DC Comics	
1944	2019	Buck Rogers: "Martians Invade Jupiter"	Philip Francis Nowlan (writer), Dick Calkins (artist)	National Newspaper Service	
1944	2019	Flash Gordon: "Fiery Desert of Mongo"	Alex Raymond (writer, artist)	King Features Syndicate	
1944	2019	Garth	Steve Dowling (writer, artist)	Daily Mirror	
1944	2019	Plastic Man #1: "The Game of Death"	Jack Cole (writer, artist)	Vital Publications	
1944	2019	The Adventures of Tintin: The Secret of the Unicorn	Hergé (writer, artist)	Le Soir	
1945	2020	Superman: "The Mysterious Mr. Mxyzptlk"*	Jerry Siegel (writer), Ira Yarbrough (artist), Joe Shuster (artist)	Detective Comics (DC Comics)	
1945	2020	Buck Rogers: "Hollow Planetoid"	Dick Calkins (artist)	National Newspaper Service	
1945	2020	Donald Duck: "The Mad Chemist"	Carl Barks (writer, artist)	Dell Comics	
1945	2020	Flash Gordon: "Battle for Tropica"	Alex Raymond (writer, artist)	King Features Syndicate	
1945	2020	Flash Gordon: "Triumph in Tropica"	Alex Raymond (writer, artist)	King Features Syndicate	
1945	2020	The Spirit: "For the Love of Clara Defoe"	Manly Wade Wellman (writer), Lou Fine (artist), Don Komisarow (artist)	Register and Tribune Syndicate	

== See also ==
- Nebula Award for Best Comics
