= Once & Future =

Comic book series

- Issue 1 cover

Publication information
- Publisher: Boom! Studios
- Format: Ongoing series
- Genre: Dark fantasy
- Publication date: August 2019 – October 2022
- No. of issues: 30

Creative team
- Created by: Kieron Gillen and Dan Mora
- Written by: Kieron Gillen
- Artist: Dan Mora
- Colorist: Tamra Bonvillain

Once & Future is a horror comic by Kieron Gillen, with art by Dan Mora and colors by Tamra Bonvillain, about King Arthur. It is published by Boom! Studios.

== Synopsis ==
When a group of British nationalists perform a supernatural ritual in order to resurrect King Arthur, they discover that Arthur has his own agenda. As Arthur leaves a trail of death and destruction in his wake, octogenarian Bridgette McGuire — a retired monster hunter — and her grandson Duncan must try to stop him before other creatures from stories begin emerging as well.

== Reception ==
The first Once & Future trade paperback (Once & Future: The King is Undead, comprising issues #1-6) was a finalist for the 2021 Hugo Award for Best Graphic Story, the third trade paperback (Once & Future: The Parliament of Magpies) was a finalist for the 2022 award, and the fourth trade paperback (Once & Future: Monarchies in the UK) was a finalist for the 2023 award.

Screen Rant calls it "(t)he best modern King Arthur adaptation", because it is set in the present day and "explores the power of stories" rather than "the myths themselves".

Comic Book Resources considers it "a more successful adaptation [of Arthurian mythos] than most", and posits that this is because Gillen "plays fast and loose with Arthurian legend" and acknowledges that there is no single canonical version.

== Collected editions ==
Boom! Studios has collected issues of Once & Future as trade paperbacks:

- Once & Future - Volume One: The King is Undead (ISBN 978-1684154913)
- Once & Future - Volume Two: Old English (ISBN 978-1684156375)
- Once & Future - Volume Three: The Parliament Of Magpies (ISBN 978-1684157037)
- Once & Future - Volume Four: Monarchies In The UK (ISBN 978-1684158294)
- Once & Future - Volume Five: The Wasteland (ISBN 978-1684158621)
