= Survivors' Club =

Comic

- Textless cover of Survivors' Club #1 (cover date December 2015) by Bill Sienkiewicz.

Publication information
- Publisher: Vertigo
- Schedule: Monthly
- Format: Ongoing series
- Genre: Horror
- Publication date: October 2015 – June 2016
- No. of issues: 9

Creative team
- Created by: Lauren Beukes; Dale Halvorsen; Ryan Kelly
- Written by: Lauren Beukes; Dale Halvorsen
- Artist: Ryan Kelly
- Letterer: Clem Robins
- Colourist: Eva de la Cruz
- Editor(s): Rowena Yow; Shelly Bond

Survivors' Club is a comic book series created by writers Lauren Beukes and Dale Halvorsen, and artist Ryan Kelly, published by the Vertigo imprint of DC Comics, beginning in 2015. The series is set in a world where the archetypal characters from 1980s horror movies are real. The titular "Survivors' Club" is made up of those would-be victims who managed to escape. The series ran monthly for nine issues until 2016.

== Publication history ==
The first issue of Survivors' Club was released by Vertigo Comics, an imprint of DC Comics, in October 2015. The series ran for nine issues until June 2016. The complete series was compiled as a graphic novel, which was released in September 2016.

== Characters ==
- Chenzira Moleko
- Teo Reyes
- Kiri Nomura
- Simon Wickman
- Alice Taylor-Newsome
- Harvey Lisker

== Canceled television adaptation ==
In November 2018, a television series based on Survivors' Club was in development at The CW from Warner Bros. Television. Jared Frieder and Len Goldstein were attached to the potential drama series as executive producers, with the former also set to write the pilot script. The longline for the project read:

"In a world where horror franchise monsters are real, twins Jason and Jennifer barely survived a demonic childhood possession that claimed their mother's life and fractured their bond. Ten years later, when a new evil force awakens, the siblings join forces with other teen survivors to combat the literal and metaphorical monsters that haunt them".

The script was not picked up to pilot by The CW for the 2019–2020 television season and no further development updates have been announced.
