= Kieron Gillen =

British journalist and comics writer (born 1975)

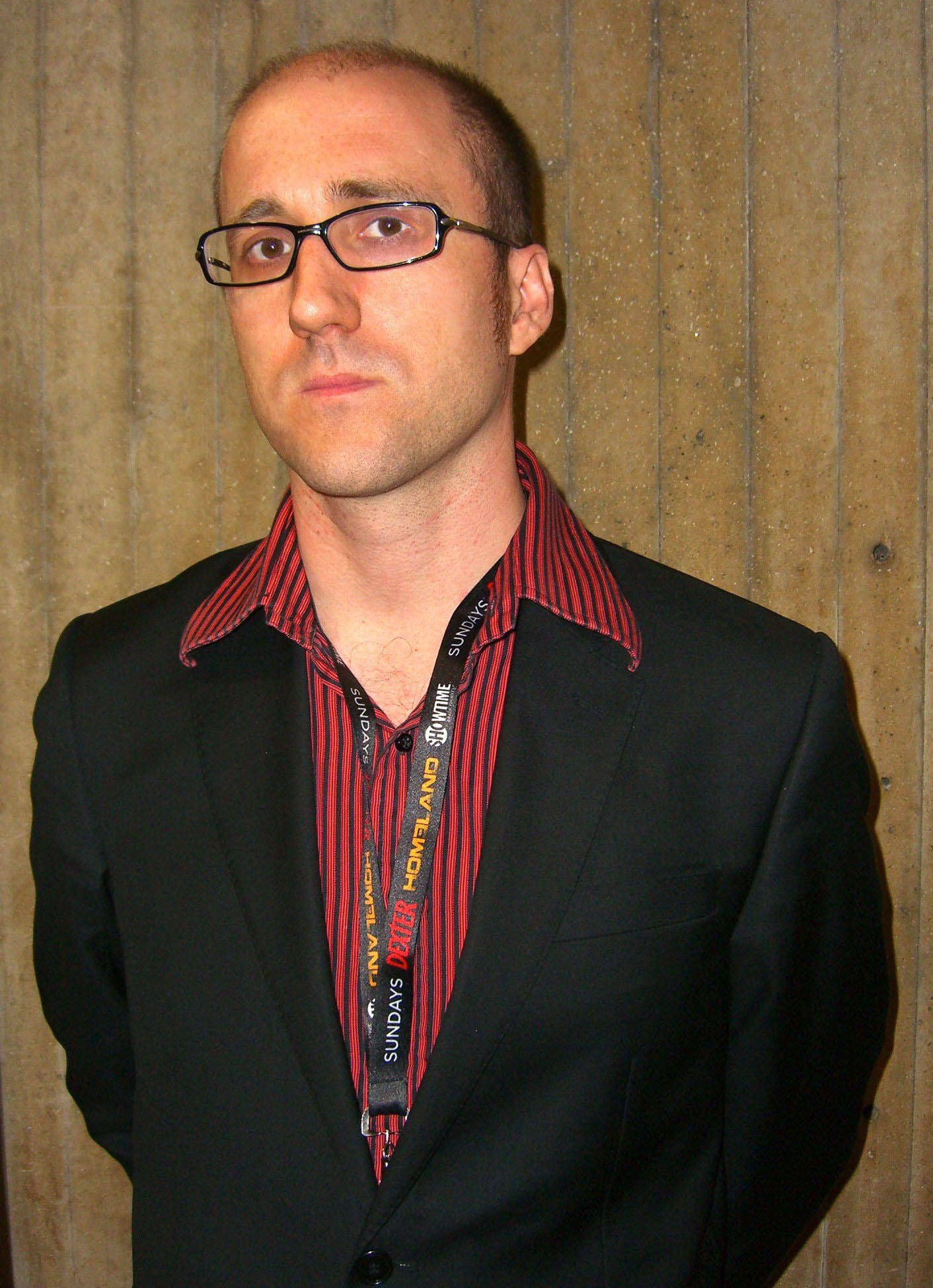
- Gillen at the 2011 New York Comic Con
- Born: Kieron Michael Gillen; 30 September 1975 (age 51)
- Area: Writer
- Notable works: Phonogram; Uncanny X-Men; Young Avengers; The Wicked + The Divine; Star Wars: Doctor Aphra
- Awards: Inkpot Award (2016)

Kieron Michael Gillen (/ˈɡɪlən/; born 30 September 1975) is a British comic book writer and former video game and music journalist. In comics, Gillen is known for his creator-owned series such as Once & Future (2019–2022), Die (2018–2021), Phonogram (2006–2016), and The Wicked + The Divine (2014–2019), the latter two co-created with artist Jamie McKelvie and published by Image. He is also known for numerous Marvel Comics projects, such as Journey into Mystery, Uncanny X-Men, and Young Avengers in the early 2010s and Star Wars comics in the mid-to-late 2010s including Darth Vader, Star Wars, and co-creation of the character Doctor Aphra who starred in her own ongoing spin-off comic series Star Wars: Doctor Aphra of which Gillen wrote the first 19 issues. He returned to the X-Men in the 2020s with multiple series during the Krakoan Age for the Destiny of X, Sins of Sinister and Fall of X storylines.

Gillen has won the British Fantasy Award twice for Die. He has been nominated for a Hugo Award nine times, once each for The Wicked + The Divine, We Called Them Giants and The Power Fantasy, three times for Once & Future, and three times for Die. He also has been nominated five times for a GLAAD Media Award, winning once for Young Avengers.

== Career ==
=== Journalism ===
As a reviewer, Gillen has written for publications such as Amiga Power (under the pseudonym "C-Monster"), PC Gamer UK, The Escapist, Wired, The Guardian, Edge, Game Developer, Develop, MCV/Develop, GamesMaster, Eurogamer and PC Format, as well as the PC gaming-oriented website Rock Paper Shotgun, In 2000, Gillen became the first-ever video game journalist to receive an award from the Periodical Publishers Association, for New Specialist Consumer Journalist. Gillen is a fan of the work of the video game developer Warren Spector, having written positive pieces on several Spector's games, most notably Deus Ex and Thief: Deadly Shadows, both produced by Ion Storm.

In addition to his work as a reviewer, Gillen has acted as a guest speaker at numerous video game industry conferences. In video game journalism, he created the New Games Journalism manifesto.

He co-founded the British video game journalism website Rock Paper Shotgun in July 2007. In a September 2010 post at Rock Paper Shotgun, Gillen announced he was leaving full-time video game journalism to devote his time to comic book writing.

=== Comics ===
==== 2003–2013 ====
Gillen's earliest work in comics was published in various British small-press anthologies and Warhammer Monthly. The Guardian highlighted that Gillen and the artist Jamie McKelvie "met in 2003 at a convention where Gillen was selling his first photocopied comics". Between 2003 and 2007, Gillen collaborated with McKelvie on a comic strip for PlayStation Official Magazine – UK, entitled "Save Point", following up with the pop music-themed urban fantasy series Phonogram, which was described by Gillen as his "first real comic". Veteran comics writer Warren Ellis dubbed the series "one of the few truly essential comics of 2006." The first issue, published by Image Comics, went on sale in August 2006, with the first series running for six issues. The sequel, a series of one-shots subtitled The Singles Club, launched in December 2008.

On 14 April 2008, it was announced Gillen would collaborate with artist Greg Scott to expand on Warren Ellis' newuniversal series with "a story about killing the future" set in 1959. That year, he authored Crown of Destruction, a Warhammer Fantasy comic. Further Marvel assignments included a Dazzler short story and a Beta Ray Bill one-shot, which was followed by a three-issue mini-series.

Gillen's workload at Marvel increased in late 2009. At HeroesCon, it was announced he would be writing a tie-in to the "Dark Reign" storyline, the mini-series Dark Avengers: Ares, and, during the 2009 Chicago Comic Con, it was announced he would collaborate with Steven Sanders on S.W.O.R.D., an X-Men spin-off series. Gillen took over Thor following a run by J. Michael Straczynski, writing issues #604 to 614.

In late 2010, Gillen launched another X-Men spin-off Generation Hope that picked up plot threads from the end of the "Second Coming" storyline. Gillen wrote the title for twelve issues before passing it to James Asmus. After co-scripting a few issues of Uncanny X-Men with outgoing writer Matt Fraction, Gillen took over the series with issue #534.1. His time on the title saw the book through the 2011 "Fear Itself" storyline, a renumbering to #1 in the wake of the "Schism" storyline, and a tie-in with the "Avengers vs. X-Men" storyline. After finishing his run with issue #20, Gillen penned a five-issue epilogue miniseries AvX: Consequences that dealt with the aftermath of that event.

In 2011, Gillen returned to Marvel's Asgard with a run on Journey into Mystery (the original name of the Thor series, continuing its original numbering), starting with issue #622 and finishing with #645 in October 2012. As part of the Marvel NOW! relaunch, Gillen wrote two books: Iron Man (again taking over from Fraction) with art by his frequent Uncanny X-Men collaborator Greg Land, and Young Avengers with Jamie McKelvie.

==== 2014–2024 ====
Between 2014 and 2019, Gillen and McKelvie collaborated on The Wicked + The Divine. This Image series won "Best Comic" at the 2014 British Comic Awards and received multiple award nominations such as the 2015 Eisner Award for "Best New Series", the 2018 Eisner Award for "Best Continuing Series" and the 2020 Hugo Award for Best Graphic Story. In 2015, the duo also returned to Phonogram after a long hiatus with the third and final volume titled The Immaterial Girl. ComicsAlliance highlighted that there was a three year delay between the volume announcement and its release "as everyone involved had rightly become superstars, but it was more than worth the wait". Gillen's other creator-owned work included Three (2013), a mini-series about the helots of Sparta, and The Ludocrats, initially announced in 2015 as a collaboration between writers Gillen and Jim Rossignol and artist David Lafuente. The series was eventually published in 2020 with art by Jeff Stokely.

From 2015 to 2016, Gillen wrote the 25-issue Star Wars: Darth Vader series for Marvel. This series introduced the character Doctor Aphra; Gillen had originally planned to have Vader kill Aphra during the story, but realized a way that she could escape and still keep the integrity of both characters. Between 2016 and 2018, he wrote Star Wars: Doctor Aphra #1–#13, and then cowrote #14–#19 with Simon Spurrier. Gillen also took over writing the Star Wars ongoing series in November 2017 with issue #38; his final issue was #67 in June 2019.

Gillen and Stephanie Hans began discussing a collaboration on a creator-owned ongoing comic following their collaboration on Journey Into Mystery. While they started with a different idea, they eventually settled on an idea which would become Die. It premiered in December 2018 and was published by Image Comics. In September 2021, the series ended its run with twenty issues total. Die won the 2021 British Fantasy Award for "Best Comic / Graphic Novel" and it was a finalist for the Hugo Award for Best Graphic Story or Comic three times. In 2018, Gillen announced that he was preparing a role-playing game based on Die. Gillen developed the game and the comic concurrently; ideas he developed for one would then crossover into the other. The hardcover edition of the DIE: The Roleplaying Game was released by British publisher Rowan, Rook and Decard in June 2023 following a successful Kickstarter campaign in May 2022 where the game was fully funded within 24 hours.

Between August 2019 and October 2022, Gillen wrote the 30-issue creator-owned series Once & Future with artist Dan Mora. This series was a finalist for the Hugo Award in "Best Graphic Story or Comic" three times. In June 2020, Marvel announced that Gillen would write the limited series Warhammer 40,000: Marneus Calgar, the first series in a line of Warhammer comics published by the company. In 2021, Gillen and McKelvie reunited with Batman: Black and White #5 for DC Comics. GamesRadar+ highlighted that they "have worked together on-and-off for the past 17 years" and that the Batman short story was their "first major project together since the conclusion of The Wicked + The Divine in 2019". Gillen commented that he started to do more "work for hire again" due to the impact of the COVID-19 pandemic – "I didn't possibly think my brain could do creator-owned work, with everything that entailed. [...] So, I was certainly open to more work for hire (amongst other projects) and I've been enjoying it".

Also in 2021, Gillen began writing the Eternals ongoing series, illustrated by Esad Ribić. This culminated in the 2022 crossover event A.X.E.: Judgment Day which focused on conflict between the Avengers, the X-Men and the Eternals. In March 2022, as part of the Destiny of X relaunch following A.X.E.: Judgment Day, Gillen began writing the Immortal X-Men series with artist Lucas Werneck which focused on the Quiet Council of Krakoa; this series built plot points for the 2023 event Sins of Sinister. The final part of Krakoan Age of the X-Men, the Fall of X, began in 2023 following Sins of Sinister. Gillen is writer on multiple series in this era such as the ongoing Immortal X-Men conclusion, the limited series Rise of the Powers of X (January 2024) with artist R.B. Silva and the limited series X-Men: Forever (March 2024) with artist Luca Maresca.

==== 2024–present ====
At Emerald City Comic Con 2024, Gillen announced a new Image series titled The Power Fantasy with artist Caspar Wijngaard and letterer Clayton Cowles; the first issue released in August 2024. It is set in an alternate history from 1945 to 1999 and focuses on six super powered people who must never come into conflict. On the creative origins, Gillen stated that "The Power Fantasy emerged in a similar way to The Wicked + The Divine. I was doing a book at Marvel, and became aware of exactly the sort of things I could do with the reins taken off. As The Wicked + the Divine was to Young Avengers, this is to Immortal X-Men". In 2025, The Power Fantasy was nominated for Best New Series at the Eisner Awards.

Gillen collaborated again with artist Hans on the original Image graphic novel We Called Them Giants which was released in October 2024. It was nominated for the "Best Graphic Story or Comic" Hugo Award in 2025. Sean Dillon of The Beat opined that the "postapocalyptic genre" of We Called Them Giants "serves Gillen better than the Alternate History of The Power Fantasy. For all his interest in history, Gillen remains a writer intensely tied to the present". Dillon viewed "the post-apocalypse" as benefiting "Gillen's skills as a writer"; he also noted that while "Gillen is an author known primarily for writing stories about young people fucking around and finding out, there remains no one better in this line of work at writing crotchety old women" as seen in the graphic novel's Beatrice. Also in 2025, Gillen and Hans returned to the Die comic with a new sequel series titled Die: Loded. The second arc began with issue #7 in July 2026.

In 2026, Gillen was announced as the lead writer for an upcoming fighting game, Marvel Tokon: Fighting Souls.

== Awards and accolades ==
Gillen was awarded an honorary Doctorate of Arts by Staffordshire University in 2019 for his work both as a journalist and a comic book writer.

Year	Award	Category	Work	Result	Ref.
2000	Periodical Publishers Association	New Specialist Consumer Journalist	—N/a	Won	
2010	Eagle Award	Favourite Newcomer Writer	—N/a	Nominated	
2014	GLAAD Media Awards	Outstanding Comic Book	Young Avengers	Won	
2014	British Comic Awards	Best Comic	The Wicked + The Divine	Won	
2015	Eisner Award	Best New Series	The Wicked + The Divine	Nominated	
2016	Inkpot Award	—N/a	—N/a	Won	
2016	GLAAD Media Awards	Outstanding Comic Book	The Wicked + The Divine	Nominated	
2018	Eisner Award	Best Continuing Series	The Wicked + The Divine	Nominated	
2019	GLAAD Media Awards	Outstanding Comic Book	Star Wars: Doctor Aphra	Nominated	
2020	GLAAD Media Awards	Outstanding Comic Book	The Wicked + The Divine	Nominated	
2020	British Fantasy Award	Best Comic / Graphic Novel	Die	Won	
2020	Hugo Award	Best Graphic Story or Comic	The Wicked + The Divine, Volume 9: "Okay"	Finalist	
2020	Hugo Award	Best Graphic Story or Comic	Die, Volume 1: Fantasy Heartbreaker	Finalist	
2021	British Fantasy Award	Best Comic / Graphic Novel	Die, Volume 2: Split the Party	Won	
2021	Hugo Award	Best Graphic Story or Comic	Die, Volume 2: Split the Party	Finalist	
2021	Hugo Award	Best Graphic Story or Comic	Once & Future, Volume 1: The King is Undead	Finalist	
2022	British Fantasy Award	Best Comic / Graphic Novel	Die, Volume 4: Bleed	Nominated	
2022	Hugo Award	Best Graphic Story or Comic	Die, Volume 4: Bleed	Finalist	
2022	Hugo Award	Best Graphic Story or Comic	Once & Future, Volume 3: The Parliament of Magpies	Finalist	
2022	Dragon Awards	Best Comic Book	Immortal X-Men	Won	
2023	GLAAD Media Awards	Outstanding Comic Book	Immortal X-Men	Nominated	
2023	Hugo Award	Best Graphic Story or Comic	Once & Future, Volume 4: Monarchies in the UK	Finalist	
2023	ENNIE Awards	Best Production Values	DIE: The Roleplaying Game Special Edition	Nominated	
2023	Origins Awards	Best Role-playing Game Core Product	DIE: The Roleplaying Game	Won	
2025	Hugo Award	Best Graphic Story or Comic	We Called Them Giants	Finalist	
2025	Eisner Award	Best New Series	The Power Fantasy	Nominated	
2026	Hugo Award	Best Graphic Story or Comic	The Power Fantasy Volume 1: The Superpowers	Pending	

== Bibliography ==
=== Early work ===
- Hit (with Brian Laframboise (#1–2), Natalie Sandells (#3), Jeff Coleman (#4) and Andy Dale (#5), webcomic, 2002–2003)
  - The first five episodes were published in print as a mini-comic compiled and distributed by Gillen himself.
  - The sixth episode (drawn by Wilson Hall) has appeared in Variance Anthology (Variance Press, 2004)
- Spectators (with Tim Twelves, short 3-page story published online via OPi8, 2002)
- Panel Bleed (e-zine co-created by Gillen and Charlie Chu, 2002–2004)
- Everybody Be Cool (column published at Ninth Art, 2002–2003)
- Webcomics created solely by Gillen and published via Big Robot:
  - Big Robots Cry Too (9-page short story, 2003)
  - Negativeland (photocomic, 2003–2004)
- Warhammer Monthly (anthology, Black Library):
  - "Herd Instinct" (with David Millgate, in #74, 2003)
  - "The Chosen" (with Steve Pugh, in #83, 2004)
- Official UK PlayStation 2 Magazine #42–89: "Save Point" (with Jamie McKelvie, half-page strip, Future Publishing, 2003–2007)
- Variance Anthology: "Something's Wrong" (with Charity Larrison, anthology graphic novel, 105 pages, Variance Press, 2004)
- Commercial Suicide (self-published anthology — co-edited by Gillen and Alex de Campi):
  - Commercial Suicide: "Minister Drill-cock!" (with Asif Khan, 2004)
  - Commercial Suicide Volume 2: "Chimplants" (with Daniel Heard, 2004)
  - Commercial Suicide Volume 3: "Ultimate Pol Pot" (with William Cogan, 2005)
- Chaos League (with Thomas Veauclin, free one-shot distributed with various gaming magazines, Digital Jesters, 2004)
- Homo Depressus (with Mark Nicoll, short 5-page story published online via Always Black, 2005)
- Busted Wonder (with Charity Larrison, webcomic, 2005–2008)
- Exterminus (with Charity Larrison, infinite canvas webcomic, 2005)
- Short stories (drawn by Andy Bloor) in anthology graphic novels published by Accent UK:
  - Zombies: "Zombies" (168 pages, 2007, ISBN 0-9555764-0-7)
  - Robots: "Robot" (204 pages, 2008, ISBN 0-9555764-1-5)
  - Western: "The Men Who Built the West" (192 pages, 2009, ISBN 0-9555764-2-3)

=== Boom! Studios ===
- Warhammer: Crown of Destruction #1–4 (with Dwayne Harris, 2008)
  - Collected as Warhammer: Crown of Destruction (tpb, 112 pages, 2008, ISBN 1-78496-466-2)
  - Collected in Warhammer: Blood of the Empire Omnibus (tpb, 400 pages, 2008, ISBN 1-934506-72-9)
- CBGB OMFUG #1: "A NYC Punk Carol" (with Marc Ellerby, anthology, 2010) collected in CBGB OMFUG (tpb, 112 pages, 2010, ISBN 1-60886-024-8)
- Fresh Romance Volume 1: "First, Last, Always" (with Christine Norrie, story created for the tpb, 224 pages, Rosy Press, 2016, ISBN 1-62010-346-X)
- Once & Future (with Dan Mora, 2019–2022) collected as:
  - The King is Undead (collects #1–6, tpb, 160 pages, 2020, ISBN 1-68415-491-X)
  - Old English (collects #7–12, tpb, 160 pages, 2020, ISBN 1-68415-637-8)
  - The Parliament of Magpies (collects #13–18, tpb, 160 pages, 2021, ISBN 1-68415-703-X)
  - Monarchies in the UK (collects #19–24, tpb, 160 pages, 2022, ISBN 1-68415-829-X)
  - The Wasteland (collects #25–30, tpb, 160 pages, 2023, ISBN 1-68415-862-1)

=== Image Comics ===
- The Complete Phonogram (hc, 504 pages, 2017, ISBN 1-5343-0151-8) collects:
  - Phonogram #1–6 (with Jamie McKelvie, 2006–2007) also collected as Phonogram: Rue Britannia (tpb, 152 pages, 2007, ISBN 1-58240-694-4)
  - Phonogram: The Singles Club #1–7 (with Jamie McKelvie, 2008–2009) also collected as Phonogram: The Singles Club (tpb, 160 pages, 2010, ISBN 1-60706-179-1)
    - Each issue featured one or more short stories (named "b-sides" by Gillen and McKelvie) which are not included in the trade paperback collection:
      - Issue #1 featured "She Who Bleeds for Your Entertainment" (art by Laurenn McCubbin) and "The Power of Love" (art by Marc Ellerby)
      - Issue #2 featured "Wuthering Heights" (art by Emma Vieceli) and "The Singer" (art by Daniel Heard)
      - Issue #3 featured "David Kohl: Phonomancer" (art by Leigh Gallagher) and "Control" (art by Lee O'Connor)
      - Issue #4 featured "The Roses" (art by David Lafuente) and "Theory and Practice" (art by Charity Larrison)
      - Issue #5 featured "Ska Attack Squad" (art by Dan Boultwood)
      - Issue #6 featured "Your Song" (art by P. J. Holden) and "Altantis to Interzone" (art by Adam Cadwell)
      - Issue #7 featured "The Queen is Dead" (art by Nikki Cook) + "Blood Mountain" (art by Becky Cloonan) + "30" (art by Andy Bloor) + "Once in a Lifetime" (art by Sean Azzopardi)
  - Phonogram: The Immaterial Girl #1–6 (with Jamie McKelvie, 2015–2016) also collected as Phonogram: The Immaterial Girl (tpb, 168 pages, 2016, ISBN 1-63215-679-2)
    - As with the previous series, each issue featured one or more short stories which are not included in the trade paperback collection:
      - Issue #1 featured "Everything and Nothing" (art by Sarah Gordon) and "Blurred" (art by Clayton Cowles)
      - Issue #2 featured "The Ice Storm" (art by Jamaica Dyer)
      - Issue #3 featured "Black Parade" (art by Christian Wildgoose)
      - Issue #4 featured "I Hate Myself" (art by Julia Scheele) and "Come Out 2nite" (art by Luis Sopelana)
      - Issue #5 featured "Shiny Black Taxi Cab" (art by Rosy Higgins)
      - Issue #6 featured "Modern Love" (art by Tom Humberstone)
- This is a Souvenir: The Songs of Spearmint & Shirley Lee: "Sweeping the Nation" (with Jamie McKelvie, anthology graphic novel, 208 pages, 2009, ISBN 1-60706-048-5)
- Liberty Annual '12: "Unleashed" (with Nate Bellegarde, anthology, 2012) collected in CBLDF Presents: Liberty (hc, 216 pages, 2014, ISBN 1-60706-937-7; tpb, 2016, ISBN 1-60706-996-2)
- Three #1–5 (with Ryan Kelly, 2013–2014) collected as Three (tpb, 146 pages, 2014, ISBN 1-60706-963-6)
- The Wicked + The Divine (with Jamie McKelvie, Kate Brown (#12), Tula Lotay (#13), Stephanie Hans (#15), Leila del Duca (#16) and Brandon Graham (#17), 2014–2019) collected as:
  - Year One (collects #1–11, hc, 400 pages, 2016, ISBN 1-63215-728-4)
  - Year Two (collects #12–22, hc, 400 pages, 2017, ISBN 1-5343-0220-4)
  - Year Three (collects #23–33, hc, 400 pages, 2018, ISBN 1-5343-0857-1)
  - Year Four (set of two hcs, 510+170 pages, 2020, ISBN 1-5343-1358-3)
    - The first volume collects #34–45 and four spin-off one-shots:
      - The Wicked + The Divine: 1831 (with Stephanie Hans, 2016)
      - The Wicked + The Divine: 455 A.D. (with André Lima Araújo, 2017)
      - The Wicked + The Divine: 1923 (with Aud Koch, 2018)
      - The Wicked + The Divine: 1373 (with Ryan Kelly, 2018)
    - The second volume collects two more spin-off one-shots:
      - The Wicked + The Divine Christmas Annual (with Kris Anka, Rachael Stott, Chynna Clugston Flores, Emma Vieceli and Carla Speed McNeil, 2017)
      - The Wicked + The Divine: The Funnies: "The Wicked + The Canine" (with Erica Henderson) and "Secret Origin" (with Jamie McKelvie, anthology, 2018)
        - Also includes a number of stories from various other creators:
          - "The Wicker + The Divine" (written and drawn by Lizz Lunney)
          - "The Lost God" (written and drawn by Chip Zdarsky)
          - "Gentle Annie vs. the World" (written by Chrissy Williams, drawn by Clayton Cowles)
          - "Making a Difference" (written by Romesh Ranganathan, drawn by Julia Madrigal)
          - "5 Things Everyone Who's Lived with Sakhmet Will Understand" (written and drawn by Hamish Steele)
          - "13 Go Mad in Wiltshire" (written and drawn by Kitty Curran and Larissa Zageris)
          - "Guilty Pleasure Song" (written by Kate Leth, drawn by Margaux Saltel)
- Where We Live: A Benefit for the Survivors in Las Vegas: "Critics" (with Jamie McKelvie, anthology graphic novel, 336 pages, 2018, ISBN 1-5343-0822-9)
- 24 Panels: "Introduction" (with Sean Azzopardi; Gillen was also the curator of this project, anthology graphic novel, 112 pages, 2018, ISBN 1-5343-1126-2)
- Die #1–20 (with Stephanie Hans, 2018–2021) collected as Die (hc, 656 pages, 2022, ISBN 1-5343-2344-9)
- The Ludocrats #1–5 (co-written by Gillen and Jim Rossignol, art by Jeff Stokely, 2020) collected as The Ludocrats (tpb, 152 pages, 2020, ISBN 1-5343-1703-1)
- Image! #7–9: "Closer" (with Steve Lieber, anthology, 2022)
- The Power Fantasy #1–ongoing (with Caspar Wijngaard, 2024–present)

=== Marvel Comics ===
- newuniversal: 1959 (with Greg Scott, one-shot, 2008)
- X-Men:
  - X-Men: Manifest Destiny #5: "Solo" (with Sara Pichelli, anthology, 2009) collected in X-Men: Manifest Destiny (hc, 200 pages, 2009, ISBN 0-7851-3818-8; tpb, 2009, ISBN 0-7851-3951-6)
  - X-Men: Origins — Sabretooth (with Dan Panosian, one-shot, 2009) collected in X-Men: Origins (hc, 192 pages, 2010, ISBN 0-7851-3451-4; tpb, 2010, ISBN 0-7851-3452-2)
  - Dark Reign: The Cabal: "The Judgment of Namor" (with Carmine Di Giandomenico, anthology one-shot, 2009) collected in Dark Avengers/Uncanny X-Men: Utopia (hc, 368 pages, 2009, ISBN 0-7851-4233-9; tpb, 2010, ISBN 0-7851-4234-7)
  - S.W.O.R.D. #1–5 (with Steven Sanders and Jamie McKelvie (co-feature in #1), 2010) collected as S.W.O.R.D.: No Time to Breathe (tpb, 128 pages, 2010, ISBN 0-7851-4076-X)
  - Generation Hope (with Salvador Espin, Jamie McKelvie (#5 and 9), Tim Seeley (#10–11) and Steven Sanders (#12), 2011) collected as:
    - The Future is a Four-Letter Word (collects #1–5, tpb, 152 pages, 2011, ISBN 0-7851-4719-5)
    - Schism (collects #6–12, tpb, 168 pages, 2012, ISBN 0-7851-5242-3)
  - Uncanny X-Men (with Greg Land, Carlos Pacheco, Terry Dodson (#535–538), Ibraim Roberson (#539), Brandon Peterson (vol. 2 #4), Dustin Weaver (vol. 2 #14), Daniel Acuña (vol. 2 #15–17), Ron Garney (vol. 2 #18) and Dale Eaglesham (vol. 2 #19), 2011–2012) collected as:
    - Uncanny X-Men by Matt Fraction: The Complete Collection Volume 3 (includes vol. 1 #531–534, tpb, 336 pages, 2013, ISBN 0-7851-8450-3)
      - Issues #531–534 are co-written by Gillen and Matt Fraction.
    - Uncanny X-Men by Kieron Gillen: The Complete Collection Volume 1 (collects vol. 1 #534.1, 535–544, vol. 2 #1–3 and S.W.O.R.D #1–5, tpb, 504 pages, 2019, ISBN 1-302-91649-1)
      - Includes the X-Men: Regenesis one-shot (written by Gillen, art by Billy Tan, 2011)
    - Uncanny X-Men by Kieron Gillen: The Complete Collection Volume 2 (collects vol. 2 #4–20, tpb, 496 pages, 2020, ISBN 1-302-92277-7)
      - Includes the 5-issue limited series AvX: Consequences (written by Gillen, art by Tom Raney (#1), Steve Kurth (#2), Scot Eaton (#3), Mark Brooks (#4) and Gabriel Hernández Walta (#5), 2012–2013)
  - Origin II #1–5 (with Adam Kubert, 2014) collected as Wolverine: Origin II (hc, 216 pages, 2014, ISBN 0-7851-8481-3; tpb, 2015, ISBN 0-7851-9032-5)
  - Immortal X-Men (with Lucas Werneck, Michele Bandini (#4–5 and 8), 2022–2023) collected as:
    - Volume 1 (collects #1–6, tpb, 184 pages, 2022, ISBN 1-302-92801-5)
    - Volume 2 (collects #7–10, tpb, 112 pages, 2023, ISBN 1-302-92802-3)
    - Volume 3 (collects #11–13, tpb, 120 pages, 2023, ISBN 1-302-95100-9)
      - Includes the X-Men: Before the Fall — Sinister Four one-shot (written by Gillen, art by Paco Medina, 2023)
    - Volume 4 (collects #14–18, tpb, 120 pages, 2024, ISBN 1-302-95342-7) [upcoming]
  - Sins of Sinister (hc, 344 pages, 2023, ISBN 1-302-95082-7) includes:
    - Sins of Sinister (with Lucas Werneck, one-shot, 2023)
    - Immoral X-Men #1–3 (with Paco Medina (#1), Andrea Di Vito (#2) and Alessandro Vitti (#3), 2023)
    - Sins of Sinister: Dominion (with Paco Medina and Lucas Werneck, one-shot, 2023)
- Beta Ray Bill: Godhunter (tpb, 104 pages, 2009, ISBN 0-7851-4232-0) collects:
  - Secret Invasion Aftermath: Beta Ray Bill — The Green of Eden (with Dan Brereton, one-shot, 2009)
  - Beta Ray Bill: Godhunter #1–3 (with Kano, 2009)
- Dark Avengers: Ares #1–3 (with Manuel García, 2009–2010) collected as Dark Avengers: Ares (tpb, 192 pages, 2010, ISBN 0-7851-4406-4)
- Ultimate Collection: Thor by Kieron Gillen (tpb, 312 pages, 2011, ISBN 0-7851-5922-3) collects:
  - Thor #604–614 (with Billy Tan, Richard Elson and Doug Braithwaite (#610, 612, 614), 2010)
  - New Mutants vol. 3 #11: "Hel's Valkyrie" (with Niko Henrichon, 2010)
  - Siege: Loki (with Jamie McKelvie, one-shot, 2010)
- The Mystic Hands of Doctor Strange: "The Cure" (with Frazer Irving, anthology one-shot, 2010) collected in Doctor Strange: The Flight of Bones (tpb, 192 pages, 2016, ISBN 1-302-90167-2)
- World War Hulks: Spider-Man vs. Thor #1–2 (with Jorge Molina and Paul Pelletier (#2), 2010) collected in Incredible Hulks: World War Hulks (hc, 448 pages, 2012, ISBN 0-7851-6215-1)
- Captain America and Batroc (with Renato Arlem, one-shot, 2011) collected in Captain America: Allies and Enemies (hc, 136 pages, 2011, ISBN 0-7851-5502-3)
- Journey into Mystery (with Doug Braithwaite, Richard Elson, Whilce Portacio (#628–629, 631), Mitch Breitweiser (#632), Carmine Di Giandomenico (#637–638, 642–644) and Stephanie Hans (#645), 2011–2012) collected as:
  - Journey into Mystery by Kieron Gillen: The Complete Collection Volume 1 (collects #622–636, tpb, 392 pages, 2014, ISBN 0-7851-8557-7)
  - Journey into Mystery by Kieron Gillen: The Complete Collection Volume 2 (collects #637–645, tpb, 456 pages, 2014, ISBN 0-7851-8574-7)
    - Includes the Exiled one-shot and New Mutants vol. 3 #42–43 (co-written by Gillen and Dan Abnett with Andy Lanning, art by Carmine Di Giandomenico, 2012) as part of the "Exiled" inter-title crossover.
    - Includes The Mighty Thor #18–21 (co-written by Gillen and Matt Fraction, art by Alan Davis and Carmine Di Giandomenico (#19–20), 2012) as part of the "Everything Burns" inter-title crossover.
- Avengers vs. X-Men (hc, 568 pages, 2012, ISBN 0-7851-6317-4) and Avengers vs. X-Men: VS (tpb, 160 pages, 2013, ISBN 0-7851-6520-7) include:
  - AvX: VS #2: "The Amazing Spider-Man vs. Colossus" (with Salvador Larocca, anthology, 2012)
  - AvX: VS #6: "Hope vs. Scarlet Witch" (with Jim Cheung, anthology, 2012)
- Young Avengers by Gillen and McKelvie (Omnibus, hc, 360 pages, 2014, ISBN 0-7851-9171-2; The Complete Collection, tpb, 360 pages, 2020, ISBN 1-302-92568-7) collects:
  - Marvel NOW! Point One: "The New World" (with Jamie McKelvie, anthology one-shot, 2012)
  - Young Avengers vol. 2 #1–15 (with Jamie McKelvie, Kate Brown (#6), Emma Vieceli + Christian Ward + Annie Wu (#14) and Becky Cloonan + Ming Doyle + Joe Quinones (#15), 2013–2014)
- Iron Man:
  - Iron Man vol. 5 (with Greg Land, Dale Eaglesham (#9–12), Carlo Pagulayan (#15–17), Joe Bennett, Agustín Padilla (#20.INH), Luke Ross (#23–26) and Cliff Richards (#27–28), 2013–2014) collected as:
    - Believe (collects #1–5, hc, 136 pages, 2013, ISBN 0-7851-6833-8; tpb, 2014, ISBN 0-7851-6665-3)
    - The Secret Origin of Tony Stark Book One (collects #6–11, hc, 136 pages, 2013, ISBN 0-7851-6834-6; tpb, 2014, ISBN 0-7851-6666-1)
    - The Secret Origin of Tony Stark Book Two (collects #12–17, hc, 136 pages, 2013, ISBN 0-7851-6835-4; tpb, 2014, ISBN 0-7851-6667-X)
    - Iron Metropolitan (collects #19–22 and 20.INH, hc, 136 pages, 2014, ISBN 0-7851-8942-4; tpb, 2015, ISBN 0-7851-8943-2)
    - Rings of the Mandarin (collects #23–28, hc, 112 pages, 2014, ISBN 0-7851-5482-5; tpb, 2015, ISBN 0-7851-8944-0)
  - Iron Man: Fatal Frontier (hc, 240 pages, 2014, ISBN 0-7851-8456-2) includes:
    - Iron Man: Fatal Frontier #1–2 and 10 (scripted by Al Ewing from a story by Gillen and Ewing, art by Lan Medina, 2013)
    - Iron Man vol. 5 Annual: "Two Cities" (with Álvaro Martínez) — "Orbital" (with Agustín Padilla) — "By Moonlight" (with Marcos Marz, 2014)
  - Original Sin #3.1–3.4: "Hulk vs. Iron Man" (co-written by Gillen and Mark Waid, art by Mark Bagley and Luke Ross, 2014)
    - Collected as Original Sin: Hulk vs. Iron Man (tpb, 104 pages, 2014, ISBN 0-7851-9156-9)
    - Collected in Original Sin Companion (hc, 968 pages, 2015, ISBN 0-7851-9212-3)
- A+X #5: "Loki + Mister Sinister" (with Joe Bennett, anthology, 2013) collected in A+X = Awesome (tpb, 144 pages, 2013, ISBN 0-7851-6674-2)
- Revolutionary War: Dark Angel (with Dietrich Smith, one-shot, 2014) collected in Revolutionary War (tpb, 184 pages, 2014, ISBN 0-7851-9016-3)
- Angela:
  - Angela: Asgard's Assassin #1–6 (2014–2015) collected as Angela: Asgard's Assassin — Priceless (tpb, 136 pages, 2015, ISBN 0-7851-9356-1)
    - The main story is written by Gillen and drawn by Phil Jimenez; the substory is co-written by Gillen with Marguerite Bennett and drawn by Stephanie Hans.
  - Secret Wars: 1602 — Witch Hunter Angela #1–4 (2015) collected as Secret Wars — Warzones: 1602 — Witch Hunter Angela (tpb, 128 pages, 2016, ISBN 0-7851-9860-1)
    - Gillen and Marguerite Bennett co-wrote the short segments in each issue — drawn by Marguerite Sauvage (#1), Irene Koh (#2), Frazer Irving (#3) and Kody Chamberlain (#4)
- Secret Wars: Siege #1–4 (with Filipe Andrade, 2015) collected as Secret Wars — Battleworld: Siege (tpb, 144 pages, 2016, ISBN 0-7851-9549-1)
- Star Wars:
  - Star Wars: Darth Vader (with Salvador Larroca, Mike Norton (co-feature in #20) and Max Fiumara (co-feature in #25); issues #14–15 are co-written by Gillen and Jason Aaron, 2015–2016) collected as:
    - Volume 1 (collects #1–12, hc, 296 pages, 2016, ISBN 1-302-90195-8)
    - Volume 2 (collects #13–25 and Annual #1, hc, 440 pages, 2017, ISBN 1-302-90220-2)
      - Includes the Star Wars: Vader Down one-shot and Star Wars vol. 4 #13–14 (co-written by Gillen and Jason Aaron, art by Mike Deodato, Jr., 2016) as part of the "Vader Down" inter-title crossover.
    - Omnibus (collects #1–25, Annual #1, Star Wars vol. 4 #13–14 and the Star Wars: Vader Down one-shot, hc, 736 pages, 2017, ISBN 1-302-90821-9)
  - Star Wars vol. 4 Annual #1 (with Angel Unzueta, 2016) collected in Star Wars Volume 2 (hc, 288 pages, 2017, ISBN 1-302-90374-8)
  - Star Wars: Doctor Aphra (with Kev Walker, Andrea Broccardo (#7–8) and Emilio Laiso; issues #14–19 are co-written by Gillen and Simon Spurrier, 2016–2018) collected as:
    - Aphra (collects #1–6, tpb, 2017, 144 pages, ISBN 1-302-90677-1)
    - Star Wars: The Screaming Citadel (includes #7–8, tpb, 152 pages, 2016, ISBN 0-7851-9789-3)
      - Also collects the Star Wars: The Screaming Citadel one-shot (co-written by Gillen and Jason Aaron, art by Marco Checchetto, 2017)
    - Doctor Aphra and the Enormous Profit (collects #9–13 and Annual #1, tpb, 168 pages, 2017, ISBN 1-302-90763-8)
    - Remastered (collects #14–19, tpb, 136 pages, 2018, ISBN 1-302-91152-X)
    - Omnibus (includes #1–19, Annual #1 and the Star Wars: The Screaming Citadel one-shot, hc, 1,240 pages, 2021, ISBN 1-302-92843-0)
  - Star Wars vol. 4 (with Salvador Larroca, Giuseppe Camuncoli (#50), Andrea Broccardo (#56, 61–62) and Angel Unzueta, 2018–2019) collected as:
    - The Ashes of Jedha (collects #38–43, tpb, 2018, 136 pages, ISBN 1-302-91052-3)
    - Mutiny at Mon Cala (collects #44–49, tpb, 2018, 144 pages, ISBN 1-302-91053-1)
    - Hope Dies (collects #50–55, tpb, 2019, 120 pages, ISBN 1-302-91054-X)
    - The Escape (collects #55–61, tpb, 136 pages, 2019, ISBN 1-302-91449-9)
    - The Scourging of Shu-Torun (collects #62–67, tpb, 144 pages, 2019, ISBN 1-302-91450-2)
- Thanos vol. 2 Annual #1: "Exhibition" (with André Lima Araújo, co-feature, 2018)
  - Collected in Thanos by Donny Cates (hc, 312 pages, 2019, ISBN 1-302-91803-6)
  - Collected in Cosmic Ghost Rider Omnibus (hc, 848 pages, 2021, ISBN 1-302-92963-1)
- Marvel Comics #1000: "The Journey" (with Doug Braithwaite, anthology, 2019) collected in Marvel Comics 1000 (hc, 144 pages, 2020, ISBN 1-302-92137-1)
- Warhammer 40,000: Marneus Calgar #1–5 (with Jacen Burrows, 2020–2021) collected as Warhammer 40,000: Marneus Calgar (tpb, 128 pages, 2021, ISBN 1-302-92478-8)
- Eternals:
  - Eternals vol. 5 (with Esad Ribić and Guiu Vilanova (#9 and 11), 2021–2022) collected as:
    - Only Death is Eternal (collects #1–6, tpb, 160 pages, 2021, ISBN 1-302-92547-4)
    - Hail Thanos (collects #7–12, tpb, 152 pages, 2022, ISBN 1-302-92548-2)
  - Eternals: A History Written in Blood (tpb, 112 pages, 2023, ISBN 1-302-95080-0) collects:
    - Eternals: Thanos Rises (with Dustin Weaver, one-shot, 2021)
    - Eternals: Celestia (with Kei Zama, one-shot, 2021)
    - Eternals: The Heretic (with Ryan Bodenheim and Edgar Salazar, one-shot, 2022)
- Marvel's Voices: Pride: "Colossus" (with Jen Hickman, anthology one-shot, 2021) collected in Marvel's Voices: Pride (tpb, 184 pages, 2022, ISBN 1-302-93369-8)
- Avengers/X-Men/Eternals: Judgment Day:
  - A.X.E.: Judgment Day (tpb, 240 pages, 2023, ISBN 1-302-94792-3) collects:
    - Free Comic Book Day 2022: Avengers/X-Men: "Of Deviation and Mutation" (with Dustin Weaver, co-feature in one-shot, 2022)
    - A.X.E.: Judgment Day #1–6 (with Valerio Schiti and Ivan Fiorelli (#6), 2022)
    - A.X.E.: Judgment Day — Avengers (with Federico Vicentini, one-shot, 2022)
    - A.X.E.: Judgment Day — X-Men (with Francesco Mobili, one-shot, 2022)
    - A.X.E.: Judgment Day — Eternals (with Pasqual Ferry, one-shot, 2022)
  - A.X.E.: Judgment Day Companion (tpb, 224 pages, 2023, ISBN 1-302-94700-1) includes:
    - A.X.E.: Judgment Day: Eve of Judgment (with Pasqual Ferry, one-shot, 2022)
    - A.X.E.: Judgment Day — Death to the Mutants #1–3 (with Guiu Vilanova, 2022)
    - A.X.E.: Judgment Day — Starfox (with Daniele di Nicuolo, one-shot, 2022)
    - A.X.E.: Judgment Day Omega (with Guiu Vilanova, one-shot, 2023)

=== Avatar Press ===
- Über:
  - Über (with Canaan White, Gabriel Andrade (#12–14) and Daniel Gete, 2013–2015) collected as:
    - Volume 1 (collects #0–5, tpb, 176 pages, 2014, ISBN 1-59291-218-4)
    - Volume 2 (collects #6–11, tpb, 160 pages, 2014, ISBN 1-59291-237-0)
    - Volume 3 (collects #12–17, tpb, 160 pages, 2015, ISBN 1-59291-251-6)
    - Volume 4 (collects #18–22, tpb, 160 pages, 2015, ISBN 1-59291-257-5)
      - Includes the Über Special (written by Gillen, art by Gabriel Andrade and Daniel Gete, 2014)
    - Volume 5 (collects #23–27 and Über FCBD 2014, tpb, 160 pages, 2015, ISBN 1-59291-268-0)
  - Über: Sieglinde (with Gabriel Andrade, one-shot, 2014)
  - Über: Invasion #1–17 (with Daniel Gete, 2016–2018)
    - In 2018, the series went on an indefinite hiatus before the release of the last four issues.
    - Issues #1–7 are collected as Über Volume 6 (tpb, 176 pages, 2018, ISBN 1-59291-332-6)
- God is Dead: Book of Acts Omega: "Alastor: Hell's Executioner" (with German Nobile, anthology one-shot, 2014)
- Crossed: Badlands #75–80 (with Rafa Lopez, 2015) collected as Crossed Volume 14 (tpb, 160 pages, 2015, ISBN 1-59291-269-9)
- Mercury Heat (with Omar Francia (#1–3) and Nahuel Lopez, 2015–2017) collected as:
  - Volume 1 (collects #1–6 and the Mercury Heat: Debut one-shot, tpb, 160 pages, 2016, ISBN 1-59291-278-8)
  - Volume 2 (collects #7–12, tpb, 144 pages, 2018, ISBN 1-59291-285-0)
- Cinema Purgatorio #1–18: "Modded" (with Ignacio Calero (#1–5) and Nahuel Lopez, anthology, 2016–2019)

=== Other publishers ===
- StarCraft: Frontline Volume 2: "A Ghost Story" (with Hector Sevilla Luján, anthology graphic novel, 192 pages, Tokyopop, 2009, ISBN 1-4278-0831-7)
- IDW Publishing:
  - Love is Love (untitled one-page story, with Sarah Gordon, anthology graphic novel, 144 pages, 2016, ISBN 1-63140-939-5)
  - Femme Magnifique: "Björk" (with Annie Wu, anthology graphic novel, 240 pages, 2018, ISBN 1-68405-320-X)
- DC Comics:
  - American Vampire Anthology #2: "England's Dreaming" (with Leila del Duca, Vertigo, 2016) collected in American Vampire Omnibus Volume 2 (hc, 928 pages, DC Black Label, 2022, ISBN 1-77951-688-6)
  - Batman: Black and White vol. 3 #5: "The Riddle" (with Jamie McKelvie, anthology, 2021) collected in Batman: Black and White (hc, 312 pages, 2021, ISBN 1-77951-196-5; tpb, 2022, ISBN 1-77951-057-8)
- Dynamite:
  - James Bond: Service (with Antonio Fuso, one-shot, 2017) collected in James Bond: Case Files (hc, 152 pages, 2018, ISBN 1-5241-0678-X)
  - Peter Cannon: Thunderbolt vol. 3 #1–5 (with Caspar Wijngaard, 2019) collected as Peter Cannon: Thunderbolt (hc, 124 pages, 2020, ISBN 1-5241-1279-8)
- Pros and (Comic) Cons: "The Oral History of the Thought Bubble Dancefloor" (with Julia Scheele, anthology graphic novel, 200 pages, Dark Horse, 2019, ISBN 1-5067-1167-7)
- The Most Important Comic Book on Earth: "Melody" (script by Gillen based on the concept by Cara Delevingne, art by Sean Phillips, anthology graphic novel, 352 pages, DK, 2021, ISBN 0-7440-4282-8)

=== Game design ===
- DIE: The Roleplaying Game (2023, ISBN 978-1-913032-25-8)
- Die Scenarios Volume 1: Bizarre Love Triangles (2024)
- Die Scenarios Volume 2: Love is a Battlefield (2024) [upcoming]

Preceded by J. Michael Straczynski	Thor writer 2010	Succeeded by Matt Fraction
Preceded by Marv Wolfman	Journey into Mystery writer 2011–2012	Succeeded by Kathryn Immonen
Preceded by Matt Fraction	Uncanny X-Men writer 2011–2012	Succeeded by Brian Michael Bendis
Preceded by Matt Fraction (The Invincible Iron Man)	Iron Man writer 2013–2014	Succeeded by Tom Taylor (Superior Iron Man)
Preceded by Jason Aaron	Star Wars writer 2018–2019	Succeeded by Greg Pak
