= Three (comics) =

Graphic novel

- Cover of Three #1 and the trade paperback

Publication information
- Publisher: Image Comics
- Schedule: Monthly
- Format: Limited series
- Genre: Historical fiction
- Publication date: October 2013 - February 2014
- No. of issues: 5
- Main character(s): Klaros, Trepander, Damar

Creative team
- Written by: Kieron Gillen
- Artist(s): Ryan Kelly, Hannah Donovan
- Letterer: Clayton Cowles
- Colorist: Jordie Bellaire

Collected editions
- Three: ISBN 1607069636

Three is an American comic book miniseries created by Kieron Gillen, Ryan Kelly and Jordie Bellaire. It was published monthly by Image Comics between October 2013 and February 2014 before being released as a single volume in April 2014. It follows three Helots in ancient Sparta fleeing from an army of Spartiates.

== Publication history ==
Three has been described as an "equal and opposite response" to the view of Sparta presented by Frank Miller's 300. Gillen was inspired to create the comic when he read 300 and was enraged by its glorification of Sparta as a "free" society despite having a huge slave underclass. He initially intended to portray the Spartans as pure antagonists, as the Persians were in 300. However, while researching for the book he came to the conclusion that the Spartans also suffered under their harsh society and the requirements it placed on them, and became more interested in presenting an objective and historically accurate image of ancient Sparta. Professor Stephen Hodkinson of the University of Nottingham, a leading expert on Sparta, consulted on the book.

== Synopsis ==
The comic is set in 364 BC, seven years after the Battle of Leuctra where Sparta was defeated and humiliated by Thebes, shattering their image of military invincibility. It opens with a depiction of the Krypteia, an annual ritual where Spartiate youths murder the strongest Helots and terrorise the others to discourage rebellion.

Eurytos, one of the five annually elected Ephors, and his guards take shelter from a storm at a farm worked by Helots. For entertainment they force the Helots to drink unwatered wine and observe their drunken revels. Klaros, a seemingly weak cripple, refuses to drink until Eurytos' son Arimnestos forces him too, and immediately vomits after swallowing the wine. Arimnestos orders the other Helots to eat Klaros' vomit and rhapsodises the strength of the Spartiates, demonstrated by the 300 Spartans at Thermopylae. However Terpander, the overseer of the Helots, finds uncharacteristic courage in his drunkenness and mocks Arimnestos and the Spartans for their failure against the Thebans and the loss of Messenia. In response, Eurytos orders his men to kill the Helots.

Klaros escapes out of a window in the farmhouse and runs into the fields, demonstrating that his leg is healthy. He digs up a xiphos and considers fleeing, but returns to the farmstead. Klaros kills one of Eurytos' guards and Terpander and a woman named Damar stab the other to death with their knives. Eurytos begs for his life but Klaros kills him and Arimnestos flees in terror, suffering only a minor wound to his arm. Realising that the Spartiates will come for them, the three survivors decide to run and attempt to reach the free city of Messene.

In the city of Sparta, Kleomenes II, one of Sparta's two kings, watches an old man instruct a group of boys. The old man tells the boys a story of two dogs from the same litter, one raised as a hunting dog and the other as a pampered pet, the moral of the story being that their breeding as Spartiates is not enough to make them soldiers and must be matched by equally important training in the Agoge. Kleomenes reflects to Tyrtaios, his former erastes, that when he was a boy the story taught that training was more important than breeding, and Tyrtaios replies that following Sparta's loss of power and prestige they need the young to believe they are inherently superior. Suddenly Arimnestos runs into the city and announces that his father has been killed by Helots.

Kleomenes meets with the four living Ephors, who demand he take an army and hunt down the three Helots. The king is enraged at being asked to perform such a menial task and the Ephor's reverence of his co-king Agesilaos, who regularly broke Sparta's supposedly sacred laws and pardoned the men who surrendered at Leuctra while his father Cleombrotus I fought and died where he stood as Spartiates are expected to. The Ephors obliquely threaten Kleomenes, referencing the deposition and "suicide" of Kleomenes I, and he resentfully takes his three hundred hippeis to hunt three helots. Arimnestos leads the hippeis to the farmhouse. A Helot tracker named Alopex claims that the three headed north, but when Kleomenes threatens to execute his family if he lies, he admits they went west towards Messene. Kleomenes declares Arimnestos a "trembler" and an outcast. His men beat Arimnestos, forcibly shave half his beard and order him to return to Sparta.

The three take a moment to rest near a statue of Aphrodite. Klaros considers killing Terpander for causing their plight but spares him, deciding he cannot kill a man for feeling a moment of pride. Arimnestos returns to Sparta and is shunned by society and disowned by his mother. Enraged at the hypocrisy of those who shun him, many of whom surrendered at Leuctra, he steals an antique bronze panoply and weapons and his mother's champion team of racehorses, and decides to hunt the three himself. He hires Aristodemos, a Skiritai scout, to track the three. The three are forced to fight their way past a Spartiate patrol on the only bridge across the Eurotas. Klaros kills all four soldiers single-handedly, much to the other's amazement. Arimnestos and Aristodemos observe them from a high vantage point.

The three flee to the mountain passes into Messenia. Arimnestos and Aristodemos follow them in, but Aristodemos points out that Arimnestos will be outnumbered and the Helots could escape or even manage to sneak up and kill him in the rough terrain. He offers to lead the Helots into a trap in exchange for Arimnestos' horses. Aristodemos approaches the Helots as a friend and convinces them to enter a narrow pass, claiming it leads out of Laconia. In fact the pass is a dead end and they are trapped by Arimnestos. Klaros fights Arimnestos but is unable to harm him due to his superior equipment. Terpander hears Kleomenes' army drawing close and sacrifices himself by leaping onto Arimnestos' spear, allowing Klaros to kill him. Mortally wounded and dying, Terpander encourages the others to run, but they realise they cannot escape. Instead, Klaros takes Arimnestos' weapons and armour and guards the narrow pass.

Kleomenes sends his men to attack but Klaros is at the top of a steep hill and the pass forces the Spartiates to attack one at a time, allowing him to hold them off. Although both sides know he will inevitably lose, the Spartiates are taking heavy losses and Kleomenes orders them to withdraw. Klaros challenges Kleomenes to a duel but Tyrtaios answers as Kleomenes' champion. After a hard battle, Klaros is able to kill Tyrtaios but is exhausted. Terpander takes the armour and goes out of the cave. He tells the Spartiates that many more Helots died at Thermopylae than Spartiates, and that they are ready to avenge those who died for the freedom of others. Shaken by Tyrtaios' death, Kleomenes does not order another attack despite his soldiers' demand that they answer Trepander's insult. That night, Damar and Klaros have sex and Trepander succumbs to his wounds while standing guard.

Knowing they cannot hold out for another day, Klaros offers to kill Damar quickly but she takes the sword and retreats into the cave, prepared to fight the Spartiates when they come for her. Klaros dons the armour and exits the cave to face the Spartiates again. Kleomenes approaches him as if to fight but soldiers at the top of the pass simply drop a boulder onto Klaros to kill him. The Spartiates are horrified by such an "unspartan" tactic, but Kleomenes replies that they cannot afford to waste men trying to live up to Sparta's ideals. The Spartiates head into the cave and find Terpander and Arimnestos' bodies. As Arimnestos is unrecognisable due to Klaros stabbing him in the face, he is mistaken for the third Helot and the hippeis withdraw, not noticing Damar who is hiding in a crevice. When the soldiers march for Sparta, Damar is able to slip away and escape to Messene. Nine months later she gives birth to twin sons, who she names Klaros and Terpander. She tells her children that they are free.

In Egypt, Pharaoh Nectanebo I runs to the beach to meet Agesilaos and his Spartan mercenaries. As he runs he extolls Sparta's martial prowess. At the beach he does not find the expected army, but merely Agesilaos lying alone on the beach, staring out to sea. Agesilaos says simply "Here lies Sparta".

== Characters ==
- Klaros: The main protagonist of the story. A Helot who served in the Spartan army. He was one of 2000 of the best Helot soldiers promised their freedom, but were instead marked for death. He escaped the slaughter and hid from the Spartiates as a crippled farm laborer. His full name is Stenyklaros, the site of a Helot ambush where 300 Spartiates were killed, but also the location of a sacred grove full of freed Messenians he torched while in the army. He is killed in a cowardly surprise attack by the hippeis.
- Terpander: A loquacious Helot storyteller and former household servant to Gyrtias. He is killed by Arimnestos.
- Damar: A Helot widow whose husband was killed in the Krypteia. She survives and escapes to Messene where she gives birth to Klaros' children. An epilogue reveals that she and her family lived as free Greeks for the rest of their lives.
- Arimnestos: The main antagonist of the story and in many ways as much of a victim of Spartan society as the three. The son of Eurytos, he is cast out of society for fleeing from the three and attempts to hunt them himself. He is killed by Klaros and mistaken for the third helot in death. Named for Aeimnestus, a Spartan leader killed by Helots in an ambush at Stenyklaros.
- Aristodemos: A Skiritai scout who chose to remain in Spartan territory after his people were freed from Spartan rule. A cynical mercenary only loyal to money. Unlike the Helots he is a free man who takes pride in his status, and openly disrespects his employer Arimnestos. He is named for Aristodemus, the lone Spartan survivor of Thermopylae.
- Eurytos: One of the five Ephors, killed by Klaros. Demonstrates the arrogance typical of a Spartiate, but fails to face death with stoicism.
- Gyrtias: Eurytos' widow and mother of Arimnestos. Owner of the three. She and her husband deliberately only had a single child to prevent their estate being divided among multiple heirs rather than breed many sons for the army as Spartiate mothers are expected to do.
- Kleomenes II: Young Agiad king of Sparta. He is both aware of Sparta's decline yet also feels powerless to correct it. His experience hunting the three leads him to believe Sparta must abandon their traditional ways in order to survive. An epilogue reveals that he went on to reign for sixty years of near total peace and is forgotten by history.
- Tyrtaios: Kleomenes' mentor, former lover and second-in-command. He is killed in a duel by Klaros.
- Agesilaos II: Elderly Eurypontid king of Sparta. At the time of the book he is leading mercenary forces in Egypt. Considered one of Sparta's greatest kings he has seen it decline from the mightiest power in Greece to a mere shadow over the course of his reign. He takes pragmatic action to prolong the state's life, but also privately recognises that it can never regain its former glory. An epilogue reveals that he dies without returning to Sparta.

== Reception ==
The series consistently suffered from low sales figures through its initial run and the trade paperback sold only an estimated 1,764 units in its debut month. Despite this, critical reception was generally positive. According to the review aggregation website Comic Book Roundup, the series received an average score of 8.4/10 from critics, based on 42 reviews. Goodreads gave the trade paperback an average score of 3.77 from readers, based on 472 ratings.

The majority of reviews praised the book for its rigorous attention to historical details and Ryan Kelly's artwork, but were more mixed on the plot and characterisation. François Peneaud of The Slings & Arrows Graphic Novel Guide called it "a vivid recreation of ancient times... offering a personal interpretation of a period of history which deserves better than being reduced to a battle cry", while James Johnston of Multiversity Comics described the first issue as "more focused towards teaching the reader than it is towards entertaining... [but] still a very well written and well-drawn comic", and "a tribute to a long-forgotten people". However, Joshua Yehi of IGN stated that he did not find the main characters compelling and felt that the story depicted the Spartans as one-dimensional villains.
