= Saucer Country =

Comic book published by Vertigo

- Cover to Saucer Country #1

Publication information
- Publisher: Vertigo
- Schedule: Monthly
- Format: Ongoing series
- Genre: Sci-fi, political thriller
- Publication date: March 2012 – April 2013
- No. of issues: 14

Creative team
- Created by: Paul Cornell; Ryan Kelly
- Written by: Paul Cornell
- Artist: Ryan Kelly
- Letterer: Sal Cipriano
- Colorist: Giulia Brusco
- Editor: Will Dennis

Saucer Country is a discontinued UFO mythology comic book series written by Paul Cornell and drawn by Ryan Kelly, published by Vertigo in 2012 and 2013. The series is about a US presidential candidate, Governor Alvarado, who has come to believe she may have been abducted by aliens. The series began publication in March 2012. The series is a blend of a political environment and stories of aliens and UFOs.

Starting in May 2017, a sequel miniseries, Saucer State, began publication at IDW. Saucer State lasted for six issues, and serves as a story conclusion.

== Overview ==
The main plot of Saucer Country is about Arcadia Alvarado, the Hispanic governor of New Mexico now running for presidency. Arcadia believes that she had been abducted by aliens one night, and embarks on a mission to get to the bottom of the mystery while running for the position of President at the same time.

Describing the series on his website, Cornell wrote:

Saucer Country is a trip through UFO mythology, a subject I've always been fascinated with. It's a dark, suspenseful, serious thriller with, I hope, some warm, very human characters at the heart of it.

The series also features short stand-alone stories besides the main plot. These stories are "true stories" - accounts of people who claim to have been abducted by aliens.

== Plot ==
Arcadia Alvarado is the governor of New Mexico and is considered to be the primary Democratic candidate for the position of the President of the United States.

Arcadia is caught in the middle of a volatile political situation as she is running for presidency, handling with her duties as governor, dealing with her alcoholic ex-husband Michael.

Arcadia claims to have been "abducted by aliens" one night, but only retains glimpses of her encounter with the extraterrestrial beings and does not remember the entire story. With the help of her staff and a former Harvard professor, Professor Kidd, Arcadia tries to solve the mystery about her apparent abduction by the aliens.

== Characters ==
- Governor Arcadia Alvarado is the main character of the series. She is the governor of New Mexico and is of Mexican-American heritage. She is the one who claims to have been abducted by aliens, but is not able to fully justify it due to her not retaining the complete story. She has a determined and focused personality.
- Professor Kidd is a former Harvard professor and has a deep interest in UFO mythology, even though he carries a skeptical approach towards it. He has strange encounters with a mysterious couple who provide him with advice and instructions occasionally.
- Michael is Arcadia's ex-husband. He is addicted to alcohol and lacks the heroism Arcadia usually displays. He is present in the car the night Arcadia claims to have been abducted.

== Reception ==
The series received generally positive reviews. James Hunt of Comic Book Resources commented on the first issue, praising the talents of Cornell and Kelly, but also criticized the issue for ending too quickly. Geeks of Doom described it as "what's sure to become a beloved classic comic book series and that one day we will look back on this first issue in wonderment and think 'I can't believe all that's happened since then". Comics reviewer and writer Joey Esposito of IGN have the first issue an 8 out of a possible 10, and summarised: "Out of the gate, Saucer Country looks to be another solid entry worthy of the pedigree of Vertigo Comics". He, however, also pointed out that writer Paul Cornell focuses too much attention on Arcadia and "bizarre elements" and in doing so "ultimately subtracts from the grounded base that is established here". He also praised Ryan Kelly's art, especially his characters' body language and expressions, but criticized the colouring of the issue. The series was cancelled after 14 issues.

The first volume was nominated for the 2013 Hugo Award for Best Graphic Story, but lost to the first volume of Saga.

== Collected editions ==
- Saucer Country Vol. 1: Run (144 pages, collects Saucer Country #1–6 ISBN 978-1-4012-3549-9)
- Saucer Country Vol. 2: The Reticulan Candidate (176 pages, collects Saucer Country #7–14 ISBN 978-1-4012-4047-9)
- Saucer Country (300 pages, collects Saucer Country #1–14 ISBN 978-1-68405-095-6)
- Saucer Country: The Completed Edition (440 pages, collects Saucer Country #1-14, Saucer State #1-6, and Saucer Country: The Finale One-Shot ISBN 978-1-5343-2748-1)

== Adaptation ==
In 2026, a television adaptation was announced to be developed by Hamzah Jamjoom and Alberto Lopez.
