= A Girl and Her Fed =

Fantasy webcomic

A Girl and Her Fed is a science fiction/fantasy webcomic written by K. B. Spangler; Spangler initially did the art as well, but eventually subcontracted this to Ale Presser. It was launched in 2006.

== Premise ==
When journalist Hope Blackwell discovers that her mail is being opened, the ghost of Benjamin Franklin leads her to federal agent Patrick Mulcahy, who is secretly a cyborg with IT-based augmentations that have been driving him insane. Together, they discover a vast conspiracy that reaches throughout the United States government and beyond the grave.

== Other media ==
Spangler has written eight prose novels about the universe of A Girl and Her Fed: six about cyborg agent Rachel Peng (beginning with Digital Divide in 2013), and two about Blackwell (beginning with Greek Key in 2015). She has also written three novellas about cyborg agent Josh Glassman (beginning with The Russians Came Knocking in 2013).

== Reception ==
David Brin has stated that it was one of "the best Science Fiction Webcomics". Io9's Lauren Davis stated that the "goofiness of the [comic's] first few pages" made it difficult for her to engage with the story, but emphasized that this "initial silliness" is explained by revelations in Digital Divide.

A Girl and Her Fed was a finalist for the 2026 Hugo Award for Best Graphic Story.
