= Die (comics and role-playing game) =

Interconnected comic book and tabletop role-playing game

DIE
- Volume 1 cover.

Publication information
- Publisher: Image Comics
- Format: Ongoing series
- Genre: Dark fantasy
- Publication date: December 2018 – September 2021
- No. of issues: 20

Creative team
- Created by: Kieron Gillen and Stephanie Hans
- Written by: Kieron Gillen
- Artist: Stephanie Hans
- Letterer: Clayton Cowles

Collected editions
- Fantasy Heartbreaker: ISBN 1-5343-1270-6
- Split the Party: ISBN 1-5343-1497-0
- The Great Game: ISBN 1-5343-1716-3
- Bleed: ISBN 1-5343-1926-3

Die (stylized as DIE) is both a horror/fantasy comic book about role-playing games, and an interconnected tabletop role-playing game system. The comic book and role-playing game were developed simultaneously, with content from one crossing into the other, and vice versa. Both the comic book and the role-playing game were written by Kieron Gillen and illustrated by Stephanie Hans. Die was influenced by the portal fantasy and LitRPG literary genres.

The comic book series focuses on a group of British adults who are drawn back to an icosahedron-shaped world they originally visited as teenagers; the group left behind a friend upon their original escape and never discussed the experience. It was published by Image Comics and ran for twenty issues across four five-issue arcs (Fantasy Heartbreaker, Split the Party, The Great Game, and Bleed), beginning in December 2018 and ending in September 2021. The comic won the British Fantasy Award for "Best Comic / Graphic Novel" in 2020 and 2021 and was a finalist for the Hugo Award for Best Graphic Story or Comic three times.

Gillen and Hans created the role-playing game complement to the comic book with British publisher Rowan, Rook and Decard. The game was funded via Kickstarter in May 2022. The digital edition was released in November 2022 with the hardcover edition following in June 2023. The game won "Best Role-playing Game Core Product" at the 2023 Origins Awards.

A sequel, titled Die: Loaded, began in November 2025.

== Creative origins ==
Gillen has stated that the idea for Die came from a conversation with his longtime collaborator Jamie McKelvie about the Dungeons & Dragons cartoon, in which a group of children are magically transported to the fantasy world of the tabletop role-playing game Dungeons & Dragons. The final episode of the show, in which the characters return to Earth, was never produced, and Gillen wondered what might have happened to the children. Additionally, Gillen was inspired by Stephen King's horror novel It, and particularly the theme of adults returning to childhood experiences of horror. Die's focus on role-playing games and game mechanics was born from Gillen's own interest in role-playing games. He has stated that while he played RPGs for most of his life, his interest was reignited in 2013, when he started to seriously consider "the nature of fantasy, and where this weird form actually came from." These ideas became core themes in Die.

Gillen collaborated with artist Hans during his run on Journey into Mystery, after which they began discussing a collaboration on an ongoing comic. Hans had primarily worked as a cover artist, and Die was her first ongoing comic. Gillen developed the role-playing game and the comic concurrently. Ideas developed for one then crossed over into the other. For example, the secret of the Fallen originated in the game. He stated:

I actually tend to think of the comic and the game as two lenses of examining DIE. [...] It's also telling that when developing the game and writing the comic, ideas bounced between them freely. It was never me trying to adapt one to another, really. I was trying to do the idea as well as I could in two separate forms.

== Comic book synopsis ==
=== Volume One: Fantasy Heartbreaker ===
Title	Issue #	Release date
The Party	1	December 5, 2018
In 1991, Dominic Ash spends his 16th birthday playing a tabletop role-playing game with his younger sister Angela and friends Solomon “Sol”, Isabelle, Matt, and Chuck. Sol created the game for Ash and plays as the gamemaster. When the group rolls their dice for the first time, they disappear. Two years later, Ash, Angela, Isabelle, Matt, and Chuck reappear, refusing to speak about where they went or what happened to Sol. Twenty-five years later, Ash receives Sol's original 20-sided die from the night of the game and reconvenes the party to discuss what to do with it. The die activates and all five are transported to the fantasy world of Die, where Ash takes the form of a woman. Before the party can enact the ritual to return to Earth, Sol appears, refusing to let them leave.
Players	2	January 9, 2019
25 years ago, the party fought and defeated the Grandmaster, the ruler of Die. The Grandmaster revived and captured Sol just as the return ritual completed, trapping him while the rest of the party returned to Earth. Sol killed the Grandmaster and took his place. Sol insists that the party 'play' and leaves. Since the return ritual requires the players to unanimously agree to go home, they must find Sol and convince him to leave as well. The party decides to hike across the dangerous Front instead of the more civilized areas they explored as teenagers, rationalizing that they “can survive anything but our past”.
Dungeons	3	February 6, 2019
The party is attacked by a mechanical dragon while travelling through the Front, and Ash shelters in a trench with a unit of English soldiers. One of the soldiers asks Ash to get a message to his family before dying. A man who appears to be J. R. R. Tolkien arrives, identifying himself as the unwilling ‘Master’ of the Front. He sends the soldier's message via a giant eagle. Matt manages to kill the dragon. The party decides to head to Glass Town to recover. The eagle is shot down and the soldier's message burned. The Front is based on the World War I European front and trench warfare, and the war experiences of J. R. R. Tolkien.
The Inn	4	March 6, 2019
The party arrives at Glass Town, where they are hailed as heroes called the Paragons. The Paragons learn that the way to Sol's realm involves a lengthy dungeon crawl, and decide to get Sol to come to them instead by destroying Glass Town. Glass Town is based on the paracosm of the same name created by the Brontë siblings as children.
Premise Rejection	5	April 3, 2019
The Paragons destroy Glass Town using the robot forces of Eternal Prussia. The Paragons manage to incapacitate Sol, but he refuses to let them leave, telling Ash that he made Die "all for you". Ash, seeing no alternative, kills him. Isabelle and Chuck refuse to do the return ritual. Sol revives as a Fallen, revealing that all Fallen are real people who died in Die who can properly resurrect if they kill players. The remaining Paragons realize that, to make the party unanimous to enact the return ritual, they need to kill Isabelle and Chuck. Eternal Prussia is based on wargames and the history of the genre, particularly Kriegsspiel and its effect on the Franco-Prussian War.

=== Volume Two: Split the Party ===
Title	Issue #	Release date
The Grind	6	August 7, 2019
Ash, Isabelle, Angela, and Sol are trapped in Glass Town, which is now occupied by Eternal Prussia. Ash interrogates Sol on how he created Die. The party escapes Glass Town and head to Angria to meet with allies from their past. They are greeted by Augustus, Ash's son from their original visit to Die.
Wisdom Check	7	September 4, 2019
Isabelle, Chuck, and the Glass Town refugees were teleported to a desert on the other side of Die. Isabelle and Chuck argue and Isabelle sets Mistress Woe on Chuck to teach him a lesson. The company is joined by the Elf Queen of the Dreaming Lands. Mistress Woe allows a Titan to sneak up on the company. Isabelle apologizes to Chuck, who kills the Titan and then has sex with the Elf Queen. They discuss wisdom and how it relates to Chuck's hedonistic attitude towards life. The next morning, the company is joined by Lord Zamorna, the deposed vampire ruler of Angria and Isabelle's former lover.
Legacy Heroes	8	October 2, 2019
Ash, Angela, Matt, and Sol have taken up residence in Verdopolis, the capital of Angria. Matt and Ash discuss Augustus, who is Ash's son by Zamorna. Matt wins a battle with the Knightly Orders in exchange for their support of the Paragons against the Angrian Ruling Party. Angela finds out that Eternal Prussia is building a forge in Glass Town, though she can't tell what it's making. The Ruling Party agrees to help find Isabelle and Chuck, but are interrupted by Isabelle who confesses that the Paragons orchestrated the destruction of Glass Town.
Self-Insert	9	November 6, 2019
The Paragons (except Chuck) are jailed in response to Isabelle's confession. Isabelle realizes the jail warden is Charlotte Brontë, who explains her past. The Brontë siblings created a fantasy world, and Charlotte and Branwell called their section Angria. Angria, Gondol, Glass Town, and characters such as Zamorna were all creations of the Brontë siblings that now exist in Die. Charlotte found a way to directly manipulate Angria. As adults, however, the worlds of Gondal and Angria began to bleed into reality. Charlotte decided that Angria was gaining too much power and needed to be destroyed. Branwell refused and was consumed by his own imagination, soon followed by Emily, Anne, and finally Charlotte. When she died, she awoke in Die as the Master of Angria. Zamorna arrives as part of Isabelle's plan to take over Angria to set up a united front against Eternal Prussia. He frees Ash and Isabelle, who convinces Ash to work with her for the sake of her son.
The X-Card	10	December 4, 2019
Ash, Isabelle, and Zamorna execute their plan to take over Angria. Since Ash can only do one compulsion at a time on an unwilling subject, she convinces other Dictators to join her; however, she has to kill an enslaved Dictator who tries to stop her. She frees Augustus and enchants Zamorna to keep him under control while giving her the political power to take over Angria. Chuck breaks Angela and Matt out of prison, revealing that he is dying and needs to find a healer; they leave a content Sol behind. Ash is crowned Queen of Angria upon marrying Zamorna. Isabelle begins to question Ash's nature and intentions as Ash takes the throne.

=== Volume Three: The Great Game ===
Title	Issue #	Release date
Risk	11	June 24, 2020
Chuck, Angela, and Matt escape Verdopolis. In Verdopolis, Ash and Sol reconcile. Sol offers Ash one of his d20 eyes, which would give her unimaginable power, reminding her again that “It's all for you.” Ash and Isabelle plan to reconvene with the others and leave Die once they have fixed the problems they created. They receive warning that Angria is about to be invaded by the realm of Little England. While hunting Fallen, Angela finds a Fallen that appears to be her daughter Molly.
Hidden Role	12	July 22, 2020
The Fallen Molly appears to be a few years older, raising concerns that time is passing faster on Earth. Angela resolves to take Molly with her to find a way to save her. They learn that Sol carved the Brontë siblings' twelve toy soldiers from childhood, which presents a timeline inconsistency. Angela decides to go to the Fair to look for answers. Back in Angria, Ash sends Zamorna and Augustus to fight Little England. Ash determines that she needs to talk to the Master of Little England, who is revealed to be H. G. Wells.
Little Wars	13	September 2, 2020
H. G. Wells reflects on his research into Kriegsspiel and its creators' mysterious deaths. He wrote Little Wars to counter the negative effects of wargames but woke up in Die, where he learned that stories and games were absorbed by a controlling intelligence, with their creators becoming "Masters" on the gameboard. Wells sends Invisible Men after Ash, who counters by revealing that the Great War still happened, and Little Wars only led to more wargames, more TTRPGs, and the cataclysmic event of 1991. Distraught, Wells plans to travel back in time to stop Die, while Isabelle saves Ash, who forms an alliance to fight Eternal Prussia. Meanwhile, Chuck, Angela, Matt, and Molly meet with the Fair. They explain their mission to prevent a 2020 cataclysm, where Die and Earth merge. The Fair unintentionally opened time paths, which Die is using to ensure its existence, influencing creators such as Tolkien, the Brontës, and Wells. The forge in Glass Town is creating dice that will finalize the merge. The party heads to Glass Town to stop the dice’s forging and prevent the catastrophe.
Dual Wield	14	October 7, 2020
Zamorna and Augustus lead Angrian forces to distract Eternal Prussia so that Little England can destroy the forge in Glass Town. Augustus is hurt in a barrage and is sent back to Verdopolis. Mistress Woe calls in all her debts on Isabelle to have her deliver a message. Meanwhile, Angela, Matt, and Chuck arrive in Glass Town and begin hacking the forge. Matt receives Isabelle's message: on Earth, his father has died. Matt teleports back to Angria, planning to kill Isabelle and Ash.
PvP	15	November 18, 2020
Matt arrives and fights Isabelle—when Augustus tries to help her, Ash uses a compulsion to stop him. This frees Zamorna from his compulsion and he heads to Angria to kill Ash. Ash decides to take the Grandmaster's die from Sol. However, Augustus realizes that the Grandmaster's die is a fake and that Sol was never really in control of anything. Ash convinces Matt to spare her and he kills Zamorna. Back in Glass Town, Angela can't bring herself to kill Molly in order to finish hacking the forge. The forge finishes the dice and they begin plowing underground. Sol gains sudden knowledge that once the dice reach the center of Die they will head back to 1991, closing the cycle, but the Paragons can stop them if they outrace the dice.

=== Volume Four: Bleed ===
Title	Issue #	Release date
Thaco	16	May 5, 2021
The Paragons head to an endless sea to find a way to the center of Die. Matt has taken over as leader while Ash and an increasingly unstable Sol are chained together. The Paragons land on a mysterious island. The Paragons take a shortcut to the bottom of the sea in a submarine. They believe that the realm they are in is based on the works of Jules Verne—however, upon entering the tunnels, they instead meet the Master of the realm, an eyeless H. P. Lovecraft. The title of the issue refers to THAC0, an acronym for ‘To Hit Armor Class 0’, a roll system used in Advanced Dungeons & Dragons 2nd Edition which was later discontinued.
Total Party Kill	17	June 9, 2021
Lovecraft explains his history in Die: he had dreams about cults who revered him as well as strange shapes that represented “the amoral god at the end of time”. Isabelle and Angela figure out that the shapes he saw are their dice and that he had futuristic premonitions about these ‘cults’ playing the Call of Cthulhu role playing game. Lovecraft shows the Paragons a cavern of dreams from dreamers on Earth—when someone dies in the dream, an echo of that person arrives in Die as a Fallen. Lovecraft believes that there is no averting fate, as the merge of Die and Earth has both already happened and not happened yet. The Dreamer calls in her debts on Isabelle to have her kill Lovecraft. A tentacled monster emerges from the lake and attacks the party. Sol again remembers being here, realizes the tentacled monster and this dungeon is not Lovecraftian but his own reference to the Watcher in the Water, and helps them escape.
Lines & Veils	18	July 14, 2021
During the original return ritual as teenagers, Ash paused for just a moment when it was her turn. She believes that if she had not paused, the Grandmaster would not have had time to grab Sol and none of this would have happened, and thus blames herself. The Paragons travel through a dungeon similar to the Mines of Moria. They find Sol's logbook from his first visit to the dungeon; it reveals that the Grandmaster killed Sol shortly after capturing him, making him into the first Fallen. Sol traveled to the island and down into the mine, but something killed him. The Grandmaster revealed himself to be the living personification of Die. Sol, seeking revenge against his friends for leaving him, accepted Die's deal that allowed Sol to play at Grandmaster in exchange for preparing the way for the Die-Earth merge. Something begins banging on the door and Sol remembers what killed him the first time in the mines—a giant, monstrous representation of Ash.
Boss Fight	19	August 25, 2021
The monster Ash reveals she is a dark representation of all of Ash's repressed feelings, desires, and impulses. She will allow the Paragons to leave, but only if Ash merges with her to wreak havoc on Earth. The monster almost kills Matt, but Isabelle saves him at the cost of being able to talk to the gods. Isabelle opens up to Ash, leading Ash to explain how Die allowed her to explore her queer identity and make choices without repercussions. Ash tricks the monster and throws both of them off the bridge. Ash survived her fall: she merged with the monster, accepting all parts of herself, including her dark impulses, while acknowledging her responsibility in controlling them. The Paragons find the dying Fair, who teamed up with Wells to try to stop Die a final time but failed. The living representation of Die, now fully merged with the dice, approaches the Paragons and asks “What am I for?”
Open Table	20	September 29, 2021
In 1991, Sol receives the dice for their game. In 2020, Die refuses to answer the Paragons unless addressed by a living Sol. Chuck apologizes to his friends and dies at Sol's hands. Sol resurrects and demands answers. Die reveals it orchestrated events, from H.G. Wells creating wargames to Tolkien's Lord of the Rings to modern TTRPGs, leading to Sol's game in 1991. Die, amoral and desiring only to exist, caused harm without understanding its impact. Matt realizes Die's purpose was to teach and help them grow, while Ash understands Die's true question: what do they, as players, want from it? Ash answers that Die is for self-discovery, imagination, and beauty. Die thanks them and disintegrates into their dice. Sol sends the dice to 1991; the Paragons return to Earth during the COVID-19 pandemic. The Paragons face personal growth: Matt realizes he is stronger than his depression, Angela reunites with her family, Isabelle gains inspiration, Sol reunites with his mother, Ash embraces his identity and becomes a father. In the end, Ash addresses the reader, explaining that Die’s purpose is to help people become who they want to be, teaching lessons that can shape their future. "It's all for you."

== Comic book characters ==
Paragons

- Dominic Ash: In the real world, Ash is a middle-aged man working in marketing. He is married to a woman named Sophie. He was best friends with Sol before they were transported to Die. In the world of Die, Ash lives as a woman. She plays the game as a Dictator, a diplomat character archetype represented by a 4-sided die. She has the ability to manipulate people's emotions and convince them to do her bidding with her words. During her time in Die as a teenager, Ash had numerous relationships with men, including an affair with Isabelle's lover Zamorna that resulted in an unexpected pregnancy.
- Angela Ash: Ash's younger sister. In the real world, Angela is a coder who develops video games. She has two children and is in the process of divorcing her husband after having an affair with her co-worker Susan. In the world of Die, Angela plays as a Neo, a cyberpunk-inspired character archetype represented by a 10-sided die. She can gain control of machines and teleport herself, and she is able to manifest a robotic version of her childhood dog that acts as her companion. Her abilities are all powered by Fair gold, resulting in a dependence on the substance that is akin to addiction. As a teenager, she traded one of her arms for a cybernetic limb, which resulted in her losing an arm when she returned to the real world.
- Isabelle: A Vietnamese-French adoptee who dated Sol when they were teenagers. She had a contentious relationship with Ash, made worse by the affair that Ash had with Zamorna. As an adult, Isabelle is divorced and teaches English literature at a high school. In the world of Die, she plays as a Godbinder, a character archetype represented by a 12-sided die. She is able to demand favors from twelve gods, each representing different elements and ideas, though she must perform favors for them in return. She strongly believes that the party should treat everyone in Die as if they are real and take responsibility for the consequences of their actions.
- Matt : Matt is a statistics professor with two daughters. His mother died when he was a teenager, leading to struggles with grief and depression. In the world of Die, he plays as a Grief Knight, a variant of an emotion-based character archetype represented by an 8-sided die. He carries a talking sword that verbalizes his worst fears and insecurities and becomes more powerful as he becomes sadder. Of all the members of the party, he is the most invested in leaving Die and returning home to his family. In Issue 14, Matt takes up a talking mace that symbolizes anger and becomes a dual-wielder of both Grief and Anger.
- Chuck: After leaving Die for the first time, Chuck became rich and famous writing popular fantasy novels. He has been married three times and is estranged from his children. In the world of Die, he plays as a Fool, a character archetype represented by a 6-sided die. As long as he maintains a carefree attitude and doesn't seriously consider consequences, he is granted an unusual degree of luck in all his actions. His recklessness and insincerity regularly antagonize the other members of the party.
- Solomon: Sol was Ash's best friend, and designed the game that led the party to Die as a gift for Ash. In the world of Die, he initially played as a Master, a character archetype equivalent to a gamemaster and represented by a 20-sided die. When the party made their first attempt to leave Die, an unexpected disruption resulted in Sol being left behind. He ended up becoming the Grandmaster of Die, ruthlessly controlling the rules governing all the realms instead of just one. Ash kills him after it becomes clear that he won't let the party return home, and he is resurrected as an undead Fallen. Fallen Sol is kept prisoner by Ash, who regularly interrogates him to try to uncover the true origins of Die.

Citizens of Die

- Zamorna: The deposed vampire ruler of Angria, now in exile in Gondol. He was formerly the lover of both Isabelle and Ash, and fathered Augustus with Ash. Ash enchants him when they take over Angria to keep him under control. Zamorna is one of the characters created by the Brontë siblings as part of their fantasy worlds.
- Augustus: The son of Zamorna and Ash and godchild of Isabelle and the Mourner. When Ash realized she was pregnant with him, she was afraid of the implications of his existence and what would happen to her and her baby if they returned to Earth, leading Isabelle to ask the Mourner to carry him to term so that the Paragons could leave without strings.
- Delighted & Dour: Two dwarves who can only feel the emotion they were named for. They befriend the party in Glass Town and join them throughout their adventures. Dour is killed in issue 15 protecting Chuck, and Delighted leads the Paragons to their final destiny.
- Molly: Angela's eldest daughter, who reacted badly when Angela's affair with a coworker was revealed and her parents began divorce proceedings. Molly appears in Die as a Fallen, leading to concerns that time is passing faster on Earth and that more people are being pulled into Die and subsequently dying. In Die: Loaded, Molly is non-binary and has a strained relationship with their mother.
- The Elf Queen of the Dreaming Lands: An elven woman who initially appears to the party as an undead Fallen, and then later in her true form to Isabelle and Chuck. She is based on a former classmate of the Paragons when they were in school. Chuck sleeps with her real form but she leaves when Chuck says she isn't real and just a plaything, on top of not knowing her name. In the final issue, she gives a mission to the Fallen Chuck, who accepts on the condition that she tells him her name.
- The Master of the Front: A man who appears to be J. R. R. Tolkien and who is now the unwilling Master of 'The Front', who believes that the Realm is a perversion of his stories. Unlike the other Masters, this echo does not directly claim to be the man who inspired him.
- Charlotte Brontë: The Warden and Master of Angria, who claims to be the real Charlotte Brontë who was transported to Die upon her death. Charlotte and her siblings created the worlds of Gondal, Angria, Glass Town, and characters such as Zamorna in their childhood, but soon realized that they had gotten more than they bargained for when their worlds began to bleed into reality.
- H. G. Wells: The Master of Little England, who reveals that he and the other Masters are merely 'echoes' of real-world creators who created pieces for Die. Wells is more involved in his realm than the other Masters, and believes that he successfully saved the world already by writing the book Little Wars. When Ash tells him that this didn't prevent World War I, Wells leaves in a time machine to try to stop it. He teams up with the Fair in a final attempt to stop Die and presumably dies during the attack.
- H. P. Lovecraft: The Master of the Realm of Thirteen, an endless sea with an island and sub-dungeon based on Lovecraftian horror. He carved out his eyes after viewing the horrors of Die. This echo recalls that he once dreamed of non-Euclidean shapes and cults who revered his name, which are revealed to be futuristic premonitions of TTRPG dice and people playing the role-playing game based on his works, Call of Cthulhu. Isabelle kills him once he shows the Paragons the truth of the Fallen.
- The Fair: Android-like fae creatures who act as Angela's patrons and provide her her Neo abilities. They are described as elves if elves were designed by William Gibson. They choose whether to provide boons or not based on a coin-flip marked with binary. The Fair reveal that they arrived in Die in 1990 to try to stop Die's plan to merge with Earth in 2020, and are killed in their final attempt after teaming up with H. G. Wells.

== Comic book publication history ==
=== Original series ===
In September 2018, it was announced that the Die ongoing series by Gillen and Hans would be published by Image Comics. The series launched its first story arc in December 2018. In January 2019, the first issue received a third print run and the second issue received a second print run. Ultimately, the first issue received five print runs in total; every issue in the arc received additional print runs. In August 2019, the second story arc began with issue #6; per Diamond Comic Distributors, that issue was ranked #95 for "Total Unit Sales" for comic issues that month.

The release of third story arc was delayed due to the COVID-19 pandemic; it began with issue #11 released in June 2020. In February 2021, Gillen and Hans announced that the fourth story arc, titled Bleed, would be the final arc. The final arc began with issue #16 in May 2021 and finished with issue #20 in September 2021.

When asked if the intention of series was to run for twenty issues, Gillen stated:

We've got the numbers on the d20 on the back. So, it was sort of implied that we weren't going past 20. 20 issues and four movements was always the plan. The first arc is the travel to try to get to Sol. [...] Then in the second arc, the party is split. We follow their separate paths before we end with them coming together and Ash taking over Angria becoming the quote-unquote evil queen. Then in the third arc, we have a high-level war between the various regions of Angria. So we've gone from one party to two parties working at separate ends to a Lord of the Rings-scale world war. Then the fourth arc was always going to be we're going down a fucking dungeon. It's obviously a joke because we're doing a Dungeons & Dragons-esque comic, and we haven't gone down a dungeon yet.

A hardcover collection of the twenty issues was released in November 2022.

=== Die: Loaded ===
In August 2025, Gillen announced an upcoming sequel titled Die: Loaded which is set one year later; the first issue was released on November 12, 2025. Hans returns as the illustrator. Gillen explained that Die: Loaded is both a sequel and an accessible new series for people who have never read the original series – "if it says #1 on the front and someone can't just grab and read it, something's gone amiss. We tell everything you need to know". The second arc began with issue #7 released on July 8, 2026.

== Role-playing game ==
DIE RPG
- Designers: Kieron Gillen and Stephanie Hans
- Illustrators: Stephanie Hans (lead illustrator), Tula Lotay, Abz Harding, Marguerite Sauvage, Elsa Charretier and Gene Ha
- Writers: Kieron Gillen (lead writer), Adrian Tchaikovsky, Becky Annison, Cat Evans, Emily Allen, Tini Howard, and Sasha Sienn
- Publishers: Rowan, Rook, and Decard
- Publication: 2022
- Genres: Tabletop role-playing game, fantasy, horror
- Website: https://rowanrookanddecard.com/product/die-the-roleplaying-game

In 2018, Gillen announced that he was preparing DIE RPG, a role-playing game intertwined with the Die comic book. The player characters are teenagers who magically enter the fictional universe of a tabletop role-playing game. The game's narrative style is metatextual. Gillen stated that his influences for DIE RPG included the games Paranoia, Monsterhearts, Dungeon World, Legacy, Fiasco, Warhammer, and Dungeons & Dragons, as well as elements of Nordic LARP.

=== Gameplay ===
Each character type is called a Paragon. The gamemaster also plays a character: the gamemaster within the fiction. Paragons have special dice that grant them unique moves. Each character has six main statistics. The randomization system uses dice pools.

=== Publication history ===
The original public beta version of the game was released for free online in June 2019 with the release of the trade paperback Die, Vol. 1: Fantasy Heartbreaker. Gillen also ran a closed beta to further develop the game. Gillen highlighted that his early playtesting began before the publication of the comic and that reading the comic is not required for playing the game as it is not "like a traditional licenced [sic] RPG book".

When compared to the art of the comic series, Hans stated that the RPG art would be "a bit more full of detail and thoughts. My traditional painting style is not that far from digital art. [...] So, I don’t think it will be that different, but in the composition, of course, there will be some mock-up involved" and that "there are inspirations from the comics that I want to use for the RPG".

DIE: The Roleplaying Game was scheduled to launch on Kickstarter in October 2021, however, British publisher Rowan, Rook and Decard later announced a delay due to concerns around shipping and material shortages. The official Kickstarter for the game launched on May 12, 2022; it was fully funded within 24 hours. DIE: The Roleplaying Game includes two main rulesets – DIE Core, rules for games two to four sessions long, and DIE Campaign, rules for longer ongoing games. DIE Core is an updated version of the public beta game. The digital edition was released to Kickstarter backers on October 25, 2022. The PDF became widely available on November 29, 2022 with the hardcover edition following in June 2023. The first expansion, Die Scenarios Volume 1: Bizarre Love Triangles, was released on May 15, 2024. The second expansion, Die Scenarios Volume 2: Love is a Battlefield, was released in September 2024. The third expansion, Die Scenarios Volume 3: Childish Things, was released in April 2025.

An entry level boxed set, titled DIE RPG Quickstart, which features a new scenario by Gillen released in May 2025. The first issue of Die: Loaded (November 2025) included new quickstart rules as well the new adventure "The Dreams We Had as Children".

== Reception ==
=== Comic book ===
In The Comics Journal, Mark Sable ranked the first issue as among the best comics of 2018, describing it as "the most memorable and accessible debut issue (he had) read in a long time". In 2019, Io9 called Die "subversive" and "a heady combination of fascinating worldbuilding (and) compellingly broken characters tearing each other apart", lauding Hans' "vivid, striking artwork".

At the review aggregator website Comic Book Roundup, which assigns a weighted mean rating out of 10 to reviews from comics critics, the entire series received an average score of 9.4 based on 202 reviews. Chase Magnett, for ComicBook.com in 2021, wrote that "the arrival of DIE #20 is a bittersweet moment. Over the past 3 years, DIE established itself as one of the most engaging and wondrously conceived series in serialized American comics. Each issue read like a gift and engaged all of the facets that made this concept sing: richly-considered characters, fascinating settings and conflicts, a rigorous consideration of humanity's use of games and stories, and some of the most stunning artwork found in any comic from 2021. [...] So whether you're finally coming to DIE as it concludes or, like many of us here at ComicBook, tensely awaiting one last issue, there has never been a better time to discover one of the absolute best comics series in years".

Christian Holub, in his 2021 review of Die, Vol. 4: Bleed for Entertainment Weekly, commented that "it's always nice to see a creative team stick the landing. [...] The conclusion is fulfilling and satisfactory, so it feels like we can now confirm Die as a very good comic, one of the best mainstream offerings in years. Hans' painterly art makes Die look uniquely distinguished from every other fantasy series on the shelf, and proves more than capable of tackling the many, many different kinds of stories Gillen brings into their orbit. [...] Anyone who found themselves intrigued by Die's initial premise owes it to themselves to read all four volumes".

In terms of sales, both the individual issues and the trade paperbacks were consistently bestsellers. Bleeding Cool highlighted that "while it's unusual for monthly titles to increase in sales following #1", from the third issue every initial order for each issue in the first arc was higher than the previous issue and "Die #6 has the highest initial orders for an issue of Die since #1". Die, Vol. 1: Fantasy Heartbreaker was #1 in "units shipped" and #9 in "dollars invoiced" on Diamond's "Best-Selling Graphic Novels" sales list for June 2019. Die, Vol. 2: Split The Party was #2 in "units shipped" and #6 in "dollars invoiced" on Diamond's "Best-Selling Graphic Novels" sales list for February 2020. Die, Vol. 3: The Great Game was #4 in "units shipped" and #6 in "dollars invoiced" on Diamond's "Best-Selling Graphic Novels" sales list for December 2020. Die, Vol. 4: Bleed was #4 in "units shipped" and #11 in "dollars invoiced" on Diamond's "Best-Selling Graphic Novels" sales list for November 2021. In January 2022, all four trade paperbacks were on Diamond's "Top 400 Comic Books" for graphic novel sales – volume one was #121, volume four was #208, volume two was #263 and volume three was #323.

=== Role-playing game ===
DIE: The Roleplaying Game was included on Gizmodo's "The 20 Best Tabletop Roleplaying Games of 2022" list — Linda Codega commented that it is "probably the game that I am most hyped to receive in physical form" and that the game "is a meta-textual love letter to gaming, storytelling, and their own comic creation. [...] It combines a very clever premise with the ability to do pretty much anything you want, but the consequences, the final decision, always looms large in the minds of you and your companions". Chris Lowry for Tabletop Gaming called DIE RPG a "Must Play." He wrote, "So, what makes this a Must Play? I found DIE RPG to be a mirror; reflecting back the breadth of a genre and my own experiences within it. It is a love letter to classic RPGs whilst containing some of the newest and most interesting ideas I’ve ever seen, ideas that are both an innovation in mechanics and deeply clothed in self-referential theme".

=== Awards ===
Year	Award	Category	Work	Result	Ref.
2020	British Fantasy Award	Best Comic / Graphic Novel	Die	Won	
2020	Hugo Award	Best Graphic Story or Comic	Die Vol. 1: Fantasy Heartbreaker	Nominated	
2021	British Fantasy Award	Best Comic / Graphic Novel	Die Vol. 2: Split the Party	Won	
2021	Hugo Award	Best Graphic Story or Comic	Die Vol. 2: Split the Party	Nominated	
2022	British Fantasy Award	Best Comic / Graphic Novel	Die Vol. 4: Bleed	Nominated	
2022	Hugo Award	Best Graphic Story or Comic	Die Vol. 4: Bleed	Nominated	
2023	ENNIE Awards	Best Production Values	DIE: The Roleplaying Game Special Edition	Nominated	
2023	Origins Awards	Best Role-playing Game Core Product	DIE: The Roleplaying Game	Won	
2024	RPG Magnifico First Edition Award at PLAY Modena		DIE: The Roleplaying Game	Won	

== Collected editions ==
Title	Material collected	Format	Publication date	Pages	ISBN	Ref
Die Vol. 1: Fantasy Heartbreaker	Die #1–5	Trade paperback	June 5, 2019	184	ISBN 978-1-5343-1270-8	
Die Vol. 2: Split The Party	Die #6–10	Trade paperback	February 5, 2020	168	ISBN 9781534314979	
Die Vol. 3: The Great Game	Die #11–15	Trade paperback	December 16, 2020	168	ISBN 9781534317161	
Die Vol. 4: Bleed	Die #16–20	Trade paperback	November 3, 2021	160	ISBN 9781534319264	
Die	Die #1–20	Hardcover	November 22, 2022	656	ISBN 978-1534323445	
