= Stephanie Hans =

French illustrator and comics artist

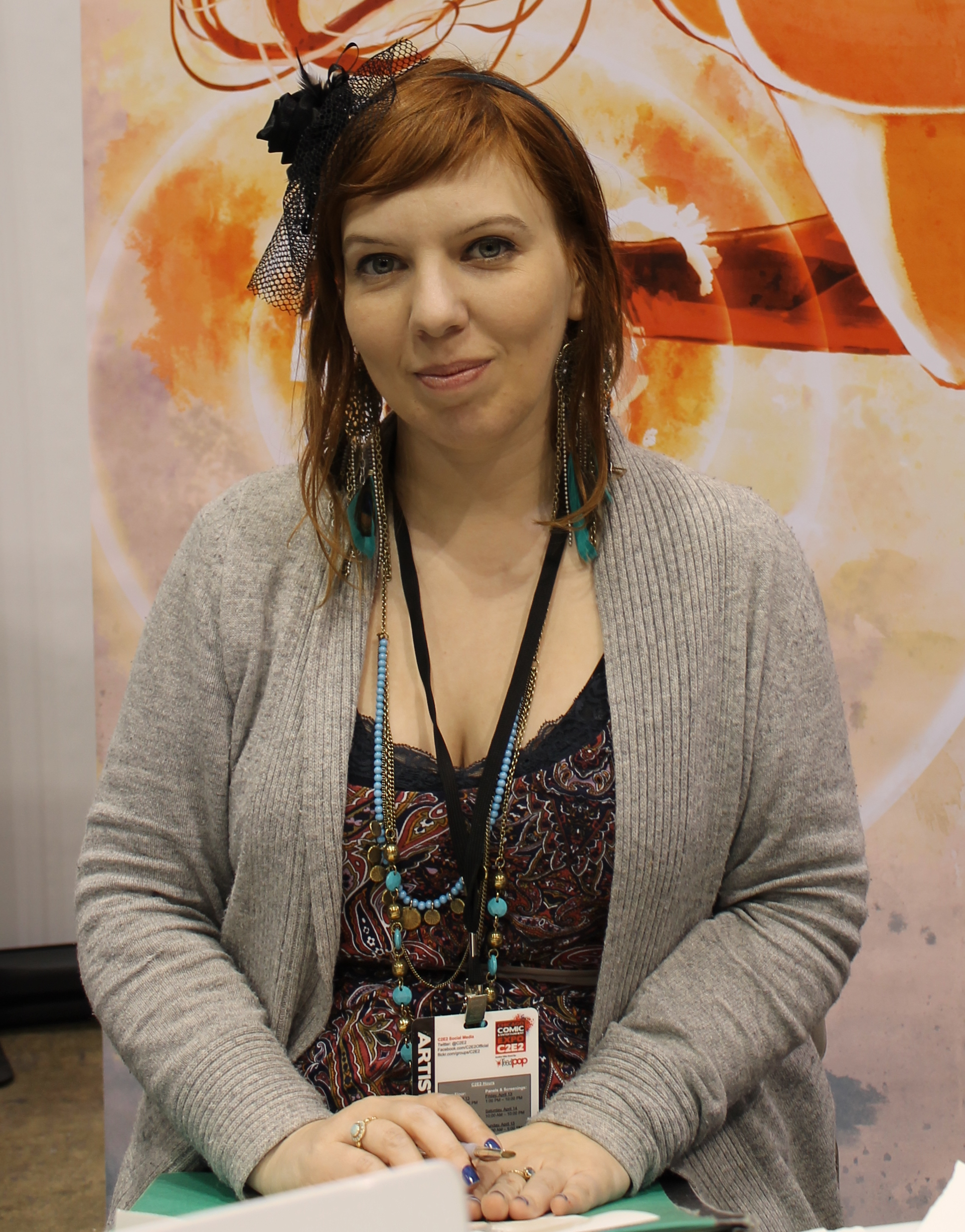
- Hans at the 2012 Chicago Comic & Entertainment Expo
- Notable works: Die; Journey into Mystery; Angela: Asgard's Assassin; Angela: Queen of Hel; Dark Agnes; Black Bolt; Lucifer; Batwoman

Stephanie Hans is a French illustrator and comics artist. She is best known for co-creating the series Die, a three-time Hugo Award-finalist, and British Fantasy Award winner, with writer Kieron Gillen. Hans has worked with Marvel Comics, DC Comics, and Image Comics as an artist and series creator.

== Career ==
=== Cover art ===
Hans originally started with cover art for French prose literature. Hans attributes her cover for Firestar #1 in 2010 as the work that allowed her to break into the comics market. Hans' art has since appeared in a variety of mainstream US comics titles, often as a cover artist, including Captain America: Steve Rogers, Ant-Man and the Wasp Prelude, and Dark Agnes with Marvel Comics, and Lucifer and Batwoman with DC Comics. Hans has also worked with comic book publishers Dark Horse, Valiant, Dynamite, Vertigo, and Boom Studios. In 2014, Hans created the poster for the American television series Agents of S.H.I.E.L.D.'s episode "Nothing Personal".

Hans did several covers for Journey into Mystery (2011) during writer Kieron Gillen's run and did the interior illustration for his final issue on the run. CBR highlighted the cover of Journey Into Mystery #625 and stated "the composition and figure work on this cover is absolutely stunning, but everything is second to Hans choice of colors. Those monochromatic greens, so layered and full of light and life, contrasted with the bright pink petals is absolute perfection. The only thing wrong with this cover is that hideous extra large title". The cover of Journey Into Mystery #638 was on ComicsAlliance's "Best Comic Book Covers Ever (This Month) – May 2012" list — "I've only noticed Stephanie Hans's work recently with her covers for Journey Into Mystery. This cover is one part of a frieze for the current JIM/New Mutants crossover Exiled. Impressively, the pieces are all good covers in their own right, but this one is the best, and all of them make me excited for what Hans might do next".

In 2015, CBR reported that "during the past five years, the artist has quickly become a fan and critic favorite for her distinctive approach to covers". Her art has been listed on Paste's "The Best Comic Book Covers of the Month" list several times: Thor #4 (March 2015), Steve Rogers Captain America #7 (November 2016), Die #1 (December 2018), Die #2 (January 2019) and Die #3 Second Printing (March 2019).

=== Comic interior art ===
Hans was the co-artist for Marvel's limited series Angela: Asgard's Assassin #1-6 (2014) with Phil Jimenez; the series was written by Kieron Gillen and Marguerite Bennett. Russ Burlingame, for ComicBook.com in 2014, commented of the series creative team it was Kieron Gillen, Marguerite Bennett and Phil Jiminez who "got a lot of the attention. Stephanie Hans, a fairly young artist who is billed as doing backup stories in the book, didn't get quite as much notice, but she's done some beautiful work on Asgard in the past and is a favorite of both of the writers". Jesse Schedeen, in IGN's review of the first issue, wrote that "Phil Jimenez handles art duties on the main story, while Stephanie Hans tackles the interlude segment. Of the two, Hans stands out more thanks to the ethereal watercolor approach that goes hand in hand with the storybook quality". Petra Halbur, in her review of the series for The Mary Sue, wrote "Phil Jimenez and Stephanie Hans' artwork is breathtaking. The character designs are interesting and varied, the action sequences are beautifully realized and the use of color is just, like… the best".

Hans continued to be a co-artist on comic series for Marvel which focused on Angela — first, Secret Wars 1602: Witch Hunter Angela #1-4 (2015) with writers Bennett and Gillen and rotating co-artists followed by Angela: Queen of Hel #1-7 (2016) with co-artist Kim Jacinto and writer Bennett. Paste, on 1602: Witch Hunter Angela #1, highlighted that "skilled digital painter Stephanie Hans steps up from short flashbacks to take lead art reins in this mini-series, with Bennett's upcoming Bombshells collaborator Marguerite Sauvage stepping into the first of several rotating guest spots".

In addition to doing several alternate covers for the series, Hans also did the illustration for The Wicked + The Divine #15 with writer Gillen. This story arc had rotating guest artists; IGN commented that while "the previous artists were at least in the same wheelhouse as McKelvie, Stephanie Hans morphs the book into something else wholly new. Reading this issue you can't help but imagine what the entire series would've looked like under her hand – it's that good. She illustrates in a style perfectly suited to this series, it's grand, sweeping, and operatic". In 2018, Hans was the co-artist for Black Bolt #10 with artist Christian Ward and writer Saladin Ahmed.

==== Collaboration with Kieron Gillen ====
Following their collaboration on Journey Into Mystery, writer Kieron Gillen and Hans began discussing a collaboration on an ongoing comic. While they started with a different idea, they eventually settled on an idea which would become Die. The series was Hans first ongoing series. It premiered in December 2018 and was published by Image Comics. The horror/fantasy comic book focuses on a group of middle-aged adults who are drawn back to an icosahedron-shaped world they originally visited as teenage role-players; the group left behind a friend upon their original escape and never discussed the experience. In September 2021, the series ended its run with twenty issues total. Hans also illustrated DIE: The Roleplaying Game, an adaptation of the comic series, which was developed by Gillen and British publisher Rowan, Rook and Deckard. Following delays, the official Kickstarter for the adaptation launched on May 12, 2022. When compared to the art of the comic series, Hans stated that the RPG art "will be a bit more full of detail and thoughts. My traditional painting style is not that far from digital art. [...] So, I don't think it will be that different, but in the composition, of course, there will be some mock-up involved" and that "there are inspirations from the comics that I want to use for the RPG".

Die won the 2021 British Fantasy Award for "Best Comic / Graphic Novel" and it was a finalist for the Hugo Award for Best Graphic Story or Comic three times. The roleplaying game won "Best Role-playing Game Core Product" at the 2023 Origins Awards. Praising Hans' art in co-creating the series, Gizmodo reporter James Whitbrook said, "Hans is equally comfortable at depicting a grimy teen's bedroom circa 1991 as she is a steampunk battlefield inspired by the bloodshed of World War One, or a towering, magical city of ancient spires." Christian Holub, in his 2021 review of Die, Vol. 4: Bleed for Entertainment Weekly, commented that "it's always nice to see a creative team stick the landing. [...] The conclusion is fulfilling and satisfactory, so it feels like we can now confirm Die as a very good comic, one of the best mainstream offerings in years. Hans' painterly art makes Die look uniquely distinguished from every other fantasy series on the shelf, and proves more than capable of tackling the many, many different kinds of stories Gillen brings into their orbit".

Following their collaboration on Die (2018 – 2021), Hans worked again with Gillen on the original Image graphic novel We Called Them Giants which was released in October 2024. It was nominated for the "Best Graphic Story or Comic" Hugo Award in 2025. Sean Dillon of The Beat called Hans the "main draw" of We Called Them Giants as she is "one of the great comics artists of the modern era, whose water painted style feels right at home in this decaying natural landscape".

== Awards and nominations ==
Year	Award	Category	Work	Result	Ref.
2020	Hugo Award	Best Graphic Story or Comic	Die, Volume 1: Fantasy Heartbreaker	Finalist	
2020	Dragon Awards	Best Graphic Novel	Black Bolt	Nominated	
2021	British Fantasy Award	Best Comic / Graphic Novel	DIE	Won	
2021	Hugo Award	Best Graphic Story or Comic	DIE, Volume 2: Split the Party	Finalist	
2022	Hugo Award	Best Graphic Story or Comic	DIE, Volume 4: Bleed	Finalist	
2023	ENNIE Awards	Best Production Values	DIE: The Roleplaying Game Special Edition	Nominated	
2023	Origins Awards	Best Role-playing Game Core Product	DIE: The Roleplaying Game	Won	
2025	Hugo Award	Best Graphic Story or Comic	We Called Them Giants	Finalist	

== Personal life ==
Hans is a graduate of École supérieure des arts décoratifs de Strasbourg. On her education, Hans stated, "I was a very bad student. It was a long time ago and digital painting was very new, and definitely not taught there. I learnt a lot through the conceptart.org website later. I also have a thing for classical painters and illustrators. It shapes my style".
