= Ryan Kelly (comics) =

American comic book artist (born 1976)

- Born: January 29, 1976 (age 50) Saint Paul, Minnesota, United States
- Area: Artist
- Notable works: Lucifer; Local
- Spouse: Kat Vapid
- Children: 3

Ryan Kelly (born January 29, 1976) is an American comic book artist, known for his work on books such as Lucifer and Local.

== Career ==
In 1998, Kelly graduated from the Minneapolis College of Art and Design where he studied under comic book artist Peter Gross. He began illustrating for magazines and newspapers before obtaining commissions for comic book illustration. He worked with Gross on the DC Comics series Lucifer and The Books of Magic, both under the Vertigo imprint. From 2000 to 2007, he was part of the MCAD staff, teaching classes on Comic Book creation and illustration.

In 2004, he illustrated the political satire Giant Robot Warriors. He illustrated the entire twelve issue run of the Oni Press comics series Local, written by Brian Wood, a story arc ("The Cross + the Hammer") for Wood's Northlanders, and the DC/Vertigo ongoing series Saucer Country by Paul Cornell. In 2020, he pencilled the Stranger Things tie-in comic miniseries Stranger Things: Into the Fire published by Dark Horse Comics. In addition to his comics art work he has had various Minneapolis area exhibitions of his painted work. He has produced illustrations for Time Magazine and Rolling Stone.

== Bibliography ==
=== DC Vertigo ===
- Books of Magic #57, 62, 68, 70 (pencils (57, 62, 68) and inks (70), with Bronwyn Carlton, 1999–2000)
- Lucifer #5-75 (inks, with Mike Carey, 2000–2006)
- American Virgin #18-19, 22 (pencils, with Steven T. Seagle, 2006 & 2008)
- The New York Four (with Brian Wood, 2007)
- The Vinyl Underground #7-12 "Pretty Dead Things" (2008)
- The New York Five #1-5 (2011)
- Northlanders #11-16 "The Cross + The Hammer" (with Brian Wood, 2008–2009)
- DMZ #42-44 "No Future" (with Brian Wood, 2009)
- Saucer Country (with Paul Cornell, 2012-2013)
- Dead Boy Detectives #7-11 "Ghost Snow" (with Toby Litt, 2014)
- Survivors' Club (with Lauren Beukes and Dale Halvorsen, 2015–2016)
- Unfollow #10 (with Rob Williams, 2016)
- Red Thorn #12 (with David Baillie, 2016)

=== Marvel Comics ===
- Marvel Boy #6 (with Grant Morrison, 2001)
- Original Sin: Secret Avengers (with Ales Kot, Infinite Comics, 2014)
- Marvel Snapshots: Civil War #1 (with Saladin Ahmed, 2020)

=== AiT/PlanetLar ===
- Giant Robot Warriors (with Stuart Moore, 2004)

=== Oni Press ===
- Local (with Brian Wood, 2005–2008)

=== Image Comics ===
- Comic Book Tattoo "Winter" (with John Ney Rieber, 2008)
- Three #2, 4, 5 (with Kieron Gillen, 2013-2014)
- Cry Havoc #1-6 (with Si Spurrier, 2016)
- The Wicked + The Divine 1373 (one-shot) (with Kieron Gillen, 2018)
- Scrapper #3-6 (2023)

=== Poseur Ink ===
- Side B: The Music Lover's Comic Anthology #108-114 "Torso" (with Kat Vapid, 2009)

=== Self-Published ===
- Funrama (2010-2020)

=== Dark Horse ===
- Star Wars #7-9 (with Brian Wood, 2013)
- Stranger Things: Into the Fire #1-4 (with Jody Houser and Le Beau Underwood, Dark Horse, 2020)
- Assassin's Apprentice (with Jody Houser and Jordie Bellaire,2022-2023)
- Assassin's Apprentice II (with Jody Houser and Robin Hobb,2022-2023)
