= Legacy (role-playing game) =

Tabletop role-playing game

Legacy is a role-playing game published by Legacy Press in 1978.

== Description ==
Legacy is a universal system intended to simulate any genre or historical period, but with only enough information to enable play in prehistoric societies. A complex and very specific system of skill definitions requires the GM to create statistics for higher level civilizations. The game includes character creation, combat, and skill rules, and a large section covering how to run the game.

== Publication history ==
Legacy was designed by David A. Feldt, and published by Legacy Press in 1978 as a 160-page book with 48 cardstock sheets and a transparent overlay.

== Reception ==
Steve Lortz reviewed Legacy for Different Worlds magazine and stated that "This game may not be of much use to a person who simply wants to slaughter monsters and rake up loot, but I recommend it highly to people who are interested in role-playing hard science fiction or using role-play as a medium for naturalistic simulation."

Lawrence Schick comments on the system for creating statistics for civilizations: "All in all, it's really pretty useless."
