= LeMan (magazine) =

Turkish satirical magazine

- Categories: Satirical magazine
- Frequency: Weekly, biweekly
- Publisher: Bahadır Baruter, Betül Yılmaz, Cem Yılmaz, Nihat Genç, and Ramize Erer
- Founder: Mehmet Çağçağ and Tuncay Akgün
- Founded: 21 November 1991
- Final issue: 26 June 2025
- Company: LeMan group magazines
- Country: Turkey
- Based in: Istanbul
- Language: Turkish
- Website: http://www.leman.com.tr/

LeMan is a Turkish satirical magazine known for its bold political and social commentary. Founded in 1991 by Mehmet Çağçağ and Tuncay Akgün, the magazine has become a significant voice in Turkish media, often addressing controversial topics through humour, cartoons, comics, and satirical articles. Its roots trace back to Limon, a publication established in 1985 by former contributors to the influential satirical magazine Gırgır. LeMan is published weekly, though it announced in 2024 that it would shift to biweekly publication due to rising paper costs.

== History ==
LeMan is one of Turkey's long tradition of satirical magazines. Since it was founded by the same team after the closure of Limon magazine in 1991, which was founded by a team that left Gırgır in 1985, its beginning can be considered as 1985. While Gırgır and all similar satirical magazines (including Limon) were owned by a large media organization, LeMan magazine was founded as an independent magazine by Mehmet Çağçağ and Tuncay Akgün. His work set a standard for satirical magazines like Penguen, Uykusuz, and Cafcaf that came after LeMan established.

The magazine strengthened and popularized its leftist oppositional stance from Limon with writers and illustrators such as Nihat Genç, Ender Özkahraman, Cezmi Ersöz and political and cultural figures such as Can Yücel, Eşber Yağmurdereli, and continued to be the best-selling and most popular humour magazine for a long time. It turned into a publishing group by publishing many other humor and non-humor magazines from its own publishing house. In the 2000s, it was weakened by large-scale ruptures in its staff and lost its influence and circulation. The departing teams founded alternative satirical magazines such as Penguen and Lombak. Despite its weakening, it published its 1000th issue in 2010.

== LeMan Kültür ==
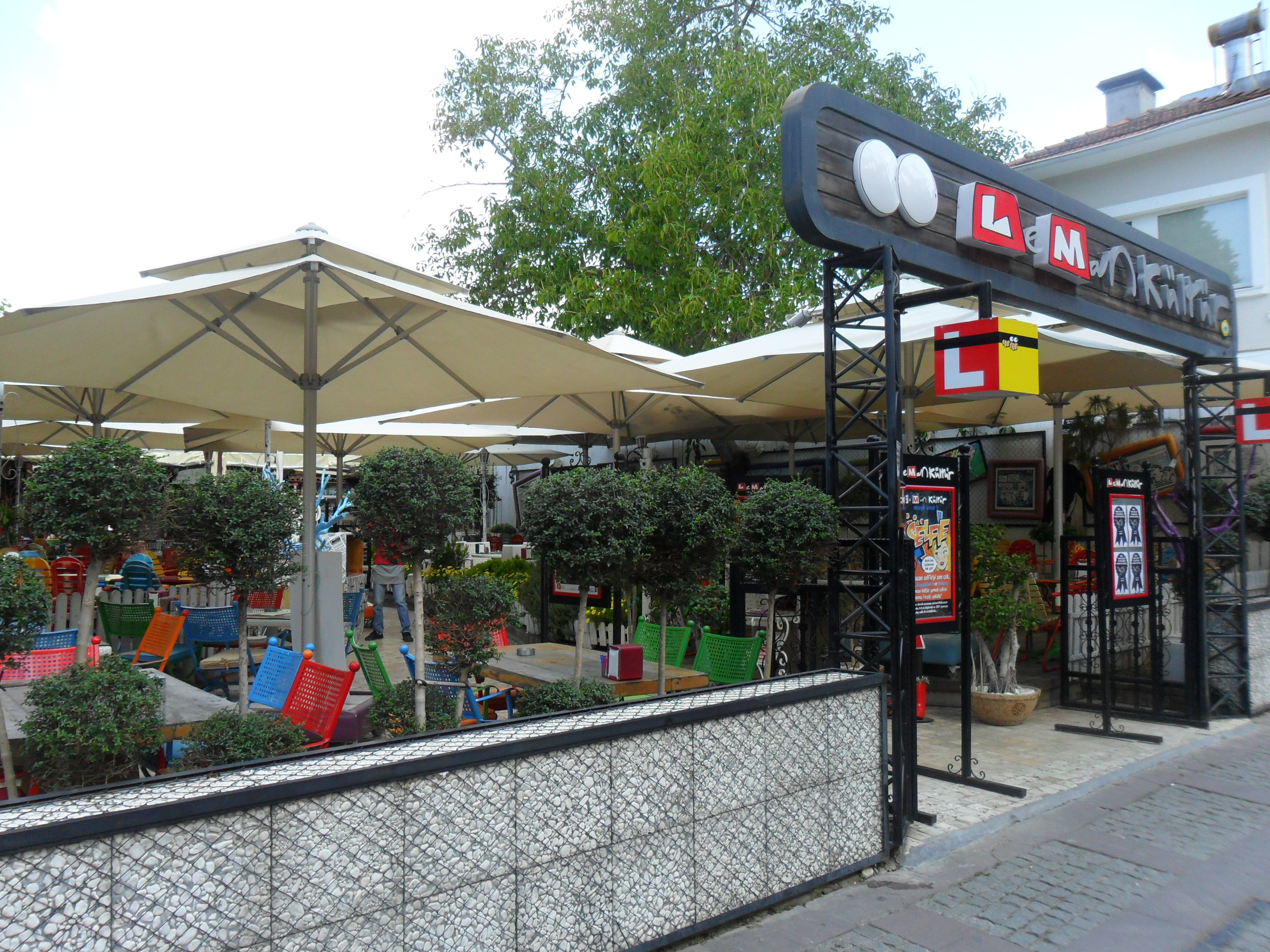
One of branches of LeMan Kültür in Antalya.

Shortly after its foundation, LeMan magazine organized the lower floors of its office building in Beyoğlu as the "LeMan Cultural Center". This place, whose decoration reflects the cartoon world of LeMan and where Cem Yılmaz made a name for himself as a comedian by performing his first show, still serves as a café-bar where concerts, interviews and stand-up shows can be held, as well as a small shop and exhibition areas where LeMan magazine products are sold. In recent years, LeMan Kültür has opened branches in many other cities and has turned into a chain of cafés.

== LeMan group magazines ==
(Some of these magazines published by the LeMan magazine group have been closed down, some of them are still being published.)

- L-Manyak
- Öküz
- Atom
- Git
- Yeni Harman
- Red
- O-Haa
- Kaçak Yayın
- Bayan Yanı

== Controversies ==
On June 26, 2025, the magazine has faced significant backlash for its content, particularly for cartoons perceived as offensive to religious or cultural sensitivities caused embroiled in a major controversy over a cartoon that critics claimed depicted the Islamic prophet Muhammad, a figure whose visual representation is considered forbidden in Islam. The cartoon, published in the June 26 issue, showed two figures labeled Muhammad handshaked Moses with "As-salamu alaykum" in Arabic, to which he responds "Aleichem Shalom" in Hebrew, interpreted by some as a commentary on the Israel-Palestine conflict. The magazine denied that the cartoon depicted the Islamic prophet Muhammad. In the cartoon they are depicted shaking hands above it as the Middle East is being bombed. Due to this cartoon, several Islamist and fundamentalist groups, such as the youth of Great Eastern Islamic Raiders' Front outraged heated protested at the magazine's headquarters in Beyoğlu, the Istanbul Chief Public Prosecutor's Office organized a protest at the magazine's headquarters in Beyoğlu, and the Istanbul Chief Public Prosecutor's Office decided that the Turkish Penal Code Article 216. Article 2 of the Constitution, initiated a judicial investigation on the charge of "publicly denigrating religious values" and ordered the detention of four people, including the magazine's publisher, editor-in-chief and managing editor. At the outset of the protests, an individual in the vicinity expressed opposition to the protesters by hurling beer at them, which led to the injury of a police officer. Meanwhile, protesters employed provocative language targeting secularism and secular people of society, inciting violence through hate speech. In addition to the reaction of religious societies, the cartoon was condemned by moderate and secularist political circles. Then, access to the website has been blocked by the authorities.

== Writers and illustrators ==
- Güneri İçoğlu
- Kaan Ertem
- Bahadır Baruter
- Can Barslan
- Selçuk Erdem
- Erdil Yaşaroğlu
- Cem Yılmaz
- Behiç Pek
- Tuncay Akgün
- Kemal Aratan
- Atilla Atalay
- Ahmet Yılmaz
- Suat Özkan
- Mehmet Çağçağ
- Bahadır Boysal
- Gökhan Dabak
- Metin Fidan
- Sefer Selvi
- Feyhan Güver
- Ramize Erer
- Betül Yılmaz
- Nihat Genç
- Mesud Ata
- Erhan Candan
- Felat Delibalta
- İpek Özsüslü
- Mahmut Tibet
- Zehra Ömeroğlu
- Utku Can Akyol
- Barış Yavaş
- Ozan Süslü
- Cem Güventürk
- Doğan Pehlevan
