= Cengiz Üstün =

Turkish comic artist

Cengiz Üstün (born 1972) is a Turkish comic artist.

== Early life and education ==
Üstün is the older brother of comic artist Bülent Üstün. He started drawing when he was 8. When he was 13 he got a drawing published in the magazine Türkiye Çocuk. He graduated from the Graphic Design Department at Mimar Sinan Fine Arts University in 1996.

== Career ==
He began his career at Pişmiş Kelle and was part of the core staff at L-Manyak along with his brother Bülent Üstün, Memo Tembelçizer, and Bahadır Baruter. They practiced comically violent, grotesque, and anarchist humor. On L-Manyak he used a gaudy, carnival-esque style. He created the Buttbanger Monster (Turkish: Kunteper Canavarı), who rapes enemies with his giant penis. The character got him popularity but brought the comic into trouble with the law. Later, he worked on magazines Avni, Dıgıl, Lombak, Penguen, Uykusuz, Kemik, and Fermuar, which his brother founded. Üstün joined the art gallery Atölye Cer around 2021. He serial published Üzeyir and Macerayı Seven Adam (English: The Man Who Loves Adventure). He also made the characters Kaptan Onedin and Tribal Enfeksiyon.

He has cited as influences the Limon magazine, Sam Raimi's Evil Dead series, Quentin Tarantino, R. Crumb, and has said the spirit of punk resonates with him.
