= Air (comics) =

Ongoing comic book series published by DC Comics

- Cover to issue #1 of Air (Oct 2008), art by M. K. Perker.

Publication information
- Publisher: Vertigo Comics
- Schedule: Monthly
- Format: Ongoing series
- Genre: Science fantasy
- Publication date: October 2008 – October 2010
- No. of issues: 24
- Main character(s): Blythe; Zayn

Creative team
- Created by: G. Willow Wilson; M. K. Perker
- Written by: G. Willow Wilson
- Artist: M. K. Perker
- Letterer: Jared K. Fletcher
- Colorist: Chris Chuckry
- Editor(s): Karen Berger; Pornsak Pichetshote; Brandon Montclare; Sarah Litt

Collected editions
- Letters from Lost Countries: ISBN 978-1401221539
- Flying Machine: ISBN 978-1401224837
- Pureland: ISBN 978-1401227067
- A History of the Future: ISBN 978-1401229832

Air is a science fantasy comic book series published by American company DC Comics as part of the Vertigo imprint. Started in 2008 and ended in 2010, it was created by writer G. Willow Wilson and artist M. K. Perker.

== Publication history ==
Creator G. Willow Wilson explained her plans for the series: "I have a solid detailed topographical map for the first year and a half and a loose hand-written treasure map for another couple of years. If this follows the four year model that has become typical of good Vertigo series lately, I'll be happy, and I've got ideas to fuel the whole run".

Wilson has also discussed the influences on the story, which partly comes from her non-fiction, journalistic work, but may also have been precipitated by one specific incident: "The concept behind Air came from Wilson's own experiences after being grilled by a flight attendant in Amsterdam for the many visas in her passport".

== Plot ==
Blythe, an acrophobic flight attendant for the fictional Clearfleet Airlines, is invited to join the "Etesian Front", which claims to be an anti-terrorist organization. The Etesians trick Blythe into transporting plans for a terrorist attack. When she discovers this, she and a man named Zayn are kidnapped and taken on board the plane that is the hijack target. Later, Zayn and Blythe leap clear of the plane as it crashes into the sea. The head of the Etesian Front, a man named Benjamin Lancaster, also survives. Zayn is later accosted by Lancaster in Narimar, a place that ostensibly disappeared from maps during the 1947 Partition of India, and interrogated as to the whereabouts of an Aztec artifact. Blythe follows him to Narimar, where she is designated by the Etesian Front a "hyperpract", that is, someone with the power to move into different dimensions or realities. The three escape Narimar, while their plane is followed by a mysterious winged serpent.

As the story progresses, the ambiguous concept of 'hyperpraxis' is introduced, as what seems to be a supernatural form of teleportation. The story develops more eccentric and fantasy elements, introducing Amelia Earhart and Quetzalcoatl as supporting characters.

== Reception ==
Neil Gaiman has compared Air to the works of Salman Rushdie and Thomas Pynchon. The series has garnered positive reviews from writers and critics including Gail Simone, Brian Azzarello, Jason Aaron, Brian Wood, The Onion A.V. Club, and The Wall Street Journal.

Greg McElhatton, reviewing the first issue for Comic Book Resources, felt it started too slowly and they were also lukewarm about the art: "It's like a strange cross between early Brandon Peterson and the Pander Brothers, with elongated, exaggerated expressions and strange tousled bunches of hair. It's not bad, but it's also not knocking my socks off either". Comics Bulletin had a "slugfest" review in which three reviewers had their say on the first issue. Matthew J. Brady felt that the "plot doesn't make any sense" and the art is "merely workmanlike", concluding "this book will have to improve by quite a bit to even raise itself to the level of passable". Joey Davidson was more positive as he felt that "the movement and pacing felt tight and well directed. There were never any moments when I found myself wondering why the hell we had been taken here". Chris Murman felt the story was interesting enough to keep him reading but felt there was a problem with engaging with the characters: "I was left with an overwhelming sense of apathy that I feel comes from the dialogue used". Davidson reviewed issue #2 and remains positive, saying that the story moves along quickly and visually the comic "is a joy to look at and you'll never be troubled or confused by layouts or scenes".

The first issue had sales estimates of 11,088 putting it at 163rd in the sales chart.

The series was canceled after 24 issues due to low sales.

== Collected editions ==
The series has been collected as trade paperbacks:

- Volume 1: Letters from Lost Countries (collects Air #1–5, 144 pages, March 2009, ISBN 1-4012-2153-X; November 2022, ISBN 1-5067-3171-6)
- Volume 2: Flying Machine (collects Air #6–10, 128 pages, October 2009, ISBN 1-4012-2483-0; March 2023, ISBN 1-5067-3172-4)
- Volume 3: Pureland (collects Air #11–17, 168 pages, May 2010, ISBN 1-4012-2706-6; July 2023, ISBN 9781506731735)
- Volume 4: A History of the Future (collects Air #18–24, 168 pages, February 2011, ISBN 1-4012-2983-2; October 2023, ISBN 9781506731742)
