= Galip Tekin =

Turkish comic artist, cartoonist, and screenwriter

- Born: 20 April 1958 Konya, Turkey
- Died: 6 July 2017 (aged 59) Istanbul, Turkey
- Areas: Artist, cartoonist
- Notable works: Tuhaf Öyküler; Pı'ya Mektuplar

Galip Tekin (20 April 1958 – 6 July 2017) was a Turkish comic book artist, cartoonist and screenwriter. He was known for his works in the fantasy and science fiction genres. His style is often compared to that of Jean "Mœbius" Giraud.

== Biography ==
Tekin started his comics career in Gırgır magazine in 1978. The following year, he dropped out of Istanbul State Academy of Fine Arts to pursue a career in Gırgır. Throughout the 1980s, he published comics and comic strips in Gırgır and Fırt, as well as in Günaydın newspaper. In May 1989, he became the chief editor of the newly founded Dıgıl magazine.

In 1990s, Tekin worked in various humor magazines, including Hıbır, Fırfır, Leman, Limon and L-Manyak. In 1994, he published his best-known comic series, Pı'ya Mektuplar. In 1994 and 2000, he started lecturing as a comic book instructor in Boğaziçi and Istanbul Bilgi University, respectively, pioneering the Comics studies in Turkey.

In 2008, he was arrested for allegedly conspiring to hire a contract killer after a shootout at Kemancı Bar in Taksim, which he was a co-owner of. He was subsequently released after charges against him were dropped. During the 7 months of his detention, Tekin made 850 different illustrations, which were adapted into a textbook.

In 2011, Tekin started compiling his best known works under the series Tuhaf Öyküler. In 2012, some of his comic book stories were adapted into a television series under the name Acayip Hikayeler, with Tekin writing the screenplay for 4 episodes. The series was cancelled that year.

Having also previously worked for Penguen, Tekin last worked for Uykusuz.

Tekin taught Art of Animation course at Bogazici University. Some of his former students are Ozge Samanci and Feyzi Özşahin.

== Death ==
Tekin was found dead in his house in Arnavutkoy, Istanbul, on 6 July 2017 at the entry of his apartment.

== Selected works ==
- Tuhaf Öyküler 1 (2011)
- Tuhaf Öyküler 2 (2011)
- Tuhaf Öyküler 3 (2012)

== Filmography ==
Television

- Acayip Hikayeler (2012)
