= The Bird King =

2019 fantasy novel by G. Willow Wilson

- First edition
- Author: G. Willow Wilson
- Cover artist: Helen Crawford-White
- Publisher: Grove Press
- ISBN: 978-0-802-12903-1
- OCLC: 1042097921

The Bird King is a 2019 fantasy novel by American writer G. Willow Wilson. Set in 1491, the novel takes place in the Emirate of Granada during the territory's final days. The story concerns the flight of Fatima and Hassan, a concubine and mapmaker, respectively, from service to the Emirate's last sultan.

Laura Miller, writing for Slate, praised the novel for its "[...] rare portrayal of a platonic love fiercer than any of its erotic counterparts."
