= A-Force =

Comic book series

- Cover of A-Force #1 (May 2015). Art by Jim Cheung and Laura Martin.

Group publication information
- Publisher: Marvel Comics
- First appearance: A-Force #1 (May 2015)
- Created by: G. Willow Wilson; Marguerite Bennett; Jorge Molina

In-story information
- Leader(s): She-Hulk
- Member(s): See below

A-Force

Series publication information
- Format: Ongoing series
- Genre: Superhero
- Publication date: Vol. 1: May 2015 – October 2015; Vol. 2: January 2016 – October 2016
- Number of issues: Vol. 1: 5 Vol. 2: 10

Creative team
- Writer(s): List: Vol. 1: Marguerite Bennett; G. Willow Wilson; Vol. 2; G. Willow Wilson; Kelly Thompson
- Penciller(s): List: Vol. 1–2: Jorge Molina; Ben Caldwell; Paulo Siqueira
- Inker(s): List: Vol. 1: Craig Yeoung; Vol. 2: Scott Hanna
- Colorist(s): List: Vol. 1–2: Laura Martin; Vol. 2: Ian Herring; Rachelle Rosenberg
- Creator(s): G. Willow Wilson; Marguerite Bennett; Jorge Molina

A-Force is a comic book series published by Marvel Comics that debuted in May 2015 as a part of Marvel's "Secret Wars" crossover storyline. It was created by writers G. Willow Wilson, Marguerite Bennett, and artist Jorge Molina. It features Marvel's first all-female Avengers team called the A-Force. The team first appeared as part of an alternate universe during "Secret Wars" but later reemerged in Marvel's primary continuity.

The comic book series generally received positive reviews from critics. It has been described as "decidedly feminist."

== Publication history ==
In February 2015, Marvel Comics announced that they would launch A-Force in May 2015. The series, written by G. Willow Wilson (Ms. Marvel) and Marguerite Bennett (Angela: Asgard's Assassin) and drawn by Jorge Molina (X-Men), features Marvel's first all-female team of Avengers. The team, led by She-Hulk, initially consists of Dazzler, Medusa, Nico Minoru and Singularity, a new "cosmic powered" hero, but features many more characters. Wilson stated that Marvel editor Daniel Ketchum mandated that the team be composed entirely of female characters, but gave the writers total discretion when it came to which women to choose. Ketchum also brought in Bennett, whom he worked with on Nightcrawler, to co-write the series with Wilson. The series takes place within Marvel's 2015 "Secret Wars" crossover storyline, which finds the entire Marvel Universe, including the Avengers, disbanded. What is left is a patchwork of different environments and on one such environment called Arcadia, which Wilson describes as a "feminist paradise", a familiar threat arises that forces A-Force to come together. Bennett elaborated,

It's this world where the Marvel heroines are leaders in their own civilization. I really didn't want to have some kind of validating reason... So I didn't want to do anything like, "all the men disappeared years ago" or "ever since all the menfolk were killed in that war" or something like that. There are men—there are heroes there. You'll see familiar faces and favorites, but the heroines are in charge, by majority. It's just this is how their world evolved. They were competent. They were clever and they were the ones in charge because of their skills and they were the best fit for these roles and demands of their world.

About the roster Wilson said, "We've purposefully assembled a team composed of very different characters—from disparate parts of the Marvel U, with very different power sets, identities and ideologies. They'll all have to come together to answer some big questions: What would you sacrifice to succeed? What is being a hero worth?" Wilson elaborated:

This an opportunity to put people who would normally have no reason to interact with each other on one team... I want people whose power sets really build on each other so that there are specific limitations that can only become overcome by working together. Nobody's so overpowered that it gets boring and nobody's so underpowered that they have to be saved all the time. I wanted a balance visually and practically... What's also going to be interesting is working out the power structure of the group. You have several people on it who are used to being either their own bosses or in a leadership position, and all of a sudden they're together.

Bennett explained that although the team features a broader roster, Dazzler, Medusa, She-Hulk, Singularity and Nico Minoru make up the core members. Bennett stated that she found Dazzler's optimism to be the most interesting explaining, "It's really hard to write a dark and dire book if you've got Dazzler there beside you." Regarding the dynamic between Medusa and She-Hulk, Bennett said,

They're both leaders and there's a lot of conflict between them. They are very supportive of one another when operating against a third party, but they also disagree with how things should be handled when it comes to crises. Medusa is monarchy; She-Hulk is democracy. Medusa is the right of queens and She-Hulk is the rule of law. She-Hulk is much more balanced than Medusa. It's the two of them playing off of their strengths and sometime playing off of each other for both necessary good and necessary evil.

The series also introduces a new character named Singularity, a pocket universe that gains self-consciousness during "Secret Wars". Wilson likened Singularity to Q from Star Trek: The Next Generation and said, "Her entire existence is so unlike that of ours that she really has to learn about what we think of as being an individual and having an identity from the ground up, with no point of access except those she meets." Wilson also stated that Singularity can act as "a whole world within herself and she can also move between different worlds and dimensions like taking a walk, so she has access to all corners of the Marvel U in a way that other characters do not." "[Nico Minoru is] one of the first people we have encounter Singularity," Bennett revealed. "So Nico is put in charge of acclimating this character and showing her their civilization and world while trying to save it. Nico is sort of like the grounding human force and the anchor that begins to show Singularity the capacity of human beings, both for good and for evil, so Nico becomes even more invested when she starts to see her homeland through the eyes of this stranger."

At the 2015 Chicago Comic & Entertainment Expo, Marvel announced that A-Force would continue into All-New, All-Different Marvel, the next phase of Marvel Universe after the end of "Secret Wars", with a second volume. Wilson said, "After 'Secret Wars', things don't go back to status quo. There [are] long-term repercussions for what has happened in Battleworld. What the aftermath of Secret Wars is for all of those characters who were together in Arcadia who are now waking up in the Marvel Universe... I'm not going to say. But they're going to have to deal probably more directly with those repercussions than any of the other teams in the aftermath of Secret Wars."

In January 2016, Marvel announced that writer Kelly Thompson, who co-wrote A-Force vol. 2, #2, will take over the series with artist Ben Caldwell starting with issue 5. Thompson stated that while she respects the way Wilson built the team, in a world where women are the primary heroes, she does not intend on making stories that are "unique to women". Thompson explained, "It's a comic about super heroes saving the day, plain and simple, and I approach writing them like I would writing anyone. These ladies are heroes just like any of their male colleagues."

In August 2016, A-Force tied into the "Civil War II" storyline beginning with issue #8. About the crossover, Thompson said, "There's no way, with our cast, that we weren't going to get drawn into it – Carol is obviously the big co-star of "Civil War II" and both Medusa and She-Hulk are poised to play big roles too. But I think we've got a really great A-Force story that ties directly to the event but will also stand on its own nicely. Because of the intricacies of "Civil War II" the ideas behind the event really pull our team apart – so what we're doing is a very personal and emotional gut punch of a story for these ladies who were sort of just getting started as friends and as a team."

In October 2016, a day before the release of issue #10, it was reported that A-Force was "effectively cancelled" after no new issues were listed among Marvel's November, December, or January solicitations. The report came despite Thompson's intentions to continue the series after "Civil War II" with a storyline that involved an "unspecified A-lister". Sales of A-Force had fallen by 79% since its debut with issue #1 selling 114,528 copies and issue #9 selling 23,484 copies. However, in a letter written to the fans in the back pages of A-Force #10, Thompson described it as "short hiatus" followed by an editorial note claiming that A-Force would be back and that fans could speed up its return by emailing Marvel.

The series was cancelled in October 2016 due to the sales of A-Force Vol. 2 declining.

== Roster ==
=== Secret Wars ===
Character	Real name	Introduced in	Notes
Captain Marvel	Carol Danvers	A-Force vol. 1 #1 (May 2015)	
Crystal	Crystallia Amaquelin	A-Force vol. 1 #1 (May 2015)	
Dazzler	Alison Blaire	A-Force vol. 1 #1 (May 2015)	
Jessica Jones		A-Force vol. 1 #1 (May 2015)	
Loki		A-Force vol. 1 #1 (May 2015)	Female version, arrested in A-Force #5.
Medusa	Medusalith Amaquelin Boltagon	A-Force vol. 1 #1 (May 2015)	Killed in A-Force #3.
Miss America	America Chavez	A-Force vol. 1 #1 (May 2015)	Banished in A-Force #1.
Phoenix	Jean Grey-Summers	A-Force vol. 1 #1 (May 2015)	
Pixie	Megan Gwynne	A-Force vol. 1 #1 (May 2015)	
Meggan Puceanu		A-Force vol. 1 #1 (May 2015)	
She-Hulk	Jennifer Walters	A-Force vol. 1 #1 (May 2015)	Team leader; baroness of Arcadia.
Singularity		A-Force vol. 1 #1 (May 2015)	Sacrifices herself in A-Force #5.
Sister Grimm	Nico Minoru	A-Force vol. 1 #1 (May 2015)	
Spectrum	Monica Rambeau	A-Force vol. 1 #1 (May 2015)	
Spider-Woman	Jessica Drew	A-Force vol. 1 #1 (May 2015)	
Spider-Woman	Gwen Stacy	A-Force vol. 1 #1 (May 2015)	
Storm	Ororo Munroe	A-Force vol. 1 #1 (May 2015)	
Emma Frost		A-Force vol. 1 #3 (August 2015)	
Hawkeye	Kate Bishop	A-Force vol. 1 #3 (August 2015)	
Ms. Marvel	Kamala Khan	A-Force vol. 1 #3 (August 2015)	
Scarlet Witch	Wanda Maximoff	A-Force vol. 1 #3 (August 2015)	
Spider-Girl	Anya Corazon	A-Force vol. 1 #3 (August 2015)	
Squirrel Girl	Doreen Green	A-Force vol. 1 #3 (August 2015)	
Agent 13	Sharon Carter	A-Force vol. 1 #5 (October 2015)	
Angela	Angela Odinsdottir	A-Force vol. 1 #5 (October 2015)	
Armor	Hisako Ichiki	A-Force vol. 1 #5 (October 2015)	
Black Cat	Felicia Hardy	A-Force vol. 1 #5 (October 2015)	
Clea		A-Force vol. 1 #5 (October 2015)	
Karolina Dean		A-Force vol. 1 #5 (October 2015)	
Domino	Neena Thurman	A-Force vol. 1 #5 (October 2015)	
Dust	Sooraya Qadir	A-Force vol. 1 #5 (October 2015)	
Elektra Natchios		A-Force vol. 1 #5 (October 2015)	
Enchantress	Amora	A-Force vol. 1 #5 (October 2015)	
Firestar	Angelica Jones	A-Force vol. 1 #5 (October 2015)	
Molly Hayes		A-Force vol. 1 #5 (October 2015)	
Jubilee	Jubilation Lee	A-Force vol. 1 #5 (October 2015)	
M	Monet St. Croix	A-Force vol. 1 #5 (October 2015)	
Mirage	Dani Moonstar	A-Force vol. 1 #5 (October 2015)	
Mockingbird	Barbara Morse	A-Force vol. 1 #5 (October 2015)	
Moondragon	Heather Douglas	A-Force vol. 1 #5 (October 2015)	
Psylocke	Betsy Braddock	A-Force vol. 1 #5 (October 2015)	
Rescue	Pepper Potts	A-Force vol. 1 #5 (October 2015)	
Rogue	Anna Marie	A-Force vol. 1 #5 (October 2015)	
Shadowcat	Kitty Pryde	A-Force vol. 1 #5 (October 2015)	
Snowbird	Narya	A-Force vol. 1 #5 (October 2015)	
Stature	Cassandra Lang	A-Force vol. 1 #5 (October 2015)	
Tigra	Greer Grant	A-Force vol. 1 #5 (October 2015)	
Black Widow	Natasha Romanova	A-Force vol. 1 #5 (October 2015)	
X-23	Laura Kinney	A-Force vol. 1 #5 (October 2015)	
Mariko Yashida		A-Force vol. 1 #5 (October 2015)	
Gertrude Yorkes			

=== Post-Secret Wars ===
Character	Real name	Joined in	Notes
Captain Marvel	Carol Danvers	A-Force vol. 2 #1 (January 2016)	
Medusa	Medusalith Amaquelin Boltagon	A-Force vol. 2 #1 (January 2016)	
She-Hulk	Jennifer Walters	A-Force vol. 2 #1 (January 2016)	
Singularity		A-Force vol. 2 #1 (January 2016)	
Nico Minoru		A-Force vol. 2 #2 (February 2016)	
Dazzler	Alison Blaire	A-Force vol. 2 #2 (February 2016)	
Dazzler Thor	Alison Blaire	A-Force vol. 2 #5 (May 2016)	Dies in A-Force vol. 2 #7 (July 2016)

== Plot ==
=== Secret Wars ===
A-Force, the defenders of the matriarchal Battleworld nation of Arcadia, responds to a megalodon attack while on routine patrol. During the attack, America Chavez throws the shark across the Shield, the wall that separates their borders, thus breaking the laws of God Emperor Doom and is subsequently arrested by Doom's enforcers, the Thor Corps. Despite appeals from Arcadia's baroness She-Hulk Chavez is sentenced to spend the rest of her life on the wall. In response, She-Hulk tasks the Sub-Mariners - Namor, Namorita, and Namora - to find the source of the megalodon attack. Meanwhile, Nico Minoru, lamenting the loss of Chavez, comes across a mysterious figure that fell out of the sky.

The Sub-Mariners discover a strange portal in the ocean's depths but it implodes as they draw near. Later at the behest of female Loki, Minoru introduces her new friend to She-Hulk. When Medusa accuses the stranger, a sentient pocket universe, of creating the portal, a Sentinel falls from another portal and attacks the team. During the fight, the newcomer saves Dazzler and convinces She-Hulk that she is not the cause. After destroying the Sentinel, She-Hulk decides to travel through the still open portal and investigate the source herself.

She-Hulk arrives in the Sentinel Territories and after a brief encounter with more Sentinels, she is chased back to Arcadia by the Thor Corps. The Thor Corps follow in pursuit, but Medusa manages to repel them back into the portal and is killed in the process. When the Thor Corps return, She-Hulk alerts the citizens of Arcadia that there is a traitor in their midst that is spreading discontent and vows to bring them to justice as she and other A-Forcers go into hiding inside the newcomer.

The newcomer smuggles A-Force outside the city. There, She-Hulk realizes that the portals' energy is of Asgardian origin and they deduce that the traitor is Loki. With A-Force outlawed, Loki is set to be crowned the new baroness of Arcadia, but is preemptively attacked by A-Force. After Loki is defeated, she releases a final blast of energy that breaches the Shield thus allowing the zombie horde on the other side to enter.

As the horde approaches, She-Hulk rallies A-Force, the Thor Corps, and other heroes of Arcadia in defense of Arcadia. During the fight, the zombies begin to overwhelm the city but the newcomer – now named Singularity – absorbs the entire horde, sacrificing herself in the process. In the aftermath of the battle, the Thor Corps arrests Loki as A-Force begins reconstruction of Arcadia. Meanwhile, She-Hulk comforts Minoru, who is still mourning the loss of her friends, telling her that she believes Singularity lives on.

=== All-New, All-Different Marvel ===
Following the conclusion of "Secret Wars," Singularity awakes in the primary Earth-616 universe and quickly spots Carol Danvers but Danvers does not recognize her. Unbeknownst to Singularity, she is being pursued by a similar being named Antimatter. While Danvers confronts Antimatter, Singularity flees to New York City. With Antimatter still in pursuit, Singularity locates She-Hulk, who does not remember her either, and asks for help. As the pair fight Antimatter, Medusa arrives with reinforcements and takes Singularity into custody.

After Antimatter kills one of Medusa's soldiers, she releases Singularity and teleports Antimatter to the moon. Realizing that physical attacks are having little effect on Antimatter, Singularity transports She-Hulk, Medusa and herself to Japan to seek the help of Minoru. When Antimatter returns, Minoru casts a spell that causes him to be temporarily unmade. The spell buys the women some time during which Danvers suggests that Antimatter maybe susceptible to intense levels of light particles. They then travel to Miami to recruit Dazzler just as Antimatter remerges.

Dazzler hits Antimatter with everything she has to no avail but it gives Danvers time to activate a containment device that she designed. When Antimatter overloads the device, Singularity has Minoru remove Antimatter's tracking ability and transports the team to The Peak. As Antimatter eventually reaches The Peak, She-Hulk orders Singularity to stay behind while the rest of the team leaves to parley with Antimatter. After talks fail, Antimatter fatally wounds Dazzler and in turn She-Hulk decapitates Antimatter. Angered by Dazzler's death, Singularity leaves to confront a recovered Antimatter one-on-one.

As Singularity fights Antimatter, Dr. Tempest Bell, The Peak's lead scientist, develops a bomb capable of destroying Antimatter but denoting it will also kill Singularity. She-Hulk, Minoru and Danvers go to reinforce Singularity, while Medusa places the bomb inside Antimatter. Just as the bomb explodes, a revived Dazzler arrives with a dimensional teleporter and whisks Singularity away from the blast. With Antimatter destroyed, the team celebrates at a diner when Singularity senses a disturbance as remnants of Antimatter tear open portals to other worlds.

In Astoria, Oregon, A-Force tracks a dragon from Battleworld named Countess and discover that she is being pursued by an alternate version of Dazzler that belonged to the Thor Corps. A-Force joins Dazzler Thor in combat which causes Countess to retreat. As the heroes wait for Countess's return, Dazzler confides to Dazzler Thor that she has been infected by the Terrigen Mist and is dying. When Countess arrives, she takes control of Minoru who then incapacitates the team.

She-Hulk, Medusa, Dazzler, Dazzler Thor, and Danvers awake in a jail cell in Astoria to discover that their powers are gone and the populace under the control of the Countess. After She-Hulk taunts the Countess, she has Minoru turn She-Hulk against the others. As the fight with She-Hulk takes the team away from the city and their powers return, the Countess has Minoru turn their feet into cement shoes and drag them under water.

As the team is about to drown, Minoru commands them to breathe. Once out of the water, She-Hulk sends half the team to distract Countess, while the others rescue Minoru. After being rescued, Minoru reveals the true nature of Countess' powers and returns with Dazzler and Dazzler Thor to confront Countess. Minoru convinces Countess to have a change of heart as Dazzler Thor succumbs to the compounded effects that the Terrigen Mist are having on her otherworldly system. After Dazzler Thor's body vanishes, Dazzler warns her teammates that she may suffer a similar fate.

=== Civil War II ===
After She-Hulk is gravely wounded in a battle with Thanos during the "Civil War II" storyline, Danvers tells Minoru that the Inhuman Ulysses Cain had a vision of her killing a woman named Alice. Refusing to be arrested for a crime that she has yet to commit, Minoru flees to a safehouse in Ouray, Colorado. Unbeknownst to Minoru, the town is under attack from a swarm of giant bugs and encounters Elsa Bloodstone. Bloodstone informs Minoru that the attack is the result of an infection that is turning the populace into insects and takes her to meet Janine, whose daughter Alice has gone missing during the commotion. Meanwhile, Danvers and Medusa race to find Minoru before Dazzler and Singularity, who disagree with their methods.

Danvers and Medusa find Minoru and Bloodstone just before Dazzler and Singularity arrive. After a brief confrontation, they agree to split into two teams: one to find Alice and the other to protect the civilians. While searching for Alice in an abandoned mine, Danvers, Minoru and Bloodstone are attacked by a giant bug. The bug incapacitates Danvers and Bloodstone before telepathically communicating to Minoru that she is Alice and has been inadvertently infecting the townspeople after her transformation. Alice tells Minoru that killing her is the only way to save the people. When Minrou refuses, an infected Bloodstone threatens to kill Danvers.

Medusa, Singularity, and an infected Dazzler are overrun by bugs and regroup with the others just as Bloodstone infects Danvers. After Dazzler infects Medusa, Minoru casts a spell to transform Alice back into a human but it does not cure the rest of the populace. Alice explains that she must be killed and Minoru reluctantly casts a death spell on Alice which transforms the infected back into humans. Alice then remerges in her final form and tells A-Force that she is no longer a threat as she now has greater control of her powers. When the commotion is over, Danvers and Minoru continue to disagree over each other's actions, but agree to visit She-Hulk together in the hospital.

== Reception ==
=== Critical response ===
Neeraj Chand of MovieWeb stated that "many fans have been clamoring to see the A-Force in the MCU." Comic Book Resources ranked the A-Force team 2nd in their "10 Most Fashionable Teams In Marvel Comics" list, 5th in their "10 Marvel Teams That Deserve Their Own Disney+ Series" list, 9th in their "10 Best All-Female Superhero Teams" list, 9th in their "10 Marvel Super-Teams Who Deserve A Comeback" list, and 11th in their "25 Most Powerful Avengers Teams" list. Bradley Prom of Screen Rant included the A-Force team in their "MCU: 10 Teams Who Should Get Their Own Movie Or Disney+ Show" list.

== Literary reception ==
=== Secret Wars ===
==== Issue 1 ====
According to Diamond Comic Distributors, A-Force #1 was the 6th best selling comic book in May 2015.

Professional reviews
	CBR	IGN	Newsarama
Issue	Rating		
1	4.5/5 stars	8.4/10	8/10
2	4/5 stars	8/10	8/10
3	3.5/5 stars	7.3/10	8/10
4	3/5 stars	6.8/10	7/10
5	—N/a	—N/a	—N/a

Greg McElhatton of Comic Book Resources gave A-Force #1 a grade of 4.5 out of 5 stars, writing, "A-Force #1 is a triumph, taking a concept that could have simply been dashed off and then ignored and turning it into a book that I'd cheerfully read every month. Even if Secret Wars itself is unappealing, this book muscles its way into your heart through sheer quality. If there are any books that somehow survive the end of "Secret Wars," I'd love for this to be one. A-Force is an A-Plus." Jesse Schedeen of IGN gave A-Force #1 a grade of 8.4 out of 10, saying, "While certain details regarding the nature of this team and their connection to the old marvel Universe remain unclear, A-Force #1 marks a worthy debut for Marvel's newest team book. It's fun and fast-paced, but also features great characterization and clear ties to the larger framework of Secret Wars. Marvel picked a solid creative team for this series, and it's already paying off." Lan Pitts of Newsarama gave A-Force #1 a grade of 8 out of 10, praising the artwork of Jorge Molina, Laura Martin, and Matt Milla. Tony Guerrero of Comic Vine gave A-Force #1 a grade of 4 out of 5 stars, stating, "This book was pretty much exactly what I wanted and hoped for. Too many times the female heroes in the Marvel Universe get overlooked. Marguerite Bennett and G. Willow Wilson have created a natural feeling world. It's easy to cry out that having just female heroes is a gimmick but it all simply works here. And it works in a great way. You'll find yourself wanting to know more of the region and the relationship and connections each character has with one another. There's just a wonderful vibe going on. Jorge Molina's art and Laura Martin and Matt Milla's colors add to that. With actual ties to the main SECRET WARS book, this doesn't feel like an isolated story done just for the heck of it. You get a sense that it is part of the bigger story. This is our chance to explore the specific region closely and you'll be glad you got the chance. I'm so ready for the next issue now." Eric Diaz of The Nerdist gave A-Force #1 a grade of 3 out of 5, asserting, "Overall the issue was fine, and I'm curious to see where it all goes, but I'm far more eager to see what can be done with this grouping of awesome female heroes once the wacky conceit of Secret Wars is over and they return to the Marvel Universe proper." Diaz also noted that, "[Marvel is] making a decidedly feminist statement by taking nearly all of their major female heroes and putting them together in their own Avengers title called A-Force."

==== Issue 2 ====
According to Diamond Comic Distributors, A-Force #2 was the 24th best selling comic book in July 2015.

Doug Zawisza of Comic Book Resources gave A-Force #2 a grade of 4 out of 5 stars, asserting "A-Force #2 appears to be a straightforward superheroine adventure on the surface but, as the pages turn, Bennett, Wilson, Molina, Yeung, Wong, Martin and Petit make it quite clear this isn't a straightforward anything. The mystery of the new arrival and whether or not the portals are hers would be enough but, embedded in the policies of Battleworld and the surrounding bureaucracy of it all, this story gets more personal. Easily dismissed as a gimmick, A-Force is anything but, packing in strong characters, smart characterization and wonderful artwork." Jeff Lake of IGN gave A-Force #2 a grade of 8 out of 10, saying "The first issue of A-Force provided a fine mix of boisterous action and engaging character work, all of which effectively tied into the larger Battleworld picture. Issue #2 offers much of the same, C. Willow Wilson and Marguerite Bennett both focusing the direction of the main narrative as they expand their characters place within it. The writers toss in magic portals and robot showdowns aplenty, but the real fun comes with their introduction of a mysterious new character. This unnamed entrant is interesting enough on her own, but becomes more so as we see how each A-Force member reacts around her. This new layer adds a welcome intrigue to Battleworld as a whole, as the team sets to unravel a mystery outside of their normal universe. Jorge Molina has a great time with the aforementioned newbie, his take silent but mischievous. His gift for nuanced expression again carries the book through its more emotional confrontations, not to mention he draws a pretty sweet battle sequence. -Jeff" Richard Gray of Newsarama gave A-Force #2 a grade of 8 out of 10, writing, "With the introduction of a new heroine and a new threat, the issue skillfully plays to the strengths of the ensemble, from She-Hulk's natural leadership, Medusa's ruthless decision making and former Runaway Nico Minoru's compassion."

==== Issue 3 ====
According to Diamond Comic Distributors, A-Force #3 was the 27th best selling comic book in August 2015.

C.K. Stewart of Newsarama gave A-Force #3 a grade of 8 out of 10, saying, "A-Force gets stronger with each passing issue, and the dramatic turns at the end of A-Force #3 make it the best issue yet." Jeff Lake of IGN gave A-Force #3 a grade of 7.3, saying, "A-Force finds itself in an interesting predicament here in issue #3. The inclusion of a mysterious traitor lends a needed sense of conflict to the book's events, but the lack of substantive development leaves that same reveal feeling slightly underserved. Perhaps it's partly because of the book's Secret Wars restraints, but as of yet the book's level of investment and development doesn't quite match its escalation. Thankfully, this is one example where the book's art is able to mask any narrative quibbles. Jorge Molina turns in another dynamite installment, his clean lines and powerful poses giving added life to C. Willow Wilson and Marguerite Bennett's script. The issue contains a number of standout moments, from dynamic splash pages to more contained emotional beats, and it's through Molina's whimsical, impish quality that the team's still unnamed "friend" remains so intriguing. There's still a lot of potential here, we just need a bit more event book freedom to see it realized." Marykate Jasper of Comic Book Resources gave A-Force #3 a grade of 3.5 out of 5 stars, asserting, "Altogether, A-Force still has a lot going for it, but the pacing is compounding the problems of its large cast. Luckily, issue #3 takes many of the necessary steps for ramping the pace back up, and I'm optimistic for issue #4."

==== Issue 4 ====
According to Diamond Comic Distributors, A-Force #4 was the 19th best selling comic book in September 2015.

David Pepose of Newsarama gave A-Force #4 a grade of 7 out of 10, saying, "It's a good thing this book looks so good, because the plot definitely feels flat, with the reveal of A-Force's traitor - and her endgame after being easily overcome - feels particularly undercooked." Levi Hunt of IGN gave A-Force #4 a 6.8 out of 10, asserting, "Jorge Molina's art is once again the best thing about A-Force as the series hits its least narratively satisfying issue. The underserved nature of the book's development has led to a conflict that has few real emotional stakes." Greg McElhatton of Comic Book Resources gave A-Force #4 a grade of 3 out of 5 stars, stating, "While A-Force #4 is not a bad comic, Marguerite Bennett, G. Willow Wilson, Jorge Molina, Craig Yeung and Walden Wong's latest installment clearly tries to get a lot of the exposition onto the table as the plot gears up for next month's conclusion, and that original sense of wonder and newness is greatly diminished as a result."

=== All-New, All-Different Marvel ===
==== Issue 1 ====
According to Diamond Comic Distributors, A-Force #1 was the 12th best selling comic book in January 2016.

Professional reviews
	CBR	IGN	Newsarama
Issue	Rating		
1	3/5 stars	7.0/10	8/10
2	—N/a	8.5/10	9/10
3	3.5/5 stars	7.5/10	8/10
4	4/5 stars	7.8/10	—N/a
5	4/5 stars	—N/a	—N/a
6	—N/a	7.3/10	—N/a
7	—N/a	—N/a	—N/a

David Pepose of Newsarama gave A-Force #1 a grade of 8 out of 10, stating, "While this book starts off with a shaky foundation - namely, that you have to have read a Secret Wars tie-in to understand where Singularity came from - Wilson does a great job at firming things up, with her new heroine proving to be a fun addition to the Marvel Universe." Greg McElhatton of Comic Book Resources gave A-Force #1 a grade of 3 out of 5 stars, writing, "Ultimately, I wish the narration from Singularity had been dropped entirely from "A-Force" #1. You can still understand what's going on without it, and the disparate clash of her thoughts and dialogue would have never happened. Hopefully, they will get smoothed out a bit in future issues, but—for now—this issue is only alright." Jeff Lake of IGN gave A-Force #1 a grade of 7.0 out of 10, asserting, "Overall, A-Force #1 is a solid, if unspectacular debut. It's great to see this cast together again, especially in the hands of Wilson, Molina and Martin, but as of now this new direction feels hamstrung by its need to square peg its way into a round hole."

==== Issue 2 ====
According to Diamond Comic Distributors, A-Force #2 was the 48th best selling comic book in February 2016.

Justin Partridge of Newsarama gave A-Force #2 a grade of 9 out of 10, saying, "A-Force #2 reads like a Sleater-Kinney song sounds: all confident bravado and a relentless pace. While the original series was inescapably tied to a company wide, Kelly Thompson, G. Willow Wilson, Jorge Molina and Laura Martin quickly cast off those ropes of continuity to let these ladies stand on their own and get down to the important work of punching weird stuff and giving each other sass." Jeff Lake of IGN gave A-Force #2 a grade of 8.5 out of 10, writing, "That's more like it. Following a passable but limited debut, A-Force takes a welcome leap courtesy of Kelly Thompson, G. Willow Wilson and Jorge Molina. At its core the issue is little more than an extension of the book's initial premise, with the universe-addled Singularity continuing to search for her long lost "friends". The difference here is that with the cast growing in size, Singularity is able to simply join the story without needing to drive it. This results in come excellent character play, as writers Thompson and Wilson jet-set their heroines around from misadventure to misadventure. There's such a great mix of personality here, from Medusa's regal above-it-all-air to Nico's rebellious indignation, and artist Molina captures each individual voice wonderfully. His physicality and expression is excellently nuanced, ensuring that no character looks or feels the same. When combined with another round of action packed visuals and pitch perfect humor, you get an issue much closer to the original series' spirit."

==== Issue 3 ====
According to Diamond Comic Distributors, A-Force #3 was the 53rd best selling comic book in March 2016.

Justin Partridge of Newsarama gave A-Force #3 a grade of 8 out of 10, asserting, "Writers Kelly Thompson and G. Willow Wilson continue the dazzling chemistry and tension between the team while at the same time keeping each woman's voice on point and selling Antimatter as a real threat to the team." Jeff Lake of IGN gave A-Force #3 a grade of 7.5 out of 10, saying, "Bucking the usual slow roll-out most super team books enjoy, A-Force's latest is again a high energy affair. Where last issue saw Kelly Thompson and G. Willow Wilson provide a welcome jump in character development and explored relationship dynamics, issue #3 offers a more action oriented focus." Greg McElhatton of Comic Book Resources gave A-Force #3 a grade of 3.5 out of 5 stars, stating, "A-Force #3 feels like a turning point for this ongoing series. With the team fully solidified, Kelly Thompson, G. Willow Wilson and Jorge Molina begin to show readers just how these established characters will work together, even as the relatively new Singularity continues to establish herself. Bit by bit, that early potential we saw in the "Secret Wars" tie-in starts to bear fruit in A-Force #3."

==== Issue 4 ====
According to Diamond Comic Distributors, A-Force #4 was the 67th best selling comic book in April 2016.

Marykate Jasper of Comic Book Resources gave A-Force #4 a grade of 4 out of 5 stars, saying, A-Force #4 gives readers the camaraderie, compassion and quips that they've come to love and expect from this series. Jeff Lake of IGN gave A-Force #4 a grade of 7.8 out of 10, stating, "In just four short issues Kelly Thompson and G. Willow Wilson have crafted a team rife with unique personalities, in turn creating an undeniable chemistry between them that makes their unfolding adventures ones worth investing in. Issue #4 only solidifies that fact, the conclusion to the Antimatter arc resulting in plenty of great moments both joint and character specific."

==== Issue 5 ====
According to Diamond Comic Distributors, A-Force #5 was the 60th best selling comic book in May 2016.

Greg McElhattan gave of Comic Book Resources gave A-Force #5 a grade of 4 out of 5 stars, asserting, "If A-Force #5 is any indication, the series is in good hands. Thompson, Caldwell and Herring's first issue together is fun and exciting, even as there are strong character and plot hooks to keep readers coming back for more."

==== Issue 6 ====
According to Diamond Comic Distributors, A-Force #6 was the 90th best selling comic book in June 2016.

Jeff Lake of IGN gave A-Force #6 a grade of 7.3 out of 10, saying, "When it comes to A-Force, the team's chemistry goes hand in hand with its success. Case in point – issue #6 is a solid, if unspectacular affair, with a familiar villain and a by the numbers plot. What makes the issue click is its fantastic characterization, writer Kelly Thompson continuing to build off of the great chemistry generated in the book's first arc."

==== Issue 7 ====
According to Diamond Comic Distributors, A-Force #7 was the 95th best selling comic book in July 2016.

Matthew Aguilar of ComicBook.com gave A-Force #7 a grade of 5 out of 5 stars, asserting, "A-Force continues to be a joy amongst my pull list every month, and I can't recommend it highly enough. It has hard hitting fights, snappy dialogue, and above all substantial character development for the entire cast. Sure it has some cheesy sentimentality every now and then, but it never feels dated or ham-fisted, and the book always seems to be in on the joke. You can't really do a team book any better."

=== Civil War II ===
According to Diamond Comic Distributors, A-Force #8 was the 101st best selling comic book in August 2016.

Professional reviews
	CBR	IGN	Newsarama
Issue	Rating		
8	—N/a	7.0/10	—N/a
9	—N/a	—N/a	—N/a
10	—N/a	—N/a	—N/a

Jeff Lake of IGN gave A-Force #8 a grade of 7.0 out of 10, writing, "With a team consisting of Captain Marvel and Medusa, it was only a matter of time before the events of Civil War II made its way into A-Force. The ensuing tie-in has its share of hits and misses. Kelly Thompson's strong characterization remains intact, the rift of Civil War having its own unique effects on A-Force's tight-knit members. Thompson mines some great stuff from her cast as they argue their positions, with Dazzler really, er, dazzling as an opponent to Carol and Medusa's unwavering conviction. Unfortunately, the same quite can't be said of Nico, who gets the bulk of the issue's focus. While she does get some strong moments—her warm conversation with Misty Knight is an issue highlight—the way in which her story deviates feels entirely too manufactured, with an end that doesn't take a pre-cog to guess. Paulo Siqueira makes his mark as the new series artist, but ultimately this tie-in isn't quite possessing of the same charisma the series is known for."

== In other media ==
=== Film ===
- During the finale battle of the 2019 film Avengers: Endgame, a group of female superheroes (including Captain Marvel, Wanda Maximoff, Pepper Potts, Shuri, Okoye, Wasp, Gamora, Nebula, Mantis and Valkyrie) — that is reminiscent of A-Force — band together in an attempt to usher the Infinity Stones past Thanos and his army to the Quantum Realm.

=== Video games ===
- An A-Force table was released as part of the "Women of Power" DLC pack for Zen Pinball 2 and Pinball FX2.
- A-Force is featured as a playable team in Marvel Strike Force, consisting of Medusa, Carol Danvers (as Ms. Marvel and as Captain Marvel), Spider-Woman, Photon, Jessica Jones, Nico Minoru, Wasp, Moon Girl, Ironheart, and Kahhori. In addition, a playable variation of A-Force called Absolute A-Force consists of only Medusa, Ms. Marvel, Wasp, Moon Girl, Ironheart, and Kahhori.

=== Toys ===
- Hasbro released a box set of six-inch A-Force action figures as a San Diego Comic-Con exclusive under its Marvel Legends line. The set included Lady Loki, Elsa Bloodstone, Monica Rambeau in her Nextwave costume, She-Hulk, Singularity and Lady Sif.

== Collected editions ==
Title	Material collected	Publication date	ISBN
A-Force Vol. 0: Warzones!	A-Force (vol. 1) #1-5	December 1, 2015	978-0785198611
A-Force Vol. 1: Hypertime	A-Force (vol. 2) #1-4 and material from Avengers (vol. 6) #0	July 19, 2016	978-0785196051
A-Force Vol. 2: Rage Against the Dying of the Light	A-Force (vol. 2) #5-10	January 17, 2017	978-0785196068

== See also ==
- List of feminist comic books
- Lady Liberators
