= Ark: The Animated Series =

Animated television series

- Genre: Action-adventure; Drama; Science fantasy
- Created by: Jeremy Stieglitz; Jesse Rapczak
- Based on: Ark: Survival Evolved by Studio Wildcard
- Showrunner: Jay Oliva
- Written by: Marguerite Bennett; Kendall Deacon Davis
- Voices of: Madeleine Madden; Gerard Butler; David Tennant; Michelle Yeoh; Zahn McClarnon; Devery Jacobs; Jeffrey Wright
- Composer: Gareth Coker
- Country of origin: United States
- Original language: English
- No. of seasons: 1
- No. of episodes: 6

Production
- Executive producers: Jeremy Stieglitz; Jesse Rapczak; James Baldanzi; Jay Oliva; Marc Diana; Doug Kennedy; Russell Crowe; Gerard Butler; Alan Siegel; Vin Diesel; Samantha Vincent
- Producer: David Hartman
- Editors: Danielle Wieczorek; Matt Hanchey
- Running time: 24–47 minutes
- Production companies: Lex + Otis; Studio Wildcard

Original release
- Network: Paramount+
- Release: March 21, 2024 – present

Ark: The Animated Series is an American adult animated epic science-fantasy television series based on the video game Ark: Survival Evolved. The first part of the series premiered on Paramount+ on March 21, 2024 with the second part set to premiere in 2026.

== Premise ==
Helena Walker, an Australian paleontologist on 21st-century Earth, becomes a grieving widow after the death of her wife, Victoria. One night, after drowning her sorrows in pills and wine, she wakes up suddenly to find herself in the middle of a vast ocean. Escaping from a large, charging megalodon, she soon washes up ashore on a strange island. Once there, she befriends a wild dodo, only to discover it was being hunted by a human male tribe hunter named Bob. After discovering the two arrived to this world in the same manner, Bob teaches Helena the way of survival.

In this strange new world filled with dinosaurs, strange technology, and warring tribes, Helena will do what it takes to survive and find a way to return to her world, meeting both new allies and new enemies along the way.

== Voice cast and characters ==
=== Main ===
- Helena Walker (voiced by Madeleine Madden) – An Aboriginal Australian paleontologist from the 21st century who recently woke up on the Ark. In her previous life, she has a wife named Victoria. On the Ark, she meets allies along the way, including John, Alasie, and Meiyin Li, the latter who she slowly falls in love with.
- General Gaius Marcellus Nerva (voiced by Gerard Butler) – A brutal despot of Ancient Rome who wants to remake the world in his image.
- Sir Edmund Rockwell (voiced by David Tennant) – The main series antagonist and scientist from the 19th century who is egocentric and has mysterious ambitions. Previously, he betrayed Meiyin Li and sided with General Nerva, dooming her multi-nation alliance.
- Meiyin Li (voiced by Michelle Yeoh) – A Chinese rebel leader from the Yellow Turban Rebellion in 3rd century who is feared throughout the Ark as the "Beast Queen", after attempting to stop General Nerva in a multi-nation alliance. She later becomes friends with Helena Walker and falls in love with her.
- Thunder Comes Charging "John" (voiced by Zahn McClarnon) – A Lakota warrior from the 19th century who heads a community on the Ark. He is the adopted father of Alasie.
- Alasie (voiced by Devery Jacobs) – A peppy Inuk teen from the 17th century who is finding out where she fits in on the Ark.
- Henry Townsend (voiced by Jeffrey Wright) – A spy for the Patriots in the American Revolutionary War and an American watchmaker from the 18th century.

=== Supporting ===
- Bob (voiced by Karl Urban) – A recent arrival to the Ark, was a US Army Ranger who fought in Normandy during Operation Overlord in World War II.
- Victoria Walker (voiced by Elliot Page) – Helena's wife, in her previous life, and a humanitarian aid worker who was very idealistic. At the beginning of the series, she went missing in an unnamed country and was assumed to be dead.
- Deborah Walker (voiced by Deborah Mailman) – The mother of Helena and an activist for Aboriginal Australians in the 21st century. She died before the events of the series.
- Chava (voiced by Juliet Mills) – A member of John's village council and healer with much wisdom.
- The Gladiatrix (voiced by Cissy Jones) – A commander in an army, led by Nerva, who is said to be formidable. Her real name is Octavia.
- Kor the Prophet (voiced by Russell Crowe) – An eccentric character who comes from before recorded history and claims to be a "dino-whisperer".
- Han Li (voiced by Ron Yuan) – A Chinese rebel leader from the 3rd century who is Meiyin's brother.
- Senator Lucius Cassius Virilis (voiced by Malcolm McDowell) – A conniving aristocrat during the reign of Augustus Caesar.
- Queen Sigrid (voiced by Ragga Ragnars) – A Viking warlord from the 10th century who is very bellicose.
- The Captain (voiced by Alan Tudyk) – A buccaneer who makes a hefty profit as he sails around the Ark.
- Santiago (voiced by Vin Diesel) – A Mek pilot from the 24th century and freedom fighter.
- Cassia Virila (voiced by Monica Bellucci)

Additionally, Dee Bradley Baker provides vocalizations for various creatures on the Ark, most notably a dodo and Scary, a Parasaurolophus, who are Helena's animal companions.

== Episodes ==
No.	Title	Directed by	Original release date
1	"Element 1"	Jeremy Stieglitz; Jay Oliva; David Hartman	March 21, 2024
Helena Walker wakes up in the ocean and makes her way to shore. She protects a dodo from a man named Bob, who gives her clothes he has on hand, and she joins him, uncovering that the land is populated by dinosaurs. In a flashback, Helena is a renowned paleontologist who suggests that natural selection is not "the only mechanism" of evolution and is comforted by her wife Victoria. Back in the present, Bob is killed and Helena is soon captured. While knocked out, she thinks back to good times she spent with Victoria. She wakes up and Edmund Rockwell tells her she is in a place he calls "The Ark". After she objects to how humans and creatures are treated, he declares that they are following the principles of survival of the fittest. She almost escapes but gets recaptured, watches a kid get eaten by a T-Rex, then begins to blame herself. She remembers when she heard that her wife is presumed dead. In the present, she is brought to General Gaius Marcellus Nerva for interrogation, noting that he wants to gain all three artifacts he can leave "the Ark." She flees but is injured during her escape. In a flashback, Helena recalls getting depressed following her wife's presumed death, and remains determined to survive no matter what.
2	"Element 2"	Jeremy Stieglitz; Sebastian Montes	March 21, 2024
Helena struggles to evade her pursuers, is saved by a mysterious woman, and thinks back to when she protested for Aborigine rights with her mother before White Australian counterprotesters began fighting with demonstrators. She wakes up and finds herself healed, but soon has to flee, and falls down a hole into a cave, where she is faced with a saber-tooth tiger, where the woman saves her and reveals herself as Meiyin Li. Both women explore the cave, with Meiyin guiding her on skinning an animal, and Meiyin explaining the failed previous attempt to stop Nerva. In another flashback, Helena remembers visiting her mother in the hospital. Meiyin and Helena get inside a chamber thanks to the artifact Helena is carrying, and they realize they are within the nest of a huge tarantula. Helena and Meiyin work together to take down the spider, causing a map of the island to be activated, and revealing a special gun. They leave the cave but Helena urges Meiyin to not kill others, and they come across a band of warriors led by Thunder Comes Charging "John".
3	"Element 3"	Jeremy Stieglitz; David Hartman; Chase Conley	March 21, 2024
John and Meiyin talk, with John demanding that Meiyin leave, until Alasie embraces her, and calls her the "beast queen," convincing her dad, John, to let them stay in the village. As they go back to the village, Helena and Alasie talk while Meiyin attempts to convince John to restart the alliance. Once they get to the village, Henry Townsend shows his dislike for Meiyin returning. Helena finds herself in a makeshift hospital, with people sick with "swamp fever." She later proposes to get the flowers to help heal the people in the village and Meiyin says they need to stop the sickness. In a flashback, John is recruited by Mato to fight against "the invaders" but does not want to join him. In the present, Alasie encourages Helena to get better at using a bow and arrow. John, Alasie, Helena, and Meiyin go to get the eggs of a giant bird, with Helena saved by the others when she is attacked by flying dinosaurs. John is worried when he finds out that Alasie is sick. That night he has a nightmare involving his wife and child from the former world. The next morning, Meiyin gets the egg but is inside the nest, with Alasie saving her and John. Helena uses fluid from the egg to heal Alasie and other villagers. Alasie keeps the bird hatches from the egg. The woman from the camp she was in, earlier, Anika, comes before Helena, and dies in her arms, with Meiyin vowing to liberate it.
4	"Element 4"	Jeremy Stieglitz; Sebastian Montes	March 21, 2024
Helena tearfully mourns Anika and after Meiyin asks her if she will fight to liberate others, even kill if necessary, she agrees. Meiyin, Helena, Alasie, and John look at mining camp they aim to liberate and agree to do so without using reinforcements, even though it is dangerous. Helena tells John to not fight who Alasie is becoming, give her what she needs to grow as a person. Later, Meiyin, Helena, and Alasie work to capture stegosaurus they can use to liberate the mining camp. Using fruits on a tree growing in the environment, they get the dinosaurs to trust them. Meiyin, Helena, John, and Alasie begin their plan, with the Gladiatrix informed, while Meiyin and Alasie get captured. Helena objects to the claims by the Gladiatrix that she is "free" and watches as dilophosaurus attack Alasie, who has the dinosaurs attack each other. Alasie and Helena are chained together and put in a cave, but both soon work to escape. Helena makes her way to the tower but has to fight against Gladiatrix and eventually gets the upper hand. Meiyin comes in with the stegosauruses, later followed by John and fellow warriors. Some time after, Helena is handed a bow and arrows, which she fires at Gladiatrix, who is pushed off the drawbridge by Meiyin atop a t-rex. but she cannot take a shot against an incoming warrior, who escapes because she can't kill him. Meiyin is not happy about this, while Alasie embraces her.
5	"Element 5"	Jeremy Stieglitz; David Hartman	March 21, 2024
Nerva recalls stories he was told as a child about Elysium and places of judgement, and says everything is at risk, threatening Rockwell over the escape of Helena and actions of Meiyin. Rockwell is chocked by Nerva, who then twists his arm. The messenger from the mining camp tells them what happened. Helena challenges Meiyin, telling her she should stop trying to make those in the village into soldiers. Meiyin remembers back to her previous life in ancient China and the training she did with her brother Han Li and grandfather. In a council meeting, Henry accuses Meiyin of being obsessed with killing Nerva. Alasie begins taming some of the dinosaurs. Helena treats Meiyin and asks to be taught her ways, so they begin training, while continuing to treat her. Meiyin remembers when she saw her grandfather killed and later murdered all the perpetrators, later covered all in blood. The enemy force led by Rockwell and Nerva approaches the town, with John using the special gun on them, but they still damage the village and cause many residents to flee. Meiyin and Helena fights Nerva, with Nerva injured by Meiyin. Rockwell fires a tranquilizer dart at her and captures her, to the horror of Helena, with John telling her to stand down.
6	"Element 6"	Jeremy Stieglitz; David Hartman; Jay Oliva	March 21, 2024
Meiyin thinks back to her time in Ancient China, on the battlefield with her brother, and how they were hailed as heroes, with Meiyin pushing for an offensive action and kill them all, while her brother wants a diplomatic resolution. In the present, Meiyin awakes and she refuses to tell Nerva where Helena is while he tries to convince her to join him, which she refuses. It is revealed that Rockwell was the one who betrayed the alliance. Henry, John, Alasie, and Helena try to come up with a plan to save Meiyin, and later agree on a plan. Some time after, John tells Helena that being on the Ark isn't an afterlife because his wife and son aren't there. Late that night, John, Henry, and Helena embark on their mission, with John leaving Alasie a note behind. In a flashback, Meiyin makes her way to the palace, and fells the enemy commander while she is felled by arrows. She awakes bloodied and bruised. John and Helena make their way to the edge of Nerva's palace. She finds Meiyin hung up on a crucifix and frees her. Nerva reveals it was a trap to capture her. John uses arrows to set off explosions across the palace and cut off Rockwell's hand. Alasie wakes up, reads the note, and realizes that John is gone. Helena, Meiyin, and Henry escape, while John is killed while fighting Nerva, injuring him, and killing Nerva's Giganotosaurus. Meiyin and Helena kiss one another, John goes to the afterlife, and the Prophet is informed that Nerva killed John.

== Production ==
In December 2020, the series was announced with a trailer during the 2020 Video Game Awards, along with the cast that included Gerard Butler, David Tennant, Michelle Yeoh, Jeffrey Wright, Zahn McClarnon, Elliot Page, Karl Urban, Malcolm McDowell, Alan Tudyk, Russell Crowe, and Vin Diesel, who will also serve as an executive producer.

The creators of the Ark: Survival Evolved video game, Jeremy Stieglitz and Jesse Rapczak, are the series creators, while Marguerite Bennett and Kendall Deacon Davis are series writers. In 2020 it was announced that Jay Oliva will direct the series, which was set to consist of 14 thirty-minute episodes that develop the game's world, and that two seasons were in production. In June 2022, the series entered post-production, with Monica Bellucci and Dee Bradley Baker added to the voice cast. In December 2022, with the release of a new trailer, it was revealed Butler and Crowe would also be executive producers.

Gareth Coker is the composer for the series. Oliva was also confirmed as showrunner for Ark: The Animated Series, while Kendall Deacon Davis was noted a lead writer of the series.

In an interview with Paste in early April 2024, Stieglitz said that series began to be developed in 2019, and that he worked with co-creator Jesse Rapczak to develop a "budget and an outline for the show they wanted to make" but that it was delayed by the Coronavirus pandemic. Stieglitz said that hand-drawn animation ages better that they made the series 2D so it was not visually confused with the video games and didn't use the same game models, and said that writers Marguerite Bennett and Kendall Deacon Davis ensured that the series was driven by characters than only action, adding that Bennett made, among other aspects, "the character of Helena feel completely authentic", describing her as an "academically trained historian", noting he was a history buff that that cultural consultants were brought in during the episodes "about indigenous cultures...with some of the plot aspects with the flashbacks of those cultures...and the language as well". Stieglitz also said that that Part 2 would have "emotional closure for audiences", including with description of Helena's backstory and stated that the second part would feature Russell Crowe in a bigger role than in Part 1.

In late April 2024, Stieglitz was interviewed by Gamerant and noted the history behind Vin Diesel joining the series cast, the mix of timeliness and wish-casting which played a role in the series casting, the show's creative team getting "who they wanted" for the show's characters, including Michelle Yeoh. Stieglitz also said the show's creative team aimed to make Helena Walker the series "throughline character", themes like war, "love, regret, guilt, [and] trauma", as part of the show since the beginning, including the "theory of mind...[and] what it means to be human".

In December 2025, Stieglitz told MMORPG.com that some of the ideas from the video game were able to be explored "in more detail" and gave characters more "human dimension[s]" by giving them voices, and called the animated series "really fun," with Michelle Yeoh, David Tennant, Madeleine Madden, and Karl Urban reprising their roles in the series. He also said that the series was "wrapping up" post-production for part two, with a likely release in summer 2026, saying it will be larger and larger than part one, along with "Giant Dinosaur Battles...crazier science-fiction elements, and large-canvas epic storytelling."

On June 6, 2026, an exclusive clip of Part 2 was shared on IGN Live!, with Stieglitz saying it will be "awesome" and is "more epic in scope" than part 1, with more Russell Crowe and Vin Diesel, and the IGN Live! host saying it will be on Paramount+ "soon," without giving an exact date.

== Release ==
The show was initially set to be released sometime in 2022, with "14 half-hour episodes", but the second trailer revealed that the series was planned for a release in 2023. In December 2023, IGN wrote that the series was "due out at some point in 2024". The first six episodes were released on Paramount+ on March 21, 2024, in a surprise drop. The remaining seven episodes of the season are set to premiere in 2026, with Paramount+ only licensing the series, rather than co-producing it.

== Reception ==
The series received a mixed reception from critics. Neerja Choudhuri of Midgird Times was more critical, giving the series a rating of 6 out of 10, saying that while is pulls you in at first, with dynamic characters and a vibrant world, it "struggles to maintain its momentum", criticizing it having a lackluster plot, and is an extension of the video game "instead of a series", but has a "glimmer of potential waiting to be realized". Joshua Kristian McCoy of GameRant said that although the series "isn't groundbreaking, it remains compelling through its visual storytelling", called the narrative straightforward but compelling, said it won't be a favorite of everyone but might become "the best introduction to the hit survival game ever produced" and compared it to other adaptations of video games like Castlevania, and live-action adaptions such as Super Mario Bros., Double Dragon, Lara Croft: Tomb Raider, and Assassin's Creed.

Aidan Kelley of Collider described the premiere of the six episodes as a "pleasant surprise" but said that its unexpected drop "misses out on some crucial marketing". Kelley also called the series "technically" a prequel to Ark: Survival Evolved, praised the concept as fascinating, and has amazing presentation, although it isn't perfect. Rafael Motamayor of IGN called the series a combination of Predators and Turok: Dinosaur Hunter, said it was unfortunate it dropped "unceremoniously" on Paramount+ because it adds to a "recent wave of great animated video game adaptations", compared it to Primal by noting that the series "uses its creatures to their maximum potential", with enough "cool elements" to sustain its six-episode arc, has an "impressive cast" which he criticized as "a bit distracting", and called the series a "mightly impressive production". Motamayor also said that the series looks similar to the "video game it adapts", but criticized it for not offering a "fresh...experience" but praised the show's score, fluid action, and an intriguing world which makes "for a thrilling season of TV".

Tara Bennett of Paste said that the series gives non-players and players of Ark: Survival Evolved, a "serialized, hard sci-fi story to dive into, with more episodes on the way later this year". Megan Hemenway of Screen Rant compared the series to Jurassic Park, saying that the series "not only has an amazing collection of dinosaurs, but it also offers deep, human plotlines" while offering glimpses at prehistoric mammals and reptiles, and encouraged fans of Jurassic Park to watch the series, and for the film franchise to be inspired by this series. Danae Stahlnecker of Common Sense Media rated the series 3 out of five, describing it as having "brutal violence in action sci-fi about survival [and] justice," complete with violent deaths, bloody images, mild language, profanity, substance abuse, with characters fighting against warfare, trauma of their pasts, warfare, and torture, and has a "diverse cast of characters from all over the world and different historical eras" with characters finding common ground in their "shared experiences of discrimination and oppression." Stahnecker also noted that characters kiss, "make innuendos about sex", criticized the villains as "a little too one-dimensional" while calling the protagonist Helena is a positive role model and praised the story as fun for those interested in "mystery, dinosaurs, and a bit of time-travel shenanigans."
