= Acayip Hikayeler =

Acayip Hikayeler (Strange Stories) is a fantastic-fiction TV show which is adapted from Galip Tekin's comics. Its first episode was aired on 13 April 2012 on Star TV.

Hayko Cepkin narrates every episode and every episode the cast and plot changes. Every episode begins and ends with Hayko Cepkin's "judgment". In starting judgment Hayko Cepkin implies what is the story about and in ending judgement he simply tells the moral of the story and sometimes gives advice.

The show's 11th and last episode was aired on 22 June 2012 AS "season final" but later Star TV announced this was the final episode and removed from air.

== Cast ==
- Haluk Bilginer, Şevval Sam, Fulden Akyürek, Ayta Sözeri, Hayko Cepkin
- Begüm Akkaya, Altan Erkekli, Ozan Bilen, Hayko Cepkin
- Cem Özer, Erkan Meriç, Hayko Cepkin
- Irmak Ünal, Kaan Urgancıoğlu, Selen Domaç, Hayko Cepkin
- Payidar Tüfekçioğlu, Tamer Karadağlı, Hayko Cepkin
- Levent Üzümcü, Yeşim Büber, Murat Karasu, Hayko Cepkin
- İdil Fırat, Jess Molho, Galip Tekin, Hayko Cepkin
- Sermet Yeşil, Orhan Aydın, Bülent Polat, Billur Kalkavan, Hayko Cepkin
- Ayla Arslancan, Can Kolukısa, Mehtap Anıl, Hayko Cepkin
- Bülent Polat, Ferdi Sancar, Hayko Cepkin
- Özlem Tekin, Levent Güner, Hayko Cepkin
