= M. K. Perker =

Turkish artist

- Born: Mustafa Kutlukhan Perker; 2 November 1972 (age 54) Istanbul, Turkey
- Areas: Artist, cartoonist
- Notable works: Cairo

Mustafa Kutlukhan Perker (born 2 November 1972) is a Turkish artist.

== Career ==
With the ability of producing work in different styles and techniques, he has built a successful career in both editorial illustration and comics. His work has appeared in publications such as The New York Times, The Wall Street Journal, The Washington Post, The New Yorker, Mad Magazine, The Progressive, and others, including Gırgır.

Perker was nominated for an Eisner Award for the monthly series "Air" (written by G. Willow Wilson), published by DC Comics' Vertigo line.

His early work appeared in many Turkish magazines and newspapers, including Gırgır, Fırt, Digil, Avni, Leman, Okuz, Hıbır, Milliyet, Radikal, Sabah, Yeni Binyıl, Star, as well as in the Turkish editions of Esquire, Cosmopolitan, Harpers Bazaar and many more.

Alongside his comic book work and illustrations for American publishers, he currently is writing and illustrating stories of the TV reporter Ece for the leading Turkish daily Hürriyet and short stories for the weekly Turkish humour magazine Penguen.

In 2009, Perker was named one of the 100 most influential Turks by Newsweek magazine.

His comics and illustrations have been recognized with awards by the Society of Illustrators and Print magazine. In 2001, he became the first Turkish member of the New York-based Society of Illustrators.

Perker is one of the 46 illustrators, along with Ralph Steadman, Brad Holland, Marshall Arisman, Milton Glaser and Al Hirschfeld, whose work was featured in the documentary "Four Decades of Illustration", produced by The New York Times to celebrate the 40th anniversary of the newspaper's Op-Ed page.

== Bibliography ==
- Türk Mucizesi (Turkish Miracle) #2 (2014 Pengen)
- Türk Mucizesi (Turkish Miracle) #1 ( 2014 Penguen)
- Todd The Ugliest Kin on Earth Vol.2 (2014 Image)
- Todd #8 (December 2013 Image)
- Todd #7 (November 2013 Image)
- Todd #6 (October 2013 Image)
- Todd #5 (September 2013 Image)
- Todd, The Ugliest Kid on Earth Vol.1 (2013 Image)
- Todd #4 (April 2013- Image)
- Todd #3 ( March 2013 - Image)
- Todd #2 (February 2013 - Image)
- Todd #1 (January 2013 - Image)
- The Unwritten (#31-35 written by Mike Carey, 2011 - 2012 - Vertigo)
- Insomnia Cafe (2010 - Dark Horse)
- Air Vol.IV History of the Future (written by G. Willow Wilson, 2010 - Vertigo)
- Air Vol.III Pure Land (written by G. Willow Wilson, 2010 - Vertigo)
- Air Vol.II Flying Machine (written by G. Willow Wilson, 2009 - Vertigo)
- Air Vol.I Letters from Lost Countries (written by G. Willow Wilson, 2009-Vertigo)
- Cairo (written by G. Willow Wilson, 2007 Vertigo)
- Masal Mafya (Fairy Tale Mafia, 2000 Çınar)
- Türkan Şoray Dudaġı (Turkan Soray Lips, 1997 Çınar)
