= Ramize Erer =

Turkish cartoonist, painter, short story writer and feminist

- Born: 1963 (age 62–63) Kırklareli, Turkey
- Areas: Cartoonist, painter, short story writer
- Awards: "Creative Courage Award of 2017"
- Children: 2

Ramize Erer (born 1963) is a Turkish female cartoonist, painter, short story writer and feminist. She breaks taboos and attacks traditional gender roles with the female characters in her cartoons. She was honored with the Creative Courage Award in 2017.

== Early years ==
Ramize Erer was born in Kırklareli, Turkey in 1963, the fourth of five children of a bookkeeper father and a housewife mother. She spent her childhood at her grandparents' home in Kırklareli, and her adolescence in Istanbul. While there, she spent the summer holidays with her siblings in Kırklareli, where she tried to copy the landscape paintings on the wall of her grandparents' home. Illustrations in the novel Oliver Twist by Charles Dickens impressed Erer. She studied painting at the Mimar Sinan Fine Arts University, and graduated in 1990. During her adolescence, Erer read feminist literature. It helped her feel stronger and understand that she shared similar experiences with other women.

== Cartooning career ==
At the age of 16, she started drawing cartoons for the weekly humor magazine Gırgır, produced by Oğuz Aral a famous Turkish cartoonist. She published her first book Bir Bıyıksız (A Mustache) in 1990. She became known particularly for her cartoon character Kötü Kız (The Bad Girl) created in 1999. After six months at the Turkish daily newspaper Cumhuriyet she was fired, as they found her cartoons obscene. She published cartoons with Kötü Kız for more than ten years in the Turkish daily Radikal, while she created the character Tüpçü (The Propane-bottle Delivery Man) for the magazine Feminist Pazartesi (The Feminist Monday).

When the Muhammad cartoons controversy in Denmark caused a sensation and fierce debates around the world, she took a keen interest in the Cartooning for Peace international traveling exhibition of the United Nations Regional Information Centre, highlighting her position on the dispute over the cartoons saying that "satire needs freedom."

In addition to her work in newspapers, Erer drew cartoons for the humor magazines Hıbır and LeMan. In March 2011, she was one of the founders of the feminist humor magazine Bayan Yani, the only comic in the world designed exclusively by women. She continued to run it from Paris during her exile after threats were made against her in Turkey. Her cartoons about the Gezi Park protests in Istanbul in May 2013 were particularly popular. Over the course of her career, Erer has drawn or illustrated more than ten thousand cartoons and stories.

Erer is married to another cartoonist, and is the mother of a son and a daughter.

== Criticism ==
Erer admits that "her mother gave her something, which other mothers feared to give to their daughters: freedom." She observed her mother's female friends in gatherings at home, and the girls she met in the streets of Istanbul during her high school years. She liked the theme of the song Good Girls Go to Heaven (Bad Girls Go Everywhere), and simply preferred the latter. The inspiration for her sharp-edged cartoons comes from her visits to the beauty parlor in the Cihangir neighborhood of Istanbul, where she lives. The hair salon is a meeting place where gossip is shared.

Belgian-Israeli cartoonist Michel Kichka (born 1954) comments that "she is a mix of the Belgian school and French comics creator Jean-Marc Reiser (1941–1983)." He adds that "her designs inevitably suggest American sitcoms." Her "bad girls" wear hot pants and act freely. Her novelist friend Vivet Kanetti says that "her cartoon characters are very hedonistic, and expose their femininity and body fat without inferiority complexes."

Her Turkish colleague İzel Rozental criticized her cartoons, saying "the background does not change much: two or at most three people are sitting on a sofa or a bed, chatting or talking loudly about sex or their relationships." She adds that "it is sometimes shocking even though we have been familiar with her cartoons for twenty years." Erer says that when she published a cartoon of a masturbating girl, a first in the Turkish press, "all hell broke loose." French cartoonist Georges Wolinski (1934–2015) of Charlie Hebdo said "he admires 'the girls mooning and kidding around with males' of the impertinent cartoonist, who attacks the Turkish community and particularly the relationship between men and women." He emphasized "she is a real sister," and had offered "endless friendship and support" to her and her family.

On the occasion of the publication of her cartoon book in Germany in 2008, the German weekly news magazine Stern wrote "she is one of the few Turkish cartoonists who are invariably critical of the role of women in their country. She breaks taboos and scourges the traditional gender roles with a strong dash of irony and cynicism, addressing adultery and bigamy, homosexuality and bisexuality, often reaching the limits of tolerance." The Stern commented, "for millions of Turkish women, she has become a cult—because she expresses what many Turkish women think, but do not dare, publicly to stand by: for social equality and recognition."

== Painting career ==
In 2007, Erer moved with her 10-year-old son and 3-year-old daughter to Paris, France. She took up painting again, and was invited to take part in a group exhibition at the Kuad Gallery in Istanbul after she attracted the attention of curator Beral Madra. In 2016, she held her first solo exhibition of paintings in the Versus Art Project at the Contemporary Istanbul annual art fair.

== Recognition ==
The Angoulême International Comics Festival honored Erer with the Couilles-au-cul Prize ("Balls-in-the-ass") for the 2017 Creative Courage Award for the emphasis on feminism in her cartoons. At the awards ceremony, she said "I dedicate this award to my mother, who became a feminist without having known Virginia Woolf or Simone de Beauvoir, and who gave me unlimited freedom and the courage to talk about the problems and desires of women and the relationships between them, men and women."

== Works ==
Her notable works include Bir Bıyıksız, Eşi Nadide ("Rare Spouse"), Kötü Kız, Tehlikeli İlişkiler ("Dangerous Relations"), Evlilik ("Marriage") and Kız Hikayeleri ("Girl Stories"). Her album Kötü Kız was translated into German, and the album Evlilik into Italian. Her humor book Chica dü lüks was translated into German by Nilgün Cön und Aşkın-Hayat Doğan and published in Germany in 2008.

- Kız Hikayeleri (in Turkish). Cadde Yayınları. 2013. p. 79. ISBN 978-605-660-302-0.
- Chica dü lüks (in German). Translated by Nilgün Cön. Rotbuch Verlag. 2008. p. 160. ISBN 978-386-789-051-9. Cartoon
- Evlilik (in Turkish). Cadde Yayınları. 2004. p. 96. ISBN 975-632-603-4.
- Tehlikeli İlişkiler (in Turkish). İletişim Yayınları. 2000. p. 116. ISBN 975-470-790-1.
- Kötü Kız 1 (in Turkish). Leman Yayıncılık. 1999. p. 120. ISBN 975-799-127-9. Cartoon
- Eşi Nadide (in Turkish). Parantez Gazetecilik ve Yayıncılık. 1995. ISBN -975-867-942-2.
- Bir Bıyıksız (in Turkish). Joker. 1990. p. 50. ISBN 972-409-604-1.
