= Marguerite Bennett =

American comic book writer

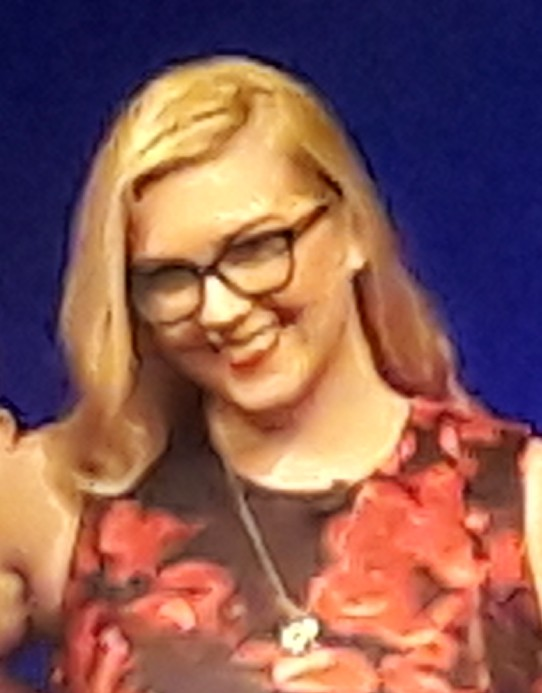
- Born: October 21, 1988 (age 38) Virginia, U.S.
- Area: Writer
- Notable works: DC Comics Bombshells, Batwoman, Angela, Josie and the Pussycats, InSeXts, Animosity
- Awards: GLAAD Media Award nominee 2016, 2017

Marguerite Bennett (born 1988) is an American comic book writer. She has worked on Bombshells, Angela, Josie and the Pussycats, and her creator-owned books InSeXts and Animosity. Her work has been recognized for her depiction of female relationships, and her representation of LGBTQ stories and characters earned nominations for a GLAAD Media Award in 2016 and 2017. She is one of the head writers for Ark: The Animated Series.

== Early life ==
Marguerite Bennett was born October 21, 1988, in Virginia, and graduated Maggie L. Walker Governor's School in 2006, the University of Mary Washington in 2010, and Sarah Lawrence College, completing a two-year MFA writing program, where her work included working on prose, including children's literature and horror and left with a "couple of finished novels and a collection of short stories".

Her first exposure to comics was through Batman: The Animated Series which she saw in daycare, aged around 6, and recalls it had a 1930s feel with Batman looking like a villain who "had been a bad guy and so was now catching other bad guys in order to be a good guy again" and for her, Catwoman, Harley Quinn, and Poison Ivy were her "favorite heroines."

As she grew up, she also drew on characters' depictions in video games and books she obtained through relatives and others and continued to dip in and out of comics while juggling academic study and other commitments as she grew up and moved into college. Bennett states she developed a deep appreciation from an early age of how text and art work together in comics and how they enable storytelling to take risks and developed powerful stories which leave "lasting impressions on readers".

She has stated that Batwoman is her favorite DC character, Quasimodo is her favorite literary character, Belle is her favorite Disney character, and The Fall is her favorite movie.

== Career ==
While at Sarah Lawrence College, she took Scott Snyder's graphic novel writing course during her second semester in 2013. This led to her debut in comics, after being approached by Snyder to ask if she wanted to work with him on a Batman Annual. After completing this, while finishing her MFA and working two jobs, she continued to work with DC and wrote single issue stories for Lobo, Batgirl and Talon in 2013 and 2014. This led to being part of the writing team for the 26-issue weekly Earth 2: World's End, starting at the end of 2014, with Daniel H. Wilson and Mike Johnson, with art by Ardian Syaf, Danny Miki, and Jorge Jimenez.

At Marvel Comics, Bennett completed single stories in the Amazing X-Men Annual, the Death of Wolverine series, and Nightcrawler. Her first ongoing series was Angela: Asgard's Assassin in 2015, followed by two limited series starring the same character, one of which was in the 1602 Universe as part of the "Secret Wars" storyline. Also tying in with that story, Bennett wrote the five-issue limited series Years of Future Past with artist Mike Norton.

Bennett worked with writer G. Willow Wilson and artist Jorge Molina to launch A-Force in 2015, featuring Marvel's first all-female team of Avengers. Bennett said there was no validation or event as to how the women were in charge, but that "they were the best fit for these roles and demands of their world".

Back at DC, Bennett was a vocal fan of the DC Bombshells character designs – and following the positive reaction to the 2014 variant covers used across DC titles, she was approached by editor Jim Chadwick about the possibility of making a comic. The resulting series, DC Comics Bombshells, is set in an alternate history around World War II. Bennett explored traditional genres and mediums of the 1940s such as radio shows and propaganda films to provide a realistic history for the Bombshells franchise. Key to the characters is that none of the women are derived from a male version or counterpart and states that she wanted a cast representing the experiences of all women – "queer characters, women of color, women of different faiths, women of different nations, women of all ages and from all places in life" – but without overt or tokenistic labelling. Acknowledging the importance of these aspects, she explains that "We were able to complete this whole new world that wasn't just one thing because no woman is just one thing. So they each got to have a distinct voice, a distinct personality".

The run has been noted for its female core cast, but also the portrayal of LGBTQ characters and depicting of the nuances of female friendship, family and relationships, rather than stereotypes. She reflects on this, saying "If you write stories that tell folks that queer people can live without shame, they just might grow up believing it". Bombshells will run for 100 "digital first" installments, and be followed by a sequel series in fall 2017, Bombshells United, focusing on the same core cast in an alternative World War II history.

In addition to her work on the character in Bombshells, Bennett wrote the Batwoman character in Detective Comics issues 948 and 949 in 2017 as part of the DC Rebirth relaunch, co-writing with James Tynion IV with art by Steve Epting, followed by a regular Batwoman series. She describes working on the character as a "literal dream come true", describing her as her favourite heroine.

As well as the ongoing Bombshells and Batwoman, Bennett has written one-shot stories of female characters in the DC universe, including Lois Lane – a character she finds has great "audacity in the face of danger" – and a new version of the Joker's Daughter.

Outside of Marvel and DC, Bennett has worked on some well-known characters with other publishers. For Dynamite Comics' 2015 "Sword of Sorrow" event, Bennett wrote a three-issue series featuring Red Sonja and Jungle Girl. She then wrote the first six-issue arc of Red Sonja in 2016, entitled "The Falcon Throne". As part of Archie Comics' New Riverdale relaunch, she wrote the second volume of Josie and the Pussycats with Cameron DeOrdio with artist Audrey Mok. Bennett admires how all versions of those character emphasise their friendship as the "foundation of their journey, music, and story". Following the events in BOOM's Shattered Grid Event in the Mighty Morphin Power Rangers comic, Bennett will be taking over, starting a new series called "Beyond the Grid" featuring a team up of Rangers from different franchises.

In 2024, Bennett served as one of the head writers for Ark: The Animated Series and the writer for Top Cow's Witchblade relaunch. Prior to the release of Ark: The Animated Series, Bennett described herself as the lead writer of the series, shared the musical sequence for characters Helena Walker and Victoria, said that she is heartened by "queer stories of love, conviction, and survival that persist beyond space and time" and said that the project had been her "rock in hard times."

=== Creator-owned work ===
Bennett has also moved into creator-owned comics work. InSeXts was launched by Aftershock Comics in 2015 and saw Bennett collaborating with artist Ariela Kristantina. Building on a story she contributed to Rachel Deering's 2014 anthology In The Dark, Bennett describes it as erotic horror involving a pair of lovers, with insectoid transformations and body horror themes. It is set during Victorian times, a period she states she is preoccupied and fascinated with, albeit without a love of the period. The series is ongoing and has multiple arcs planned.

Bennett's second creator owned work, Animosity, launched in 2016. It explores the effects of animals gaining the intelligence of humans, centered on a young girl and a dog. This ongoing features art and colour by Rafael de Latorre, Juan Doe and Rob Schwager. An associated limited series, Animosity: The Rise started in early 2017 and with art by Juan Doe. A companion series, Animosity: Evolution launched in October 2017 with art by Eric Gapstur.

== Personal life ==
Bennett came out as queer in June 2016, calling herself a "queer comic writer" on social media, and is described elsewhere as such, told Richmond Magazine she "grew up queer." She also told CBR that she had known she was "queer since I was a little kid." and called herself a "big lesbian lead writer" of Ark: The Animated Series on social media, in June 2022. She currently lives in Los Angeles.

== Works ==
=== DC Comics ===
- Batman Annual #2, 2013, with Scott Snyder and Wes Craig
- Lobo: The Last Paycheck #23.2, with Ben Oliver and Cliff Richards
- Superman: Lois Lane one-shot, 2013, with Emmanuella Lupacchino
- Batgirl #25, 2014, with Fernando Pasarin and Jonathan Glapion
- Batgirl #30, 2014, with Robert Gill
- Batman: Joker's Daughter one-shot, 2014, with Meghan Hetrick and Michelle Stewart.
- DC Comics: Bombshells #1–33 / Digital First #1–100, 2015–17, with Laura Braga, Ming Doyle, Marguerite Sauvage, Mirka Andolfo and Matias Bergara
- American Vampire Anthology #2, 2016 (one story)
- Batwoman vol. 3, #1–18, 2017–18, with James Tynion IV, Steve Epting, Jeromy Cox, et al.
- RWBY #1–7, August 2019–20 with Mirka Andolfo (collaboration with Rooster Teeth)

=== Marvel Comics ===
- Nightcrawler #7, 2014, with Chris Claremont, Todd Nauck and Rachelle Rosenberg
- Death of Wolverine: The Logan Legacy #4, 2015, with Juan Doe
- Angela: Asgard's Assassin #1–6, 2014–15, with Kieron Gillen, Stephanie Hans and Phil Jimenez
- 1602: Witch Hunter Angela #1–4 with Neil Gaiman, Kieron Gillen, Kody Chamberlain, Stephanie Hans, Frazer Irving, Irene Koh, Andy Kubert and Marguerite Sauvage
- A-Force #1–6, 2015, with G. Willow Wilson and Jorge Molina
- James Patterson's Max Ride – First Flight #1–5, 2015, with Stephanie Hans
- X-Men: Years of Future Past #1–5, 2015, with Mike Norton
- Angela: Queen of Hel #1–7, 2015–16, with Stephanie Hans and Kim Jacinto

=== Aftershock Comics ===
- InSeXts #1-13, 2016–2017, with Ariela Kristantina, Bryan Valenza and Jessica Kholinne
- Animosity #1-28, 2016–2020, with Rafael de Latorre and Rob Schwager
- Animosity: The Rise #1–3, 2017, with Juan Doe
- Animosity: Evolution #1-10, 2017–2019, with Eric Gapstur and Rob Schwager

=== Archie Comics ===
- Josie and the Pussycats, #1-9, 2016–17, with Cameron DeOrdio and Audrey Mok

=== Dynamite ===
- Swords of Sorrow: Red Sonja & Jungle Girl, #1–3, 2015, with Mirka Andolfo, Elisa Ferrari and Vincenzo Salvo
- Red Sonja, (#1–6), 2016, with Aneke and Diego Galindo

=== Emet ===
- Beauties one-shot, 2015, with Trungles

=== Other publishers ===
- Into The Dark, 2013: contribution to anthology edited by Rachel Deering
- Ghastly Tales, 2016: 3 short horror stories with art by Varga Tomi, published by A Wave Blue World
- Mighty Morphin Power Rangers, 2018-2019: Beyond the Grid arc in issues #31-39, published by Boom! Studios
- The Lot, 2021: #1-4 with art by Renato Guedes, published by BAD IDEA
- M.O.M.: Mother of Madness, 2021: #1-4 co-created and co-written with Emilia Clarke with art by Leila Leiz, published by Image Comics
- Witchblade, 2024: #1-present
