= Ben Caldwell (cartoonist) =

American artist

- Areas: Cartoonist, Artist
- Notable works: Prez, A-Force, Action! Cartooning, The Dare Detectives, All-Action Classics, Wednesday Comics: Wonder Woman

Ben Caldwell is an American artist known for his work in toy design, animation development, children's book illustration, and comic book illustration.

== Early life ==
Ben Caldwell graduated from the Parsons School of Design for Illustration, and Eugene Lang College for Ancient History.

== Career ==
Most of Caldwell's work has been for DC Comics, Marvel Comics, Sterling Books, and ToyBiz (on projects including The Lord of the Rings, Spider-Man, X-Men, World Championship Wrestling, and Harry Potter). His comics cover work includes Justice League Unlimited, Red Sonja, Vampirella, All-Star Batman, John Carter of Mars/Mars Attacks, and Snagglepuss Chronicles. Caldwell's book and comic credits started with Wonder Woman children's books and the initial Star Wars: Clone Wars comic. Later comic work includes many one-shot and supplementary stories such as The Suicide Squad vs The Banana Splits, Superboy: Future's End, Justice League Unlimited, Convergence: Infinity Inc vs Jonah Hex, and random misadventures of Harley Quinn.

Ben Caldwell's most widely known work is the Action! Cartooning series of 'how-to' books and the All-Action Classics comics including Dracula, Tom Sawyer, The Odyssey, and The Wonderful Wizard of Oz for Sterling; script and art for an oversized (and polarizing) Wonder Woman story for DC Comics' Wednesday Comics series; the award-winning 2015 Prez reboot miniseries from DC Comics (w. Mark Russell), a 2016 run on A-Force for Marvel Comics (w. Kelly Thompson), and an as-yet untitled Carrie Kelley graphic novel (w. Frank Miller).

Caldwell began his comics career with the creator-owned and award-losing Dare Detectives comic, which has been reprinted or rebooted at various times. "Dare" was inspired by his Eighth Grade algebra class, as a way to avoid Eighth Grade Algebra.

== Personal life ==
Ben Caldwell lives in Pennsylvania with his family and large collection of Chinese murder mysteries.
