= Alif the Unseen =

2012 novel by G. Willow Wilson

- First edition cover for Alif the Unseen
- Author: G. Willow Wilson
- Genre: Cyberpunk, fantasy
- Publisher: Grove Press
- Publication date: 19 June 2012
- Pages: 320 (First edition)
- ISBN: 978-0802120205

Alif the Unseen is a 2012 cyberpunk fantasy novel by American writer G. Willow Wilson. In the novel, a Middle Eastern hacker named Alif discovers a book of djinn tales which may lead to a new age of quantum computing. The novel won the 2013 World Fantasy Award for Best Novel.

== Plot summary ==
In an unnamed Middle Eastern security state, the hacker Alif discovers that his love interest Intisar is entering an arranged marriage with another man. He creates a computer program, Tin Sari, to identify Intisar’s digital footprint and block her from seeing him online. Alif’s computer is attacked by The Hand, a prince who seeks to identify and imprison dissidents. The Hand is also Intisar's fiancé. Unable to contact Alif online, Intisar sends him a book.

Alif is stalked by secret police, causing him to flee with his neighbor Dina. They seek out a gang leader named Vikram the Vampire for protection. They are rescued by two djinn: Vikram and his sister Azalel, who had been living as Alif and Dina's housecat. Vikram reveals that Intisar’s book, the Alf Yeom, is a collection of djinn tales containing powerful secrets.

They meet a convert who specializes in antique books, and they learn that The Hand is seeking the Alf Yeom. Dina, the convert, Alif, and Vikram seek shelter from the police in a mosque. Alif decodes the Alf Yeom and attempts to create a quantum computer. Dina and the convert escape, Vikram is killed, and Alif is captured and interrogated by The Hand. Months later, he is rescued by NewQuarter01, a prince and hacker. Alif learns that his public arrest has become a cause célèbre for anti-regime activists.

Alif reunites with Dina and the convert in the djinn city of Irem. Vikram died during the escape, but the convert is pregnant with his child; she uses this status to assure the cooperation of Vikram's allies. In the City, The Hand’s attempt to replicate Alif’s quantum computer has failed, leading to massive Internet outages and riots in the streets. Alif uses Tin Sari to counteract the Hand’s control of the City’s infrastructure and restore Internet Access to the City, further assisting the rioters. As Alif's djinn allies battle The Hand's, The Hand is identified and lynched by rioters. Alif and Dina escape.

== Reception ==
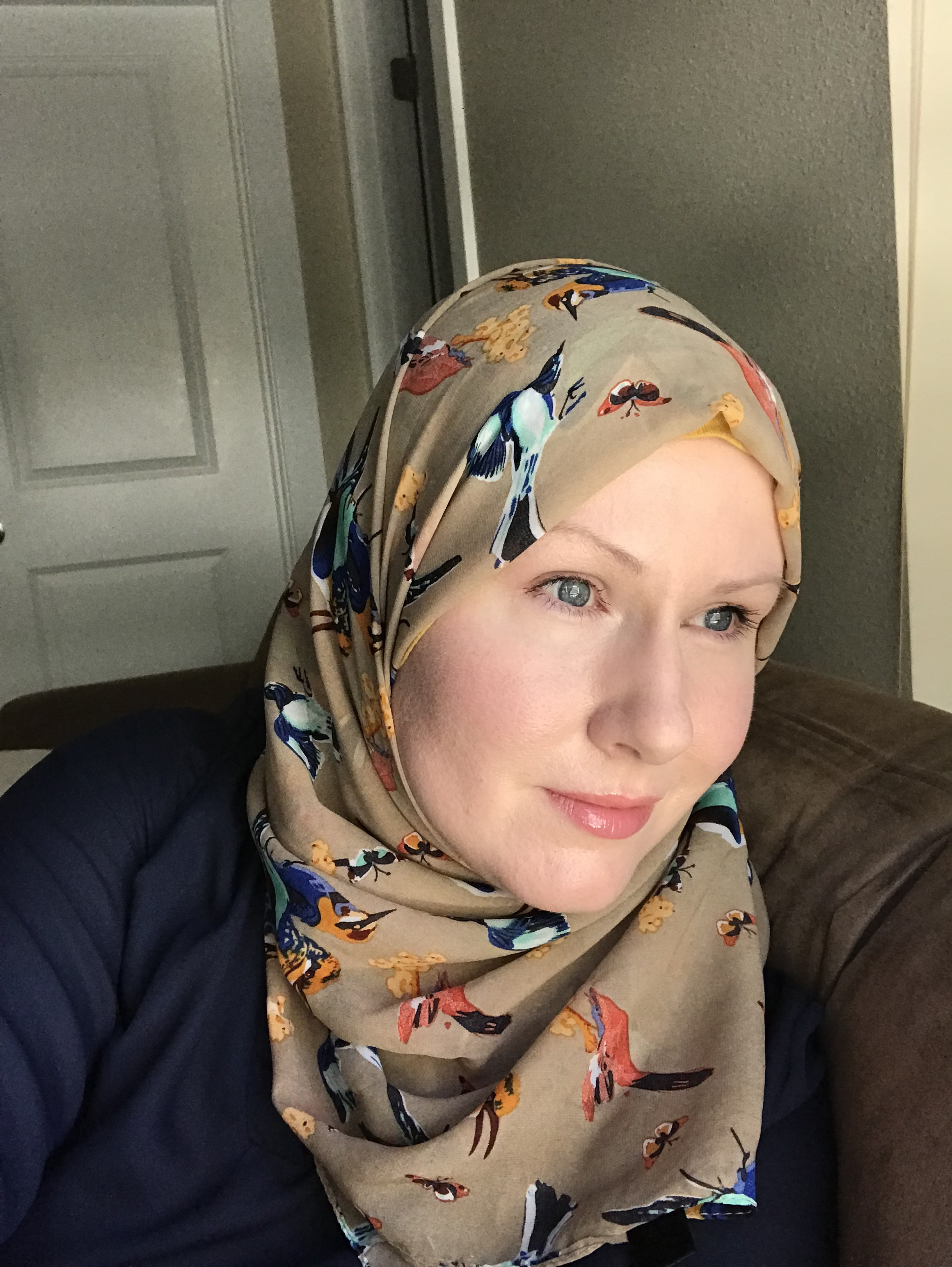
G. Willow Wilson, author of Alif The Unseen.

Alif the Unseen received positive reviews. The New York Times described it as a genre-defying work, with elements of fantasy, dystopian fiction, techno-thriller, and Islamic mysticism. The Times called the novel "a resounding, heterodox alternative" to American fiction which is often safe and provincial. Publishers Weekly praised the juxtaposition of Arab mythology and modern-day computer theory, as well as the novel's exploration of the cultural conflicts between the East and the West. This was echoed by other reviews, which praised the way in which the novel combined the threads of technology and religion. Others praised the novel's handling of relevant societal concerns, as well as Wilson's storytelling and characterization. Salon praised its scope, comparing it positively to the works of Philip Pullman and Neil Gaiman.

Some reviews gave the novel more mixed reviews. The Los Angeles Times found the novel's focus on storytelling and multiple layers of meaning to be compelling, but criticized the novel's romantic elements as "melodramatic and contrived". Kirkus Reviews praised Wilson's ambition but believed the novel to be slow-paced and bloated.

== Awards ==
Year	Award	Category	Result	Ref.
2012	Center for Fiction First Novel Prize	—	Shortlisted	
2012	Goodreads Choice Award	Fantasy	Finalist	
2012	Hammett Prize	—	Finalist	
2013	Campbell Memorial Award	—	Finalist - 3rd place	
2013	Locus Award	Best First Novel	Finalist	
2013	Women's Prize for Fiction	—	Longlisted	
2013	World Fantasy Award	Novel	Won	
