= Cairo (comics) =

- Date: 2007
- Publisher: Vertigo

Creative team
- Writers: G. Willow Wilson
- Artists: M. K. Perker
- Letterers: Travis Lanham
- Editors: Joan Hilty

Original publication
- Date of publication: November 7, 2007
- ISBN: 1-40121-734-6

Cairo is the first graphic novel of G. Willow Wilson with art by M.K. Perker, and published by the Vertigo imprint of DC Comics.

== Synopsis ==
The story is set in contemporary Cairo, and follows six characters as they are drawn into the intrigue surrounding a stolen hookah, a box containing East and the Under-Nile of legend.

== Characters ==
- Ashraf - a hash smuggler.
- Tova - an Israeli Army special forces soldier assigned to the border for her refusal to serve in the occupied territories.
- Shaheed - a Lebanese-American would-be terrorist.
- Shams - a centuries-old djinn, protector of a box containing East.
- Jibreel - a dissident journalist often censored by the government.
- Kate - a somewhat naive American tourist and aspiring journalist.
- Nar - crime lord and magician.
- Iblis - the Devil.
- Ta'abatta Sharran - a spirit inhabiting the city's ruins, appears as a bearded man wrapped in two great snakes. The character is based on the similarly named Meccan poet.
