= G. Willow Wilson =

American writer (born 1982)

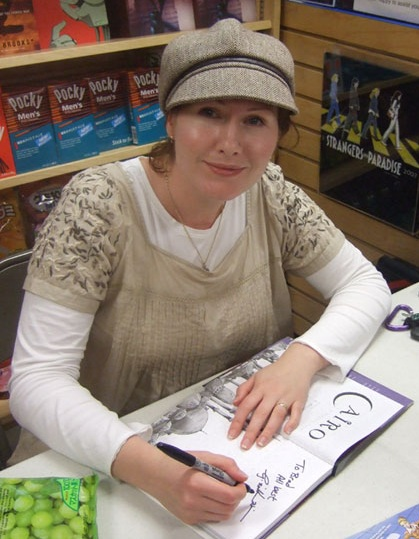
- Wilson in 2019
- Born: Gwendolyn Willow Wilson; August 31, 1982 (age 44) New Jersey, U.S.
- Areas: Writer, Artist
- Notable works: Cairo, Air, Alif the Unseen, Ms. Marvel, Poison Ivy
- Awards: Hugo Award, Eisner Award, World Fantasy Award
- Spouse: Omar
- Children: 2

Gwendolyn Willow Wilson (born August 31, 1982) is an American comics writer, prose author, and essayist. Her work is most often categorized as magical realism.

Wilson's prose works include the novels Alif the Unseen (2012), which won the 2013 World Fantasy Award for "Novel", and The Bird King (2019). She was one of the lead creators in the relaunch of the Ms. Marvel title for Marvel Comics and co-creator of its starring character Kamala Khan, a 16-year-old Muslim superhero. Wilson was the writer on the Ms. Marvel series from February 2014 to February 2019; the first volume won the 2015 Hugo Award for "Best Graphic Story". Since June 2022, Wilson has been the writer on the ongoing Poison Ivy series for DC Comics. Her original comic series include the Invisible Kingdom (2019–2021) for Dark Horse Comics, which won the 2020 Eisner Award for "Best New Series", and The Hunger and the Dusk (2023–2026) for IDW Publishing, which was a finalist for the 2025 Hugo Award for "Best Graphic Story or Comic".

== Early life ==
Wilson was born on August 31, 1982, in Monmouth County, New Jersey, and grew up in Morganville. Wilson lived in the county until she was 12. However, in an interview with Newsrama in 2013, she erroneously said she was born in Morris County and spent the first ten years of her life there. Her parents were atheists who renounced Protestantism in the late 1960s, hence Wilson was not raised in a religious household. Wilson first encountered comics when she read an anti-smoking pamphlet featuring the X-Men in the fifth grade. The characters fascinated her and she began watching the cartoon X-Men every Saturday. Two years later she and her family moved to Boulder, Colorado, where Wilson continued to pursue her interest in comics and other forms of popular culture such as tabletop role-playing games.

=== Converting to Islam ===
After high school, Wilson attended Boston University to pursue a degree in history. During her sophomore year, Wilson began experiencing adrenal problems and the associated discomfort resulted in her studying a number of religions, including Buddhism, Judaism, Christianity, and Islam. After studying Judaism she focused on Islam, which appealed to her because "to become a Muslim is sort of a deal between you and God." The 9/11 terrorist attack set back her religious studies – fearing she had misjudged the religion – but she later resumed her studies.

In 2003, shortly before her graduation, Wilson agreed to teach English in Cairo. During the plane journey, Wilson converted to Islam; stating she "made peace with God. I called him Allah." According to Butterfly Mosque, upon arrival in Cairo, Wilson secretly practiced Islam. After becoming engaged to an Egyptian, she began to practice it more openly.

== Career ==
Wilson's writing career began from her work as a freelance music critic for DigBoston. After moving to Cairo, she contributed articles to the Atlantic Monthly, The New York Times Magazine, and the National Post. She was also a regular contributor to the now-defunct Egyptian opposition weekly Cairo Magazine. Wilson was the first Western journalist to be granted a private interview with Ali Gomaa after his promotion to the position of Grand Mufti of Egypt. Additionally, Wilson released a memoir titled The Butterfly Mosque about life in Egypt during the Mubarak regime, which was named a Seattle Times Best Book of 2010.

=== Cairo, Air, and Alif the Unseen (2007–2013) ===
Her first graphic novel, Cairo, with art by M.K. Perker, was published by Vertigo in 2007, and named one of the best graphic novels of 2007 by Publishers Weekly, The Edmonton Journal/CanWest News, and Comics Worth Reading. The paperback edition of Cairo was named one of Best Graphic Novels for High School Students in 2008 by School Library Journal, and one of 2009's Top Ten Graphic Novels for Teens by the American Library Association.

Her first ongoing comic series, Air, launched by Vertigo in 2008 reunited her with Perker, and was nominated for an Eisner Award for 'Best New Series' of 2009. NPR named Air one of the top comics of 2009, and it also received acclaim from the Fairfield Weekly, Comic Book Resources, Marie Claire, and Library Journal. Other works for DC include fill-in issues #704 and 706 of Superman, the five-issue mini-series Vixen: Return of the Lion, starring the Justice League member Vixen with art by CAFU, and The Outsiders.

Wilson then wrote Mystic (2011), a four-issue miniseries for Marvel Comics with art by David Lopez. Although a CrossGen revival, Willow's Mystic bears little resemblance to its previous incarnation.

Her debut novel Alif the Unseen (Grove/Atlantic) won the 2013 World Fantasy Award for best novel.

=== Kamala Khan, A-Force and Wonder Woman (2014–2019) ===
In 2014, Marvel debuted a new Ms. Marvel series written by Wilson. Wilson had already had a few forays into the comic book industry, having worked on titles such as Superman and Vixen previously. She received an email for an interview with David Gabriel, a senior vice-president at Marvel Entertainment. By that point Wilson was almost finished with her second novel, but she took the time to speak with him. Shortly thereafter she was offered the opportunity to co-create a new version of Ms. Marvel named Kamala Khan alongside Sana Amanat, a director and editor at Marvel Entertainment. The process of crafting Kamala was detailed; both artists wished to create a teenage Muslim American girl. Before settling on her Pakistani heritage the two debated the idea of making her a Somali American girl. While creating Kamala as a character the duo expected negativity, not just from people who were anti-Muslim, but also from Muslims who believed Kamala should be portrayed in a certain way. The crafting also focused on smaller details: Wilson did not believe Kamala should wear a hijab due to a majority of teenage Muslim American girls not wearing them. Despite their initial fears, Kamala was received positively. Some sources described her as easy to relate to, even likening her to a modern-day Peter Parker. Others even viewed Kamala as a symbol for equality and representation among different religions.

Wilson was then brought on to write the 4 issue "The Burning World" arc for the fourth volume of the ongoing X-Men series in 2015; Wilson was the "first female writer to work on X-Men" since the relaunch "with an all-female X-Men roster". Marvel then cancelled its entire publishing line, including both Ms. Marvel and X-Men, for the Secret Wars (2015) event storyline. X-Men was not continued during the post-Secret Wars publishing initiative All-New, All-Different Marvel. In May 2015, Marvel launched the limited series A-Force as part of the Secret Wars (2015) event storyline. The series, co-written by Wilson and Marguerite Bennett and drawn by Jorge Molina, features Marvel's first all-female team of Avengers. In 2016, Wilson returned as co-writer, this time with Kelly Thompson, for the first arc of the second volume of A-Force as part of Marvel's All-New, All-Different Marvel initiative.

A second volume of Ms. Marvel, starring Kamala and written by Wilson, also debuted as part of Marvel's All-New, All-Different Marvel initiative. Ms. Marvel #31—the 50th issue of Ms. Marvel featuring Kamala—was published in June 2018. To mark the occasion, Marvel brought in additional collaborators for the issue: writers Saladin Ahmed, Rainbow Rowell, and Hasan Minhaj, and artists Nico Leon, Bob Quinn, Gustavo Duarte, and Elmo Bondoc. Wilson finished writing the series with issue #38 in February 2019.

In November 2018, Wilson began writing Wonder Woman from DC Comics with issue #58. The character battles Ares in an arc entitled "The Just War." In August 2019, Wilson announced that she was leaving the series; her final issue was #81 in October 2019.

=== The Bird King, Invisible Kingdom and Poison Ivy (2019–present) ===
Wilson's fantasy novel The Bird King was released in March 2019 by Grove Press. The story concerns the flight of Fatima and Hassan, a concubine and mapmaker, respectively, from service to the Emirate of Granada's last sultan. Also in March 2019, Wilson and artist Christian Ward debuted a new creator-owned series titled Invisible Kingdom which was published by Dark Horse's Berger Books imprint. It won the 2020 Eisner Award for Best New Series; Wilson was nominated for Best Writer for her work on both the Invisible Kingdom and Ms. Marvel. The first ten issues were released as individual issues. However, due to the COVID-19 pandemic, Invisible Kingdom switched to an original graphic novel format to finish the series.

Academic David Higgins, in 2020 for the Journal of the Fantastic in the Arts, wrote that "Wilson is one of the preeminent fantastic creators of our contemporary moment", noting that she "is a skilled, accomplished, and award-winning author". In 2020, Wilson wrote the final two issues of The Dreaming from DC Comics, with art by Nick Robles; the series is part of The Sandman Universe. Wilson and Robles then created the 12-issue limited series The Dreaming: Waking Hours.

A miniseries starring Poison Ivy was announced by DC Comics in March 2022 as part of the publisher's "Pride Month" initiative. Poison Ivy was originally intended to be a six-issue miniseries written by Wilson with art by Marcio Takara. The first issue was published in June 2022, with subsequent issues published monthly. In August 2022, DC Comics announced that the miniseries would be extended by an additional six issues, with Atagun Ilhan joining Takara in illustrating the second arc. In February 2023, DC Comics announced that the miniseries would be further expanded into an ongoing series.

In April 2023, IDW announced Wilson and artist Chris Wildgoose as the creators of a new original ongoing series titled The Hunger and the Dusk. Six issues were released between July 2023 and February 2024. The first book of The Hunger and the Dusk was a 2025 Hugo Award finalist for Best Graphic Story or Comic. The Hunger and the Dusk: Book Two began in July 2024. However, in January 2025, IDW announced that "due to unforeseen delays in the book's production", issues #4–6 were canceled as individual print comics and would instead be released in the trade paperback collection for the second book. This collection was released in July 2026; issues #4–6 also received individual digital releases.

In 2025, Wilson became the writer for the new ongoing Black Cat series for Marvel Comics, with art by Gleb Melnikov. She contributed a backup story featuring Static and Ms. Marvel in Batman/Deadpool #1 for DC Comics. Also in 2025, Wilson reunited with artist M.K. Perker to write the graphic novel The Stoneshore Register for Berger Books. Starting in May 2027, Wilson will write the new Captain Marvel ongoing series featuring Carol Danvers with Rachael Stott on art duties. The comic is set after the Avengers: Armageddon crossover event.

== Personal life ==
Since 2007, Wilson has lived in Seattle with her husband, Omar. She has two daughters.

== Awards ==
Year	Work	Award	Category	Result	Ref.
2009	Air (Vertigo/DC)	Eisner Awards	Best New Series	Nominated	
2012	Alif the Unseen	Center for Fiction First Novel Prize		Shortlisted	
2012	Alif the Unseen	Goodreads Choice Award	Fantasy	Nominated	
2012	Alif the Unseen	Hammett Prize	—	Nominated	
2013	Alif the Unseen	John W. Campbell Memorial Award for Best Science Fiction Novel		3rd Place	
2013	Alif the Unseen	Locus Award	Best First Novel	Nominated	
2013	Alif the Unseen	Women's Prize for Fiction	—	Longlisted	
2013	Alif the Unseen	World Fantasy Award	Novel	Won	
2015	—N/a	Harvey Awards	Best Writer	Nominated	
2015	—N/a	Eisner Awards	Best Writer	Nominated	
2015	Ms. Marvel, Volume 1: No Normal	Dwayne McDuffie Award for Diversity in Comics		Finalist	
2015	Ms. Marvel, Volume 1: No Normal	Harvey Awards	Best New Series	Nominated	
2015	Ms. Marvel, Volume 1: No Normal	Hugo Award	Best Graphic Story	Won	
2015	Ms. Marvel, Volume 1: No Normal	Eisner Awards	Best New Series	Nominated	
2016	—N/a	Eisner Awards	Best Writer	Nominated	
2016	Ms. Marvel, Volume 2: Generation Why	British Fantasy Award	Best Comic / Graphic Novel	Nominated	
2016	Ms. Marvel, Volume 2: Generation Why	Dwayne McDuffie Award for Diversity in Comics		Won	
2017	Ms. Marvel, Volume 5: Super Famous	Hugo Award	Best Graphic Story or Comic	Finalist	
2019	Ms. Marvel, Volume 9: Teenage Wasteland	American Book Awards		Won	
2020	The Bird King	Mythopoeic Award	Best Adult Novel	Finalist	
2020	—N/a	Eisner Awards	Best Writer	Nominated	
2020	Invisible Kingdom	Eisner Awards	Best New Series	Won	
2021	Invisible Kingdom, Volume 2: Edge of Everything	Dragon Awards	Best Comic Book	Nominated	
2021	Invisible Kingdom, Volume 2: Edge of Everything	Hugo Award	Best Graphic Story or Comic	Finalist	
2025	The Hunger and the Dusk: Vol. 1	Hugo Award	Best Graphic Story or Comic	Finalist	
2026	The Stoneshore Register	Nebula Award	Best Comics	Finalist	

== Bibliography ==
=== Comics ===
==== AiT/Planet Lar ====
- Negative Burn vol. 2 #7–10, "Aces" (with Shannon Eric Denton and Curtis Square-Briggs) collected in Aces: Curse Of The Red Baron (tpb, 112 pages, 2008 ISBN 1-932051-52-X)

==== Dark Horse Comics/Berger Books ====
- Invisible Kingdom #1–10, graphic novel (with Christian Ward, March 2019–May 2021)
  - Invisible Kingdom: Walking the Path (tpb, 128 pages, October 2019, ISBN 9781506721514) collects #1–5
  - Invisible Kingdom: Edge of Everything (tpb, 128 pages, June 2020, ISBN 9781506714943) collects #6–10
  - Invisible Kingdom: In Other Worlds (tpb, 128 pages, May 2021, ISBN 9781506714943)
- The Stoneshore Register (graphic novel, with M.K. Perker, 128 pages, August 2025, ISBN 9781506748573)

==== DC Comics ====
- Batman Black and White
  - "Metamorphosis" (with Greg Smallwood, in #1, 2020)
- Batman - One Bad Day: Catwoman (2023)
- The Outsiders: Five of a Kind – Metamorpho/Aquaman #1, "Rogue Elements" (with Joshua Middleton, August 2007) collected in Outsiders: Five of a Kind (tpb, 160 pages, 2008, ISBN 1-4012-1672-2)
- Vixen: Return of the Lion (limited series) (October 2008 – February 2009)
  - Vixen: Return of the Lion (tpb, 128 pages, 2009, ISBN 1-4012-2512-8) collects:
    - "Predators" (with CAFU, in #1, 2008)
    - "Prey" (with CAFU, in #2, 2008)
    - "Sanctuary" (with CAFU, in #3, 2008)
    - "Risen" (with CAFU, in #4, 2009)
    - "Idols" (with CAFU, in #5, 2009)
- Superman #704, 706 (with Leandro Oliveira and Amilcar Pinna, 2010) collected in Superman: Grounded Vol. 1 (hc, 168 pages, 2011, ISBN 1-4012-3075-X)
- Wonder Woman #58–72, 74–81 (with Cary Nord, Alejandro Germánico, Emanuela Lupacchino, and Jesús Merino, 2018–2019)
- Poison Ivy (ongoing series) (June 2022–present)
- Batman/Deadpool #1
  - "New Friends in Old Places" (with Denys Cowan, 2025)

===== Vertigo =====
- Cairo (graphic novel, with M.K. Perker, hc, 160 pages, November 2007 ISBN 1-4012-1140-2)
- Air (August 2008 – August 2010)
  - Volume 1: Letters from Lost Countries (tpb, 144 pages, 2009, ISBN 1-4012-2153-X) collects:
    - "Letters from Lost Countries" (with M.K. Perker, in #1–3, 2008)
    - "Masks and Other Memories" (with M.K. Perker, in #4, 2008)
    - "The Engine Room" (with M.K. Perker, in #5, 2008)
  - Volume 2: Flying Machine (tpb, 128 pages, 2009, ISBN 1-4012-2483-0) collects:
    - "The Secret Life of Maps" (with M.K. Perker, in #6, 2009)
    - "The Picture of Zayn al Harrani" (with M.K. Perker, in #7, 2009)
    - "Her Own Devices" (with M.K. Perker, in #8, 2009)
    - "Mass Transit" (with M.K. Perker, in #9, 2009)
    - "Place of the Egrets" (with M.K. Perker, in #10, 2009)
  - Volume 3: Pureland (tpb, 168 pages, 2010, ISBN 1-4012-2706-6) collects:
    - "Sweet as the Tongue" (with M.K. Perker, in #11, 2009)
    - "Pureland" (with M.K. Perker, in #12–14, 2009)
    - "Air Heart" (with M.K. Perker, in #15, 2009)
    - "Infinite Shades" (with M.K. Perker, in #16, 2009)
    - "The Picture of Blythe Alice Cameron" (with M.K. Perker, in #17, 2010)
  - Volume 4: A History of the Future (tpb, 168 pages, 2011, ISBN 1-4012-2983-2) collects:
    - "Reveille" (with M.K. Perker, in #18, 2010)
    - "A History of the Future" (with M.K. Perker, in #19–21, 2010)
    - "Wild Blue Yonder" (with M.K. Perker, in #22, 2010)
    - "Dogfight!" (with M.K. Perker, in #23, 2010)
    - "The Last Horizon" (with M.K. Perker, in #24, 2010)
- The Unexpected, "Dogs" (anthology, with Robbi Rodriguez, October 2011) collected in The Unexpected (tpb, 160 pages, 2013, ISBN 1-4012-4394-0)
- The Dreaming #19–20 (with Nick Robles, March 2020 – April 2020)
- The Dreaming: Waking Hours #1–12 (with Nick Robles, August 2020 – August 2021) collected in The Dreaming: Waking Hours (tpb, 2021, ISBN 978-1-77951-273-4)

==== IDW Publishing ====
- The Hunger and the Dusk #1–6 (with Chris Wildgoose, July 2023 – February 2024) collected in The Hunger and the Dusk Volume 1 (tpb, 2024, ISBN 9798887240824)
- The Hunger and the Dusk: Book Two #1–6 (with Chris Wildgoose, July 2024 – June 2026) collected in The Hunger and the Dusk Volume 2 (tpb, 2026, ISBN 9798887243191) [upcoming]

==== Marvel Comics ====
- Girl Comics vol. 2 #1, "Moritat" (with Ming Doyle, March 2010).
- Women of Marvel #1, "Thrones" (with Peter Nguyen, November 2010)
- Mystic vol. 2 (4-issue limited series, with David López, August–November 2011, collected in The Tenth Apprentice, tpb, 96 pages, 2012, ISBN 0-7851-5608-9)
- Ms. Marvel vol. 3 #1–19 (with Adrian Alphona, February 2014 – October 2015)
  - Volume 1: No Normal (tpb, 120 pages, 2014, ISBN 0-7851-9021-X) collects:
    - "Garden State of Mind" (with Adrian Alphona, in All-New Marvel NOW! Point One #1.NOW, 2014)
    - "Meta Morphosis" (with Adrian Alphona, in #1, 2014)
    - "All Mankind" (with Adrian Alphona, in #2, 2014)
    - "Side Entrance" (with Adrian Alphona, in #3, 2014)
    - "Past Curfew" (with Adrian Alphona, in #4, 2014)
    - "Urban Legend" (with Adrian Alphona, in #5, 2014)
  - Volume 2: Generation Why (tpb, 136 pages, 2015, ISBN 0-7851-9022-8) collects:
    - "Healing Factor" (with Jake Wyatt, in #6–7, 2014)
    - "Generation Why" (with Adrian Alphona, in #8–11, 2014–2015)
  - Volume 3: Crushed (tpb, 112 pages, 2015, ISBN 0-7851-9227-1) collects:
    - "Loki in Love" (with Elmo Bondoc, in #12, 2015)
    - "Crushed" (with Takeshi Miyazawa, in #13–15, 2015)
  - Volume 4: Last Days (tpb, 120 pages, 2015, ISBN 0-7851-9736-2) collects:
    - "Last Days" (with Adrian Alphona, in #16–19, 2015)
- Ms. Marvel vol. 4 #1-38 (November 2015 – April 2019)
  - Volume 5: Super Famous (tpb, 136 pages, 2016, ISBN 0-7851-9611-0) collects:
    - "Super Famous" (with Adrian Alphona and Takeshi Miyazawa, in #1–3, 2015–2016)
    - "Army of One" (with Nico Leon, in #4–6, 2016)
  - Volume 6: Civil War II (tpb, 136 pages, 2016, ISBN 0-7851-9612-9) collects:
    - "The Road to War" (with Adrian Alphona, in #7, 2016)
    - "Civil War II" (with Takeshi Miyazawa and Adrian Alphona, in #8–11, 2016)
    - "The Road to War" (with Mirka Andolfo, in #12, 2016)
  - Volume 7: Damage Per Second (tpb, 136 pages, 2017, ISBN 1-302-90305-5) collects:
    - "Election Day" (with Mirka Andolfo, in #13, 2016)
    - "Damage Per Second" (with Takeshi Miyazawa, in #14–17, 2017)
    - "Meanwhile in Wakanda" (with Francesco Gaston, in #18, 2017)
- X-Men vol. 4 #23–26 (January 2015 – April 2015)
  - Volume 5: The Burning World (tpb, 96 pages, 2015, ISBN 0-7851-9726-5) collects:
    - "The Burning World" (with Roland Boschi, Javi Fernandez, in #23–26, 2015)
- A-Force vol. 1 (5-issue limited series with Marguerite Bennett and Jorge Molina, May–October 2015, collected in Volume 0: Warzones!, tpb, 112 pages, 2015, ISBN 0-7851-9861-X)
- A-Force vol. 2, #1–4 (January–April 2016)
  - Volume 1: Hypertime #1–4, Avengers #0 (with Jorge Molina and Kelly Thompson, tpb, 146 pages, 2016, ISBN 0-7851-9605-6)
- All-New, All-Different Avengers Annual #1, "Internet Randos" (with Mahmud Asrar, August 2016)
- Generations: Ms. Marvel #1 (with Paolo Villanelli, September 2017) collected in Generations (hc, 328 pages, 2017, ISBN 1-302-90847-2)
- Black Cat vol. 3 #1–present (August 2025 – present)

=== Novels ===
- The Butterfly Mosque (memoir, Grove Press, hardcover, June 2010, ISBN 1-84354-828-3; paperback, June 2011, ISBN 0-8021-4533-7)
- Alif the Unseen (Grove/Atlantic, July 2012)
- The Bird King (Grove Press, March 2019), ISBN 978-0-8021-2903-1
