= Oğuz Aral =

Turkish political cartoonist and comics artist

- Born: 1936; Silivri, Istanbul, Turkey
- Died: 26 July 2004 (aged 68); Bodrum, Muğla, Turkey
- Occupation: Cartoonist

Oğuz Aral (1936 – 26 July 2004) was a Turkish political cartoonist and comics artist, known for his satirical style. He was also active as a theatre designer, playwright, ceramist and animator, establishing the first Turkish animation studio.

== Biography ==
Born in Silivri, Istanbul Province, he founded the cartoon magazine Gırgır (Fun) with his brother Tekin Aral, and created such characters as "Avanak Avni" (Avni the Gullible), "Köstebek Hüsnü" (Hüsnü the Mole), "Utanmaz Adam" (the Shameless Man) and "Vites Mahmut" (Mahmut the Gearbox). GırGır was one of the best selling cartoon magazines in Europe in the 1970s with nearly a million copies a week.

Called the "godfather" of Turkish cartoonists, Aral mentored scores of young artists, helping them publish their comics. Gırgır, known to be outstandingly critical of all social ills, was banned after the 1980 military coup, but Oğuz Aral's cartoons still ran in the newspaper Hürriyet until his death in Bodrum.

Oğuz Aral was interred at the Zincirlikuyu Cemetery in Istanbul. He is survived by a son.
