= Gırgır =

Turkish satirical magazine

- Categories: Humor magazines
- Frequency: Weekly
- Founder: Oğuz Aral; Tekin Aral
- Founded: 1972
- First issue: 26 August 1972
- Final issue: 1993
- Country: Turkey
- Language: Turkish

Gırgır (meaning Fun in English) was a weekly Turkish satirical magazine published from 1972 to 1993 in Turkey. It was founded by the brothers Oğuz Aral and Tekin Aral, and in the 1970s it was one of the best selling cartoon magazines in Europe.

== History and profile ==
Gırgır was founded in 1972 by the brothers Oğuz Aral (1936–2004) and Tekin Aral (1941–1999). After having started as a newspaper insert, the magazine's first issue was published on 26 August 1972 with the motto "Life is a hassle, scraping a living, boredom, heartache, fighting with your spouse over money... The solution? Gırgır. Also, Gırgır." Oğuz Aral directed the magazine until 1989, during which time it became Turkey's best-known satirical magazine.

With its sharp political satire cartoons, Gırgır was one of the best selling cartoon magazines in Europe in the 1970s with a circulation of up to 450,000.

Following the military coup on 12 September 1980 Gırgır was temporarily banned due to the publication of a cartoon, which was deemed by the military authorities to be insulting Turkish national identity.

In the mid-1980s a group of contributors left Gırgır and established another humor magazine, Limon. Shortly after that another group from the magazine founded Hibir. In 1989, the magazine was taken over by a large publishing group, and Oğuz Aral and other key staff members left. Following this circulation declined rapidly, and Gırgır finally folded in 1993.

Gırgır had a great impact on the satire of its era, and several later humor magazines followed the example set by the magazine. Many accomplished satirists worked at Gırgır, including Ergün Gündüz, İsmet Çelik, Nuri Kurtcebe, Engin Ergönültaş, İlban Ertem, Necdet Şen, Suat Gönülay, Gürcan Özkan, Cevat Özer, Atilla Atalay, Latif Demirci, Sarkis Paçacı, Hasan Kaçan, Bülent Morgök, Galip Tekin, Mehmet Çağçağ, Metin Üstündağ, Meral Onat, Can Barslan, Uğur Durak, Behiç Pek, Cihan Demirci, Mim Uykusuz, Eda Oral, Gülay Batur, Özden Öğrük, Ramize Erer, Gani Müjde, Bülent Benli, Tuncay Akgün, Birol Bayram, Bülent Arabacıoğlu, Murat Kürüz, M. K. Perker, and İrfan Sayar (who created the Rube-Goldberg-like Zihni Sinir Proceleri for the magazine).

The rights to the name Gırgır are now held by Ertuğrul Akbay, and a magazine under that name was launched in 2008, but with no connection to the original Gırgır.
