= Bahadır Baruter =

Turkish caricaturist

Personal details
- Born: 1963 (age 62–63) Ankara, Turkey
- Occupation: Caricaturist

Bahadır Baruter (born 1963) is a Turkish caricaturist and one of the founders of the L-manyak, Penguen, Lombak cartoon magazines. He is the husband of writer Mine Söğüt.

== Biography ==
After completing his education at Istanbul Male High School, and then Bosphorus University Faculty of Business Administration, he graduated from Mimar Sinan Fine Arts University.

He contributed to Pişmiş Kelle magazine for three months in 1990 and transferred to Limon magazine, in which he started drawing the Lombak Corner. He concurrently worked for Avni magazine for sixth months. After the foundation of Leman magazine, he drew in Leman for 12 years during which he coauthored the Lombak corner with Fatih Solmaz. Lombak corner has become one of the most well-known columns in caricature magazines in Turkey.

In 1996 he founded L-manyak under Leman magazine with Selçuk Erdem. He edited the magazine for the following 5 years. In 1997 he started a company called Komik Şeyler Publishing with Orhan Acar and started compiling caricatures published in L-Manyak in book format. In 2001 he left Leman with many others drawing in L-Manyak and continued working on Lombak under Komik Şeyler Publishing. Soon after he published Kemik magazine, which used to be an addendum to Lombak, as a separate magazine. In 2002 he co-founded Penguen magazine with Metin Üstündağ, Erdil Yaşaroğlu and Selçuk Erdem, who have also left Leman. The publishing company also published Hayvan magazine, which featured literature and caricature albums.

Due to decline in sales and attrition of other caricaturists, Hayvan, Kemik and Lombak magazines were shut down by 2009. Baruter currently draws the Lombak Corner in Penguen magazine.

In 2011, Baruter was put on trial for a caricature he drew in which he renounced God and religion. The Istanbul chief public prosecutor's office charged Baruter with "insulting the religious values adopted by a part of the population" and requested his imprisonment for up to one year.
