= Penguen =

Defunct satirical magazine in Turkey

- Frequency: Weekly
- Total circulation (2010): 70,000
- Founded: 2002
- First issue: 25 September 2002
- Final issue: 18 May 2017
- Company: Pak Publishing House
- Country: Turkey
- Based in: Beyoğlu, Istanbul
- Language: Turkish
- Website: www.penguen.com

Penguen (English: Penguin) was a satirical magazine published in Turkey and distributed also to Northern Cyprus.

== History and profile ==
Penguen was founded in 2002 by Metin Üstündağ, Selçuk Erdem, Erdil Yaşaroğlu and Bahadır Baruter. The first issue was published in September 2002.

In March 2005 Penguen was sued by Turkish Prime Minister Recep Tayyip Erdoğan for several caricatures of him; the magazine was acquitted. In 2011 contributor Bahadır Baruter "faced a one-year prison sentence for a cartoon that [had] the words “There is no God, religion is a lie” on the wall of a mosque."

In May 2012 its offices were the subject of an arson attack. In 2015, two journalists from the magazine were given 11-month prison sentences for comments about Prime Minister Erdoğan. In April 2017 it was announced that Penguen would be closed after four issues. In a statement, journalists cited the decline in people reading magazines, and the lack of "free space" for journalists in Turkey. The last issue of the magazine was published in May 2017.
