= List of The Wicked + The Divine story arcs =

This article is a chronological (by publication) list of story arcs in the contemporary fantasy comic book series The Wicked + The Divine, created by writer Kieron Gillen and artist Jamie McKelvie.

Each issue features a quote by a character, which acts as a title for the chapter. Each story arc consists of five or six issues, which are collected and published in a trade paperback volume. Every two story arcs are collected and republished in a deluxe hardcover book. The series also has one-off issues outside the main story arcs, which are collected in a trade paperback after the series has finished.

== Book One ==
=== The Faust Act ===
In Britain on January 1, 2014, Laura, a young girl and fan of The Pantheon, becomes embroiled in their inner politics after Lucifer takes an interest in her. She teams up with Cassandra, a reporter, to uncover the secrets they hold.

Title	Issue #	Release date
"I want everything you have." - Laura	1	June 18, 2014
The survivors of the 1920s Occurrence (Amaterarsu, Amon-ra, Susanoo, and Minerva) meet at the end of their lifetime and kill each other, with Ananke watching tearfully from a distance. In 2014, after attending a performance by Amaterasu, Laura is invited to meet several members of the Pantheon by Lucifer (who is one of the Pantheon herself). After Lucifer and Laura arrived, they see that Amaterasu is being interviewed by a woman named Cassandra, a skeptic reporter who believes the Pantheon is an elaborate hoax. Another Goddess is introduced: Sakhmet. Assassins attempt to murder the Pantheon members during the interview, but Lucifer kills them in retaliation. At the trial for the committed murder, Lucifer toys with the judge using the ability to kill people with just a click of her fingers. After doing so, the judge's head explodes, but Lucifer insists that she has nothing to do with any of it. First appearance: The 1920s Occurrence, Ananke, Laura, Amaterasu, Lucifer, Cassandra, Sakhmet, Beth
"You spend all your life wishing you were something special. And then you find out you are." - Amaterasu	2	July 16, 2014
A week later, Laura visits Lucifer in prison to ask about Ananke, who Laura overheard Lucifer whisper about to Amaterasu at the trial. She then visits Cassandra and they plot to investigate the Pantheon with the intention of discovering if one of them framed Lucifer. Laura attends a concert in the subway by Pantheon member, The Morrígan. But when she arrives, another member, Baphomet (Baph), appears holding The Morrígan's severed head. First appearance: Baal, Laura's family, Baphomet, The Morrigan
"Killing you is too quick of a thing. Better to destroy you." - The Morrígan	3	August 20, 2014
The head is revealed to be an illusion, and the real Morrígan appears in a different form (named Badb), and the two begin to fight. Laura breaks up the fight, but the two start to fight again, both speaking at once, which envelops Laura's world in darkness. The police arrive and fire a plastic round at Baph. He sets the cop on fire, which eventually kills him. The Morrígan reveals a third form, Annie, who brings the man back to life. Laura is then arrested. Soon after she goes to meet Cassandra, and they discuss what Lucifer had told them about individual members of the Pantheon. As they talk, Pantheon member Baal appears before them. First appearance: Dionysus (pre-transformation)
"When you're as good as I am? This is humble." - Baal	4	September 17, 2014
He takes the pair into the retreat of the Pantheon, Valhalla, where Laura is permitted to meet some of the other members, including Ananke, who acts as a caregiver to The Pantheon. They discuss what to do with Lucifer before Laura goes to visit her. At their meeting, Lucifer breaks out the prison, revealing that she was not in danger at any point. First appearance: The Valkyries (Brunhilde and others), Wōden, Minerva, Owly
"If you exist, you're staring at me." - Tara	5	October 22, 2014
Lucifer goes on a rampage, and the other gods come to control her. Amaterasu tries to reason with her but Baal and Sakhmet attempt to fight her. Laura goes to find The Morrígan, who agrees to help her and whisks Lucifer away from the battle to safety. As Lucifer attempts to leave the safe house, Ananke appears and clicks her fingers, blowing up Lucifer's head. Later on, Laura clicks her fingers to try to light a cigarette like she had seen Lucifer do. Miraculously, the cigarette starts to burn.

=== Fandemonium ===
A month after Lucifer's death, Laura teams up with Inanna to uncover the truth about who framed her, whilst dealing with the emergence of new Gods and her newfound fame as friend of The Pantheon. Meanwhile, Cassandra still seeks her big story about The Pantheon.

Title	Issue #	Release date
"I've got no reason to be afraid anymore." - Inanna	6	December 17, 2014
Laura has been lying low when she is contacted by Inanna, who reveals that they met a year before at Ragnarock (an event about the Pantheon that occurred before the Recurrence) before he was chosen to become Inanna. He tells her that the men who attempted to assassinate Lucifer were fans. Afterwards, Laura decides to come back into the public eye, having become famous in the Pantheon fandom for her public association with Lucifer. First appearance: Inanna, David Blake
"I'm a God, not a saint." - Wōden	7	January 21, 2015
At an event called Fantheon, Laura runs into Cassandra and they discuss the shooting and the Prometheus Gambit, which is a theory that states killing a god will turn you into one. They run into Beth, Cassandra's disgruntled former employee, fired for leaking their location to Baal. Afterwards Laura takes part in a panel about life after being close to a god. At the panel, Kerry, a former member of Wōden's entourage, the Valkyries, where she went by the name Brunhilde, gives personal details about him. Wōden then arrives and asks if she will rejoin the Valkyries, if she reveals all she said was lies. The desperate Kerry agrees but Wōden walks away, terminating the offer, and leaving her broken. Afterwards, Kerry attempts to shoot Wōden (under the illusion that the Prometheus Gambit exists), hoping to become a god if she succeeds. Minerva incapacitates her, but is shocked by her aggression. At the end of Fantheon, Laura runs into Baph who takes her to the Underground for a night of fun. Afterwards The Morrígan invites Laura to a party thrown by Dionysus, who has recently revealed himself. First appearance: Minerva's parents, Brunhilde (as Kerry)
"Being happy for a night. That's not a small thing." - Dionysus	8	February 25, 2015
Laura heads to the party and meets Dionysus. At the party, Laura dances with Sakhmet, and Wōden talks to Cassandra. Laura briefly comes out of the drug-like effect the party has to talk to Baphomet, asking him whether anything special happened before he became a god. She talks to Baal about Brunhilde, who is at a private hospital, and Minerva, who has gone into isolation since the incident. After the party, which goes on for days, Laura tells Dionysus that he's the best, because he makes others happy - but he reveals he isn't happy himself. On her way home, Baal stops and asks if she wants a lift. They then spend the night together. First appearance: Dionysus (post-transformation)
"'Life is the last thing I have boy." - Ananke	9	March 25, 2015
At Valhalla, Ananke is comforting Minerva when Baphomet appears to talk about Laura. Minerva, tired of Baphomet's sarcastic nature, shouts at him about how they are all going to die. Baphomet gets emotional and Ananke comforts him and informs him that the Prometheus Gambit will only work for a death god (to buy more time) - but strictly warns him about punishment for killing a God. Cassandra appears and Baph is dismissed after trying to harm her. Ananke gives Cassandra an interview, beginning with the history of the Pantheon - the Gods come to Earth to fight the Great Darkness in the world. After winning once, the Pantheon had failed for thousands of years. When they win once again, they decide to elect Ananke to guide and protect the Gods. She then reveals that Cassandra is the twelfth god and transforms her into Urðr, who in turn transforms her two assistants (Meredith and Zoe) into Verdandi and Skuld, to make up the Three Norns. First appearance: The Norns (post-transformation)
"If I'm going to hell, you're all coming with me." - Baphomet	10	May 6, 2015
The Morrígan talks to Baphomet, who wants more from his life. Laura is upset about not being the twelfth god, so Inanna takes her to Ragnarock, a massive festival in Hyde Park, and then leaves for his own performance. Laura goes to talk to Urðr, who has worked out who tried to kill Lucifer, but superfan David Blake tells her instead as Urðr isn't seeing anyone. The Norns then begin their Ragnarock performance. Baphomet appears, and attempts to kill them to steal their life but The Morrígan stops him. Ananke threatens to kill Baphomet, but The Morrígan promises to look after him and they escape. The crowd begin to riot, so The Norns perform to calm them down. After her performance, Urðr is upset that the crowd cheered her performance about their inevitable deaths. Laura comforts her and tells her she's happy for her. Baph regrets it but realizes he must kill Inanna at his performance.
"No one gets a happy ending." - Laura	11	June 3, 2015
When Laura returns home, Ananke is waiting for her. Baphomet attacks Inanna at his performance, and they fight, ending in the building exploding and the death of Inanna. Ananke tells Laura that she is a thirteenth member of The Pantheon, Persephone. Ananke tells her to sing, but just before she does, Ananke clicks her fingers, killing Persephone. When Laura's parents discover this, Ananke blows up the house, killing them. First appearance: Laura (as Persephone)

== Book Two ==
=== Commercial Suicide ===
The Pantheon is reeling after the events of the last issue and each attempt to deal with their emotions in their individual ways, whilst also dealing with an inner threat unknown to them all. Each issue in this arc focuses on a different character in the comic and most featured an additional artist: Kate Brown (#12), Tula Lotay (#13), Stephanie Hans (#15), Leila del Duca (#16) and Brandon Graham (#17, except last page which was done by Jamie McKelvie). All issue's back quotes are from another character talking about the featured character. For the issues Jamie McKelvie did not contribute towards, he did an extra page of story resulting in the four Video Game additions.

Title	Featured Characters	Issue #	Release date
"I loved him." - Baal	Inanna & Beth	12	July 5, 2015
A week after Laura's death, Beth, along with her new crew Toni and Robin, are cycling through old footage of Laura, trying to gain something she can use. They head to the wreckage of Inanna's residency, to record footage of the grieving crowd, when Baal appears to pay his respects. Beth uses her previous connection with him to give him a lead on Innana's death, in exchange for an interview. Afterwards they head to find The Morrígan, using the same method Laura had used when Lucifer was in danger. After revealing herself, Baal begins beating The Morrígan, wanting information on Baphomet's whereabouts. Ultimately, Wōden appears and breaks up the fight, taking the two Gods with him. Beth is left with her exclusive and Baphomet appears in the shadows, choosing to cover his own back rather than help The Morrígan. First appearance: Toni, Robin Video Games #1: Inanna gives an interview; he's tried to live his life without regrets but is still troubled by the results. The only way out of that is to not care like Sakhmet; but he'd rather die then not care, so having regrets is the one thing he doesn't regret.
"Looking good, girl." - Wōden	Tara	13	August 5, 2015
Tara is performing a concert and the crowd loves her. When she tries to play an original song, the crowd boos and turns violent against her until she starts performing again. She starts narrating about her life, from where catcalls began at the age of eleven and threats of rape occurred. Adopting a mask to hide her face, she begins gigging in secret to small crowds, which is where Ananke finds her and changes her into Tara. In the present, Tara makes a rare visit to talk to the other Gods and Ananke. They argue about what to do with The Morrígan and the footage that Beth has obtained. Meeting with Ananke later on, she is confused about who she really is and upset about the bullying the world is inflicting on her. She performs one last song, where Ananke then executes her. Tara's narration is revealed to be her suicide note that Ananke promptly burns. Online, the abuse turns to appreciation upon her death. First appearance: Tara Video Games #2: At a premiere for a superhero film, a reporter asks invasive questions about how much surgery Tara must have had to get her physique. Tara walks away without answering and the reporter calls her Fucking Tara.
"You're not stupid, are you? Just evil." - Cassandra	Wōden	14	September 9, 2015
Wōden is telling someone his side of the story so far. He starts by explaining that when Kerry tried to shoot him, a part of him wanted to die. Afterwards, he went to inform Ananke what had happened, and she sent him to Dionysus' party to arrange Cassandra's interview with her. He then reveals that Ananke killed the judge at Lucifer's trial, which he kept quiet about. He tells of all the things he had done for Ananke; build a hideout for the Gods, organize Fandemonium and Ragnarok and even cleaned up the murdered body when Ananke blew up Laura's house. Ananke has been making Wōden do her work for ages and he is afraid that more will die soon. The figure he is speaking to is revealed to be another masked figure, and Wōden promises that he will protect him.
"You're doing this wrong." - Urðr	Amaterasu	15	October 14, 2015
Amaterasu recalls her past where a bully attempts to steal a toy version of her namesake and she bites him for it. Whilst praying at the Meiji Shrine in Tokyo, she receives a call and returns to London to find Tara dead, assumed to be another murder by Baphomet. Dionysus, Baal, Wōden and Sakhmet argue with each other and all storm out, leaving Amaterasu alone with the body. Heading down the hall, she goes into Kerry's room, where she is still recovering from her injuries. Minerva is with her, along with Beth's crew. Minerva is still feeling guilty over what she did to Kerry but is also concerned that everything that is happening doesn't add up. The Norns arrive and chastise Beth for being there, who had been invited by Wōden to document the Pantheon. When Amaterasu tries to keep Urðr from waking Kerry, Urðr calls her out for appropriating culture. The two argue about Japanese culture which culminates in Amaterasu Stepping The Norns to Hiroshima. During their argument, Amaterasu accidentally creates a very offensive image of a sun over Hiroshima. Amaterasu realizes her mistake and explains to Urðr that she didn't choose this image. Returning to the shrine, she prays for her fellow Gods and the ones who have died. Video Games #3: Amaterasu shows Brunhilde (Kerry) the ring from Wōden that he told her belonged to the 1920s Amaterasu. Brunhilde is surprised Wōden gave it freely, saying the rumors about him are just the half of it; he's an insecure pervert that all the Valkyries hate. Noticing a fan streaming their conversation, Brunhilde moves to attack, stating the fan doesn't know what they've done-the stream disconnects.
"You were always best at the game." - Cameron	The Morrígan & Baphomet	16	November 11, 2015
The Morrígan is being held by The Gods, who seek Baphomet's location. She thinks back to her pre-transformation days, where she was Marian and Baphomet was Cameron, her best friend who she eventually forms a relationship with. After the deaths of his parents, Cameron goes on a downward spiral, eventually leading him to sleep with someone else. Marian storms off into a graveyard, where she is transformed into The Morrígan. One night after a performance, Cameron waits for her. Realising she still loves him, she manages to convince Ananke to change Cameron into Baphomet. She promises to lead the Gods to Baphomet but doesn't know exactly where he is. Minerva gives her lunch, where a mini Baphomet emerges from a pentagram of ketchup, promising to explain everything. Video Games #4: After the performance that night, a fan (Umar-the future Dionysus), and his two friends try recording The Morrigan as she leaves. The video instead shows an image of someone dying in a hospital room, leaving the three confused.
"Are you ready?" - Wōden	Sakhmet	17	December 16, 2015
Sakhmet is woken up after a night of partying and debauchery by Eir. After light training with Baal, she performs a concert for her fans. Whilst giving an interview, she becomes agitated when she isn't given a drink and leaves. In her sober state, she kills and eats her father. Wōden and two Valkyries show up to bring her home, by offering her alcohol. Whilst drunkenly guarding The Morrígan, she passes out, while The Morrigan says she knows how she will escape. Across town, a bar is being booked for a concert under the name of Persephone. First appearance: Eir

=== Rising Action ===
A ghost from The Pantheon's past has supposedly come back to haunt them and a civil war has divided the Gods onto two sides.

Title	Issue #	Release date
"Tonight, I'm going to kill." - Persephone	18	April 6, 2016
Nearly two months after her supposed death, Laura, now going as Persephone, gets ready to perform her concert. Persephone starts her concert and the public begins to post about her on social media. Wōden is busy making a birthday present to Minerva from Ananke when they are alerted to Persephone's presence, who Ananke labels as 'The Destroyer'. Ananke goes with Wōden, his Valkyries and Sakhmet and leaves Baal to guard Valhalla. Baphomet attacks and knocks him out, hoping to rescue The Morrígan. The others arrive at Persephone's gig and start to fight. Baphomet finds Minerva has already freed The Morrígan and they all plan to leave together, after fetching Minerva's parents. The others realise Persephone is a distraction and rush back to Valhalla. Baphomet, Minerva and The Morrígan find themselves cornered by the others when Persephone arrives to help them escape. The Morrígan announces now is the time to wage war. It is then revealed one month ago Persephone and Baphomet slept together.
"Do you guys believe her?" - Dionysus	19	May 4, 2016
Dionysus is holding a party when he suddenly lurches over in pain and leaves, upsetting his guests. Baphomet grabs him and takes him to meet the others in the Underground, where they persuade him to join their fight against Ananke. At Valhalla, Ananke persuades the other Gods (Sakhmet, Baal, Amaterasu and Wōden) that they need to kill Persephone and rescue Minerva. Minerva's pet mechanical owl, Owly, finds her but is actually being used as a conduit for Baal. Sakhmet and Amaterasu also join him to fight but The Morrígan summons a horde of ravens to attack them. During the fight Amaterasu manages to grab Minerva and escape with her by Stepping, with the others following her. Persephone picks up Owly and they discover a recording of Ananke saying she is going to sacrifice Minerva.
"We do not play God." - Urðr	20	June 8, 2016
Persephone arranges a meeting with The Norns at her former home to show Urðr how she came to be. It is revealed that Baphomet never killed Inanna and instead teams up with him to fight Ananke. When Ananke tries to kill Persephone after her transformation, the duo save her but Ananke manages to kill Inanna before they can escape. Persephone lies in mourning for months with only Baph for company, where they then end up sleeping together. He tells her the story of him being recruited into The Pantheon, where he is actually revealed to be the God Nergal. Urðr is shocked by what she has heard and demands Persephone go to the authorities with the proof. Instead Persephone and the underworld Gods wish to storm Valhalla to rescue Minerva and when Urðr tries to stop her, she is revealed as a projection by Owly and the siege of Valhalla has already begun. First appearance: Baphomet (as Nergal)
"Let's go straight to the live show." - Wōden	21	July 12, 2016
Minerva has been returned to Valhalla unconscious, but Persephone, Nergal, Dionysus and The Morrígan show up to get her back, bringing with them the guests of Dionysus's latest party to fight with them. Baal begins to fight them when the Valkyries appear to help. Minerva wakes up and begs Amaterasu and her parents to get her out of Valhalla. At that moment Ananke appears in the room and murders Minerva's parents and attempts to kill Amaterasu, who manages to escape at the last second by Stepping away. Beth and her camera crew had been filming in the room and can't believe they were spared. Ananke attempts to take Minerva to her machine so Nergal tries to stop her, but she manages to fight him off and throw him out of Valhalla. Wōden objects to the sacrifice but Ananke sends him away to deal with the attack, where he summons a massive leviathan composed of his Valkyries and controlled by a mechanical golem.
"What are we going to do?" - Minerva	22	August 17, 2016
Amaterasu fetches The Norns and brings them to Valhalla, where Persephone, Nergal, Dionysus and The Morrígan are still in battle with the Valkyrie Leviathan, Wōden, Sakhmet and Baal. Wōden has a change of heart and decides to help his enemies, giving Dionysus the information to destroy the mechanical golem and the Leviathan. Urðr manages to make the Gods agree (except Sakhmet who is promptly knocked out) to put aside their differences to save Minerva. Combined with the efforts of the other Gods, Persephone manages to fight and capture Ananke in her vines. Ananke reveals that four Gods must die for the Great Darkness to be held back and accuses Persephone of being the one to destroy them all. The other Gods decide to spare Ananke and put her in the cage that once held The Morrígan, but Persephone, bitter about Ananke killing her sister Jenny without even realising, kills her. The Gods decide to spin the murder as self-defence and contemplate a world where they can do whatever they want.

== Book Three ==
=== Imperial Phase (Part 1) ===
In the wake of the biggest shock in Pantheon history, the Gods now have no restraints in life. The first issue portrays an in-universe magazine featuring interviews with the Gods written by real journalists.

Title	Issue #	Release date
Pantheon Monthly: November 2014	23	November 2, 2016
A look into the world of The Pantheon following the death of Ananke. The Morrígan gives her first ever interview with Leigh Alexander (journalist), revealing her side of the story. Dorian Lynskey interviews Baal, revealing insights into the Pantheon's current life such as himself, Persephone and Minerva moving into 3 floors of The Shard, how he has taken de facto leadership of The Pantheon, taken responsibly of Minerva since her parents' death and how he is now dating Persephone. Wōden and two of his Valkyries are interviewed by Laurie Penny; he shows her his workshop and talks about his relationship with Ananke. A posthumous interview with Lucifer by Mary HK Choi from before her death hints at Baal and Inanna's hidden relationship and ends with the two of them meeting the newly created Amaterasu. Ezekiel Kweku talks to Amaterasu in San Francisco, talking about her relationship with Lucifer and what happened on the day Ananke killed Minerva's parents. Illustrated by Kevin Wada
"I wanted everything you had." - Persephone	24	December 7, 2016
On New Year's Day 2015, The Pantheon host a party at their new base at The Shard to celebrate. Persephone is in an open relationship with Baal, so kisses Amaterasu at midnight and sleeps with Sakhmet. In the morning. Minerva voices her concerns about Persephone's and Baal's relationship, thinking she is going to end up hurting him worse than Inanna did and that she needs to be kinder. Journeying to the crumbling Valhalla, Persephone meets with the Norns who are trying to uncover what exactly Ananke's machine planned to do to Minerva. Wōden arrives and asks why he's been summoned by Persephone and Urðr, who want him to answer for his role in Ananke's crimes. He reveals security footage of Ananke's murder to blackmail the pair into sparing him, but Persephone ignores it and goes in for the kill.
"Anger helps." - Minerva	25	January 4, 2017
Urðr manages to stop Persephone killing Wōden and the two appear to strike a deal, until Persephone pulls Wōden into the underground and tortures him until he complies with her demands to release the Valkyries from their service and to work with Urðr. Urðr chastises Persephone over text about being willing to kill anyone who gets in her way. Later Persephone, Baal and Minerva are watching an old Ananke interview, with Minerva feeding off the anger from it and wishing she could solve the puzzle that Ananke was. Baal is confident in what Ananke told them about the Great Darkness but Persephone has doubts. An interview with Amaterasu sends Minerva into a rage for leaving her to die but as she is venting, the windows behind her suddenly smash and she is dragged out by a humanoid shape made of darkness, which Baal believes is the Great Darkness Ananke talked about.
"You're lying. You know more than that," - Urðr	26	February 9, 2017
As Baal battles the Great Darkness, Persephone calls on Amaterasu who teleports her to Baal's family home where the Darkness is also attacking. Persephone's powers have no impact on the Darkness and seem to feed it; but the others manage to stop it. The next day, Baal summons all of the Pantheon to Valhalla to discuss the Darkness. He reveals that Ananke told him about the Darkness when he first became Baal and that Amaterasu also knew because she was also a sky god. The Pantheon decide to vote on what to do: fight the Darkness head on, study the problem or leave it alone to anarchy. Baal, Minerva and Amaterasu vote to fight, Wōden, Dionysus and Urðr vote to study and Sakhmet, The Morrígan and Nergal choose anarchy. Persephone is left with the deciding vote and chooses anarchy, much to the chagrin of Baal and Urðr. Persephone leaves before she can drag Baal down with her and purposely crashes her motorcycle before heading to a gig.
"This is a bad idea." - Baphomet	27	March 8, 2017
At The Shard, Minerva rips the last months of the year 2015 off her calendar and marks her death date along will Baal's. In the toilet she is once again attacked by the Great Darkness which Baal saves her from. He then mysteriously teleports away, returns and marks May the 1st on Minerva's calendar as the day the Great Darkness arrives. From January to February the various members of the Pantheon go about their lives: Persephone enjoys time with Sakhmet while occasionally sleeping with Nergal, who has created a holographic version of her family to get closure. Baal meets with the Prime Minister about their situation and continues to work with Urðr to try and combat the Darkness. Amaterasu starts her own religion called ShinTwo, Minerva starts drinking, Wōden moves on from his Asian fetish onto a type more like Persephone. The Morrígan stays in the underground, maintaining her dominant relationship with Nergal. Dionysus works with both Wōden and Urðr to try and activate her perception to other powers through a series of Dio's parties. In the end it works but she still finds it pointless. At the beginning of March, Urðr invites David Blake to Valhalla to offer him a role being a community liaison for the Pantheon. He warns Urðr that in the second year of the Recurrence the Gods become more violent and less able to be controlled. The other Norns, Verdandi and Skuld, ask David if they will die with the other official Gods that were transformed by Ananke, but he has no answer.
"Isn't this great?" - Amaterasu	28	April 12, 2017
A few days after meeting with the Norns, David Blake returns home and finds them in his house, where Urðr is surprised to find he has a child. David explains his child, Jon, is at a boarding school and he isn't in contact anymore. At Amaterasu's temple for her religion, Dio is hosting a party with some of the Gods in attendance. Urðr reveals that she knows that Wōden is secretly David's son Jon and complains to him that Amaterasu's new religion is getting out of hand. Urðr confronts Amaterasu about the temple but backs off when Ammy threatens her. Nergal shows up at the party but runs away when he sees Persephone, who he's been ignoring. Persephone runs after him trying to get an explanation but accidentally knocks his sunglasses off, revealing bruises and scratches where The Morrígan has been abusing him. Dio goes after him which abruptly ends the party, but Sakhmet, Amaterasu and the partygoers remain for an orgy. In the middle of complaining about Urðr, Amaterasu accidentally reveals to Sakhmet that Persephone killed Ananke, who up until now was the only God who did not know. Sakhmet flies into a rage and Amaterasu escapes, while Sakhmet kills everyone at the orgy. In a flashback to six months ago, as Ananke writes a suicide note and prepared to kill Minerva, her suicide note vanishes in a flash of magic.

=== Imperial Phase (Part 2) ===
In the wake of a very public scandal, the Pantheon members prepare to fight one of their own and plan a party at the same time.

Title	Issue #	Release date
"Don't believe in miracles." - Sakhmet	29	July 5, 2017
Persephone wakes up after sleeping with a person dressed up as Lucifer, who tells her about Sakhmet's massacre. She is interviewed by the police then met by Amaterasu later, who takes her to see Baal. Baal and Mini are working on her fighting skills at Valhalla when the pair arrive. Persephone and Baal go to see The Norns, Dio and Wōden but nobody knows where Sakhmet is. Baal sends The Norns, Dio and Persephone to go rally The Morrígan and Nergal to help them fight Sakhmet if need be. The Morrígan refuses an audience until Persephone leaves and then reluctantly agrees to help and the others leave except Dio, who confronts her about her abuse and wishes to see Nergal. Persephone admits to Urðr that Sakhmet was basically the closest person to her. Persephone goes on an all-night bender where everyone offers their sympathy. Returning home with a man, she hears voices from her home, where she finds Sakhmet waiting for her.
"Beware the honest." - The Morrígan	30	August 9, 2017
Urðr and Wōden prepare Valhalla for the massive event taking place there tomorrow night. In the underground, Dio waits for Nergal to appear, being visited by each of The Morrígan's forms as he waits. Wōden equips Baal, Minerva and Amaterasu's things with cameras so that they can all be tracked easily. They track down a Sakhmet sighting but are disappointed to find it is only a fan dressed as her. Nergal finally shows himself to Dio and the pair chat about his relationship with The Morrígan and Dio's feelings for Urðr. At the end, Dio gives Nergal a phone to contact them on if he needs help. The Morrígan visits Persephone in her home and threatens her to stay away from the other Gods, at risk of death. Sakhmet is still hiding out at Persephone's and the pair kiss.
"That's your problem." - Wōden	31	September 6, 2017
Persephone calls Baal and tells him that Sakhmet has gone to the British Museum. At Valhalla, Dio is visibly struggling after his ordeal in the underground but still decides to perform, because he can't stand to let people down. Dio activates his Hivemind to the visiting audience which envelops everyone. Wōden knocks out The Norns and takes over the Hivemind, taking control of everyone and knocking Dio out in the meantime. Amaterasu volunteers to talk to Sakhmet and try to get her to calm down and turn herself in. While initially compliant, Sakhmet turns on Amaterasu after Ammy says they are family and slashes her throat, killing her before leaving.
"One more time." - Dionysus	32	October 11, 2017
Dio manages to recover from fainting and moves to stop Woden. The Valkyries fight against him and he is defeated once again, but the Norns awaken and manage to stop Wōden, who manages to escape. Sakhmet returns to Persephone's after killing Amaterasu but Baal arrives to capture her. Minerva texts The Morrígan to help them capture Sakhmet but she refuses as she's jealous of Persephone. The two of them fight and Persephone is dragged into it, but she can't bring herself to stop Sakhmet. As Sakhmet is just about to kill Persephone, Minerva arrives and kills Sakhmet. Later on, Persephone meets with Urðr, who tells her that Dio is in the hospital; brain dead. The two get into an argument which ends in them finding a secret door in Valhalla.
.	33	November 15, 2017
The secret room is actually a prison for the second masked figure and true god Mimir; Jon Blake. "Wōden" has actually been David Blake the entire time, working with Ananke in exchange for siphoning off his son's powers and enjoy godhood for himself but having his own plan. David needs Urðr and considers letting Persephone live if Mimir tells him what the machine does. Persephone blames herself for her family's deaths and Urðr comforts her. Mimir tells them the machines does nothing; after his head is accidentally pulled off. Meanwhile, Minerva laments the unsuitable half-head of Sakhmet, needing a proper fourth to ward off the Great Darkness as she is Ananke; revealed to have the still living heads of Lucifer, Inanna and Tara.

== Book Four ==
=== Mothering Invention ===
Taking us back through the ages of the Pantheon the first begins around 6,000 years ago when this has never happened before.

Title	Issue #	Release date
"Forever makes liars of us all."	34	March 7, 2018
Around six-thousand years ago an old woman sends her grandson away, as her sister Ananke arrives to kill her. Ananke is carrying a sack of heads. Though Ananke has corrupted what was done to extend her life forever the sisters make rules for how this must be done: Ananke is maiden and crone while the sister is mother; there must be 12 gods who must die at the end else they be consumed by godhood; Ananke chooses which gods will take the children and will need four heads each time; though the sister's god must always be called as the last in each cycle. Ananke kills her sister as the sister warns it will end badly for Ananke once the children catch on. In the present, Persephone tells the reader she has a secret while wanting others to call her Laura again. Mimir tells them his father knew Ananke killed the judge and has the other three heads; and that Wōden sent the snipers after Lucifer in the first place. They consider Ananke may have done something to Minerva. Verdandi and Skuld find themselves human again and discover the cage. Wōden is distracted, using footage from Baal's camera to compare Sakhmet's death with Lucifer's to realise Minerva is using Ananke's decapitation technique.
"Necessity." - Minerva	35	April 4, 2018
In 1923, Minerva shields herself from the suicide pact and then takes Susanoo's head as the 4th to complete the ritual with a Persephone, The Morrigan and Set. Ananke expresses reluctance to die even though Minerva says they are the same and live on through her, killing Ananke and completing the ritual. In the present, Wōden confronts Minerva who says Ananke promised her a way to live and taught her how to transfer the heads, though she cannot find them, which Wōden wants for his own purposes. Laura and The Norns escape though Wōden grabs Mimir's head. As Urðr prepares to tell people what happened; over text Minerva says Wōden attacked her and that she thinks Baal has his own secret room she could never get into. Once Minerva tells Baal that Persephone has found a room, he teleports there in a panic. Laura finds that he is actually Baal Hammon as Urðr first suspected; the room contains remains from child sacrifices. Baal displays powers of fire, as he reminds Laura he always said everyone else should be afraid of him.
"It's all I've ever wanted."	36	May 16, 2018
Opening pages show Ananke awaken and kill the first Persephone in The Upper Nile, during 3862 B.C. Every Pantheon throughout history is shown at this moment. The majority of the Persephones are killed, some are embraced, a few escape or fight back, and a couple even manage to kill Ananke. Even fewer appear to be male Persephones. Two appear to be killed by Minerva. In the present, Baal explains that Ananke told him he must kill a child whenever the Great Darkness comes to stave it off; else it will destroy the world, starting with those closest to him. Ananke had Wōden make the lightning bolt necklace so nobody would know which Baal he truly was. He refused to kill kids but then his father was killed. He's killed five children, including the day he teleported away from Minerva. Each child sacrifice has driven the Great Darkness away for four months. He expects it to return in early May based on the date of the last sacrifice. He despises the murders but sees them as necessity. He lets Persephone live after she tells him her secret that she's three months pregnant; with no idea who the father is (Baal or Nergal). As Baal burns down Valhalla, Persephone gets an unknown text asking if anyone is alive and if what The Norns have said about Wōden is true.
"Never again."- Minerva	37	June 27, 2018
In Egypt, during 3127 B.C., Minerva attempts the ritual with only three heads and herself as the fourth; but the power turns on her, destroying her body. Waking up ninety years later on a beach in Crete, the next Minerva swears to never do that again. As shown earlier, the Persephone of Crete would be killed by Minerva rather than an Ananke. In the present, Minerva prepares the three heads for Wōden's finding them by sewing their mouths shut. Fans discuss Urðr's crazy story; none of them believe her as Wōden brainwashed everyone into thinking the gig went great. The Valkyries then recaptured The Norns. In the underground, Laura meets with Nergal but cannot tell him about the pregnancy nor Baal's secret. The Morrígan awakens and knocks out Laura. Nergal learns from Minerva's text that The Morrígan ignored Sakhmet's attack on Laura. He breaks up with her, causing Badb to attack him. Nergal gets the upper hand but cannot kill her; so Badb kills him, immediately regretting it. Laura wakes up to see Gentle Annie resurrect Nergal at the cost of The Morrígan's triple life.
"Of course they can't resist it." - Ananke	38	August 15, 2018
In 1944, a young Ananke (who was the 1923 Minerva), talks to Robert Graves inspiring his essay on myth-making: The White Goddess. in 1957, after hearing Graves speak she says he heard what he wished, and made up the rest; but everyone does. Minerva appears in a field in July 2013, calling Ananke to come pick her up and pay off a couple to pose as her parents. Ananke's attack on Minerva was all a ruse so Minerva could carry on the work after Ananke fell. The machine truly does nothing and Ananke's suicide note was for Minerva. In the present, Nergal takes The Morrigan's body to where they live in The Underground preparing to memorialize her. Laura tells him she is pregnant. He says he will support her but to never do what he did in life. This makes Laura realize something. Wōden has The Norns imprisoned, working with Beth and her crew to create the smear campaign that Urðr is going insane. Woden has The Norns divine where the heads are, finding them with their mouths sewn shut, and is convinced not to touch them by Minerva. Talking with Baal, Minerva is horrified to hear Persephone is pregnant. Laura returns to her place, finding her other phone; and sending a text to Urðr (and Wōden): to watch out for Baal in April and she's sorry she cannot help. Laura decides to give up and leaves. Minerva has Wōden force The Norns to divine where Laura is, Urðr reveals Persephone doesn't exist.
"The cycle breaks. I see." - Ananke	39	September 12, 2018
Ten days later, Wōden prepares a machine for a grand ritual, not quite having Dionysus' powers of control mastered yet. He also has a gun set to stun to capture Persephone, but Minerva sets it to lethal. He sends Beth, Robin and Toni in power suits to capture her. The sister's fourth rule is revealed to be that if her god ever has a child: the cycle will break and the Great Darkness takes Ananke forever. When confronted by the trio, Laura reveals she is not a god anymore, and also had an abortion. Beth is disgusted Laura gave up her powers, and lets her go to live with the shame. Wōden no longer considers Laura a threat. Minerva believes she has won, able to manipulate Wōden and Baal, having The Norns under control (with Urðr to become the forth head), and expecting Nergal and The Morrigan to destroy each other. A final flashback shows the sister tell her grandson that the fourth rule will be a lie to fool Ananke, and they must have faith one of the children will find the real way out. Laura goes home, determined without godhood to decide who and what she is for herself; revealed to still summon fire with a snap of her fingers.

=== Okay ===
The final arc.

Title	Issue #	Release date
"We've got to look after each other." - Tom	40	December 5, 2018
Recorded footage of the 02 disaster of May 1, 2015. Fan of Persephone, Tom, and his friend Nathan record themselves getting ready for Baal's final gig at the 02 arena, holding 20,000 people. Minerva, Wōden and Baal discuss the plan. Using technology to mimic Dioynsus' powers to control the crowd and lure out The Great Darkness, Baal believes he can destroy it by sacrificing the crowd.Though there won't be any children at the gig he still feels very guilty and his unknowing mother encourages him to go through with it; Baal has included her in the crowd. Minerva tells her "little monster" to create what seems like a plague to turn them against each other; while also mocking the Great Darkness. Several people who've previously interacted with the Pantheon attend the event, falling under the spell. Outside the arena, The Great Darkness appears and is seemingly caught by a blast. Afterwards, the fans are still alive with no idea what happened; Tom's phone shows Laura appearing and promising everyone it will be okay.
"I'll make you something wonderful." - Mimir	41	January 15, 2019
Laura still has limited powers of fire and vocal control, using them to free The Norns whom then fight off the Valkyries. Urðr finds the 3 heads of Lucifer, Inanna and Tara, while freeing Mimir's head. Fleeing to the Underground, the first 3 heads are able to expose Minerva as Ananke. Laura has a solution for 3 of the heads to get bodies again. Tara volunteers to stay a head, Mimir promises to make her something wonderful. Meeting with Nergal, he reveals The Morrígan intended for him and her to constantly resurrect the other one while forever being apart. Laura helps him through the abuse. Nergal permanently kills The Morrígan's 3 incarnations, allowing for the other 3 heads to claim the bodies. Laura has a plan but needs Baal for it to work. In order to prove the Great Darkness isn't the real problem, Urðr asks a new question with her powers.
"I am oh so bored of men like you." - Minerva	42	February 27, 2019
Laura is able to show Baal the real source of The Great Darkness-the 1831 creature, which that era's Wōden merged with, and then was captured by Minerva/Ananke in 1923; forced to do their bidding as their monster ever since. Baal grants her the mercy of killing her. Mimir texts his father the truth about Minerva, causing him to send the controlled Valkyries after her; but Minerva easily turns them back on him, crushing Wōden's skull and tearing him apart. After Baal protects his family from the Valkyries and turns them over to the police, the footage of Laura killing Ananke goes live. Laura says she can end this so all the gods will be like her. Nergal flees to Dionysus' hospital room, sadly killing his brain to bring back Dionysus instead.
"Whatever happens, you get to live." - Cassandra	43	April 24, 2019
Minerva takes control of Beth, Robin and Toni, sending them and the Valkyries after the gods while she sets up Wōden's machine to control the gods. Dionysus is able to shut it down. The Valkyries, Robin, Toni and the other two Norns all leave before the last conflict (knocking Beth out when she still wants the power of the gods). Confronting Minerva, Laura uses her powers to help her show them the truth. In the ancient time, Ananke and her sister had minor miracle abilities and found ten others whom shared the skill. Ananke wanted to cheat death, while signs pointed to twelve like them being born into every generation. Ananke's sister discovered the power of "godhood" displaying the grander miracles. One of their group only saw himself as a god and his power burned him out after two years; godhood is a shortcut to power as opposed to a lifetime of work-a song that will end. Ananke proposes she create the cage of a story, labeling each generation's twelve children as a god that takes advantage of each person's weaknesses while she collects the heads as both Maiden and Crone. In the present, the humans renounce their godhood, realising what each of their weaknesses was; though Lucifer refuses and summons her fire.
"I need time." - Minerva	44	July 4, 2019
Outside, the police arrest the Valkyries, other two Norns, Beth, Robin and Toni. Laura is able to use her vocal powers to put on a performance for Lucifer. Lucifer realizes her dream to be in on stage is not worth her life, reverting to just Eleanor. Though Minerva claims her powers are gone without the gods, the others expect the cycle to continue as long as she's alive. Though Laura initially wants to kill her, she is convinced to lock Minerva in the cage that held Mimir; realizing she doesn't want to be a murderer anymore. However, Valentine no longer wants to live, so he grabs Minerva, and throws himself off a ledge, killing them both. The others agree to follow Cassandra's plan. Laura disarms the police but then everyone allows themselves to be arrested. On June 16, 2015, at Laura's trial, the court appreciates everyone's cooperation in explaining everything but she is still guilty of killing Ananke. The judge prepares to deliver Laura's sentence, as she seems content.
	45	September 4, 2019
On July 16, 2055, 40 years after the Recurrence ended, an elderly Laura arrives at Valhalla, now a museum dedicated to the Recurrence, to attend Cassandra's funeral. Laura meets with Eleanor, revealing that the two eventually split up and Laura and Cassandra married instead. Laura meets with the surviving members of the Recurrence: Zahid, Aruna (now using a robotic body invented by Jon), Jon, Meredith, Zoe, and Umar. She speaks with them about the people they have lost and the lives they have led. Laura begins the funeral, but instead of giving Cassandra's eulogy, activates a hologram that Cassandra recorded before her death. Cassandra speaks to each member of the Recurrence, explaining what they have meant to her and how she feels about her life, before ending with the words Ananke spoke at the end of each Recurrence: "I love you. I love you all. I'll miss you." As Aruna sings to end the funeral, Laura steps away and speaks directly to the reader, explaining that this is the story that she has told and speaking on what a lifetime of work means. Laura counts to four while making her final points on the nature of stories and the future, and snaps her fingers.

== Specials ==
=== Specials ===
Standalone specials written about Pantheons through the ages, featuring contributions by different artists.

Title	Year Featured	Guest Artist	Release date
"You will go on long after we are gone." - Woden	1831	Stephanie Hans	September 21, 2016
By March 5, 1831, five Gods remain alive: Hades, Lucifer, Inanna, Wōden and The Morrígan. In Rome, Hades is delirious on his deathbed when Ananke kills him. At the Villa Diodati on Lake Geneva, the last few Gods and Goddesses of the recurrence gather to wait out their final days. The group decide to tell stories to pass the time. Inanna tells of her life as Claire Claremont and how her step-sister and her husband, Mary and Percy Shelley, were granted Godhood by Ananke before her and the feelings about this. Wōden tells of her three attempts to have a child, all ending with failure. Lucifer and Morrígan reveal they are plotting to resurrect Hades using their abilities but the creature they create is monstrous and kills the pair. As it prepares to kill Inanna, Wōden intervenes and merges with the creature to stop it. The shell of Wōden controlled by the creature reveals Wōden knew all along that Inanna killed her three children to keep her divinity. The creature is about to kill her when Inanna reveals she is pregnant with Lucifer's child, so it spares her and disappears across the frozen lake outside the villa. A week later, Inanna thinks she has been spared, but Ananke appears and kills her, ending the Occurrence on March 19, 1831.
"Let me burn." - Lucifer	455	André Lima Araújo	May 18, 2017
By August 455, Lucifer is the only God left alive. Calling himself Julius Caesar, he approaches the Vandal army, kills many whilst scattering the others and is then declared Emperor of Rome. His lover Bacchus praises his performance as an emperor, and Lucifer wishes he was there, revealing him as a vision. Ananke arrives to condemn his actions and that he should have killed himself as his time is up and he is endangering the future. Lucifer rejects his role as a God and wants to be merely a man again. Ananke begs him to sacrifice himself and when he refuses attempts to kill him. Instead Lucifer sets her on fire and moves to kill her, but she convinces him to give it two weeks and if he isn't dead he is allowed to kill her. The Vandals return and gather nearby but instead of dealing with them as his council wishes him, he kills the council for patronising him and turns them into a human harp. He begins to fall apart, bleeding everywhere so demands to talk to Jupiter. He gathers Rome's gold at the temple and begs to live, but slowly falls apart on himself and dies, saying 'et tu, Jupiter' as he dies. Ananke takes his body and takes him outside the rules, beginning to cut him up and throw him in the river, giving him the pagan funeral she promised. Geiseric approaches her, saying he witnessed Baal last year and wondered if he had the same power as Lucifer. Ananke wants Geiseric to take the city and erase the rule of Lucifer as emperor from history, ending the Occurrence on August 16, 455.
"Well done us."- Lucifer	2013-2014	Kris Anka, Chynna Clugston Flores, Carla Speed McNeil, Rachael Stott, Emma Vieceli, Matt Wilson	December 13, 2017
In November 2013, Baal has sex with Inanna and falls in love with him. The next month as Sakhmet and Lucifer wake, Baal confronts Lucifer for sleeping with Inanna as well; though the warning not to use their powers prevents a proper fight. Sakhmet leaves Lucifer, calling her a bad person. Cameron (Nergal) hitchhikes to London for one of The Morrigan's early gigs, meeting Umar (Dionysus) and they become friends; though Cameron warns Umar not to believe in people's better natures. In October 2013, Ananke encourages Tara to perform her own music no matter what the mortals think; secretly acknowledging the advice was actually cruel. In August 2013, Elanor tells Hazel over gaming that she would want to be the furthest thing from a god. Two months later after she transformed, Lucifer dismisses Hazel. In December 2013 she is saddened that Hazel became Amaterasu and will soon die as well. In January 2014, Laura admits her attraction to Lucifer in jail. In May 2014, Laura sleeps with Baal whom asks her not to tell Inanna; Laura believes it will become complicated.
"This will have to be my masterpiece."- Ananke	1923	Aud Koch	February 7, 2018
In 1923, Lucifer calls all the gods together onto his private island mansion and smaller island with a lighthouse; to celebrate their final few weeks together complete with a projection of a butler. Ananke privately prepares a grand plan as it is unusual to have all the gods still alive this late in the cycle. Amaterasu and Susanoo have never acted on their obvious feelings for one another; despite being strangers as mortals they are brother and sister as gods. Amon-Ra is still not over Amaterasu leaving him. The elitists Baal and Set are disgusted by the trio's interpretation of art. German futurist Woden loves the National Socialism spreading in his homeland. The child Minerva is amused by The Morrigan whom refers to himself in the third person. The three male Norns disagree on the greatest threat to the future. As Dionysus nears the end of his life, his visions of another war to come disgust the former soldier Neptune. Lucifer is found dead at his dinner table. Dionysus is soon killed by the projection technology. Neptune is found drowned on the shore. The Norns figure out that Baal, Set and Woden are working together. Set and Baal believe in preserving art and culture for those born elite by plunging the world into war and darkness to kill everyone else. Woden wants a totalitarian future for humanity. Urðr and Skuld join in: killing Veroandi for objecting to the plan. Ananke lets them choose their own path. Ananke kills The Morrigan after he has a vision and she blames the conspirators. After Minerva warns the others, they rush to stop a ritual with a machine that required the deaths of four gods, at the lighthouse. The ritual works; but Woden is shocked by the machine and vanishes. Set kills Urðr and Skuld, no longer needing them. Amaterasu uses her miracles to attack Baal and Set; killing him, while Minerva secretly murders Set. Ananke secretly meets with Woden under the lighthouse; the ritual having captured something Woden considers a "zeitgeist," for Germany: a female creature of science and fiction. Ananke removes Woden's fake godhood, (likely by killing his Mimir). Leaving Woden a mortal man once again, Ananke refuses to explain why she put all this in motion and kills him. Ananke says with all the gods killed for the dark ritual, perhaps the remaining 4 of Susanoo, Amaterasu, Minerva and Amon-Ra can give the world a chance by sacrificing themselves; creating the opening scene in the main series.
"Father, forgive me."- Lucifer	1373	Ryan Kelly	September 26, 2018
In Avignon, France, 1373 A.D., twenty-two years after the Plague known as the Black Death: Lucifer the nun has lived well past her time limit as a god but is still in full control of herself and her powers. Immune to the plague and desperate to repent, she visits a village where a girl says the disease has returned. After allowing herself to be whipped by dying Christians, Lucifer goes to visit the first patient of the village; Ananke. Hearing the old woman's confession, Ananke reveals she and her helper manipulate the other gods towards their deaths and often tell the gods the world will end if they keep living. Lucifer's human mother died of the plague but the baby survived, her father convinced his daughter that she was The Devil even before Ananke transformed her. Lucifer refuses to kill Ananke with the knife, so Ananke reveals the plague was created by the previous Pantheon; Ananke nurtured it so it would spread through Europe, the Middle East and China. She admits such a tactic isn't one she'd try again. Lucifer is enraged, but chooses to cut flesh from her hand, placing it in Ananke's mouth. Lucifer and Ananke burn together as godhood consumes the former (burning the village and ending the plague); while she makes one last plea for forgiveness from the Christian God and her birth father. From afar: the girl Minerva, watches the blaze and departs with a sack of heads.
The Funnies	N/A	Amish Steele, Erica Henderson, Chip Zdarsky, Margaux Saltel, Larissa Zageris, Kitty Curran	November 7, 2018
One last hurrah of non-canon fun written and drawn by friends of the creative team: Ananke deals with twelve reincarnated dog gods and tells them how to reach dog heaven; a chair from the opening scene of the series is granted godhood until it is recycled in two years; Matt Wilson (comics artist) and Chip Zdarsky are two failed music artists in Pittsburgh that want to become gods until Kieron Gillen and Jamie McKelvie set them straight and make Matt their colourist; Gentle Annie's speech patterns confuse everyone as she works odd jobs; Baal tries to be a rapper to connect with youth until he becomes a teacher, but most of his students disappear; WicDivFeed covers five struggles of living with Sakhmet; Ananke takes most of the gods to investigate a spooky mystery at Stonehenge; the gods are asked their guilty pleasure song and Kieron wants to write a few thousand words about the topic; reading Kieron's bad pun tweets is the reason Laura cracked her phone-because WicDiv plans for everything.
