= Phonogram (comics) =

Comic book series by Kieron Gillen & Jamie McKelvie

- Cover of Phonogram (vol. 1) #2. Art by Jamie McKelvie.

Publication information
- Publisher: Image Comics
- Schedule: Irregular
- Format: Limited series
- Genre: Dark fantasy, contemporary fantasy
- Publication date: (vol. 1); August 2006 - May 2007 (vol. 2); December 2008 - February 2010 (vol. 3); August 2015 - January 2016
- No. of issues: (vol. 1); 6 (vol. 2); 7 (vol. 3); 6
- Main character(s): David Kohl, Emily Aster

Creative team
- Created by: Kieron Gillen; Jamie McKelvie
- Written by: Kieron Gillen
- Artist: Jamie McKelvie
- Letterer: Clayton Cowles (vol. 2-3)
- Colorist(s): Matt Wilson (vol. 2-3 (single issues); vol. 1 (2017 ed.))

Collected editions
- Rue Britannia: ISBN 1582406944
- The Singles Club: ISBN 1607061791
- The Immaterial Girl: ISBN 1632156792

Phonogram is a comic book written by Kieron Gillen, drawn by Jamie McKelvie, and published by Image Comics. The comic traces the misadventures of British magicians who channel the power of music to achieve their own goals in life, although the music often comes back to haunt them in one way or another. Gillen describes Phonogram as a metaphor for his years in the British music journalism industry.

Gillen and McKelvie published their creator-owned comic in three limited series, released in 2006-07, 2008-10, and 2015-16, respectively. The first volume, the six-issue Rue Britannia, was Gillen's serialized comics debut. Music website Pitchfork called Phonogram "the ultimate music-obsessive comic."

== Concept ==
"Everyone I know is a bad person with great taste in records." (Emily Aster in The Singles Club)

Kieron Gillen had previously worked as a games and music journalist for several years before branching off into webcomics. Phonogram was his first serialized comic book. He based it on his experiences writing for music periodicals Careless Talk Costs Lives and Plan B. He recruited Jamie McKelvie to draw the comic when McKelvie approached him at a comics event.

The basic metaphor behind Phonogram is that music has magical powers, and people who understand music ("phonomancers") can use that magic for real-life purposes. In particular, journalists working at "covens" (a metaphor for music periodicals) specialise in "us[ing] their knowledge to jimmy with reality a little." (Several Phonogram characters work for a coven that is a stand-in for Plan B. Its rival coven is called "the Adversary," a reference to the New Musical Express, whose abbreviation is pronounced "enemy.") However, Gillen stresses that the magic is not limited to music journalists, and that "every Phonomancer makes their own magic system."

According to Gillen, magic in Phonogram "work[s] in ways that are vaguely analogous to what music can do [in real life]. So we don't have people throwing fireballs or any of that nonsense. It's all about changing your sense of identity or altering other people's states of mind: oracle-like self-knowledge or plain old hedonism." Uses of music in Phonogram include picking up girls, obtaining free entry to musical gigs, using "art as a personality crutch," and giving a working-class friend who loves the music of New York City a free trip to Manhattan.

Phonogram is noted for its high density of music references, and includes a glossary of the more obscure phrases and pop-culture references used at the back of each issue. Gillen suggests that readers begin with the second volume, The Singles Club, which he considers the most accessible storyline.

Gillen and McKelvie' subsequent project, The Wicked + The Divine, is a spiritual successor to Phonogram. According to Gillen, "the difference between the two is that Phonogram is really about consumers of art and WicDiv is about creators of art (or rather, it's about when someone transforms from a consumer of art to a creator of art)."

== Publication history ==
=== Editions ===
The first volume, Rue Britannia (2006-07), stars David Kohl (a parody of Gillen in his twenties), who grew up listening to Britpop but now believes that Britpop had little valuable influence on British culture. (In 2024, Gillen commented that Britpop started out with significant influence from female and queer communities, but ended up as a predominantly "male, straight, 1960s and leaden" movement.) Kohl cultivates a rude and toxic image and viciously insults bands he dislikes (and their fans); Gillen explained that "Kohl is my music journalism 'voice' of five years ago. essentially monstrous. That sort of late 20s evil." When Britpop's goddess, Britannia, disappears from her tomb in preparation for a Britpop revival, Kohl realises that although he "always explicitly hated nostalgia culture," he is now "seeing [his] own formative experiences fed into that blender 10 years later ... and worse, having to deal with it moving [him]." Kohl goes on a quest to find Britannia, during which he ponders the value and power of nostalgia, and "learn[s] what to let go of his past and what to hold on to." Gillen modeled Rue Britannia's aesthetic on Hellblazer.

The second volume, The Singles Club (2008-10), consists of seven one-shot issues centering on one night at an indie music dance club (based on a real-life indie night in Bristol). Each issue tracks a different character, essentially retelling various incidents in Rashomon style. Gillen explained that he wanted "to explore how much subjective experiences of a shared social event can differ," and that the characters are "all in this same tiny club but their nights are profoundly different." He added that the story is built around "two pairs of characters, two who are entering their twenties and two that are leaving it, and having a moment of connection—or not."

The third volume, The Immaterial Girl (2015-16), tracks Kohl's editor Emily Aster, who years ago decided to abandon one half of her personality (Claire, a self-harming goth) to showcase the other half (Emily, whose fashionable arrogance impresses some and alienates others). After a particularly distressing encounter with an old friend, Claire takes control and tries to shut down Emily's coven, while Emily navigates the old music videos of Claire's subconscious to find a way out. Emily realises that she split herself after deciding that "if she can't love herself, she'll build a her that can, or at least one that doesn't care," yet "the trade she made did nothing to solve the core problem of her self-loathing." Gillen commented that the story is about how "music will save your life, but may leave you with a life not worth saving." One issue concentrates on two younger characters from The Singles Club who attempt to avoid repeating Emily's mistakes, and is drawn as a homage to Scott Pilgrim.

A collected hardcover edition, The Complete Phonogram, was released in 2017. Matt Wilson (the colorist for the second and third volumes) colored the previously black-and-white Rue Britannia for the hardcover version.

=== Sales and possible future ===
When Rue Britannia was published, Gillen and McKelvie hoped for a monthly circulation of 6,000, but the eventual sales figures of 4,000 were financially disappointing, and prompted McKelvie to take time off the series to work for better-paying publishers. Gillen later remarked that if Rue Britannia had sold the additional 2,000 copies per month, he and McKelvie would have converted the comic into an ongoing series. Following disappointing sales for the first two volumes, Gillen initially ruled out a third volume.

Gillen announced a third volume in 2012, cryptically stating that "circumstances have changed." McKelvie began work on the first issue, but following the success of the Gillen/McKelvie run of Marvel's Young Avengers, the series was shelved for the time being. The series was delayed again while Gillen and McKelvie launched The Wicked + The Divine. McKelvie took time off the latter comic to draw Immaterial Girl (Gillen recruited guest artists to fill in), which was announced at the 2015 Image Expo for a 2015-16 run. The Immaterial Girl sold considerably better than the first two volumes. It debuted at 15,856 copies; for comparison, Gillen and McKelvie's other creator-owned comic, The Wicked + The Divine, sold 20,161 copies that month.

Gillen states that he has no plans to write a fourth volume of Phonogram, and plans to repurpose any leftover Phonogram ideas (such as a story where Beach Boys fanatics attempt to reconstruct the unfinished album Smile) for other comic projects. In 2019, he explained that while the younger phonomancers started their own coven in the final issue of Rue Britannia, the point was not to set up a fourth volume, but to show that "the process we'd seen is cyclical ... it's 2019, and by now, both Laura and Logos will have gone through their own Immaterial Girl and Rue Britannia."

== Reception ==
Phonogram received generally positive reviews. The complete series has an average rating of 8.4/10 on Comic Book Roundup, and The Singles Club and The Immaterial Girl have ratings of 9.2 and 8.9, respectively. In Comic Book Resources' 2024 ranking of the 50 greatest graphic novels of all time, The Singles Club placed 36th and The Immaterial Girl placed 46th. Alan Moore wrote that the Gillen-McKelvie partnership displayed "a dance-like or musical sensibility creeping into the storytelling, a kind of fluorescence ... The most distinctive things about [Phonogram] are its relentless progressive momentum and the sense of effervescent colour - probably hot pink." Eddie Argos called the comic "universal and life affirming."

The series has also been praised by critics outside the traditional comic book industry. Music website Pitchfork called it "the ultimate music-obsessive comic," and Grimes claimed that she had never listened to a-ha's Take on Me until she read Phonogram.

However, Rue Britannia was questioned for its perceived music elitism, an impression Gillen sought to dispel with The Singles Club. Ohio State University's Jared Gardner responded that "knowing the music referenced is in no way essential to getting the points the comic is trying to convey. True, if you know the specific songs you will have access to an additional level of the work, but Gillen and McKelvie are so good at their craft that you don't need that layer." Gillen complained that "the Rue Britannia reviews which always make me mad are normally the ones who say that we're trying so hard to be cool. If cool was the point, we'd have never selected Britpop in a million years."

In 2015, Gillen said "if there's only one of my comics that has to exist, I would probably still keep Singles Club."

== Cover art ==
=== Rue Britannia ===
In keeping with the Britpop theme, the six individual issues and the collection had cover art based on album artwork from that era.

Issue Number	Issue Title	Influencing Album & Artist
1	Without Your Permission	Elastica – Elastica
2	Can't Imagine the World Without Me	It's Great When You're Straight... Yeah – Black Grape
3	Faster	Definitely Maybe – Oasis
4	Murder Park	Modern Life Is Rubbish – Blur
5	Kissing with Dry Lips	Suede – Suede
6	Live Forever	The Holy Bible – Manic Street Preachers
TPB collecting issues 1–6	Rue Britannia	This Is Hardcore – Pulp

=== The Singles Club ===
The cover art is based on nightclub flyers. Most of the covers also reference songs from artists that are meaningful to each issue's focus character.

Issue Number	Issue Title	Relevant Song	Focus Character
1	Pull Shapes	The Pipettes – Pull Shapes	Penny B
2	Wine and Bed and More and Again	CSS – Let's Make Love and Listen to Death from Above	Marc
3	We Share Our Mother's Health	The Knife – We Share Our Mothers' Health	Emily Aster
4	Konichiwa Bitches	Robyn – Konichiwa Bitches	Seth Bingo and Silent Girl
5	Lust Etc	The Long Blondes – Lust in the Movies	Laura Heaven
6	Ready to Be Heartbroken	Camera Obscura – Lloyd, I'm Ready to Be Heartbroken	Lloyd
7	Wolf Like Me	TV on the Radio – Wolf Like Me	Kid-with-knife

The first print of issue 5 was recalled due to it having been printed with the bar code from issue 4. The second print corrected the error.

=== The Immaterial Girl ===
The cover art draws from a variety of influences, including album covers and comic books. However, the primary influence is music videos, as The Immaterial Girl focuses heavily on main character Emily Aster (a childhood fan of MTV)'s relationship with these videos.

Issue Number	Issue Title	Influence
1	Plan B	Duran Duran and the art of Patrick Nagel
2	Girl Anachronism	The video for Take On Me – A-ha
3	"I" Falls Apart	The videos for Total Eclipse of the Heart – Bonnie Tyler and Material Girl - Madonna
4	(Let's Make This) Precious Little Life	Scott Pilgrim vol. 1 – Bryan Lee O'Malley
5	Losing My Edge	The video for Money for Nothing – Dire Straits
6	See Emily Play	Don't Give Up – Peter Gabriel and Kate Bush
TPB collecting issues 1–6	The Immaterial Girl	n/a

== Collected editions ==
The three limited series have been collected as trade paperbacks:

- Volume 1: Rue Britannia (144 pages, Image Comics, June 2007, ISBN 1-58240-694-4)
- Volume 2: The Singles Club (160 pages, Image Comics, December 2009, ISBN 1-60706-179-1)
- Volume 3: The Immaterial Girl (168 pages, Image Comics, March 2016, ISBN 1-63215-679-2)

There is also a one volume, complete edition hardcover:

- The Complete Phonogram HC (504 pages, Image Comics, May 2017, ISBN 978-1534301511)
  - Collects Phonogram #1-6, Phonogram 2: The Singles Club #1-7, Phonogram 3: The Immaterial Girl #1-6, and back matter (the "B-Sides") that was not included in the trade paperbacks

== Notes ==
References

- Phonogram at the Grand Comics Database
- Phonogram at the Comic Book DB (archived from the original)
- Phonogram: The Singles Club at the Grand Comics Database
- Phonogram: The Singles Club at the Comic Book DB (archived from the original)
