= Matt Wilson (comics artist) =

American artist

- Areas: Inker, Colourist
- Notable works: Paper Girls; Wonder Woman; The Wicked + The Divine; Young Avengers; Fire Power
- Awards: Eisner Award 2017

Matt Wilson is an American artist and colorist working in the comics industry. According to CBR, he is "one of comics' most in demand colorists".

== Career ==
Matt Wilson attended Savannah College of Art and Design in Georgia to complete a degree in Sequential Art. After college, he found he was more interested in working in story boarding, character design, and sculpting.

Wilson's early professional coloring work was as a member of Lee Loughridge's Savanah-based color studio, Zylonol, where he replaced Nick Dragotta. His time as part of this team allowed him to develop his craft and build up experience in delivering books. He branched out into taking coloring jobs on under his own name, starting in 2008, through contacts including Ivan Brandon, Rick Remender, Jamie McKelvie and Kieron Gillen. This led to his first credited work on McKelvie's Suburban Glamour. Since then, he has worked widely across the industry for series published by DC, Marvel, Image and Dark Horse.

Wilson was nominated for the 2015 Eisner Award for Best Colorist/Coloring, and won in 2017. He was also nominated for the 2015 Harvey Award for Best Colorist.

=== Style ===
Wilson sees the choice of palette to be crucial, whether for the story and the specific scene – as "they're the first thing a reader sees" when they open the book, relating to the emotion, location and time within a story. Additionally, he emphasizes color theory as crucial before the use of other rendering techniques, such as textures, highlights and shadows. He also stresses the importance of working with the rest of a book's creative team from the outset and throughout.

== Personal life ==
Wilson currently lives in Atlanta.

== Selected bibliography ==
- Suburban Glamour (2008-9, with Jamie McKelvie)
- Phonogram (2008, 2015 with Kieron Gillen and Jamie McKelvie)
- Wonder Woman (2011–14, with Cliff Chiang and Brian Azzarello)
- Men of War (2011, with Ivan Brandon and Tom Derenick)
- Swamp Thing, (2011–2014, with Charles Soule and Jesús Saíz)
- Secret Avengers (2011–15, with Rick Remender, Renato Guedes, Matteo Scalera, Aleš Kot, Michael Walsh, Warren Ellis, and Jamie McKelvie)
- Young Avengers (2013–14, with Kieron Gillen and Jamie McKelvie)
- Terminator Salvation: The Final Battle (2013, with J. Michael Straczynski and Pete Woods)
- The Wicked + The Divine (2014–2019, with Kieron Gillen and Jamie McKelvie)
- Daredevil, (2014, with Mark Waid and Chris Samnee)
- Cry Havoc (2015–, with Simon Spurrier, Ryan Kelly, Nick FilardI and Lee Loughridge)
- Paper Girls (2015–2019, with Brian K. Vaughan and Cliff Chiang)
- Black Widow (2015–16, with Mark Waid and Chris Samnee)
- The Mighty Thor (2016–2018, with Jason Aaron and Russell Dauterman)
- Star-Lord (2016–2017, with Chip Zdarsky)
- Runaways (2017-2021, with Rainbow Rowell)
- Marauders (2019-2021, with Gerry Duggan and Russell Dauterman (covers only))
- Fire Power (2020-ongoing, with Robert Kirkman and Chris Samnee)
- Daredevil (2022-ongoing, with Chip Zdarsky, Marco Checchetto, and Rafael De Latorre)
