= Fire Power (comic book) =

Comic book

- Cover for Fire Power #30

Publication information
- Publisher: Image Comics, Skybound
- Schedule: Monthly
- Publication date: August 5, 2020 – January 31, 2024
- No. of issues: 30
- Main character: Owen Johnson

Creative team
- Created by: Robert Kirkman (writer); Chris Samnee (artist)
- Written by: Robert Kirkman
- Artist: Chris Samnee
- Letterer: Rus Wooton
- Colorist: Matt Wilson
- Editor(s): Sean Macckiewicz; Kate Caudill (Assistant Editor)

Fire Power is an ongoing comic book series created by Robert Kirkman and Chris Samnee, published monthly by Image Comics as of August 2020.

== Publication history ==
Fire Power was first announced in December 2019. The series was originally intended to be published with an original graphic novel (OGN) prelude in April 2020, followed by a free first issue in May as a part of 2020's Free Comic Book Day (FCBD). The idea was that the free first issue would result in customers buying the Prelude OGN. This was a concept Kirkman came up with after discussing with comic store owners about ways to make Free Comic Book Day better for them. However, due to the impact of the COVID-19 pandemic and the cancelation of FCBD, these plans had to change. The FCBD issue was rebranded as the Fire Power #1 promotional edition and released on the same day as the Prelude OGN in early July. The standard edition of Fire Power #1 came out in August, containing special features not included in the promotional edition.

Kirkman and Samnee worked well ahead of schedule on the series. In a July 2020 interview, Kirkman mentioned that the first twelve issues were already complete, some of which are extended beyond standard length. The series is scheduled to end with its thirtieth issue.

== Plot summary ==
Series synopsis courtesy of Image Comics:

"The one who wields the fire power is destined to save the world, but Owen Johnson has turned his back on that life. He doesn't want the power—he never did. He only wants to spend time with his family and live his life, but unseen forces are at work to make that impossible. Danger lurks around every corner as Owen's past comes back to haunt him."

== Reception and sales ==
Issue	Publication date	Comic Book Roundup rating
Volume 1: Prelude	July 1, 2020	8.7 by 11 professional critics
#1 (promo ed.)	July 1, 2020	Data not available
#1	August 5, 2020	8.6 by 5 professional critics
#2	August 5, 2020	8.0 by 1 professional critic
#3	September 2, 2020	8.4 by 3 professional critics
#4	October 7, 2020	Data not available
#5	November 4, 2020	8.0 by 1 professional critic
#6	December 2, 2020	Data not available
#7	January 6, 2021	8.9 by 3 professional critics
#8	February 3, 2021	8.0 by 1 professional critic
#9	March 3, 2021	9.0 by 1 professional critic
#10	April 7, 2021	Data not available
#11	May 5, 2021	Data not available
#12	June 2, 2021	Data not available
#13	July 7, 2021	Data not available
#14	August 4, 2021	8.7 by 1 professional critic
#15	September 1, 2021	Data not available
#16	October 6, 2021	Data not available
#17	November 3, 2021	Data not available
#18	December 1, 2021	Data not available
#19	April 6, 2022	Data not available
#20	May 4, 2022	Data not available
#21	June 1, 2022	Data not available
#22	July 6, 2022	Data not available
#23	August 3, 2022	Data not available
#24	October 26, 2022	Data not available
#25	July 26, 2023	Data not available
#26	August 23, 2023	Data not available
#27	September 27, 2023	Data not available
#28	October 25, 2023	Data not available
#29	November 22, 2023	7.6 by 1 professional critic
#30	February 21, 2024	Data not available

== Collected editions ==
Title	Material collected	Publication date	ISBN
Fire Power Vol. 1: Prelude	Original graphic novel	July 1, 2020	ISBN 9781534316553
Fire Power Vol. 2: Home Fire	Fire Power #1–6	January 6, 2021	ISBN 9781534317185
Fire Power Vol. 3: Flame War	Fire Power #7–12	July 7, 2021	ISBN 9781534319080
Fire Power Vol. 4: Scorched Earth	Fire Power #13–18	March 2, 2022	ISBN 9781534321038
Fire Power Vol. 5: Flaming Fist	Fire Power #19–24	November 1, 2022	ISBN 9781534323919
Fire Power – Book One	Fire Power – Volume 1: Prelude and Fire Power #1–12	June 7, 2022	ISBN 9781534322073
Fire Power Vol. 6: Flameout	Fire Power #25-30	April 3, 2024	ISBN 9781534399853
Fire Power – Book Two	Fire Power #13-30	July 30, 2024	ISBN 9781534327245
