= Chris Samnee =

American comic book artist

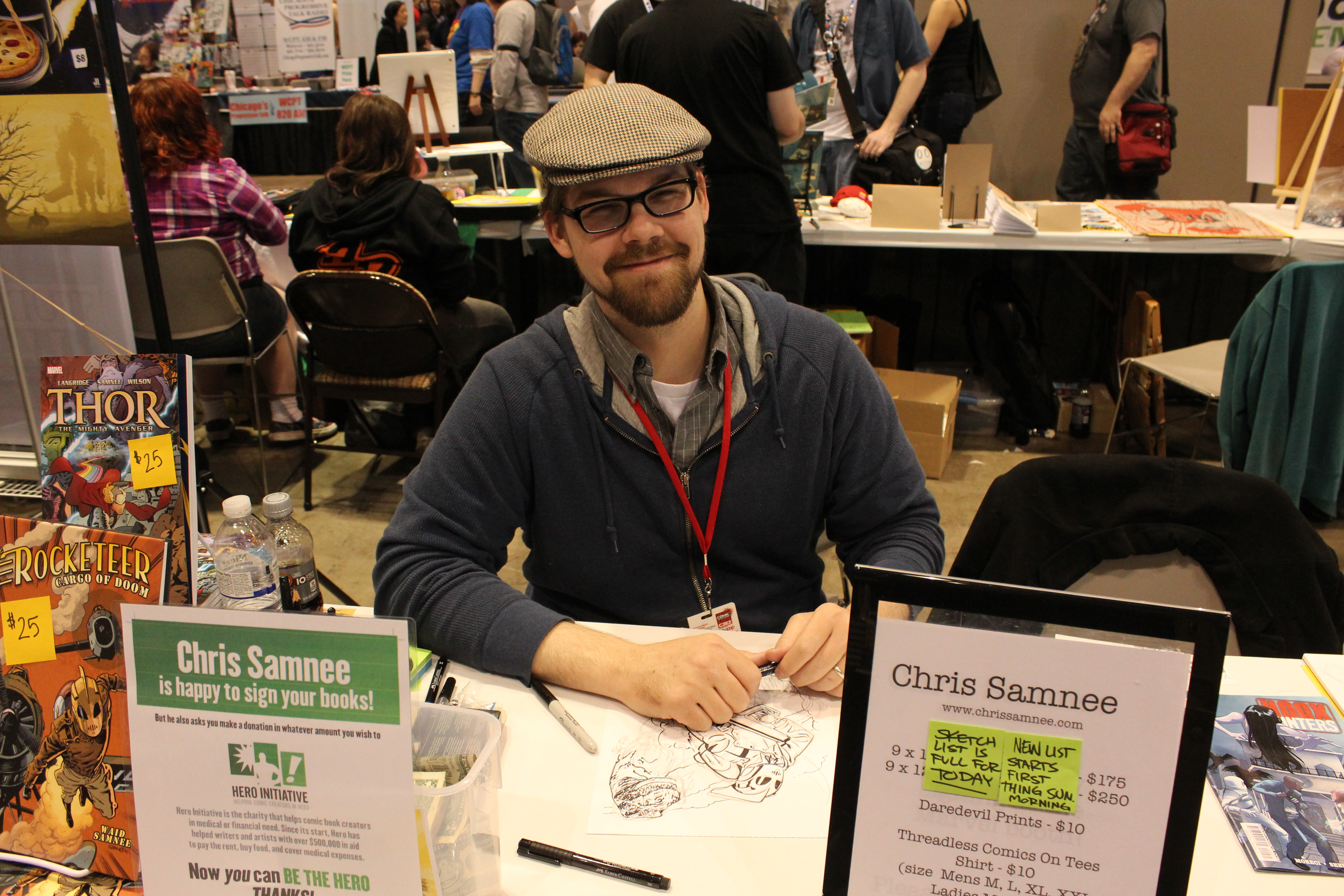
- Chris Samnee in 2013
- Area: Artist
- Notable works: Capote in Kansas; Thor: The Mighty Avenger; Daredevil; The Rocketeer: Cargo of Doom; The Shadow; Fire Power
- Awards: 2011 Harvey Award for Most Promising Newcomer; 2013 Eisner Award for Best Penciller/Inker; 2021 Inkwell Awards All-in-One Award; 2025 Inkwell Awards All-in-One Award

Chris Samnee is an American comic book artist. He received the 2011 Harvey Award for Most Promising Newcomer for his work on the Thor: The Mighty Avenger, and won a 2013 Eisner Award for Best Penciller/Inker for his work on The Rocketeer: Cargo of Doom and Daredevil. He was also nominated for the 2006 Russ Manning Most Promising Newcomer Award. In 2020 he co-created the Image Comics series Fire Power alongside writer Robert Kirkman.

== Early life ==
Chris Samnee grew up in De Soto, a nearby suburb of St. Louis. His earliest exposure to superheroes came through the Super Friends cartoon. He was not aware of the print source material for those cartoons until his grandmother began buying him three-packs of comics from a grocery store. His first comic book was a Batman book that he read when he was five or six years old, and that became his favorite character. He began copying the work of 80s artists whose work he was exposed to, like Tom Mandrake, Jim Aparo and Alan Davis. He would also research those who influenced these artists, such as comic strip artist Milton Caniff, whom Samnee read in an interview in Comics Journal was an influence on Aparo, and Frank Robbins. Samnee's grandmother further encouraged Samnee to expand his reading to the Dick Tracy comic strips found in a collection at a local library. By his mid-teens he was also heavily interested in Japanese manga and anime.

Samnee was about 10 years old when he realized he wanted to produce comics for a living. He convinced his parents to drive him an hour and a half to the airport Holiday Inn, where local comics conventions were held, and where he would bombard writers and artists with questions on how to produce comics and break into the industry. One particularly helpful creator was Conan artist Mike Doherty, who advised him on what to draw, and gave him some 11 x 14 Marvel Comics illustration board to draw on. Samnee was so in awe of holding professional board with the Marvel logo printed on it that he could not bring himself to draw on it, and in a 2013 interview, indicated that he still had it.

== Career ==
Samnee was 15 when his first work was published, art for an eight-page Silver Age Batman-type story for Gary Carlson's book, Big Bang Comics, which was being published by Image Comics at the time. He was not paid for the work, but did the job as stepping stone to future paid work. He would continue working odd jobs, such as flea market caricature artist, a pizza cook, a cable guy in order to pay bills until he could find paying comics work. He did unpaid art for FemForce for AC Comics while working as a barista at Borders Books. He drew the Oni Press graphic novel Capote in Kansas around 2004 or 2005, inking his own pencils because that book's budget did not provide for an inker. That work was published in 2006, and Samnee was nominated for the Russ Manning Most Promising Newcomer Award. Today he inks his own pencils, as he describes his pencils as "just awful", and not something he would envision another person inking.

While he was still working at Borders, he signed a contract to do a graphic novel for Vertigo, though it would be months before the writer finished the script that Samnee could begin drawing. During this time he did some short stories, American Splendor an issue of Exterminators that Tony Moore had recommended him for, and three issue of Queen & Country with writer Greg Rucka. Prior to doing the last issue of Queen & Country, he drew an issue of Area 10 for Vertigo.

In 2009 Samnee drew a story written by Ed Brubaker for Daredevil #500. That same year he drew The Mighty for DC Comics, working with writer Peter J. Tomasi. Tomasi would later recommend Samnee to draw a couple of short stories he wrote for DC's 2009–2010 "Blackest Night" storyline. Tomasi would also subsequently hired Samnee to illustrate the latter portion of Tomasi's creator-owned Image Comics series, Battlegrounds, when the initial artist on it, Peter Snejbjerg, was forced to leave it before completing it.

In 2010, Nate Cosby offered Samnee the art duties on the all-ages book Thor: The Mighty Avenger. Though Samnee initially was apprehensive about not being the right fit for that character, after reading Roger Langridge's script, he accepted the job, which garnered him his first major notice from readers of the superhero genre, and the 2011 Harvey Award for Most Promising New Talent, as well as nominations for Best Artist and Best New Series. He remained on that series, drawing all eight issues before it was cancelled in March 2011.

In 2012, Samnee drew Ultimate Comics Spider-Man #6. That same year, he returned to Daredevil as the regular artist on the series with writer Mark Waid, beginning with issue #12. He continued on that series until issue #36 and both he and Waid remained as creative team when Marvel relaunched that series with a new #1 issue in April 2014.

In 2019, it was announced that Samnee would co-create Fire Power with Robert Kirkman. The ongoing series launched in July 2020 with a prelude volume and proceeded to a monthly format in August 2020.

In 2021, Samnee launched a creator-owned fantasy series titled Jonna and the Unpossible Monsters, co-written with his wife, Laura Samnee, and drawn by Samnee himself, and published by Oni Press.

== Techniques and materials ==
Samnee uses 300 series two-ply Strathmore Bristol board. He does not use non-photo blue pencils or any other equipment purchased at specialty stores for preliminary sketching, but uses .9 mm mechanical pencils that he purchases from Target. For inking he formerly used a sable hair Rafael 8404 number 3, 4, and 5, but found that he was able to produce convention sketches more quickly with implements that could be easily stored in pencil bags or pencil boxes, like brush pens, which eliminated the need to clean brushes and the worry about spilling ink. He eventually began using these tools for his professional work as well. The brush pens he uses include Zebra and Kuretake models, though most of his work is with a Pentel color brush, whose synthetic hair and refillable, squeezable barrel allows Samnee to controls the amount of ink on the brush. According to Samnee, this implement feels similar to a dipped brush, but does not require cleaning, and allows him the convenience to work wherever he wants.

== Personal life ==
In June 2013 Samnee took a paternity leave during the production of Daredevil (Vol 3) #28 and 29 so that he and his wife could spend time with their new baby.

== Awards and nominations ==
- 2011 Harvey Award for Most Promising New Talent (for Thor: The Mighty Avenger)
- 2013 Eisner Award for Best Penciller/Inker (for Daredevil and The Rocketeer: Cargo of Doom; shared with David Aja)
- 2021 Inkwell Awards All-in-One Award
- 2025 Inkwell Awards All-in-One Award

=== Nominations ===
- 2006 Russ Manning Most Promising Newcomer Award (for Capote in Kansas)
- 2011 Harvey Award for Best Artist (for Thor: The Mighty Avenger)
- 2011 Harvey Award for Best New Series (for Thor: The Mighty Avenger)
- 2013 National Cartoonist Society Award for Comic Books (for Daredevil)
