= Jamie McKelvie =

British illustrator of comic books and graphic novels

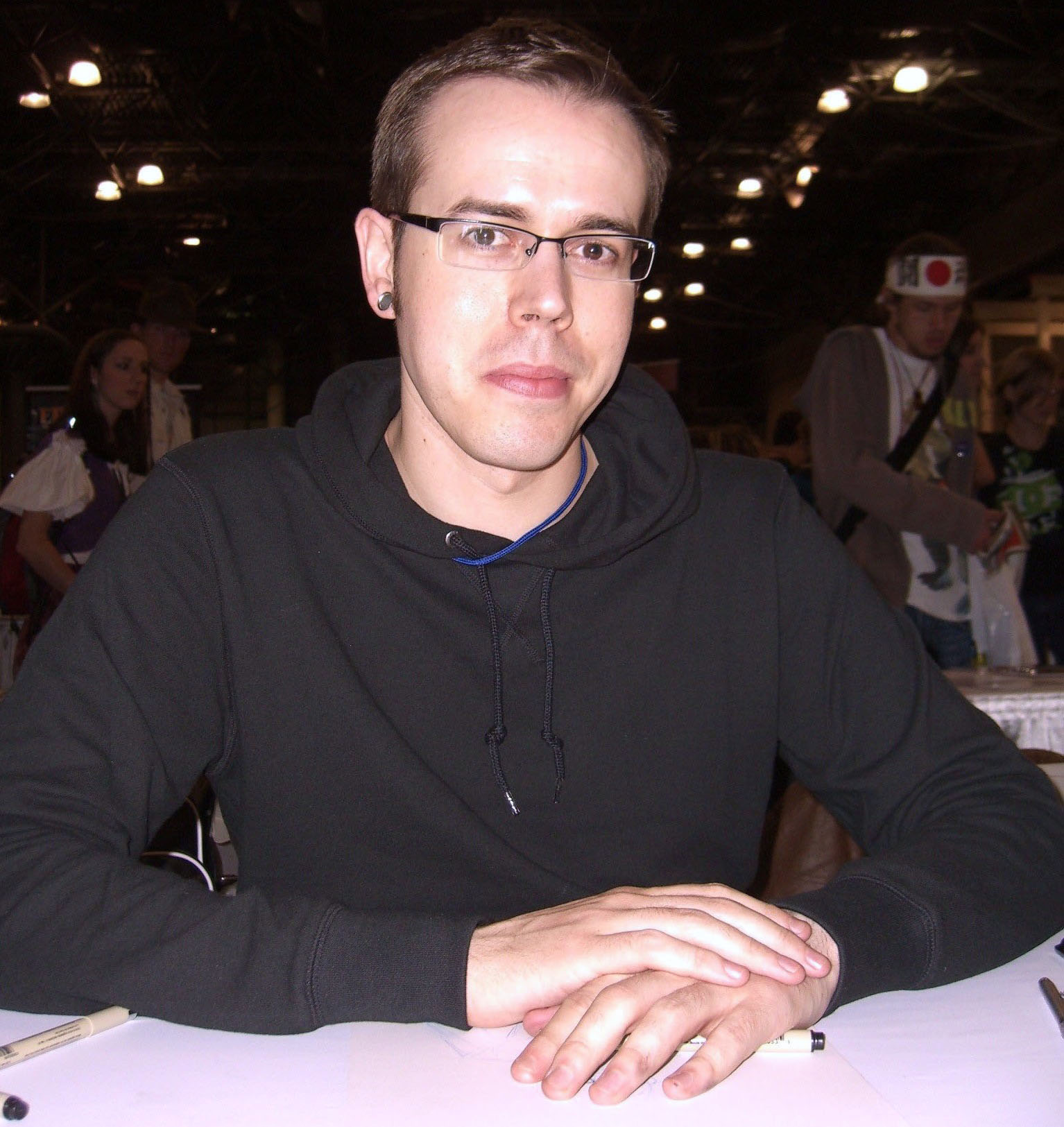
- McKelvie at the New York Comic Con 2010
- Areas: Cartoonist, Writer, Penciller, Inker, Letterer
- Notable works: The Wicked + The Divine; Long Hot Summer; Phonogram; Young Avengers

Jamie McKelvie is a British cartoonist and illustrator, known for his both work on books such as Phonogram, Young Avengers and The Wicked + The Divine, and his approach to comic character design.

== Career ==
Since 2003, McKelvie has collaborated with Kieron Gillen on a number of works. This started with a comic strip for PlayStation Official Magazine – UK, entitled Save Point, which ran for at least three years. The Guardian highlighted that Gillen and McKelvie "met in 2003 at a convention where Gillen was selling his first photocopied comics". Their first comic book together was Phonogram, a six-issue series in 2006, which was followed by two sequel series in 2008 and 2015 with Matt Wilson. The three worked together on a relaunch of Young Avengers for Marvel in 2013, and created the 45-issue series The Wicked + The Divine between 2014 and 2019. In 2021, GamesRadar+ highlighted that the duo has "worked together on-and-off for the past 17 years" and that their Batman short story Batman: Black and White #5 was their "first major project together since the conclusion of The Wicked + The Divine in 2019".

His first creator-owned series as both writer and artist, Suburban Glamour, was published in 2008, with Guy Major and Matthew Wilson as colourists. He has done various work for Marvel Comics, including a run on Defenders with Matt Fraction, and the X-Men: Season One graphic novel with Dennis Hopeless.

McKelvie's artwork also graces the covers of the Art Brut album Brilliant! Tragic! and the single "Lost Weekend", and of two novels by writer Mur Lafferty. He has illustrated prints and tour posters for the band Chvrches and his art was animated in their music video for the new version of "Bury It" (2016) featuring Hayley Williams.

=== Character design ===
McKelvie has redesigned a number of characters' costumes, including the 2012 redesign of long-time character Carol Danvers, for a relaunch of the character as the new Captain Marvel, and in late 2013, the design for Kamala Khan's outfit when she becomes Ms Marvel. In 2016, he designed the costumes for the time-displaced original five X-Men seen in X-Men: Blue (2017). In 2023, he redesigned Kamala's costume after she joined the X-Men. He has also made available his personal takes on Wonder Woman, Iron Man and Cyclops.

McKelvie has said that he emphasises practicality when creating his Marvel designs, stating that he considers the "message a [...] character's design is putting across", and specifically for Ms. Marvel, the design reflects "the Captain Marvel legacy, and also her story and her background". For the time-displaced X-Men, McKelvie commented that he "wanted to reference past incarnations of the characters, while at the same time coming up with something new and cohesive for the team".

== Works ==
=== Comics ===
==== Interior work ====
- "Loss" (with writer Amber Benson, in Four Letter Worlds, 144 pages, Image Comics, April 2005, ISBN 1-58240-439-9)
- Long Hot Summer (with Eric Stephenson, graphic novel, 96 pages, Image Comics, September 2005, ISBN 1-58240-559-X)
- Phonogram (with Kieron Gillen, three volume limited series, Image Comics, 2006, 2009, 2015): collected as:
  - Rue Britannia (collects Vol 1 #1–6 (2006), tpb, 144 pages, ISBN 1-58240-694-4)
  - The Singles Club (collects Vol 2 #1–7 (2009), tpb, 160 pages, ISBN 1-60706-179-1)
  - The Immaterial Girl (collects Vol 3 #1–6 (2016), tpb, 168 pages, ISBN 1-63215-679-2)
  - The Complete Phonogram, (collects Vol 1, 2 and 3 (2017) hb, 504 pages, ISBN 1-53430-151-8)
- Suburban Glamour (script and art, 4-issue mini-series, Image Comics, October 2007. tpb, 104 pages, Image, April 2008, ISBN 1-58240-878-5)
- "Migas" (with writer Matt Fraction, Nightcrawler story in X-Men: Divided We Stand No. 1, comics anthology, Marvel Comics, June 2008)
- Cable (with writer Duane Swierczynski, issues 11 and 12, Marvel Comics, 2009): collected within:
  - X-Force/Cable: Messiah War (collects X-Men: The Times and Life of Lucas Bishop #1–3, Cable #11–15, X-Force #14–16, X-Force/Cable: Messiah War One-Shot and X-Men: Future History – The Messiah War Sourcebook, tpb, 336 pages, ISBN 0785131736)
- Gotham Gazette (part, with writer Fabian Nicieza, issues Batman Dead? No. 1 and Batman Alive? No. 1, DC Comics): collected within:
  - Batman: Battle for the Cowl (collects Gotham Gazette: Batman Dead? #1, Batman: Battle for the Cowl #1–3, Gotham Gazette: Batman Alive? #1, tpb, 160 pages, ISBN 1-4012-2416-4)
- SIEGE Loki (with writer Kieron Gillen, one shot (April 2010), Marvel Comics): collected within:
  - Siege: Thor (collects Thor 607–610, Siege: Loki and New Mutants 11, tpb, 144 pages, ISBN 0-78514-814-0)
- Ultimate Comics: Spider-Man (with writer Brian Michael Bendis, Co-Artist Issue 150, Marvel Comics)
- Invincible Iron Man (with writer Matt Fraction, back up stories in issues 32 and 33, Marvel Comics)
- Generation Hope (with writer Kieron Gillen, issues 5 and 9, Marvel Comics): collected within:
  - The Future's a Four Letter Word (collects #1–5, tpb, 120 pages, ISBN 0-78514-719-5)
  - Schism (collects #6–12, tpb, 168 pages ISBN 0-78515-242-3)
- Secret Avengers (with writer Warren Ellis, issue 16, Marvel Comics, August 2011): collected within
  - Run The Mission, Don't Get Seen, Save The World (collects #16–21, tpb, 144 pages, ISBN 0-78515-255-5)
- X-Men Season One (with writer Dennis Hopeless, graphic novel, 136 pages, Marvel Comics, March 2012, ISBN 0-78515-645-3)
- Defenders (with writer Matt Fraction, issues 8–11): collected within
  - Volume 2 (collects #7–12, tpb, 136 pages, ISBN 0-78515-853-7)
- Marvel Now Point One (part, with Kieron Gillen, Marvel Comics, 2012)
- Young Avengers (with Kieron Gillen and Matt Wilson, Marvel Comics, 2013-4): collected as:
  - Style > Substance (collects #1–5, tpb, 128 pages, ISBN 0-78516-708-0)
  - Alternative Cultures (collects #6–10, tpb, 112 pages, ISBN 0-78516-709-9)
  - Mic-Drop at the Edge of Time and Space (collects #11–15, tpb, 112 pages, ISBN 0-78518-530-5)
  - Omnibus (collects #1–15, hb, 360 pages, ISBN 0-78519-171-2)
- The Wicked + The Divine (with Kieron Gillen and Matt Wilson, Image Comics, 2014–2019): collected as:
  - The Faust Act (collects #1–5, tpb, 180 pages, ISBN 978-1-63215-019-6)
  - Fandemonium (Collects #6–11, tpb, 200 pages, ISBN 978-1-63215-327-2)
  - Commercial Suicide (Collects #12–17, tpb, 200 pages, ISBN 978-1-63215-631-0)
  - Rising Action (Collects #18–22, tpb, 168 pages, ISBN 978-1-63215-631-0)
  - Imperial Phase (Part 1) (Collects #23–28, tpb, 200 pages, ISBN 978-1-63215-631-0)
  - Imperial Phase (Part 2) (collects #29-33, tpb, 168 pages, 2018, ISBN 1534304738)
  - Mothering Invention (collects #34-39, tpb, 208 pages, 2018, ISBN 9781534308404)
  - Old is the New New (collects all specials, tpb, 232 pages, 2019, ISBN 1534308806)
  - Okay (collects #40-45, tpb, 168 pages, 2019, ISBN 1534312498)
- "The Riddle" (with writer Kieron Gillen, in Batman Black and White vol. 5 #5, 8 pages, DC Comics, April 2021

==== Cover work ====
- Hack/Slash No. 11 (alternative cover)
- Captain Marvel No. 7, 9
- Ms. Marvel No. 1 (alternative cover), No. 2-9
- Nightcrawler (2014–) No. 2, 3, 4, 5, 7
- [Revolutionary War: Omega] (2014), No. 1
- The Fuse No. 3 (alternative cover)

=== Games ===
- Kudos 2, Positech Games
