= The Wicked + The Divine =

2014 comic book series

- Promotional art by Jamie McKelvie

Publication information
- Publisher: Image Comics
- Schedule: Monthly
- Format: Ongoing series
- Genre: Dark fantasy, contemporary fantasy
- Publication date: June 2014 – September 2019
- No. of issues: 51 (45 regular and six specials)

Creative team
- Created by: Kieron Gillen; Jamie McKelvie
- Written by: Kieron Gillen
- Artist: Jamie McKelvie
- Letterer: Clayton Cowles
- Colorist: Matt Wilson
- Editor: Chrissy Williams

Collected editions
- The Faust Act: ISBN 978-1-63215-019-6
- Fandemonium: ISBN 978-1-63215-327-2
- Commercial Suicide: ISBN 978-1-63215-631-0
- Rising Action: ISBN 978-1-63215-913-7
- Imperial Phase (Part 1): ISBN 978-1-5343-0185-6
- Imperial Phase (Part 2): ISBN 978-1-5343-0473-4
- Mothering Invention: ISBN 978-1-5343-0840-4
- Old Is The New New: ISBN 978-1-5343-0880-0
- "Okay": ISBN 978-1-5343-1249-4

The Wicked + The Divine is a contemporary fantasy comic book series created by Kieron Gillen and Jamie McKelvie, and published by Image Comics. The series is largely influenced by pop music and various mythological deities, and includes the themes of life and death in the story. The comic has received positive reviews, and was the winner of Best Comic at the 2014 British Comic Awards. It has also been noted for its diverse portrayal of ethnicity, sexuality and gender social roles.

== Premise ==
The narrative follows a young teenage girl, Laura, as she interacts with the Pantheon, a group of twelve people who discover that they are reincarnated deities. This discovery grants them fame and supernatural powers, with the stipulation that they will die within two years as part of a ninety-year cycle known as the Recurrence.

== Publication history ==
The series was announced on 9 January 2014, and the first issue was released in June 2014. The series ran for 45 main issues, four one-shot specials, one Christmas special, and one comedy special. It is collected in nine trade paperback volumes (with the specials collected as volume 8), five hardcover volumes (with two volumes packaged together as Book Four), and one compendium. A one-shot crossover, entitled I Hate Fairyland – I Hate Image, was released in October 2017.

Writer Kieron Gillen's original and core inspiration for The Wicked + The Divine was his father's diagnosis with terminal cancer. For this reason, Gillen considers the story to be "about life and death." Further inspiration for Gillen comes from pop music and various pop idols; the Pantheon is based on pop idols, and Gillen has created a playlist of songs to accompany the comic book.

In 2015, it was announced that the television rights had been optioned by Universal TV, but as of June 2024, Gillen confirmed that the rights had returned to the creators and were once again being shopped around. In June 2024, for the tenth anniversary of the series, Gillen and McKelvie launched a Kickstarter to produce a hardcover art book titled The Wicked + The Divine: The Covers Version. This book will contain the original 126 covers in a super-sized format along with extra material from Gillen and McKelvie such as bonus Sahkmet head cover.

== Plot ==
The narrative focuses on a group of people with superhuman powers known as "The Pantheon". Each member of The Pantheon was at one point a normal person before being chosen to merge with the spirit of a deity. It is said that each member of the Pantheon will not live more than two years from being chosen, and that every 90 years the Pantheon is reincarnated. This cycle is known as the Recurrence. The person who is the next reincarnation of a particular god does not get the opportunity to refuse the transformation.

== Characters ==
- Laura Wilson – The series' narrator and protagonist. A 17-year-old multiracial teenager who lives in Brockley, Laura is a "fangirl" of the Pantheon, often having to stifle her true emotions in their presence and ready to sacrifice everything to be associated with the Pantheon. After attending a performance by Amaterasu, she meets several members of the Pantheon for the first time and befriends Lucifer. While all previous Pantheons have consisted of twelve gods, Laura is revealed to possibly be the first thirteenth member, Persephone. This was later debunked by the appearance of Persephone in the 1920s Recurrence, which means that she may be the last god to be incarnated as referenced by Ananke's sister, which means that in previous Pantheons, either she went unseen by other members of the Pantheon or she was killed immediately by Minerva or Ananke. She becomes the first member of the Pantheon ever to see through the trap of godhood, give it up and help her surviving peers do the same. She's sentenced for killing Ananke, but serves her time and later marries Cassandra. In the year 2055, she calls her peers together for Cassandra's funeral and gives the reader some final advice.
- Laura's Family – Laura's mother, father and sister Jenny. Originally not knowing of Laura's secret other life as a friend of the Pantheon, they eventually find out when she is thrust into the spotlight, and learn to support her lifestyle. Killed by Ananke who frames Baphomet for the murder. The fact that Ananke killed Jenny without even realising motivates Laura to kill Ananke.
- Beth – Originally one of Cassandra's interns, she is fired after leaking Cassandra and Laura's location to Baal and sets out on her own, with a grudge. She eventually joins Wōden, taking the name Nike. After being controlled by Minerva she still wants godhood and is knocked out by Robin, then arrested with the others.
- Robin and Toni – Beth's new camera team, operating in the same capacity Beth once did to Cassandra. Working for Wōden in the final phase of his plans, she as Phobos and he as Eros. They leave after being freed from Minerva's control, only to be arrested.
- The Valkyries – A group of tall, beautiful, Asian women almost always accompanying Wōden. Kerry is one of his former valkyries and went by the name Brunhilde while with him, and after attempting to kill Wōden in order to gain his power, is crippled by Minerva; she later rejoins him. Another valkyrie, Eir looks after Sakhmet. A third named valkyrie is Göndul. Controlled by Minerva in the last arc, they are freed by Dionysus and leave, only to be arrested.
- David Blake – An expert in The Pantheon who doesn't believe this generation deserves them. He works with Urðr to try and identify Luci's attackers and has a son called Jon who is one of the true gods. David works with Ananke while pretending to be Wōden. As Wōden, he is often accompanied by The Valkyries, a group of human women who are all tall, Asian, and beautiful. He constantly wears a mask to hide his appearance, which is rumoured to be hideous. He is very racist, misogynistic, and a pervert. He is killed by The Valkyries under Minerva's control.
- Minerva's mother and father – Minerva's parents live to profit from their daughter's newfound god-like status. They are killed by Ananke, during Ananke's "attack" on Minerva. They are revealed to be an unrelated couple that had been paid off by Ananke and Minerva to pose as her parents.
- Campbell Family – Valentine/Baal's parents and younger siblings Alicia and Bobby. His father was killed by the Great Darkness when Baal first became a god, convincing him to sacrifice children to stop it. The remaining family was attacked again at the same time as Minerva. Baal includes his mother in the crowd of intended sacrifices to stop the Great Darkness once and for all while Minerva watches his siblings. After the gig fails and horrified when he learns the truth, Baal lets the police pick them up.
- Tom – A fan of Persephone's who was the first to know she wanted to be known as The Destroyer. He attends Baal's final gig with his friends Nathan and Julie, finding footage of Laura on his phone after the crowd somehow survives.

=== The Pantheon ===
Every Recurrence, 12 separate gods/goddesses reincarnate into bodies of any gender. Lucifer has had the most reincarnations, appearing five times in the issues and six altogether. Minerva has appeared five times; Baal, The Morrigan, Dionysus, Inanna, Set, and Woden have appeared three times, and Amaterasu, Mimir and The Norns have appeared twice, with every other god/goddess having at least one known reincarnation. The 2010s Recurrence features the mysterious appearance of a 13th goddess, Persephone. However, it was shown during the 1920s Recurrence that Persephone also appeared, her head having been removed prior or during the events of the Recurrence. None of the other gods seemed to recognize her, which indicates either she has been killed immediately by Ananke in the past, or has been hidden by Ananke from the other gods. It has since been revealed that Minerva is not a proper god, automatically created shortly before the next Recurrence begins and working with Ananke the whole time. Thus Persephone is the proper 12th member.

Ananke appears to act along with the Pantheon, serving as their representative to the public, but is also outside of them. Unlike the others she is not a teenager and has aged, but still is able to function. She functions almost as a parent, and reveals that she gave up her divinity during an earlier cycle of The Recurrence to protect future members of The Pantheon. Although she is stern with the deities who are resurrected, she seems to have a genuine maternal connection to them, saying that she will miss them before she kills them, and crying after she does so. It is revealed she, working with Minerva, has been removing the heads of gods in the previous cycles in order to prevent the coming of the Darkness by completing a ritual using the intact heads of four gods. The gods who have had their heads removed previously do not remember having it occur in past Recurrences.

Flashbacks show that Ananke is the aged form of a previous Minerva; using the ritual, Ananke dies and Minerva takes her place (remembering every previous Recurrence in the process and taking the name Ananke). Further brief flashbacks to every Recurrence throughout history show a variety of outcomes for an Ananke awakening a Persephone. In most Ananke or Minerva kills Persephone; in several Persephone escapes or kills Ananke. A Minerva has never been shown dying so therefore the cycle of Minerva performing the ritual and replacing Ananke can continue. In one Recurrence, Minerva attempted to complete the ritual using herself in place of the fourth head; the ritual turned on her sending her into ninety years of Darkness, until the next Minerva appeared swearing to never let that happen again. The 2014 Recurrence with Laura Wilson is the first time a third party has interfered with Ananke/Minerva and Persephone's encounter.

In the final arc, Minerva reveals the truth. Ananke and her sister were part of the first group of twelve with minor talents similar to the descended Laura. Her sister discovered that labeling themselves as "gods" gave them great power, a shortcut. Though "godhood" kills one of their group after two years, Ananke found a way to cheat death by creating the Minerva role and sacrificing four heads of each generation of the twelve. All of it just to prevent the Darkness of her permanent death. She traps each generation in a story, giving them "godhood" with the name of a deity specific to each individual's flaws allowing her to manipulate and sacrifice them; while also preventing them from discovering their true power as regular humans. With no heads sacrificed in the 2010s Recurrence, and both the Ananke and the Minerva having been killed, the cycle is finally free from her corruption and cannot be repeated by anyone else. Laura and her surviving peers go on to commit to a lifetime of work, using their powers without godhood to better the world. Once they all pass away naturally, the future will be a blank slate of possibility for future generations.

2014 Recurrence

- Amaterasu – Formerly Emily Greenaway, who went by the name Hazel Oak Ash Thorn Greenaway and became Amaterasu at the age of 17. A fan of Shinto culture from her childhood, she is commonly accused of cultural appropriation. Before being transformed, she was a fan of Cassandra's writing and drew a lot of fan art. She was a close friend of Eleanor before either of them became gods. She has the ability to "step" by sunlight as a way to teleport, with Wōden giving her a machine to do it by starlight. She has a very optimistic outlook on life and tries to be kind and friendly, stating that as a god she must be an inspiration. She also cares deeply for her fellow gods and others, praying for them all. Murdered by Sakhmet slashing her throat. Amaterasu's appearance appears to be based on Florence Welch.
- Baal – Formerly Valentine Campbell. Baal was the first god to emerge from the 2014 Recurrence. He was once in a relationship with Inanna, before Inanna slept with Lucifer, which he is still hurt by. He presents himself as aggressive, but is shown to have a softer side. His powers are presented as electrical in nature, using it to make his car go faster and erect a cage of lightning. He initially claims he is Baal Hadad, but is actually the sky and fire god Baal Hammon. Tricked by Ananke and Minerva, he sacrifices children once every four months to banish the Great Darkness that killed his father. He is devastated when he realizes it's all a lie, only continuing to live to stop Minerva. Valentine gives up godhood without stating what it meant to him, and commits murder-suicide by falling from a ledge while holding Minerva. Though at first Zahid, Cassandra and Laura hate him for the children he sacrificed, in later life they see him as a tragic figure trying to protect others for the greater good. Baal is visually based on Kanye West.
- Dionysus – Formerly Umar. Has the power to produce a drug-like euphoria, with the added function to control people affected by it. He first appears as a fan during The Morrigan's gig, before he is transformed. His powers have consequences though, as he can constantly hear people's voices in his head and can't sleep. As a fan, Umar met Cameron and gave him a ride to one of The Morrigan's early gigs, Cameron would become Nergal as a result. Dionysus is declared brain-dead after Wōden takes control of a crowd of fans using Dionysus' powers, he is resurrected at the cost of Nergal's life. Umar gives up godhood along with his belief that he has to save everyone. At Cassandra's funeral it is mentioned that he was the one whom always inspired Cassandra to be kinder.
- Inanna – Formerly Zahid. They first met Laura at the original Ragnarock before their transformation, where they blended in and mostly went ignored. Their personality changed when they were transformed, becoming more outgoing and confident. They were also a fan of Cassandra's writing. They run a Residencies which can go on for weeks at a time and frequently turn into orgies. In the early days of godhood, they were in a relationship with Baal, which ended when Inanna slept with Lucifer. Their powers included Divination and "stepping" (teleporting) by starlight. Inanna is murdered by Ananke, who frames the murder on Baphomet, and who keeps their head alive in order to complete her ritual. Inanna takes the body of Gentle Annie after Ananke is killed. Zahid gives up godhood, which they previously believed was the only way they could stand out. They miss Valentine for the rest of their life. Though disgusted at what Valentine did, they reason only someone full of love to protect others could have gone through with it. Cassandra mentions she is glad to have known Zahid. In the final issue, Zahid uses they/them pronouns. Innana is based on Prince.
- Lucifer – Formerly Eleanor Rigby (a reference to the Beatles song of the same name), she is turned into Lucifer at the age of 18. She first meets Laura after an Amaterasu concert and offers Laura divinity in exchange for her help. She enjoys rebelling against authority and has a desire for people to notice her, which being on stage allows her to indulge in. Her powers appear to be fire-based, often demonstrated by causing explosions and lighting cigarettes. Killed by Ananke, her head is kept alive in order to complete the ritual. She takes the body of Badb after being freed from Ananke. Initially refusing to give up godhood, Laura makes her see her dream of being on stage isn't worth it and she becomes Eleanor again. Decades later, she and Laura had tried a relationship but it didn't work out. She was never friends with Cassandra but they gained a mutual respect for each other. Eleanor is still sarcastic but gets along well with the rest of her peers later in life. Luci is visually inspired by David Bowie.
- Minerva – The youngest member of the Pantheon at 12 years old, she is kept away from important discussions by the others despite her desire to be involved. It is indicated that the reason Minerva is so young is that as a virgin goddess, her hosts can only be virgins themselves. This seems to be supported by the fact that her previous incarnation in the 1920s was also a young girl. Her supposed parents appear to control her every move, living with her in Valhalla; though they are just unrelated people paid off by Ananke and Minerva in a ruse. She is secretly not one of the gods but is a part of Ananke's form of immortality. Ananke is an older version of a previous Minerva, and they consider themselves one. They have separate minds until they enact the Ritual and Ananke is killed, whereupon Minerva gains the knowledge of all her previous incarnations. She uses technology similar the Valkyries when she needs to pose as a performing god. She reveals the truth to the surviving members of the twelve when her plans are foiled, and she is killed by Valentine when he deliberately falls from a great height with her, killing them both. Minerva's look is based on the military-style costumes often worn by pop stars such as The Beatles, Queen, My Chemical Romance, The Libertines, Manic Street Preachers and Cheryl.
- Mimir – Formerly Jon Blake. He is turned into a god against his will and imprisoned by Ananke and his father David. David pretends to be the god Wōden while he secretly forces his son to build things for Ananke and his own plans. When Jon's head is freed from Ananke, he takes The Morrigan's body. Jon gives up godhood, the only way he could make sense of what his father did to him. Jon never stopped working and built many advanced technologies for the world. He may be in a relationship with Aruna, having made her a robotic body. John was one of Cassandra's closest friends later in life. Visually based on Daft Punk.
- The Morrígan – Formerly Marian. Out of her love for her former boyfriend Cameron, she requests Ananke turn him into a god. She appears in three incarnations, which have so far been named as "Badb", "Gentle Annie" (possibly Anand), and simply "Morrígan" (The Morrígan). Her personality depends on which incarnation she is in: Gentle Annie is more kind, while Badb is overly aggressive. Her powers include summoning crows as a weapon and, as Gentle Annie, she can heal. If a person tries to capture The Morrígan on camera, they will see a vision of a loved one dying. Gentle Annie sacrifices their life to bring back Nergal after Badb kills him. Two of the twelve being as close as Marian and Cameron were before discovering their abilities is rare, but Ananke/Minerva used that to her advantage. Visually, the Morrigan is based on PJ Harvey, Kate Bush, Patti Smith, Siouxsie Sioux and KatieJane Garside.
- Nergal – Formerly Cameron. After his parents died, he became withdrawn from Marian and cheated on her, but she later forgave him and asked for him to be transformed. The character goes by the name Baphomet (Baph), but in the 20th issue, he reveals to Persephone (and Urðr) that he is actually the incarnation of the god Nergal. He is very sarcastic and snide as an attempt to hide his immense insecurities, particularly his fear of death. He can summon the spirits of the dead. He is killed by Badb but resurrected by Gentle Annie at the cost of Marian's triple lives. He figures out Marian meant for them to constantly die to each resurrect the other one, but Laura convinces him to break free of the abuse and instead use the three bodies as new hosts for the heads of the other gods. Before facing Minerva, he becomes brain-dead in order to bring back Dionysus. Mentioned as deceased in the far future of 2055. He is based upon Nick Cave and Andrew Eldritch.
- Persephone – Formerly Laura Wilson. She appears at the end of the 11th issue when Ananke transforms her into a seemingly new member of the Pantheon. Her powers include summoning vines that burst out the ground and showing past events to others. She was formerly pregnant with either Baal Haamon or Nergal's child. She realizes she isn't a god and becomes human again; though she can still somehow summon fire and has limited performance powers. Laura is the first to descend and give up godhood, helping the others to see the truth. She is arrested and put on trial for the murder of Ananke, and after serving her sentence marries Cassandra. In 2055 she gathers everyone for Cassandra's funeral and gives the reader parting words that the future is theirs to make: a blank slate of possibility.
- Sakhmet – Formerly Ruth Clarkson. She admired Egyptian culture from a young age. Before Ananke found her, it was hinted she was homeless, an alcoholic, and that her father abused her. When sober, she becomes murderous and cannibalistic and can only be calmed down with alcohol. Her behaviour is very catlike and she is one of the Pantheon's best fighters. She is killed by Minerva. Sakhmet is visually based on Rihanna as well as Gillen's cat.
- Tara – Formerly Aruna. From a young age, she suffered abuse and sexualization from all around her. She does not know which specific goddess "Tara" she is supposed to be an incarnation of (there are three options – a Buddhist Tara, a Hindu Tara, and a Polynesian Tara) and is plagued by abuse and derision from the public for refusing to perform miracles during her performances, instead performing music she wrote before her transformation. She constantly receives rape threats and death threats, and begs Ananke to end her life and torment. She is very dismissive and withdrawn from the other gods. After hers and the others' disembodied heads are rescued, she volunteers not to take a body, to escape the objectification she faced before. Even as a head, Tara has the miracle of turning into a giantess in battle. Aruna gives up her godhood; but survives as a living head, later being given a robotic body by Jon, whom she may be in a relationship with. Cassandra mentions Aruna's never committing a crime let her campaign for leniency for the rest of the survivors. Tara is inspired by Lady Gaga and Taylor Swift as well as 1950's science fiction.
- Urðr – Before her transformation, Urðr was Cassandra Igarashi, a trans woman, reporter, and a cynical skeptic of the Pantheon's supernatural origins. As Urðr, she is revealed to be the 12th member of the Pantheon, and appears along with her two sisters Verðandi and Skuld, formerly her camera crew members Meredith and Zoe. Together, the three form The Norns. Urðr was not affected by any of the other gods' music apart from Persephone's; until she and Dionysus found a way for her to hear and feel his. Cassandra gives up godhood; while she always thought the Pantheon's miracles were lies, she wanted to prove it by using miracles and didn't see the contradiction until the true nature of the twelve is revealed. The surviving members agree to her plan to be arrested after the events. Cassandra passes away at the age of sixty-five in the year 2055, as Laura's wife. The survivors of the Pantheon gather for her funeral as a hologram of Cassandra explains what each of them meant to her. While Meredith and Zoe were never certain they were truly part of the group, Laura thanks them for what they meant to Cassandra. Cassandra says they left her speechless every day she was with them.
Previous Recurrences

1922 Recurrence

This Recurrence ended on 31 December 1923. Unusually, the twelve gods all lived close to the end of the Recurrence, forcing Ananke to take drastic measures to complete the ceremony to stop the Great Darkness. It is revealed that Ananke has found and imprisoned the creature that Woden merged with in the previous Recurrence in the lighthouse near Lucifer's island. This issue ends with the events of the first issue of the comic.

- Amaterasu – A goddess based on silent-era film actresses like Louise Brooks, whose miracles involve impersonation and screen projection. She kills Baal using a projection of a steam train. She is killed by Amon-Ra in a suicide pact. She is later reincarnated in the next recurrence.
- Amun Ra – A god based on Langston Hughes and other Harlem Renaissance-era artists. He is in love with Amaterasu. He is killed by Susanoo in suicide pact. Not reincarnated since this Recurrence.
- Baal – A god based on T. S. Eliot and Ezra Pound, he is in alliance with Set to plunge the world into darkness and preserve the cultural dominance of literature. He is killed by Amaterasu. Not reincarnated since this Recurrence.
- Dionysus – A god based on Pablo Picasso during his Cubist period, and as such is a living embodiment of the movement. He dies by a laser rigged by Wōden. He is later reincarnated in the next Recurrence.
- Lucifer – A god based on F. Scott Fitzgerald, who lives on an island mansion attended only by a magical projection of a butler. He is murdered by Set. He is later reincarnated in the next Recurrence.
- Minerva – A goddess based on Shirley Temple, she is more upbeat and immature, and often has to be shielded when her fellow gods are murdered. She is aware of Ananke's ritual and obtains the heads of Set and Susanoo to complete it. She kills Ananke and takes her place, obtaining the power of the Ritual. She lives till the 2010s Recurrence, which would have made her 87 years old at this time, and 30 years old at the time of her conversation with author Robert Graves.
- The Morrigan – A god based on James Joyce. He speaks of himself in the third person in a mixture of script and prose format. He is murdered by Ananke to draw the surviving Pantheon members towards the rebels, with his head the second used for the Ritual. He is later reincarnated in the next Recurrence.
- Neptune – A god based on Ernest Hemingway, and visually resembling Captain Nemo. Despite being a sea god, he is unable to swim. He dies by Baal drowning him. Not reincarnated since this Recurrence.
- The Norns – Three gods based on George Orwell, H.G. Wells, and Aldous Huxley. Verðandi is murdered for not wanting to join in the darkness plan. Skuld and Urðr are later killed by Set. They are later reincarnated in the next Recurrence.
- Set – A goddess based on Virginia Woolf and other members of the Bloomsbury Group. She mentions previous incarnations having taken place during the reign of Ramses II and during the life of Jesus, similar to Woolf's character Orlando. She is killed by Minerva, with her head the third used for the Ritual. Not reincarnated since this Recurrence.
- Susanoo – A god based on silent-era film comedians like Buster Keaton and Harold Lloyd, who is attracted to his "sister" Amaterasu. He is decapitated by Minerva after the suicide pact for the fourth head of the Ritual. Not reincarnated since this Recurrence.
- Wōden – A god based on Joseph Goebbels, who appears to have vast mechanical and technological powers, only to be revealed to be a sham god and a fraud, likely by draining Mimir, whose head he keeps in a box. Both Mimir and Wōden are killed by Ananke. The circumstances are repeated by David and Jon Blake in the next Recurrence.
- Persephone – A goddess based on Josephine Baker. Her head was removed by Ananke in 1922, a year before the events on Lucifer's island, as the first head used for the Ritual.

1830 Recurrence

This Recurrence ended on 19 March 1831.

- Hades – A god based on John Keats. Ravaged by illness, he is killed by Ananke with his body then taken by Lucifer and The Morrígan to attempt a resurrection. Not reincarnated since this Recurrence.
- Hestia – A goddess possibly based on Jane Austen. She is consumed by a pride of suitors at a ball. Not reincarnated since this Recurrence.
- Inanna – A goddess based on Mary Shelley's step-sister Claire Clairmont. In return for godhood, she kills Wōden's children. The last survivor of this Recurrence, her head was removed by Ananke at the conclusion of the Recurrence. According to the 1831 creature, Inanna was a plagiarist who used stolen power. It's revealed in Kieron Gillen's Writer's Notes that she was a false god who drew power from the necklace she wore; similar to both of the Wōdens in the following two Recurrences. Reincarnated next in the 2010s Recurrence.
- Lucifer – A god based on the poet Lord Byron, who does not want to accept his fate. He is killed by a creature of his own making while attempting to resurrect Hades. Next reincarnated in the 1920s Recurrence.
- Morpheus – A god possibly based on Samuel Taylor Coleridge. He dies explaining a vision. Not reincarnated since this Recurrence.
- The Morrígan – A god based on the poet Percy Shelley, who feels isolated from his cold wife, Wōden. He is killed by a creature of his own making while attempting to resurrect Hades. Next reincarnated in the 1920s Recurrence.
- Perun – A god possibly based on Alexander Pushkin. He dies in Petersburg. Not reincarnated since this Recurrence.
- Thoth – A god possibly based on Edgar Allan Poe. He is killed by an ape stealing his heart. Not reincarnated since this Recurrence.
- Wōden – A goddess based on the author Mary Shelley, made bitter by the death of her three children. To save Inanna, she merges with the creature created by Lucifer and The Morrígan. The name is next used in the 1920s Recurrence. Thus far, this is the only Recurrence of Wōden that has not included a link to Mimir. She is killed by Baal as a mercy in 2015.
- Unknown god who went by 'The Angel of Soho', Urizen, Enitharmon, and Orc. These are all characters from William Blake's mythology.
- Unknown goddesses described as 'The Three Lonely Sisters of the Parsonage', possibly the Brontë sisters.
- 1 Unknown god/goddess deceased by the end of the Recurrence. Likely a Minerva who murders Ananke and takes her persona. She lives until the 1923 Cycle, which would have made her 92 at the time of her death.
- Persephone – Her head is removed by Ananke in Paris, France in 1830.

1738 Recurrence

- 11 unknown gods and goddess dead by the end of the cycle.
- Minerva – the Ananke of the 1830s cycle.
- Persephone – killed in 1738 by Ananke in North America. She attempted to attack Ananke while her head was being removed from her body.

1371 Recurrence

This Recurrence takes place in France, a few decades after the plague known as The Black Death. Ended on 2 March 1373.

- 10 unknown gods and goddesses are dead by the end of the cycle.
- Lucifer – a nun who maintained control after exceeding her 2 years. She kills Ananke who admits to creating the plague; Lucifer then allows godhood to consume her. Next known reincarnation in the 1830s Recurrence.
- Minerva – a girl with skin deformities. She recruits people for Ananke to transform into gods. She watches Lucifer and Ananke burn, then leaves with a sack of heads.
- Persephone – head removed by Ananke in 1371.

453 Recurrence

This Recurrence occurs during the second Sack of Rome in 455 AD. Ended on 16 August 455 AD.

- Baal – A Carthaginian whom Geiseric mentions seeing perform and who was later killed. Next known reincarnation in the 1920s Recurrence.
- Dionysus/Bacchus – A lover of Lucifer who relates more to the Roman god Bacchus than Dionysus. Lucifer wishes he was with him at the end of his life. Next known reincarnation in the 1920s Recurrence.
- Inanna – Married Attila the Hun and killed him during sex, stopping his rise. Next known reincarnation in the 1830s Recurrence.
- Lucifer – A lower actor made god, he calls himself Julius Caesar when he rejects his godhood. The last survivor of this Recurrence, he is killed by unknown causes. (It's inferred later in the story as his use of godhood and miracles burn him out after two years of time). The next known reincarnation is the 1370s Recurrence.
- Mithras – According to Ananke, he died by feeding his flesh to a legion. Not known to have reincarnated since this Recurrence.
- Minerva – According to Ananke, she is lost in an attempt at finding the Alexandrian Library. She would have actually survived due to the fact that each Minerva kills the previous Ananke and takes on Ananke's memories and persona. Next known reincarnation in the 1370s Recurrence.
- Morai – According to Ananke, their fate was predetermined. Not known to have reincarnated since this Recurrence.
- Persephone – head removed in Germania by Ananke during 454 AD, a year before Lucifer dies.
- 5 unknown gods/goddesses deceased by the end of the Recurrence.

List of All Recurrences

This is a list of all Recurrences and the time and place they occurred. Unless otherwise stated the Persephone ends each cycle with her head being removed. The only two Persephones to actually kill Ananke were the 2483 BC incarnation (where she used the vines to destroy Ananke's head) and the 820 AD incarnation (where Persephone cut Ananke in half and ran away).

4000 BC – The first successful Recurrence, of which Ananke corrupts and makes the rules with her Sister thus creating the first Minerva.

3862 BC – Recurrence takes place in the Upper Nile Valley.

3770 BC – Recurrence takes place in Mesopotamia.

3678 BC – Recurrence takes place in the Indus Valley.

3586 BC – Recurrence takes place along the Yellow River.

3495 BC – Recurrence takes place in Uruk in Sumer. Persephone fought back against Ananke during this Recurrence, injuring her shoulder, but had part of her head removed in the attempt.

3403 BC – Recurrence takes place in the Fortaleza Valley in Peru.

3311 BC – Recurrence takes place in Western Europe.

3219 BC – Second Recurrence to take place in the Indus Valley.

3128 BC – Recurrence takes place in Egypt. This Minerva could only gather three heads and was swallowed by the Ritual until the next Recurrence.

3036 BC – Recurrence takes place in Crete. No Ananke in the cycle. Persephone killed by Minerva.

2942 BC – Recurrence takes place in Japan.

2849 BC – Recurrence takes place in Northern China.

2757 BC – Second Recurrence to take place in Egypt.

2666 BC – Second Recurrence to take place in Northern China.

2574 BC – Third Recurrence to take place in Egypt. Persephone fought back, impaling Ananke with her vines.

2483 BC – Recurrence takes place on Wrangel Island in the Arctic Ocean. Persephone obliterated Ananke's head.

2391 BC – Recurrence takes place in Harappa in the area known as Pakistan today.

2299 BC – Recurrence takes place around the city of Akkad.

2207 BC – Recurrence takes place in the British Isles.

2115 BC – Recurrence takes place in Canaan.

2024 BC – Third Recurrence to take place in Northern China.

1932 BC – Recurrence takes place in Australasia.

1840 BC – Fourth Recurrence to take place in Egypt.

1748 BC – Recurrence takes place in Babylon. Persephone's head is removed at the same time she kills Ananke with her vines.

1657 BC – Recurrence takes place in North America.

1565 BC – Fourth Recurrence to take place in Northern China.

1473 BC – Recurrence takes place in Northern Indus Valley region.

1381 BC – Recurrence takes place in Central America.

1289 BC – Fifth Recurrence to take place in Egypt, during the reign of Ramses the II. Persephone fought back against Ananke. Set is also known to have appeared during this Recurrence.

1197 BC – Recurrence takes place around Hattusa during the Hittite Empire. This Persephone also fought back against Ananke.

1106 BC – Recurrence takes place in Greece.

1014 BC – Recurrence takes place in Central China. Persephone attempted to fight, but had part of her head removed.

922 BC – Recurrence takes place in Assyria.

830 BC – Recurrence takes place in Carthage.

739 BC – Fifth Recurrence to take place in Northern China.

647 BC – Recurrence takes place in Persia. Persephone attempted to fight before removal of her head.

555 BC – Recurrence takes place in Eastern India.

463 BC – Recurrence takes place in Athens, Greece.

372 BC – Recurrence takes place in Macedonia.

280 BC – Second Recurrence to take place in Central India. Persephone appears to escape under ground.

188 BC – Recurrence takes place in Eastern China.

96 BC – Recurrence takes place in Etruria.

4 BC – Recurrence takes place in Judea. Lucifer and Set also participate.

88 AD – Recurrence takes place in Teotihuacan.

181 AD – Recurrence takes place in South East Asia.

271 AD – Second Recurrence takes place in Eastern China.

364 AD – Recurrence takes place in Eastern Europe.

453 AD – Recurrence takes place in Ancient Rome. 454 – Persephone is killed by Ananke in Germania. 2 August 455 – Lucifer, the last surviving god, takes over Rome. 16 August 455 – Lucifer dies.

546 AD – Recurrence takes place in Tikal.

637 AD – Recurrence takes place in Iraq.

729 AD – Recurrence takes place in Constantinople.

820 AD – Recurrence takes place in Francia. Persephone cuts Ananke in half before escaping.

912 AD – Sixth Recurrence to take place in Egypt. Persephone killed by Minerva.

1003 AD – Second Recurrence to take place in Japan.

1095 AD – Recurrence takes place in Syria.

1187 AD – Recurrence takes place in Jerusalem.

1279 AD – Sixth Recurrence to take place in Northern China.

1371 AD – Recurrence takes place in France.

1463 AD – Recurrence takes place in West Africa.

1554 AD – Recurrence takes place in Cusco.

1646 AD – Third Recurrence to take place in Japan.

1738 AD – Second Recurrence to take place in North America.

1830 AD – Second Recurrence to take place in France.

1922 – Third Recurrence to take place in North America.

2014 – Recurrence takes place in Great Britain.

It is shown that Persephone has appeared in each Recurrence since 3682 BC, where she was incarnated by Ananke. Ananke encourages her to sing, and as she does Ananke takes her head off. Since that time, 65 Recurrences have happened. The most Recurrences have happened in Egypt and Northern China.

== Reception ==
The Wicked + the Divine has received generally positive reviews. The review aggregation website Comic Book Roundup reports that the series holds an average score of 8.6 out of 10.

=== Awards ===
The Wicked + the Divine was the winner of Best Comic at the 2014 British Comic Awards. The series has also been nominated for the 2015 Eisner Awards in three categories: Best New Series, Best Cover Artist, and Best Coloring. In 2018, it was nominated for the Eisner Awards in the Best Continuing Series category.

== Collected editions ==
The entire series has been collected as nine trade paperback (TPB) volumes, four deluxe hardcovers (HC), and a compendium:

Title	Material collected	Release date	ISBN
The Wicked + The Divine Vol 1: The Faust Act	The Wicked + The Divine #1–5	12 November 2014	ISBN 978-1-63215-019-6
The Wicked + The Divine Vol 2: Fandemonium	The Wicked + The Divine #6–11	1 July 2015	ISBN 978-1-63215-327-2
The Wicked + The Divine Vol 3: Commercial Suicide	The Wicked + The Divine #12–17	3 February 2016	ISBN 978-1-63215-631-0
The Wicked + The Divine Vol 4: Rising Action	The Wicked + The Divine #18–22	5 October 2016	ISBN 978-1-63215-913-7
The Wicked + The Divine Vol 5: Imperial Phase (Part 1)	The Wicked + The Divine #23–28	7 June 2017	ISBN 978-1-5343-0185-6
The Wicked + The Divine Vol 6: Imperial Phase (Part 2)	The Wicked + The Divine #29–33	10 January 2018	ISBN 978-1-5343-0473-4
The Wicked + The Divine Vol 7: Mothering Invention	The Wicked + The Divine #34–39	9 October 2018	ISBN 978-1-5343-0840-4
The Wicked + The Divine Vol 8: Old is the New New	The Wicked + The Divine 455 A.D., 1373 A.D., 1831 A.D., 1923 A.D., Christmas Annual and The Funnies	12 March 2019	ISBN 978-1-5343-0880-0
The Wicked + The Divine Vol 9: "Okay"	The Wicked + The Divine #40–45	2 October 2019	ISBN 978-1-5343-1249-4

Title	Material collected	Release date	ISBN
The Wicked + The Divine Book One	The Wicked + The Divine #1–11	6 April 2016	ISBN 978-1-63215-728-7
The Wicked + The Divine Book Two	The Wicked + The Divine #12–22	12 July 2017	ISBN 978-1-5343-0220-4
The Wicked + The Divine Book Three	The Wicked + The Divine #23–33	11 December 2018	ISBN 978-1-5343-0857-2
The Wicked + The Divine Book Four	The Wicked + The Divine #34–45, 455 A.D., 1373 A.D., 1831 A.D., 1923 A.D., Christmas Annual and The Funnies	11 March 2020	ISBN 978-1-5343-1358-3

Title	Material collected	Release date	ISBN
The Wicked + The Divine Compendium	The Wicked + The Divine #1–45, The Wicked + The Divine historical specials	10 June 2025	ISBN 978-1-53433-560-8
