= DC All In =

2024 American comic book initiative

- Cover of DC All In Special (October 2024). Art by Daniel Sampere.

Publication information
- Publisher: DC Comics
- Genre: Superhero
- Publication date: October 2024 – present

DC All In is an American comic book initiative spearheaded by writers Scott Snyder and Joshua Williamson and debuted in October 2024 by DC Comics. It is the successor of Dawn of DC, following the end of the "Absolute Power" storyline.

== Publication history ==
The DC All In initiative began with DC All In Special #1, a 64-page one-shot written by Scott Snyder and Joshua Williamson, and illustrated by Wes Craig and Daniel Sampere. It is also a flip book issue, as one half focuses on Superman and the formation of a new Justice League, and the other focuses on Darkseid and the establishment of the Absolute Universe. It was also announced that Snyder would write Absolute Batman and that Williamson would be joined by artist Dan Mora for a new arc of Superman, which debuted a new Superwoman and saw the return of Doomsday.

In 2024, at New York Comic Con, it was announced that Jeph Loeb and Jim Lee would take over the monthly Batman title from Chip Zdarsky and Jorge Jiménez for a six-part story called Hush 2, starting in March 2025. Lee also confirmed that Scott Williams, Alex Sinclair, and Richard Starkings would return as inker, colorist, and letterer respectively for the story and that it would be part of the All-In initiative.

In 2025, announced at New York Comic Con, the next publishing initiative, titled DC Next Level, would launch in March 2026 with several new series putting a focus on lesser-known superheroes. It is described as the "second act" to the All In saga; the "first act" ending with the finale of the DC K.O. event.

== Plot ==
Following the end of Absolute Power, the Justice League has reformed in their new headquarters—the Watchtower—as a new, more open and cooperative organization: Justice League Unlimited. Every hero on Earth is invited to join their ranks and create a global network of super-heroism, coordinated by Red Tornado.

The JLU is disrupted during their first meeting by Darkseid, having felt empty and purposeless about his role in the universe, and wanting to defy his predetermined role by finally winning or dying. He merges with the Spectre, and comes to attack the newly formed league, eventually reveling in his demise and breaching a rift in the multiverse to the Elseworld, which he infects with Darkseid-energy, later dubbed Omega Energy. The League reaches out to Orion, who informs them that Darkseid is missing throughout the multiverse and that he is, in fact, a universal constant, and a new Darkseid will be created to replace him. Booster Gold is sent to explore the world beyond the rift where he is lost to Earth-0, and kidnapped by Darkseid and his Legion.

Several of the titles under the initiative would show throughout the year several Darkseid-related signs, largely appearances of Omega Energy and Parademons. All occurrences culminate in Apokoliptan fire-pits appearing all throughout Earth.

The Quantum Quorum—Time Trapper, World Forger, Gorilla Grodd, and Booster Gold—inform the Justice League of Darkseid's coming. His arrival, according to them, is inevitable, and with the amount of Omega Energy he amassed in the Absolute Universe, is unstoppable. Earth is transforming into a new Apokolips and has been imbued with a Heart of Apokolips. Darkseid will take over Earth throughout space and time, leaving only the present for action, as the Quorum informs the League the only option left is to kill Darkseid with the same energy he uses—Omega (in lieu of Alpha, which is more present on Earth-0, like Superman)—and become the King Omega through a transformative tournament within the Heart. (DC K.O.)

In the final round, Superman almost becomes the King Omega and kills Darkseid, but instead chooses to share the power with his fellow participants in the tournament and, together, they defeat him. Superman restores Earth to its original state and disappears, stating he has more to do elsewhere. Every participant in the tournament is infused with a combination of Alpha and Omega energy.

Darkseid has not died, merely disappeared, his legion hiding in the future of Earth-0. Throughout the Infinite Earths of the multiverse, a DC K.O. tournament was held, and only Earth-Prime remained victorious. Darkseid now controls the multiverse, gathering Omega Energy and power. What comes next is a "Crisis of Absolute Proportions."

== List of publications ==
=== Prelude ===
Title	Issue	Writer	Artist	Publication date
DC All-In Special	one-shot	Scott Snyder; Joshua Williamson	Wes Craig; Daniel Sampere	October 2, 2024

=== DC Universe ===
==== Ongoing series ====
Title	Issues	Creative team			Debut date	Conclusion date
Title	Issues	Writer(s)	Artist(s)	Colorist	Debut date	Conclusion date
Batman (vol. 3)	#153–157	Chip Zdarsky	Jorge Jiménez	Tomeu Morey	October 2, 2024	February 5, 2025
Batman (vol. 3)	#158–163	Jeph Loeb	Jim Lee; Scott Williams	Alex Sinclair	October 2, 2024	May 27, 2026
Birds of Prey (vol. 4)	#14–28	Kelly Thompson	Sami Basri	Adriano Lucas	October 2, 2024	December 3, 2025
Poison Ivy	#26–	G. Willow Wilson	Marcio Takara	Arif Prianto	October 2, 2024	TBA
Shazam! (vol. 4)	#16–21	Josie Campbell	Dan McDaid	Trish Mulvihill	October 2, 2024	March 5, 2025
Action Comics	#1070–1081	Mark Waid	Clayton Henry	Matt Herms	October 9, 2024	TBA
Action Comics	#1070–1081	Mariko Tamaki	Skylar Patridge	Marissa Louise	October 9, 2024	TBA
Action Comics	#1082–1084	John Ridley	Inaki Miranda	Eva de la Cruz	October 9, 2024	TBA
Action Comics	#1085–1086	G. Willow Wilson	Gavin Guidry	Patricia Mulvihill	October 9, 2024	TBA
Action Comics	#1087–	Mark Waid	Skylar Patridge	Ivan Plascencia	October 9, 2024	TBA
Batman and Robin (vol. 3)	#14–30	Phillip Kennedy Johnson	Javier Fernandez	Marcelo Maiolo	October 9, 2024	February 11, 2026
Catwoman (vol. 5)	#69–	Torunn Grønbekk	Fabiana Mascolo	Patricio Delpeche	October 16, 2024	TBA
Green Lantern (vol. 7)	#16–	Jeremy Adams	Xermánico	Romulo Fajardo Jr.	October 16, 2024	TBA
Titans (vol. 4) (Note: Renamed to New Titans (vol. 2) from issue #33 onwards.)	#16–32	John Layman	Pete Woods		October 16, 2024	TBA
Titans (vol. 4)	#33–	Tate Brombal	Sami Basri	Adriano Lucas	October 16, 2024	TBA
Wonder Woman (vol. 6)	#14–28	Tom King	Daniel Sampere	Tomeu Morey	October 16, 2024	TBA
Wonder Woman (vol. 6)	#29–30	Stephanie Williams	Jeffrey Spokes		October 16, 2024	TBA
Wonder Woman (vol. 6)	#31–34	Tom King	Daniel Sampere	Tomeu Morey	October 16, 2024	TBA
Wonder Woman (vol. 6)	#35–36	Stephanie Williams	Clayton Henry	Pedro Estouco	October 16, 2024	TBA
Wonder Woman (vol. 6)	#37–40	Tom King	Daniel Sampere	Alejandro Sanchez	October 16, 2024	TBA
Wonder Woman (vol. 6)	#41–44	Louise Simonson	Cian Tormey		October 16, 2024	TBA
Wonder Woman (vol. 6)	#45–50	Stephanie Williams	Elena Casagrande		October 16, 2024	TBA
Detective Comics	#1090–1120	Tom Taylor	Mikel Janín		October 23, 2024	TBA
The Flash (vol. 6)	#14–25	Simon Spurrier	Vasco Georgiev	Matt Herms	October 23, 2024	TBA
The Flash (vol. 6)	#26–30	Mark Waid; Christopher Cantwell	Vasco Georgiev	Matt Herms	October 23, 2024	TBA
The Flash (vol. 6)	#31–	Ryan North	Gavin Guidry	Adriano Lucas	October 23, 2024	TBA
Green Arrow (vol. 7) (Note: Green Arrow (vol. 7) #17 also contained a story from Joshua Williamson, Amancay Nahuelpan, and Romulo Fajardo Jr.)	#17–31	Chris Condon	Montos	Adriano Lucas	October 23, 2024	December 24, 2025
Harley Quinn (vol. 4)	#44–	Elliott Kalan	Mindy Lee	Tríona Farrell	October 23, 2024	TBA
Nightwing (vol. 4)	#119–	Dan Watters	Dexter Soy	Veronica Gandini	October 23, 2024	TBA
Power Girl (vol. 3)	#14–20	Leah Williams	Adriana Melo; David Baldeón	Romulo Fajardo Jr.	October 23, 2024	April 23, 2025
Superman (vol. 6)	#19–	Joshua Williamson	Dan Mora	Alejandro Sánchez	October 23, 2024	TBA
Batgirl (vol. 6)	#1–	Tate Brombal	Takeshi Miyazawa	Mike Spicer	November 6, 2024	TBA
JSA (vol. 2)	#1–24	Jeff Lemire	Diego Olortegui; Rafael de Latorre	Luis Guerrero	November 6, 2024	October 7, 2026
Justice League Unlimited (vol. 2)	#1–	Mark Waid	Dan Mora; Travis Moore	Tamra Bonvillain	November 27, 2024	TBA
The New Gods	#1–12	Ram V	Evan Cagle	Francesco Segala	December 18, 2024	November 19, 2025
Metamorpho: The Element Man	#1–6	Al Ewing	Steve Lieber	Lee Loughridge	December 25, 2024	May 28, 2025
Aquaman (vol. 9) (Note: Renamed to Emperor Aquaman from issue #15 onwards.)	#1–	Jeremy Adams	John Timms	Rex Lokus	January 8, 2025	TBA
Green Lantern Corps (vol. 4)	#1–	Jeremy Adams; Morgan Hampton	Fernando Pasarín	Oclair Albert	February 12, 2025	TBA
Supergirl (vol. 8)	#1–	Sophie Campbell		Tamra Bonvillain	May 14, 2025	TBA
Superman Unlimited	#1–	Dan Slott	Rafael Albuquerque	Marcelo Maiolo	May 21, 2025	TBA
Batman (vol. 4)	#1–	Matt Fraction	Jorge Jiménez	Tomeu Morey	September 3, 2025	TBA
Red Hood	#1 (Note: Originally intended to be a 12-issue series, it was cancelled after issue #1, following comments made by Felker-Martin on Bluesky regarding the assassination of Charlie Kirk that were deemed "inconsistent with DC's standards of conduct".)	Gretchen Felker-Martin	Jeff Spokes		September 10, 2025	
Gangs of Gotham	#1–	Christopher Cantrell	Mike Henderson	Trish Mulvihill	November 4, 2026	TBA

All new titles starting in 2026 were continued in the DC Next Level initiative.

==== Limited series ====
Title	Issues	Creative team			Debut date	Conclusion date
Title	Issues	Writer	Artist	Colorist	Debut date	Conclusion date
Black Lightning (vol. 3)	#1–5	Brandon Thomas	Fico Ossio	Ulises Arreola	November 13, 2024	March 12, 2025
The Question: All Along the Watchtower	#1–6	Alex Segura	Cian Torney	Romulo Fajardo Jr.	November 20, 2024	April 30, 2025
Batman/Santa Claus: Silent Knight Returns	#1–5	Jeff Parker	Lukas Ketner; Michele Bandini	Marcelo Maiolo	November 27, 2024	December 26, 2024
Two-Face	#1–6	Christian Ward	Fábio Veras	Ivan Plascencia	December 4, 2024	May 7, 2025
Challengers of the Unknown (vol. 5)	#1–5	Christopher Cantwell	Sean Izaakse	Romulo Fajardo Jr.	December 18, 2024	April 16, 2025
Justice League: The Atom Project	#1–6	John Ridley; Ryan Parrott	Mike Perkins	Adriano Lucas	January 1, 2025	June 4, 2025
Zatanna (vol. 3)	#1–6	Jamal Campbell			February 19, 2025	July 16, 2025
Secret Six (vol. 5)	#1–6	Nicole Maines	Stephen Segovia	Rain Beredo	March 3, 2025	August 6, 2025
Fire & Ice: When Hell Freezes Over	#1–6	Joanne Starer	Stephen Byrne		April 9, 2025	September 10, 2025
Mr. Terrific: Year One	#1–6	Al Letson	Valentine De Landro	Marissa Louise	May 28, 2025	October 22, 2025
Trinity: Daughter of Wonder Woman	#1–6	Tom King	Belén Ortega	Alejandro Sánchez	June 11, 2025	November 26, 2025
Krypto: The Last Dog of Krypton	#1–5	Ryan North	Mike Norton	Ian Herring	June 18, 2025	October 15, 2025
Gotham City Sirens: Unfit for Orbit	#1–5	Leah Williams	Haining	Ivan Plascencia	July 2, 2025	July 30, 2025
Cheetah and Cheshire Rob the Justice League	#1–6	Greg Rucka	Nicola Scott	Annette Kwok	August 6, 2025	January 7, 2026
Justice League Red	#1–6	Saladin Ahmed	Clayton Henry	Arif Prianto	August 20, 2025	January 21, 2026
Adventures of Superman: Book of El	#1–12	Phillip Kennedy Johnson	Scott Godlewski		September 3, 2025	September 30, 2026
DC K.O.	#1–5	Scott Snyder; Joshua Williamson	Javi Fernández; Xermánico	Alejandro Sánchez	October 8, 2025	March 4, 2026
DC K.O.: Knightfight	#1–5	Joshua Williamson	Dan Mora	Tríona Farrell	November 5, 2025	February 4, 2026
Justice League: Dream Girls – A DC Pride Event	#1–4	Nicole Maines; Jadzia Axelrod	Nicola Scott; J. Bone; Ted Brandt; Ro Stein; Mikel Janín; Stephen Sadowski; Vincent Cecil; Rosi Kämpe	Marissa Louise; Mike Spicer; Annette Kwok; Dearbhla Kelly; Adriano Lucas; Tríona Farrell; Hi-Fi Designs	June 3, 2026	June 24, 2026
Clayface: Celebrity Dirt	#1–6	Jude Ellison S. Doyle	Fran Galán	Patricio Delpeche	July 8, 2026	TBA

==== One-shots ====
Title	Creative team			Release date
Title	Writer(s)	Artist	Colorist	Release date
Green Lantern Civil Corps Special	Jeremy Adams; Phillip Kennedy Johnson	Salvador Larroca	Luis Guerrero	October 9, 2024
Poison Ivy/Swamp Thing: Feral Trees	G. Willow Wilson	Mike Perkins	Mike Spicer	October 31, 2024
Superwoman Special	Joshua Williamson	Edwin Galmon; Nikola Čižmešija	Rex Lokus	December 11, 2024
Green Lantern: Fractured Spectrum	Jeremy Adams	V. Ken Marion	Romulo Fajardo Jr.	January 8, 2025
DC Power: Rise of the Power Company	Brandon Thomas; Vita Ayala; John Jennings; Zipporah Smith	Charles Stewart III; Ray-Anthony Height; Canaan White; Kelsey Ramsay	Anthony Fowler Jr. Ulises Arreola; Chris Sotomayor; Atagun Ilhan; Andrew Dalhouse; Francesco Segala	January 29, 2025
Superman: Lex Luthor Special	Joshua Williamson	Eddy Barrows	Eber Ferreira	January 29, 2025
Summer of Superman Special	Dan Slott; Mark Waid; Joshua Williamson	Jorge Jiménez	Tomeu Morey	April 16, 2025
The Power Company: Recharged	Bryan Edward Hill	Khary Randolph; Alitha Martinez	Emilio Lopez; Alex Guimarães	April 30, 2025
Free Comic Book Day 2025: DC All In / Absolute Universe Special Edition	Dan Slott; Jeff Lemire	Rafael Albuquerque; Giuseppe Camuncoli; Stefano Nesi	Marcelo Maiolo; Romulo Fajardo Jr.	May 3, 2025
The Flash: Bad Moon Rising Special	Alex Paknadel	Daniel Bayliss	Matt Herms	July 23, 2025
Justice League: Dark Tomorrow Special	Marc Guggenheim; Mark Waid	Cian Tormey	Romulo Fajardo Jr.	July 30, 2025
Justice League: The Omega Act	Joshua Williamson	Yasmin Putri; Cian Tormey	Yasmin Putri	October 1, 2025
Superman: Chains of Love Special	Leah Williams; Dan Slott	Ig Guara; Rosi Kämpe	Fabi Marques; Trish Mulvihill	February 4, 2026
Justice League Intergalactic Special	Jadzia Axelrod; Nicole Maines	Travis Moore	Tamra Bonvillain	April 29, 2026
Tales of the Green Lantern Corps: Guy Gardner	Gerry Duggan	Matteo Lolli; Laura Braga	John Kalisz	May 6, 2026
Summer of Supergirl Special	Sophie Campbell; Gail Simone; Mark Waid	Belén Ortega; Emma Kubert; Cian Tormey	Triona Farrell; Patricia Mulvihill; Alex Guimarães	June 24, 2026
Justice League: Knight Vision Special	Mark Waid; Joshua Williamson	Miguel Mendonça	Romulo Fajardo Jr.	July 29, 2026
Batman: Bad Seeds — Sunset	Matt Fraction; G. Willow Wilson	Giuseppe Camuncoli; Cliff Rathburn	Tomeu Morey	August 26, 2026
Wonder Woman Annual: Wonder War – The Matriarch	Stephanie Williams; Leah Williams	Eduardo Pansica; Belén Ortega	Romulo Fajardo, Jr. Triona Farrell	September 30, 2026
DC All In Saga: Darkseid VS. The World	Scott Snyder; Joshua Williamson	Sanford Greene; Yasmine Putri	Matt Herms; Yasmine Putri	October 28, 2026
Justice League: Dark Realm Special	Dan Mora			October 28, 2026
DC All In Saga: The New Gods	Ram V Alex Paknadel	Joan Urgell	TBA	January 13, 2027
Justice League: Arctic Attack Special	Stephanie Williams	Dexter Soy	TBA	January 27, 2027
DC Power: Black Lightning 50th Anniversary Special	Jenny Blake Isabella; Brandon Thomas; Danny Lore; Gregory Anderson Eyesee; Al Letson	Fico Ossio; Karen S. Darboe; Darryl Banks; Sedat Özgen	TBA	January 27, 2027

=== Absolute Universe ===
Title	Issues	Creative team			Debut date
Title	Issues	Writer(s)	Artist(s)	Colorist(s)	Debut date
Ongoing
Absolute Batman	#1–	Scott Snyder	Nick Dragotta	Frank Martin	October 9, 2024
Absolute Wonder Woman	#1–	Kelly Thompson	Hayden Sherman	Jordie Bellaire	October 23, 2024
Absolute Superman	#1–	Jason Aaron	Rafa Sandoval	Ulises Arreola	November 6, 2024
Absolute Flash	#1–	Jeff Lemire	Nick Robles	Adriano Lucas	March 19, 2025
Absolute Green Lantern	#1–	Al Ewing	Jahnoy Lindsay		April 2, 2025
Limited series
Absolute Martian Manhunter	#1–12	Deniz Camp	Javier Rodríguez		March 26, 2025
Absolute Green Arrow	#1–12	Pornsak Pichetshote	Rafael Albuquerque	Marcelo Maiolo	May 20, 2026
Absolute Catwoman	#1–12	Scott Snyder; Che Grayson	Bengal		June 10, 2026
Absolute Justice	#1–5	Jason Aaron	Juan Ferreyra	TBA	April 2027
One-shots
Free Comic Book Day 2025: DC All In/Absolute Universe Special Edition		Dan Slott; Jeff Lemire	Rafael Albuquerque; Giuseppe Camuncoli; Stefano Nesi	Marcelo Maiolo	May 3, 2025
Absolute Evil		Al Ewing	Giuseppe Camuncoli; Stefano Nesi	Romulo Fajardo Jr.	October 1, 2025
Absolute Batman: Ark M Special		Scott Snyder; Frank Tieri	Josh Hixson	Roman Stevens	January 7, 2026
Absolute Cassandra Cain: The Shadow's Hand		Che Grayson	Matias Bergara	Mike Spicer	September 9, 2026
Absolute Batman: Beyond Ark M		Frank Tieri; Scott Snyder	Francesco Francavilla	TBA	December 2, 2026
Absolute Black Canary		Pornsak Pichetshote	Rafael Albuquerque	TBA	January 20, 2027

== Events and crossovers ==
Part	Issue	Release date
We Are Yesterday
1	Batman/Superman: World’s Finest #38	April 16, 2025
2	Justice League Unlimited (vol. 2) #6	April 23, 2025
3	Batman/Superman: World's Finest 2025 Annual #1	April 30, 2025
4	Batman/Superman: World's Finest #39	May 21, 2025
5	Justice League Unlimited (vol. 2) #7	May 28, 2025
6	Justice League Unlimited (vol. 2) #8	June 25, 2025
The Starbreaker Supremacy
1	Green Lantern (vol. 7) #25	July 23, 2025
2	Green Lantern Corps (vol. 4) #7	August 13, 2025
3	Green Lantern (vol. 7) #26	August 27, 2025
4	Green Lantern Corps (vol. 4) #8	September 10, 2025
5	Green Lantern (vol. 7) #27	September 24, 2025
6	Green Lantern Corps (vol. 4) #9	October 8, 2025
DC K.O.
–	Justice League: The Omega Act #1	October 1, 2025
1	DC K.O. #1	October 8, 2025
2	Titans (vol. 4) #28	October 15, 2025
3	Justice League Unlimited (vol. 2) #12	October 22, 2025
4	Superman (vol. 6) #31	October 22, 2025
5	The Flash (vol. 6) #26	October 22, 2025
6	DC K.O.: Knightfight #1	November 5, 2025
7	Aquaman (vol. 9) #11	November 12, 2025
8	Justice League Red #4	November 19, 2025
9	Titans (vol. 4) #29	November 19, 2025
10	DC K.O. #2	November 26, 2025
11	Justice League Unlimited (vol. 2) #13	November 26, 2025
12	Superman (vol. 6) #32	November 26, 2025
13	The Flash (vol. 6) #27	November 26, 2025
14	DC K.O.: Knightfight #2	December 3, 2025
15	DC K.O.: Superman vs. Captain Atom #1	December 3, 2025
16	Aquaman (vol. 9) #12	December 10, 2025
17	DC K.O.: Wonder Woman vs. Lobo #1	December 10, 2025
18	DC K.O.: Harley Quinn vs. Zatanna #1	December 17, 2025
19	Titans (vol. 4) #30	December 17, 2025
20	DC K.O.: The Joker vs. Red Hood #1	December 24, 2025
21	Justice League Unlimited (vol. 2) #14	December 24, 2025
22	Superman (vol. 6) #33	December 24, 2025
23	The Flash (vol. 6) #28	December 24, 2025
24	DC K.O.: Knightfight #3	January 7, 2026
25	DC K.O. #3	January 14, 2026
26	Aquaman (vol. 9) #13	January 14, 2026
27	DC K.O.: Green Lantern Galactic Slam #1	January 21, 2026
28	Titans (vol. 4) #31	January 21, 2026
29	DC K.O.: The Kids Are All Fight Special #1	January 28, 2026
30	Justice League Unlimited (vol. 2) #15	January 28, 2026
31	Superman (vol. 6) #34	January 28, 2026
32	The Flash (vol. 6) #29	January 28, 2026
33	DC K.O.: Boss Battle	February 4, 2026
34	DC K.O.: Knightfight #4	February 4, 2026
35	DC K.O. #4	February 11, 2026
36	Aquaman (vol. 9) #14	February 11, 2026
37	Titans (vol. 4) #32	February 18, 2026
38	Justice League Unlimited (vol. 2) #16	February 25, 2026
39	Superman (vol. 6) #35	February 25, 2026
40	The Flash (vol. 6) #30	February 25, 2026
41	DC K.O. #5	March 4, 2026
Reign of the Superboys
1	Action Comics #1096	March 11, 2026
2	Supergirl (vol. 8) #11	March 11, 2026
3	Superman Unlimited #11	March 18, 2026
4	Superman (vol. 6) #36	March 25, 2026
5	Action Comics #1097	April 8, 2026
6	Supergirl (vol. 8) #12	April 8, 2026
7	Superman Unlimited #12	April 15, 2026
8	Superman (vol. 6) #37	April 22, 2026
9	Action Comics #1098	May 13, 2026
10	Supergirl (vol. 8) #13	May 13, 2026
11	Superman Unlimited #13	May 20, 2026
12	Superman (vol. 6) #38	May 27, 2026
13	Action Comics #1099	June 10, 2026
14	Supergirl (vol. 8) #14	June 10, 2026
15	Superman Unlimited #14	June 17, 2026
16	Superman (vol. 6) #39	June 24, 2026
17	Supergirl (vol. 8) #15	July 8, 2026
18	Superman Unlimited #15	July 15, 2026
19	Superman (vol. 6) #40	July 22, 2026
20	Action Comics #1100	July 22, 2026
Kingdom of Zod
1	Supergirl (vol. 8) #16	August 12, 2026
2	Action Comics #1101	August 12, 2026
3	Superman Unlimited #16	August 19, 2026
4	Superman (vol. 6) #41	August 26, 2026
5	Supergirl (vol. 8) #17	September 9, 2026
6	Action Comics #1102	September 9, 2026
7	Superman Unlimited #17	September 16, 2026
8	Superman (vol. 6) #42	September 23, 2026
9	Superman: Kingdom of Zod Special #1	September 30, 2026
Batman: Bad Seeds
1	Poison Ivy #47	August 26, 2026
2	Batman: Bad Seeds — Sunset #1	August 26, 2026
3	Batman #13	September 2, 2026
4	Batgirl #23	September 2, 2026
5	Batman: Bad Seeds — Gotham Central #1	September 9, 2026
6	Detective Comics #1113	September 16, 2026
7	Nightwing #142	September 16, 2026
8	Catwoman #91	September 16, 2026
9	Batwoman #7	September 16, 2026
10	Harley Quinn #66	September 23, 2026
11	Poison Ivy #48	September 30, 2026
12	Batman #14	October 7, 2026
13	Batgirl #24	October 7, 2026
14	Batman: Bad Seeds — Streets of Gotham #1	October 14, 2026
15	Batman: Bad Seeds — Gotham Central #2	October 14, 2026
16	Detective Comics #1114	October 21, 2026
17	Batwoman #8	October 21, 2026
18	Catwoman #92	October 21, 2026
19	Nightwing #143	October 21, 2026
20	Harley Quinn #67	October 28, 2026
21	Poison Ivy #49	October 28, 2026
22	Batman: Bad Seeds — Gotham General #1	October 28, 2026
23	Batman: Bad Seeds — Sunrise #1	October 28, 2026
24	Batman: Bad Seeds — Gotham General #2	November 25, 2026
First Light
1	Green Lantern (vol. 7) #40	October 28, 2026
2	Green Lantern Corps (vol. 4) #22	November 11, 2026
3	Green Lantern (vol. 7) #41	November 25, 2026
4	Green Lantern Corps (vol. 4) #23	December 9, 2026
5	Green Lantern (vol. 7) #42	December 23, 2026

== Reception ==
The DC All In Special one-shot received positive reviews, praising how its two main storylines (DC Universe and Absolute Universe) interact with each other.
