= Dan Panosian =

American comic book artist

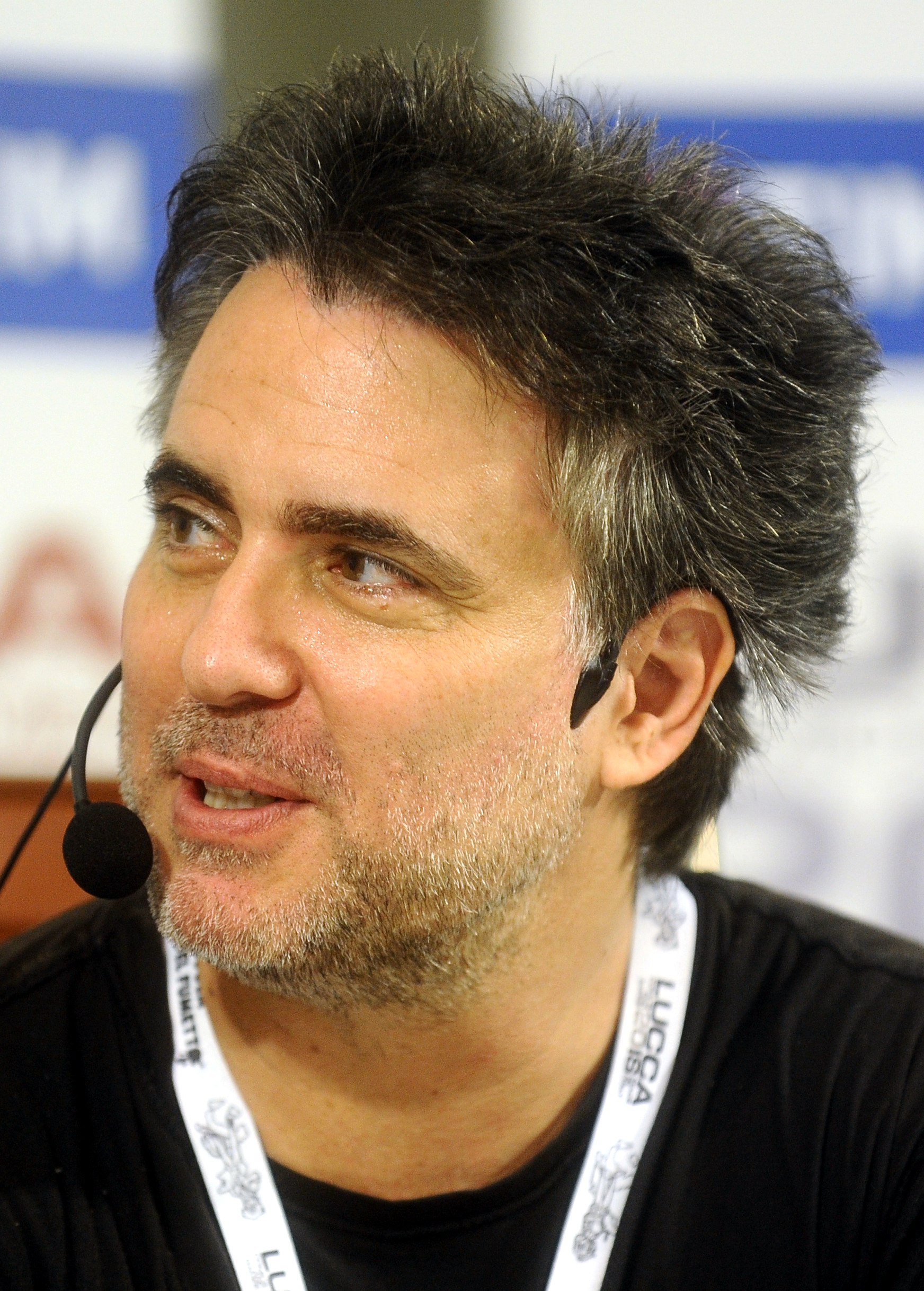
- Dan Panosian at Lucca Comics & Games 2018
- Born: 1969 (age 56–57) Cleveland, Ohio, U.S.
- Areas: Writer, Penciller, Inker

Dan Panosian (born 1969) is an American comic book artist of Armenian descent, with extensive credits as both a penciller and an inker and has additional credits as an advertising and storyboard artist.

== Early life ==
Dan Panosian was born in Cleveland, Ohio, to artistic parents. He is of Armenian descent.

== Career ==
=== Comics ===
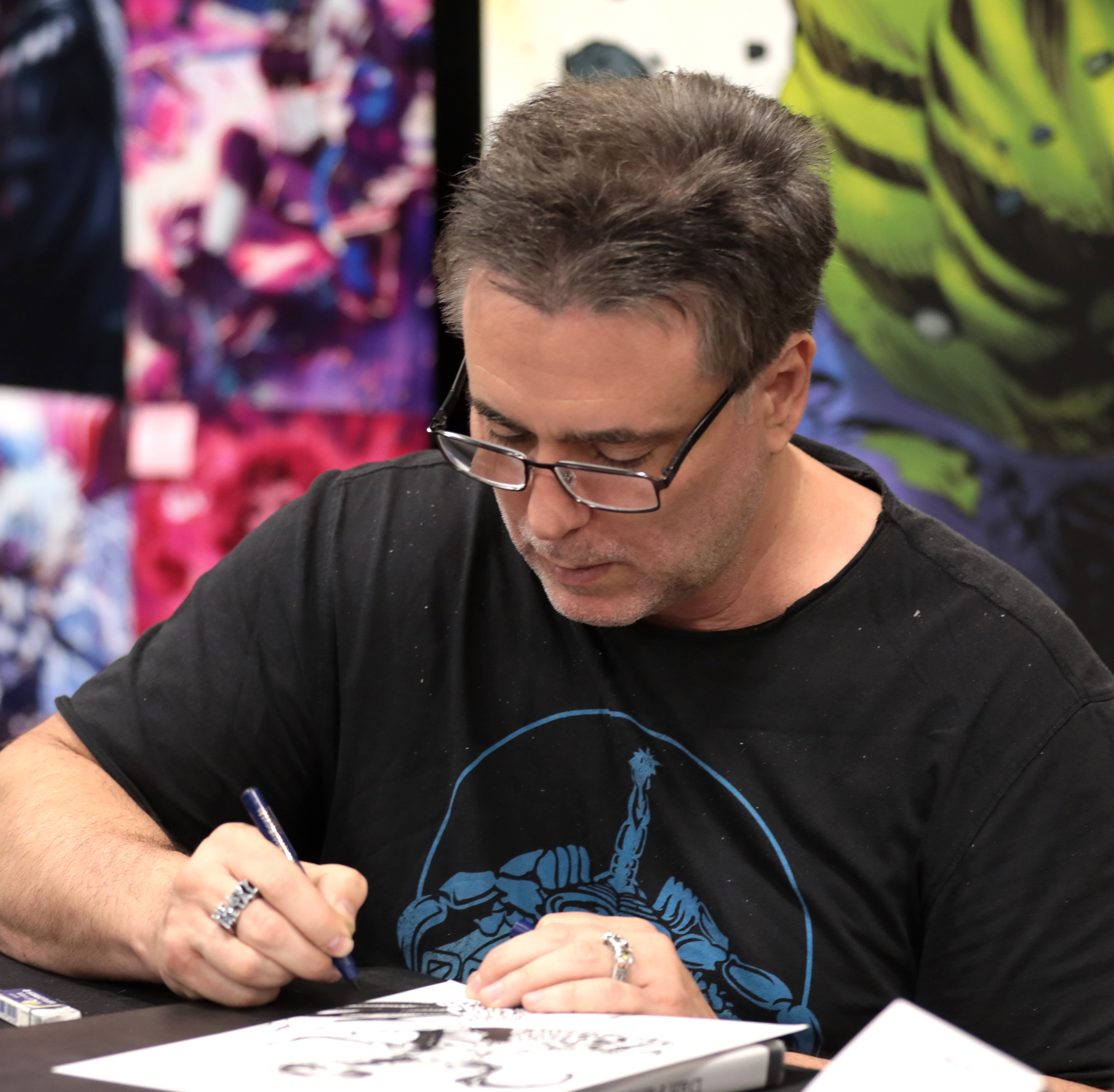
Panosian at the 2023 Phoenix Fan Fusion

At age 14, Panosian sent an art submission to Marvel Comics, which was responded to with encouragement by the Submissions Editor, Len Kaminski. Years later he showcased his work at the New York Comic Convention, where comic book artists Neal Adams and Walt Simonson took notice. Adams offered him a position at his ad agency Continuity Graphics and Simonson called his editor, Ralph Macchio, at Marvel Comics. Panosian was soon working for both companies. Upon entering the Marvel offices for the first time, he was greeted by Kaminski, who had remembered corresponding with Panosian seven years earlier. On his office wall was a "thank you" illustration sent from the 14-year-old Dan Panosian.

After working on back-up features for Captain America, Batman, Spider-Man and Thor, Panosian's work caught the eye of the artistic teams working on the X-Men line of comic books where he became a regular inker.

When Marvel's top artistic talents left to form Image Comics, he was asked to join them and began illustrating comics that often sold around a million copies each month.

Panosian has also done work for Dark Horse Comics, Boom! Studios, Dynamite Entertainment, and DC in the title Batman: Arkham Knight. He also illustrates a series of graphic novels for Le Lombard called John Tiffany.

More recently, Panosian has worked on alternate feature covers for DC, such as the ongoing series Absolute Superman, Absolute Batman, and Absolute Wonder Woman. For Marvel, he's worked on variant covers for the 2025 edition of The Amazing Spider-Man, amongst others.

Being a descendant of survivors from the Armenian genocide, Panosian also contributed to a graphic novel about the genocide called Operation Nemesis: A Story of Genocide & Revenge.

=== Advertising, film and game design ===
Panosian founded Dan Panosian, Inc., through which he began doing advertising work.

He was soon also working with movie and commercial studios providing design and storyboard artwork. Panosian also branched out into book and magazine illustration, apparel lines, and toy design work.

He was the lead designer on a DreamWorks video game about animals that embody the spirit of Kung-Fu. Shortly after, Dan was doing the lead design work for the video game series Duke Nukem.

Panosian illustrated one of Byron Preiss's first CD-ROM comic books, The Suit.

He made the fake comic book covers seen in the 2017 film Logan, as Marvel Comics did not allow actual comic book issues to be used.

== Personal life ==
Panosian, his wife and their son live in Los Angeles.

== Awards ==
Panosian received an Best-of-Show Addy Award for his work on the DSL ad campaign: Jack Flash. In 2011, Panosian was the Keynote Speaker for the 2011 Inkwell Awards Awards Ceremony at HeroesCon. In July 2025, he was named a Special Ambassador for the Inkwell Awards.

== Selected bibliography ==
=== Marvel Comics ===
- Alpha Flight
- Astonishing X-Men
- Captain America
- The Incredible Hulk
- Iron Man
- Magneto
- Marvel Tales
- Savage Sword of Conan
- Thor
- The Uncanny X-Men
- Web of Spider-Man
- Wolverine
- Wonder Man

=== Image Comics ===
- Arkham Knight
- Cyberforce
- Phantom Force
- Pitt
- Prophet
- Savage Dragon
- Slots
- Spawn
- Stormwatch
- Wetworks
- Witchblade
- Youngblood Battlezone

=== Other ===
- Operation Nemesis: A Story of Genocide & Revenge
