= Superman Unlimited =

Comic book series

- Cover of Superman Unlimited #1 (July 2025), art by Rafael Albuquerque.

Publication information
- Publisher: DC Comics
- Schedule: Monthly
- Format: Ongoing series
- Genre: Superhero
- Publication date: May 2025
- No. of issues: 16
- Main character(s): Superman; Jon Kent; Lois Lane

Creative team
- Written by: Dan Slott
- Penciller(s): Rafael Albuquerque; Lucas Meyer; Mike Norton
- Inker: Lucas Meyer

Superman Unlimited is an American superhero comic-book series published by DC Comics. Written by Dan Slott, with initial artwork by Rafael Albuquerque, the series debuted in May 2025 as part of DC's "Summer of Superman" publishing initiative, an event celebrating Superman's pop-culture legacy and coinciding with the theatrical release of Superman. It is an ongoing series set in the main DC Universe and focuses on Superman and his supporting cast in a world radically altered by the widespread availability of Kryptonite.

== Publication history ==
DC Comics announced Superman Unlimited on January 15, 2025, naming Dan Slott as writer and Rafael Albuquerque as the initial artist. The announcement described the series as one of the central titles of DC's forthcoming "Summer of Superman" initiative and as Slott's debut as the writer of a DC ongoing series. The first issue was scheduled for May 21, 2025. A 10-page prelude, referred to by DC as a "Zero Issue", appeared in DC All In/Absolute Universe 2025 FCBD Special Edition #1, distributed for Free Comic Book Day on May 3, 2025. The story was written by Slott, drawn by Albuquerque, and colored by Marcelo Maiolo.

The regular series began with Superman Unlimited #1 on May 21, 2025. The issue was written by Slott, drawn by Albuquerque, and colored by Maiolo. Its cover price was $4.99 and it contained 32 pages. Albuquerque remained the principal artist through the first six issues, although Mike Norton also contributed artwork to issue #6. Lucas Meyer subsequently became a regular artist on the series, with Norton handling issues #9 and #10 and other artists contributing to individual issues. Slott has remained the series' writer.

Following the conclusion of the Kingdom of Zod storyline, Superman, Lois Lane, and their son Jon Kent under his alias of Tomorrow Man, began headlining the comic from issue #18 onwards in October 2026.

== Premise ==
The series begins when a massive asteroid approaches Earth. Superman is dispatched by the Justice League to stop it, only to discover that the asteroid is composed largely of Kryptonite. The asteroid is destroyed, but fragments and deposits of Kryptonite become distributed worldwide and commonly available. DC's announcement described criminals and other threats using Kryptonite-based weapons, creating a world in which Superman can no longer rely on his conventional physical superiority.

The event also produces major geopolitical and technological consequences. Large deposits of Kryptonite are mined, while the fictional nation of El Caldero becomes particularly important because of its enormous Kryptonite reserves. The series develops El Caldero into what DC describes as the "Kryptonite Kingdom". Another major element of the new status quo is the expansion of the Daily Planet. Lois Lane remains editor-in-chief while the newspaper develops into a larger multimedia and international organization.

== Reception ==
Superman Unlimited has received generally positive critical and reader reception. As of August 2026, Comic Book RoundUp lists the series with an 8.3/10 critic rating based on 132 reviews and an 8.3/10 user rating based on 150 reviews. The first issue received an 8.5/10 critic rating and a 7.8/10 user rating. Reviews have particularly praised the book's optimistic characterization of Superman, humor, supporting cast and classic superhero atmosphere. Some reviewers have compared Slott's approach favorably to the more grounded or character-driven "triangle era" of Superman comics.

However, common criticisms include uneven pacing, occasional filler-like issues, an abundance of plot ideas and inconsistent use of supporting characters. For example, reviews of issue #8 criticized its limited connection to the larger storyline, while other reviews felt that Lois Lane was unnecessarily sidelined. The reception to the later Jon Kent material was generally stronger. Issues #11–15 received particularly favorable reviews from several critics, with reviewers highlighting the emotional material surrounding Jon and his evolving identity.

== Collections ==
#	Title	Material collected	Pages	Publication Date	ISBN
Paperback
1	Kryptonite Kingdom	Superman Unlimited #1–6.	176	February 25, 2026	978-1799507574
2	This Looks Like a Job...	Superman Unlimited #7–10, Superman: Chains of Love Special #1	160	August 12, 2026	978-1799514305
