= Absolute Universe =

DC Comics imprint

- Textless cover of Absolute Evil #1, art by Giuseppe Camuncoli

Publication information
- Publisher: DC Comics
- Genre: Superhero
- Publication date: October 2, 2024 – present

The Absolute Universe (AU) is an imprint of American comic books published by DC Comics. The comics take place in a shared universe designated Alpha-World as part of the DC Comics multiverse, featuring reimagined and modernized versions of the company's superhero characters from the DC Universe. The line is overseen by writer Scott Snyder.

The imprint is part of the DC All In initiative, debuting in the aftermath of the 2024 "Absolute Power" storyline. It was launched that year with the publication of the ongoing series Absolute Batman, Absolute Wonder Woman and Absolute Superman.

== Publication history ==
The Absolute Universe (AU) is an all-new continuity separate from the DC Universe (DCU) overseen by Scott Snyder as part of the DC All In initiative. The existence of the new universe was first rumored in 2023 in relation to Snyder, before leaks emerged that it would be called the Absolute Universe as part of a wider program called DC All In. Several additional leaks occurred in the run-up to San Diego Comic-Con in July 2024 when it was officially announced by DC Comics.

The AU began in October 2024 with the DC All-In Special. The first titles released in the AU were Absolute Batman by Snyder with Nick Dragotta, and Absolute Wonder Woman by Kelly Thompson and Hayden Sherman, which both started publication in October. A third title, Absolute Superman by Jason Aaron and Rafa Sandoval, debuted in November of the same year. Originally, Rafael Albuquerque was set to illustrate Absolute Superman, but had to pull out of the project due to severe floods in his home country of Brazil, with Sandoval being brought onto the project in June 2024.

Three further titles were released in 2025: Absolute Flash by Jeff Lemire and Nick Robles, Absolute Martian Manhunter by Deniz Camp and Javier Rodríguez (both in March), and Absolute Green Lantern by Al Ewing and Jahnoy Lindsay in April. Two additional titles, Absolute Green Arrow by Pornsak Pichetshote and Rafael Albuquerque, and Absolute Catwoman by Che Grayson, Scott Snyder, and Bengal were released in 2026. Additionally, Absolute Catwoman featured a one-shot spinoff focused on the Absolute version of Cassandra Cain, titled Absolute Cassandra Cain: The Shadow's Hand, written by Che Grayson, while Absolute Green Arrow will feature a one-shot spinoff starring the Absolute version of Black Canary, set to release in January 2027.

Outside of the Absolute Universe's continuity, the Absolute versions of Batman, Superman, and Wonder Woman appeared at the end of DC K.O. #3, a series that features Darkseid wishing to transform DC's Prime Earth following the creation of the Absolute Universe. The Absolute Universe's first crossover event, Absolute Justice, is set to release in 2027, featuring the Absolute versions of Batman, Superman, Wonder Woman, Green Lantern, Flash, and Martian Manhunter.

== Setting ==
The AU features previous concepts from Doomsday Clock (2017–2019), Dark Nights: Death Metal (2020–2021), and Infinite Frontier (2021–2023). It is set in Earth-Alpha, also called the Elseworld, one of the two pillars of the Metaverse, along with Earth-Omega, where Darkseid used to be imprisoned. According to Snyder, while the DCU is "influenced by Superman energy", the AU is "influenced by Darkseid energy", making society treat superheroes as underdogs.

It is established in DC All In Special that Earth-Alpha has been reshaped by Darkseid's essence as he is bent on creating a world driven by challenge and turmoil in which heroes are the "small chaos" rather than established parts of its system, while attempting to control its past and future during the gradual consolidation of the timeline on modern times. Vital, familiar elements of the characters are stripped, such as Batman's wealth, Diana's Amazons, and Superman's upbringing with the Kents, though the key personality traits and salient themes found in their stories remain intact.

Main changes between the Absolute Universe and the mainline DC universe come down to differences in power (the rich and wealthy largely dominate the world's politics and rule without repercussion, with the world's heroes at a severe disadvantage against them) and worldbuilding (there is no presence of the New Gods, certain aliens such as Martians lack physical bodies, and the emotional spectrum of the Lantern Corps is shortened). Important changes include:

- The Justice League is an alliance between the Joker, Ra's al Ghul, Hector Hammond, Veronica Cale, and Elenore Thawne.
- Bruce Wayne is a blue-collar civil engineer, working with MI6 special agent Alfred Pennyworth. His mother, Martha, is still alive, and his close friends include Waylon Jones, Edward Nygma, Harvey Dent, Oswald Cobblepot, Mitchell "Matches" Malone and Selina Kyle.
- Kal-El grew up on Krypton prior to its destruction, and lives as an illegal immigrant on Earth with his AI companion Sol, which functions as his cape and Fortress of Solitude. Lois Lane is a corporate soldier for the Lazarus Corp while Jimmy Olsen is a member of the Omega Men.
- Diana grew up in Hell, raised by her adoptive mother Circe and mentored by the Greek gods, having been separated from the Amazons at birth by Zeus.
- Wally West is an army brat who kills Barry Allen by accident and is a loose fugitive after gaining his superpowers, accompanied by a mutant monkey named Grodd.
- John Jones is a human FBI agent whose mind is invaded by a non-physical alien entity ("The Martian") following a severe head trauma, granting him psychic abilities.
- The emotional spectrum consists of black (Qard: chaotic action), red (Rao: restraint from action), green (Sur: correct action), and yellow (Aur: enlightenment). Users of the light are classified using the prefixes "Abin" (meaning one who uses the light with understanding), "Ain" (initiates chosen by an Abin), or "Tomar" (anomalies who were not properly selected). Sojourner Mullein is a former police officer who becomes an anomalous user of green light (Tomar Sur). Other characters include Abin Sur, Hal Jordan (an Ain Qard), Guy Gardner (an Ain Rao), John Stewart (an Ain Aur), officers Cameron Chase and Simon Baz, Tomar-Re (a Tomar Rao). Kilowog and Mogo are members of the Blackstars (Abin Qards) who are led by the Controller of MU (an Abin Aur).
- Following the death of Oliver Queen, his estranged son Connor Hawke becomes the mysterious archer known as the "Green Arrow Killer", targeting corrupt billionaires connected to Queen, which brings him to conflict with Hector Hammond, who hires Malcolm Merlyn and Dinah Lance to investigate.

== List of publications ==
=== Prelude ===
Title	Writer(s)	Artist(s)	Colorist(s)	Publication date	Ref.
DC All In Special	Scott Snyder; Joshua Williamson	Wes Craig; Daniel Sampere	Mike Spicer; Alejandro Sánchez	October 2, 2024	

=== Ongoing series ===
Title	Issue	Writer(s)	Artist(s)	Colorist(s)	Publication date	Ref.
Absolute Batman	1–	Scott Snyder	Nick Dragotta	Frank Martin	October 9, 2024	
Absolute Wonder Woman	1–	Kelly Thompson	Hayden Sherman	Jordie Bellaire	October 23, 2024	
Absolute Superman	1–	Jason Aaron	Rafa Sandoval	Ulises Arreola	November 6, 2024	
Absolute Flash	1–	Jeff Lemire	Nick Robles	Adriano Lucas	March 19, 2025	
Absolute Green Lantern	1–	Al Ewing	Jahnoy Lindsay		April 2, 2025	

=== Limited series ===
Title	Issue	Writer(s)	Artist(s)	Colorist(s)	Debut date	Conclusion date	Ref.
Absolute Martian Manhunter	1–12	Deniz Camp	Javier Rodríguez		March 26, 2025	July 1, 2026	
Absolute Green Arrow	1–12	Pornsak Pichetshote	Rafael Albuquerque	Marcelo Maiolo	May 20, 2026	TBA	
Absolute Catwoman	1–12	Scott Snyder; Che Grayson	Bengal	Giovanna Niro	June 10, 2026	TBA	
Absolute Justice	1–5	Jason Aaron	Juan Ferreyra	TBA	April 7, 2027	TBA	

=== One-shots ===
Title	Writer(s)	Artist(s)	Colorist(s)	Publication date	Ref.
Free Comic Book Day 2025: DC All In/Absolute Universe Special Edition	Dan Slott; Jeff Lemire	Rafael Albuquerque; Giuseppe Camuncoli; Stefano Nesi	Marcelo Maiolo	May 3, 2025	
Absolute Evil	Al Ewing	Giuseppe Camuncoli; Stefano Nesi	Romulo Fajardo Jr.	October 1, 2025	
Absolute Batman: Ark M Special	Scott Snyder; Frank Tieri	Joshua Hixson	Roman Stevens	January 7, 2026	
Absolute Cassandra Cain: The Shadow's Hand	Che Grayson	Matías Bergara	Mike Spicer	September 16, 2026	
Batman Day 2026: Batman of Two Worlds	Matt Fraction; Scott Snyder	Javier Fernandez; Nick Derington	Tomeu Morey; Frank Martin	September 19, 2026	
Absolute Batman: Beyond Ark M	Scott Snyder; Frank Tieri	Francesco Francavilla	TBA	December 16, 2026	
Absolute Black Canary	Pornsak Pichetshote	Belén Ortega	TBA	January 20, 2027	

== Collected editions ==
=== Hardcovers and trade paperbacks ===
#	Title	Material collected	Format	Pages	Released	ISBN
Absolute Batman
1	The Zoo	Absolute Batman #1–6	HC	192	August 5, 2025	978-1799505242
1	The Zoo	Absolute Batman #1–6	TPB	192	August 5, 2025	978-1799505259
2	Abomination	Absolute Batman #7–14	HC	224	February 3, 2026	978-1799507505
2	Abomination	Absolute Batman #7–14	TPB	224	February 3, 2026	978-1799507512
3	Devil's Workshop	Absolute Batman 2025 Annual #1, Absolute Batman: Ark M Special #1 and Absolute Batman #15−18	HC	208	September 8, 2026	978-1799508908
3	Devil's Workshop	Absolute Batman 2025 Annual #1, Absolute Batman: Ark M Special #1 and Absolute Batman #15−18	TPB	208	September 8, 2026	978-1799508915
4	The Straw Man	Absolute Batman #19−25	HC	208	March 2, 2027	978-1799516200
4	The Straw Man	Absolute Batman #19−25	TPB	208	March 2, 2027	978-1799516194
Absolute Wonder Woman
1	The Last Amazon	Absolute Wonder Woman #1–7	HC	208	August 12, 2025	978-1799505297
1	The Last Amazon	Absolute Wonder Woman #1–7	TPB	208	August 12, 2025	978-1799505303
2	As My Mothers Made Me	Absolute Wonder Woman #8–14	HC	208	February 17, 2026	978-1799507536
2	As My Mothers Made Me	Absolute Wonder Woman #8–14	TPB	208	February 17, 2026	978-1799507543
3	Season of the Witch	Absolute Wonder Woman #15–20 and Absolute Wonder Woman 2026 Annual #1	HC	216	October 27, 2026	978-1799508946
3	Season of the Witch	Absolute Wonder Woman #15–20 and Absolute Wonder Woman 2026 Annual #1	TPB	216	October 27, 2026	978-1799508953
4	Heretic	Absolute Wonder Woman #21–26	HC	200	April 13, 2027	978-1799516163
4	Heretic	Absolute Wonder Woman #21–26	TPB	200	April 13, 2027	978-1799516156
Absolute Superman
1	Last Dust Of Krypton	Absolute Superman #1–6	HC	176	August 19, 2025	978-1799505327
1	Last Dust Of Krypton	Absolute Superman #1–6	TPB	176	August 19, 2025	978-1799505334
2	Son of the Demon	Absolute Superman #7–14	HC	208	March 2, 2026	978-1799507758
2	Son of the Demon	Absolute Superman #7–14	TPB	208	March 2, 2026	978-1799507529
3	The Neverending Begins	Absolute Superman #15–21	HC	184	November 3, 2026	978-1799508922
3	The Neverending Begins	Absolute Superman #15–21	TPB	184	November 3, 2026	978-1799508939
4	Get Brainiac	Absolute Superman #22–27	HC	152	May 4, 2027	978-1799516118
4	Get Brainiac	Absolute Superman #22–27	TPB	152	May 4, 2027	978-1799516101
Absolute Martian Manhunter
1	Martian Vision	Absolute Martian Manhunter #1–6	HC	160	November 18, 2025	978-1799505204
1	Martian Vision	Absolute Martian Manhunter #1–6	TPB	160	November 18, 2025	978-1799505211
2	The Agency	Absolute Martian Manhunter #7–12	HC	160	August 25, 2026	978-1799510871
2	The Agency	Absolute Martian Manhunter #7–12	TPB	160	August 25, 2026	978-1799510888
Absolute Green Lantern
1	Without Fear	Absolute Green Lantern #1–6	HC	176	December 9, 2025	978-1799505549
1	Without Fear	Absolute Green Lantern #1–6	TPB	176	December 9, 2025	978-1799505556
2	Sojourner	Absolute Green Lantern #7–12	HC	176	June 9, 2026	978-1799508403
2	Sojourner	Absolute Green Lantern #7–12	TPB	176	June 9, 2026	978-1799508410
3	Anomalies	Absolute Green Lantern #13–17	HC	152	December 1, 2026	978-1799509950
3	Anomalies	Absolute Green Lantern #13–17	TPB	152	December 1, 2026	978-1799509967
4	TBA	Absolute Green Lantern #18–24	HC	176	June 1, 2027	978-1799515999
4	TBA	Absolute Green Lantern #18–24	TPB	176	June 1, 2027	978-1799515982
Absolute Flash
1	Of Two Worlds	Absolute Flash #1–6	HC	168	December 23, 2025	978-1799505181
1	Of Two Worlds	Absolute Flash #1–6	TPB	168	December 23, 2025	978-1799505198
2	Still Point	Absolute Flash #7–12	HC	160	June 23, 2026	978-1799508380
2	Still Point	Absolute Flash #7–12	TPB	160	June 23, 2026	978-1799508397
3	Mirror Mirror	Absolute Flash #13–17	HC	192	December 8, 2026	978-1799509936
3	Mirror Mirror	Absolute Flash #13–17	TPB	192	December 8, 2026	978-1799509943
4	TBA	Absolute Flash #18–24	HC	216	August 3, 2027	978-1799515975
4	TBA	Absolute Flash #18–24	TPB	216	August 3, 2027	978-1799515968
Absolute Green Arrow
1	The Longbow Killer	Absolute Evil #1 and Absolute Green Arrow #1–6	HC	200	February 23, 2027	978-1799517207
1	The Longbow Killer	Absolute Evil #1 and Absolute Green Arrow #1–6	TPB	200	February 23, 2027	978-1799517214
Absolute Catwoman
1	The Yarn	Absolute Catwoman #1–6 and Absolute Cassandra Cain: The Shadow's Hand #1	HC	200	July 13, 2027	978-1799517184
1	The Yarn	Absolute Catwoman #1–6 and Absolute Cassandra Cain: The Shadow's Hand #1	TPB	200	July 13, 2027	978-1799517191

=== Oversized hardcovers ===
#	Title	Material collected	Format	Pages	Released	ISBN
Absolute Superman
1	Absolute Superman: Deluxe Edition Vol. 1	Absolute Superman #1–14	HC	448	August 12, 2027	978-1799514237
Absolute Batman
1	Absolute Batman: Deluxe Edition Vol. 1	Absolute Batman #1–14	HC	424	August 24, 2027	978-1799514275
Absolute Martian Manhunter
1	Absolute Martian Manhunter: Deluxe Edition	Absolute Martian Manhunter #1–12	HC	384	August 30, 2027	978-1799514244
Absolute Wonder Woman
1	Absolute Wonder Woman: Deluxe Edition Vol. 1	Absolute Wonder Woman #1–14	HC	464	August 31, 2027	978-1799513865

== Reception ==
=== Sales ===
The first issue of Absolute Batman had a print run of around 250,000 copies and by the end of 2024, Absolute Batman became the best selling comic of 2024, with combined sales of first, second, third and black-and-white printings, selling just under 400,000 copies. Initial orders of Absolute Wonder Woman #1 received orders of around 150,000, and Absolute Superman having a print run of about 180,000 copies.

By February 2025, the line had sold over 2.5 million units.

With the second wave of the Absolute Line, Absolute Flash #1 was the best selling Flash comic since Flash #1 from 1987, getting over 180,000 pre-orders, along with Absolute Martian Manhunter #1 having sold over 120,000 copies.

As of December 2025, the Absolute Universe line has sold over 8.5 million units, with Absolute Batman being the top-selling title at nearly 3 million.

In February 2026, DC Comics announced that 50 Absolute Universe issues (Absolute Batman #1–14, Absolute Wonder Woman #1–11, Absolute Superman #1–10, Absolute Flash #1–5, Absolute Green Lantern #1–4, and Absolute Martian Manhunter #1–6) would be reprinted and releasing in March 2026, with all receiving at least their third reprinting. The March 2026 releases saw Absolute Batman #1 receive its 11th reprinting.

=== Accolades ===
Year	Award	Category	Nominee	Comic	Result	Ref.
2025	Eisner Awards	Best New Series	Scott Snyder and Nick Dragotta	Absolute Batman	Nominated	
2025	Eisner Awards	Best New Series	Kelly Thompson and Hayden Sherman	Absolute Wonder Woman	Won	
2025	Eisner Awards	Best Writer	Kelly Thompson	Absolute Wonder Woman	Nominated	
2025	Eisner Awards	Best Penciller/Inker	Nick Dragotta	Absolute Batman	Nominated	
2025	Eisner Awards	Best Cover Artist	Hayden Sherman	Absolute Wonder Woman	Nominated	
2025	Eisner Awards	Best Coloring	Jordie Bellaire	Absolute Wonder Woman	Won	
2025	Eisner Awards	Best Lettering	Becca Carey	Absolute Wonder Woman; Absolute Superman	Nominated	
2025	Eisner Awards	Best Lettering	Clayton Cowles	Absolute Batman	Won	
2026	Eisner Awards	Best One-Shot/Single Issue	Daniel Warren Johnson, James Harren, and Meredith McClaren	Absolute Batman 2025 Annual #1	Won	
2026	Eisner Awards	Best One-Shot/Single Issue	Deniz Camp and Javier Rodriguez	Absolute Martian Manhunter #1	Nominated	
2026	Eisner Awards	Best Continuing Series	Scott Snyder, Nick Dragotta, and others	Absolute Batman	Won	
2026	Eisner Awards	Best Continuing Series	Kelly Thompson, Hayden Sherman, and Mattia De Iulis	Absolute Wonder Woman	Nominated	
2026	Eisner Awards	Best Limited Series	Deniz Camp and Javier Rodriguez	Absolute Martian Manhunter	Won	
2026	Eisner Awards	Best Writer	Deniz Camp	Absolute Martian Manhunter	Nominated	
2026	Eisner Awards	Best Writer	Scott Snyder	Absolute Batman	Nominated	
2026	Eisner Awards	Best Writer	Kelly Thompson	Absolute Wonder Woman	Nominated	
2026	Eisner Awards	Best Penciller/Inker	Javier Rodriguez	Absolute Martian Manhunter	Won	
2026	Eisner Awards	Best Penciller/Inker	Hayden Sherman	Absolute Wonder Woman	Nominated	
2026	Eisner Awards	Best Cover Artist	Nick Dragotta	Absolute Batman Absolute Batman 2025 Annual	Nominated	
2026	Eisner Awards	Best Cover Artist	Francesco Francavilla	Absolute Batman Absolute Martian Manhunter	Nominated	
2026	Eisner Awards	Best Cover Artist	Mateus Manhanini	Absolute Superman Absolute Wonder Woman	Nominated	
2026	Eisner Awards	Best Cover Artist	Javier Rodriguez	Absolute Martian Manhunter	Won	
2026	Eisner Awards	Best Cover Artist	Hayden Sherman	Absolute Wonder Woman	Nominated	
2026	Eisner Awards	Best Coloring	Jordie Bellaire	Absolute Wonder Woman	Won	
2026	Eisner Awards	Best Coloring	Javier Rodriguez	Absolute Martian Manhunter	Nominated	
2026	Eisner Awards	Best Lettering	Clayton Cowles	Absolute Batman	Nominated	
2026	Eisner Awards	Best Lettering	Hassan Otsmane-Elhaou	Absolute Martian Manhunter	Won	

== In other media ==
=== Television ===
In June 2026, during the Annecy International Animation Film Festival, it was announced an animated series adaptation of Absolute Batman was in development at Warner Bros. Animation and DC Studios. Scott Snyder will serve as showrunner and executive producer on the series while Nick Dragotta serves as producer.

=== Film ===
The Absolute Universe version of Brainiac served as an inspiration for the DC Universe (DCU) version of the character in Man of Tomorrow, portrayed by Lars Eidinger.

=== Comic books ===
The one-shot comic Mad About DC, released on April 1, 2026, features two short parody stories of the Absolute Universe. The first story, titled "The Punt", was written by Scott Snyder (the writer of Absolute Batman) and illustrated by James Harren, while the second story, titled "Absolute Cash-In", was written by Tom Taylor and illustrated by Bruno Redondo. The two stories respectively introduce the Absolute Universe versions of the characters Maxie Zeus and Condiment King.

=== Video games ===
The Absolute Universe versions of Batman and Catwoman appear as outfits for the respective characters in the game Lego Batman: Legacy of the Dark Knight.

== See also ==
- Earth One: The first modern reimagining of DC Comics titular characters.
- Ultimate Marvel: An imprint by Marvel Comics similar to Absolute Universe and Earth One.
- Ultimate Universe: Another Marvel Comics imprint with a modern reimagining of its characters released around the same time as the Absolute Universe.
- Midnight Universe: A Marvel Comics imprint that reimagines its characters in horror-themed settings.
- Energon Universe: An Image Comics shared universe of Hasbro action brands like Transformers and G.I. Joe.
