= Exquisite Corpses =

Comic book series

- Cover art for issue #1

Publication information
- Publisher: Image Comics; Tiny Onion
- Schedule: Monthly
- Genre: Action, horror
- Publication date: May 14, 2025 – present
- No. of issues: 13

Creative team
- Created by: James Tynion IV; Michael Walsh
- Written by: James Tynion IV; Michael Walsh
- Artist: Michael Walsh
- Colorist: Jordie Bellaire

Exquisite Corpses is an American action-horror comic book limited series created by James Tynion IV and Michael Walsh, and published by Image Comics and Tiny Onion on May 14, 2025.

== Premise ==
Every five years on Halloween, the wealthiest families in the United States play a game in which twelve of the deadliest people in the world must compete to be the last killer standing. In this series, the game is set in the fictional town of Oak Valley, Maine, where the citizens must survive the killers throughout the night.

== List of characters ==
- The Thirteen Families - representatives of the most powerful families in the world from their respective states, each of whom hires a killer to compete in their game every five years. During the game in Oak Valley, Pennsylvania are the hosts and therefore, don't have a stake or a killer in the game.
- Xavi - a high school student working at a local haunted house
- Laura - an EMT who receives a strange letter from her uncle, the town's sheriff, warning her to leave town before nightfall and not look back
- Jason - a young boy who Craig unwittingly agrees to babysit on Halloween
- Audrey - Jason's mother, who works at a car dealership
- Craig - a high school student and Xavi's boyfriend
- Ian - Laura's fellow EMT
- Mike - a gas station cashier and drug-dealer
- Bruce - Audrey's boss

The Oak Valley Killers
Assassin	State	Weapon
Lone Gunman	Massachusetts	Gun
Leopold Strong	North Carolina	Hammer
Recluse	Rhode Island	Rope
Fox Mask Killer	New York	Sword
Pretty Boy	Georgia	Axe
Lady Carolina	South Carolina	Arrow
The Congregation	New Hampshire	Knife
Rascal Randy	New Jersey	Hands
Layla Blaze	Delaware	Fire
Slater	Maryland	Explosives
Nurse Pete	Virginia	Poison
G4M3R_KlD and Calvin	Connecticut	Electricity

== Publication history ==
The debut issue of Exquisite Corpses was published on May 14, 2025, having first been announced in October 2024 as Project Exquisite. The crew of artists included Adam Gorham, Becca Carey, Che Grayson, Claire Roe, Gavin Fullerton, Jordie Bellaire, Marianna Ignazzi, Pornsak Pichetshote, Tyler Boss, and Valentine De Landro.

== Sequel & Spin-offs ==
In October 2025, Tynion revealed Exquisite Corpses had sold more than 400,000 copies in its first six months. He added that, although the series itself is a 13-issue maxi, there are locked in plans for a wider five-year run. This larger franchise is partially as a response to Skybound/Hasbro's Energon Universe.

In February 2026 at Tiny Onions ComicsPRO event, Tynion announced three spin-off mini-series Exquisite Corpses: Rascal Randy, Fox Mask Killer and Lone Gunman each focussing on killers from the first series with Rascal Randy debuting in July 2026. Also announced was the one-shot anthology Exquisite Corpses: Book of the Dead focussing on the other killers.

Tynion also confirmed that a second series of Exquisite Corpses would debut in 2027 set in a brand new town with brand new killers and civilians, with Michael Walsh returning to design the new killers.

A film adapation based on the comics was announced on January 15, 2026 to be in the works by Lyrical Media and Tiny Onion along side adaptating another comic series Room Service as a film as part of their partnership.

== Reception ==
The comic book received mostly positive reviews from critics.

== Collected Editions ==
Title	Material collected	Pages	Released	ISBN
Exquisite Corpses Vol. 1	Exquisite Corpses #1-3	144	Sep 17, 2025	978-1-5343-3104-4
Exquisite Corpses Vol. 2	Exquisite Corpses #4-8	128	Apr 14, 2026	978-1-5343-3468-7
Exquisite Corpses Vol. 3	Exquisite Corpses #9-13	144	Aug 19, 2026	978-1-5343-3571-4

== See also ==
- The Bone Orchard Mythos
