= Absolute Wonder Woman =

Comic book series by DC Comics

- Textless cover of Absolute Wonder Woman #1, art by Hayden Sherman

Publication information
- Publisher: DC Comics (Absolute Universe)
- Schedule: Monthly
- Format: Ongoing
- Genre: Superhero fiction
- Publication date: October 23, 2024 – present
- No. of issues: 24 + 1 Annual
- Main character(s): Wonder Woman; Circe; Steve Trevor; Barbara Minerva; Etta Candy; Gia Candy; Veronica Cale

Creative team
- Written by: Kelly Thompson
- Artist(s): Hayden Sherman; Mattia de Iulis (#6−7, Annual); Dustin Nguyen (#6−7); Matías Bergara (#13−14); Dillon Snook (#21−22)
- Letterer: Becca Carey
- Colorist: Jordie Bellaire
- Editor: Chris Conroy

Absolute Wonder Woman is a superhero comic book series published by DC Comics, based on the character Wonder Woman. The series is written by Kelly Thompson and illustrated by Hayden Sherman. It began publication on October 23, 2024, as part of DC's Absolute Universe (AU) imprint.

The series focuses on a version of Wonder Woman who was raised in Hell rather than Themyscira and using the nemesis lasso as opposed to the lasso of truth as in most depictions of the character. While stripping away much of what is commonly found in Diana's mainline background, this version spotlights her core attributes of love, compassion and belief in others.

The comic has received critical acclaim due to its characterization of Diana, reinvention of the Wonder Woman mythos, and the artwork by artist Hayden Sherman. It won two Eisner Awards for Best New Series and Best Coloring and was nominated in three additional categories.

== Publication history ==
The existence of the Absolute universe was first rumored in 2023 as a project that writer Scott Snyder was working on, before leaks in 2024 revealed that it would be called the Absolute Universe as part of a wider program called DC All In. These leaks included several creative teams for the various upcoming Absolute Universe series.

In July 2024, a Wonder Woman-focused comic book series titled Absolute Wonder Woman, written by Kelly Thompson and illustrated by Hayden Sherman, was officially announced as part of DC Comics Absolute Universe (AU) imprint. Absolute Wonder Woman began publication on October 23 of the same year. In July 2026, Zoe Thorogood was revealed to have been the original writer for the series, but departed, both because she felt that she was not the right person for the project and the unexpected death of her brother.

== Plot ==
=== The Last Amazon / The Lady or the Tiger (#1–7) ===
On the Wild Isle of Hell, Apollo leaves the infant Diana with Circe, forbidding her from learning of the Amazons. Though Circe initially plans to let her die, she raises Diana instead, who grows strong and compassionate. As an adult, Diana learns of the Amazons' banishment and enters the world to fight evil.

An upside-down pyramid appears over Gateway City, unleashing Harbingers. Diana battles them on Pegasus using the Athena Blade and Nemesis Lasso, reunites with Steve Trevor, and faces the monstrous Tetracide. Unable to stop its mind-compelling "Death of Fear", Diana magically deafens the city to save its people. She adopts the name Wonder Woman after rescuing Barbara Minerva.

After restoring her magically replaced arm, Diana defeats the Tetracide by transforming into Medusa using the Lasso of Sacrifice, then shattering it. She is pulled into the Underworld, where Hades forces her into combat and holds Circe hostage. Recalling the tale of The Lady or the Tiger, Diana chooses freedom, accepting partial bondage to the Underworld by eating a pomegranate seed. She returns Circe home, parting from her at last.

=== As My Mothers Made Me / The Price (#8–14) ===
Veronica Cale and Doctor Poison experiment with the Tetracide's sound while Diana establishes the Hieron as a refuge. Investigating Area 41, Diana enters a submerged maze rumored to hold a lost Amazon.

Flashbacks reveal Diana's divine training under Artemis and Hecate. In the maze, she befriends Ferdinand the minotaur and Petra the siren, learns of Queen Clea's rule, and discovers the trapped Amazon Io. Diana floods the maze, frees its denizens, and restores the Trident of Poseidon. Io escapes to Themyscira, revealing Diana is alive to Queen Hippolyta. Enraged, Veronica plans to unleash Zatanna against Diana.

A lightning creature attacks sites tied to Amazon research, driving Diana into uncharacteristic violence. She learns the creature is the "price" of her magic, an embodiment of balance that ultimately mirrors herself. Believing her death is the solution, Diana is persuaded otherwise by her allies.

Seeking answers, Diana appeals to Gaia, who acknowledges the world's imbalance toward evil and destroys the creature. Back at the Hieron, Diana learns of other heroes like Batman and Superman. News breaks of a murder in Gotham marked with the sigil of Hecate.

=== The Mark of Hecate / Season of the Witch (#15–20) ===
Veronica lures Diana to Gotham using Hecate's mark. Diana allies with Batman to investigate occult murders, uncovering a cult attempting to create a golem. A spell briefly overtakes Diana but is broken by Batman using her talisman. After the church explodes, Diana gives Batman evidence of other heroes, urging him to seek them out—starting with Superman—if they are to save the world.

Diana is invited as the guest of honor to the grand opening of an Amazon exhibit at the Gateway City Natural History Museum, opened by influence from Barbara. While at the event, Diana collapses and when she awakes, she realizes she cannot use her power. The event is suddenly attacked by the Suicide Squad, led by Zatanna, who earlier bound herself to Diana, giving her control of her magic.

Zatanna uses Diana's magic to free herself from Cale's control and teleports away. Diana regains her powers and fights off the other members, growing to enormous size to fight Giganta. When she returns, she sees Cheetah killed by Giovanni Zatara, a burning skeleton man who then melts Diana's arm, forcing her to fly to the Hieron, leaving Barbara behind.

Zatanna appears at the Hieron and cures Diana. After brief fight, Zatanna explains that she wants to save Giovanni, her father, from his curse and needs her help. Diana, now fully prepared, flies back to Gateway City and faces Giovanni with her third lasso, the Troika, which sends her and Giovanni into the Crossroads where they face their greatest fears, before Zatanna pulls them both out. Giganta finds Barbara and kidnaps her under Cale's orders. Seeing that Giovanni has been freed, Cale sends the Iron Maiden, a giant robotic prison, after him. Diana confronts it, allowing Zatanna and Giovanni to escape.

Diana is captured by the Iron Maiden, bringing her to Area 41.X. Cale allows her to see that they've captured Barbara before they begin torturing her. In the Underworld, Persephone convinces Hades to bring Diana back to the Wild Isle, freeing her but leaving her stranded in the Underworld for a month, with no way to help her friends.

=== Friends and Neighbors / Heretic (#21–present) ===
Diana finds her home in the Wild Isle destroyed, with Circe missing. She discovers that Scylla is behind her abduction and travels to her domain, freeing her with Hecate's assistance. At Area 41, Barbara is contacted by Urzkartaga, an ancient god responsible for giving Cheetah her powers. After seeing the previous Cheetah's backstory, Urzkartaga plays on Barbara's desire to become equal to Diana to convince her to become his new Cheetah. She accepts, transforms, and escapes the facility.

In Olympus, Zeus arrives to command Ares to fight Diana, but Ares refuses, proclaiming that she will bring the greatest war the world has ever known. Equipped with new armor and weapons, Diana leaves the Wild Isle and arrives back in Area 41, finding the facility abandoned. After destroying Area 41, Diana confronts Cale at her home, demanding to know where Barbara is. Diana discovers Isadore, Cale's daughter whom she accidentally turned to stone after being cursed by Zatanna. A thunderclap is heard and Diana and Cale see Zeus's eye appear over Gateway City.

== Collected editions ==
=== Hardcovers and trade paperbacks ===
#	Title	Material collected	Format	Pages	Released	ISBN
1	The Last Amazon	Absolute Wonder Woman #1–7	HC	176	August 12, 2025	978-1799505297
1	The Last Amazon	Absolute Wonder Woman #1–7	TPB	176	August 12, 2025	978-1799505303
2	As My Mothers Made Me	Absolute Wonder Woman #8–14	HC	208	February 17, 2026	978-1799507536
2	As My Mothers Made Me	Absolute Wonder Woman #8–14	TPB	208	February 17, 2026	978-1799507543
3	Season of the Witch	Absolute Wonder Woman #15–20 and Absolute Wonder Woman 2026 Annual #1	HC	184	October 27, 2026	978-1799508946
3	Season of the Witch	Absolute Wonder Woman #15–20 and Absolute Wonder Woman 2026 Annual #1	TPB	184	October 27, 2026	978-1799508953
4	Heretic	Absolute Wonder Woman #21–26	HC	184	April 13, 2027	978-1799516163
4	Heretic	Absolute Wonder Woman #21–26	TPB	184	April 13, 2027	978-1799516156

=== Oversized hardcovers ===
#	Title	Material collected	Format	Pages	Released	ISBN
1	Absolute Wonder Woman: Deluxe Edition Vol. 1	Absolute Wonder Woman #1–14	HC	464	August 31, 2027	978-1799513865

== Reception ==
The first 12 issues of the comic book series have gotten a collective positive review from the review aggregator website Comic Book Roundup, holding a strong average critic rating of 9.1 out of 10 for 146 reviews, and a slightly lower average user rating of 8.9 out of 10 for 474 reviews.

Reviewers noted the strong introduction of the series. However, later editions were criticised by some for heavily dense dialogue and slow pacing.

Absolute Wonder Woman won "Best New Series" and Jordie Bellaire won "Best Coloring" at the 2025 Eisner Awards. Additionally, multiple members of the creative team were nominated for their work on Absolute Wonder Woman and other series: Kelly Thompson for "Best Writer", Hayden Sherman for "Best Cover Artist", and Becca Carey for "Best Lettering". In 2026, the first volume was a finalist for "Best Graphic Story or Comic" at the Hugo Awards.
