= Absolute Catwoman =

American superhero comic book

- Textless cover of Absolute Catwoman #1, art by Bengal

Publication information
- Publisher: DC Comics
- Schedule: Monthly
- Format: Limited series
- Genre: Superhero comics
- Publication date: June 10, 2026 – present
- No. of issues: 12
- Main character: Catwoman

Creative team
- Written by: Scott Snyder; Che Grayson
- Artist: Bengal

Absolute Catwoman is an American superhero comic book miniseries published by DC Comics, focusing on the anti-heroine Catwoman. The series, written by Scott Snyder and Che Grayson and drawn by Bengal, began publication on June 10, 2026. The series, set within the publisher's Absolute Universe, was announced as a spin-off of the critically acclaimed Absolute Batman after the Catwoman character's popularity with readers of that series.

== Premise ==
The series follows an alternative version of the Catwoman character within DC's Absolute Universe (as opposed to their main continuity). Co-writers Scott Snyder and Che Grayson emphasized this variant's cunning and use of high-tech gadgets, suits and gear.

Grayson listed Lisbeth Salander of the Millennium series as an inspiration.

== Publication history ==
The Absolute Catwoman miniseries was first announced at New York Comic Con in October 2025. It was later announced again on February 18, 2026, by DC Comics, along with the Absolute Green Arrow series, providing more information about the plot and creative teams of both series, as well as their release dates.

The series originated as a spin-off of the acclaimed Absolute Batman series, in which Selina Kyle (Catwoman's civilian name) was a recurring character from the first issue, and tells the character's story after her appearance in Absolute Batman #14.

The first issue of the series was published in the United States on June 10, 2026, with variant covers by David Nakayama, Sozomaika, Kaare Andrews, and Mateus Manhanini.

In October 2026, the series was announced to be extended to 12 issues, due for release in 2027.

== Plot ==
The series follows a reimagined Selina Kyle in DC Comics' Absolute Universe, portraying its protagonist as a lethal spy and "high-tech wizard." Focusing on an intricate heist, the plot presents a tough and resourceful Selina who utilizes her own advanced suits and technology, distancing herself from her classic role as a cat burglar.

== Collected edition ==
Title	Material collected	Pages	Released	ISBN-10	ISBN-13
Absolute Catwoman: The Yarn	Absolute Catwoman #1–6 and Absolute Cassandra Cain: The Shadow's Hand #1	200	Jul 13, 2027	1-799-51718-7	978-1-79951-718-4
