= Absolute Martian Manhunter =

Comic book series by DC Comics

- Textless cover of Absolute Martian Manhunter #1, art by Javier Rodríguez

Publication information
- Publisher: DC Comics (Absolute Universe)
- Schedule: Monthly
- Format: Limited series
- Genre: Psychological thriller, Science fiction, Superhero
- Publication date: March 26, 2025 – July 1, 2026
- No. of issues: 12
- Main character: John Jones

Creative team
- Written by: Deniz Camp
- Artist: Javier Rodríguez
- Letterer: Hassan Otsmane-Elhaou
- Colorist: Javier Rodríguez
- Editor: Katie Kubert

Absolute Martian Manhunter is a superhero horror comic book miniseries published by DC Comics, based on its character Martian Manhunter. The series is written by Deniz Camp and illustrated by Javier Rodríguez, and was released on March 26, 2025, as part of DC's Absolute Universe (AU) imprint. It is the fifth series from the imprint released in order, and is second in the second batch of Absolute titles, following Absolute Flash and continuing with Absolute Green Lantern.

== Plot ==
=== "Martian Vision" (#1–6) ===
A year after FBI Agent John Jones moves into Middleton, he is caught in a suicide bombing but miraculously survives. To the dismay of his wife Bridget he decides to continue working, subconsciously making realizations about those close to the bomber. When checking in on his mute son Tyler, he points towards a clay figure of a green "martian". John begins seeing multi-colored smoke around people, and when he's talking with the bomber's mother, he breathes in the smoke and experiences the bomber's childhood memories. He runs out into the streets to see the smoke coming out from everyone, as the Martian enters John's mind.

The Martian introduces himself as an otherworldly consciousness, conceptualized in John's head as the familiar imagery of a green alien from Mars; he wishes to work with John in uncovering increasing social unrest in Middleton, which it suspects is being done by an outside force. John is able to use "Martianvision" to see inside the thoughts and memories of the people around him. A shooter named Trigger Taylor heads to Certa Street, a Syrian neighborhood known to the locals as Little Damascus, and begins shooting civilians under suspicion of them being aliens, forcing John and the Martian to head to the scene. The Martian dives into Taylor's mind, allowing John to learn more about him, and he approaches Taylor as his childhood friend Clyde Toomis to defuse the situation. The Martian discovers the psychological anomaly that feeds off Taylor's bigotry and quickly destroys it, but he is killed by a police officer. The Martian realizes that the anomaly was planted by the White Martian, another cosmic entity intent on sowing anti-life within the people of Middleton.

The White Martian's attacks continue to escalate as John tries to keep the Martian a secret to Bridget's dismay. When she finally confronts John about his neglectfulness, the White Martian plunges the city into a blackout, allowing for darkness to corrupt the population. John apologizes to Bridget about his neglectfulness, allowing for his consciousness to "upgrade" and allowing the Green Martian to defeat White. John prepares to tell Bridget about his secret as the White Martian retreats into Tyler's body, who was killed earlier by a pack of poisoned Chocos.

=== "The Agency" (#7-12) ===
3 months later, however, John is living alone in a motel, after Bridget believed him to be insane and kicked him out of the house; The White Martian's defeat proved to only be temporary. Overwhelmed by work, John tries to get drunk at a bar and shouts at the Martian to leave him alone for one night, which he reluctantly does. While John tries to make things up with Bridget, The Martian is captured by The Agency, an organization which claims to protect America from alien ideas. When John wakes up, he is met with a new entity, Despair-the-Zero, who embodies the blue emotions of Despair and Nihilism. As Despair continues to deteriorate John's psyche, the Agency experiments on the Green Martian in Nihilo Bay, the center of a black hole. John drives to Nihilo Bay to rescue the Green Martian, turning the black hole into a white void.

John, now under the influence of Despair-the-Zero and the Green Martian, races to rescue Tyler and Bridget, but gets cornered by the Agency again. As the Martian violently defeats the Agency henchmen, Despair reveals to John two horrible truths: the Martian has been with John his whole life and influencing his actions, leading up to entering the coffee shop that was bombed; and Tyler has been dead for months, with the White Martian controlling his body. John, overwhelmed, collapses in the street, where he's found by Bridget.

Bridget, now psychically linked with John, is able to see the world crumbling and Despair convincing her to kill John. In John's head, a funeral is being held for Tyler, where he's able to see the uncaring Darkseid as the center of the universe. The Martian allows John and Bridget to experience each others lives, revealing how John's FBI career drove a rift between the whole family, and the two reconcile after seeing the difficulties they had to endure. A "full consciousness upgrade" makes Despair-the-Zero disappear for good, and John focuses his attention on Tyler. John is able to recognize how his neglect affected him, and promises not to lose him forever. The White Martian is defeated and reality is restored, and John resigns from the FBI and begins rebuilding his relationships with Bridget and Tyler.

== Publication history ==
By July 2024, a Martian Manhunter-focused comic book series written by Deniz Camp was in the works as part of DC Comics Absolute Universe (AU) imprint, titled Absolute Martian Manhunter. Javier Rodríguez is the illustrator of the comic, and Camp described the title as "one of the most dramatic re-imaginings in the Absolute Universe".

The design for the 'Martian' was created by Rodriguez as a clay sculpture.

Camp cited various sci-fi works and authors that inspired the title, such as 2001: A Space Odyssey, the writings of Ursula K. Le Guin and J. G. Ballard, but the primary influence of the book came from writer Thomas Pynchon, especially his works Inherent Vice and The Crying of Lot 49. He described the book as "psychedelic noir that tackles the big human questions through a small, personal lens".

Absolute Martian Manhunter was released in March 2025. Originally a six-issue miniseries, the book was extended to twelve issues, with the same creative team working on all issues with no fill-ins. The first issue of Absolute Martian Manhunter #1 sold over 120,000 pre-orders in March 2025. The second arc was released in December of the same year.

On February 20, 2026, Camp confirmed that the book would conclude with the 12th issue. However, he expressed that DC Comics was open to the possibility of continuance, and that ending the book was a choice made by both himself and Rodriguez.

== Collected editions ==
=== Hardcovers and trade paperbacks ===
#	Title	Material collected	Format	Pages	Released	ISBN
1	Martian Vision	Absolute Martian Manhunter #1–6	HC	160	November 18, 2025	978-1799505204
1	Martian Vision	Absolute Martian Manhunter #1–6	TPB	160	November 18, 2025	978-1799505211
2	The Agency	Absolute Martian Manhunter #7–12	HC	160	August 25, 2026	978-1799510871
2	The Agency	Absolute Martian Manhunter #7–12	TPB	160	August 25, 2026	978-1799510888

=== Oversized hardcovers ===
#	Title	Material collected	Format	Pages	Released	ISBN
1	Absolute Martian Manhunter: Deluxe Edition	Absolute Martian Manhunter #1–12	HC	384	August 30, 2027	978-1799514244

== Awards ==
The series won the 2026 Eisner Award for Best Limited Series, with artist Javier Rodriguez winning Best Penciller/Inker and Best Cover Artist, as well as Hassan Otsmane-Elhaou winning Best Lettering.
