= Che Grayson =

American filmmaker and artist

- Occupations: Filmmaker; comic book artist; speaker
- Notable work: Absolute Catwoman

Che Grayson is an American comics and television filmmaker and screenwriter. They are best known for their work as a writer for the IDW Publishing series Dark Spaces: Good Deeds and as a co-writer for the DC Comics series Absolute Catwoman.

== Career ==
In 2016, Grayson began publishing the independent comic Rigamo in which a girl named Kera Moore has the power to resurrect the dead through her tears but loses years of her own life and ages each time she uses these powers. Grayson noted that they began publishing this work in the context of significant media attention on racist violence against Black people in the United States, and that their work predated some of the most recognized Black heroines of the 21st century, such as Riri Williams. Rigamo also served as a continuation of the short film of the same name, also centered on the character Kera and produced by Grayson.

In 2020, Grayson's work was included in the second volume of the anthology Power & Magic: The Queer Witch Comics Anthology, produced exclusively by queer women of color and other queer people of color within the femininity spectrum. The anthology also included works by authors such as Steenz, Joamette Gil, and Wendy Xu.

In 2023, Grayson published the supernatural horror miniseries Dark Spaces: Good Deeds with IDW Publishing. The series, which is set in Scott Snyder's Dark Spaces universe, was illustrated by Kelsey Ramsay, with colors by Ronda Pattison and lettering by Shawn Lee.

Between 2025 and 2026, they worked as an artist for issues 4, 11, and 12 of the independent action-horror comic book series Exquisite Corpses, created by James Tynion IV and Michael Walsh, and published by Image Comics and Tiny Onion. The series was noted as a rising star in March 2026 by the website Bleeding Cool.

In December 2025, DC Comics announced the comic book miniseries Absolute Catwoman, written by Grayson along with Scott Snyder and drawn by Bengal. The comic focuses on the anti-heroine Selina Kyle/Catwoman in the publisher's Absolute Universe, and originated as a spin-off of the Absolute Batman series. The first issue of the series was published in the United States on June 10, 2026.

== Personal life ==
Che Grayson identifies with the personal pronouns "they/them".

== Works ==
Self-publishing

- Rigamo (2016–2017)

A Wave Blue World

- Dead Beats: Musical Horror Anthology #2 (September 2021)

DC Comics

- Secrets of Sinister House (December 2019)
- DC Cybernetic Summer (September 2020)
- Dark Nights: Death Metal The Last 52: War of the Multiverses (February 2021)
- Batman: Urban Legends #3, 14–16 (June 2021 to August 2022)
- Legends of the Dark Knight #15 (9 July 2021)
- Wonder Woman Black & Gold #2 (September 2021)
- DC Horror Presents: The Conjuring: The Lover #2 (September 2021)
- Strange Love Adventures (April 2022)
- Absolute Catwoman #1–6 (10 June 2026–present)

IDW Publishing

- Dark Spaces: Good Deeds #1–6 (May 2023 to November 2023)

Image Comics

- Bitch Planet: Triple Feature #2 (July 2017)
- Exquisite Corpses #4, 11–12 (August 2025 to April 2026)

Mad Cave Studios

- Grimm Tales from the Cave (October 2021)

Power & Magic Press

- Power & Magic: The Queer Witch Comics Anthology Volume 2 (1 October 2020)

Tiny Onion

- Razorblades: The Horror Magazine #5 (October 2021)
