= Kingdom of Zod =

Comic book story arc

- Publisher: DC Comics
- Publication date: August – September 2026
- Genre: Superhero
Title(s)
- Superman (vol. 6) #41–42
- Action Comics #1101–1102
- Supergirl (vol. 8) #16–17
- Superman Unlimited #16–17
- Superman: Kingdom of Zod Special #1
- Main characters: Superman; Superboy-Prime; Supergirl; Lois Lane; Superboy (Kon-El); General Zod; Ursa; Eradicatrix

Creative team
- Writer(s): Joshua Williamson; Mark Waid; Dan Slott; Sophie Campbell
- Artists: Rafael Sandoval; Fico Ossio; Edwin Galmon
- Penciller: Eddy Barrows
- Letterer: Ariana Maher
- Colorist: Arif Pianto
- Editor(s): Kathleen Wisneki; Paul Kaminski

"Kingdom of Zod" is a Superman crossover story arc published by DC Comics in August 2026. The series is mainly written by Joshua Williamson, Mark Waid, Dan Slott and Sophie Campbell with artwork by Eddy Barrows, Paolo Villanelli, Osvaldo Pestana Montpeller, and Rachael Stott.

== Publication history ==
On May 7, 2026, DC Comics announced the Kingdom of Zod crossover storyline where Superman and his family investigate a mysterious coup d'état in the country of El Caldero. El Caldero first appeared in the series Superman Unlimited, where it gained access to vast amounts of Kryptonite after a Kryptonite meteor crashed in the area.

== Plot ==
Supergirl stops the battle between the Superboys (Conner Kent and Superboy-Prime) with the help of Krypto and convinces them to work together for a mission at El Caldero. Meanwhile, Lois Lane learns that El Caldero underwent a coup d'état and that the country's new leader demands to speak with her. Supergirl thinks Lois' journey to El Caldero would provide her the perfect opportunity to seize the sun crystal that fell into the country and generated a crystalline fortress in Emerald City, El Caldero's capital. When Supergirl's team enters the fortress, the country's new leader is revealed to be General Zod, who captures Lois and orders the Krypto-Knights and Eradicatrix to distract Supergirl's team while Zod attempts to remove Lois' Kryptonian powers and transfer them back into himself. Zod activates a machine that mutates Kryptonite samples worldwide, causing a Kryptonite plague.

Amidst the Kryptonite plague, Zod explains that he caused the Kryptonite asteroid to head towards Earth as part of his plan to conquer the planet. He did not expect Superman to survive the encounter with the asteroid, but Zod improvised and turned El Caldero, the area in which the asteroid landed, into a global superpower. As Zod successfully transfers Lois' powers back into himself, Steel gathers Lana Lang, Tomorrow Man and Natasha Irons to stop the plague. Superman, his time-displaced younger self, and the Justice League arrive at El Caldero and are infected by the plague, while Supergirl's team are captured by the Krypto-Knights. However, Supergirl evades capture and the Superboys, Conner and Prime, break into Zod's fortress.

The Superboy's lack of coordination allows Zod to gain the upper hand and throw them into El Caldero's Kryptonite mines, while Superman tells his younger self to escape from El Caldero because he is not yet ready to face someone like Zod. Along the way, young Clark finds Supergirl in trouble and saves her. Steel coordinates a plan of attack with the rest of the Justice League while Tomorrow Man tries to save Lois from Zod, who is using armor to protect himself from the Kryptonite. Superman has infiltrated Zod's fortress and acquires his own battle suit to protect his family.

Superman moves the battle to the outskirts of Emerald City to avoid collateral damage. The heavy presence of Kryptonite in the area weakens both combatants, but Zod attacks Superman with brutal precision and burns his right eye. Before Zod can deliver a killing blow, Superman is saved by the Superboys. Zod returns to his fortress and activates the Regeneration Matrix with the dead Ursa inside. The Matrix resurrects Ursa and Zod tells her that they can rule the Earth together, but Ursa rejects and mortally wounds Zod. Instead of ruling a remote planet that barely resembles Krypton, she wants to rule the old Krypton and gets the opportunity to go back in time using the ship the Eradicatrix had stolen from Booster Gold. Young Clark and Supergirl, who had infiltrated Zod's fortress to save their teammates, jump into the ship to stop Ursa from polluting the timeline.

The time bubble arrives on Krypton, approximately one year before its destruction. Ursa attempts to warn anyone who might believe her about the planet's imminent collapse while Supergirl and Superboy try to stop her. Supergirl and Ursa are arrested and interrogated by a younger version of General Zod, while Superboy escapes capture. In El Caldero, Conner and Superboy-Prime keep Superman hidden in a series of lead-lined tunnels to protect him from the Kryptonite plague, which has mutated its victims into mindless zombies.

Superboy locates the detention center Supergirl and Ursa are being held at, while Supergirl knocks Zod out and Ursa escapes and accidentally injures Zor-El, Supergirl's father, before being captured by the El cousins. As the Els prepare to return to their relative present, Zod follows them and tries to steal their time bubble. Meanwhile, Superman and reunited with Lois, Jon and Lana at the mines. Lana tries to absorb the radiation from Superman's body but the effort causes to pass out.

Luckily, Lana recovers and successfully drains the Kryptonite radiation from Superman's body and he learns that his body is learning how to absorb Kryptonite radiation. He plans to use his golden aura to vaporize every last piece of Kryptonite on Earth, but his friends and family warn him that he will only have 200 seconds to do so. Superman accepts the risk and dissipates the plague across the globe. During the flight, he pushes his golden energy to his limits and returns to El Caldero to successfully heal Lana from her Kryptonite poisoning. The process, however, leaves Lana completely powerless. Jon also defeats the Eradicatrix.

Supergirl's allies break out of El Caldero's dungeons and liberate President Eduardo Castilho, who had been imprisoned by Zod, while Tomorrow Man finds Zod's dead body at the fortress. The time bubble arrives at El Caldero, piloted by the young Zod and Ursa, while Superboy and Supergirl have been taken as prisoners. Zod has come to the present because he wants to find a way to save Krypton and releases Superboy and Supergirl as a gesture of goodwill. Superman tries to settle the matter peacefully and avoid further violence but Zod, having acquired superpowers under Earth's sun, decides to conquer the planet, triggering yet another battle with Superman and his allies.

Lena Luthor develops a device that sends the younger Zod and his army back to their time, while Booster Gold reclaims the time bubble but Ursa tries to kill the younger Clark, until Supergirl and Jon convince her to leave Earth peacefully and save what is left of her family by finding her son. Supergirl claims ownership of the Kryptonian fortress in El Caldero and relocates it to Antarctica, turning it into the Fortress of Solidarity, while Reactron prepares for another battle against her. Martian Manhunter erases young Clark's memories before Booster returns him to the past, and Superboy-Prime announces his decision to take a break from superheroism. Conner is secretly resentful at how quickly the Super-Family seems to have accepted Prime into their ranks until Lex Luthor invites Conner for a talk.

== Reading order ==
- Supergirl (Vol. 8) #16 (Part 1)
- Action Comics #1101 (Part 2)
- Superman Unlimited #16 (Part 3)
- Superman (Vol. 6) #41 (Part 4)
- Supergirl (Vol. 8) #17 (Part 5)
- Action Comics #1102 (Part 6)
- Superman Unlimited #17 (Part 7)
- Superman (Vol. 6) #42 (Part 8)
- Superman: Kingdom of Zod Special #1 (Finale)

== Critical reception ==
According to ComicbookRoundup, the entire event received an average rating of 8.2 out of 10 based on 46 reviews.
