= Jordie Bellaire =

American comic book colorist

- Area: Colourist
- Notable works: Batman, Absolute Wonder Woman, The Nice House

Jordie Bellaire is an American comic book writer and colorist who is widely regarded to be one of the greatest colorists of all time. She won the Eisner Award for Best Coloring five times, in 2014, 2016, 2023, 2024, and 2025, and has amassed the second most awards out of any individual in this category.

She is best known for coloring Absolute Wonder Woman, The Nice House, G.I. Joe, Assorted Crisis Events, Catwoman (comic book), Detective Comics, Hawkeye, Batman, The Vision, and Black Widow, among many others.

== Career ==
Following a Tumblr post by Bellaire in early 2013, fans declared January 24 to be "Colorist Appreciation Day", in order to celebrate how much the color adds to the artwork of any given comic. In her post, an open letter titled "I'm mad as hell and I'm not going to take it any more", directed at an unnamed fan convention, she talks about how important the colorist is but how little recognition they get, saying "Colorists are the unknown amazing backup singer that makes every track awesome".

Bellaire is credited with starting the "Comics are for everybody" initiative in 2014 to make the comic book community more inclusive and compassionate.

In 2015, Bellaire along with Declan Shalvey created the poster for the American TV series Agents of S.H.I.E.L.D. episode "One of Us".

== Partial Bibliography ==
=== DC Comics ===
- Tom Strong and the Planet of Peril #1-6 (July - December 2013)
  - Tom Strong and the Planet of Peril (#1-6, written by Peter Hogan, illustrated by Chris Sprouse and Karl Story, 144 pages, 2014, ISBN 978-1-4012-4645-7)
- Detective Comics #1000, #1027, #1034-1058
  - Batman: Detective Comics by Mariko Tamaki Omnibus (incl. var, written by Mariko Tamaki, drawn by Dan Mora, 1000 pages, 2025, ISBN 978-1-7995-0240-1)
- Birds of Prey #1-14 (September 2023 - January 2025)
  - Volume 1: Megadeath (#1-6, written by Kelly Thompson, illustrated by Leonardo Romero, tpb, 152 pages, 2024, ISBN 978-1-77952-558-1)
  - Volume 2: Worlds Without End (#7-13, written by Kelly Thompson, illustrated by Javier Pina, David Lopez, Jonathan Case, Robbie Rodriguez, and Sophie Campbell, tpb, 176 pages, 2025, ISBN 978-1-77952-857-5)
- Absolute Wonder Woman #1−Present (October 2024−Present)
  - Volume 1: The Last Amazon (#1−7, written by Kelly Thompson, illustrated by Hayden Sherman, tpb, 176 pages, 2025, ISBN 978-1-7995-0530-3)
  - Volume 2: As My Mothers Made Me (#8-14, written by Kelly Thompson, illustrated by Hayden Sherman, tpb, 208 pages, 2026, ISBN 978-1-7995-0754-3)
  - Volume 3: Season of the Witch (#15-20, Annual #1, written by Kelly Thompson, illustrated by Hayden Sherman, tpb, 184 pages, 2026, ISBN 978-1-7995-0895-3)
