= Absolute Batman =

Comic book series by DC Comics

- Textless cover of Absolute Batman #1, art by Nick Dragotta

Publication information
- Publisher: DC Comics (Absolute Universe)
- Schedule: Monthly
- Format: Ongoing
- Genre: Superhero fiction
- Publication date: October 9, 2024 – present
- No. of issues: 24 + 1 Annual
- Main character(s): Batman; Alfred Pennyworth; Joker; Killer Croc; Riddler; Two-Face; Penguin; Martha Wayne; Jim Gordon; Catwoman; Harley Quinn

Creative team
- Written by: Scott Snyder
- Artist(s): Nick Dragotta; Gabriel Hernández Walta (#4); Marcos Martín (#7−8); Clay Mann (#11); Jock (#15); Eric Canete (#17−18); Werther Dell'Edera (#22)
- Letterer(s): Clayton Cowles (#1−18); Tom Napolitano (#19− )
- Colorist(s): Frank Martin; Muntsa Vicente (#7−8); Ivan Plascencia (#11)
- Editor(s): Katie Kubert; Andrew Marino (#8−13)

Absolute Batman is an American monthly superhero comic book series published by DC Comics, featuring an alternate version of the character Batman. The series, written by Scott Snyder and illustrated by Nick Dragotta, began publication on October 9, 2024, as the first title in DC's Absolute Universe imprint. It launched alongside Absolute Wonder Woman and Absolute Superman as one of three founding titles in the line.

Absolute Batman #1 became the best-selling comic in the direct market for 2024, selling just under 400,000 copies across multiple printings. The series received an Eisner Award nomination for Best New Series and reached number five on the New York Times Best Seller list in September 2025. By the end of 2025, the title had sold close to three million copies and accounted for approximately 35 percent of the Absolute line's total sales for the year. An animated series adaptation of the comic is currently in development.

== Premise ==
The series stars a 24-year-old blue-collar civil engineer named Bruce Wayne, who operates at night as the vigilante Batman, fighting crime with his self-designed equipment and armor. While doing so, he is stalked by an MI6 agent, Alfred Pennyworth. This version of Bruce grew up in Crime Alley and trained locally rather than traveling the world, relying on self-built equipment rather than inherited wealth. Alfred narrates the series and functions as a moral counterpoint to Bruce: pragmatic and world-weary where Bruce is young and idealistic. The Joker is reimagined as an entrenched, wealthy antagonist, while several characters who are villains in the main continuity (Two-Face, Killer Croc, the Riddler, Catwoman, and the Penguin) are Bruce's close childhood friends.

== Publication history ==
The existence of the new universe was first rumored in 2023 in relation to Scott Snyder, before leaks emerged that it would be called the Absolute Universe as part of a wider program called DC All In. Several additional leaks occurred in the run-up to San Diego Comic-Con in July 2024 when it was officially announced by DC Comics.

And so in July 2024, a Batman-focused comic book series written by Scott Snyder and illustrated by Nick Dragotta was announced as in the works as part of DC Comics' Absolute Universe (AU) imprint, which is overseen by Snyder.

Snyder initially planned to work on the project in a consulting role and used a working-class Batman as the example concept when pitching the AU's central ethos to other writers. Writer James Tynion IV persuaded Snyder to take on the book. Snyder agreed on the condition that Nick Dragotta, known for the Image Comics series East of West, illustrate the series.

Snyder described the development of Absolute Batman as more deliberate than his earlier DC work. One of the earliest design decisions was the character's physical scale. Snyder wanted a Batman who felt like a "primal force", and Dragotta's initial designs were expanded further at Snyder's request.

Absolute Batman began publication on October 9 of the same year, as the first title under the Absolute Universe imprint.

== Characters ==
=== Bruce Wayne / Batman ===
This version of Bruce Wayne was born in Gotham City to Thomas Wayne, an elementary school teacher, and Martha Wayne, a social worker, and grew up in Crime Alley without family wealth. When Thomas is killed in a mass shooting at the Gotham City Zoo during a class field trip, Bruce is left with only his mother. In the aftermath, he pursues studies in applied mechanics, criminal psychology, chemistry, and military theory before returning to Gotham to work across multiple city departments before becoming a civil engineer. Snyder chose the career deliberately because Bruce tends to Gotham's physical infrastructure by day and fights the corruption within it by night, making him someone who builds and repairs things by instinct rather than someone who inherits solutions.

Dragotta designed the character as physically far larger than any previous depiction of Batman (approximately 6.5 ft tall) as a direct consequence of his lack of institutional power and resources. In the costume, every element is functional and self-built. The chest emblem detaches into a battle axe, the cowl ears are removable throwing knives, and the cape consists of articulated mechanical tethers rather than fabric, capable of extending into hooks and spikes. An earlier version of the design had Bruce receiving high-tech materials from childhood friend Eddie Nigma, but Snyder removed the idea on the grounds that it defied Batman's self-reliance.

=== Alfred Pennyworth ===
Alfred Pennyworth is reimagined as a veteran MI6 special agent rather than a domestic servant, arriving in Gotham on assignment to investigate the terrorist organization the Party Animals. In the series' structure, Alfred serves as narrator and point-of-view character, observing and investigating Bruce before gradually becoming an ally. Alfred deduces Batman's identity early in the series and declines orders to eliminate him. Dragotta's design gives Alfred an imposing, disheveled physical presence with silver-streaked hair, a significantly different look from the white-gloved domestic figure of other adaptations.

=== The Joker ===
Stated as the series' central long-term antagonist, the Joker is fully inverted from his mainstream incarnation. Rather than an independent chaos-causer, Jack Grimm V is a coldly calculating billionaire with a generational fortune and a global web of influence. He has never been known to laugh. Alfred, who spent years investigating him before the series begins, traces the Grimm family lineage back to the 1880s, when street performer Joseph "Jack" Grimm turned his success into a business dynasty that expanded through Hollywood, gaming, network news, and online gambling over successive generations.

Alfred believes Jack Grimm V to be the original 19th-century Joseph Grimm, an apparent immortal who has been cycling through identities across more than a century. Snyder conceived the character as an ideological mirror image of Bruce: where Bruce represents collectivism and the belief that systems can be changed from below, the Joker represents the entrenched power of concentrated capital. The Joker's monstrous alternate form, designed by Dragotta with multiple rows of fangs and a hulking physique, was teased gradually from the series' first issue before its full reveal in issue #15.

=== Supporting cast ===
Several characters who are villains in the main DC continuity are close childhood friends of Bruce in this series, all having grown up alongside him in Crime Alley. Waylon Jones (Killer Croc), Eddie Nigma (the Riddler), Oswald Cobblepot (the Penguin), Harvey Dent (Two-Face), and Selina Kyle (Catwoman) each knew Bruce and his parents before the events of the series. Snyder and Dragotta initially planned for these friendships to dissolve quickly into conventional antagonism, but extended them as the series progressed after finding them to be its emotional center. The revelation of Bruce's identity to Waylon in issue #6 was moved forward from its originally planned position after the creative team decided it was the right moment organically. The group's status as allies is tested by the Absolute Bane arc's second storyline, in which Waylon is mutated into a reptilian monster at Ark M, and Eddie, Oswald, and Harvey are attacked and mutilated by Bane.

The series also features James Gordon as the embattled mayor of Gotham, and Roman Sionis (Black Mask) as the leader of the Party Animals, the terrorist organization that drives the first arc's conflict. Bane appears as the primary antagonist of the second arc, reimagined at a near-kaiju scale through his venom-based enhancement, and is portrayed as a direct physical and psychological mirror of Bruce. He has been described by Snyder as "almost like the embodiment of war."

== Plot ==
=== "The Zoo" (#1-6) ===
Alfred Pennyworth is dispatched to Gotham City to investigate the terrorist organization known as the Party Animals, led by Roman Sionis. While in Gotham, he attempts to reconnect with his estranged daughter and learns that the criminal billionaire known as the Joker has evaded surveillance. Meanwhile, Bruce Wayne grows up in Gotham and witnesses the murder of his father during a mass shooting. Traumatized by the event, Bruce later commits himself to combating crime and eventually emerges as Batman.

Batman's first public actions disrupt a Party Animals plot to assassinate Mayor James Gordon. Pennyworth deduces Batman's identity but refuses orders to kill him. As Sionis intensifies attacks using both the Party Animals and corrupt police, Batman exposes Sionis's criminal activities. Although Sionis survives, Batman ultimately defeats him, and Pennyworth rescues the injured vigilante. An epilogue reveals that the Joker orchestrated events behind the scenes and has summoned Bane to Gotham.

=== "Absolute Zero" (#7-8) ===
Following these events, Gotham is placed under martial law after Hamilton Hill defeats Gordon in the mayoral election and authorizes construction of an offshore detention facility known as Ark M. Bruce Wayne investigates Ark M and uncovers connections to cryotechnology developer Victor Fries. Fries, operating as Mister Freeze, uses a prehistoric bacterium in experimental cryogenic research and causes extreme snowfall across the city. Batman confronts Freeze but is overpowered and forced to retreat.

=== "Abomination" (#9-14) ===
Waylon Jones, Bruce's close friend, is later kidnapped, leading Batman to Ark M, a massive underground facility, drawing the attention of the mercenary Bane. Batman attempts a rescue but is defeated and imprisoned by Bane, where he is subjected to months of experimentation involving a venom-based enhancement. He eventually escapes Ark M with the help of a mutated Waylon and returns to Gotham, where he discovers that Bane has mutilated his friends to draw him out. Enraged, he allies with Catwoman, Waylon, and the Red Hood Gang, led by Harley Quinn to stop Bane. Batman defeats Bane by exploiting his reliance on venom, and Joker punishes Bane by ordering a nuke on his home island.

=== "The Joker / Bat Out of Hell" (#15-16) ===
Alfred later recounts the Joker's alleged origins to Bruce, suggesting a long-running criminal lineage tied to the Grimm family. Meanwhile, Joker hunts down one of his victims, transforming into a demonic clown monster, before later returning to his manor in Gotham. Seeking to restore Waylon's humanity, Bruce enlists Wonder Woman's help, ultimately acquiring a magical artifact capable of reversing his transformation.

=== "The Seventh Kingdom" (#17-18) ===
Batman, alongside Officer Barbara Gordon, confronts Poison Ivy, a scientist who, transformed into a hybrid of all kingdoms of life, threatens to infect all the people of Gotham with her spores.

=== "The Straw Man" (#19-25) ===
Gordon asks to meet with Batman on a rooftop and nervously gives him files labeled "Project: Batman", begging Bruce to burn them before unexpectedly jumping off the roof to his death, due to Scarecrow's fear toxin. Batman is publicly blamed for Gordon's death as Slade Wilson announces the Robin Program, a paramilitary force of young people adopted by Jack Grimm V, to take down Batman.

Bruce tries to research "Project: Batman". Scarecrow tells him that his mother, Martha Wayne, worked for the Court of Owls as their Talon, and that he and Jack Grimm manipulated events for Bruce to become Batman, all as an elaborate joke. Batman is attacked by the Robins, wearing high tech armor and piloting giant mechs, but Batman manages to escape them. His friends and allies try to help Bruce, warning him not to fall for Scarecrow and Grimm's manipulations, but Bruce cuts off ties with them as he becomes more erratic and paranoiac. He attempts to give himself up to Robins, Jason Todd and Tim Drake, but Clayface, a shapeshifting monster sent by the Joker, kills Tim in the form of Batman.

== Themes and motifs ==
Snyder has described the series as a deliberate inversion of the classic Batman mythology's ideological framework. Snyder described it as: "It's not just Bruce without resources, it's Bruce as chaos and anarchy, and the more villainous characters as order, the system".

The series engages with contemporary political concerns, such as gun violence and institutional corruption.

== Reception ==
Absolute Batman was praised for its writing and art, being called "a bold reinvention" of the character and "a masterwork of action storytelling", yet criticized for "the flat characterization of its villain" and the story's lack of consequences. ComicBook.com gave credit for the "insane story" and "genuine appreciation for the emotional core of the character".

SFX magazine, reviewing the first three issues, wrote that Dragotta's art pushed "what's already an enjoyable experiment into a jaw-dropping slam-dunk" and called it "one of the most exciting superhero comics in a long while," comparing the visual energy of its action sequences to Akira. AIPT reviewing the first arc's conclusion praised Dragotta's page layouts as "superb" while noting that the pace left little room for consequences, finding Batman's recovery between issues to be "somewhat unearned."

The series carries a composite score of 8.8 out of 10 based on more than 269 critic reviews on ComicBookRoundup. The 2025 Annual received particular critical attention. The Comics Beat described Daniel Warren Johnson's lead story as "the angriest comic you'll read all year" and praised the creative team for being aware of how superhero stories tackling political subjects "can be sanded down to talking points for keyboard warriors," commending the choice to tell the story despite that risk. But Why Tho? gave the Annual a score of 4.5 out of 5, praising it for presenting violence as "devastating and grim and always having consequences" rather than simply satisfying.

The series received an Eisner Award nomination for Best New Series in 2025, losing to Absolute Wonder Woman by Kelly Thompson and Hayden Sherman. DC executive editor Chris Conroy told Publishers Weekly that the Eisner recognition was unexpected: "I'm still blown away by the level of recognition, even from the Eisners. We love sales, but it's incredible to hear your peers saying, 'Yes, this was the best work of the year.'"

The series received five Eisner Award nominations in 2026, including Best One-Shot/Single Issue, Best Continuing Series, Best Writer (for Snyder), and Best Cover Artist (for Dragotta). That same year, it won the Harvey Award Book of the Year.

== Sales ==
Snyder stated that DC's original sales estimate had been 100,000 copies per issue. However, due to high pre-order numbers, the first issue of Absolute Batman had a print run of around 250,000 copies. By the end of 2024, the title become the best-selling comic of the year, with combined sales of first, second, third, and black-and-white printings selling just under 400,000 copies. Within the first eleven months, the first issue went through eight printings, with subsequent issues being reprinted as well.

Sales for Absolute Batman surpassed those of the year's other major direct-market debut comics, including Teenage Mutant Ninja Turtles #1, which had sold over 300,000 copies, and Transformers #1, the highest-selling comic of 2023. Reporting by Popverse found that the first printing alone sold an estimated 275,000 copies, with subsequent reprints driven by word-of-mouth in the weeks following the book's release around New York Comic Con 2024. DC's press release described Absolute Batman #1 as "undisputedly the bestselling comic of 2024", a claim Bleeding Cool contested, noting that children's comics such as Dog Man: The Scarlet Shedder sold considerably more copies when bookstore sales are included, though those figures come from a different distribution channel than the direct market tracked by DC's claim.

The series continued to build commercially through 2025. Absolute Batman #15, which revealed the Joker's origin, sold over 300,000 copies. According to figures shared by DC, the Absolute Universe line sold over 8.2 million units in 2025 (not counting December), with Absolute Batman accounting for approximately 35 percent of those sales, close to 3 million copies.

In September 2025, Absolute Batman reached #5 on the New York Times Best Seller list.

== In other media ==
=== Television ===
In June 2026, during the Annecy International Animation Film Festival, it was announced an animated series adaptation of Absolute Batman is currently in development at Warner Bros. Animation and DC Studios. Scott Snyder will serve as showrunner and executive producer on the series, while Nick Dragotta serves as producer. The series was originally planned to be fully CG animated, but at the New York Comic Con in October, Peter Girardi announced they were pivoting to 2D animation.

=== Video games ===
The Absolute Universe version of Batman and Catwoman appears as outfits for the characters in Lego Batman: Legacy of the Dark Knight.

== Collected editions ==
=== Hardcovers and trade paperbacks ===
#	Title	Material collected	Format	Pages	Released	ISBN
1	The Zoo	Absolute Batman #1–6	HC	176	Aug 5, 2025	978-1799505242
1	The Zoo	Absolute Batman #1–6	TPB	176	Aug 5, 2025	978-1799505259
2	Abomination	Absolute Batman #7–14	HC	240	Feb 3, 2026	978-1799507505
2	Abomination	Absolute Batman #7–14	TPB	240	Feb 3, 2026	978-1799507512
3	Devil's Workshop	Absolute Batman #15−18, Absolute Batman 2025 Annual #1 and Absolute Batman: Ark M Special #1	HC	208	September 8, 2026	978-1799508908
3	Devil's Workshop	Absolute Batman #15−18, Absolute Batman 2025 Annual #1 and Absolute Batman: Ark M Special #1	TPB	208	September 8, 2026	978-1799508915
4	The Straw Man	Absolute Batman #19–25	HC	208	Mar 2, 2027	978-1799516200
4	The Straw Man	Absolute Batman #19–25	TPB	208	Mar 2, 2027	978-1799516194

=== Oversized Hardcovers ===
#	Title	Material collected	Pages	Released	ISBN
1	Absolute Batman: Deluxe Edition Vol. 1	Absolute Batman #1-14	424	August 24, 2027	978-1799514275
