= Absolute Flash =

Comic book series published by DC Comics

- Textless cover of Absolute Flash #1, art by Nick Robles

Publication information
- Publisher: DC Comics (Absolute Universe)
- Schedule: Monthly
- Format: Ongoing
- Genre: Superhero
- Publication date: March 19, 2025 – present
- No. of issues: 19
- Main character(s): The Flash; Barry Allen; Gorilla Grodd

Creative team
- Written by: Jeff Lemire
- Artist: Nick Robles
- Letterer: Tom Napolitano
- Colorist: Adriano Lucas
- Editor: Andrew Marino

Absolute Flash is a superhero comic book series published by DC Comics, based on the character of The Flash. The series is written by Jeff Lemire and illustrated by Nick Robles, and began publication on March 19, 2025, as part of DC's Absolute Universe (AU) imprint. It is the fourth title from the Absolute Universe, and the first title of the second wave of Absolute comics released in 2025.

== Premise ==
A young Wally West must understand and train with his powers. Unlike most interpretations of the Flash, there is no Speed Force or Flash family, so Wally must learn to use more dangerous powers without any mentors to help him.

== Plot ==
=== "Of Two Worlds" (#1–3) ===
Two days ago, 15-year-old Wally West walks back home late to the army base Fort Fox, where he and his father, Colonel Rudy West, live. Arriving, he meets with Barry Allen, a friend and scientist working at Fort Fox. Barry shows Wally his lab and invites him to work part time on the cutting edge "Project Olympus" government research experiment, but Rudy storms in, chastises Wally for being late, and tells Barry not to talk to his son. The next day at their home, Rudy attempt to talk things out with Wally, but it quickly devolves into an argument that ends with Wally storming out. Outside, Wally sees something strange is happening inside Barry's lab. He enters, discovering a mutated green monkey that scares him. Running deeper inside the building, he finds Barry, dressing in a red containment suit, sitting inside a large machine with bizarre energy all around. Barry yells at Wally to run, but it's too late: Wally is consumed by the energy. Rudy comes in and angrily starts beating Barry, demanding to know what he did to his son, only to realize that Wally is behind him, glowing red with the exotic energy. Rudy and Barry try to calm him, but the frightened Wally freaks out and runs, unknowingly having connected with Barry with the energy and dragging him along as he travels at superhuman speeds, accidentally killing him.

In the present day, Wally is being afflicted by his new powers. As he reflects on the events that have occurred, he sees that he is being hunted down and runs into the cave where he left Barry's corpse. His pursuers are the Rogues, a special-ops team with experimental equipment, signed up with Project Olympus, consisting of Captain Leonard Snart, Digger Harkness, Lisa Snart, and Jesse James. Leonard tells his team bring the boy in alive. As Wally grieves over accidentally killing Barry, he is discovered by Harkness's flying boomerangs, forcing him out for an ambush. Wally is captured by Jesse's force field tech, but quickly manages to escape and outrun Lisa's flying gear. As he runs, his powers cause him to uncontrollably travel across his timeline and see visions of his past, present, and two possible futures: one where he is a hero and another where he becomes a horrifying energy monster. Leonard, fed up with Wally, orders the Rogues to release Grodd, revealed to be the small green monkey Wally saw in the lab. Grodd follows Wally into a barn, where he psychically connects with the boy, revealing that they both lost their moms, Wally's committed suicide and Grodd's was killed as he was taken to be experimented on by Project Olympus. Now psychically bonded, Grodd declares "Wally Grodd same" and helps Wally overcome his fear and clears his mind. When the Rogues blow up the barn they are in, Grodd retaliates with a psychic attack against the Rogues. Wally fights back against Harkness, and he and Grodd run off together. Wally returns to the cave to bury Barry and takes his containment suit.

Flash-forward a year later, in the destroyed Project Olympus facility, a mysterious hooded man emerges from a mirror, and begins observing various past future events as he declare it's "time to make this world fall".

=== "The Trials of the Flash" (#4–7) ===
==== "Iron Heights" ====
Wally has a nightmare of his mother's grave and Barry's corpse rising out it before waking up in a park. With Grodd hiding in his backpack, Wally enters Iron Heights, a district of Central City. While waiting in line for food, he is approached by Ralph Dibny, who offers Wally to stay at a youth mission he and his wife run. There, Wally meets with Linda Park, who asks him what he is running from. Meanwhile, the Rogues observe an anomaly left by Wally before it implodes. Rudy West chews the team out for letting Wally and Grodd escape before heading back to Fort Fox to figure out what Allen was doing in his lab. While investigating the wreckage of the experiment, Rudy is approached by the lead scientist of Project Olympus, Dr. Elenore Thawne, who is indirect in telling him about the truth of what Barry was doing. She tells him that Wally is the greatest success to come out the Project, which angers Rudy. She then reveals that they know where he is as they are tracking Grodd, before showing him that other test subjects escaped the night Wally got his powers. Back at the mission, before heading to bed, Wally realizes that Grodd has left his backpack and is running away. Wally runs after Grodd into the sewers, where Grodd says they have to stop "hot". The two then come face to face with the escaped Project Heat Wave, a humanoid creature made of lava.

Wally tries to reach out to it, but his powers hurt the creature, who angrily attacks him. Heat Wave emerges from the sewers, threatening Ralph, Linda, and others in the mission. Thawne informs the Rogues that they have a lock on Wally and that Grodd has led him to Mick Rory, surprising Leonard who was told he did not survive the experiments. He angrily asks what else she has lied to them about, but Thawne says that she is prepared to explain more of Project Olympus' true goals later. Grodd comforts a frightened Wally and tells him that the people need them both for help. Wally puts on the suit and confronts Heat Wave. Grodd tells Wally to help the creature by taking the heat from him. Wally does so and suddenly has a vision of standing on an asteroid as a giant dark hand reaches out for him. Wally is then awakened by Ralph, and sees that Mick Rory has returned to his human form. Ralph and Linda ask Wally to let them help him, but he sees a helicopter and runs away. At Fort Fox, Thawne tells the Rogues to deploy immediately, only to realize that Rudy is not there. Rudy uses Barry's badge to enter a locked room, where he discovers a strange craft and bodies of aliens inside tanks.

The Rogues' backstory is revealed: six months prior, Harkness is thrown out of a bar in Oklahoma for flirting with someone's sister. He is then approached by his old colonel, Rudy West, who offers Harkness a chance to wipe his slate clean and start over. Harkness accepts for the chance to blow stuff up. Next, Rudy travels to Kansas, where Leonard is taking care of Lisa after she lost both of her legs. Rudy talks with Leonard about the situation they are in and he gives them an offer to get both of them the help they need. Later, as Rudy is trying to call Wally, he is informed by Leonard that Jesse is there, having put trackers on everyone to prepare for the day Rudy comes for them. Jesse believes that Rudy has come to imprison them, being four court-martialed, disgraced soldiers that went rogue on a mission in Syria and took bribes from a foreign government. Rudy assures them that he has a mission for them, one so dangerous that no one in their right mind would volunteer for. Rudy takes the group to Fort Fox and there they are introduced to Allen and Thawne, who show them the advanced technology Project Olympus is working on. Thawne reveals that their plans for the Rogues is not to give them weapons, but rather to make them into weapons. When Jesse asked where the tech came from, Allen says it is classified. A flashback to 1940 in the Mojave Desert is shown, where two men named "Thawne" and "Garrick' are working on an experiment similar to what Barry Allen was working on in the present. Garrick tries to shut the machine down, but Thawne throws him into the energy field to stop him, which destroys Garrick's body. Barry and Elenore tell the Rogues that their choice is either to sign the waivers or go to prison for treason for the rest of their lives. The team accepts. In the present day, Rudy, after discovering the aliens in Fort Fox, calls Wally and tells him that he loves him. Wally answers but Rudy is then bound and gagged by Elenore's soldiers.

As a storm starts breaking out, Wally and Grodd walk into a gas station for food, as Wally's reflection smirks at them. When the cashier refuses to give him food without money, Wally uses his speed to gather up food but he passes out from hunger. At Fort Fox, Thawne's men are about to kill Rudy, but he convinces her that he will do whatever Project Olympus wants to get Wally back. He asks about the aliens in the tanks and Elenore tells him that they were the first to discover God. Wally wakes up in a police holding cell, where a cop unknowingly reveals that Grodd is not in his backpack. The Rogues suddenly burst in through the wall, knocking out the cop. Snart gives Wally an offer to find Grodd and they will all go back to Fort Fox. With his powers not working because of his hunger, Wally agrees and the Rogues release him, giving him an energy bar to refuel his powers. But as the storm grows too bad for the Rogues' Prowler to go further, Wally runs off without them to find Grodd. When he finds him, Wally is struck by lightning, and sees a white-bearded man with glowing eyes standing over them. The man, the cause of the storm, believes Wally is trying to take him back to Fort Fox and fights him with his weather powers. Wally, taking multiple lightning strikes, decides to let it in, restoring him to full powers and ending his hunger, which gives him the edge to take out the foe, lifting the storm. When the Rogues arrives, Wally tells them that he and Grodd are not going back, to which Snart responds they are not either. He tells his confused team that they have the power to do what they want now, and invites Wally to go Rogue with them.

=== The Life and Death of Barry Allen (#8) ===
Years prior, Barry gives a lecture on quantum mechanics at Keystone University as Elenore Thawne watches him. She visits with him in his office, where she introduces herself as a follower of his quantum mechanics work at Princeton before it was shut down after the administration believed his theories too radical. She offers him the opportunity to continue his work and make unbelievable discoveries. Barry is skeptical but he gives her one day to convince him. She flies him out to Fort Fox, where she shows him the research she's been doing. Elenore tells Barry about her grandfather, Eobard Thawne, the head of a secret government research project called Blue Trinity which was attempted to make contact with a dimension of pure energy. Eobard becomes obsessed with the project and refuses to stop even after the military shuts the project down, as he claimed he heard a voice from the dimension calling to him. Just as he activates a machine in the desert that opens a portal to the other dimension, an army officer named Jay Garrick arrive and tries to shut the machine down, only for Eobard to push him into the energy field, destroying him. Elenore tells Barry that Eobard was never seen again and she has spent most of her life trying to fill the gaps in his research journal. More interested in Elenore's chalkboard equations, Barry erases them and begins correcting them, tell her that he will need his equipment from Princeton.

Two years later, Barry, becoming obsessed as Eobard had, has completed rebuilding the portal generator and is working on containment suits for a survey into the dimension. Elenore introduces Rudy West as the new head of security at the Fort for their new military division, which Barry dislikes, seeing building weapons as a distraction from their real work. Elenore further upsets him when she tells him he will not be leading the team into the alternate dimension as it's too dangerous. While in a cafeteria for dinner, he sees Wally West eating alone and bonds with him. A week later, a three-person team wearing Barry's suit enters the dimension, termed "the Still Point". Before they can start collecting samples of the "Red Matter", the team discovers an alien spacecraft, which they move into their reality. Project Olympus begins studying the ship's technology and the alien corpses, which will lead them to create the Rogue's equipment and modified creatures like Grodd. Barry does not care about any of this and still wants to enter the Still Point and collect Red Matter. He gets into an argument with Elenore who tells him that they will not bring samples from the dimension until they are sure it is absolute safe. Dejected, Barry walks into the portal chamber room, where he receives a vision of a future version of himself in a containment suit with red lightning all around him. Future Barry tells him to stop and that Wally West must be the one before disintegrating.

=== Rogues' Revenge (#9–12) ===
In the present, Wally initially refuses the Rogues' offer, but after they inform him that Rudy is in trouble and Grodd confirms they're not lying, he agrees. Unbeknownst to them, Trickster is still loyal to Thawne and is streaming everything they're saying to Project Olympus. As the Rogues and Wally fly back to Fort Fox, Wally begins sees overwhelming visions of himself in the near past and future. When Snart contacts the Fort, Elenore answers and tells Trickster to secure Wally as a missile is launched at the Prowler, destroying it. Wally is held in Trickster's force bubble as Grodd saves the rest of the Rogues with a telepathic force field, who passes out. Wally escapes Tricksters bubble and Glider knocks her out.

Wally is led to Barry's lab where he hears a voice he believes is Barry's, but it turns out to be Eobard Thawne, now mutated in a towering monster. Eobard throws Wally into the Still Point, where he meets the spirits of Barry and two alien scientists, who explain to him the realm of the Still Point and explain how they can get him back home. Eobard rampages throughout Project Olypmus, with the Rogues, Elenore, and Rudy all working to stop him. Wally returns from the portal and fights Eobard. Trickster creates a mobile portal to send Eobard back, with Rudy sacrificing himself to push Eobard back through. Wally demands they open it again, but the Rogues are unable to. Distraught, Wally vows to find his father and returns to the Dinby's Mission. Grodd reunites with his father, who declares "all men are bad".

=== Mirror Mirror (#13–18) ===
After trying to figure out what to do next, Wally bonds with Linda, showing her his powers and talking about their troubled pasts. Linda suggests looking for Elenore, who disappeared in the conflict with Eobard, to open the door to the Still Point and rescue Rudy. They go to the abandoned remains of Project Olympus to find clues of her whereabouts, but are suddenly pulled into the Mirror Dimension by a group of clones of Mirror Master.

== Publication history ==
By July 2024, Jeff Lemire and Nick Robles were attached to write Absolute Flash, part of DC Comics' Absolute Universe imprint. The title was released in March 2025.

Lemire chose to write the Flash because of a lack of a teenage perspective from the original catalog, having a lighter tone than the rest of the Absolute Universe titles, as well as Lemire having grown with Wally and favoring him.

== Collected editions ==
#	Title	Material collected	Format	Pages	Released	ISBN
1	Of Two Worlds	Absolute Flash #1–6	HC	144	December 23, 2025	978-1799505181
1	Of Two Worlds	Absolute Flash #1–6	TPB	144	December 23, 2025	978-1799505198
2	Still Point	Absolute Flash #7–12	HC	176	June 23, 2026	978-1799508380
2	Still Point	Absolute Flash #7–12	TPB	176	June 23, 2026	978-1799508397
3	Mirror Mirror	Absolute Flash 13–18	HC	176	December 8, 2026	978-1799509936
3	Mirror Mirror	Absolute Flash 13–18	TPB	176	December 8, 2026	978-1799509943
