= Absolute Superman =

Comic book series by DC Comics

- Textless cover of Absolute Superman #1, art by Rafa Sandoval

Publication information
- Publisher: DC Comics (Absolute Universe)
- Schedule: Monthly
- Format: Ongoing
- Genre: Superhero fiction
- Publication date: November 6, 2024 – present
- No. of issues: 24
- Main character(s): Superman; Lois Lane; Jimmy Olsen; Ra's al Ghul; Brainiac; Talia al Ghul; Hawkman; John Henry Irons

Creative team
- Written by: Jason Aaron
- Artist: Rafa Sandoval
- Letterer: Becca Carey
- Colorist: Ulises Arreola
- Editor: Chris Conroy

Absolute Superman is a superhero comic book series published by DC Comics, based on the Absolute Universe character Superman. The series is written by Jason Aaron and illustrated by Rafa Sandoval, and began publication on November 6, 2024, as part of DC's Absolute Universe (AU) imprint. The series is Aaron's second work on the character Superman, after the three-issue story arc "I, Bizarro", published in Action Comics #1061–1063.

In this universe, Kal-El's ship crashes on Earth, but lands near an industrial city, controlled by mega-corporations, private armies, and corrupt politicians, and thus is not raised with love and hope by the Kents, marking a different pathway to becoming a hero.

== Premise ==
The series focuses on a version of Superman who arrives on Earth as an adolescent, rather than a baby, as he does in most depictions of the character.

== Publication history ==
The existence of the new universe was first rumored in 2023 in relation to Scott Snyder, before leaks emerged that it would be called the Absolute Universe as part of a wider program called DC All In. Several additional leaks occurred in the run-up to San Diego Comic-Con in July 2024 when it was officially announced by DC Comics.

And so by July 2024, a Superman-focused comic book series titled Absolute Superman, written by Jason Aaron and illustrated by Rafa Sandoval, was announced as part of DC Comics Absolute Universe (AU) imprint. Rafael Albuquerque was originally set to illustrate Absolute Superman, but had to pull out of the project due to severe floods in his home country of Brazil, with Sandoval being brought onto the project a month before the comic's announcement.

Absolute Superman began publication on November 6 of the same year.

== Plot ==
=== "Last Dust of Krypton" (#1−6) ===
Kal-El grows up on the planet Krypton with his father Jor-El and mother Lara Lor-Van, raised on a farm in the Redlands as a member of the Labor Guild, the lowest class in Krypton's enforced caste system. The symbol of the Guild, which is required to be worn by its members at all times, is the stylized "S" worn by the El family of the mainline DC Universe. Both of Kal's parents are scientists and were once members of the Science League, the ruling class of Krypton, before they were banished from the League for questioning their authority. While working in a mine, Jor-El discovers Krypton is on the brink of destruction due to environmental recklessness on the part of the Science League. Planning to escape the planet before it explodes, Jor-El and Lara develop intelligent spacesuits and a spaceship to take as many of their neighbors with them as they can. As the environmental decay of Krypton worsens, Jor-El attempts to appeal to the Science League to acknowledge the coming destruction, but is imprisoned for scientific heresy. Lara breaks him out of prison, and soon after their home is attacked by the Law Guild. It is revealed that the Science Guild has developed ships, and feigned ignorance to Jor-El's warnings in order to quietly save themselves. The El family manages to flee on their ship, taking their neighbors with them as the planet collapses, but the ship is struck by rubble and destroyed. Lara's adaptive suits construct miniature spaceships around them, but Kal-El is the only member of the group to have seemingly survived.

Seventeen months later, Kal arrives on Earth and lands in Smallville, Kansas, where he is taken in by Jonathan and Martha Kent. The Kents are an elderly couple struggling to run their farm, due to the villainous Lazarus Corporation using rain-prevention technology to force the Kents into selling their land. Kal wakes up from his coma and helps the couple on their farm, before the artificial intelligence in his suit, named Sol, comes back online and lets him understand and speak English, after which he destroys the rain-preventing drones that are hovering over the Kent's farm. A passerby sees Kal and reports him to the Lazarus Corp as an undocumented immigrant. Lazarus sends a military dispatch led by "Peacemakers" to arrest Kal, but he escapes by flying away.

Six years later, Kal is attacked by peacemakers in a diamond mine in Brazil, for using his super speed to help the workers meet quota. When Kal exhausts himself by creating a solar flare to defend himself, Agent Lois Lane handcuffs herself to him, but he flies away with her attached to keep her from being shot by the peacemakers. When the Lazarus forces continue to fire at them, Lois helps Kal get the people around them to safety. Sol unlocks the handcuffs and Kal flies away, leaving Lois fascinated by the encounter. Lois interviews eyewitnesses of Kal from Lazarus work camps in Dharavi, Orapa, Lages, Minsk, Juárez, Lai Châu, Cape Winelands, Pine Ridge, and Cairo, who all call him Superman. Lois tracks Kal to Orangi Town, where she is followed by Jimmy Olsen, a member of the anti-corporate terrorist group the Omega Men. The two fight before Jimmy is aided by Omega Primus, the group's leader, and Lois is saved by Kal, who tells her to stop looking for him before he flies away. Christopher Smith, one of the peacemakers, lashes out on a crowd of civilians laughing at him after Kal escapes, murdering several.

After Kal learns about Smith's actions in Orangi, he forcefully enters a Lazarus military base but is unable to find him. Sol tells Kal that someone named Brainiac is attempting to infiltrate his suit's system to communicate with him, and that Brainiac is offering Smith's location in exchange for speaking with Kal. Kal flies to Kansas instead, telling Sol that he no longer wants to find Smith, worried about not being able to stop himself from killing Smith if he does.

At a Lazarus R&D center in Nevada, Brainiac discusses plans with the director of Lazarus, revealed to be Ra's al Ghul, who, as he rises out of a Lazarus Pit, proclaims that Superman will kneel before him.

=== "Son of the Demon" (#7−11) ===
Three Omega Men agents break into the Nevada facility, but two are horrifically killed and one maimed and captured by Brainiac, revealed to be a grotesque alien cyborg. As Brainiac dissects and dismembers the still-living Omega Man, he expresses anger at still being unable to figure out what Superman is and takes it out on the shrunken prisoners in his bottled cities. He tells the Omega Man his story: he was once Brainiac 419,732, a Level Zero Effector created by the Brainiac Collective for the sole purpose of shoveling a flow of dead Brainiac corpses into a ship's liquidator for the entirety of his life. After years of isolation, and being forced to kill a still living and violent Brainiac, 419,732 slowly became insane. At some point, the corpses stopped arriving, and Brainiac left the room to discover that all the other Brainiacs had died. He declared himself the one and only Brainiac and began traveling across the universe, bottling up cities, before arriving on Earth. In the present day, Brainiac reluctantly contacts the Brainiac Collective to ask for potential information on Superman. Most of the Collective dismiss the idea of a being described in his submitted data, but one Brainiac identifies the Sunstone from Krypton. She sends Brainiac a chemical makeup of the radioactive material she collected from its remains. Brainiac ends the transmission when another asks who he is. Brainiac kills the Omega Man agent and begins synthesizing a sample of the radioactive material. Later, he visits another lab where a conscious Smith is being forcibly converted into a cyborg. As Smith begs him to kill him, Brainiac assures him that he is not being punished, but rather being prepared for deployment to the soon-to-be most dangerous warzone in the world: Kansas.

In Metropolis, Ra's al Ghul conducts an earnings call with his "League of Shareholders" while fighting three Omega Men assassins. As he kills them, turning one into an infant using a Lazarus Pit before throwing it off his skyscraper, Ra's tells his shareholders of his past and that Lazarus's "day of resurrection" is at hand. In Smallville, Kal visits Martha Kent in senior living, but she doesn't recognize him due to her Alzheimer's. As Kal walks down Smallville's main road, he is met by Lois and Jimmy. Kal doesn't want anything to do with them, but gets involved when the two start fighting each other. Suddenly, Kal is shot in the chest and collapses. Lois and Jimmy make a truce to protect Superman and drag him to a drug store. Peacemakers start swarming the town, led by the now cybernetically augmented Smith. Sol struggles to remove the bullet, revealing it originated from Krypton. Smith breaks into the store and fights the weakened Superman, who uses his armor's battle mode for an emergency reserve of solar power, but is defeated by Smith once he shoots him with more radioactive bullets. Jimmy calls in a boom tube and the Omega Men, led by Primus, fight off the Peacemakers and pull Superman through the tube, leaving Lois behind.

The Omega Men and Kal work to remove the bullets from his body, finding it extremely difficult due to Kal's near-invulnerablity. When they have one final bullet left, Primus, despite protests, orders the use of "the box", which teleports the bullet out of Kal's body. Meanwhile, Lois is visited by Ra's in her holding cell. She correctly assumes that Ra's is not here to kill or fire her, but has a new assignment for her, which she will be forced to do under threat of her father's prosthetic legs being removed. When Lois tells Ra's that Superman has changed everything and Ra's himself has become small, Ra's corrects her by saying that he will simply kill her father if she refuses his orders to bring Superman to him. Weeks later, Superman has joined the Omega Men in attacking and disarming Peacemaker facilities, though refuses to use lethal force despite Primus' encouragement to. Back at their headquarters, Kal talks to Jimmy about the box, revealing it to be called a Father Box which showed him a vision of Earth with giant fire pits. Jimmy says that future will happen if Lazarus isn't stopped. The Omega Men are called on another mission to save protestors in Karachi being held prisoners by Peacemakers. They arrive to find that the protestors have already been hanged, enraging Kal. He nearly lets Primus execute a Peacemaker, but catches the bullet at the last second. Primus confronts him about this at their headquarters, telling him to join her in killing every Peacemaker, including Smith and Ra's, but Kal tells her that he is leaving and warns her not to follow him. Before he can, an Omega Man agent tells Primus that Jimmy was left behind and has been captured by Lazarus, currently being interrogated by Lois Lane.

Kal attacks the Lazarus research facility where Jimmy is being held. He easily defeats all of the facility's defenses and troops, though without killing them, much to the frustration of the onlooking Ra's and Brainiac. Primus and the Omega arrive and start fighting with the Peacemakers. Smith confronts Kal, but is quickly dispatched by the Kryptonian. Kal considers killing Smith, but remembers a lesson taught to him by his father to never lose sight of what is cruel. Primus attempts to kill Smith herself, but Kal stops her. Ra's arrives to the scene, with Lois and Jimmy in tow. Ra's attempts to kill Smith with a kryptonite bullet for his weakness, but Superman catches the bullet, injuring his hand. Ra's calls Superman "his son", telling him that he will use his strength to save the planet. Suddenly, Primus stabs Kal in the back with a kryptonite blade and knocks out Lois when she tries to stop her. As the Peacemaker massacre the rest of the Omega Men, Ra's tells Superman that he's not yet ready to be his child, but he and "his sister", Primus, revealed to be Talia al Ghul, will teach him.

Kal is held in hundreds of virtual simulations by Brainiac, forcing him to relive his most horrible moments in order to force him into killing. He appears to escape the simulation once and tries to convince Brainiac's clones to see liberty from their master, but it is just another simulation. Talia visits Jimmy and Lois in their cell. Jimmy asks why Primus would betray the Omega Men, but Lois tells him that Lazarus and the Omega Men were always two sides of the same coin. Talia reveals their plan to rebuild a new world order by mentally breaking Superman and having him kill a majority of Earth's populace, his first test being Jimmy and Lois. Weeks pass and Superman still refuses to kill Brainiac's virtual self, much to the latter's frustration. Brainiac's clones, inspired by Superman whispering to them subconsciously, have also started rebelling against him and are killed brutally by their master. Meanwhile, Sam Lane arrives at the base, fights off the Peacemakers and frees Lois and Jimmy from their cell. They break into Brainiac's lab to free Kal, though Sam is killed by Talia. Kal is being subjected to a simulation of him being abducted from the Kents, this time killing the Peacemakers, Ra's, Talia and the Omega Men. The virtual Kents tell him that they are proud of him and they embrace. Kal awakens from the simulation and nearly kills Brainiac but is stopped by the released Sol.

=== "The Battle of Kansas" (#12−14) ===
Sol takes over Kal and flies him, Lois, and Jimmy out to Smallville, where he helps Kal control his anger, allowing him to decompress by creating a miniature sunstone fortress around him. Flashbacks reveal that when Kal left the Kents, it was Sol who pushed him to seek companionship with humanity when the young Kal wanted to be isolated, and helped him calm his rage when confronted by the tyranny of Peacemakers. Meanwhile, Lois and Jimmy meet Lana Lang, who recognizes them from Smith's attack. She tells them how Superman has been protecting the town in secret for years, and that any friends of Superman are friends of Smallville. When he awakens, Kal thanks Sol for his help and companionship, calling him his brother. Kal formally introduces himself to Jimmy and Lois, who tells him they need to leave before Lazarus comes. Kal sees Ra's is already there, approaching Smallville with an army of tanks and Peacemaker troops.

The townsfolk of Smallville stand against the invading Peacemaker army, as Kal uses all of his sunstone reserves to create barriers to protect the town from Lazarus's heavy artillery. For six weeks, Kal relentlessly defends the citizens by digging tunnels underground and fights off Father Box-enhanced Peace-mechs, all while Lazarus blots out the sun with cloud banks, draining his energy. Lois and Jimmy try to broadcast the truth about Superman and Lazarus's actions in Smallville, but nothing can get through. Brainiac is able to hack into Sol, allowing him to bring down the sunstone barricades, exposing Smallville to the Peacemakers. Ra's approaches the weakened Superman with a large kryptonite broadsword and proclaims that Superman will bow to him as he begs him to be his son. As Ra's repeatedly stabs him, Kal sees visions of his parents on Krypton. Ra's tortures Superman, trying to turn him to his rage. He orders Brainiac to use Sol to kill Kal's friends, but Sol defies him, deleting his own system while saying goodbye to Kal. Ra's further pushes him to submit or die, to which Superman responds that Kal-El of Krypton is already dead as he blasts Ra's with his heat vision. A Peacemaker, Joe, grabs Superman using a Peace-mech, to only angers Ra's, almost killing the man before Superman stops him. Appalled by Superman's altruism, Ra's orders his soldiers kill the people of Smallville. Superman stops him by saying he will do whatever Ra's wants him to do, tearing off his Labor Guild symbol. Ra's tells Superman to get on his knees, but Superman correctly surmises that Ra's will destroy Smallville anyways. Using the dust from the symbol, Superman creates a sunstone sword of his own and battles Ra's. When Ra's tells the Peacemakers to slaughter Smallville, Joe the Peacemaker stops them, telling them that this isn't what they signed up for. In Kal's vision, his parents embrace him and tell him that he is already home on Earth. Superman shatters Ra's sword and defeats him. In a last ditch effort to turn him, Ra's tries to get Superman to kill him to give him what he deserves. Instead, Superman takes him to Pakistan to be put on trial for his crimes.

Weeks later, Smallville is rebuilding from the siege. Lois and Jimmy's broadcast has gotten through, exposing Lazarus's crimes and ruining the company. Ra's is imprisoned and Talia is missing. After healing and rebuilding the sunstone suit, Kal goes tovisit Martha in senior living, but is informed by an orderly that she died peacefully in her sleep the previous night. Kal is devastated, but the orderly tells him that Martha never stopped talking about her son as she gives him a gift Martha made for him. Kal cries as he holds the red and blue costume Martha made, along with a note reading: "From Martha & Jonathan - For our angel, our lost son, Clark Kent".

=== "The Neverending Begins" (#15−17) ===
Sometime later, Kal has taken ownership of the Kent farm, as well as the name Clark Kent. Having changed his armor from grey to blue to match Martha's gift, he works around the globe, stopping disasters, saving people, threatening corrupt business leaders such as Winslow Schott, and even reading poems to an aging Ra's in an effort to reform him. Overwhelmed by the stress, Superman flies into the stratosphere to scream, only to be interrupted by a man with wings who introduces himself as Carter Hall. Hall tells him of other people with superpowers and how many of them met a terrible fate for wanting to change things. Hall wants Superman to work with Lazarus to avoid ending up like them, which Superman rejects. Superman hears trouble and drags Hall with him to Metropolis. There, Hall attacks him to teach him a lesson, but Superman knocks him away. Before they can resume fighting, they are met with an enormous purple monster, Project Parasite, that has absorbed much of the population of Metropolis. After freeing Lois from its grasp, Superman learns he can free the rest by reaching out in hope. Despite Hall's protests, he is able to free everyone and take the Parasite creature back to his farm to heal it. Unbeknownst to him, Talia used the Parasite as a distraction to free Ra's from prison.

Meanwhile, Brainiac cuts ties with Talia and Lazarus before visiting the Luthor household in Missouri. There, he meets with Lex Luthor, a humble father and husband who owns a gas station, and offers him an offer for a project on Superman. To Brainiac's surprise, Lex declines, saying he is happy with his modest life. Brainiac, knowing that Lex is a man of unquenchable ambition in another universe, removes his human disguise and murders Lex's family and friends with chainsaws, forcing Lex to watch in order to "motivate" him before leaving.

=== "Reign of the Supermen" (#18−21) ===
Over 3,000 years ago, while his people are held in slavery to Egypt's Pharaoh, a orphaned boy named Teth-Adam hears a prophecy given by a stranger about a savior will come to overthrow the oppressors and bring about an age of heroes. Teth-Adam decided to become that savior and travels into the desert in search of a fabled wizard. The "wizard" turn out to be two members of Brainiac Collective who experiment on Teth-Adam using a Father Box they discovered.

In the present day, Lois finds the al Ghuls in a condemned Lazarus facility. Talia bring Ra's to the last functioning Lazarus pit to revitalize him, but Ra's, having realized the error of his ways by Superman's kindness, attempts to destroy it. Lois intervenes and tries to kill Talia, but Superman arrives to stop the conflict. Talia incapacitates him using the Father Box, before a masked man with a hammer named John Henry Irons comes to kill Ra's. Meanwhile, the Father Box accidentally awakens Teth-Adam, now wearing a suit similar to Superman's and calling himself King Shazam. Superman is launched across the country by Adam when he tries to calm him down. Ra's explains to Teth-Adam that he was imprisoned for three thousand years after he conquered all of Egypt. He tries to tell them that Superman has brought hope to the world, but Teth-Adam, believing he is lying, kills Ra's. Enraged, Superman flies back and fights Teth-Adam, who sees that the world is still enslaved by its leaders and believes that Superman is a copy of him that the Brainiacs created. Irons joins the fight to help Superman using his homemade flight suit and hammer against Teth-Adam. Their battle sends them skyrocketing across the planet until they crash on a beach, where Hall appears and joins Superman and Irons.

The three have a devastating battle against Teth-Adam that causes disasters across the Earth, though Superman makes sure there are no casualties. Teth-Adam is able to overpower them with his sand cloak. Hall mocks him with the knowledge of the Phantom Stranger's prophecy, how the Brainiacs gave Teth-Adam godly powers using the Father Box, and that the ancient Justice League dethroned him and imprisoned him. Hall tells Teth-Adam that the prophecy was not about him, but Superman. The three heroes break out of Teth-Adam's cloak, but quickly fall apart as they argue over whether they should kill Teth-Adam, with Superman wanting to find another way. Teth-Adam beats them down and leaves them lying bloodied in the Artic. Irons and Hall both give Superman their weapons to take down Teth-Adam. Teth-Adam tries to destroy the Father Box, but Superman sends him flying to the moon, where they resume their battle. Superman tries to get Teth-Adam to stand down, but Teth-Adam refuses to stop, claiming that Teth-Adam is dead and he is Shazam. This accidentally activates Teth-Adam's transformation back into a boy. Superman tries to save him, but Hall arrives and uses the Father Box to seemingly kill Teth-Adam, which upsets Superman deeply.

Lois, after fighting with Talia, chooses to spare her, but Jimmy comes and shoots Talia in the leg in an attempt to kill her. He disappears to reform the Omega Men. Lois gets a job working as a local reporter in Smallville, John Henry goes to Superman's farm, Talia is arrested for her crimes, and Superman throws himself back into helping other across the globe. Meanwhile, Teth-Adam is teleported to a distant planet and vows to return to Earth as Superman's doom.

=== "Get Brainiac" (#22−present) ===
Jimmy and his Omega Men gets a lead that Brainiac is hiding in Argentina. Superman flies there to capture him, but is confronted with a powerful cyborg calling himself Metallo. Superman discovers that Metallo is actually Christopher Smith, revived by Brainiac after being shot by Ra's with the kryptonite bullet, which infused into his bloodstream. While fighting the kryptonite cyborg, Superman tries to makes Smith remember who is he was by recounting how his father was a violent supremacist who disappeared when Smith was eight, how Smith decided to become a Peacemaker and how the experience further broke his psyche, and finally, telling him that his mother died three weeks before. Smith remembers his mother, and regains his memories. As Brainiac leaves, Superman decides to stay and comfort Smith.

== Collected editions ==
=== Hardcovers and trade paperbacks ===
#	Title	Material collected	Format	Pages	Released	ISBN
1	Last Dust of Krypton	Absolute Superman #1–6	HC	176	Aug 19, 2025	978-1799505327
1	Last Dust of Krypton	Absolute Superman #1–6	TPB	176	Aug 19, 2025	978-1799505334
2	Son of the Demon	Absolute Superman #7–14	HC	206	Mar 3, 2026	978-1799507758
2	Son of the Demon	Absolute Superman #7–14	TPB	206	Mar 3, 2026	978-1799507529
3	The Neverending Begins	Absolute Superman #15–21	HC	176	November 3, 2026	978-1799508922
3	The Neverending Begins	Absolute Superman #15–21	TPB	176	November 3, 2026	978-1799508939
4	Get Brainiac	Absolute Superman #22–27	HC	152	May 4, 2027	978-1799516118
4	Get Brainiac	Absolute Superman #22–27	TPB	152	May 4, 2027	978-1799516101

=== Oversized hardcovers ===
#	Title	Material collected	Format	Pages	Released	ISBN
1	Absolute Superman: Deluxe Edition Vol. 1	Absolute Superman #1–14	HC	448	August 12, 2027	978-1799514237
