= The Button (comics) =

DC comic book series

- Cover of Batman #21, art by Jason Fabok.
- Publisher: DC Comics
- Publication date: April – May 2017
Title(s)
- The Flash (vol. 5) #21–22
- Batman (vol. 3) #21–22
(4 issues)
- Main character(s): Batman; Flash

Creative team
- Writer(s): Joshua Williamson and Tom King
- Artist(s): Jason Fabok and Howard Porter

"The Button" is a 2017 comic book crossover created and published by the comic book publishing company DC Comics. The story arc consists of four issues from DC's Batman and Flash publications, functioning in part as a larger buildup towards the "Doomsday Clock" event. The plot was written by Joshua Williamson and Tom King, with art by Jason Fabok and Howard Porter.

In the story, Batman and Flash work together to uncover the truth behind the mysterious button found in the Batcave. As the investigation unfolds, the secrets of the Button bring about the wrath of Professor Zoom as well as the unknown orchestrator of DC Rebirth.

== Synopsis ==
=== Lead-up ===
At the end of the DC Rebirth Special, Wally West was pulled out of the Speed Force by Barry Allen and, in turn, became part of the New 52 universe. Wally believes that it was not the Flashpoint Paradox that caused the New 52 and his imprisonment, but something else. Someone has taken 10 years from the DC Universe, destroying relationships between characters that were established before the New 52. Meanwhile, Batman finds the Comedian's bloody button from Watchmen (embedded in a spot where Wally's Speed Force lightning had struck earlier in the book). The last pages of the book imply that Doctor Manhattan was the one who caused the events of the New 52 reboot by stealing a decade of history following the events of Flashpoint.

In The Flash #9, the interaction between pre-New 52 Wally West and New 52 Wally West triggers a disturbance in the speed force, which causes Barry to have a strange vision. In the vision, Barry sees Eobard Thawne and Jay Garrick's Flash helmet. In The Flash #19, a mysterious blue lightning bolt hits Thawne while he is in Iron Heights Penitentiary, restoring him to his pre-New 52 incarnation with memories of Thomas Wayne killing him during Flashpoint.

=== Main plot ===
The story opens in the Batcave, where Batman has had no success in discovering the mystery behind the button. He carelessly tosses the button next to Psycho-Pirate's mask where a reaction occurs, sending a bolt of lightning into Batman's chest. As he recovers, the Flashpoint incarnation of Thomas Wayne Batman is standing before him, but abruptly fades away as Bruce attempts to reach out to him. Batman notifies Flash, who responds by stating that he will arrive at the Batcave in "one minute". Right as the call ends, Batman hears the sound of thunder that signals Barry's arrival. He, however, turns to find not Barry, but Eobard Thawne, the Reverse Flash. During the course of "one minute", Batman and Reverse Flash engage in a gruesome brawl, where Thawne pummels Batman and destroys Thomas's letter as revenge for Thomas killing him. After knocking Batman out, Thawne picks up the button and is briefly teleported away, returning with his entire body mutilated by an "impending threat" that he describes as "God" before he seemingly dies.

Barry arrives at the destroyed cave to find Bruce's injured body and Thawne's rotting corpse. After discussing the events of the previous issue with a recuperating Batman, Flash heads to the Justice League Watchtower, where he thinks about how he hid a piece of crucial evidence from Bruce: the fact that the radiation on Thawne's corpse matches the radiation on the Button. Barry makes his way through the satellite, as he contemplates using the cosmic treadmill to find out who killed Thawne and is manipulating the reality of their universe. Just as he starts running, Flash is met by Batman who wanted to continue the investigation with Flash. Once the duo enters the time-stream (also known as Hypertime), they are caught in a sort of "Time Storm" where they see moments from the pre-Flashpoint DC Universe. They witness the pre-Crisis origin of the Justice League (originally told in Justice League of America #144 in July 1977) as well as scenes from Identity Crisis and Crisis on Infinite Earths.

After travelling on the Cosmic Treadmill, the Flash and Batman find themselves inside of a different Batcave, and in the presence of Thomas Wayne Batman. Prior to their arrival and after the Flash left to undo the events of Flashpoint, Thomas found that the Flashpoint timeline was not erased yet as the Flash intended, and instead, was forced to live out the remainder of Aquaman and Wonder Woman's war. Left to ponder in the Batcave, Thomas waited for the joint Atlantean and Amazonian hit squad to arrive so he may sacrifice himself and them with explosives until he encounters the Flash and Batman. He believes the two are hallucinations until the Flash briefs him on their situation. The group works together to hold off the Atlantean-Amazonian hit squad as the Flash attempts to fix the Cosmic Treadmill. As soon as the Flash finished the repairs, Batman pleads with Thomas to come with him. Thomas pushes Batman onto the Cosmic Treadmill, imploring the latter to find happiness and be the father to his son that Thomas could never be for him and to let 'the Batman' die with him. As the Flash and Batman disappear into the time-stream, Thomas is satisfied with seeing his son alive and accepts his fate; he hopes that Bruce would move on from the past. He throws his explosive trigger away and puts his cowl back on, reminiscing about the inspiring words he gave to Bruce as a child, and jumping into the white void that is erasing the Flashpoint universe, with his last words being "We rise".

As Batman and Flash travel through the already unraveling time-stream, they are confronted by Reverse-Flash who is somehow alive. Batman notices that Thawne is still holding the button, meaning that this is Thawne right before he dies. He then tries to warn Eobard of his impending death, but Thawne claims he already knows the source of the button's power. He charges ahead, claiming this being has never met anyone like him. The Treadmill begins to break, and Thawne creates a shock wave sending the duo flying through Hypertime. Thawne arrives at the source of the button's energy and confronts the mysterious entity who is responsible for everything. Thawne gloats and boasts of his newfound power saying, "I cannot be erased. By you. By anyone". However, when Thawne sees the being's true face, he is struck with fear and starts pleading for mercy. He is then disintegrated and transported back to the Batcave at the start of the story.

As Batman and Flash get pulled into a vortex, they hear a faint voice calling to them since the beginning of the story. The voice tells them the only way to save them is to say his name: Jay Garrick. And with a bolt of lightning, Jay bursts from the Speed Force taking Barry and Bruce back safely to the Batcave. As Jay's body begins to unravel, he tries to help Barry remember him. Barry grabs Jay's arm, similarly to how he grabbed Wally's during the Rebirth Special, but instead Jay is transported back into the Speed Force in a blast of blue energy. Barry believes that he was not able to bring Jay back because "he wasn't his lightning rod", which is a specific person who acts as a tether to reality for speedsters. The duo visits the graves of Thomas and Martha Wayne to discuss their adventure and how they lost the button as well as having even more unanswered questions than before. Bruce thinks about his father's words and contemplates quitting the Batman persona.

The final pages reveal the button being picked up from off the ground by a familiar glowing blue hand, confirming Doctor Manhattan's introduction into the DC Universe while a familiar quote from Watchmen plays in the background:

Why does my perception of time distress you? Everything is preordained. Even my responses. We're all just puppets, Laurie. I'm just a puppet who can see the strings.

== Titles involved ==
| Title | Issue(s) | Writer(s) | Artist(s) | Notes |
|---|---|---|---|---|
| Batman | #21–22 | Tom King, Joshua Williamson | Jason Fabok | Parts 1 & 3 |
| The Flash | #21–22 | Joshua Williamson | Howard Porter | Parts 2 & 4 |

== Reception ==
Jesse Schedeen from IGN gave Flash #22 a 7.6/10 stating that he found the closure of "The Button" storyline to be a bit underwhelming due to the lack of answers it provided towards the overarching story within the current DC Rebirth arc, but praised the characterization and artwork.

Johns Babos from insidepulse.com gave Flash #22 an 8/10: "Overall a compelling issue that really sets up other events in DC Comics Rebirth...I enjoyed the Flash #22 as well as the Button storyline".

== Collected editions ==
The crossover was collected in a hardcover edition in October 2017:

- Batman/The Flash: The Button Deluxe Edition (collects Batman #21–22, The Flash #21–22, 104 pages, hardcover, October 11, 2017, ISBN 978-1401276447).
