= I Ching (comics) =

- I Ching from Wonder Woman #180, artist Mike Sekowsky.

Publication information
- Publisher: DC Comics
- First appearance: Wonder Woman #179 (November 1968)
- Created by: Denny O'Neil (writer); Mike Sekowsky (artist)

In-story information
- Alter ego: I Ching
- Team affiliations: Justice League of China
- Supporting character of: Wonder Woman; Super-Man
- Abilities: Martial artist Mystic; Living embodiment of yin and yang

I Ching (often spelled I-Ching) is a fictional, blind martial artist published by DC Comics. He first appeared in Wonder Woman #179 (November 1968), and was created by Denny O'Neil and Mike Sekowsky. The character was created to further the editorial plans to reboot Wonder Woman's premise and characters.

== Fictional character biography ==
=== Pre-Crisis ===
I Ching trains Diana Prince in Wonder Woman #179.

I Ching is the last surviving member of an ancient sect, whose monastery was hidden high in the mountains. Their task was to maintain ageless knowledge lost centuries past - a time when men concluded that magic and science are different. Only the sect knew that they are two sides of the same coin. The temple contained several precious gems and metals. Desiring this treasure, Doctor Cyber sent agents to raid the temple. During this attack, all members of the temple were murdered with the sole exception of I Ching, who managed to escape with serious injuries.

I Ching becomes Wonder Woman's mentor after she gives up her powers to remain on Earth rather than accompany the Amazons in traveling to another dimension to restore their magic. Under I Ching's guidance, Diana learns martial arts and weapons skills, and undertook adventures that encompassed a variety of genres, from espionage to mythology. It is also revealed that I Ching has a daughter, Lu Shan.

Wonder Woman's powers and traditional costume were restored in 1973 (issue #204). The issue begins with a lunatic sniper gunning down innocent passersby from his rooftop vantage point. The sniper fires again and mortally wounds I Ching, who dies in Diana's arms.

=== Post-Crisis/"One Year Later" ===
I Ching is resurrected following the Crisis on Infinite Earths continuity reboot, which altered the continuity of the DC universe.I Ching is resurrected, becomes an ally of Batman, and tutors Kong Kenan, the Super-Man of China. He is additionally revealed to have a villainous twin brother named All-Yang, with the two embodying yin and yang.

In DC Rebirth, I-Ching appears in the series New Super-Man as a martial arts instructor in China, whose guidance Kong Kenan, the Super-Man of China, seeks in order to better control his powers. I-Ching introduces Kenan to the Bagua, the eight trigrams that represent the fundamental principals of reality, explaining that each of his powers are organized around it. I-Ching accompanies Kenan on his adventures to provide guidance and develops a close father-son relationship with him. It is later revealed that I-Ching and the villain All-Yang are twin brothers, with All-Yang imprisoning I-Ching in the realm of ghosts. Despite being trapped in the realm of ghosts, I-Ching is able to send his consciousness to the "realm of abstraction" when Kenan calls upon him for help against All-Yang.

I-Ching recounts his and All-Yang's youths during their training at a monastery. Upon discovering that I-Ching and All-Yang were the living embodiments of yin and yang, respectively, their masters instructed each brother to learn a bit of the other's nature to achieve balance. All-Yang refused out of arrogance and abandoned his training, forcing I-Ching to embody both yin and yang. With Kenan's training complete and I-Ching unable to leave the realms of ghosts, I-Ching passes the mantle of yin and yang onto Kenan, who uses his new powers to defeat All-Yang.
