= The Flash (DC Rebirth) =

American superhero comic book series

Publication information
- Publisher: DC Comics
- Schedule: Bimonthly
- Format: Ongoing series
- Genre: Superhero
- Publication date: August 2016 – August 2023
- No. of issues: 145 (#1–88, 750–800, plus Rebirth one-shot, One-Minute War special, and 5 annuals)
- Main character(s): (#1–88, 750–767); Flash (Barry Allen) (#768–800); Flash (Wally West)

Creative team
- Created by: Robert Kanigher; Carmine Infantino
- Written by: Joshua Williamson (#1–88, 750–762, 800); Geoff Johns (#750, 800); Francis Manapul, Brian Buccellato, Marv Wolfman, Scott Lobdell (#750); Kevin Shinick (#763–766); Andy Lanning and Ron Marz (#767); Jeremy Adams (#768–800); Mark Waid, Simon Spurrier (#800)

The Flash (DC Rebirth) is an American superhero comic book written by Joshua Williamson (of Nailbiter and Birthright fame) and published twice-monthly by DC Comics. The title follows the adventure of Barry Allen as the superhero Flash in Central City. The title is part of DC's Rebirth relaunch, following the end of The New 52 initiative established following the Flashpoint storyline in 2011, and started publication in August 2016. In May 2020, the title reverted back to its original numbering with #750, and ceased publication with #800 in August 2023.

== Story arcs ==
=== Lightning Strikes Twice (2016) ===
While investigating a crime scene, Barry Allen has visions of Wally West, Eobard Thawne and an individual in white clothes. While running through Central City, Barry encounters Wally, who had been absorbed into the Speed Force and attempts to warn Barry about the involvement of someone in the timeline. Just as Wally is about to be absorbed into the Speed Force, Barry remembers him and pulls him out. Reuniting, Wally also warns Barry that they "are being watched". After discussing what to do next, Barry goes to visit Batman to talk about the button they found.

While at a crime scene, Barry reunites with his old friend August Heart, who was present on the day he was struck by lightning and gained his powers. Soon, citizens all over Central City gain the powers of the Speed Force seemingly at random.

=== Speed of Darkness (2016–2017) ===
As Barry neglects to train the new Kid Flash (Who coincidentally is also named Wally West), he decides to take matters into his own hands and battle the Shade.

=== Rogues Reloaded (2017) ===
After the supervillain team The Rogues has mysteriously disappeared, Flash goes looking for them. The Rogues enact deadly traps to kill Flash once and for all.

=== Running Scared (2017) ===
Eobard Thawne (aka the Reverse Flash) returns once again to ruin Barry's life and threatens to strike down everyone close to him.

=== Negative (2017) ===
Barry's new powers aren't working properly as he faces a new villain, Bloodwork, who has secret ties to Barry Allen.

=== Cold Day in Hell (2017–2018) ===
Source:

=== Perfect Storm (2018) ===
Source:

=== Flash War (2018) ===
Source:

=== Reckoning of the Forces (2018–2019) ===
Source:

=== Force Quest (2019) ===
Source:

=== The Greatest Trick of All (2019) ===
Source:

=== Year One (2019) ===
Source:

=== Death and The Speed Force (2019) ===
Source:

=== Rogues Reign (2020) ===
Source:

=== The Flash Age (2020) ===
Source:

=== Finish Line (2020) ===
Source:

=== The One-Minute War (2023) ===
The One-Minute War takes place over issues 790 to 796 with one special in between 792 and 793.

An alien force that can harness the Speed Force known as the Fraction invade Earth, arriving with their ship in the middle of Central City and causing everyone on the planet except for the Flash Family to be frozen in time. The destruction caused by their ship took the lives of thousands, including Iris West.

Wally West eventually finds Barry Allen crying over Iris's death before rescuing him. Wallace West and Bart Allen bicker and argue about what to do, before they are saved by Jay Garrick and Jesse Quick from the Fraction. Finding refuge in the West house, the Flash Family briefly grief over the loss of Iris, before trying to come up with a plan to stop the Fraction. Jesse Quick and Max Mercury comment that the Fraction's spire is the same one the two saw while traveling the multiverse during the Dark Crisis. The Fraction plan to collect metahumans and the Flash family for a wedding present for the Empress, and release Miss Murder to take down the family.

The Fraction is revealed to be an alien race who originate from a planet similar to Earth and had an Empress. The Fraction found an energy source (the Speed Force) that could help progress their civilization even further so they created a machine to harness it. After a successful attempt of them harnessing the Speed Force, the Empress wanted more and they started invading planets. The leader of the Fraction agreed to invade Earth as long as he gets to marry the Empress, to which the Empress agrees. As the Fraction invasion continues across the planet, they are faced with other speedsters like Avery Ho and Godspeed. The Fraction even faced Surge, a Jai West from the future that learned to better control his powers.

Wally West convinces Barry Allen to leave Iris' side for a while, and help formulate a plan. The Flash family realize that the Fraction may have artificially accessed the Speed Force and they occupy a huge portion of Central City and Keystone City. Kid Flash and Impulse infiltrate the faction ship and managed to steal a vehicle from them (because Barry Allen wants a car) while also rescuing a person that they were using as a battery along with many other heroes (Superman, Captain Atom), narrowly escaping the grasp of Miss Murder.

== Production ==
=== Background ===
In 2011, DC Comics published the Flashpoint story arc in which Barry Allen travelled back in time in order to prevent his mother Nora Allen's murder. While doing so, he ended up altering the universe, creating one in which Wonder Woman and Aquaman are at war with one another and have decimated Western Europe, among other changes. Following its conclusion, the series radically changed the status quo of the DC Universe, leading to The New 52. DC cancelled all of their titles and debuted 52 new series in September 2011 with new first issues. One of the new 52 series starting in September was the fourth volume of The Flash, starring Barry Allen.

In February 2015, it was announced that following the Convergence storyline in May, DC would be ending its New 52 branding, though the continuity established post-Flashpoint would continue. In February 2016, DC announced another line-wide relaunch of their titles called DC Rebirth. Rebirth was an attempt to restore the DC Universe to a form similar to the one before Flashpoint, while still incorporating elements of The New 52, including its continuity. Due to the relaunch, the New 52 Flash volume ended with #52 in May 2016.

=== Development and writing ===
As part of the DC Rebirth imprint relaunch, The Flash was first announced in March 2016, with Joshua Williamson writing the title. A The Flash: Rebirth one-shot was published in June, with the series starting the same month.

Williamson revealed during a Rebirth livestream that he first approached Dan DiDio about wanting to write The Flash in Summer 2015, telling DiDio that writing The Flash is "really important to [him, and] that there's a story that [he] really [has] to tell". He also revealed that during the first story arc, a Speed Force storm would hit Central City. The storm would strike numerous people and give them super speed, with Barry having to train them. Among the characters to receive powers, Williamson also revealed a new speedster named Godspeed who would act as the main antagonist during the first story arc. To differentiate Godspeed from previous evil speedsters like Eobard Thawne, Williamson made the character more sympathetic and calculating. An element of Barry's character that Williamson wanted to highlight in the title, was his passion for "doing the right thing". During the first arc, the evolution of Wallace West into Kid Flash is also explored.

According to Williamson, neither DiDio nor Geoff Johns mandated any of the Rebirth titles to resemble their film or TV adaptations. During early meeting, Williamson suggest the inclusion of character similar to Harrison Wells from the TV series to be in the comic; the idea was shut down due to not wanting to make the comic similar to the show.

Williamson stated that the Rogues are some of his favorite Flash villains and planned to use them following the conclusion of the first story arc.

== Collected editions ==
#	Title	Material collected	Pages	Publication Date	ISBN
Paperback
1	Lightning Strikes Twice	The Flash: Rebirth #1, The Flash vol. 5 #1–8.	216	January 24, 2017	978-1401267841
2	Speed of Darkness	The Flash vol. 5 #9–13.	128	May 23, 2017	978-1401268930
3	Rogues Reloaded	The Flash vol. 5 #14–20.	168	August 1, 2017	978-1401271572
4	Running Scared	The Flash vol. 5 #23–27.	136	November 21, 2017	978-1401274627
5	Negative	The Flash vol. 5 #28–32.	128	March 27, 2018	978-1401277277
6	Cold Day in Hell	The Flash vol. 5 #34–38, Annual #1.	128	June 19, 2018	978-1401280789
7	Perfect Storm	The Flash vol. 5 #39–45.	184	October 2, 2018	978-1401284527
8	Flash War	The Flash vol. 5 #46–51, a story from Annual #1.	160	December 18, 2018	978-1401283506
9	Reckoning of the Forces	The Flash vol. 5 #52–57.	160	April 2, 2019	978-1401288556
10	Force Quest	The Flash vol. 5 #58–63.	144	September 24, 2019	978-1401291419
11	The Greatest Trick of All	The Flash vol. 5 #66–69, Annual #2.	144	February 11, 2020	978-1779500328
12	Year One	The Flash vol. 5 #70–75.	168	November 19, 2019	978-1401299347
13	Death and the Speed Force	The Flash vol. 5 #76–81.	144	June 9, 2020	978-1779503992
14	Rogues Reign	The Flash vol. 5 #82–87.	152	November 17, 2020	978-1779505774
15	The Flash Age	The Flash vol. 5 #88, #750–755, Annual #3.	216	May 11, 2021	978-1779509239
16	Finish Line	The Flash #756–762.	168	October 12, 2021	978-1779513168
17	Wally West Returns	The Flash #763–771, The Flash Annual 2022 #1.	280	July 26, 2022	978-1779518774
18	Eclipse	The Flash #772–779.	224	December 20, 2022	978-1779517449
19	The Search for Barry Allen	The Flash #780–789.	292	June 27, 2023	978-1779520173
20	One-Minute War	The Flash #790–796, The Flash: One-Minute War Special #1.	244	January 23, 2024	978-1779520883
21	Time Heist	The Flash #797–799, four stories from #800.	128	April 23, 2024	978-1779525017
Deluxe Hardcovers
Batman/The Flash: The Button		The Flash vol. 5 #21–22, Batman vol. 3 #21–22	104	October 17, 2017	978-1401276447
Heroes In Crisis: The Price and Other Stories		The Flash vol. 5 #64–65, Annual #2, Batman vol. 3 #64–65, Green Arrow vol. 6 #45, 48–50	248	October 9, 2019	978-1401299644
The Rebirth Deluxe Edition Book 1		The Flash: Rebirth #1, #1–13	336	August 1, 2017	978-1401271589
The Rebirth Deluxe Edition Book 2		The Flash vol. 5 #14–27	244	May 1, 2018	978-1401278427
The Rebirth Deluxe Edition Book 3		The Flash vol. 5 #28–38, Annual #1, DC Holiday Special 2017 #1	264	October 2, 2018	978-1401281403
The Rebirth Deluxe Edition Book 4		The Flash vol. 5 #28–38	352	Canceled	978-1401289393
Year One		The Flash vol. 5 #70–75.	168	November 13, 2019	978-1401299347
11	The Greatest Trick of All	The Flash vol. 5 #66–69, Annual #2.	144	February 5, 2020	978-1779500328
The Flash #750 Deluxe Edition		The Flash #750 and a story from Showcase #4	128	July 17, 2020	978-1779505071
The Flash by Joshua Williamson Omnibus Vol. 1		The Flash: Rebirth #1, The Flash vol. 5 #1–35, Batman vol. 3 #21–22, Hal Jordan and the Green Lantern Corps #32, Justice League vol. 3 #32–33, and material from DC Holiday Special 2017 #1.	1008	April 9, 2024	978-1779526984
