= Joshua Williamson =

American comic book writer

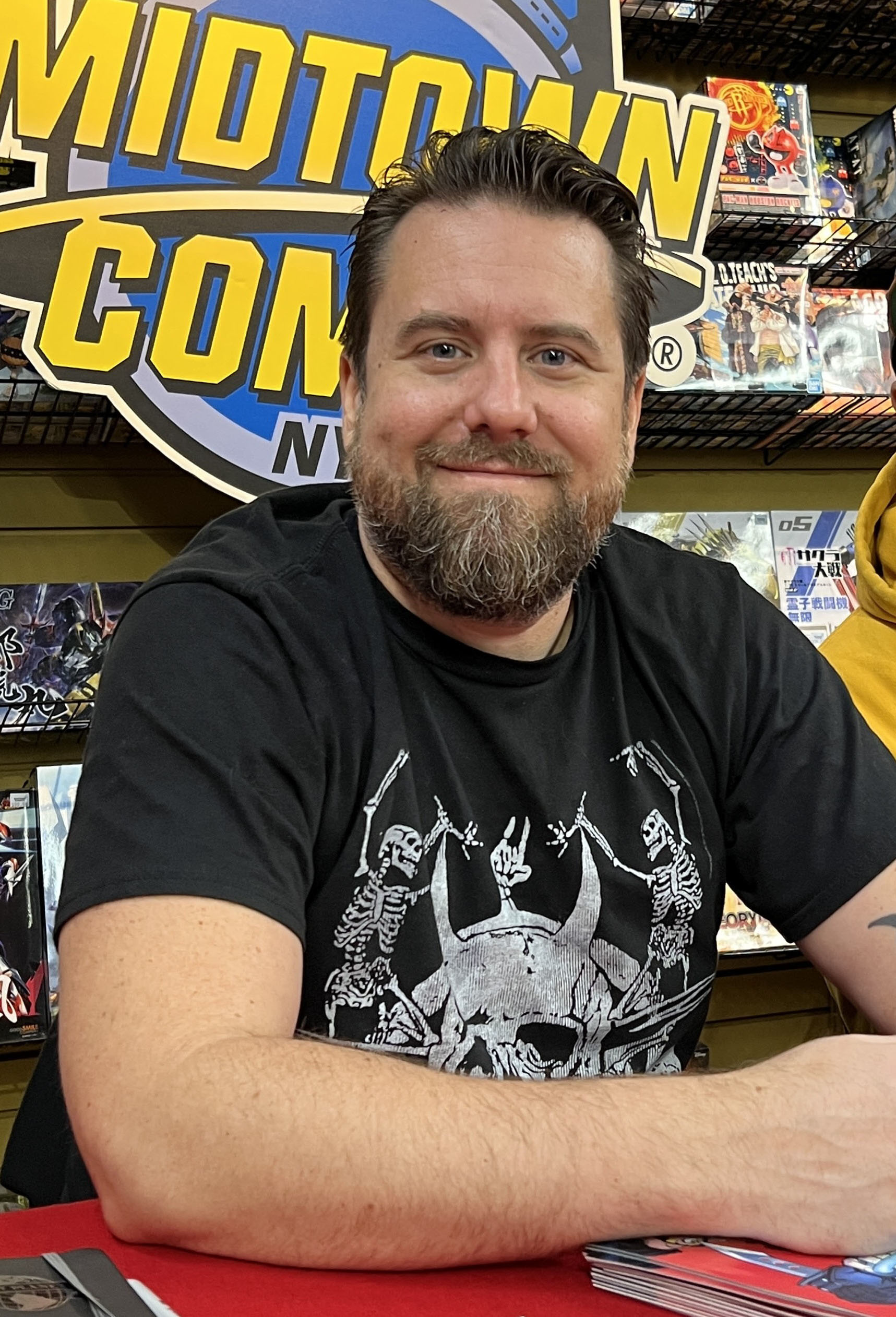
- Williamson at a signing for Energon Universe at Midtown Comics in Manhattan
- Area: Comic book writer
- Notable works: Nailbiter; Birthright; Ghosted; The Flash; Robin; Infinite Frontier; Dark Crisis on Infinite Earths

Joshua Williamson is an American comic book writer. He is known for his long-lasting run on The Flash, as well as DC Comics events, Dark Crisis on Infinite Earths and Knight Terrors. Along with The Flash he has also worked on several other DC Comic characters, such as Robin and Green Arrow. Along with his prolific work in the DC Universe, he has also written several Image Comics titles such as Nailbiter, Birthright, Ghosted and Dark Ride. Williamson has also worked within the Energon Universe, alongside writer Robert Kirkman and writer/artist Daniel Warren Johnson, writing two five-issue mini-series, Duke and Cobra Commander, which serve as prologues to an ongoing G.I. Joe series he writes as well.

As part of his DC work, he co-created the character Godspeed.

Williamson is currently writing Superman and G.I. Joe.

== Career ==
Beginning in 2016 as part of DC Comics' relaunch initiative DC Rebirth, Joshua Williamson was writing the title of The Flash. Before the ongoing series was released The Flash: Rebirth one-shot was published in June, with the series starting the same month. Williamson continued to write the title until September 2020, writing a total of 101 concurrent issues of The Flash with 3 annuals, ending his run on the legacy issue of #762. Williamson returned in 2023 to write a short story in the 800th issue of The Flash.

During 2021, Williamson wrote the titular miniseries in the DC Infinite Frontier initiative. Following Infinite Frontier, Williamson wrote a sequel series, Justice League Incarnate, alongside Denis Culver. This 5 issue title followed the team Justice Incarnate, picking up from not only Infinite Frontier, but using plot-points and elements from Grant Morrison's Multiversity.

As a part of Infinite Frontier, Williamson began a new volume of Robin following Damian Wayne along with Deathstroke Inc. Following James Tynion IV's departure from Batman, Williamson took over on #118 joined by artist Jorge Molina. His tenure on Batman was short lived but lead to the crossover event, between the three ongoing-series Williamson worked on at the time, titled Shadow War.

Williamson took over the ongoing Justice League title from Brian Micheal Bendis, for one-issue with Rafa Sandoval. It was announced that issue 75 would be the final issue of the volume, with the story being titled, The Death of the Justice League. #75 was released in April 2022, on the 30th anniversary of The Death of Superman, which took place in Superman #75. Williamson stated that "We want people to understand, this is serious and this is gonna have a major impact in the DCU moving forward." And ". . . how this is the last issue of Justice League. But then three months later, there's still not gonna be a Justice League comic. It's gonna be a while, and that's gonna be a major part of what the DCU looks like after this story: There is no Justice League."

In February 2022, DC announced Dark Crisis. The 7 issue event series written by Williamson with art by Daniel Sampere. Dark Crisis was a continuation and a finale to the story he was building from the start of Infinite Frontier. At 2022 San Diego Comic-Con, the full title of the event was revealed to be Dark Crisis on Infinite Earths, to signify how it was a direct sequel to the 1985 event, Crisis on Infinite Earths.

At New York Comic Con 2022, Williamson was announced to be the new writer on the new volume of Superman, where he would be joined by artist Jamal Campbell. This new run of Superman would help launch DC's new 2023 publishing initiative, Dawn of DC. In October 2023, the landmark 850th issue of Superman was written by Williamson as a part of his run.

Part of Dawn of DC, Williamson announced that he would be writing a Green Arrow 6 issue mini-series joined by artist Sean Izaakse in April 2023. Due to high-sales with the launch of Green Arrow, DC announced that Green Arrow would be extended to become a 12-issue max-series. In December 2023, it was officially announced that Green Arrow had again been promoted to an ongoing series.

In June 2024, Williamson announced in his online newsletter that he would be leaving both Batman & Robin and Green Arrow with issue #13 and #17/350 respectively, in order to free up his busy schedule, allowing him to write more series. Later the same month it was announced, again in his newsletter, that Williamson and artist Tom Reilly would be working together on the G.I. Joe ongoing series set in the Energon Universe, following his work on Duke and Cobra Commander.

In July 2024, Williamson along with Scott Snyder announced the new DC publishing initiative, DC All In, for which they plotted and wrote an overarching meta-story. Unlike DC's previous publishing initiatives, like The New 52 and DC Rebirth, DC All In is meant to both honor legacy as well as the new. Creating new jumping on points both in the main DC universe, and another alternate universe, the Absolute Universe. With All In, Williamson was leaving Green Arrow with the 350th milestone issue along with the 2024 annual. Though Williamson stated that he would still be continuing Superman with new series artist Dan Mora.

In October 2025, during New York Comic Con, it was announced that Williamson would be writing a new volume of Legion of Super-Heroes beginning in March 2026. It was later announced that Williamson would return to Marvel Comics for the first time in over a decade to write the next volume of Iron Man beginning in January 2026.

== Bibliography ==
=== DC Comics ===
- The Flash:
  - The Flash vol 5. #1–88, 750–762, 800 (with, Carmine Di Giandomenico, Howard Porter, cont, June 2016–September 2020)
    - Collected in Trade Paperbacks as.
      - The Flash Vol 1. Lightning Strikes Twice (collects The Flash: Rebirth one-shot and #1–8, 216 pages, 2017)
      - The Flash Vol 2. Speed of Darkness (collects #9–13, 128 pages, 2017)
      - The Flash Vol 3. Rogues Reloaded (collects #14–20, 168 pages, 2017)
      - Batman/The Flash: The Button (includes #21–22; hc, 104 pages, 2017; tpb, 2019,) Co-written by Tom King
      - The Flash Vol 4. Running Scared (collects #23–27, 136 pages, 2017)
      - The Flash Vol 5. Negative (collects #28–32, 128 pages, 2018)
      - The Flash Vol 6. Cold Day in Hell (collects #34–38 and Annual #1, 128 pages, 2018)
      - The Flash Vol 7. Perfect Storm (collects #39–45, 184 pages, 2018)
      - The Flash Vol 8. Flash War (collects #46–51 and a story from Annual #1, 160 pages, 2018)
      - The Flash Vol 9. Reckoning of the Forces (collects #52–57, 160 pages, 2019)
      - The Flash Vol 10. Force Quest (collects #58–63, 144 pages, 2019)
      - The Flash Vol 11. The Greatest Trick of All (collects #66–69 and Annual #2, 144 pages, 2020)
      - The Flash: Year One (collects #70–75, 168 pages, 2019)
      - The Flash Vol 12. Death and the Speed Force (collects #76–81, 144 pages, 2020)
      - The Flash Vol 13. Rogues Reign (collects #82–87, 152 pages 2020)
      - The Flash Vol 14. The Flash Age (collects #88, #750–755 and Annual #3, 216 pages, 2021)
      - The Flash Vol 15. Finish Line (collects #756–762, 168 pages, 2021)
      - The Flash Vol 20. Time Heights (collects #797–800, 128 pages, 2024). Williamson only wrote a story from #800.
    - Collected in Oversized Hardcovers as.
      - The Flash: The Rebirth Deluxe Edition – Book 1 (collects The Flash: Rebirth #1 and #1–13; 336 pages, August 2017)
      - The Flash: The Rebirth Deluxe Edition – Book 2 (collects #14–27; 244 pages, May 2018)
      - The Flash: The Rebirth Deluxe Edition – Book 3 (collects #28–38, Annual #1, DC Holiday Special 2017 #1; 264 pages, October 2018)
      - The Flash by Joshua Williamson Omnibus Vol. 1 (collects The Flash: Rebirth #1, The Flash vol. 5 #1–35, Batman vol. 3 #21–22, Hal Jordan and the Green Lantern Corps #32, Justice League vol. 3 #32–33, and material from DC Holiday Special 2017 #1; 1008 pages, April 2024)
- Justice League vs Suicide Squad #1-6 (with Jason Fabok, Tony Daniels and Howard Porter, December 2017 – January 2017). Collected as.
  - Justice League vs Suicide Squad (collects #1-6, Suicide Squad #8-10 and Justice League #12-13, 336 pages; hc, June 2017; tpb, December 2017)
- Deathbed #1-6 (with Riley Rossmo, February - July 2018). Originally published under DC Vertigo, Reprinted under DC Black Label in 2023. Collected as.
  - Deathbed (collects #1-6, 152 pages; tpb, October 2018).
- Batman / Superman Vol. 2 #1–15 (with David Marques, Clayton Henry, Nick Derrington, August 2019-December 2020)
  - Batman / Superman Vol. 1: Who Are The Secret Six (collects #1-6, 160 pages; hc, March 2020; tpb, November 2020)
  - Batman / Superman Vol. 2: World's Deadliest (collects #7-15, 272 pages; hc, April 2021; tpb, November 2021)
- Future State
  - Future State: Justice League #1–2 (with Robson Rocha, January – February 2021) Collected in
    - Future State: Justice League (296 pages; tpb, June 2021)
  - Future State: Dark Detective, #2,4 (with Giannis Milonogiannis, January – February 2021) Collected in.
    - Future State: Gotham Volume 1 (224 pages, tpb, April 2022)
  - Future State: Gotham #1–6 (co-written with Denis Culver with art by Giannis Milonogiannis, May 2021, October 2021) Collected as.
    - Future State: Gotham Volume 1 (collects #1–7, 224 pages, tpb, April 2022)
- Infinite Frontier #0–7 (with Xermanico, March – September 2021). Collected as.
  - Infinite Frontier (collects #0–7 & Infinite Frontier: Secret Files #1, 352 pages; hc, 2022; tp, 2023)
- Batman & Robin:
  - Robin Vol. 3 #1–17 (with Gleb Melnikov, Roger Cruz, April 2021–August 2022). Collected As.
    - Robin Volume 1: The Lazarus Tournament (collects #1–6 and stories from Detective Comics #1034 and Batman Vol 3. #106, 184 pages; tpb, April 2022)
    - Robin Volume 2: I Am Robin (collects #7–12 and annual #1, 208 pages; tpb, September 2022)
    - Robin Volume 3: Secrets and Shadows (collects #13–17, 136 pages; tpb, March 2023
  - Batman Vol 3: #118–124 (with Jorge Molina, Mikel Jainin and Howard Porter, December 2021–June 2021). Collected as.
    - Batman Volume 6: Abyss (collects #118–121 & 124, 176 pages; hc, August 2022; tpb, January 2024)
    - Batman: Shadow War (collects #122–123, Robin Vol 3. #13–14, Deathstroke Inc. #8–9, Shadow War: Alpha #1, Shadow War: Omega #1, Shadow War Zone #1, 304 pages; hc, November 2022).
  - Batman: One Bad Day - Bane #1 (with Howard Porter, January 2023). Collected as.
    - Batman: One Bad Day - Bane (88 pages; hc, August 2023).
  - Batman & Robin Vol 3. #1–13 (with Simone De Meo, Nikola Cizmesja and Juan Ferreyra, September 2023-September 2024). Collected as.
    - Batman and Robin Vol. 1: Father and Son (collects #1–6, 208 pages; tpb, August 2024)
    - Batman and Robin Vol. 2: (collects #7–13, 160 pages; tpb, February 2025)
- Deathstroke Inc. #1–9 (with Howard Porter and Paolo Pantalena, September 2021 – May 2022). Collected as.
  - Deathstroke Inc. Volume One: King of the Super-Villains (collects #1–7, 208 pages; hc, August 2022; tpb, July 2023)
- Justice League Incarnate #1–5 (co-written with Denis Culver with Andrei Bressen, Brandon Peterson and more, November 2021–March 2022). Collected as.
  - Justice League Incarnated (collects #1–5, 176 pages; hc, 2022)
- Dark Crisis #0–7 (with Daniel Sampere and Alejandro Sanchez, June – December 2022). Collected as.
  - Dark Crisis on Infinite Earths (collects #0-7 and Justice League #75; 290 pages; hc, June 2023; tpb, May 2024)
- Knight Terrors (July – August 2024).
  - Knight Terrors Omnibus (collects Knight Terrors 2023 FCBD Special Edition #1; Knight Terrors: First Blood #1; Knight Terrors: Night's End #1; Knight Terrors #1-4; Knight Terrors: Action Comics #1-2; Knight Terrors: Batman #1-2; Knight Terrors: Black Adam #1-2; Knight Terrors: Catwoman #1-2; Knight Terrors: Detective Comics #1-2; Knight Terrors: Green Lantern #1-2; Knight Terrors: Harley Quinn #1-2; Knight Terrors: Nightwing #1-2; Knight Terrors: Poison Ivy #1-2; Knight Terrors: Robin #1-2; Knight Terrors: Shazam! #1-2; Knight Terrors: Superman #1-2; Knight Terrors: The Flash #1-2; Knight Terrors: The Joker #1-2; Knight Terrors: Titans #1-2; Knight Terrors: Wonder Woman #1-2; Knight Terrors: Ravager #1-2; Knight Terrors: Zatanna #1-2; Knight Terrors: Punchline #1-2; Knight Terrors: Angel Breaker #1-2, 1464 pages; ohc, May 2025)
    - Knight Terrors #1-4 (with Giuseppe Camuncoli and Caspar Wijngaard, July – August 2024). Collected as
      - Knight Terrors (collects #1-4, Knight Terrors: First Blood #1 & Knight Terrors: Knights End #1, 232 pages, hc, February 2024)
    - Knight Terrors: Superman #1-2 (with Tom Reilly, July – August 2024). Collected in.
      - Knight Terrors: Knightmare League (368 pages; hc, February 2024)
    - Knight Terrors: Batman #1-2 (with Guillem March, July – August 2024). Collected in.
      - Knight Terrors: Knightmare League (368 pages; hc, February 2024)
- Superman:
  - Superman Vol. 6 #1– (with Jamal Campbell, Gleb Melkinov, Dan Mora and more, February 2023 – Present). Collected as.
    - Superman Vol 1: Supercorp (collects #1–5 & 2023 annual, 184 pages; hc, 2023; tpb, Nov. 2024)
    - Superman Vol 2: The Chained (collects #6–12, 176 pages; tpb, May 2024)
    - Superman: The House of Brainiac (collects #13-15, Action Comics #1064-1066 & Superman: House of Brainiac Special, 240 pages; tpb, 2024)
    - Superman Vol 3: Justice Reborn (collects #16–21, 168 pages; tpb, Dec 2024)
    - Superman Vol. 4: Rise of the Superwoman (collects #19-23 and Superwoman Special #1, 176 pages, July 2025)
    - Superman Vol. 5: Love and Mercy (collects #24-27 and Lex Luthor Special #1, 152 pages, December 2025)
    - Superman Vol. 7: Reign of the Superboys (collects #36-40, 144 pages, January 2027)
  - Action Comics Vol. 1 #1050, 1064–1066 (with Rafa Sandoval & Miguel Mendonca, April–June 2024). Collected in
    - Superman: Kal-el Returns (collects Action Comics #1048-1050, 240 pages, tpb, 2023)
    - Superman: The House of Brainiac (collects #13–15, Action Comics #1064–1066 & Superman: House of Brainiac Special, 240 pages; tpb, 2024)
- Green Arrow Vol 7. #1–16, 350 (with Sean Izaakse, Phill Hester and Amancay Nahuelpen, April 2023 – October 2024). Collected as.
  - Green Arrow Volume 1: Reunion (collects #1–6, 144 pages, tpb, March 2024)
  - Green Arrow Volume 2: Family First (collects #7–12, 176 pages, tpb, September 2024)
  - Green Arrow Volume 3: (collects #13-16, #350 and Green Arrow 2024 Annual #1, tpb, March 2025)
- The Dark Knight Rises Prologue (DC Comics, Warner Home Video, 2012)
- Craftsman Bolt-On System Saves the Justice League (2012)
- Justice League: Knight Vision Special #1 (with Mark Waid, 2026).
- DC K.O.:
  - Justice League: The Omega Act #1
  - DC K.O. #1–5 (with Scott Snyder, 2025-2026).
  - DC K.O.: Knightfight #1–4

=== Image Comics ===
- Nailbiter:
  - Nailbiter #1–30 (with Mike Henderson, May 2014 – March 2017).
    - Collected In Trade Paperbacks
      - Nailbiter Volume 1: There Will Be Blood (collects #1–5, October 2014, ISBN 1-63215-112-X)
      - Nailbiter Volume 2: Bloody Hands (collects #6–10, March 2015, ISBN 1-63215-232-0)
      - Nailbiter Volume 3: Blood in the Water (collects #11–15, September 2015, ISBN 1-63215-485-4)
      - Nailbiter Volume 4: Blood Lust (collects #16–20, April 2016, ISBN 1-63215-682-2)
      - Nailbiter Volume 5: Bound in Blood (collects #21–25 and the Nailbiter/Hack/Slash, November 2016, ISBN 1-63215-892-2)
      - Nailbiter Volume 6: The Bloody Truth (collects #26–30, May 2017, ISBN 1-53430-155-0)
      - Nailbiter Compendium One (collects #1–30 and Nailbiter/Hack/Slash, September 2023)
    - Collected in Oversized Hardcovers
      - Nailbiter: The Murder Edition Volume 1 (collects #1–10, July 2016, ISBN 1-63215-475-7)
      - Nailbiter: The Murder Edition Volume 2 (collects #11–20, March 2018, ISBN 1-53430-754-0)
      - Nailbiter: The Murder Edition Volume 3 (collects #21–30, May 2019, ISBN 1-53431-206-4)
  - Nailbiter Returns #1–10 (with Mike Henderson, June 2020 – February 2021). Collected as
    - Nailbiter Volume 7: Nailbiter Returns (collects #1–5, October 2020, ISBN 1-53431-690-6
    - Nailbiter Volume 8: Horror in the Sun (collects #6–10, March 2021, ISBN 1-53431-865-8)

==== Skybound ====
- Ghosted #1–20 (with Goran Sudžuka, July 2013 – May 2015). Collected as
  - Ghosted Volume 1: Haunted Heist (collects #1–5, December 2013, tpb)
  - Ghosted Volume 2: Books of the Dead (collects #6–10, June 2014, tpb)
  - Ghosted Volume 3: Death Wish (collects #11–15, December 2014, tpb)
  - Ghosted Volume 4: Ghost Town (collects ##16–20, June 2015, tpb)
  - Ghosted Compendium (collects #1–20, September 2023, tpb)
- Birthright #1–50 (with Andrei Bressen, October 2014 – June 2021).
  - Birthright Volume 1: Homecoming (collects #1–5, March 2015
  - Birthright Volume 2: Call to Adventure (collects #6–10, September 2015, tpb)
  - Birthright Volume 3: Allies and Enemies (collects #11–15, May 2016, tpb)
  - Birthright Volume 4: Family History (collects #16–20, December 2016, tpb)
  - Birthright Volume 5: Belly of the Beast (collects #21–25, July 2017, tpb)
  - Birthright Volume 6: Fatherhood (collects #26–30, April 2018, tpb)
  - Birthright Volume 7: Blood Brothers (collects #31–35, February 2019, tpb)
  - Birthright Volume 8: Live by the Sword (collects #36–40, December 2019, tpb)
  - Birthright Volume 9: War of the Worlds (collects #41–45, August 2020, tpb)
  - Birthright Volume 10: Epilogue (collects #46–50, August 2021, tpb)
  - Birthright Book One (collects #1–25, October 2024, ohc)
- Evolution #1–18 (co-written with James Asmus, Joseph Keatinge, Christopher Sebela, with art by Joe Infurnari & Jordan Boyd, November 2017 – September 2019)
  - Evolution Volume 1: Origins of Species (collects #1–6, May 2018, tpb)
  - Evolution Volume 2: Adapt & Die (collects #7–12, December 2018, tpb)
  - Evolution Volume 3: Extinction (collects #13–18, October 2019, tpb)
- Dark Ride #1–12 (with Andrei Bressen, October 2022 – May 2024). Collected as
  - Dark Ride Volume 1: Hell Ticket (collects #1–4, March 2023)
  - Dark Ride Volume 2: Family Horror (collects #5–8, October 2023)
  - Dark Ride Volume 3: Devil's Due (collects #9–12, June 2024)

==== Energon Universe ====
- Duke #1–5 (with Tom Reilly and Jordie Bellaire, December 2023 – April 2024). Collected as.
  - Duke, Volume 1: Knowing is Half the Battle (collects #1–5 and a story from the Energon Universe 2024 Special, tpb, June 2024).
- Cobra Commander #1–5 (with Andrea Milana and Annalisa Leoni, January 2024 – May 2024). Collected as.
  - Cobra Commander, Volume 1: Determined to Rule the World (collects #1–5, tpb, June 2024).
- G.I. Joe #1–Present (with Tom Reilly and Jordie Bellaire, October 2024 –)
  - G.I. Joe Vol. 1: The Cobra Strikes! (collects #1-6, tpb, June 2025)
  - G.I. Joe Vol. 2: Bludd's Revenge (collects #7-12, tpb, November 2025)
  - G.I. Joe Vol. 3: Dreadnok War (collects #13-18, tpb, April 2026)
  - G.I. Joe Vol. 4: The Hunt for Energon (collects #19-24, tpb, September 2026)

=== Dark Horse Comics ===
- Captain Midnight #0-24 (with Fernando Dagnino, Eduardo Francisco and Manuel Garcia, June 2013 - June 2015). Collected as
  - Captain Midnight Volume 1: On the Run (collects #0-3, tpb, February 2014)
  - Captain Midnight Volume 2: Brave Old World (collects #4-7, tpb, May 2014)
  - Captain Midnight Volume 3: Better Tomorrow (collects #8-11, tpb, September 2014)
  - Captain Midnight Volume 4: Crash and Burn (collects #12-15, tpb, January 2015)
  - Captain Midnight Volume 5: Lost Time (collects #16-19, tpb, June 2015)
  - Captain Midnight Volume 6: Marked For Death - Reign of the Archon (collects #20-24, tpb, October 2015)

=== Marvel Comics ===
- Iron Man Vol 8. #1– (with Carmen Carnero, Jan Bazaldua and more, January 2026 – Present).
  - Iron Man Vol. 1: A New Nightmare (collects #1–6, 152 pages, tpb, October 2026)
  - Iron Man Vol. 2: (collects #7-11, ???? pages, tpb, ????)
