= Shadow War (DC Comics) =

Comic book storyline

- Publisher: DC Comics
- Publication date: March – May 2022
- Genre: Superhero
Title(s)
Shaddow War Alpha #1, Batman #122-123, Robin #13-14, Deathstroke Inc. #8-9
- Main character(s): Batman; Damian Wayne; Deathstroke; Ra's al Ghul; Black Canary; Talia al Ghul; League of Assassins

Creative team
- Writer: Joshua Williamson
- Artist(s): Viktor Bogdanovic, Howard Porter, Paolo Pantalena, Roger Cruz, Mike Henderson
- Letterer(s): Troy Peteri, Clayton Cowles, Steve Wands,
- Colorist(s): Mike Spicer, Tomeu Morey, Romulo Fajardo Jr., Luis Guerrero, Hi-Fi
- Editor: Ben Abernathy

"Shadow War" is a nine-issue crossover comic book storyline published by the comic book publishing company DC Comics featuring Batman, Deathstroke, and Damian Wayne as Batman and Robin try to stop Deathstroke from committing an unthinkable act against the League of Assassins, Talia al Ghul, and Ra's al Ghul. The event overall received positive reviews, with critics praising the writing, art, and action.

== Publication history ==
In December 2021, DC Comics announced "Shadow War" as Joshua Williamson temporarily became the new writer for Batman while DC Comics searched for a more permanent Batman writer. In the storyline, Deathstroke has committed a crime against the League of Shadows, while Batman and Robin must track down Deathstroke and bring him to justice.

== Plot summary ==
=== Prelude ===
After Bane killed Alfred Pennyworth, Damian Wayne left Gotham City over his guilt and PTSD to participate in underground fighting tournaments. Damian finds out there are assassins trying to kill his mother Talia al Ghul and defeats them all. Robin is trying to participate in the League of Lazarus Tournament where he meets Connor Hawke, Ravager, and new fighters like Flatline, and Respawn. Damian Wayne meets up with his grandfather Ra's al Ghul and after a personal talk with Ra's al Ghul as well as Dick Grayson, Damian Wayne regains his motivation where he fights off the leader of the League of Lazarus Tournament, who is revealed to be Ra's al Ghul's mother Ruh al Ghul. Damian realizes that the tournament allows every fighters 3 lives and every time they get revived, the Lazarus Demon starts to wake up. Damian Wayne rushes back to the tournament where Connor Hawke is his last opponent after Connor defeats Ravager.

Connor Hawke defeats Damian Wayne the second time, but is stabbed in the chest by the Lazarus Demon. Damian Wayne gets knocked out where he has a conversation with the hallucination of Alfred, where he realizes that the first step for Bruce Wayne to become Batman was asking for help. Damian Wayne rallies the fighters in the League of Lazarus tournament and they manage to defeat the Lazarus Demon. Ruh al Ghul makes Damian unconscious and sends him into the past, where Damian learns Ra's al Ghul created the Lazarus Pits to revive his mother and Ruh al Ghul had visions that the Lazarus Demon would awaken and burn the Earth. In order to stop the demon, Ra's al Ghul must destroy the Earth and recreate it. Ra's al Ghul refuses and this conflict caused a civil war. Ra's al Ghul defeats his mother, but spares her and instead bounds her to the Lazarus Demon. Damian manages to break free, but just then Ra's al Ghul and his troops arrive.

Damian Wayne convinces Ra's al Ghul to spare his mother and Respawn reveals his identity to Ravager before running off to find Deathstroke. After Damian and his friends round up the rest of the enemy, he kisses Flatline and decides to go back to Gotham City to revive Alfred. Still reeling from the effects of Ruh al Ghul, Damian fights a hallucination of himself before Talia al Ghul calms him down. Damian explains he can not revive Alfred because Alfred will not be the same. Damian agrees to live with Talia al Ghul, Ra's al Ghul is revealed to be dying, and Flatline is working for Lord Death Man.

Deathstroke has been working with Black Canary for an organization called TRUST. Black Canary and Deathstroke spar but offer a truce. Juliette (the leader of TRUST) and Prometheus sends them to a different dimension. Both of them break free of the dimension, and Juliette offers them a seat at their Council to fight an upcoming darkness. Deathstroke kills several members and announces he will be the leader of the TRUST council. Black Canary manages to escape the council and go back to the Justice League for reinforcements. Deathstroke announces that he will be the leader of the Secret Society and just then Ravager and Respawn arrive. Deathstroke finds Respawn and Ravager intruding and Respawn reveals that he is the clone of Damian who was created by Ra's Al Ghul. Ra's al Ghul injected Respawn with Deathstroke's serum to get a healing factor and used Respawn as a harvest organ donor in case Damian gets hurt and needs replacement organs. Deathstroke empathizes with Respawn and announces he will destroy anyone who gets in his way. He will also build reinforcements to deal with a dark crisis. Respawn takes out Ravager and Deathstroke announces they will prepare against the League of Shadows. Batman returns to Gotham City to deal with the Arkham Tower incident, and Deathstroke announces they need to distract Batman.

=== Main plot ===
Ra's al Ghul goes to Markovian Embassy in Washington, D.C. to announce that he will allow the world to have access to the Lazarus Pits. While tailing Ra's al Ghul, Batman awkwardly meets up with Damian Wayne. During a press conference, Ra's al Ghul is shot by someone in a Deathstroke outfit who starts shooting at innocent bystanders including Talia al Ghul. The Deathstroke imposter detonates a grenade near Ra's al Ghul's body with Batman preventing Damian Wayne from getting in the explosion. Damian Wayne announces that he will find Deathstroke, dead or alive after Batman accidentally insults him for not saving Alfred. Talia al Ghul survives her wounds and calls out to the rest of the League of Shadows to attack Deathstroke and kill anyone who tries to associate or protect him. Meanwhile, in Zandia, Deadline confronts Deathstroke about the assassination, who later realized that he was framed until the League of Shadows, led by Angel Breaker, attacked the headquarters.

Batman and Cameron Chase investigate the shooting and Batman deduce that Deathstroke only wanted to kill Ra's al Ghul. Deathstroke and his son fend off the League of Shadows and escape while Damian Wayne meets up with Rose Wilson to take down Deathstroke. Batman visits Talia al Ghul and confronts her if she orchestrated Ra's al Ghul's murder. Talia al Ghul denies the assassination attempt and later revealed that she has not used the Lazarus Pit to heal her injuries. Batman comforts Talia as she pulls him into a kiss.

Batman rejects Talia’s kiss, attempting to explain he is still in love with his ex-fiancée Selina Kyle. Talia al Ghul explains Ra's al Ghul wants to share the Lazarus Pits with the world because of Damian Wayne. Batman leaves to find Damian after Talia informs him that she sends assassins to kill Deathstroke, while Deathstroke and Respawn go to a secret hideout, where he spies on the Titans, to plan their next move. While bonding with Respawn, both of them are confronted by Damian and Rose. During the fight, Respawn reveals his identity to Damian Wayne as his brother (created by his grandfather) and Batman arrives to take in Deathstroke. While Batman confronts Deathstroke to turn him in, Angel Breaker threatens Deathstroke and Merlyn kills his partner Doctor Moon after revealing his alliance with the Secret Society to the League of Shadows. Before fleeing the scene with his children, Deathstroke throws a grenade at innocent civilians to distract Damian and Batman. Both of them reconcile and makeup after they learned that Deathstroke is innocent. Batman plans to use his own Batman Incorporated to protect Deathstroke's assassins from Talia's assassins.

Batman and Robin interrogate a prisoner in Arkham Asylum, who tells them that in the past, the Royal Flush Gang hired him to pose as a fake Deathstroke. One of them happens to be the same person who shot Ra's al Ghul. The prisoner also revealed that they received Deathstroke's costume from their tailor Paul Gambi, located in Central City. As they arrive in Central City, they found Gambi heavily tranquilized. Batman Incorporated helps Deathstroke Assassins. While investigating in Central City, Batman and Robin are approached by the Deathstroke impersonator, who informs them that Slade must be punished. Deathstroke deduces who shot Ra's al Ghul. However, they are ambushed by ninjas and Respawn is mortally wounded, enraging Slade.

Deathstroke and Ravager mourn Respawn's death and they go free his assassins. The Deathstroke imposter escape causes the hideout to collapse forcing Batman and Damian to escape with the unconscious Gambi. Deathstroke and Ghostmaker fight with Ghostmaker. They let Deathstroke go after Deathstroke threatens to kill Clownhunter. Talia al Ghul puts her grandmother back on Lazarus Island. Batman and Damian arrive to where Talia al Ghul and Deathstroke are fighting each other, where Ravager tells Damian that Talia al Ghul murdered Respawn. Talia kills Deathstroke. The Deathstroke imposter reveals himself to be Geo-Force. His motivation was Deathstroke hurting his family and Ra's al Ghul hurting his country. Geo-Force causes an earthquake.

Geo-Force reveals that he killed Ra's al Ghul because of his responsibility for Markovia's destruction after Leviathan's defeat, which left Geo-force despondent and vengeful as a result. He also framed Deathstroke to take the opportunity to exact revenge on Ra's al Ghul's family. He waited for Talia to finish Deathstroke. Geo-force creates a Kaiju version of himself, as he plans to destroy the League of Shadows. Robin, Batman, Black Canary, and Talia al Ghul manage to defeat Geo-Force, and Robin convinces Talia al Ghul to spare Geo-Force because Ra's Al Ghul believed his family can be better. With Angel Breaker and other members of the League of Shadows having retreated, Doctor Chase sends Geo-Force to Belle Reve for his crimes. Deathstroke's body is taken by the Secret Society of Super Villains to be resurrected by the Lazarus Pits. Deathstroke is resurrected and vows to kill everyone. Talia al Ghul turns herself in and Robin and Batman reconcile their relationship. They go out in the night to stop Killer Moth and Firefly.

== Issues and reading order ==
Title	Issue	Publication date
Shadow War: Alpha	#1	March 29, 2022
Batman	#122	April 5, 2022
Deathstroke Inc.	#8	April 26, 2022
Robin	#13	April 26, 2022
Batman	#123	May 3, 2022
Shadow War Zone	#1	May 17, 2022
Deathstroke Inc.	#9	May 24, 2022
Robin	#14	May 24, 2022
Shadow War: Omega	#1	May 31, 2022

== Collected edition ==
Title	Material collected	Published date	ISBN
Batman: Shadow War	Batman #122-123, Robin #13-14, Deathstroke Inc. #8-9, Shadow War: Alpha #1, Shadow War: Omega #1, Shadow War Zone #1	November 2022	978-1779517975

== Critical reception ==
The main event has received positive reviews. According to Comic Book Roundup, the main event received an average score of 7.5 out of 10 based on 129 reviews.

According to Comic Book Roundup, Shadow War: Alpha #1 received an average score of 8.4 out of 10 based on 20 reviews.

According to Comic Book Roundup, Batman #122 received an average score of 7.9 out of 10 based on 17 reviews.

According to Comic Book Roundup, Deathstroke Inc. #8 received an average score of 7.1 out of 10 based on 9 reviews.

According to Comic Book Roundup, Robin #13 received an average score of 8 out of 10 based on 10 reviews.

According to Comic Book Roundup, Batman #123 received an average score of 7.2 out of 10 based on 13 reviews.

According to Comic Book Roundup, Deathstroke Inc. #9 received an average score of 7.1 out of 10 based on 9 reviews.

According to Comic Book Roundup, Robin #14 received an average score of 7.7 out of 10 based on 12 reviews.

According to Comic Book Roundup, Shadow War: Omega received an average rating of 7.3 out of 10 based on 13 reviews.
