= Batgirl and the Birds of Prey =

American comic book series

- Textless artwork for issue #22, art by Terry Dodson and Rachel Dodson.

Publication information
- Publisher: DC Comics
- Schedule: Monthly
- Format: Ongoing series
- Genre: Superhero
- Publication date: September 2016 – July 2018
- No. of issues: 22 + Rebirth one-shot
- Main character(s): Batgirl; Black Canary; Huntress

Creative team
- Written by: Julie Benson; Shawna Benson
- Penciller(s): List: Rebirth #1; #1–3, 7 Claire Roe #4–6, 8–13, 15, 19–22 Roge Antonio #14, 16–18 Marcio Takara
- Inker(s): List: Rebirth #1; #1–3, 7 Claire Roe #4–6, 8–13, 15, 19–22 Roge Antonio #14, 16–18 Marcio Takara
- Letterer(s): List: Rebirth #1; #1–2 Steve Wands #3–8, 10, 16 Deron Bennett #9, 11–15 Josh Reed #17–18 Dezi Sienty #19–22 Saida Temofonte
- Colorist(s): List: Rebirth #1; #1–13 Allen Passalaqua #14, 18 Jordan Boyd #15–17, 19–22 Marcelo Maiolo
- Editor(s): List: Rebirth #1; #1–13 Chris Conroy #14–17 Mike Cotton #18–22 Katie Kubert

Collected editions
- Who is Oracle?: ISBN 978-1401268671
- Source Code: ISBN 978-1401273804
- Full Circle: ISBN 978-1401277819

Batgirl and the Birds of Prey is an ongoing American comic book series published by the comic book publishing company DC Comics and written by Julie Benson and Shawna Benson, starring the eponymous team. A one-shot was initially released in July 2016 as part of the DC Rebirth relaunch, before beginning publication as a monthly series in August. The series ran for 22 issues until May 2018.

== Publication history ==
Announced as part of DC Rebirth, the title debuted in July 2016 with the one-shot Batgirl and the Birds of Prey: Rebirth #1, before being released monthly. The first story arc follows Batgirl, Black Canary and the Huntress as they battle the Snake Men and Oracle, a villain using Batgirl's former codename.

The series is written by Julie Benson and Shawna Benson. Claire Roe illustrated the Rebirth one-shot and the first three issues of the monthly series. Roge Antonio took over illustration duties beginning with issue #4, finishing the art for the remaining of the first story arc. Issue #22 was listed for release in May 2018 as the final issue, in which the team finally confronts Calculator.

== Collected editions ==
Title	Collected material	Pages	Format	Publication date	ISBN
Volume 1: Who is Oracle?	Batgirl and the Birds of Prey: Rebirth #1; Batgirl and the Birds of Prey #1–6	168	Trade paperback	April 5, 2017	978-1401268671
Volume 2: Source Code	Batgirl and the Birds of Prey #7–13	168	Trade paperback	December 6, 2017	978-1401273804
Volume 3: Full Circle	Batgirl and the Birds of Prey #14–22	216	Trade paperback	July 18, 2018	978-1401277819

== Critical reception ==
The initial one-shot received an average score of 6.9/10 based on 32 critic reviews according to review aggregator Comic Book Roundup, while the overall series had a score of 6.9/10 based on the average of the 22 issues.
