= Viktor Bogdanovic =

Visual artist

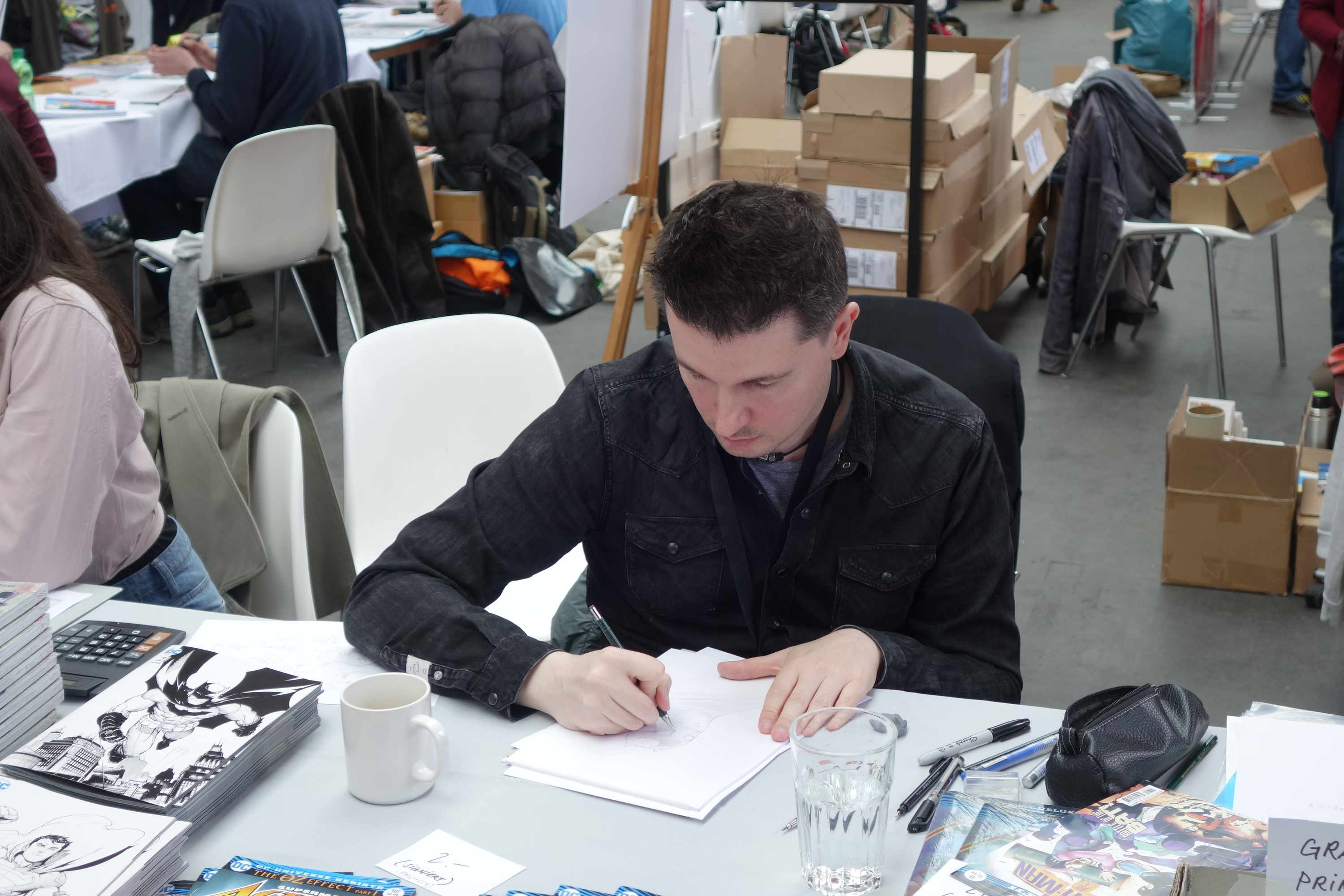
- Bogdanovic at the Comiciade convention in Aachen (2018)
- Born: 1981 (age 44–45) Basel, Switzerland
- Areas: Penciller, Inker
- Notable works: Batman: Arkham Knight; New Super-Man; Wolverine

Viktor Bogdanovic is a comic book artist best known for his work on DC and Marvel superheroes.

== Biography ==
Bogdanovic was born in Basel, Switzerland (where he attended School of Arts) and moved to Berlin, Germany with his family. Bogdanovic is of Serbian descent and studied at The Faculty of Philology at the University of Belgrade. He started drawing his own Superman and Spider-Man stories at the age of 12. His first paid work was drawings for a piercing shop. Bogdanovic did a few indie books before he got the chance to work on his first mini-series for Image Comics, which was called Reality Check. His career took off after his Batman: Arkham Knight run written by Peter Tomasi. Bogdanovic co-created Kong Kenan with Gene Luen Yang, and followed that with short stints on Superman with Dan Jurgens and The Terrifics with Jeff Lemire.

In 2020, he collaborated with Benjamin Percy on a story for Wolverine #1, which topped the sales charts in February, and was the regular artist on volume 7 before going back to DC.

His style was influenced by Erik Larsen, Greg Capullo and others.

== Bibliography ==
=== Image Comics ===
- Reality Check (2013)

=== DC Comics ===
- Batman: Arkham Knight (2015)
- Suicide Squad Most Wanted: Deadshot and Katana (2016)
- New Super-Man (2016)
- Action Comics (2016)
- The Silencer (2018)
- The Terrifics (2018)
- Detective Comics (2021)

=== Marvel Comics ===
- Wolverine (2020)
