= Kong Kenan =

Character from the Superman comics and related media

Kong Kenan Super-Man
- Kong Kenan as Super-Man from New Super-Man and the Justice League of China #20 (April 2018), art by Bernard Chang.

Publication information
- Publisher: DC Comics
- First appearance: New Super-Man #1 (July 2016)
- Created by: Gene Luen Yang; Viktor Bogdanovic

In-story information
- Species: Metahuman (enhanced by exposure to platinum kryptonite infused with Superman's qi)
- Place of origin: Shanghai, China
- Team affiliations: Justice League of China; Great Twenty; Superman family Justice League
- Partnerships: I-Ching; Superman; Green Arrow (Connor Hawke)
- Notable aliases: Super-Man; New Super-Man; Super-Man of China
- Abilities: Imbued with Superman's qi: Invulnerability; Superhuman strength; Superhuman hearing; X-ray vision; Superhuman speed; Heat vision; Freeze breath; Flight; Living embodiment of yin and yang: Magic; Resistance to magic; Light and darkness manipulation; Energy blasts; Enhanced physical attributes; Intangibility; Travel between the six Saṃsāric realms of rebirth and existence

Kong Kenan (Note: /koʊŋ ˈkʌnɑːn/ kohng KUH-nahn; Chinese: 孔克南; pinyin: Kǒng Kènán) is a superhero appearing in comic books published by DC Comics. Known as the Super-Man of China, the character first appeared in New Super-Man # 1 (July 2016). He was created by Gene Luen Yang and Viktor Bogdanovic.

== Publication history ==
A comic book series featuring a Chinese Superman who gains a portion of Superman's power debuted in July 2016 for DC Rebirth. The title was previously announced as The Super-Man but was changed to New Super-Man once Yang came on board and pointed out that there is no Chinese word for "the". The title initially shipped monthly. It became New Super-Man & the Justice League of China for issues #20-24.

Kong was given a new design and was featured as a supporting character of the Superman family in Action Comics #1051 in January 2023, which is the debut of a new format for the title and part of the Dawn of DC event.

== Fictional character biography ==
Kong Kenan is a 17-year old high school student from Shanghai whose estranged relationship with his father Kong Zhongdan after his mother Kuang Maitai died in a plane accident when Kenan was young turns him into a self-centered bully. Despite his arrogance, Kenan stands up to a local supervillain, which is captured on social media and turns him into a celebrity. Because of his heroic actions and recent stardom, Kenan is chosen by Doctor Omen of the Ministry of Self-Reliance to be the new Super-Man of China. Kenan is taken to the Ministry's headquarters at the Oriental Pearl Tower, where he is given superpowers by an unusual form of kryptonite infused with Superman's qi, which was imbued with the life force of the recently deceased New 52 Superman.

=== First adventures ===
When Kenan's Kryptonian powers make him even more arrogant, despite his difficulty controlling them, Omen lectures him on his role as a superhero and has him join the Ministry's new Justice League of China, which consists of him, the Wonder-Woman of China, Peng Deilan (the human identity of the mythical Green Snake) and the Bat-Man of China, Wang Baixi (the top pupil of China's Academy of the Bat). In an interview as Super-Man following the success of the JLC's first mission, Kenan foolishly attempts to impress reporter Laney Lan by revealing his secret identity and the Justice League of China's existence to the whole world, much to the shock and fury of his teammates and Omen.

On their next mission, the JLC encounters the mysterious Freedom Fighters of China and defeat them but are unable to capture their leader Flying Dragon General. Kenan realizes his mistake of exposing his secret identity and goes home to check on his father, who reveals himself to be Flying Dragon General.

Zhongdan explains that the Freedom Fighters of China are a pro-democracy group he formed with Maitai, his younger brother Zhonglun and their activist friends after they were inspired by the American Justice League to take up costumed identities to fight against the Chinese Communist Party. Believing Maitai's death was orchestrated by the Ministry, Zhongdan convinces Kenan to join Freedom Fighters. Meanwhile, the incarcerated Freedom Fighters stage a planned mass breakout and steal a Genetically Modified Starro - genetic material collected from Starro created by the Ministry as a mind controlling device. When Zhonglun, the Human Firecracker, uses the GMS to put Bat-Man and Wonder-Woman under mind control, he announces his plans to use the GMS on China's bureaucrats, but is rebuked by Zhongdan and Kenan. Human Firecracker declares them traitors and sets the Freedom Fighters, leaving them for dead but the two are rescued by Omen and her assistant Mingming. When the Ministry is alerted that the Freedom Fighters have hijacked a flight to Zhongnanhai, Kenan and Zhongdan leave to stop them. The two are able to board the plane mid flight and Kenan frees Bat-Man and Wonder-Woman. The JLC are able to defeat the Freedom Fighters and save all the passengers but Zhongdan is mortally wounded from protecting Kenan when Human Firecracker blows himself up with one of his explosives. After his father's funeral, Kenan tells Baixi and Deilan his father's findings about the Ministry, and both vow to help him bring his mother's murderers to justice as Doctor Omen secretly has Zhongdan's body preserved in a tank in her laboratory.

=== The truth about his parents ===
As his powers come from Superman's qi, Kenan approaches I-Ching to help control his qi and to fully unlock his powers. Under I-Ching's tutelage, Kenan learns that each of his powers are based around the Bagua, eight trigrams used in Taoism that represent the fundamental principles of reality, which gives him a better understanding of how his powers work. Kenan is hired by Lex Luthor to find a stop the speedster Avery Ho from stealing ancient Chinese artifacts in his possession at LexCorp and has I-Ching accompany him to Metropolis. At LexCorp, Luthor reveals that artifacts are the Ox Horse Door Rings, which can be used to open a portal to dimensional plane containing the energies needed to awaken Kenan's remaining superpowers. Before Kenan can open the portal, Avery arrives and warns that the portal leads to Diyu. Avery's former allies, the China White triad arrive to steal the artifacts from Luthor, starting a massive brawl which brings Superman to Lexcorp. During the fight, Luthor and I-Ching get trapped within Diyu, where Lex reveals that his true motive was to acquire the remains of the New 52 Superman containing his remaining powers. Kenan rescues Luthor (who fails to obtain the corpse) and I-Ching with Superman's and Avery's help. Luthor angrily dismisses Kenan from his service when he rejects Luthor's further offers for unlocking his powers. Kenan confides with Superman about the nature of his powers and his uncertainty with unlocking them, but Superman congratulates him on his progress and encourages him to train more to help him with a future conflict. Meanwhile, the China White triad meet with their employer, Ching Lung (a Fu Manchu-themed villain from Detective Comics #1), who sheds his disguise, revealing himself to be a splitting image of I-Ching.

Returning to China, Kenan invites Avery to the Justice League of China and she joins as their Flash. The JLC fights Super-Man Zero, a powerful but unstable genetically modified superhuman and the first attempt to create the Super-Man of China, who was unleashed from imprisonment by Ching Lung. Following the battle with Super-Man Zero, Bat-Man's robot sidekick Robinbot uncovers footage of Zhongdan's body being housed in Omen's laboratory. Just as Kenan confronts Dr. Omen, Super-Man Zero attacks the Pearl Oriental Tower after being granted additional powers and armor by Ching Lung and declaring himself "Emperor Super-Man". During the destruction, Omen reveals that she is Kenan's mother, Maitai.

Despite Kenan's efforts, he is too late to stop Emperor Super-Man from kidnapping Matai as the White China Triad takes a revived Zhongdan from his healing tank and Ching Lung imprisons I-Ching in the realm of ghosts. Emperor Super-Man releases the Freedom Fighters and takes over the Shanghai Tower, announcing his plans to reconquer China. Kenan rallies the JLC to stop Emperor Super-Man and together with the Great Ten, they defeat him, the White China Triad, Freedom Fighters and Suicide Squad, who were sent by Amanda Waller to eliminate both Super-Men as potential threats to the United States. Dr. Omen reveals to Kenan and Zhongdan that she specifically chose Kenan to be the Super-Man of China to due him being her son and that she had been working with the Ministry long before she met Zhongdan, having been ordered by them to infiltrate his activist group. Omen faked her death to deter Zhongdan and his allies from their activities, but to her dismay her death instead further radicalized them. Ching Lung uses his abilities to transform Emperor Super-Man into a Doomsday-like monster and Kenan puts an end to the tyrant's rampage at the cost of his own life. Instead of dying, Kenan finds himself transported to an American Chinatown in 1937 with Ching Lung. In the vision, Ching Lung recounts the atrocities Westerners committed against the Chinese, including showing Slam Bradley's racist attacks against Chinese Americans and the theft of a mystical amulet called the Red Jade Dragon during the Boxer Rebellion. Ching Lung reveals to Kenan his true identity: All-Yang, the embodiment of yang and the twin brother of I-Ching, the embodiment of yin. All-Yang tells Kenan to seek out the Red Jade Dragon in America, so that Kenan can use its powers to complete his training and activate his remaining powers, and that All-Yang will make him the new Emperor of China to destroy its enemies; in exchange, All-Yang will release I-Ching. Kenan awakens from his coma and over his parents' objections, leads the JLC to America to find the Red Jade Dragon.

=== Acquiring the Red Jade Dragon ===
The Justice League of China meet the American Justice League (Superman, Batman, Wonder Woman, Flash, Aquaman, and the Green Lanterns Simon Baz and Jessica Cruz) in Metropolis and the two Leagues use their powers and resources to locate the amulet, which Kenan and Superman follow to Lex Luthor's private estate. Kenan finds the Red Jade Dragon in Luthor's treasure collection and orders the magically summoned All-Yang to release I-Ching. All-Yang reneges on the deal, as I-Ching cannot be released from the realm of ghosts and when Kenan rejects his offer to be Emperor, he uses the Red Jade Dragon to open a portal to the realm of the demi-gods, unleashing several asuras in Metropolis. While the Justice Leagues fight the asuras (who are resistant to their attacks), Kenan communicates with I-Ching's spirit. I-Ching recounts his and All-Yang's pasts and their training as the embodiments of yin and yang. When the monks as their monastery implored each brother to accept a bit of the other one's nature to maintain perfect balance, All-Yang was insulted by suggestion to accept yin, which he viewed as inferior, and abandoned his training, forcing I-Ching to embody both yin and yang. I-Ching passes the mantle of yin and yang onto Kenan, changing the "S" on Kenan's chest to a yin and yang symbol. With his powers fully awakened by the Red Jade Dragon and I-Ching, Kenan closes the portal, weakening the asuras enough to be defeated by the Justice Leagues and absorbs All-Yang into his body. Afterwards, Kenan meets with his parents at the Oriental Pearl Tower, where he tells Omen he is leaving the Ministry of Self-Reliance and rejects Zhongdan's offer to reform the Freedom Fighters, declaring that the Justice League of China will now be working independently.

=== Leader of the Justice League of China ===
As the leader of the Justice League of China, Kenan relocates the team to Northeastern China while seeking the advice of I-Ching's spirit and resisting All-Yang's influence to deal with being the living embodiment of yin and yang. The League repeatedly clashes with the Lantern Corps of China, the Ministry of Self-Reliance's new superhero team, who have branded the League fugitives for their defection. The League intervenes at the China–North Korea border to rescue Ahn Kwang-Jo, a young North Korean defector with hydrokinetic abilities who can summon and communicate with mythical sea creatures, from North Korean forces, nearly sparking an international incident between the two nations. While under the JLC's care, Kwang-Jo is visited by the spirit of his "true father" King Munmu, who bestows his power onto his "son" by turning Kwang-Jo into an armor-clad dragon-human hybrid called the "Dragonson" and orders him to destroy North Korea. Kenan and the JLC are able to help the Dragonson fight off Munmu's influence and prevent the Korean peninsula from being flooded. Afterwards, Kenan recruits the Dragonson to the Justice League of China as its Aqua-Man while a water construct of Kwang-Jo is sent to prison in his place to trick the North Korean authorities.

Ignoring I-Ching's and All-Yang's warnings, Kenan attempts to rescue I-Ching from the realm of ghosts but accidentally sends himself and the JLC to there instead. The JLC are confronted by nightmarish future versions of themselves, but are rescued by I-Ching. I-Ching's help, Kenan sends himself and his teammates back to the human realm while I-Ching is forced to remain behind. Remembering I-Ching's last words to "let go of the goodness that can never be and embrace the goodness that is", Kenan is able to move on from his strained relationship with his parents and I-Ching's imprisonment and embraces his teammates as his new family.

=== Other adventures ===
In Action Comics Issue 983, Kenan assisted Superman, Supergirl, Lex Luthor, and Superwoman fight off General Zod, Cyborg Superman, Eradicator, and Mongul. Kenan made a cameo appearance during Doomsday Clock helping Superman fight off Black Adam's forces. Kenan later helps Superman deal with a villain called Prophecy and assists Supergirl in dealing with the Fatal Five. When Kenan returns to America to pose for pictures he crosses paths with Deathstroke and successfully takes him down in order to bring him to China.

While Superman is away from Metropolis, Kenan protects the city when a mechanical dragon from LexCorp goes haywire. Kenan receives help from Connor Hawke but when Connor's jar of kimchi is destroyed, Kenan retrieves pao cai from China to replace the dish and has dinner with Connor's Korean family.

=== Dawn of DC ===
Kenan becomes a member of the Superman family and helps the group thwart a terrorist attack by the anti-alien extremist Blue Earth group and attends the opening of the Steelworks Tower built by John Henry and Natasha Irons when it is attacked by Metallo. During House of Brainiac, Kong Kenan was captured by Brainiac in order to be killed by Brainiac Queen for her to be more powerful. He is freed by Conner Kent, and helps Superman hold off Brainiac's forces before being transported back to Earth.

== Personality ==
Initially, Kong Kenan was a self-centered bully who cared only for himself and looked down on those who he did not consider as important as he was. This all changed after standing up to Blue Condor and receiving the powers of Superman. Kenan is brash, headstrong and frequently rushes into situations without thinking. His core character is basically good, though he tends to make rash decisions based on his emotions. After the apparent death of his father, his attitude toward others changed and he became more focused. He has great respect toward Superman after meeting with him and receiving his advice and encouragement.

== Powers and abilities ==
Originally a normal human, Kong Kenan gained Kryptonian powers after being infused with Superman's qi by platinum kryptonite. Initially, Kenan had little control over his powers and would occasionally fluctuate whenever he lost focus. Under I-Ching's tutelage, Kenan was able to organize his super powers around the Bagua, eight trigrams used in Taoism that represent the fundamental principles of reality, by corresponding each power with a trigam and focusing his qi into a specific part of his body, which include:

Trigram	Body part	Superpower
0 坤 Kūn	Belly	Invulnerability
1 艮 Gèn	Fists	Superhuman Strength
2 坎 Kǎn	Ears	Superhuman Hearing
3 巽 Xùn	Thighs	X-Ray Vision
4 震 Zhèn	Feet	Superhuman Speed
5 離 Lí	Eyes	Heat Vision
6 兌 Duì	Mouth	Freeze Breath
7 乾 Qián	Head	Flight

At first only being able to activate one power at a time, Kenan's synchronization with the mystical Red Jade Dragon unlocked his full potential, allowing him to use all his powers simultaneously while greatly augmenting them as well.

After I-Ching bestowed the mantle as the living personification of yin and yang upon him, Kenan gained magical abilities and resistance to magic, as well as the ability to enter separate yin or yang forms. In his yang form, Kenan glows in a pure white light that can be channeled into energy blasts and his Kryptonian powers become greatly enhanced. However, Kenan's personality becomes arrogant and violent in this form. In his yin form, Kenan glows in a black, shadowy substance and gains a ghost like form that makes him intangible and can fire electric-like blasts from his fingers. Much like with his yang form, Kenan's yin form changes his personality to be detached and lethargic. Kenan's yin form also allows him to travel to the realm of ghosts but at a heavy price.

Much like with Superman and other Kryptonians (apart from platinum kryptonite), Kenan becomes weakened when exposed to kryptonite.

== Critical reception ==
Kong Kenan has been received with positive reviews, with many critics praising Kong Kenan's likeable personality, character arc, and the way he uses his super powers. Many critics have deemed Kong Kenan as one of the best Asian superheroes of all time. ComicBookWire wrote:

The New Super-Man displays a charming mix of arrogance and compassion that allows him to work well as a hero while still containing a realistic level of flaws. His character is complemented by Wonder-Woman and Bat-Man, who give Kenan opportunities for growth while still serving as interesting characters on their own. In addition, the personalities behind Kenan's mother and father add a lot to the narrative, especially when it comes to making the book's emotions more meaningful.

Aaron Berke from Comicsverse wrote:

Kong's story has been remarkably nuanced and engaging. Where Clark Kent learned how to be Superman with the homegrown moral guidance of Pa and Ma Kent, Kong Kenan has been learning to develop himself internally with the ancient wisdom of I-Ching. Over the course of the past few issues, Kong has accessed many of his abilities by opening himself up to others. Kong began the series as a selfish bully, but I-Ching has helped to chip away the layers of self-obsession.
