= Nailbiter (comic) =

Horror comic book series

- First issue cover.

Publication information
- Publisher: Image Comics
- Schedule: Monthly
- Genre: Horror, Crime, Psychological Thriller, Drama, Mystery, Police procedural,
- Publication date: May 2014 – March 2017
- No. of issues: 30

Creative team
- Written by: Joshua Williamson; Mike Henderson
- Artist: Mike Henderson
- Letterer: John J. Hill
- Colorist: Adam Guzowski
- Editor: Rob Levin

Collected editions
- There Will Be Blood: ISBN 1-63215-112-X
- Bloody Hands: ISBN 1-63215-232-0
- Blood in the Water: ISBN 1-63215-485-4
- Blood Lust: ISBN 1-63215-682-2
- Bound by Blood: ISBN 1-63215-892-2
- The Bloody Truth: ISBN 1-5343-0155-0
- Nailbiter Returns: ISBN 1-5343-1690-6
- Horror in the Sun: ISBN 1-5343-1865-8

Nailbiter is a horror comic book series that was created by Joshua Williamson and Mike Henderson, with art by Henderson. The series is published by Image Comics and its first issue was released on May 7, 2014. As of May 2017, the series has been collected into six volumes. The final monthly issue, number 30, was published in March 2017.

== Synopsis ==
The series centers around the fictional town of Buckaroo, Oregon, which has produced sixteen of the United States' worst serial killers, dubbed the Buckaroo Butchers by urban culture. Its most recent creation is Edward Charles Warren, otherwise known as "Nailbiter" due to his predilection for chewing off his victim's nails and part of their flesh. By the series's start Warren has been caught by FBI agent Charles Carroll, but Carroll has since gone missing, leaving it up to his friend and NSA agent Nicholas Finch to search for him. Nicholas decides to start his search in Buckaroo, where he begins to question why the small town has produced so many murderers.

== Collected editions ==
The series is primarily collected in trade paperbacks. The first twenty issues have been republished in hardcover format entitled Nailbiter: The Murder Edition, which includes extra material such as sketches and script pages.

Trade Paperbacks					Hardcover Editions				
#	Title	ISBN	Release date	Collected material	#	Title	ISBN	Release date	Collected material
1	Nailbiter: There Will Be Blood	ISBN 1-63215-112-X	October 1, 2014	Nailbiter #1–5.	1	The Murder Edition Volume 1	ISBN 1-63215-475-7	July 11, 2016	Nailbiter #1–10.
2	Nailbiter: Bloody Hands	ISBN 1-63215-232-0	March 17, 2015	Nailbiter #6–10.	1	The Murder Edition Volume 1	ISBN 1-63215-475-7	July 11, 2016	Nailbiter #1–10.
3	Nailbiter: Blood in the Water	ISBN 1-63215-485-4	September 15, 2015	Nailbiter #11–15.	2	The Murder Edition Volume 2	ISBN 1-5343-0754-0	March 20, 2018	Nailbiter #11–20.
4	Nailbiter: Blood Lust	ISBN 1-63215-682-2	April 12, 2016	Nailbiter #16–20.	2	The Murder Edition Volume 2	ISBN 1-5343-0754-0	March 20, 2018	Nailbiter #11–20.
5	Nailbiter: Bound by Blood	ISBN 1-63215-892-2	November 8, 2016	Nailbiter / Hack/Slash Special, Nailbiter #21–25.	3	The Murder Edition Volume 3	ISBN 1-5343-1206-4	May 7, 2019	Nailbiter #21–30
6	Nailbiter: The Bloody Truth	ISBN 1-5343-0155-0	May 9, 2017	Nailbiter #26–30	3	The Murder Edition Volume 3	ISBN 1-5343-1206-4	May 7, 2019	Nailbiter #21–30
7	Nailbiter: Nailbiter Returns	ISBN 1-5343-1690-6	October 28, 2020	Nailbiter Returns #1–5					
8	Nailbiter: Horror in the Sun	ISBN 1-5343-1865-8	March 24, 2021	Nailbiter Returns #6–10					

== Sequel series ==
Williamson and Henderson teamed up to produce a sequel series entitled Nailbiter Returns. It begins one day after the conclusion of the original series and delves further into the mythology surrounding the Butchers of Buckaroo. The first issue was released on June 3, 2020, concluding with issue #10 on February 24, 2021.

== Reception ==
Critical reception for the series has been mostly positive. Newsarama called it a "masterful bit of horror". Comic Book Resources panned Nailbiter's first issue, as they felt that the work did not live up to its premise's potential despite good coloring and artwork. In contrast, IGN praised Nailbiter #1, stating that it was "an impressive and eerie debut that's sure to turn your sweetest dreams into the stuff of nightmares". Flickering Myth has written predominantly negative reviews for later issues in the series, criticizing it for its pacing and story lines. Bloody Disgusting gave mostly favorable critical reviews.

Nailbiter was awarded "Best Horror Comic" by USA Today in both 2014 and 2015. It was also the #1 comic on Horror Talks "Best of 2015."
