= Birthright (comic book) =

Series by Williamson & Bressan (2014-2021)

- Birthright #1 (October 2014). Cover art by Andrei Bressan.

Publication information
- Publisher: Skybound Entertainment / Image Comics
- Schedule: Monthly
- Format: Ongoing series
- Genre: Epic Fantasy
- Publication date: October 2014 – June 2021
- No. of issues: 50
- Main characters: Mikey Rhodes; Aaron Rhodes; Brennan Rhodes; Rook; Lore; Rya

Creative team
- Created by: Joshua Williamson; Andrei Bressan
- Written by: Joshua Williamson
- Artist: Andrei Bressan
- Letterer: Pat Brosseau
- Colorist: Adriano Lucas

Collected editions
- Homecoming: ISBN 1-63215-231-2
- Call to Adventure: ISBN 1-63215-446-3
- Allies and Enemies: ISBN 1-63215-683-0
- Family History: ISBN 1-63215-871-X
- Belly of the Beast: ISBN 1-5343-0218-2
- Fatherhood: ISBN 1-5343-0498-3
- Blood Brothers: ISBN 1-5343-1053-3
- Live by the Sword: ISBN 1-5343-1368-0
- War of the Worlds: ISBN 1-5343-1601-9
- Epilogue: ISBN 1-5343-1948-4

Birthright is an American comic book series written by Joshua Williamson and drawn by Andrei Bressan, announced July 14, 2014 and released October 8, 2014. This monthly comic book series is produced by Skybound Entertainment and published by Image Comics.

A feature film adaptation of the series has been in development from Skybound Entertainment and Universal Pictures since January 2018.

== Plot ==
Days before his surprise birthday party, young Mikey Rhodes goes missing. No one is sure what happened — his father is accused of murder, his mother breaks down at the realization of her deepest fears, and his older brother watches as his family falls to pieces. All seems to be lost for the Rhodes until Mikey's miraculous return one year later.

But something is different; Mikey is back, but he's not the same boy they once knew. He's returned as an adult, having ventured into another world called Terrenos and being raised as a warrior, a savior. Filled with an extraordinary purpose, Mikey is now on a path to fulfilling a destiny larger, darker, and more dangerous than his family can imagine. Can Mikey be fully trusted? What happened in Terrenos, and what horrors have followed him back?

== Development ==
When asked about where the idea for Birthright came from, Williamson says, "Destiny. I thought a lot about life and life goals. What do you do after you get what you want. If you set a big goal and then accomplish it… what happens next. Again, when I would watch movies, or TV shows, I always found myself interested in what came after."

== Adaptation ==
In January 2018, Skybound Entertainment and Universal Pictures announced that a feature film adaptation was underway being headed up by Cinco Paul and Ken Daurio.
