= DC Rebirth =

2016 DC Comics relaunch

- Promotional image

Publication information
- Publisher: DC Comics
- Genre: Superhero
- Publication date: May 25, 2016 – November 29, 2017
- Main character: DC Universe

Creative team
- Written by: Various
- Artist: Various

DC Rebirth is a 2016 relaunch by the American comic book publisher DC Comics of its entire line of ongoing monthly superhero comic book titles. Using the end of The New 52 (2011–2016) initiative in May 2016 as its launching point, DC Rebirth restored the DC Universe to a form much like that prior to the 2011 "Flashpoint" storyline while still incorporating numerous elements of The New 52, including its continuity. It also saw many of its titles move to a bimonthly release schedule, along with being released at US$2.99.

DC Comics ended the Rebirth branding in December 2017, opting to include everything under a larger "DC Universe" banner and naming. The continuity and repercussions established by Rebirth continues into the New Justice (2018–2021), Infinite Frontier (2021–2023), Dawn of DC (2023–2024), and DC All In (2024–present) eras.

== Publication history ==
=== DC Universe: Rebirth Special and initiative launch ===
In January 2016, DC Comics co-publishers Dan DiDio and Jim Lee tweeted an image of a blue curtain with the word "Rebirth" on it, teasing the event's release. The following month, DC announced its Rebirth initiative, a line-wide relaunch of its titles, to begin in June 2016. Beginning with an 80-page one-shot which was released on May 25, 2016, Rebirth returned Action Comics and Detective Comics to their previous numbering (#957 and #934, respectively). It also released all comic titles at the price of US$2.99, multiple books shifted to a twice-monthly release schedule, a number of existing titles relaunched with new #1s, and several new titles were released.

Wrap-around cover of DC Universe: Rebirth #1 (July 2016). Art by Gary Frank.

Geoff Johns, president and CCO of DC Entertainment, described the 80-page one-shot as "re-laying the groundwork for DC's future while celebrating the past and present. It's not about throwing anything away. It's quite the opposite." On the initiative, which was described as a rebirth of the DC Universe, Johns called Rebirth more "in the same vein as Green Lantern: Rebirth and The Flash: Rebirth. Some things alter and change, but it's more character-driven, and it's also more about revealing secrets and mysteries within the DC Universe about "Flashpoint" and The New 52 that are part of a bigger tapestry." The Rebirth initiative would reintroduce concepts from pre-"Flashpoint" continuity that The New 52 had done away with, and build "on everything that's been published since Action Comics #1 up thru The New 52." Lee said that Johns "came up with this brilliant story [for the DC Universe: Rebirth Special] that basically allows us to seat the New 52 within the continuity that preceded it. So it really synchronizes and harmonizes pre-52 with New 52 continuity".

Creative teams for the Rebirth titles, along with some art and storylines, were revealed at WonderCon 2016. Johns worked with each writing team and the editors for the titles to help refocus "on these characters, deconstructing them down to their core DNA and building out story arcs based on that DNA". Additionally, two titles part of the initial announcement in February, Gotham Academy: Second Semester and Earth 2, were revealed to no longer be considered Rebirth titles, instead acting as continuations of their New 52 titles, Gotham Academy and Earth 2: Society, respectively. Regarding the decision to focus on fewer titles, with some shipping twice-monthly, DiDio said, "What we did was eliminate some of the lower ranked titles, and we're trying to incorporate those ideas into the main books themselves, because we feel that makes the main books stronger" adding, "we look at things like... Gotham by Midnight. And I loved Gotham by Midnight, but it never got the sampling that a Batman book would. But if we did that Gotham by Midnight story and integrated it into the Batman series that was shipping twice monthly, there was a better chance for people to see those characters, get excited by those characters, and more importantly, if we ever decided to thin them out, maybe we'd have a stronger audience and a better chance for series like that to succeed." DiDio also revealed that DC had breaks in the schedule "where we'll decide whether or not a double-ship is working" and potentially change it to monthly status. "We're going to be examining that on a regular basis", he added. "We're not going to keep book double-shipping if we don't think the demand is there."

Regarding the release of variant covers for titles, Lee said, "we're only using specialty variants with comic book shops and variant covers in judicious ways. We're not going to have a gazillion SKUs across the entire line. We find that, at that point, why publish a story inside at all, if you're just going to build a business based on variant covers. We're still using variant covers, but we're actually using one variant cover artist for each book. They sort of get tenure, as it were. And they're going to be responsible for being the alternate cover artist on that book. And we're only doing it on our top-selling books."

On May 27, 2016, DC announced that DC Universe: Rebirth Special #1 would receive a second printing. The re-release, being sold at US$5.99, featured an update to Gary Frank's cover, better revealing the outstretched hand of Doctor Manhattan in the top right corner, as well as a square-bound format. Less than a week later, DC revealed the title would receive a third printing, again being released at US$5.99 with a square-bound format and a new cover from Frank. Additionally, the first wave of Rebirth one-shots – Superman: Rebirth, Batman: Rebirth, Green Lanterns: Rebirth and Green Arrow: Rebirth – also received second printings, with a recolored Rebirth banner to differentiate it from the original printing. A fourth printing featured a cover by Ethan Van Sciver depicting the scene where Wally West interrupts Batman in the Batcave, with the image of three Jokers on the Batcomputer. DC Universe: Rebirth Special's fifth printing, announced in August 2016, featured a new cover by Phil Jimenez that depicts Barry Allen and Wally West grabbing each other's hands.

=== Second phase, price increase, and the end of Rebirth ===
In September 2016, DC announced the Justice League vs. Suicide Squad miniseries for release in December 2016 through January 2017, which would "reintroduce a supervillain that hasn't been seen for some time." Johns called the story in the miniseries "another building block to 'Rebirth'" that would "set the stage for 'Rebirth' Phase 2" with the reemergence of "a surprising team... and another piece of the puzzle of the future of the DC Universe, and the past, [coming] into focus." The second phase of Rebirth began in February 2017, with the launch of Justice League of America, Super Sons, and Batwoman. In January 2017, DC announced the four-issue storyline "The Button" for release in April and May 2017. Taking place in issues 21 and 22 of Batman and The Flash, the storyline continues plot elements from the DC Universe: Rebirth Special with Batman and Barry Allen investigating the mystery of the Comedian's smiley face button found in the Batcave. Shortly after, DC revealed that in April 2017, all of the monthly titles releasing at the time (Batgirl, Batgirl and the Birds of Prey, Batman Beyond, Batwoman, Blue Beetle, Cyborg, The Hellblazer, New Superman, Red Hood and the Outlaws, Super Sons, Supergirl, Superwoman, Teen Titans, Titans, and Trinity), would increase their price to US$3.99, with All-Star Batman continuing to maintain its US$4.99 price. To account for the price increase, each physical copy came with a code to redeem a free digital copy of the title. DC also indicated that the semi-monthly titles would stay at the US$2.99 price point.

In May 2017, DC announced the miniseries Doomsday Clock for release in November 2017. Written by Johns with art by Frank, it continues the story presented in the DC Universe: Rebirth Special and "The Button" storyline focusing on Superman and Doctor Manhattan. Speaking on the project, Johns said, "It is Watchmen colliding with the DC Universe. It is the most personal and most epic, utterly mind-bending project I have ever worked on in my career. With Rebirth, I opened the door to Manhattan. Part of that was I loved the real-world influence Watchmen has. I put Manhattan out there, and always thought there was a Manhattan/Superman story to be told... at the core of it, there's a being who has lost his humanity and distanced himself from it, and an alien who embodies humanity more than most humans. I love the idea that Watchmen influenced DC, but what would that look like in reverse? And it goes well beyond that." Johns indicated the miniseries would not be a sequel to Watchmen and would be a stand-alone story, with no tie-in material. Despite this, Johns noted Doomsday Clock "will have an impact on the entire DC Universe. It will affect everything moving forward and everything that has come before. It will touch the thematic and literal essence of DC." Johns also noted that the miniseries would be set one year in the future of the DC Universe, so by the time the final issue releases, "the rest of the universe will have caught up to it — and the repercussions of the event will become known."

In October 2017, DC revealed that they would be discontinuing the Rebirth branding and logo from their titles in December 2017, releasing everything under a single umbrella title as the "DC Universe". Coincided with the release of the New Age of Heroes imprint, DiDio explained, "We want to make it clear that this is all the DC Universe... Rebirth pretty much is the DCU now; while we're taking Rebirth off the books, we'll be following the direction that Rebirth established." Titles also received new trade dresses, with those "that tie in clearly to our larger DC Universe" having a "DCU logo on them" in addition to corner boxes with icons of the characters to help identify the family of titles; titles outside the DCU, such as Injustice 2 and DC Bombshells would simply have the DC logo on them. DC planned to continue their dual cover release of titles as they have "seen a genuine interest in them, as they're well accepted by both fans and retailers".

== Changes for the DC Universe ==
With the release of DC Universe: Rebirth Special, characters not seen during the New 52 line of DC Comics comic books, such as the first version of the character Wally West, Jackson Hyde and Ryan Choi, reappeared in the DC Comics line of comic books, while other characters, such as Ted Kord and Ray Palmer, were revised to be similar to their characters as they appeared prior to the "Flashpoint" storyline. Within the story, Wally states to Barry Allen that the cause of the alterations to "history" following the end of "Flashpoint" was an outside force (revealed to be Doctor Manhattan from the Watchmen universe) removing 10 years of history from the internal timeline of the comic books' stories (resulting in the younger age of heroes in the "New 52" storyline, the resurrections of several deceased characters, and the loss of legacy and previous relationships) rather than Barry's merging of several alternate timelines, as was previously presented in the "Flashpoint" story.

Nearly all characters had their designs revised. Some of those who are also featured in the DC Extended Universe (WarnerMedia's film franchise based on DC Comics characters) now more closely resemble their on-screen counterparts, such as Harley Quinn and Wonder Woman.

Another new character is the enigmatic "Mr. Oz", who is watching Earth, kidnapping characters such as Mister Mxyzptlk, Doomsday and Tim Drake, as he hinted they would play very important roles in the future, and insisted they must remain "off the field".

At the end of the "Superman Reborn" event in April 2017, a story in the comic book Action Comics presents Superman, alongside his wife Lois Lane and their son Jonathan Samuel Kent, merging the "timelines" of the DC Comics superhero line from before and after the "Flashpoint" event into a single fictional reality, resulting in further change to the internal timeline of the fictional world of DC Comics superheroes. Peter J. Tomasi said that "The events of Action #976 reset and reshape the entire Superman timeline. Where there had been two Superman, their realities have now been fused into one timeline with just one of them."

DC Comics representatives stated that the books will deal with the aftermath of Doctor Manhattan's actions by the end of the Doomsday Clock miniseries.

== Titles ==
=== Ongoing series ===
At WonderCon 2016, DC revealed the initial titles under four different "families", grouping similar characters or titles together.

==== Batman ====
These titles feature Batman and the "Batman Family" of characters.

Title	Publication dates / Issues	Initial creative team^{[note1]}	Notes / References
Batman	June 2016 – May 2026 (1–163, plus 4 annuals)	Writer; Tom King; Artists; David Finch; Mikel Janin	The title initially shipped twice monthly.
Detective Comics	June 2016 – present (934–, plus 3 annuals )	Writer; James Tynion IV; Artists; Eddy Barrows; Alvaro Martinez	Featuring a team initially consisting of Tim Drake, Stephanie Brown, Cassandra Cain and Clayface, led by Batman and Batwoman. The title initially shipped twice monthly.
Batgirl	July 2016 – October 2020 (1–50, plus 2 annuals)	Writer; Hope Larson; Artist; Rafael Albuquerque; Christian Wildgoose	Focusing on Barbara Gordon. The title initially shipped monthly.
Nightwing	July 2016 – present (1–, plus 2 annuals)	Writer; Tim Seeley; Artists; Javi Fernandez; Marcus To	Focusing on Dick Grayson. The title initially shipped twice monthly. It began shipping monthly in April 2018 before returning to a twice monthly schedule in September 2018.
All-Star Batman	August 2016 – October 2017 (1–14)	Writer; Scott Snyder; Artists; Multiple	Artists for the series include John Romita, Jr., Jock, Sean Murphy, Paul Pope, Tula Lotay, Afua Richardson, Francesco Francavilla, and more. The title initially shipped monthly.
Batgirl & the Birds of Prey	August 2016 – May 2018 (1–22)	Writers; Julie Benson; Shawna Benson; Artist; Claire Roe; Roge Antonio	Focusing on the team consisting of Barbara Gordon, Black Canary and Huntress. The title initially shipped monthly.
Batwoman	March 2017 – August 2018 (1–18)	Writers; Marguerite Bennett; James Tynion IV; Artist; Steve Epting	The title initially shipped monthly.

==== Superman/Wonder Woman ====
These titles feature Superman, the "Superman Family" of characters and Wonder Woman.

Title	Publication dates / Issues	Initial creative team^{[note1]}	Notes / References
Action Comics	June 2016 – present (957– )	Writer; Dan Jurgens; Artists; Patrick Zircher; Tyler Kirkham; Stephen Segovia	Featuring the pre-Flashpoint Superman existing alongside Clark Kent, as well as Lex Luthor in his Superman armor. The title initially shipped twice monthly.
Superman	June 2016 – April 2018 (1–45, plus 1 annual)	Writers; Peter J. Tomasi; Patrick Gleason; Artists; Patrick Gleason; Doug Mahnke	This title focuses on the pre-Flashpoint Superman's family, and follows the story through his son Jon Kent's eyes. The title initially shipped twice monthly.
Wonder Woman	June 2016 – December 2019 (1–83, plus 3 annuals)	Writer; Greg Rucka; Artists; Liam Sharp; Nicola Scott	For the first 12 issues, the odd numbered issues told a story, "Wonder Woman: The Lies", in the present, with Sharp as the artist. For the even numbered issues, Rucka told the story "Wonder Woman: Year One", set in the past, with Scott as the artist. The title initially shipped twice monthly.
New Super-Man	July 2016 – June 2018 (1–24)	Writer; Gene Luen Yang; Artist; Viktor Bogdanovic	Focusing on a Chinese teenager named Kong Kenan who gains a portion of Superman's power. The title was previously announced as The Super-Man but was changed once Yang came on board and pointed out that there is no Chinese word for "the". The title initially shipped monthly. It became New Super-Man & the Justice League of China for issues #20-24
Superwoman	August 2016 – January 2018 (1–18)	Writer; Phil Jimenez; Artists; Phil Jimenez; Emmanuela Lupacchino	Focusing on Lana Lang who had gained superpowers. The title initially shipped monthly.
Supergirl	September 2016 – May 2020 (1–42, plus 2 annuals)	Writer; Steve Orlando; Artist; Brian Ching	Focusing on Kara Zor-El. The title initially shipped monthly.
Trinity	September 2016 – April 2018 (1–22, plus 1 annual)	Writer; Francis Manapul; Artists; Francis Manapul; Clay Mann	Focusing on Batman, Superman and Wonder Woman. The title initially shipped monthly.

==== Justice League ====
These titles feature characters related to the Justice League, as well as the Green Lantern Corps and the Teen Titans.

Title	Publication dates / Issues	Initial creative team^{[note1]}	Notes / References
Aquaman	June 2016 – December 2020 (1-66, plus 1 annual)	Writer; Dan Abnett; Artists; Brad Walker; Jesus Merino; Phil Briones	The title initially shipped twice monthly. It began shipping monthly in July 2017.
The Flash	June 2016 – April 2020 (1– 88), plus 3 annuals	Writer; Joshua Williamson; Artists; Carmine Di Giandomenico; Neil Googe	Focusing on Barry Allen. The title initially shipped twice monthly.
Green Lanterns	June 2016 – October 2018 (1–57), plus 1 annuals	Writer; Sam Humphries; Artists; Robson Rocha; Ardian Syaf	Set on Earth, the title follows the two newest human Green Lanterns, Simon Baz and Jessica Cruz. The title initially shipped twice monthly.
Hal Jordan and the Green Lantern Corps	July 2016 – August 2018 (1–50)	Writer; Rob Venditti; Artists; Ethan Van Sciver; Rafa Sandoval	Focusing on Hal Jordan, John Stewart, Guy Gardner, the other members of the Green Lantern Corps and White Lantern Kyle Rayner. The title initially shipped twice monthly.
Justice League	July 2016 – April 2018 (1–43)	Writer; Bryan Hitch; Artists; Tony Daniel; Fernando Pasarin	Featuring on a team consisting of Aquaman, Batman, Cyborg, Flash (Barry Allen), Superman, Wonder Woman, and the Green Lanterns Simon Baz and Jessica Cruz. The title initially shipped twice monthly.
Titans	July 2016 – April 2019 (1–36, plus 2 annuals)	Writer; Dan Abnett; Artist; Brett Booth	Focusing on a team consisting of Wally West, Dick Grayson, Donna Troy, Arsenal, Garth, and Lilith Clay. The title initially shipped monthly. It began shipping twice monthly in September 2018.
Cyborg	September 2016 – June 2018 (1-23)	Writer; John Semper; Artists; Will Conrad; Paul Pelletier	The title initially shipped twice monthly. It began shipping monthly in January 2017.
Teen Titans	October 2016 – November 2020 (1–47, plus 2 annuals and 2 specials)	Writer; Ben Percy; Artist; Jonboy Meyers; Khoi Pham	Focusing on a team consisting of Damian Wayne, Starfire, Raven, Beast Boy, and Wally West II. The title initially shipped monthly.
Justice League of America	February 2017 – April 2018 (1–29, plus 1 annual)	Writer; Steve Orlando; Artists; Ivan Reis; Joe Prado	Spinning out of the events seen in the miniseries, Justice League vs. Suicide Squad. Focusing on an initial team of Atom (Ryan Choi), Vixen, Ray (Ray Terrill), Killer Frost (Caitlin Snow), Batman, Black Canary and Lobo. The title initially shipped twice monthly.

==== Other ====
These titles do not fall under the larger headings above, or were not announced with those titles.

Title	Publication dates / Issues	Initial creative team^{[note1]}	Notes / References
Green Arrow	June 2016 – March 2019 (1–50, plus 1 annual)	Writer; Ben Percy; Artists; Otto Schmidt; Juan Ferreyra	The title initially shipped twice monthly. It began shipping monthly in November 2017.
Deathstroke	August 2016 – December 2019 (1–50), plus 1 annual	Writer; Christopher Priest; Artists; Carlo Pagulyan; Igor Vitorino; Felipe Watanabe	The title initially shipped twice monthly. It began shipping monthly in June 2017.
Harley Quinn	August 2016 – October 2020 (1–75)	Writers; Jimmy Palmiotti; Amanda Conner; Artists; Chad Hardin; John Timms	The title initially shipped twice monthly.
Hellblazer	August 2016 – July 2018 (1–24)	Writer; Simon Oliver; Artist; Moritat	Focusing on John Constantine. The title initially shipped monthly.
Red Hood and the Outlaws	August 2016 - December 2020 (1–52, plus 2 annuals)	Writer; Scott Lobdell; Artist; Dexter Soy	Focusing on a team consisting of Jason Todd, Bizarro and Artemis. Starting from Issue 26 the series was rebranded as Red Hood Outlaw, where Red Hood now works solo. The title initially shipped monthly.
Suicide Squad	August 2016 – January 2019 (1–50 ), plus 1 annual	Writer; Rob Williams; Artists; Jim Lee; Philip Tan	Focusing on a team consisting of Harley Quinn, Killer Croc, Deadshot, Rick Flag, Katana, Captain Boomerang, The Enchantress, and a "couple other ones". The title initially shipped twice monthly.
Blue Beetle	September 2016 – February 2018 (1–18)	Writer; Keith Giffen; Artist; Scott Kolins	Focusing on Ted Kord and Jaime Reyes. The title initially shipped monthly.
Batman Beyond	October 2016 – December 2020 (1–50)	Writer; Dan Jurgens; Artist; Bernard Chang	Focusing on Terry McGinnis. The title initially shipped monthly.
Super Sons	February 2017 – May 2018 (1–16, plus 1 annual)	Writers; Peter J. Tomasi; Artist; Jorge Jimenez	Focusing on Damian Wayne and Jonathan Kent, the sons of Batman and Superman, respectively. The title initially shipped monthly. The title was originally revealed with Chris Burns and Dennis Culver serving as writers.

=== One-shots ===
Title	Creative team	Notes / References
DC Universe: Rebirth Special #1; May 2016	Writer; Geoff Johns; Artists; Ivan Reis; Phil Jimenez; Ethan Van Sciver; Gary Frank	
Aquaman Rebirth #1; June 2016	Writer; Dan Abnett; Artists; Brad Walker; Jesus Merino; Phil Briones	
Batman Rebirth #1; June 2016	Writers; Tom King; Scott Snyder; Artist; Mikel Janin	
The Flash Rebirth #1; June 2016	Writer; Josh Williamson; Artists; Carmine Di Giandomenico; Neil Googe	
Green Arrow Rebirth #1; June 2016	Writer; Ben Percy; Artists; Otto Schmidt; Juan Ferreya	
Green Lanterns Rebirth #1; June 2016	Writers; Geoff Johns; Sam Humphries; Artists; Ethan Van Sciver; Ed Benes	
Superman Rebirth #1; June 2016	Writers; Peter J. Tomasi; Patrick Gleason; Artist; Doug Mahnke	
Titans Rebirth #1; June 2016	Writer; Dan Abnett; Artist; Brett Booth	
Wonder Woman Rebirth #1; June 2016	Writer; Greg Rucka; Artist; Phil Winslade	
Batgirl and the Birds of Prey Rebirth #1; July 2016	Writer; Julie Benson; Shawna Benson; Artist; Claire Roe	
Hal Jordan and the Green Lantern Corps Rebirth #1; July 2016	Writer; Rob Venditti; Artist; Ethan Van Sciver	
The Hellblazer Rebirth #1; July 2016	Writer; Simon Oliver; Artist; Moritat	
Justice League Rebirth #1; July 2016	Bryan Hitch	
Nightwing Rebirth #1; July 2016	Writer; Tim Seeley; Artist; Yanick Paquette	
Red Hood and the Outlaws Rebirth #1; July 2016	Writer; Scott Lobdell; Artist; Dexter Soy	
Blue Beetle Rebirth #1; August 2016	Writer; Keith Giffen; Artist; Scott Kolins	
Deathstroke Rebirth #1; August 2016	Writer; Christopher Priest; Artists; Carlo Pagulyan; Igor Vitorino; Felipe Watanabe	
Suicide Squad Rebirth #1; August 2016	Writer; Rob Williams; Artist; Phillip Tan	
Suicide Squad: War Crimes Special #1; August 2016	Writer; John Ostrander; Artist; Gus Vazquez	
Supergirl Rebirth #1; August 2016	Writer; Steve Orlando; Artist; Emmanuela Lupacchino	
Batman Beyond Rebirth #1; September 2016	Writer; Dan Jurgens; Artist; Bernard Chang; Ryan Sook	
Cyborg Rebirth #1; September 2016	Writer; John Semper; Artists; Will Conrad; Paul Pelletier	
Teen Titans Rebirth #1; September 2016	Writer; Ben Percy; Artist; Jonboy Meyers	
Justice League Director's Cut #1; October 2016	Writer; Bryan Hitch; Artist; Tony S. Daniel	
Batman Director's Cut #1; November 2016	Writer; Tom King; Artist; David Finch	
All-Star Batman Director's Cut #1; December 2016	Writer; Scott Snyder; Artist; John Romita, Jr.	
DC Rebirth Holiday Special #1; December 2016	Writers; Multiple; Artists; Multiple	
Justice League of America: The Atom Rebirth #1; January 2017	Writer; Steve Orlando; Artist; Andy Macdonald	Prelude to the Justice League of America series. Focusing on Ryan Choi.
Justice League of America: Killer Frost Rebirth #1; January 2017	Writers; Steve Orlando; Jody Houser; Artist; Mirka Andolfo	Prelude to the Justice League of America series. Focusing on Caitlin Snow.
Justice League of America: The Ray Rebirth #1; January 2017	Writer; Steve Orlando; Artist; Stephen Byrne	Prelude to the Justice League of America series. Focusing on Ray Terrill.
Justice League of America: Vixen Rebirth #1; January 2017	Writers; Steve Orlando; Jody Houser; Artist; Jamal Campbell	Prelude to the Justice League of America series.
Batwoman Rebirth #1; February 2017	Writers; Marguerite Bennett; James Tynion IV; Artists; Ben Oliver; Steve Epting	
Justice League of America Rebirth #1; February 2017	Writer; Steve Orlando; Artist; Andy Macdonald	
Suicide Squad Director's Cut #1; March 2017	Writer; Rob Williams; Artists; Jim Lee; Jason Fabok; Ivan Reis	
Dark Days: The Forge #1; June 2017	Writer; Scott Snyder; James Tynion IV; Artists; Jim Lee; Andy Kubert; John Romita Jr. others	Prelude to Dark Nights: Metal.
Dark Days: The Casting #1; July 2017	Writer; Scott Snyder; James Tynion IV; Artists; Jim Lee; Andy Kubert; John Romita Jr. others	Prelude to Dark Nights: Metal.
Batman: The Red Death #1; September 2017	Writer; Joshua Williamson; Artist; Carmine Di Giandomenico	Tie-in to Dark Nights: Metal.
Batman: The Murder Machine #1; September 2017	Writer; Frank Tieri; Artist; Ricardo Federici	Tie-in to Dark Nights: Metal.
Batman: The Dawnbreaker #1; October 2017	Writer; Sam Humphries; Artist; Ethan Van Sciver	Tie-in to Dark Nights: Metal.
Dark Days: The Forge / The Casting Director's Cut #1; October 2017	Writers; Scott Snyder; James Tynion IV; Artists; Jim Lee; Andy Kubert; John Romita Jr. others	
Batman: The Drowned #1; October 2017	Writer; Dan Abnett; Artist; Philip Tan	Tie-in to Dark Nights: Metal.
Batman: The Merciless #1; October 2017	Writer; Peter J. Tomasi; Artist; Francis Manapul	Tie-in to Dark Nights: Metal.
Batman: The Devastator #1; November 2017	Writer; Frank Tieri; Artist; Tony S. Daniel	Tie-in to Dark Nights: Metal.
Batman: Lost #1; November 2017	Writers; Scott Snyder; James Tynion IV; Joshua Williamson; Artists; Doug Mahnke; Jamie Mendoza; Yanick Paguette; Jorge Jimenez	Tie-in to Dark Nights: Metal.
The Batman Who Laughs #1; November 2017	Writer; James Tynion IV; Artist; Riley Rossmo	Tie-in to Dark Nights: Metal.
Dark Nights: Metal Director's Cut #1; November 2017	Writer; Scott Snyder; Artist; Greg Capullo	
Hawkman: Found #1; December 2017	Writer; Jeff Lemire; Artists; Bryan Hitch; Kevin Nowlan	Tie-in to Dark Nights: Metal.
Dark Knights Rising: The Wild Hunt #1; February 2018	Writers; Scott Snyder; James Tynion IV; Joshua Williamson; Artists; Doug Mahnke; Ivan Reis	Tie-in to Dark Nights: Metal.

A Rebirth issue for Trinity was also planned for release in August 2016, written by Francis Manapul with art by Manapul and Clay Mann, but it was never released.

=== Miniseries ===
Title	Creative team	Notes / References
Justice League vs. Suicide Squad #1–6; December 2016 – January 2017	Writer; Joshua Williamson; Artists; Jason Fabok; Tony S. Daniel	
Dark Nights: Metal #1–6; August 2017 – March 2018	Writer; Scott Snyder; Artist; Greg Capullo	
Doomsday Clock #1–12; November 2017 – December 2019	Writer; Geoff Johns; Artists; Gary Frank; Brad Anderson	
Batman and the Signal #1–3; January 2018 – April 2018	Writers; Scott Snyder; Tony Patrick; Artist; Cully Hamner	Focusing on Duke Thomas and spinning out of All-Star Batman and the New 52 title We Are Robin.
Justice League: No Justice #1–4; May 2018	Writers; Scott Snyder; Joshua Williamson; Artist; Francis Manapul	Dark Nights: Metal left the DCU transformed in ways both terrifying and wondrous—and only the Justice League is strong enough to face the threats to come...or are they?

The six-issue miniseries Death of Hawkman, written by Marc Andreyko with art by Aaron Lopresti, does not feature the "Rebirth" banner on its cover, but is considered by Andreyko to be "'Rebirth' adjacent". Despite not having the "Rebirth" banner on its cover, the miniseries Mister Miracle was stated to be a part of the Rebirth continuity by writer Tom King.

== Sales ==
By the end of August 2016, all Rebirth titles combined accounted for 12 million units shipped, with 11 issues exceeding 200,000 units shipped, over 60 issues exceeding 100,000 units shipped, and 21 issues having multiple printings.

== Marketing ==
Beginning in January 2017, television commercials aired on AMC, IFC, TBS, TNT, truTV, El Rey Network and Boomerang through February 2017. The commercials promoted the release of the first wave of collected editions, highlighting Batman, The Flash, Green Arrow, Justice League, Suicide Squad, Supergirl, Superman, and Wonder Woman, with three additional commercials promoting Rebirth as a whole. Additionally, DC "is also offering [comic] retailers co-op funds to help pay for ads on local markets, promoting Rebirth with a space for a store tag at the end of the commercial." In February 2017, DC partnered once again with National CineMedia to promote its comics and partner comic shops with pre-movie advertisements. Having worked with National CineMedia for ads during The New 52, DC created 15 and 30 second ads for Rebirth "that comic shops can have their contact info added into," with DC "offering a 50% reimbursement on these ads should a retailer buy them with National CineMedia."

== Collected editions ==
Title	Page count	Material collected	Publication date	ISBN	Ref
A Very DC Rebirth Holiday TP	160	DC Rebirth Holiday Special #1, Batman Annual Vol. 3 #1, Harley Quinn Vol. 3 #10	November 1, 2017	978-1-4012-7605-8	
All-Star Batman Volume 1: My Own Worst Enemy HC	192	All-Star Batman #1–5	April 19, 2017		
All-Star Batman Volume 2: Ends of the Earth HC	144	All-Star Batman #6–9	September 6, 2017		
All-Star Batman Volume 3: The First Ally HC	176	All-Star Batman #10–14	March 14, 2018		
Aquaman Volume 1: The Drowning TP	192	Aquaman: Rebirth #1, Aquaman Vol. 8 #1–6	January 17, 2017		
Aquaman Volume 2: Black Manta Rising TP	212	Aquaman Vol. 8 #7–15	April 12, 2017		
Aquaman Volume 3: Crown of Atlantis TP	216	Aquaman Vol. 8 #16–24	August 30, 2017		
Aquaman Volume 4: Underworld TP	152	Aquaman Vol. 8 #25–30	January 24, 2018	978-1-4012-7542-6	
Batgirl Volume 1: Beyond Burnside TP	144	Batgirl Vol. 5 #1–6	March 22, 2017		
Batgirl Volume 2: Son of Penguin TP	168	Batgirl Vol. 5 #7–11, Batgirl Annual Vol. 5 #1	October 18, 2017		
Batgirl Volume 3: Summer of Lies TP	144	Batgirl Vol. 5 #12–17	March 28, 2018		
Batgirl and the Birds of Prey Volume 1: Who Is Oracle? TP	168	Batgirl and the Birds of Prey: Rebirth #1, Batgirl and the Birds of Prey #1–6	April 5, 2017		
Batgirl and the Birds of Prey Volume 2: Source Code TP	168	Batgirl and the Birds of Prey #7–13	December 6, 2017		
Batman/The Flash: The Button Deluxe Edition HC	96	Batman Vol. 3 #21–22, The Flash Vol. 5 #21–22	October 11, 2017		
Batman: Rebirth Collection Deluxe Edition Book One HC	400	Batman: Rebirth #1, Batman Vol. 3 #1–15	August 30, 2017		
Batman Volume 1: I Am Gotham TP	192	Batman: Rebirth #1, Batman Vol. 3 #1–6	January 11, 2017		
Batman Volume 2: I Am Suicide TP	168	Batman Vol. 3 #9–15	April 12, 2017		
Batman Volume 3: I Am Bane TP	176	Batman Vol. 3 #16–20, #23, #24, Batman Annual Vol. 3 #1	August 30, 2017		
Batman Volume 4: The War of Jokes and Riddles TP	200	Batman Vol. 3 #25-32	December 13, 2017		
Batman Volume 5: The Rules of Engagement TP	160	Batman Vol. 3 #33–37, Batman Annual Vol. 3 #2	April 25, 2018		
Batman Beyond Volume 1: Escaping the Grave TP	144	Batman Beyond: Rebirth #1, Batman Beyond Vol. 7 #1–5	June 28, 2017		
Batman Beyond Volume 2: Rise of the Demon TP	168	Batman Beyond Vol. 7 #6–12	January 10, 2018	978-1-4012-7522-8	
Batman: Detective Comics: The Rebirth Deluxe Edition Book One HC	384	Detective Comics Vol. 934–949	November 1, 2017		
Batman-Detective Comics Volume 1: Rise of the Batmen TP	176	Detective Comics Vol. 1 #934–940	February 1, 2017		
Batman-Detective Comics Volume 2: The Victim Syndicate TP	168	Detective Comics Vol. 1 #943–949	May 10, 2017		
Batman-Detective Comics Volume 3: League of Shadows TP	184	Detective Comics Vol. 1 #950–956	October 4, 2017		
Batman-Detective Comics Volume 4: Deus Ex Machina TP	144	Detective Comics Vol. 1 #957–962	December 13, 2017		
Batman-Detective Comics Volume 5: A Lonely Place of Living TP	144	Detective Comics Vol. 1 #963–968	April 4, 2018		
Batman: Night of the Monster Men HC	152	Batman Vol. 3 #7–8, Nightwing Vol. 4 #5–6, Detective Comics Vol. 1 #941–942	February 22, 2017		
Batwoman Volume 1: The Many Arms of Death TP	168	Batwoman: Rebirth #1, Batwoman Vol. 2 #1–6	November 15, 2017		
Blue Beetle Volume 1: The More Things Change TP	160	Blue Beetle: Rebirth #1, Blue Beetle Vol. 9 #1–6	May 10, 2017		
Blue Beetle Volume 2: Hard Choices TP	168	Blue Beetle Vol. 9 #6–12	December 27, 2017		
Cyborg Volume 1: The Imitation of Life TP	152	Cyborg: Rebirth #1, Cyborg Vol. 2 #1–5	March 22, 2017		
Cyborg Volume 2: Danger in Detroit TP	192	Cyborg Vol. 2 #6–13	August 9, 2017		
DC Universe: Rebirth Omnibus TP	544	Aquaman: Rebirth #1, Batgirl and the Birds of Prey: Rebirth #1, Batman: Rebirth #1, Batman Beyond: Rebirth #1, Blue Beetle: Rebirth #1, Cyborg: Rebirth #1, Deathstroke: Rebirth #1, Green Arrow: Rebirth #1, Green Lanterns: Rebirth #1, Hal Jordan and the Green Lantern Corps: Rebirth #1, Justice League: Rebirth #1, Nightwing: Rebirth #1, Red Hood and the Outlaws: Rebirth #1, Suicide Squad: Rebirth #1, Supergirl: Rebirth #1, Superman: Rebirth #1, Teen Titans: Rebirth #1, The Flash: Rebirth #1, The Hellblazer: Rebirth #1, Titans: Rebirth #1, Wonder Woman: Rebirth #1	December 7, 2016		
DC Universe: Rebirth Omnibus Expanded Edition HC	792	Aquaman: Rebirth #1, Batgirl and the Birds of Prey: Rebirth #1, Batman: Rebirth #1, Batman Beyond: Rebirth #1, Batwoman: Rebirth #1 Blue Beetle: Rebirth #1, Cyborg: Rebirth #1, DC Rebirth Holiday Special #1, Deathstroke: Rebirth #1, Green Arrow: Rebirth #1, Green Lanterns: Rebirth #1, Hal Jordan and the Green Lantern Corps: Rebirth #1, Justice League: Rebirth #1, Justice League of America: Rebirth #1, Justice League of America: The Atom Rebirth #1, Justice League of America: Killer Frost Rebirth #1, Justice League of America: The Ray Rebirth #1, Justice League of America: Vixen Rebirth #1, Nightwing: Rebirth #1, Red Hood and the Outlaws: Rebirth #1, Suicide Squad: Rebirth #1, Supergirl: Rebirth #1, Superman: Rebirth #1, Teen Titans: Rebirth #1, The Flash: Rebirth #1, The Hellblazer: Rebirth #1, Titans: Rebirth #1, Wonder Woman: Rebirth #1	September 13, 2017		
Deathstroke Volume 1: The Professional TP	144	Deathstroke: Rebirth #1, Deathstroke Vol. 4 #1–5	March 8, 2017		
Deathstroke Volume 2: The Gospel of Slade TP	144	Deathstroke Vol. 4 #6–11	July 5, 2017		
Deathstroke Volume 3: Twilight TP	168	Deathstroke Vol. 4 #12–18	October 11, 2017		
Deathstroke Volume 4: Defiance TP	136	Deathstroke Vol. 4 #21–25 and a story from DC Rebirth Holiday Special #1	April 18, 2018		
Green Arrow Volume 1: The Death and Life of Oliver Queen TP	160	Green Arrow: Rebirth #1, Green Arrow Vol. 6 #1–5	January 4, 2017		
Green Arrow Volume 2: Island of Scars TP	144	Green Arrow Vol. 6 #6–11	April 5, 2017		
Green Arrow Volume 3: Emerald Outlaw TP	152	Green Arrow Vol. 6 #12–17	August 2, 2017		
Green Arrow Volume 4: The Rise of Star City TP	200	Green Arrow Vol. 6 #18–25	December 6, 2017		
Green Lanterns Volume 1: Rage Planet TP	168	Green Lanterns: Rebirth #1, Green Lanterns #1–6	January 25, 2017		
Green Lanterns Volume 2: The Phantom Lantern TP	184	Green Lanterns #7–14	April 26, 2017		
Green Lanterns Volume 3: Polarity TP	168	Green Lanterns #15–21	September 13, 2017		
Green Lanterns Volume 4: The First Rings TP	128	Green Lanterns #22–26	December 20, 2017		
Green Lanterns Volume 5: Out of Time TP	144	Green Lanterns #27–32	March 28, 2018		
Hal Jordan and the Green Lantern Corps Volume 1: Sinestro's Law TP	192	Hal Jordan and the Green Lantern Corps: Rebirth #1, Hal Jordan and the Green Lantern Corps #1–7	February 8, 2017		
Hal Jordan and the Green Lantern Corps Volume 2: Bottled Light TP	144	Hal Jordan and the Green Lantern Corps #8–13	May 31, 2017		
Hal Jordan and the Green Lantern Corps Volume 3: The Quest for Hope TP	192	Hal Jordan and the Green Lantern Corps #14–21	August 16, 2017		
Hal Jordan and the Green Lantern Corps Volume 4: Fracture TP	200	Hal Jordan and the Green Lantern Corps #22–29	January 3, 2018	978-1-4012-7519-8	
Harley Quinn: The Rebirth Deluxe Edition Book One HC	304	Harley Quinn Vol. 3 #1–13	September 13, 2017		
Harley Quinn Volume 1: Die Laughing TP	168	Harley Quinn Vol. 3 #1–7	March 15, 2017		
Harley Quinn Volume 2: Joker Loves Harley TP	144	Harley Quinn Vol. 3 #8–13	June 21, 2017		
Harley Quinn Volume 3: Red Meat TP	168	Harley Quinn Vol. 3 #14–16, the lead stories from Harley Quinn Vol. 3 #17–21	September 13, 2017		
Harley Quinn Volume 4: Surprise, Surprise TP	144	Harley Quinn Vol. 3 #22–27, Harley Quinn 25th Anniversary Special #1	January 18, 2018	978-1-4012-7526-6	
Justice League of America: Road to Rebirth TP	128	Justice League of America: Rebirth #1, Justice League of America: The Atom Rebirth #1, Justice League of America: Killer Frost Rebirth #1, Justice League of America: The Ray Rebirth #1, Justice League of America: Vixen Rebirth #1	June 7, 2017		
Justice League of America: The Rebirth Deluxe Edition Book One HC	288	Justice League of America: Rebirth #1, Justice League of America: The Atom Rebirth #1, Justice League of America: Killer Frost Rebirth #1, Justice League of America: The Ray Rebirth #1, Justice League of America: Vixen Rebirth #1, Justice League of America Vol. 5 #1–6	November 15, 2017		
Justice League of America Volume 1: The Extremists TP	168	Justice League of America Vol. 5 #1–6	August 9, 2017		
Justice League of America Volume 2: Curse of the Kingbutcher TP	128	Justice League of America Vol. 5 #7–11	November 8, 2017		
Justice League of America Volume 3: Panic in the Microverse TP	144	Justice League of America Vol. 5 #12–17	March 7, 2018		
Justice League: The Rebirth Collection Deluxe Edition Book One HC	312	Justice League: Rebirth #1, Justice League Vol. 3 #1–11	July 12, 2017		
Justice League: The Rebirth Collection Deluxe Edition Book Two HC	344	Justice League Vol. 3 #12–25	April 11, 2018		
Justice League Volume 1: The Extinction Machines TP	168	Justice League: Rebirth #1, Justice League Vol. 3 #1–5	January 18, 2017		
Justice League Volume 2: Outbreak TP	152	Justice League Vol. 3 #6–11	April 26, 2017		
Justice League Volume 3: Timeless TP	144	Justice League Vol. 3 #14–19	July 12, 2017		
Justice League Volume 4: Endless TP	152	Justice League Vol. 3 #20–25	November 1, 2017		
Justice League Volume 5: Legacy TP	144	Justice League Vol. 3 #26–31	February 28, 2018	978-1-4012-7725-3	
Justice League vs. Suicide Squad HC	312	Justice League vs. Suicide Squad #1–6, Suicide Squad Vol. 5 #8–10, Justice League Vol. 3 #12–13	June 21, 2017		
New Super-Man Volume 1: Made in China TP	144	New Super-Man #1–6	June 21, 2017		
New Super-Man Volume 2: Coming to America TP	144	New Super-Man #7–12	October 4, 2017		
Nightwing: The Rebirth Collection Deluxe Edition Book One HC	384	Nightwing: Rebirth #1, Nightwing Vol. 4 #1–15	October 25, 2017		
Nightwing Volume 1: Better Than Batman TP	176	Nightwing: Rebirth #1, Nightwing Vol. 4 #1–4, 7–8	January 25, 2017		
Nightwing Volume 2: Back to Bludhaven TP	168	Nightwing Vol. 4 #9–15	June 14, 2017		
Nightwing Volume 3: Nightwing Must Die TP	144	Nightwing Vol. 4 #16–21	September 20, 2017		
Nightwing Volume 4: Blockbuster TP	176	Nightwing Vol. 4 #22–28	January 17, 2018	978-1-4012-7533-4	
Nightwing Volume 5: Raptor's Revenge TP	128	Nightwing Vol. 4 #30–34	April 25, 2018		
Red Hood and the Outlaws Volume 1: Dark Trinity TP	168	Red Hood and the Outlaws: Rebirth #1, Red Hood and the Outlaws Vol. 2 #1–6	April 26, 2017		
Red Hood and the Outlaws Volume 2: Who is Artemis? TP	128	Red Hood and the Outlaws Vol. 2 #7–11	October 4, 2017		
Red Hood and the Outlaws Volume 3: Bizarro Reborn TP	208	Red Hood and the Outlaws Vol. 2 #12–18, Red Hood and the Outlaws Annual Vol. 2 #1	April 18, 2018		
Suicide Squad: The Rebirth Collection Deluxe Edition Book One HC	296	Suicide Squad: Rebirth #1, Suicide Squad Vol. 5 #1–8, Harley Quinn and the Suicide Squad April Fool's Special #1	October 18, 2017		
Suicide Squad Volume 1: The Black Vault Part One TP	144	Suicide Squad: Rebirth #1, Suicide Squad Vol. 5 #1–4	March 1, 2017		
Suicide Squad Volume 2: Going Sane TP	144	Suicide Squad Vol. 5 #5–8, Harley Quinn and the Suicide Squad April Fool's Special #1	June 7, 2017		
Suicide Squad Volume 3: Burning Down the House TP	160	Suicide Squad Vol. 5 #11–15, Suicide Squad: War Crimes Special #1	September 6, 2017		
Suicide Squad Volume 4: Earthlings on Fire TP	128	Suicide Squad Vol. 5 #16–20	December 28, 2017		
Suicide Squad Volume 5: Kill Your Darlings TP	128	Suicide Squad Vol. 5 #21–25	April 11, 2018		
Supergirl Volume 1: Reign of the Cyborg Supermen TP	168	Supergirl: Rebirth #1, Supergirl Vol. 7 #1–6	May 17, 2017		
Supergirl Volume 2: Escape from the Phantom Zone TP	144	Supergirl Vol. 7 #7–11, a story from Batgirl Annual Vol. 5 #1	October 25, 2017		
Supergirl Volume 3: Girl of No Tomorrow TP	128	Supergirl Vol. 7 #12–14,Supergirl Annual Vol. 7 #1	April 4, 2018		
Superman Reborn HC	168	Action Comics Vol. 1 #973–976, Superman Vol. 4 #18–19	September 13, 2017		
Superman: The Rebirth Deluxe Collection Book One HC	336	Superman: Rebirth #1, Superman Vol. 4 #1–13	September 27, 2017		
Superman Volume 1: Son of Superman TP	176	Superman: Rebirth #1, Superman Vol. 4 #1–6	January 4, 2017		
Superman Volume 2: Trials of the Super Son TP	168	Superman Vol. 4 #7–13	April 5, 2017		
Superman Volume 3: Multiplicity TP	144	Superman Vol. 4 #14–17, Superman Annual Vol. 4 #1	August 2, 2017		
Superman Volume 4: Black Dawn TP	176	Superman Vol. 4 #20–26	November 29, 2017		
Superman Volume 5: Hopes and Fears TP	176	Superman Vol. 4 #27–32	April 11, 2018		
Superman–Action Comics–The Oz Effect: Deluxe Edition HC	192	Action Comics Vol. 1 #985–992	March 21, 2018	978-1-4012-7738-3	
Superman–Action Comics: The Rebirth Deluxe Collection Book 1 HC	240	Action Comics Vol. 1 #957–966, Justice League Vol. 2 #52	June 28, 2017		
Superman–Action Comics: The Rebirth Deluxe Collection Book Two HC	424	Action Comics Vol. 1 #967–984	February 14, 2018	978-1-4012-7760-4	
Superman–Action Comics Volume 1: Path of Doom TP	144	Action Comics Vol. 1 #957–962	February 15, 2017		
Superman–Action Comics Volume 2: Welcome to the Planet TP	128	Justice League Vol. 2 #52, Action Comics Vol. 1 #963–966	April 19, 2017		
Superman–Action Comics Volume 3: Men of Steel TP	144	Action Comics Vol. 1 #967–972	June 28, 2017		
Superman–Action Comics Volume 4: The New World TP	192	Action Comics Vol. 1 #977–984	November 1, 2017		
Super Sons Volume 1: When I Grow Up TP	128	Super Sons #1–5	October 11, 2017		
Super Sons Volume 2: Planet of the Capes TP	128	Super Sons #6–10	March 7, 2018		
Superwoman Volume 1: Who Killed Superwoman? TP	168	Superwoman #1–7	May 3, 2017		
Superwoman Volume 2: Rediscovery TP	144	Superwoman #8–13	November 29, 2017		
Teen Titans Volume 1: Damian Knows Best TP	144	Teen Titans: Rebirth #1, Teen Titans Vol. 6 #1–5	June 14, 2017		
Teen Titans Volume 2: The Rise of Aqualad TP	128	Teen Titans Vol. 6 #6–7, 9–11	February 28, 2018	978-1-4012-7504-4	
The Flash: The Rebirth Collection Deluxe Edition Book One HC	304	The Flash: Rebirth #1, The Flash Vol. 5 #1–13	July 26, 2017		
The Flash: The Rebirth Collection Deluxe Edition Book Two HC	344	The Flash Vol. 5 #14–27	April 25, 2018		
The Flash Volume 1: Lightning Strikes Twice TP	216	The Flash: Rebirth #1, The Flash Vol. 5 #1–8	January 18, 2017		
The Flash Volume 2: Speed of Darkness TP	128	The Flash Vol. 5 #9–13	May 17, 2017		
The Flash Volume 3: Rogues Reloaded TP	144	The Flash Vol. 5 #14–20	July 26, 2017		
The Flash Volume 4: Running Scared TP	144	The Flash Vol. 5 #23–27	November 15, 2017		
The Flash Volume 5: Negative TP	128	The Flash Vol. 5 #28–32	March 21, 2018		
The Hellblazer Volume 1: The Poison Truth TP	160	The Hellblazer: Rebirth #1, The Hellblazer #1–6	March 29, 2017		
The Hellblazer Volume 2: The Smokeless Fire TP	144	The Hellblazer #7–12	October 25, 2017		
The Hellblazer Volume 3: The Inspiration Game TP	144	The Hellblazer #13–18	March 7, 2018		
Titans: The Lazarus Contract HC	136	Titans Vol. 3 #11, Teen Titans Vol. 6 #8, Deathstroke Vol. 4 #19–20, Teen Titans: The Lazarus Contract Special #1	November 8, 2017		
Titans Volume 1: The Return of Wally West TP	168	Titans: Rebirth #1, Titans Vol. 3 #1–6	March 1, 2017		
Titans Volume 2: Made in Manhattan TP	152	Titans Vol. 3 #7–10, Titans Annual Vol. 3 #1, stories from DC Rebirth Holiday Special #1	September 20, 2017		
Titans Volume 3: A Judas Among Us TP	168	Titans Vol. 3 #12–18	February 14, 2018	978-1-4012-7504-4	
Trinity Volume 1: Better Together HC	144	Trinity Vol. 2 #1–6	June 7, 2017		
Trinity Volume 2: Dead Space HC	128	Trinity Vol. 2 #7–11	December 13, 2017		
Wonder Woman: The Rebirth Collection Deluxe Edition Book One HC	360	Wonder Woman: Rebirth #1, Wonder Woman Vol. 5 #1–14	October 4, 2017		
Wonder Woman Volume 1: The Lies TP	176	Wonder Woman: Rebirth #1, Wonder Woman Vol. 5 #1, 3, 5, 7, 9, 11	February 22, 2017		
Wonder Woman Volume 2: Year One TP	168	Wonder Woman Vol. 5 #2, 4, 6, 8, 10, 12, 14	May 3, 2017		
Wonder Woman Volume 3: The Truth TP	176	Wonder Woman Vol. 5 #13, 15, 17, 19, 21, 23, 25	August 23, 2017		
Wonder Woman Volume 4: Godwatch TP	144	Wonder Woman Vol. 5 #16, 18, 20, 22, 24, a story from Wonder Woman Annual Vol. 5 #1	November 15, 2017		
Wonder Woman and Justice League Dark: The Witching Hour		Wonder Woman (vol. 5) #56-57; Wonder Woman and Justice League Dark: The Witching Hour #1; Justice League Dark (vol. 2) #4 and Justice League Dark and Wonder Woman: The Witching Hour #1	2019	978-1401290733	

== See also ==
- Infinite Frontier, the March 2021 relaunch of DC Comics that succeeded Rebirth

== Notes ==
1. For additional creative team information, see each title's individual article.
