= Tétreault =

Tétreault is a surname. Notable people with the surname include:

- Delia Tetreault (born 1865), Canadian religious community founder from Quebec
- Hélène Tétreault (born 1958), Canadian handball player
- J.-Eugène Tétreault (born 1884), Canadian politician
- Jackson Tetreault (born 1996), American baseball player
- Jacques Tétreault (born 1929), Canadian politician
- Martin Tétreault (born 1958), musician and artist
- Stéphane Tétreault (born 1993), Canadian cellist
- Tim Tetreault (born 1970), American skier

== Toponyms ==
Canada (Québec)

- Mont Tétreault, located in Lac-aux-Sables, in Mauricie
- Quartier Tétreaultville, located in sector Mercier-Est, in Montréal
- Bessette-Tétreault, (agricultural stream), Richelieu (city), Rouville Regional County Municipality, Montérégie
- Parc Délia-Tétreault, located on the shore, in Laval
- Place commémorative "Délia-Tétreault", in Montréal (city) (sector Outremont)
- Arthur-Tétreault, (agricultural stream), Acton Vale, Montérégie
- Arthur-Tétreault, Saint-Pie (city), Les Maskoutains Regional County Municipality, Montérégie
- Ruisseau Léonide-Tétreault, Saint-Jean-Baptiste (Municipality), La Vallée-du-Richelieu Regional County Municipality, Montérégie

== See also ==
- Tétrault
- Tétreault-Gadoury v. Canada (Employment and Immigration Commission), leading Supreme Court of Canada decision

- Tetrel
- Terrehault
- Tetrael
- Tetrayl
- Tetrel
- Tetryl
- Tatro
