= Douglas/Kwantlen Faculty Assn v Douglas College =

- Supreme Court of Canada

Hearing: May 18, 19, 1989 Judgment: December 6, 1990
- Citations: [1990] 3 S.C.R. 570
- Prior history: on appeal from BC Court of Appeal
- Ruling: Faculty appeal dismissed

Court membership
- Chief Justice: Brian Dickson; Puisne Justices: Antonio Lamer, Bertha Wilson, Gérard La Forest, Claire L'Heureux-Dubé, John Sopinka, Charles Gonthier, Peter Cory, Beverley McLachlin

Reasons given
- Majority: La Forest J., joined by Dickson C.J. and Gonthier JJ.
- Concurrence: Wilson J., joined by L'Heureux‑Dubé J.
- Concurrence: Sopinka J.
- Concurrence: Cory J.

Douglas/Kwantlen Faculty Assn v Douglas College, [1990] 3 S.C.R. 570 is a leading Supreme Court of Canada decision regarding the jurisdiction of an administrative tribunal.

== Background ==
Douglas College is a post-secondary school operated by the province of British Columbia as a Crown corporation under the College and Institute Act. The school's collective agreement included a provision for mandatory retirement at age 65. Two professors challenged this provision before the labour arbitration tribunal, claiming it violated the equality rights guarantee under section 15(1) of the Canadian Charter of Rights and Freedoms.

The professors argued that the college constituted a public institution and therefore was subject to the Charter, and that the collective agreement constituted "law" within meaning of the Charter.

The arbitrator agreed and found that the law violated section 15(1) of the Charter. The school appealed the decision on the grounds that the tribunal did not have jurisdiction to determine the constitutional issue. The British Columbia Court of Appeal found that the tribunal had jurisdiction and upheld the decision of the tribunal. The school appealed the decision in the Supreme Court of Canada.

The issues before the Supreme Court were:

1. whether the Charter applied to the collective agreement;
2. whether the retirement provision was "law" as used in s. 15(1) of the Charter;
3. whether the tribunal appointed to resolve labour grievances was a "court of competent jurisdiction" under s. 24(1) of the Charter so that it could determine the constitutionality of the statutory provision; and
4. whether the tribunal had jurisdiction to hear and determine such a grievance.

== Opinion of the Court ==
Justice La Forest, writing for the majority, dismissed the appeal by the college. The majority held that although a tribunal has the power to treat any invalid law that it may be asked to apply as having no force or effect, it may not necessarily be able to apply the Charter or grant a remedy under section 24(1) of the Charter. A tribunal only has power to the extent that it has been conferred to it by law.

== See also ==
- List of Supreme Court of Canada cases (Lamer Court)
- Cuddy Chicks Ltd. v. Ontario (Labour Relations Board), [1991] 2 S.C.R. 5
- Tétreault-Gadoury v. Canada (Employment and Immigration Commission), [1991] 2 S.C.R. 22
