= Tétrault =

Tétrault or Tetrault may refer to:

== Persons ==
- Daniel Tetrault (born 1979), Canadian ice hockey player
- Nicolas Tétrault, Canadian politician from Quebec
- Oza Tétrault (1908–1995), Canadian politician from Quebec

== Toponyms ==
Canada (Québec)

- Boulevard Tétrault, Val-d'Or (city), La Vallée-de-l'Or Regional County Municipality, Abitibi-Témiscamingue.
- Tétrault lake, Saint-Zénon (Municipality), Matawinie Regional County Municipality, Lanaudière.
- Tétrault street, Brossard (city), Longueuil, Montérégie.
- Tétrault street, Saint-Mathias-sur-Richelieu (Municipality), Rouville Regional County Municipality, Montérégie.
- Tétrault street, McMasterville (Municipality), La Vallée-du-Richelieu Regional County Municipality, Montérégie.
- Tétrault street, sector LaSalle, Quebec, Montréal.
- Tétrault street, sector Saint-Laurent, Montréal.
- Tétrault stream, Bromont (city), Brome-Missisquoi Regional County Municipality, Montérégie.
- Tétrault stream, Saint-Barnarbé-Sud (Municipality), Les Maskoutains Regional County Municipality, Montérégie.
- Chemin du Lac-Tétrault (road), Saint-Zénon (Municipality), Matawinie Regional County Municipality, Lanaudière.
- Stream of discharge Tétrault-Blanchet, Saint-Charles-sur-Richelieu (Municipality), La Vallée-du-Richelieu Regional County Municipality, Montérégie.
- Tétrault-Breault stream, Dunham (city), Brome-Missisquoi Regional County Municipality, Montérégie.

Elsewhere

- Tetrault Lake, near Eureka, Montana.
- Tetrault Woods State Forest, North Dakota

== See also ==
- Tétreault
- Thériault
