= DC K.O. =

2025 American comic book story

- Publisher: DC Comics
- Publication date: October 2025 – March 2026
Title(s)
See below
- Main characters: Superman; Darkseid; Batman; Wonder Woman; Justice League; Titans; Lex Luthor; Joker

Creative team
- Writer(s): Scott Snyder; Joshua Williamson
- Artists: Xermanico; Javier Fernandez
- Penciller: Javier Fernandez
- Inker: Xermanico
- Letterer: Hassan Otsmane-Elhaou
- Colorist: Alejandro Sánchez
- Editor: Paul Kaminski

DC K.O. (Note: K.O. stands for "King Omega" instead of "Knock-Out".) is an American comic book crossover storyline published by DC Comics as part of the DC All In initiative. The storyline is mainly written by Scott Snyder as well as Joshua Williamson, with art mainly by Javier Fernandez. The story consists of the Justice League trying to defeat Darkseid who wants to transform Earth after creating the Absolute Universe. The storyline received critical acclaim from critics who praised the scope of the story, the action, and Scott Snyder's writing.

== Publication history ==
The "DC K.O." storyline was revealed in July 2025 by DC Comics when it was stated that Scott Snyder will be returning to DC Comics after a 5-year hiatus. Snyder wrote the main issues, while Joshua Williamson wrote the tie-in issues for the storyline; both worked together on DC All in Special #1. Snyder has stated that "K.O." does not stand for Knock-out, but rather King Omega.

The storyline also features guest third-party characters like Homelander (The Boys), Sub-Zero (Mortal Kombat), Annabelle (The Conjuring), Red Sonja, Sabrina Spellman (Sabrina the Teenage Witch), Vampirella and Samantha Strong (Beneath the Trees Where Nobody Sees).

== Premise ==
Various heroes and villains compete in a tournament so that the winner can obtain enough energy to confront Darkseid, who has returned to the DC Universe after creating and absorbing power from the Absolute Universe.

== Plot ==
=== Lead-up ===
After the heroes stop Amanda Waller, (Note: As depicted in the 2024 storyline "Absolute Power") they rebuild the new Justice League Watchtower, and Booster Gold is offered membership by Superman. Just then, Darkseid arrives, having bonded with the Spectre. With the help of magical beings, Superman repels Darkseid, but Darkseid thanks him before disappearing, leaving an unstable rift. Mister Terrific reveals Darkseid retreated to a world called Alpha World, which only time-travelers can travel to safely. Booster Gold offers to travel there, but is captured by Darkseid's corrupt Legion of Super-Heroes.

It is revealed that when the main universe was separated from the multiverse, Darkseid felt a surge of power. During the confrontation with Spectre, Spectre tells Darkseid that Superman is the embodiment of life, while Darkseid is the opposite. As life expanded, Darkseid's presence spread out, causing him to feel restless and even hungrier for power. After bonding with Spectre using the Miracle Machine, he traveled to another universe and corrupted it using his influence.

Gorilla Grodd senses Darkseid's rift and tries to use it, but the Justice League with their alternate variants defeat Grodd. Superman encounters the Time Trapper, who wants Superman to join with him to rule eternity, but Superman rejects. Time Trapper travels back to his world, but is captured by Darkseid's Legion, and is saved by the World Forger. Superman manages to free Booster Gold (who is infused with Chronal and Omega energy) with the help of Superboy-Prime, and tells the League to come help them. Time Trapper tries to convince Booster Gold to leave, but after traveling to Time Trapper's world with Wally West, he decides to work with Superman.

=== Main plot ===
The Quantum Quorum (Time Trapper, Gorilla Grodd, World Forger, and Booster Gold) want to change the timeline (similar to The New 52), but the Justice League decline that offer. Time Trapper explains that Apokolips' heart runs on Omega Energy, and Darkseid has placed its heart on a different earth, creating it in his own image, becoming King Omega. Darkseid has planned to do the same thing to the current Earth, but Batman offers to create their own King Omega to fight back using Booster Gold. Superman objects at first, but after persuasion from Wonder Woman and Batman, he relents. For one week, the heroes secure all the villains, convince the world to work together and build mega arks for evacuation. They eventually head to the Skartaris Nexus (passageway to Center of Earth) to participate in the tournament. During the first round, the villains arrive. Batman is seemingly killed by Joker, and Darkseid is revealed to have secretly been possessing Booster Gold.

In the second round, the goal is to grab 16 cosmic items that include power rings, Blue Beetle's Scarab, the Lasso of Truth, a mysterious power and more before time runs out. Superman goes after Lex Luthor who has his memories returned while the heroes and villains fight each other. During their conflict, Luthor reveals he hates Superman because he has done so little, and cuts off his hand while shooting kryptonite to incapacitate him. Starro sends multiple copies of himself to cause chaos in the battlefield, while Wonder Woman grabs Mjölnir to free everyone from Starro's control. Carol Ferris confronts Luthor, but he steals a Black Lantern ring to revive the elder gods and kill everyone. Superman remembers the rules of following the example of Darkseid and they should be rewarded, and kills himself using the kryptonite shard, before gaining access to the Omega Sanction and defeating all the villains before moving on to the next round.

During the preliminary matches, the Darkseid-possessed Booster Gold reveals himself and defeats the members of the Quantum Quorum. Grodd tries to warn Luthor of the deceit as Earth is transformed into a new Apokolips.

As the Heart of Apokolips shows the eight finalists a vision of the world each would create with its power, the third round commences, with the heart allowing the contestants to bring the defeated back into the arena to aid those still participating. With Superman, Wonder Woman, Lex Luthor and Joker advancing, they get teleported to Earth, with them realizing that it has been transformed by Darkseid. The Heart explains to the remaining fighters that they are not Earth's champions anymore, facing the corrupted versions of Absolute Batman, Wonder Woman and Superman, fighting for Darkseid.

With the Final Four taking on the Absolute Trinity and the Darkseid-possessed Booster Gold, Joker switches sides to join under the thrall of Darkseid in the fight. However, Batman arrives and eliminates Joker, taking his place. Meanwhile Superman punches the Darkseid-possessed Booster Gold, loosening the control of their Absolute counterparts, which they agree to help. However, Lex Luthor explains that he let them go as Darkseid decided that he does not need his puppets anymore, proceeding to fight them in his true form. Decimating the contestants and their Absolute counterparts, only Luthor and Superman remain together going up against Darkseid. Luthor betrays Superman, winning the tournament and becoming King Omega.

As Lex Luthor prepares to fight Darkseid, Time Trapper learns reveals that he was not meant to destroy Superman, but save him for this moment. Time Trapper channels the Alpha and Omega energy inside of him to bring him back. This causes Superman to replace Luthor, and he proceeds to fight Darkseid. During the fight, Superman frees all his heroes who were killed during the tournament, imbuing them with Alpha energy. In the end, Superman heals the universe before leaving. Booster Gold is freed from Darkseid's control and wants to find Superman, Superboy-Prime takes over Superman's place in Metropolis, and Darkseid swears vengeance, via a "Crisis of Absolute Proportions." (Note: The "Crisis of Absolute Proportions" is referencing both DC's long line of Crisis Events, such as Crisis on Infinite Earths, and the Absolute Universe imprint of DC Comics.)

=== Tie-in stories ===
In addition to the main DC K.O. and DC K.O. Knightfight series, several other series across DC's current line-up contain stories that tie directly into the main event.

Titans details the Titans remaining on Earth during the tournament to evacuate the human population, eventually rehoming much of Earth's population to Gemworld. This story arc ran from issue #28 to issue #32.

Aquaman Volume 9 #11 serves as a prelude to the main DC K.O. storyline, about Aquaman learning of a connection between Darkseid and the Dark Tide. Issues of Aquaman tied into DC K.O. until issue #14.

Superman Volume 6 involves Superman, and Lois Lane discovering secrets about Darkseid that relate to the end of Krypton. Superboy-Prime returns to save Lois from Darkseid's Legion, and convinces Time Trapper to help Superman. This story arc ran from issue #31 to issue #35.

The Flash Volume 6 contains a tie-in story with Wally West attempting to stop a time-traveling Impulse from destroying the flow of time. In the process, he confronts Darkseid's Legion, who have traveled back in time to stop Barry Allen from becoming the Flash. This storyline ran from issue #26 to issue #30.

Justice League Unlimited Volume 2 has Mister Terrific and several superheroes who were displaced in time during the We are Yesterday storyline journeying to hell to uncover the origin of a signal from one of his devices, which originated from the Earth's core. This story arc concluded with issue #16.

Additionally, several one-shots were published relating to the DC K.O. event, including several "All Fight Month" issues in December, DC K.O. Green Lantern Galactic Slam and DC K.O. The Kids Are All Fight in January, and DC K.O. Boss Battle in February. The latter comic contains several crossover characters from other franchises, including Homelander from The Boys, Sub-Zero from Mortal Kombat, and Red Sonja.

== Titles involved ==
=== Prelude ===
- Justice League Unlimited #10–11
- Superman (vol. 6) #28–30
- Titans (vol. 4) #27
- Justice League: The Omega Act #1

=== Main series ===
- DC K.O. #1–5
- DC K.O.: Knightfight #1–4

=== One-shots ===
- DC K.O.: Boss Battle
- DC K.O.: Green Lantern Galactic Slam
- DC K.O.: Harley Quinn vs. Zatanna
- DC K.O.: The Joker vs. Red Hood
- DC K.O.: The Kids are All Fight Special
- DC K.O.: Superman vs. Captain Atom
- DC K.O.: Wonder Woman vs. Lobo

=== Tie-ins ===
- Aquaman (vol. 9) #11–14
- The Flash (vol. 6) #26–30
- Justice League Unlimited (vol. 2) #12–16
- Superman (vol. 6) #31–35
- Titans (vol. 4) #28–32

== Critical reception ==
According to Comic Book RoundUp, the main storyline received an average rating of 8.3 out of 10 based on 87 reviews.
