= Players (2022 TV series) =

American mockumentary television series

- Genre: Comedy drama; Mockumentary; Satire
- Created by: Dan Perrault; Tony Yacenda
- Starring: Misha Brooks; Da’Jour Jones; Ely Henry
- Country of origin: United States
- Original language: English
- No. of seasons: 1
- No. of episodes: 10

Production
- Executive producers: Tony Yacenda; Dan Perrault; Joe Farrell; Mike Farah; Jim Ziegler; Tim McAuliffe; Ari Lubet; Todd Sellers
- Running time: 28–35 minutes
- Production companies: Riot Games; Brillstein Entertainment Partners; 3 Arts Entertainment; Funny Or Die; CBS Studios

Original release
- Network: Paramount+
- Release: June 16 – July 28, 2022

Players is an American mockumentary television series created by Dan Perrault and Tony Yacenda, that premiered on June 16, 2022, on Paramount+. The series is a parody of sports documentaries, and follows Fugitive Gaming, a fictional pro League of Legends esports team.

== Cast and characters ==
=== Main ===
- Misha Brooks as Creamcheese, Fugitive's 27-year-old veteran player
- Da’Jour Jones as Organizm, Fugitive's 17-year old gaming prodigy
- Ely Henry as Kyle Braxton, Fugitive's coach, and Creamcheese's closest friend

=== Recurring ===
- Holly Chou as April Braxton
- Youngbin Chung as Nightfall
- Noh Dong-Hyeon as BAP
- Michael Ahn as Bucket
- Moses Storm as Guru
- Alexa Mansour as Emma 'Emmanence' Resnick
- Luke Tennie as Rudy Elmore Jr.
- Matt Shively as Frugger
- Stephen Schneider as Nathan Resnick
- Peter Thurnwald as Foresight
- Miles Mussenden as Rudy Elmore Sr.
- Arischa Conner as Simone Elmore
- Dan Perrault as Paul 'Bignpaul' Gilberstadt
- Ryan O'Flanagan as Chris McManus
- Christopher Gilstrap as PuttPutt

== Episodes ==
No.	Title	Directed by	Written by	Original release date
1	"Creamcheese"	Tony Yacenda	Dan Perrault & Tony Yacenda	June 16, 2022
Creamcheese, the star player and one of the founders of Fugitive Gaming, has not managed to win the championship. The team hires Organizm, a young streamer who has been very successful, is signed to the Fugitive Gaming's development team. Creamcheese becomes jealous of the amount of attention that Organizm receives, and becomes furious when Organizm replaces long-time teammate, Frugger. At their first competition, Organizm goes against Creamcheese's guidance and almost wins, generating a lot of interest despite their loss. Organizm leaves a voicemail for Creamcheese, telling him that he will eventually replace him and become the best player.
2	"Organizm"	Tony Yacenda	Tim McAuliffe	June 16, 2022
Organizm grew up in a family where his father and brother played college basketball, and his family were not supportive of his gaming hobby. Despite this, Organizm bought himself a computer and became a more successful online player. He gained notoriety when he repeatedly defeated a former professional player in a streamed match, and left the comment "It's okay, I still think you're a good player." After watching Fugitive Gaming, he decided he wanted to join it. In his second match, he again defies Creamcheese and makes a controversial choice. Organizm wins the games, causing Creamcheese to storm off before the game is over. Despite the team's victory, Creamcheese insists that Organizm needs to be removed. Organizm stays with the team, and Creamcheese chooses to leave Fugitive Gaming.
3	"Braxton"	Tony Yacenda	Kevin McManus & Matthew McManus	June 16, 2022
Creamcheese and Frugger leave Fugitive Gaming, leaving Creamcheese's spot to be filled by a development player, Cronklyn. Despite Organizm's best effort, the team loses. Creamcheese tries to reunite with Foresight, and old Fugitive Gaming teammate who plays for another team, but is rejected. Braxton wants to get Creamcheese back to his team, and attempts to convince Organizm for play for Academy, their development team. Organizm discusses the team change with Emma Resnick, the daughter of the team president, Nathan Resnick. Braxton convinces Creamcheese to return to Fugitive Gaming.
4	"Ownership"	Tony Yacenda	Mark Stasenko	June 16, 2022
A review of Fugitive Gaming's history shows when the team turned professional, and was acquired by Liberty Media Group, under control of Nathan Resnick. Upset with Resnick over the performance of the Sacramento Kings, which he also leads, Liberty Media fires him. Fugitive Gaming continues to lose, culminating in a loss that Creamcheese blames on Organizm, but the rest of the team blames on Creamcheese. Under Organizm, Fugitive Gaming improves, despite frustrations from Creamcheese. The team leaves the house for the mid-season break, but Creamcheese and Organizm remain behind.
5	"Guru"	Tony Yacenda	Natasha Kanury	June 23, 2022
April becomes the interim head of Fugitive Gaming, and announces that Frugger and Bucket will be released, which upsets Creamcheese. During an interview, Creamcheese publicly blames Organizm for their losses. In retaliation, Organizm appears on the Never Lost podcast, which is hosted by game streamer and former member of Fugitive Gaming, Guru. It is revealed that after Fugitive Gaming's first win, Guru surprised the rest of the team and announced his retirement; he created a gaming stream and lifestyle brand, and has become more financially successful than the professional gamers. He encourages Organizm to consider leaving Fugitive Gaming and becoming a streamer as well. At a party, Creamcheese discussed retirement with Foresight, and says that he never plans to retire. A drunk Creamcheese confronts Guru for leaving the team, and pleads with Organizm to begin working with him as a teammate.
6	"Nightfall"	Tony Yacenda	Kristina Woo	June 30, 2022
After the mid-season break, Fugitive Gaming wins several matches, mostly because of the player Nightfall. He had been brought to the team from a South Korean league to replace Guru. Nightfall was initially criticized, but was publicly supported by Creamcheese and became a respected player. A potential buyer for the team, Julie, is brought to see a match; the players like her because she is a fan of the sport. Organizm makes the wrong decision during a match and is chastised by Creamcheese; he is upset after the match, despite their win. Nightfall meets with him and pleads with him to respect Creamcheese's leadership. Fugitive Gaming proceeds to win their next match, and qualify for the playoffs.
7	"Playoffs"	Tony Yacenda	Tim McAuliffe & Nguyen Le	July 7, 2022
Fugitive Gaming easily wins in the first rounds of the playoffs, and Creamcheese leaves to attend his high school reunion. He hopes to reunite with Morgan, his ex-girlfriend that he dated in high school and again shortly after becoming a professional player. He is upset when she is not there, and he meets up with his old friends. Creamcheese becomes upset because his classmates are more excited for someone who lost weight instead of a professional gamer. He returns home, and plays a game with Organizm.
8	"Philadelphia"	Tony Yacenda	Michael Orton-Toliver	July 14, 2022
Fugitive Gaming travels to Philadelphia for the LCS Championship. Organizm is originally from Philadelphia, and becomes frustrated that his brother has set up so many sponsorship meetings, and his family is only interested because he is successful. Fugitive Gaming wins and will go to the LCS finals. Organizm yells at his family and storms off.
9	"Finals"	Tony Yacenda	Mark Stasenko	July 21, 2022
Fugitive Gaming is set to play TSM, Foresight's team, in the LCS finals. Creamcheese has historically choked in the LCS finals, causing concern that he will do it again. Fugitive Gaming has two wins, but TSM proceeds to tie the series.
10	"Yuumi"	Tony Yacenda	Dan Perrault & Tony Yacenda	July 28, 2022
For the final match, Creamcheese selects Yuumi as his champion, which largely means that his success is tied to how well Organizm does. Fugitive Gaming wins the LCS championship, and leaves for South Korea to compete in the world championship. In their practice scrimmages, Fugitive Gaming does not do well on the Korean servers. Organizm becomes frustrated, as he feels that the team has accepted they will not win at the world championship. As expected, the team loses. Organizm chooses to leave Fugitive Gaming and remain in Korea with Guru to become the top-ranked player. The rest of Fugitive Gaming returns to Los Angeles; after a party, Creamcheese watches a game stream from Organizm.

== Production ==
In August 2021, it was announced that Paramount+ had picked up a new comedic docu-style series that will explore the world of esports, titled Players. The show is created by American Vandal co-creators, Tony Yacenda and Dan Perrault, both of whom serve as executive producers, with the former directing. CBS Studios produces the series, in association with, Funny or Die, Riot Games, 3 Arts Entertainment and Brillstein Entertainment Partners.

After coming off from American Vandal, Yacenda and Perrault sought to do another mockumentary style show. They got the idea for Players after doing research on the world of esports. Sport docuseries like The Last Dance, Cheer and Formula 1: Drive to Survive were inspirations for the show. The creators also looked at the narrative drama The Queen's Gambit as an example of how to depict a complicated game like chess for viewers who may not know the rules. In addition to having people from the League community in the writers room, producers at Riot Games would fact-check the scripts, in order to keep the show authentic to real life esports.

On February 1, 2023, the series was removed from Paramount+.

== Release ==
The first four episodes were released on June 16, 2022, with subsequent episodes released weekly until July 28, 2022. The first season consisted of ten episodes.

In December 2022, Funny or Die released the entire series for free on their YouTube channel.

== Reception ==
On the review aggregator website Rotten Tomatoes, 94% of 17 critics' reviews are positive, with an average rating of 8.1/10. The website's consensus reads: "Familiarity with League of Legends will definitely help viewers connect better with Players satirical jabs, but this e-sports comedy reaffirms Dan Perrault and Tony Yacenda's knack for spoofing documentary conventions with amusing results." On Metacritic, the series has a weighted average score of 80 out of 100, based on reviews from 10 critics, indicating "generally favorable reviews".
