= The People v. Gorilla Grodd =

Upcoming DC Studios television series

- Genre: Mockumentary; Crime comedy; Action comedy; Superhero
- Created by: Dan Perrault; Tony Yacenda
- Based on: Characters from DC
- Showrunners: Dan Perrault; Tony Yacenda
- Directed by: Tony Yacenda
- Starring: Skyler Gisondo; Jimmy Tatro; Beck Bennett; Mikaela Hoover; Wendell Pierce; Mary Holland; Eduardo Franco; Arian Moayed; Dan Perrault; Andrew Leeds; Tim Baltz
- Country of origin: United States
- Original language: English

Production
- Executive producers: James Gunn; Peter Safran; Dan Perrault; Tony Yacenda
- Production locations: Atlanta, Georgia
- Running time: 30 minutes
- Production companies: DC Studios; Warner Bros. Television

Original release
- Network: HBO Max

Related
- DCU TV series

The People v. Gorilla Grodd is an upcoming American mockumentary crime comedy superhero television series created by Dan Perrault and Tony Yacenda for HBO Max. Based on DC Comics featuring the characters Jimmy Olsen and Gorilla Grodd, it is intended to be part of the DC Universe (DCU) and a spin-off from the film Superman (2025). It features Olsen hosting a true crime docuseries alongside other Daily Planet reporters, who investigate whether Grodd was wrongfully convicted of murdering his father, the king of Gorilla City. It is produced by DC Studios and Warner Bros. Television, with Perrault and Yacenda serving as showrunners.

Skyler Gisondo reprises his role as Jimmy Olsen, starring alongside Jimmy Tatro as Grodd, Beck Bennett, Mikaela Hoover, Wendell Pierce, Mary Holland, Eduardo Franco, Arian Moayed, Perrault, Andrew Leeds, and Tim Baltz. A series featuring Olsen was reported to be in development in July 2025, following the release of Superman, and was announced in November with Perrault, Yacenda, and Gisondo's involvement, along with the first season's focus on Gorilla Grodd. Additional cast members, including Tatro, joined ahead of a formal series order in late August, when Yacenda was confirmed to direct the eight half-hour-long episodes. Filming took place in Atlanta, Georgia, from early September to late October.

The People v. Gorilla Grodd is expected to be released later in 2027.

== Premise ==
The People v. Gorilla Grodd is presented as a true crime docuseries hosted by the Daily Planet reporter Jimmy Olsen. It follows Olsen and other Daily Planet reporters as they investigate whether the superintelligent ape Gorilla Grodd was wrongfully convicted of murdering his father, the king of Gorilla City, and attempt to reopen the case.

== Cast and characters ==
- Skyler Gisondo as Jimmy Olsen:
  An ambitious young reporter for the Daily Planet who hosts the true crime docuseries The People v. Gorilla Grodd. Gisondo felt Jimmy headlining a series allowed him to be more intense, "off-the-wall", and "take bigger swings" than his smaller role in the first DC Universe (DCU) film Superman (2025).
- Jimmy Tatro as Gorilla Grodd:
  A superintelligent ape who gained psychic abilities after encountering an alien spaceship and seeks to rule the simian and human worlds. In the series, Grodd was convicted of murdering his father, the king of Gorilla City, and is incarcerated at Stryker's Island.
- Beck Bennett as Steve Lombard: A reporter at the Daily Planet and a producer of Olsen's docuseries
- Mikaela Hoover as Cat Grant: A columnist at the Daily Planet and a producer of Olsen's docuseries
- Wendell Pierce as Perry White: The editor-in-chief of the Daily Planet and the supervising producer of Olsen's docuseries
- Mary Holland as Sandra

Additionally, Sara Gilbert has been cast as a journalist, while Eduardo Franco, Arian Moayed, Dan Perrault, Andrew Leeds, and Tim Baltz have been cast in undisclosed roles.

== Episodes ==
No.	Title	Directed by	Written by	Original release date
1	"Pilot"	Tony Yacenda	Dan Perrault & Tony Yacenda	TBA
2	TBA	Tony Yacenda	Nina Luckshmi Mohan & Mark Stasenko	TBA
3	TBA	Tony Yacenda	Zeke Nicholson	TBA
4	TBA	Tony Yacenda	Kevin McManus & Matthew McManus	TBA
5	TBA	Tony Yacenda	Jamiesen Borak & Rachel Hein	TBA
6	TBA	Tony Yacenda	Taylor Santiago Berger	TBA
7	TBA	Tony Yacenda	Mackenzie Sammeth & Mark Stasenko	TBA
8	TBA	Tony Yacenda	Dan Perrault & Tony Yacenda	TBA

== Production ==
=== Development ===
Following the release of Superman, the first film in the DC Universe (DCU), in July 2025, The Wall Street Journal reported that DC Studios co-CEO James Gunn—who wrote and directed Superman—was considering making spin-off television series based on supporting characters from the film, such as Edi Gathegi's Michael Holt / Mister Terrific and Skyler Gisondo's Jimmy Olsen. Gisondo was expected to return for his own series on the streaming service HBO Max, which would include the comic book villain Gorilla Grodd; Grodd previously made a cameo appearance in the first season of the DCU animated series Creature Commandos (2024–25).

In November 2025, Dan Perrault and Tony Yacenda were revealed as the writers, executive producers, and showrunners of the mockumentary series, presented as a true crime docuseries hosted by Olsen. It follows Olsen and other Daily Planet reporters as they investigate cases involving supervillains, focusing on Grodd in the first season. Gunn and Peter Safran were attached as executive producers for DC Studios, with Warner Bros. Television also producing, and DC Studios executive Galen Vaisman overseeing the production. The series was reportedly titled DC Crime, but Gunn debunked that shortly after, later stating that it had never been referred to under this title. Perrault said in March 2026 that they were deliberating various titles; one of these potential titles was reported to be American Villain. In June, Gunn described the series as focusing on both Olsen and Grodd, which he clarified was its focus since he and Safran first pitched it, along with fellow DCU series Lanterns (2026–present), to Warner Bros. Discovery before they started working at DC Studios.

External image
- An in-universe Daily Planet press release announcing The People v. Gorilla Grodd, released with the official series order – via HBO Max Orders New Comedy Series The People v. Gorilla Grodd (Archived August 21, 2026, at the Wayback Machine)

The series, titled The People v. Gorilla Grodd, received a formal greenlight and straight-to-series order from HBO Max in late August. It was set to consist of eight half-hour episodes directed by Yacenda and focus on Olsen and his fellow reporters investigating whether Grodd was wrongfully convicted of murdering his father, the king of Gorilla City. Gunn and Safran were interested in further exploring the Daily Planet characters following their work on Superman and intended for the series to explore the "darker and funnier" parts of the DCU through the criminal justice system in Metropolis. Perrault and Yacenda wanted to make it "less like an entry into the DCU and more like an artifact from it". Gunn described it as DC Studios's "first foray into the true crime genre" and shared an in-universe Daily Planet press release announcing the documentary series. Gisondo believed the series took a different approach to the superhero genre and universe while still having major stakes. He felt Perrault and Yacenda's work on the Netflix mockumentary series American Vandal (2017–18) made them uniquely equipped for The People v. Gorilla Grodd, while Wesley Stenzel at Entertainment Weekly opined that the combination of the true crime and comedy genres made sense and complemented American Vandal. The People v. Gorilla Grodd is primarily set after the events of the DCU film Man of Tomorrow (2027), with various other time periods also depicted.

=== Writing ===
In addition to Perrault and Yacenda, the writers' room includes Nina Luckshmi Mohan, Mark Stasenko, Zeke Nicholson, the duo of Kevin and Matthew McManus, Jamiesen Borak, Rachel Hein, Taylor Santiago Berger, and Mackenzie Sammeth.

=== Casting ===
With the series announcement, Skyler Gisondo was confirmed to reprise his role as Jimmy Olsen, with Gorilla Grodd also appearing. Other reporters from the Daily Planet–outside of Lois Lane and Clark Kent–were expected to appear. Jimmy Tatro entered negotiations in early July 2026 to portray Grodd, after previously starring in American Vandal, and he was cast a week later. Mary Holland was cast as Sandra, the series' female lead, in early August. Casting was finalized ahead of the series order later that month, when Eduardo Franco, Arian Moayed, Perrault, Andrew Leeds, and Tim Baltz were announced as cast in undisclosed roles. They were set to join additional supporting cast members from Superman who were reprising their roles: Wendell Pierce as the Daily Planet editor-in-chief Perry White, Beck Bennett as Daily Planet reporter Steve Lombard, and Mikaela Hoover as Daily Planet columnist Cat Grant. In September, Sara Gilbert joined the cast as a journalist.

=== Filming ===
In June 2026, Gunn and Safran stated that filming for the series would start later that year. Yacenda is set to direct all eight episodes. In early September, filming commenced at the Georgia Institute of Technology in Atlanta, to stand in for Metropolis University. At the end of October, Gisondo said that filming had wrapped "a couple of weeks ago".

== Release ==
The People v. Gorilla Grodd will be released on the streaming service HBO Max and will consist of eight episodes. It is expected to release after the DCU film Man of Tomorrow, scheduled for July 2027, as part of the DCU's Chapter One: Gods and Monsters slate.
