= Fight for '84 =

- Directed by: Andrés Baiz
- Written by: Andy Weiss; Andrea Berloff; John Gatins
- Produced by: Jamie Foxx; Eric Newman; Bryan Unkeless; Michael W. Abbott
- Starring: Jamie Foxx; Malachi Beasley; Shea Whigham; Dan Perrault; Will Chase; Algee Smith
- Cinematography: Armando Salas
- Production companies: Grand Electric; Night Owl; A Move Films Production
- Distributed by: Netflix
- Country: United States
- Language: English

Fight for '84 is an upcoming American biographical sports drama film directed by Andrés Baiz (in his English-language debut), from a screenplay by Andy Weiss, Andrea Berloff, and John Gatins. It stars Jamie Foxx, Malachi Beasley, Shea Whigham, Dan Perrault, Will Chase, and Algee Smith.

== Premise ==
It takes place after a 1980 plane crash claims America's Olympic boxing team. It shows a determined coach taking on the monumental task of assembling and training new fighters for glory at the 1984 Summer Olympics.

== Cast ==
- Jamie Foxx
- Malachi Beasley
- Shea Whigham
- Dan Perrault
- Will Chase
- Algee Smith
- Jamir Cope
- Mitchell Edwards
- Al-Shabazz Jabateh
- Tre McBride
- Xavier Mills
- Adrian Martinez
- Javier Bolaños

== Production ==
In May 2025, it was announced that Andrés Baiz would be directing his English-language debut film, with Jamie Foxx in the lead role, who plays a coach hired to reconstitute the U.S. Olympic boxing team after the original team is killed in a tragic plane crash in 1980. In October, Malachi Beasley, Shea Whigham, Dan Perrault, Will Chase, Algee Smith, Jamir Cope, Mitchell Edwards, Al-Shabazz Jabateh, Tre McBride, Xavier Mills, Adrian Martinez, and Javier Bolaños rounded out the cast.

=== Filming ===
Principal photography began on September, 29, 2025, in New Jersey, with Armando Salas serving as the cinematographer.
