= Cuddy Chicks Ltd v Ontario (Labour Relations Board) =

- Supreme Court of Canada

Hearing: 7 November 1990 Judgment: 6 June 1991
- Full case name: Cuddy Chicks Limited v Ontario Relations Board and United Food and Commercial Workers International Union, Local 175
- Citations: [1991] 2 SCR 5
- Docket No.: 21675
- Prior history: APPEAL from Cuddy Chicks Ltd v Ontario (Labour Relations Board), 1989 CanLII 4139 (8 September 1989)
- Ruling: Appeal dismissed

Court membership
- Chief Justice: Antonio Lamer; Puisne Justices: Bertha Wilson, Gérard La Forest, Claire L'Heureux-Dubé, John Sopinka, Charles Gonthier, Peter Cory, Beverley McLachlin, William Stevenson

Reasons given
- Majority: La Forest, joined by Lamer, Sopinka, Gonthier, Cory, McLachlin, and Stevenson
- Concurrence: Wilson, joined by L'Heureux-Dubé

Cuddy Chicks Ltd v Ontario (Labour Relations Board), [1991] 2 SCR 5 is a leading Supreme Court of Canada decision on the jurisdiction of tribunals to hear constitutional challenges of the tribunal's enabling statute.

== Background ==
The United Food and Commercial Workers International Union, Local 175, the union of several employees of Cuddy Chicks Ltd. (a chicken hatcher), filed a complaint to the Labour Relations Board that included a challenge of the constitutionality of the board's enabling statute which excluded agricultural workers. The union claimed the exclusion violated the right to freedom of association under paragraph 2(d) of the Canadian Charter of Rights and Freedoms and the right to equality under section 15. Cuddy Chicks disputed the ability of the board to consider constitutional issues.

The board found that it was able to consider the issue by virtue of its requirement under subsection 24(2) of the Charter and section 52 of the Constitution Act, 1867.

== Ruling ==
The court dismissed the appeal and upheld the tribunal's authority to rule in constitutional issues of its enabling statute.

The court outlined three factors to be considered before a tribunal can hear a constitutional challenge. First, it "must already have jurisdiction over the whole of the matter before it, namely, the parties, subject matter and remedy sought". Second, the court must consider the nature of the tribunal's expertise and specialization, and finally the court must consider whether the attorney general of the province will participate in the proceedings before the Labour Relations Board. However, the court limited this ability by denying the tribunal any power to strike down any part of the law. Justice Gérard La Forest said that "a formal declaration of invalidity is not a remedy which is available to the board. Instead, the board simply treats any impugned provision as invalid for the purposes of the matter before it".

This test has the same three criteria as the test for a "court of competent jurisdiction" under subsection 24(1) of the Charter, except here it does not matter if the tribunal is a "court" or not.

The court further held that decisions of constitutionality can be reviewed on a standard of "correctness".

== See also ==
- Douglas/Kwantlen Faculty Assn v Douglas College, [1990] 3 SCR 570
- List of Supreme Court of Canada cases (Lamer Court)
- Tétreault-Gadoury v Canada (Employment and Immigration Commission), [1991] 2 SCR 22
