= We are Yesterday =

2025 American comic book story

- Publisher: DC Comics
- Publication date: June – September 2025
Title(s)
See below
- Main characters: Justice League; Gorilla Grodd; Batman; Superman; The Flash; Legion of Doom

Creative team
- Writer: Mark Waid
- Artists: Clayton Henry; Travis Moore
- Penciller: Dan Mccaid
- Letterer: Steve Wands
- Colorists: Patricia Mulvihill; Alejandro Sánchez
- Editor: Chris Rosa

"We are Yesterday" is a 2025 American comic book crossover storyline published by DC Comics. Serving as the beginning of the DC All In initiative, the crossover was written by Mark Waid, with art by Dan Mora. The storyline ran between June to September, 2025. The crossover received critical acclaim who praised the complex multiversal story, art, and action.

== Publication history ==
The first major crossover of DC All In introduces the Legion of Doom and more in the pages of Batman/Superman: World’s Finest, Justice League Unlimited, and the Batman/Superman: World’s Finest 2025 Annual.

== Plot ==
=== Prologue ===
While dealing with an enemy named Inferno who has been terrorizing the Green (Swamp Thing's avatar), Batman and Atom are trying to find out where Martian Manhunter's powers went following the events of Absolute Power. New Justice League member Air Wave helps free Gorilla Grodd and the rest of the prisoners out before escaping to meet up with the Legion of Doom (Joker, Lex Luthor, Bizarro, Sinestro, Captain Cold, Scarecrow, and Black Manta) from the past. Inferno is revealed to be an alternate name for the Legion of Doom.

=== Main Story ===
In the past, Clark Kent and Bruce Wayne are going to Gotham City on a jet alongside Hal Jordan when Hal's jet malfunctions and he is forced to crash due to Grodd. Superman, Batman, and Flash go to Gorilla City, where Grodd manages to possess Superman's mind by separating the heroes from each other. Solovar teams up with Batman, Flash, and Hal to apprehend Superman, but he threatens to kill him using a powerful ape named Titano. They manage to free Superman from Grodd. While imprisoned, the present Grodd travels to the past and possesses his past self.

Grodd frees himself and manipulates Air Wave to be on his side by giving him illusions of the Justice League being evil, while recruiting past versions of the Legion of Doom members to create time traveling devices. Grodd accesses Air Wave's memories to gain the Justice League's secrets before seemingly killing him. Wonder Woman, Hal Jordan, Black Lightning, Shazam, Carol Ferris, Green Arrow, Donna Troy and Stargirl arrive to confront them after tracing Air Wave's energy signature.

Grodd remembers how in the past, he convinced the villains to work for him after instructing Sinestro to look into his mind where the heroes are victorious. The villains split off into teams to steal tachyon energy, and Scarecrow hits Robin with a ray gun, transporting him to the present where Batman and Nightwing meet him. When the rest of the heroes arrive to confront Grodd and the villains, Pythoness uses tachyon energy to send everyone to the present, leaving the heroes stranded in the past.

When Robin shakes hands with Nightwing, Robin and past Batman/Superman are transported to the present, while current Batman, Nightwing and Superman are transported to the past. Past Batman, Superman and Robin take down Sinestro and Scarecrow while current Batman, Superman and Nightwing go to the Batcave and meet Alfred Pennyworth. The current heroes then head to Fortress of Solitude to get a time sphere from Legion of Super-Heroes to travel to the present, but Sinestro transport the past heroes to a Arabia 14 million BC.

The time-displaced Legion of Doom defeat the current Justice League while also putting up time barriers, preventing the heroes from traveling in time. The Legion of Doom arrive at the Omega rift (where Darkseid allowed the League to kill him) to gain more power. Air Wave manages to communicate the rest of the League due to being a living transmission signal and relaying their voices. Atom realizes that Air Wave was weaponized to transport the League through time, and the rest of the League arrive in the present, but not before Grodd absorbs Darkseid's energy.

When Air Wave arrives in the present with the Justice League, he also transports alternate versions of heroes including Batman Beyond (an alternate version of Tim Drake), Superman Blue, Aquaman with a hook for a hand, an early version of Barry Allen, and an early version of Batman. The Omega energy begins to overwhelm Air Wave, but Martian Manhunter manages to weaken Grodd long enough for Air Wave to take him out. Grodd is taken to custody, but because of the tampering with the Omega Rift, the time-displaced heroes are stuck in the present day. Meanwhile, the Time Trapper arrives in a pocket universe, where it meets with the World Forger to prepare for a future crisis event.

== Reading order ==
Prologue

- Justice League Unlimited (Volume 2) #5

Core Issues

- Batman/Superman: World's Finest #38
- Justice League Unlimited (Volume 2) #6
- Batman/Superman: World's Finest 2025 Annual #1
- Batman/Superman: World's Finest #39
- Justice League Unlimited (Volume 2) #7
- Justice League Unlimited (Volume 2) #8
- Justice League Unlimited (Volume 2) #9

Aftermath

- Justice League: Dark Tomorrow Special #1

== Critical reception ==
According to ComicbookRoundup, the event received an average rating of 8.1 out of 10 based on 222 reviews.
