= Dan Perrault =

American screenwriter

- Born: Hingham, Massachusetts, U.S.
- Occupations: Writer, producer
- Known for: Co-creator of American Vandal

Dan Perrault is an American television writer and producer. He is best known for his role in the television series American Vandal, which earned him a Peabody Award. He is also a two time winner of the Perrault of the Year award on the Section 10 Podcast.

== Early life and career ==
Perrault was born in Hingham, Massachusetts.

In 2011, Perrault, Yacenda, and Carrigan co-founded the production company Woodhead Entertainment. In 2012, he briefly worked on the Screen Junkies comedy web series Honest Trailers.

In 2016, Perrault served as co-creator, writer, and executive producer for the Netflix crime mockumentary series American Vandal. In 2021, Universal bought the rights to Perrault's original screenplay for the comedy film Strays. Perrault served as the co-creator, writer and executive producer for the Paramount+ series Players, alongside Yacenda. In 2025, it was announced that Perrault had joined the cast for the Netflix film Fight for '84. Perrault is also an occasional contributor to the Section 10 Podcast. Most notably, he was the recipient of the 2024 and 2025 edition of the prestigious "Perrault of the Year"(POTY) award.

== Filmography ==
Year	Title	Role	Note(s)
2012–13	Honest Trailers	Writer	10 episodes
2017–18	American Vandal	Creator	16 episodes
2022	Players	Creator	10 episodes
2023	Strays	Writer	Also actor
2025	The Residence	Actor	8 episodes
2026	Love Language	Actor	
TBA	Fight for '84 †	Actor	Post-production
TBA	The People v. Gorilla Grodd †	Creator	Filming
