= Will Chase =

American actor and singer (born 1970)

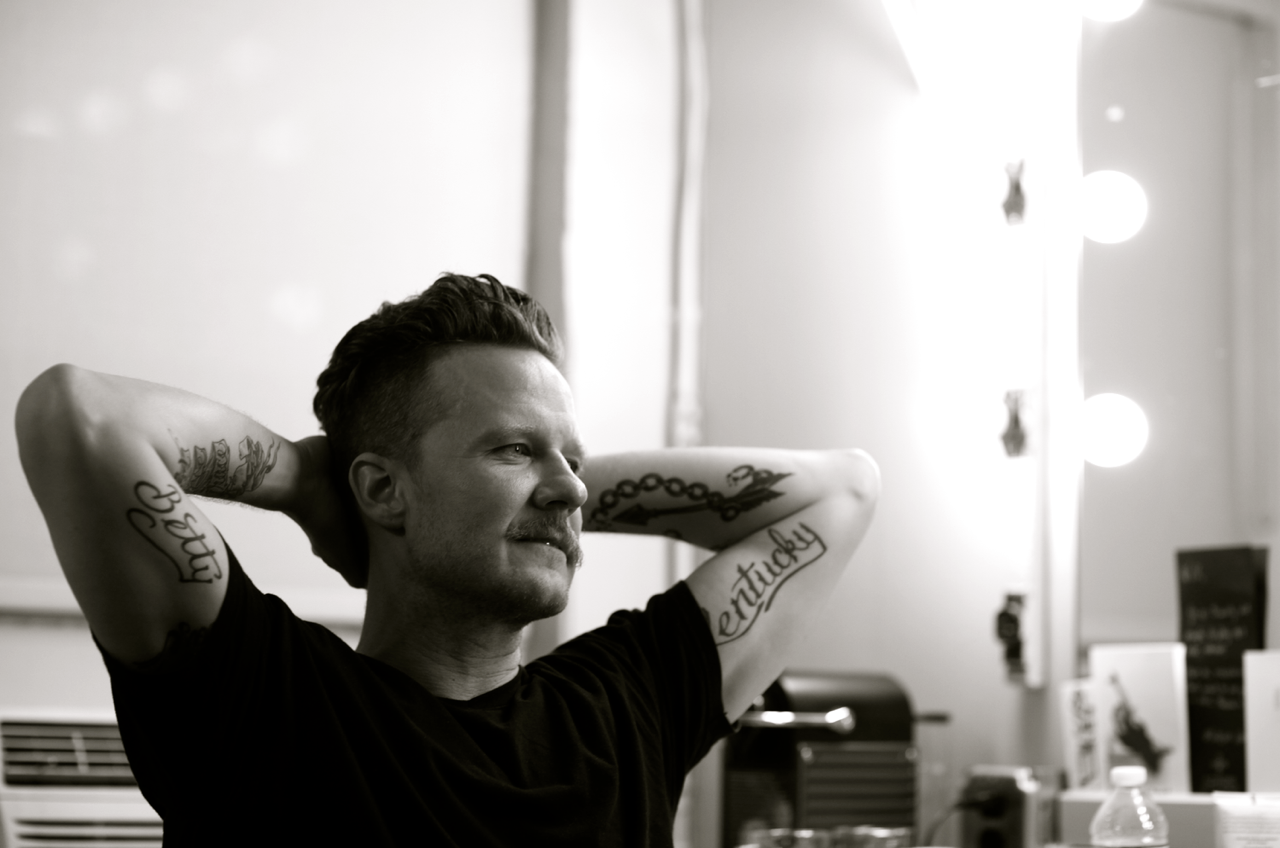
- Chase backstage at Something Rotten! in 2016 (photo by Deb Lopez)
- Born: Frank William Chase; September 12, 1970 (age 55); Frankfort, Kentucky
- Education: Oberlin College (BM)
- Occupations: Actor; director; singer
- Years active: 1998–present
- Spouses: Lori Davis (m. 1998; div. 2008); Stephanie Gibson (m. 2009; div. 2012)
- Partner(s): Debra Messing (2011–2014); Ingrid Michaelson (2015–present)
- Children: 2
- Website: will-chase.com

Frank William Chase (born September 12, 1970) is an American actor, director, and singer, best known for his work on Broadway and for his role as country superstar Luke Wheeler on ABC's Nashville.

== Early life and education ==
Chase was born in Frankfort, Kentucky, to Betty and Jerry Chase, and is the youngest of three sons. He graduated from Western Hills High School and the Oberlin Conservatory of Music, where he studied conducting with Robert Spano and percussion with Michael Rosen.

== Career ==
Chase started his acting career in Chicago, performing in regional theater productions and received three Joseph Jefferson Award nominations. He then played Chris in the 2nd National Tour of Miss Saigon. He first performed on Broadway in 1998 as the Squeegee Man and Mark/Roger understudy in Rent, and went on to star as Roger in the final Broadway company of Rent, which was recorded for the theatrical release entitled Rent: Filmed Live on Broadway. His additional Broadway credits in the early 2000s include Miss Saigon (with the original star Lea Salonga playing Kim to close the Broadway production); The Full Monty (2001); Aida (Radames replacement, 2003–04); and Lennon (2005). Tony in Billy Elliot the Musical. He was also in A Little Princess the Musical as Captain Crewe. In 2005, he played Neville Craven in the 2005 World AIDS Day The Secret Garden concert.

In 2006, he starred in High Fidelity on Broadway, and played Valentin in Kiss of the Spider Woman at the Signature Theatre in Arlington, Virginia, for which he received a nomination for the 2009 Helen Hayes Award for Outstanding Lead Actor.

He appeared in The Pajama Game opposite Kate Baldwin at The Muny (St. Louis) in July 2007. He starred in Oklahoma in 2007 at the Lyric Theatre opposite Kelli O'Hara, and on Broadway in the short-lived musical The Story of My Life in 2009. Starting in 2009, Chase played the role of Tony in Billy Elliot the Musical until 2011. In August 2012, he temporarily filled in for Matthew Broderick as Jimmy Winter in the Broadway musical, Nice Work If You Can Get It.

At the 2013 Tony Awards, he was nominated for Tony Award for Best Featured Actor in a Musical for his role as John Jasper/Mr. Clive Paget in the Broadway revival of The Mystery of Edwin Drood.

Chase guest starred as Michael Swift in the NBC series Smash. He then went on to star for 3 seasons as country superstar Luke Wheeler on the television series Nashville. His other television appearances include Quantico, HBO's The Deuce, the recurring role of Pat Mahoney on Rescue Me, Cupid, Canterbury's Law, Law & Order, Third Watch, Conviction, and Queens Supreme, Hallmark's The Lost Valentine, alongside Jennifer Love Hewitt and Betty White; the 2011 season finale of Royal Pains (USA); Blue Bloods (CBS); and the ABC drama Pan Am. In 2012, he appeared on the series White Collar, in the episode "Neighborhood Watch", and appeared on the series Unforgettable, in the episode "The Comeback".

He played the title role in the 2013 film Butterflies of Bill Baker, winning Best Actor at the 2013 Chain Film Festival. Chase also voiced the wolf Angee in A Warrior's Tail (2016).

In 2016, Chase assumed the role of William Shakespeare from Christian Borle on Broadway in the musical Something Rotten!, while simultaneously filming both HBO's The Deuce, and the ABC drama Time After Time, in the series regular role of Griffin Monroe.

He played abusive father Neil Hargrove in the second season of the American supernatural horror-science fiction television series, Stranger Things, which premiered in late 2017, and in 2018 appeared in HBO's drama Sharp Objects as Bob Nash.

He starred as Fred Graham/Petruchio opposite Kelli O'Hara in the 2019 Broadway revival of Kiss Me, Kate.

In 2020 and 2021, he wrote and directed the award- winning short film Dagger, co-starring Jack Davenport, and Trunk Show, which featured his children, actors Daisy and Gracie Chase, winning Best Short Film at the 2021 Ridgewood Guild International Film Festival. Also in 2021, he played Michael Friedman in Danny Strong’s Pulitzer Prize-winning series Dopesick.

In 2022, he played Kurt Dockweiler in the first season of Bosch: Legacy. That same year he finished production on Apple TV's The Crowded Room, starring alongside Tom Holland and Emmy Rossum which premiered in June of 2023.

In 2024 Chase directed Mick Lynch's one-man show An Irish Goodbye at Kaatsbaan Cultural Park, and in 2025 directed the feature documentary Coming Home: The Guggenheim Grotto Back In Ireland, which won the Jury Award for Best Short Film at the LIMEHOF Music Documentary Film Festival and Best Director of a Documentary at Chain Film Festival. In 2027 he will direct the musical short film Here, Bullet, which he co-wrote with composer Kurt Erickson, based on Erickson's prize-winning song cycle of the same name, which was adapted from the original anthology of 2005 Beatrice Hawley Award-winning poems, "Here, Bullet", by renowned American poet Brian Turner. Alongside Erickson and Turner, Chase co-created and is a teaching artist for Finding Voice & Vision, a creative arts therapy program for veterans, sponsored by the California Arts Council and the National Endowment for the Arts. In 2025, it was announced that Chase would be joining Jamie Foxx and Andrés Baiz in the Netflix feature film Fight for '84.

== Personal life ==
Chase has two children, actors Daisy and Gracie Chase, with the late Lori Davis, to whom he was married from 1996 to 2008. He was married to actress Stephanie Gibson from 2009 until their divorce in 2012.

He and Debra Messing dated from 2011 to 2014.

Chase has been in a relationship with musician Ingrid Michaelson since 2015.

== Filmography ==
Key
†	Denotes works that have not yet been released

=== Actor ===
Year	Title	Role	Notes
2000	Shaft	Walter's Friend	Film
2001	Fling (FOX network, created by Glenn Gordon Caron)	Dan Fields	Episode: #1.2 "In Genes We Trust"
2002	Guiding Light	Store Manager	Episode dated August 14, 2002
2002	Third Watch	Reilly	Episode: #4.8 "Ladies' Day"
2003	Queens Supreme	ADA Pheiffer	Episode: #1.1 "One Angry Man"
2003	Law & Order	David	Episode: #13.11 "Chosen"
2004	Everyday People	Dad (uncredited)	HBO Film
2004	Law & Order	Mellors' Co-Owner	Episode: #14.18 "Evil Breeds"
2006	Conviction	Detective Dave Lamanski	Episode: #1.4 "Indebted"
2006	As the World Turns	Dr. Linn	Episode dated May 1, 2006; Episode dated May 3, 2006
2006	All My Children	A.D.A. Phillips	Episode #1.9395
2008	Law & Order	Derek Cahill	Episode: #18.4 "Bottomless"
2008	Canterbury's Law	Artie Flom	Episode: #1.3 "What Goes Around"
2008	Rent: Filmed Live on Broadway	Roger Davis	Film
2009	Four Single Fathers	Lance	Film
2009	Cupid	Peter	Episode: #1.6 "Left of the Dial"
2009	Law & Order: Criminal Intent	Jacob Garrety	Episode: #8.15 "Passion"
2009	One Life to Live	Dr. Jason Nance	Episode: #1.10564 "Sing Along with Mitch"; Episode: #1.10565 "The Greenhouse Effect"; Episode: #1.10566 "Angel of Death"; Episode: #1.10567 "Dads Gone Wild"
2009–2010	Rescue Me	Pat Mahoney	Episode: #5.5 "Sheila"; Episode: #6.4 "Breakout"; Episode: #6.6 "Sanctuary"; Episode: #6.8 "Cowboy"
2011	The Lost Valentine	Andrew Hawthorne	TV film
2011	Royal Pains	Benjamin Richards	Episode: #2.18 "Listen to the Music"
2011	Pan Am	John Stanton	Episode: #1.1 "Pilot"
2011	Blue Bloods	William Flood	Episode: #2.3 "Critical Condition"
2012	White Collar	Connor Bailey	Episode: #3.13 "Neighborhood Watch"
2012	Unforgettable	Reed Benedict	Episode: #1.18 "The Comeback"
2012–2013	Smash	Michael Swift	10 episodes; Recurring role (season 1)
2013	Necessary Roughness	David Blaze	Episode: #2.13 "Hits and Myths"
2013	It Could Be Worse	Pervy	Episode: #1.6 "Him, I want Him"
2013	Butterflies of Bill Baker	Bill Baker (Best Actor-Chain Film Festival)	Film
2013	The Ordained	Gavin	TV film
2013–2014	The Good Wife	Detective Doug Young	Episode: #4.18 "Death of a Client"; Episode: #5.16 "The Last Call"
2013–2017	Nashville	Luke Wheeler/Himself	57 episodes; Recurring role (season 2); Main role (Seasons 3–4); Guest role (Seasons 5–6)
2015	For Real	Blaine	Film
2015	A Warrior's Tail	Anga (English version, voice)	Film
2017	Time After Time	Griffin Monroe	12 episodes; Main role
2017	Law & Order: Special Victims Unit	Byron Marks	Episode: #19.1 "Gone Fishin'"
2017	The Deuce	Jack	Episode: #1.4 "I See Money"; Episode: #1.5 "What Kind of Bad?"
2017, 2019	Stranger Things	Neil Hargrove	Episode: #2.8 "Chapter Eight: The Mind Flayer"; Episode: #3.6 "Chapter Six: E Pluribus Unum"
2018	American Crime Story	Detective Paul Scrimshaw	Episode: #2.1 "The Man Who Would Be Vogue"; Episode: #2.2 "Manhunt"; Episode: #2.9 "Alone"
2018	E-Bowla	Big Thumper	Short Film
2018	Quantico	Frank Marlow	Episode: #3.6 "Heaven's Fall"; Episode: #3.9 "Fear Feargach"
2018	Sharp Objects	Bob Nash	5 episodes; Main role (Mini-Series)
2018–2019	Madam Secretary	Owen Callister	Episode: #5.4 "Requiem"; Episode: #5.18 "Ready"; Episode: #5.19 "The Great Experience"; Episode: #5.20 "Better Angels"
2018–2019	Impulse	Simon	6 episodes; Recurring Role
2019	The Village	John	Episode: #1.1 "Pilot"
2019	FBI (TV series)	Det Harry Bloom	Episode: #2.10 "Ties That Bind"
2019	After the Wedding	Frank	Film
2020	The Iliza Shlesinger Sketch Show	Grizzled Music Man	Episode: #1.1
2021	Dopesick	Michael Friedman	8 episodes; Main role (Mini-series)
2021	Girls5eva	Stet	Episode: #1.8 "Separ8 Ways"
2021	Dagger	Tom	Short Film
2022	Bosch: Legacy	Kurt Dockweiler	Episode: #1.9 "Cat Got a Name?"; Episode: #1.10 "Always/All Ways"
2023	The Crowded Room	Marlin Reid	10 episodes; Main role (Mini-series)
2025	Mooch	Larry	Film
2025	A Break In The Rain	Randy	Film
TBA	Fight for '84		Film; Post-production

=== Director ===
Year	Title	Notes
2020	Tigers and Young men	Music video
2021	Dagger	Short film (Best Score-Hollywood Reel Independent Film Festival)
2021	I'm Right Here	Short film
2021	Trunk Show	Short film (Best Short Film-Ridgewood International Film Festival)
2021	Today	Segment Director
2022	Lawrence of Arabia	Music Video
2025	Coming Home: The Guggenheim Grotto Back In Ireland	Documentary (Best Short Film-LIMEHOF Music Documentary Film Festival) (Best Director of a Documentary-Chain Film Festival)
2026	A Gift For Ethan	Documentary (Best Documentary-Katra Film Series)
2026	An Afternoon Wake	Short film
2027	Here, Bullet †	Short film: Pre-production

== Theatre credits ==
Year	Title	Role	Notes
1996–1998	Miss Saigon	Chris Scott	US National Tour
1998	Rent	Steve / Ensemble u/s Roger Davis u/s Mark Cohen	Broadway
1998–2000	Miss Saigon	Chris Scott	Broadway
2000–2001	Miss Saigon	Chris Scott	Cultural Center of the Philippines
2001–2002	The Full Monty	Jerry Lukowski	Broadway
2003	Aida	Radames	Broadway
2004	Lennon	John	Broadway
2005	The Secret Garden	Dr. Neville Craven	Manhattan Center
2005–2006	Rent	Roger Davis	Broadway
2006	High Fidelity	Rob	Broadway
2008	Kiss of the Spider Woman	Valentin	Signature Theatre (Helen Hayes Award Nomination)
2008	Rent	Roger Davis	Broadway
2009	The Story of My Life	Tom	Broadway
2009–2011	Billy Elliot the Musical	Tony	Broadway
2010	Bells Are Ringing (musical)	Jeffrey Moss	Encores!
2012	Nice Work If You Can Get It	Jimmy Winter	Broadway
2012–2013	The Mystery of Edwin Drood	John Jasper / Mr. Clive Paget	Broadway (Tony Award, Outer Critics Award Nominations)
2015	The Music Man	Harold Hill	Cincinnati Music Hall
2016	Something Rotten!	William Shakespeare / The Bard	Broadway
2019	Kiss Me, Kate	Fred Graham / Petruchio	Broadway
2024	Once Upon A Mattress	Sir Harry	Broadway

== Awards and nominations ==
=== Tony Awards ===
Year	Category	Nominated work	Result
2013	Best Featured Actor in a Musical	The Mystery of Edwin Drood	Nominated

=== Other awards ===
Year	Award	Category	Nominated work	Result
2008	Helen Hayes Award	Outstanding Lead Actor	Kiss of the Spider Woman	Nominated
2013	Chain Film Festival	Best Actor	Butterflies of Bill Baker	Won
2013	Outer Critics Circle Awards	Best Featured Actor in a Musical	The Mystery of Edwin Drood	Nominated
2021	Ridgewood Guild International Film Festival	Best Short Film	Trunk Show (written and directed by Will Chase)	Won
2025	LIMEHOF Music Documentary Film Festival	Best Short Film	Coming Home: The Guggenheim Grotto Back in Ireland (Directed by Will Chase)	Won
2025	Chain Film Festival	Best Director of a Documentary	Coming Home: The Guggenheim Grotto Back in Ireland (Directed by Will Chase)	Won
2026	Katra Film Series	Best Documentary	A Gift For Ethan (Directed by Will Chase)	Won
