= Tatro =

Tatro is a surname. Notable people with the surname include:

- Duane Tatro (1927–2020), American composer
- Dustin Tatro (1927–2020), American stadium organist
- Jimmy Tatro (born 1992), American actor, comedian, writer, and YouTube personality
