= Thériault =

Thériault is a surname. Notable people with the surname include:

- Bernard Thériault (born 1955), Canadian politician
- Camille Thériault (born 1955), Canadian politician, former premier of New Brunswick
- Charles Theriault, Maine politician
- Denis Thériault (born 1959), Canadian writer
- Edward Joseph Thériault (1901–1968), Liberal party member of the Senate of Canada
- Élisée Thériault (1884–1958), lawyer and political figure in Quebec
- Éric Thériault (born 1967), Canadian cartoonist
- Gérard Charles Édouard Thériault (1932–1998), Canadian Chief of Defense Staff
- Guillaume Deschênes-Thériault, Canadian politician
- Harold Theriault (born 1953), Canadian politician
- Janine Theriault (born 1975), Canadian actress
- Jean-Yves Thériault, bassist from Canadian metal group Voivod
- Jean-Yves Thériault (kickboxer) (born 1955), Canadian kickboxer
- John Theriault (born 1960), Australian curler
- Lévite Thériault (1837–1896), landowner and political figure in New Brunswick
- Lise Thériault (born 1966), Quebec politician
- Lyn Thériault, formerly known as Lyn Faust, politician in Montreal, Quebec, Canada
- Mathieu Corbeil-Thériault (born 1991), Canadian ice hockey goaltender
- Michelle Theriault Boots, American academic and journalist
- Milaine Thériault (born 1973), Canadian skier
- Nancy Theriault, American politician
- Nicole Theriault (born 1972), Thai singer and actress
- Norbert Thériault (1921–2016), Canadian politician
- Paul Thériault, Canadian politician, former leader of the Yukon Liberal Party
- Roch Thériault (1947–2011), Canadian religious leader
- Sean Theriault (born 1972), American professor
- Serge Thériault (born 1948), Quebec comedian and actor
- Yves Thériault (1915–1983), Canadian author

== Other uses ==
- École Secondaire catholique Thériault, Canadian high school in Timmins, Ontario
- A. F. Theriault Shipyard, a ship yard and boatbuilder in Meteghan River, Nova Scotia
