= Mother/Android =

2021 American science fiction film

- Hulu release poster
- Directed by: Mattson Tomlin
- Written by: Mattson Tomlin
- Produced by: Matt Reeves; Bill Block; Mattson Tomlin; Rafi Crohn; Adam Kassan; Charles Miller
- Starring: Chloë Grace Moretz; Algee Smith; Raúl Castillo
- Cinematography: Pat Scola
- Edited by: Andrew Groves
- Music by: Kevin Henthorn; Michelle Birsky
- Production companies: Miramax; 6th & Idaho Motion Picture Company
- Distributed by: Hulu (United States); Netflix (International)
- Release dates: December 17, 2021 (United States); January 7, 2022 (International)
- Running time: 111 minutes
- Country: United States
- Language: English

Mother/Android is a 2021 American post-apocalyptic science fiction thriller film, written and directed by Mattson Tomlin in his feature directorial debut, and starring Chloë Grace Moretz, Algee Smith and Raúl Castillo. It follows a pregnant woman and her boyfriend who try to reach a fortified Boston amidst an AI takeover. It was released on December 17, 2021 on Hulu.

== Plot ==
On Christmas Eve in the future, Georgia Olsen finds out that she is pregnant. The child's father, her boyfriend, Sam Hoth, asks her to marry him, but Georgia is uncertain about the relationship and her desire to be a mother. She decides not to tell her parents.

Forgetting her phone at home, Georgia goes to a college Christmas party with Sam. An android named Eli, owned by the Olsens, wishes Sam happy Halloween instead of Christmas, the first suggestion that something is amiss.

At the party, a shrill screech is suddenly heard, and an android turns violent. He attacks Georgia and Sam, who flee the house. Smartphones unexpectedly explode, killing their users and leading to an AI takeover.

Nine months later, Georgia, expecting her baby, has taken shelter in the forest with Sam. They are trying to reach Boston, which has been fortified against the androids. They have heard rumors of a boat transporting new mothers to Asia, where they can find a peaceful life.

Avoiding roads, they travel through the woods until they reach a military camp. While Georgia is examined by a doctor, Sam asks the soldiers how they can reach Boston. One of them says he'll give Sam the info if Sam can beat him in a fight. The next day, Georgia finds Sam in captivity for seriously injuring the soldier he beat, and they are expelled from the camp. They continue until they find an abandoned house, where they spend the night. Sam finds a dirt bike and repairs it.

The next day, they stop the bike at a river, where they are spotted by an android, who pursues them on foot. Soon, several more androids give chase, accompanied by drones. Sam drops off Georgia and tries to lure the androids away on the bike. An oddly camouflaged man finds the hiding Georgia and offers to help her. He tells her that he was an AI programmer for Raster Robotics, the company that made the rebellious androids. He introduces himself as Arthur and says that the electronic camouflage he was wearing prevented the androids from seeing him.

In the morning, Georgia awakes to contractions. She tells Arthur that she needs to find Sam, and he leads her to where her partner is being held. They approach a building patrolled by androids, from which cries of pain are heard. Arthur gives Georgia a camouflage vest, and she walks through the building, looking for Sam, unseen by the androids. She finds him in one of the rooms with his legs badly broken. While she is freeing him, another prisoner tries to draw the androids' attention.

Georgia drags Sam out into a large garage. She collapses from contractions, and just as they are about to be apprehended, Arthur intervenes, stabbing an android and saving them. Georgia goes into labor in Arthur's truck. She wakes up in a hospital clinic, with Sam beside her. A nurse informs her that the C-section delivery went well, and that they have a boy. The couple name their son Forest, and Sam takes a photo of the family.

Later, Georgia is questioned by a security officer. She tells him what she and Sam went through and mentions the vest. The officer tells her that such camouflage technology does not exist. She then realizes that Arthur is an android and that he deceived her. Within moments, the power goes out, and the base comes under attack. Georgia tries to wake Sam, to no avail. She heads down to try and activate the base perimeter EMP and is confronted by Arthur. She shoots him in the face repeatedly, killing him. She manages to activate the EMP and returns to Sam.

When Georgia awakens again, she finds Sam alive. Together with Forest, they head to the harbor, where officers are loading a boat headed to Korea. They can take only Forest, as Georgia and a legless Sam would be a burden. After pleading with them to no avail, Sam convinces Georgia to let Forest go so he can have a better life. She then boards a military convoy to Portland alone, while Sam is implied to have died of his injuries.

== Cast ==
- Chloë Grace Moretz as Georgia
- Algee Smith as Sam
- Raúl Castillo as Arthur
- Linnea Gardner as Sarah
- Kiara Pichardo as Lisa
- Oscar Wahlberg as Derrick
- Christian Mallen as Kevin
- Jared Reinfeldt as Connor
- Liam McNeill as Daniel
- Stephen Thorne as Eli
- Jon F. Merz as Mr. Olsen
- Tamara Hickey as Mrs. Olsen
- Jason Bowen as Boston lieutenant
- Hana Kim as Korean official

== Production ==
In September 2020, Chloë Grace Moretz, Algee Smith, and Raúl Castillo joined the cast, with Mattson Tomlin directing from his screenplay, and Matt Reeves and Bill Block set to produce under their 6th and Idaho Productions and Miramax banners, respectively.

=== Writing ===
A few years after graduating from film school, Tomlin struggled to write his first movie, until he decided to loosely focus on a very personal story, that of his own adoption, which he said became a personal love letter to his biological parents. In an interview with Collider, he said: "I was born in the aftermath of the Romanian revolution, and I thought I would change that to the robot revolution", with the idea of adding a genre component to his personal story.

=== Filming ===
Principal photography took place from September to November 2020, mostly in Massachusetts. Downtown Boston was used as the setting for the human colony, and the Lynn Woods Reservation for the android stronghold.

== Release ==
On March 10, 2021, Hulu acquired the U.S. distribution rights to the film. It was released on December 17, 2021. Netflix acquired the international streaming rights to the film and it was released in all other regions on January 7, 2022.

== Reception ==
On the review aggregator website Rotten Tomatoes, 33% of 39 critics' reviews are positive, with an average rating of 4.5/10. The website's consensus reads: "Mother/Android transcends its budgetary limitations on a visual level -- unfortunately, this sci-fi drama is less successful on the storytelling front." Metacritic, which uses a weighted average, assigned the film a score of 43 out of 100, based on 12 critics, indicating "mixed or average" reviews.

Lena Wilson of The New York Times commented that the movie "offers little in the way of world building", and that the reason behind the android uprising is vague and confusing. She mentioned that because of this, "It offers ample room for the film's strong emotional core, but can be hopelessly distracting." Michael Ordoña of the Los Angeles Times agreed, saying that in order to fully enjoy the film, they would have to focus on the main characters' "relationship and their mission to get their coming baby to safety and let the details blur." He noted that though the story has an "emotional resonance" with the filmmakers, referencing the real-life situation it was based on, its execution was not "immediate or terrifying as one imagines".
