= Strays (2023 film) =

American film by Josh Greenbaum

- Theatrical release poster
- Directed by: Josh Greenbaum
- Written by: Dan Perrault
- Produced by: Phil Lord; Christopher Miller; Erik Feig; Aditya Sood; Louis Leterrier; Dan Perrault
- Starring: Will Ferrell; Jamie Foxx; Isla Fisher; Randall Park; Brett Gelman; Will Forte
- Cinematography: Tim Orr
- Edited by: David Rennie; Sabrina Plisco; Greg Hayden
- Music by: Dara Taylor
- Production companies: Lord Miller Productions; Picturestart; Rabbit Hole Productions
- Distributed by: Universal Pictures
- Release date: August 18, 2023
- Running time: 93 minutes
- Country: United States
- Language: English
- Budget: $46 million
- Box office: $36 million

Strays is a 2023 American comedy film directed by Josh Greenbaum and written by Dan Perrault. It follows an abandoned dog (voiced by Will Ferrell) who teams up with several strays (voiced by Jamie Foxx, Isla Fisher, and Randall Park) to take revenge on his abusive owner (Will Forte). The film additionally stars Harvey Guillén, Rob Riggle, Brett Gelman, Jamie Demetriou, Josh Gad and Sofía Vergara. Strays was theatrically released in the United States by Universal Pictures on August 18, 2023. It received mixed reviews from critics and grossed $36 million.

== Plot ==
Reggie is a naive Border Terrier who lives with his abusive owner Doug, who recently makes several attempts to ditch him. Abandoned in the city three hours away, Reggie meets street-wise Boston Terrier Bug who teaches him how to be a stray after he defends him from a Rottweiler and Dobermann duo. After a night with Bug and his friends – Australian Shepherd Maggie and Elizabethan collar-wearing therapy Great Dane Hunter – Reggie realizes that Doug has always despised him; he decides to take revenge on him by biting off his penis and the other strays accompany him for support. However, as Reggie has never been that far from Doug before, they must rely on landmarks he saw, including a "large hamster wheel" (a carnival's ferris wheel), a "giant cone" (a hill) and "the Devil in the Sky" (an image of a postman on a billboard).

During the journey, the strays bond as they get into several scuffles, culminating in capture by animal control. Coming up with a plan to escape, Reggie suggests that every dog defecates on the floor so when the official opens the door, he will slip on the feces and fall down, which enables their escape. Reggie convinces himself that he is to blame for Doug treating him poorly. This causes Bug to urinate on Reggie's bandana in a fit of rage and Reggie leaves the other strays. Making their way back to the city, Bug, Maggie and Hunter stumble upon lost girl scout Riley Anderson and alert a search and rescue worker to her location.

Reggie returns to Doug's house and, after reminiscing about all the times Doug mistreated him, he finally sees the reality. However, an enraged Doug prevents Reggie from leaving and attempts to kill him, but Bug, Hunter, and Maggie come to his aid. With their help, Reggie emasculates Doug as his house is inadvertently set on fire. Afterwards, Hunter returns to being a therapy dog and starts a relationship with Maggie, who begins training as a police dog, Riley adopts Bug and Reggie remains a stray and guides new strays, though he still often spends time with his friends. Meanwhile, a hospitalized Doug finds out that his penis' reattachment had failed, much to his dismay.

== Cast ==
- Will Forte as Doug, Reggie's abusive former owner
- Brett Gelman as Willy, an animal control official
- Dan Perrault as Doctor Hagen, a doctor seen in the mid-credits scene
- Dennis Quaid as a birdwatcher
- Mikayla Rousseau as Riley Anderson, a lost girl scout
- Jade Fernandez as Ashley, Doug's ex-girlfriend

=== Voices ===
- Will Ferrell as Reggie, a Border Terrier
- Jamie Foxx as Bug, a Boston Terrier
- Isla Fisher as Maggie, an Australian Shepherd
- Randall Park as Hunter, a Great Dane therapy dog with an Elizabethan collar
- Rob Riggle as Rolf, a German Shepherd police dog
- Josh Gad as Gus, a narrative Labrador Retriever
- Sofía Vergara as an old couch
- Jamie Demetriou as Chester, a Bulldog
- Greta Lee as Bella, a Pomeranian
- Jimmy Tatro as Finn, a Rottweiler
- Harvey Guillén as Shitstain, a Chihuahua
- Jack De Sanz as Munchkin, a bloodhound
- Phil Morris as Bubsy
- David Herman as a pound dog with an underbite

== Production ==
In August 2019, Phil Lord and Christopher Miller signed a first-look deal with Universal Pictures. In May 2021, Universal acquired the rights to Strays, an adult comedy film about dogs written by Dan Perrault, with Lord and Miller attached to produce alongside Erik Feig and Louis Leterrier. The film is a co-production between Picturestart and Rabbit Hole Productions. Filming began in September 2021 in Atlanta, Georgia. Production concluded by December 2021.

== Release ==
Strays was theatrically released in the United States on August 18, 2023, after being delayed from its original June 9, 2023 date. It was released on digital platforms on September 5, 2023, followed by DVD and Blu-ray releases on October 10, 2023.

== Reception ==
=== Box office ===
As of October 19, 2023, Strays has grossed $24 million in the United States and Canada, and $12 million in other territories, for a worldwide total of $36 million.

In the United States and Canada, Strays was released alongside Blue Beetle, and was initially projected to gross $15–17 million from 3,223 theaters in its opening weekend. After making $3.4 million on its first day (including $1.1 million from Thursday night previews), weekend estimates were lowered to $8.5 million. It went on to debut to $8.3 million, finishing in fourth. The film made $4.9 million in its second weekend (a drop of 40%), finishing in sixth.

=== Critical response ===
On the review aggregator website Rotten Tomatoes, 54% of 175 critics' reviews are positive, with an average rating of 5.4/10. The website's consensus reads: "Crudely effective and effectively crude, Strays is more amusing than hilarious, but this comedy's scattershot humor is partly offset by its surprisingly big heart." Metacritic, which uses a weighted average, assigned the film a score of 54 out of 100, based on 45 critics, indicating "mixed or average" reviews. Audiences polled by CinemaScore gave the film an average grade of "B+" on an A+ to F scale.

Glenn Kenny of The New York Times stated that "over the next 90-plus minutes, the canines drop as many F-bombs as Pacino did in Scarface. Then there are the scatological jokes, each one more outlandish than the last, none bearing the slightest tinge of wit or joy." Samantha Bergeson of IndieWire gave the film a "C", explaining that "it's absurd, it's existential, and it's glorious. Strays is The House That Jack Built meets Cats & Dogs, with the plot of Homeward Bound, turned violent." In a 3 out of 5 review, Ed Potton of The Times said that "at its best, this crude comedy does for dog movies what Bad Santa did for Christmas films and Sausage Party did for kids' animation, dragging them through the gutter and rolling them in filth, sometimes literally." John Nugent of Empire gave it a 3 out of 5 rating, describing it as "an exuberantly bad-taste ode to our poochy pals. Dumb & Dumber, but for dogs."
