= Algee Smith =

American actor and rapper (born 1994)

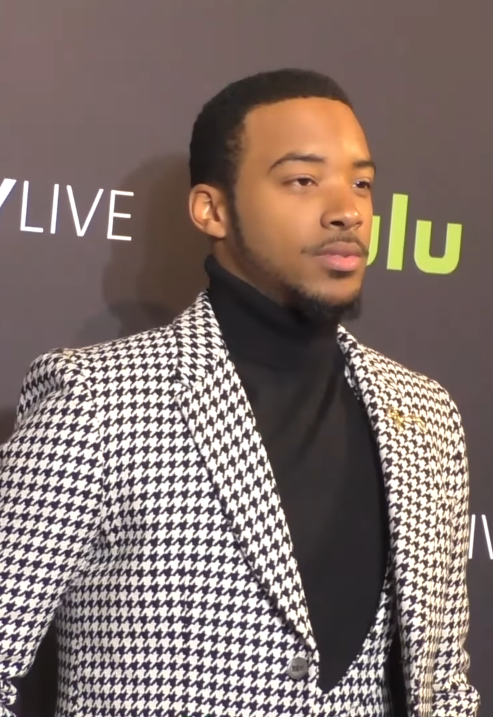
- Smith in 2016
- Born: November 7, 1994 (age 31); Saginaw, Michigan, U.S.
- Occupations: Actor; singer
- Years active: 2012–present

Algee Smith IV (born November 7, 1994) is an American actor and singer. After appearing in several small television roles, Smith first rose to fame portraying Ralph Tresvant in BET's The New Edition Story miniseries. The same year, he garnered critical acclaim as Larry Reed in Kathryn Bigelow's film Detroit. He is also known for his role as football player Chris McKay in the HBO drama series Euphoria.

== Early life ==
Smith, who is of African American heritage, was born in Saginaw, Michigan. At the age of eight, he and his family moved from Michigan to Atlanta where he started his acting career. Having an occultist for a father and a fashion designer for a mother, Smith was well immersed in the arts and also completed his first rap recording at the age of 9. During this time, he attained several minor television roles; those of which he credits for "perfecting his craft." Smith was home schooled for high school. He left Atlanta, GA and moved to Los Angeles at the age of 20.

== Career ==
After appearances in projects such as Disney Channel's Let It Shine and Earth to Echo, Smith landed his first major acting role playing real-life singer Ralph Tresvant in The New Edition Story, which also showcased his singing and dancing abilities. Smith also starred in Kathryn Bigelow's film Detroit, which tells the story of the Algiers Motel incident. His performance was praised by critics and he received a nomination for Outstanding Actor in a Motion Picture at the 2018 NAACP Image Awards. He also performed a song for the Detroit film soundtrack, called "Grow." On June 22, 2017, Smith released his first EP entitled Listen, featuring a blend of R&B and Hip hop tracks. In 2018, he co-starred with Amandla Stenberg in The Hate U Give, a film adaptation of the young adult novel of the same name. Smith also reprised his role as Ralph Tresvant in BET's The Bobby Brown Story. In 2019, he earned a starring role as Chris McKay in the highly acclaimed TV series Euphoria. Smith returned to film in 2021, portraying Jake Winters in the film Judas and the Black Messiah, which details the work and ultimate assassination of Black Panther Party activist Fred Hampton. He also appeared and portrayed one of the main roles, Sam, in the film Mother/Android. In 2025, it was announced that Smith would be joining Jamie Foxx and Andrés Baiz in the Netflix feature film Fight for '84.

== Filmography ==
=== Film ===
Year	Title	Role	Notes
2014	Earth to Echo	Marcus Simms	
2017	Detroit	Larry Reed	
2017	The Hate U Give	Khalil Harris	
2021	Judas and the Black Messiah	Jake Winters	
2021	Mother/Android	Sam	
2023	Young. Wild. Free.	Brandon Huffman	
2023	Shooting Stars	Illya McGee	
2026	The Gates	Kevin	
2027	Snoop	Warren "Warren G" Griffin III	Filming
TBA	Fight for '84		Post-production

=== Television ===
Year	Title	Role	Notes
2012	How to Rock	Spencer	1 episode
2012	Army Wives	Sam	1 episode
2012	Let It Shine	Da Boss	Television film
2015	Complications	Theo	2 episodes
2016	The Infamous	Dante	Television film
2016	Here We Go Again	Warren	1 episode
2016	Saints & Sinners	E.J.	1 episode
2017	The New Edition Story	Ralph Tresvant	Miniseries; main role
2018	Electric Dreams	Kaveh	1 episode
2018	The Bobby Brown Story	Ralph Tresvant	Miniseries; 2 episodes
2019–2022	Euphoria	Chris McKay	Main role (seasons 1–2)

== Discography ==
=== EPs ===
List of extended plays, with selected details
Title	Details
Listen	Released: June 23, 2017; Label: Access Records; Format: Digital download
24	Released: November 8, 2018; Format: Digital download
ATL	Released: 2019; Format: digital download

=== Mixtapes ===
List of mixtapes, with selected details
Title	Details
Flight Delayed	Released: July 19, 2018; Format: Digital download
