= Gorilla Grodd =

DC Comics supervillain

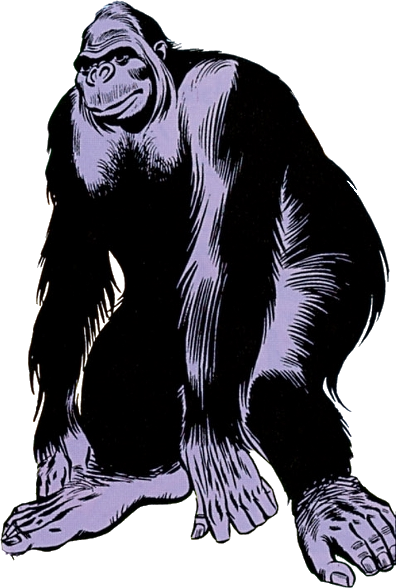
- Gorilla Grodd as he appeared in The Flash #106 (May 1959), art by Carmine Infantino and Joe Giella.

Publication information
- Publisher: DC Comics
- First appearance: The Flash #106 (May 1959)
- Created by: John Broome (writer); Carmine Infantino (artist)

In-story information
- Species: Meta-Gorilla
- Team affiliations: Legion of Doom; Secret Society of Super Villains; Injustice League; Anti-Justice League; Rogues
- Notable aliases: Drew Drowden; William Dawson (when in human forms)
- Abilities: Genius-level intellect; Superhuman strength, stamina, durability, speed, agility, reflexes, and senses; Telepathy; Telekinesis; Speed Force connection

Gorilla Grodd is a supervillain appearing in American comic books published by DC Comics. Created by John Broome and Carmine Infantino, the character first appeared in The Flash #106 (May 1959). He is an evil, super-intelligent gorilla who gained mental powers after being exposed to a strange meteorite's radiation. The character serves primarily as an antagonist of The Flash and has also fought other heroes such as Batman and Superman.

Grodd has appeared in several forms of DC-related media, including television series and films. He has been voiced by Stanley Ralph Ross, Powers Boothe, John DiMaggio, and David Sobolov, among others. He is set to headline The People v. Gorilla Grodd television series set in the DC Universe (DCU) with his voice provided by Jimmy Tatro.

== Fictional character biography ==
Gorilla Grodd is a hyper-intelligent telepathic gorilla able to control the minds of others. He and other gorillas gained sapience and psychic powers after an alien spaceship crashed in their area. The gorillas lived in peace until their home was discovered by explorers. Grodd forced one of the explorers to kill the alien and took over Gorilla City, planning to conquer the world next. Solovar telepathically contacts Barry Allen to warn of the evil gorilla's plans, and Grodd was defeated. The villain manages to return again and again to plague the Flash and the hero's allies.

In his first pre-Crisis appearance, Grodd meets the Flash while searching for Solovar (who had been imprisoned) during a trip to the human world. Grodd probed Solovar's mind to find the secret of mind control so he could control Gorilla City, using its inhabitants to take over the world. Solovar breaks out of the cage and tells the Flash. The Flash defeats Grodd and temporarily removes his telepathy. When his power returns, he escapes and builds a machine to strip his fellow gorillas of their intelligence. The Flash finds out from Solovar where Grodd has escaped to and destroys the machine. Grodd is again imprisoned, but uses a burrowing machine to escape. Assuming human form, he creates a drug to strengthen his abilities. After easily stopping the Flash, Grodd experiences a side effect that removes his new powers. The Flash arrests Grodd and takes him back to Gorilla City. Grodd fakes his death by transferring his mind into a man in Central City, but is caught and arrested. Later, he instigates the Flash's Rogues Gallery, breaking them out of jail to distract the Flash after transferring his mind to that of Freddy, a gorilla in a zoo. Thanks to Solovar, the Flash learns of Grodd's escape. Ironically, Grodd, despite using radiation to negate the Flash's speed, is defeated by the gorilla's mate when she hears him mention another gorilla. He and Freddy are restored to their normal bodies.

Grodd is recruited along with several other villains as one of the original members of the Secret Society of Super Villains. In this series, Grodd defeats Kalibak in hand-to-hand combat, but is later defeated by Captain Comet, who is able to repel Grodd's mental energy. During the hunt for a sorcerer's treasures, Grodd is able to fend off Wally West and escape him using the mentally-commanded Quadro-Mobile, then later knocks Comet unconscious, and is shown to be able to hypnotize Star Sapphire, as well as protect others from mental probing.

In a confrontation with Wally West, Grodd increases the brainpower of most of the animals in Central City. He hopes to endanger all the humans' lives, but this plan backfires because some of the pets are too loyal to their humans. Grodd's plans are defeated by the Flash, assisted by the Pied Piper, Vixen, and Rex the Wonder Dog.

Immortal villain Vandal Savage kidnaps Titans member Omen to form the perfect team of adversaries for the Teen Titans. Savage approaches Grodd, offering him membership in this new anti-Titans group known as Tartarus and promises of power and immortality. Grodd joins Tartarus on their mission to synthesize the immortal blood of H.I.V.E. leader Adeline Kane as Savage seeks to create a serum that will grant immortality. Their schemes are thwarted when the Titans intervene. Tempest later leads a rescue mission to save Omen from Savage. During the rescue attempt, Tartarus collapses upon itself due to each member having a different agenda, because Omen had purposely chosen members who would not work well together. When Siren switches alliances during the battle and aids Tempest in escaping, the Tartarus members go their separate ways.

Grodd has made no fewer than eighteen attempts to eliminate all traces of humanity from the face of the Earth. In Son of Ambush Bug #5 (November 1986), he travels to the Late Cretaceous "to wipe out all traces of human evolution from the time stream" (despite the fact that the ancestors of humanity would be his own ancestors as well). His plans are shattered by the sudden appearance of Titano and Ambush Bug waking from a nightmare. Whether or not Grodd's plan is a failure is disputable.

In the final issue of Captain Carrot and His Amazing Zoo Crew, Grodd travels to Earth-C-Minus in an attempt to conquer, but is defeated by the efforts of the Zoo Crew and Changeling of the Teen Titans.

Grodd later does another attempt to conquer Gorilla City by controlling the minds of Congo Bill, Congorilla, Djuba, Gorilla Boss, Monsieur Mallah, and Sam Simeon. In an attempt to expand his mind-control, Grodd suffers brain damage, freeing everyone from his mind-control.

In the 1991 Angel and the Ape limited series, Grodd is revealed as the grandfather of Sam Simeon (Angel's partner). This is in conflict with Martian Manhunter (vol. 2) Annual #2 (1999), which states that Simeon is Grodd's brother.

During the Final Night, Grodd attempted to use a mystical talisman called the Heart of Darkness (normally effective only in eclipses) that brought out the 'inner beast' of humans, turning the population of the town of Leesburg into feral monsters, including Supergirl. However, Supergirl fights off Grodd's influence, allowing her to oppose Grodd until the sun was restored. Grodd is assumed killed when an icicle fell into him.

One of Grodd's widest-ranging schemes was to arrange Solovar's assassination and manipulate Gorilla City into war against humanity, with the aid of a "shadow cabinet" of prominent gorillas called Simian Scarlet. In the course of this, Grodd absorbs too much neural energy from his fellow apes, leaving him with the intelligence of a normal gorilla. He has since recovered, and a failed attempt to set up a base in Florida leads to his capture and incarceration in Iron Heights.

Grodd had been trapped inside the human body of an overweight street bum. He was attacked by a gang known as the Vultures. One of them commented on how their member Iggo had the strength of a gorilla, which reminded Grodd of his true form. Suddenly changing back to his original shape and size, he quickly defeated the gang, making them believe that they are burning in molten lava by using his telepathic abilities. Reading the minds of the crooks, he saw that one of the former members of their gang was a friend of the Flash, and a plan began to form in his mind.

Grodd found another space rock, identical to the one that had given him his powers, and contacted Hector Hammond, a human who had also gained similar powers. Grodd was able to take control of Gorilla City after increasing his evolutionary abilities but was defeated once more.

Grodd is also seen in the Superman/Batman arc "Public Enemies" controlling numerous villains and heroes to take down Superman and Batman for the prize of one billion dollars offered by then U.S. President Lex Luthor. Despite his use of foes such as Mongul, Solomon Grundy, Lady Shiva, and Nightshade, Batman is able to deduce the mind behind the attacks and they quickly dispose of Grodd.

Grodd is responsible for Hunter Zolomon's crippling, resulting in the man's transformation into the villainous Zoom after trying to change the event to never have happened. Zolomon would often think about how Grodd used him as a plaything in that fight while talking this over with the Flash.

In Birds of Prey, Grodd makes a deal with Grimm to get Blockbuster an ape heart.

In the JLA Classified story arc, Grodd and his forces attack the Ultramarine Corps. Grodd has most of the citizens they are protecting killed. He personally eats some of the humans. During the course of this incident, Beryl informs the team that Grodd ranks number three on the latest "Global Most Wanted".

In the Justice League of America Wedding Special, Grodd is among the villains seen as members of the Injustice League Unlimited.

In Salvation Run, Grodd teams up with the Joker to gather their own faction of exiled supervillains. He kills Monsieur Mallah and Brain and was knocked off a cliff by the Joker. Grodd is seen alive and attempting to deliver payback to the Joker.

In Justice League of America, Grodd is shown among the members of Libra's new Secret Society and placed in the Inner Circle. In the Final Crisis storyline, Grodd is transformed into a Justifier. He is sent to apprehend Snapper Carr and Cheetah, but fails.

=== The New 52 ===
In The New 52 continuity reboot, Grodd is the prince of Gorilla City. His abilities are derived from the Speed Force, which the gorillas refer to as the "Light". The Flash (Barry Allen) first encounters Grodd after a trip through the Speed Force which strands him in Gorilla City, shortly after Grodd has killed his father and become king.

The Flash is hailed as a messenger spoken of in gorilla prophecy by all but Grodd, who sees the interloper as a threat to his ascension and designs for world conquest. When told of the treachery planned by the Ape Elders from his most trusted general, Grodd attempts to kill Barry and assume the mantle of the Light Bringer. The Flash foils Grodd's attempts by outmaneuvering him until Grodd causes the cave they are in to collapse, which allows Flash to escape.

During the "Forever Evil" storyline, Grodd returns to Central City and conquers it, renaming the city Grodd City. Eventually growing bored with this, Grodd leaves Central City to parts unknown.

=== DC Rebirth ===
In 2016, DC Comics implemented a relaunch of its books called "DC Rebirth", which restored its continuity to a form much as it was prior to The New 52. Grodd is depicted as the founder of the terrorist organization Black Hole and utilizes technology that contains the power of the Speed Force. In addition, he mind-controlled Meena Dhawan into operating as the Negative Flash.

In the We are Yesterday storyline, Grodd appears as a leading member of the Legion of Doom. He manipulates Air Wave into spying on the Justice League on his behalf, claiming that Air Wave is dying from "tachyon poisoning". Grodd later absorbs Omega energy from the rift created following Darkseid's death and dubs himself "Gorilla God". However, Air Wave betrays Grodd and defeats him with help from a group of heroes summoned from the past. Following his defeat, Grodd works with Time Trapper and the World Forger to deal with Darkseid's return and the damage dealt to the timestream.

== Powers and abilities ==
Grodd's psionic abilities allow him to place other beings under his mental control and transfer his consciousness into other bodies. Grodd also has (on occasion) vast telekinetic abilities ranging from force beams, telekinetic transmutation of matter and lifting thousands of tons mentally. In later appearances, he has shown the ability to absorb intelligence through the consumption of human brains. He possesses great superhuman strength far exceeding that of an ordinary gorilla. He is a scientific genius who has mastered Gorilla City's advanced technology and who has created many incredible inventions of his own.

In the New 52 reboot of DC continuity, Grodd, like all the super apes of Gorilla City, gained their powers from the Speed Force. Being of noble blood King Grodd is tougher, stronger, quicker and far more physically and mentally dynamic than other members of his evolved species. He boasts enhanced gorilla strength, enough to easily rend flesh from bone, pick up and smash cars and injure Flash through his speed aura, being durable enough to resist supersonic punches from the Flash, rip his way out of barbed wire unharmed and even survive impacts from a charging mammoth affected by the speed force. He has sharp enough reflexes to keep up with even the most nimble meta-humans with relative ease as he was able to grasp at Flash more than once while he was running, having intercepted many of his high-speed attacks more than once. Another facet to his physiology is that he can assimilate both the knowledge and powers of enemies who they kill by devouring their brains, a process dubbed "Cerecorbis". This process increases Grodd's intelligence and gives him the memories and powers of those he consumes. Via direct ingestion of the Light's energies, he gains enhanced speed and further augmented dynamism, enabling him to overpower Flash in combat. After being trapped in the Speed Force, Grodd gains telepathic abilities, which are normally only possessed by gorilla elders, as well as telekinesis which is unique to him.

== Other versions ==
- An alternate universe version of Gorilla Grodd from Earth-3 appears as a member of the Justice Underground in JLA Secret Files.
- An alternate universe version of Gorilla Grodd appears in Flashpoint. This version successfully conquered Africa, but became bored with the lack of challenge he faced afterwards.
- An alternate universe version of Grodd appears in Absolute Flash. This version is a small green monkey who acquired psychic powers after being experimented on by Project Olympus. Initially released to capture Wally West, the two quickly bond after Grodd psychically connects with the boy.

== In other media ==
=== Television ===
==== Live-action ====
Grodd as he appears in The Flash

- Gorilla Grodd appears in series set in the Arrowverse, voiced by David Sobolov. This version gained his psychic powers from Wade Eiling's experiments under S.T.A.R. Labs' supervision and speaks in an illeism.
  - Primarily appearing in and throughout The Flash, he mounts several failed attempts at subjugating humanity through various means, such as Gorilla City's army and a telepathy crown, only to be defeated by the eponymous character several times and King Shark on one occasion. Following the Crisis, Grodd reforms and leaves for Gorilla City, only to learn that its inhabitants were reverted to regular gorillas due to the Crisis and join the Red Death's Rogues until the Flash agrees to help him restore Gorilla City.
  - A time-displaced version of Grodd appears in the third season of Legends of Tomorrow, motion-captured by an uncredited Daniel Cudmore.
- Gorilla Grodd makes a cameo appearance in the Legacies episode "Hope Is Not the Goal".
- Gorilla Grodd will appear in the HBO Max series The People v. Gorilla Grodd, set in the DC Universe (DCU), portrayed by Jimmy Tatro.

==== Animation ====
Gorilla Grodd as he appears in Justice League

- Gorilla Grodd appears in the Super Friends franchise, voiced by Stanley Ralph Ross. This version is a member of Lex Luthor's Legion of Doom who developed a means of time travel for their use.
- Gorilla Grodd appears in series set in the DC Animated Universe (DCAU), voiced by Powers Boothe.
  - First appearing in Justice League, this version is Giganta's creator and a fugitive from Gorilla City, which he initially attempts to take revenge on before focusing his efforts on defeating the Justice League. In pursuit of this, he and Giganta recruit Killer Frost, Sinestro, Parasite, Shade, and Clayface to form the Secret Society, only to be defeated by the League and incarcerated. Additionally, Grodd initially derives his psychic powers from a helmet, but becomes able to use them without it after the Flash rewires the helmet to electrocute him.
  - Grodd appears in the final season of Justice League Unlimited. After breaking out of prison, he formed an expanded version of the Secret Society and reworked it to function as a supervillain cooperative against the similarly expanded Justice League and manipulate the Society members into facilitating his plan to turn all humans into apes. After the League foil his plans, Lex Luthor usurps Grodd as the Society's leader and holds him prisoner in hopes that Grodd will help resurrect Brainiac. While the Society travels into space to recover Brainiac's remains, Tala frees Grodd to start a mutiny. As the Society members enter a civil war between those loyal to Luthor and those with Grodd, Luthor and Grodd fight until the former turns the latter's powers on him and forces him out of the airlock into space.
- Gorilla Grodd appears in Batman: The Brave and the Bold, voiced by John DiMaggio.
  - Additionally, an unnamed, heroic, alternate reality, albino version of Grodd appears in the episode "Deep Cover for Batman!".
- Gorilla Grodd appears in Robot Chicken DC Comics Special 2: Villains in Paradise, voiced by Clancy Brown. This version is a member of the Legion of Doom and friends with Lena Luthor.
- Gorilla Grodd appears in Justice League Action, voiced again by David Sobolov.
- Gorilla Grodd appears in Harley Quinn, voiced by Diedrich Bader. This version is a member of the Legion of Doom.
  - Grodd makes non-speaking cameo appearances in Kite Man: Hell Yeah!.
- Gorilla Grodd makes a non-speaking cameo appearance in the Creature Commandos episode "Chasing Squirrels".

=== Film ===
- Gorilla Grodd makes a cameo appearance in Justice League: The New Frontier.
- Gorilla Grodd makes a cameo appearance in Superman/Batman: Public Enemies, voiced by Brian George.
- Gorilla Grodd appears in DC Super Friends: The Joker's Playhouse, voiced by Phil LaMarr.
- Gorilla Grodd appears in JLA Adventures: Trapped in Time, voiced by Travis Willingham. This version is a member, later the leader, of the Legion of Doom.
- Gorilla Grodd appears in Lego DC Comics Super Heroes: Justice League vs. Bizarro League, voiced by Kevin Michael Richardson.
- Gorilla Grodd appears in Lego DC Comics Super Heroes: Justice League: Attack of the Legion of Doom, voiced again by Kevin Michael Richardson. This version is a member of the Legion of Doom.
- Gorilla Grodd makes a non-speaking cameo appearance in Lego DC Comics Super Heroes: Aquaman – Rage of Atlantis.
- Gorilla Grodd appears in Batman Ninja, voiced by Takehito Koyasu in the Japanese version and Fred Tatasciore in the English dub.

=== Video games ===
- Gorilla Grodd appears in Justice League Heroes, voiced by Neil Kaplan.
- Gorilla Grodd appears as the first boss of Justice League Heroes: The Flash.
- Gorilla Grodd appears in Batman: The Brave and the Bold – The Videogame, voiced again by John DiMaggio.
- Gorilla Grodd appears as a boss in DC Universe Online, voiced by Jens Andersen.
- Gorilla Grodd makes a cameo appearance in Injustice: Gods Among Us via the Stryker's Island stage in the console and PC versions and as a support card in the mobile version.
- Gorilla Grodd appears as a character summon in Scribblenauts Unmasked: A DC Comics Adventure.
- Gorilla Grodd appears as a playable character in DC Unchained.
- Gorilla Grodd appears as a playable character in Injustice 2, voiced by Charles Halford. This version is the ruler of Gorilla City. Seeking to fill the power vacuum left by Superman's Regime, he forms the "Society" to conquer Earth and subdue mankind and allies with Brainiac, intending to eventually betray and kill him. While attempting to steal power from the Rock of Eternity, Grodd is defeated by Black Adam and Aquaman and killed by the latter.

==== Lego ====
- Gorilla Grodd appears as a downloadable character in Lego Batman 2: DC Super Heroes, voiced by Travis Willingham.
- Gorilla Grodd appears as a playable character in Lego Batman 3: Beyond Gotham, voiced by Ike Amadi.
- Gorilla Grodd appears in Lego DC Super-Villains, voiced again by David Sobolov. This version is a reluctant member of the Legion of Doom.

=== Miscellaneous ===
- Gorilla Grodd appears in issues #18 and #19 of the Young Justice tie-in comic book. This version was experimented on by the Brain and Ultra-Humanite, who enhanced his strength and intelligence using Kobra venom.
- The Injustice incarnation of Gorilla Grodd makes a cameo appearance in the Injustice: Gods Among Us prequel comic.
- Gorilla Grodd appears in DC Super Hero Girls and its tie-in films, voiced again by John DiMaggio. This version is the vice-principal of Super Hero High.
- Gorilla Grodd appears in DC X Sonic the Hedgehog #3.

== Reception ==
Gorilla Grodd was ranked 35th in IGN's list of 100 Greatest Comic Book Villains.

== See also ==
- List of fictional primates in comics
