= Jimmy Tatro =

American actor and comedian (born 1992)

- Born: James Richard Tatro; February 16, 1992 (age 34); Los Angeles, California, U.S.
- Education: University of Arizona (dropped out)
- Occupations: Actor; YouTuber
- Years active: 2011–present
- Partner(s): Zoey Deutch (2021–present; engaged)

YouTube information
- Channel: LifeAccordingToJimmy
- Subscribers: 3.33 million
- Views: 748.6 million
- Last updated: April 2026

James Richard Tatro (born February 16, 1992) is an American actor and YouTuber. He is the creator and star of the YouTube channel LifeAccordingToJimmy, which has more than 3.34 million subscribers and over 746 million video views. Tatro writes, produces and directs each of his video sketches with his friend, Christian A. Pierce.

Tatro has appeared in Grown Ups 2, 22 Jump Street, Blue Mountain State: The Rise of Thadland, Boo! A Madea Halloween, and Stuber. He also starred in the first season of the true-crime mockumentary American Vandal as Dylan Maxwell, which garnered him critical acclaim and a Critics Choice Award nomination. From 2021 to 2023, Tatro had a main role as Connor on the ABC sitcom Home Economics.

== Early life ==
Tatro attended Notre Dame High School in Sherman Oaks, California. He started making comical videos with friends in high school, and then continued to do so at the University of Arizona. He dropped out of college his junior year. While at Arizona he was a member of the Pi Kappa Phi fraternity.

== Career ==
Tatro has performed stand-up comedy across the country at comedy clubs and college campuses.

Tatro's career segued into movies in 2013 with a minor role in the Adam Sandler comedy Grown Ups 2. He then appeared opposite Jonah Hill and Channing Tatum in 2014's 22 Jump Street as Rooster. In 2016, he appeared in the film adaptation of Blue Mountain State.

In 2017, Tatro starred in the Netflix Original series American Vandal, a "true-crime satire that explores the aftermath of a costly high school prank that left twenty-seven faculty cars vandalized with phallic images." Tatro plays Dylan Maxwell, a student accused of vandalizing the cars, and focuses on the mystery of proving his innocence. The show satirizes the popular true-crime genre, such as the Netflix series Making a Murderer. Tatro received wide critical praise for his performance and was nominated for various critics awards.

On November 20, 2017, Tatro announced via social media that he joined the cast of Smallfoot, an animated comedy film as the character Thorp. The film was released in September 2018. The project marked Tatro's second collaboration with Channing Tatum, with whom he worked on 22 Jump Street.

In April 2018, Tatro was to star in NBC pilot Bright Futures. NBC did not pick the pilot up to series.

On November 14, 2018, it was announced that the second season of The Real Bros of Simi Valley, which premiered on Tatro's LifeAccordingToJimmy YouTube channel, would air on Facebook Watch. Tatro stars, executive produces, co-writes, and directs the series.

In December 2020, Home Economics was given a series order. Tatro plays Connor Hayworth, the wealthy owner of a private equity firm, who moves closer to his two siblings, one of whom is middle class while the other is broke. The show was cancelled in 2023 after three seasons.

=== LifeAccordingToJimmy ===
In 2011, Tatro created his YouTube channel, LifeAccordingToJimmy, with his creative partner, Christian Pierce, in which he uploads comedy skits. Tatro's videos have had numerous celebrity appearances, including: Angela Kinsey, David Henrie, Alexander Ludwig, Emily Osment, Darin Brooks, Milo Ventimiglia, Riff Raff, Pauly Shore, and Liliana Mumy.

In 2014, his YouTube channel was listed on New Media Rockstars Top 100 Channels, ranked at No. 92.

== Personal life ==
Tatro dated Emily Osment from 2013 to 2015. He has been in a relationship with actress Zoey Deutch since 2021. They announced their engagement in September 2025.

== Filmography ==
Key
†	Denotes films that have not yet been released

=== Film ===
Year	Title	Role	Notes
2013	Grown Ups 2	Frat Boy	
2013	Fighting Couple	Jimmy	Short film
2014	22 Jump Street	Rooster	
2015	How to Have Sex on a Plane	Lead Guy	Short film; also writer
2015	Air Bound	Matthew	English dub; Voice role
2016	Blue Mountain State: The Rise of Thadland	Dick Dawg	
2016	Internet Famous		
2016	FML	Bobby Fellows	
2016	Boo! A Madea Halloween	Sean	
2017	My College Roommate is DNCE		
2018	Super Troopers 2	Lance Stonebreaker	credited as James R. Tatro
2018	Camp Manna	Clayton Vance	
2018	Smallfoot	Thorp	Voice role
2019	Stuber	Richie Sandusky	
2019	Bad Education	Jim Boy McCarden	
2020	The King of Staten Island	Firefighter Savage	
2020	The Wolf of Snow Hollow	PJ Palfrey	
2021	Rumble	Lights Out McGinty	Voice role
2022	Diary of a Wimpy Kid: Rodrick Rules	Bill Walter	Voice role
2023	Theater Camp	Troy Rubinsky	Also executive producer
2023	The Machine	Young Bert	
2023	Strays	Finn the Rottweiler	Voice role
2024	The Real Bros of Simi Valley: The Movie	Xander Sanders	also director, screenwriter
2025	You're Cordially Invited	Dixon	
2025	California King	Wyatt	
2026	Scream 7	Scott	
2026	Mike & Nick & Nick & Alice	Jimmy Boy	
TBA	Action #1 †	Brian	
TBA	Judgment Day †	TBA	Post-production

=== Television and web series ===
Key
†	Denotes television productions that have not yet been released

Year	Title	Role	Notes
2011–present	LifeAccordingToJimmy	Himself	Web series
2013	Homemade Movies	Thug	Episode: "Tim Burton's I'm Batman"
2015	Lucas Bros. Moving Co.		Voice role; episode: "Escape from Momma"
2016	Betch	Himself / Guy	Host; 1 episode
2017	Drive Share	Passenger	Episode: "Drive Share Black"
2017–2018	American Vandal	Dylan Maxwell	Main cast (season 1); guest role (season 2); Nominated—Critics' Choice Television Award for Best Actor in a Movie/Miniseries; Nominated—IGN Summer Movie Award for Best Comedic TV Performance; Nominated—Gold Derby Award for Best Miniseries/TV Movie Actor
2017–2020	The Real Bros of Simi Valley	Xander Sanders	Main cast Also co-creator, co-writer, director, and executive producer
2018	The Guest Book	Bodhi	Main cast (season 2)
2018	Angie Tribeca	Paul Boneson	Episode: "Joystick Luck Club"
2018–2019	Modern Family	Bill	6 episodes
2019	Charmed	Gideon	Episode: "Touched by a Demon"
2019–2020	Tacoma FD	Sergeant Shuck	3 episodes
2019–2021	Fast & Furious Spy Racers	Mitch	Voice role; 7 episodes
2020–2022	The Mighty Ones	Leaf (Bucky)	Main cast; voice role
2021	The Now	Hal	Main cast
2021–2023	Home Economics	Connor	Main cast; also directed 1 episode
2022	The Afterparty	Officer Kleyes	Episode: "Danner"
2023	HouseBroken	Trey	Voice role; episode: "Who's Obsessed (A Lifetime Original)"
2024	Family Guy	Cool Kid #1	Voice role; episode: "Teacher's Heavy Pet"
2024	Monsters at Work	Skyler	Voice role; episode: "Field of Screams"
2026	The Hawk	Lance Hawkins	Main cast
2027	The People v. Gorilla Grodd †	Gorilla Grodd	Main role; filming

=== Music videos ===
Year	Title	Artist(s)	Role	Ref.
2018	"Freaky Friday"	Lil Dicky featuring Chris Brown	Fan	
2026	"Do Me Right"	Mr. Fantasy	Himself	
