= Michelle Theriault Boots =

Michelle Theriault Boots is an American academic and journalist who is the Atwood Chair of Journalism at the University of Alaska Anchorage.

== Life ==
Theriault Boots earned a bachelor's degree in politics from Willamette University. Her work on the student newspaper and an internship at a local news outlet confirmed her career path and led to her first professional reporting jobs. She completed a master's degree in literary nonfiction at the University of Oregon.

Theriault Boots worked for newspapers in Palm Springs, California, Bellingham, Washington, and Salem, Oregon. She reported internationally in Ghana and, as an Overseas Press Club fellow for the Associated Press, in Johannesburg. In August 2026, Theriault Boots was named the Atwood Chair of Journalism at the University of Alaska Anchorage for the 2026 to 2027 academic year.
