= Tétreault-Gadoury v Canada (Employment and Immigration Commission) =

Leading Supreme Court of Canada decision

Tétreault-Gadoury v Canada (Employment and Immigration Commission), [1991] 2 S.C.R. 22 is a leading Supreme Court of Canada decision on the jurisdiction of tribunals to hear Charter challenges. The Court held that the board of referees under unemployment insurance legislation was not able to hear an equality rights challenge for benefits that were denied to the claimant who was over the age of sixty-five.

== See also ==
- List of Supreme Court of Canada cases (Dickson Court)
- Cuddy Chicks Ltd. v. Ontario (Labour Relations Board), [1991] 2 S.C.R. 5
