= American Vandal =

Mockumentary crime series by Netflix

- Genre: Comedy drama; Mockumentary; Satire; Teen drama
- Created by: Dan Perrault; Tony Yacenda
- Directed by: Tony Yacenda
- Starring: Tyler Alvarez; Griffin Gluck; Jimmy Tatro
- Country of origin: United States
- Original language: English
- No. of seasons: 2
- No. of episodes: 16

Production
- Executive producers: Tony Yacenda; Dan Perrault; Dan Lagana; Joe Farrell; Ari Lubet; Josh Lieberman; Michael Rotenberg
- Cinematography: Adam Bricker
- Running time: 26–42 minutes
- Production companies: Woodhead Entertainment; One Man Canoe; 3 Arts Entertainment; Funny or Die; CBS Television Studios

Original release
- Network: Netflix
- Release: September 15, 2017 – September 14, 2018

American Vandal is an American mockumentary television series created by Dan Perrault and Tony Yacenda that premiered on September 15, 2017, on Netflix. The series is a parody of true crime documentaries such as Making a Murderer and Serial. On October 26, 2018, Netflix canceled the series after two seasons.

It received mostly positive critical reviews, was nominated for a Primetime Emmy Award, and won a Peabody Award.

== Premise ==
The first season follows the aftermath of a costly high school prank that left 27 faculty cars vandalized with phallic images. Senior class clown Dylan Maxwell is accused of the crime by the school. He is expelled, but an investigation into the incident is launched by sophomore Peter Maldonado, with help from his friend Sam Ecklund, to uncover whether Dylan was the one truly behind the crime.

The second season follows Peter and Sam as they investigate a new crime at a Catholic private high school after their cafeteria's lemonade is contaminated with maltitol by someone calling themselves "The Turd Burglar."

== Cast and characters ==
=== Main ===
- Tyler Alvarez as Peter Maldonado, the co-anchor of Hanover High School's morning show and the writer and director of true-crime documentary series American Vandal.
- Griffin Gluck as Sam Ecklund, a co-producer of American Vandal and Peter's closest friend.
- Jimmy Tatro as Dylan Maxwell (season 1), the primary suspect of the prank at Hanover High School.

=== Recurring ===
==== Season 1 ====
- Joe Farrell as Jared Hixenbaugh
- Jessica Juarez as Brianna "Ganj" Gagne
- G. Hannelius as Christa Carlyle
- Camille Hyde as Gabi Granger
- Camille Ramsey as Mackenzie Wagner
- Eduardo Franco as Spencer Diaz
- Lukas Gage as Brandon Galloway
- Lou Wilson as Lucas Wiley
- Calum Worthy as Alex Trimboli
- Cody Wai-Ho Lee as Ming Zhang
- Saxon Sharbino as Sara Pearson
- P.L. Brown as Mr. Baxter
- Gabriela Fresquez as Sophia Gutierrez
- Ryan O'Flanagan as Steven "Kraz" Krazanski
- Karly Rothenberg as Erin Shapiro
- Aylin Bayramoglu as Madison Kaplan
- Brian Perrault as Zack Rutherford

==== Season 2 ====
- Travis Tope as Kevin McClain
- Melvin Gregg as DeMarcus Tillman
- Taylor Dearden as Chloe Lyman
- DeRon Horton as Lou Carter
- Adam Ray as Officer Crowder
- Sarah Burns as Ms. Angela Montgomery
- Jay Lee as Tanner Bassett
- Bellina Logan as Detective Carla Dickey
- Barbara Deering as Ms. Cathy Wexler
- Miles J. Harvey as Paul Schnorrenberg
- Jeremy Culhane as Grayson Wentz
- La'Charles Trask as Perry Coleman
- Susan Ruttan as Patricia McClain
- Jonathan Saks as Drew Pankratz
- Kiah Stern as Jenna Hawthorne
- Nathaniel J. Potvin as Trevor "Gonzo" Gonzalez
- Elisha Henig as Myles Crimmins
- Jeanine Jackson as Proud Nun
- Cayleb Long as "Hot Janitor"
- Connor Williams as Ethan Owens
- Matt Bennett as Gavin Landers
- Taylor Misiak as Abby Samuels
- Isaac Lamb as Matthew Gesualdi
- Luke Wyngarden as Nick Bradley

== Episodes ==
Series overview
Season	Episodes	Originally released
1	8	September 15, 2017
2	8	September 14, 2018

=== Season 1 (2017) ===
No. overall	No. in season	Title	Directed by	Written by	Original release date
1	1	"Hard Facts: Vandalism and Vulgarity"	Tony Yacenda	Tony Yacenda & Dan Perrault	September 15, 2017
On March 15, 2016, at Hanover High School in Oceanside, California, 27 faculty cars with phallic images drawn on them were found in the school's parking lot. The school board accuses senior class clown, Dylan Maxwell, relying on a consistent testimony from witness Alex Trimboli, which results in Dylan's expulsion. However, Dylan claims he didn't draw the penises on the cars. An investigation led by sophomore Peter Maldonado and his friend Sam Ecklund takes place to exonerate Dylan from his expulsion. Peter claims certain points that the board used to expel Dylan, including his history as a known phallic drawer, were true but counterargues against them with contrasting evidence, such as the phallic drawings on the cars lacking ball hairs — one little detail that Dylan always drew on his previous phallic drawings. Peter and Sam start to question Trimboli's integrity of his testimony and his previously exaggerated comments on a sexual encounter with popular girl Sara Pearson and binge-drinking at a party thrown a few weeks earlier.
2	2	"A Limp Alibi"	Tony Yacenda	Dan Lagana	September 15, 2017
To test Trimboli's integrity, Peter and Sam go with Sam's friend Gabi Granger to Camp Miniwaka, a camp resort where Trimboli states that he had met Pearson and had their sexual encounter. Speculation and evidence imply that Trimboli lied about having sex with Pearson. They also look into Dylan's whereabouts during the incident on March 15; Dylan and his friends, known as The Wayback Boys, pulled a prank on member Lucas Wiley's neighbor, Mr. Janson. During the prank, Dylan receives a message from his girlfriend, Mackenzie Wagner, causing him to lie to his friends and leave Lucas' house, which explains the conflicting testimonies of Dylan's whereabouts that contribute to his expulsion. Dylan also claims that during the prank, he left Janson a voicemail, which Peter unsuccessfully attempts to retrieve from Janson. They also initiate an experiment where they test whether the phallic drawings and erasure of security footage can happen tightly within the 31-minute timeframe Dylan was unaccounted for, with the verdict stating that the incident—at 29.1 minutes—is closely possible to perform within the timeframe.
3	3	"Nailed"	Tony Yacenda	Mike Rosolio	September 15, 2017
Getting increasingly frustrated with Dylan's incoherent integrity, Peter decides to interview Dylan's Spanish teacher, Mrs. Shapiro, the most beloved teacher at Hanover High, in hopes of getting a new perspective on Dylan's disrespectful and childlike manner in class. Shapiro believes she was the main target in the phallic incident, as her car was not only spray painted but one of her tires was slashed. Peter suspects foul play, as earlier in the aftermath of the phallic incident, at a senior assembly, Vice Principal Keene threatened to cancel off-campus lunch and the senior prom. Shapiro intended to keep them intact, which had influenced Trimboli's testimony against Dylan. Mr. Krazanski, one of Shapiro's colleagues, states that Shapiro is the one who brought up the idea of canceling off-campus lunch and the prom and that her intentions to bring them back was a ruse to strong-arm people into accusing Dylan. More reasonable doubt arises after Peter and Sam uncover a report concerning a nail that was in Shapiro's car that actually flattened the tire, debunking the slashed tire statement and leaving Peter unconvinced about Shapiro's statements. Shapiro gives Peter the cold shoulder when he tries to ask her more questions concerning Dylan.
4	4	"Growing Suspicion"	Tony Yacenda	Kevin McManus & Matthew McManus	September 15, 2017
Intent on narrowing down his list of suspects, Peter constructs a theory concerning the Morning Show, the daily Hanover school show for which Peter, Sam, and Dylan are part of the crew. He states that one of the nine school show crew members, including senior school president Christa Carlyle, might have something to do with the phallic incident. Peter digs deep into every member's motives and alibis until he finally gets to Sam, whom Peter theorizes to have drawn the penises on the cars to get Gabi's attention. However, these assumptions frustrate a confused Sam, who angrily steps out and scolds Peter for being too easy on Dylan, the investigation's primary suspect. Then, Peter theorizes that Dylan could have drawn the penises to get Mackenzie's attention due to a breakup that happened three days before the phallic incident. However, Dylan continues to state his innocence in the face of Peter's new assumptions, leaving Peter in the cold until he eventually gets a call from Janson's daughter concerning a "Kiefer Sutherland-type" voicemail.
5	5	"Premature Theories"	Tony Yacenda	Amy Pocha & Seth Cohen	September 15, 2017
Peter returns to Janson's house to get the voicemail from Janson's daughter, who angrily rips it up, annoyed about being called nonstop by American Vandal's growing fandom. This causes Peter to look back at a previous party held at a student's grandmother's house — known colloquially as "Nana's Party" — using video footage from those involved to find out if Dylan and his friends, who attended the party, mentioned about planning the phallic incident, with unsuccessful results. He instead finds evidence that debunks Trimboli's binge-drinking claim. He also notices a spray paint can, used by Gabi's boyfriend Brandon Galloway on a towel as a promposal, that went missing afterward and later popped up on March 15 to be the drawing weapon. Peter reconciles with Sam after their fallout. With Gabi's help, Sam theorizes that there were three cars — belonging to Keene, physics teacher Mr. Maeda, and football coach Rafferty — hit with spray paint splatter and deduces that the owners were the main targets, giving them a new lead on the case.
6	6	"Gag Order"	Tony Yacenda	Jess Meyer	September 15, 2017
During an anti-bullying demonstration, an obscene protest led by Carlyle and several students infuriates Keene, who bans the filming of American Vandal on school grounds, forcing Peter and Sam to work off-campus as they narrow down the suspects regarding the latter's splatter theory. They talk to Rafferty and then Maeda in his classroom, where Sam comes across a confiscated iPad belonging to Pearson. Sam finds texts that reveal Galloway as the one who got a handjob from Pearson, revealing Galloway's infidelity and validating Trimboli's dishonesty. Gabi finds out and angrily walks out on Peter and Sam. After finding out that Hanover High's faculty files haven't been updated online since 2012, the duo unsuccessfully attempts to ask Keene if they can look into the files, which results in the duo's temporary suspension. The online attention from the documentary's fandom has them reinstated back to school, and the filming ban lifted. Keene reluctantly gives them access to the hard copies of the faculty files. An anonymous person gives Peter and Sam a flash drive that shows images of Rafferty's office demolished a few days before the phallic incident, along with the message: "Stick your dick somewhere else" written on the whiteboard, convincing them that Coach Rafferty is the main target.
7	7	"Climax"	Tony Yacenda	Lauren Herstik	September 15, 2017
Peter and Sam look up the faculty files and find a student complaint report filed against Rafferty for "inappropriate conduct to a student." Hearing about their investigations, Rafferty tells them that the reason for these complaints was that he had a relationship with a student's mom and didn't identify her to keep it confidential, provoking the duo to search and cross-reference the identity of the woman based on Rafferty's Facebook friend list and a list Sam created detailing Hanover's hottest moms, leading them to Mackenzie Wagner's mom. This newfound clue convinces Peter that Mackenzie is the most likely culprit. Peter tries to explain this to Dylan, who rebuffs him. Peter deduces that Dylan and Mackenzie worked together to draw the penises on the cars, provoking Peter to have a volatile argument with Dylan. He then confronts Mackenzie and accuses her of the drawings, causing Mackenzie to suffer an emotional breakdown and chastise Peter for accusing her; she also accuses him of making the documentary as a frustrated response to him being a "nobody." She later manages to prove her innocence by giving Peter a link to a video on her Twitch live stream, which was shown to Dylan. Peter asks Dylan who the video needs to be shown to, and a shocked and distraught Dylan responds with one line: "Everyone."
8	8	"Clean Up"	Tony Yacenda	Matthew McManus & Kevin McManus	September 15, 2017
The video reveals Mackenzie's infidelity as an unaware Dylan appears in the video within the timeframe of the phallic incident, proving his innocence and successfully exonerating him. Dylan is reinstated at school, though his newfound popularity wears off soon: Shapiro rejects him, Mackenzie breaks up with him, and he receives a rejection letter from his college of choice - Boulder. Peter and Sam join him at a party after the senior prom. The following happens: Pearson confronts Peter over the inclusion of her personal information in the documentary; Sam reconciles with Gabi; Dylan feels insulted by his portrayal on American Vandal as he watches it for the first time; and lastly, Ming Zhang, one of the nine students who were part of the Morning Show, chokes on beer and is saved by CPR. This incident catches Sam's eye, as Carlyle demonstrates her lack of CPR knowledge, contradicting her alibi that she was doing CPR training at the time of the phallic incident. Sam and Peter deduce that Carlyle erased the security footage while her boyfriend, Van Delorey, did the drawings. It's also revealed that she has a grudge against Coach Rafferty and filed student complaints against him. Carlyle rebuffs Peter when he confronts her after senior graduation, leaving the culprit's identity unclear. Dylan is arrested for drawing a penis on Shapiro's property and is visited by Peter, whom he opens up to about being a "fuckup," succumbing to everyone's preconceived notion of him. Peter reminisces about the documentary and reminds audiences not to let high school define their lives.

=== Season 2 (2018) ===
No. overall	No. in season	Title	Directed by	Written by	Original release date
9	1	"The Brownout"	Tony Yacenda	Tony Yacenda and Dan Perrault	September 14, 2018
On November 6, 2017, at a Catholic high school named St. Bernardine in Bellevue, Washington, an incident occurred during the school lunch in which several students drank the lemonade offered, unaware that they were tainted with laxatives, causing them to spontaneously defecate across the school grounds at considerable expense. An anonymous person, known as The Turd Burglar, claims responsibility for these crimes on social media. Security and school officials accuse school outcast Kevin McClain of the crimes, based on a statement from Kevin's best friend Tanner Bassett, who was suspicious of Kevin before the incident. As a result, Kevin is expelled, forcing him to go into house arrest and leaving him awaiting criminal charges. Meanwhile, back at Oceanside, reeling off the success of American Vandal, Peter and Sam are contacted by Kevin's friend Chloe Lyman, who informs them of the ongoing case and asks for their help. Peter and Sam accept Chloe's request and fly to Bellevue to investigate and exonerate Kevin, staying at Chloe's house during filming. They interview students afflicted by the laxatives and Kevin's grandmother, who counterargues the accusations against Kevin, with him being one of those afflicted students.
10	2	"#2"	Tony Yacenda	Dan Lagana	September 14, 2018
Peter and Sam then visit Kevin, who's on house arrest in his grandmother's house. Kevin states his innocence and that his interrogators coerced his testimony to confess to the Brownout and two other incidents that followed afterward: "The Poop Piñata," which occurred when a piñata was hit during a class celebration of Vonnegut Day, that caused feces put into it to splatter on surrounding students; and "The Shit Launcher," which occurred at a school assembly when cheerleaders fired t-shirt cannons, only to realize they unknowingly fired out cat feces that spread and afflicted students. Peter and Sam figure out that the laxative used was maltitol and go to a store frequented by Kevin and Tanner, only to realize that none of the laxatives the store provides contain maltitol, making Tanner's statement inconclusive. They also learn about Kevin and Tanner's fallout as friends following a skip day incident that provoked Tanner to testify against Kevin. Despite Peter and Sam's doubt about Kevin's innocence, they get a new lead when Chloe gives them new information stating that she noticed someone possessing a Turd Burglar card: the school's basketball champion, DeMarcus Tillman.
11	3	"Leaving a Mark"	Tony Yacenda	Kevin McManus & Matthew McManus	September 14, 2018
Peter and Sam head down to the basketball court in St. Bernardine to interview Tillman. It's revealed that DeMarcus is shown to be a generous person with an enthusiastic reputation among his peers and classmates and has special privileges and access to certain restricted areas – a reason that would give a motive to DeMarcus if he was the Turd Burglar. Peter and Sam then look back into previous events, such as an incident in which someone stole the school mascot costume and posted himself in the costume on Instagram as "Sir Fux-a-lot" to sexually harass cheerleader Paige Burton. The culprit was Tillman's former friend, Perry Coleman, a former student and athlete. The story contrasts with Grayson Wentz, a student expelled for using school computers to post vulgar tweets on Twitter. The duo deduces that St. Bernardine would nevertheless cover for athletes who enthusiastically contribute to the school at the cost of expelling outcasts like Kevin and Wentz. Suddenly, Peter gets a surprising text from The Turd Burglar, telling him that he is doing "a shitty job" at finding him.
12	4	"Shit Talk"	Tony Yacenda	Mark Stasenko	September 14, 2018
Peter and Sam come into contact with The Turd Burglar and also come across the circumstantial evidence of a possible fourth crime that was anticipated but seemingly didn't take place on December 4. Their reasonable doubt about Kevin's innocence and Chloe's eyewitness account increases, prompting them to interview Kevin and Chloe about their friendship. They also look into evidence of an incident involving the iOS 11 glitch that affected iPhones, causing them to replace the letter "I" with "A?", which narrows down the list of suspects due to the glitch's presence in the Turd Burglar's social media posts. Sam and Peter access the school's anonymous tip box to find recurring names, finding three: Drew Pankratz, Jenna Hawthorne, and Paul Schnorrenberg. They investigate their alibis, motives, and personalities: Pankratz and Hawthorne's alibis are solid, and a clue into Schnorrenberg's motives leads Sam and Peter to have an interview with his teacher, Ms. Montgomery. A chance observance causes Sam to sneak into the teacher's lounge after noticing an advent calendar surprisingly similar to one posted online from the Turd Burglar's account after the presumed timeframe of the fourth crime, making him and Peter deduce that a fourth crime did happen and the calendar was used for that crime.
13	5	"Wiped Clean"	Tony Yacenda	Seth Cohen & Amy Pocha	September 14, 2018
Influenced by their new deductions and leads, Peter and Sam find someone who potentially had an eyewitness account of the fourth possible crime: the former janitor – dubbed "Hot Janitor" – whom most of the women attending school were infatuated with. He transferred to another school a day after the fourth crime. The duo tracks him down, and the janitor mentions an incident in which a teacher ate a piece of chocolate-covered cat feces put into the advent calendar, leading him and another teacher to vomit. Peter and Sam deduce that the teacher who ate the piece was Mr. Fernandez, who vomited alongside one unspecified coworker. This caught Wexler's attention, prompting her to call the Hot Janitor to clean up the mess and coerce everyone to keep quiet about it, covering up the incident and validating Kevin's innocence. Peter and Sam call in Chloe to discuss with Wexler, who strongarms Chloe to keep quiet. Chloe visits a distraught Kevin, who tells her to stop helping with the investigation. Kevin suggests Peter place a camera in his locker, adjacent to the teacher's lounge, to observe who walks in and out. Surprisingly, they encounter someone unusual: Lou Carter, DeMarcus's friend.
14	6	"All Backed Up"	Tony Yacenda	Jaboukie Young-White	September 14, 2018
After seeing Lou walking in and out of the teacher's lounge, Peter and Sam further deduce that Lou is the most likely culprit, with DeMarcus possibly helping or covering for him. They consult with Perry Coleman, who confides to Sam and Peter about his friendship with DeMarcus that was torn apart by Lou, who's conspiring with DeMarcus' dad to coerce DeMarcus to go to Oregon for college and not UCLA where Coleman is attending. He explains that Lou was the one who called the cops at the skip day party, which prompted Tanner to testify against Kevin. The duo confronts Lou, who refuses to cooperate and confides to Tanner about Kevin's innocence of not calling the cops. Tanner reconciles with Kevin afterward. Six hours after the duo's talk with Lou and DeMarcus, Trevor "Gonzo" Gonzalez, DeMarcus' and Lou's teammate, appears to them bruised. Gonzo confides to Sam and Peter, where he assumes that DeMarcus and Lou were missing and put the feces in the shirt guns just before the Shit Launcher incident and is confronted by Lou, who beats him up. Later on, security footage reveals that DeMarcus and Lou encounter and become hostile to Kevin outside a nearby convenience store.
15	7	"Shit Storm"	Tony Yacenda	Jess Meyer	September 14, 2018
Kevin contacts Peter and Sam, claiming that he'll no longer be involved in the making of the documentary and blocks all contact with them. They come across security footage at the convenience store that Kevin frequents, where they notice DeMarcus and Lou confronting Kevin outside. Lou tells Peter that he drove DeMarcus to the doctor for his ankle problem and had his car rammed by Jenna Hawthorne, debunking her previous claims about her alibi at her internship. Sam and Peter then find texts that were sent to their phones when DeMarcus and Lou confronted Kevin, exonerating them. Peter and Sam deduce that Jenna is the Turd Burglar. They confront her; she reveals herself as the one behind the Shit Launcher incident, stating that she was blackmailed by a girl named Brooke Wheeler, a girl Jenna met on social media and flirted with in texts. Jenna points to Wheeler as the Turd Burglar. Peter and Sam head to Oregon to track down Brooke Wheeler, who is revealed to be Abby Samuels, a college student whose pictures were used for the fake Wheeler account, revealing that the Turd Burglar is a catfish.
16	8	"The Dump"	Tony Yacenda	Kevin McManus & Matthew McManus	September 14, 2018
Abby confides to Peter that, after breaking her phone, she encountered expelled student Grayson Wentz, a phone repair worker, revealing Wentz as the Turd Burglar, exonerating Kevin. Enraged after being expelled, Grayson decided to target people through his Wheeler account to catfish people as a part of his scheme to take revenge against the school for expelling him. Grayson performs a fifth and final crime, "The Dump," where he leaks compromising pictures to his Wheeler account that he used to blackmail victims, all of whom took nude selfies. The victims were Jenna (The Shit Launcher), Drew (who also had a video of him leaked), DeMarcus (The Poop Piñata), and Mr. Gisualdi (the teacher that got Grayson expelled; he put the feces piece in the advent calendar). Drew is the only one who refuses to comply with Grayson's demands, and uncovered evidence reveals Kevin as the Brownout culprit. Kevin expresses massive guilt and heartbreak over Grayson's manipulation of him. Grayson is sentenced to prison for two years, DeMarcus and Jenna are both sentenced to community service, Mr. Gisualdi's teaching license is revoked, Ms. Wexler is forced to resign, and Kevin remains sentenced to in-house arrest for nine months. Sometime later, things have grown optimistic: DeMarcus rebuffs Lou and announces on National Signing Day his plans to attend Villanova University in Pennsylvania while working part-time as a coach at a basketball youth camp as part of his community service; Kevin plans to attend public high school after his sentence and has reconciled with Chloe and Tanner, reforming their musical band. Peter reminisces and reminds audiences to stay close to their loved ones and to be content with who they are as people.

== Production ==
=== Development ===
Creators Tony Yacenda and Dan Perrault sought to create a satire of true crime documentaries such as Serial, Making a Murderer, and The Jinx. Yacenda and Perrault came up with the idea for the show in early 2016 and subsequently pitched it to Netflix, which agreed to distribute the show after being assured that the show would be "more than just a dick joke sketch." Yacenda and Perrault, who had previously worked on short-form videos for outlets such as Funny or Die and CollegeHumor, were joined by showrunner Dan Lagana, who had most recently worked on the television series Deadbeat. Lagana took charge of hiring writers for the show, choosing individuals with relatively little experience in writing for television.

The creators developed the central mystery in the course of writing the show, and sought to strike a balance between humor and the creation of an engrossing mystery.

On August 3, 2017, it was announced that Netflix had ordered and produced a new mockumentary series entitled American Vandal and that it was set to premiere on September 15, 2017. The series was created by Tony Yacenda and Daniel Perrault who were set to executive produce alongside Dan Lagana, Joe Farrell, Ari Lubet, Josh Lieberman, and Michael Rotenberg. Lagana was expected to act as showrunner on the series as well. Production companies involved with the series include CBS Television Studios, Funny or Die and 3 Arts Entertainment.

Shortly after the release of the first season, Yacenda and Perrault discussed the possibility of a second season, with the same documentary crew creating a documentary on a different crime. On October 26, 2017, it was announced that Netflix had renewed the series for a second season. On August 21, 2018, it was announced that the second season would premiere on September 14, 2018. On October 26, 2018, it was announced that Netflix had canceled the series after two seasons, however it was also reported that producers intend to shop the program to other venues.

=== Casting ===
In casting the show, the creators avoided stunt casting, instead seeking actors who best fit the roles and had the ability to improvise. Alongside the initial series announcement, it was reported that the series' cast would include Tyler Alvarez, Jimmy Tatro, Griffin Gluck, Camille Hyde, Eduardo Franco, Jessica Juarez, Lou Wilson, Camille Ramsey, Calum Worthy, Lukas Gage and G. Hannelius.

On March 14, 2018, it was announced that Travis Tope and Melvin Gregg had been cast in the series' lead roles for season two. On April 4, 2018, it was announced that Adam Ray had joined the cast in a recurring capacity. On June 14, 2018, Tony Yacenda, Dan Lagana, and Dan Perrault confirmed that Alvarez and Gluck would return as Peter and Sam, investigating a new crime in a Catholic high school. On August 21, 2018, it was announced that Taylor Dearden and DeRon Horton had joined the main cast of season two.

== Release ==
On August 3, 2017, the official trailer for season one was released. On August 21, 2018, the official trailer for season two was released.

== Reception ==
=== Critical response ===
==== Season 1 ====
The first season of the series was met with critical acclaim upon release. On Rotten Tomatoes, the first season holds an approval rating of 98% based on 49 reviews, with an average rating of 8.3/10. The site's consensus reads, "American Vandal pays satirical dividends while also working as a genuinely absorbing mystery that offers thought-provoking commentary on modern entertainment." On Metacritic, the series has a weighted average score of 75 out of 100, based on reviews from 10 critics, indicating "generally favorable reviews".

Writing for The Ringer, Mark Titus praised the show's subtle humor, engrossing plot, and realistic representation of high school. Robert Lloyd of the Los Angeles Times described American Vandal as a "perfectly proportioned pastiche" of true crime documentaries. Steve Greene of IndieWire praised the "incredible sense of authenticity" in the performances and the series's exploration of the popularity of the true crime genre.

The series has also been praised for its attention to detail when depicting social media interactions. Writing for VICE, Shailee Koranne described American Vandal's portrayal of social media as "absolutely accurate and incredibly nuanced."

American Vandal was honored with a Peabody Award for its first season on April 19, 2018. Calling it a "surprisingly insightful rumination on contemporary life... the show also offers a look at how the ethical questions of the true crime genre intersect with the harsh realities of being a teenager in the age of social media."

==== Season 2 ====
On Rotten Tomatoes, the second season holds an approval rating of 98% on an average rating of 8.1/10, based on 50 reviews. The site's consensus reads, "American Vandal trades one type of potty humor for another in an ambitious second season that manages to double down on the explicit gags while subtly addressing serious social issues." On Metacritic, the season received a weighted average score of 76 out of 100, based on reviews from 13 critics, indicating "generally favorable reviews".

=== Awards and nominations ===
Year	Award	Category	Nominee	Result	Ref.
2018	Critics' Choice Television Awards	Best Limited Series	American Vandal	Nominated	
2018	Critics' Choice Television Awards	Best Actor in Limited Series or Movie Made for Television	Jimmy Tatro	Nominated	
2018	Writers Guild of America Awards	New Series	Seth Cohen, Lauren Herstik, Dan Lagana, Kevin McManus, Matthew McManus, Jessica Meyer, Dan Perrault, Amy Pocha, Mike Rosolio, Tony Yacenda	Nominated	
2018	Peabody Awards	Entertainment honorees	American Vandal	Won	
2018	Primetime Emmy Awards	Outstanding Writing for a Limited Series, Movie, or Dramatic Special	Kevin McManus and Matthew McManus (for "Clean Up")	Nominated	
2019	Critics' Choice Television Awards	Best Limited Series	American Vandal	Nominated	
