= Action Comics 1000 =

Comic book issue

Action Comics #1000
- Standard cover to Action Comics #1000 (Early June 2018) with art by Jim Lee (pencils), Scott Williams (inks), and Hi-Fi Design (colors)

Publication information
- Publisher: DC Comics
- Genre: Superhero
- Publication date: April 18, 2018 (on sale date); Early June 2018 (cover date)

Action Comics #1000 (cover dated Early June 2018) is the 1,007th issue of the original run of the comic book/magazine series Action Comics (after special #0 and #1,000,000 tie-ins to Zero Hour: Crisis in Time! and DC One Million respectively; a second #0 in 2012; and #23.1, #23.2, #23.3, #23.4 in 2013). It features several Superman stories from a variety of creators, including previously unpublished artwork by Curt Swan, who drew Superman for nearly four decades. It was a commercial and critical success, being the most-ordered comic of the month.

== Contents ==
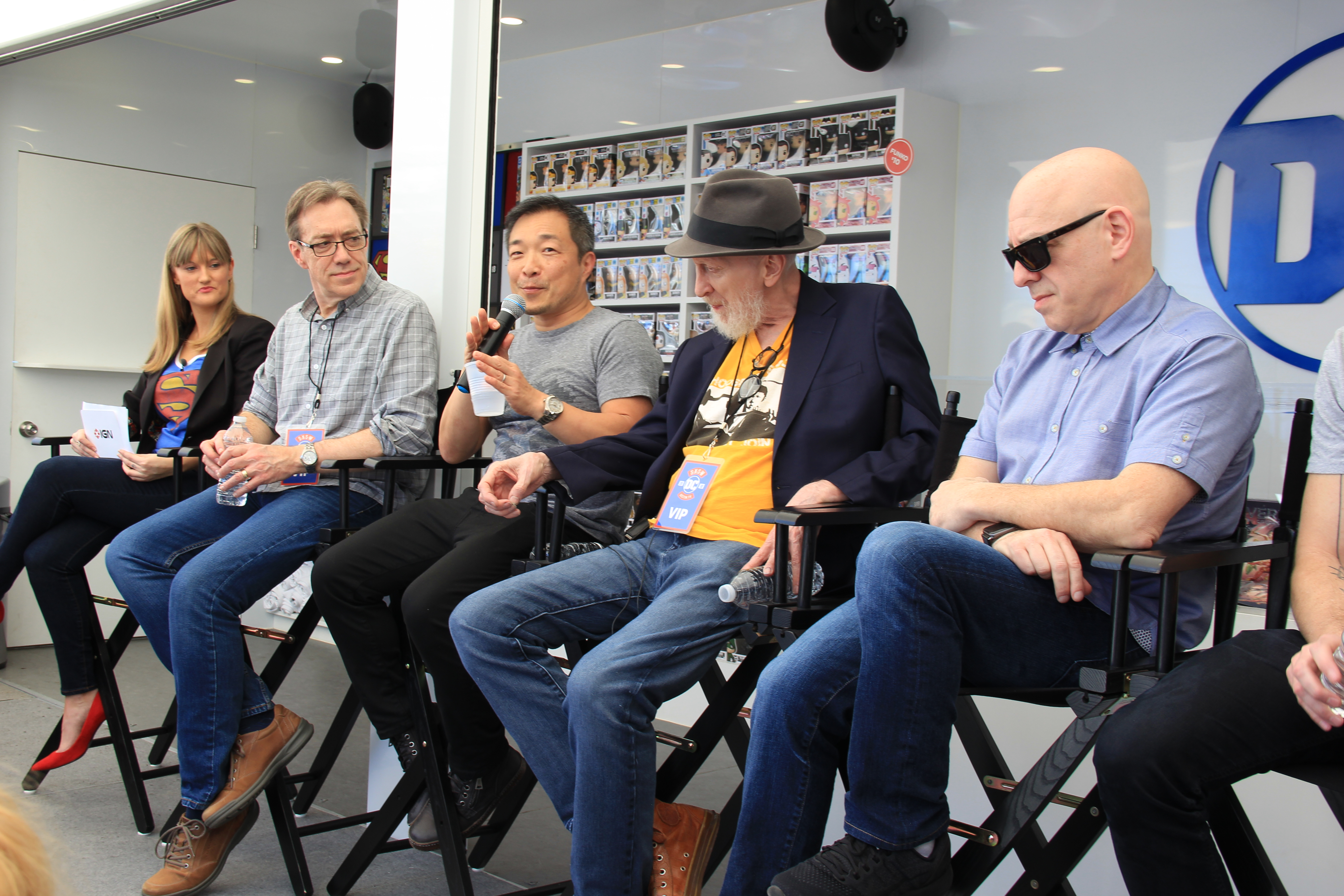
IGN's Laura Prudom (far left) hosts a panel at 2018's South by Southwest convention discussing Superman's 80th anniversary and the release of Action Comics #1000, with (left to right): Dan Jurgens, Jim Lee, Frank Miller, and Brian Michael Bendis.

Action Comics #1000 is an anthology, and contains several Superman stories, mostly around five to 10 pages, showcasing different eras of Superman's publication history and fictional life:

- "From the City Who Has Everything" (Dan Jurgens, writer and penciller; Norm Rapmund, inker; Hi Fi Design, colorist; Rob Leigh, letterer) is a celebration of Superman hosted by his home city of Metropolis, modeled after Jurgens' previous work on "The Death of Superman", the Lois & Clark: The New Adventures of Superman episode "I'm Seeing Through You", and Alan Moore and Dave Gibbons' "For the Man Who Has Everything".
- "Never-Ending Battle" (Peter J. Tomasi, writer; Patrick Gleason, penciller and inker; Alejandro Sanchez, colorist; and Tom Napolitano, letterer) has splash pages of Superman from various fictional universes and media (such as the 1940s cartoons, the film Superman and the Mole Men, the DC Animated Universe and the comic Kingdom Come set in an alternate future timeline) making his way home to his family: Lois Lane, Jon Kent, and Krypto.
- "An Enemy Within" (Marv Wolfman, writer; Curt Swan, penciller; Butch Guice and Kurt Schaffenberger, inkers; Hi-Fi, colorist; and Rob Leigh, letterer) repurposes unpublished art by Swan with the Metropolis Police Department talking down a hostage taker.
- "The Game" (Paul Levitz, writer; Neal Adams, penciller and inker; Hi-Fi Design, colorist; and Dave Sharpe, letterer) is a digital-only story that was published in the hardcover Action Comics: 80 Years of Superman and has a chess match between Superman and Lex Luthor.
- "The Car" (Geoff Johns and Richard Donner, writers; Olivier Coipel, penciller and inker; Alejandro Sanchez, colorist; and Nick Napolitano, letterer) follows from the story and cover of Action Comics #1 as Superman follows gangster Butch Mason to get his car repaired.
- "The Fifth Season" (Scott Snyder, writer; Rafael Albuquerque, penciller and inker; Dave McCaig, colorist; and Tom Napolitano, letterer) has Superman and Luthor meeting at a planetarium.
- "Of Tomorrow" (Tom King, writer; Clay Mann, penciller and inker; Jordan Bellaire, colorist; and John Workman, letterer) features Superman five billion years in the future, as Earth's sun cools and expands from a yellow star into a red giant, thus robbing him of his power source. He takes the opportunity to say goodbye to Ma and Pa Kent and thank them for raising him. This is one of two stories DC published digitally prior to the comics' release.
- "Five Minutes" (Louise Simonson, writer; Jerry Ordway, penciller and inker; Dave McCaig, colorist; and Carlos M. Mangual, letterer) has Clark Kent in the Daily Planet office with his boss Perry White and ducking out to save some innocents as Superman while also trying to meet his deadlines. This story was also previewed by DC online.
- "Actionland!" (Paul Dini, writer; José Luis García-López, penciller; Kevin Nowlan, inker; Trish Mulvihill, colorist; and Josh Reed, letterer) Mister Mxyzptlk and his lover Miss Gsptlsnz design a dangerous amusement park featuring Superman's exploits.
- "Faster Than a Speeding Bullet" (Brad Meltzer, writer; John Cassaday, penciller and inker; Laura Martin, colorist; and Chris Eliopolous, letterer) has Superman intercepting a bullet at the last second and talking to a woman who was brave in the face of danger.
- "The Truth" (Brian Michael Bendis, writer; Jim Lee, penciller; Scott Williams, inker; Alex Sinclair, colorist; and Cory Petit, letterer) has Supergirl and Superman face off against Rogol Zaar, a new villain who claims to be responsible for the destruction of Krypton.

== Publication and promotion ==
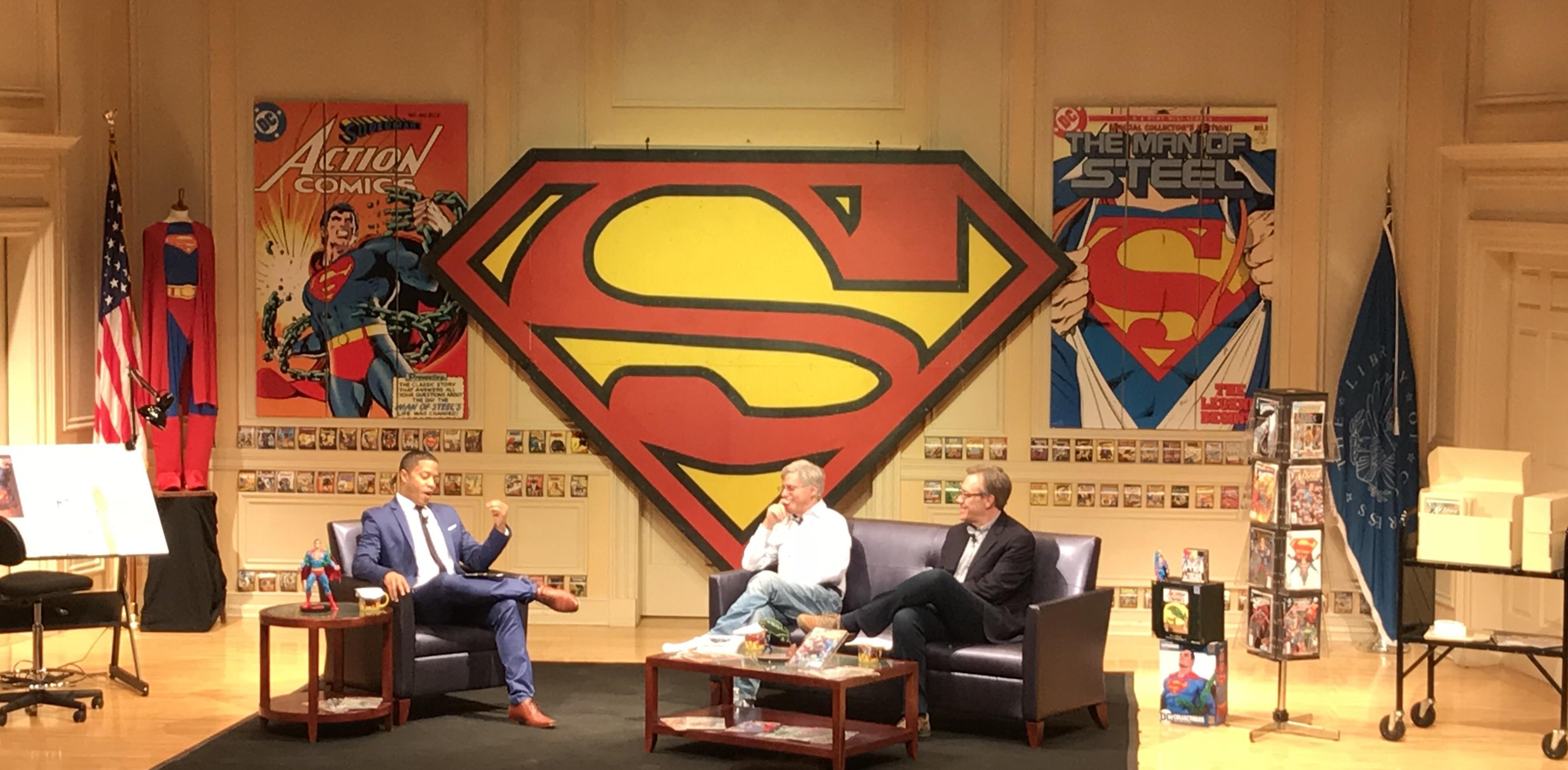
The Library of Congress hosting a discussion with Dan Jurgens and Paul Levitz for Superman's 80th anniversary and the issue

Action Comics #1000 involved several creative teams working independently for multiple stories. This anthology approach was common in comics' early history but is more rare today. The lead story ends a commercially and critically successful run by Jurgens, who has a long history working on Superman, including "The Death of Superman" storyline from 1992 and hands over the book to new regular writer Bendis who is also responsible for writing the miniseries Man of Steel (volume 2), following from his short story in this issue. García-López came out of retirement for this issue. DC initially solicited the title featuring several creators who did not appear in the final version, including Grant Morrison and Frank Quitely (who had previously partnered on All-Star Superman), long-time Superman artist Doug Mahnke, and Tim Sale.

The comic was paired with a hardcover retrospective released one week prior, Action Comics: 80 Years of Superman (ISBN 978-1401278878). This book features essays, reprints of previous stories and covers, the print debut of "The Game", and a newly published story made by Jerry Siegel and Joe Shuster that a young Marv Wolfman was given when he toured DC's headquarters as a child. The two publications' similar names and release dates caused confusion among consumers; this was compounded by the fact that the original title of the hardcover explicitly mentioned Action Comics #1000. Additionally, the book was originally solicited with a poster but that was removed prior to publication and made a separate item for purchase.

DC also had the issue tie in to an episode of The Big Bang Theory where the character of Sheldon Cooper attempts to buy the comic, but is interrupted by Neil Gaiman (playing himself). The issue sells out due to the author mentioning the store that he is in on social media, causing a flood of comic fans to visit.

== Reception ==
=== Critical reception ===
For The A.V. Club, Oliver Sava called the issue "an emotional, exciting celebration of Superman’s evolution and the core tenets that have stayed constant through these changes" giving it a B+. At Bleeding Cool, Joshua Davison gave the issue a 9.5 out of 10, saying, "In the litany of 'landmark' issues released of late—almost entirely of which came from Marvel and have been largely quite enjoyable—Action Comics #1000 manages to stand apart on a mixture of charm, endless sincerity, and an optimistic tone to brighten up even these dark times." He praised the issue for having several unique takes on Superman mythos. Eric Francisco of Inverse agreed that the comic was a superlative tribute to Superman, writing, "the comic itself will go down as one of the best Superman stories of all time. Very sentimental, maybe to a fault, Action #1000 is less about celebrating Superman, the Intellectual Property and more about examining why people believe in characters like Superman in the first place."

GameStop's Comicbook.com featured a review from Russ Burlingame, giving the issue four out of five, writing, "there is a lot to love in this volume". IGN's Jesse Schedeen gave the release an 8 out of 10, summing up, "there's a lot of heart in these pages, and no shortage of gorgeous artwork. It's impossible not to be moved by the many loving Superman tributes these creative teams have put together." In PopMatters' review by Jack Fisher, the issue got nine out of ten with the finale reading, "Like the Man of Steel himself, Action Comics #1000 does plenty to raise the bar and bring hope to generations past and present. What started Siegel and Shuster nearly a century ago is still going strong today. It seems impossible that any character could endure for so long, but that's exactly what makes him Superman."

Assessing the importance of the comic, Polygon writer Susana Paolo pointed out that the issue was only the second piece of writing that Brian Michael Bendis had ever done for DC Comics, after having spent the previous two decades being associated with his work on various Marvel Comics characters. Paolo summarized her review by saying, "If you’ve low-key detested every Superman story you’ve read or if you’ve given the character a good shake and still just don’t see his appeal, skip this one. But if, instead, you have an ounce of romance in your soul, pick it up." Similarly, Comic Book Resources caps the review from Jim Johnson by pointing out how, "[f]ans of Bendis have a lot to look forward to, but those enamored with the now-concluded Jurgens/Tomasi/Gleason era might take some time to win over" but praising the issue overall.

The importance of Bendis' transition to DC was noted by Newsarama's David Reposte: "Of course, the question on everyone's mind is likely what will be in the Man of Steel's future, as we get our first taste of Brian Michael Bendis at DC Comics. Teaming up with Jim Lee, Bendis certainly starts his tenure off with a bang... and while the cliffhanger of the story can't help but feel a little cheap, you can only hope that Bendis brings this tighter, more focused writing to his new company". He concludes the review, "[i]n a lot of ways, Action Comics #1000 feels like a bulletproof comic book, one whose strengths outweigh its flaws, and one whose structure seems impervious to diminished momentum" and gave the book eight out of 10.

The issue was notable not only for the quality of the stories and one of comics' most famous creators joining a new company, but also for Superman's costume reverting to its classic style with red trunks and yellow belt. As part of The New 52 line-wide relaunch, DC substantially changed the history and appearance of many of their heroes, including Superman. After the DC Rebirth relaunch merged elements of the old and new continuities, his appearance stayed mostly the same, but this issue reintroduced the classic look that the character has had basically for the entirety of his print history. NPR's Glen Weldon praised the move from an aesthetic perspective, saying that it "satisfies" and breaks up the blue and red color nicely. For io9, Rob Bricken summed up the controversy over the costume writing, "Superman is an icon, and so is his outfit", urging DC to revert to the classic costume years prior; the publication touted the return of the traditional suit in the run-up to the release. Prior to the issue's release, DC promoted the comic by handing out red trunks at SXSW.

According to Comicbook Roundup, Action Comics #1000 received an average rating of 8.9 out of 10 based on 48 reviews.

=== Commercial reception ===
Despite retailing for $7.99, this issue was the best-selling comic of April 2018. Its variant covers were also very popular: a few weeks before the issue's release in a breakdown from Diamond Comic Distributors of additional orders of comics which had 10 of Action Comics' covers in the top 15 of re-orders for that week. The standard cover was first, with the 1960s homage by Mike Allred being third, a blank white cover was fourth, a 2000s cover by Lee Bermejo was fifth, the 1930s cover by Steve Rude was sixth, the 1990s cover from Dan Jurgens was eighth, Jim Steranko's 1970s cover was ninth, the 1940s variant by Michael Cho was tenth, Joshua Middleton's 1980s cover was eleventh, and the 1950s variant by Dave Gibbons was twelfth. Two weeks before it was released, DC Comics' co-publisher Dan DiDio announced retailers had purchased more than half a million copies. The issue ended up being both the comic that sold the most issues as well as the one that made the most money in the North American market in April 2018, according to Diamond Comic Distributors; the final tally for April was 449,787 units. In contrast, The Amazing Spider-Man #800—another heavily promoted milestone issue released in the following month of May—sold 411,480 copies to retailers. Action Comics #1000 also charted in May, as the 23rd most-ordered comic with another 52,129 units sold.

== See also ==
- DC Multiverse, a toy line with an action figure based on Jim Lee's cover to this issue
