= Batman: Zero Year =

Comic book crossover featuring the superhero Batman (2013–2014)

"Zero Year"
- Publisher: DC Comics
- Publication date: June 2013 – July 2014
- Genre: Superhero
Title(s)
Batman #21-27, 29-33
Action Comics #25
Batgirl #25
Batman Annual #2
Batwing #25
Batwoman #25
Birds of Prey #25
Catwoman #25
Detective Comics #25
The Flash #25
Green Arrow #25
Green Lantern Corps #25
Nightwing #25
Red Hood and the Outlaws #25
- Main character(s): Batman; Alfred Pennyworth; Red Hood Gang; Riddler; Superman; Barbara Gordon; Luke Fox; Black Canary; Catwoman; Jim Gordon; Barry Allen; John Stewart; Dick Grayson; Jason Todd; Kate Kane

Creative team
- Writer(s): Scott Snyder; James Tynion IV
- Artist(s): Greg Capullo; Rafael Albuquerque
- Inker: Danny Miki
- Letterer(s): Nick J. Napolitano; Taylor Esposito; Dezi Sienty
- Colorist(s): Dave McCaig; FCO Plascencia
- Editor(s): Mike Marts; Katie Kubert

"Zero Year" was a yearlong comic book crossover event published by DC Comics that began in June 2013 and ended in July 2014, featuring the superhero Batman. The series was written by Scott Snyder with James Tynion IV (doing backup stories) and artwork by Greg Capullo, Danny Miki, and Rafael Albuquerque.

The story is intended to redefine the origin of Batman in The New 52, being a fresh story unconnected to other interpretations such as Batman: Year One. The story does, however, incorporate several elements from Batman: Year One, such as Bruce Wayne's long absence from Gotham City and his first attempts at vigilantism.

Initially conceptualized as a Batman storyline, it was announced that in November 2013, various titles would tie in directly to the "Zero Year" story line. Writers of various titles in The New 52 were given the option of writing a tie-in to the storyline, which would include their connections to Gotham City and first encounter with Batman.

Snyder announced in December 2013 that issue 28 would no longer be a part of the event, as he had written much material that felt "too cramped" and extending the issue at this point would not give Capullo ample time to properly draw the new scenes. Thus, the original story from issue 28 was moved to issue 29, with issue 28 becoming a preview issue to the future storyline in Batman and the weekly Batman Eternal. Issue 28 was written by Snyder and Tynion, with Dustin Nguyen and Derek Fridolfs providing the artwork. The entire crossover received critical acclaim.

== Synopsis ==
=== "Secret City" ===
The story begins with Gotham City being destroyed in a flood, and Batman believed to be dead. The first arc of the event, titled 'Secret City', is set five months before the flood, and begins with Bruce Wayne's return to Gotham City after being away for so long that he has been declared dead. He dons a disguise and fights Red Hood One, and discovers he has much to learn if he wants to fight the new breed of costumed criminals plaguing Gotham. Bruce meets with his maternal uncle, Philip Kane, but refuses to take over Wayne Enterprises. In a flashback, Bruce's father shows him a black orb, used for showing a three-dimensional map from inside a building. Edward Nygma, Philip's strategist, tries to get Philip to arrange Bruce's murder, in order to gain public sympathy and avoid a power struggle. After Philip refuses, Edward hires the Red Hood Gang to murder Bruce. In disguise once again, Bruce rescues Oswald Cobblepot from Red Hood One and takes a sample of the gang leader's blood, but fails to find who it belongs to. After Bruce has an argument with his butler Alfred Pennyworth, the latter leaves and Bruce meets with Philip, who against Bruce's will, debuts him to the public. After Bruce retreats from the media, he meets with Nygma. He then goes to his brownstone, where he is attacked by the Red Hood Gang. The gang beats Bruce to a pulp, and the leader tells him that the Waynes' deaths changed him too. Bruce then retreats to Wayne Manor, where Alfred treats his injuries. Using the camera orb, Bruce finds the cave of bats he fell into as a child. Bruce finds his destiny as the orb falls and breaks.

=== "Dark City" ===
The second arc was titled 'Dark City', and was about Bruce's first months as Batman. It begins with Bruce, as Batman, stopping another Red Hood robbery, and soon after learning Red Hood One's plan. Bruce reveals to the media that the Red Hood gang is planning to rob Ace Chemicals, so the gang tries to kill him. Bruce goes into Ace Chemicals as Batman, and begins fighting the gang. Philip, who was blackmailed into joining the gang, tries to shoot Red Hood One, but misses. Red Hood One shoots and kills Philip. Sergeant Jim Gordon raids Ace Chemicals with SWAT officers, intent on arresting both Batman and Red Hood One, but the building catches on fire. Red Hood One tries to escape on a helicopter, but Batman pulls him back into the building. Batman tries to capture Red Hood One, but the masked criminal escapes by jumping into a vat of chemicals. Bruce and Alfred study data on the gang when Edward Nygma, as the Riddler, shuts off the power in Gotham, challenging Batman to turn it back on. Soon, the police find a body with its bones twisted and grown out of its skin. Batman finds out a scientist working with Lucius Fox had created a program that had similar effects. Bruce goes to visit Fox, but Fox stabs Bruce with the toxin, stating that the program was also his, and that Doctor Death is coming. Bruce wakes to seeing Fox being attacked by Doctor Death. Bruce stops him with the help of Gordon and Fox informs him that the substance he injected him with earlier was an experimental antidote for Dr. Death's bone toxin. However, the fight with Doctor Death puts Bruce in the hospital. Bruce is confronted by Gordon at the hospital, but Bruce feels he cannot trust him. Bruce as Batman searches for Dr. Death's next victim, but is too late, as Doctor Death had already reached them. The police corner Batman and open fire, mistakenly believing that he is the murderer. Batman is badly wounded, but Gordon helps him escape. Gordon and Batman then begin a tenuous partnership. Batman then goes to Gotham's catacombs, a popular tourist attraction, to find Doctor Death and the Riddler, having deduced that the two criminals are working together. Doctor Death and the Riddler then flood the catacombs. Batman uses his Bat blimp to stop the Riddler's airship and bomb. Batman arrives at his airship and tries to use a jammer device to stop the bomb. As his blimp explodes, Batman jumps onto the airship, where Doctor Death is waiting to fight him. Gordon arrives at Wayne Tower only to find the Riddler there, and falls into one of his traps. Doctor Death and Batman fight briefly, but the villain drops the jammer off the airship. After subduing Doctor Death, Batman sets off a bomb that destroys the inside of the airship; Dr. Death is killed in the explosion. The police then turn the power back on, only to find out the Riddler still has the power to flood the city by blowing up the reservoir. Batman destroys the airship, but fails to stop the Riddler from flooding the city.

=== "Savage City" ===
The third and final arc was titled 'Savage City', and was about Bruce's efforts to save his city from the Riddler's control. It begins with Bruce Wayne awakening in the Duke residence, having removed the Batsuit before falling asleep. A young boy whose life he had saved informs him that the Riddler has taken control of Gotham. Alfred tells Batman to return to Wayne Manor through the secret entrance in the now dilapidated Crime Alley, the site of his parents' murder. Meanwhile, the military sends special forces soldiers to Gotham to help Gordon restore the peace. The Riddler uses a jumbotron every day to tell the people of Gotham that all he wants is a worthy opponent. The Riddler spots Gordon and the men on the rooftop, sending drones to stop him. The Riddler tries to destroy the building, but Batman stops him. Batman, Gordon, Fox and the soldiers plan a way to stop the Riddler. The next day, the Riddler appears on screen again to say that he will dedicate this "Zero Year" to the people of Gotham. Batman in a new costume comes driving in on a motorcycle and accepts the Riddler's challenge in order to buy time so Fox can discover their location. The Riddler drops Batman into a pit of lions. Batman fights and tames the lions, allowing Fox to find the Riddler's hiding place. Batman, Gordon and Fox try to attack the Riddler, only to fall into a trap. Fox is injured, but Batman saves him. The soldiers call in an airstrike to level Gotham while Batman finds the Riddler, as they play his last game. The Riddler challenges Batman to solve his riddles, allowing him one step closer to him on every answer he gets right. Gordon and Fox find a way to stop the jets from destroying Gotham. Batman grabs the Riddler, stopping his game. Gordon creates a Bat signal and successfully stops the jets. The Riddler reveals that to save Gotham, Batman must use his heart to turn the city's power back on; he must attach himself to an electrode. Batman successfully turns Gotham's power back on with the force of his own pulse. One month later, Gotham is back to normal, while the Riddler is put in Arkham Asylum. Bruce gets a visit from Julie Madison, an old flame, and Alfred tells him he has two choices: lead a normal life as Bruce Wayne, or protect Gotham as Batman. When Bruce chooses the latter, Alfred tells Julie that Bruce is "spoken for" as Batman disappears into the night.

== Titles ==
- Batman (2011) #21-27, 29-33

=== Tie-in issues ===
- Action Comics #25
- Batgirl #25
- Batman Annual #2
- Batwing #25
- Batwoman #25
- Birds of Prey #25
- Catwoman #25
- Detective Comics #25
- The Flash #25
- Green Arrow #25
- Green Lantern Corps #25
- Nightwing #25
- Red Hood and the Outlaws #25

== Collected editions ==
Title	Material collected	Published date	ISBN
Batman Volume 4 Zero Year - Secret City	Batman (2011) #21-24, Batman Annual #2	2014-05-07	1-4012-4508-0/978-1-4012-4508-5 (hardcover)
Batman Volume 4 Zero Year - Secret City	Batman (2011) #21-24, Batman Annual #2	2014-10-15	1-4012-4933-7/978-1-4012-4933-5 (softcover)
Batman Volume 5 Zero Year - Dark City	Batman (2011) #25-27, 29–33	2014-10-15	978-1-4012-4885-7 (hardcover)
Batman Volume 5 Zero Year - Dark City	Batman (2011) #25-27, 29–33	2015-04-29	1-4012-5335-0/978-1-4012-5335-6 (softcover)
Batman: Zero Year	Batman (2011) #21-27, 29–33	2021-08-31	978-1-77951-036-5
DC Comics: Zero Year	Batman (2011) #24-#25, Action Comics #25, Batgirl #25, Batwing #25, Batwoman #25, Birds of Prey #25, Catwoman #25, Detective Comics #25, The Flash #25, Green Arrow #25, Green Lantern Corps #25, Nightwing #25, Red Hood and the Outlaws #25	2014-10-29	1-4012-4937-X/978-1-4012-4937-3 (hardcover)
DC Comics: Zero Year	Batman (2011) #24-#25, Action Comics #25, Batgirl #25, Batwing #25, Batwoman #25, Birds of Prey #25, Catwoman #25, Detective Comics #25, The Flash #25, Green Arrow #25, Green Lantern Corps #25, Nightwing #25, Red Hood and the Outlaws #25	2015-04-01	1-4012-5337-7/978-1-4012-5337-0 (softcover)
Batman by Scott Snyder and Greg Capullo Omnibus Volume 1	Batman (2011) #1-33	2019-11-05	978-1-4012-9884-5

== Critical reception ==
The main crossover received critical acclaim with critics praising the art, the action, and the writing of Scott Snyder.

According to Comic Book Roundup, Batman Volume 2 Issue 21 received an average score of 8.5 out of 10 based on 41 reviews. Melissa Gray from IGN wrote "This younger, more innocent (if he could ever be called such a thing) Bruce Wayne tries to balance respecting his parents' legacy with his desire to do good outside the system. It's an honest portrait of a man between worlds trying to find himself. What he's about to find instead is that old family friends aren't what they appear, and any man whose first initial plus last name phonetically spell out "enigma" is definitely up to no good."

According to Comic Book Roundup, Batman Issue 22 received an average score of 8.7 out of 10 based on 35 reviews. Gilbert Rivera from Dark Knight News wrote "Batman #22 is more great work from two of DC's finest. Snyder is a machine, continuously building upon Batman's history without disturbing it, all the while adding pieces that feel like they've always belonged. Capullo, too, is unstoppable, as his work not only pushes Snyder's story telling to the next level, but also truly stands on its own. With the promise of issue #23 as "The End of Bruce Wayne" one can't help but wonder how much more surprises this pair has in store for us."

According to Comic Book Roundup, Batman Issue 23 received an average score of 8.6 out of 10 based on 32 reviews. Chuck wrote "I suspect it'll "read" better as a collection, because the story keeps stepping back and forth along Bruce's timeline, and it's not easy to keep track of things on a month-to-month basis. But the creative team is putting an interesting and original spin on a well-trod story - not an easy task. "

According to Comic Book Roundup, Batman Issue 24 received an average score of 9.3 out of 10 based on 31 reviews. Matt Dodge from Multiversity Comics wrote "Buy it, then buy another so you can frame the art. "Batman" #24 stands with #5 and #17 as the best of Scott Snyder and Greg Capullo's incredible run."

According to Comic Book Roundup, Batman Issue 25 received an average score of 8.7 out of 10 based on 35 reviews. Shawn Hoklas wrote "If you're not reading this title, you should be. It is simply one of the best titles being published today consistently."

According to Comic Book Roundup, Batman Issue 26 received an average score of 8.6 out of 10 based on 33 reviews. Josh Raj from Nerd on the Block wrote "Overall, Zero Year is a must read for any Batman fan. The art is stunning, the colors are great even if they are not dark like a normal Batman comic. There is just so much happening right night in Gotham, how will Batman walk away from this. The interactions with Gordon are great, mainly because we know where they end up. Batman #26 really does a fantastic job."

According to Comic Book Roundup, Batman Issue 27 received an average score of 8.8 out of 10 based on 32 reviews. Alison Berry from Comicosity wrote "This story will read as well in trade as it does in single issue, but single issue has the advantage of highlighting the character moments at which both Snyder and Capullo excel. Those moments are making the entire Zero Year arc stand out as a story that respects the Man as much as the Bat. Im the High Priestess of the Church of Pennyworth, thank you for listening. "

According to Comic Book Roundup, Batman Issue 29 received an average score of 9 out of 10 based on 36 reviews. Jeff Hill from Comic Booked wrote "My favorite scene was not the homage to The Dark Knight Returns (which is probably one of most people's favorites). It's not even the censored description of the Batman himself. And to be honest, even though I love both of those things and they are all sorts of Frank Miller, it came down to one scene for me that made this not only a great book, but a legendary one. It's the first time we see the Bat Blimp. Something so ridiculous in theory, so obnoxiously fictional in reality, that it shouldn't work. But Capullo's pencils make it work. And it's not only my favorite scene from the comic, but from Zero Year so far entirely. Well done, Mr. Capullo. You, sir, are a master. (Snyder's also excellent, but most of my reviews say that, so I'm going to let Greg have this one.) "

According to Comic Book Roundup, Batman Issue 30 received an average score of 8.5 out of 10 based on 26 reviews. Joey Garces from DC Comic News wrote "The pair of Snyder and Capullo continues to impress as the story telling and artwork are equally top notch. This storyline continues to separate itself from any of the other origin stories of Batman in the past, something that we can all appreciate. An epic finale has been set up and if it's anything like this issue then I recommend we get our pre-orders in now."

According to Comic Book Roundup, Batman Issue 31 received an average score of 8.8 out of 10 based on 28 reviews. Chuck wrote "Good to see this series getting back to its strengths!"

According to Comic Book Roundup, Batman Issue 32 received an average score of 8.8 out of 10 based on 24 reviews. Aaron Long from Comicosity wrote "Snyder and Capullo have become a team that will be remembered for decades to come and stories like Zero Year are why. Issue #32 is a fantastic single issue built upon a brilliant run of them, driving toward a conclusion that I can't wait to read. This is as good as comics get, and anyone who has been reading Batman to this point will be very satisfied with this issue. Zero Year is primed to have one hell of a finale, and I can't wait to get my hands on it."

According to Comic Book Roundup, Batman Issue 33 received an average score of 9.5 out of 10 based on 32 reviews. Wayne Hall from Major spoilers wrote "I cant wait until the next story starts in August! I think itll continue to keep Batman as the top-selling comic each month, so I highly recommend you dont miss it!"

== In other media ==
- Batman's suit from "Zero Year" appears as an unlockable suit in Batman: Arkham Origins Blackgate.
- Parts of the storyline were adapted for the fifth and final season of the television series Gotham.
- Matt Reeves' reboot film The Batman borrows elements from "Zero Year", namely utilizing the Riddler as the main antagonist, with a vendetta involving targeting Gotham's elite. The ending also involves Riddler enacting a bombing on Gotham's dam in order to flood the city.
