= American Vampire =

American comic book series

- Cover of American Vampire #1

Publication information
- Publisher: Vertigo (DC Comics)
- Schedule: Monthly
- Format: Ongoing series
- Genre: Gothic Western, Weird West
- Publication date: March 2010
- No. of issues: 34 (First Cycle); 11 (Second Cycle); 10 (1976); Also 13 issues in mini-series, one-shots, and anthologies
- Main character(s): Pearl Jones; Skinner Sweet

Creative team
- Created by: Scott Snyder; Rafael Albuquerque
- Written by: Scott Snyder; Stephen King (#1–5)
- Artist(s): Rafael Albuquerque; Mateus Santolouco
- Colorist: Dave McCaig

Collected editions
- Hardcover: ISBN 978-1-4012-2830-9

American Vampire is an American comic book series created by writer Scott Snyder and drawn by artist Rafael Albuquerque. It was published by DC Comics under its Vertigo imprint. American Vampire continued under the newly created DC Black Label imprint after Vertigo was closed in January 2020. The series imagines vampires as a population made up of many different secret species, and charts moments of vampire evolution and inter-species conflict throughout history. The focus of the series is a new American bloodline of vampires, born in the American West in the late 19th century.

The first of this new species is a notorious outlaw named Skinner Sweet, who wakes from death, after being infected, to find he has become a new kind of vampire, something stronger and faster than what came before, impervious to sunlight, with a new set of strengths and weaknesses. The series goes on to track his movements through various decades of American history—along with the movements of his first and only known progeny: Pearl Jones, a young woman working as a struggling actress in the 1920s silent film industry when she is attacked by a coven of European vampires hiding in Hollywood. Sweet saves her (uncharacteristically) by giving her his blood, thereby turning her into an American vampire like him, at which point she seeks revenge on the classic vampires who attacked her in life. The complicated and charged relationship between Jones and Sweet is another focus of the series.

The first five issues featured two stories—one by Scott Snyder and the other by Stephen King, both drawn by Rafael Albuquerque. With the sixth issue, Scott Snyder took over as sole writer. The original series ran from 2010 to 2013 and lasted 34 issues. A second series called American Vampire: Second Cycle ran from 2014 to 2015 and lasted 11 issues and the third and final series called American Vampire: 1976 ran from December 2020 – October 2021 and lasted 10 issues.

American Vampire spun off two mini-series. The first, "Survival of the Fittest", illustrated by Sean Murphy focuses on the cases files of the V.M.S., the vampire hunting organization of the series. The second, "Lord of Nightmares", illustrated by Dustin Nguyen further focuses on the mythology presented by "Survival of the Fittest". A one shot co-written by Snyder and Albuquerque (who also illustrates the 64-page issue), entitled "The Long Road to Hell", which features vampire hunter Travis Kidd, was released in June 2013. Two American Vampire anthologies have also been released, the first in 2013 and the second in 2016.

== Plot ==
The series explores notions of vampire evolution and traces the bloodline of a new kind of vampire, an American species, with new powers and characteristics, through various decades of American history.

The first five issues feature two story arcs. The first takes place in 1925 from the point of view of Pearl Jones, an aspiring actress in L.A., who becomes the second American Vampire and works to get her revenge on those who turned her. The second is of a writer at a book conference due to the re-editing of his book, Bad Blood, chronicling the story of outlaw-turned-vampire Skinner Sweet. Here, the author claims that his work – which has been long considered a fictional western/terror story – is actually based on true events which he has either witnessed or has collected reliable information on.

== Publication history ==
This series publication began on March 17, 2010, with the release of American Vampire #1. This is the first comic which features original Stephen King scripting who was contracted to the initial five issues.

=== Issues ===
==== First Cycle ====
Issue	Date	Arc	Story	Art	Color	Cover
#1	March 17, 2010	Big Break	Scott Snyder	Rafael Albuquerque	Dave McCaig	Rafael Albuquerque; Jim Lee (variant)
#1	March 17, 2010	Bad Blood	Stephen King	Rafael Albuquerque	Dave McCaig	Rafael Albuquerque; Jim Lee (variant)
#2	April 21, 2010	Morning Star	Scott Snyder	Rafael Albuquerque	Dave McCaig	Rafael Albuquerque; Bernie Wrightson & Dave McCaig (variant)
#2	April 21, 2010	Deep Water	Stephen King	Rafael Albuquerque	Dave McCaig	Rafael Albuquerque; Bernie Wrightson & Dave McCaig (variant)
#3	May 19, 2010	Rough Cut	Scott Snyder	Rafael Albuquerque	Dave McCaig	Rafael Albuquerque; Andy Kubert & Brad Anderson (variant)
#3	May 19, 2010	Blood Vengeance	Stephen King	Rafael Albuquerque	Dave McCaig	Rafael Albuquerque; Andy Kubert & Brad Anderson (variant)
#4	June 23, 2010	Double Exposure	Scott Snyder	Rafael Albuquerque	Dave McCaig	Rafael Albuquerque; J. H. Williams III (variant)
#4	June 23, 2010	One Drop of Blood	Stephen King	Rafael Albuquerque	Dave McCaig	Rafael Albuquerque; J. H. Williams III (variant)
#5	July 28, 2010	Curtain Call	Scott Snyder	Rafael Albuquerque	Dave McCaig	Rafael Albuquerque; Paul Pope (variant)
#5	July 28, 2010	If Thy Right Hand Offend Thee, Cut It Off	Stephen King	Rafael Albuquerque	Dave McCaig	Rafael Albuquerque; Paul Pope (variant)
#6	September 9, 2010	The Devil in the Sand	Scott Snyder	Rafael Albuquerque	Dave McCaig	Rafael Albuquerque; Rafael Grampá (variant)
#7	October 6, 2010	The Devil in the Sand	Scott Snyder	Rafael Albuquerque	Dave McCaig	Rafael Albuquerque
#8	November 10, 2010	The Devil in the Sand	Scott Snyder	Rafael Albuquerque	Dave McCaig	Rafael Albuquerque
#9	December 2, 2010	The Devil in the Sand	Scott Snyder	Rafael Albuquerque; Mateus Santolouco	Dave McCaig	Rafael Albuquerque
#10	December 22, 2010	The Way Out	Scott Snyder	Mateus Santolouco	Dave McCaig	Rafael Albuquerque
#11	January 26, 2011	The Way Out	Scott Snyder	Mateus Santolouco	Dave McCaig	Rafael Albuquerque
#12	February 23, 2011	Strange Frontier	Scott Snyder	Danijel Žeželj	Dave McCaig	Rafael Albuquerque
#13	March 30, 2011	Ghost War	Scott Snyder	Rafael Albuquerque	Dave McCaig	Rafael Albuquerque; Sean Gordon Murphy (variant)
#14	April 27, 2011	Ghost War	Scott Snyder	Rafael Albuquerque	Dave McCaig	Rafael Albuquerque
#15	May 25, 2011	Ghost War	Scott Snyder	Rafael Albuquerque	Dave McCaig	Rafael Albuquerque
#16	June 29, 2011	Ghost War	Scott Snyder	Rafael Albuquerque	Dave McCaig	Rafael Albuquerque
#17	July 27, 2011	Ghost War	Scott Snyder	Rafael Albuquerque	Dave McCaig	Rafael Albuquerque
#18	August 24, 2011	Ghost War	Scott Snyder	Rafael Albuquerque	Dave McCaig	Rafael Albuquerque
#19	September 28, 2011	The Beast in the Cave	Scott Snyder	Jordi Bernet	Dave McCaig	Rafael Albuquerque
#20	November 2, 2011	The Beast in the Cave	Scott Snyder	Jordi Bernet	Dave McCaig	Rafael Albuquerque
#21	December 14, 2011	The Beast in the Cave	Scott Snyder	Jordi Bernet	Dave McCaig	Rafael Albuquerque
#22	December 28, 2011	Death Race	Scott Snyder	Rafael Albuquerque	Dave McCaig	Rafael Albuquerque
#23	January 25, 2012	Death Race	Scott Snyder	Rafael Albuquerque	Dave McCaig	Rafael Albuquerque
#24	February 22, 2012	Death Race	Scott Snyder	Rafael Albuquerque	Dave McCaig	Rafael Albuquerque
#25	March 28, 2012	Death Race	Scott Snyder	Rafael Albuquerque	Dave McCaig	Rafael Albuquerque
#26	April 25, 2012	The Nocturnes	Scott Snyder	Roger Cruz	Dave McCaig	Rafael Albuquerque
#27	May 30, 2012	The Nocturnes	Scott Snyder	Riccardo Burchielli	Dave McCaig	Rafael Albuquerque
#28	June 27, 2012	The Blacklist	Scott Snyder	Rafael Albuquerque	Dave McCaig	Rafael Albuquerque; Greg Capullo & Fco Plascencia (variant)
#29	July 25, 2012	The Blacklist	Scott Snyder	Rafael Albuquerque	Dave McCaig	Rafael Albuquerque; Dave Johnson (variant)
#30	August 29, 2012	The Blacklist	Scott Snyder	Rafael Albuquerque	Dave McCaig	Rafael Albuquerque; Francesco Francavilla (variant)
#31	September 26, 2012	The Blacklist	Scott Snyder	Rafael Albuquerque	Dave McCaig	Rafael Albuquerque; Jock (variant)
#32	October 31, 2012	The Blacklist	Scott Snyder	Rafael Albuquerque	Dave McCaig	Rafael Albuquerque; Dustin Nguyen (variant)
#33	November 28, 2012	The Blacklist	Scott Snyder	Rafael Albuquerque	Dave McCaig	Rafael Albuquerque
#34	January 2, 2013	The Gray Trader	Scott Snyder	Rafael Albuquerque	Dave McCaig	Rafael Albuquerque

==== Second Cycle ====
Issue	Date	Arc	Story	Art	Color	Cover
#1	March 19, 2014	—	Scott Snyder	Rafael Albuquerque	Dave McCaig	Rafael Albuquerque; Jae Lee (variant)
#2	April 16, 2014	—	Scott Snyder	Rafael Albuquerque	Dave McCaig	Rafael Albuquerque
#3	May 21, 2014	—	Scott Snyder	Rafael Albuquerque	Dave McCaig	Rafael Albuquerque
#4	July 9, 2014	—	Scott Snyder	Rafael Albuquerque	Dave McCaig	Rafael Albuquerque
#5	October 1, 2014	The Miner's Journal	Matias Bergara	Rafael Albuquerque	Dave McCaig	Rafael Albuquerque
#6	February 4, 2015	Dark Moon	Scott Snyder	Rafael Albuquerque	Dave McCaig	Rafael Albuquerque
#7	April 15, 2015	Dark Moon	Scott Snyder	Rafael Albuquerque	Dave McCaig	Rafael Albuquerque
#8	July 1, 2015	Dark Moon	Scott Snyder	Rafael Albuquerque	Dave McCaig	Rafael Albuquerque
#9	August 5, 2015	Dark Moon	Scott Snyder	Rafael Albuquerque	Dave McCaig	Rafael Albuquerque
#10	September 30, 2015	Dark Moon	Scott Snyder	Rafael Albuquerque	Dave McCaig	Rafael Albuquerque
#11	November 25, 2015	Dark Moon	Scott Snyder	Rafael Albuquerque	Dave McCaig	Rafael Albuquerque

===== 1976 =====
Issue	Date	Arc	Story	Art	Color	Cover
#1	October 6, 2020	Don't Look Behind You!	Scott Snyder	Rafael Albuquerque	Dave McCaig	Rafael Albuquerque; Dustin Nguyen (variant)
#2	November 10, 2020	The Stuff of Legends	Scott Snyder	Rafael Albuquerque	Dave McCaig	Rafael Albuquerque; Francesco Francavilla (variant)
#3	December 8, 2020	Beneath the Greenhouse...	Scott Snyder	Rafael Albuquerque	Dave McCaig	Rafael Albuquerque; Mirka Andolfo (variant)
#4	January 12, 2021	Beneath the Greenhouse...	Scott Snyder	Rafael Albuquerque	Dave McCaig	Rafael Albuquerque; Mirka Andolfo (variant)
#5	February 9, 2021	The Big Lie	Scott Snyder	Rafael Albuquerque	Dave McCaig	Rafael Albuquerque; Tula Lotay (variant)
#6	March 9, 2021	Fire and Flame	Scott Snyder	Rafael Albuquerque	Dave McCaig	Rafael Albuquerque; Jorge Fornés (variant)
#7	April 13, 2021	Interlude "Family Trees"	Scott Snyder	Tula Lotay (Root); Francesco Francavilla (Trunk); Ricardo López Ortiz (Limb)	Tula Lotay (Root); Francesco Francavilla (Trunk); Dave McCaig (Limb)	Rafael Albuquerque; Dani (variant)
#8	May 11, 2021	Death Mask	Scott Snyder	Rafael Albuquerque	Dave McCaig	Rafael Albuquerque
#9	June 8, 2021	Farewell	Scott Snyder	Rafael Albuquerque	Dave McCaig	Rafael Albuquerque; Jorge Fornés (variant)
#10	August 3, 2021	Farewell	Scott Snyder	Rafael Albuquerque	Dave McCaig	Rafael Albuquerque; Mateus Santolouco (variant)

==== Others ====
Title	Issue	Date	Story		Art	Color	Cover
American Vampire: Survival of the Fittest	#1	June 8, 2011	Scott Snyder		Sean Murphy	Dave Stewart	Sean Murphy & Dave Stewart; Cliff Wu Chiang (variant)
American Vampire: Survival of the Fittest	#2	July 13, 2011	Scott Snyder		Sean Murphy	Dave Stewart	Sean Murphy & Dave Stewart
American Vampire: Survival of the Fittest	#3	August 10, 2011	Scott Snyder		Sean Murphy	Dave Stewart	Sean Murphy & Dave Stewart
American Vampire: Survival of the Fittest	#4	September 14, 2011	Scott Snyder		Sean Murphy	Dave Stewart	Sean Murphy & Dave Stewart
American Vampire: Survival of the Fittest	#5	October 12, 2011	Scott Snyder		Sean Murphy	Dave Stewart	Sean Murphy & Dave Stewart
American Vampire: Lord of Nightmares	#1	June 13, 2012	Scott Snyder		Dustin Nguyen	John Kalisz	Dustin Nguyen
American Vampire: Lord of Nightmares	#2	July 11, 2012	Scott Snyder		Dustin Nguyen	John Kalisz	Dustin Nguyen
American Vampire: Lord of Nightmares	#3	August 8, 2012	Scott Snyder		Dustin Nguyen	John Kalisz	Dustin Nguyen
American Vampire: Lord of Nightmares	#4	September 12, 2012	Scott Snyder		Dustin Nguyen	John Kalisz	Dustin Nguyen
American Vampire: Lord of Nightmares	#5	October 17, 2012	Scott Snyder		Dustin Nguyen	John Kalisz	Dustin Nguyen
American Vampire: The Long Road to Hell	#1	June 12, 2013	Scott Snyder; Rafael Albuquerque		Rafael Albuquerque	Dave McCaig	Rafael Albuquerque; Tony Moore (variant)
American Vampire Anthology	#1	August 28, 2013	The Man Comes Around, Part 1	Scott Snyder	Rafael Albuquerque	Dave McCaig	Rafael Albuquerque
American Vampire Anthology	#1	August 28, 2013	Lost Colony	Jason Aaron	Declan Shalvey	Jordie Bellaire	Rafael Albuquerque
American Vampire Anthology	#1	August 28, 2013	Bleeding Kansas	Rafael Albuquerque	Ivo Milazzo		Rafael Albuquerque
American Vampire Anthology	#1	August 28, 2013	Canadian Vampire	Jeff Lemire	Ray Fawkes		Rafael Albuquerque
American Vampire Anthology	#1	August 28, 2013	Greed	Becky Cloonan		Jordie Bellaire	Rafael Albuquerque
American Vampire Anthology	#1	August 28, 2013	The Producers	Francesco Francavilla			Rafael Albuquerque
American Vampire Anthology	#1	August 28, 2013	Essence of Life	Gail Simone	Tula Lotay		Rafael Albuquerque
American Vampire Anthology	#1	August 28, 2013	Last Night	Fábio Moon; Gabriel Bá		Dave McCaig	Rafael Albuquerque
American Vampire Anthology	#1	August 28, 2013	Portland, 1940	Greg Rucka	J.P. Leon	Dave McCaig	Rafael Albuquerque
American Vampire Anthology	#1	August 28, 2013	The Man Comes Around, Part 2	Scott Snyder	Rafael Albuquerque	Dave McCaig	Rafael Albuquerque
American Vampire Anthology	#2	September 7, 2016	Opening Shot	Scott Snyder	Rafael Albuquerque	Dave McCaig	Rafael Albuquerque
American Vampire Anthology	#2	September 7, 2016	Teahouse	Joëlle Jones	Cristopher Mitten	Quinton Winter	Rafael Albuquerque
American Vampire Anthology	#2	September 7, 2016	Bride	Marguerite Bennett	Mirka Andolfo	Arif Prianto	Rafael Albuquerque
American Vampire Anthology	#2	September 7, 2016	The Bleeding Nun	Clay McLeon Chapman	Richard Isanove		Rafael Albuquerque
American Vampire Anthology	#2	September 7, 2016	The Cut	Steve Orlando	Artyom Trakhanov	Veronica Gandini	Rafael Albuquerque
American Vampire Anthology	#2	September 7, 2016	Traveling Companion	Elliot Kalan	Andrea Mutti	Giulia Brusco	Rafael Albuquerque
American Vampire Anthology	#2	September 7, 2016	When The Cold Wind Blows	Shawn Aldridge	Szymon Kudranski		Rafael Albuquerque
American Vampire Anthology	#2	September 7, 2016	England's Dreaming	Kieron Gillen	Leila del Duca	Patricia Mulvihill	Rafael Albuquerque
American Vampire Anthology	#2	September 7, 2016	Devil's Own Luck	Rafael Albuquerque	Renato Guedes		Rafael Albuquerque
American Vampire Anthology	#2	September 7, 2016	Brother's Keeper	Scott Snyder	Afua Richardson	Antonio Fabela	Rafael Albuquerque

=== Collected editions ===
Volume	Collects	Pages	Format	Published	ISBN
1	American Vampire #1–5	200	HC	September 29, 2010	978-1401228309
1	American Vampire #1–5	200	TPB	October 5, 2011	978-1401229740
2	American Vampire #6–11	160	HC	May 25, 2011	978-1401230692
2	American Vampire #6–11	160	TPB	May 2, 2012	978-1401230708
3	American Vampire #12–18; American Vampire: Survival of the Fittest #1–5	288	HC	February 1, 2012	978-1781160251
3	American Vampire #12–18; American Vampire: Survival of the Fittest #1–5	288	TPB	September 26, 2012	978-1401233341
4	American Vampire #19–27	208	HC	September 26, 2012	978-1401237189
4	American Vampire #19–27	208	TPB	September 4, 2013	978-1401237196
5	American Vampire: Lord of Nightmares #1–5; American Vampire #28–34	280	HC	March 27, 2013	978-1401237707
5	American Vampire: Lord of Nightmares #1–5; American Vampire #28–34	280	TPB	March 26, 2014	978-1401237714
6	American Vampire: Long Road to Hell #1; American Vampire Anthology #1	144	HC	March 26, 2014	978-1401247089
6	American Vampire: Long Road to Hell #1; American Vampire Anthology #1	144	TPB	November 26, 2014	978-1401249298
7	American Vampire – Second Cycle #1–5	144	HC	January 14, 2015	978-1401248826
7	American Vampire – Second Cycle #1–5	144	TPB	November 11, 2015	978-1401254322
8	American Vampire – Second Cycle #6–11	144	HC	February 17, 2016	978-1401254339
8	American Vampire – Second Cycle #6–11	144	TPB	July 20, 2016	978-1401262587
9	American Vampire: 1976 #1–10	256	HC	November 2, 2021	978-1779512673
9	American Vampire: 1976 #1–10	256	TPB	October 25, 2022	978-1779517241

=== Omnibus editions ===
Volume	Collects	Pages	Published	ISBN
1	American Vampire #1–27; American Vampire: Survival of the Fittest #1–5; American Vampire: Lord of Nightmares #1–5	984	October 31, 2018	978-1401284831
2	American Vampire #28–34; American Vampire: The Long Road to Hell #1; American Vampire: Anthology #1–2; American Vampire: Second Cycle #1–11; American Vampire: 1976 #1–10	928	October 11, 2022	978-1779516886

=== DC Compact Comics ===
Volume	Collects	Pages	Published	ISBN
1	American Vampire #1–11	320	October 1, 2024	978-1779527349

=== 2024 TPB Collections ===
Book	Collects	Pages	Published	ISBN
1	American Vampire #1–12	352	October 1, 2024	ISBN 978-1779527547
2	American Vampire #13–25; American Vampire: Survival of the Fittest #1–5	408	October 14, 2025	ISBN 978-1799502913

== Characters ==
- Skinner Sweet – an outlaw who lived in the Wild West, he was turned into a vampire when the blood from Percy, a vampire banker, fell into his eye during a fight while he was escaping from being hanged. After being trapped into a coffin sunken sixty-six feet under water, he escaped and hunted the vampires who tried to kill him. In 1936, Sweet has relocated to Las Vegas, where he opened a brothel, using the name Jim Smoke. Later Skinner finds himself swept up into WWII as he hunts down a threat with Pearl.
- Pearl Jones – an aspiring actress in the 1920s who was ambushed by a group of vampires led by a vampire director named B.D. Bloch during one of his parties. She was left for dead at a pit in the desert, but was saved by Sweet when he dropped his blood on her eye, turning her into a vampire. She has relocated to Arrowhead, California, using the surname of her husband, Henry Preston, while she is hiding from the other vampires.
- Hattie Hargrove – Hattie is Pearl's ambitious and slightly put upon roommate in Hollywood, sharing an apartment with the main character before Pearl is murdered by vampires and transformed by Skinner Sweet.
- Henry Preston – Pearl Jones' husband, a World War 1 veteran who works as a jazz musician who decided to help Pearl to enact her revenge against the vampires who almost killed her. Prior to arriving in Hollywood and working as a resident guitarist at a speak easy where Pearl worked, Henry was a journeymen Guitar player. He isn't intimidated by Pearl's vampirism, but sometimes he feels some sadness by the fact that while he's getting older, Pearl isn't. Henry later dies stopping Hattie.
- Mr. B.D. Bloch – a European vampire masquerading as a Hollywood Mogul.
- James "Jim" Book – a detective who worked for Pinkerton Agency, he hunted and arrested Skinner Sweet, who turned him into a vampire in retaliation. Before being consumed by his vampiric instincts, he extracts a promise from Abilena, she is to kill him in exchange for fathering her child that same night.
- Abilena Camillo/Book – daughter of Felix Camillo, her mother died at birth. She is James Book's god-daughter, though she professes an unrequited love for him once she grows up. After his death, she takes his surname and together with her daughter Felicia Book hunts Skinner Sweet for an organization called The Vassals of the Morning Star.
- Felix Camillo – father of Abilena Camillo/Book Deputy to James Book, and Grandfather of Felicia.
- Will Bunting – the writer of "Bad Blood" and witness to the birth of Skinner Sweet as the first documented American Vampire.
- Percy – leader of a cabal of vampires taking advantage of western expansion, and the maker of Skinner Sweet.
- Finch – human servant of Percy and the Vampire cabal and employer of James Book.
- Mimiteh – a young Shoshone woman who was the first actual American vampire though her exploits were lost to history.
- Felicia Book – fathered by James Book and his god-daughter Abilena on the night he dies. She is a member of The Vassals of the Morning Star, an organization which hunts vampires. She seems to have unique abilities due to her father's vampirism, though the extent of her abilities is yet to be seen.
- Jack Straw – another member of the Vassals of the Morning Star, Straw was partnered with Felicia Book while investigating vampire activity in Las Vegas.
- Cashel "Cash" McCogan – as Chief of the Las Vegas Police Department, Cash became involved with Jack Straw and Felicia Book while investigating the grisly murders of several persons responsible for the construction of the Hoover Dam (then called the Boulder Dam).
- Calvin Poole – a soldier in World War 2 who served with Henry Preston during the "Ghost War" story arc. He was accidentally turned into a vampire after a bottle of Pearl's Blood broke and infected him.
