= Scott Snyder =

American writer

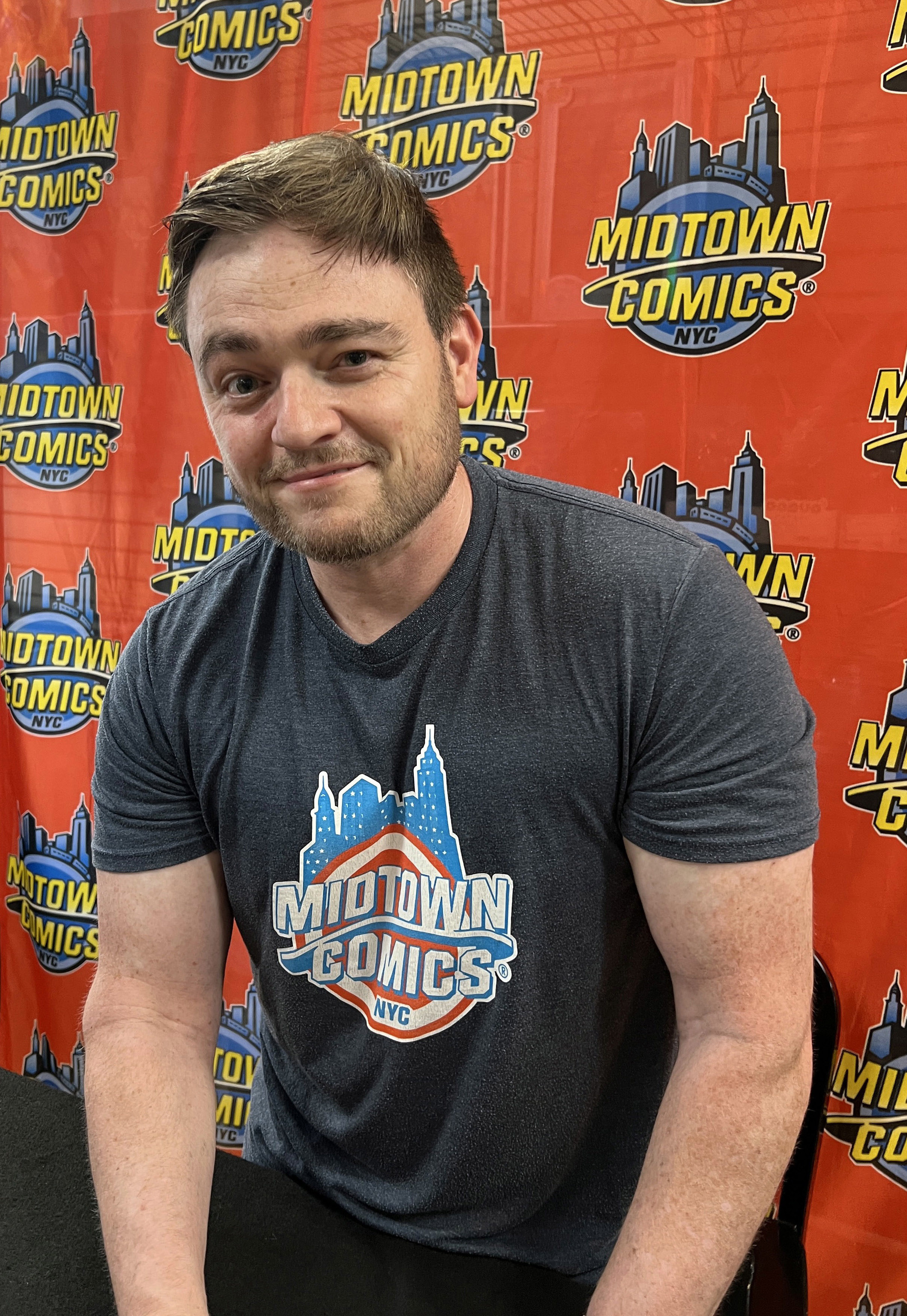
- Snyder at a 2024 Midtown Comics signing for White Boat
- Born: 15 January 1976 (age 50); New York City, U.S.
- Occupation: Writer
- Writing career
- Notable works: Batman; Detective Comics; American Vampire; Wytches; Swamp Thing; Justice League; Dark Nights: Metal; Dark Nights: Death Metal; Absolute Batman

Scott Snyder (born January 15, 1976) is a highly acclaimed American comic book writer. He is known for his 2006 short story collection Voodoo Heart, and his work for DC Comics, including series such as American Vampire, Detective Comics, a highly acclaimed run on Batman, Swamp Thing, Justice League, and Absolute Batman as well as the company-wide crossover storylines "Dark Nights: Metal" and "Dark Nights: Death Metal." He has also written creator-owned comics published through Image Comics, including Wytches, Undiscovered Country, and Nocterra.

As part of his DC work, he co-created the characters, The Batman Who Laughs, Mr. Bloom, and the Court of Owls.

Snyder has garnered acclaim from critics and fans for his work, such as his run on The New 52 version of Batman that debuted in 2011, and has won numerous industry awards, including three Eisner Awards, a Harvey Award, and a 2012 Eagle Award for Best Writer.

== Early life ==
Scott Snyder was born January 15, 1976. At the age of nine, he attended a summer camp where one of the counselors read Stephen King's The Eyes of the Dragon to him over the summer, an experience that Snyder says "really jump-started my love of story-telling." He was also influenced by the writing of Denis Johnson, Raymond Carver, Rick Bass, Joy Williams, Elizabeth McKracken, Stephen King, Tobias Wolff, and George Saunders. In comics, he has named Alan Moore and Frank Miller as his favorite writers.

Snyder graduated from Brown University in 1998 with a degree in creative writing, and then worked at Walt Disney World for about a year. He initially worked as a custodian, but after he injured his shoulder and started to have some problems with his co-workers, he auditioned and worked as some of the characters. Snyder's Disney World stint strongly influenced his writing; he later recalled, "it did a world of good for my writing ... All the things I ended up writing about, those things that are deeply frightening to me—fear of commitment and growing up, fear of losing loved ones, the wonder and terror of falling in love—all of it was constantly being played out all around me in this weird, cartoonish, magnified way at Disney."

Snyder then enrolled at Columbia University where he received an MFA in fiction.

== Career ==
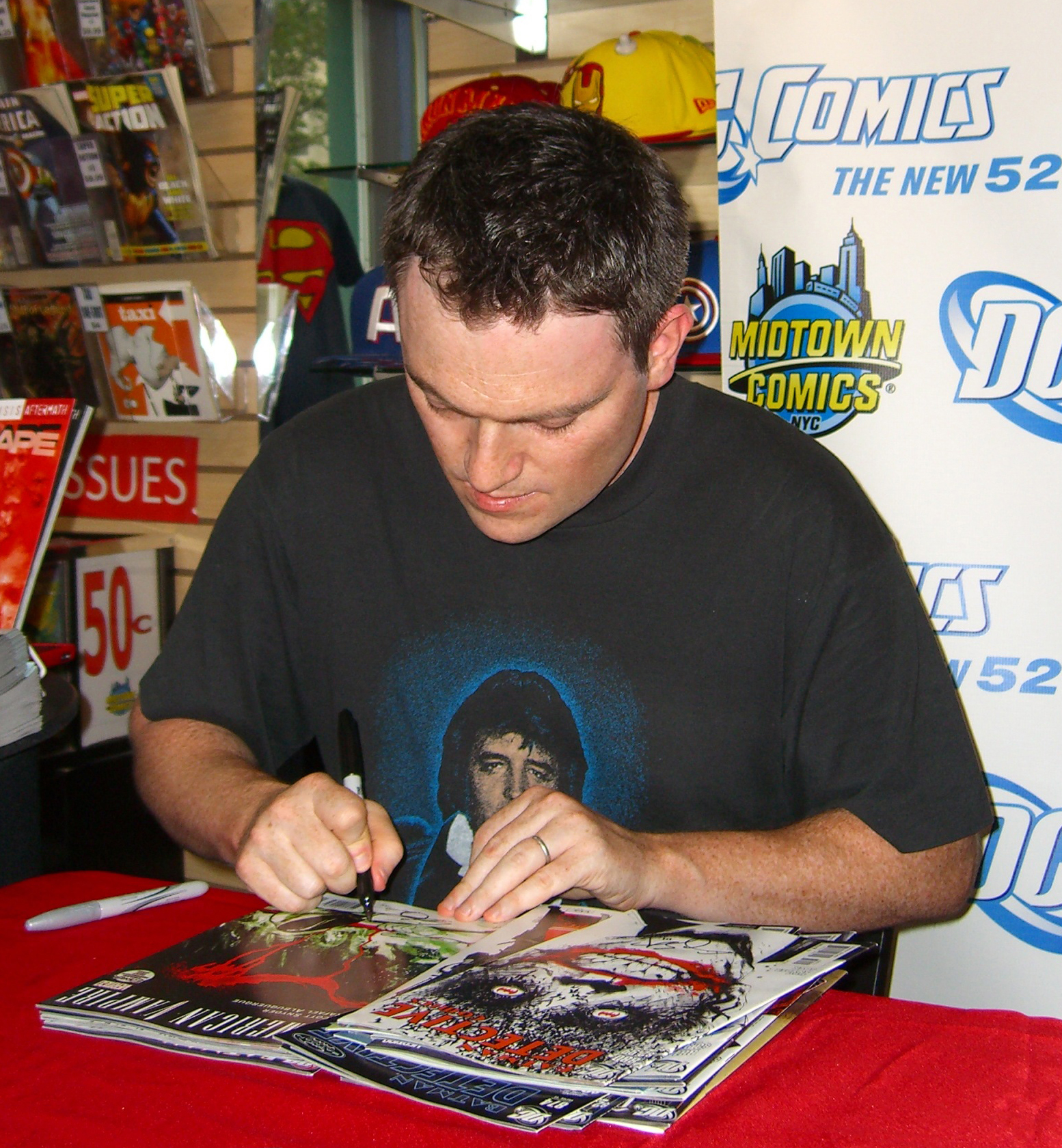
Snyder signing copies of American Vampire and Detective Comics at a September 21, 2011 store appearance

=== 2000s ===
Snyder's first collection of stories, Voodoo Heart, was published by the Dial Press in June 2006. The collection received starred reviews from Publishers Weekly and Booklist, and was a Kirkus Reviews "Hot Debut" of the year. The New York Times published a positive review by author Andrew Sean Greer in the Sunday Book Review.

Stephen King picked two of the included stories—"Wreck" and "Dumpster Tuesday"—for the 2007 The Best American Short Stories anthology shortlist. Voodoo Heart was shortlisted for The Story Prize in 2006.

In 2008, Snyder wrote a short story called The Thirteenth Egg for the anthology Who Can Save Us Now? Brand-New Superheroes and Their Amazing (Short) Stories.

In 2009, Snyder began writing for Marvel Comics. His first foray into the superhero genre was a one-shot focusing on the first Human Torch, part of Marvel's 70th anniversary celebrations. He later wrote the four-issue miniseries, Iron Man: Noir, which debuted in April 2010.

By the late 2000s, Snyder had taught writing at New York University, Columbia University, and Sarah Lawrence College.

=== 2010s ===
Vertigo began publishing American Vampire, Snyder's first creator-owned ongoing series, in March 2010. The first five issues feature an original storyline by Stephen King. American Vampire won the 2011 Eisner Award for Best New Series, as well as the 2011 Harvey Award for Best New Series.

Snyder's run as writer of Detective Comics began with issue No. 871 (Jan. 2011) of that title, which marked the beginning of his exclusive contract with DC Comics. He and Kyle Higgins wrote the Batman: Gates of Gotham miniseries which debuted in May 2011.

Beginning in September 2011, Snyder became the writer of both Batman and a new Swamp Thing ongoing series as part of The New 52, DC Comics' company-wide relaunch of all of its titles. Snyder's Batman series reinivisioned the classic character for the New 52's rebooted continuity, garnering acclaim from critics and fans. Snyder later became the co-writer of Talon, a spin-off of the "Court of Owls" storyline in Batman, which focused on a rogue Talon from the Court.

It was announced at the 2012 New York Comic Con that Snyder would be writing a new Superman ongoing series, titled Superman Unchained, with art by Jim Lee. The series began publication in June 2013.

Snyder left the Swamp Thing series as of issue #18 (May 2013) and began writing The Wake, a 10-issue, ocean-based horror miniseries drawn by Snyder's American Vampire: Survival Of The Fittest collaborator Sean Murphy. The series follows marine biologist Lee Archer, who along with the Department of Homeland Security, discovers a potential threat to humanity that may involve strange, humanoid creatures that inhabit the ocean depths. The story shifts between three time periods: the near future, two centuries in the future and the distant past. The covers of the first five issues form a mural when placed side by side.

The same month, DC published a Free Comic Book Day sneak preview of Superman Unchained, an ongoing series written by Snyder and illustrated by Jim Lee, which was later published on June 12, 2013, and intended to coincide with the feature film Man of Steel, which opened two days later. Snyder explained his approach to the series: "The way to approach a character as iconic as him is you just come at it from a standpoint of what you love the most about the character, and then write a story that explores that, tear it down and build it back up."

Snyder was one of the co-writers of the Batman Eternal series which launched in April 2014. The second run of Batman Eternal, retitled as Batman & Robin Eternal launched on October 7, 2015. During this time, Snyder and Detective Comics collaborate Jock launched the Image Comics series Wytches, the media rights to which were purchased by Brad Pitt's Plan B Entertainment in October 2014. In 2016, Snyder and artist John Romita Jr. collaborated on the All-Star Batman series as part of the DC Rebirth relaunch.

Snyder and Greg Capullo launched the Dark Nights: Metal limited series in August 2017. Snyder and artist Andy Kubert created the New Challengers, part of The New Age of DC Heroes line. Snyder and Rafael Albuquerque crafted "The Fifth Season" chapter in Action Comics #1000 (June 2018).

Snyder co-wrote Justice League: No Justice with Joshua Williamson and James Tynion IV, with art by Francis Manapul. Following that, Snyder re-launched the main Justice League series with art from Jim Cheung and Jorge Jimenez, while Williamson and Tynion wrote the companion series Justice League Odyssey and Justice League Dark, respectively.

In 2018, Snyder, along with co-writer Tony Patrick and artist Cully Hamner, launched the mini-series Batman and the Signal, featuring Duke Thomas as Gotham's daylight protector, The Signal. A spin-off limited series from Dark Nights: Metal, The Batman Who Laughs, was launched by him and Jock in 2019. In 2020, he and Greg Capullo released the DC Black Label miniseries Batman: Last Knight on Earth, described as "the grand finale" of their New 52 run. That same year, the two launched the follow-up to Dark Nights: Metal—Dark Nights: Death Metal.

=== 2020s ===
Snyder's Image series Nocterra, drawn by Detective Comics artist Tony S. Daniel, was launched in March 2021 following a Kickstarter campaign for the first issue. A television adaptation is currently in development at Netflix.

In July 2021, Snyder announced an eight-title digital first deal with comiXology Originals, all to be published through his creator-owned imprint Best Jackett Press, with the books set to receive print versions via Dark Horse Comics. The first three, We Have Demons with Greg Capullo, Clear with Francis Manapul, and Night of the Ghoul with Francesco Francavilla, debuted in October 2021. In October 2022, Deadline reported that a film adaptation of Night of the Ghoul was in development at 20th Century Studios.

Snyder was among a group of creators with whom fellow comics writer Nick Spencer formed a deal in August 2021 with the subscription-based newsletter platform Substack to publish creator-owned comics stories, essays, and instructional guides on that platform. Snyder indicated that he would offer a virtual writing class to aspiring writers through his published posts and instructional live videos.

An animated television series adaptation of Wytches was announced by Amazon Prime Video in February 2023, with Snyder serving as co-showrunner.

DC revealed in July 2024 that Snyder would return to the company to spearhead DC All In, an initiative that would introduce the Absolute Universe characters and titles, including Absolute Superman written by Jason Aaron and drawn by Rafa Sandoval, Absolute Wonder Woman written by Kelly Thompson and drawn by Hayden Sherman, and Absolute Batman written by Snyder and drawn by Nick Dragotta. Snyder was also announced as the co-writer, alongside Joshua Williamson, of DC All In Special #1, an oversized one-shot flipbook with art by Daniel Sampere and Wes Craig that will kick off the initiative. In September 2025, Snyder and Dragotta's Absolute Batman title reached #5 on the New York Times Best Seller list In June 2026, The Hollywood Reporter reported that an animated TV adaptation of Absolute Batman was in development at DC Studios and Warner Bros. Animation with Snyder serving as executive producer/showrunner and Dragotta serving as producer.

It was announced in January 2025 that Dark Spaces: Dungeon, a 5 issue horror miniseries, written by Snyder and drawn by Hayden Sherman, which was published in 2023–2024, would be getting a film adaptation from Spooky Pictures, producers of Barbarian and Late Night with the Devil.

It was announced in July 2025 that Snyder would co-plot an event series, DC K.O., drawn by Javier Fernandez, which would follow up on the event of DC All In. The title was published starting that October and concluded in March 2026, leading into the Next Level initiative.

In October 2025, it was announced that Snyder would be co-writing a six-issue miniseries, entitled Absolute Catwoman, with Che Grayson and art by Bengal. The series will focus on the Absolute Universe's version of Selina Kyle / Catwoman as embarks on a globe-trotting adventure. The first issue released on June 10, 2026.

== Personal life ==
Snyder has a wife named Jeanie and two sons. On March 3, 2019, Snyder announced that they were expecting another child in May. Their child, a son, was born on May 4, 2019.

Snyder and his family live on Long Island.

== Awards ==
- 2011 Eisner Award for Best New Series (with Stephen King and Rafael Albuquerque for American Vampire)
- 2011 Harvey Award for Best New Series (with Stephen King and Rafael Albuquerque for American Vampire)
- 2012 Eagle Award for Best Writer
- 2012 Stan Lee Award for Best Ongoing Series (Detective Comics)
- 2012 Stan Lee Award for Best Writer
- 2012 Stan Lee Award for Man of the Year
- 2014 Eisner Award for Best Limited Series (with Sean Murphy for The Wake)
- 2019 Inkpot Award
- 2023 Eisner Award for Best Digital Comic (with Tula Lotay for Barnstormers)
- 2026 Eisner Award for Best Continuing Series (with Nick Dragotta for Absolute Batman)
- 2026 Ringo Award for Best Series (Absolute Batman)

=== Nominations ===
- 2011 Eagle Award for Favourite Newcomer Writer
- 2011 Eagle Award for Favourite New Comic Book (with Stephen King and Rafael Albuquerque for American Vampire)
- 2011 Harvey Award for Most Promising New Talent
- 2012 Goodreads Choice Awards for Best Graphic Novels & Comics (for Batman Vol. 1: The Court of Owls)
- 2013 Harvey Award for Best Writer (for Batman)
- 2014 Eisner Award for Best Writer (for Batman (DC); American Vampire, The Wake)
- 2023 Ringo Award for Best Writer
- 2023 Harvey Award for Digital Book of the Year (with Tula Lotay for Barnstormers)
- 2026 Eisner Award for Best Writer (for Absolute Batman, Batman/Deadpool (DC); By a Thread: Book 2 (Comixology Originals), You Won’t Feel a Thing (DSTLRY)
- 2026 Eisner Award for Best Continuing Series (with Nick Dragotta for Absolute Batman)
- 2026 Harvey Award for Book of the Year (with Nick Dragotta for Absolute Batman Vol. 1: The Zoo)
- 2026 Ringo Award for Best Series (with Nick Dragotta and Frank Martin for Absolute Batman)

== Bibliography ==
=== Early work ===
- Voodoo Heart (collection of short prose stories, 288 pages, The Dial Press, 2006, ISBN 0-385-33841-4)
- Who Can Save Us Now?: "The Thirteenth Egg" (short prose story illustrated by Gary Panter; 432 pages, Free Press, 2008, ISBN 1-4165-6644-9)
- Marvel:
  - Human Torch Comics 70th Anniversary Special (with Scott Wegener, one-shot, 2009) collected in Timely 70th Anniversary Collection (hc, 280 pages, 2010, ISBN 0-7851-3899-4)
  - Nation X #1: "Testament" (with David López, anthology, 2010) collected in X-Men: Nation X (hc, 360 pages, 2010, ISBN 0-7851-3873-0; tpb, 2010, ISBN 0-7851-4103-0)
  - Iron Man Noir #1–4 (with Manuel García, 2010) collected as Iron Man Noir (hc, 112 pages, 2010, ISBN 0-7851-4727-6; tpb, 2011, ISBN 0-7851-4728-4)

=== DC Comics ===
- American Vampire:
  - American Vampire (with Rafael Albuquerque, Mateus Santolouco (#9–11), Danijel Žeželj (#12), Jordi Bernet (#19–21), Roger Cruz (#26) and Riccardo Burchielli (#27), Vertigo, 2010–2013) collected as:
    - Volume 1 (collects #1–5, hc, 200 pages, 2010, ISBN 1-4012-2830-5; tpb, 2011, ISBN 1-4012-2974-3)
    - Volume 2 (collects #6–11, hc, 160 pages, 2011, ISBN 1-4012-3069-5; tpb, 2012, ISBN 1-4012-3070-9)
    - Volume 3 (collects #12–18, hc, 288 pages, 2012, ISBN 1-4012-3333-3; tpb, 2012, ISBN 1-4012-3334-1)
      - Includes the 5-issue spin-off limited series American Vampire: Survival of the Fittest (written by Snyder, art by Sean Gordon Murphy, 2011)
    - Volume 4 (collects #19–27, hc, 208 pages, 2012, ISBN 1-4012-3718-5; tpb, 2013, ISBN 1-4012-3719-3)
    - Volume 5 (collects #28–34, hc, 280 pages, 2013, ISBN 1-4012-3770-3; tpb, 2014, ISBN 1-4012-3771-1)
      - Includes the 5-issue spin-off limited series American Vampire: The Lord of Nightmares (written by Snyder, art by Dustin Nguyen, 2012)
    - Omnibus Volume 1 (collects #1–27, Survival of the Fittest #1–5 and The Lord of Nightmares #1–5, hc, 984 pages, 2018, ISBN 1-4012-8483-3)
  - American Vampire Volume 6 (hc, 144 pages, 2014, ISBN 1-4012-4708-3; tpb, 2014, ISBN 1-4012-4929-9) collects:
    - American Vampire: The Long Road to Hell (written and drawn by Rafael Albuquerque from a plot by Snyder and Albuquerque, one-shot, Vertigo, 2013)
    - American Vampire Anthology #1: "The Man Comes Around" (with Rafael Albuquerque, Vertigo, 2013)
      - Also includes a number of stories from various other creators:
        - "Lost Colony" (written by Jason Aaron, drawn by Declan Shalvey)
        - "Bleeding Kansas" (written by Rafael Albuquerque, drawn by Ivo Milazzo)
        - "Canadian Vampire" (written by Jeff Lemire, drawn by Ray Fawkes)
        - "Greed" (written and drawn by Becky Cloonan)
        - "The Producers" (written and drawn by Francesco Francavilla)
        - "Essence of Life" (written by Gail Simone, drawn by Tula Lotay)
        - "Last Night" (written and drawn by Gabriel Bá and Fábio Moon)
        - "Portland, 1940" (written by Greg Rucka, drawn by John Paul Leon)
  - American Vampire: Second Cycle (with Rafael Albuquerque and Matías Bergara (#5), Vertigo, 2014–2016) collected as:
    - American Vampire Volume 7 (collects #1–5, hc, 144 pages, 2015, ISBN 1-4012-4882-9; tpb, 2015, ISBN 1-4012-5432-2)
    - American Vampire Volume 8 (collects #6–11, hc, 168 pages, 2016, ISBN 1-4012-5433-0; tpb, 2016, ISBN 1-4012-6258-9)
  - American Vampire Anthology #2: "Opening Shot" (with Rafael Albuquerque) and "Brother's Keeper" (with Afua Richardson, Vertigo, 2016)
    - Also includes a number of stories from various other creators:
      - "Teahouse" (written by Joëlle Jones, drawn by Christopher Mitten)
      - "Bride" (written by Marguerite Bennett, drawn by Mirka Andolfo)
      - "The Bleeding Nun" (written by Clay McLeod Chapman, drawn by Richard Isanove)
      - "The Cut" (written by Steve Orlando, drawn by Artyom Trakhanov)
      - "Traveling Companion" (written by Elliott Kalan, drawn by Andrea Mutti)
      - "When the Cold Wind Blows" (written by Shawn Aldridge, drawn by Szymon Kudranski)
      - "England's Dreaming" (written by Kieron Gillen, drawn by Leila del Duca)
      - "Devil's Own Luck" (written by Rafael Albuquerque, drawn by Renato Guedes)
  - American Vampire 1976 #1–10 (with Rafael Albuquerque, DC Black Label, 2020–2021) collected as American Vampire 1976 (hc, 264 pages, 2021, ISBN 1-77951-267-8)
  - American Vampire Omnibus Volume 1 (American Vampire #1-27, American Vampire: Survival of the Fittest #1-6, and American Vampire: Lord of Nightmares #1-5, hc, 984 pages, 2022, ISBN 1-4012-9884-2)
  - American Vampire Omnibus Volume 2 (collects American Vampire #28-34, American Vampire: The Long Road to Hell #1, American Vampire: Anthology #1-2, American Vampire: Second Cycle #1-11, and American Vampire 1976 #1-10, hc, 928 pages, 2022, ISBN 1-4012-9884-2)
- Batman:
  - Detective Comics:
    - Batman: The Black Mirror (hc, 288 pages, 2011, ISBN 1-4012-3206-X; tpb, 2013, ISBN 1-4012-3207-8) collects:
      - "The Black Mirror" (with Jock, in #871–873, 2011)
      - "Skeleton Cases" (with Francesco Francavilla, in #871–872 and 874, 2011)
      - "Lost Boys" (with Francesco Francavilla, in #875, 2011)
      - "Hungry City" (with Jock, in #876–878, 2011)
      - "Skeleton Key" (with Francesco Francavilla, in #879, 2011)
      - "My Dark Architect" (with Jock, in #880, 2011)
      - "The Face in the Glass" (with Jock and Francesco Francavilla, in #881, 2011)
    - Batman: 80 Years of the Bat Family (tpb, 400 pages, 2020, ISBN 1-77950-658-9) includes:
      - "Batman's Longest Case" (with Greg Capullo, co-feature in #1000, 2019)
      - Joker: 80th Anniversary 100-Page Super Spectacular: "Scars" (with Jock, anthology one-shot, 2020)
    - "As Always" (with Ivan Reis, co-feature in #1027, 2020)
  - Batman: Gates of Gotham #1–5 (co-written by Snyder and Kyle Higgins, art by Trevor McCarthy and Derec Donovan + Dustin Nguyen (#4), 2011) collected as Batman: Gates of Gotham (tpb, 144 pages, 2012, ISBN 1-4012-3341-4; hc, 2018, ISBN 1-4012-8420-5)
  - Batman vol. 2 (with Greg Capullo, Rafael Albuquerque (co-features in #8–11 and 21–24), Jason Fabok (Annual #1), Becky Cloonan (#12), Andy Clarke (co-features in #12, 0, 25), Jock (co-features in #13–16), Andy Kubert (#18), Alex Maleev (co-features in #18–20), Wes Craig (Annual #2), Dustin Nguyen (#28), Matteo Scalera (#34), Jock (#44) and Yanick Paquette (#49–50); co-features in #8–12, 0, 13–16 and 18–25 as well as issues #28, 49–50 and Annual #1 are co-written by Snyder and James Tynion IV; Annual #2 is co-written by Snyder and Marguerite Bennett; issue #34 is co-written by Snyder and Gerry Duggan; issue #44 is co-written by Snyder and Brian Azzarello, 2011–2016) collected as:
    - The Court of Owls (collects #1–7, hc, 176 pages, 2012, ISBN 1-4012-3541-7; tpb, 2013, ISBN 1-4012-3542-5)
    - The City of Owls (collects #8–12 and Annual #1, hc, 208 pages, 2013, ISBN 1-4012-3777-0; tpb, 2013, ISBN 93-5111-661-1)
    - Death of the Family (collects #13–17, hc, 176 pages, 2013, ISBN 1-4012-4234-0; tpb, 2014, ISBN 1-4012-4602-8)
    - Zero Year: Secret City (collects #21–24, hc, 176 pages, 2014, ISBN 1-4012-4508-0; tpb, 2014, ISBN 1-4012-4933-7)
    - Zero Year: Dark City (collects #25–27 and 29–33, hc, 256 pages, 2014, ISBN 1-4012-4885-3; tpb, 2015, ISBN 1-4012-5335-0)
    - Graveyard Shift (collects #0, 18–20, 28, 34 and Annual #2, hc, 224 pages, 2015, ISBN 1-4012-5230-3; tpb, 2015, ISBN 1-4012-5753-4)
    - Endgame (collects #35–40, hc, 192 pages, 2015, ISBN 1-4012-5689-9; tpb, 2016, ISBN 1-4012-6116-7)
    - Superheavy (collects DC Sneak Peek: Batman digital one-shot and #41–45, hc, 176 pages, 2016, ISBN 1-4012-5969-3; tpb, 2016, ISBN 1-4012-6630-4)
    - Bloom (collects #46–50, hc, 200 pages, 2016, ISBN 1-4012-6462-X; tpb, 2016, ISBN 1-4012-6922-2)
      - Includes the "Twenty-Seven" short story (art by Sean Gordon Murphy) from Detective Comics vol. 2 #27 (2014)
    - Epilogue (includes #51, hc, 144 pages, 2016, ISBN 1-4012-6773-4; tpb, 2017, ISBN 1-4012-6832-3)
      - Also collects the Batman: Futures End one-shot (co-written by Snyder and Ray Fawkes, art by Aco, 2014)
      - Also collects the Batman: Rebirth one-shot (co-written by Snyder and Tom King, art by Mikel Janín and David Finch, 2016)
    - Batman by Scott Snyder and Greg Capullo Omnibus Volume 1 (collects #0–33, 23.2 and Annual #1–2, hc, 900 pages, 2019, ISBN 1-4012-9884-2)
    - Batman by Scott Snyder and Greg Capullo Omnibus Volume 2 (collects #34–52, Annual #3–4, Batman: Last Knight on Earth #1–3 and all short stories and one-shots, hc, 928 pages, 2021, ISBN 1-77951-326-7)
  - Talon #0–7 (co-written by Snyder and James Tynion IV, art by Guillem March and Juan José Ryp (#2), 2012–2013) collected as Talon: Scourge of the Owls (tpb, 192 pages, 2013, ISBN 1-4012-3887-4)
  - Batman Eternal (co-written by Snyder, James Tynion IV, Ray Fawkes, Kyle Higgins, Tim Seeley and John Layman, art by various artists, 2014–2015) collected as:
    - Volume 1 (collects #1–21, tpb, 480 pages, 2014, ISBN 1-4012-5173-0)
    - Volume 2 (collects #22–34, tpb, 448 pages, 2015, ISBN 1-4012-5231-1)
    - Volume 3 (collects #35–52, tpb, 424 pages, 2015, ISBN 1-4012-5752-6)
    - Omnibus (collects #1–52 and Batman vol. 2 #28, hc, 1,208 pages, 2019, ISBN 1-4012-9417-0)
  - Batman and Robin Eternal (written and drawn by various creators from a plot by Snyder and James Tynion IV, 2015–2016) collected as:
    - Volume 1 (collects #1–13, tpb, 272 pages, 2016, ISBN 1-4012-5967-7)
    - Volume 2 (collects #14–26, tpb, 336 pages, 2016, ISBN 1-4012-6248-1)
  - All-Star Batman (with John Romita Jr. (#1–5), Declan Shalvey (co-features in #1–4), Francesco Francavilla (co-features in #6–9), Jock (#6, 9), Tula Lotay (#7), Giuseppe Camuncoli (#8) and Rafael Albuquerque (#10–14), 2016–2017) collected as:
    - My Own Worst Enemy (collects #1–5, hc, 160 pages, 2017, ISBN 1-4012-6978-8; tpb, 2017, ISBN 1-4012-7442-0)
    - Ends of the Earth (collects #6–9, hc, 144 pages, 2017, ISBN 1-4012-7443-9; tpb, 2018, ISBN 1-4012-7789-6)
    - The First Ally (collects #10–14, hc, 176 pages, 2018, ISBN 1-4012-7726-8; tpb, 2018, ISBN 1-4012-8430-2)
    - All-Star Batman by Scott Snyder: The Deluxe Edition (collects #1–14, ohc, 584 pages, September 2024
  - Batman vol. 3 Annual #1: "Silent Night" (co-written by Snyder and Ray Fawkes, art by Declan Shalvey, 2016)
  - Batman/The Shadow #1–6 (co-written by Snyder and Steve Orlando, art by Riley Rossmo, 2017) collected as
    - Batman/The Shadow: The Murder Geniuses (hc, 168 pages, 2017, ISBN 1-4012-7527-3; tpb, 2019, ISBN 1-4012-8561-9)
  - Batman and the Signal #1–3 (co-written by Snyder and Tony Patrick, art by Cully Hamner, 2018) collected as
    - Batman and the Signal (tpb, 144 pages, 2018, ISBN 1-4012-7967-8)
  - The Batman Who Laughs (hc, 232 pages, 2019, ISBN 1-4012-9403-0; tpb, 2021, ISBN 1-77950-446-2) collects:
    - The Batman Who Laughs #1–7 (with Jock, 2019)
    - The Batman Who Laughs: The Grim Knight (co-written by Snyder and James Tynion IV, art by Eduardo Risso, one-shot, 2019)
  - Batman: Last Knight on Earth #1–3 (with Greg Capullo, DC Black Label, 2019–2020) collected as
    - Batman: Last Knight on Earth (hc, 184 pages, 2020, ISBN 1-4012-9496-0; tpb, 2021, ISBN 1-77951-318-6)
  - Tales from the Dark Multiverse: Knightfall (co-written by Snyder and Kyle Higgins, art by Javi Fernandez, one-shot, 2019) collected in
    - Tales from the Dark Multiverse (hc, 448 pages, 2020, ISBN 1-77950-137-4; tpb, 2021, ISBN 1-77950-815-8)
  - Batman: Black and White vol. 3 #6: "A Thousand Words" (with John Romita Jr., anthology, 2021) collected in
    - Batman: Black and White (hc, 312 pages, 2021, ISBN 1-77951-196-5)
  - Batman/Fortnite: Foundation (co-written by Snyder, Christos Gage and Donald Mustard, art by Joshua Hixson, one-shot, 2021)
  - Absolute Batman #1– (art by Nick Dragotta, 2024–ongoing)
  - Absolute Batman: Ark M Special (co-written by Snyder and Frank Tieri, art by Joshua Hixson, one-shot, 2026)
- Superman:
  - Flashpoint: Project Superman #1–3 (co-written by Snyder and Lowell Francis, art by Gene Ha, 2011) collected in
    - Flashpoint: The World of Flashpoint Featuring Superman (tpb, 320 pages, 2012, ISBN 1-4012-3434-8)
  - Superman Unchained #1–9 (with Jim Lee and Dustin Nguyen, 2013–2014) collected as
    - Superman Unchained (hc, 352 pages, 2014, ISBN 1-4012-4522-6; tpb, 2016, ISBN 1-4012-5093-9)
  - Action Comics #1000: "The Fifth Season" (with Rafael Albuquerque, co-feature, 2018)
- Swamp Thing vol. 5 #0–18 (with Yanick Paquette, Marco Rudy, Francesco Francavilla (#10), Kano (#0) and Andy Belanger + Becky Cloonan (Annual #1); Annual #1 is co-written by Snyder and Scott Tuft, 2011–2013) collected as:
  - Raise Them Bones (collects #1–7, tpb, 168 pages, 2012, ISBN 1-4012-3462-3)
  - Family Tree (collects #8–11, 0 and Annual #1, tpb, 160 pages, 2013, ISBN 1-4012-3843-2)
  - Rotworld: The Green Kingdom (collects #12–18, tpb, 208 pages, 2013, ISBN 1-4012-4264-2)
  - Swamp Thing by Scott Snyder (collects #0–18 and Annual #1, hc, 512 pages, 2015, ISBN 1-4012-5870-0)
- The Wake #1–10 (with Sean Gordon Murphy, Vertigo, 2013–2014) collected as The Wake (hc, 256 pages, 2014, ISBN 1-4012-4523-4; tpb, 2015, ISBN 1-4012-5491-8)
- Dark Nights: Metal:
  - Dark Days: The Road to Metal (hc, 256 pages, 2018, ISBN 1-4012-7819-1; tpb, 2019, ISBN 1-4012-8762-X) includes:
    - Dark Days: The Forge (co-written by Snyder and James Tynion IV, art by Jim Lee, Andy Kubert and John Romita Jr., one-shot, 2017)
    - Dark Days: The Casting (co-written by Snyder and James Tynion IV, art by Jim Lee, Andy Kubert and John Romita Jr., one-shot, 2017)
  - Dark Nights: Metal (hc, 216 pages, 2018, ISBN 1-4012-7732-2; tpb, 2019, ISBN 1-4012-8858-8) collects:
    - Dark Nights: Metal #1–6 (with Greg Capullo, 2017–2018)
    - Batman: Lost (co-written by Snyder, James Tynion IV and Joshua Williamson, art by Doug Mahnke, Yanick Paquette and Jorge Jiménez, one-shot, 2018)
    - Dark Knights Rising: The Wild Hunt (co-written by Snyder, James Tynion IV, Joshua Williamson and Grant Morrison, art by Howard Porter, Jorge Jiménez and Doug Mahnke, one-shot, 2018)
  - Dark Nights: Metal Omnibus (collects #1–6, Dark Days: The Forge #1, Dark Days: The Casting #1, Batman: Lost #1, Dark Knights Rising: The Wild Hunt #1, and all short stories and one-shots, hc, 760 pages, 2023, ISBN 1-77951-703-3)
- Wonder Woman:
  - New Talent Showcase 2017: "The Archive" (with Ibrahim Moustafa, anthology one-shot, 2018)
  - Wonder Woman #750: "A Brave New World" (with Bryan Hitch, co-feature, 2020) collected in
    - Wonder Woman: The Four Horsewomen (tpb, 336 pages, 2021, ISBN 1-77950-910-3)
- New Challengers #1–6 (co-written by Snyder and Aaron Gillespie, art by Andy Kubert (#1–2) and V Ken Marion, 2018) collected as
  - New Challengers (tpb, 144 pages, 2018, ISBN 1-4012-8344-6)
- Justice League:
  - Justice League: No Justice #1–4 (co-written with James Tynion IV and Joshua Williamson, art by Francis Manapul, Marcus To (#2–3) and Riley Rossmo (#3), 2018). Collected as.
    - Justice League: No Justice (tpb, 144 pages, 2018, ISBN 1-4012-8334-9) collects:
  - Justice League vol. 4 #1–39 (with Jim Cheung (#1, 7, 14–16), Jorge Jiménez, Francis Manapul (#10–11, 35–36), Stephen Segovia (#14–16), Bruno Redondo (#29, 33–34) and Howard Porter (#32, 34, 36), 2018–2020)
    - Collected in Trade Paperbacks
      - Justice League Volume 1: The Totality (collects #1–7, 144 pages, November 2018)
      - Justice League Volume 2: The Graveyard of the Guards (collects #8–12, Justice League/Aquaman: Drowned Earth #1 & Aquaman/Justice League: Drowned Earth #1, 208 pages, May 2019)
      - Justice League Volume 3: Hawkworld (collects #13–18, and annual #1, 184 pages, July 2019)
      - Justice League Volume 4: The Sixth Dimension (collects #19–28, 256 pages, November 2019)
      - Justice League Volume 5: Justice/Doom War (collects #29–39, 272 pages, June 2020)
    - Collected as Oversized Hardcovers.
      - Justice League by Scott Snyder Book One (includes #1–4, 6–7 and 9–11, hc, 384 pages, 2019, ISBN 1-4012-9521-5)
        - Also collects Justice League vol. 4 #5, 8 and 12–13 (written by James Tynion IV, drawn by various artists, 2018–2019)
        - Also collects Justice League/Aquaman: Drowned Earth #1 (written by James Tynion IV, drawn by Howard Porter, 2018)
        - Also collects Aquaman/Justice League: Drowned Earth #1 (written by Snyder, art by Francis Manapul and Howard Porter, 2019)
      - Justice League by Scott Snyder Book Two (includes #14–17, 19–21, 23–25 and Annual #1, hc, 376 pages, 2020, ISBN 1-77950-584-1)
        - Issues #14–16 and Annual #1 are scripted by James Tynion IV from a plot by Snyder and James Tynion IV.
        - Also collects Justice League vol. 4 #18 and 22 (written by James Tynion IV, drawn by various artists, 2019)
      - Justice League by Scott Snyder Book Three (includes #29–39, hc, 336 pages, 2021, ISBN 1-77951-493-X)
        - Also collects Justice League vol. 4 #26–28 (written by James Tynion IV, drawn by various artists, 2019)
        - Issues #29–35 are scripted by James Tynion IV from a plot by Snyder and James Tynion IV.
  - DC's Year of the Villain: "Chapter 1: Doom" (with Jim Cheung, anthology one-shot, 2019) collected in
    - Year of the Villain: Hell Arisen (tpb, 144 pages, 2020, ISBN 1-77950-242-7)
- Dark Nights: Death Metal:
  - Dark Nights: Death Metal #1–7 (with Greg Capullo, 2020–2021) collected as.
    - Dark Nights: Death Metal: Deluxe Edition (hc, 217 pages, 2021, ISBN 1-77950-794-1)
    - Dark Nights: Death Metal (tpb, 217 pages, 2022, ISBN 1-77951-511-1)
    - Absolute Dark Nights: Death Metal (hc, 288 pages, 2023, ISBN 1-77952-156-1)
  - Dark Nights: Death Metal — The Darkest Knight (tpb, 208 page, 2021, ISBN 1-77950-792-5) includes:
    - Dark Nights: Death Metal — Legends of the Dark Knights: "The Darkest Knight" (co-written by Snyder, James Tynion IV and Joshua Williamson, art by Tony Daniel, anthology one-shot, 2020)
    - Dark Nights: Death Metal Guidebook: "The Fall of Earth" (co-written by Snyder, James Tynion IV and Joshua Williamson, art by Doug Mahnke, anthology one-shot, 2020)
    - Dark Nights: Death Metal — Trinity Crisis (with Francis Manapul, one-shot, 2020)
  - Dark Nights: Death Metal — The Multiverse Who Laughs (tpb, 208 pages, 2021, ISBN 1-77950-793-3) includes:
    - Dark Nights: Death Metal — The Multiverse Who Laughs: "Robin King" (co-written by Snyder, James Tynion IV and Joshua Williamson, art by Juan Gedeon, anthology one-shot, 2021)
    - Dark Nights: Death Metal — Secret Origin (co-written by Snyder and Geoff Johns, art by Jerry Ordway, Francis Manapul, Ryan Benjamin and Paul Pelletier, one-shot, 2021)
  - Dark Nights: Death Metal — War of the Multiverses (tpb, 176 pages, 2021, ISBN 1-77951-006-3) includes:
    - Dark Nights: Death Metal — The Last Stories of the DC Universe: "The Titans" (co-written by Snyder, James Tynion IV and Joshua Williamson, art by Travis Moore, anthology one-shot, 2021)
    - Dark Nights: Death Metal — The Last 52: War of the Multiverses: "Wonder Woman" (co-written by Snyder and Joshua Williamson, art by Dexter Soy and Scott Koblish, anthology one-shot, 2021)
- Infinite Frontier (framing sequence; co-written by Snyder, James Tynion IV and Joshua Williamson, art by John Timms, anthology one-shot, 2021) collected in.
  - Infinite Frontier (hc, 352 pages, 2022, ISBN 1-77951-424-7)
- The Conjuring: The Lover #1: "The Ferryman" (with Denys Cowan, co-feature, DC Horror, 2021) collected in.
  - The Conjuring: The Lover (hc, 144 pages, 2022, ISBN 1-77951-508-1)
- DC All In Special #1 (co-written by Snyder and Joshua Williamson, art by Daniel Sampere and Wes Craig, anthology one-shot, 2024)
- DC K.O.:
  - DC K.O. #1–5 (co-plotted with Joshua Williamson, art by Javier Fernandez, 2025–2026) collected as.
    - DC K.O. (hc, 208 pages, 2026, ISBN 1-799510-840)
  - DC K.O.: The Joker vs. Red Hood (co-written by Snyder and Joshua Williamson, art by Dustin Nguyen, one-shot, 2026)

=== Image Comics ===
- Severed #1–7 (co-written by Snyder and Scott Tuft, art by Attila Futaki, 2011–2012) collected as Severed (hc, 192 pages, 2012, ISBN 1-60706-529-0; tpb, 2013, ISBN 1-60706-715-3)
- Wytches (with Jock):
  - Wytches #1–6 (2014–2015) collected as Wytches (tpb, 144 pages, 2015, ISBN 1-63215-380-7)
  - Image Plus vol. 2 #1–12: "Bad Egg" (co-feature, 2017–2018)
  - Wytches: Bad Egg Halloween Special (collection of all episodes from Image Plus with the concluding thirteenth chapter, 2018)
  - Image! #7: "Only the Beginning" (co-feature, 2022)
- A.D.: After Death #1–3 (with Jeff Lemire, 2016–2017) collected as
  - A.D.: After Death (hc, 256 pages, 2017, ISBN 1-63215-868-X)
- Spawn #300: "Chapter 2" (with Todd McFarlane, 2019) collected in Spawn: The Record-Breaker (tpb, 184 pages, 2022, ISBN 1-5343-2298-1)
- Undiscovered Country (co-written by Snyder and Charles Soule, art by Giuseppe Camuncoli, 2019–ongoing) collected as:
  - Destiny (collects #1–6, tpb, 176 pages, 2020, ISBN 1-5343-1599-3)
  - Unity (collects #7–12, tpb, 176 pages, 2021, ISBN 1-5343-1840-2)
  - Possibility (collects #13–18, tpb, 176 pages, 2022, ISBN 1-5343-1929-8)
  - Disunity (collects #19–24 and Destiny Man Special, tpb, 168 pages, 2024, ISBN 1-77952-477-3)
  - Bounty (collects #25–30, tpb, 176 pages, 2023, ISBN 1-5343-2473-9)
- Nocterra #1–16 (with Tony Daniel, March 2021 – September 2023) collected as:
  - Full Throttle Dark (collects #1–6, tpb, 168 pages, 2021, ISBN 1-5343-1994-8)
  - Pedal to the Metal (collects #7–11, tpb, 144 pages, 2021, ISBN 1-5343-2234-5)
    - Includes Nocterra: Blacktop Bill Special (written by Snyder, art by Denys Cowan, 2022)
  - No Brakes (collects #12-16, tpb, 144 pages, 2023, ISBN 1-5343-9978-X)
    - Includes Nocterra: Val Special (written by Snyder, art by Francis Manapul, 2022) and Nocterra: Nemesis Special (written by Snyder, art by Liam Sharp, 2023)

=== Dark Horse Comics ===
- Black Hammer: Visions #8 (with David Rubín, anthology, 2021) collected in
  - Black Hammer: Visions Volume 2 (hc, 120 pages, 2022, ISBN 1-5067-2551-1)
- We Have Demons #1–3 (with Greg Capullo, reprint of Comixology digital series, 2022) collected in
  - We Have Demons (tpb, 200 pages, 2022, ISBN 1-5067-2833-2)
- Night of the Ghoul #1–3 (with Francesco Francavilla, reprint of Comixology digital series, 2022) collected in
  - Night of the Ghoul (tpb, 192 pages, 2023, ISBN 1-5067-2835-9)
- Clear #1–3 (with Francis Manapul, reprint of Comixology digital series, 2023) collected in
  - Night of the Ghoul (tpb, 184 pages, 2023, ISBN 1-5067-2832-4)
- Barnstormers: A Ballad of Love and Murder (with Tula Lotay, reprint of Comixology digital series, 2023) collected in
  - Barnstormers: A Ballad of Love and Murder (tpb, 200 pages, 2024, ISBN 1-5067-2830-8)
- Canary #1–3 (with Dan Panosian, reprint of Comixology digital series, 2023–2024) collected in
  - Canary (tpb, 184 pages, 2024, ISBN 1-5067-2831-6)
- Dudley Datson and the Forever Machine #1–3 (with Jamal Igle, reprint of Comixology digital series, 2024) collected in
  - Dudley Datson and the Forever Machine (tpb, 160 pages, 2024, ISBN 1-5067-3092-2)
- Book of Evil (with Jock, reprint of Comixology digital series, 2024) collected in
  - Book of Evil (tpb, 192 pages, 2024, ISBN 1-5067-3498-7)
- Duck and Cover #1–3 (with Rafael Albuquerque, reprint of Comixology digital series, 2024) collected in
  - Duck and Cover (tpb, 152 pages, 2025, ISBN 1-5067-3497-9)
- By a Thread (co-written by Snyder and Jack Snyder, art by Valeria Favoccia) collected in Duck and Cover (tpb, 136 pages, 2024, ISBN 1-5067-4261-0)

=== Other publishers ===
- IDW Publishing:
  - In the Dark: A Horror Anthology: "That One That Got Away" (with Nate Powell, 336 pages, 2014, ISBN 1-61377-934-8)
  - Love is Love: "The Door was Open to Us" (one-page prose story illustrated by Jock, anthology graphic novel, 144 pages, 2016, ISBN 1-63140-939-5)
  - Dark Spaces: Wildfire #1–5 (with Hayden Sherman, 2022) collected as
    - Dark Spaces: Wildfire (tpb, 160 pages, 2023, ISBN 1-68405-961-5)
  - Dark Spaces: Dungeon #1–5 (with Hayden Sherman, 2023–2024) collected as
    - Dark Spaces: Dungeon (tpb, 128 pages, 2024, ISBN 979-8-88724-110-4)
- Kodansha:
  - Attack on Titan Anthology: "Under the Surface" (co-written by Snyder and Ray Fawkes, art by Rafael Albuquerque) collected in Attack on Titan Anthology (tpb, 256 pages, 2016, ISBN 1-63236-258-9)
- Comixology (digital series — with collected editions published in print via Dark Horse):
  - We Have Demons #1–3 (with Greg Capullo, 2021–2022)
  - Clear #1–6 (with Francis Manapul, 2021–2022)
  - Night of the Ghoul #1–6 (with Francesco Francavilla, 2021–2022)
  - Barnstormers: A Ballad of Love and Murder #1–5 (with Tula Lotay, 2022–2023)
  - Dudley Datson and the Forever Machine #1–5 (with Jamal Igle, 2022–2023)
  - Canary #1–6 (with Dan Panosian, 2022–2023)
  - Book of Evil #1–4 (prose story illustrated by Jock, 2022–2023)
  - Duck and Cover #1–4 (with Rafael Albuquerque, 2023–2024)
  - By a Thread #1–4 (co-written by Snyder and Jack Snyder, art by Valeria Favoccia, 2023–2024)
  - By a Thread Season 2 #1–6 (co-written by Snyder and Jack Snyder, art by Valeria Favoccia, 2025–2026)
  - Chain (with Ariela Kristantina, ongoing series intended for publication under Snyder's own Best Jackett Press label — initially announced in 2020)
- Meanwhile… A Comic Shop Anthology: "Suspension" (with Jock) collected in Meanwhile… A Comic Shop Anthology (90 pages, Comics Conspiracy Inc., 2023, Barcode: 7-94677-20369-6-00111)
- DSTLRY:
  - The Devil's Cut: "White Boat" (with Francesco Francavilla, co-feature, 2023)
  - White Boat #1–3 (with Francesco Francavilla, 2024–2026)
  - You Won't Feel a Thing #1 (with Jock, 2025)

Preceded by David Hine	Detective Comics writer 2010–2011	Succeeded by Tony S. Daniel
Preceded by Joshua Dysart	Swamp Thing writer 2011–2013	Succeeded by Charles Soule
Preceded by Fabian Nicieza	Batman writer 2011–2016	Succeeded by Tom King
Preceded by Christopher Priest	Justice League writer 2018–2020	Succeeded by Robert Venditti
