= Wytches (comics) =

Six-issue comic book limited series

Publication information
- Publisher: Image Comics
- Format: Limited series
- Genre: Horror
- Publication date: October 2014 – March 2015
- No. of issues: 6

Creative team
- Created by: Scott Snyder; Jock
- Written by: Scott Snyder
- Artist: Jock
- Colorist: Matt Hollingsworth

Wytches is a six-issue comic book limited series written by Scott Snyder and illustrated by Jock. The first issue of the series released on 8 October 2014 and is currently published through Image Comics. The rights for a film adaptation have been purchased by Plan B Entertainment, but it has since evolved into an animated series for Amazon Prime Video.

== Synopsis ==
The series follows the Rook family, in particular their daughter Sailor. The family moved to the town of Litchfield, New Hampshire, following an incident involving Sailor and a particularly vicious school bully named Annie. In this incident, Sailor was attacked and Annie went missing, prompting rumors that Sailor killed her. Eventually the speculation grows to the point where Sailor's father Charlie and mother Lucy decide that the only thing to do is move the family to a neighboring town in the hopes of starting over again. This proves to be unsuccessful as some of the rumors have followed the family and Sailor still feels ostracized from her new school peers. The family is also largely unaware that the town is home to its own supernatural secrets, in particular a tradition where a person will pledge another to strange beings, wytches, in the nearby forest in order to gain a boon from them.

Sailor is eventually captured by the wytches after being "pledged", smeared with a green liquid that attracts them and identifies the pledge as a sacrifice. Charlie is attacked by a hunter at the same time, who tells him how to hide from and fight the wytches, whose lair is hidden beneath an enormous tree with ginger root clumps growing above ground. Charlie and Sailor escape and race home, closely pursued by a large number of devotees of the wytches. At home, Charlie and Sailor are attacked by Lucy, who reveals she pledged Sailor in exchange for having her paralysis healed, as well as paying a debt to the wytches owed by her great-grandfather. She begs Charlie to pledge Sailor again, after which they'll erase their memories of her and be able to restart their lives. Charlie smears the pledge on himself and Lucy, telling Sailor to run and find the Irons, a family of wytch hunters. Sailor escapes through the basement, and is confronted by a large number of her schoolmates, all of whom have received boons from the wytches. Sailor uses a garden sprayer to dose them all with pledge, and the wytches slaughter all of them as Sailor escapes.

== Development ==
Snyder came up with the idea for Wytches after recalling a childhood experience where he and a friend made up stories about a family of satanists living in a nearby Pennsylvania forest that were constantly trying to capture the two boys. He later revisited the area out of nostalgia and saw a moving object that looked vaguely human, which made Snyder think that there was something in the forest that had been waiting for him to return. This idea translated into the concept of witches that would patiently wait for their victims as opposed to chasing after them, as they knew that the victims would inevitably be drawn back to the witches' location. This further expanded into the idea that the witches would have "this incredible knowledge of their ancient natural science" that would enable them to perform various feats like curing various illnesses and extending life spans, which they would trade with locals in exchange for the individual pledging a person to the witches. Snyder also chose to have the witches not possess magical abilities and instead be "a bestial, primal creature that lives deep in the woods" and decided to add in the concept of parental fear, that a parent would be ultimately incapable of protecting their children 24 hours a day, regardless of effort.

== Television adaptation ==
Shortly after the series released its first issue in October 2014, Plan B Entertainment announced that they had purchased the film rights to the comic with the intent to turn it into a motion picture.

On April 6, 2021, Snyder announced that Plan B was now working on a television series adaptation of the comic with Amazon Prime Video. Snyder wrote the first episode and Jock created the storyboards. The show was officially greenlit as an animated series on February 8, 2023.

== Reception ==
ComicsAlliance and Comic Book Resources both praised the first issue of the series, and Comic Book Resources noted that although the issue "has a few minor slips" it was ultimately "at once outlandish and grotesque and alarmingly intimate in the way it dishes out horror." IGN also gave a favorable review, writing "Wytches #1 proves a great debut, driven by the artistic pairing of Scott Snyder and Jock. The narrative, though rushed, is an intriguing one, Snyder ably balancing the mystery with the menace. The art by Jock is both shocking and enticing, made better by the moody colors provided by Matt Hollingsworth. This is a book you'll want to be reading."
