= AK Comics =

Egyptian superhero comic publisher

AK Comics is an Egyptian-based superhero comic publishing company, and the first large scale production of the genre in the Middle East. The company was founded by Ayman Kandeel. Dærick Gröss Sr. is the editor-in-chief; Waleed Al-Telbany is the art director; Mohie El-Dein Sideiq is the Arabic-language editor and Sara Kareem is the English-language editor of the company.

AK Comics first began publishing monthly titles in 2004, and its comics are produced in both Arabic and English. The comics are collectively titled Middle East Heroes.

== Overview ==
As explained in the first inside page of various issues, the intention of AK Comics is "to fill the cultural gap created over the years by providing essentially Arab role models, in our case, Arab superheroes, to become a source of pride to our young generations."

== Superheroes ==
There are four superheroes:

- Zein, a philosophy professor and the last of an ancient line of pharaohs. He lives in Origin City, which resembles Cairo, and uses ancient technology and superpowers to thwart evil-doers.
- Aya, a law student driven to fighting crime when her mother is wrongly accused of murdering her father. She has no superpowers of her own, but fights for justice and gender equality.
- Jalila, a female scientist who at the age of 16 survived an explosion at the Dimodona nuclear plant (a reference to the Dimona nuclear plant used by Israel to build its undeclared nuclear arsenal), and gained super-powers from the radiation. She protects the City of All Faiths (based on Jerusalem) from the warring Zios Army and the United Liberation Force.
- Rakan, a medieval warrior who survived a Mongol invasion of Mesopotamia and was raised by a saber-toothed cat. His country is constantly attacked by Mongols, Turks and Crusaders. Through the techniques of "sheba" (wisdom and peace) he is an invincible warrior. Rakan's most known enemy to date is ChessMaster, co-created by Rafael Albuquerque.

Apart from Rakan, who inhabits a sort of sword and sorcery world, all the superheroes live in the near future, in the immediate aftermath of the "55-Year War" between unnamed superpowers, when terrorists and criminals constantly threaten to destroy the fragile peace.

Although the protagonists are clearly Middle Eastern, for the sake of neutrality there is no direct reference to the religion or ethnicity of the characters. As explained in one issue: "The religious backgrounds of the heroes remain undisclosed so that no religion or faith can be perceived as better than another."

== Reception ==
AK Comics started an initial United States venture in 2004 and found the market crowded.

AK Comics sells mainly in Egypt and is beginning to be distributed in other Middle Eastern states, as well as having overseas subscriptions (particularly in the United States). As of September 2005 the comics sell 15,000 copies an issue, and are beginning to break even. Censorship and a lack of local artists are issues for the company; besides had the initial storylines started by 'Studio G Pub' studio, most of the artwork is produced in Brazil by 'PopArt Comics Studio','Daniel Brandão Studio' and 'Legio Studio'. Among some subtle differences on displaying the characters in the middle-east ambient are the sensitive reduction of female features, like the size of breasts and skimpy outfits used by them. Nashar said that in certain cases local censors went through each page blackening out breasts with markers, and only the titles featuring the male characters are currently distributed in Saudi Arabia.

The comics were received very favorably in the United States, where sales averaged 4,500 copies per issue for the first four issues released. The comics can be ordered at any comic book store through the normal Diamond distribution channels. They are also doing direct sales and subscriptions through their L.A. partner.

The comic books are also available in the UK from comic book stores or by subscription from the AK Comics website. They have a loyal following in the UK, especially amongst Arabic learners - although the comic books are also available in English.

Pilots have been made for a TV series to be broadcast on Arab satellite channels and the first of these was shown at the Cairo Animation Festival in 2006.
