= Rafael Albuquerque =

Brazilian comic book creator

- Born: Rafael Albuquerque; December 4, 1981 (age 44) Porto Alegre, Brazil
- Areas: Writer, Penciller, Inker, Colourist
- Notable works: Blue Beetle; 24Seven; American Vampire
- Awards: IGN Best of 2010 Award for Best New Series; 2011 Eisner Award for Best New Series; 2011 Harvey Award for Best New Series; 2018 Inkpot Award

Rafael Albuquerque (born April 12, 1981) is a Brazilian comic book creator primarily for his artwork on titles such as DC Comics' Blue Beetle and as illustrator and co-creator of American Vampire. Though primarily a penciler and inker of interior comic art, he has also done work as a cover artist, colorist and writer.

== Early life and influences ==
Rafael Albuquerque was born in 1981 in Porto Alegre, Brazil.

== Career ==
Albuquerque begun his professional career working in advertising, doing work for local companies. He began his comic book career in 2002, after posting his portfolio on the Internet, doing work for the Egyptian publishing company AK Comics, which published books for the Middle East.

In 2005, Albuquerque published the creator-owned graphic novel crime story Rumble in La Rambla. It would be published in the United States in 2007 by Image Comics under the title Crimeland. He collaborated with writers Keith Giffen and Alan Grant in 2006 by illustrating issues #4 and #5 of Jeremiah Harm and the first issue of Pirate Tales for Boom! Studios. In 2006 and 2007, he illustrated the mini series Savage Brothers, also for Boom! Studios.

In 2007 he drew Wonderlost #2 by writer C. B. Cebulski, and "Oil for Blood", a story in volume 2 of 24Seven, both published by Image Comics. The latter was nominated for the 2008 Eisner Award for Best Anthology (though the anthology's editor, Ivan Brandon, was the named nominee, and not the individual creators).

Albuquerque first gained the notice of U.S. comics readers with his work as the regular artist on the DC Comics monthly series Blue Beetle, which he drew from issues #10 (February 2007) to #34 (February 2009). The series proved to be a challenge to Albuquerque, who thought the mainstream superhero book was not well-suited to his darker style, and approached the book by employing less heavy blacks and ink splats, and a more "cartoony" storytelling style. His other DC work has included covers of several titles, as well as interior work on issues #52 and #53 of Superman/Batman. and the Robin/Spoiler Special #1 in 2008. That same year, Albuquerque illustrated writer Ivan Brandon's story, "Wild Goose", which appeared in the Dark Horse Comics anthology Tales of the Fear Agent. In 2009 he drew issues #3 and #4 of Strange Adventures and drew the covers to Marvel Comics' four-issue miniseries Nomad: Girl Without a World.

In January 2010, Newsarama named Albuquerque one of ten creators to watch for the coming year. Albuquerque, with Eduardo Medeiros and Mateus Santolouco, wrote Mondo Urbano, a graphic novel published by Oni Press. That same year Albuquerque began illustrating American Vampire, a horror series published by DC Comics' Vertigo imprint, the first five issues of which consisted of two separate stories, one by Scott Snyder and one by Stephen King, marking King's first original work for comics. Albuquerque illustrated the two stories with different styles, representative of both the personalities of the characters and the eras in which they were set, explaining that he utilized high-contrast blacks and whites for the 1920s story featuring Pearl in order to evoke the films of that era, and a "dirtier, sketchier technique" involving traditional inking, ink wash and pencils for the 1880s story featuring bank robber Skinner, in order to evoke that story's "rough and violent" setting. The first hardcover collection appeared on The New York Times Best Seller list, and the series won IGN's Best of 2010 Award, 2011 Eisner Award and the 2011 Harvey Award, all of them for Best New Series.

In 2012 Albuquerque illustrated and wrote his first story for DC Comics, which appeared in Legends of the Dark Knight. He drew backup stories for Batman vol. 2 #21–23 (August–October 2013) as part of the "Batman: Zero Year" storyline.

Albuquerque publishes a creator-owned webcomic in Brazil titled Tune 8, which follows a time traveler named Joshua who has only a disembodied female voice as to guide him through the foreign and inhospitable place in which he finds himself. Tune 8 was serialized on the Brazilian website IG.com.br, and later became the 5-part mini series Eight, published by Dark Horse Comics. In 2013, he co-scripted with frequent collaborator Scott Snyder the 64-page American Vampire one-shot The Long Road to Hell.

In 2025, Albuquerque and writer Dan Slott launched the Superman Unlimited series.

== Personal life ==
Albuquerque lives in Porto Alegre, Brazil.

== Awards and nominations ==
=== Won ===
- 2010 IGN Award for Best New Series (for American Vampire, with Scott Snyder and Stephen King)
- 2011 Eisner Award for Best New Series (for American Vampire, with Scott Snyder and Stephen King)
- 2011 Harvey Award for Best New Series (for American Vampire, with Scott Snyder and Stephen King)
- 2018 Inkpot Award

=== Nominations ===
- 2009 Wizard Fan Award for Favorite Breakout Artist (for Blue Beetle)
- 2010 Broken Frontier Award for Best Debut Book (for American Vampire, with Scott Snyder and Stephen King)
- 2011 Scream Award for Best Comic Book or Graphic Novel (for American Vampire, with Scott Snyder and Stephen King)
- 2011 Eagle Awards
  - Award for Favourite Newcomer Artist
  - Award for Favourite New Comicbook (for American Vampire, with Scott Snyder and Stephen King)
- 2012 Eagle Award for Favourite Continued Story (for American Vampire: "Ghost War", with Scott Snyder) 2012 HQ Mix Awards for
  - Award for National Artist (for Tune 8 and American Vampire)
  - Award for International Highlight
  - Award for Independent Publishing Author (for Tune 8)
  - Award for Web Comic (for Tune 8)
- 2016 Eisner Award for Best Cover Artist (for Huck and Eight)
- 2017 Eisner Award for Best Publication for Teens (Batgirl: Beyond Burnside, with Hope Larson)

== Bibliography ==
=== DC Comics ===
- Action Comics #1000 (2018)
- All Star Batman #10–14 (2017)
- Animal Man vol. 2 #24–25, 27–28 (2013–2014)
- Batgirl vol. 5 #1–6 (2016)
- Batman vol. 2 #8–11, 21–23 (2012–2013)
- Batman vol. 3 #50 (2018)
- Batman Black and White vol. 2 #2 (2013)
- Detective Comics #934–967, 969–981 (variant covers only) (2016–2018)
- Blue Beetle vol. 7 #10–14, 16–18, 20, 22–25, 29–30, 33–34 (2007–2009)
- DCU Holiday Special #1 (2009)
- Green Lantern vol. 4 #40 (2009)
- Legends of the Dark Knight vol. 2 #12 (2013)
- Robin/Spoiler Special #1 (2008)
- Strange Adventures vol. 3 #3–4 (2009)
- Superman/Batman #51–52, 62–63, 75 (2008–2010)

==== Vertigo ====
- American Vampire #1–9, 13–18, 22–25, 28–34 (2010–2013)
- American Vampire Anthology #1 (2013)
- American Vampire: Second Cycle #1–4, 6–11 (2014–2015)
- American Vampire: The Long Road to Hell #1 (2013)

=== Image Comics ===
- Huck #1–6 (2015–2016)
- Kingsman: The Red Diamond #2 (2017; cover-only)
- Hit-Girl #9–12 (2018–2019)
- Prodigy #1–6 (2018–2019)

=== Marvel Comics ===
- Uncanny X-Force #5.1 (2011)
- Wolverine #309 (2012)

=== Oni Press ===
- Mondo Urbano (2010)

=== Stout Club ===
- Eight: Forasteiro (2015)

=== Dark Horse ===
- A Study in Emerald (2018)
