= Dave McCaig =

Canadian artist and colourist (born 1971)

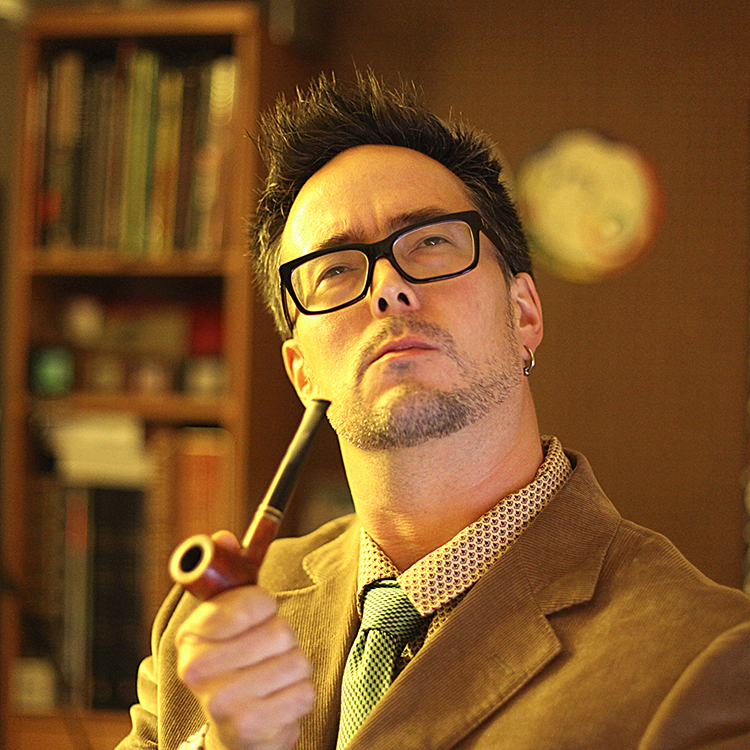
- Born: Dave McCaig; December 6, 1971 (age 54) Thunder Bay, Ontario
- Areas: Cartoonist, Colourist

Signature
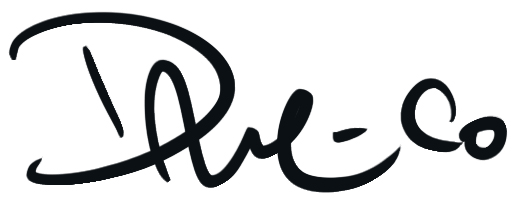

Dave McCaig (born December 6, 1971, in Thunder Bay, Ontario) is a Canadian artist and colourist who also works in the animation industry.

He has worked on comics including Adam Strange, X-Men, Star Wars, Superman: Birthright, The Matrix Comics, Nextwave, New Avengers, Northlanders, American Vampire, and Nemesis. Animation projects have included key colour design on the first three seasons of The Batman (2004) animated series at Warner Bros. and various duties on the fourth Teenage Mutant Ninja Turtles film.

He won the 2008 Joe Shuster Award for Best Colorist, which was awarded for the first time that year. McCaig also runs a forum for comic book colorists and artists called Gutterzombie.com.
